= MasterChef Australia series 10 =

MasterChef Australia
- Season 10
- Judges: Matt Preston; George Calombaris; Gary Mehigan
- No. of contestants: 24
- Winner: Sashi Cheliah
- Runner-up: Ben Borsht
- No. of episodes: 61

Release
- Original network: Network Ten
- Original release: 7 May – 31 July 2018

Series chronology
- ← Previous; Series 9 Next → Series 11

The tenth series of the Australian cooking game show MasterChef Australia premiered on 7 May 2018 on Network Ten. Judges Gary Mehigan, George Calombaris and Matt Preston returned from the previous series, with Shannon Bennett as the contestants' mentor.

This series was won by Sashi Cheliah in the grand finale against Ben Borsht, on 31 July 2018.

== Changes ==
This season introduced a change in the Mystery Box Challenge. The winner will be going straight into the Immunity Challenge, which means they will not be cooking in the invention test and will be safe from the Pressure Test on the following day.

Week 10 featured the remaining contestants competing for a special "10-Year Superpower" apron, which works similar to an immunity pin and a Power Apron but allows the bearer to withdraw during any stage of any individual challenge up to tasting.

== Contestants ==
=== Top 24 ===
The Top 24 were announced on 7–8 May 2018. Contestant Jo Kendray was a returning auditionee after two previous attempts to make it into the Top 24

Contestant	Age	State	Occupation	Status
Sashi Cheliah	39	SA	Prison officer	Winner 31 July
Ben Borsht	31	QLD	Builder	Runner-up 31 July
Khanh Ong	25	VIC	DJ	Eliminated 30 July
Jess Liemantara	19	VIC	Waitress	Eliminated 29 July
Chloe Carroll	28	QLD	Nutritionist	Eliminated 23 July
Reece Hignell	28	NSW	Recruitment consultant	Eliminated 19 July
Samira Damirova	36	WA	Stay-at-home mum	Eliminated 16 July
Kristen Sheffield	28	SA	Urban planner	Eliminated 12 July
Brendan Pang	24	WA	Social worker	Eliminated 5 July; Returned 21 June; Eliminated 7 June
Sarah Clare	33	NSW	Bar manager	Eliminated 2 July
Hoda Kobeissi	32	NSW	Social worker	Eliminated 28 June
Gina Ottaway	54	NSW	Ex disability support	Eliminated 25 June
Aldo Ortado	31	NSW	Restaurant manager	Eliminated 21 June
Lisa Diep	33	NSW	Senior IT analyst	Eliminated 18 June
Jenny Lam	28	WA	Entrepreneur	Eliminated 14 June
Genene Dwyer	49	VIC	Recruitment coordinator	Eliminated 11 June
Jo Kendray	46	VIC	Travel manager	Eliminated 4 June
Loki Madireddi	34	VIC	Stay-at-home dad	Eliminated 31 May
Michelle Walsh	47	NSW	Writer	Eliminated 28 May
Tim Talam	28	NSW	Butcher's assistant	Eliminated 24 May
Adele Elliott	34	NSW	Enrolment officer	Eliminated 21 May
Denise Valdez	37	VIC	Stay-at-home mum	Eliminated 17 May
Metter Chin	54	NSW	Project manager	Eliminated 14 May
Brett McGrath	32	QLD	Coffee roaster	Eliminated 10 May

Future appearances

- Khanh Ong, Jess Liemantara, Reece Hignell, Brendan Pang and Sarah Clare appeared on Series 12. Sarah was eliminated on May 19, 2020, finishing 14th. Jess was eliminated on May 31, 2020, finishing 12th. Khanh was eliminated on June 14, 2020, finishing 9th. Brendan was eliminated on June 21, 2020, finishing 8th and Reece was eliminated on July 12, 2020, finishing 5th.
- In Series 14 Aldo Ortado appeared for another chance to win the title, along with Sashi Cheliah who is competing to win the title for the second time. Sashi was eliminated on May 15, 2022, finishing 19th and Aldo was eliminated on June 26, 2022, finishing 8th.
- In Series 15 Sashi appeared as a guest team captain for a service challenge.
- Jess competed on the Dessert Masters spin off series. She finished 3rd on November 28, 2023.
- In Series 16 Sashi, Khanh, Jess, Reece & Aldo along with Genene Dwyer appeared as guests for the 1st service challenge.
- Reece competed in the second series of Dessert Masters. He finished 5th on November 18, 2024.

== Guest chefs ==
Week	Guest chef	Challenge
1	Julie Goodwin, Adam Liaw, Kate Bracks, Andy Allen, Emma Dean, Brent Owens, Billie McKay, Elena Duggan, Diana Chan	Auditions Part 1
2	Maggie Beer	Pressure Test
2	Shui Ishizaka	Immunity Challenge
2	Nathan Jones	Team Challenge
3 (Nigella Week)	Nigella Lawson	All Challenges & MasterClass
3 (Nigella Week)	Alanna Sapwell	Immunity Challenge
4 (Gordon Ramsay Week)	Gordon Ramsay	All Challenge excluding Elimination Challenge
4 (Gordon Ramsay Week)	Jo Barrett, Gavin Hughes, John Rivera	Immunity Challenge
4 (Gordon Ramsay Week)	Matt Abé	Elimination Challenge
5	Darren Purchese	Pressure Test
5	Jacqui Challinor	Immunity Challenge
5	Robin Wickens, Dave Sutherland	Team Challenge
5	Curtis Stone	Elimination Challenge
6 (South Australia Week)	Brendan Wessels	Pressure Test
6 (South Australia Week)	Jin Choi	Immunity Challenge
6 (South Australia Week)	Maggie Beer	Elimination Challenge
6 (South Australia Week)	Poh Ling Yeow, Callum Hann	MasterClass
7	Alla Wolf-Tasker	Pressure Test
7	Andy Harmer	Immunity Challenge
7	Lennox Hastie	Team Challenge
8 (Sweet Week)	Adriano Zumbo	Mystery Box Challenge & Invention Test
8 (Sweet Week)	Katherine Sabbath	Pressure Test
8 (Sweet Week)	Alice Wright	Immunity Challenge
8 (Sweet Week)	Adam D’Sylva	Team Challenge
8 (Sweet Week)	Kirsten Tibballs	Elimination Challenge
9 (Royal Week)	Saransh Goila	Pressure Test
9 (Royal Week)	Ashley Davis	Immunity Challenge
10 (Superpower Week)	Peter Gilmore	Elimination Challenge & MasterClass
11	Joe Grbac	Pressure Test
11	Reynold Poernomo, Matt Sinclair	Immunity Challenge
11	Curtis Stone	MasterClass
12	Ashley Palmer-Watts	Pressure Test
12	Monty Koludrovic	Service Challenge
12	Danielle Alvarez, Lennox Hastie, Ross Lusted, Jock Zonfrillo	Elimination Challenge
Finals	Heston Blumenthal	Grand Finale

== Elimination chart ==
No.	Week	1		2		3		4		5		6		7		8		9		10	11		Finals			
No.	Mystery Box Challenge Winner	Not conducted		Sashi		Kristen		Sashi		Sarah		Khanh		Gina		Ben; Reece		Khanh		None	Sashi		Ben		None	
No.	Invention Test Winner	Not conducted		Chloe; Kristen; Tim		Ben; Hoda; Loki		Reece; Samira		Aldo; Jess; Samira; Sashi		Jenny; Reece; Samira; Sashi		Khanh; Reece; Sashi		Chloe; Kristen		Brendan; Kristen; Samira		None	Khanh		Khanh		None	
No.	Immunity Challenge	Not conducted		Lose: Chloe		Win: Loki		Lose: Samira; Win: Reece, Sashi		Lose: Jess		Win: Khanh		Win: Sashi		Draw: Kristen		Lose: Khanh		None	Lose: Khanh		None		None	
1	Sashi	Top 24	IN	WIN	Team Win	IN	Team Lose	WIN	Team Win	Top 4	Team Win	Top 4	Team Win	Top 3	Team Win	Btm 4/Imm.	Team Win	IN	Team Lose 1/Imm.	Btm 3	WIN	ADV	Btm 2	Btm 2	Btm 2	WINNER
2	Ben	Top 24	IN	IN	Team Win	Top 3	Team Win	Btm 3	Team Lose	IN	Team Lose	Btm 4	Team Lose	IN	Btm 2	WIN	Btm 2	IN	Team Lose 2	Btm 7	Btm 3	Btm 3	WIN	Btm 3	WIN	Runner-up
3	Khanh	Top 24	IN	IN	Team Win	IN	Btm 2	IN	Team Win	IN	Team Lose	WIN	Team Lose/Imm.	Top 3	Team Win	IN	Team Lose	WIN	Team Win	Btm 7	WIN	Btm 5	WIN	ADV	3rd	Eliminated (Ep 60)
4	Jess	Top 24	Btm 3	IN	Team Win	IN	Team Win	IN	Team Win	Top 4	Btm 4	IN	Btm 3	IN	Team Lose	Btm 4	Team Win	Btm 3	Btm 2	Btm 7	Btm 3	Btm 2	Btm 3	Elim	Eliminated (Ep 59)	
5	Chloe	Top 24	Top 4	Top 3	Team Win	Btm 3	Team Win	Btm 3	Btm 3	IN	Btm 4	Btm 4	Team Win	IN	Team Lose	Top 2	Team Lose	Btm 3	Team Win	10.A.	Imm.	Btm 5	Elim	Eliminated (Ep 56)		
6	Reece	Top 24	IN	IN	Team Lose	Top 5	Team Lose	Top 2	Team Win	IN	Team Win	Top 4	Team Win	Top 3	Team Win	WIN	Team Win	IN	Team Win	Btm 7/Imm.	Top 2	Elim	Eliminated (Ep 54)			
7	Samira	Top 24	IN	Btm 3	Team Win	IN	Btm 5	Top 2	Team Lose	Top 4	Team Win	Top 4	Team Win	IN	Team Win	IN	Team Lose	Top 3	Team Lose 1	Btm 3	Elim	Eliminated (Ep 51)				
8	Kristen	Top 24	IN	Top 3	Team Win	WIN	Team Lose	IN	Team Lose	IN	Team Win	IN	Team Win	IN	Team Win	Top 2	Team Win	Top 3	Team Lose 2	Elim	Eliminated (Ep 49)					
9	Brendan	Top 24	IN	IN	Team Lose	IN	Team Win	IN	Team Win	Btm 4	Elim	Eliminated (Ep 24)				IN	Team Lose	Top 3	Elim	Re-eliminated (Ep 44)						
10	Sarah	Top 24	IN	IN	Team Win	IN	Team Lose	IN	Btm 3	WIN	Btm 4	IN	Team Win	Btm 3	Team Lose	Btm 4	Team Win	Elim	Eliminated (Ep 41)							
11	Hoda	Top 24	IN	IN	Team Win	Top 3	Btm 5	IN	Team Win	IN	Team Win	Btm 4	Btm 3	Btm 3	Team Win	IN	Elim	Eliminated (Ep 39)								
12	Gina	Top 24	Top 4	IN	Team Lose	IN	Team Win	IN	Team Lose	IN	Team Win	IN	Team Win	WIN	Team Lose	Elim	Eliminated (Ep 36)									
13	Aldo	Top 24	Top 4	IN	Team Lose	IN	Team Win	IN	Team Lose	Top 4	Team Lose	IN	Btm 4	IN	Elim	Eliminated (Ep 34)										
14	Lisa	Top 24	IN	IN	Team Lose	Top 5	Team Lose	IN	Team Win	Btm 4	Team Win	IN	Team Lose	Elim	Eliminated (Ep 31)											
15	Jenny	Top 24	IN	IN	Btm 3	Btm 3	Team Win	IN	Team Win	Btm 4	Team Lose	Top 4	Elim	Eliminated (Ep 29)												
16	Genene	Top 24	Btm 3	IN	Team Lose	IN	Btm 5	IN	Team Win	IN	Team Win	Elim	Eliminated (Ep 26)													
17	Jo	Top 24	IN	IN	Team Lose	IN	Team Win	IN	Team Lose	Elim	Eliminated (Ep 21)															
18	Loki	Top 24	Top 4	IN	Team Win	Top 3	Team Win	IN	Elim	Eliminated (Ep 19)																
19	Michelle	Top 24	IN	Btm 3	Team Win	IN	Team Win	Elim	Eliminated (Ep 16)																	
20	Tim	Top 24	IN	Top 3	Team Lose	IN	Elim	Eliminated (Ep 14)																		
21	Adele	Top 24	IN	IN	Btm 3	Elim	Eliminated (Ep 11)																			
22	Denise	Top 24	IN	IN	Elim	Eliminated (Ep 9)																				
23	Metter	Top 24	IN	Elim	Eliminated (Ep 6)																					
24	Brett	Top 24	Elim	Eliminated (Ep 4)																						
	Eliminated		Brett	Metter	Denise	Adele	Tim	Michelle	Loki	Jo	Brendan; 1st Elimination	Genene	Jenny	Lisa	Aldo	Gina	Hoda	Sarah	Brendan; Re-elimination	Kristen	Samira	Reece	Chloe	Jess	Khanh	Ben; 77 points
	Eliminated		Brett	Metter	Denise	Adele	Tim	Michelle	Loki	Jo	Brendan; 1st Elimination	Genene	Jenny	Lisa	Aldo	Gina	Hoda	Sarah	Brendan; Re-elimination	Kristen	Samira	Reece	Chloe	Jess	Khanh	Sashi; 93 points (win)

== Episodes and ratings ==
Colour key:
– Highest rating during the series
– Lowest rating during the series

Ep#/ Wk-Ep#	Original airdate	Episode title/event	Total viewers (five metro cities)	Nightly ranking
Week 1
1/01-1	Monday, 7 May 2018	Series Premiere: Auditions Part 1 – The nine former winners of previous seasons appeared to encourage the candidates who will be cooking their signature dish in one hour for entry to the Top 24. Eighteen home cooks secured their places in the Top 24 after receiving three votes from the judges while nine contestants who received one or two "yes" votes were given the opportunity to cook again in a second audition.	890,000	#7
2/01-2	Tuesday, 8 May 2018	Auditions Part 2 – To win their places in the Top 24, the hopefuls under mentor Shannon Bennett were given 75 minutes to cook a dish that highlighted their choice of one of the ingredients: coconut, chilli, bacon, orange or peanuts, The judges tasted each plate without knowing the cook to determine the next five aprons awarded. Tim, Ben, Lisa, Jenny and Jess triumphed with their dishes and made it into the Top 24 while two out of the four contestants were eliminated due to technical flaws in their dishes. The second round challenged the two remaining contestants, Michelle and Bunny to cook another dish in one hour with ingredients from the pantry. It was Michelle who succeeded with her chocolate lava cake and she won the last spot in the Top 24.	845,000	#5
3/01-3	Wednesday, 9 May 2018	Hospitality Cooking Challenge – On their first day in the competition, the Top 24 had 90 minutes and an open pantry to cook their dishes and impress the judges, focusing on hospitality. The four standout dishes belonged to Aldo, Loki, Chloe and Gina. Genene, Brett and Jess were sent to elimination after producing the least impressive dishes.	910,000	#5
4/01-4	Thursday, 10 May 2018	Home Fridge Elimination Challenge – Brett, Genene and Jess were given 75 minutes to cook a dish with ingredients from their home fridge and pantry. Jess was successful with her white chocolate mousse and raspberry jelly which impressed in the judging. While Genene's quantity of her chicken dumplings are small, they were delicious in the tasting. Brett's salmon dish with carrot purée was praised but not the chickpeas, which were overcooked. Between him and Genene to face the results, the judges chose the latter's dumplings and she was safe as Brett became the first 2018 contestant eliminated from the competition.	835,000	#5
Week 2
5/02-1	Sunday, 13 May 2018	Eclectic Box Challenge & Precipitation Invention Test – In their first Mystery Box Challenge, the contestants were informed that the new advantage was for an appointed contestant to choose eight ingredients, with at least one to be used to cook a dish in 75 minutes. The winning dish will grant direct access to the Immunity Challenge. The ingredients selected by Sashi were parsnip, oranges, cinnamon, chicken, mixed peppercorns, sage, celery and onions. Sashi was also one of the top five contestants' dishes to be tasted by the judges along with Gina, Brendan, Denise and Genene. It was Sashi who won with his roasted chicken dish. The remaining contestants were given 75 minutes to prepare dishes centering on precipitation in the Invention Test, with the top three joining Sashi in the Immunity Challenge. Chloe, Kristen and Tim stood out as the top three and advanced to compete for immunity. Samira, Sarah, Metter and Michelle faltered throughout the challenge with the bottom three dishes sending their cooks (Samira, Metter and Michelle) to the Pressure Test.	723,000	#6
6/02-2	Monday, 14 May 2018	Pressure Test: Maggie Beer's Apple and Rosemary Tarte Tatin – Maggie Beer challenged Metter, Michelle and Samira to recreate her tarte tatin—the first Pressure Test dish from the first series—accompanied by a custard and ice cream in two-and-a-half hours. Samira impressed with her approach to Maggie's dish, winning praise overall. It was between Metter and Michelle for elimination, and while the latter's caramel was too dark and bitter, Metter's raw apples and underbaked dense pastry ensured he became the second contestant to be eliminated.	820,000	#7
7/02-3	Tuesday, 15 May 2018	Immunity Challenge: Shui Ishizaka – In round one, Chloe, Kristen, Sashi and Tim had to make a simple dish using eggs and their choice of pantry items. Kristen's Raspberry Mousse with Lemon Curd and Chloe's Soba Noodles with a Soft-Boiled Egg were the two standout dishes, with Chloe winning the challenge by split decision. To compete against Shui Ishizaka, the current Young Chef of 2018, Chloe had the advantage of selecting her choice of ten ingredients to cook in 75 minutes. Ishizaka had 60 minutes to cook with the same ingredients. Chloe's tortellini scored 24 points but lost to the professional's 26 points for his prawn dish with custard and milk skin.	804,000	#6
8/02-4	Wednesday, 16 May 2018	Melbourne Cricket Ground Team Challenge – Teams cooked in the Melbourne Cricket Ground to serve nutritious three-course meals (two canapé appetizers, a main course and a dessert) to the Melbourne Football Club and their partners, including the judges, as well as guest judge and footballer Nathan Jones in their first off-site challenge. Each team was assigned with their respective core protein: meat (Red) and seafood (Blue). The miscommunication in Sashi's Blue Team struggled for suggestions and their demand for the dishes (particularly the salmon main) than Tim's Red team but the latter stumbled with one of their meat appetizer dishes forcing them to improvise it in the three-hour prep time. After service, both teams won praise with their main dishes but had technical flaws in one of their canapés. However, the deciding factor was the inadequate presentation and imbalance of the Red team's dessert after the Blue team excelled the challenge.	762,000	#7
9/02-5	Thursday, 17 May 2018	First Food Memory Elimination Challenge – Losing team members from the team challenge had to cook dishes that influenced their first passion for food. After Aldo, Brendan and Reece produced the best dishes, Adele's corn fritters were too dense and lacked spice while Jenny's matcha sponge cake was heavy and underbaked, but Denise pushed herself in making her pig's trotter salad in the 75-minute challenge as the protein was cooked inconsistently, and led to her elimination.	792,000	#5
Week 3 – Nigella Week
10/03-1	Sunday, 20 May 2018	Nigella's Mystery Box Challenge & Food Physics Invention Test – Nigella Lawson returned as the guest judge for the week with her choice of Mystery Box ingredients: marsala, chicken livers, squid, condensed milk, ginger, chilli, cherries, passion fruit, anchovies and thyme. The winning dish after 75 minutes earned entry to the Immunity Challenge and also an afternoon tea with Nigella in London. Out of the dishes of Genene, Gina, Jess and Reece, it was Kristen who won the challenge. The remaining contestants were given 75 minutes in the Invention Test to cook a dish focusing on the sounds of "snap, crackle and pop". Ben, Loki and Hoda succeeded in meeting the brief and were named the Top 3, mentions went to the dishes of Lisa and Reece. Adele and Jenny, who were in the bottom three last week, were once again sent to elimination along with Chloe.	811,000	#4
11/03-2	Monday, 21 May 2018	Pressure Test: Nigella's Chocolate Feast – Adele, Chloe and Jenny were given 75 minutes to recreate four of Nigella's chocolate desserts: a white chocolate cookie dough pot, a milk chocolate brownie, a dark chocolate olive oil mousse and a ruby chocolate cheesecake. Chloe nailed the challenge with her dishes as it came down to Jenny and Adele. Jenny's mousse was too runny after struggling with her egg whites and Adele's cheesecake was rushed on the assembling while both of their cookies were underbaked. But Adele forgot the white chocolate chips in the dough batter which failed to attain the objective of Nigella's Pressure Test and that was enough to eliminate her.	805,000	#6
12/03-3	Tuesday, 22 May 2018	Immunity Challenge: Alanna Sapwell – Ben, Hoda, Kristen and Loki competed in the first round, cooking pancakes in 45 minutes. Hoda and Loki both impressed with their dishes but it was Loki who won the challenge with his savoury take on the dish (dosa with two chutneys) to cook off against Alanna Sapwell, head chef of Saint Peter restaurant, in the second round. He chose one of the two citrus fruits (lemons over oranges) as the core ingredient. During her 60 minutes, Alanna cooked Squid with Ink Sauce and Lemon Dressing. Loki won praise for his Kingfish with Shellfish Lemon Broth and scored 37 points over Alanna's 34, winning him the immunity pin.	877,000	#5
13/03-4	Wednesday, 23 May 2018	Brunch Cafe Service Challenge – The contestants, led by Aldo from the Red team and Kristen from the Blue team, took charge for service in two adjacent cafes (Kitty Burns and Frankie Says) in Abbotsford, Victoria and served their menu of four brunch meals prepared in two-and-a-half-hours for 75 customers each. During prep time, Brendan of the Red team was injured when his hand was cut on a broken bottle of olive oil; the other team members took charge. All of their dishes stood out during the tasting and, despite Red team losing a team member, it was the undercooked semolina crumb from the Blue team's dessert that took them to elimination.	813,000	#5
14/03-5	Thursday, 24 May 2018	Trifle Tasting Elimination Challenge – The ten losing contestants have three minutes to taste and identify all the ingredients of Nigella's trifle in the first round. Lisa (with 18 correct guesses), Kristen (17), Reece (13), Sashi and Sarah (12 each) were announced safe leaving the others to face the second round of elimination where they had to create their dishes with all 26 ingredients from the trifle in 75 minutes. In the judging, Khanh's dessert had technical flaws on the rest of his elements despite winning praise with his pistachio ice cream. Hoda and Samira delivered standout dishes while Genene also impressed with her dish. It was between Tim and Khanh. Tim took a risk prepping a bombe Alaska in the cook. But overall, the dish was too sweet and the layers lacked precision as it collapsed after his parfait thawed completely when he presented it to the judges and, as a result, Tim left the competition.	781,000	#5
14/03-5	Thursday, 24 May 2018	MasterClass: Nigella Lawson, Matt Preston and Gary Mehigan – The top 19 arrive at the Jacalope Hotel in Victoria for their first MasterClass with Nigella and the judges who will present their recipes (Nigella's Middle Eastern beef & aubergine fatteh, Matt's cauliflower with tarator, Gary's samosas with coriander chutney and Nigella's ginger and walnut carrot cake).	558,000	#9
Week 4 – Gordon Ramsay Week
15/04-1	Sunday, 27 May 2018	Gordon's British Box Challenge & Fast Food Invention Test – Gordon Ramsay, the celebrity chef, was introduced as the show's guest judge for the first time. He challenged the contestants to cook dishes in 75 minutes with his chosen British ingredients from the Mystery Box: scallops, lamb, peas, cauliflower, beer, mustard, English tea and biscuits. Brendan, Gina, Reece, Sarah and Sashi chose lamb and cooked the top five dishes, and the latter won the challenge for the second time to compete for immunity. The Invention Test tasked the contestants to cook a burger meal in 75 minutes with only the top two contestants joining Sashi in the immunity challenge. It was Reece and Samira who stood out in the challenge. Ben, on the other hand, joined Chloe and Michelle, who had previously been in a Pressure Test, for elimination.	903,000	#3
16/04-2	Monday, 28 May 2018	Pressure Test: Raviolo of Marron – Ben, Chloe and Michelle had to follow Gordon to recreate his dish of marron raviolo with shellfish bisque and lemon vinaigrette before plating the dish ten seconds after Gordon. Ben, despite missing out the garnishes, and Chloe, despite lacking depth of flavour in her sauce, both excelled in the judging. Michelle faltered in the challenge and served her dish with an inedible unshelled marron claw and an undercooked raviolo filling, eliminating her.	895,000	#5
17/04-3	Tuesday, 29 May 2018	Immunity Challenge: Jo Barrett, Gavin Hughes, John Rivera – Reece, Samira and Sashi competed as a team against three guest chefs to win an immunity pin each with mentorship from Gordon. Reece was pitted against John Rivera, Samira faced pastry chef Jo Barrett and Sashi cooked against Gavin Hughes. From the majority votes of Samira and Sashi, they chose the vegetables over fruits to cook their dishes in 75 minutes. Samira made a Pumpkin Pilaf with Quail and Saffron Jus which scored 24 points but lost to the creativity of Jo who scored 29 points with her dessert of potato, rosemary and ginger. Sashi scored 20 points for his deconstructed duck curry paired with his choice of vegetables while Gavin's roast beef with red wine sauce didn't meet the brief to highlight the vegetables as he scored 18 points. Reece produced an innovative dessert with vegetables (Cucumber Sorbet with Yoghurt Mousse) and earned 25 points while John prepped a seafood dashi with tomatoes, however, the broth was overpowering, using too much bonito flakes and the dish scored 21 points. For their respective wins, Reece and Sashi succeeded in the challenge to win an immunity pin each.	881,000	#6
18/04-4	Wednesday, 30 May 2018	Three-Course Dinner Service Challenge – Gordon drafted the contestants into two teams and mentored them for the service challenge, where they had to cook a three-course dinner for fifty diners in four hours. In prep time, the communication in Chloe's Blue team faltered in the cooking and produced technical flaws in the first taste dishes critiqued by Gordon. The prawn filling for the entrée was overcooked, the salmon was raw for the main and the panna cotta for the dessert was not set. During service time, Brendan's Red team trimmed off the pork fat to improve the main dish while the Blue team changed the entrée to make up time but their main salmon dish was cooked inconsistently in the judging. The results came down to the errors of the main dishes from both teams but the flawed communication and salmon dish sent the Blue team to elimination.	863,000	#6
19/04-5	Thursday, 31 May 2018	Pressure Test: Matt Abé's Roast Chicken with Summer Vegetables and Green Herb Consommé – The contestants had to recreate a three-Michelin star chicken dish from Restaurant Gordon Ramsay by chef Matt Abé in the two-and a-half hour Pressure Test. Jo delivered her best interpretation of the dish over Ben's while the bottom three faced the judges' decision: Sarah's chicken was overdone and her other elements were inconsistent. Chloe's lacked mousse while her consommé was flat. However, despite his good run throughout the competition, Loki, who had the immunity pin last week, put his position at risk by participating the challenge. He fell under the pressure and his chicken was overcooked while the mousse was grainy, the consommé lacked flavour and the vegetables were untidy which resulted in his elimination, making him the first contestant to leave the competition with possession of the pin without ever using it.	845,000	#5
Week 5
20/05-1	Sunday, 3 June 2018	"20" Box Challenge & Team Relay Invention Test – The Mystery Box challenge required the contestants to shop in 20 minutes with $20 for their choice of ingredients, and cook a dish in 75 minutes. Sarah was named the winner of the first round for the opportunity to compete in the Immunity Challenge. Samira, Genene, Kristen and Lisa, who had the remaining top five dishes, were assigned to start in the first leg of a team relay Invention Test and to highlight honey in their dishes. The Blue team produced the only impressive dish and joined Sarah in vying for the Immunity Challenge. The Yellow team improvised their dish in the first two changeovers but at the last leg, their chocolate ganache was unnecessary on the plate. The Red team struggled throughout and had overall flaws in their dish, but it was the disjointed teamwork from the Green team (Lisa, Jenny, Jo and Brendan) as they presented the least impressive dish, sending them straight to elimination.	781,000	#6
21/05-2	Monday, 4 June 2018	Pressure Test: Darren Purchese's Peach Melba – Brendan, Jenny, Jo and Lisa were given three hours to recreate Darren Purchese's first dish, peach Melba, with a tempered white chocolate collar and a raspberry tuile encased in a sugar cage. Brendan astonished with his version of Darren's dish while Jenny's take also impressed the judges. Both of them were declared safe. Neither Lisa nor Jo plated the chocolate in their dishes but Jo overpoached her peaches and her tuile was too thick which eliminated her from the competition.	850,000	#6
22/05-3	Tuesday, 5 June 2018	Immunity Challenge: Jacqui Challinor – Aldo, Jess, Samira, Sarah and Sashi had 45 minutes to cook their chicken wings with a side dish in the first round. The two best dishes belonged to Sarah and Jess, and it was the latter's first savoury dish that won her the chance to compete against Jacqui Challinor from Nomad restaurant. Jess chose the big ingredients (including eggs) to cook her lime tart in 75 minutes while Jacqui prepped barbecue prawns in 60 minutes. The judges gave praise for the tart but it was too sweet from the overuse of meringue and Jess scored 25 points against Jacqui's score of 28 for her prawn dish.	852,000	#6
23/05-4	Wednesday, 6 June 2018	Two-Course Team Challenge from Memory – The sixteen contestants were divided into two teams to replicate a main course and a dessert from the restaurant Wickens at the Royal Mail Hotel in Dunkeld. The Red team, led by captain Lisa and vice-captain Reece, and the Blue team, led by Sarah and Jess, memorize the recipes of the dishes from executive chef Robin Wickens and head chef Dave Sutherland. They had to communicate to their teammates with instructions on replicating the dishes in 120 minutes. The decision was close and, while the balance of the Red team's main course was flat, their dessert was lauded by the guest chefs. The Blue team was praised with their main dish but their dessert's core element (the ice cream) was too soft and lacked cherry pit flavour, which sent them to elimination.	733,000	#8
24/05-5	Thursday, 7 June 2018	Butchery Elimination Challenge – The elimination challenge saw the contestants in two rounds set by Curtis Stone and centered on butchering. In the first round, they took turns to identify cuts of meat to avoid landing one of four places in the second round of elimination. Brendan, Chloe, Jess and Sarah were given 75 minutes to butcher and choose one cut of their beef to make a dish. Sarah's beef with corn and salsa was praised while Chloe's noodle dish impressed the judges despite mincing her beef. It came down to Jess, whose flavours in her beef salad were unbalanced, and Brendan, who served up a dish with undercooked beef. It was Brendan who departed the competition.	838,000	#5
Week 6 – South Australia Week
25/06-1	Sunday, 10 June 2018	South Australia Farmers' Invention Test & Victoria Square Market Stall Service Challenge – The challenges this week took place in South Australia and in the first of the two challenges at Victoria Square, contestants were given 60 minutes to prep a dish with local produce from South Australian farms. Genene, Jess, Sashi, Sarah and Khanh had the top five dishes. After Khanh advanced to the immunity challenge, the remaining contestants were divided into pairs and ran market stalls to prep a $7.50 savoury dish and a $5 sweet dish for 500 customers in three hours before service over two hours. All teams raised a total of $7,280 for SecondBite food rescue charity. The popularity of the White team's (Reece and Sashi) chicken curry dish increased as they ran out of portions for the customers. Despite this, the team raised a total of $1,370 while the Blue team (Jenny and Samira) put up the best dishes. Both teams joined Khanh to compete for immunity. The Green team (Ben and Hoda) served overcooked kofta balls while their salad let the dish down and their milk custard dessert was underwhelming. The flavours in both of the Red team's (Chloe and Genene) dishes were bland. For these reasons, both teams were sent to the Pressure Test.	622,000	#6
26/06-2	Monday, 11 June 2018	Pressure Test: Brendan Wessels' Lemon Meringue Pie – Ben, Chloe, Genene and Hoda arrived at the d'Arenberg Cube restaurant in McLaren Vale to recreate a lemon meringue pie by restaurateur Brendan Wessels with the use of a 3D food printer in three hours. Ben cooked with precision to interpret the dish while, despite her fennel pearls being too soft, Chloe's plate also impressed. Genene and Hoda missed the attention to detail. Hoda's dish lacked texture after excluding the crisp pearls and the feulletine for the coconut rocher but Genene's chocolate was uncaramelized while she missed out the crisp pearls, the candied ginger and the fennel garnish; lacking the significant balance in the chef's dish that left her eliminated.	885,000	#5
27/06-3	Tuesday, 12 June 2018	Immunity Challenge: Jin Choi – Jenny, Khanh, Reece, Samira and Sashi arrived at one of the historic houses of Mount Lofty for the first round of the immunity challenge where they took turns choosing a random cloche and guessing the ingredient. Khanh succeeded in the challenge and cooked against South Australian chef Jin Choi from Hardy's Verandah Restaurant. Khanh took the advantage to beat the chef by picking Vegemite over peanut butter to cook his chicken and Vegemite dumplings. Jin produced a lackluster risotto dish that failed to feature the core ingredient and he had the lower score of 17 points as Khanh won an immunity pin with a score of 26.	886,000	#5
28/06-4	Wednesday, 13 June 2018	Jacob's Creek Team Challenge – Two teams arrive at Jacob's Creek vineyard in the Barossa Valley where they had to cook a three-course meal featuring local produce from the vineyard, and grapes as the core ingredient, for 60 diners. Both Khanh's Red team and Reece's Blue team produced standout entrée dishes but the pork fillet main dish (Blue) was overcooked and the blue cheese mousse (Red) was unbalanced. Highlights were Red team's eye fillet with vegetables for main and Blue team's vineyard-inspired dessert. Both teams delivered two standout dishes and by unanimous vote, the Blue team won the challenge.	860,000	#5
29/06-5	Thursday, 14 June 2018	Maggie Beer's Chicken Elimination Challenge – The contestants arrived at Maggie Beer's eatery at the Barossa Valley for their last challenge in South Australia. After Khanh escaped elimination by using his immunity pin, the others competed to impress the judges and Maggie by prepping dishes using one chicken over three rounds. Lisa and Ben were safe in the 45-minute first round while Aldo succeeded in the second within 30 minutes. This left Hoda, Jenny and Jess to face the last round with 20 minutes left. Hoda's final dish won praise but Jess undercooked her chicken coating. While Jenny's chicken impressed and her corn salad was flat, none of those elements overall are cohesive, sealing her elimination.	787,000	#7
29/06-5	Thursday, 14 June 2018	MasterClass: Callum Hann, Matt Preston, George Calombaris and Poh Ling Yeow – The contestants returned to Adelaide for their MasterClass with recipes from the judges and series runners-up Callum Hann (series 2) and Poh Ling Yeow (series 1), both of whom reside in South Australia. Callum barbecued an octopus paired with beetroot and cavolo nero, Matt baked two interpretations of mac 'n' cheese, George made a savoury take on his afternoon tea and Poh demonstrated her rhubarb and pistachio mille-feuille.	561,000	#10
Week 7
30/07-1	Sunday, 17 June 2018	Bread Box Challenge & Re-invention Test – Contestants were given 60 minutes to make a dish with one loaf of bread as the Mystery Box ingredient. Aldo, Gina and Ben delivered the Top 3 dishes with Gina advancing to the Immunity Challenge. A re-invention test required the remaining contestants to re-create a dish with the ingredients from spaghetti bolognaise. Reece, Sashi and Khanh succeeded while Hoda, Lisa and Sarah had the least appealing dishes and were sent to elimination.	813,000	#6
31/07-2	Monday, 18 June 2018	Pressure Test: Alla Wolf-Tasker's Autumn Harvest – In two hours and forty-five minutes, the bottom three contestants had to recreate Alla Wolf-Tasker's Autumn-inspired duck dish. During the verdicts, Hoda's carrots were raw and Sarah forgot to plate her chestnut purée after the cook. While Lisa's presentation of the dish was too large, her plate had too much chestnut and celeriac purées, leaving the dish unbalanced which sealed her exit from the competition.	833,000	#8
32/07-3	Tuesday, 19 June 2018	Immunity Challenge: Andy Harmer – Gina, Khanh, Reece and Sashi faced a three-round sudden death skills challenge: dice vegetables in brunoise cut, prep a hollandaise sauce and cook a salted caramel sauce. After Reece and Gina are eliminated in the first two rounds, Sashi beat Khanh for an opportunity to face executive chef Andy Harmer from Melbourne and win a second immunity pin. Sashi's advantage was to choose one ingredient from each of two different pantries. With 75 minutes to cook a dish of lamb and peas, Sashi's dish impressed while Andy's take was also praised after 60 minutes but his lamb was slightly undercooked and he scored 24 points. For the first time in the ten-year competition, Sashi won a second immunity pin with an overall score of 27 points.	863,000	#5
33/07-4	Wednesday, 20 June 2018	Dandenong Ranges Team Challenge – The contestants arrived at the Dandenong Ranges for the team challenge, set by the judges and guest chef Lennox Hastie, where they had to prep a three-course meal using open-fire cooking in two hours for 60 Victorian firefighters. Hoda's Blue team was assigned to cook dishes with seafood and Ben's Red team cooked a three-course meal of meat. After service, both teams were applauded with their entrées but both had serious issues with their chocolate desserts due to their inexperience of cooking on an open flame. The Red team struggled throughout more than the Blue team as their main steak dish had technical flaws in the other elements which sent them to elimination.	810,000	#5
34/07-5	Thursday, 21 June 2018	World Cuisine Elimination Challenge and Second Chance Cook-Off – Aldo, Ben, Chloe, Gina, Jess and Sarah each had 45 minutes to cook a prawn dish with their assigned cuisine: French, Greek, Mexican, Spanish, Thai and Vietnamese. Jess won overall praise from the judges for her dish and she was first to be announced safe while the dishes of Sarah, Gina and Chloe also stood out. Ben, who served a disjointed prawn dish with shells and underwhelming elements, and Aldo, who served inconsistently cooked prawns with bland flavours, were named the bottom two to determine the next contestant eliminated. The judges decided Aldo's dish was least impressive. To be reinstated in the Top 12, he competed against the twelve previously eliminated contestants who had to cook a dish in one hour. Lisa, Brendan and Michelle delivered standout dishes. Ultimately, it was Brendan's poached lobster with carrot dressing and bonito bavarois that impressed the judges and he earned his place back in the competition.	796,000	#6
Week 8 – Sweet Week
35/08-1	Sunday, 24 June 2018	Adriano Zumbo's Mystery Box Challenge & Croquembouche Invention Test – On the first day of challenges centering on desserts, the twelve contestants were tasked to cook their dishes in 30 minutes with ingredients from the Mystery Box chosen by Adriano Zumbo. Ben, Jess, Sashi, Sarah & Reece are tasted for the Top 5. Reece and Ben are applauded and advanced to contest for immunity. The second challenge divided the contestants into pairs where they were given a task of baking their take of a mini croquembouche in two hours. The Red pair of Kristen and Chloe delivered and joined the boys for immunity. The Green team (Gina and Jess) and the Purple team (Sarah and Sashi) had technical issues with flavour, sending them to the Pressure Test.	731,000	#7
36/08-2	Monday, 25 June 2018	Pressure Test: Katherine Sabbath's Birthday Cake – Cake artist Katherine Sabbath was welcomed as the guest judge to introduce one of her cake designs: a raspberry white vanilla layered cake with tempered white chocolate raspberry bark as the Pressure Test dish. After Sashi used one of his immunity pins, the others had 75 minutes to recreate her cake. Sarah won praise for the baking of the cake, however, her buttercream was eggy and her chocolate was too soft. Jess thrived with the presentation of her dish albeit rushed in the spreading of her buttercream while her chocolate was undertempered. Unlike her fellow competitors' cakes, Gina's was underbaked and the presentation did not match Katherine's which saw her eliminated.	889,000	#6
37/08-3	Tuesday, 26 June 2018	Immunity Challenge: Alice Wright – Ben, Chloe, Kristen and Reece took turns naming one of 36 flavours of gelato where a lone contestant would advance to compete in the second round of the Immunity Challenge. Kristen succeeded to compete against pastry chef Alice Wright and, from a neapolitan ice cream, chose chocolate (over strawberry and vanilla) to cook her dessert in 75 minutes. During the tasting, Alice had technical errors in her dish despite winning praise for the flavours but Kristen had technical issues in her mousse as it was overpowered with the other flavours. As both of their desserts were flawed, Kristen was not awarded a pin after the result ended in a tie on 18 points with the professional.	938,000	#5
38/08-4	Wednesday, 27 June 2018	Restaurant Takeover Team Challenge – Executive chef Adam D'Sylva was the contestants' mentor for a lunch service challenge at his two Melbourne restaurants, Coda (Vietnamese cuisine) and Tonka (Indian cuisine) where they had to prep and serve a four-course meal (two sweet main courses and two savoury desserts) in four hours. The Blue Team served 40 customers at Coda while the Red team served 48 customers at Tonka. During prep time, Brendan's Red Team had a shaky start in prepping their main course dishes while Sarah's Blue Team struggled with their kingfish dish when the grill was too hot. After service, both teams missed the brief in two of their dishes and it was the Red Team's undercooked cauliflower dish and flat dessert samosas which sent them to elimination.	847,000	#5
39/08-5	Thursday, 28 June 2018	Chocolate Wheel Elimination Challenge – Ben, Brendan, Chloe, Hoda, Khanh and Samira each had to spin an edible game wheel made out of chocolate by Kirsten Tibballs to determine their assigned ingredient (almond, banana, cinnamon, coconut, lemon or peppermint) to cook a dessert in 75 minutes. Brendan and Khanh, who both had cinnamon as their core ingredient, delivered the top two dishes while Samira (who had banana) and Chloe (with almond) also impressed. All four of them made it into the Top 10. Ben's jam for his lamington was too thick but it was Hoda's unnecessary use of cinnamon which overpowered her dense cake batter that sent her home.	786,000	#5
Week 9 – Royal Week
40/09-1	Sunday, 1 July 2018	Mystery Box Challenge & Royalty Cooking Challenge – For making it into the Top 10, the contestants each received $10,000 from Coles to develop their food career. In 60 minutes, the contestants had to use all of the ingredients from the Mystery Box (kalette, lemon, yoghurt, coriander seeds, extra virgin olive oil, gin and mint) to make a dish. Samira, Khanh and Kristen had the top dishes and Khanh won for the second time to compete for immunity. The others had to cook a dish fit for a king in 60 minutes. Samira and Kristen won out to compete for immunity along with Brendan as the Top 3 but Chloe, Sarah and Jess had technical flaws in flavour and were named as the Bottom 3.	718,000	#6
41/09-2	Monday, 2 July 2018	Pressure Test: Saransh Goila's Butter Chicken – With 150 minutes for the cook, Chloe, Jess and Sarah had to re-create a tandoori chicken in a butter sauce with coriander mint chutney, pickled onions and roomali bread by guest chef Saransh Goila. After Chloe was pronounced safe, Jess and Sarah missed the flavour palate of Saransh's dish. However, when the latter strayed in her recipe by grilling her chicken with the skin on, it left an unpleasant texture and charred bitterness to the dish. This was enough to eliminate Sarah.	873,000	#5
42/09-3	Tuesday, 3 July 2018	Immunity Challenge: Ashley Davis – Brendan, Khanh, Kristen and Samira were given an open pantry to pick only five ingredients to cook a dish without staples in the ten-minute first round. Khanh won the opportunity to compete against two-Michelin-star chef Ashley Davis in the second round. Between the two pantries, he was given the opportunity to select a 15-minute head start by picking the first pantry or losing the time advantage by choosing the second pantry also, and cooking with the chef in 60 minutes. Khanh risked the challenge by choosing both pantries to cook his duck breast with persimmon and ginger sauce. The dish scored 25 points but he lost to Ashley's dish of John Dory and abalone with autumn vegetables that scored 27 points.	848,000	#6
43/09-4	Wednesday, 4 July 2018	Royal Reception Catering Team Challenge – The Top 9 arrive at Darwin and are divided into teams of three to take charge of prepping 450 canapés (gluten-free, halal, savoury and vegetarian) with native Australian ingredients and local produce to cater a Royal reception for Prince Charles, his wife Camilla and 150 guests in three-and-a-half hours. During prep time, the White team struggled under Kristen's orders with their wattleseed baguettes and duck tarts lacking an accompaniment while the Blue team also fell behind with their zucchini canapés and lamb canapés. Despite having wasted their prep time making wallaby tartare for their canapés, the Red team's menu stood out in the tasting and won the challenge, sending the other two teams to elimination.	920,000	#5
44/09-5	Thursday, 5 July 2018	Nitmiluk National Park Elimination Challenge – The contestants arrive at the Nitmiluk National Park and Sashi used his last immunity pin to avoid the Elimination Challenge. Ben, Brendan, Jess, Kristen and Samira had 75 minutes to cook a dish inspired by their photographs of the surrounding scenery. Brendan prepped a fish dish with confit leeks and sea herbs, Jess made an inconsistently-cooked pork belly dish with apple purée and muntries, Kristen made a buttermilk-set custard with rosella consommé and peppermint gum oil, Samira cooked kangaroo fillets and crisps with smoked eggplant purée, and Ben cooked a barramundi cod paired with a lemon beurre blanc. After three of them were declared safe, Brendan and Jess faced the judges' verdict. Brendan had once again undercooked his dish and that was enough to send him home from the competition.	738,000	#5
Week 10 – Superpower Week
45/10-1	Sunday, 8 July 2018	Mini Box Challenge & Condiment Invention Test – The remaining contestants faced five consecutive challenges where losing contestants would be sent to elimination at the end of the week. To celebrate the tenth season, the surviving contestant would receive a special advantage after the last challenge. The first challenge was a Mystery Box where each contestant received a different single ingredient to cook three servings for the judges in 60 minutes. The bottom two was between Chloe (with inconsistently cooked duck) and Ben (with an overall dish of flat elements and underwhelming sauce) with the latter being the first contestant through to the elimination round. In the second challenge, the others had 75 minutes to make a dish that featured either oil, salt or pepper. While Khanh's dish was disjointed, Kristen lacked an accompaniment to counteract her dish and she became the second contestant to face elimination.	748,000	#5
46/10-2	Monday, 9 July 2018	TV Dinner Re-invention Cook-off – The six remaining contestants competed in the third challenge where three of the six picked their choice of the three frozen dinner meals to pit against their rivals and re-invent the dish in 75 minutes. Sashi picked fish 'n' chips to pit against Khanh, Chloe cooked against Jess with beef and three vegetables, and Samira chose the chicken meal to face Reece. They succeeded in beating their competitors to advance for tomorrow's next challenge.	830,000	#7
47/10-3	Tuesday, 10 July 2018	Time or Ingredients Cook-off – Chloe, Samira and Sashi had to gather their ingredients from up to four different hidden pantries, with one pantry being revealed every 15 minutes. Samira and Sashi selected dairy and canned food with 60 minutes left while Chloe waited for root vegetables and cooked in 45 minutes. Sashi's third dessert dish won praise from the judges, Chloe's beetroot salad was too simple with less ingredients after struggling in the cook but Samira's choice of one of her selected cheeses (gorgonzola) and anchovies clashed on the overall tasting which made her the sixth contestant to be sent to elimination.	821,000	#7
48/10-4	Wednesday, 11 July 2018	Panama Dining Room Service Challenge – Chloe and Sashi at the Panama Dining Room in Melbourne to cook a two-course meal for 30 customers under mentorship from Gary. For the main course, Sashi had to cook seafood while Chloe was assigned meat. After service, Chloe and Sashi had noticeable flaws in their dishes but Sashi struggled further in the prep time as he left an errant scale and bone in two of his fish dishes while his dessert had technical issues. This was enough to put him in the last spot for tomorrow's elimination round. For surviving all the challenges, Chloe was awarded the 10-Year Superpower Apron that grants her immunity from the judging in a future elimination challenge, right up to the tasting stage.	747,000	#8
49/10-5	Thursday, 12 July 2018	Pressure Test: Peter Gilmore's Snow Egg – The losing contestants from each challenge, except Reece who used his immunity pin, had to recreate three servings of Peter Gilmore's Snow Egg from season 2 in two-and-a-half hours and plate the dish in ten minutes. Jess produced a faultless replication of the dish, and was declared safe along with Ben and Khanh who also impressed. Samira, Sashi and Kristen made mistakes with each of their elements: it was a lack of fruit flavour in Samira's custard, the texture of Kristen's custard was grainy and her granita pretty much melted as soon as it hit the table, there's too much sugar in it, and Sashi's meringue was grainy on a platter. Consequently, Kristen's granita affected the balance of Peter's Snow Egg and it was enough to seal her elimination.	736,000	#5
49/10-5	Thursday, 12 July 2018	MasterClass: Gary Mehigan, George Calombaris, Matt Preston and Peter Gilmore – The judges presented their dishes to the contestants: Gary's venison and mushroom ravioli, George's crocodile avgolemono and Matt's crusted lamb shoulder with beetroot salad, while Peter presented his smoked pig jowl.	486,000	#12
Week 11
50/11-1	Sunday, 15 July 2018	Family Box Challenge & Vue de Monde Invention Test – The seven contestants received their ingredients in the Mystery Box from relatives or friends to cook their dishes. Sashi won the challenge over Jess and Reece to compete for a fast-track to Finals Week. With 75 minutes in the Invention Test set by Shannon Bennett, the others were tasked to make a dish that would feature in the degustation courses of his restaurant Vue de Monde. Chloe decided to use the 10-Year apron to skip the judging. Khanh beat Reece to go against Sashi for a place in the Finals as Ben, Jess and Samira were sent to the Pressure Test.	745,000	#5
51/11-2	Monday, 16 July 2018	Cryptic Pressure Test: Joe Grbac's Imperial Mandarin – Ben, Jess and Samira had to decipher Matt Preston's critic's review of the guest chef's dish to recreate it in three hours. The dish was Joe Grbac's yoghurt panna cotta and almond sponge with seven mandarin elements. All three succeeded with their dishes but Ben's panna cotta split and his jellies dissolved on the plate, forcing him to improvise before judging. Samira also struggled with both her panna cotta and custard didn't set after the cook despite having all her elements in the plate. Ultimately, the judges were unanimous and decide to eliminate her from the competition.	815,000	#8
52/11-3	Tuesday, 17 July 2018	Fast-Track to Finals Immunity Challenge: Reynold Poernomo and Matt Sinclair – Sashi and Khanh battled in the first round where they had an open pantry from the garden to make a dish. Khanh succeeded as he selected between the two pantries to face off against one of the two former contestants for an entry to the Finals: the savoury pantry against series 8 runner-up Matt Sinclair and the dessert pantry with Reynold Poernomo (from series 7) as his opponent. Khanh chose the savoury pantry and cooked a red emperor with mushroom and radish but lost to the creativity of Matt's Thai sausage with squid and curry that scored the perfect 30 points to Khanh's 24.	821,000	#6
53/11-4	Wednesday, 18 July 2018	SecondBite's Six-Course Degustation Challenge – The six contestants took responsibility of a six-course vegetarian degustation menu, supervised by George, at Melbourne's Luminare to raise funds for SecondBite, The winning dish would advance the contestant into the Finals. Chloe got the first course to highlight cucumber with smoked labneh. Khanh made a charred broccolini dish with a capsicum and cashew purée for course 2. Ben's course 3 dish was a celeriac fondant with dates. Jess featured mushrooms paired with eggplant and miso for the fourth course. For course 5, Sashi made a dessert of apples with cinnamon ice cream. Reece presented the last course of blackberry mousse with olives and tarragon. After service, the contestants raise $6,780 for the charity, with the judges matching the amount to $13,580. Out of the six, Chloe, Khanh and Sashi had the standout dishes and the latter won the pass to Finals Week.	863,000	#5
54/11-5	Thursday, 19 July 2018	Sudden Death Elimination Challenge – Ben, Chloe, Jess, Khanh and Reece competed in three rounds for places in the Finals. The first round was to identify the ingredients of Gary Mehigan's Moroccan tajine where Chloe and Khanh succeeded to advance. The next round was the one-inch cube challenge from season 8 where they had to identify each cube of ingredient while blind-folded. Ben survived the second round, leaving Jess and Reece to cook-off in the final round with 60 minutes each and all the correctly-identified ingredients from the first two rounds. Jess received praise with the combination of sweet and savoury in her dessert. While Reece's dish was complex and tasty, it was too greasy. That was enough to eliminate him from the competition.	852,000	#5
54/11-5	Thursday, 19 July 2018	MasterClass: George Calombaris, Matt Preston, Gary Mehigan and Curtis Stone – George cooked two versions of his Greek souvlaki, Matt made his vegetarian-style nachos and Gary braised his chicken paired with his spring onion pancakes. Curtis Stone returned to present his own take on steak and potatoes.	550,000	#10
Week 12 – Finals Week
55/12-1	Sunday, 22 July 2018	Finals Mystery Box Challenge & Invention Test – The finalists were assigned ingredients in a Mystery Box from past seasons: Ben (with the Burn Box from season 2), Chloe (with the Small Box from season 6), Jess (with the Molecular Gastronomy Box from season 5), Khanh (with the Big Box from season 7) and Sashi (with the Silver Box from season 6), to cook their dish in 60 minutes. Ben succeeded with his Pineapple Glazed Pork Ribs for an opportunity to compete for an advantage in the Finals Service Challenge. In the 75-minute Invention Test, the remaining finalists chose to cook desserts. Khanh's savoury dessert of pork and apples won overall praise, and he narrowly beat Chloe and advanced to the Advantage challenge, while the others were sent to the Pressure Test.	854,000	#5
56/12-2	Monday, 23 July 2018	Pressure Test: Ashley Palmer-Watts' Sherried Marron – Chloe, Jess and Sashi had to follow 90 steps of the recipe to replicate a marron dish by Ashley Palmer-Watts in four hours and forty-five minutes. The plate was composed of a grilled marron tail, marron tartare, smoked cauliflower, pickled daikon, marinated smoked shiitake mushrooms, pickled mushrooms, pickled dulse, sea vegetables and a sherry mushroom stock. During the tasting, Jess stood out with her take of the dish. That left Sashi and Chloe who won praise with their consommés but both had technical flaws in the tartare. While Sashi's lacked finesse, Chloe's was mushy and lacked balance which sealed her elimination.	918,000	#5
57/12-3	Tuesday, 24 July 2018	Season Affinity Duel Challenge – Ben, Jess, Khanh and Sashi competed in pairs to cook, inspired by one of the four seasons in two rounds with the winning finalist received an advantage for the Finals Service Challenge. The first round was Ben and Jess making their dishes describing Winter while Khanh and Sashi cook their Summer-themed dishes. In the second round to cook a dish representing Autumn in 60 minutes, Ben's Seared Coral Trout with Ginger Carrot Purée and Parsley Vinaigrette beat Sashi's Lamb Curry with Smoked Cauliflower to win. He will select one of the four courses for the next cook.	876,000	#5
58/12-4	Wednesday, 25 July 2018	Icebergs Dining Room Service Challenge – The finalists were tasked to cook their dishes in two-and a-half hours inspired by the Italian menu from the Icebergs Restaurant, under mentorship by executive chef Monty Koludrovic, to be served to the judges and 30 diners. Ben, who won the advantage yesterday, selected the fish course while the others were assigned the remaining course dishes: Sashi (with pasta), Jess (the meat course) and Khanh (for dessert). All of the dishes, except Sashi's pasta course, impressed the judges and between the three of them, they decided to vote Khanh's fig dessert to advance to the semi-finals.	906,000	#5
59/12-5	Sunday, 29 July 2018	World Class Service Elimination Challenge – Ben, Jess and Sashi each had 90 minutes to cook their dishes to be served for the judges and four Australian chefs: Danielle Alvarez of Fred's, The Bridge Room's Ross Lusted, Jock Zonfrillo from Orana and returning chef Lennox Hastie. Ben's Seared Coral Trout and Steamed Whiting with Crab Bisque delivered high acclaim and made it into the semi-finals which left Sashi and Jess for the final verdict. Sashi's Singaporean chicken rice received mixed reviews for the chicken despite winning praise for the flavour. The judges and chefs thought Jess impressed with her black sesame ice cream and yuzu curd but her praline cream and macerated raspberries derailed the overall flavour of her dish. Those factors were enough to see Jess eliminated from the competition.	872,000	#5
59/12-5	Sunday, 29 July 2018	MasterClass: Chefs vs. Contestants – The Top 3 semi-finalists selected their respective core ingredient for the judges (except Matt) to assign and cook with for 60 minutes. George, who cooked with tuna chosen by Ben, and Gary, who had fennel selected by Khanh, both produced standout dishes which ended in a draw. They then competed against the semi-finalists to cook dishes in 60 minutes and in a close decision, the judges won the challenge.	800,000	#6
Grand Finale Week
60/13-1	Monday, 30 July 2018	Semi-Finals: Service Challenge – In the four-hour service challenge, the semifinalists prep a two-course meal (main and dessert) to be served for the judges and 60 MasterChef alumni from past seasons as the guests. Sashi made his Chicken Lemak with Jasmine Rice and the judges once again criticised his carving of the protein but applauded his Malaysian Pineapple Tart with Lime Ice Cream. Ben elevated his take of his menu: a Surf n' Turf main and an intricate Pavlova with Berry Gelato and Champagne Foam which received overall praise and he was first through to the Finale. Khanh relied on his heritage and inspiration from his family to cook his traditional Canh Chua Ca and after attempting to improvise before service, the dish receive praise but it was less impressive from two of the judges. His chocolate mousse was too heavy as it impacted the texture of his dessert, and ultimately with both errors in the menu at this stage of the competition, that's enough to send him home.	961,000	#5
61/13-2	Tuesday, 31 July 2018	Grand Finale – The tenth-season finale consisted of only two rounds (instead of the usual three) with Ben and Sashi cooking their entrée and main in the first round. They had to highlight their dishes with the given ingredients in two hours. After the round, both of Ben's dishes didn't meet the standards in the judging – his crab with finger limes and avocado cream lacked texture and his coating for his deep-fried whiting with peas and garlic sauce was undercooked as he scored 20 points for his entrée as it lacked crunchiness and 21 points for the main as it was deemed too simple. Sashi stood out with his sambal prawns that received a perfect score and his fish curry scored 27 points (9 each). His total score was 57 points to Ben's 41. In the final round, they had to replicate an intricate dessert composed of 19 elements (yoghurt snow, steamed vanilla sponge, coconut ice cream, meringue, etc.) by Heston Blumenthal in five-and-a-half hours. The challenge was even for both of the finalists after struggling with one of their elements before completing the dish. In the tasting, both Sashi and Ben scored 36 points from all the judges. Based on the final results, Ben's overall score was 77 while Sashi won with the overall total of 93 points.	1,126,000	#3
61/13-2	Tuesday, 31 July 2018	Winner Announced – Sashi Cheliah was announced as the winner of the tenth season of MasterChef Australia, receiving the grand prize of $250,000 and a monthly column for Delicious. Ben Borsht won $40,000 as the runner-up while Khanh Ong won $10,000 after finishing in third place.	1,309,000	#1
