= MasterChef Australia series 9 =

MasterChef Australia
- Season 9
- Judges: Matt Preston; George Calombaris; Gary Mehigan
- No. of contestants: 24
- Winner: Diana Chan
- Runner-up: Ben Ungermann
- No. of episodes: 63

Release
- Original network: Network Ten
- Original release: 1 May – 24 July 2017

Series chronology
- ← Previous; Series 8 Next → Series 10

The ninth series of the Australian cooking game show MasterChef Australia premiered on 1 May 2017 on Network Ten. Judges Gary Mehigan, George Calombaris and Matt Preston from the previous series returned.

This series was won by Diana Chan in the grand finale against Ben Ungermann, on 24 July 2017.

== Changes ==
This series introduced the "Power Pin" in the seventh week. The pin granted the wearer an extra 15 minutes of cooking time in any one challenge until the finals.

== Contestants ==
=== Top 24 ===
The Top 24 contestants were announced on 1–3 May 2017. Chosen contestant Josh Clearihan was a previous auditionee from the eighth series who failed to reach the auditions when he was hospitalized with brain damage after a run-in with a car thief. The series featured other previous auditionees: Pia Gava, Benita Orwell and Eloise Praino.

| Contestant | Age | State | Occupation | Status |
|---|---|---|---|---|
| Diana Chan | 29 | VIC | Accountant | Winner 24 July |
| Ben Ungermann | 32 | QLD | Retail Manager | Runner-up 24 July |
| Karlie Verkerk | 26 | NSW | Copywriter | Eliminated 23 July |
| Tamara Graffen | 28 | WA | Engineering Officer | Eliminated 20 July; Returned 13 June; Eliminated 12 June |
| Arum Nixon | 34 | NSW | Advertising Strategist | Eliminated 18 July |
| Sarah Tiong | 26 | NSW | Risk Consultant | Eliminated 17 July |
| Eliza Wilson | 30 | VIC | Theatre Nurse | Eliminated 13 July |
| Eloise Praino | 32 | SA | Graduate Law Clerk | Eliminated 10 July |
| Callan Smith | 18 | NSW | Student | Eliminated 6 July |
| Sam Goodwin | 25 | VIC | Construction Coordinator | Eliminated 29 June |
| Nicole Stevenson | 24 | QLD | Medical Secretary | Eliminated 26 June |
| Michelle Lukman | 19 | VIC | Student | Eliminated 22 June |
| Ray Silva | 42 | NSW | Doctor | Eliminated 15 June |
| Samuel Whitehead | 26 | SA | Market Stall Owner | Eliminated 8 June |
| Pete Morgan | 31 | WA | Crane Operator | Eliminated 5 June |
| Jess Butler | 29 | VIC | Nurse | Eliminated 1 June |
| Trent Devincenzo | 27 | NSW | Systems Engineer | Eliminated 29 May |
| Benjamin Bullock | 27 | WA | Lawyer | Eliminated 25 May |
| Bryan Zhu | 23 | NSW | Photographer | Eliminated 22 May |
| Benita Orwell | 57 | QLD | Ex-Ground Staff | Eliminated 18 May |
| Pia Gava | 49 | VIC | Contracts Officer | Eliminated 15 May |
| Josh Clearihan | 32 | VIC | Senior IT Administrator | Eliminated 11 May |
| Lee Behan | 29 | WA | Hospitality Manager | Eliminated 8 May |
| Rashedul Hasan | 35 | NSW | IT Program Director | Eliminated 4 May |

Future appearances

- Diana Chan appeared in Series 10 at the auditions to support the Top 50. While Ben Ungermann, Karlie Verkerk, Tamara Griffin, Arum Nixon, Sarah Tiong, Eliza Wilson, Eloise Praino, Callan Smith, Sam Goodwin, Michelle Lukman & Bryce Zhu appeared at the Semi Final service challenge as guests.
- Ben was a guest judge of MasterChef Indonesia (season 5).
- Ben & Sarah appeared on Series 12. Ben withdrew from the competition on 18 May 2020, finishing 16th and Sarah was eliminated on 9 June 2020, finishing 10th.
- Diana, Eliza & Sam appeared on Series 16 as guests for the 1st service challenge.

== Guest Chefs ==
| Week | Guest Judge | Challenge |
|---|---|---|
| 1 | Maggie Beer | Auditions Part 2 |
| 1 | Anna Polyviou | Auditions Part 3 |
| 1 | Elena Duggan | Top 24 Mystery Box Challenge |
| 2 (Home Cooking; Week) | Jarrod Di Blasi | Immunity Challenge |
| 2 (Home Cooking; Week) | Johnny Di Francesco | Team Challenge |
| 3 | Ben Shewry | Mystery Box Challenge/Invention Test |
| 3 | Andy Bowdy | Pressure Test |
| 3 | Charlie Carrington | Immunity Challenge |
| 4 (Sweet Week) | Kirsten Tibballs | Mystery Box Challenge |
| 4 (Sweet Week) | Janice Wong | Invention Test |
| 4 (Sweet Week) | Christy Tania | Pressure Test |
| 4 (Sweet Week) | Lauren Eldridge | Immunity Challenge |
| 4 (Sweet Week) | Angélique Pereto | Immunity Challenge |
| 4 (Sweet Week) | Reynold Poernomo | Immunity Challenge |
| 4 (Sweet Week) | Darren Purchese | Team Challenge |
| 5 | David Thompson | Mystery Box Challenge/Invention Test |
| 5 | Josue Lopez | Pressure Test |
| 5 | Clinton McIver | Immunity Challenge |
| 6 (Yotam Week) | Yotam Ottolenghi | All Challenges & MasterClass |
| 6 (Yotam Week) | Blayne Bertoncello | Immunity Challenge |
| 7 | Curtis Stone | Mystery Box Challenge/Invention Test |
| 7 | Deniz Karaca | Pressure Test |
| 7 | Matt Sinclair | Team Challenge |
| 8 (Heston's Road Trip) | Heston Blumenthal | All Challenges & MasterClass |
| 9 | Peter Gilmore | Mystery Box Challenge/Invention Test |
| 9 | Paul Carmichael | Pressure Test |
| 9 | Ben Devlin | Immunity Challenge |
| 10 (Japan Week) | Tsutomu Kodama | Service Challenge |
| 10 (Japan Week) | Takayuki Odaka | MasterClass |
| 10 (Japan Week) | Kagehisa Imada | MasterClass |
| 11 | Kylie Millar | Pressure Test |
| 11 | Federico Zanellato | Immunity Challenge |
| 11 | Clare Smyth | Service Challenge |
| 12 | Shaun Quade | Pressure Test |
| 12 | Peter Gilmore | Elimination Challenge |
| 12 | Ross Lusted | Elimination Challenge |
| 12 | Alla Wolf-Tasker | Elimination Challenge |
| 12 | Ashley Palmer-Watts | Service Challenge |
| 12 | Curtis Stone | MasterClass |
| Finals | Kirsten Tibballs | Grand Finale |

== Elimination chart ==
| No. | Week | 1 | | 2 | | 3 | | 4 | | 5 | | 6 | | 7 | | | 8 | 9 | | 10 | | 11 | | Finals | | | | |
|---|---|---|---|---|---|---|---|---|---|---|---|---|---|---|---|---|---|---|---|---|---|---|---|---|---|---|---|---|
| No. | Mystery Box Challenge Winner | Bryan; Callan; Pia; Sam | | Eloise | | Ray | | Pete | | Karlie | | Karlie | | Sam | | | Diana | Tamara | | Diana | | Arum | | Ben | | | Diana | |
| No. | Invention Test Winner | None | | Eliza; Karlie; Sarah | | Eloise; Sam; Sarah | | Callan; Diana; Sam | | Ben; Samuel; Tamara | | Diana; Karlie; Tamara | | Karlie (Power Pin) | | | None | Eliza; Eloise; Sarah | | Ben | | Arum; Eliza; Tamara | | Arum; Ben; Tamara | | | Ben | |
| No. | Immunity Challenge | None | | Lose: Sarah | | Win: Eloise | | Lose: Callan; Diana; Sam | | Lose: Tamara | | Lose: Karlie | | None | | | None | Lose: Sarah | | Win: Sarah | | Win: Arum | | None | | | None | |
| 1 | Diana | Top 24 | IN | IN | Team Win | IN | Team Win | Top 3 | Team Win | IN | Team Win 1 | Top 3 | Team Lose | Top 3 | | Team Win | Btm 9 | IN | Team Lose | IN | Team Win | Btm 3 | Top 3 | Btm 3 | Top 3 | Btm 3 | Top 2 | WINNER |
| 2 | Ben | Top 24 | IN | IN | Team Win | IN | Team Lose | IN | Team Win | Top 3 | Team Lose | IN | Team Win | IN | | Team Lose | Team Win | IN | Team 3rd | Top 3 | Team 2nd | Btm 3 | Top 2 | Top 3 | Btm 2 | ADV | Top 2 | Runner-up |
| 3 | Karlie | Top 24 | IN | Top 3 | Team Win | IN | Team 3rd | IN | Team Win | IN | Btm 5 | Top 3 | Team Lose | Top 3 | P.P. | Team Win | Btm 9 | IN | Team 3rd | Top 3 | Team Win | IN | Btm 3 | Btm 3 | Top 3 | Btm 3 | 3rd | Eliminated (Ep 62) |
| 4 | Tamara | Top 24 | IN | IN | Team Lose | IN | Team 3rd | IN | Btm 3 | Top 3 | Team Win 2 | Top 3 | Btm 3 | Elim | | Team Lose | Btm 9 | IN | Team Win | IN | Team Lose | Top 3 | Btm 3 | Top 3 | Top 3 | Elim | Eliminated (Ep 61) | |
| 5 | Arum | Top 24 | IN | IN | Team Lose | IN | Team Lose | IN | Team Win | IN | Team Win 2 | IN | Btm 3 | Btm 4 | | Team Lose | Team Win | Btm 3 | Team 2nd | IN | Team 2nd | Top 3 | ADV | Top 3 | Elim | Eliminated (Ep 59) | | |
| 6 | Sarah | Top 24 | IN | Top 3 | Team Win | Top 3 | Team 3rd | IN | Team Win | IN | Team Win 2 | IN | Team Lose | IN | | Team Win | Btm 9 | Top 3 | Team Win | Top 3 | Team Lose | IN | Btm 3/Imm. | Elim | Eliminated (Ep 58) | | | |
| 7 | Eliza | Top 24 | IN | Top 3 | Team Win | IN | Team Win | IN | Team Win | IN | Team Win 1 | IN | Team Win | IN | | Team Win | Team Win | Top 3 | Team 2nd | IN | Team 2nd | Top 3 | Elim | Eliminated (Ep 56) | | | | |
| 8 | Eloise | Top 24 | IN | IN | Team Lose | Top 3 | Team Win | IN | Team Lose/Imm. | IN | Team Win 2 | Btm 3 | Team Win | IN | | Saved | Btm 9 | Top 3 | Team Lose | IN | Team Win | Elim | Eliminated (Ep 53) | | | | | |
| 9 | Callan | Top 24 | Top 4 | IN | Team Win | IN | Team Win | Top 3 | Team Lose | IN | Btm 3 | IN | Team Win | IN | | Team Win | Btm 9 | Btm 3 | Btm 2 | IN | Elim | Eliminated (Ep 50) | | | | | | |
| 10 | Sam | Top 24 | Top 4 | IN | Team Lose | Top 3 | Team Win | Top 3 | Team Win | Btm 3 | Team Win 1 | IN | Team Lose | Btm 4 | | Team Lose | Btm 3 | IN | Elim | Eliminated (Ep 45) | | | | | | | | |
| 11 | Nicole | Top 24 | IN | IN | Team Lose | IN | Btm 2 | IN | Team Lose | IN | Team Lose | IN | Team Win | IN | | Team Win | Btm 3 | Elim | Eliminated (Ep 42) | | | | | | | | | |
| 12 | Michelle | Top 24 | IN | IN | Btm 4 | IN | Team 3rd | IN | Team Lose | IN | Team Lose | IN | Team Win | Top 3 | | Team Lose | Elim | Eliminated (Ep 40) | | | | | | | | | | |
| 13 | Ray | Top 24 | IN | Btm 3 | Team Win | Btm 3 | Team Win | IN | Btm 3 | IN | Team Win 1 | Btm 3 | Team Win | Btm 4 | | Elim | Eliminated (Ep 35) | | | | | | | | | | | |
| 14 | Samuel | Top 24 | IN | IN | Team Lose | IN | Team Win | Btm 3 | Team Lose | Top 3 | Btm 5 | IN | Elim | Eliminated (Ep 30) | | | | | | | | | | | | | | |
| 15 | Pete | Top 24 | IN | Btm 3 | Team Win | Btm 3 | Team Lose | IN | Team Win | IN | Btm 3 | Elim | Eliminated (Ep 27) | | | | | | | | | | | | | | | |
| 16 | Jess | Top 24 | IN | IN | Btm 4 | IN | Team 3rd | IN | Team Lose | Btm 3 | Elim | Eliminated (Ep 25) | | | | | | | | | | | | | | | | |
| 17 | Trent | Top 24 | IN | IN | Team Win | IN | Team Win | Btm 3 | Team Win | Elim | Eliminated (Ep 22) | | | | | | | | | | | | | | | | | |
| 18 | Benjamin | Top 24 | Btm 4 | IN | Btm 4 | IN | Team Win | IN | Elim | Eliminated (Ep 20) | | | | | | | | | | | | | | | | | | |
| 19 | Bryan | Top 24 | Top 4 | IN | Team Win | IN | Team Win | Elim | Eliminated (Ep 17) | | | | | | | | | | | | | | | | | | | |
| 20 | Benita | Top 24 | Btm 4 | IN | Team Win | IN | Elim | Eliminated (Ep 15) | | | | | | | | | | | | | | | | | | | | |
| 21 | Pia | Top 24 | Top 4 | IN | Team Lose | Elim | Eliminated (Ep 12) | | | | | | | | | | | | | | | | | | | | | |
| 22 | Josh | Top 24 | IN | IN | Elim | Eliminated (Ep 10) | | | | | | | | | | | | | | | | | | | | | | |
| 23 | Lee | Top 24 | Btm 4 | Elim | Eliminated (Ep 7) | | | | | | | | | | | | | | | | | | | | | | | |
| 24 | Rashedul | Top 24 | Elim | Eliminated (Ep 5) | | | | | | | | | | | | | | | | | | | | | | | | |
| | | Eliminated | Rashedul | Lee | Josh | Pia | Benita | Bryan | Benjamin | Trent | Jess | Pete | Samuel | Tamara; 1st Elimination | | Ray | Michelle | Nicole | Sam | Callan | | Eloise | Eliza | Sarah | Arum | Tamara; Re-elimination | Karlie | Ben; 89 points |
| | | Eliminated | Rashedul | Lee | Josh | Pia | Benita | Bryan | Benjamin | Trent | Jess | Pete | Samuel | Tamara; 1st Elimination | | Ray | Michelle | Nicole | Sam | Callan | | Eloise | Eliza | Sarah | Arum | Tamara; Re-elimination | Karlie | Diana; 90 points (win) |

== Episodes and ratings ==
Colour key:
– Highest rating during the series
– Lowest rating during the series

| Ep#/Wk-Ep# | Original airdate | Episode Title / Event | Total viewers (five metro cities) | Nightly Ranking |
Week 1
| 1/01-1 | Monday, 1 May 2017 | Series Premiere: Auditions Part 1 - The ninth series started with contestants cooking their signature dish in one hour for an automatic entry to the Top 24. Each judge awarded contestants with a "yes" or "no". Twenty contestants received three "yes" votes and won their way through to the main competition while the second-chance contestants, with one or two "yes" votes, were to cook again in the next episode. | 1,060,000 | #5 |
| 2/01-2 | Tuesday, 2 May 2017 | Auditions Part 2 - Maggie Beer set a challenge for the twelve contestants who received a second chance to cook either a savoury dish or a dessert in 75 minutes, with lemons as the core ingredient, to secure a place in the competition. The top three dishes were chosen by Maggie and the judges sent their makers to join the Top 24. The bottom three who failed to impress the judges were eliminated while the remaining six competed for their last chance to secure the 24th spot in the next day's pressure test. In the end, it was Eliza, Lee and Sarah who received an apron each during the tasting after earning overall praise from the judges with their respective dishes. | 913,000 | #6 |
| 3/01-3 | Wednesday, 3 May 2017 | Auditions Part 3 - To win the last apron and secure a spot in the Top 24, the remaining contestants faced a pressure test set by Anna Polyviou. They had three and a half hours to recreate her intricate firecracker-based dessert consisting of ten technical components The two hopefuls who delivered the best dishes were considered by the judges for the last spot in the Top 24. Arum's dish was declared the best and he won the last apron. | 917,000 | #5 |
| 4/01-4 | Thursday, 4 May 2017 | Top 24 Mystery Box Challenge - In their first challenge of the season, the Top 24 contestants faced a mystery box that consisted of ingredients chosen by Elena Duggan, the winner of season 8. Cooking with 75 minutes on the clock, most contestants opted to cook a pasta dish while others chose to make an inventive dish. Rashedul suffered a major setback when he dropped a dish containing many of his elements in the final minute of cooking time. In the end, it was Sam, Callan, Pia and Bryan who were declared the Top 4 while Rashedul was sent to elimination along with Lee, Benjamin and Benita. | 899,000 | #6 |
| 5/01-5 | Thursday, 4 May 2017 | Hidden Pairs Elimination Challenge - Benita, Benjamin, Lee and Rashedul competed in the first elimination challenge. Each had to pick an ingredient of their choice next to a cloche that contained a hidden paired ingredient and make a dish in 75 minutes. Rashedul selected mangoes paired with green peppercorns, Benjamin had walnuts and dates, Benita got peaches and Earl Grey tea, and Lee chose salmon with aniseed. Benita's risk of producing an ice cream dessert didn't pay off, forcing her to change it into a custard dish. Benjamin received criticism for the presentation of his katoumari but received overall praise on the taste. Lee also won praise from the judges for his dish. Rashedul struggled to think of a dish and chose to make a mango, mint and peppercorn sorbet. The judges couldn't taste the green peppercorn in his sorbet, which meant it did not meet the brief of highlighting both ingredients, and that was enough to eliminate him. | 910,000 | #5 |
Week 2 - Home Cooking Week
| 6/02-1 | Sunday, 7 May 2017 | Judges' Mystery Box Challenge and Invention Test - The 23 remaining contestants could only rely on the basics of home cooking for the week by using simple kitchen equipment. They faced a Mystery Box Challenge with ingredients like prawns, chillies, pineapple and Parmesan, that were chosen by the judges for the 75-minute cook. Sarah, Pia, Diana, Michelle and Eloise were chosen as the Top 5 and Eloise won the challenge and the advantage with her Pineapple Tarte Tatin with Pumpkin Chilli Caramel the advantage for the choice of the core ingredient for the Invention Test. She chose halloumi (over fennel and mussels). This ingredient caused some of the contestants to struggle throughout the 75-minute cook, including Lee, Ray and Pete, who found themselves in elimination. Eliza, Karlie and Sarah managed to champion the cheese in creative ways and were declared the Top 3. | 767,000 | #5 |
| 7/02-2 | Monday, 8 May 2017 | Pressure Test: Gary Mehigan's Roast Chicken, Peas and Potatoes - Lee, Pete and Ray had to follow and recreate Gary's roasted chicken dish without a recipe provided; they had to follow the chef before plating the dish within 10 seconds of Gary. Ray struggled throughout as he poured too much cream in his pea custard and his fondant potatoes were cooked inconsistently. Pete fell behind when he tried to prepare his vegetable jus, but his dish received overall praise and he was saved. Throughout the challenge, Lee started well and his dish impressed the judges, but it was his cooking of the chicken that let him down as he failed to sear the flesh side of the protein at the end of the cook. | 861,000 | #8 |
| 8/02-3 | Tuesday, 9 May 2017 | Immunity Challenge: Jarrod Di Blasi - In the 32-minute first round, Eliza, Sarah and Karlie had to make a savoury dinner plate with just one trip to the pantry. Sarah's Pan Friend Barramundi with Bok Choy and Vinaigrette won the round and she advanced to the Immunity Challenge against Jarrod Di Blasi, who was the Victorian Young Chef of the Year. She chose one of the judges’ home fridges (Gary's which contained Asian Ingredients) and with 75 minutes, prepped an XO Marinated Steak with Pickled Mushrooms and Potato Mash while Jarrod made a Sashimi of Whiting with Roast Bone Dressing and Avocado Puree in 60 minutes. Jarrod received overall praise on the creativity of his dish while Sarah's dish also pleased the judges but her mashed potatoes and her marinade divided the judges’ opinions, giving her 23 points to Jarrod's 27. | 979,000 | #4 |
| 9/02-4 | Wednesday, 10 May 2017 | 400 Gradi Team Challenge - The contestants arrived at the 400 Gradi Pizzeria, headed by World Pizza Champion Johnny Di Francesco, for a team challenge, where they were split into two teams of 10 and given fours to prepare an Italian three-course meal for 250 people. The Green and Red Teams, led by Diana and Eloise, respectively, had to make two pizzas, a pasta dish and a dessert. During their first challenge, both teams struggled in prepping their respective pizza doughs and desserts. The Red Team's pizzas received more praise than the Green Team's, whose pizzas had technical issues with the topping and crust. However, the judges slammed their bland pasta and heavy sponge dessert, and sent the Red Team into elimination. | 876,000 | #5 |
| 10/02-5 | Thursday, 11 May 2017 | Potato Elimination Challenge - The 10 members of the Red Team faced a two-round elimination challenge featuring potatoes. In the first round, they had 60 minutes to cook a classic side dish of chips and dip. Samuel, Arum and Eloise made the three best dishes, while Benjamin, Jess, Josh and Michelle served soggy chips, sending them to the second round, in which they had 60 minutes to make another a dish using potatoes. Jess and Michelle delivered exemplary dishes. While one of Benjamin's sweet potato doughnuts was mushy, Josh's undercooking of his potato resulted in his gnocchi being lumpy and his elimination. | 875,000 | #5 |
| 10/02-5 | Thursday, 11 May 2017 | MasterClass: George Calombaris, Gary Mehigan and Matt Preston - The judges individually presented their respective simple dishes to the contestants in their MasterClass: George demonstrated the cooking of broccoli on a grill, Gary presented a dessert that featured chocolate and beetroot, and Matt cooked nuggets and chips. Gary helped George make his Lamb Tortellini with Butter Sauce and Yoghurt Dressing. | 669,000 | #8 |
Week 3
| 11/03-1 | Sunday, 14 May 2017 | Ben Shewry's All-Australian Mystery Box Challenge and Invention Test - Ben Shewry showcased a mystery box that consisted of Australian ingredients. After 75 minutes, the Top 5 were Jess, Tamara, Trent, Nicole and Ray, and the latter won the challenge. Ray's advantage in the invention test was to choose one of three cooking techniques that had the contestants had to highlight in their dishes. Throughout the second challenge, Ray, despite choosing smoking as the highlight of his dish, under-cooked his crayfish and under-smoked his broth, while Pia failed to plate up all of her components. Sarah, Sam and Eloise impressed with their inventive dishes while Ray and Pia were joined by Pete in the Bottom 3. | 734,000 | #5 |
| 12/03-2 | Monday, 15 May 2017 | Pressure Test: Andy Bowdy's "Rita" - Pete, Pia and Ray had four and a half hours to recreate pastry chef Andy Bowdy's signature twelve element intricate layered cake. The judges were impressed with Pete's dish overall, despite the fact that he burned his second batch of candied pecans, and he was declared safe. Ray lost points in the presentation of his cake layers, but was praised on the tasting apart from his thick biscuit base. Although Pia's dish had the best presentation, her bavarois was heavy and her meringue was too grainy. In the end, the errors in Pia's dessert outweighed Ray's bulging cake appearance, sealing her elimination. | 868,000 | #9 |
| 13/03-3 | Tuesday, 16 May 2017 | Immunity Challenge: Charlie Carrington - In the 45-minute first round, Eloise, Sam and Sarah were tasked to cook a dish using a waffle maker. While Sam and Sarah opted for the sweet option for their waffle dishes, Eloise's savoury take on chicken and waffles with chili soy caramel won her the opportunity to cook against chef Charlie Carrington of Atlas Dining in Melbourne. Eloise had the advantage to beat the chef by choosing the ‘indulgent’ pantry, which contained sweet ingredients and, with 75 minutes, made a dessert of chocolate and peanut butter. The judges applauded Eloise's dish over Charlie's midnight snack dish, which left them uncertain of his mascarpone ginger beer foam, awarding her the immunity pin with 28 points to Charlie's 21. | 1,045,000 | #4 |
| 14/03-4 | Wednesday, 17 May 2017 | Relay Team Challenge - Four teams competed in a relay challenge where each member had 15 minutes of cooking time and 45 seconds to pass their instructions to the next cook. Diana, Benjamin, Tamara and Benita, the captains of the Red, Yellow, Blue and Green Teams, were tasked with choosing a dish that featured maple syrup. Benita and Tamara chose the savoury option for their dishes (Green's Singaporean Chilli Crab and Prawns, and Blue's Asian Sticky Pork Belly with Bao Buns and Slaw) while Benjamin and Diana opted for maple ice cream desserts. Throughout the following changeovers, Benita's choice of dish confused her team members when she decided to replace the palm sugar with the syrup at the start of the cook, the Red Team struggled with their jelly element which they failed to plate at the last minute and the Yellow Team provided improvements to their dish. Michelle, who was the third to cook for the Blue Team, struggled throughout and tampered with the elements of her team's dish, forcing the last two members to salvage it. The Yellow and Red Teams were applauded for their desserts despite the latter missing the jelly in their dish, while the judges praised Diana's leadership and organization of her team's dish. The Blue Team's was criticised for overcooking their pork while the maple flavour couldn't be detected in the Green Team's dish despite the fact that they used all of the syrup throughout the cook. As their dish failed to highlight the core ingredient, the Green Team was sent to elimination. | 958,000 | #5 |
| 15/03-5 | Thursday, 18 May 2017 | Time Shopping Elimination Challenge - Arum, Ben, Benita, Nicole and Pete faced the elimination challenge, in which each contestant could bid part of his/her 90 minutes' cooking time to purchase their ingredients. Each pantry of ingredients (except the staples) cost different minutes of time. Arum and Nicole spent 20 minutes on ginger, sugar and pistachios. Ben had John Dory, artichokes and vanilla beans that cost him 15 minutes. Benita decided to spend 45 minutes on prawns, ginger, coriander and kecap manis, while Pete bought cherries, vanilla beans, sugar and pistachios for 25 minutes. Arum's cake was loved by the judges with Ben's dish also receiving praise, while Pete had issues in plating his cake but stood out in the tasting. Nicole made a pudding that was crumbled and dry which lacked sauce. Benita faced problems during the cook, presenting an underwhelming dish, and despite her efforts in improvising her burnt broth, it was not enough to save her from elimination. | 935,000 | #5 |
Week 4 - Sweet Week
| 16/04-1 | Sunday, 21 May 2017 | Kirsten Tibballs' Mystery Box Challenge and Flower Affinity Invention Test - The daily challenges in the coming week focused the contestants on cooking desserts. Kirsten Tibballs presented her Mystery Box, which contained chocolate and her chosen ingredients (coconut, raspberries, mint, instant coffee, coffee beans, green tea, nectarines, desiccated coconut and dark rum) along with additional pantry dessert staples, for the contestants to make their dish in 30 minutes. Bryan, Eloise, Arum, Eliza and Pete were chosen for tasting and impressed the judges with the creativity of their desserts, with Pete winning the advantage in the invention test, which was set by Janice Wong. He was rewarded an extra 30-minute head start with Janice mentoring him in making a dish inspired by flowers, but it was Callan, Diana and Sam who thrived in highlighting the flowers in their desserts and won the chance to cook for immunity. Samuel and Trent had technical issues in their dishes while Bryan's dessert had too many elements and the flavours in his dish did not balance together correctly. Therefore, the three of them were sent to the pressure test. | 839,000 | #7 |
| 17/04-2 | Monday, 22 May 2017 | Pressure Test: Christy Tania's Ice Cream Float - Bryan, Samuel and Trent had three hours to replicate Christy Tania's gravity-defying ice cream dessert and thirty minutes to make their sugar balloons. The time pressure proved too much for the three contestants as they had issues in their dishes: Trent's balloon was too small as it dispersed when he presented his dish, Samuel used excess chocolate to cover the crevice of his cone after he poured his hot chocolate sauce during the cook, and Bryan's semifreddo was too dense and contained dollops of meringue in the mixture, while he ran out of time to make his balloon. Ultimately, Trent and Samuel scored on taste and presentation, respectively. Despite having a good run in the competition, Bryan's first pressure test sealed his elimination. | 936,000 | #8 |
| 18/04-3 | Tuesday, 23 May 2017 | Immunity Challenge: Lauren Eldridge, Angélique Pereto and Reynold Poernomo - As a team, Callan, Diana and Sam individually competed against one of three guest pastry chefs for immunity. By knife draw, Sam was pitted against chef Lauren Eldridge, Diana faced chef Angélique Pereto and Callan cooked against KOI Dessert Bar's Reynold Poernomo (from season 7). In 75 minutes, Diana made a dark chocolate sorbet with orange sauce, Sam made a deconstructed black forest gateaux and Callan baked a layered sponge cake with fruits, jelly, toffee and chocolate ganache. In 60 minutes, Reynold made a mango cream with spiced pineapple and lemongrass ginger consommé, Angélique made a green tea dessert with coconut and raspberry, and Lauren presented a honeycomb with crème fraiche ice cream. While Reynold's dessert scored 27 points, the judges felt Callan's use of chocolate ganache was unnecessary and gave him 16 points. Diana's dish was liked by the judges, but was criticized for being an inefficient use of the allotted time and lacking finesse, but Angélique highly impressed the judges with the creativity of her dessert, giving her a perfect score of 30 versus Diana's 18. While Sam earned rave reviews for his dish, Lauren's use of two simple elements and precision earned her high praise, and she won, 28-27. | 899,000 | #7 |
| 19/04-4 | Wednesday, 24 May 2017 | Edible Dessert Greenhouse Art Team Challenge - The two teams were tasked by Darren Purchese with constructing edible dessert art installations in their respective stations for public viewing in eight hours. The Red Team, led by Sarah, chose a Japanese Zen garden concept, while the Blue Team, led by Tamara, took inspiration from a beehive. During prep time, the Red Team overcooked their first batch of dehydrated strawberry cherry blossoms, which forced them to only make 300 blossoms, while the Blue Team took too long to make their honeycomb biscuits and build their cookie cutters. Afterwards, both teams were praised in their creativity by the judges, but the Blue Team's installations lacked balance in the sweetness of each element over the Red Team's and landed them in elimination. | 845,000 | #7 |
| 20/04-5 | Thursday, 25 May 2017 | Blind Ingredient Tasting Elimination Challenge - The nine losing contestants (except Eloise, who used her immunity pin) had to correctly guess each ball of a dessert ingredient while blindfolded, to avoid landing in one of three places in the second elimination round. The bottom three: Ray (who mistook grapes for watermelon), Benjamin (banana instead of rockmelon) and Tamara (cucumber rather than rockmelon), had 75 minutes to make a dessert with the ingredient they guessed incorrectly. Both Tamara and Ray impressed with their dishes but, while Ray struggled throughout the challenge, Benjamin overcooked his bananas and he was sent home. | 879,000 | #4 |
Week 5
| 21/05-1 | Sunday, 28 May 2017 | David Thompson's Mystery Box Challenge and Invention Test - Thai cuisine expert and chef David Thompson set up a Mystery Box Challenge for the contestants, where they had to cook a dish with his chosen Thai ingredients, with Tamara, Diana, Michelle, Karlie and Samuel selected as the Top 5. Karlie won the advantage in the invention test, which was the choice between two of Thompson's dishes. The contestants had 75 minutes to cook an inventive dish using the ingredients of the chosen dish. She chose his pineapple and crab curry (over his tom yum soup) and several contestants prospered with their dishes to compete for three places in the immunity challenge. Tamara, Ben and Samuel had the top dishes chosen by the judges. Jess, Sam and Trent had technical errors in their dishes and were sent to the pressure test. | 737,000 | #6 |
| 22/05-2 | Monday, 29 May 2017 | Pressure Test: Josue Lopez's "After the Eucalypt Fire" - Jess, Sam and Trent had three hours to replicate "After the Eucalypt Fire", a 14-element emu dish made by Josue Lopez, Brisbane's Chef of the Year. Sam was first to be declared safe despite the fact that his beetroot leaf puree was grainy. Jess' puree was bitter and lacked vibrance, but while Trent was praised for the cooking of his emu, his plating was unorganized and the essential crispy elements were missing, which resulted in his elimination. | 765,000 | #11 |
| 23/05-3 | Tuesday, 30 May 2017 | Immunity Challenge: Clinton McIver - Ben, Samuel and Tamara had 45 minutes to recreate a classic macaroni and cheese in the first round. Tamara's chili mac 'n’ cheese was the best, and she won the chance to cook off against Melbourne chef Clinton McIver of Amaru. From a choice of herbs, she chose rosemary and made Chicken Rosemary Garlic Dumplings with Chicken Broth in 75 minutes, while Clinton made a Rosemary Lamb with Pickled Vegetables and Pear in 60 minutes. Both of their dishes were praised on simplicity but Clinton's modern flavours of his dish beat Tamara's overall quality presentation, 27 points to 26. | 874,000 | #6 |
| 24/05-4 | Wednesday, 31 May 2017 | South Melbourne Market Team Challenge - The four teams were taken to the South Melbourne Market, where they had to cook two snacks (savoury and sweet) and sell them to 1000 people, with only two teams to be pronounced safe for delivering the best dishes and earning the most money from the public. All teams struggled to plan their dishes: Michelle's Yellow Team attempted to estimate the mass of their ingredients, Tamara's Green Team took a lot of time to prepare their food and Sam's Blue Team had issues with the lime curd in their dessert. After service, the teams made $13,728 to be donated to Kidney Health Australia. The judges applauded the Blue Team's dishes, which were free from flaws and declared the team safe. The Green Team was also safe with takings of $4,158, sending the other two teams to the elimination challenge. | 704,000 | #10 |
| 25/05-5 | Thursday, 1 June 2017 | Three Dishes from Six Eggs Elimination Challenge - The eight losing contestants faced a three-round elimination challenge where they had to cook dishes in 45 minutes with only six eggs available. Ben, Michelle and Nicole had the top dishes in the first round. Karlie and Samuel excelled in the second round, sending Callan, Jess and Pete to the final elimination round. The judges doubted Pete's choice of cooking a simple steak and chips with a fried egg but they applauded his dish in the tasting. Callan was also safe with the creativity of his smoked egg yolk. Jess’ flavours of her dish were flat while her egg cracked in the cooking which was overdone, and she was eliminated. | 778,000 | #6 |
Week 6 - Yotam Week
| 26/06-1 | Sunday, 4 June 2017 | Yotam's Mystery Box Challenge and Invention Test - Celebrity chef and writer Yotam Ottolenghi made his first appearance as this week's guest judge. His Mystery Box contained the following ingredients, used in Middle Eastern cuisine: freekeh, tahini paste, lamb, date syrup, parsley, eggplant, rose water and sumac. After 75 minutes against Michelle, Eliza, Sarah and Ben, Karlie won her second mystery box challenge, gaining the advantage of a 30-minute head start in the invention test, where she had to cook a stuffed dish in 60 minutes. She then won the invention test and joined Diana and Tamara with immunity. Pete and Ray, who faced their third pressure test, were joined by Eloise, after all three served undercooked dishes. | 794,000 | #6 |
| 27/06-2 | Monday, 5 June 2017 | Pressure Test: Yotam Ottolenghi's Mezze Feast - Eloise, Pete and Ray had one hour to recreate five dishes from Yotam's mezze: lamb koftas, deep fried olives, butter bean hummus and roasted ricotta with broad bean spread. Eloise won praise for the overall taste and quality of her dishes. Ray also won praise with his feast, but served large chunks of onions in his koftas and some dishes that were under-seasoned. Pete's disorganized plating failed in presentation while his flatbreads and fried olives received praise in the tasting, but he overcooked his lamb and pomegranate jam, which saw him eliminated. | 767,000 | #12 |
| 28/06-3 | Tuesday, 6 June 2017 | Immunity Challenge: Blayne Bertoncello - Karlie, Tamara and Diana competed in the first round, in which each of them took turns naming one of the 25 ingredients of Yotam's pastilla. Diana and Tamara were eliminated in consecutive guesses, which left Karlie to cook against O.MY head chef Blayne Bertoncello. Both of them had to feature the ingredients from the first round to cook their dishes. In 75 minutes, Karlie cooked Braised Chicken with Onion Sauce, Chipotle and Tomato while Blayne made a Tomato Salad with Chicken in 60 minutes. Karlie was praised for the cooking of her dish but received mixed reviews on the blubbery chicken skin. While Blayne's salad lacked acidity, it received overall praise for its taste and presentation, winning by 35 points to 30. | 927,000 | #7 |
| 29/06-4 | Wednesday, 7 June 2017 | Vegetarian Feast Team Challenge - For their next team challenge, the contestants were split into two teams of seven and had to cook a feast featuring vegetable-based dishes to impress 10 meat-eating guests and the judges. In the two-hour prep time, Callan's uncertain leadership and decisions pushed the Blue Team over the edge while both teams had issues in cooking their flatbreads. In the tasting, both teams' dishes were praised for highlighting the brief but their flatbreads were undercooked and, despite Callan's restrained leadership, the Green Team overused their sour plum compote which diluted and imbalanced their fried halloumi dish and sent them to elimination. | 868,000 | #6 |
| 30/06-5 | Thursday, 8 June 2017 | Visual Perception Elimination Challenge - The seven contestants on the Green Team took turns identifying a chosen sliced cross-section of an ingredient. Incorrect guesses led to three contestants being sent to the elimination round. Arum, Samuel, and Tamara then had 75 minutes to cook a dish using the pantry of ingredients that were guessed correctly in the first round. Arum's apple dessert was applauded, saving him from elimination. The verdict came down to Tamara, whose fruit tart had unusual flavour combinations, and Samuel, whose vegetable tart had disproportionate quantities. The latter was eliminated as a result. | 834,000 | #5 |
| 30/06-5 | Thursday, 8 June 2017 | MasterClass: Yotam Ottolenghi, George Calombaris and Gary Mehigan - Yotam, with assistance from Matt, presented three dishes to the contestants: a salad of cauliflower, shallots, barberries and pistachios, scotch eggs with aubergine and manchego; and a pistachio and rose semolina cake. George cooked one of the dishes from his Press Club restaurant: a potato skordalia, while Gary made a savoury yabby tomato tart. | 562,000 | #10 |
Week 7
| 31/07-1 | Sunday, 11 June 2017 | Curtis Stone's Mystery Box Challenge and Power Pin Invention Test - Curtis Stone presented the ingredients for the Mystery Box challenge. Sam beat Diana and Ray to secure the advantage in the invention test. He chose the following three core ingredients: kingfish, capers and turnips from farmers' produce. This season introduced the Power Pin, which granted the wearer 15 minutes extra time in any individual challenge until the finals. The best dish in this invention test won its maker the pin. Diana, Karlie and Michelle were named the Top 3 with Karlie delivering the winning dish for the pin. The four contestants who were sent to the pressure test were Arum, Ray, Sam and Tamara. | 605,000 | #8 |
| 32/07-2 | Monday, 12 June 2017 | Pressure Test: Deniz Karaca's "Passion for Caramel" - Arum, Ray, Sam and Tamara had three hours to recreate pastry chef and chocolatier Deniz Karaca's chocolate caramel tart. While some of them struggled in replicating the various elements, Arum's dessert was the dish of the day. Though Sam's tart was too soft and his passionfruit jam lacked flavour, Tamara left her tempered chocolate garnishes off her plate, while her cremeux leaked into her tart shell and her caramel crème was undercooked. Ultimately, the caramelization of the mousse was vital to the dish and Tamara's mistake resulted in her elimination. | 847,000 | #8 |
| 33/07-3 | Tuesday, 13 June 2017 | Second Chance Cook-Off - The previously eliminated contestants returned to compete for a place back in the competition. In a two-round cook-off, they could only choose one core ingredient from the given pantry to cook a first-round savoury dish and a second-round dessert. Jess, Samuel, Bryan, Tamara, Pete and Lee had the top savoury dishes and advanced to the next round. The top three in the second round were Bryan, Tamara and Jess. After her elimination in the previous episode, Tamara returned to the competition after producing the best dish. | 902,000 | #5 |
| 34/07-4 | Wednesday, 14 June 2017 | Pop-Up Restaurant Team Challenge - Season 8 runner-up Matt Sinclair mentored the two teams in running pop-up restaurants and making a four-course meal for 100 customers in three hours. Tamara, having an advantage after earning back her place in the competition, chose to spare Eloise from the challenge. The Red Team, led by Karlie, was assigned to cook dishes with meat, and the Blue Team, led by Ben, cooked seafood dishes. Both teams struggled early in the prep time: The Red Team fell behind in making their dishes due to a series of technical errors, while the Blue Team had issues in preparing their entrée and delayed their second main dish in preparing the noodles. Both teams' dishes showed technique and flavour but the Blue Team's delayed tuna dish with technical flaws and confusing apricot flavours of their dessert sent them to elimination. | 889,000 | #6 |
| 35/07-5 | Thursday, 15 June 2017 | Potluck Elimination Challenge - The six contestants on the Blue Team chose a covered bench of their choice with different ingredients and kitchen equipment, to make a dish without using the pantry. Ben received praise for the cooking of his Moreton Bay bug bisque. Tamara's use of the hibachi grill for her duck dish met with acclaim. Sam succeeded in cooking his lamb apart from his use of fruit. Michelle was applauded for her crepe dessert, which featured the apple used in three different ways. Ray tried to think of a dish using a fryer and an oven and he decided to cook a simple fish and chips dish, of which the judges were not impressed with its lack of originality. Despite being concerned about the rareness of his steak after having issues with his cooking time, Arum was commended on the quality of his dish. It was clear that Ray's dish did not match the competition and he was eliminated. | 824,000 | #5 |
Week 8 - Heston's Road Trip
| 36/08-1 | Sunday, 18 June 2017 | Murray River Mystery Box Challenge and Invention Test: Water - Heston Blumenthal took the Top 12 contestants on a road trip around Victoria for the week's challenges, which were inspired by the four classical elements. They arrived at Swan Hill on the Murray River for their first challenge, which was based on water, and had 75 minutes to make a dish with Heston's Mystery Box ingredients: corn, olives, oranges, Murray cod, currants, saltbush, oats and snails. Diana, Karlie and Sarah made the best dishes, with Diana gaining the advantage of extra time and mentoring by Heston in the second round. The least-performing contestants from the following challenges were sent to this week's elimination challenge. In the invention test, some contestants produced inventive dishes but Diana (whose elements in her dessert were disjointed), Tamara (whose technical dessert was too sweet) and Sarah (who served undercooked yabbies) struggled. Consequently, Diana and Sarah were the first two contestants to face elimination. | 737,000 | #7 |
| 37/08-2 | Monday, 19 June 2017 | Brim Silos Team Challenge: Earth - The remaining contestants arrived at the silo mill in Brim, Victoria for their second challenge, in which they were divided into pairs and given 75 minutes to make a main dish and dessert inspired by earth. The Purple Team (Karlie and Nicole) were first to be declared safe after impressing with their saltbush lamb dish and grapes and grains dessert. While the Blue Team's (Callan and Sam) dessert pleased the judges, their chocolate lamb dish was deemed the worst with undercooked meat and an unnecessary flavour combination. The elements conflicted in the main dish of the Yellow Team (Arum and Ben). However, their refined dessert was enough to save them and the Blue Team was sent to elimination. | 839,000 | #8 |
| 38/08-3 | Tuesday, 20 June 2017 | Mildura Salt Flats Team Challenge: Air - The contestants arrived at the salt pans of Mildura for their air element-based challenge. They were split into two teams and had to cook a three-course meal, including a salt-based dessert, for the guests and the judges. The progress of Eliza's Blue Team strive in the captain's poor leadership, composing a small underseasoned entrée. While Nicole's Red Team were fascinated with their entrée and main dishes, they struggled to cope their team member Michelle in making the dessert - their whipped chocolate ganache was too thick and lacked salt in the plate. Eventually, the Blue Team wins and were pronounced safe with their other course dishes. For the Red Team, their dessert failed to meet the brief and they were sent to elimination. | 913,000 | #5 |
| 39/08-4 | Wednesday, 21 June 2017 | Jack's Magazine Invention Test: Fire - Arum, Ben, Eliza and Eloise faced off in their last challenge inside Jack's Magazine from Maribyrnong. In the challenge, which was a two-round invention test, they had to cook savoury and sweet dishes using the element of fire as inspiration. Ben's dish was met with acclaim from the judges with Arum also declared safe, while Eliza and Eloise, both of whom had technical issues in their dishes, were sent to the second round, in which they had to make a dessert to avoid receiving the last spot in the elimination challenge. Eliza's Peach Ember dessert beat Eloise's Rhubarb Sorbet with Smoked Italian Meringue to join Ben and Arum in the Top 3. | 761,000 | #9 |
| 40/08-5 | Thursday, 22 June 2017 | Elimination Challenge: Deception - The contestants returned to the MasterChef kitchen after their four-day road trip for their elimination challenge. From series 6, the contestants had 75 minutes to cook a dish that focused on culinary deception. While she struggled with her caramel element, Eloise was safe after delivering the dish of the day. Ultimately, Sam and Nicole (both of their dishes had less deceptive creativity) were among the Bottom 3. Michelle, however, presented a frigid parfait when she used cream cheese as the base for the mixture while her coating was butyraceous and that sealed her elimination. | 790,000 | #5 |
| 40/08-5 | Thursday, 22 June 2017 | MasterClass: Heston Blumenthal, Gary Mehigan and Matt Preston - Heston presented dishes with different cooking methods of eggs. Gary made a Blue Eye Cod with Bacon and Mussels. Matt showcased his use of molecular gastronomy in making his ice cream bread and baked a self-saucing chocolate pudding. Lastly, Heston served a spit roasted barbecue lamb to the contestants. | 623,000 | #10 |
Week 9
| 41/09-1 | Sunday, 25 June 2017 | Peter Gilmore's Mystery Box Challenge and Invention Test - Peter Gilmore's choice of ingredients from his Mystery Box tasked the contestants with cooking a dish in 75 minutes. After winning the advantage for the invention test over Arum and Diana, Tamara was given the choice of picking one of Peter's three technical desserts, which were featured in previous pressure tests: his Guava and Custard Apple Snow Egg (from season 2), Eight Texture Chocolate Cake (from season 4) and Cherry Jam Lamington (from season 8). She chose his Cherry Jam Lamington, and the contestants had 60 minutes to make a dish inspired by the lamington. Eliza, Eloise and Sarah made the three best dishes and won the opportunity to cook for immunity. Callan, Arum and Nicole failed to recreate the flavour of the dish and were sent to the pressure test. | 709,000 | #7 |
| 42/09-2 | Monday, 26 June 2017 | Pressure Test: Paul Carmichael's "Bajan Fish Fry" - Arum, Callan and Nicole had three hours and forty five minutes to replicate guest chef Paul Carmichael's Bajan three-course meal, consisting of a fried snapper, charred pumpkin with salted cod, black pudding with cucumber and a spiced cucumber juice. None of them managed to complete all the elements in their dishes, particularly in their pumpkin. Arum's cooking of the fish damaged the presentation, but his dishes stood out in the tasting. After Callan struggled throughout the challenge and won praise for his fish, his accompanying dishes had too much spice and vinegar while his pumpkin was undercooked. However, it was Nicole's failure in deboning her fish which was the deciding factor in her elimination. | 871,000 | #9 |
| 43/09-3 | Tuesday, 27 June 2017 | Immunity Challenge: Ben Devlin - Eliza, Eloise and Sarah were given 60 minutes to cook a stuffed dish in the first round. The judges loved Sarah's chicken wings with mushroom filling and she competed in round two against chef Ben Devlin of the Paper Daisy restaurant. From a choice of similar paired ingredients, Sarah picked prawns and shrimp paste for her 75-minute cook. Both she and Ben received overall praise on their grilled prawn dishes but the professional won the challenge by one point over Sarah (28-27). | 894,000 | #5 |
| 44/09-4 | Wednesday, 28 June 2017 | Blind Pairing Team Challenge - The Top 10 were divided randomly in pairs for the team challenge. Through the use of communication, they had to cook two plates of the same dish while each member was separated by a divider. None of the teams’ dishes matched completely, but all won praise in the tasting. The split decision came down to the Green Team (Tamara and Sarah) and the Purple Team (Arum and Eliza) with the judges voting the Green Team as the winners. Ultimately, Eloise and Callan's overcooked scallops and Diana and Sam's misplaced praline sent them to elimination. | 904,000 | #5 |
| 45/09-5 | Thursday, 29 June 2017 | Time or Ingredients Elimination Challenge - Callan, Diana, Eloise and Sam competed in the time displacement elimination challenge from season 8, in which they had to gather their ingredients from one of the following four different hidden pantries on the prescribed time limit. Eloise, Sam and Callan had 60 minutes to cook with herbs, fruits and vegetables, while Diana waited for the last pantry (protein) with 30 minutes left to cook. Her risk paid off when her dish was praised by the judges, along with Eloise's ice cream dessert. The difficult decision was between Callan and Sam as their dishes did not impress. Callan took a risk with odd flavour combinations in his ice cream dessert, while Sam's execution let him down when his flawed elements impacted the presentation and taste of his dessert. As a result, he was eliminated from the competition. Tamara and Sarah flew business class for the Top 9 contestants’ trip to Japan after winning the team challenge. | 899,000 | #5 |
Week 10 - Japan Week
| 46/10-1 | Sunday, 2 July 2017 | Tokyo Eclectic Box Challenge and Invention Test - After arriving in Japan with the judges, the Top 9 contestants each bought one ingredient around Tokyo for the Mystery Box. Tamara chose scallops, Sarah selected lily root, Callan picked soya beans, Arum chose honey yams, Eloise selected cherry blossom radish, Karlie picked wagyu beef, Diana chose sesame dressing, Eliza selected miso Ben picked sake. After 60 minutes, the three best dishes were cooked by Karlie, Eloise and Diana, who was the winner for the Invention Test's advantage. She chose wasabi (over ginger and soy sauce). The contestants then had 60 minutes and an open pantry to cook their dishes. Beating Eliza and Sarah was Ben, whose Wasabi Ice Cream with Yam Fondants and Nutmeg Biscuit earned him a chance for immunity. | 780,000 | #8 |
| 47/10-2 | Monday, 3 July 2017 | Kodama Eight-course Degustation Challenge - The other contestants arrived at chef Tsutomu Kodama's Michelin-starred restaurant, where each had to cook a dish from a Japanese eight course degustation menu under George's mentorship, and the two contestants who made the best dishes joined Ben in the immunity challenge. Tamara had the first course of shiso with crab and yuzu. Eliza was assigned to cook white asparagus accompanied with a quail egg for course 2. Diana's assigned core ingredient for the third course were clams, producing a clam broth with spring onions and ginger floss. Mackerel was assigned for Eloise's fourth course dish, with cauliflower, tomato and wasabi. Karlie had course 5 with mushrooms in different ways. Arum's dish of marinated eye fillet with sake, broccoli and wasabi was course 6. Callan produced a dessert with matcha for course 7. Sarah was last with a savoury dessert of black sesame for the eighth course. All of their dishes (except Eloise's and Callan's, after struggling with the flavours) earned general acclaim from the judges and the customers. In the end, the dishes of Karlie and Sarah won overall praise from the judges and they joined Ben to compete for immunity. | 903,000 | #7 |
| 48/10-3 | Tuesday, 4 July 2017 | Mount Fuji Immunity Challenge - Ben, Karlie and Sarah arrived at the Obuchi Tea Plantation in the foothills of Mount Fuji for the two-round immunity challenge. In the first round, each had to make a dish with one of three Japanese fruits of their choice: fuji apple, shiranui and yuzu, to land two places in the second round. Karlie and Sarah had 60 minutes to make a dish featuring tea as the main ingredient. In the end, Sarah managed to claim the immunity pin after beating Karlie's Tea Poached Chicken Broth with her Tea Braised Pork Belly, Vegetables and Bean Curd. | 879,000 | #6 |
| 49/10-4 | Wednesday, 5 July 2017 | Shinjuku Food Stalls Team Challenge - The contestants arrived at the food stalls of Shinjuku, where they were divided into teams of three and had to make three Japanese street food dishes for 100 diners. The Yellow Team won the challenge and the prize of a private Masterclass. The Red Team's beef skewer lacked sauce, but otherwise, they were also safe. Although the judges applauded Blue Team member Sarah's prawn dish, her team members' other dishes had technical flaws, which sent them to elimination. | 840,000 | #6 |
| 50/10-5 | Thursday, 6 July 2017 | Akagi Shrine Elimination Challenge - Sarah decided to participate in the elimination challenge by not using her immunity pin. She, Callan and Tamara were taken to the Akagi Shrine, where they had 75 minutes to make a dish inspired by their personal past and future. Callan made a sushi-inspired dessert, Sarah made a pork "steamboat" dish, consisting of mushrooms, taro and wombok), and Tamara made pork dumplings with a spicy broth. In the end, both Tamara and Sarah had outstanding dishes and they were both safe, and Callan was eliminated when his dessert lacked flavour in its roasted rice ice cream. | 917,000 | #5 |
| 51/10-6 | Friday, 7 July 2017 | MasterClass: Takayuki Odaka, George Calombaris, Matt Preston and Kagehisa Imada - On the last day in Japan, the judges along with local Japanese chefs gave the contestants a MasterClass before the finals. Yesterday, Gary took the Yellow Team members to the Soba restaurant Kanda Matsuya for their private MasterClass with chef Takayuki Odaka who explained the history and demonstrated the making of Soba noodles. The next day, the Yellow Team rejoined their fellow contestants in the next MasterClasses at the Tateyama Castle. George made a modern Japanese seafood salad, Matt made three Japanese dessert slices and sushi chef Kagehisa Imada presented the basics of making sushi. | 422,000 | #14 |
Week 11
| 52/11-1 | Sunday, 9 July 2017 | Shannon Bennett's Mystery Box Challenge and Re-invention Test - Shannon's Mystery Box contained four special ingredients: Moreton bay bugs, porcini, Yukon gold potatoes and sunrise lime, for the contestants to cook a dish and in the 60-minute challenge, Eloise, Karlie and Arum delivered the top 3 dishes. Arum won the advantage which was to pick a random dish from the knife block to re-invent the core dish in 60 minutes. He chose Beef Wellington and he also got an extra 30 minutes to make his dish. Karlie used her Power Pin that she won in her previous invention test, with an extra 15 minutes to re-invent a dessert version of a wellington. But Tamara, Eliza and Arum received praise for their dishes and were named the Top 3. The challenge struggled Eloise, Diana and Ben which sent them to the pressure test. | 625,000 | #9 |
| 53/11-2 | Monday, 10 July 2017 | Pressure Test: Kylie Millar's "Nest" - Season 4 alumna Kylie Millar set up a challenging three-hour pressure test for Ben, Diana and Eloise, in which they had to recreate her elaborate 10-element dessert, "The Nest", with 15 minutes to plate it. Both Eloise and Ben struggled to make the honeycomb as well as plate the dish (the cured egg yolk in particular). In the tasting, Diana managed to interpret the dish. Eloise's panna cotta was grainy while both her honeycomb and parsnip bark were overcooked, which made her dish too bitter, and Ben's honeycomb was too chewy. Between the two of them in which their dishes did not score in presentation, the final decision came down to taste. As a result, the bitterness in Eloise's dish failed to match the flavour profile of the chef's dish and she was eliminated from the competition. | 753,000 | #8 |
| 54/11-3 | Tuesday, 11 July 2017 | Fast-Track to the Finals Immunity Challenge: Federico Zanellato - Before Finals Week, instead of winning an immunity pin in the second round, a Top 3 contestant from the invention test cooked against a guest chef to win an automatic pass to the Finals. In the first round, Arum, Eliza and Tamara had 45 minutes to make a soufflé to advance, and Arum won with his vanilla soufflé despite missing his prune puree. He competed against New South Wales' Chef of the Year Federico Zanellato and he had the advantage of choosing 10 ingredients of his choice from the available pantry of 20. Arum used strategy in cooking his seared beef with celeriac, apple, black pudding and pernod, which beat the simplicity of the professional chef's pasta dish, which won praise overall from the judges (26 points to Federico's 24). | 779,000 | #7 |
| 55/11-4 | Wednesday, 12 July 2017 | Six-Course Meal Service Challenge - The other contestants faced an individual three-hour service challenge on a commercial kitchen with three-starred Michelin chef Clare Smyth as their mentor. Each had the responsibility of cooking a dish of a six-course meal for 50 diners and the judges. Clare assigned a pair of ingredients for each contestant, which they had to highlight in their dish. By knife pull, Tamara (with marron and ras el hanout) and Eliza (mushrooms and spruce) were assigned to cook entrées, Diana (who had venison and pear) and Karlie (duck and Tasmanian mountain pepper) cooked the mains & Sarah (assigned with sheep's milk yoghurt and bergamot leaf) and Ben (pineapple and coriander seeds) were tasked with making the desserts. The best performers of the challenge joined Arum in the Finals. The time pressure was great for the contestants as they struggled to prep their dishes. Ben's performance in the kitchen resulted in him delivering the dish of the day and he advanced to the Finals. Tamara failed to highlight her second ingredient: ras el hanout while her couscous was undercooked which derailed the overall grade of her dish, Karlie's duck was cooked inconsistently and Sarah's savoury dessert was imbalanced with the use of roasted fennel. They were named the Bottom 3 as a result, but Eliza, who overpowered the spruce flavour in her dish with her Parmesan custard, had never been in any previous Elimination Challenges (including Pressure Tests) and therefore, she would face her first if Sarah decided to use her immunity pin. | 716,000 | #8 |
| 56/11-5 | Thursday, 13 July 2017 | Outdoor Food Memory Elimination Challenge - Eliza took Sarah's place in the elimination challenge after the latter decided to use her immunity pin. She, Karlie and Tamara had 75 minutes to cook a dish inspired by the memories of their respective vacation with their loved ones for the last two places in Finals Week. Karlie cooked Oysters with Oyster Cream, Cucumber Granita, Gin and Fennel which reflected in her beach living. Eliza's trip to Sorrento inspired her Beetroot and Gin Cured Trout with Horseradish Crème Fraiche, Fennel Crackers and Beetroot Butter. Tamara's contemplated her honeymoon in Paris with her Macaron Parfait Sandwiches with Strawberries. All of their dishes won praise with their creativity, flavour and technique from the judges, but unfortunately Eliza's choice of fish was slightly dry compared to the other two contestants’ dishes, which did not receive any flaws. In the end, her first (and only) Elimination Challenge sealed her fate despite being consistent throughout the competition. | 895,000 | #5 |
Week 12 - Finals Week
| 57/12-1 | Sunday, 16 July 2017 | Finals Mystery Box Challenge and Free Choice Invention Test - The Top 6 finalists had to use all of the ingredients in their Mystery Box to make a dish in the 60-minute challenge. All of the finalists chose to make a dessert with these ingredients and three of them (Karlie, Ben and Tamara) stood out in the judging. It was Ben's unique ice cream dessert that won him the Invention Test's advantage. The advantage gave him the ability to choose any ingredient of his choice from the pantry to be a main feature in his dish. Relying on strategy, Ben chose liquorice, a choice that threw most of the contestants off. Karlie and Sarah struggled the most, and landed in the pressure test. Ben's advantage almost backfired when his liquorice ice cream's texture was deemed too soft, but, in a close decision, he was declared safe along with Tamara and Arum, as Diana's overly bouncy panna cotta sent her to join Sarah and Karlie in the pressure test. | 806,000 | #6 |
| 58/12-2 | Monday, 17 July 2017 | Pressure Test: Shaun Quade's "Pearl on the Ocean Floor" - Diana, Karlie and Sarah, three of the most consistent cooks in the competition, went head to head in the pressure test. They were given three and a half hours to recreate “Pearl on the Ocean Floor” – one of the most intriguing signature dishes of the Lûmé restaurant by chef Shaun Quade. The dish was composed of various seafood and lemon marmalade concealed with flavoured sand, mussel foam and a miso pine nut ice cream encased in a small sugar pearl and chocolate. Karlie excelled in her first pressure test and was the only contestant to successfully recreate all the elements of the dish. But while both Sarah and Diana's dish had a missing element, Sarah's ice cream was deemed pale and bland. Despite being a top favorite to win the competition, Sarah was eliminated in her first pressure test, leaving Diana and Karlie to join the Top 5. | 853,000 | #7 |
| 59/12-3 | Tuesday, 18 July 2017 | World Class Service Elimination Challenge - The Top 5 competed in their places for the Top 4 in the Surprise Elimination Challenge. They each had to cook a dish of a five-course meal (3 savoury and 2 desserts) in two hours of service to impress the judges, Shannon, returning chef Peter Gilmore and other popular chefs: Ross Lusted and Alla Wolf-Tasker. Diana, Arum and Karlie were assigned to mains while Ben and Tamara did desserts. In judging, Diana's Charred Squid with Peas, Mint and Cucumber and Tamara's Chocolate Mousse with Orange and Fennel delivered the dishes of the day with Karlie also declared safe with her Pork Loin with Mushrooms and Blueberries. Arum and Ben were the last two remaining. While Ben's lavender ice cream impressed the judges, his shortbread was undercooked but the fact that Arum cooked his duck (the main element) early before service hinted his meat becoming dry, which meant he was eliminated. | 828,000 | #7 |
| 60/12-4 | Wednesday, 19 July 2017 | Dinner by Heston Service Challenge - Ashley Palmer-Watts instructed the Top 4 finalists to recreate four signature dishes of the menu of the restaurant Dinner by Heston in Melbourne for 40 diners in 5 hours. Karlie got the Frumenty octopus dish, Tamara recreated the Roast Groper and Green Sauce but she discarded the onion element when she ran out of time to make it and her dish was imbalanced. Diana's Beef Royale received rave reviews, but she cut the sirloin incorrectly. Ben was tasked with replicating the complex 105-step Lamington Cake. After being affected and struggled with the recipe, he took control to produce the best replication of the dish which impressed the judges overall and Ben advanced to the semifinals. | 955,000 | #5 |
| 61/12-5 | Thursday, 20 July 2017 | Freestyle Elimination Challenge - Diana, Karlie and Tamara were given the option of designing the concept of their own innovative dish with any cuisine and ingredients. After 75 minutes, the two contestants with the best dishes secured the last two places and joined Ben in the semifinals. In the tasting, Diana's Thai Broth with Crayfish and Karlie's Spicy XO Pork Belly with Rice Cakes were met with high acclaim. Both of them were declared safe and advanced while Tamara, despite winning praise for her flavours, served underbaked brownies to the judges. She was eliminated from the competition for the second time. | 980,000 | #4 |
| 61/12-5 | Thursday, 20 July 2017 | MasterClass: Chefs vs. Contestants - In the last MasterClass of the season, the semifinalists and Matt set a Mystery Box Challenge with their chosen ingredients for Gary, George and Shannon to cook a dish in 60 minutes. The winning dish was Gary's roti with pepper and tea pork. Curtis Stone returns to join George and Gary to pit against Ben, Diana and Karlie to cook a dish featuring coral perch in a team relay challenge in 60 minutes. In a split decision verdict, the finalists were declared the winners with their Steamed Coral Perch with Spiced Tamarind. | 841,000 | #6 |
Grand Finale Week
| 62/13-1 | Sunday, 23 July 2017 | Semi-Finals: Service Challenge - The semifinalists competed in a four-hour service challenge, in which they had to cook one main dish and a dessert for 25 diners and the judges. Diana's dishes of Wagyu with Mushrooms and Lemon Verbena with Whey Caramel met with overall acclaim in its complexity. Despite struggling in the challenge to prep his dishes, Ben also won praise with his main: Cinder Fillet, Tulip Bulbs, Port Jus and Greens and dessert: Pumpkin Galette with Dutch Spices, Cream Cheese Mousse and Vanilla Bay Leaf Ice Cream for his bold flavours. Karlie also struggled throughout in prepping her dishes and, despite the fact that the judges applauded her main dish of Crayfish with Ginger Broth, they noted the pieces of pith and the bitterness involved in her mandarin syrup for her black sesame ice cream. Her dessert didn't match her sophisticated main dish and she was eliminated, leaving Diana and Ben to compete in the Grand Finals. | 953,000 | #5 |
| 63/13-2 | Monday, 24 July 2017 | Grand Finale - The finale took place over three rounds: In the first round, the finalists had 60 minutes to make a dish using at least one ingredient from a selection of every mystery box they had, from which Ben picked Elena's mystery box and Diana picked Peter Gilmore's mystery box. Ben accidentally cut his hand with a knife and lost time. However, his Lemon Myrtle Ice Cream with Macadamia Shortbread impressed regardless, receiving 26 points out of 30. But Diana wowed the judges with her Abalone with Chinese Broccoli, Mushroom and Green Juice, receiving a perfect score of 30 points. In the second round, there were no rules, and Ben and Diana had 75 minutes to cook three identical dishes for the judges. Ben's Cardamom Coffee Ice Cream with Butternut Three-ways and a Dutch Spice Biscuit impressed the judges with his creativity of his ice cream and received 28 points, while Diana's Malaysian Oatmeal Prawns with Vegetables in a Creamy Sauce also impressed the judges and received 27 points. Diana kept her lead with a total score of 57 while Ben had a total of 54 points. In the last round, Ben and Diana faced the longest pressure test yet, in which they had six hours to recreate Kirsten Tibballs' Trio of Fruits dessert, consisting of chocolate disguised as an apple, pear and mandarin. Both Ben and Diana struggled with the final task, failing to make the sugar-crusted liquor center for the apple, which came out like a jelly rather than a liquid. In the tasting, Diana's dessert received praise in flavour, but the chocolate in her mandarin was thick and lacking in mandarin flavour. Ben had a better replication, despite accidentally covering his pear with too much tempered chocolate. Diana scored 33 points (8 points each from all the judges, except Matt, who gave 9 points), tallying to the overall score of 90 points. Ben scored 35 points (9 each from all of the judges except Gary who gave 8 points), finalizing his score at 89 points. By one point, Diana was declared Australia's ninth MasterChef champion. | 1,120,000 | #3 |
| 63/13-2 | Monday, 24 July 2017 | Winner Announced - Diana Chan won the title of MasterChef 2017, the grand prize of $250,000 and a monthly column in the magazine Delicious while Ben Ungermann, as runner-up, received $40,000. Karlie Verkerk, who finished in third-place, received a cash prize of $10,000. | 1,303,000 | #2 |
