= Kirsten Tibballs =

Australian pastry chef and chocolatier

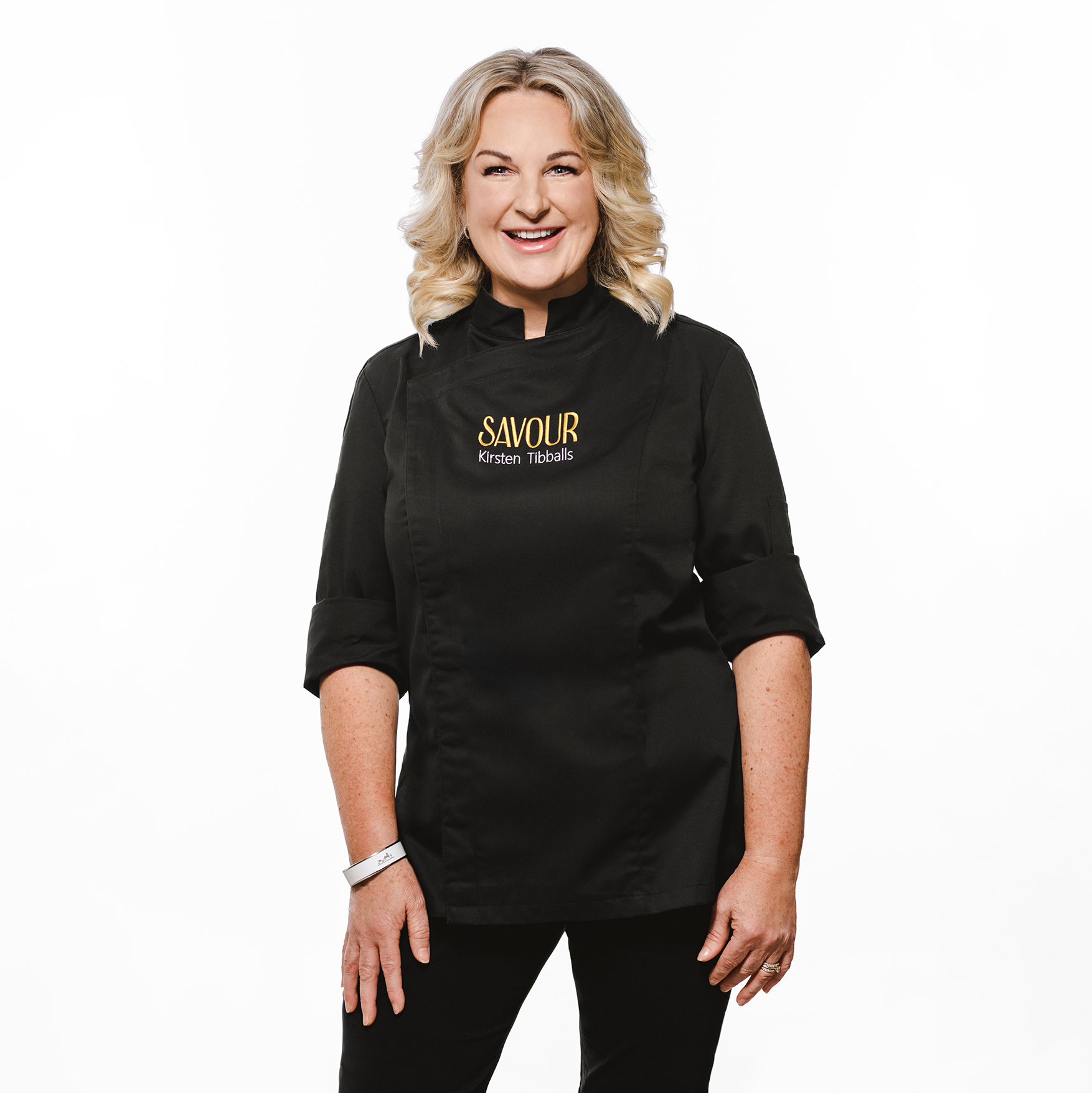
- Kirsten Tibballs
- Born: Leongatha, Victoria, Australia
- Occupations: Pastry chef; chocolatier
- Spouse: Michael Louros
- Children: 1

Kirsten Tibballs is an Australian pastry chef and chocolatier.

In 2004, Tibballs represented Australia at the World Pastry Team Championships in Las Vegas, USA, winning 1st in the Individual Chocolates category, and won a gold medal in the Live Patisserie Competition at the Pastry Olympics in Germany. Tibballs has also served as the Head of Jury for Taste at the 2022 World Chocolate Masters held in Paris.

In recognition of her contributions to gastronomy, pastry and the culinary relationship between France and Australia, Kirsten was appointed a Knight (Chevalier) of the Ordre du Mérite Agricole (Order of Agricultural Merit) by the French Ministry of Agriculture.

In 2002, Tibballs founded Savour Chocolate and Patisserie School in Brunswick, Melbourne. Tibballs is the author of three cookbooks and a regular contributor to pastry publications. In addition to hosting her own television show, The Chocolate Queen, she has featured on several television programs, including MasterChef Australia.

As one of the female pastry chefs on Instagram, Tibballs is regularly referred to as the ‘Queen of Chocolate’ due to her contributions to the chocolate industry.

== Career ==
Tibballs is an ambassador for Bulla Family Dairy and the sole global ambassador for Belgian chocolate brand Callebaut.

=== Savour Chocolate and Patisserie School ===
In 2002, Tibballs founded Savour Chocolate and Patisserie School. Tibballs cited the local Australian market as "lagging" compared to the European market and so wanted to open an institution that offered the resources for Australian pastry chefs who could not afford to travel to Europe. As the owner and director of Savour Chocolate & Patisserie School, Tibballs runs the business. The school teaches a variety of classes on chocolate and patisserie.

In 2013, Kirsten Tibballs expanded the Savour Chocolate and Patisserie School by launching an online platform featuring video tutorials designed for a global audience. By 2024, the Savour platform hosts a comprehensive library of over 550 online classes.

Savour Chocolate and Patisserie School has hosted numerous guest chefs who have conducted both hands-on and online classes.

=== The Chocolate Queen Television Show ===
The Chocolate Queen, a show aimed at home bakers, features accessible recipes along with innovative chocolate tips and techniques. The series, hosted by Kirsten Tibballs, premiered in 2018 and was broadcast both in Australia and internationally. Its success led to six additional seasons and the show was broadcast across 89 countries.

=== Collaborations ===
In 2023, Kirsten Tibballs partnered with Bulla Family Dairy to launch a Murray Street Ice Creamery range, inspired by her signature desserts.

=== Demonstrations ===
Tibballs travels across Australia, showcasing her chocolate and patisserie skills through live demonstrations at industry events such as The Good Food & Wine Shows and the Cake Bake & Sweet Shows.

=== Cookbooks ===
Kirsten Tibballs has authored three cookbooks. In 2012, she self-published Chocolate to Savour, which won the Best Photography Cookbook of 2012 award from Gourmand in the UK. In 2016, Tibballs released her second cookbook, Chocolate. In 2023, her third book, Chocolate All Day, was published.

== Television appearances ==
In addition to her own television show, The Chocolate Queen, Kirsten has made a variety of guest appearances on other programs.

Tibballs has appeared on MasterChef Australia numerous times including the Series 9 season finale where she presented her 'Trio of Fruits.

Tibballs has appeared several times on Everyday Gourmet with Justine Schofield, a Foxtel Lifestyle product hosted by Justine Schofield, a contestant from MasterChef Australia’s first season.

Tibballs' cooking program, The Chocolate Queen, has aired 5 seasons across Foxtel and SBS Food in Australia.

In 2023, Tibballs participated as a contestant alongside other esteemed pastry chefs and dessert creators in the inaugural season of Dessert Masters, a MasterChef spinoff.

MasterChef Australia Appearances:
Year	Series	Original Airdate	Week	Episode Event
2013	MasterChef Australia series 5	29 July 2013	9	Pressure Test 3 Kirsten Tibballs: The Louros Cake
2013	MasterChef Australia series 5	1 August 2013	9	MasterClass 9
2015	MasterChef Australia series 7	24 June 2015	8	Team Challenge: Afternoon Tea at The Hotel Windsor
2017	MasterChef Australia series 9	21 May 2017	4 (Sweet Week)	Mystery Box Challenge: Kirsten Tibballs' Mystery Box Challenge and Flower Affinity Invention Test
2017	MasterChef Australia series 9	24 July 2017	Finals week	Grand Finale Challenge: Kirsten Tibballs' Trio of Fruits dessert
2018	MasterChef Australia series 10	28 June 2018	8 (Sweet Week)	Elimination Challenge: Chocolate Wheel Elimination Challenge
2019	MasterChef Australia series 11	1 July 2019	10	Pressure Test: Kirsten Tibballs' Apple Pie
2020	MasterChef Australia series 12	26 May 2020	7 (Best Dish Week)	Immunity Challenge: Immunity Pressure Test: Kirsten Tibballs' "Meljito"
2020	MasterChef Australia series 12	12 July 2020	13	Elimination Challenge: All-In Elimination: Four-Course Service
2021	MasterChef Australia series 13	11 May 2021	4 (Master's Week)	Pressure Test: Kirsten Tibballs' Three Chocolate Desserts
2022	MasterChef Australia series 14	28 June 2022	11	Pressure Test: Kirsten Tibballs Pressure Test
2023	MasterChef Australia series 15	2 July 2023	9	Elimination Challenge: Kirsten Tibballs Dessert Elimination Challenge
2025	MasterChef Australia series 17	6 May 2025	2 (Legend's Week)	Pressure Test: Kirsten Tibballs' Coffee Caviar Tin

== Competitions and awards ==
- 1st in the Individual Chocolates category, 2004 World Pastry Team Championships, Las Vegas, USA
- Gold medal, Live Patisserie Competition, 2004 Pastry Olympics, Germany
- Tibballs served as the Head of the Jury for Taste at the 2022 World Chocolate Masters held in Paris
- Appointed a Knight (Chevalier) of the Ordre du Mérite Agricole (Order of Agricultural Merit) by the French Ministry of Agriculture.

== Personal life ==
Tibballs is married to her husband Michael and has a son, Charlie. Kirsten has 2 siblings, her sister Fiona and brother Brenton.

== Bibliography ==
- Tibballs, Kirsten (2012). Chocolate to Savour; delicious chocolate recipes. [United Kingdom]: KLT Consulting. ISBN 9781908202130.
- Tibballs, Kirsten (2016). Chocolate: Luscious recipes and expert know-how for biscuits, cakes, sweet treats and desserts. Murdoch Books. ISBN 9781743366134.
- Tibballs, Kirsten (2023). Chocolate All Day. Murdoch Books. ISBN 9781761501487.
