= Josimar Melo =

Josimar Melo (born 1954 in Recife, Brazil), is a food & wine journalist for the major Brazilian daily newspaper, Folha de S.Paulo.

He owns and directs the gastronomic website Basilico and contributes to several publications in Brazil and abroad. A former student of Architecture in University of São Paulo, he teaches History of Gastronomy at Anhembi Morumbi University, also in São Paulo. In 1995 he created the main gastronomic event in Brazil at the time, “Boa Mesa”, which was sold in 2000.

He is the president of the South American jury for the World's 50 Best Restaurants, chosen annually by Restaurant Magazine.

Among his books are Guia Josimar Melo (first published in 1992; a comprehensive gourmet guide of São Paulo, yearly updated ); A Cerveja ("The Beer"); and Berinjela se Escreve com J (a lexicon for the correct spelling of around 10,000 gastronomy-related words in several idioms).
