= Alla Wolf-Tasker =

Australian chef and hotelier

Alla Wolf-Tasker AM
- Wolf-Tasker in 2014 with the Brazilian journalist Josimar Melo
- Born: Austria
- Education: The University of Melbourne
- Culinary career
- Current restaurant
- The Lake House

Alla Wolf-Tasker is an Australian chef and hotelier, who has run the Lake House restaurant and complex in Daylesford, Victoria, since 1984.

== Early life and pre-Lake House career ==
Alla Wolf-Tasker was born an only child in Austria in the period after World War II. Her parents, Katherine and Anatoli, were Russian emigrants who had spent the final portion of the war interred in German labour camps. By the time of Wolf-Tasker's birth, they were residing in a displaced persons camp.

The Wolf-Tasker family emigrated to Australia while Alla was a baby; Anatoli travelling to Sydney for work at a tannery, and Katherine and Alla to a migrant camp in regional Victoria. The family later moved to Melbourne, Victoria, where they resided in suburban housing commissions in the city's west. After a time, the family purchased a country house, or dacha, in Daylesford, a town in rural Victoria, paying £500 (the currency of Australia before 1966). This dacha was frequented by friends of Wolf-Tasker's parents, who were particularly attracted by the mineral springs. All of them were Eastern Europeans. Between them, they traded goods they had produced, such as cheese, smoked eels, and pickles. Anatoli had a still, which he used to make vodka.

Wolf-Tasker attended tertiary education at the University of Melbourne. She had been raised to speak English and Russian fluently, and at university she studied the language along with maths and psychology. In the early 1970s, she travelled to France to pursue a career as a chef. She found work at Moulin de Mougins, working under Roger Vergé, where she describes an experience with a tomato dish as revelatory: "It was Provence." She later cited this as a turning point in her career aspirations, endeavouring to create her own farmhouse restaurant like Vergé's.

After her time in Europe, Wolf-Tasker returned to Melbourne, where she began working as a cook at the St Kilda Alternative School, simultaneously running a catering business and cooking school. At the St Kilda Alternative School, she met Allan, an artist who had studied printmaking and sculpture at RMIT University. The two began dating, and in 1979 they married. Together, Alla and Allan purchased a treeless field in Daylesford, strewn with shrubbery and debris, in view of her parent's country house. They cleared it over the following four years. Wolf-Tasker planted trees such on the site, such as stringybarks. Her mother planted silver birch. In 1980 or 1981, Wolf-Tasker gave birth to her daughter Larissa.

== The Lake House ==
Interior in 2006

In 1984 opened a restaurant there called the Lake House. For its first few years, the Lake House hosted 25 seats and opened Friday to Sunday. The couple kept their jobs in Melbourne, purchasing supplies in bulk on Friday before making the 100 km (62 mi) trip to Daylesford, where Wolf-Tasker began preparing food. In a 2024 interview, Wolf-Tasker stated that the restaurant's early clientele were perplexed the dishes being served, which included duck liver parfait, unexpected in an area that specialized most in industrial potato production. She describes the Lake House as "financially unviable" for its first seven years.

In the following years, Wolf-Tasker began the Daylesford Macedon Produce organisation, which connected farmers and local suppliers. This was the first of its type in Australia. The Wolf-Tasker's daughter, Larissa, began work with the Lake House, working as interior decorator for the business. As of 2018, Larissa worked as brand manager for the business.

To coincide with the Lake House's 30th anniversary, Wolf-Tasker released a self published book titled Three Decades On: Lake House and Daylesford, including recipes, profiles with suppliers, and a large number of photographs. By this time, in 2018, Wolf-Tasker was no longer running dinner service, although she continued to exercise creative control over the menu, developing dishes at home before bringing them for workshopping with the Lake House's kitchen team.

Allan died in 2022 to cancer. He had managed the business with Alla for 38 years. As of 2024, Wolf-Tasker had developed ovarian cancer, while continuing work at the Lake House. Her daughter, Larissa, worked with her, as did her son in law Rob, who served as the establishment's food and drink manager.

Dishes served at the Lake House

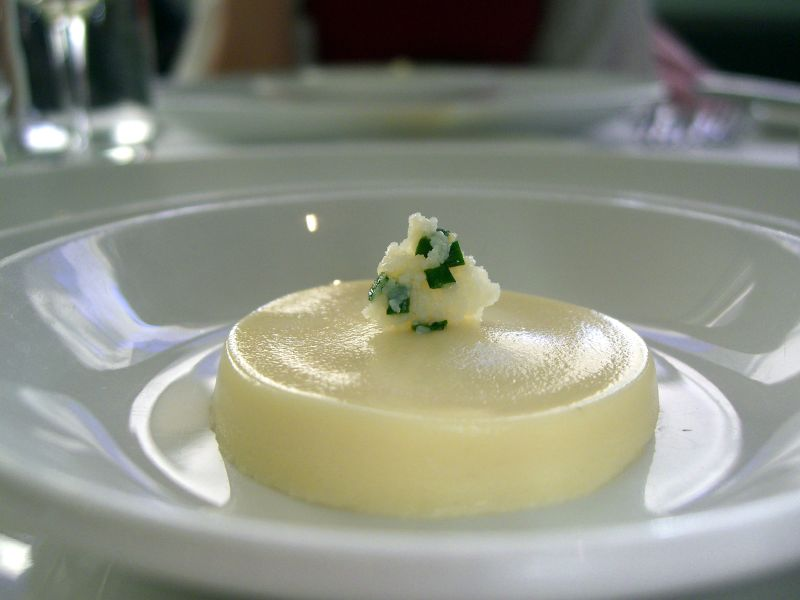

== Food philosophy ==
Wolf-Tasker is particularly interested in food localism. She has spoken out against what she sees as chefs cooking according to trends—"the US-inspired deep-fried everything, Korean barbecues, food trucks, ancient ingredients reclaimed, and the rest of the Gosh! F--- yeah! brigade"—asking "What happened to finding your culinary voice and perfecting, perfecting, perfecting?"
