= Janice Wong =

Singaporean pastry chef (born 1983)

- 黃慧嫻
- Born: 1983 (age 42–43); Singapore
- Education: National University of Singapore
- Occupations: Chef, Artist
- Years active: 2006 - present
- Known for: Edible Art, Contemporary Pastry
- Awards: Asia’s Best Pastry Chef Award (2013, 2014), World Gourmet Summit Pastry Chef of the Year (2011, 2013, 2015)
- Website: https://www.janicewong.com.sg/

Janice Wong (born 1983) is a Singaporean artist, chocolatier, chef, and entrepreneur. In addition to restaurants, dessert bars, and retail ventures, she is known for her edible art installations. She has won multiple awards, including being named "Asia’s Best Pastry Chef" two years in a row by the World’s 50 Best Restaurants award sponsored by S.Pellegrino. Her single-origin, bean-to-bar chocolate brand, Janice Wong Pure Imagination, has retail outlets and production facilities in Singapore.

== Early life and education ==
Wong studied economics at National University of Singapore and graduated in 2006. Later that year, she enrolled in Le Cordon Bleu in Paris, where she graduated with a pastry diploma. Following graduation, she worked as a pastry trainee at upscale French restaurant Les Amis in Singapore, then under Will Goldfarb at Room 4 Dessert in Manhattan’s Nolita neighborhood.

She has worked with a number of notable chefs, including Spain’s Juan Mari Arzak, Americans Thomas Keller and Grant Achatz, and French pastry chef Pierre Hermé. Wong cites Achatz and renowned Catalonian pastry chef Oriol Balaguer as influences on her work.

== Career ==
The idea of opening a restaurant first came to Wong in 2004, while on an academic exchange program at Monash University in Melbourne, Australia. Three years later, Wong established her first business, 2am:dessert bar, in Singapore’s Holland Village in 2007. The 70-seat open-concept establishment was based on the idea of inviting guests into her home, cooking in front of them, and staying late into the night. Four years later, in 2011, she opened 2am:lab, a 2,000-square-foot culinary research and development lab in Singapore, for hosting guest chefs and workshops.

In December 2014, Wong launched her eponymous brand Janice Wong Singapore with pop-up shops in Singapore’s Gardens by the Bay, ION Orchard, and Marina Bay Sands. The shop specializes in dessert chocolate that it describes as "interactive, edible art".

Wong opened a pop-up dessert bar in Melbourne, and entered the Japanese market with a 2am:dessertbar Tokyo location. The restaurant launched with a seasonal, localized menu taking inspiration from local prefectures.

In January 2018, she opened Janice Wong MGM, a high-end shop in Macau’s MGM Cotai. The shop had a retail section, traditional bakery, and counters for sweets and gelato. In addition to a dining area, it boasted a chocolate fountain over seven meters tall with streams of dark, milk, and white chocolate.

=== Fair Trade and Sustainability ===
Wong’s most recent business venture is Pure Imagination, a single-origin, bean-to-bar concept chocolate brand focused on cocoa purity, fair trade, and sustainability. The company works directly with smallholder farmers in Colombia, Ecuador, Peru, Philippines, and Thailand to produce small-batch chocolate bars.

Its first location opened in Singapore’s Great World shopping center, complete with a small-batch chocolate factory in full view to the public, and workshops that take people through the chocolate-making process.

With the long-term goal of producing Singapore’s first single-origin chocolate, Wong is on a mission to plant 1,000 cacao trees on the island.

=== Publishing, television, and other appearances ===
In 2015, Wong appeared on an episode of MasterChef Australia season 7, where she challenged contestants to recreate her intricate dessert—the cassis plum. She was also a guest judge alongside Padma Lakshmi, Tom Colicchio, Gail Simmons, and Nilou Motamed for the season 17 finale of Top Chef in 2020.

Wong self-published a cookbook in 2011 titled Perfection in Imperfection and co-authored a second cookbook in 2013 titled Dim Sum. She has written two citrus cookbooks, one on Kochi yuzu in 2012, and A Taste of Kochi Citrus in 2018, published by the Kochi Representative Office in Singapore. Both books explore the variety of citrus in certain prefectures of Japan.

Wong also speaks internationally on her culinary philosophy, which she also uses in part to represent Singapore. In 2018, she was selected for the Culture Communication Forum in Seoul, Korea, as an ambassador to represent Singapore’s arts and culture.

Every year Wong has showcased about 40 edible art exhibitions for public and private events, including for high-end brands in fashion, automotive, and skincare, such as Bally, Prada, Ferrari, Audi, Hermes, Olay, and L’Occitane. In 2016, she was featured at the Singapore Art Museum “Imaginarium”, which was a massive sugar coral installation. In 2018, she worked with Huis Ten Bosch in Nagasaki, Japan featuring the best of her works over two stories in the palace.

== Awards ==
- Pastry Chef of the Year, World Gourmet Summit Awards, 2011
- Young Woman Achiever, Her World, 2011/12
- World Gourmet Summit Awards, Pastry Chef of the Year, 2013
- World Gourmet Summit Awards, Pastry Chef of the Year, 2015
- SG Magazine Readers Choice Awards, Best Dessert Spot, 2012
- SG Magazine Readers Choice Awards, Best Dessert Spot, 2013
- SG Magazine Readers Choice Awards, Best Dessert Spot, 2014
- World's 50 Best Restaurants: Asia, Asia’s Best Pastry Chef, 2013
- World's 50 Best Restaurants: Asia, Asia’s Best Pastry Chef, 2014

== Books ==
- Wong, Janice. Perfection In Imperfection. Gatehouse Publishing, 2011. ISBN 978-9810895518
- Kochi Yuzu, (2012)
- Wong, Janice and Ma Jian Jun. Dim Sum: A Flour-forward approach to Traditional Favorites and Contemporary Creations. Gatehouse Publishing, 2013. ISBN 978-9810778705
- A Taste of Kochi Citrus, (2018)
