= Diana Chan =

Malaysian-born Australian cook

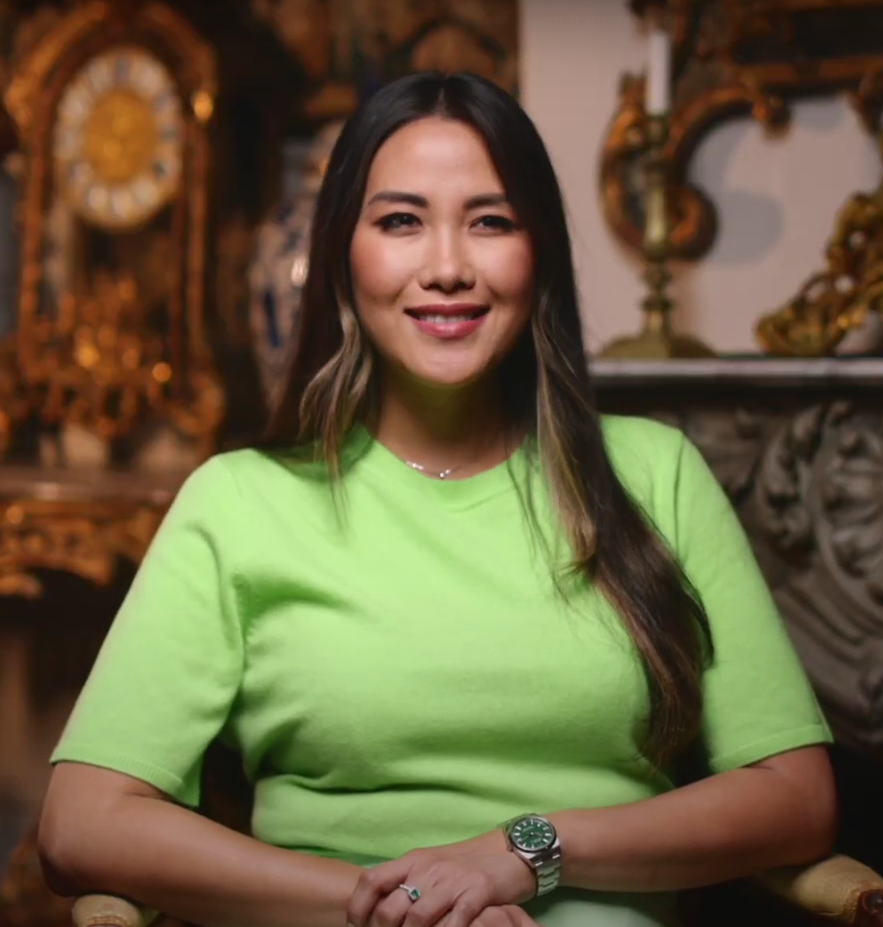
- Chan in 2023
- Born: 1987–1988; Setiawan, Perak, Malaysia
- Education: Deakin University
- Occupations: Celebrity cook, television personality
- Awards: Winner of MasterChef Australia 2017
- Diana Chan's voice Recorded March 2023
- Website: dianachan.co

Diana Chan (born 1987 or 1988) is a Malaysian-born Australian cook. In 2017, she won MasterChef Australia series 9, defeating the runner-up Ben Ungermann by one point in the final. After her win, she left her job in accounting to work with food, including as a brand ambassador, a cooking show host and a cookbook author.

== Early life ==
Chan was born in 1987 or 1988 in Setiawan in the state of Perak, Malaysia as the youngest of three children. The family soon moved from their guava farm home to Johor Bahru, where she attended Convent Johor Bahru. Chan learned to cook by watching her parents prepare Peranakan and Cantonese food. At age 17, Chan moved to Kuala Lumpur to complete her Cambridge A levels. Upon matriculating a year later, she moved to Melbourne, Australia, where she completed a Bachelor of Commerce degree at Deakin University in 2010.

== Career ==
After qualifying as a chartered accountant, Chan worked for Deloitte as a senior analyst.

=== MasterChef Australia ===
Chan competed in the ninth series of MasterChef Australia, which filmed from November 2016 to late May 2017. She approached the competition calmy and methodically, performing well in mystery box challenges to the point of winning one, and was praised for her innovation. Chan captained her team to win the first team challenge of the year.

On 24 July 2017, the finale aired. Chan won, beating runner-up Ben Ungermann by one point. Her prize was $250,000 and a column in delicious. magazine; she said she intended to use the money to open a casual, Malaysian-influenced restaurant. The pressure of competing in the final left her sick for a week. To get time off work to compete, Chan had taken unpaid leave; by the time she won, she had run her savings down and had to return to work immediately. She kept working as an accountant for the next few months until the results were announced.

=== After Masterchef ===
Chan has spent her time since Masterchef working with brands in Australia and Asia, including Kewood and St. Regis Hotels. She designed the in-flight menu for Malaysia Airlines, acting as their ambassador. She has also worked on tourism across Asia. A collaboration with the dumpling brand Golden Wok on a frozen dumpling product line has been very successful: sold in supermarkets through Australia, A$10,000,000 sales were generated in 2020, making it the best selling product in its category in the country. As of 2023 the company was beginning to sell the dumplings in Asia.

For eight months in 2018, Chan ran Chanteen, a pop-up restaurant in Melbourne. In 2024, she released The Golden Wok, a cookbook covering wok-cooked Malaysian dishes.

A tv show hosted by Chan, Asia Unplated with Diana Chan, was released on SBS on 19 December 2019. The show saw her cooking with friends, including fellow Masterchef contestant Khanh Ong, and was commissioned among several food shows on SBS. Production was the outcome of six months of Chan petitioning for funding and organizing. The show was renewed for a second season, which was released in 2021. This contained ten episodes, filmed in Melbourne under strict movement restrictions during the COVID-19 pandemic. Guests included a returning Ong, and other former Masterchef contestants Sarah Todd and Karlie Verkerk.
