= EFM Records =

American independent record label

- Founded: 2008
- Founder: Dito Godwin
- Distributor(s): Universal Music Group
- Genre: Various
- Country of origin: U.S.
- Location: Hollywood, California

EFM Records is an American independent record label and corporation founded in 2008 by renowned music producer Dito Godwin . It was established to be an artist-friendly label and therefore, its primary focus is to provide opportunities for artists who prefer to have more individual control over their art, as well as development projects hand-picked by Godwin.

== History ==
=== 2008 - 2010 ===
EFM Records was founded in 2008 by Dito Godwin and a group of corporate investors with the primary goal of being an artist-friendly label focused on modern technology and distribution while still supporting more traditional methods such as radio and retail.

In late 2008, EFM Records signed former Interscope recording artist and lead singer/guitarist of Pseudopod (band) Kevin Carlberg, and in early 2009, they brought on three more artists, including Kathryn Gallagher (daughter of actor Peter Gallagher), Mike Stone (guitarist of heavy metal band Queensrÿche), and Carlton Pride (son of Country Music Hall of Fame's Charlie Pride).

By mid-2009, EFM Records had partnered with Mi5 Recordings, which facilitated major North American distribution with EMI Music Group and Caroline Distribution. However, in early 2010, EFM parted ways with EMI and Mi5 and signed a deal with Bungalo and Universal Music Group.

In 2010, the label signed Rolan Bolan (son of Mark Bolan), the punk band Hear Kitty Kitty, and the alternative modern punk band The Stick People.

As of 2009, the label had showcased digital works from all its artists but had yet to release a single or a full-length CD, stating that they would be released in 2010.

After the death of Kevin Carlberg, Godwin worked with Rolan Bolan on recording "Missing Me", written by Kevin Carlberg, and assisted in the video production.

In July 2010, EFM confirmed a dual release date of August 17 for two artists, "Hear Kitty Kitty" and "The Stick People," through Universal Music Group.

=== 2011 - present ===
EFM released The Stick People in digital form on July 19, 2011.

The same year, Jani Lane (best known as the lead singer of Warrant), died on August 11, 2011.

President and CEO of EFM Records, Dito Godwin stated, "I've been working with Jani Lane over the last few months putting songs together in an effort to supply some of my clients with his incredible songs as well as putting a record together for him to possibly release on my label. His passing has shocked and saddened me to the point of tears. A great person whose talent was far greater than most people will ever know. I produced a number of songs for his solo project in the late '90s. My connection with Jani as an artist and producer was textbook perfect. Upon completion of those sessions, we both said it was a mind-blowing experience to work together and we would do it again, and we did. The world will truly miss Jani Lane. I'm so lucky to have been a small part of his life. RIP Jani. I'm numb".

== Current artists ==
| Artist | Genre | Notes |
|---|---|---|
| The Stick People | Post-punk, rock, alternative rock | |
| Hear Kitty Kitty | Post-punk, rock, alternative rock | |
| Carlton Pride | Reggae | Son of Country music Hall of Famer Charlie Pride |
| Stephyn Duffy | Post-punk, rock, EDM | |
| Mike Stone (musician) | Rock, heavy metal, progressive rock, jazz | Former Queensrÿche guitarist |
| Rolan Bolan | Rock | Son of Marc Bolan |

== Past artists ==
- Kevin Carlberg, Former Interscope recording artist and lead singer/guitarist of Pseudopod, Pop/Rock
- Kathryn Gallagher, Daughter of Peter Gallagher, Pop/Rock
