= MasterChef Australia series 6 =

MasterChef Australia
- Season 6
- Judges: Matt Preston; George Calombaris; Gary Mehigan
- No. of contestants: 24
- Winner: Brent Owens
- Runner-up: Laura Cassai
- No. of episodes: 60

Release
- Original network: Network Ten
- Original release: 5 May – 28 July 2014

Series chronology
- ← Previous; Series 5 Next → Series 7

The sixth series of the Australian cooking game show MasterChef Australia premiered on Monday, 5 May 2014 on Network Ten.

This series was won by Brent Owens in the final against Laura Cassai on 28 July 2014. Owens remained the last male winner until Sashi Cheliah won the tenth series in 2018.

== Changes ==
Reversing a change from the previous series, this series once again broadcast the audition and preliminary stages of the competition. The weekly theme format was also dropped. Series 6 also introduced the "power apron", which granted its wearer a number of advantages across a series of challenges. In elimination challenges and pressure tests, contestants wore black aprons embroidered with their names. Immunity challenges were also redesigned, now having a preliminary round between three contestants before the winner moved on to cook for immunity against a professional chef. Kylie Kwong appeared as a recurring guest judge and immunity challenge mentor.

== Contestants ==
=== Top 24 ===
The full Top 24 were revealed on Tuesday, 6 May. At the first Top 24 challenge, it was revealed that Cecilia Vuong, who was recovering from brain surgery due to a skiing injury, had withdrawn from the competition upon medical advice. Georgia Hughes, who had been the last person eliminated in the Top 50 portion of the show, entered as her replacement.

Contestant	Age	State	Occupation	Status
Brent Owens	24	VIC	Bobcat driver	Winner 28 July
Laura Cassai	18	SA	Health science student	Runner-up 28 July
Emelia Jackson	24	VIC	Marketing coordinator	Eliminated 27 July
Jamie Fleming	26	NSW	Bartender	Eliminated 24 July
Tracy Collins	38	SA	Hairdresser	Eliminated 21 July
Ben Macdonald	36	QLD	IT systems consultant	Eliminated 20 July
Amy Shields	37	WA	Learning systems admin	Eliminated 17 July
Renae Smith	31	NSW	Brand developer	Eliminated 10 July
Sarah Todd	27	QLD	Model	Eliminated 7 July; Returned 24 June; Eliminated 12 June
Colin Sheppard	51	SA	Winemaker	Eliminated 3 July
Kira Westwick	31	QLD	Nutritional coach	Eliminated 30 June
Georgia Hughes	18	SA	Physiotherapy student	Eliminated 23 June
Tash Shan	27	ACT	Social media manager	Eliminated 19 June
Byron Finnerty	27	VIC	Deckhand	Eliminated 16 June
Sam Gant	26	VIC	Kidswear designer	Eliminated 9 June
Rachael Ciesiolka	45	NT	Data manager	Eliminated 5 June
Steven Peh	20	WA	Commerce student	Eliminated 2 June
Sean Baxter	31	VIC	Brand manager	Eliminated 29 May
Scott Yeoman	32	SA	Carpenter	Eliminated 26 May
Emily Loo	31	QLD	Resort sales coordinator	Eliminated 22 May
Nick Doyle	22	NSW	Law student	Eliminated 19 May
Nicole Cleave	55	WA	Inflight manager	Eliminated 14 May
Deepali Behar	30	WA	Dentist	Eliminated 12 May
Brendan Langfield	26	QLD	Retail manager	Eliminated 8 May
Cecilia Vuong	30	VIC	School maths teacher	Withdrew 7 May

Future appearances

- Brent Owens appeared on Series 7 as a guest judge for a Mystery Box Challenge.
- Cecelia Vuong returned for Series 8 to have a second chance to win but reached 17th place.
- Brent also appeared in series 10 to support the Top 50. Laura Cassai (now Sharrad), Emelia Jackson, Jamie Fleming, Tracy Collins, Ben MacDonald & Georgia Hughes appeared at the Semi Final round as guests.
- Brent was a guest for the grand finale service challenge in series 11
- Laura, Emelia and Tracy appeared on Series 12. Tracy was eliminated on 24 May 2020, finishing 13th. Emelia won the competition on 20 July 2020, with Laura placing runner-up for a second time.
- Emelia appeared on the 3rd Junior Series as a guest judge for a Mystery Box Challenge.
- Emelia appeared as a guest judge for the first mystery box challenge of series 13, while Laura appeared for a masterclass.
- Brent was present for final score reveals in the grand finales of series 7, 8, 9, 10, 11, and 13, the latter in which he was joined by Laura and Emelia.
- Sarah Todd appeared on Series 14 for another chance to win the title. Sarah placed runner-up on 12 July 2022.
- Emelia appeared on Series 15 as a guest judge for an elimination challenge.
- Laura & Emelia appeared on Series 16 as guests for the 1st service challenge.
- Emelia competed on the second series of Dessert Masters. She was runner up on 24 November 2024.
- Jamie and Ben appeared on Series 17 for another chance to win. Laura & Sarah also appeared for their 3rd chance to win. Sarah was eliminated on 27 July 2025, finishing 6th. Ben was eliminated on 29 July 2025, finishing 5th. Jamie was eliminated on 11 August 2025, finishing 3rd, and Laura won the competition on 12 August 2025.

== Guest chefs ==
- Julie Goodwin – Mystery Box Challenge 1
- Adam Liaw – Mystery Box Challenge 1
- Kate Bracks – Mystery Box Challenge 1
- Andy Allen – Mystery Box Challenge 1
- Emma Dean – Mystery Box Challenge 1
- Shannon Bennett – Pressure Test 1
- Alla Wolf-Tasker – Pressure Test 2
- Ollie Gould – Immunity Challenge 1
- Christy Tania – Pressure Test 3
- Benjamin Cooper – Immunity Challenge 2
- Darren Purchese – Team Challenge 3, MasterClass 2
- Joe Grbac – Pressure Test 4
- Scott Picket – Pressure Test 4
- Matt Stone – Immunity Challenge 3
- Nobu Matsuhisa – Pressure Test 5
- Jock Zonfrillo – Immunity Challenge 4
- Marco Pierre White – Week 6
- Donovan Cooke – Immunity Challenge 5
- Vikas Khanna – Pressure Test 7
- Jason Jones – Immunity Challenge 6 (Note: The candidate got to choose between the two cooks, Jones did not cook.)
- James Viles – Immunity Challenge 6 (Note: The candidate got to choose between the two cooks, Viles cooked in the immunity challenge.)
- Nick Palumbo – Pressure Test 9
- John Lawson – Immunity Challenge 7
- Dave Verhuel – Elimination Challenge 9
- Heston Blumenthal – Week 11
- Peter Gilmore – Final

== Elimination chart ==
No.	Week	1		2		3		4		5		6		7		8			9			10		11	Finals				
No.	Mystery Box Challenge Winner	Nick		Kira		Scott		Emelia		Emelia		Ben		Laura		Tracy			Brent			Amy		Ben	Brent; Emelia; Tracy			Brent	
No.	Invention Test Winner	Laura; Sean; Jamie		Sarah		Tracy; Amy; Laura		Tash; Sarah; Brent		Brent; Renae; Rachael		Amy; Colin; Georgia		Tracy; Laura; Ben		Emelia; Brent; Jamie			None			Amy; Laura; Ben		Brent	Laura			Laura	
No.	Immunity Challenge	None		None		Lose: Tracy		Lose: Tash		Lose: Rachael		Lose: Amy		Win: Laura		None			Win: Tracy			Lose: Amy		None	Win: Laura; Lose: Emelia			None	
1	Brent	Top 24	Btm 9	IN	Btm 6	IN	Btm 6	Top 3	Btm 3	Top 3	Team Lose	IN	Team Lose	IN	Btm 2	Top 3	Team Win		Btm 5	Team Lose		IN	Team Lose 2	Btm 4	Top 3	Btm 2	Btm 3	Top 2	WINNER
2	Laura	Top 24	Top 3	IN	Team Lose	Top 3	Team Win	IN	Team Win	IN	Team 2nd	Btm 3	Team Win	Top 3	Team Lose/Imm.	Btm 2	Team Lose		IN	T.L.	Saved	Top 3	Team Win	Top 3	Btm 3	Top 3	ADV	Top 2	Runner-up
3	Emelia	Top 24	Btm 21	IN	Team Win	IN	Team Lose	IN	Team Win	IN	Team 3rd	IN	Team Lose	IN	Team Lose	Top 3	Team Win		IN	Team Win		Btm 3	Team 2nd	Top 3	Top 3	Top 3	Btm 3	3rd	Eliminated (Ep 59)
4	Jamie	Top 24	Top 3	Btm 3	Team Win	IN	Btm 6	Btm 3	Team Win	IN	Team 3rd	IN	Team Lose	IN	Team Win	Top 3	Team Win		Btm 3	Team Win		IN	Team Win	Top 3	Btm 3	Top 3	Elim	Eliminated (Ep 58)	
5	Tracy	Top 24	Btm 21	IN	Btm 6	Top 3	Team Lose	IN	Team Win	IN	Team Win	IN	Btm 3	Top 3	Team Win	Win	Win	P.A.	IN	Team Win		Btm 3/Imm.	Team Lose 2	Btm 2	Top 3	Elim	Eliminated (Ep 55)		
6	Ben	Top 24	Btm 9	IN	Team Win	IN	Team Lose	IN	Team Win	Btm 4	Team Lose	IN	Team Win	Top 3	Team Win	IN	Team Lose		Btm 5	Team Win		Top 3	Team Lose 1	Btm 4	Elim	Eliminated (Ep 54)			
7	Amy	Top 24	Btm 9	IN	Team Lose	Top 3	Team Win	IN	Team Lose	IN	Team 2nd	Top 3	Team Win	Btm 3	Team Win	Btm 4	Team Win		IN	Team Lose		Top 3	Team 2nd	Elim	Eliminated (Ep 53)				
8	Renae	Top 24	Btm 9	IN	Team Win	IN	Team Win	IN	Team Win	Top 3	Team 3rd	IN	Team Win	IN	Team Win	Btm 4	Team Win		IN	Btm 2		Btm 4	Elim	Eliminated (Ep 48)					
9	Sarah	Top 24	Btm 21	Win	Team Win	Btm 3	Team Win	Top 3	Team Win	Btm 4	Team Win	IN	Elim	Eliminated (Ep 28)			Team Lose		IN	Team Win		Elim	Re-eliminated (Ep 45)						
10	Colin	Top 24	Btm 21	IN	Team Win	IN	Team Win	IN	Team Lose	IN	Team 3rd	Top 3	Btm 3	IN	Team Lose	IN	Team Lose		Btm 3	Elim		Eliminated (Ep 43)							
11	Kira	Top 24	Btm 21	Top 3	Team Win	IN	Team Win	IN	Btm 3	IN	Team Win	IN	Team Win	IN	Team Lose	IN	Team Lose		Elim	Eliminated (Ep 40)									
12	Georgia	Return	Btm 21	IN	Team Win	IN	Btm 6	IN	Team Lose	IN	Team 2nd	Top 3	Team Win	IN	Team Win	Elim	Re-Eliminated (Ep 35)												
13	Tash	Top 24	Btm 21	IN	Team Lose	IN	Team Win	Top 3	Team Lose	IN	Team Lose	IN	Team Win	Btm 3	Elim	Eliminated (Ep 33)													
14	Byron	Top 24	Btm 21	Top 3	Btm 6	IN	Team Win	IN	Team Win	Btm 4	Team 2nd	Btm 3	Team Lose	Elim	Eliminated (Ep 30)														
15	Sam	Top 24	Btm 9	IN	Team Win	IN	Team Lose	IN	Team Lose	IN	Team Win	Elim	Eliminated (Ep 25)																
16	Rachael	Top 24	Btm 3	IN	Team Lose	IN	Team Win	IN	Team Lose	Top 3	Elim	Eliminated (Ep 23)																	
17	Steven	Top 24	Btm 9	IN	Btm 6	IN	Btm 3	Btm 3	Team Win	Elim	Eliminated (Ep 20)																		
18	Sean	Top 24	Top 3	IN	Team Win	Btm 3	Btm 3	IN	Elim	Eliminated (Ep 18)																			
19	Scott	Top 24	Btm 21	DNP	Btm 6	IN	Team Win	Elim	Eliminated (Ep 15)																				
20	Emily	Top 24	Btm 21	IN	Team Lose	IN	Elim	Eliminated (Ep 13)																					
21	Nick	Top 24	Btm 21	Btm 3	Team Win	Elim	Eliminated (Ep 10)																						
22	Nicole	Top 24	Btm 21	IN	Elim	Eliminated (Ep 8)																							
23	Deepali	Top 24	Btm 3	Elim	Eliminated (Ep 6)																								
24	Brendan	Top 24	Elim	Eliminated (Ep 4)																									
25	Cecilia	Left	Left (Ep 3)																										
	Eliminated	(Georgia) Cecilia	Brendan	Deepali	Nicole	Nick	Emily	Scott	Sean	Steven	Rachael	Sam	Sarah; 1st elimination	Byron	Tash	Georgia	None		Kira	Colin		Sarah; Re-elimination	Renae	Amy	Ben	Tracy	Jamie	Emelia	Laura; 80 points
	Eliminated	(Georgia) Cecilia	Brendan	Deepali	Nicole	Nick	Emily	Scott	Sean	Steven	Rachael	Sam	Sarah; 1st elimination	Byron	Tash	Georgia	None		Kira	Colin		Sarah; Re-elimination	Renae	Amy	Ben	Tracy	Jamie	Emelia	Brent; 83 points (win)

== Episodes and ratings ==
Colour key:
– Highest rating during the series
– Lowest rating during the series

Ep no./ Wk-ep no.	Original airdate	Episode title / event	Total viewers (5 metro cities)	Nightly ranking	Ref.
Week 1
1/01-1	Monday, 5 May 2014	Series Premiere: Auditions Part 1 – Contestants started Series 6 with a challenge to cook their signature dish in one hour, vying for automatic entry into the Top 24. Originally there were twelve contestants who passed the auditions but Matt announced to the other remaining contestants that they still had a chance to present their dishes where two contestants (to a total of fourteen) joined the Top 24. Eighteen contestants, who were given a second chance, cooked again in the following episode.	874,000	#10	
2/01-2	Tuesday, 6 May 2014	Auditions Part 2 – The eighteen second-chance contestants competed in a two-round challenge for the ten remaining spots in the Top 24. The first round was an invention test where they had 75 minutes to cook a dish using one of three core skills: filleting, butchering and baking. Jamie, Brendan, Scott, Brent, Kira, Renae and Nick delivered the best dishes, received an apron each and joined the Top 24. The five other contestants, whose dishes had technical issues and failed to impress the judges, did not compete in the second round and were eliminated. The six remaining contestants faced a pressure test to claim the last three spots in the Top 24. They had two hours to recreate George's dessert, "Lemon, Lime and Bitters". Steven's version of the dish highly impressed the judges during tasting, and he won an apron. Afterwards, the last two aprons were given to Sarah and Byron.	847,000	#9	
3/01-3	Wednesday, 7 May 2014	Top 24 Mystery Box Challenge and Invention Test – Georgia returned to the competition after Cecelia withdrew due to brain surgery. The Top 24 got their first challenge, in which the past five winners each chose a core ingredients for the mystery box: Julie Goodwin chose lemons, Adam Liaw selected guava, Kate Bracks picked white chocolate, Andy Allen chose hazelnuts and Emma Dean selected rhubarb, and the contestants had with one hour to cook a dish using those ingredients. Georgia, Ben, Sarah, Tash and Nick were each chosen by the past winners as the Top 5, and Nick won the challenge with his salted hazelnut crumb, lemon curd and white chocolate mousse. The theme of the invention test was the past (over present and future), and the contestants had 90 minutes to make a dish from the past chosen by Nick. The three contestants with the best dishes were saved from the first elimination challenge. In the end, the judges saved Laura, Sean and Jamie from elimination.	787,000	#11	
4/01-4	Thursday, 8 May 2014	Chinese Cuisine Elimination Challenge – The remaining contestants faced a three-round elimination challenge set by in-house mentor Kylie Kwong based on Chinese cuisine. In the first round, they had 30 minutes to cook fried rice with different ingredients in the pantry that are not used in Chinese cooking, and the top 12 contestants were safe from the next round. In the second round, each of the remaining contestants had to name a Chinese ingredient, and the first three to guessed an ingredient incorrectly cooked in the final round. Deepali, Rachael and Brendan had 60 minutes to cook a Chinese dishes using the ingredients that were guessed correctly in the second round. Rachael's Sichuan pepper and coriander crab with Chinese broccoli was praised by the judges. Deepali served only three dumplings which did not have enough filling and had technical issues, despite being praised by the judges for its taste. Brendan, who had inexperience with Chinese cuisine, presented a raw pork loin, which missed the mark on the theme of the challenge, which resulted in his elimination.	1,001,000	#5	
Week 2
5/02-1	Sunday, 11 May 2014	Mystery Box Challenge and Breakfast Invention Test – The contestants had 60 minutes to make a dish using the following ingredients from the mystery box: chicken, licorice, pineapple, pistachios, cinnamon, beetroot, yogurt and thyme. The top three contestants were named and Kira won the challenge. She chose eggs from a choice of breakfast ingredients for the contestants (except Scott) to make a breakfast dish with in the 60-minute invention test. The winner was granted an advantage for their first team challenge. Kira was among the top three contestants, but it was Sarah who won the advantage with her scotch quail eggs. Deepali, Nick and Jamie were sent to the pressure test after their dishes had serious issues. Because of his decision to sit out the second challenge, Scott was also sent to the pressure test per the rules of the competition.	770,000	#10	
6/02-2	Monday, 12 May 2014	Pressure Test: Shannon Bennett's Fillet of Beef – Shannon Bennett presented his Filet De Boeuf Et Pommes Souffle Au Jus Gras for Deepali, Nick, Jamie and Scott to recreate in one and a half hours. This pressure test led to all the contestants struggling. Scott made various mistakes during the challenge, but his steak and pommes soufflées impressed the judges apart from the jus gras. Nick's steak was very rare and it wasn't cut correctly after he repeatedly burned himself. Deepali's steak was unevenly cooked and her pommes didn't rise, while Jamie's pommes lacked salt and his jus gras was too thick. In the end, the fact that Deepali's Hindu religion forbade her from either tasting or cooking a steak proved to be her disadvantage, and that was enough to seal her elimination.	735,000	#13	
7/02-3	Tuesday, 13 May 2014	Restaurant Takeover Team Challenge – At St Kilda Beach in Melbourne, the 22 contestants faced their first team challenge, in which they had four hours to prepare and serve to customers at two restaurants: Captain Baxter (from upstairs) and Republica (in downstairs), both headed by executive chef Matt Dawson. The two teams got identical pantries to create their own menus and select pricing, and the team that earned the most money won. After winning the invention test, Sarah earned the advantage of choosing her own team and restaurant of choice as team captain. She chose Nick, Kira, Sam, Jamie, Sean, Colin, Georgia, Emelia, Renae and Ben to cook dishes for Republica as the Red Team, while Tracy volunteered to lead the Blue Team, which consisted of the remaining contestants, in Captain Baxter. Although both teams struggled, they both produced great dishes, but Tracy's pricing strategy failed to attract more customers, handing the win to the Red Team ($2477 to $1952) and sent her team to the elimination challenge.	701,000	#14	
8/02-4	Wednesday, 14 May 2014	Three Dishes from One Snapper Elimination Challenge – The 11 members of the Blue Team faced a three-round elimination challenge, in which they had 30 minutes to cook a dish using one snapper. Tash, Emily, Laura, Rachael and Amy made the best dishes. However, the other contestants were saved after Nicole took the crucial risk of using her whole snapper in the first round, despite the judges' pleading. Unfortunately, that risk didn't pay off as her fish lacked crispness due to an overuse of the hot oil dressing, and without any remaining protein to cook with in the second round, Nicole was automatically eliminated.	889,000	#10	
8/02-4	Thursday, 15 May 2014	Masterchef Australia: Class of 2014 – This episode featured behind the scenes of the show and on-set interviews from this year's Top 24 contestants.	578,000	#14	
Week 3
9/03-1	Sunday, 18 May 2014	Maggie Beer's Mystery Box Challenge and Spanish Invention Test – Maggie Beer's choice of mystery box ingredients consisted of octopus, dark chocolate, pears, parsley, bay leaves, capers, Japanese plums, vinno cotto and her signature ver jus, and the contestants were given 60 minutes to make a dish using those ingredients. Kira, Sarah, Emily, Scott and Rachael had standout dishes, and Scott won the challenge with his chocolate ganache tart. The invention test was set by chef Frank Camorra of MoVida, and, from a choice of three Spanish ingredients, chorizo, rabbit and citruses, Scott chose chorizo. With all the contestants choosing to pair the key ingredient with squid in their dishes, it was Laura, Tracy and Amy that won over the judges and the chance to cook for immunity. Jamie was criticised by the judges for his use of the nightshade flowers, but it was Sean, Nick and Sarah who were sent to the pressure test for serving dishes with raw squid.	924,000	#7	
10/03-2	Monday, 19 May 2014	Pressure Test: Alla Wolf-Tasker's Rivers and Lakes – Sean, Nick and Sarah had two hours to recreate Lake House executive chef Alla Wolf-Tasker's dish, "Rivers and Lakes". Sean's curing of both fishes was praised in the judging, but his consommé was cloudy and lacked depth of flavour. Sarah's dish impressed the judges, but her watercress puree was overly acidic and lacked vibrance. However, those errors were outweighed by Nick's poor plating and missing elements, along with his soggy crispy skin and deplorable watercress puree, which resulted in his elimination.	748,000	#17	
11/03-3	Tuesday, 20 May 2014	Immunity Challenge: Ollie Gould – Laura, Tracy and Amy competed in the first round of immunity. They faced a small mystery box challenge, where they had 30 minutes to cook an amuse-bouche using a mystery box containing tiny ingredients (quail, quail eggs, melba toast, honey, candied beetroot, chili and finger lime), small cooking equipment and required staples (without using anything from the garden). Despite being critiqued on the presentation of her dish, Tracy won the challenge with her quail ballontine to cook against Ollie Gould of Stokehouse in Melbourne. The chef decided to cook a dish with fruit in one hour and Tracy had 75 minutes to cook her dish using the chosen key ingredient. The pastry in Tracy's Lemon and Lime Curd Tart with Candied Orange Peel and Italian Meringue earned praise the judges but the meringue was over-whipped and the curd was runny, and she scored 20 points. Ollie's Seared Pork Loin and Summer Fruits with Pickled Beetroot and Prosciutto had notable flaws, but his pork was perfectly cooked, and he scored 24 points to win.	780,000	#13	
12/03-4	Wednesday, 21 May 2014	Three-Course Team Challenge from Memory: Cutler & Co. and Ezard – The contestants were split randomly into two teams and had to cook a three-course meal for 30 guests at two restaurants in Melbourne: Cutler & Co. and Ezard. The Blue Team, led by Sarah and vice-captain Tash, were assigned to cook dishes from Ezard while The Red Team, led by Jamie and vice-captain Emelia, were assigned to Cutler & Co. The captain and vice captain went to the restaurants and had to memorise the directions of the recipes from the chef of each restaurant (Teage Ezard and Andrew McConnell of Cutler & Co). They then returned to the MasterChef kitchen to relay to their other team members instructions to be able to replicate the dishes in 90 minutes. During service, the watercress puree in the Red Team's entrée was bitter, while the plum broth in the Blue Team's main course had an odd taste. Both teams had technical issues with their desserts – the Red Team had issues in demolding their panna cottas, missing the caramel topping and there was an error in their syrup, while the Blue Team's honey jelly didn't set and their sorbets melted, but their cheesecake and crumb were well received in judging, and the Blue Team won. The Red Team was sent to elimination.	928,000	#8	
13/03-5	Thursday, 22 May 2014	Sudden Death Elimination Challenge: Fast Food – The 10 contestants on the Red Team competed in a three-round elimination challenge whose theme was fast food. Each contestant chose ten different ingredients for each round with different time limits. Tracy, Emelia, Sam and Ben had the top dishes and were safe in the first round after 30 minutes. Jamie, Georgia and Brent were next to be declared safe in the 20-minute second round while Sean, Emily and Steven cooked in the 10-minute third round. Despite having issues in filleting his fish, Steven delivered the best dish while the judges critiqued Sean's inconsistent cooking of his liver, but Emily's banana fritters had technical issues after she mistakenly fried the plantain – the stiffened texture and loss of sweetness in the dish sealed her elimination.	870,000	#7	
13/03-5	Thursday, 22 May 2014	MasterClass: Maggie Beer, Alla Wolf-Tasker, Gary Mehigan, George Calombaris, Kylie Kwong and Matt Preston – The nineteen remaining contestants were presented by the judges, Kylie, Maggie and Alla with their recipes in their first MasterClass: Maggie's Octopus with Squid Ink Pasta, Alla's Red Wine Pears, Gary's Ocean Trout on Rosti, George's Walnut with Blue Cheese Mousse, Kylie's Blue Swimmer Crab with Stir Fried Greens and Matt's Chicken Italienne.	629,000	#17	
Week 4
14/04-1	Sunday, 25 May 2014	Press Club Mystery Box Challenge and Invention Test: Proteins or Vegetables – George set up the Mystery Box Challenge for the 19 remaining contestants, in which they had 60 minutes to cook a dish with leftovers from his restaurant, the Press Club. Emelia, Kira, Renae, Sarah and Colin were chosen as the Top 5, and Emelia won the advantage with her avgolemono dish. She chose to remove the proteins (including gelatine) from the pantry for the 60-minute invention test. This invention test was a struggle for some of the contestants but it was Tash, Brent and Sarah who delivered the top three dishes while the judges slammed Jamie, Steven and Scott's dishes, sending them to the pressure test.	948,000	#7	
15/04-2	Monday, 26 May 2014	Pressure Test: Christy Tania's Mango Alfonso – Adelphi Hotel's Om Nom Dessert Bar pastry chef Christy Tania from Melbourne presented one of the restaurant's signature desserts, Mango Alfonso, composed of 10 elements, for the Jamie, Steven and Scott to replicate in three hours. Steven earned praise with his dish. He was safe as Scott, who missed the other elements of the dish and whose his choux pastries were too moist, and Jamie, who overused the shiso cremeaux in his pastries and whose mango and shiso sphere toppled on the plate were the bottom two. The main focus of the challenge was the choux pastries, which was one of the key elements of the dish, and with his second take on the pastries failing to excel in judging, Scott was eliminated.	718,000	#15	
16/04-3	Tuesday, 27 May 2014	Immunity Challenge: Benjamin Cooper – Brent, Tash and Sarah competed in the first round of immunity. They had to cook a dish with their choice of one of five different chilies with different cooking time limits. Sarah's and Brent's dishes both lacked spice, and Tash won the challenge with her pineapple and chili sorbet and the chance to cook against Benjamin Cooper of Chinchin in Melbourne. He decided to cook with spices for the second challenge. Tash's Twice Cooked Spice Chicken was praised the judges for the complexity of flavours and her other elements in the dish. Benjamin's Brazilian Seafood Stew was also praised for its complexity and despite the criticisms on leaving the bones as well as the requirement of rice in the dish, he beat Tash, 28 points to 24.	934,000	#11	
17/04-4	Wednesday, 28 May 2014	Four-Course Dessert Degustation Challenge – Darren Purchese mentored the contestants, who were split into two teams of nine, in cooking a garden-themed four-course dessert using the following savoury ingredients: carrot, thyme, ginger and blue cheese in each course. Emelia and Georgia, both of whom thrived in desserts, elected themselves captains, and instructed their teams to design their desserts in each course. Each team had their assigned different garden theme: Georgia's Red Team were assigned with “Sunday in the garden” desserts while Emelia's Blue Team created “Footprints in the garden” desserts. For the first course, they had to create an edible dessert centerpiece using carrots. For the second course, the teams prepared their desserts with thyme as the key ingredient. For the third course, they had to cook a dessert using ginger and liquid nitrogen. In the final course, they prepared a hot blue cheese dessert. While both teams were praised each for their two courses, the combination of the Red Team's inconsistent presentation in their centerpiece and overuse of the salt in their thyme biscuits sent them to elimination as the Blue Team won the challenge.	779,000	#11	
18/04-5	Thursday, 29 May 2014	Blind Taste Test Elimination Challenge – Georgia, Sam, Rachael, Brent, Colin, Tash, Sean, Amy and Kira had 3 minutes to identify and write down 23 ingredients of an unknown dish, which was revealed to be Louisiana Gumbo, blind-folded. The contestants who correctly guessed all the ingredients did not cook in the second round, and those who had correct guesses had 45 minutes to cook a dish using the ingredients they guessed correctly. Both Rachael and Colin delivered standout dishes, while Sean, Brent and Kira were the bottom three. Brent served char-grilled prawns that were too hot, but his excellent performance in the kitchen was enough to be save him. Kira's kransky sauce failed to impress the judges despite burning her hand during the challenge. Ultimately, it was Sean who had a lot more mistakes during the cook than Kira as his overcooked prawns and undercooked, bland flatbread sealed his elimination.	882,000	#5	
Week 5
19/05-1	Sunday, 1 June 2014	Perilous Mystery Box Challenge and Invention Test – The contestants had 30 minutes to make a dish with the option of choosing between the ingredients from the mystery box: tofu, paw paw, zucchini flowers, Vegemite, choko, salsify, cardamom and pheasant, and the given ingredients from the cutting board in their benches: potato, pumpkin, lamb, and brussels sprouts. Georgia, Amy, Jamie and Sarah were among the Top five, using the Mystery Box ingredients but it was Emelia's use of the "safe board" ingredients that won her the second time for the advantage of the invention test with the option of choosing the core ingredient, cooking time and cuisine of her choice. She chose a Thai prawn dish with 45 minutes to cook. However, Steven was feeling unwell and opted to sit out of the second challenge, and therefore, he was sent to the pressure test. It was Brent, Rachael and Renae who made the best Thai prawn dishes. On the other hand, Ben, Byron and Sarah delivered dishes with technical errors and were sent to the pressure test.	885,000	#8	
20/05-2	Monday, 2 June 2014	Saint Crispin Pressure Test: Sweet and Savoury – Byron, Ben, Steven and Sarah competed in a two-hour challenge set by Saint Crispin chefs Joe Grbac and Scott Pickett. They gave the contestants the option of picking one of two dishes. Byron, Ben and Sarah chose to make Scott's venison dish, while Steven picked Joe's rice pudding. All four contestants struggled in the challenge as each had critical issues in their dishes. However, Ben, who had all the elements of the dish on his plate, despite having a burnt crépinette, and Sarah, who received praise from the judges apart from her missing figs and a small strip of cling wrap left in her dish, were saved, despite serving undercooked venison. Byron was condemned for his panicked plating and missing figs, while Steven, despite being motivated with his choice of dish, flustered and presented a poorly executed dessert. Ultimately, Byron's cooking of the venison saved him and Steven was eliminated.	743,000	#14	
21/05-3	Tuesday, 3 June 2014	Immunity Challenge: Matt Stone – Rachael, Brent and Renae competed in the first round, taking turns naming different cheeses. Renae and Brent failed to correctly identify their next guesses, and Rachael won the chance to cook for immunity against chef Matt Stone from Greenhouse in Perth. He chose cheese (over ham) as the core ingredient. In one hour, he cooked a carrot and manchego salad while Rachael made a Lobster Mornay and Cheese Soufflé with Grilled Mango. Matt's salad was praised for the quality of the dish and highlighting the core ingredient, but lacked balance in taste. While Rachael's dish earned praises for her lobster and grilled mango, the conflicting flavours in her cheese soufflé on her dish meant she lost with the lowest score of 15 to Matt, who scored 23.	836,000	#12	
22/05-4	Wednesday, 4 June 2014	Queen Victoria Market Team Challenge – The 16 contestants were taken to the Queen Victoria Market for their next team challenge, where they were split into four teams of four and had to cook a dish with a budget of $700 for ingredients with the team who made the most money winning the challenge. By the time they bought their ingredients, The Red Team attempted to debate between two options for their dish to sell. The Green Team spent all their money buying ingredients for their dish without a captain in charge. During preparation time, tensions between two members of the Red Team (Rachael and Tash) arose on a task of cooking the elements of their dish. In service, the teams (except Yellow) began losing customers due to the poor service in preparing their dishes. Both the Green Team (now led by Amy) and the Yellow Team (with Sam as captain) spent their budget for ingredients. Therefore, the popularity of their dishes earned the highest money with the Yellow Team winning with $3884.35 and the Green Team earning $2328.14. The strategy of saving money on ingredients to allocate to profits didn't work out for the Blue and Red Teams, earning the lowest money each. In the end, the profit of $1600 marked Red Team captain Brent's fifth time facing elimination with his team members.	828,000	#9	
23/05-5	Thursday, 5 June 2014	Elimination Challenge: Time Auction – Rachael, Ben, Brent and Tash faced off in a time auction challenge. Each contestant got 100 minutes of time and had to bid for proteins, produce and condiments in blocks of 5 minutes. Tash had 30 minutes to cook with the mackerel, Asian vegetables and sauces, Rachael was left with 50 minutes to cook with the pork belly, forage vegetables and pantry staples, Brent had 50 minutes to cook with the rib-eye steak, root vegetables and spices, and Ben got 55 minutes to cook with the pigeon, nightshades and dairy. Eventually, the verdict came down to the contestants who excelled throughout the challenge. Rachael struggled during the challenge and produced a dish that lacked quality, and she was eliminated.	931,000	#6	
23/05-5	Thursday, 5 June 2014	MasterClass: Gary Mehigan, George Calombaris, Darren Purchese and Matt Preston – Darren Purchese and the judges presented their dishes in this special Dessert MasterClass: Gary's Pistachio Sponge with White Chocolate Mousse & Yuzu Curd, George's Risogalo Jar, Darren's Apple Tarte Tatin and Matt's three dessert recipes (Flourless Nutella Cake, Simple Peanut Cookies and Instant Ice Cream).	688,000	#17	
Week 6
24/06-1	Sunday, 8 June 2014	"Superfood" Box Challenge & Chocolate Invention Test – The contestants had 30 minutes to cook a dish with the use of nutritious ingredients from the Mystery box, including goji berries, kale, yogurt and lentils. The Top 5 were Emelia, Ben, Colin, Renae and Brent. Despite her third appearance in the five, Emelia lost to Ben, who made the best dish the judges had eaten this season. In the invention test, the contestants were divided into teams of three and had 60 minutes to make sweet and savoury chocolate dishes, and Ben selected the teams. He picked Emelia and Jamie as his team members. Ben grouped Kira, Tracy and Tash; Laura, Byron and Sam; and Brent, Renae and Sarah, and Amy, Colin and Georgia were the fifth team by default. It was the latter team who delivered the best chocolate dishes, including a Chocolate Fettucine with Lamb, and were named the Top 3. While their respective fellow team members’ desserts were praised by the judges, Tracy did not have enough chocolate flavour in her thyme venison dish, but in a close decision, Byron and Sam's chocolate chicken roulade dish was deemed the worst, sending them along with Laura to the pressure test.	736,000	#10	
25/06-2	Monday, 9 June 2014	Nobu Pressure Test – Byron, Laura and Sam faced a two-hour pressure set by famed celebrity chef and world entrepreneur Nobu Matsuhisa, in which they had to make four plates of sushi consisting of six nigiri and six vegetable rolls without a recipe. All three struggled throughout the challenge, but Laura's performance in the kitchen impressed Nobu and she was saved, despite missing one element, while both Byron and Sam were criticised for their inconsistent presentation. A single snapper bone was found on one of Sam's plates, which resulted in her elimination.	830,000	#12	
26/06-3	Tuesday, 10 June 2014	Immunity Challenge: Jock Zonfrillo – Georgia, Colin and Amy competed in the first round of the immunity challenge, in which they had 45 minutes to make a dish using a randomly selected kitchen gadget of their choice: a blowtorch, a smoking gun and a foam gun. Both Colin and Georgia's use of the foam gun and the blowtorch, respectively, had issues with their dishes, and Amy's use of the smoking gun in her puree won the challenge to cook against guest chef Jock Zonfrillo of Orana. Amy was given a choice to either pick between one of the two pantries with 15 minutes less to cook her dish or let the chef pick his choice with the regular cooking time limits. She gave the pick to Jock who chose the ‘pauper’ ingredients containing native Australian ingredients over the ‘prince’ ingredients containing expensive ingredients. He cooked a Roast Beef and Pumpkin with Native Succulents while Amy prepares her Pan-fried Leather Jacket with Potato Puree and Apple Sauce. Jock's dish impress the judges for its presentation, taste, and the clever use of the indigenous ingredients. While Amy was praised for the quality and depth of flavour to her dish, she lost to Jock with the score of 24 points to the professional's 27.	881,000	#11	
27/06-4	Wednesday, 11 June 2014	Diamond Jubilee Wedding Anniversary Team Challenge – The two teams had to cater two dishes, an entrée and main, and prep a two-tiered wedding cake for 80 guests to celebrate Margaret and Eddie's 60th Wedding Anniversary at the Ascot House in Victoria. Within three hours of planning and preparation of their dishes, Blue Team member Brent wasn't feeling well and decided to withdraw from the entire challenge while the Red Team struggled for improvements in their entrée. Both teams struggled to prep their main courses and their cakes. While the judges noted the Red Team's main course being less over cooked and their presentation of their cake, it was the Blue Team's lack of execution in their main and under baked cake that sent them to elimination.	847,000	#8	
28/06-5	Thursday, 12 June 2014	Elimination Challenge: Classic Dishes – The contestants from the Blue Team faced a two-round elimination challenge. In the first round, they had to name a classic dish correctly by writing their answers on cards. Colin, Tracy and Sarah failed to guess their correct answers and were sent to the second round. They had 60 minutes to make a dish using ingredients from the dishes that were correctly identified. Tracy's chicken ballotine earned positive reviews, while the judges criticized Colin's chicken pithivier. However, they couldn't taste Sarah's chicken roulade due to the protein being raw. Though she had been motivated throughout the competition and in team challenges, Sarah was eliminated despite being a top favourite to win.	987,000	#5	
Week 7 – Marco Week
29/07-1	Sunday, 15 June 2014	Marco's Mystery Box Challenge and Italian Cuisine Invention Test – Dubbed the first celebrity chef, Marco Pierre White served as the guest chef for the week. In the mystery box challenge, the contestants had 75 minutes to make a dish using his favorite ingredients: white port, lobster, ginger, coriander, vine tomatoes, olive oil, carrots, cucumber and mixed spices. With Emelia, Kira, Brent, Amy and Laura named the Top 5, Marco picked Tracy as the sixth contestant. He and the judges then picked Laura as the winner of this challenge after Marco was impressed in her recipe profile. In the invention test, the hone cooks had 60 minutes to make an Italian dish using only five ingredients from the pantry and one of three Italian ingredients: (porcini mushrooms, prosciutto and bottarga), that Laura got to choose from, and she chose the mushrooms. She then won the challenge, along with Tracy and Ben, for a chance to compete for immunity, while Amy, Byron and Tash's dishes had technical errors that sent them to the pressure test.	1,000,000	#7	
30/07-2	Monday, 16 June 2014	White Heat Pressure Test: Roasted Pigeon with Ravioli of Wild Mushrooms – Amy, Byron and Tash had two and a half hours to recreate a famous dish from Marco's best-selling cook book, White Heat. Amy was declared safe after presenting a dish similar to Marco's. Tash's plate had two underwhelming elements and she missed the turnips, while Byron, despite having the best presentation of the dish, ran out of time to serve enough sauce. Unfortunately, the lack of sauce derailed the harmony of the elements and failed to match the quality of Marco's dish, which resulted in his elimination.	776,000	#12	
31/07-3	Tuesday, 17 June 2014	Immunity Challenge: Donovan Cooke – Marco demonstrated his knife skills to Laura, Tracy and Ben on how to dice an onion perfectly which they had to do the same in order to advance in the second round for immunity. It was Laura's time and precision of finely dicing her onion that won her the chance to cook against Michelin star chef Donovan Cooke of The Atlantic Restaurant in Melbourne. Laura takes the pick and from the core ingredients of the surf ‘n’ turf dish, choose fish (over red meat) with the same cooking time limit for her and the chef to cook their dishes. She cooked Pan Fried Snapper with Anchovy, Tomato and Caper Vinaigrette with Fennel, Orange Salad while Donovan cooked his Pan Fried Barramundi with Seafood Broth and Summer Vegetables. Despite Laura overcooking her fish apart from receiving praise for the balance of flavour, Donovan ran out of time to plate up and served his dish five seconds late. As a result, the judges couldn't taste his dish and Laura automatically won the immunity pin with 26 points out of 30.	988,000	#7	
32/07-4	Wednesday, 18 June 2014	Taxi Kitchen Team Challenge – Two teams were instructed by Marco and the judges to compete in a British-themed challenge. They had to prep two entrées, two mains and a dessert for 60 diners each before service in the Taxi Kitchen restaurant at Federation Square in Melbourne. Within two hours and forty-five minutes, the Blue Team was still deciding their menu and struggled to prep their main. During service time, the Blue Team served their main dish with raw lamb. Despite receiving praise for their dessert, it wasn't enough to overcome their bland scallop entrée and overcooked lamb dish against the overall praise of the Red Team's dishes, and they were sent to the elimination challenge.	859,000	#9	
33/07-5	Thursday, 19 June 2014	Knife Block Elimination Challenge – To escape elimination, Laura decided to use her immunity pin. The other contestants from the Blue Team had 60 minutes to put their own spin on a classic dish, which was determined by pulling one of seven knives with the names of seven classic dishes, which was the risotto. Kira took a risk in making a quinoa risotto and tomato salad and it paid off, as it was the dish of the day. Tash and Brent were the bottom two. Brent's risotto was under-seasoned, but while her risotto had a smooth consistency, Tash overpowered the acidity of the dish by pouring too much wine in the rice. The lack of balance from both the lemon and wine overwhelmed the delicate flavours, which resulted in Tash's elimination.	1,039,000	#3	
33/07-5	Thursday, 19 June 2014	MasterClass: Marco Pierre White, Gary Mehigan and George Calombaris – The judges and Marco treated the remaining contestants to a masterclass. Marco presented his salt baked snapper dish, a simple spaghetti carbonara and a tuna dish. Later, Gary and George presented their respective dishes.	726,000	#14	
Week 8
34/08-1	Sunday, 22 June 2014	Duel Mystery Box Challenge & Team Invention Test – The Mystery Box Challenge had a twist: the contestants got to decide who would step up to compete in the first round, in which each had to answer a trivia question, and only two remained to face off in the second round. The winner was safe from elimination and an advantage, while the loser was sent straight into the pressure test. Tracy and Renae were left to compete in round two, in which they had to make a dish with the ingredients from the Mystery Box. Both of them were praised for their outstanding presentation in their dishes, but the cloying sweetness in Renae's dish landed herself in the pressure test as Tracy won the challenge. The other contestants were grouped into three to compete in the invention test. Each team member randomly pulled out a knife corresponding with the three choices (cuisine, appliance and cooking method) to cook two dishes. Jamie, Emelia and Brent received high praise with their two American dishes and the use of the planetary mixer and a stove-top, making them the Top 3. Ben, Colin and Kira also received praise for their Moroccan dishes with the oven and the ice cream machine. Laura, Georgia and Amy struggled throughout the challenge (due to their use of the deep fryer and unfamiliarity with Vietnamese cuisine). Despite receiving praise on both of their dishes, their prawns were uncoated and overcooked, joining Renae to face elimination.	863,000	#9	
35/08-2	Monday, 23 June 2014	Pressure Test: Vikas Khanna's Rose-Tea Smoked Chicken Tikka Masala – Laura, Georgia, Amy and Renae had 75 minutes to replicate award-winning Michelin starred Indian chef Vikas Khanna's rose tea-smoked chicken dish. Renae and Amy presented the best dishes and were safe, despite minimal errors on their respective plates, and the final decision came to Laura and Georgia, both of whom had no experience in Indian cuisine. While Laura's sauce was overcooked, her chicken saved her and Georgia's overcooked chicken sealed her elimination.	913,000	#9	
36/08-3	Tuesday, 24 June 2014	Second Chance Cook-Off – The 14 previously eliminated contestants returned to compete for a second chance in the competition. They got to choose between two mystery boxes to make a dish with. The original box contained ingredients of the dishes that had them eliminated to recreate their dishes in 60 minutes and the steel box with ingredients that resulted in their best dish with only 30 minutes to cook. Furthermore, only 10 contestants used the wooden box, while the other four used the steel box. It was Brendan, Rachael, Sean, Georgia and Sarah who redeemed themselves as they made the best dishes. It came down to Georgia's and Sarah's chicken dishes and despite her gritty puree, Sarah's sauce was complex and she narrowly won her place in the competition.	968,000	#8	
37/08-4	Wednesday, 25 June 2014	Starlight Children's Foundation Service Challenge – For winning this week's Mystery Box Challenge, Tracy got to sit out the team challenge. As there was no elimination challenge just for the week, the teams, under the mentorship of Curtis Stone, competed in raising money to be given to the Starlight Children's Foundation for charity. Each team had to cook a three-course meal using citruses. The Red Team, led by Sarah, struggled throughout both prep and service time as they had issues with their dishes. The Blue Team, led by Jamie, did well throughout the challenge. However, their dishes also had issues but the judges were impressed with the quality of their dishes. Both teams raised a total of $48,350 and the blue team won the challenge with a $20,000 donation given to Bendigo Bank. They joined Tracy to compete for tomorrow's special challenge.	899,000	#8	
38/08-5	Thursday, 26 June 2014	Power Apron Challenge – The judges introduced a special apron to the contestants: the power apron. The golden apron would grant the wearer numerous advantages and control throughout next week's challenges. Tracy, Jamie, Emelia, Brent, Amy and Renae must cook in three rounds a three-course meal to win the apron. Brent, Amy and Renae failed in the entrée round while Emelia didn't make it through the main round, leaving Tracy and Jamie to compete in the dessert round. While Jamie's soft chocolate mousse had issues, Tracy impressed the judges with the balance of sweetness in her cookies and cream dessert and she won the golden apron.	1,060,000	#3	
Week 9 – Power Week
39/09-1	Sunday, 29 June 2014	Tracy's Mystery Box Challenge & Invention Test – As the holder of the Power Apron, Tracy took advantages and control of the following daily challenges for a week. If Tracy was sent home, she would pass the apron to another contestant of her choice. Her first advantage was to choose the ingredients in the mystery box that she and the contestants cooked with in the 45-minute challenge. Tracy's second advantage in the invention test was to handpick a core ingredient and to allocate its cooking time in a box for each contestant to cook a dish. Brent narrowly beat Sarah to win the Mystery Box Challenge, and got the chance to switch his box with any contestant besides Tracy. He swapped his box with Colin's for chicken with 60 minutes to cook. Sarah blew the judges away with her crispy tripe, with Emelia and Renae also wowing the judges. On the other hand, Brent landed in the Bottom 5 with Kira, Ben, Colin and Jamie. Ultimately, he and Ben dodged the pressure test as Jamie, whose prawns were undercooked, Kira, whose spices were burnt, and Colin, whose mousse was elastic, formed the bottom 3.	952,000	#5	
40/09-2	Monday, 30 June 2014	Pressure Test: Croquembouche – Colin, Jamie and Kira had three and a half hours to recreate a croquembouche without a full recipe. Tracy had the power to give each contestant a partial recipe of one element of the dish. Colin received the caramel recipe, Jamie had the choux pastry recipe and Kira was given the crème patissiere recipe. Each contestant's croquembouche had one issue: Colin's dish lacked spun sugar toffee and some of Jamie's pastries lacked crème patissiere, but it was Kira's first pressure test that stumbled her. Her choux pastries were brittle, which was enough to eliminate her.	994,000	#9	
41/09-3	Tuesday, 1 July 2014	Immunity Challenge: Jason Jones and James Viles – Tracy's advantages with the Power Apron gave her an automatic pass to the immunity challenge and the ability to choose two other contestants to join her. She chose Laura and Colin and in the first round, the three contestants had 45 minutes to create a bar snack with beer as the core ingredient. Tracy beat them with her Beer Candied Bacon and Popcorn Chicken Sliders for a chance to cook in the second round. Tracy was given the power to choose between two chefs, Jason Jones of B’stilla and James Viles from Biota to compete for Immunity. She picked James and for the core ingredient by coin toss, Tracy's choice was ‘heads’ (containing various animal head parts in the pantry). She cooked Braised Beef Cheeks with Pan Fried Gnocchi while James cooked his Pork Neck and Brain Puree with Egg and Leek. The judges claimed James’ dish missed the mark on flavour and his meat was dry. Ultimately, Tracy's dish earned overall praise and she won the immunity pin with the score of 27 to James’ 26.	991,000	#6	
42/09-4	Wednesday, 2 July 2014	Farm Banquet Team Challenge – The teams of contestants were tasked with cooking a banquet for 20 of the best food producers in the region at the Great Ocean Road. Tracy was given the Red Team captaincy and the power to choose her team, while Laura took charge for the Blue Team. They had to buy their produce with a 300 minute budget to use. The Red team picked pork (45 minutes), shellfish (30 minutes), crayfish (45 minutes), greens (15 minutes) and root vegetables (30 minutes) with two hours to cook, while the Blue Team had one hour and forty minutes to cook with lamb (60 minutes), snapper (60 minutes), duck (45 minutes), greens (15 minutes.) and potatoes (20 minutes). While the Blue Team struggled to prepare their dishes after five hours, it was their lack of sauce, overcooked duck and overcooked lamb that sent them to the elimination challenge as the Red Team wins.	896,000	#7	
43/09-5	Thursday, 3 July 2014	Mexican Cuisine Elimination Challenge – Tracy had the advantage of saving one member of the Blue Team from elimination. She chose to save Laura, while the remaining contestants faced each other in pairs in a two-round Mexican-themed elimination challenge. They had to make a savoury Mexican dish in the first round. Brent and Amy's Mexican spiced snapper with adobo sauce, guacamole and corn beat Colin and Renae's prawn and bean tostadas with Lime and Chipotle Mayonnaise, sending the latter two to the second round, in which they had to face each other by make a Mexican dessert. Both of them opted to make chocolate chili desserts. While they were praised with their dishes, the fondant in Renae's dessert was too floury, but in a close call, Colin was eliminated as his dish lacked cohesion.	1,086,000	#3	
Week 10
44/10-1	Sunday, 6 July 2014	Barter Mystery Box Challenge & Decade Re-Invention Test – In the mystery box challenge, each contestant received one ingredient. They were allowed swap up to 5 of their ingredients and could either accept or reject trades. Contestants got 60 minutes to produce their dishes with the use of the pantry staples (no visit in the pantry and the garden). Renae, Amy and Brent impressed the judges but Amy won the advantage into the Invention Test. Her advantage was to choose between three dishes of previous decades: prawn cocktail from the 60's, apricot chicken from the 70's and Nouvelle cuisine from the 80's. Amy chose the chicken dish for the 60-minute cook. Her win in the second challenge along with Ben and Laura earned a chance to compete for immunity whereupon Emelia, Sarah and Tracy were sent to elimination but because the latter had won the pin from last week, Renae (who had the fourth least-impressive dish) will be sent to the Pressure Test if Tracy decides to use it.	909,000	#9	
45/10-2	Monday, 7 July 2014	Pressure Test: Nick Palumbo's Choc Top Extraordinaire – Tracy decided to use her immunity Pin, and Renae took her place and joined Emelia and Sarah in the pressure test. The three had to recreate four salted caramel soft serve gelati by Nick Palumbo, each with Italian meringue covered in ganache and amaretti biscuits on a sugar cone. With two hours to prepare the components and fifteen minutes to assemble the cones, Emelia and Sarah impressed the judges with their performance. While Emelia was confident and organized throughout, Sarah fell behind early, but mounted a brilliant comeback in the final minutes. However, neither impressed in the tasting as it was Renae who produced the best replication of Nick's dish. In contrast, Emelia and Sarah served up unexpectedly bland ice cream after failing to push the caramel far enough. In a close decision, the judges decided that Emelia's ice cream had a slightly better salted caramel flavour than Sarah's, and Sarah was sent home once again.	1,074,000	#7	
46/10-3	Tuesday, 8 July 2014	Immunity Challenge: John Lawson – Amy, Ben and Laura competed in the final immunity challenge of the season. The first round was to re-assemble the cuts of beef to a diagram. Amy's second try of re-assembling the cuts earned her the win to compete in round two. In the second round, she cooked against John Lawson from No.8 in Melbourne. John take the pick and choose the bitter ingredients (over sweet). He cooked Pan-fried Quail with Braised Radicchio and Pancetta in 75 minutes, scoring 25 points. Amy cooked a Poached Lobster, Citrus Sorrel and Lobster Mustard Mayonnaise in 60 minutes but her poor plating of the dish meant she lost with 22 points to the professional.	1,007,000	#5	
47/10-4	Wednesday, 9 July 2014	Asian Street Food Team Challenge – The contestants were divided into pairs and took responsibility of two and a half hours prep time and serve different Asian street foods for 200 customers in 90 minutes outside the MasterChef kitchen. The teams were chosen by drawing coloured chopstick from a bamboo steamer basket and each team had a chef as the mentor to any Asian cuisine. Laura and Jamie from the Blue Team, under the mentorship of Jarrod Hudson, cooked two Thai dishes. Shaun Presland mentored the Red Team of Ben and Renae in cooking Japanese street food. The Green Team's Brent and Tracy prepped their Vietnamese dishes under Adrian Li. Frank Shek took charge by instructing Amy and Emelia of the Yellow Team to prepare Chinese street food. The Green Team fell behind after struggling to prepare their dishes which took too long to serve and burnt half of the elements. Their Vietnamese tacos made it difficult for the customers and the judges to eat. The Red Team took too long to prepare their dishes. Their Japanese noodle soup earned reviews for the depth of flavour but it was criticised on its bland texture. With 10 minutes to go, the Yellow Team's Chinese pork and mushroom soup earned popularity among the customers which meant they quickly ran out. The Blue Team earned overall positive reviews on their two dishes. Two teams were saved based on the highest number of votes from the customers for each team. The Blue Team earned 79 votes and The Yellow Team got 59 votes. The critical flaws in the Green and Red Teams' dishes earned them the lowest votes each (Green's 51 and Red's 11), sending them to elimination.	971,000	#9	
48/10-5	Thursday, 10 July 2014	Cryptic Elimination Challenge – Ben, Brent, Renae and Tracy faced off in an elimination challenge, in which they had two hours to recreate an unknown dish by head chef Dave Verheul of The Town Mouse. Unlike any other Pressure Test, there was no recipe provided and they didn't get to either guess or know the characteristics of this dish. The contestants got to decipher the clues based on a food critic review by judge Matt Preston to recreate the dish with intuition. The dish was a buttermilk poached pear with walnuts, salted caramel, roast chocolate ganache & pear sorbet. All four struggled to recreate the dish: Brent's sorbet lacked freshness and flavour, Ben did not have enough chocolate ganache while his caramel hardened. Renae missed the walnut crumble, and Tracy overcooked her pear. However, Ben and Brent manage to excel in their approach to the dish and were safe, and it came down to Renae and Tracy, who had issues in making the ganache. In the end, Renae failed to balance the sweetness of the dish and she was eliminated.	1,157,000	#2	
Week 11 – Heston Week
49/11-1	Sunday, 13 July 2014	MasterChef House Pantry Challenge & Australian Food Culture Invention Test – The Top 7 contestants were greeted by Heston Blumenthal at the MasterChef house, and he served as their mentor for the week. In the house kitchen, they had 60 minutes to cook a dish using ingredients from the pantry. Laura, Jamie and Ben made the three best dishes, and Ben won. He was informed that their next challenge was an invention test, in which the contestants had 90 minutes to make an inventive dish inspired from their families using native Australian ingredients. The winner was granted an advantage in the following challenges, while the contestant with the worst dish in each challenge was sent to the elimination challenge and therefore did not participate in the other challenges for. The two stand out dishes were Brent's Roast Lamb with Native Greens, Carrots and Pumpkin and Ben's Salt and Pepper Snapper with Mustard Emulsion and Charred Cucumber. Brent won the advantage, while the worst dishes belonged to Amy, whose Stuffed Quail with Davidson Plums and Sweet Potato had overcooked meat, and Tracy, whose Native Herb Cured Beef with Saltbush Salt and Samphire was too salty. Ultimately, Tracy became the first contestant to be sent to the elimination challenge due to the lack of balance in her dish.	956,000	#9	
50/11-2	Monday, 14 July 2014	Pressure Test: Beetroot Risotto – The six contestants were tasked with making Heston's beetroot risotto with no set time limit. They were not provided with a recipe or dish to taste, and they had to follow along as Heston cooked this dish. For winning the previous challenge, Brent got to see the recipe. However, despite having the advantage, he fell behind throughout the cook. His dish lacked acidity and there were problems with his ice cream. He was in the bottom two with Ben, but the latter was sent to the elimination challenge for overcooking his dish and over churning his ice cream. Amy and Jamie delivered the best dishes, but it was Amy who won the next day's advantage.	1,042,000	#7	
51/11-3	Tuesday, 15 July 2014	Pub Food Service Challenge – Amy, Brent, Emelia, Jamie and Laura faced off in a service challenge, in which they had to cook pub food dishes for 120 guests at The Hotel Albion in Port Melbourne, Victoria. Each got to pick one of the five different classic pub dishes: surf ‘n’ turf, parma, pasta, roast of the day and fish of the day. Amy, after winning the advantage, got to pick first and chose surf ‘n’ turf. Brent picked Parma, Laura chose the pasta, Emelia picked the roast and Jamie received the fish dish. Amy's Pork Belly with Seared Scallops beat Emelia's Roasted Spatchcock with Roasted Potatoes, Lentils and Madeira jus for the second win and the advantage. During the challenge, Laura struggled with the amount of pasta to be served to the as her Pappardelle with Mushroom Ragu was served with less pasta and lack of execution while Brent dropped his sides for the entrée and his Chicken Parmigiana with Fennel Salad did not impress the judges. Those missteps were enough to put them in the bottom two for the size inconsistencies in their dishes. However, Laura's pasta skills in the dish was enough to save her and Brent was sent to the elimination challenge.	973,000	#8	
52/11-4	Wednesday, 16 July 2014	Five Senses Challenge – Amy, Emelia, Jamie and Laura faced off in a challenge where they had to cook a dish inspired by one of the human senses (minus taste) with 30 minutes to plan and one and a half hours to cook their dish. Amy's advantage gave her the ability to pick one of the senses first. She chose sound but although she had the pick, Amy fell behind throughout the challenge as the concept of her Seafood Stew with Fresh Oyster and Bread Roll wasn't convincing to the judges while the fish was overcooked and wasn't handled with care. Laura's Citrus Cured Salmon with Beetroot Jelly and Coriander Oil, which was inspired by her choice: sight, delivered the dish of the day as she was sent to Finals Week. Despite the small errors in Jamie's Green Tea Cured Salmon with Compressed Apples and Green Strawberries (smell) and Emelia's Lemon Verbana Jelly with Pickled Apples, Confit Lemon Segments and Mascarpone Ice Cream (touch), they also made it to the finals. Amy then joined Tracy, Ben and Brent for tomorrow's elimination challenge.	1,215,000	#2	
53/11-5	Thursday, 17 July 2014	Elimination Challenge: Deception – Amy, Ben, Brent and Tracy faced off in the last elimination challenge before Finals Week. In honour of Heston, the theme of this challenge was culinary deception. They had two hours to create a dish that looked like one thing but tasted like something else to trick Heston and the judges. Ben's campfire sous vide beef dish and Brent's chocolate soil dessert earned high praise for the presentation of their dishes. It came down to Amy and Tracy, as both of their dishes missed the brief of the challenge: Amy, despite being motivated in this week's previous challenges, had problems with the presentation of her magic fruit salad dish and her cheesecake plums had issues on the texture, while Tracy's crumble custard dish did not have enough deceptive creativity, although her flavours stood out to the judges. As a result, Amy was eliminated.	1,239,000	#1	
53/11-5	Thursday, 17 July 2014	MasterClass: Heston Blumenthal, George Calombaris and Gary Mehigan – Heston presented his three dishes in molecular gastronomy to the Top 6 for their MasterClass: gin 'n' tonic nitro with the use of liquid nitrogen, fish 'n' chips in two methods to the fish with an iSi gun and his creative black forest gâteau hot chocolate. Next, George made his pavlova and lastly, Gary cooked his lamb hotpot dish.	1,051,000	#4	
Week 12 – Finals Week
54/12-1	Sunday, 20 July 2014	Finals Mystery Box Challenge & Dessert Pressure Test: "Banana Split" – The Top 6 finalists faced their last mystery box challenge, in which they had 45 minutes to make a dish using ingredients chosen by their loved ones, and the three contestants who made the best dishes were safe from elimination. Brent, Emelia and Tracy were named the Top 3, while Ben, Jamie and Laura were declared the Bottom 3. They faced a two-hour pressure test, in which they had to replicate a difficult interpretation of a banana split created by three returning pastry chefs: Darren Purchese, Christy Tania and Nick Palumbo (each chef composed one of the elements of the dessert). Jamie managed to deliver the best dish and he was safe. Ben's chocolate peanut sauce had split and was greasy, while his tuilles were too thin causing them to crumble, and his banana parfait lacked texture. Laura had issues with her banana gelato and her coconut foam lacked spices, but the rest of her elements thrive in judging and she was safe, eliminating Ben from the competition.	1,076,000	#7	
55/12-2	Monday, 21 July 2014	"No Rules" Elimination Challenge – Brent, Emelia, Jamie, Laura and Tracy cooked off in the elimination challenge. The challenge was rather unconventional, with no rules and a time frame chosen by the contestants as a group. They were allowed to cook whatever they liked without access to the pantry and the garden. They decided to give themselves 90 minutes to cook a dish. Jamie's autumn salad with smoked duck, Emelia's baklava parfait with chocolate sorbet and Laura's grilled quail with artichokes and mushroom panzanella earned positive feedback. The dish of the day was given to Laura and she received an advantage in the next challenge. The judges felt Brent overcomplicated his dish, which missed the mark in the challenge and Tracy's plating of her dish was unorganized, having flawed elements and an unfinished plate. In terms of creativity in his dish, Brent was declared safe and Tracy was eliminated.	1,165,000	#7	
56/12-3	Tuesday, 22 July 2014	Three-Round Duel Challenge – Brent, Emelia, Jamie and Laura cooked off in a three-round challenge. Two contestants competed in each round, in which they had to make a dish with the choice of protein and cuisine. For winning the dish of the day, Laura got to pick her opponent in the first round. In round one, she chose Brent and they faced off cooking an Italian fish dish, and Laura won. In round two, Emelia and Jamie had to make an Indian shellfish dish, and the winner of the second round competed against Laura in the final round to guarantee an automatic pass to next week's semi-finals and would be safe from elimination. It was Emelia who won and advanced to round three. She and Laura had to make a Lebanese kangaroo dish, and Laura who won with her kangaroo, granting her the fast pass to the semifinals.	1,123,000	#5	
57/12-4	Wednesday, 23 July 2014	Vue De Monde Service Challenge – Shannon Bennett returned to bring Brent, Emelia and Jamie to his restaurant, Vue de Monde. They had two and a half hours to make the restaurant's signature three-course meal for 60 VIP guests, and the best performer was granted an advantage in the pressure test. Each contestant got to randomly pick one of the three courses by pulling a knife from the block: Emelia picked the entrée, a Slow Cooked Duck Egg with Fresh Pear, Truffle Purée, Shaved Bread and Crispy Saltbush, Brent picked the main, a Blackmore Wagyu Beef with Apple and Ox Tongue, and Jamie received the dessert – a Tonka Bean Soufflé with Chocolate Mousse and Smoked Chocolate Ice Cream – by default. Emelia's entrée was too salty but received praise on the presentation. Brent's dish earned overall positive feedback. Jamie also received overall praise in his take of the dessert. Both Brent and Jamie impress with their performance in the kitchen, but Brent won the advantage as had a positive energy and composure throughout the challenge. He was rewarded with a recipe of the dish to practice for tomorrow's pressure test.	1,128,000	#2	
58/12-5	Thursday, 24 July 2014	Pressure Test: Martin Benn's Chocolate Forest Floor – Jamie, Emelia and Brent had three hours to recreate Sepia restaurateur and award-winning chef Martin Benn's intricate chocolate dessert. Emelia was praised for her dish, but was criticised for the soft texture of her sorbet and the thickness of her tempered chocolate. Ultimately, she advanced to the semifinals, and it was down to Brent and Jamie. The latter's under-tempered chocolate, split lavender cream and missing finger limes did not outmatch the lack of finesse and unstable cloudy jelly in Brent's dish, which was praised for the other elements on the plate, and Jamie was eliminated.	1,171,000	#1	
58/12-5	Thursday, 24 July 2014	MasterClass: Chefs vs. Contestants – The top 3 semifinalists were greeted by the former eliminated contestants to join them for their last MasterClass presented by Matt with his slow roasted lamb souvlaki and George with his version of a village salad. Then Brent, Emelia and Laura cook off against Gary, Kylie Kwong and Curtis Stone in a relay challenge. The contestants cook a prawn dish while the professionals cook a crab dish. Ultimately Gary, Kylie and Curtis won the challenge.	883,000	#7	
Grand Finale Week
59/13-1	Sunday, 27 July 2014	Semi-Finals: Service Challenge – The semifinalists faced the first day of the Grand Finale. They competed in a service challenge, in which they had four hours to cook a main and a dessert for 20 diners and the judges, and only two advanced in the Grand Finals. All three fell behind during the prep time. Emelia made Glazed Beef Cheeks with Jerusalem Artichoke Puree, Brent cooked his Roasted Pork Belly with Apple and Celeriac Cream and Laura made her Smoked Quail with Chestnuts and Mushrooms. All of their mains received high praise from the judges on complexity. Both Emelia and Laura had issues with one of their elements for their desserts, forcing them to salvage it. Meanwhile, Brent's Seasonal Apples with Pistachio and Fennel was declared one of the best dishes of the year, and he was the first person through to the grand finale. While the judges liked Emelia's Whipped Chocolate Ganache with Mandarin Chantilly Curd and Fig Leaf Anglaise, her curd lacked acidity and freshness in the dish to balance the richness of her chocolate elements. On the other hand, Laura's Chestnut Forest sent the judges to heaven, and her to join Brent in the finale. As a result, Emelia was sent home in an emotional elimination, but was offered a pastry chef apprenticeship at The Press Club by George.	1,261,000	#3	
60/13-2	Monday, 28 July 2014	Grand Finale – The grand finale was composed of three rounds and the Brent and Laura had to cook a dish in each round for the judges. In round one, they got to make up their own Mystery Box by individually taking turns choosing their ingredients, and they got 60 minutes to make entrées. Laura was praised for her grilled scampi with anchovy butter, pickled cabbage, roe and pear barley, but her cabbage lacked finesse. The textures of Brent's pearl barley with poached scampi, pickled cabbage and fresh chervil earned overall positive remarks on the complexity of his dish. Laura received 25 points while Brent got 9 points each from all of the judges for a score of 27. In round two, Brent and Laura took charge at the chef's table and had 90 minutes to make a main dish for their special guests: their families and friends. Laura received overall praise from the judges for her butter poached lobster and cooked scallops with chestnuts and mushrooms, while Brent also impressed the judges with his modern take on a Lancashire hotpot, but he was criticised for leaving out the potatoes from his dish. Laura got 24 points (8 each from the judges) for a total score of 49, overtaking Brent, who scored 21 (7 points each) for a total score of 48 points. In the final round, Brent and Laura had to recreate Quay executive chef Peter Gilmore's “Chocolate Ethereal” with three hours to cook and 20 minutes to assemble the dish. Throughout the challenge, Laura struggled in making the nougat component after reading the wrong recipe. She then fell behind when her tempered chocolate seized in her bench and she failed to peel the hot caramel off before time expired. In judging, Brent managed to reinterpret Peter's dish and he impressed Peter and the judges with the textures and complexity. Laura's plate did not meet the brief in the presentation when she didn't chop the nougat and she forgot the tempered sheet components. As a result, she got 8 points each from Gary, George and Matt and 7 from Peter and received an overall score of 80 points. Brent got 8 points from Gary and 9 points each from George, Matt and Peter, finalizing his score at 83 points.	1,654,000	#2	
60/13-2	Monday, 28 July 2014	Winner Announced – Brent won $250,000 as the grand prize, a cookbook deal with Hardie Grant, an Alfa Romeo Giuletta, and a work experience from one of Australia's popular restaurants. Laura was given $20,000 as the runner-up while Emelia was given $10,000 in placing third.	1,703,000	#1	

== Notes ==
Preceded by MasterChef Australia (series 5)	MasterChef Australia series 6; 5 May 2014 – 28 July 2014	Succeeded by MasterChef Australia (series 7)
