= Dito Godwin =

American record producer (1955–2021)

- Born: 1955
- Origin: New York City, U.S.
- Died: November 23, 2021 (aged 66)
- Genres: Rock, hard rock, heavy metal, blues, alternative, pop, country
- Occupations: Record producer, record executive
- Years active: 1975–2008
- Website: ditogodwin.com

Dito Godwin (1955 – November 23, 2021) was an American record producer and executive, best known for his production works with Mötley Crüe, Peter Criss and Ace Frehley of Kiss, Great White, No Doubt and more recently Kevin Carlberg, The Stick People and Kristy Lee Cook of American Idol.

== Biography ==
Godwin started his career in New York as a musician touring with names like Black Sabbath before turning to the administrative and production roles he has worked in for over 25 years in the industry. He has also taught at UCLA, University of Sound Arts, LACC, Southern Oregon University, and guest spoken at NXNW, SXSW, LAMP and many other music conventions nationwide.

In 2003, Godwin consulted with Tony Brown (then President of MCA Records) choosing material for Wynonna Judd's upcoming CD. He was nominated for a directorial award in 2005 for a live music video, "Formula", from the El Rey theater in Los Angeles, CA

Having worked and produced with most major labels, Godwin was also the Director A&R and General Manager of TNT Records in the 1990s and in 2008 he founded EFM Records and is working with several established Artists to release in 2009 on the EFM Record label.

Other 2009 projects include producing a celebrity filled CD with recording Artist and "Stand Up to Cancer" organization supporter Kevin Carlberg, in which all proceeds will be contributed to fighting cancer. Godwin also produced Carlberg's solo CD in early 2008.

== Discography ==
- 1982: Mötley Crüe, Too Fast for Love, Promotion
- 1986: St. Elmo's Fire, St. Elmo's Fire, Dream/ CBS Records
- 1990: Wildside, Heavy Metal Thunder, HBO
- 1990: Wildside,"KID", Tapestry Film.
- 1988: St. Elmo's Fire, Warning from the Sky, Belaphon Records
- 1992: Circus, Tonight!, Eire
- 1992: No Doubt, No Doubt, Interscope
- 1994: Christine Lunde, Butterflies Are Free, Capitol Records
- 1994: Peter Criss (Kiss), Cat 1, T.N.T. Rec.
- 1995: Wildside, Wildside, Capitol/T.N.T.
- 1996: Great White, Let It Rock, JVC
- 1996: Tim Bogart, Soul of Bass, RCA
- 1996: Jack Russell, Shelter Me, R.C.A. Japan
- 2002: Leif Garrett, F8, Indie Release
- 2003: No Doubt, Singles (tk.15), Interscope
- 2004: Butterfly, I Can't Make You Love Me, A&M
- 2004: Charley Pride, Charley Pride, RCA
- 2006: Eric Martsolf, Eric Martsolf, Star of "Passions" (NBC)
- 2008: Sick at He\art, Brutality Step 1, My Name Is Bruce (Campbell) film
- 2008: Kristy Lee Cook, Kristy Lee Cook, American Idol
- 2009: Kevin Carlberg, It's for the Better (Single), EFM Records
- 2009: The Stick People, Trust (Single – Limited Free Download), EFM Records
- 2010: The Stick People, Think About That (Single), EFM Records
- 2010: Hear Kitty Kitty, Moody (Single), EFM Records
- 2010: No Doubt, Icon, USA, Interscope
- 2013: The Stick People, Madness, EFM Records/Bungalo Records/Universal Music Group
- 2013: The Stick People, Think About That (Single – Limited Free Download), EFM Records/Bungalo Records/UMG
- 2013: Substereo, Fuel for the revolution, Gateway Music/Mavin Music
