= Maddi Madd =

- Birth name: Marlon Grimes
- Born: Akron, Ohio, United States
- Genres: Hip hop
- Occupation: Rapper
- Years active: 2000–present
- Labels: Bungalo Records, Universal (current); EMI (former)

Marlon Grimes, better known by his stage name Maddi Madd, is an American rapper from Akron, Ohio. He was signed to the record label Bungalo Records in 1999 and released his first album, A Million Wayz the same year. Maddi has worked with music figures such as Rah Digga, C-Bo, Jodeci, Ginuwine, Bizzy Bone, Devante Swing, K-Ci & JoJo, Flo Rida, DJ Quik, Jamie Foxx and Outsidaz. He has been awarded RIAA certified platinum awards for his contribution to Flo Rida's Whistle and Wild ones multiplatinum singles.

== Musical career ==
Maddi Madd began his career in Ohio. With music rap group Bizness Clique they had a hit on the local radio station in Akron Ohio . The group was then discovered by Grown Man Records President, Ivan Jones in 1995. In 1998 Maddi wrote the majority of the soundtrack to the HBO documentary, Pimps Up, Ho's Down, directed by Brent Owens.

In 1999, Maddi Madd worked with Grown Man Records and released the EP titled A Million Wayz which sold over 100,000 copies. Three years later, his first international single Emotional / Ohio Thuggin was released under the record label 280 East Records.

Maddi Madd started his own company, Blimpcity records, with Chevaliee Robinson in 2002 and signed a distribution deal for Bungalo Records under Universal Music Group Distribution in 2005.

Ginuwine and Maddi Madd's associated act Closer was released in 2009. In 2010, he collaborated with Jodeci, DJ Quik and Devante Swing and released his second album The Midwest Juggernaut.

His second international single Til Ima Zombie was released by Bungalo Records (Universal) in 2012. The music video, directed by Zodiac Fishgrease and the concept of the video was inspired by the 1996 Quentin Tarantino film, "From Dusk 'Til Dawn" and featured American model and actress, Marica Linn in the lead role.

In 2016, he appeared in indie slasher film "Rhyme Slaya" where Maddi played the role of rapper and club owner, "Solomon", aka "King Solo.

Maddi Madd is currently signed to Blimpcity Records distributed by Bungalo Records/ Universal Music Group Distribution.

== Discography ==
=== Albums ===
- A Million Wayz (1999)
- The Midwest Juggernaut (2010)
- Success (2017)
- Success 2 (2021)
- Success 3 (2023)

=== Singles ===
- Emotional / Ohio Thuggin(2002)
- Closer feat. Ginuwine (2009)
- Til Ima Zombie (2012)
- Elephant (2018)
- Watugondowitit (2018)
- On Read (2021)
- Bron James (2023)
