= Three Blue Ducks (TV series) =

- Genre: Cooking
- Created by: Ben Davies; Liam Taylor
- Presented by: Mark Labrooy; Darren Robertson; Andy Allen
- Country of origin: Australia
- Original language: English
- No. of seasons: 1
- No. of episodes: 6

Production
- Executive producer: Ben Davies
- Producer: Liam Taylor
- Camera setup: Multi-camera
- Running time: 23—25 minutes
- Production company: Ronde Media

Original release
- Network: Network Ten
- Release: 13 February – 20 March 2021

Three Blue Ducks is a six-part Australian television cooking show which follows hosts Mark Labrooy, Darren Robertson and Andy Allen, the co-owners of Three Blue Ducks Group, as they travel Australia in search for inspiration to create six new dishes for their restaurant's menu. It premiered at 7:00 pm on 13 February 2021.

As of June 2021, the show was not returning for season 2.

== Ratings ==
No. in season	Title	Timeslot	Original release date	Australian viewers
1	"Art & Soul"	7:00 pm	13 February 2021	137,000
Travel with “The Ducks” Andy Allen, Mark Labrooy and Darren Robertson as they forage for native plants species, catch seafood in the ocean, and meet providers wherever they're to be found.
2	"Episode 2"	7:00 pm	20 February 2021	139,000
Our chefs head to the central west of New South Wales, in search of top quality, ethically produced lamb. Along the way they get some expert lamb cooking tips from the Country Women's Association.
3	"Episode 3"	7:00 pm	27 February 2021	N/A
Chefs Andy Allen, Mark LaBrooy and Darren Robertson dive for prized abalone off the Sapphire Coast of New South Wales. But later when the dish is tested, there's a problem with a key ingredient.
4	"Episode 4"	6:00 pm	6 March 2021	86,000
Andy, Mark and Daz make unexpected food discoveries in Canberra. They're hoping for inspiration to help design a signature trout dish, but catching the key ingredient is much harder than expected.
5	"Episode 5"	6:00 pm	13 March 2021	N/A
Andy Allen aims to dazzle his peers by creating a new age Asian beef salad. He and fellow chefs Mark and Daz search for exotic flavours in Cabramatta.
6	"Episode 6"	6:00 pm	20 March 2021	100,000
Chef Daz hosts a VIP event at the Ducks' flagship venue, The Farm in Byron Bay. The guests are the top chefs of the region and Daz has to put a lifetime of cooking into this single moment.

== See also ==
- List of Australian television series
- List of cooking shows
