= Kevin Carlberg =

- Born: April 28, 1977
- Died: August 29, 2009 (aged 32)
- Genres: Rock, funk rock, jazz rock
- Occupations: Musician
- Instruments: Vocals, acoustic guitar
- Labels: Interscope, EFM
- Website: www.kevincarlberg.com

Kevin Carlberg (April 28, 1977 – August 29, 2009) was an American vocalist and acoustic guitarist. Carlberg is best known as the vocalist and acoustic guitarist of Pseudopod. He completed a solo CD with producer Dito Godwin.

Carlberg was diagnosed with brain cancer. He enrolled in an experimental immuno-therapy treatment at UCLA called the dendritic cell vaccine and after 5 years of remission, the tumor had not returned.

On September 5, 2008, Carlberg was featured on the one-hour "Stand Up 2 Cancer" tele-cast and has been the subject of other notable news casts and articles.

On August 29, 2009, Carlberg died from brain cancer.

== Discography ==
- 1998: Pseudopod (band), Pod
- 2001: Pseudopod (band), Rest Assured, Bonobo Records
- 2002: Pseudopod (band), Pseudopod, Interscope
- 2003: Kevin Carlberg & Friends, When The Muse Visits, Twinner Records
- 2006: Steps For Living, I'm Too Young for This, Benefit CD Track 5 - Been There
- 2007: Kevin Carlberg, The Man Just Like Me, Unknown
- 2008: Kevin Carlberg, Kevin Carlberg, Independent Release
