= Rachel Dean =

Australian clothing designer and manufacturer

- Occupation: Clothing Designer
- Years active: 2010-present
- Known for: Ethical clothing
- Website: ponyblack.com

Rachel Dean is an Australian clothing designer and manufacturer, known for her ethical approach to production. Her fashion company, Pony Black, is based in Tasmania, Australia.

Dean is largely self-taught in design, with her sewing experience coming through industry experience. She holds a Bachelor of Applied Science (Scientific Photography) from RMIT University and worked as an art and science teacher at Fitzroy High School between 2001 and 2009. Her sister is MasterChef Australia winner Emma Dean.
