= The Stick People =

- Origin: Hollywood, California, US
- Genres: Alternative rock, punk rock, hard rock,
- Years active: 2008–present
- Labels: EFM Records, Bungalo, Universal Dist.
- Members: Stephyn Duffy; Mike Stone; Bernie Godwin; Frankie Anthony; M.'. d'Ziur
- Website: http://www.TheStickPeople.com

The Stick People is an American alternative rock/punk rock band formed in 2008 in Hollywood, California, United States, which plays a fusion of alternative rock, punk rock, metal, and other musical styles. Best known for guitarist duo Bernie Godwin, son of producer Dito Godwin, and Mike Stone, former Queensrÿche guitarist.

The Stick People was assembled by the group's producer, Dito Godwin, in 2008 and 2009, with the exception of Billy Close who was brought in by Mike Stone in 2010.

== History ==
=== (2008–2010) ===
The Stick People spent most of 2009 recording their debut CD, but released a digital single, "TRUST" online as a free download. On August 17, they released the debut commercial single "Think About That" through EFM Records, Bungalo, Universal Music Group Distribution.

The band recorded a music video for the song "Think About That" in 2010.

=== (2011–present) ===
After several successful tours from the West Coast to the Mid-west playing with various acts including rock icons like Quiet Riot and Vince Neil, The Stick People will release their debut album "Madness" on April 23, 2013, through EFM Records/Bungalo Records/Universal Music Group Dist. The CD was produced by Dito Godwin (Kiss (band), Mötley Crüe).

== Members ==
=== Current ===
- Stephyn Duffy (2008—present) – Lead Vocals, Guitars
- Mike Stone (2009—present) – Guitars, Vocals
- Bernie Godwin (2008–present) – Guitars
- Frankie Anthony (2008—present) – Drums
- M.'. d'Ziur (2011—present) – Bass

== Discography ==
- Trust (Single – Free Digital Release) (2009)
- Think About That (Single) (2010)
- Madness (2013)
