= MasterChef Australia series 5 =

MasterChef Australia
- Season 5
- Judges: Matt Preston; George Calombaris; Gary Mehigan
- No. of contestants: 22
- Winner: Emma Dean
- Runner-up: Lynton Tapp
- No. of episodes: 65

Release
- Original network: Network Ten
- Original release: 2 June – 1 September 2013

Series chronology
- ← Previous; Series 4 Next → Series 6

The fifth series of the Australian cooking game show MasterChef Australia premiered Sunday 2 June 2013 on Network Ten, with replays airing at 11am the following day.

This particular series of the show was won by Emma Dean who had defeated Lynton Tapp and Samira El Khafir in the grand finale on 1 September 2013.

== Changes ==
With the filming location from previous series at 13 Doody Street in Alexandria, New South Wales shutting down in August 2012, the production moved to the Centenary Hall at the Royal Melbourne Showgrounds in Flemington, Victoria. Graeme Stone replaced Nicholas McKay as narrator.

Unlike previous seasons, the audition and preliminary stages were not broadcast; instead the season started with the Top 22 (instead of previously used Top 24). Series 5 featured themed weeks, starting with 'Girls vs. Boys'. Other themes included Italian and Middle Eastern cuisine-focused weeks, a Kids week and weeks based on regions of the country such as the Barossa Valley and Western Australia. Masterclass was filmed in front of a live audience, with Matt Preston joining Gary and George "behind the stove".

Along with the above changes, this season was also cast with contestant's personalities in mind above cooking ability in response to the success of the Seven Network's rival cooking show My Kitchen Rules. The changes were not well received by both critics and audiences, and led to disappointing ratings compared to previous seasons with the show sitting on an average of 570,000.

The Finale featured three finalists instead of two.

== Contestants ==
=== Top 22 ===
Contestant	Age	State	Occupation	Status
Emma Dean	35	VIC	Ex-Town Planner	Winner 1 September
Lynton Tapp	25	NT	Stockman	Runner-up 1 September
Samira El Khafir	28	VIC	Stay-At-Home Mum	Third Place 1 September; Returned 24 July; Eliminated 17 July
Rishi Desai	35	NSW	Hotel Manager	Eliminated 28 August
Christina Batista	31	NSW	Stay-At-Home Mum	Eliminated 26 August
Lucy Wallrock	31	NSW	Marketing Director	Eliminated 21 August
Daniel Kelty	35	NSW	Stay-At-Home Dad	Eliminated 19 August
Daniel Churchill	23	NSW	Fitness Coach	Eliminated 14 August
Noelene Marchwiki	59	VIC	Optical Dispenser	Eliminated 7 August
Vern Fitzgerald	33	NSW	Bar Manager	Eliminated 31 July
Neha Sen	31	QLD	IT Consultant	Eliminated 29 July
Jules Allen	38	NSW	Social Worker	Eliminated 15 July
Liliana Battle	42	WA	Stay-At-Home Mum	Eliminated 10 July
Pip Sumbak	23	NSW	Office Assistant	Eliminated 8 July
Totem Douangmala	23	SA	Student	Eliminated 3 July
Faiza Rehman	24	VIC	Student	Eliminated 26 June
Nicky Agahari	28	NSW	Pharmaceutical Manager	Eliminated 24 June
Andrew Prior	39	VIC	Ex-Insurance Underwriter	Retired injured 23 June
Clarissa Dodawec	43	VIC	Opera Singer	Eliminated 19 June
Xavier Doran	24	NSW	Carpenter	Eliminated 12 June
Michael Todd	41	SA	Cinema Proprietor	Eliminated 12 June
Dan Tuddenham	19	NSW	Student	Eliminated 4 June

Future appearances

- Emma Dean appeared on Series 6 as a guest judge for a Mystery Box and Invention test Challenge.
- Emma also appeared on Series 10 at the Auditions to support the Top 50. Emma later appeared at the Semi Finals as a guest along with Lynton Tapp, Christina Batista & Liliana Battle.
- Lynton appeared on Series 12 and was eliminated on 19 April 2020, finishing 24th.
- Christina appeared on Series 14 and was eliminated on 10 May 2022, finishing 20th.
- Emma also appeared of Series 16 as a guest for the 1st service challenge.
- Samira El Khafir appeared on Series 17 and was eliminated on 15 June 2025, finishing 14th.

== Guest chefs ==
- Frank Camorra - MasterClass 1
- Maggie Beer - Barossa Boot Camp Day 2, MasterClass 2
- Will Woods - MasterClass 2
- Curtis Stone - Offsite Challenge 1, MasterClass 7
- Shannon Bennett - Offsite Challenge 1
- Stephanie Alexander - MasterClass 3
- Bernard Chu - Elimination Challenge 3
- Antonio Carluccio - Offsite Challenge 2, MasterClass 4
- Stefano De Pieri - Pressure Test 1
- Guillaume Brahimi - Immunity Challenge 2
- Russell Blaikie - Immunity Challenge 2
- Matt Stone - Elimination Challenge 5
- Brendan Pratt - MasterClass 5
- Kate Lamont - MasterClass 5
- Ian Curley - Elimination Challenge 6
- Paul Wilson - MasterClass 6
- Daniel Wilson - Pressure Test 2
- Nick Palumbo - Second Chance Challenge 3
- Aaron Turner - MasterClass 8
- Kirsten Tibballs - Pressure Test 3, MasterClass 9
- Heston Blumenthal - Pressure Test 4, Immunity Challenge 3, Offsite Challenge 4, Elimination Challenge 10, MasterClass 10
- Greg Malouf - Dubai Team Challenge
- Donovan Cooke - Service Challenge

== Elimination chart ==
No.	Week	1	2	3		4		5		6		7		8	9		10		11		12		Finals Week		Finale
No.	Mystery Box Challenge Winner	None	None	Lucy		None		None		Liliana; Samira		None		None	None		None		None		None		Emma	None	None
No.	Invention Test Winner	None	None	Kelty Rishi Emma Lynton Neha		None		None		None		None		Rishi	None		None		None		None		Samira	None	None
No.	Immunity Challenge	None	None	Win: Emma		None		Lose: Vern		None		None		Win: Rishi	None		Lose: Christina Daniel Rishi		None		None		None		None
1	Emma	IN	IN	Win	Team Win	Team 2nd	Team Lose	Team Lose	Team Win	IN	Team Win	Btm 6	Team Win	Lose 2nd	IN	Team Win	IN	Team Win	Team Win	Team Lose/Imm.	Win	Team Win	Top 2	Top 2	WINNER
2	Lynton	Win	IN	Win	Team Win	Team 2nd	Team Win	Team Win	Team Lose	IN	Team Win	IN	Team Win	Lose 5th	IN	Team Lose	IN	Team Win	Btm 2	Team Win	Btm 3	Team Win	Top 2	Top 2	Runner-Up
3	Samira	Btm 3	IN	IN	Team Lose	Team 3rd	Team Win	Team Lose	Team Win	Win	Team Lose	Btm 3	Elim	Eliminated (Ep 33)	IN	Team Win	IN	Team Lose	Team Lose	Team Lose	Lose	Team Lose	ADV	Btm 2	Third place
4	Rishi	Win	IN	Win	Team Lose	Team 1st	Team Lose	Team Lose	Btm 3	IN	Team Win	Btm 3	Team Lose	Win	Btm 3/Imm.	Team Win	Top 3	Team Lose	Team Lose	Team Win	Lose	Team Lose	Btm 2	Elim	Eliminated (Ep 63)
5	Christina	Win	IN	IN	Btm 3	Team 3rd	Team Lose	Team Win	Btm 3	IN	Team Win	IN	Team Lose	Lose 1st	IN	Btm 2	Top 3	Team Win	Btm 2	Team Win	Lose	Team Win	Elim	Eliminated (Ep 61)	
6	Lucy	Win	IN	IN	Team Win	Team 1st	Team Win	Team Win	Team Lose	Btm 2	Team Lose	Btm 6	Team Win	Lose 2nd	IN	Team Lose	IN	Team Win	Team Lose	Btm 2	Btm 3	Elim	Eliminated (Ep 58)		
7	Kelty	Btm 3	IN	Win	Team Win	Team Lose	Team Win	Team Lose	Team Win	Btm 4	Team Lose	IN	Btm 3	Lose 4th	IN	Team Win	IN	Team Lose	Team Lose	Team Win	Elim	Eliminated (Ep 56)			
8	Daniel	IN	Btm 3	IN	Team Win	Team 2nd	Team Win	Team Lose	Team Win	Btm 4	Team Win	Btm 6	Team Win	Lose 3rd	IN	Team Lose	Top 3	ADV	Team Win	Elim	Eliminated (Ep 53)				
9	Noelene	Win	Lose	IN	Team Win	Team 3rd	Team Lose	Team Win	Team Lose	IN	Team Lose	IN	Btm 3	Lose 4th	Btm 4	Team Win	IN	Elim	Eliminated (Ep 48)						
10	Vern	IN	IN	IN	Team Lose	Btm 2	Team Win	Team Win	Team Lose	IN	Team Win	IN	Team Lose	Lose 5th	Btm 3	Elim	Eliminated (Ep 43)								
11	Neha	Btm 6	IN	Win	Team Win	Team 1st	Btm 2	Team Win	Team Win	IN	Team Lose	IN	Team Win	Lose 6th	Elim	Eliminated (Ep 41)									
12	Jules	IN	IN	IN	Team Win	DNP	Team Lose	Team Lose	Team Win	IN	Team Lose	Elim	Eliminated (Ep 34)												
13	Liliana	Win	IN	IN	Team Lose	Team 3rd	Team Win	Team Lose	Team Win	Win	Elim	Eliminated (Ep 31)													
14	Pip	Win	IN	IN	Team Win	Team 1st	Team Lose	Team Lose	Team Lose	Elim	Eliminated (Ep 28)														
15	Totem	Win	IN	IN	Team Lose	Team Lose	Team Win	Team Win	Elim	Eliminated (Ep 23)															
16	Faiza	Win	IN	IN	Team Lose	Team 2nd	Elim	Eliminated (Ep 18)																	
17	Nicky	Btm 6	IN	IN	Team Lose	Elim	Eliminated (Ep 16)																		
18	Andrew	Win	Lose	IN	Btm 3	Injured	Withdrew (Ep 15)																		
19	Clarissa	Win	Lose	IN	Elim	Eliminated (Ep 13)																			
20	Xavier	IN	Elim	Eliminated (Ep 8)																					
20	Michael	Btm 6	Elim	Eliminated (Ep 8)																					
22	Dan	Elim	Eliminated (Ep 3)																						
	Notes	^{See note 1}	^{See note 2}	^{See note 3}	^{See note 4}	^{See note 5}		^{See note 6}		^{See note 7}		^{See note 8}		^{See note 9}	^{See note 10}			^{See note 11}	^{See note 12}	^{See note 13}					
	Eliminated	Dan	Xavier Michael	None	Clarissa	Andrew Nicky	Faiza	None	Totem	Pip	Lilliana	Jules	Samira; 1st elimination	None	Neha	Vern	None	Noelene	None	Daniel	Kelty	Lucy	Christina	Rishi	Samira; 48 points
	Eliminated	Dan	Xavier Michael	None	Clarissa	Andrew Nicky	Faiza	None	Totem	Pip	Lilliana	Jules	Samira; 1st elimination	None	Neha	Vern	None	Noelene	None	Daniel	Kelty	Lucy	Christina	Rishi	Lynton; 81 points
	Eliminated	Dan	Xavier Michael	None	Clarissa	Andrew Nicky	Faiza	None	Totem	Pip	Lilliana	Jules	Samira; 1st elimination	None	Neha	Vern	None	Noelene	None	Daniel	Kelty	Lucy	Christina	Rishi	Emma; 85 points to win

- ^1 In Week 1, the six worst performers from the Protein Challenge then faced off in an Elimination Challenge, from which the Bottom 3 were decided.
- ^2 In Week 2 (Barossa Week), the bottom two contestants from three days of challenges went into the Elimination Challenge at the end of the week.
- ^3 In Week 3 (Kids Week), Christina was unwell and did not compete in the challenge. Further the mystery box challenge winner selected 9 other contestants to compete in the Invention Test, where the contestants with the five most impressive dishes went through to the Immunity Challenge. There was no bottom three for this challenge.
- ^4 Also in Week 3 (Kids Week), the entire losing team from the Offsite Challenge went into round one of the Elimination Challenge, from which the bottom three were decided.
- ^5 In Week 4 (Italian Week), Andrew had to leave the competition due to a constrictive injury. Jules could not cook in the Team Challenge also due to an injury and therefore went straight through to the Pressure Test with the members of the losing team.
- ^6 In Week 5 (Wild West Week), the Sunday Challenge was a Team Challenge. One member from the winning team got a chance at immunity, but there was no elimination challenge for the losing team.
- ^7 In Week 6 (Heaven & Hell Week), the Sunday Challenge was solely a Mystery Box Challenge, with contestants working in pairs. The two worst performing pairs went into elimination.
- ^8 In Week 7 (Fast Food Week), the Sunday Challenge was solely a Mystery Box Challenge, with contestants working in groups of three. The worst performing team went into elimination.
- ^9 In Week 8 (Second Chance Week), no Top 10 contestant was eliminated. Instead, nine previously eliminated contestants (excluding Clarissa, Andrew and Totem) returned to win back a spot in the competition, each teamed with a Top 10 contestant excluding Christina.
- ^10 In Week 9 (Love Week), Despite not being in the Bottom three, Noelene was pulled to the Pressure Test as Rishi used his immunity pin.
- ^11 In Week 10 (Heston Blumenthal Week), as most impressive performer in the Immunity Challenge, Daniel won a free pass to the following week and the Top 8.
- ^12 In Week 11 (World Food Week), the first Elimination Challenge was a draw and neither contestant was eliminated.
- ^13 Also in Week 11 (World Food Week), Emma used her immunity pin to avoid the second Elimination Challenge.

== Episodes and ratings ==
Based on the number of viewers and the nightly ratings, Season 5 of Masterchef was considered the worst season, with the finale being ranked only the 5th most viewed television show that night, compared to every other season of Masterchef ranking #1. It is also the only season of the show to have under 1 million viewers of the finale, and it has received the lowest nightly rankings with several episodes below the top 20 in terms of most viewed shows. In total there were only half the number of viewers from Season 4. As a result of the show's poor audience response Network Ten cancelled all spin-off versions of Masterchef Australia (including: Junior Masterchef and Masterchef: The Professionals as well as live events such as Masterchef Live and Masterchef Dining) in order to focus on "a new, fresh version in 2014 that will appeal to the loyal MasterChef fans as well as new viewers" according to Ten's chief programming officer, Beverley McGarvey.

Ep#/Wk-Ep#	Original airdate	Episode Title / Event	Total viewers (5 Metro Cities)	Nightly Ranking	Weekly Ranking
Week 1
1/01-1	2 June 2013	Series Premiere; Series five started with its 22 contestants being welcomed to Melbourne with their first challenge at the MCG. With the first themed week of the series being 'boys vs. girls', each team of eleven were tasked with creating a three-course meal for their new 'family': the opposing team plus the three judges, on a budget of $204 (what the average Australian family spends on groceries per week). Up for grabs was also an extra $33.70 (what the average Australian family spend on take-away per week) which is given to the winning team of an egg-separating "mini-challenge". Rishi and Clarissa battled it out in the egg challenge for their teams, with Rishi winning the money for the boys. Each team then had four hours to plan, shop and prepare their menu. Both teams struggled to stay under budget while shopping, forcing the girls to neglect cream for their lemon tart which was later criticized by the judges. Overall each team produced one fantastic dish (the girl's Middle Eastern chicken and the boy's chicken pie), one bad dish (the girl's overcooked pasta and the boy's disastrous Eton mess) and one average dish (the girl's lemon tart without cream and boy's thick and slightly grainy pumpkin soup). Despite it being a fairly evenly matched competition, and the boys' meat pie being extraordinary; the mushy peas served alongside the pie were judged to be under-cooked and therefore the girls won the first challenge against the boys, winning themselves an advantage in the next challenge.	1,100,000	8th	20th
2/01-2	3 June 2013	Protein Pick Face Off Challenge; After winning the previous challenge the girls gained the advantage of selecting the protein they would be cooking with from the eleven available options (ranging from beef mince to offal) in a first-come, first-served manner. The boys were unknowingly given the same protein as the girl standing opposite them once they chose a kitchen position. Each pair of contestants with the same protein would face off, either producing a winning dish or a losing dish. The winning dishes would be automatically safe from the elimination challenge, while all the losing dishes would be compared in order to find the worst 6 dishes. Contestants from both teams struggled with the simplicity or complexity of their given ingredient, with Samira mistaking barramundi for Snapper and Kelty's offal dish being branded one of the "five worst" ever tasted on the show, which automatically earned him a place into the bottom 6. In the end Michael, Dan, Neha, Nicky and Samira joined Kelty in the bottom 6, to face the first elimination challenge of the series.	739,000	13th	38th
3/01-3	4 June 2013	Elimination Challenge 1 The six worst performing contestants from the Protein Challenge went into the series' first elimination challenge. After being surprised by the presence of their own pantry and fridges complete with their contents in the storeroom, they were given 60 minutes to present a dish inspired by cooking for their loved ones. Michael scored 'dish of the day' with a simple, but technically well-executed dish of Steak with Hollandaise and Roast Vegetables and was first pronounced safe. Neha's egg curry and Nicky's salmon with savoury egg custard won praise from the judges and were next pronounced safe, leaving a bottom 3 of Kelty, Dan and Samira. Samira's Koshary rice contained onions that were burnt, Kelty's simple stew was boring and lacked the promised soda bread and Dan's caramel for his chocolate tart was rock solid and the ganache was grainy. In the end, Dan became the first contestant eliminated from the series.	860,000	11th	34th
4/01-4	6 June 2013	MasterClass 1: Romesco de peix - Catalan fish stew; the perfect boiled egg; calf's liver with potato foam, apple and bacon sauce; sour cherry pudding; pumpkin soup.	489,000	19th	> 40th
Week 2 (Barossa Week)
5/02-1	9 June 2013	Barossa Boot Camp Day 1 In the first of a series of challenges in the Barossa Valley, contestants were first tasked with breaking down a whole lamb after a quick masterclass from a professional butcher. Continuing the 'Boys vs. Girls' contest, each team started strongly, but both made some crucial errors. In the end, the boys edged out the girls and were safe from the next round. Round 2 saw the girls cooking a dish of their choice, with a range of lamb cuts. Contestants struggled with missing ingredients, using the given 90 minutes and the elements, and the results were mixed. Lucy, Lilliana and Faiza won praise for their dishes, but Noelene and Clarissa were deemed the least impressive and were the first to be sent to elimination.	648,000	15th	> 40th
6/02-2	10 June 2013	Barossa Boot Camp Day 2 Contestants faced a tag-team challenge set by MasterChef favourite Maggie Beer. After a masterclass on skinning and breaking down a whole chicken, the teams picked their lead members who were taken through the two courses their teams had to prepare in the two hours given. Each member had twelve minutes to cook followed by one minute to transfer information to the next team member. The girls team had a few hiccups overall, with small problems found with all of the elements of their main course, but with a flawless dessert. The boys suffered from poor communication and made some crucial mistakes in their preparation, and while their main was faultless, their inability to produce a working pastry meant they didn't serve dessert as it was specified. That was enough to lose them the challenge with Nicky, Andrew and Michael judged the worst performers. The mistakes made by the latter two sent them to elimination.	652,000	17th	> 40th
7/02-3	11 June 2013	Barossa Boot Camp Day 3 The teams faced a seafood relay challenge: shucking oysters, peeling prawns and filleting flathead; the losing team facing round two and the possibility of filling the two last spots in the Elimination Challenge. With each team picking three representatives for each part of the relay challenge, it was a close race until Totem's inability to fillet his flathead sealed the Boys' fate. The next round saw the losing team cooking a seafood dish (with the same proteins as round one) in 60 minutes. In the end, Nicky's overly salty dish, Xavier's poorly cooked fisherman's basket and Daniel's plain fish pie landed them in the bottom three, with Nicky escaping elimination for the second day in a row. Xavier and Daniel joined Michael, Andrew, Noelene and Clarissa in the Elimination Challenge.	715,000	15th	38th
8/02-4	12 June 2013	Elimination Challenge 2 In this double Elimination Challenge, Andrew, Clarissa, Daniel, Michael, Noelene and Xavier were given two and a half hours to revisit the proteins that they failed with earlier in the week. Cooking for twenty locals proved daunting for some, and the pressure caused the contestants to make some missteps along the way. Daniel struggled to make enough pasta in the given time, Noelene found she didn't have the right ingredients or enough oven space and Andrew had to scrap his potatoes last minute. In the end, both Noelene and Andrew impressed with their dishes, and Clarissa was declared safe despite her lamb not being uniformly cooked through. Michael served raw chicken and was the first of the 2 eliminated. Despite not delivering with his pasta, Daniel was saved due to Xavier's flavour-lite curry being called underwhelming, sending the latter packing. With three of the boys eliminated in the first two weeks, the girls were declared winners of the 'Girls vs. Boys' Challenge.	745,000	14th	36th
9/02-5	13 June 2013	MasterClass 2: Berkshire pork loin with cavolo nero and apple sauce; quail dolmades with pickled vegetables and tahini dressing; the smear is dead; the perfect mashed potato; raspberry tart.	549,000	20th	> 40th
Week 3 (Kids Week)
10/03-1	16 June 2013	Sunday Challenge 1 Kicking off Kids Week, the Mystery Box Challenge returned with a twist: the contestants faced a Mystery Kids Lunchbox. Using only the ingredients in their box (such as yoghurt, fruit, sandwiches and juice), plus some basic staples, they had 60 minutes to produce a quality dish, the winner receiving an advantage in the Invention Test. Lucy, Pip, Noelene, Andrew, Kelty and Samira produced the most exciting dishes with Lucy winning with her Eccles Cakes. Her advantage for the Invention Test was threefold: she got to pick the nine other contestants to compete, plus which core ingredient they had to cook with and choose her own out of the three options (liver, Brussels sprouts and anchovies). The ten contestants had to take their core ingredient, one that kids rarely enjoy, and make a dish which three guests judges (eight- and nine-year-olds) would be happy to eat. In the end, Emma, Rishi, Kelty, Lynton and Neha were declared the five best and won their spot in the Immunity Challenge.	890,000	11th	29th
11/03-2	17 June 2013	Immunity Challenge 1 Emma, Rishi, Kelty, Lynton and Neha faced off in an Immunity Challenge with a twist. They had 60 minutes to produce their best dish, with one of them guaranteed an immunity pin, however the pantry would be in complete darkness. With only five minutes to blindly grab their ingredients, and then plan a coherent dish with the results, the contestants struggled with the constraints of the challenge. Kelty and Neha were criticised for a lack of direction in their dishes and failing to produce enough in the time given, and while there were some good elements to Rishi's dish it was Lynton and Emma who rose to the top. Emma's Cos Lettuce Cups with Bugs and Scallops won her the challenge and the first immunity pin of the series.	607,000	18th	>40th
12/03-3	18 June 2013	Offsite Challenge 1 Teams went "back to school" catering for 450 students under the tutelage of chefs Curtis Stone and Shannon Bennett. Each team prepared their lunch menu consisting of four items thought of by the chefs and with their mentor-ship, the winning team being the one with the most popular menu with the judges and students. Vern's leadership of the Blue Team early won praise, while Emma struggled to fill her required role as Red Team Captain. Both teams worked well under their mentors, until service time when the Red Team's organisation was called into question. In the end, the judges gave two votes to each team from the four dishes, but gave the Red's the win for their crowd favourite barramundi Burger with Chickpea Fritters. The entire Blue Team went into the Elimination Challenge.	679,000	15th	>40th
13/03-4	19 June 2013	Elimination Challenge 3 The Blue Team faced a two-round Elimination: a skills test followed by a pressure test. In the first round, the ten contestants had to successfully separate eggs and whisk the whites to perfect soft peaks, holding the bowl upside down over their head to prove their whites were whipped correctly. The first seven contestants were declared safe, leaving Andrew, Christina and Clarissa in the final round. Their task, in three and a half hours, was to recreate Bernard Chu's Lolly Bag Cake with seven layers based on seven classic lolly flavours. Contestants got off to a slow start but all worked through the recipe methodically, until Clarissa made a mistake in her Spearmint Buttercream layer that put her a long way behind. Andrew faced some structural problems assembling his cake and his glaze was too runny, while Clarissa could not get her buttercream done in time and had to leave it out. Christina's efforts won her enormous praise from the judges, producing an almost perfect replication, and while Andrew's technical flaws and an overly "Eucalyptus-y" taste were criticised, Clarissa's lack of some required elements sealed her elimination.	736,000	16th	>40th
14/03-5	20 June 2013	MasterClass 3		>20th	>40th
Week 4 (Italian Week)
15/04-1	23 June 2013	Offsite Challenge 2 Contestants were faced with a Team Challenge to start off Italian Week. Due to repetitive stress fractures, Andrew was forced to retire from the competition on medical advice, while Jules' hip injury forced her out of the challenge and therefore into the next day's Pressure Test. Working in teams of four with the guide of four Italian Nonnas and with Antonio Carluccio as a special guest judge, they had four hours to prep, cook and serve a plate of food for diners on Lygon Street with the winners the ones to raise the most money. The Green Team were first to start service after only forty minutes; their dish of Fritto Misto proving popular, with the Grey Team and their Crostini of Mushroom and Roasted Veal not far behind. The Red Team's time-consuming Arancini dish and Blue Team's lack of organisation meant they didn't start service until well into the challenge. In the end, with $2499 raised, Grey were declared winners, with Green close behind on $1851. Red and Blue failed to raise enough money, and despite slow service and their dish lacking flavour, Red were declared safe. Vern, Kelty, Totem and Nicky were criticised for their slow prep time, lack of organisation and sales skill and joined Jules in elimination.	800,000	12th	32nd
16/04-2	24 June 2013	Pressure Test 1 Jules, Vern, Totem, Nicky and Kelty faced off in an Italian Pressure Test set by Stefano De Pieri. They had 60 minutes to prepare his dish of Quail Ravioli with Sage Butter, but with no given recipe for the pasta. With the limited time given, contestants faced struggles with their pasta (being too dry and crumbly or too soft), breaking down their quail, cooking and pulsing the filling correctly and even with reading the recipe. Ultimately, Jules, Kelty and Totem had the best pasta and well cooked filling leaving Vern and Nicky as the bottom two. Despite Vern's pasta being too thick, it was Nicky's overly processed filling and lack of seasoning that sealed his elimination.	663,000	18th	39th
17/04-3	25 June 2013	MasterChef Pizzeria Challenge; Teams were tasked with their first restaurant service at the 'MasterChef Pizzeria'; including all preparation, order management and even home delivery. Rishi was picked as the leader of the Green Team but struggled to give clear direction, while the Red Team thrived under Liliana's clear management. With a restaurant full to capacity, teams struggled with keeping up with demand and keeping track of the orders needed. While Red struggled with order confusion in the middle of service, Green faced a multitude of problems throughout service: Emma's pizza dough wasn't given enough time to prove resulting in a biscuity crust, Pip failed to bring a correct order for her home delivery and confusion on the pass led Jules to take over leadership of the team from Rishi and Faiza. In the end, while both teams had pizza toppings that impressed the patrons and judges, Green's poor pizza dough and slow service pushed them into elimination.	654,000	17th	>40th
18/04-4	26 June 2013	Elimination Challenge 4 With Emma opting not to use her pin, the entire losing team fought to keep their place in the competition in an elimination challenge based on the colours of the Italian flag: red, white and green. Faced with a wall of colour-coded ingredients, they randomly picked one of the three and could only use ingredients of that colour in their dish. A number of the contestants struggled to design a dish within the constraints given, but by the end, six of the eight dishes created impressed the judges and Rishi, Emma, Jules, Noelene, Pip and Christina were declared safe. Neha, who tried to produce a pizza in only an hour was criticised for taking such a risk on the back of losing a pizza-themed team challenge and for its fairly bland flavours. But it was Faiza's confused dish of meatballs and smashed potatoes, judged to be dry and overly spicy, that sealed her elimination.	627,000	15th	>40th
19/04-5	27 June 2013	MasterClass 4	483,000	19th	>40th
Week 5 (Wild West Week)
20/05-1	30 June 2013	Western Australia Team Challenge 1 The top 15 contestants started Wild West Week at the Fremantle docks. Separated into two teams, they headed offshore to catch their own seafood for a feast for 30 local fishermen, with 60 minutes to prepare their catch once they'd docked. After braving the wild seas and a good deal of sea-sickness, teams called in their catch to teammates shopping for ingredients, in time to meet them back at the dock to start cooking. With 60 minutes to prepare all their seafood and cook a feast, the Red Team found themselves behind in their prep due to their incredible haul. Ultimately, despite providing a range of sophisticated and multicultural dishes, the Blue Team's menu didn't impress as much as The Red Team's simple dishes championing the fresh produce and they won a shot at immunity.	683,000	14th	>40th
21/05-2	1 July 2013	Immunity Challenge 2 The Red Team, as winners of the previous challenge, had the chance to win immunity, but it was down to them to elect one member to face chef Russell Blaikie. The team decided on Vern, because of his contribution in the previous challenge. Vern was allowed 90 minutes (Russell given 60) to produce a dish with the core ingredient of duck, chosen by Russell. With the guidance of Guillaume Brahimi, Vern worked well in the kitchen and with Brahimi's help produced a commendable dish. The judges noted Vern's dish lacked precision in plating, and elements such as the lentils were not cooked enough. Russell won praise for what he managed to put on the plate in his limited time and in the end, beat Vern (28-21).	646,000	19th	>40th
22/05-3	2 July 2013	Western Australia Team Challenge 2 The contestants headed to Kylagh Station in York to cook lunch for 20 hungry stockmen and women, with the farmed beef the focal point of the menu. With limited time, access to only a certain weight of ingredients and only an open fire to cook with, both teams struggled with the conditions. While the judges noted that the quality of dishes was quite even between the two teams, it came down to how well teams treated the prime beef on offer. The Red team were judged to have done this the best, leaving the Blues to decide which three members were the worst performers. Christina, Totem and Rishi nominated themselves based on the judges comments and were sent into elimination.	798,000	14th	31st
23/05-4	3 July 2013	Elimination Challenge 5 As the 3 worst performing members of the previous team challenge; Christina, Totem & Rishi faced a service challenge held at Greenhouse restaurant in Perth. Under the supervision of restaurant head chef Matt Stone, contestants had to prepare one of three pairs of dishes and cook them during the dinner service to 80 diners. Overall, the contestants struggled with the pressure of the challenge and limited preparation time, especially Christina & Totem, the latter having two serves of his Mussel dish sent back to the kitchen. In the end despite Rishi's Mushroom dish lacking seasoning and Christina's marron on her dish being under-cooked it was Totem's performance in the kitchen leading to unsatisfied diners that sent him home.	673,000	19th	>40th
24/05-5	4 July 2013	MasterClass 5		> 20th	>40th
Week 6 (Heaven & Hell Week)
25/06-1	7 July 2013	Heaven & Hell Mystery Box Challenge The fourteen contestants faced a tough choice in this Mystery Box Challenge with a twist: the Heaven or the Hell Box. Contestants (working in pairs) choosing the Heaven Box would have 90 minutes to create a dish from 9 heavenly ingredients as chosen by the judges, while those choosing 'Hell' would have three hours (plus a recipe) to create one of the hardest dishes from past seasons. Four pairs chose 'Hell' and were faced with a Zumbo Macaroon Tower, featuring over a hundred macaroons flavoured with beetroot and olive. Liliana (who had made a Macaron Tower for her sons previous birthday) and Samira produced the dish of the day, and while Lynton's mistake of adding the wrong food coloring meant he and Neha only presented one type of macaroon for judging; they just avoided elimination for how perfect that one type were. In the end, it was two teams who chose 'Heaven' that found themselves in elimination: Daniel and Kelty who overcomplicated a dish that could have taken 15 minutes to prepare, and Lucy and Pip who made the decision to serve their premium wagyu beef with chunks of butter overpowering the simple flavours of the dish.	853,000	10th	27th
26/06-2	8 July 2013	Elimination Challenge 6 Daniel, Kelty, Pip and Lucy faced a two-round Elimination Challenge set by chef Ian Curley. The first round saw them recreating the chef's dish of Steak Tartare with Pumpernickel Biscuit (with a recipe given for the biscuit only), with the best two dishes saving their contestants from the elimination round. Lucy's decision to add lemon juice early, and thus 'cooking' the raw beef for too long, and Pip's failure to plate up the biscuit paired with her overly minced meat dropped them into the bottom two. In the final round, Lucy and Pip had two hours to replicate Ian Curley's Fig Bombe Alaska. Despite Lucy and Pip having varying experience with desserts, they were both on schedule and executed the elements of the dessert well. The difference in dishes came down to the meringue, Pip's over-aerated topping sealing a close elimination.	737,000	19th	35th
27/06-3	9 July 2013	Seven Deadly Sins Challenge The remaining 13 contestants faced a seven-course service challenge based around the seven deadly sins. Cooking in two teams for 70 university students, they had to design and cook seven courses in two hours based around the same core ingredient signifying one of the sins (envy, lust, sloth, etc.). The Blue Team struggled under Neha's leadership with the strong personalities of Jules, Kelty and Noelene butting heads with her over the menu's direction. The Red Team, with one less member, thrived under Rishi's leadership but faced some struggles with preparation and limited kitchen supplies. Ultimately, the judges were impressed with standout dishes from each team leading to a close decision. The Red Team just made it over the line with a chilli dish that, while overly spicy, better embodied the feeling of wrath; Blue were again sent to elimination.	773,000	12th	31st
28/06-4	10 July 2013	Last Supper Elimination Challenge The losing contestants from the previous challenge were given two hours to produce a dish that personified their position: a Last Supper showcasing their skills and beliefs about food. With no limits of ingredients or creativity, contestants thrived and each successive dish wowed the judges. In the end, Lilliana's Four Layer Birthday Cake was singled out for, though well made and capturing the essence of the challenge, being not up to the same standard as the other contestants' dishes and she tearfully bid goodbye to the MasterChef kitchen.	777,000	8th	32nd
29/06-5	11 July 2013	MasterClass 6		> 20th	> 40th
Week 7 (Fast Food Week)
30/07-1	14 July 2013	Fast Food Mystery Box Challenge In this Mystery Box Challenge, contestants were tasked with re-inventing three fast food favourites: fried chicken, souvlaki and burger-with-the-lot. Working in groups of three, they had only as much time as it took Matt Preston to go out and buy all three items. With each contestant making one of the three dishes, they had varying success with some overly ambitious while others playing it overly safe. The judges found fault with at least one dish in each team, and though Emma's burger lacked all the necessary elements and Daniel's souvlaki meat was poorly cooked, it was Jules' inedible Thai-style burger (with a poorly realised bun made of rice) and Samira's bland and under-thought souvlaki that left them plus teammate Rishi facing elimination.	773,000	11th	36th
31/07-2	15 July 2013	Elimination Challenge 8 In an Elimination Challenge with a twist, Rishi, Jules and Samira faced the first ever ingredients auction. With three lots of ingredients (a protein, a dairy ingredient and a vegetable element) to 'purchase', they could bid with their cooking time in five-minute increments. With only 90 minutes of cooking time initially, they quickly bid away their time trying to win their preferred ingredients and ultimately, Rishi was left with 60 minutes, Samira 50 minutes and Jules only 30 minutes. Rishi with plenty of time and well-matched ingredients, wowed the judges with his rabbit dish. Samira and Jules both struggled with their oddly matched ingredients and limited time and both dishes came under scrutiny for their technical flaws. And while Samira served some very under-cooked lamb, it was Jules' bland and mismatched dish of Buttered Crawfish with Vinaigrette and Yoghurt that sealed her elimination from the competition.	800,000	14th	33rd
32/07-3	16 July 2013	Offsite Challenge 3 In a Car Rally Team Challenge, teams were tasked with creating the perfect Club Sandwich with Chips for 50 Alfa Romeo enthusiasts. With three hours on the clock they raced to three checkpoints and competed in mini challenges with the winner of each getting to pick from pairs of key ingredients. At the first challenge, the Blue Team were first to crush six bottles of grape juice and picked sourdough as their bread, leaving Red with multigrain. On the way to the second challenge the Red Team got repeatedly lost and Blue easily won the next two challenges (making the perfect omelette and milking a goat) choosing chicken and sebago potatoes (Red left with turkey and kipfler potatoes) and racing back to Red Hill Estate on the Mornington Peninsula with 90 minutes left to cook. The Red Team's poor navigation cost them valuable time with less than one hour left when they arrived, but they made up time fast in preparation and had their dish of Turkey Club with Roast Vegetable Crisps ready first. However, the Blue Team's Chicken Club with Roast Tomatoes won the day for its flavour punch and Red was sent into elimination.	719,000	17th	40th
33/07-4	17 July 2013	Pressure Test 2 The losing members of the Red Team faced a Pressure Test set by Daniel Wilson of restaurant Huxtable. With two hours on the clock they had to recreate his signature dish of Maple Glazed Bacon Hot Dog, with Comte & Dijon Sauce, Tomato & Quince Relish & Mustard Pickles in a Pork Brioche Bun. What looked like a simple dish at first had many contestants confounded at its actual difficulty, which included making brioche and sausages from scratch. The pressure of time and delicate nature of bringing together all the components got to most contestants, but Rishi again showed the judges his skill with the dish of the day. In the end, it came down to Samira (whose religious beliefs meant she couldn't taste most of her dish's elements) and Kelty (whilst his dish had many technical flaws, he had perfectly made the brioche). Kelty was saved and Samira eliminated.	747,000	11th	37th
34/07-5	18 July 2013	MasterClass 7		> 20th	> 40th
Week 8 (Second Chance Week)
35/08-1	21 July 2013	Second Chance Challenge 1 With the Top 10 safe from elimination for the week and an immunity pin up for grabs, the contestants first competed in a skills test: crushing a Chinese five-spice mix in a mortar and pestle. Christina was the slowest to finish and lost her chance at immunity for the week. In the second round, nine of the twelve eliminated contestants returned to cook for their place back in the competition. Paired up randomly (Rishi & Samira, Kelty & Jules, Lynton & Lilliana, Daniel & Pip, Emma & Faiza, Vern & Nicky, Neha & Xavier, Lucy & Michael, Noelene & Dan), their challenge was to take a pair of ingredients (a protein and a classically Chinese accompaniment) and create a Chinese dish in 60 minutes. The worst two dishes would lose their makers a shot at immunity (for the Top 10) or a spot back in the competition. Vern, Nicky, Neha, Xavier, Noelene and Dan were praised for their excellent cooking and teamwork, while Rishi, Samira, Emma, Faiza, Lucy and Michael found themselves in the bottom three. Ultimately, Rishi & Samira were declared safe, eliminating Faiza and Michael from the competition a second time.	773,000	14th	35th
36/08-2	22 July 2013	Second Chance Challenge 2 The remaining seven teams of two competed in a test of planning, synchronicity and communication: without seeing or tasting each other's food they had to produce exactly the same dish. Dishes were judged on their similarities in taste and presentation, with the least identical losing their makers the chance at immunity or a place back in the competition. Being unable to work collaboratively with their partner caused some key missteps in a number of teams, with the smallest difference in preparation (such as the type of blender used) leading to big differences in final product. Ultimately, Pip and Daniel paid the price for not using their planning time efficiently (after disagreeing on their dish's initial direction) and although the judges declared Pip's dish one of the best, Daniel's proved too dissimilar and they fell out of the running for the week's reward.	824,000	14th	30th
37/08-3	23 July 2013	Second Chance Challenge 3 The twelve remaining contestants faced a three-hour Pressure Test set by owner of Gelato Messina, Nick Palumbo: a Black Forest Gelato Cake known as The Dome. With pairs working together in teams of four, each member had 45 minutes (plus changeover time to pass on information) to prepare the various precise elements while working in a cold store at -2 degrees Celsius. The Blue Team, headed by Neha (with Nicky, Vern and Xavier) fell behind early but recovered brilliantly to almost perfectly replicate the dish, wowing the judges. Both the Red (Noelene, Dan, Kelty and Jules) and Yellow Teams (Rishi, Samira, Lynton and Lilliana) struggled with their Spiced Chocolate Gelato layer, ensuring it set correctly. But in the end it came down to taste and because Red's Kirsch Semifreddo had separated and their overall taste wasn't as good as Yellow's, Noelene, Dan, Kelty and Jules dropped out on the running for the week's prize.	844,000	12th	29th
38/08-4	24 July 2013	Second Chance Challenge 4 The final challenge of Second Chance Week saw the remaining four teams (Lynton & Lilliana, Neha & Xavier, Rishi & Samira, and Vern & Nicky) compete in an Invention Test with butter as the core ingredient. With 90 minutes on the clock, each pair had to produce one sweet and one savoury dish, the winners receiving either a ticket back into the competition or (for the current contestant) an immunity pin. With so much on the line, teams scrambled to develop dishes which championed butter as an ingredient. Lynton and Nicky struggled to produce the sweet dishes for their teams, and despite Lilliana's dish winning dish of the day and rave reviews from all three judges, Lynton's was judged as the worst and they, as well as Nicky and Vern were declared out of the running. It came down to Neha (whose Poached Quince Flourless Chocolate Tart was praised) & Xavier (who was criticised for playing it safe with a simple steak dish), and Rishi & Samira, and it was the latter team whose dishes, though slightly flawed, were the more inventive, thus giving them the win. Samira won herself a place back in the competition while Rishi won immunity.	737,000	12th	36th
39/08-5	25 July 2013	MasterClass 8	492,000	20th	>40th
Week 9 (Love Week)
40/09-1	28 July 2013	Love Mystery Box Challenge The remaining eleven contestants faced an empty Mystery Box and were tasked with filling it with ingredients they loved, plus one 'hard to love' ingredient. In a further twist, they had to swap boxes with another contestant of their choice (although Rishi was luckily left with his own ingredients), forcing some hasty re-evaluations. This curve ball rattled some contestants, including Vern whose dessert Mystery Box put him out of his comfort zone and landed him in the bottom three. Joining him were Neha (whose Pavlova contained too much cornflour) and Rishi, who despite having the advantage produced a mediocre overcooked pasta dish.	606,000	18th	>40th
41/09-2	29 July 2013	Pressure Test 3 With Rishi choosing to play his immunity pin (only days after he won it), Noelene (as the fourth worst performer from the previous challenge) joined Neha and Vern in a Pressure Test set by Kirsten Tibbles: the Lourous Cake. With an extremely technical, five-page recipe it was crucial to get each stage right. While a misstep with dessert landed him in elimination, Vern impressed with a near flawless dish. And while both Noelene and Neha had some problems in preparation they recovered well to also impress the judges and Tibbles. But it was an unfortunate piece of baking paper left in her cake that was enough to seal Neha's elimination.	684,000	18th	38th
42/09-3	30 July 2013	Date Night Team Challenge The Top 10 contestants faced a team challenge: to cook a main and a dessert for 50 couples on a first date. Complicating matters, each contestant randomly chose a mystery ingredient that had to feature in their dishes, five desirable (such as red wine and figs) and five not usually associated with date night food (such as garlic and sardines). Lucy's Blue Team luckily ended up with four of the five desirable ingredients, leaving Kelty's Red Team to get creative with their less typical date food. While the Blues faced some missteps in prep time (a mistake in ordering their protein set them back significantly), Red had disharmony as team members disagreed with the direction of their dishes. In the end, both teams impressed with their mains and faced disappointment with melted ice cream desserts, but it was Red's shared Meze Platter which showed impressive technique and fit the challenge brief that won them the challenge, sending the entire Blue Team into elimination.	616,000	19th	>40th
43/09-4	31 July 2013	Elimination Challenge 9 After losing in the previous challenge, Lucy, Daniel, Christina, Lynton and Vern faced a breakfast service challenge in Gary Mehigan's restaurant the Maribyrnong Boathouse. Each contestant had to design a modern breakfast dish with 90 minutes of prep time before one hour of service. With this being the first service challenge for most of them (plus Lynton's first elimination challenge), the time constraints and pressure of a commercial kitchen was a steep learning curve. Lynton had to think on his feet as his dish was re-imagined twice during prep, but he recovered well to have one of the most impressive dishes (Daniel's Sweet Potato Croquettes getting dish of the day), and Lucy's muesli, while simple, was praised for being a cleverly chosen, delicious dish. Both Christina and Vern had dishes sent back (Christina both over- and under-cooked her baked eggs, while Vern's smoked trout pizza contained some bones), and found themselves in the bottom two, with Vern the one to leave in a close result.	714,000	14th	35th
44/09-5	1 August 2013	MasterClass 9	591,000	16th	>40th
Week 10 (Heston Blumenthal Week)
45/10-1	4 August 2013	Pressure Test 4 In this episode the contestants were split into three teams - red (Samira, Kelty, Lynton), blue (Lucy, Emma and Noelene) and Yellow (Rishi, Christina and Daniel). The teams were asked to re-create Heston's classic Royal truffle. Noelene and Emma struggled in the blue team.Blue team's base was too runny so it came down to the red and yellow teams. Kelty misread the recipe and didn't add enough gelatine to the jellies.Finally yellow team won the challenge as all their components were perfect.The winning team gets a shot at immunity.	705,000	13th	35th
46/10-2	5 August 2013	Immunity Challenge 3 The winning team from last night's pressure test gets a shot at immunity. Each contestant gets 90 minutes to cook a starter (Daniel), main course (Christina) and dessert (Rishi). Heston gets 90 minutes to cook all the three courses. It was a blind tasting. Daniel had the entree and eggs, Christina had main and wine, and Rishi had dessert and milk.Daniel and Christina's course were on par with Heston's and it came to very tiny details. Rishi's dessert was a disaster. Heston's dish was declared a winner in all three courses, so none of the contestants won the immunity pin. However, it was Daniel who was adjudged the best among the three contestants, so he gets to skip the next challenge and goes directly to the top 8.	827,000	11th	27th
47/10-3	6 August 2013	Offsite Challenge 4 The contestants were split into two teams- Blue (Rishi, Kelty, Samira and Noelene) and Red (Lynton, Lucy, Emma and Christina). The challenge was to prepare a medieval feast, which included a range of poultry and game birds along with Heston's garden (herb garden with some garnishes). Team blue captured the essence of medieval theme when compared to the red team and all their dishes were cooked to perfection; however blue team lost the challenge as their turkey was raw and the judges couldn't taste it. Red team won the challenge and blue team was put into elimination.	803,000	11th	31st
48/10-4	7 August 2013	Elimination Challenge 10 The Elimination Challenge required contestants to 'Hestonise' a dish of their choice with innovation in technique and use of ingredients. Drawing on their experiences during the week, all four managed to exceed expectations with their dishes. Rishi plated sweet Indian-Chinese dumplings with a soy sauce caramel and dry ice tea; Kelty offered up a deconstructed hot toddy with liquid nitrogen frozen ice-cream at the table; Samira changed her initial idea of a volcano to serve Znoud al-Sett (sweet Middle-Eastern rolls) with the flavours echoed in a rose and orange blossom scented dry ice sheesha prelude. Noelene, who served curried fish heads with clumsily frozen curry 'jellies', was eliminated. It was announced to the contestants that the following week, they would travel to Dubai for an international food experience, with Christina and Daniel earning business class tickets as a reward for their performances in Heston week.	933,000	8th	20th
49/10-5	8 August 2013	MasterClass 10	764,000	10th	32nd
Week 11 (World Food Week)
50/11-1	11 August 2013	Dubai Team Challenge On Day 1 of World Food Week, the top 8 contestants paired off to cook local for 36 Emirati VIP guests in the Dubai desert with Michelin-starred Greg Malouf mentoring and judging their platters. The teams were assigned proteins with their pick of team colour: Rishi and Christina (Yellow) received fish, Lynton and Lucy (Green) camel, Kelty and Samira (Red) lamb, and Daniel and Emma (Blue), chicken. In a budget of 600 dirham, the teams sourced their ingredients from the local market and then travelled by camel to the cooksite at Al-Waha. All pairs overcame problems faced in the cooking process (unfamiliar ovens, mistaken and 'misplaced' ingredients) to plate up and impress the guests and judges, but Blue's chicken platter was declared the standout leader for its innovative and 'perfect' selection of dishes, including chicken cooked two ways, a pilaf, an array of dips, and rose-and-halva accented watermelon. With the remaining three pairs facing elimination, Daniel and Emma won themselves first-class tickets to Paris for a culinary walking tour with Matt Preston.	699,000	13th	
51/11-2	12 August 2013	Elimination Challenge 11 The bottom six were tasked with taking over service at Ossiano Restaurant at Atlantis, The Palm, cooking for 50 VIP guests. The menu comprised a selection of high-quality entrees, mains and desserts, from which the contestants picked their dish in the order assigned them after drawing coins from a 'treasure chest'. Lynton picked the beef tenderloin main due to his familiarity with the ingredient, but struggled through prep and failed to prepare and serve the beef cheek croquette element of his dish. Christina, choosing the crab entree, also failed to use her prep time efficiently but recovered to plate up all the required components of her dish, but was faulted for having been too heavy-handed with her mashed potatoes. Samira did well with her quail entree, and Kelty and Lucy, both having picked desserts, also received generous praise. Despite getting the last pick and the prep-heavy fish main, Rishi impressed the judges with his prep and execution of the dish. Christina and Lynton were chosen as the worst of the best, but on account of the general quality of the cooking and service from all contestants and the unprecedented degree of disagreement among the judges regarding the elimination, it was revealed that neither would be sent home.	734,000	15th	
52/11-3	13 August 2013	Offsite Challenge 5 The Top 8 were tasked with cooking and delivering takeaway lunch orders to office workers scattered around Melbourne CBD. Each team had to cook one entree and two mains with accompanying sides. The teams and the cuisine they had to cook were determined by picking a flag at random, with the blues getting Mexican and the reds getting Chinese. The first orders were to start calling in 90 minutes into the challenge leaving each team 2 hours to deliver the food. Once in the kitchen the blues nominated Christina to be captain while Emma captained the reds. Once preparation started, each team questioned the number of people they must prep for and both estimated for 100. This turned out to be a major challenge for both teams with the blue team needing to double their portions of their soft shell tacos with less than 10 minutes before the first orders came through and the red team having to shrink their portions of prawn wontons from three to two in order to have time to finish them. Once the first orders came through, both teams struggled to pack the food, manage the phone and prep for future orders. Despite this the blue team managed to send Rishi & Lynton off with their first delivery well before the red team. Once the red team sent off Emma & Lucy to deliver their first order, they got lost and fell even further behind the blue team. Upon returning for the second order the blue team decided to re-plate their tacos upon complaints from some of the customers, which turned out to be a success with the customers the second time round. Once the reds returned for their second order they realised Samira had added up the number of wontons incorrectly for the second order and were forced to leave without them. In the end the judges decided which team had won based upon performance in the kitchen, the deliveries and the taste of their food. The faults for the blue team were the inconsistencies in the plating with the tacos, while the red team's beef dish "lacked flavour and authenticity" as well as some customers not receiving their wontons. In the end the red team was sent into elimination due to this key flaw.	776,000	11th	
53/11-4	14 August 2013	Elimination Challenge 12 The losing team from the previous challenge were faced with a two-round elimination using a map of the world in food. With Emma opting to use her immunity pin, Samira, Daniel & Lucy were faced with the task of cooking a single dish in 45 minutes using only ingredients from one continent. Daniel & Samira chose Australia and Africa respectively to play to their strengths, while Lucy chose Asia because she believed it was quick despite it being an unfamiliar cuisine for her. Overall all three of the contestants struggled, especially Lucy & Daniel (Lucy failing to plate up her crab which was the highlight of her dish and Daniel's only positive being that his scallops were "cooked nice"). Samira was pronounced safe from the second round and won the opportunity to choose the continent both Lucy and Daniel must cook with in the second round. Samira chose North America because she believed that it was the only continent that would give both contestants a fair chance. Lucy and Daniel then had 1 hour to produce a dish with that continent. Daniel opted to revolutionise the smoked salmon and cream cheese bagel, while Lucy did an Eton Mess. Both contestants struggled with the unfamiliar cuisine and both put up dishes that were criticized but were "line-ball" in tasting. It came down to the plating of the dish. Lucy's dish was plated well while Daniel was criticized on his "clumsy and old fashioned" plating. As this was the deciding factor, Daniel was eliminated	923,000	10th	
54/11-5	15 August 2013	MasterClass 11	614,000	17th	
Week 12 (Dreams Week)
55/12-1	18 August 2013	Service Challenge The seven remaining contestants began to realize that their food dreams are a real possibility. They were asked to create dinner for some very special guests which in the end was revealed to be their families. Everyone presented delicious dishes but it was Emma's dish that was declared as the "Dish of the Day", thereby granting her safety from tomorrow's elimination.	671,000	14th	
56/12-2	19 August 2013	Elimination Challenge 13 Christina's dish was named "Dish of the Day" for her new interpretation on a classic Caesar Salad. For elimination, it came down to Lucy and Kelty. While Lucy presented a trio of cupcakes with some flaws, it was Kelty who was eliminated for the overly thick molasses glaze on his dish's pork shoulder.	742,000	13th	
57/12-3	20 August 2013	Josie Bones Series 1 second runner up Chris Badenoch opened his restaurant, Josie Bones, to the red and blue teams to serve a lunch service to regular customers.	808,000	11th	
58/12-4	21 August 2013	Elimination Challenge 14 Darren Purchese and Series 4 contestant Kylie Millar gave a task to Lucy, Rishi and Samira to recreate Darren's intricate raspberry, rhubarb, chocolate and ginger dish, made of 13 individual recipes. Rishi was praised for the quality of the dish but missed the ginger element. Samira also earned praises but was criticised for the textures of her domes and jelly. In the end, it was Lucy's technical issues with her buns and poor presentation that lost her place in the Finals, therefore eliminating her.	807,000	9th	
59/12-5	22 August 2013	MasterClass 12	610,000	16th	
Week 13 (Finals Week)
60/13-1	25 August 2013	Finals Week Mystery Box Challenge The top five each get to pick an ingredient for the last Mystery Box Challenge. They picked Chili Chocolate (Christina), Chilli (Rishi), Espresso coffee beans (Emma), garlic (Lynton) and Pomegranate molasses (Samira). While the judges gave the ingredients to each contestant: Emma has kale, Samira with nuts, Rishi with prawns, Christina with onions and Lynton with kangaroo. They have 60 minutes to cook their dishes with their ingredients. Emma again won the advantage for the Invention Test. She chose barramundi (over rib eye beef, duck and squid) with 60 minutes to cook. After having critical flaws in their first dishes, Christina and Samira redeemed themselves as the Top 2 and it was the latter's complexity of flavours that won her the advantage for tomorrow's elimination.	716,000	12th	
61/13-2	26 August 2013	Elimination Challenge 15 Each top five contestant were assigned with one chef to cook their dishes in 90 minutes to survive from elimination. Their mentors (Adam Da Silva, Ryan Flaherty, Matt Germanchis, Jason Jones and Matt Stone) have fifteen minutes to assist the contestants in their dishes. Lynton is paired with Flaherty and cooked a Sous Vide Lamb Rack dish. Christina and chef Stone prep a cauliflower soup. Rishi and Da Silva cooked a Mughlai Spatchcock. Emma and Germanchis made a Buttered John Dory. After winning last night's challenge, Samira got extra five minutes to cook her dish. She and chef Jones cooked their Stuffed Roasted Spatchcock. Emma, Samira and Lynton had overall positive reviews from the judges and they were safe while the final decision came to Rishi and Christina's dishes. Ultimately, the lack of creativity and simplicity in her dish isn't enough for Christina to advance, sending her home.	811,000	12th	
62/13-3	27 August 2013	Finals Week Service challenge Its service challenge in The Atlantic restaurant with Donovan Cook running the pass. All contestant had problems in the kitchen and struggled to keep up. Emma had the most problems in prep time (in some point even broke to tears) but served stand out entrée (king fish capraccio), but step back with her main scalops dish, which was good but not great (serving to judges some raw scalops). Rishi had great prep time and good tuna entrée, but struggled with risotto. Samira's crab entrée lacked a bit of punch and had trouble with snapper sticking to grill but in the end the snapper was cooked beautifully. Lynton's bug entrée put him behind as it was cook to order and lack flavour and he didn't impress with main either. Rishi and Samira rose to the top with Rishi winning the advantage in the next challenge.	814,000	11th	
63/13-4	28 August 2013	Elimination Challenge 16 Emma won the first round against Rishi. The cuisine was Indian and the protein was mussels. Lynton won the second round against Samira. He picked kangaroo as the protein when Samira picked Middle Eastern cuisine. The final round began to see who would join Emma and Lynton in the Grand Final. Cuisine was French and protein was the eye fillet. Both the remaining contestants were comfortable with what they landed with, but made a mistake while executing the dish. Rishi forgot to blanch his leeks before char-grilling them, and Samira garnished her French dish with coriander leaves. The judges had a difficult time deciding whether Samira's choice of coriander as garnish not being French or Rishi's ashy leek sauce was the worst mistake. Rishi, one of the favourites to win the contest, went home one step away from the Grand Final. Emma, Samira and Lynton are the Masterchef 2013 Grand Finalists.	910,000	7th	
64/13-5	29 August 2013	MasterClass 13	666,000	16th	
Week 14 (Grand Finale)
65/14-1	1 September 2013	Grand Finale Emma, Lynton and Samira cook off in the Grand Finale in three challenges.: Entrée – The grand finalists had to create a perfect dish and they were able to practice before the cook. Samira's confit salmon tarator earned high praise on the presentation but judges' opinions split on the need of the remoulade. Lynton didn't receive any negative feedback on his beef eye fillet that highly impressed the judges whom they named it as the dish of the day. Emma served her roast chicken with black truffles that also impress the judges. Samira scored 26, Emma also scored 26 and Lynton scored a perfect 30 (10 points each from the judges).; Main – Their next challenge was to serve a main dish that featured chicken as the core ingredient to be served to 20 guests in their "dream restaurant" with three hours of prep time. The finalists who had the lowest score would be eliminated in third place. Emma's chicken gratin with salt crust potato did not mind the judges as it contained the bones in her plate as the meat was cooked perfectly but they noted the salt crust being a bit tough. Lynton's barbecue sambal chicken impress the judges but was criticised as the dish did not feature the core ingredient of the challenge. Samira's spiced chicken breast with pumpkin puree was condemned by the judges for the cold puree despite having the meat cooked perfectly. Samira got 22 points, Lynton received a 21 and Emma had 23 points. Samira finished in third with the final score of 48 while Emma's total score was 49 and Lynton got 51 points total.; Dessert – Emma and Lynton pit each other in the last round to recreate "Plight of the Bees", a 700-layered honeycomb dessert contained a meringue, a lemon thyme honey cream, thyme ice, and cooked pumpkin with fresh fruit and herbs made by chef Ben Shewry of Attica restaurant. While Lynton's dish received praise on the flavours and the cooking of the pumpkin, his construction of the dish was flat while his pumpkin was too thick, his curd was grainy and missed out the crunch. Emma also had a problem with her presentation while she missed the granita and the tear in her pumpkin disappoint the judges but they praise for the textures of her other elements. Lynton got 30 points while Emma got 36 with the tally of the final scores of 81 to Lynton and 85 to Emma out of 100.	921,000	8th	
65/14-1	1 September 2013	The Winner Announced - Emma was named the winner of MasterChef Australia 2013. She won $100,000, a cookbook deal, an Alfa Romeo Giulietta car, and professional apprenticeship in the Australian restaurants. Lynton received $20,000 and Samira earned $10,000 after finishing in third place.	1,057,000	5th	

Preceded by MasterChef Australia: The Professionals	MasterChef Australia series 5; 2 June 2013 – 1 September 2013	Succeeded by MasterChef Australia (series 6)
