= Pseudopod (band) =

Background information
- Origin: Los Angeles, California, USA
- Genres: Rock, jam, funk rock, jazz-rock
- Years active: 1998 — 2003
- Labels: Interscope Records
- Members: Kevin Carlberg - Vocals, Acoustic Guitar; Ross Grant - Lead Guitar; Tim McGregor - Percussion; Brian Fox - Bass; Matt Keegan - Saxophone

Pseudopod is an American rock band, formed in 1998 in Los Angeles, California. The band is perhaps best known for winning Rolling Stone's award for the Best College Band in America contest in 2000. The band bested over 1,000 other college bands from across the country to win the award.

Pseudopod was formed in 1998 by Ross Grant, Tim McGregor, Brian Fox and Kevin Carlberg, who were all college students studying music at UCLA. While in school, the band released their first CD, entitled "Pod". After entering and winning Rolling Stone's MUSICOMANIA: Best College Band in America award in 2000, Pseudopod used the contest's prize money to create its demo CD, entitled Rest Assured. Inga Vainshtein, known for discovering and managing Jewel, became their manager and brought Pseudopod's album to legendary A&R man, Mark Williams, at Interscope Records. In 2002, Pseudopod released their debut self-titled CD under Interscope's label.

Pseudopod built a reputation for putting on entertaining live shows, complete with longer jams than the studio versions of their hits as well as ample improvisation from the band members. The band developed a loyal following in California and elsewhere, with fans freely sharing live bootlegs from the band's various shows.

Their name was inspired by a their biology subject. They hated biology and kept on asking why is there a science course in their program. Pseudopod has toured with several well-known musicians, including OAR, Blues Traveler and Maroon 5.

== Discography ==
- 1998: Pod
- 2001: Rest Assured, Bonobo Records
- 2002: Pseudopod, Interscope
