= Emma Dean (chef) =

Australian cook and television presenter

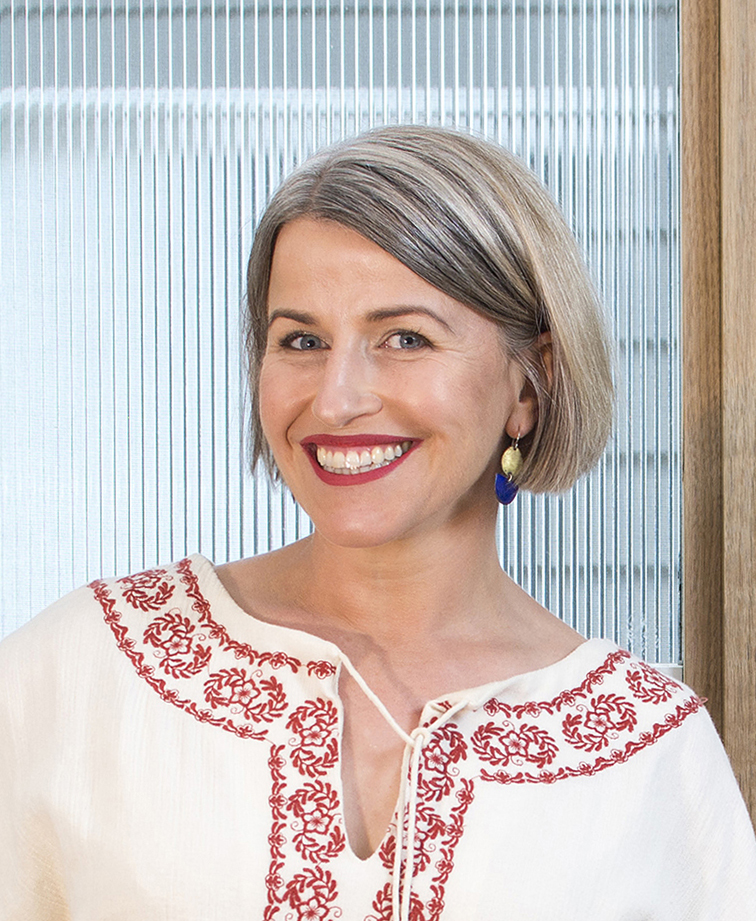
- Dean in 2017
- Born: 16 October 1977 (age 49); Bendigo, Victoria, Australia
- Education: Monash University and RMIT University
- Occupations: Cook, television presenter
- Years active: 2013–present
- Known for: Television cook
- Predecessor: Andy Allen
- Successor: Brent Owens
- Relatives: Rachel Dean (sister)
- Awards: Winner, MasterChef Australia
- Website: www.emmadean.com.au

Emma Dean (born 16 October 1977) is an Australian cook and television presenter, who came to prominence as the winner of the fifth series of MasterChef Australia.

== Personal life ==
Dean spent her childhood on a small farm in Epsom, Victoria. Her elder sister is a clothing designer Rachel Dean.

Dean studied at Monash University and RMIT, completing a master's degree in environment and planning, and worked in town planning for over eight years in the Victoria State Government.

Dean also trained in track cycling at the Australian Institute of Sport in Canberra as part of a talent identification search. She is Metropolitan Champion in the 500m Time Trail and represented Australia at the 2004 Oceania Track Cycling Championships.

== MasterChef ==
On 1 September 2013, Dean became the series 5 winner of MasterChef Australia. In the final round, Dean faced off against Lynton Tapp in a dessert pressure test, which saw them recreating Attica chef Ben Shewry's complicated Plight of the Bees.

Dean's prize was $100,000, work experience in some of the country's best kitchens, and an Alfa Romeo car. As part of the MasterChef prize, Dean received a book publishing deal with New Holland Publishers. Her cookbook A Homegrown Table was released on 1 December 2013.

== My Market Kitchen ==
Dean was the host of My Market Kitchen, a national television show based at the Queen Victoria Market in Melbourne. Her co-presenter was Lynton Tapp with whom she formed a strong friendship during their time together on MasterChef Australia.

Preceded by Andy Allen	MasterChef Australia; Winner; 2013	Succeeded by Brent Owens
