= Andy Allen (chef) =

Australian cook (born 1988)

- Born: Andrew Peter Allen; 30 April 1988 (age 38); Maitland, New South Wales, Australia
- Occupations: Television cook; television presenter
- Predecessor: Kate Bracks
- Successor: Emma Dean
- Spouse: Alexandra Davey (m. 2022)
- Children: 1
- Website: andyallen.com.au

Andrew Peter Allen (born 30 April 1988) is an Australian cook and television presenter. He is most notable for winning the fourth season of MasterChef Australia in 2012. Since 2020, he has been a judge on the show.

== Early life ==
Allen was originally an electrician by occupation. He was also a basketball player with the Maitland Mustangs. and also volunteered to work on extensions to his local basketball stadium.

Allen's father, Peter, was a teacher at Bolwarra Public School, and was also the primary cricket convenor for the NSW Primary Schools Sports Association, while his mother was also a teacher at East Maitland Primary School respectively.

== Career ==
Andy pursued a career in the hospitality industry. He now co-owns a restaurant, Three Blue Ducks, that has five locations around Australia, in Rosebery, Byron Bay, Nimbo and Bellingen in New South Wales, as well as Melbourne in Victoria. In 2018 his restaurant was awarded a Chef's Hat, making Andy the first MasterChef Australia contestant to be awarded the highly sought-after honour.

In 2021, he appeared as a co-host in Three Blue Ducks, a cooking show based that travels throughout Australia to find inspiration for new dishes that appear on the permanent restaurant menu.

=== MasterChef Australia ===
Allen won the fourth season of MasterChef Australia in 2012. After making it to the final, Allen beat fellow finalists Audra Morrice and Julia Taylor in a three-way contest. Facing only Taylor for the final two rounds, Allen won with a score of 76 to Taylor's 68.

Allen appeared in an episode of MasterChef Australia All-Stars in August 2012.

He returned in the eleventh season as a professional Secret Chef, and lost to Sandeep Pandit by a perfect score, 30, in an Immunity Pin Challenge. His score was kept secret, but was revealed on Facebook to be 24.

In October 2019, he was announced as one of three of the new MasterChef judges who replaced George Calombaris, Gary Mehigan and Matt Preston.

In May 2023, he was a pallbearer for Jock Zonfrillo with Lauren Zonfrillo.

== Personal life ==
Allen became engaged in May 2020 and married his wife Alex Davey on 8 October 2022. Their son was born on 13 April 2026.

Preceded by Kate Bracks	MasterChef Australia; Winner; 2012	Succeeded by Emma Dean
