= Brent Owens =

Australian cook (born 1989)

- Born: 23 August 1989 (age 37); Melbourne, Victoria, Australia
- Occupation: Reality television cook
- Years active: 2014–present
- Known for: MasterChef Australia
- Predecessor: Emma Dean
- Successor: Billie McKay
- Partner: Madison Ancrum
- Awards: Winner, MasterChef Australia

Brent Owens (born 23 August 1989) is an Australian cook. He is the winner of the sixth series of MasterChef Australia. He gave $50,000 of his $250,000 prize money to fellow contestant Emelia Jackson. He wrote a cook book, Dig In!, for people who come home tired at the end of the day to make a stellar dish with minimal effort. He lives in Melton, Melbourne.

Owens worked as a bobcat driver for Ancrum's father's excavation business from age 18 until he bought a house at age 19. He played Australian rules football for the Melton South Football Club in the Ballarat Football League.

After working as a cook, Owens left Australia to pursue a career in biotechnology. He is studying life science at Harvard University and is the co-founder of Vitrafy, a biotech company.
