= Bungalo Records =

- Parent company: Universal Music Group
- Founded: 2000
- Founder: Paul Ring
- Distributor: Universal Music Group
- Genre: Various
- Country of origin: United States

Bungalo Records is a record label and distribution company, distributed by Universal Music Group. Bungalo Records was formed in 2000 and has been with Universal Music Group for over 20 years. Bungalo Records has distributed artists such as Patti LaBelle, La Toya Jackson and Carl Thomas.

== Artists ==
- Chingy
- Janet Jackson
- La Toya Jackson
- Patti LaBelle
- Maddi Madd
- CeCe Peniston
- Carl Thomas
- The Stick People
