= MasterChef Australia series 13 =

Australian television series season

MasterChef Australia
- Season 13
- Judges: Andy Allen; Melissa Leong; Jock Zonfrillo
- No. of contestants: 24
- Winner: Justin Narayan
- Runner-up: Pete Campbell
- No. of episodes: 61

Release
- Original network: Network 10
- Original release: 19 April – 13 July 2021

Additional information
- Filming dates: 2 December 2020

Series chronology
- ← Previous; Series 12 Next → Series 14

The thirteenth series of the Australian cooking game show MasterChef Australia premiered on 19 April 2021 on Network 10. Andy Allen, Melissa Leong, and Jock Zonfrillo returned to the show as judges from the previous season.

Applications for contestants for the 13th series of MasterChef Australia were open between April and August 2020.

== Changes ==
Only three Immunity Pins were up for grabs this season, which all 24 contestants competed for during the first Mystery Box challenge. In addition to being exempt from the first Elimination Challenge, the holders of the Immunity Pins were able to use them at any point during future Elimination Challenges, including right up to the end of a challenge.

The Second Chance Challenge returned as Second Chance Week, with two eliminated contestants being given the chance to return instead of one.

This season featured three finalists in the Grand Finale instead of two.

== Contestants ==
=== Top 24 ===
The Top 24 contestants were announced on 19–20 April 2021.

| Contestant | Age | State/Terr | Occupation | Status |
|---|---|---|---|---|
| Justin Narayan | 27 | WA | Youth pastor | Winner 13 July |
| Pete Campbell | 36 | NSW | Tattoo artist | Runner-up 13 July |
| Kishwar Chowdhury | 38 | VIC | Printing business owner | Third place 13 July |
| Elise Pulbrook | 28 | VIC | Lawyer | Eliminated 11 July |
| Linda Dalrymple | 38 | NSW | Stay-at-home mum | Eliminated 6 July |
| Sabina Newton | 21 | TAS | Commerce student | Eliminated 5 July |
| Tommy Pham | 31 | NSW | Kindergarten teacher | Eliminated 4 July |
| Depinder Chhibber | 29 | NSW | Pharmacist | Eliminated 29 June |
| Scott Bagnell | 40 | QLD | Commercial interior designer | Eliminated 27 June |
| Minoli De Silva | 34 | NT | Chemical engineer | Re-eliminated 27 June; Returned 1 June; Eliminated 2 May |
| Aaron Sanders | 34 | SA | Insurance claims manager | Eliminated 20 June |
| Maja Veit | 33 | WA | Small business owner | Re-eliminated 15 June; Returned 3 June; Eliminated 4 May |
| Brent Draper | 31 | QLD | Boilermaker | Withdrew 13 June |
| Amir Manoly | 30 | VIC | Construction project manager | Eliminated 8 June |
| Dan Dumbrell | 31 | NSW | Research project officer | Eliminated 6 June |
| Tom Levick | 24 | NSW | Law graduate | Eliminated 30 May |
| Eric Mao | 21 | NSW | Medical student | Eliminated 25 May |
| Jess Hodge | 36 | NSW | Landscape architect | Eliminated 23 May |
| Conor Curran | 27 | VIC | Restaurant manager | Eliminated 16 May |
| Therese Lum | 31 | NSW | Performance data analyst | Eliminated 11 May |
| Wynona Davies | 27 | NSW | Marketing coordinator | Eliminated 9 May |
| Katrina Dunnett | 25 | VIC | Marketing coordinator | Eliminated 27 April |
| YoYo Yang | 19 | SA | Medical student | Eliminated 25 April |
| Trent Vu | 23 | VIC | Marketing executive | Eliminated 22 April |

Future Appearances

- In Series 14 Tommy Pham and Minoli De Silva appeared for another chance to win the title. Minoli was eliminated on 17 May 2022, finishing 18th and Tommy was eliminated on 19 June 2022, finishing 10th.
- Depinder Chhibber appeared as a guest Judge on MasterChef India Season 7.
- In Series 15 Brent Draper appeared again and won the title.
- In Series 16 Kishwar Chowdhury, Amir Manoly and Connor Curran appeared as guests for the 1st service challenge.
- Depinder along with Pete appeared on Series 17. Pete withdrew from the competition on 30 April 2025, finishing 24th and Depinder was eliminated on 4 August 2025, finishing 4th.
- Therese later competed in the 2026 revival of MasterChef Asia, alongside alumnus Khanh Ong. She is eliminated on 5 November 2026, finishing 6th while Ong was eliminated on 12 November 2026 alongside UK series 16 runner-up Sandy Tang, tied in 4th place.

== Guest chefs ==
| Week | Guest | Challenge |
|---|---|---|
| 1 | Emelia Jackson | Mystery Box Challenge |
| 2 (Superstars Week) | Nigella Lawson | Pressure Test & Elimination Challenge |
| 2 (Superstars Week) | Yotam Ottolenghi | Team Challenge |
| 2 (Superstars Week) | Massimo Bottura | Elimination Challenge |
| 2 (Superstars Week) | Clare Smyth | Mystery Box Challenge |
| 2 (Superstars Week) | Heston Blumenthal | Immunity Challenge |
| 2 (Superstars Week) | Poh Ling Yeow | Elimination Challenge |
| 2 (Superstars Week) | Callum Hann | Elimination Challenge |
| 2 (Superstars Week) | Reynold Poernomo | Elimination Challenge |
| 3 (Learning Week) | Laura Sharrad | Masterclass |
| 4 (Masters Week) | Andreas Papadakis | Team Challenge |
| 4 (Masters Week) | Kirsten Tibballs | Pressure Test |
| 4 (Masters Week) | Masahiko Yomoda | Mystery Box Challenge |
| 4 (Masters Week) | Scott Pickett | Immunity Challenge |
| 4 (Masters Week) | Curtis Stone | Elimination Challenge |
| 5 (Service Brigade Week) | Frank Camorra | Immunity Challenge |
| 5 (Service Brigade Week) | Adam D'Sylva | Immunity Challenge |
| 5 (Service Brigade Week) | Jenna North | Immunity Challenge |
| 5 (Service Brigade Week) | Jason Staudt | Immunity Challenge |
| 6 | Clinton McIver | Pressure Test |
| 7 (Second Chance Week) | Anthony Hart | Pressure Test |
| 7 (Second Chance Week) | Josh Niland | Elimination Challenge |
| 8 (Victorian Culinary Road Tour) | Alla Wolf-Tasker | Elimination Challenge |
| 8 (Victorian Culinary Road Tour) | Kate Reid | Immunity Challenge |
| 9 | Khanh Nguyen | Pressure Test |
| 9 | Nick Holloway | Elimination Challenge |
| 10 | Darren Purchese | Pressure Test |
| 10 | Curtis Stone | Immunity Challenge |
| 10 | Nornie Bero | MasterClass |
| 11 | Rayleen Brown | Elimination Challenge |
| Finals | Martin Benn | Elimination Challenge |
| Finals | Hugh Allen | Pressure Test |
| Finals | Peter Gilmore | Grand finale |

== Elimination Chart ==
| No. | Week | 1 | | 2 | | | 3 | | 4 | | 5 | 6 | | 7 | 8 | | 9 | | 10 | | 11 | | 12 | | | Finals |
|---|---|---|---|---|---|---|---|---|---|---|---|---|---|---|---|---|---|---|---|---|---|---|---|---|---|---|
| No. | Mystery Box Challenge Winner | Elise; Therese; Wynona (Immunity Pin) | | Aaron; Conor; Depinder; Linda; Pete | | | Conor; Dan; Depinder; Kishwar; Therese | | Depinder; Jess; Pete; Scott | | None | Dan; Elise; Kishwar; Linda; Pete | | Eric; Maja; Tom; Wynona | Depinder; Kishwar; Linda; Tommy | | Depinder; Justin; Pete; Tommy | | Kishwar; Sabina | | Elise; Justin; Linda | | None | | | Pete |
| No. | Immunity Challenge Winner | Elise; Therese; Wynona (Immunity Pin) | | Pete | | | Depinder | | Depinder | | None | Linda | | None | Tommy | | Justin | | Sabina | | Linda | | Pete | | | None |
| 1 | Justin | Top 24 | Top 3 | IN | Team 2nd | IN | Team 2nd | IN | Team Lose | Btm 4 | Btm 8 | IN | IN | Top 8 | Top 6 | Top 6 | Team Win | IMM | Btm 8 | Top 5 | Team Win | Top 3 | Top 4 | Top 3 | Btm 3 | WINNER |
| 2 | Pete | Top 24 | IN | IN | Btm 4 | IMM | Team 2nd | Top 4 | Team 3rd | IN | Btm 8 | Top 4 | Btm 5 | Btm 3 | Top 4 | Top 6 | Team Lose | Btm 5 | Btm 8 | Top 5 | Team Lose | Btm 3 | Top 4 | Top 3 | ADV | Runner-up |
| 3 | Kishwar | Top 24 | IN | IN | Team Win | Top 3 | Btm 3 | Top 4 | Team 2nd | IN | Top 8 | IN | Btm 5 | Btm 7 | Top 4 | Top 6 | Team Win | Top 5 | Btm 8 | Top 5 | Team Lose | Top 3 | Top 4 | Top 3 | Btm 3 | Third-place |
| 4 | Elise | Top 24 | IMM | IN | Team Win | Btm 20/Imm. | Team Win | IN | Team 2nd | IN | Top 8 | IN | IN | Top 8 | IN | Btm 6 | Team 2nd | Top 5 | WIN | ADV | Team Win | Btm 2 | Top 4 | Btm 2 | 4th | Eliminated (Ep 59) |
| 5 | Linda | Top 24 | Btm 5 | Top 2 | Team Lose | IN | Team 2nd | IN | Team 3rd | IN | Top 8 | IN | IMM | Btm 7 | Btm 4 | Top 6 | Team 2nd | Top 5 | Btm 8 | Btm 2 | Team Win | IMM | Btm 2 | Elim | Eliminated (Ep 57) | |
| 6 | Sabina | Top 24 | IN | IN | Team 2nd | IN | Btm 3 | IN | Team Win | IN | Btm 8 | Btm 4 | IN | Top 8 | Btm 4 | Btm 6 | Team 2nd | Top 5 | IMM | | Team Win | Top 3 | Elim | Eliminated (Ep 56) | | |
| 7 | Tommy | Top 24 | IN | Top 2 | Team Win | Btm 4 | Team 2nd | Top 4 | Team 2nd | IN | Btm 4 | Top 4 | Btm 5 | Top 8 | Top 4 | IMM | Team Lose | Top 5 | Btm 8 | Top 5 | Team Lose | Elim | Eliminated (Ep 55) | | | |
| 8 | Depinder | Top 24 | Top 3 | IN | Team 2nd | IN | Team Win | IMM | Team Win | IMM | Top 8 | Top 4 | IN | Top 8 | Top 6 | Top 6 | Btm 2 | Btm 2 | Btm 2 | Top 5 | Elim | Eliminated (Ep 52) | | | | |
| 9 | Scott | Top 24 | IN | IN | Team Win | Top 3 | Team Win | IN | Team 2nd | IN | Btm 4 | Btm 4 | IN | Top 8 | IN | Btm 6 | Team 2nd | Btm 5 | Btm 8 | Elim | Eliminated (Ep 50) | | | | | |
| 10 | Minoli | Top 24 | IN | IN | Team 2nd | Elim | Eliminated (Ep 10) | | | | | | | Btm 7 | Btm 4 | Top 6 | Team Win | Btm 5 | Elim | Re-eliminated (Ep 50) | | | | | | |
| 11 | Aaron | Top 24 | IN | IN | Team Lose | Top 3 | Team 2nd | IN | Team 2nd | IN | Top 8 | IN | Btm 5 | Top 8 | IN | Btm 6 | Team Win | Elim | Eliminated (Ep 45) | | | | | | | |
| 12 | Maja | Top 24 | IN | Btm 5 | Team Win | Btm 4 | Elim | Eliminated (Ep 12) | | | | | | Btm 7 | Top 4 | Btm 6 | Elim | Re-eliminated (Ep 42) | | | | | | | | |
| 13 | Brent | Top 24 | IN | Btm 5 | Team 2nd | IN | DNP | IN | Team Lose | IN | Top 8 | Btm 4 | IN | Top 8 | IN | Quit | Withdrew (Ep 40) | | | | | | | | | |
| 14 | Amir | Top 24 | Btm 5 | IN | Team Win | IN | Team Win | IN | Team 3rd | Btm 4 | Btm 8 | IN | IN | Btm 3 | Elim | Eliminated (Ep 37) | | | | | | | | | | |
| 15 | Dan | Top 24 | Btm 5 | Btm 6 | Btm 2 | IN | Team 2nd | Btm 4 | Btm 2 | Btm 4 | Btm 4 | IN | IN | Elim | Eliminated (Ep 35) | | | | | | | | | | | |
| 16 | Tom | Top 24 | IN | Btm 5 | Btm 4 | IN | Team Win | IN | Team 3rd | IN | Top 8 | Top 4 | Elim | Eliminated (Ep 30) | | | | | | | | | | | | |
| 17 | Eric | Top 24 | Top 3 | IN | Team Win | IN | Team Lose | Btm 4 | Team 3rd | IN | Top 8 | Elim | Eliminated (Ep 27) | | | | | | | | | | | | | |
| 18 | Jess | Top 24 | IN | IN | Team Win | IN | Team 2nd | Btm 4 | Team 3rd | IN | Elim | Eliminated (Ep 25) | | | | | | | | | | | | | | |
| 19 | Conor | Top 24 | IN | Btm 5 | Team 2nd | Btm 4 | Team Lose | Top 4 | Team Win | Elim | Eliminated (Ep 20) | | | | | | | | | | | | | | | |
| 20 | Therese | Top 24 | IMM | IN | Team Lose | IN | Team Lose | IN | Elim | Eliminated (Ep 17) | | | | | | | | | | | | | | | | |
| 21 | Wynona | Top 24 | IMM | IN | Team 2nd | Btm 20/Imm. | Team Win | Elim | Eliminated (Ep 15) | | | | | | | | | | | | | | | | | |
| 22 | Katrina | Top 24 | IN | IN | Elim | Eliminated (Ep 7) | | | | | | | | | | | | | | | | | | | | |
| 23 | Yo Yo | Top 24 | Btm 5 | Elim | Eliminated (Ep 5) | | | | | | | | | | | | | | | | | | | | | |
| 24 | Trent | Top 24 | Elim | Eliminated (Ep 4) | | | | | | | | | | | | | | | | | | | | | | |
| | Eliminated | | Trent | YoYo | Katrina | Minoli; 1st Elimination | Maja; 1st Elimination | Wynona | Therese | Conor | Jess | Eric | Tom | Dan | Amir | Brent | Maja; Re-elimination | Aaron | Minoli; Re-elimination | Scott | Depinder | Tommy | Sabina | Linda | Elise | Kishwar; 114 points |
| | Eliminated | | Trent | YoYo | Katrina | Minoli; 1st Elimination | Maja; 1st Elimination | Wynona | Therese | Conor | Jess | Eric | Tom | Dan | Amir | Brent | Maja; Re-elimination | Aaron | Minoli; Re-elimination | Scott | Depinder | Tommy | Sabina | Linda | Elise | Pete; 124 points |
| | Eliminated | | Trent | YoYo | Katrina | Minoli; 1st Elimination | Maja; 1st Elimination | Wynona | Therese | Conor | Jess | Eric | Tom | Dan | Amir | Brent | Maja; Re-elimination | Aaron | Minoli; Re-elimination | Scott | Depinder | Tommy | Sabina | Linda | Elise | Justin; 125 points (win) |

== Episodes and ratings ==
Colour key:
– Highest rating during the series
– Lowest rating during the series

| Ep#/Wk-Ep# | Original airdate | Episode title / event | Total viewers (five metro cities) | Nightly ranking | Ref. |
Week 1
| 1/01-1 | Monday, 19 April 2021 | Series Premiere: Auditions Part 1 — The thirteenth series auditions introduced the applicants cooking their signature dish within 75 minutes to secure entry to the Top 24. Nineteen contestants received aprons with three "yes" votes from the judges and sixteen second-chance contestants, with one or two "yes" votes, were given the opportunity to cook again in the second audition for the five remaining spots. | 670,000 | 8 | |
| 2/01-2 | Tuesday, 20 April 2021 | Auditions Part 2 — The hopefuls chose between one of two pantries: to cook a dish in 90 minutes with less ingredients or 45 minutes with more ingredients, to secure one of the five remaining places in the Top 24. The top five dishes were produced by Aaron, Wynona, Katrina and Elise (choosing ingredients from the big pantry), and Conor (who chose from the small pantry). | 582,000 | 8 | |
| 3/01-3 | Wednesday, 21 April 2021 | Top 24 Mystery Box Challenge — Emelia Jackson, the winner of season 12, returned to set a mystery box challenge for the Top 24 to cook in 75 minutes to win one of three immunity pins. Therese, Elise and Wynona were the Top 3, and they won the immunity pins with their chocolate Sichuan ice cream with pistachio, quail with ricotta and silverbeet, and pistachio ice cream with cherry granita and saltbush, respectively, as well as exemption from the next elimination challenge. | 549,000 | 10 | |
| 4/01-4 | Thursday, 22 April 2021 | Chicken and Egg Elimination Challenge — A two-round elimination challenge tasked the remaining 21 contestants with highlighting either a chicken or an egg, with the bottom five having 75 minutes to make another dish with the other ingredient. Depinder, Eric and Justin's dishes were praised, while Amir, Dan, Linda, Trent and YoYo served flawed dishes and were sent to the second round. Trent's chicken dish was overpowered with too much lemon myrtle, and with the four other dishes winning over the judges, it was Trent who found himself at the bottom, and the first contestant eliminated from the competition. | 591,000 | 8 | |
Week 2 Superstars Week
| 5/02-1 | Sunday, 25 April 2021 | Cryptic Elimination Challenge: Nigella Lawson's Toasted Marshmallow and Rhubarb Cake — Nigella Lawson set the 23 contestants' next elimination challenge, in which they had to identify eighteen biscuit flavours; the five cooks with the fewest correct answers were sent to the second round. Brent, Conor, Maja, Tom and YoYo had to decipher Nigella's detailed description of her dish, a marshmallow and rhubarb cake, inspired by her cookbook Cook, Eat, Repeat, and had 90 minutes to recreate it. Brent delivered the dish of the day, with Tom, Maja and Conor also declared safe, but YoYo's cake was off: the meringue was under-whipped and the rhubarb was underbaked, forcing her out of the competition. | 527,000 | 8 | |
| 6/02-2 | Monday, 26 April 2021 | Flavour Combinations Team Challenge — In their first team challenge, contestants were tasked by Yotam Ottolenghi with creating a three-course meal highlighting three of his flavour combinations: numbing oil, chipotle peanuts and fenugreek marinade. Aaron, Conor and Elise, the captains of the grey, orange and brown teams, respectively, led the first groups of three cooks to draft each course in thirty minutes before the remaining three cooks finished the meal. In the tasting, the brown team served a thawed dessert, while the orange team had a poor element in their main. However, both teams were saved after the grey team served overcooked chicken skewers and an unnecessary element in their dessert, which sent them to elimination. | 545,000 | 14 | |
| 7/02-3 | Tuesday, 27 April 2021 | Cheese and Bread Elimination Challenge — Massimo Bottura gave the losing team members 60 minutes to make their take on mac 'n' cheese, with the three best dishes declared safe. Dan, Katrina, Pete and Tom were sent to the second round, in which they had 75 minutes to make a dish featuring bread. Tom and Pete stood out with their bread desserts, while Dan also impressed with his savoury bread dish. Katrina opted to bake an orange bread and butter pudding with crème anglaise and almond crumb. While it was quite delicious, she failed to highlight the key ingredient because of the flavours of orange and raisins actually dominated throughout the entire dish. Overall, the judges felt that Katrina had missed the brief and she was the third contestant to be eliminated. | 603,000 | 11 | |
| 8/02-4 | Wednesday, 28 April 2021 | Clare Smyth's Michelin Mystery Box Challenge — In the Mystery Box Challenge, the contestants had 75 minutes to make a dish using ingredients selected by Clare Smyth: scampi, peas, wasabi, brandy, lemon, chives, tomatoes and rose geranium, inspired by one of her dishes. Aaron's lasagna, Depinder's bombe Alaska, Conor's koulourakia, Linda's tortellini and Pete's scampi with tomato tartare were the top five dishes and won the opportunity to compete for immunity. | 535,000 | 13 | |
| 9/02-5 | Thursday, 29 April 2021 | Breakfast Ice Cream Immunity Challenge — Heston Blumenthal set an immunity challenge for Aaron, Conor, Depinder, Linda and Pete, in which they had 75 minutes to make an ice cream dessert highlighting one of five traditional breakfast ingredients: avocado for Depinder, bacon for Pete, corn flakes for Aaron, tea for Linda and Vegemite for Conor. Although Depinder's avocado ice cream received rave reviews, it was Pete that won immunity with his clever use of bacon in his savoury ice cream dish. | 570,000 | 7 | |
| 10/02-6 | Sunday, 2 May 2021 | Restaurant Dish Elimination Challenge — The contestants had 90 minutes to make a dish that could be featured on the menu of the restaurant of one of three returning MasterChef alumni: Poh Ling Yeow, Callum Hann, and Reynold Poernomo. During the last 30 seconds, Elise and Wynona played their immunity pins, while Aaron, Kishwar and Scott stood out as the Top 3. Minoli, Conor, Maja and Tommy all had issues with their dishes and were named the bottom 4. Attempting to cook a sous vide steak with yuzu gel, Minoli scrapped the first dish and replaced it with a sesame crusted steak dish with yuzu dressing and pickled radish. The dish lacked clarity and the imbalance of flavours overpowered the steak. Conor's tiramisu cake was dry, Maja's fresh strawberry mille feuille was disjointed and Tommy's salmon was overcooked. At the end of the day, the goal of this challenge was about designing a dish that will fit on the menu of Poh's, Callum's or Reynold's, make whatever that dish is delicious and most importantly executing perfectly. The judges agreed that while the bottom 4 dishes missed one or two of those goals today, only Minoli's dish failed to meet all 3 goals. As a result, Minoli became the fourth contestant to be eliminated. | 592,000 | 5 | |
Week 3 Learning Week
| 11/03-1 | Monday, 3 May 2021 | Six Course Meal Race Team Challenge — Brent was exposed to a COVID-19 hot spot and was stood down for six days. Therefore, he was sent to next week's pressure test. Each member of three teams had to cook one dish of a six-course meal within the time allocated: 8 minutes for mayonnaise, a fish dish in 15 minutes, 30 minutes for a steak meal, a pasta dish in 45 minutes, a curry in 60 minutes and 75 minutes for dessert. The blue team won with three points for the pasta, the curry and the dessert while the green team scored two points for the mayonnaise and the steak. The purple team only scored one point for the fish dish and they were sent to the pressure test. | 607,000 | 11 | |
| 12/03-2 | Tuesday, 4 May 2021 | Jock Zonfrillo's Two Tart Pressure Test — Conor, Eric, Kishwar, Maja, Sabina and Therese had three hours to recreate one of Jock Zonfrillo's two tarts: his savoury yabby curry tart or his sweet chocolate ginger salted caramel tart. Therese, Conor and Eric all succeeded, while Kishwar, Sabina and Maja failed to get their tart shells out in time and faced elimination. But it was Maja's burnt crumb and underbalanced caramel that sealed her elimination. | 517,000 | 13 | |
| 13/03-3 | Wednesday, 5 May 2021 | Staple Ingredient Box Challenge — The remaining contestants had 75 minutes to make a dish using the staple ingredients and two ingredients from the garden. Therese, Conor, Depinder, Kishwar and Dan made the five best dishes and advanced to the immunity challenge while Sabina received special mention for her ricotta doughnuts. | 535,000 | 12 | |
| 14/03-4 | Thursday, 6 May 2021 | Hidden Pairs Immunity Challenge — Conor, Dan, Depinder, Kishwar and Therese had to pick an ingredient of their choice next to a cloche that contained a hidden paired ingredient and make a dish in 75 minutes. Depinder had mangoes and chili for her fried chicken, Kishwar got mint and beetroot to cook a Middle Eastern feast, Therese paired corn with blue cheese and made an ice cream sandwich, Conor delivered a dessert with coffee and cherries, and Dan got figs and licorice to make a panna cotta. Beating Dan, it was Depinder's dish that won her immunity. | 522,000 | 7 | |
| 14/03-4 | Thursday, 6 May 2021 | MasterClass: Andy Allen, Laura Sharrad and Jock Zonfrillo — Season 12 runner-up Laura Sharrad joined Andy and Jock for the contestants' first MasterClass at the Flemington Racecourse: Andy presented his salt baked beetroot with smoked hollandaise, Laura cooked pumpkin ricotta ravioli and Jock made his eucalyptus-smoked mashed potato. | 308,000 | 18 | |
| 15/03-5 | Sunday, 9 May 2021 | Food Expressions Elimination Challenge — The contestants had 90 minutes to cook a dish interpreting one of three food quotes: "bring home the bacon", "cool as a cucumber" and "the proof is in the pudding". Pete, Conor, Tommy and Kishwar stood out with their dishes. Eric faltered in the execution of his carbonara while Dan, Jess and Wynona missed the brief of highlighting the cucumber. Overall, Wynona's execution of her dish did not meet the standards the judges had expected, which made her the sixth contestant to depart the competition. | 567,000 | 5 | |
Week 4 Masters Week
| 16/04-1 | Monday, 10 May 2021 | Pasta Team Challenge — In a pasta-themed team challenge set by chef Andreas Papadakis, the contestants were split into six teams of three and given 75 minutes to prep and serve a three-course meal. The blue team, consisting of Conor, Depinder and Sabina, delivered a pumpkin and taleggio pansotti, hilopites with salmonglio and strawberry rhubarb sorbet, all which won overall praise, while the grey, red and green teams' meals were also applauded. Although the brown team's dishes did not meet the mark, it was the pink team's inconsistent linguine that sent them to the pressure test, alongside Brent, who avoided the previous elimination challenge due to COVID quarantine. | 623,000 | 10 | |
| 17/04-2 | Tuesday, 11 May 2021 | Pressure Test: Kirsten Tibballs' Three Chocolate Desserts — Brent, Dan, Justin and Therese had three hours and fifty minutes to recreate three of Kirsten Tibballs's chocolate dishes: her exotique mousse cake, strawberry rebellion lollipops and ruby financier. Choosing not to use her immunity pin, Therese struggled to temper her chocolate while she missed the second stencil of the cake and failed to glaze it at the end of the cook. Her lollipops were dense and her chocolate was too thick. Therese became the third contestant to be eliminated while still holding on to the immunity pin. | 573,000 | 9 | |
| 18/04-3 | Wednesday, 12 May 2021 | Bento Box Challenge — The 17 contestants had 90 minutes to make their own take on a bento box, after receiving demonstrations from Michelin-starred chef Masahiko Yomoda, with the best bento boxes named the Top 4. The four contestants who stood out were Depinder, Pete, Scott and Jess, and they advanced to the immunity challenge. | 513,000 | 13 | |
| 19/04-4 | Thursday, 13 May 2021 | Fire Immunity Challenge — Depinder, Jess, Pete and Scott competed in an immunity challenge, set by restaurateur Scott Pickett, in which they had 75 minutes to cook a dish with fire. Jess cooked carne asada tacos, Scott made a coffee-cured trout and Pete grilled his wagyu beef with potato, but it was Depinder who won her second immunity challenge with her tandoori chicken. | 572,000 | 7 | |
| 20/04-5 | Sunday, 16 May 2021 | Butchery Elimination Challenge — Curtis Stone set a two-round elimination challenge for the contestants centered on butchery cuts of beef. The first round was an auction challenge where the contestants were grouped in pairs and given 100 minutes of cooking time to bid for a cut of beef and cook a meal with two side dishes in the remaining time. Sabina and Linda presented massaman curry with the gravy beef in 100 minutes, Jess and Scott made a grilled oyster blade meal in 49 minutes, Tom and Elise finished their 90-minute meal with short ribs, Kishwar and Pete cooked with tenderloin in 65 minutes, Aaron and Eric cooked the blade in 73 minutes, and Brent and Tommy made their scotch fillet meal in 59 minutes. Amir, Conor, Dan and Justin were sent to the second round, in which they had 75 minutes to cook. In the tasting, the judges were impressed with Justin's sweet potato tacos while Dan's duck bao buns was praised. Amir's falafels were delicious but the dish was rushed. The judges thought Conor delivered with his green olive ice cream with revani. However, the texture of his ice cream was grainy. As a result, he is eliminated from the competition. | 586,000 | 6 | |
Week 5 Service Brigade Week
| 21/05-1 | Monday, 17 May 2021 | Service Brigade Immunity Challenge: Tonka — Every challenge this week was a three-course service challenge where remaining contestants competed with one of four Melbourne chef teams to win immunity from Sunday's elimination challenge. The first group, consisting of Depinder, Elise, Eric and Linda cooked against Adam D'Sylva's team from Tonka where each team had two hours to cook a three-course meal in different cuisines. The cuisines selected were Mexican for the entrée, Indian for the main, and French for the dessert. Both teams had technical flaws in their entrées with the pink team impressing with their ceviche while Adam's team scored one point for their dessert, but Depinder's prawn ghee roast stood out to earn her team the win for immunity. | 574,000 | 13 | |
| 22/05-2 | Tuesday, 18 May 2021 | Service Brigade Immunity Challenge: MoVida — Dan, Jess, Scott and Tommy competed against MoVida's Frank Camorra and his team to secure immunity. The featured ingredients were lemongrass for the entree, Jerusalem artichoke for the main and kumquats for the dessert. Jess's team struggled in the prep time to produce their dishes, failing to highlight the lemongrass in their carpaccio and plated a flawed puree during service. Compared to the chefs' entree and main dishes, they lost the challenge despite winning praise for their dessert. | 561,000 | 10 | |
| 23/05-3 | Wednesday, 19 May 2021 | Service Brigade Immunity Challenge: Lucy Liu — Aaron, Brent, Kishwar and Tom competed for immunity against Jenna North and her crew from Lucy Liu Kitchen and Bar. The chefs chose the Eastern pantry, leaving the red team led by Brent with the European pantry. Both teams stood out with their mains, but both had technical flaws in their desserts, and while the flavours of the chefs' dessert stood out, the red team's entree paired with their main impressed the judges and secured their win from elimination. | 557,000 | 11 | |
| 24/05-4 | Thursday, 20 May 2021 | Service Brigade Immunity Challenge: Stokehouse — The four remaining contestants competed for immunity against the chefs of Stokehouse to be safe from elimination. Sabina, Pete, Justin and Amir selected the colour green for their dessert while executive chef Jason Staudt and his team chose red for their entree and yellow for their mains. The turquoise team, led by Sabina, impressed with their red prawn entree but the puree in their main lacked acidity. The chefs' beef tartare entree had technical issues, but they were applauded for their main and dessert, and they won the challenge. | 567,000 | 6 | |
| 25/05-5 | Sunday, 23 May 2021 | Team Relay Elimination Challenge — The green and turquoise teams competed in the first round of the elimination challenge. The captains, who chose savoury, started the first leg of a team relay challenge and had to highlight apples in their dishes in the 80-minute cook. Sabina, Justin, Pete and Amir were safe with their pork and apple dish and Jess, Tommy, Dan and Scott were sent to the second round, in which they had 75 minutes to make a dessert also featuring apples. When the judges tasted their dishes, Dan's frozen apple dessert was applauded while Tommy delivered on his apple tao'er but Scott's apple cheesecake lacked flavour. Jess' dessert, however, lacked clarity from her other elements in flavour and saw her sent home. She became the ninth contestant eliminated from the competition. | 541,000 | 8 | |
Week 6
| 26/06-1 | Monday, 24 May 2021 | Vegetables Invention Test — The fifteen contestants had to highlight one of five vegetables: broccoli, carrot, onion, potato and zucchini to cook an inventive dish in 75 minutes. Tom, Tommy, Pete and Depinder delivered creativity in their dishes as the top four. On the other hand, Scott's potato dessert was dense, Brent's carrot dish missed the brief, Sabina's dish had technical errors and Eric's carrot balls were greasy. The four of them were sent to the pressure test as a result. | 603,000 | 11 | |
| 27/06-2 | Tuesday, 25 May 2021 | Blind Taste Pressure Test: Clinton McIver's Aged Lamb with Native Spiced Butter and Flowering Legumes — Clinton McIver's pressure test challenged Brent, Eric, Sabina and Scott to blind taste his lamb dish and re-create it in three hours. Sabina's dish received overall praise from the judges. Brent received praise for the cooking of his lamb but his dish lacked acidity. Scott also impressed with his lamb but his onion gel was grainy. Eric's lamb was raw and he had cut the fat from the meat. In the end, it was those errors which sent Eric home. He became the tenth contestant eliminated from the competition. | 549,000 | 14 | |
| 28/06-3 | Wednesday, 26 May 2021 | Utensil Box Challenge — The top fourteen contestants had to cook a dish in 75 minutes using only eleven household kitchen utensils. The top five dishes securing immunity were Dan's octopus with cucumber salad, Elise's melanzana with gremolata, Pete's lamb and turnips, Linda's pun seen with nam jeow, and Kishwar's eggplant vorta, niramish with khichri. Mentions went to Sabina and Tommy who also impressed with their dishes. | 561,000 | 13 | |
| 29/06-4 | Thursday, 27 May 2021 | Chili Immunity Challenge — Dan, Elise, Kishwar, Linda and Pete drew numbers to select their blind choice of one of the eight hottest chilis and cook it in 75 minutes. Dan got the bhut jolokia to pair his chocolate ice cream, Pete and Elise had the hurt berry and lemon blast, respectively, to cook their pasta dishes with, Linda chose the God stopper to make her salad and dressing with her eye fillet, and Kishwar used the chocolate Trinidad scorpion for her crab curry. It was Linda's salad and dressing that stood out and won her immunity. | 557,000 | 8 | |
| 30/06-5 | Sunday, 30 May 2021 | Elimination Challenge: Game Meats — The contestants had to identify fourteen game meats in the first round. Tom, who had the fewest correct answers, found himself in the second round alongside Aaron, Kishwar, Pete and Tommy. The bottom five had to feature one of the meats in their dishes in 75 minutes. Tom came undone choosing to cook crocodile with fennel, beurre blanc and tarragon oil, Pete's dish was underseasoned, while the others impressed during tasting. The judges agreed Tom took a risk with a versatile ingredient; when they tasted his dish, the fennel was good but the crocodile was undercooked. Therefore, he was eliminated. | 624,000 | 7 | |
Week 7 Second Chance Week
| 31/07-1 | Monday, 31 May 2021 | Second Chance Cook-Off — The eleven eliminated contestants returned to compete for two places and reinstatement to the Top 15. Each returning contestant chose one of the current thirteen contestants to shop for an ingredient with which they had to cook their dishes in 75 minutes, with the four best dishes advancing to the next round. Conor used lemon to pair with his octopus dish, Katrina presented her piña colada dessert with mint, Eric received pork belly to make his dumpling dish, and Minoli paired chilis with her salmon dish. Those four stood out and advanced to the Pressure Test. The other seven received a second chance later in the week. | 661,000 | 9 | |
| 32/07-2 | Tuesday, 1 June 2021 | Second Chance Pressure Test: Anthony Hart's Chocolate Oasis — Conor, Eric, Katrina and Minoli were given two hours and fifteen minutes to replicate an intricate chocolate tower by pastry chef Anthony Hart to fight for one of the two returning places in the competition. During the tasting, both Katrina and Eric struggled with the tempered chocolate and, while Katrina was applauded for her caramel, Eric's plate had overall flaws. Conor missed the chocolate twigs and his cream was dry. That left Minoli, who delivered a perfect dish that earned overall praise as the judges awarded her place back in the competition. | 557,000 | 13 | |
| 33/07-3 | Wednesday, 2 June 2021 | Second Chance Mystery Box Challenge — The returnees chose between the regular box with eight ingredients or the clear box with four ingredients. The four winning dishes after 75 minutes competed for the last returning slot in the Top 15. The last four contestants advancing for the fifteenth spot were Maja (who used the clear box for her Moreton Bay bug dish), Tom (who used black garlic to make his French dessert), Wynona (who changed the protein to prawns for her overcooked duck), and Eric (who cooked his chive pancakes and omelette with prawns). | 547,0000 | 14 | |
| 34/07-4 | Thursday, 3 June 2021 | Second Chance Three Course Marathon — Eric, Maja, Tom and Wynona competed in two and a half hours to make one dish of a three course meal in each round. Tom's crab tortellini in the entree round had pieces of the shell in the filling while in the main round, Eric's squirrel fish had technical errors, leaving Maja and Wynona in the last round where Maja's intricate splice-inspired dessert beat Wynona's simple orange cake and kaffir lime ice cream, finalizing the Top 15. | 599,000 | 7 | |
| 35/07-5 | Sunday, 6 June 2021 | Three Dishes from One Cod Elimination Challenge — Josh Niland demonstrated the butchering of a Murray cod and utilising each part of the fish to make a three-course meal. The contestants had to do the same across three rounds. Aaron, Brent, Depinder, Elise, Justin, Sabina, Scott, and Tommy succeeded in the first round in 30 minutes while Kishwar, Linda, Maja, and Minoli redeemed in the second after 45 minutes. Amir, Dan, and Pete had one hour to cook with what was left of their cod. Dan had previously faced seven eliminations, but he struggled to choose his remaining cuts for his laksa in the third round of his eighth elimination cook. When the judges tasted his dish, Andy and Josh admitted Dan did not highlight the fish head in his broth while Jock noticed his lack of butchery of the fish. The dish did not meet the brief, and it was the misuse of the cod that undid his work, eliminating him. | 590,000 | 6 | |
Week 8 Victorian Culinary Road Tour
| 36/08-1 | Monday, 7 June 2021 | Apollo Bay Crayfish Team Challenge — This week's challenges took place throughout Victoria. At Apollo Bay, the team challenge tasked the contestants, drafted into pairs, with cooking two dishes featuring crayfish in 75 minutes. The red, purple and turquoise teams delivered with their dishes, with Pete and Kishwar's dishes being declared highlights. The blue team's Linda and Amir failed to extract lobster flavour in their dishes while Sabina and Minoli of the pink team overcooked their crayfish, sending both teams to the elimination challenge. | 615,000 | 9 | |
| 37/08-2 | Tuesday, 8 June 2021 | Daylesford Vegetable Elimination Challenge — Alla Wolf-Tasker set a challenge for Amir, Linda, Minoli, and Sabina at her Dairy Flat Farm in Daylesford where the four had to cook a vegetarian dish in 75 minutes. Sabina decided to pickle her carrots paired with pesto and rye lavosh, Linda opted for a Laotian tomato dish with pickled cucumber, Amir chose the beetroots to make a kebab with tabouleh and labneh, and Minoli cooked a potato and beetroot salad. Amir struggled to cook his beetroots in the last minutes. His concerns were well-founded after the judges tasted his dish. The beetroot was burnt and the texture was flawed, sealing his elimination. | 571,000 | 11 | |
| 38/08-3 | Wednesday, 9 June 2021 | Melbourne CBD Mystery Box Challenge — The thirteen contestants strolled though Melbourne CBD taking photographs to draw inspiration for the dishes they cooked in 75 minutes. The top four dishes were named to compete for immunity - Kishwar made a kingfish ceviche inspired from the water feature of the window at the National Gallery of Victoria, Tommy chose the banh beo, Linda made donuts with iced coffee and Depinder baked a raspberry chocolate choux; all inspired from shops in the laneways of the city. | 532,000 | 13 | |
| 39/08-4 | Thursday, 10 June 2021 | Lune Lab Immunity Challenge — Depinder, Kishwar, Linda and Tommy competed for immunity at Kate Reid's Lune Croissanterie, to bake and fill a prepared pastry in 90 minutes. Kishwar selected the regular croissant with rosewater, Linda picked the vol-au-vent to pair with garlic and mushroom, Depinder chose pastry with a spiced ginger cake and cream, and Tommy filled his Danish with a savoury banh mi. His first time competing in the challenge earned him a win, saving him from Sunday's elimination challenge | 556,000 | 8 | |
| 40/08-5 | Sunday, 13 June 2021 | Cooking Duel Elimination Challenge — The contestants were first split into pairs and went head-to-head against each other in cooking duels. They had 90 minutes for both rounds and had to divide the time they used for each round. Justin, Linda, Depinder, Kishwar, Pete and Minoli all succeeded with their dishes to beat their opponents who were sent to the second round with their remaining cook time. However the challenge didn't commence when Brent, who became overwhelmed after the first round, decided to withdraw from the competition for health reasons, finalising the Top 12. | 558,000 | 7 | |
Week 9
| 41/09-1 | Monday, 14 June 2021 | Deliveroo Pop-up Team Challenge — The top twelve contestants were responsible for running a three-hour service, preparing a three-course meal for delivery throughout Melbourne. Aaron's green team stood out with their Sri Lankan meal, receiving praise from the judges. Scott's orange team also impressed with their Thai duck curry but the beef mince for their phat kaphrao was dry. Unfortunately despite the purple team delivering on their aloo bonda and their lamb chettinad curry, the curry was overpowered by the capsicum which was undercooked, sending Depinder, Pete, Maja and Tommy to the pressure test. | 579,000 | 16 | |
| 42/09-2 | Tuesday, 15 June 2021 | Pressure Test: Khanh Nguyen's Pork Wellington — Depinder, Maja, Pete and Tommy were given four hours and fifteen minutes to recreate a complex pork roll dish with a Vietnamese meatball mix, a pate, and a lattice pork crackling. Pete was first to present his wellington. The crackling was crispy and is loved by the judges. Tommy's wellington also impressed with the cooking of his pork. Depinder's pork was juicy but her pastry was too thick and underbaked while her dressing was too salty. Last to be tasted was Maja whose thick pastry was also underbaked and while the layers are there, the pork was undercooked. With two outstanding dishes from Pete and Tommy, it was between the girls and Maja was eliminated for the second time from the competition. | 563,000 | 12 | |
| 43/09-3 | Wednesday, 16 June 2021 | Barter Mystery Box Challenge — Sabina was unwell and therefore did not participate in the challenge. The other 10 contestants each received four different ingredients they were allowed to swap before cooking in at least 60 minutes. Some boxes additionally contained bonus time cards that contestants could swap along with ingredients. Tommy, Pete and Depinder, who all have previously competed for immunity, were applauded by the judges for their dishes. They joined Justin, who also impressed with his pumpkin dish, to be selected by the judges as the top 4. | 591,000 | 11 | |
| 44/09-4 | Thursday, 17 June 2021 | Unconventional Immunity Challenge — To secure the first place in the Top 10, Depinder, Justin, Pete and Tommy competed in a 45-minute first round where they had to make a dish featuring instant noodles. The winners, Depinder and Justin, were given an open pantry in the second round to cook an unconventional dish in 75 minutes. Justin's inventive cola and potato chip dessert beat Depinder's savoury sriracha ice cream, earning his spot in the Top 10. | 578,000 | 7 | |
| 45/09-5 | Sunday, 20 June 2021 | Nu Nu Menu Tasting Elimination Challenge — Nick Holloway brought three of the dishes from his restaurant for the contestants to taste and identify all 50 ingredients in fifteen minutes. Tommy, Elise, Sabina, Kishwar, and Linda had the most correct guesses and made it to the Top 10 while the bottom five contestants had 75 minutes to make a dish with the ingredients from Nick's three dishes. Minoli chose to cook a Sri Lankan seafood broth with rice balls while improvising to make her coconut milk for her broth. Aaron planned to prep with prawns and was thinking of other elements to pair with his dish. Scott selected the tropical fruits to make his pavlova with grilled pineapple and molasses lime granita. Pete opted to make a savoury curry ice cream with pineapple granita and peanut coconut crumble. Depinder did well with her curry but she strayed from reading the recipe for her gluttinous rice which became thick and claggy. In the tasting, the judges thought Aaron's dish was strange and it stood out as the obvious choice for elimination and as a result, Aaron became the fourteenth person to leave the competition. | 617,000 | 6 | |
Week 10
| 46/10-1 | Monday, 21 June 2021 | Surf and Turf Team Challenge — Andy mentored the ten contestants responsible for serving one entree and two mains to 60 diners at the Three Blue Ducks restaurant. The green team led by Justin was assigned meat while the core ingredient for Elise's blue team was seafood. During prep time, the blue team struggled to prep the proteins and failed to discard the innards of their flounder. | 631,000 | 10 | |
| 47/10-2 | Tuesday, 22 June 2021 | DIY Pressure Test Dish — As the winners of the team challenge, Justin, Kishwar, Linda, Minoli and Tommy competed for two places in the immunity challenge. Darren Purchese mentored the contestants to create their own pressure test dish featuring vanilla in two hours. Minoli made a pineapple tarte tatin, Justin presented his intricate vanilla mousse with lemon curd, and Kishwar delivered her vanilla pepper kulfi with rose granita and pistachio sable. It was Linda's vanilla pond dessert and Tommy's vanilla flan that stood out in the challenge. | 561,000 | 11 | |
| 48/10-3 | Wednesday, 23 June 2021 | Family Box Challenge — The other eight contestants competed for the last two places in the immunity challenge where they took inspiration from their respective families and friends to cook their dishes in 75 minutes. Kishwar's lau chingri and sardine curry with jau bhaat and Sabina's fisherman's stew were the two standout dishes while mentions went to Minoli's lamprais and Pete's peanut butter & jelly dessert. The top two then joined Linda and Tommy to compete for immunity. | 582,000 | 11 | |
| 49/10-4 | Thursday, 24 June 2021 | Immunity Challenge: Keeping up with Curtis Stone — Kishwar, Linda, Sabina and Tommy followed Curtis Stone in replicating his roasted chicken dish. In the tasting, Linda missed out the wings and legs in her dish, Kishwar had a technical flaw in her sauce and Tommy overcooked his chicken oyster. All three had stumbled during the cook while, despite her potato fondant being undercooked, Sabina won overall praise with her dish. As the winner of immunity from the double elimination round, she also earned $10,000 worth of groceries. | 541,000 | 9 | |
| 49/10-4 | Thursday, 24 June 2021 | MasterClass: Andy Allen, Jock Zonfrillo and Nornie Bero — Andy showed the Top 10 contestants his two seafood dishes: scallops with chickpea miso butter, and crab flatbread with picked onions. Jock demonstrated the use of a pressure cooker to make a base jus and consommé. Guest chef Nornie Bero showcased native ingredients in making her banana pakalolo with coconut panna cotta and hibiscus syrup. | 366,000 | 18 | |
| 50/10-5 | Sunday, 27 June 2021 | Black Box and Cloche Elimination Challenge — In this double elimination challenge, the contestants voted to use the mystery box in the first round, and a hidden core ingredient (horseradish) in the second, to cook each dish in sixty minutes. The first round saw Elise's pumpkin agnolotti with brown butter sauce as the top dish, giving her immunity from the second round. Minoli had technical errors with the noodles in her dish and she was the first of the two contestants to be eliminated. Tasked with highlighting horseradish in his dish in the second round, Scott cooked a Dory fillet with horseradish cream and green oil. He struggled with time to prep his fish which was quite firm. While his sauce was velvety and his salad worked well, there was a bland flavour in his horseradish cream and the fish was overcooked, sending him home. | 601,000 | 7 | |
Week 11
| 51/11-1 | Monday, 28 June 2021 | Uluru Team Challenge — At Uluru, the top eight contestants served a three-course meal with indigenous Australian ingredients to 30 diners in two hours. Both teams impressed with their entrees but Justin's yellow team's main was less refined than Pete's orange team's main. However, while the yellow team's dessert was rustic, the orange team's panna cotta that was way too set and way too much gelatin in it. Overall, the judges felt the orange team had missed the brief, with Kishwar, Pete, Tommy and Depinder going to elimination. | 640,000 | 12 | |
| 52/11-2 | Tuesday, 29 June 2021 | Simpsons Gap Elimination Challenge — Indigenous cook Rayleen Brown set a challenge for the orange team at Simpsons Gap in Alice Springs, where they had to create a dish using a variety of bush ingredients in 75 minutes. Taking on Kishwar, Pete and Tommy, Depinder decided to make a technical tomato salad with carpaccio and warrigal green damper. The judges agreed that while it was tasty, they all struggled to identify the flavour of the indigenous ingredients that Rayleen brought today. Overall, the judges felt that Depinder had missed the brief and she was eliminated from the competition. | 610,000 | 11 | |
| 53/11-3 | Wednesday, 30 June 2021 | Everything Box Challenge - The contestants competed in the Mystery Box Challenge for a spot in the last immunity challenge. They had to feature all of the following ingredients: lamb loin, milk, white onion, black pepper, verjuice, blackberries, bay leaves, and purple cauliflower in their dishes in a 75-minute cook. Justin's lamb and cauliflower, Linda's pepper crusted lamb, and Elise's blackberry tortellini won the last chance to compete for immunity. | 616,000 | 10 | |
| 54/11-4 | Thursday, 1 July 2021 | Lucky Dip Immunity Challenge — Elise, Justin and Linda each selected two of sixty cloches to reveal the essential features for their dishes in the 75-minute cook. Linda chose the preserved lemon and lemon verbena to pair with her duck, Elise paired dark chocolate with pistachios to make her dish, and Justin made a grilled sweet dish using his options. The winner of the last immunity challenge was Linda, who advanced to Finals Week. | 583,000 | 10 | |
| 55/11-5 | Sunday, 4 July 2021 | Fast and Fancy Elimination Challenge — Competing for their places in Finals Week, the six contestants other than Linda selected one ingredient to cook with in two rounds. Tasked to cook in the sixty-minute first round with street food dishes as the theme, Tommy chose beef to make his bo la lot but the beef was overcooked, sending him to the second round with Pete and Elise. They had to use their chosen ingredient to make a restaurant quality dish in 75 minutes. It was his inconsistent cooking of the beef that let him down once again while attempting to make his bún bò Huế and found himself facing the judges' final verdict alongside Elise. Despite having a flavoursome broth and a dish that showed technique, Tommy's beef was blue, deeming it inedible. His elimination left six contestants competing in Finals Week – Elise, Justin, Kishwar, Linda, Pete and Sabina. | 633,000 | 6 | |
Week 12 Finals Week
| 56/12-1 | Monday, 5 July 2021 | Society Six-Course Service Challenge — The six finalists arrived at Martin Benn's new restaurant Society to run a two-and a-half-hour service to present a six-course meal featuring Japanese ingredients to twenty diners. For the mains, Pete started with nori seaweed and celeriac, Elise's ingredient for the second course was yuzu, which she used to make a risotto, Justin featured tarragon with lobster for course 3, and Kishwar prepped the fourth course using fig peppercorns, which she paired with quail. All four succeeded in the tastings, but not Sabina and Linda who stumbled with the desserts. Sabina had to make the fifth course with macadamias, opting to prep a sorbet with lemon curd. Linda had miso paste in the sixth and final course and she chose to prep an ice cream with peanut brittle and yuzu syrup. While Linda's Miso Ice Cream was a little soft, Sabina's Macadamia Ice Cream had an unpleasant flavour of raw macadamia. Ultimately, the judges felt that Sabina failed to meet the brief and she was eliminated. | 626,000 | 12 | |
| 57/12-2 | Tuesday, 6 July 2021 | Pressure Test: Hugh Allen's Bottlebrush, Gumnuts and Billy Buttons — Elise, Justin, Kishwar, Linda and Pete had to recreate in three hours and forty-five minutes a versatile dessert consisting of a strawberry gum mousse, carmelised white chocolate mousse, and passionfruit sorbet by executive chef Hugh Allen. Linda's hurdle came during the middle of the cook when she struggled to temper the chocolate for her mousse while mistakenly mixing the wrong colour of her glaze. It was the balance that sent her home, with her strawberry gum mousse earning praise despite the glaze, but the texture of her white chocolate mousse was off and lacked depth of flavour. This left Kishwar, Justin, Pete, and Elise cooking for places in the Grand Finale. | 609,000 | 12 | |
| 58/12-3 | Wednesday, 7 July 2021 | Gemstone Affinity Duel Challenge — The remaining four finalists competed in pairs to make dishes inspired by gemstones in two rounds with the winner of the second round advancing to the finale. Kishwar and Justin cooked dishes inspired by the ruby while Pete and Elise were assigned the emerald to make their dishes. Pete and Kishwar competed in the second round where they had to cook dishes inspired by the pearl. It was Pete's leek and oysters dish that stood out and advanced him to the finale. | 603,000 | 11 | |
| 59/12-4 | Sunday, 11 July 2021 | Semi-Finals: Service Challenge – Elise, Justin and Kishwar prepped a three-course meal in four hours for sixty diners and the judges. Justin made a cauliflower taco, a lamb backstrap dish and a Brie cheese ice cream. Elise used native Australian ingredients in prepping venison and a parsley semifreddo with figs. Kishwar chose a kingfish ceviche for entree, a goat curry for main and a fennel and bay leaf ice cream for dessert. Elise changed the flavour of her ice cream to pistachio when she missed out on chopping the herbs, but as service started, all of her dishes had some issues: her lentils and mushrooms for entree had technical errors. While cooking her main, Elise rushed to prep her venison, however, one of the meats was dry. After the judges tasted her dessert, her pistachio semifreddo was delicious but when they ate it as a whole, the birdseed brittle overpowered that semifreddo that she worked so hard to bring back from disaster. As a result, Elise was eliminated one night short in the Grand Finale, which meant Pete, Kishwar and Justin were the grand finalists. | 688,000 | 5 | |
| 59/12-4 | Sunday, 11 July 2021 | MasterClass: Chefs vs. Contestants - Justin, Kishwar and Pete challenged Andy and Jock to cook a dish featuring butter, picked by Andy for Jock, and tahini, picked by Jock for Andy, in sixty minutes. Jock won but joined Andy in tasting Carolina Reaper chilies for the punishment. The contestants cooked against the chefs, prepping a three course meal featuring anchovies, crab and pineapple, but Andy and Jock won the second cook. | 643,000 | 7 | |
Week 13 Grand Finale Week
| 60/13-1 | Monday, 12 July 2021 | Grand Finale: Part 1 – The two-night finale, consisting of three challenges, saw the Top 3 finalists cooking their entrée and main in the first two rounds. In 75 minutes, Justin, Kishwar and Pete had to make their entrées with the ingredients from the Mystery Box selected by the eight chefs from every previous weekly challenges: duck (Khanh Nguyen), passionfruit (Darren Purchese), saffron mushrooms (Alla Wolf-Tasker), kohlrabi (Nick Holloway), pandan leaves (Kate Reid), King George whiting (Josh Niland), gold chocolate (Kirsten Tibballs), and tomato ponzu (Martin Benn). Pete selected the King George whiting, kohlrabi and mushrooms for his dish which was applauded overall, scoring 9 points from all three judges. Kishwar also chose those ingredients but her fish was dry, earning her 21 points out of 30. Justin chose duck with passionfruit and kohlrabi but his mushrooms were dry, also scoring 21 points. For the mains, the finalists' loved ones randomly selected from two bowls the key ingredient and method of cooking for their dishes. Kishwar impressed with the use of smoking and white soy sauce for her aloo bhorta with smoked rice water & salsa which earned her a total of 30 points while Justin was praised for the use of fusion cooking for his ruby grapefruit with poached fish, scoring him 29 points. Pete, who was given quince and steaming method, stumbled with a score of 25 when one of his quail dishes was raw. With two of the three rounds completed, Pete kept the lead with 53 points to Kishwar's 51 and Justin's 50. | 799,000 | 5 | |
| 61/13-2 | Tuesday, 13 July 2021 | Grand Finale: Part 2 – The finale continues with Peter Gilmore returning to set a two-dish pressure test in five hours for the finalists to earn the additional final score of 40 points for each dish. The savoury dish was a shaved squid with shiitake, garlic sesame aioli, amaranth, sorghum, and custard from Quay restaurant while the dessert from Bennelong was a five-textured chocolate dessert with sherry caramel, prune jam, rice elements and a golden starch dome. Pete, who took the lead on the first day, struggled during the cook to prep his elements, resulting in an unset custard that was slightly overcooked after plating and missed out one element for the dessert while the plating was rushed. Kishwar's dishes impressed overall but despite being able to fix her split butter sauce for the main, its texture lacked balance. Justin's take on the squid dish received overall praise and while he had all the elements for the dessert, his cake was slightly underbaked. Justin thrived, overtaking Pete and Kishwar with a score of 40 points for the savoury dish and 35 points for the dessert. Kishwar's squid dish received 32 points and her dessert 31 points, while Pete's scores were 36 for the main and 35 for dessert. The overall results were 114 points to Kishwar and Pete with 124 points but it was Justin who won out by one point with a total score of 125. | 824,000 | 6 | |
| 61/13-2 | Tuesday, 13 July 2021 | Winner Announced – Justin Narayan was named the thirteenth winner of MasterChef Australia 2021, awarding him the grand prize of $250,000. Pete Campbell, as the runner-up, won $30,000 and Kishwar Chowdhury won $20,000 after finishing in third place. | 931,000 | 5 | |
