= MasterChef Australia series 12 =

Australian television series season

MasterChef Australia: Back to Win
- Season 12
- Judges: Andy Allen; Melissa Leong; Jock Zonfrillo
- No. of contestants: 24
- Winner: Emelia Jackson
- Runner-up: Laura Sharrad
- No. of episodes: 61

Release
- Original network: Network 10
- Original release: 13 April – 20 July 2020

Series chronology
- ← Previous; Series 11 Next → Series 13

The twelfth series of the Australian cooking game show MasterChef Australia, also known as MasterChef: Back to Win and MasterChef Australia: Back to Win, premiered on 13 April 2020 on Network 10. It is the first series to feature series four winner Andy Allen, Melissa Leong and Jock Zonfrillo serving as judges, after the departure of Gary Mehigan, George Calombaris and Matt Preston in the previous season. This series involves former high-achieving contestants from the past eleven series of MasterChef Australia, returning for another chance at the title of 'MasterChef' and a prize of A$250,000.

Applications for contestants for the twelfth series of MasterChef Australia opened in May 2019. However, plans were changed when contestants from previous seasons were brought onboard instead of new contestants.

The competition was won by Emelia Jackson in the grand finale against Laura Sharrad, broadcast on 20 July 2020.

== Changes ==
Gary Mehigan, George Calombaris and Matt Preston departed the show in 2019 and were replaced with new judges Andy Allen, Melissa Leong and Jock Zonfrillo.

In this series, the typical MasterChef weekly format was slightly changed from prior series. Mondays now feature a Team Challenge with the losing team facing Tuesday's Pressure Test elimination. Wednesdays feature a Mystery Box with the best cooks competing in the Immunity Challenge on Thursday, in which one contestant will be granted immunity from the upcoming elimination. All the other contestants then head into the All-In Elimination Challenge on Sunday. In addition, only one Immunity Pin was up for grabs this season; it was awarded to Dani Venn in the first episode of the series. A new format schedule was debuted on 14 June, with the show beginning to air only three nights a week. Mondays featured the Mystery Box, Tuesdays featured the Immunity Challenge, and Sundays featured the All-In Elimination Challenge.

Amidst the COVID-19 pandemic, production of the show continued while following government regulations. This includes the observance of social distancing, having individual plates for each judge during tasting, and the use of gloves when handling ingredients. In addition, the number of crew on set has been reduced by half, and outside challenges and guests have been dialled back. The new measures debuted on 25 May 2020.

Unlike previous seasons, there was no mid-way "second chance" return challenge for eliminated contestants; all eliminated contestants had no chance to return to the season.

== Contestants ==
The 24 returning contestants were announced on 19 February 2020. Other past contestants such as Derek Lau, Sarah Todd, and Alvin Quah were later confirmed to have been invited to compete in the series, but refused for various reasons.

In March 2020, Ben Ungermann suddenly left the series after being arrested in a matter unrelated to the show. His departure was announced on 17 May 2020. Most charges were dropped when Ungermann pleaded guilty to a single count of common law assault, avoiding a criminal conviction.

Contestant	Age	State	Occupation	Original Series	Previous Season Placing	Status
Emelia Jackson	30	VIC	Cake Designer & Chef	Series 6	3rd	Winner 20 July
Laura Sharrad	24	SA	Chef & Restaurateur	Series 6	Runner-up	Runner-up 20 July
Reynold Poernomo	26	NSW	Chef & Restaurateur	Series 7	4th	Third Place 19 July
Callum Hann	30	SA	Restaurateur & Culinary Educator	Series 2 (Note: Callum won the Masterchef: All-Stars mini-series)	Runner-up	Eliminated 14 July
Reece Hignell	30	NSW	Cake Designer & Chef	Series 10	6th	Eliminated 12 July
Poh Ling Yeow	46	SA	Chef, Artist, Actress & TV Presenter	Series 1 (Note: These contestants also competed on the Masterchef: All-Stars mini-series.)	Runner-up	Eliminated 5 July
Tessa Boersma	28	QLD	Chef & Criminal Statistician	Series 11	Runner-up	Eliminated 28 June
Brendan Pang	26	WA	Restaurateur	Series 10	9th	Eliminated 21 June
Khanh Ong	27	VIC	Business Owner & Chef	Series 10	3rd	Eliminated 14 June
Sarah Tiong	29	NSW	Lawyer & Restaurateur	Series 9	6th	Eliminated 9 June
Simon Toohey	33	VIC	Cook & Restaurateur	Series 11	3rd	Eliminated 7 June
Jess Liemantara	22	VIC	Chef	Series 10	4th	Eliminated 31 May
Tracy Collins	44	SA	Restaurateur	Series 6	5th	Eliminated 24 May
Sarah Clare	35	TAS	Restaurateur	Series 10	10th	Eliminated 19 May
Hayden Quinn	33	NSW	TV Presenter & Marine Biologist	Series 3	6th	Eliminated 17 May
Ben Ungermann	36	QLD	Ice Cream Shop Owner & Chef	Series 9	Runner-up	Left 17 May
Amina Elshafei	35	NSW	Paediatric Nurse & Author	Series 4	11th	Eliminated 12 May
Chris Badenoch	52	WA	Business Owner & Restaurateur	Series 1	3rd	Eliminated 10 May
Rose Adam	42	SA	Chef & Café Owner	Series 7	10th	Eliminated 5 May
Dani Venn	34	VIC	Business Owner & Publicist	Series 3	4th	Eliminated 3 May
Harry Foster	25	QLD	Chef	Series 8	3rd	Eliminated 28 April
Ben Milbourne	38	TAS	Restaurateur	Series 4	5th	Eliminated 26 April
Courtney Roulston	39	NSW	Chef	Series 2	5th	Eliminated 21 April
Lynton Tapp	32	VIC	TV Presenter & Chef	Series 5	Runner-up	Eliminated 19 April

Notes

Future Appearances

- Emelia Jackson appeared on the 3rd Junior Series as a guest judge for a Mystery Box Challenge.
- Emelia appeared on the following season as a guest judge for the first Mystery Box challenge. Reynold Poernomo, Callum Hann and Poh Ling Yeow appeared later on as guest judges for an elimination challenge. Laura Sharrad appeared for the first Masterclass as a guest chef.
- Reynold also appeared on Series 14 as a guest judge for a pressure test.
- Poh also appeared on Series 15 as a guest judge for a Mystery Box Challenge. Emelia appeared later on as a guest judge for an elimination challenge.
- Reynold along with Jess Liemantara had competed on the Dessert Masters spin off series. Jess finished third on November 28, 2023 while Reynold was runner up.
- In Series 16 Poh will appear as a judge. Emelia, Laura, Callum & Jess along with Reece Hignell, Tessa Boersma, Khanh Ong and Simon Toohey appeared as guests for the 1st service challenge.
- Emelia and Reece had competed on the second series of Dessert Masters. Reece finished fifth on November 18, 2024 while Emelia was runner up on November 24, 2024.
- Laura and Callum appeared on Series 17 for their 3rd chance to win. Laura won the competition on 12 August 2025, while Callum was runner up for the 2nd time.

=== Allegations of favouritism from viewers ===
Despite the largely positive overall reception, the series has been met with some skepticism from viewers, mostly through social media, concerning the judges' apparent favouritism towards certain contestants. The most prominent instance of this has centered around contestant Laura Sharrad, who worked in judge Jock Zonfrillo's restaurant for two years following her Series 6 appearance, thus sparking concerns that Zonfrillo may therefore be biased towards her. Other criticism has focused largely on Laura's supposed tendency to cook pasta dishes repeatedly, despite the fact that less than half her dishes could be classified as such. The judges' decision to award Weekly Immunity to Laura, rather than Poh, in Episode 50, was met with backlash from viewers, who felt that Poh's effort was evidently superior. Laura spoke out about her controversy, citing the numerous non-pasta dishes she has cooked on the show and claiming that having to cook for her former employer has made the competition harder, rather than easier, for her. Emelia Jackson called the online hate "narrow-minded".

Other accusations have attacked the judges' apparent reluctance to eliminate contestants Poh Ling Yeow and Reynold Poernomo, both of whom are considered fan favourites, and, therefore, beneficial to the show's viewership. Notably, contestant Tessa Boersma’s elimination stirred controversy and prompted allegations of bias towards Reynold. On the other hand, fans of Reynold called the finale "rigged" because Reynold was not in it.

== Guests ==
Week	Guest Chef/Celebrity	Challenge
1 (Gordon Ramsay Week)	Gordon Ramsay	Series Premiere
1 (Gordon Ramsay Week)	Gordon Ramsay	Team Challenge
1 (Gordon Ramsay Week)	Gordon Ramsay	Challenge
1 (Gordon Ramsay Week)	Gordon Ramsay	Immunity Challenge
2	Louis Tikaram	MasterClass
3	Curtis Stone	Immunity Challenge
4 (Suburban Week)	Helly Raichura	Pressure Test
5 (Twists Week)	Darren Purchese	Pressure Test
5 (Twists Week)	Katy Perry	Immunity Challenge
5 (Twists Week)	Jerry Mai	MasterClass
5 (Twists Week)	Michael Weldon	MasterClass
6	Matt Stone	Team Challenge
6	Jo Barrett	Team Challenge
6	Peter Gunn	Pressure Test
6	Shannon Martinez	Mystery Box
6	Josh Niland	Elimination Challenge
7 (Best Dish Week)	Kirsten Tibballs	Immunity Challenge
8 (Heats Week)	Coşkun Uysal	Challenge
9	Benjamin Cooper	Pressure Test
9	Charlie Carrington	Elimination Challenge
12	Phil Wood	Pressure Test
13	Matt Stone	Elimination Challenge
13	Jo Barrett	Elimination Challenge
13	Shannon Martinez	Elimination Challenge
13	Peter Gunn	Elimination Challenge
13	Darren Purchese	Elimination Challenge
13	Kirsten Tibballs	Elimination Challenge
14 (Finals Week)	Gordon Ramsay	Mystery Box
14 (Finals Week)	Martin Benn	Pressure Test

== Elimination chart ==
No.	Week	1			2			3			4			5			6			7			8		9			10		11		12		13		Finals			
No.	Immunity Challenge	Dani (Immunity Pin)	Callum; Lynton; Sarah C.		Ben U. Khanh; Laura; Reynold; Sarah T.			Callum; Jess; Laura; Sarah T.			Amina; Emelia; Tracy			Poh; Reece; Reynold; Sarah T. Simon			Jess; Poh; Reece; Simon			Brendan; Emelia; Khanh; Simon	Brendan; Jess; Khanh; Poh; Reynold		Callum; Khanh; Poh		Emelia; Laura; Poh; Reece			Brendan; Callum; Reece; Tessa		Callum; Laura; Poh		Laura; Poh; Reynold		Callum; Laura; Reynold		Emelia (Advanced to Semi-Final)			
No.	All-In Elimination Winner	Ben M. Brendan; Laura; Simon			Brendan; Reynold; Tessa			Ben U. Reynold; Sarah T. Simon; Tracy			None			Emelia; Jess; Khanh; Reece; Reynold; Simon; Tracy			None			Khanh; Reece; Tessa			Brendan; Emelia; Laura; Poh		Brendan; Tessa			None		Callum; Emelia; Reece		Emelia; Laura		Emelia; Laura		Reynold			
1	Emelia	Top 4	Team Lose	Btm 19	Team 2nd	IN	Btm 18	Team 2nd	IN	Btm 14	Team Lose	Top 3	Btm 17	Team Win	IN	WIN	Team Win	IN	Btm 3	WIN	IMM		IN	Top 4	Team 2nd	Top 2	Team Lose 1	IN	Btm 3	IN	Top 3	IN	Top 2	IN	Top 2	WIN	IMM	Top 2	WINNER
2	Laura	Top 4	Team Lose	Top 4	Team Lose	Top 3	Btm 18	Team Lose	Top 2	Btm 14	Team Lose	IN	Btm 17	Team Lose	IN	Btm 7	Team Lose	IN	Btm 5	Team Lose 2	IN	Btm 7	IN	Top 4	Team Win	Top 3	Btm 2	IN	Btm 7	WIN	IMM	Top 2	Top 2	Top 3	Top 2	IN	Btm 2	Top 2	Runner-up
3	Reynold	Top 2	Team Lose	Btm 19	Team Win	Top 5	Top 3	Team 2nd	IN	Top 5	Team Win	IN	Btm 17	Team Lose	Top 5	WIN	Team Win	IN	Btm 12	Team Lose 2	WIN	IMM	IN	Btm 4	Team 3rd	IN	Team Lose 2	IN	Btm 3	IN	Btm 2	WIN	IMM	WIN	IMM	Top 2	WIN	3rd	Eliminated (Ep 60)
4	Callum	IN	WIN	IMM	Team 2nd	IN	Btm 18	Team Win	Top 4	Btm 2	Team Win	IN	Btm 17	Team Lose	IN	Btm 7	Team Win	IN	Btm 12	Team Lose 1	IN	Btm 5	WIN	IMM	Team 2nd	IN	Team 2nd	Top 2	Btm 7	Top 3	Top 3	Top 4	Btm 3	Top 3	Btm 2	IN	Elim	Eliminated (Ep 59)	
5	Reece	IN	Team Lose	Btm 19	Btm 3	IN	Btm 18	Team 2nd	IN	Btm 14	Btm 4	IN	Btm 17	Team Win	Top 3	WIN	Team Win	Top 4	Btm 3	Team Lose 2	IN	Top 3	IN	Btm 6	Team Lose 1	WIN	IMM	WIN	IMM	IN	Top 3	IN	Btm 3	IN	Elim	Eliminated (Ep 57)			
6	Poh	IN	Team Win	Btm 19	Team 2nd	IN	Btm 18	Team Lose	IN	Btm 14	Btm 3	IN	Btm 17	Btm 3	WIN	IMM	Team Win	Top 2	Btm 12	Team Lose 1	Top 5	Btm 5	Top 2	Top 4	Btm 2	Top 4	Team 2nd	IN	Btm 7	Top 2	Btm 3	Top 3	Elim	Eliminated (Ep 54)					
7	Tessa	IN	Team Win	Btm 19	Team Lose	IN	Top 3	Team Win	IN	Btm 14	Team Lose	IN	Btm 4	Team Win	IN	Btm 7	Team Lose	IN	Btm 12	Team Lose 2	IN	Top 3	IN	Btm 4	Team 3rd	Top 5	Team Win	Top 4	Btm 4	IN	Elim	Eliminated (Ep 51)							
8	Brendan	IN	Team Lose	Top 4	Team Lose	Top 6	Top 3	Team Win	IN	Btm 5	Team Win	IN	Btm 17	Team Win	IN	Btm 7	Team Lose	IN	Btm 12	Team Win	Top 5	Btm 5	IN	Top 4	Team Lose 2	IN	Team Win	Top 4	Elim	Eliminated (Ep 48)									
9	Khanh	IN	Team Win	Btm 19	Team Lose	Top 5	Btm 18	T.L./Safe	IN	Btm 5	Team Win	IN	Btm 17	Team Win	IN	WIN	Team Lose	IN	Btm 5	Team Win	Top 2	Top 3	Top 3	Btm 6	Team Win	IN	Elim	Eliminated (Ep 45)											
10	Sarah T.	IN	Team Win	Btm 19	Team Win	WIN	IMM	Team Lose	Top 4	Top 5	Team Win	IN	Btm 17	Team Win	Top 3	Btm 7	Btm 2	IN	Btm 12	Team Lose 1	IN	Btm 7	IN	Btm 4	Elim	Eliminated (Ep 42)													
11	Simon	IN	Team Win	Top 4	Team Win	IN	Btm 18	Team 2nd	IN	Top 5	Team Lose	IN	Btm 17	Team Win	Top 4	WIN	Team Lose	Top 4	Btm 12	Team Win	IN	Btm 2	IN	Elim	Eliminated (Ep 40)														
12	Jess	IN	Team Lose	Btm 19	Team 2nd	IN	Btm 18	Team Win	WIN	IMM	Team Win	IN	Btm 17	Team Lose	IN	WIN	Team Win	WIN	IMM	Team Lose 1	Top 5	Elim	Eliminated (Ep 35)																
13	Tracy	IN	Team Lose	Btm 19	Team 2nd	IN	Btm 18	Team Win	IN	Top 5	Team Win	Top 2	Btm 4	Team Lose	IN	WIN	Team Win	IN	Elim	Eliminated (Ep 30)																			
14	Sarah C.	IN	Top 3	Btm 19	Team 2nd	IN	Btm 18	Team 2nd	IN	Btm 14	DNP	IN	Btm 17	Team Lose	IN	Btm 2	Elim	Eliminated (Ep 27)																					
15	Hayden	IN	Team Win	Btm 5	Team Win	IN	Btm 18	Btm 2	IN	Btm 5	Team Win	Top 4	Btm 17	Btm 3	IN	Elim	Eliminated (Ep 25)																						
16	Ben U.	IN	Team Win	Btm 19	Btm 3	Top 3	Btm 18	Team Win	IN	Top 5	Btm 3	IN	Btm 4	Team Win	IN	Left	Left (Ep 25)																						
17	Amina	IN	Team Win	Btm 19	Team Win	IN	Btm 18	Team Lose	IN	Btm 14	Team Lose	WIN	IMM	Elim	Eliminated (Ep 22)																								
18	Chris	IN	Team Lose	Btm 5	Team Lose	IN	Btm 18	Team 2nd	IN	Btm 14	Team Win	IN	Elim	Eliminated (Ep 20)																									
19	Rose	IN	Team Win	Btm 2	Team 2nd	IN	Btm 2	Team 2nd	IN	Btm 14	Elim	Eliminated (Ep 17)																											
20	Dani	WIN	Team Lose	Btm 19	Team Win	IN	Btm 18	Team Win	IN	Elim	Eliminated (Ep 15)																												
21	Harry	IN	Team Lose	Btm 19	Team Win	IN	Btm 18	Elim	Eliminated (Ep 12)																														
22	Ben M.	IN	Team Lose	Top 4	Team 2nd	IN	Elim	Eliminated (Ep 10)																															
23	Courtney	IN	Team Lose	Btm 5	Elim	Eliminated (Ep 7)																																	
24	Lynton	IN	Top 3	Elim	Eliminated (Ep 5)																																		
	Eliminated	None	Lynton		Courtney	Ben M.		Harry	Dani		Rose	Chris		Amina	Ben U.		Sarah C.	Tracy		Jess			Simon		Sarah T.	Khanh		Brendan		Tessa		Poh		Reece		Callum		Reynold	Laura
	Eliminated	None	Lynton		Courtney	Ben M.		Harry	Dani		Rose	Chris		Amina	Hayden		Sarah C.	Tracy		Jess			Simon		Sarah T.	Khanh		Brendan		Tessa		Poh		Reece		Callum		Reynold	Emelia (win)

== Episodes and ratings ==
Colour key:
– Highest rating during the series
– Lowest rating during the series

Ep#/Wk-Ep#	Original airdate	Episode Title	Total viewers (five metro cities)	Nightly Ranking	Ref.
Week 1 (Gordon Ramsay Week)
1/01-1	Monday, 13 April 2020	Series Premiere: Finale-Worthy Dish — Gordon Ramsay, guest judge for the week, tasked the contestants with cooking a dish they felt was worthy of the Grand Finale. All the contestants received positive feedback, and Emelia, Dani, Laura and Reynold were named the Top 4. In a close decision, Dani's Sri Lankan crab curry beat Reynold's intricate white chocolate dessert to win her the only immunity pin of the season. Since Dani had won two immunity pins in Season 3, this made Dani the first person in the show's history to win three immunity pins.	1,228,000	3	
2/01-2	Tuesday, 14 April 2020	Gordon Ramsay's Team Service Challenge — Each team had to cook a three-course meal for 60 guests in a service led by Gordon. The judges revealed three main ingredients: black garlic, ginger and potatoes, and challenged the contestants to showcase a different ingredient in each course. The Blue Team, led by Ben M., served a delicious entrée, but their failure in the main course and dessert sent them to the Elimination at the end of the week. The Green Team, led by Amina, were thus declared the winners, and advanced to the next challenge for an opportunity to cook for the single Weekly Immunity spot.	1,094,000	5	
3/01-3	Wednesday, 15 April 2020	Round Robin Relay Challenge — The 12 contestants from the Green Team were split into groups of three to compete in a Round Robin relay-style cook-off, with every member spending 20 minutes each on the entrée, main, and dessert. All four teams received positive feedback, but Sarah C., Lynton and Callum impressed the judges with their indigenous-themed menu, sending the others to join the Weekly Elimination.	1,032,000	5	
4/01-4	Thursday, 16 April 2020	Immunity Challenge: Keeping Up with Gordon — Sarah C., Lynton and Callum had to follow Gordon and replicate his potato-crusted Murray cod served with vegetable minestrone and macadamia purée; they were not given a recipe and had to plate the dish within 10 seconds of Gordon. All three struggled, but Callum produced the best dish, winning him the first Weekly Immunity of the season. Sarah C. and Lynton joined the others in the elimination.	1,065,000	5	
5/01-5	Sunday, 19 April 2020	Gordon Ramsay's 90-Minute All-In Elimination — All contestants aside from Callum had to cook in a two-round elimination challenge, with 90 minutes to split between the two rounds however each saw fit. In the first round, Simon, Laura, Brendan, and Ben M. wowed the judges and were declared safe immediately. Poh took a risk by spending all 90 minutes in the first round, risking elimination if her dish didn't impress, but she too was declared safe. Chris, Courtney, Lynton, Hayden and Rose produced the worst dishes and were sent to the second round, which they had to cook another dish with whatever time they had left from their original 90 minutes. Hayden, Courtney and Chris went on to redeem themselves, and they were declared safe. Rose's eggplant dish was underwhelming, but Lynton's crab was undercooked and the dish lacked balance. Despite an otherwise impressive showing for the week, Lynton became the first contestant to be eliminated.	1,010,000	4	
Week 2
6/02-1	Monday, 20 April 2020	Ultimate BBQ Team Challenge — The remaining 23 contestants were split into three teams, with each team to serve two savoury BBQ dishes and a dessert to 400 people in five hours: two and a half hours for prepping, and two and a half hours for serving. Although the Orange Team, led by Simon, only had seven people (one less than the other teams), they managed to nail every dish and secure the win. The Purple and Yellow Teams, led by Tracy and Laura, respectively, received mixed reviews on their cooking. The Purple Team's donuts were fluffy, but their grilled corn lacked seasoning. The Yellow Team's donuts were delicious, but their meat was not flavourful. In addition, their chicken portions were inconsistent. Due to those downsides, the Yellow Team was sent to the pressure test.	916,000	9	
7/02-2	Tuesday, 21 April 2020	Two-Round Pressure Test: Jock Zonfrillo — Jock set a two-round pressure test for the Yellow Team, centering on dishes served at his restaurant, Orana. In the first round, the contestants had 90 minutes to cook scarlet prawns, riberry crumpets, and bunya nut chawanmushi. Ben U., Courtney and Reece all had technical errors in their prawns and were sent to the second round, in which they had 105 minutes to recreate a damper and pickled kohlrabi salad. Ben U.'s salad received high acclaim, but while Reece's kohlrabi was undercooked, it was the lack of salad dressing in Courtney's salad that derailed the balance of her dish and sent her home.	908,000	7	
8/02-3	Wednesday, 22 April 2020	Melissa Leong's Mystery Box — Melissa compiled a Mystery Box featuring cherries, coriander, Manuka honey, black vinegar, five spice, taro, King George whiting, chicken feet, spring onions and galangal. Ben U. produced a standout dish, with Laura, Sarah T. and Reynold also impressing the judges. Khanh narrowly beat Brendan to secure the fifth and final spot in the immunity challenge, and the rest were sent to the Weekly Elimination.	994,000	5	
9/02-4	Thursday, 23 April 2020	Immunity Challenge: Judges' Taste Test — Ben U., Khanh, Laura, Sarah T. and Reynold each chose between Melissa's pie, Jock's pasta and Andy's curry to taste in an ingredient taste test. They then had to cook with the ingredients from the dish they had chosen, with the cooking time determined by how many ingredients each contestant had guessed correctly. Laura and Ben U. wowed the judges, but Sarah T. produced a flawless lemongrass coriander beef dish. She won the Weekly Immunity, sending the other four to join the elimination.	1,028,000	5	
9/02-5	Thursday, 23 April 2020	MasterClass: Jock Zonfrillo, Ben Ungermann, Harry Foster, Louis Tikaram and Andy Allen — Jock demonstrated what he would have cooked with Melissa's Mystery Box, and prepared a hibachi King George whiting with a taro and shallot cake. Afterwards, guest chef Louis Tikaram cooked XO pipis with crispy egg noodles, while Andy showed the contestants his BBQ octopus with burnt eggplant yoghurt and freekeh tabouli. For the first time ever, contestants were invited to join the MasterClass, with Ben U. demonstrating how to rocher ice cream and Harry demonstrating how to butterfly a fresh fish.	802,000	7	
10/02-6	Sunday, 26 April 2020	All-In Elimination: Judges' Ingredients — All contestants aside from Sarah T., who won the Weekly Immunity, had to cook a dish only using ingredients from foods that Jock, Melissa and Andy would eat on a typical day. Reynold, Tessa and Brendan produced the most impressive dishes. Most of the other contestants' dishes were also well-received, but Ben M. and Rose were criticised. While Rose's panna cotta dish had an undercooked crumb, Ben M. had an overcooked fish with an overly acidic sauce. The intense acidity made it difficult for the judges to eat his dish, and he was sent home.	968,000	4	
Week 3
11/03-1	Monday, 27 April 2020	3-Round Live Team Showdown — For their second team challenge, the 21 remaining contestants were taken to a warehouse amphitheatre with a live audience. They were split into three teams, and each had to elect one member to cook an ocean-themed dish in the first round. Tessa represented the Grey Team, Harry represented the Aqua Team, and Reynold represented the Pink Team. Tessa's calamari and scallop dish won, saving the Grey Team. For the second round, the remaining two teams had to each send one member to cook in a 30-minute duel. Simon represented the Pink Team, and Poh represented the Aqua Team. In a split decision, Simon's burnt cucumber dish won, saving the Pink Team. For the final round, all members of the Aqua Team had to cook a dish championing berries; with his coral trout and berry rasam, Khanh narrowly beat Amina to win safety, sending the rest of the Aqua Team to the pressure test.	826,000	10	
12/03-2	Tuesday, 28 April 2020	DIY Pressure Test — The members of the Aqua Team, aside from Khanh, were tasked with writing their own Pressure Test recipe and cooking it for the judges. Sarah T. delivered the dish of the day with her sweet and sour pork, with Amina, Poh and Laura also wowing the judges. Hayden's dish had a sticky honeycomb and an under seasoned ice cream, but his flavours were cohesive and balanced. Despite having the most visually spectacular dish, Harry's seafood dish had too many competing elements and overpowering flavours, and so he was eliminated.	1,082,000	4	
13/03-3	Wednesday, 29 April 2020	Barter Mystery Box — Each contestant was assigned a different four-ingredient Mystery Box, and had to cook a dish with all four ingredients. However, the contestants were allowed to barter with each other and swap ingredients if they wished. The Top 4 were Jess (parsley, parsnip, chocolate and fennel), Callum (chicken, carrot, ginger and soy), Laura (apple, peas, mint and potato) and Sarah T. (mango, coconut cream, chili and lemon). The rest were sent to the weekly elimination.	1,014,000	5	
14/03-4	Thursday, 30 April 2020	Curtis Stone's Time Auction Immunity Challenge — Curtis Stone appeared as a guest judge to set a Time Auction Challenge for Jess, Callum, Sarah T. and Laura. The contestants had 120 minutes to spend. Unlike the usual Time Auction challenge, a clock timer was set to 60 minutes. As the time decreased, the first person to raise their paddle won the ingredients for that amount of time. Laura had 45 minutes to cook her silken tofu, vinegars, green vegetables, and Indian spices, Sarah Tiong had 60 minutes to cook with her coral trout, citrus fruits, root vegetables and Asian herbs, Callum had 75 minutes for his chicken, corn, nightshades vegetables and European herbs and Jess had 100 minutes for her eggs, rice, stone fruits and Middle Eastern spices. Despite ending up with dessert-oriented ingredients, Jess cooked a savoury dish, and her 65-degree egg with turmeric noodles and chili oil received high praises. She beat Laura to win Weekly Immunity, as the others joined the All-In Elimination Challenge.	1,015,000	4	
15/03-5	Sunday, 3 May 2020	All-In Textures Elimination — Aside from Jess, who had won Weekly Immunity, all contestants participated in a two-round elimination challenge. Dani, feeling that it was still too early in the competition to use her immunity pin and thinking that her odds of making it through to the next round were good, chose to participate in the elimination challenge. In the first round, the cooks were given 75 minutes to prep a crunchy dish. Simon, Sarah T., Reynold, Tracy, and Ben U. impressed the judges enough to be declared safe immediately as their dishes were tasted. Brendan, Callum, Dani, Hayden, and Khanh, however, were declared the bottom five and thus were sent into the second round, in which they had to cook a gooey dish. Dani served kai loug kheuh with chili jam, which the judges found to be fatally flawed as her dish's egg yolk was undercooked and too runny. Since the other four nailed their dishes, Dani became the second contestant in the show's history to be eliminated while holding an immunity pin.	999,000	4	
Week 4 (Suburban Week)
16/04-1	Monday, 4 May 2020	Thai Team Service Challenge — This week the challenges took place in various Melbourne suburbs and explored their culinary offerings. For the first challenge, the 19 contestants were split into two teams to cook two entrees and three main dishes for 100 diners in Thai Ute Restaurant. Since the Orange Team had one extra member, Sarah C. chose to sit out from the challenge due to her unfamiliarity with Thai cooking. Both teams cooked spectacular entrées, impressing the judges. However, only Khanh's Orange Team (Khanh, Tracy, Brendan, Chris, Sarah, Hayden, Callum, Reynold and Jess) managed to do justice to their main dish, as Tessa's Aqua Team (Tessa, Laura, Ben, Poh, Reece, Emelia, Rose, Simon and Amina) came up short. Their chili basil clam didn't contain enough heat, their pork belly was hard, and their chicken larb lacked the body it needed. Therefore, the Aqua Team lost the challenge and was sent to the Pressure Test.	877,000	8	
17/04-2	Tuesday, 5 May 2020	Pressure Test: Helly Raichura's "Pasta Not Pasta" — The Aqua Team were taken to the suburban Indian restaurant Enter Via Laundry by Helly Raichura. The contestants first had to identify the ingredients of "Pasta Not Pasta", an intricate khandvi dish by Helly. Poh identified the fewest ingredients and was the first into elimination. However, Rose, Ben U. and Reece all tied for the second-fewest correct guesses, which led to an impromptu tiebreaker taste test. Helly brought out her kachori, and the three took turns naming its ingredients. Rose and Ben U. both failed, and joined Poh in the elimination round. With 60 minutes to recreate "Pasta Not Pasta", Poh and Ben U. wowed the judges. However, Rose's pasta was too thin and her sauce lacked balance, resulting in her elimination.	1,023,000	5	
18/04-3	Wednesday, 6 May 2020	Suburban Mystery Box — This week's Mystery Box showcased ingredients produced in the backyards and kitchens of suburban residents, containing Gravenstein apples, garlic, blue cheese, shiitake mushrooms, yellow zucchinis, basil and brown rice miso. The contestants were also each allowed to purchase one extra ingredient from Coles. Amina's lobster tortellini with miso bisque was declared the dish of the day. Emelia, Hayden, and Tracy also impressed the judges, with Emelia and Tracy joining Amina in the Top 3. The rest were sent to the Elimination Challenge.	984,000	5	
19/04-4	Thursday, 7 May 2020	Sushi Train Immunity Challenge — Tracy, Emelia, and Amina were taken to the Ganbare Kaz sushi restaurant in the Windsor suburb of Melbourne. They were tasked with preparing a sushi train for the judges, as well as the 15 other remaining contestants. Each had 150 minutes to produce five different Asian-inspired dishes, and cook 20 of each. In a blind tasting, Amina's Korean-inspired menu stood out to the judges, and she edged out Tracy to win Weekly Immunity. Emelia and Tracy joined the others in the Elimination Challenge.	957,000	5	
20/04-5	Sunday, 10 May 2020	All-In Home Delivery Elimination — All contestants except Amina participated in a two-round home delivery-themed elimination. The first round was a quiz where the contestants had to identify the name and country of origin for a variety of popular takeaway dishes. Ben U., Chris, Tessa and Tracy were the first to answer incorrectly, and were sent to the second round, in which they had to cook a dish that could withstand home delivery. Melissa returned to her house to judge the dishes after they had been delivered to her, while Jock and Andy judged the dishes in the MasterChef kitchen. All three judges were blown away by Ben U.'s nasi goreng, and Tessa's Southeast Indian snapper curry was acclaimed for its perfectly cooked fish. Tracy's Thai green chicken curry was also declared a standout dish, which meant Chris was eliminated.	941,000	4	
Week 5 (Twists Week)
21/05-1	Monday, 11 May 2020	Kitchen Switch Team Challenge — The judges announced that, this week, all challenges would start out normally, but that 'twists' would be introduced at unexpected times during the cook. The contestants were then split up into two teams and had to serve a three-course meal to 50 diners. Poh's Grey Team had one member more than Sarah T.'s Brown Team, so Hayden sat out the challenge. Halfway through the cook, the judges surprised the contestants by making the two teams swap kitchens. Each team had to then work with the elements that were being prepared by the other team, and could choose to either stick with the other team's original menu, update it, or scrap it and start from scratch. Later, the judges announced a second twist by revealing that several of the diners were vegetarian, forcing both teams to add vegetarian options to their protein-heavy menus. Both teams excelled, but the Grey Team's unbalanced mushroom sauce in their mains had bigger problems than the Brown Team's thick tortellini, costing them the win. The Grey Team was thus sent to the Pressure Test.	870,000	8	
22/05-2	Tuesday, 12 May 2020	Twisted Pressure Test: Darren Purchese's Passionfruit Pavlova — The Grey Team were given three hours to cook Darren Purchese's passionfruit pavlova dessert, designed to look like a simple pavlova on the outside but in reality composed of several complex interior elements. Many of the contestants struggled with the challenge but, with one hour left, the judges introduced a twist by taking away the contestants' recipes. Despite the difficult twist, Jess produced a near-perfect dish, with Reynold, Laura, Tracy, Callum and Sarah also receiving praise. Hayden, Poh and Amina not only struggled in the kitchen but also misfired and landed in the Bottom 3. The judges felt that all of their dishes had significant problems. However, for Amina, there were many things that none of the judges could look past and they were the broken meringue shell, mango mousse that didn't set, salted caramel that was overcooked, the glaze not being yellow and no panna cotta. Those flaws were enough to eliminate Amina.	999,000	5	
23/05-3	Wednesday, 13 May 2020	Babushka Mystery Box — The contestants were given a Mystery Box containing scampi, wild rice, peanuts, shallots, turnips, Worcestershire sauce, duck leg breast and wing and mango. Midway into the cook, however, the judges delivered a mini Mystery Box to the contestants, and announced that they would need to incorporate whatever it contained into their dishes. The mini Box was found to include figs, as well as an even smaller Mystery Box that the contestants would be allowed to open 15 minutes later. The smaller Box was then revealed to contain lemon myrtle. Most of the contestants struggled to integrate the two new ingredients, but Poh, Sarah T., Reynold, Reece, and Simon all shone. The judges selected them to advance to the Immunity Challenge, sending the other contestants to the Weekly Elimination.	946,000	5	
24/05-4	Thursday, 14 May 2020	'Hot N Cold' Immunity Challenge — In a temperature-themed challenge, Poh, Reece, Reynold, Simon and Sarah T. were tasked with cooking a hot dish featuring a cold element. During the cook, the judges announced a twist by introducing Katy Perry as a surprise guest judge and revealing that the challenge was inspired by her song 'Hot N Cold', the show's theme song. Katy's surprise appearance distracted all of the contestants, particularly Reece, but all their dishes successfully met the brief. However, the judges found the textures and flavours of Reynold's dessert to be underwhelming, despite the sophisticated plating. In a close decision between Reece, Sarah T. and Poh, Katy picked Poh's duck rendang and coconut pandan lace crêpe as her favorite dish, praising its inventiveness and artistic flair. As a result, Poh was granted Weekly Immunity as the rest joined the others in the elimination.	942,000	5	
24/05-5	Thursday, 14 May 2020	MasterClass: Jock Zonfrillo, Khanh Ong, Michael Weldon and Jerry Mai — Jock demonstrated how to make an Apple Tarte Tatin with Brown Bread Ice Cream and Salted Apple Caramel. He also demonstrated how to make Triple Hog Corn 'n' Cheese. Khanh then provided a demo of how to French trim a lamb rack with a piece of string instead of a knife. Series 3 runner-up Michael Weldon returned to show the contestants how to reverse sear beef. Guest Chef Jerry Mai showed the contestants how to make a Sticky Tamarind Pork Hock with Pineapple Apple Salsa and Ban Tieu.	537,000	13	
25/05-6	Sunday, 17 May 2020	All-In Elimination: World Cuisines and Flavour Pairings — The judges announced that Ben U. had left the show for personal reasons and would not be returning. All the contestants except for Poh then headed into a two-round elimination challenge. In a twist, the first round was revealed to be a head-to-head duel, with each contestant facing off against their benchmate on an assigned cuisine. Simon beat Callum on French, Jess beat Tessa on Vietnamese, Emelia beat Laura on Japanese, Tracy beat Hayden on Chinese, Khanh beat Sarah T. on Italian, Reece beat Brendan on Spanish and Reynold beat Sarah C. on American. Although the judges were very impressed with Sarah C.'s buffalo wings, she was narrowly beaten by Reynold who won with his inventive, highly technical take on apple pie. All the losing contestants then faced the second round, where they could choose any one of five classic flavour pairings (apple and cinnamon, tomato and basil, ginger and lemongrass, walnut and date, and beetroot and horseradish) to highlight in their dish. Brendan, Tessa and Sarah Tiong all picked lemongrass and ginger, Callum chose apple and cinnamon, Laura chose to cook with tomato and basil, and Hayden and Sarah Clare both picked beetroot and horseradish. Tessa stunned the judges with her ginger/lemongrass bonito dish, and she was immediately declared safe with Brendan, Callum, Laura and Sarah Tiong. However, Sarah Clare and Hayden both produced lacklustre beetroot and horseradish dishes and landed in the Bottom 2. Sarah's tartare definitely celebrated beetroot but it was overly earthly and actually dominated her dish, and her tartare had a broken egg yolk. However, the judges were even more disappointed in Hayden's decision to showcase his flavour combination as a condiment rather than in a main element. Also, his beetroot and horseradish ketchup was a bit of a problem. As a result, he was eliminated from the competition.	947,000	4	
Week 6
26/06-1	Monday, 18 May 2020	Savoury and Sweet Team Challenge — For this week's service challenge, the contestants were asked to distribute themselves between two teams, with one cooking savory dishes and the other cooking sweet dishes. Matt Stone mentored Brendan's Yellow Team (Tessa, Simon, Khanh, Sarah Tiong, Brendan, Sarah Clare and Laura) in cooking a savoury three-course menu and Jo Barrett mentored Reece's Pink Team (Callum, Reynold, Poh, Reece, Jess, Emelia and Tracy) in cooking a sweet three-course menu. In the tasting, both teams had standout dishes, and the judges were impressed with the Pink Team's passion fruit yuzu chiboust and the Yellow Team's kangaroo, beetroot and berries dish. Both teams, however, also had their downsides. Reynold's mistake of using dark chocolate instead of white chocolate caused the Pink Team's cake to become too dry. The judges were also critical of the cooking of the Yellow Team's squid tentacles, and felt that the high quantity of tentacles in the dish caused it to become imbalanced. In a close decision, the judges chose the Pink Team as the winners, sending the Yellow Team to the Pressure Test.	898,000	7	
27/06-2	Tuesday, 19 May 2020	Pressure Test: Peter Gunn's "Black Box" — The members of the Yellow Team were given 2 hours and 45 minutes to recreate Peter Gunn's "Black Box", a dessert designed to look like a simple black cube, but in reality being a tempered white chocolate shell containing 10 different intricate elements. Tessa and Laura amazed the judges by producing near-perfect replicas, with Khanh and Brendan also drawing praise. Most of Simon's white chocolate boxes collapsed, but he was able to salvage one unbroken box and save himself from elimination. However, Sarah C. and Sarah T. fell behind during the cook, and they weren't able to complete all their elements. With both of their missing elements, the judges had to decide based on which dish tasted closer to Peter's. In a close decision, Sarah Clare was sent home.	992,000	5	
28/06-3	Wednesday, 20 May 2020	Shannon Martinez's Vegan Mystery Box — Chef Shannon Martinez arrived to set the Mystery Box challenge. As a renowned champion of vegan food, Shannon revealed that the challenge would involve no animal-based products. The Mystery Boxes were revealed to contain miniature kitchen gardens growing baby cos, radish, beetroots, asparagus, Dutch carrots, pencil leeks, petite capsicum, thyme, celaric, pine mushrooms, sweet potato and garlic. The usual pantry staples were also substituted with vegan alternatives(vegan salted butter, vegetable shortening, soy milk, vegan cream cheese, nutritional yeast, agar agar and aquafaba). The vegan restrictions proved challenging for several contestants, with Reynold and Laura receiving negative feedback. However, Jess and Simon impressed the judges with their celeriac dishes, while Poh was praised for cooking two flavourful dishes that complemented each other. In a close decision, Reece won the final spot in the Immunity Challenge, joining Jess, Simon and Poh. The rest were sent to the Elimination Challenge.	1,015,000	5	
29/06-4	Thursday, 21 May 2020	Comfort Food Immunity Challenge — Simon, Reece, Poh and Jess were faced with a two-round Immunity Challenge centering on comfort food. In the first round, the contestants were required to revamp instant noodles into a restaurant-quality dish. Despite failing to create the crispy noodle topping for her khao soi dish, Jess impressed the judges with her flavours. Poh also succeeded with her elaborate seafood noodles, which incorporated five different types of protein. Poh and Jess advanced to the second round, sending Reece and Simon to the elimination. Jess and Poh then went head-to-head cooking their ideal comfort food. Poh's nasi lemak and otak-otak impressed the judges, but Jess's Thai red duck curry with roti canai was deemed flawless. Jess then became the first contestant to win Weekly Immunity twice, as Poh joined the elimination.	985,000	5	
30/06-5	Sunday, 24 May 2020	All-In Kingfish Elimination — Chef Josh Niland set a two-round elimination challenge themed around fish. All the contestants aside from Jess were shown several different types of fish, and had to take turns identifying them. Khanh, Emelia, Laura, Tracy and Reece were the first five to guess incorrectly, moving into the second round. Josh demonstrated how to cut a kingfish in a manner that minimized waste. The five contestants then each chose a different cut from the kingfish to use in a dish. Khanh attempted to redeem himself by recreating the canh chua dish that resulted in his elimination in the Series 10 semifinal. His risk paid off when the judges deemed his dish a standout, alongside Laura's kingfish tail with pipi broth. Reece, Tracy and Emelia, however, all overcooked their fish, but, while Emelia's sauce was too salty, the sloppy presentation in Tracy's dish sealed her fate. Tracy was thus sent home, finalising the Top 12.	932,000	4	
Week 7 (Best Dish Week)
31/07-1	Monday, 25 May 2020	Two-Dish Team Relay Challenge — The judges announced that, due to the COVID-19 pandemic, contestants would need to begin practicing social distancing and taking heightened sanitation measures. In order to allow the contestants time to adapt to these new changes, the pressure test was cancelled, two contestants would be allowed to gain Weekly Immunity from the All-In Elimination Challenge at the end of the week and one contestant was eliminated. The contestants were then split into three teams of four and competed in a relay challenge, with the winning team advancing to the first Immunity Challenge of the week. Each contestant was given 20 minutes to contribute to the team's dish, but, unlike the usual relay challenge, each team needed to produce two dishes rather than one. The Red Team (Reynold, Laura, Tessa and Reece) received negative feedback for the oily, unrefined fish in their main and the unset panna cotta in their dessert. The Blue Team (Sarah T., Poh, Jess and Callum) were criticised for their simplistic, unoriginal lamb roast dish, but praised for their passionfruit ice cream dessert, particularly Jess's coconut foam element. The Green Team (Emelia, Brendan, Simon and Khanh) hit a major hurdle when they overcooked their octopus, but Brendan salvaged the dish with five minutes to go by cooking prawns as a replacement. His effort paid off, with the judges declaring the dish an overall success, alongside their blueberry galette dessert. Therefore, the Green Team won the challenge and advanced to compete for the first Weekly Immunity spot.	928,000	6	
32/07-2	Tuesday, 26 May 2020	Immunity Pressure Test: Kirsten Tibballs' "Meljito" — For the first Immunity Challenge of the week, Kirsten Tibballs arrived to set a Pressure Test for the Green Team. Khanh, Emelia, Brendan and Simon were tasked with recreating her "Meljito", a white chocolate and watermelon dessert designed to resemble a watermelon cocktail. Simon, Khanh and Brendan all struggled with the highly technical dish, while Emelia breezed through the recipe due to her familiarity with confectionery techniques. All four of them received praise, but Khanh and Simon both botched the dessert's white chocolate casing. Brendan's dish impressed the judges despite its slightly unrefined presentation, but Emelia's replication was deemed faultless. Therefore, she won the first Weekly Immunity spot, and would skip the rest of the week's challenges.	920,000	6	
33/07-3	Wednesday, 27 May 2020	Memories Mystery Box — All the contestants aside from Emelia, who had already won Weekly Immunity, opened their Mystery Boxes to find family photos from their childhoods. They then had to cook dishes inspired by the memories shown in the photos, with the Top 4 dishes sending their makers into the second Immunity Challenge of the week. Many of the contestants grew emotional upon seeing their photographs, but all eleven contestants produced outstanding dishes. Due to the quality of food produced in the challenge, the judges announced that they would be selecting a Top 5, rather than a Top 4, to move into the Immunity Challenge. Ultimately, it was Brendan, Jess, Khanh, Poh and Reynold who won the chance to compete for the second Weekly Immunity spot. The other contestants then joined the All-In Elimination Challenge.	1,044,000	5	
34/07-4	Thursday, 28 May 2020	Fairy Tales Immunity Challenge — For the second Immunity Challenge of the week, Khanh, Brendan, Jess, Poh and Reynold were given 75 minutes to build a dish around a classic fairy tale (Goldilocks and the Three Bears, Alice in Wonderland, Beauty and the Beast, The Ugly Duckling, Hansel and Gretel, Little Red Riding Hood, and Snow White and the Seven Dwarfs). Jess picked Goldilocks and the Three Bears, Poh picked The Ugly Duckling, Reynold picked Alice in Wonderland and both Brendan and Khanh picked Beauty and the Beast. The five contestants took different approaches to interpreting their chosen stories, with varying degrees of success. Brendan missed the brief of the challenge, while Jess and Poh both had technical errors in their dishes. Khanh's kladdkaka received positive reviews, but it was no match for Reynold's technically perfect "Down the Rabbit Hole" dessert. "Down the Rabbit Hole" was declared to be a "clear winner" and Reynold joined Emelia with Weekly Immunity. The other contestants were then sent to the All-In Elimination.	960,000	5	
35/07-5	Sunday, 31 May 2020	All-In Elimination: Unusual Flavours — All contestants other than Emelia and Reynold, who had Weekly Immunity, faced a two-round elimination challenge. In the first round, the contestants were given 75 minutes to cook a dish incorporating two different flavours of ice cream, with the only requirement being that the flavour combinations were unusual and inventive. Tessa, Reece and Khanh received rave reviews, with Laura and Sarah T. also impressing. This left Brendan, Jess, Callum, Simon and Poh, who put up the least impressive ice creams, had to cook in the second round, where they were given 60 minutes to cook a dish highlighting one of five unusual flavour pairings (lamb and coffee, basil and peanut butter, dark chocolate and soy sauce, mustard and mint, and carrot and raspberry). Simon chose to do lamb and coffee, Brendan chose to cook with basil and peanut butter, Jess chose carrot and raspberry and both Poh and Callum picked mustard and mint. Poh, Callum and Brendan's dishes were impressive, but Jess' dessert and Simon's dish received mixed feedback. While Simon's lamb was cooked perfectly, the other flavours were too far down except for the coffee which dominated too much and made his dish out of balance. On the other hand, Jess chose to feature what Jock thought was the most difficult pairing: carrots and raspberries, and while she received praise for the concept of her carrot and raspberry-inspired dessert, the dish tasted more of red wine and orange than carrot and raspberry. Ultimately, the judges felt that Jess had missed the brief, and she was eliminated.	979,000	4	
Week 8 (Heats Week)
36/08-1	Monday, 1 June 2020	Heat 1: Citrus Invention Test — This week was structured as a series of 'heats', where, again, only one contestant will be eliminated. The eleven contestants were split into three groups to compete across three heats, with the winner of each heat advancing to the Immunity Challenge. Brendan, Callum and Reynold competed in the first heat, a two-round Invention Test based on citrus. In the first round, they were given 60 minutes to cook a sweet or savoury dish celebrating a citrus fruit of their choice. Brendan chose navel oranges, Reynold chose limes, and Callum chose mandarins. All three received positive feedback, but Reynold and Callum advanced to the second round, sending Brendan to the All-In Elimination Challenge. Callum and Reynold were then given 60 minutes to cook a second dish highlighting the same citrus fruit, but because both had chosen to cook desserts in the first round, they now needed to cook savoury dishes. Reynold's dish was marred by technical errors, but the judges were blown away by Callum's mandarin glazed duck with noodles. Callum then advanced to the Immunity Challenge as Reynold joined the elimination.	934,000	6	
37/08-2	Tuesday, 2 June 2020	Heat 2: Coşkun Uysal's Meat Dessert Challenge — Chef Coşkun Uysal arrived as a guest judge to set the second heat for Khanh, Tessa, Reece and Emelia. He showed the contestants his tavuk göğsü, a traditional Turkish pudding dessert containing chicken meat. The contestants were then given 75 minutes to cook a dessert highlighting a protein, using the tavuk göğsü as inspiration. Tessa, Khanh and Emelia all received rave reviews, but Reece's dessert suffered from technical errors. In a close decision, Khanh's anchovy dessert beat Emelia's fig and pig dish and secured him the win. Khanh thus advanced to the Immunity Challenge as Emelia, Reece and Tessa joined the All-In Elimination Challenge.	922,000	6	
38/08-3	Wednesday, 3 June 2020	Heat 3: Lotto Mystery Box — For the third and final heat, Laura, Poh, Sarah T. and Simon faced a special Mystery Box challenge, with the ingredients to be selected at random. The judges used a lottery drum to draw random numbers, with each number corresponding to a specific ingredient. This resulted in a Mystery Box containing kale, plums, lemon, champagne, kipfler potatoes, durian, grapes and brown onions. All four contestants struggled with the lack of protein in the Mystery Box, with Simon and Sarah T. both receiving negative feedback. Laura impressed with her cheese and potato dish, but it was no match for the flavours in Poh's lemon sponge cake. Poh then advanced to the Immunity Challenge as Laura, Simon and Sarah T. joined the All-In Elimination.	1,028,000	4	
39/08-4	Thursday, 4 June 2020	Immunity Challenge: Fast-Track to the Top 10 — Poh, Callum and Khanh competed for a fast-track to the Top 10 in a challenge structured as a mock-up of the Grand Finale. In the first round, the contestants were given 15 minutes to make a toastie. Poh's fruit bread toastie was acclaimed, and she took the lead with 25/30, as Khanh scored 24/30 and Callum 23/30. In the second round, the contestants were given 20 minutes to cook a quick dinner meal. Khanh's banh xeo was praised, and he closed the gap on Poh by scoring 29/30, against her 28/30. Callum fell further behind by scoring 26/30. For the third and final round, the contestants were given 30 minutes to cook a dessert. Despite being the underdog, Callum drew high praises for his gin and lime mousse, scoring a full 30/30. Poh and Khanh scored 22/30 and 18/30 respectively. Callum's comeback gave him a final score of 79/90, ahead of Poh's 75/90 and Khanh's 71/90. Callum then won Weekly Immunity for a second time and secured his place in the Top 10, as Poh and Khanh joined the others in the elimination.	970,000	5	
40/08-5	Sunday, 7 June 2020	All-In Elimination: Aussie Classics — All contestants aside from Callum competed in a two-round elimination challenge themed around iconic Australian dishes. For the first round, the contestants were given 90 minutes to produce their rendition of a meat pie with sauce. Poh, Brendan, Laura and Emelia produced the strongest dishes, with Reece and Khanh also scraping through to safety. This left Reynold, Tessa, Sarah T. and Simon to fall through to the second round. They were then given 1 hour to cook any dish that represented Australia for them. Reynold's Cherry Ripe-inspired dessert received rave reviews, with Tessa and Sarah T. also receiving overall praise. However, Simon's broccoli was panned for being overcooked and soggy. He was thus eliminated, finalizing the Top 10.	803,000	4	
Week 9
41/09-1	Monday, 8 June 2020	Blind Pairing Team Challenge — The Top 10 were split into pairs and given 75 minutes to cook identical dishes, but with a wall dividing each pair. The Green Team (Tessa and Reynold) were assigned sweet potato as their hero ingredient, the Red Team (Emelia and Callum) had fennel, the Grey Team (Sarah T. and Brendan) had celeriac, the Blue Team (Laura and Khanh) had peas, and the Brown Team (Poh and Reece) had corn. All five teams received positive feedback, but the Blue Team's dishes were declared the best in terms of both flavour and similarity, with the Red Team coming in at a close second. The Green Team were then also declared safe, leaving the Brown Team and Grey Team to enter the Pressure Test.	854,000	7	
42/09-2	Tuesday, 9 June 2020	No-Recipe Pressure Test: Benjamin Cooper's Jungle Curry — Chef Benjamin Cooper arrived to set a Pressure Test for Sarah T., Brendan, Reece and Poh. The contestants were given 90 minutes to replicate his jungle curry dish, but without a recipe. Instead, they were each given a sample dish for comparison to taste throughout the cook. Reece excelled, and, despite his flawed rotis, produced the closest replication of the curry. Brendan also received unanimous praise for his rendition, leaving Sarah T. and Poh to face the judges' verdict. Poh's curry was criticised for its thick consistency and caramelised taste, but Sarah T., who had accidentally burned most of her curry paste, ended up with a watery, insipid broth. This meant that her curry was furthest from the original, and she was eliminated.	1,016,000	5	
43/09-3	Wednesday, 10 June 2020	Smoking Mystery Box — The contestants opened their Mystery Boxes to find smoking guns, and were given 1 hour to produce a dish featuring smoke as a key component. Reece, Emelia and Laura all blew the judges away with their desserts, and advanced to the Immunity Challenge. In a split decision, Poh's Sichuan pepper-crusted duck beat Tessa's smoked snapper to win her the final spot in the Top 4. The rest of the contestants then joined the weekly elimination.	975,000	4	
44/09-4	Thursday, 11 June 2020	Sudden-Death Pumpkin Immunity Challenge — Laura, Poh, Reece and Emelia faced a sudden-death knockout challenge, where they were each given one pumpkin with which to cook across three rounds. Each round lasted 30 minutes, and, in each round, the contestant with the worst dish would fall out of the running for Weekly Immunity. Poh was knocked out in the first round, followed by Laura in the second round, leaving Reece and Emelia to go head-to-head in the final round. Both produced mediocre dishes, but the judges felt that Reece's pumpkin and eggplant panang curry was marginally better than Emelia's pumpkin and crème fraiche mille-feuille. Therefore, Reece won Weekly Immunity, sending the rest to join the All-In Elimination Challenge.	875,000	6	
45/09-5	Sunday, 14 June 2020	All-In Elimination: Street Food and Fine Dining — Chef Charlie Carrington arrived to set a two-round elimination challenge for all the contestants aside from Reece. For the first round, the contestants were split into pairs and given 75 minutes to cook two street food dishes from a given cuisine. The Orange Team (Laura and Emelia) were assigned Indian, the Yellow Team (Tessa and Brendan) got Mexican, the Brown Team (Poh and Callum) got Lebanese, and the Red Team (Khanh and Reynold) got Chinese. The Yellow Team nailed the challenge and received universal acclaim for their dishes, with the Brown Team also receiving somewhat positive feedback. However, the Red Team's effort was deemed mediocre, and the Orange Team's dishes were marred by technical errors. As a result, the Red and Orange Teams were sent to the second round, where they were given one hour to cook a fine dining dish from a cuisine of their choosing. Reynold's confit blue-eye and Emelia's Paris-Brest petits fours both received rave reviews and were declared safe. Laura and Khanh were criticised for serving unrefined, rustic dishes and missing the brief of the challenge. Laura's coq au vin was quail and cognac rather than chicken and wine but her flavours celebrated the classic French dish and her quail was perfectly cooked. Khanh's gà kho was a great Vietnamese dish but the dish lacked finesse and the cooking of his quail was less than perfect. As a result, he was eliminated.	945,000	3	
Week 10
46/10-1	Monday, 15 June 2020	Golden Mystery Box — The Top 8 were greeted with a fireworks display and a golden Mystery Box, containing golden raisins, golden Swiss Chard, golden beetroots, golden trout, golden syrup, gold leaf, Golden Delicious apples and gold mustard. Brendan and Tessa received high praises for their trout dishes, as did Reece and Callum for their desserts. Therefore, they were declared the Top 4 and advanced to the Immunity Challenge, leaving the rest to join the weekly elimination.	954,000	5	
47/10-2	Tuesday, 16 June 2020	Time or Ingredients Immunity Challenge — Tessa, Brendan, Reece and Callum were given up to 90 minutes to gather their ingredients from between 1 and 11 different hidden pantries, with a new pantry being revealed every 5 minutes. Reece was the first to begin cooking, and had 70 minutes to cook with pantry staples, beef and bones, gin and juniper, roots and alliums, and orchard fruits. Tessa started second, and had 60 minutes to cook with the addition of leafy greens and grains. Brendan went next, and had 50 minutes to cook with the addition of herbs and quail. Callum was the last to start, and had only 45 minutes to cook with the addition of shellfish. His mussel escabeche was praised, but he was pipped to the post by Reece, whose gin tart won rave reviews. Reece thus won Weekly Immunity for the second straight week, sending Callum, Tessa and Brendan to the All-In Elimination.	952,000	5	
48/10-3	Sunday, 21 June 2020	All-In Elimination: One-Inch Cube Challenge — All the contestants other than Reece were faced with the One-Inch Cube Taste Test, where they were blindfolded and tasked with identifying a variety of ingredients shaped into 1-inch cubes. Tessa mistook celery for celeriac, Reynold mistook ham for turkey, Brendan mistook lime for pomelo, and Emelia mistook kohlrabi for daikon. Because they had guessed incorrectly, they were sent into the second round. The judges then revealed five different pantries, each showcasing one of the five basic tastes: bitter, salty, sweet, sour and umami. Brendan, Tessa, Emelia and Reynold were given one hour to use at least one ingredient from each pantry to create a dish that balanced all five basic tastes. Tessa delivered the dish of the day with her scarlet prawn crudo, leaving Reynold, Brendan and Emelia in jeopardy. Normally, the judges love umami but today was all about balance. Unfortunately, Brendan's dish elevated umami way too far above the others. Ultimately, the judges felt that Brendan had missed the brief, and he was sent home.	988,000	3	
Week 11
49/11-1	Monday, 22 June 2020	Two-Dish Everything Box — The contestants were presented with a Mystery Box containing 8 ingredients (milk, wattle seeds, thyme, hazelnuts, parsnip, ribeye beef, caulini (a broccolini and cauliflower hybrid) and prickly pear). They were given 75 minutes to cook a sweet dish and a savoury dish using all eight ingredients across the two dishes. Tessa mistakenly left her parsnip element off the plate and failed to meet the requirements of the challenge, despite receiving high praises for both her dishes. The performances of the contestants were a mixed bag this time around but Callum, Laura and Poh all did well and were therefore declared the Top 3, advancing to the Immunity Challenge. The other contestants then joined the All-In Elimination.	951,000	5	
50/11-2	Tuesday, 23 June 2020	Alphabet Immunity Challenge — Laura, Poh and Callum were shown 26 cloches, each containing an ingredient for a different letter of the alphabet. They were each given 7 turns to pick a letter and identify the corresponding ingredient; if identified correctly, the ingredient would be added to their pantry. Callum got all of his guesses correct, and ended up with rabbit, quark, gochujang, sawtooth coriander, eggplant, kangaroo and nashi pears. Laura also got all of her guesses correct, and ended up with halva, longan fruit, Moreton Bay bugs, amaranth, watercress, flax seeds and Jerusalem artichokes. Poh misidentified caraway seeds and barberries, but successfully guessed persimmon, duck, tarragon, octopus and yuzu. Despite having a cohesive set of ingredients, Callum was roundly criticised for overthinking and overcomplicating his dish, which was deemed a "step backwards". Poh, however, excelled despite her limited pantry, but was narrowly edged out by Laura, whose brown butter bugs were declared the superior dish. Laura thus won Weekly Immunity as Poh and Callum joined the others in the elimination.	957,000	4	
51/11-3	Sunday, 28 June 2020	All-In Elimination: Classics and Novelties — All the contestants aside from Laura faced a two-round elimination challenge, with the first round focusing on culinary classics. They were shown a list of classic dishes with corresponding cooking times, and were asked to pick a dish to cook without modifying its original recipe. Emelia and Reynold chose to cook bombe Alaskas in 90 minutes. Poh and Reece chose to cook crème caramels, Tessa chose to cook fish & chips, and Callum chose to cook a chocolate soufflé, all in 60 minutes. Emelia, Reece and Callum all excelled and were declared safe. However, Poh's créme caramel failed to set, Reynold's sponge was thick and dry, and Tessa's tartare sauce did not contain capers. As a result, they were sent to the second round and given 75 minutes to produce a novel dish that the judges had never seen before. Poh had the best dish of the challenge with her inventive takes on kuih koci and rempah udang, and was declared safe. Reynold chose to cook a Sagittarius B2-inspired dessert tasting of rum and raspberries and his sorbet was light bright and amazing, but his mousse element suffered from serious technical errors. Tessa's Indian-style tacos were praised and delicious but the overall flavours distracted from the flavour of the fish and disrupted the balance of the dish. With both dishes had issues, the judges had to decide based on which of these two did a better job than the other by referring back to the brief they looking for something they've never seen before. Reynold chose to meet the brief with his presentation while Tessa chose to meet the brief with her fusion of Mexican ideas and Indian flavours. Unfortunately, the judges felt that her smokey Kashmiri chili hot sauce and pineapple salsa not only left Mexican flavours dominating the dish, but also tasted more Mexican rather than Indian, thus making the dish more classic than novel. In a close decision, Tessa was sent home for missing the brief of the challenge.	967,000	3	
Week 12
52/12-1	Monday, 29 June 2020	Rubik's Cube Mystery Box — The contestants opened their Mystery Boxes to find Rubik's Cubes, and were given 75 minutes to cook a dish using one of the six colors on the Cube as inspiration. All six fared well, but the most-positively received dishes were Poh's red-inspired Nyonya chicken curry and Laura's white-inspired yoghurt and bay leaf dessert. In a split decision, Callum's orange-inspired persimmon and kakadu plum dessert lost to Reynold's green-inspired matcha dessert, a redacted version of his Series 8 Pressure Test dish "Moss". Poh, Reynold and Laura thus advanced to the Immunity Challenge as the rest were sent to the weekly elimination.	943,000	5	
53/12-2	Tuesday, 30 June 2020	Two-Dish Lucky Dip Immunity Challenge — Reynold, Laura and Poh entered the MasterChef kitchen to find a vast arrangement of cloches containing hidden ingredients. They were told to choose any two at random, and highlight one of their assigned ingredients in a savoury dish, and the other in a sweet dish. However, if they were dissatisfied with one of their ingredients, they could decline it and choose a third cloche. Reynold ended up with madeira and fennel, but gave up his fennel and received dates instead. Laura ended up with red miso and vanilla beans, and chose to keep both. Poh ended up with bergamot and ruby grapefruit, but opted to decline her bergamot, receiving olives instead. They were then given 90 minutes to cook the two dishes. During the challenge, Reynold overcooked the quail for his savoury dish, and was forced to serve an incomplete dish consisting only of shiitake mushrooms and date purée. However, his sweet dish, a chocolate brownie with madeira gelato, received high praise, and he edged Laura out to win the challenge. He was thus granted Weekly Immunity for the second time as Laura and Poh joined the rest in the All-In Elimination.	975,000	5	
54/12-3	Sunday, 5 July 2020	All-In Pressure Test: Phil Wood's Potato Duchess — Chef Phil Wood arrived to set a Pressure Test for Laura, Emelia, Callum, Poh and Reece. In the first round, the contestants were given 75 minutes to recreate Phil's potato duchess with shiitake, cauliflower and salmon roe. Laura and Emelia were the only ones to replicate the dish successfully, and they were declared safe, while Callum, Reece and Poh all struggled and landed in the second round. They were then given 75 minutes to produce a dish highlighting either potatoes, mushrooms or cauliflower, the key ingredients from the Pressure Test dish. Callum aced the challenge, drawing rave reviews for his mushroom and bonito broth with buckwheat noodles. Reece also received positive feedback for his potato stack dessert. Poh, however, struggled again, and while her dumplings were elegant to look at, her culurgiones were raw and her sauce was rushed. She was eliminated, finalising the Top 5.	978,000	3	
Week 13
55/13-1	Monday, 6 July 2020	Terrarium Mystery Box — The contestants opened their Mystery Boxes to find a glass terrarium, and were given 75 minutes to cook a dish inspired by nature. At their disposal were the usual pantry, the garden and an additional nature-inspired pantry unveiled by the judges as inspiration. All five went on to receive positive feedback, but the judges chose Callum's autumn-inspired dessert, Laura's mushroom tortellini and Reynold's mushroom-shaped dessert as the Top 3 dishes. As a result, they advanced into the final Immunity Challenge of the season, as Emelia and Reece joined the All-In Elimination.	965,000	5	
56/13-2	Tuesday, 7 July 2020	"No Rules" Immunity Challenge — For the final Immunity Challenge of the season, the judges informed Reynold, Laura and Callum that there was no challenge brief, and that they could cook any dish they liked in a time limit agreed by them as a group. They decided on two hours as the duration of the challenge. Laura cooked a seafood snack platter designed to look like pebbles and driftwood, Callum cooked a chicken liver parfait with Davidson plum gel, and Reynold cooked a dessert resembling the Golden Snitch from the Harry Potter series. All three dishes received rave reviews, but the judges were particularly impressed with the technique, creativity and flavour in Reynold's dish. As a result, Reynold won Weekly Immunity for the second week running, and became the only contestant in the season to win Weekly Immunity three times. Reynold was thus fast-tracked to Finals Week as Laura and Callum joined the elimination.	949,000	5	
57/13-3	Sunday, 12 July 2020	All-In Elimination: Four-Course Service — All contestants other than Reynold faced a service elimination challenge, with Matt Stone, Jo Barrett, Shannon Martinez, Peter Gunn, Darren Purchese and Kirsten Tibballs all joining the judges as the guests of the service. Each contestant was assigned one of four courses, with Reece cooking vegetables, Emelia fish, Laura meat, and Callum dessert. They then had 2 hours to cook their respective dishes for the 3 judges and the 6 guests. Emelia and Laura produced standout dishes and were the first to be declared safe. However, Callum overcomplicated his dessert, despite aiming to create a simple dish. Reece was criticized for producing an overly simplistic dish that was deemed uninventive. Because his dish as whole lacked seasoning and cohesion, Reece was eliminated just shy of Finals Week.	957,000	4	
Week 14 (Finals Week)
58/14-1	Monday, 13 July 2020	Gordon Ramsay's Mystery Box — Gordon Ramsay returned via live stream to set the final Mystery Box challenge for the season, with the best dish fast-tracking its maker to the Semi-Final. The contestants were given bream, scallops, Cornish rhubarb, strawberries, mortadella, cabbage, paprika and Pimm's. Additionally, each contestant was allowed to choose a single ingredient from the garden to add to their pantry. With 75 minutes to cook their dishes, Reynold and Emelia both impressed the judges. Reynold's bream chawanmushi received unanimously positive feedback, but the judges were blown away by the technique in Emelia's compressed choux with strawberry and rhubarb. Emelia's dish was deemed a true standout, winning her Immunity from the next day's All-In Elimination and securing her spot in the Semi-Final.	1,047,000	4	
59/14-2	Tuesday, 14 July 2020	All-In Elimination: Ordinary or Extraordinary — For the final All-In Elimination of the series, Callum, Reynold and Laura were shown two pantries: an "ordinary" pantry containing everyday ingredients and an "extraordinary" pantry containing luxurious, expensive ingredients. In the first round, they were given 75 minutes to cook a dish using the pantry of their choosing, with the catch being that the two contestants moving to the second round would then need to use the pantry that they hadn't chosen for the first round. All three chose to use to the extraordinary pantry for the first round, and went on to receive rave reviews for their dishes. However, it was Reynold's barbequed bonito that won, sending him to join Emelia in the Semi-Final. This left Laura and Callum to go head-to-head the second round, where they both had to use the ordinary pantry to cook another dish in 75 minutes. Laura impressed the judges with her simple but perfectly executed strawberries and cream dessert, while Callum's coconut-poached snapper drew high praises for its flavours. However, his fish was slightly overcooked and had a mushy texture. As a result, Callum was sent home, leaving Laura to secure the last spot in the Semi-Final.	1,010,000	5	
60/14-3	Sunday, 19 July 2020	Semi-Final Pressure Test: Martin Benn's "Toffee Apple" — For the semi-final of the series, chef Martin Benn arrived to set a pressure test for the Top 3. They were given 3 hours and 45 minutes to re-create his intricate "toffee apple" dessert, with five minutes to plate the dish prior to the tasting. Emelia sailed through the 113-step recipe and delivered the dish of the day, with Benn praising her dish as one he would gladly serve at his restaurant. She was the first to be declared safe. Reynold's apple was a little bit small, but his dish had the most vivid balance of colours of the three. Laura's apple element looked more like a pear, but her flavours and textures perfectly matched those of the original. The judges unanimously agreed that Laura's dessert was deemed better than Reynold's and was closer to Martin's and so she was in the Grand Finale with Emelia, and Reynold was eliminated.	1,151,000	3	
Week 15 (Grand Finale)
61/15-1	Monday, 20 July 2020	Grand Finale: Three-Course Dinner Service — Emelia and Laura faced off in a three-course service challenge, in which they had to serve an entrée, main and dessert to the three judges, as well as most of their fellow contestants. With four hours to prepare all three courses, both Emelia and Laura faced hurdles, with Emelia struggling to pressure-cook her beef in time and Laura burning her hand, requiring medical attention. Despite these difficulties, both excelled in the service. Emelia chose to serve a menu inspired by classic French techniques and flavours, while Laura chose to showcase Indigenous Australian ingredients. Emelia's seared scallop entrée and Laura's seared bonito entrée both received rave reviews in the tasting. Similarly, for the mains, Emelia's beef short rib and Laura's Wessex Saddleback pork were both well received. Prior to the dessert course, the judges found it impossible to split the two finalists, since both entrées and both mains were perfect. Laura then mistakenly left her freezer door open, causing her Jerusalem artichoke gelato to become icy. As a result, her dessert suffered from textural issues, whereas Emelia's pistachio financier with raspberry and Davidson plum sorbet had no issues. The judges declared that, having served three faultless courses, Emelia had produced the better menu, thus winning the 'MasterChef' title of 2020.	1,261,000	2	
61/15-1	Monday, 20 July 2020	Winner Announced — Emelia Jackson was announced as the winner of the twelfth season of MasterChef Australia, receiving a prize of $250,000. Laura Sharrad was awarded $30,000 as runner-up, while Reynold Poernomo was given $20,000 for finishing in third place.	1,523,000	1	

== See also ==
- MasterChef: Back to Win
