= Justin Narayan =

Winner of MasterChef Australia 2021

- Born: Sydney, New South Wales, Australia
- Occupations: Television cook, social worker
- Known for: Winning MasterChef Australia 2021
- Predecessor: Emelia Jackson
- Successor: Billie McKay
- Website: justinnarayan.cooking

Justin Narayan is an Australian youth pastor and television cook of Fijian-Indian heritage. He was declared as the winner of MasterChef Australia 2021.

== Early life and family ==
Narayan was born in Sydney to a family with Fijian and Indian heritage. At the age of 13 he started to cook and claims that most of his dishes are inspired by his family.

== Career ==
Narayan was a youth pastor before joining MasterChef Australia. He worked for the organisation Try Alpha.

He also dabbled in an acting role in the short movie Rash Decision in 2018.

=== MasterChef ===
Narayan qualified to be one of the top 24 contestants in MasterChef Australia 2021, an Australian reality television program. He was declared the competition winner over runners-up Pete Campbell and Kishwar Chowdhury on 13 July 2021, winning $250,000 as prize money. Narayan demonstrated on the show a style of cooking that combined Indian and international cuisines, such as poached fish with curry broth, Indian chicken tacos, and Indian chicken curry.

During the final challenge of the program, Peter Gilmore challenged the top three contestants Narayan, Campbell, and Chowdhury to recreate two of his own dishes (one savoury and the other a dessert) in 5 hours to gain 40 points for each of the dishes. Campbell struggled to get together all his elements throughout the cooking session resulting in a runny custard for the savoury dish and the dessert was not complete in the plate due to a hasty assemble. On the other hand, Chowdhury's dishes were mostly impressive, however the texture of her sauce for the savoury dish lacked balance. While Narayan's squid entrée garnered positive feedback, but his dessert was slightly under-baked even though he had all the ingredients in place for the dessert. Narayan outperformed Campbell and Chowdhury, scoring 40 points for the savoury dish and 35 points for the dessert. This resulted in an overall score of 114 points for Chowdhury, 124 points for Campbell, and a total score of 125 for Narayan, who won the program by one point.

After prison guard Sashi Cheliah, Narayan is the second competitor of Indian descent to win the MasterChef Australia's first prize.

=== After MasterChef ===
After winning, Narayan said he intended to spend his $250,000 win on furthering his education. His ambitions include opening a food truck or restaurant that serves the Indian flavors he grew up with, with a portion of his profits going towards helping to feed and educate children located in the slums of India.

Narayan has also stated that he plans to cook and work for the Mumbai-based NGO Vision Rescue. Vision Rescue was started in Mumbai in 2004 by Biju Thampy, a preacher, and a motivational speaker, to offer Vada Pav to children living near the Mahim Junction Railway Station. Since then, the NGO has expanded its services to include drug rehabilitation counselling for children, providing healthcare, running a slum school and promotion of kids in sports. They also started to offer a transition house for women abused from human trafficking.

In May 2023, Narayan revealed that he had donated most of his $250,000 prize money to those in need, with the rest going towards investments.
