= Emelia Jackson =

Australian pastrycook and reality television contestant

- Born: 13 November 1989 (age 36); Melbourne, Victoria, Australia
- Education: Bachelor of Psychology & Management
- Alma mater: Monash University
- Occupations: Marketing co-ordinator, pastrycook
- Years active: 2014–present
- Known for: Winner of MasterChef Australia: Back to Win
- Television: MasterChef Australia (2014, 2020), Dessert Masters (2024)
- Predecessor: Larissa Takchi
- Successor: Justin Narayan
- Partner: Craig Gersbach
- Children: 2
- Website: emeliajackson.com

Emelia Jackson (born 13 November 1989) is an Australian pastry chef, television personality, marketing co-ordinator and cookbook author who gained recognition through her appearances on MasterChef Australia. She first competed in the show's sixth season in 2014, finishing in third place. In 2020, she returned for the twelfth season, MasterChef Australia: Back to Win, and emerged as the winner. In 2024, she was the runner-up on the second season of Dessert Masters. Jackson has authored two cookbooks: First, Cream the Butter and Sugar (2022) and Some of My Best Friends Are Cookies (2024), both focused on her signature style of accessible, refined desserts.

== Early life ==
Jackson was born in Melbourne in 1989 to an Australian father and a mother of Macedonian heritage. She attended Siena College for secondary school.

At age 14, Jackson was seriously injured after being struck by a car while catching a tram. After years of rehabilitation, during which time she missed a year of secondary school, her mother stated that the accident changed her personality to make her more driven toward her goals. Later, she attended Monash University, where she obtained a Bachelor of Psychology & Management.

== Career ==
=== MasterChef Australia ===
Jackson appeared as one of the top 24 contestants in the Australian reality television program MasterChef Australia 2014. She finished in third place on 27 July 2014.

Jackson was then invited to join the top 24 returning contestants in MasterChef Australia: Back to Win in 2020. She was declared the competition winner over runner-up Laura Sharrad on 20 July 2020, winning $250,000.

Jackson and Sharrad (then Cassai) had both appeared in the 2014 series, where Sharrad finished second and Jackson third. Jackson and Sharrad had also both attended Siena College (Camberwell) as teenagers, although not in the same school years.

=== Post-MasterChef ===
In November 2022, Jackson published a book of pastry techniques and recipes titled First, Cream the Butter and Sugar.

In May 2024, Jackson was announced as a contestant on the upcoming second season of Dessert Masters.

== Personal life ==
In 2021, Jackson and partner Craig Gersbach had a daughter. They had a son in 2023.
