= Khanh Ong =

Australian chef, television personality and writer

- Born: Indonesia
- Occupations: Cook; television personality; author; restaurateur
- Years active: 2018–present
- Employers: SBS; Network 10
- Television: MasterChef Australia; Australian Survivor; Khanh Ong's Wild Food; I’m A Celebrity…Get Me Out Of Here! Australia
- Website: khanhong.com

Khanh Ong is an Australian cook, television personality, author and restaurateur. He was as a contestant in the tenth season of MasterChef Australia, and later appeared on the twelfth season, MasterChef: Back to Win.

== Early life and education ==
Ong was born in an Indonesian refugee camp to Vietnamese parents, where he spent the first couple of years of his life. He arrived in Australia in the early 1990s and his family settled in the south-eastern suburbs of Melbourne. His parents owned a butcher shop, which started his love for food. He later attended Haileybury in high school and found a love for making clothes. When Ong was fifteen, his father died from liver cancer. He eventually started a certificate in pattern making, garment construction and fashion business from the Melbourne School of Fashion.

== Career ==
In 2018, Ong appeared as a contestant on the tenth season of Network 10's food cooking competition series MasterChef Australia, and placed third in the competition.

In April 2020, he returned to MasterChef for the show's twelfth season titled MasterChef Australia: Back to Win, which featured all returning high achieving contestants, battling it out for the $250 000 prize. Ong overall placed ninth out of twenty-four returning chefs.

In July 2020, Ong released a cookbook titled A Gay's Guide to Life, Love and Food. The book features his favourite recipes as well as dating advice, anecdotes and life hacks.

In 2022, Ong appeared as a contestant on the ninth season of Network 10's Australian Survivor. The season featured everyone going competing with a loved one, and he competed with his sister Amy. He was praised by fans and fellow competitors for his impressive strategic gameplay, and was nicknamed "King Khanh". However, he was eliminated eleventh and became the first member of the jury on day twenty seven. In early 2023, he co-hosted the fourth season of the 10Play exclusive Survivor aftershow, Australian Survivor: Talking Tribal, alongside Brooke Jowett and Shannon Guss.

In April 2023, it was announced that Ong had landed a hosting position of his very own cooking and food show on SBS Food, which was titled Khanh Ong's Wild Food. The show features him travelling around Australia and trying and cooking with different local produce.

In March 2024, Ong appeared as a contestant on the tenth season of Network 10's I'm a Celebrity...Get Me Out of Here! Australia. In 2025 he appeared as a contestant on Claire Hooper's House Of Games.

In May 2026, he returned to the Masterchef Australia kitchen as a guest judge.

== Personal life ==
Ong has been openly gay since he came out to his mother at the age of 19. He attended Haileybury College and currently resides in Melbourne, Victoria.
