= Martin Benn =

Australian chef

Martin Benn is the former chef and co-owner of Sepia, a fine dining restaurant located on Sussex Street, Sydney, Australia

Benn and Sepia have won multiple accolades over the years, including the Australian Gourmet Traveller Chef of the Year, the Australian Financial Review Chef of the Year and Restaurant of the Year and the Sydney Morning Herald Good Food Guide Restaurant of the Year.

Benn was born in Hastings, England and trained under Michel Lorrain and Marco Pierre White. He migrated to Australia in 1996 and worked at Tetsuya's before he founded Sepia in 2009.
