= Josh Niland =

Australian chef and restaurateur

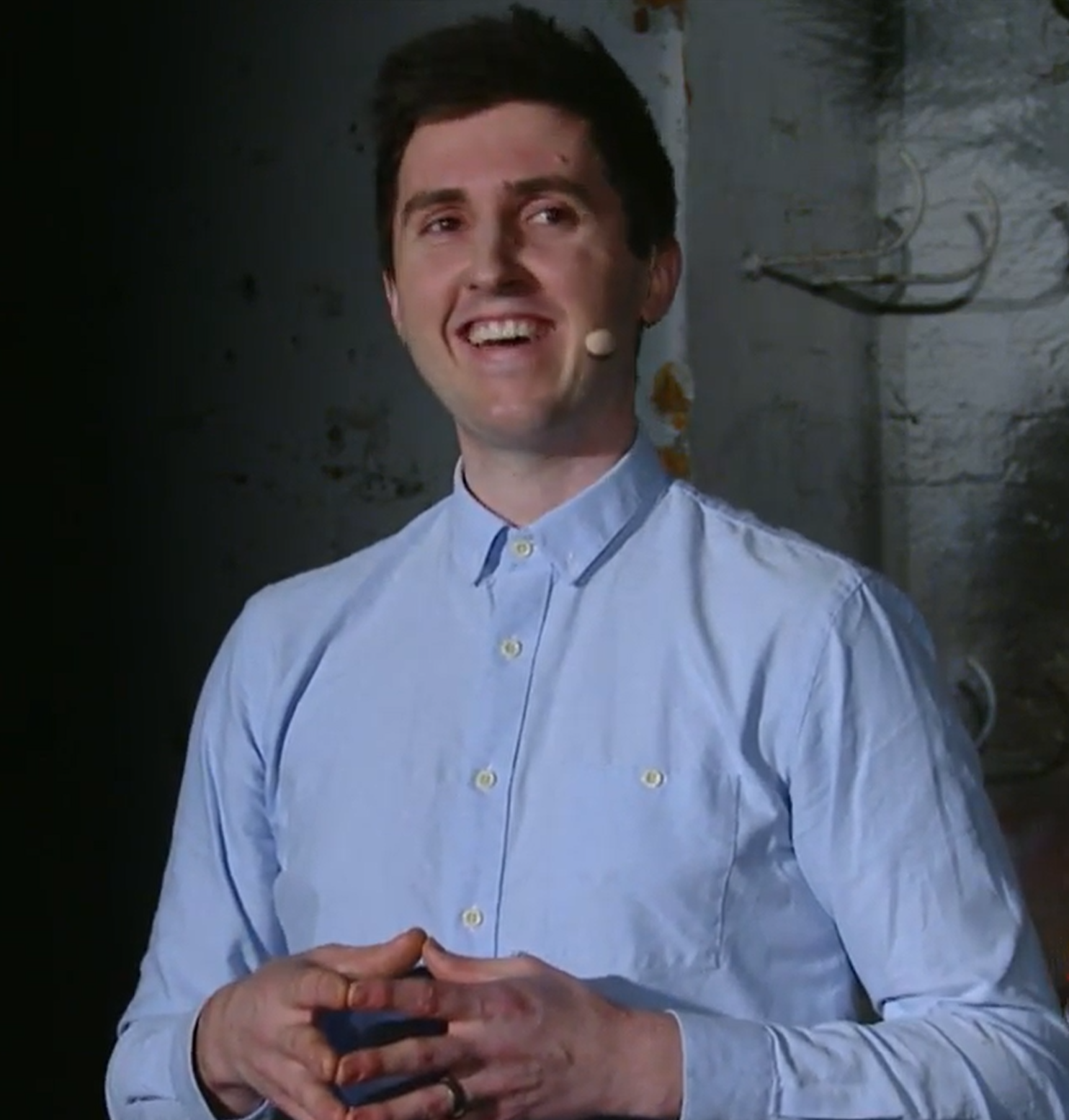
- Niland in 2018
- Born: 1988 or 1989
- Spouse: Julie Niland
- Children: 4
- Culinary career
- Cooking style: Fish
- Website: mrniland.com

Josh Niland (born in 1988 or 1989) is an Australian chef, known for practice of cooking fish with little waste.

== Early life ==
Josh Niland was born in 1988 or 1989 to Marea and Stephen Niland. He has an older sister, Liz, and grew up in East Maitland, New South Wales. As a child, Niland played sport, participating on teams with future chef and television host Andy Allen, and occasionally fished the Hunter River for flathead.

At the age of eight, Niland was diagnosed with Wilms' tumor, a form of kidney cancer, after a mass was found under his rib. He underwent surgery to remove his right kidney, and for the next 18 months underwent treatment. In one episode, chemotherapy was accidentally injected into the muscle rather than vein, bringing what Niland later described as "some of the worst pain I've ever felt". The moment was filmed, and appeared on a television documentary about children with cancer. Commenting on the footage in 2024, Niland said that he could not imagine him or his mother bearing watching the footage again. Stating that the hospital staff made him feel cared for, he credited the experience of engaging with them and seeing children die around him with informing an appreciation of kindness and a worldview that recognised the inevitability of death.

At the age of 12, Niland decided to become a chef, and three years later left school as he entered an apprenticeship. Six months in, he received a scholarship from a cancer charity presented at an event catered by Est, a Sydney fine dining restaurant run by chef Peter Doyle. Doyle invited Niland to his restaurant which he attended the following day, making the 160 km (99 mi) trip by train to Sydney. He later described the event as formative, and from then on made frequent trips on his days off to attend Sydney fine dining restaurants, taking notes on ingredients and presentation. At times in his teenage years, Niland worked at cafés.

In 2007, Niland entered a cooking competition between apprentices run by vocational education provider TAFE NSW. There he met Julie Edmunds, a competitor in a different category who was three years his junior. They began dating, and later married.

== Career ==
By 17, Niland had moved to Sydney and began work at chef Luke Mangan's Glass Brasserie. Soon, he took up a job at Est, where he first gained a meaningful interest in cooking with fish. He described this as stemming from a perception of fish chefs having status within the kitchen, saying "they had the sharpest knives" and a good understanding of restaurant economics. Over the following years, Niland worked across multiple restaurants, including at the Sydney restaurant Fish Face under chef Stephen Hodges and for a period in England at The Fat Duck. At Fish Face, an incident that later influenced his cookery came when he accidentally left fish in the restaurant's fridge overnight uncovered. Despite the fish becoming dry, he pan-fried it anyway. The result, he told National Geographic in 2023, was "probably the best fish I’ve cooked, just because of how dry the skin was".

In 2016, Niland and Julie started a restaurant in Paddington, Sydney, naming it Saint Peters. Splitting roles, Julie was tasked with management and Niland with cooking. The restaurant was initially financially unsuccessful; Niland later stated in an interview he was told by an accountant a few months in that the restaurant would not be profitable enough to last until the end of the year. To save on costs, Saint Peters began using parts of fish that had previously been discarded, reasoning that they cost the same by weight as choice cuts. With these, including bones and offal, Saint Peters produced dishes and foodstuffs such as terrine and sausage. In Niland's restaurants, around 10% of the fish is considered waste—the gills and gallbladder. At Saint Peters, a practice of leaving the fish to dry out in a fridge over days and weeks (dry aging), was implemented. Whole fish were hung from hooks, limiting contact with surfaces where the moisture could be released by the fish and retained.

In 2019, Niland released a book titled The Whole Fish Cookbook, instructing in fish butchery, processing, and cookery. The inclusion of recipes using rarely used parts of fish, such as a black pudding made from mackerel blood, raised Niland's profile internationally and won the book two James Beard Awards, the first time an Australian had won in the Book of the Year category. By 2023, the Nilands had opened four more businesses in Sydney selling fish: two Fish Butchery shops selling fish and chips and fresh fish, an à la carte restaurant named Peterman, and a takeaway shop, Charcoal Fish. Each serving different clientele, Saint Peters served dishes like fish eyeball ice cream, Peterman dishes like a yellowfin tuna dish inspired by chateaubriand, and Charcoal Fish a tuna cheeseburger. Julie acted as CEO of the restaurant group. That year, the Nilands opened Fysh in Singapore, which served fish in the manner of a steakhouse.

In mid-2024, Charcoal Fish and the Paddington Fish Butchery were closed, Petermen following soon after. In an interview the following year, the Nilands cited depressed consumer spending in the post-COVID-19 pandemic period. Through 2025, different businesses opened. Early in the year, Saint Peters was relocated within Paddington to The Grand Hotel, a refurbished 19th century pub. The move was the culmination of six years of planning and organisation that had featured frequent delays. As part of the move, the Nilands assumed the role of hoteliers, charging upwards of A$600 (around US$393) per night for 14 rooms. Seafood featured in the welcome snack, breakfast set menu, and amenities—the hand soap, for instance, was made from fish fat. As of 2025, Niland had four children with Julie; their oldest is ten.
