= Laurel Springs School =

Coordinates: 34°26′52″N 119°14′58.5″W

Location
- 302 El Paseo Road; Ojai, CA; USA

Information
- Type: Private, distance learning, college prep
- Established: 1991
- Founder: Marilyn Mosley Gordanier
- Head of school: Alyssa Tormala
- Grades: K–12
- Gender: Co-educational
- Accreditation: Western Association of Schools and Colleges and Cognia (education)
- Tuition: Average full-time: $11,000 per year
- Parent: Spring Education Group
- Website: laurelsprings.com

Laurel Springs School is a WASC- and Cognia-accredited K–12 online learning and distance learning private school in Ojai, California, United States. Laurel Springs School offers personalized resources, customizable curricula, individualized teacher services, college advising and other services to families attending public and private school.

== History ==
Laurel Springs School, founded in 1991 by Marilyn Mosley Gordanier, was the first online K–12 school in the United States. Mosley Gordanier, an American educator and author, established the school to provide an education model for students whose needs were not met by traditional classroom settings.

Prior to founding Laurel Springs, Mosley Gordanier co-founded Oak Meadow School in 1975, a Waldorf-inspired homeschooling program. In 1986, she introduced one of the first hybrid homeschooling programs for students ages 14–16, combining home study with in-person classes.

In 1994, Laurel Springs developed its first online Advanced Placement course, expanding its curriculum to support college-bound students.

In 1995, the school launched the first official web-based curriculum delivery system in the United States called “Aurora.”

In 2009, Nobel Learning Communities acquired Laurel Springs School. In 2018, Nobel Learning Communities, including Laurel Springs School, was acquired by Spring Education Group, a network of private schools operating in the United States.

== Curriculum ==
The Laurel Springs School K–12 curriculum is self-paced and mastery-based. The program includes college-preparatory courses, Advanced Placement courses, Honors courses, electives, and world language options. Coursework is delivered through an online learning management system, in which students can access classes, grades, and teacher feedback. Parents can access via a separate login with permissions tailored to their role.

Counseling support is available for all students. College and athletic advisors at Laurel Springs assist with college applications and admissions, academic planning, the athletic recruiting process, and milestone events such as signing days.

Laurel Springs also offers a program for students who want both self-paced learning and live individual support from teachers.

== Student life ==
Laurel Springs School students may participate in virtual clubs supported by faculty/staff advisors, with options including yearbook, student government, and Model United Nations. The school also offers grade-level video chats, virtual field trips, and regional in-person meetups and field trips. Students have the option to attend an annual year-end event that includes an in-person graduation ceremony, prom, field trips, and more.

== Awards ==
In 2025, Laurel Springs School received an overall grade of A+ from Niche, a school ranking and review platform, and was named by Niche as one of the Best Online High Schools in America.

Private School Review ranks Laurel Springs School among the top schools in California for most AP courses offered, most extracurriculars offered, and highest percentage of faculty with advanced degrees.

In 2021, Newsweek ranked Laurel Springs School #5 on its list of 50 Best Online High Schools in America.

In 2008, Laurel Springs School received the United States Distance Learning Association's International Distance Learning Award.

Earlier awards include the President's Youth Environmental Award (1997) and the United Nations Global 500 Roll of Honour Award (1990).

== Student achievements ==
Eleven Laurel Springs School students and alumni competed in the 2024 Summer Olympics in Paris, France, including Tyler Downs (men's diving), Austin Krajicek (men's tennis), Ruby Remati (women's synchronized swimming), and Claire Weinstein (women's swimming).

Other athletic achievements include: Nick Haness, 2025 Traverse City Horse Shows winner; Gabriella Mikaul, 2025 Patriot League Women's Tennis Rookie of the Year; Jackson Koivun, 2025 Ben Hogan Award winner; and Logan Zapp, 2019 United States Tennis Association Florida Junior Competitive Player of the Year.

Several students have achieved recognition for academic and artistic accomplishments. In 2025, Everett Elkins graduated at age 15 with 29 college credits. Tei Park was among the top scorers in California on the 2023 PSAT/National Merit Scholarship Qualifying Test. Cecilia Martin won the Columbus Symphony Orchestra's 2020 Young Musicians Competition. Melinda Sullivan received the non-classical dance award at the Music Center of Los Angeles County's Spotlight Awards in 2004.

== Partnerships ==
Laurel Springs School partners with various organizations to support athletes, performers, and other families wanting an online education. Partnerships include Junior Tennis Champions Center, a tennis training center and preparatory school; The Fila Easter Bowl, a junior tennis tournament;San Jose Earthquakes Academy, a Major League Soccer team; Coast Music Conservatory, a music school in Los Angeles County; and Novel Education Group, a tutoring and homeschooling service.

== Impact of the COVID-19 pandemic ==
During the COVID-19 pandemic, Laurel Springs School reported increased interest from families seeking alternatives to in-person schooling or existing remote learning options. The broader shift toward remote education during this period contributed to the normalization of online schooling. Laurel Springs School was identified by Grand View Research as one of the prominent U.S. online private education providers in this context.

== Notable alumni ==
=== Actors ===
- Jennifer Love Hewitt (born 1979), actress
- Elijah Wood (born 1981), actor
- Lindsay Lohan (born 1986), actress
- Evan Rachel Wood (born 1987), actress
- Emily Rios (born 1989), actress
- Hayden Panettiere (born 1989), actress
- Kristin Herrera (born 1989), actress
- Rory Culkin (born 1989), actor
- Kristen Stewart (born 1990), actress
- Emma Roberts (born 1991), actress
- Erin Sanders (born 1991), actress
- Emily Osment (born 1992), actress
- Cole Sprouse (born 1992), actor
- Dylan Sprouse (born 1992), actor
- Josh Hutcherson (born 1992), actor
- Malcolm David Kelley (born 1992), actor
- Sofia Vassilieva (born 1992), actress
- Miranda Cosgrove (born 1993), actress
- Makenzie Vega (born 1994), actress
- Sammi Hanratty (born 1995), actress
- Chloë Grace Moretz (born 1997), actress
- Kiernan Shipka (born 1999), actress
- Isabella Acres (born 2001), actress

=== Athletes ===
- Jean-Yves Aubone (born 1988), tennis coach and former tennis player
- Jenson Brooksby (born 2000), tennis player
- Blades Brown (born 2007), professional golfer
- Cade Cowell (born 2003), soccer player
- Kellen Damico (born 1989), tennis player
- Tyler Downs (born 2003), diver
- Megumi Field (born 2005), synchronized swimmer
- Abbey Forbes (born 2001), tennis player
- Madison Hubbell (born 1991), ice dancer
- Steele Johnson (born 1996), Olympic diver
- Austin Krajicek (born 1990), Olympic tennis player
- Denis Kudla (born 1992), tennis player
- Asia Muhammad (born 1991), tennis player
- Alexa Noel (born 2002), tennis player
- Ruby Remati (born 2002), Olympic synchronized swimmer
- Noah Rubin (born 1996), tennis player
- Lulu Sun (born 2001), tennis player
- Claire Weinstein (born 2007), Olympic swimmer
- Tanith Belbin White (born 1984), ice dancer

=== Musicians ===
- Bow Wow (born 1987), rapper
- Jordin Sparks (born 1989), singer
- Jewel Restaneo (born 1991), actress and musician
- Nicole Jung (born 1991), singer and former member of Kara
- Blaire Restaneo (born 1994), actress and musician
- Grace VanderWaal (born 2004), singer, songwriter, and actress

=== Other ===
- Jasper Soloff (born 1994), photographer and director
- Kendall Jenner (born 1995), model, socialite, and reality television personality
- Kylie Jenner (born 1997), CEO of Kylie Cosmetics, media personality, and socialite
- Flynn McGarry (born 1998), chef
