= MasterChef Australia series 8 =

MasterChef Australia
- Season 8
- Judges: Matt Preston; George Calombaris; Gary Mehigan
- No. of contestants: 24
- Winner: Elena Duggan
- Runner-up: Matt Sinclair
- No. of episodes: 63

Release
- Original network: Network Ten
- Original release: 1 May – 26 July 2016

Series chronology
- ← Previous; Series 7 Next → Series 9

The eighth series of the Australian cooking game show MasterChef Australia premiered on 1 May 2016 on Network Ten. All the judges from the previous series returned.

This series was won by Elena Duggan in the grand finale against Matt Sinclair, on 26 July 2016.

== Contestants ==
=== Top 24 ===
The first 19 contestants were announced on 1 May 2016. Cecilia Vuong was chosen having previously been selected in series six, as she withdrew that year before the competition started because of complications from a brain injury. A further 11 applicants were required to cook again the next day for the next four positions. The remaining seven cooks then competed for the final place. The competition includes two siblings for the first time in MasterChef Australia; Jimmy Wong and Theresa Visintin.

Contestant	Age	State	Occupation	Status
Elena Duggan	32	NSW	Teacher	Winner 26 July
Matt Sinclair	27	QLD	Coffee Roaster	Runner-up 26 July
Harry Foster	22	QLD	Cocktail Bartender	Eliminated 25 July
Elise Franciskovic	28	QLD	Pharmacy Technician	Eliminated 24 July
Mimi Baines	26	VIC	Product Manager	Eliminated 20 July
Trent Harvey	29	NSW	Electrician	Eliminated 18 July
Brett Carter	43	WA	Airline Captain	Eliminated 14 July
Chloe Bowles	24	QLD	Nanny	Eliminated 7 July
Theresa Visintin	45	NSW	Stay-at-home Mum	Eliminated 4 July; Returned 14 June; Eliminated 30 May
Heather Day	32	SA	Sales Manager	Eliminated 30 June
Karmen Lu	24	WA	Waitress	Eliminated 23 June
Anastasia Zolotarev	26	NSW	Marketing Co-Ordinator	Eliminated 20 June
Nicolette Stathopoulos	19	VIC	Student	Eliminated 16 June
Zoe Konikkos	32	VIC	Sales Manager	Eliminated 13 June
Miles Pritchett	46	QLD	Park Ranger	Eliminated 9 June
Charlie Sartori	24	VIC	Professional Golfer	Eliminated 6 June
Cecilia Vuong	32	VIC	Teacher	Eliminated 2 June
Con Vailas	31	VIC	Restaurant Supervisor	Eliminated 26 May
Jimmy Wong	49	NSW	Sustainability Specialist	Eliminated 23 May
Nidhi Mahajan	30	SA	Call Centre Worker	Eliminated 19 May
Olivia Robinson	27	NSW	Restaurant Manager	Eliminated 16 May
Adam Mizzi	30	SA	Adventure Company Owner	Eliminated 12 May
Nathaniel Milevskiy	29	QLD	Paramedic Student	Eliminated 9 May
Ashley McConnell	29	WA	Software Sales	Eliminated 5 May

Future appearance

- In Series 9 Elena Duggan appeared as a guest judge for a Mystery Box and an Invention Test Challenge, while Matt Sinclair appeared as guest chef for a team challenge.
- In Series 10 Elena appeared at the auditions to support the top 50, while Sinclair appeared as a guest chef for an Immunity challenge and won against contestant Khanh Ong. Elena later appeared at the Semi finals service challenge as a guest along with Harry Foster, Elise Franciskovic, Mimi Baines, Trent Harvey, Heather Day, Nicolette Stathopoulos & Con Vailas.
- In Series 11 Sinclair was one of the mentors for the Immunity Challenges, while Elena appeared at the team challenge in "Queensland Week" as a guest judge.
- Harry appeared in Series 12 and was eliminated on April 28, 2020, finishing 21st.
- In Series 15 Sinclair appeared as a guest team captain for a service challenge.
- Jimmy Wong appeared in Series 17 and was eliminated on May 20, 2025, finishing 19th for the second time.

== Guest chefs ==
Week	Guest Judge	Challenge
1	Billie McKay	Top 24 Mystery Box Challenge
2 (Marco Week)	Marco Pierre White	All Challenges & MasterClass
2 (Marco Week)	Jake Kellie	Immunity Challenge
3	Reynold Poernomo	Pressure Test
3	Braden White	Immunity Challenge
3	Anthony Hammel	Team Challenge
3	Daniel Wilson	Team Challenge
4 (Nigella Week)	Nigella Lawson	All Challenges & MasterClass
4 (Nigella Week)	Lachlan Colwill	Immunity Challenge
5	Jason Atherton	Pressure Test
5	Thomas Woods	Immunity Challenge
5	Hayden McFarland	Immunity Challenge
6	Maggie Beer	Mystery Box Challenge/Invention Test
6	Anna Polyviou	Pressure Test
6	Morgan McGlone	Immunity Challenge
6	Kylie Kwong	Team Challenge
7 (Power Apron; Week)	Luke Nguyen	Mystery Box Challenge/Invention Test
7 (Power Apron; Week)	Ross Lusted	Pressure Test
7 (Power Apron; Week)	Curtis Stone	Team Challenge
8	Flynn McGarry	Pressure Test
8	Victor Liong	Immunity Challenge
9 (Heston Week)	Heston Blumenthal	All Challenges & MasterClass
10	Peter Gilmore	Pressure Test
10	Troy Rhoades-Brown	Team Challenge
10	Nick Holloway	Team Challenge
10	Iain Todd	Team Challenge
10	Hadleigh Troy	Team Challenge
11 (California Week)	Dominique Crenn	Pressure Test
11 (California Week)	Wes Avila	Team Challenge
11 (California Week)	Curtis Stone	Elimination Challenge
11 (California Week)	Javier Plascencia	MasterClass
12	Christy Tania	Pressure Test
12	Alla Wolf-Tasker	Service Challenge
Final	Heston Blumenthal	Grand Final
Final	Ashley Palmer-Watts	Grand Final

== Elimination chart ==
No.	Week	1		2		3		4		5		6		7				8		9	10		11		Finals				
No.	Mystery Box Challenge Winner	Jimmy; Mimi; Nidhi		Charlie		Anastasia		Heather		Chloe		Zoe		Elise (Power Apron)				Elena		None	Brett		Matt		Harry		Elena		
No.	Invention Test Winner	None		Nidhi; Olivia; Zoe		Anastasia; Con; Nicolette		Harry; Karmen; Mimi		Karmen; Matt; Mimi		Brett; Chloe; Trent		Anastasia (Power Apron)				Elena; Karmen; Matt; Trent		None	Brett; Elise; Harry		Trent		Elena; Elise; Harry		None		
No.	Immunity Challenge	None		Lose: Zoe		Win: Nicolette		Lose: Harry		Win: Chloe, Matt		Lose: Chloe		None				Lose: Matt		None	Lose: Brett		Win: Elena		None		None		
1	Elena	Top 24	IN	IN	Team Win	IN	Team Win	IN	Team Win	IN	Team Win	IN	Team Lose	Btm 3		Team Win		Top 4	Team Win	Btm 7	IN	Team Lose	Team Win	ADV	Top 3	Top 2	ADV	Top 2	WINNER
2	Matt	Top 24	IN	Top 4	Btm 4	IN	Team Win	IN	Btm 3	Top 3	Team Lose/Imm.	IN	Team Lose	IN		Team Win		Top 4	Team Lose	Btm 3	IN	Btm 2	Team Win	Team Win	Btm 3	Top 2	Btm 3	Top 2	Runner-up
3	Harry	Top 24	IN	IN	Btm 4	IN	Team Win	Top 3	Team 2nd	IN	Team Win	Btm 3	Team Lose	Top 3		Team Win		IN	Team Win	Top 3	Top 3	Team 2nd	Team Lose	Btm 2	Top 3	Btm 2	Btm 2	3rd	Eliminated (Ep 62)
4	Elise	Top 24	IN	IN	Team Win	IN	Team Lose	IN	Team Lose	IN	Btm 3	Btm 4	Team Win	P.A.	Btm 3	Team Lose		IN	Btm 2	Top 3	Top 3	Team Win	Team Lose	Team Win	Top 3	Btm 3	4th	Eliminated (Ep 61)	
5	Mimi	Top 24	Top 3	IN	Team Win	IN	Team Win	Top 3	Team Lose	Top 3	Btm 4	IN	Btm 3	IN		Team Win		IN	Team Lose	Top 3	Btm 3	Team Lose	Team Win	Team Lose	Btm 3	Elim	Eliminated (Ep 59)		
6	Trent	Top 24	Top 4	IN	Team Lose	IN	Team Win	IN	Team 2nd	IN	Team Win	Top 3	Team Win	IN		Team Lose		Top 4	Team Lose	Btm 7	Btm 3	Team Win	WIN	Team Win	Elim	Eliminated (Ep 57)			
7	Brett	Top 24	IN	IN	Team Win	IN	Team Win	IN	Team Lose	Btm 3	Team Win	Top 3	Team Win	IN		Team Win		IN	Team Win	Btm 7	Top 3	Team 2nd	Team Lose	Elim	Eliminated (Ep 55)				
8	Chloe	Top 24	IN	IN	Team Win	Btm 3	Team Lose	Btm 3	Team Win	WIN	Team Win	Top 3	Team Lose/Imm.	Top 3		Btm 2		Btm 2	Team Win	Btm 3	IN	Elim	Eliminated (Ep 50)						
9	Theresa	Top 24	Btm 3	IN	Team Win	IN	Btm 3	IN	Team 2nd	Elim	Eliminated (Ep 22)					P.A.	T.W.	Btm 4	Team Win	Btm 7	Elim	Re-eliminated (Ep 47)							
10	Heather	Top 24	IN	IN	Team Win	IN	Team Lose	IN	Team Win	IN	Btm 3	IN	Team Win	IN		Team Win		Btm 4	Team Win	Elim	Eliminated (Ep 45)								
11	Karmen	Top 24	IN	IN	Team Win	Btm 3	Team Lose	Top 3	Team Win	Top 3	Team Win	IN	Team Win	IN		Team Win		Top 4	Elim	Eliminated (Ep 40)									
12	Anastasia	Top 24	IN	IN	Team Lose	Top 3	Team Win	IN	Team 2nd	IN	Team Lose	IN	Team Win	Top 3	P.A.	Saved		Elim	Eliminated (Ep 37)										
13	Nicolette	Top 24	IN	IN	Team Lose	Top 3	Team Win	IN	Team Win	IN	Team Win	Btm 3/Imm.	Team Win	IN		Elim		Eliminated (Ep 35)											
14	Zoe	Top 24	IN	Top 3	Team Lose	IN	Team Win	IN	Team Win	IN	Team Lose	IN	Btm 3	Elim		Eliminated (Ep 32)													
15	Miles	Top 24	IN	IN	Team Lose	IN	Btm 3	Btm 3	Team 2nd	IN	Team Win	IN	Elim	Eliminated (Ep 30)															
16	Charlie	Top 24	Btm 3	IN	Team Win	IN	Team Lose	IN	Btm 3	Btm 3	Team Lose	Elim	Eliminated (Ep 27)																
17	Cecilia	Top 24	IN	Btm 3	Btm 2	IN	Team Win	IN	Team 2nd	IN	Elim	Eliminated (Ep 25)																	
18	Con	Top 24	IN	Btm 3	Team Lose	Top 3	Team Lose	IN	Elim	Eliminated (Ep 20)																			
19	Jimmy	Top 24	Top 3	IN	Team Win	IN	Team Lose	Elim	Eliminated (Ep 17)																				
20	Nidhi	Top 24	Top 3	Top 3	Team Win	IN	Elim	Eliminated (Ep 15)																					
21	Olivia	Top 24	IN	Top 3	Team Lose	Elim	Eliminated (Ep 12)																						
22	Adam	Top 24	IN	IN	Elim	Eliminated (Ep 10)																							
23	Nathaniel	Top 24	IN	Elim	Eliminated (Ep 7)																								
24	Ashley	Top 24	Elim	Eliminated (Ep 5)																									
		Eliminated	Ashley	Nathaniel	Adam	Olivia	Nidhi	Jimmy	Con	Theresa; 1st Elimination	Cecilia	Charlie	Miles	Zoe		Nicolette		Anastasia	Karmen	Heather	Theresa; Re-elimination	Chloe	Brett		Trent	Mimi	Elise	Harry	Matt; 84 points
		Eliminated	Ashley	Nathaniel	Adam	Olivia	Nidhi	Jimmy	Con	Theresa; 1st Elimination	Cecilia	Charlie	Miles	Zoe		Nicolette		Anastasia	Karmen	Heather	Theresa; Re-elimination	Chloe	Brett		Trent	Mimi	Elise	Harry	Elena; 86 points (win)

== Episodes and ratings ==
Colour key:
– Highest rating during the series
– Lowest rating during the series

Ep#/Wk-Ep#	Original airdate	Episode Title / Event	Total viewers (five metro cities)	Nightly Ranking
Week 1
1/01-1	Sunday, 1 May 2016	Series Premiere: Auditions Part 1 - The contestants started Season 8 with a challenge, in which they had one hour to cook their signature dish, vying for automatic entry into the Top 24. Gary, Matt and George judged the competitors with either "yes" or "no", with their votes deciding whether the contestant would stay in the competition. Nineteen contestants received three yes votes and won their way through to the main competition, including Cecelia, who came back from Season 6 (who withdrew due to brain surgery). Eleven other contestants, who received either one or two yes votes, were given a second chance and cooked again in the next episode. Note: Excluding spin-offs, this was the 500th episode of MasterChef Australia.	1,012,000	#4
2/01-2	Monday, 2 May 2016	Auditions Part 2 - Eleven contestants, who were given a second chance to secure the five remaining spots in the Top 24, competed in the second challenge, in which they had 90 minutes to cook a dish with one of ten ingredients from their basket. Mimi was praised for her snapper dish and immediately received an apron. The other three contestants who received an apron were Elise, Harry and Adam.	949,000	#7
3/01-3	Tuesday, 3 May 2016	Auditions Part 3 - The remaining seven contestants faced a pressure test in the second round, in which they had to recreate Shannon Bennett's chocolate peanut bar to secure the last apron. Between the three contestants who delivered the best dishes, Miles won the last apron after earning high praise from the judges for his dish.	947,000	#7
4/01-4	Wednesday, 4 May 2016	Top 24 Mystery Box Challenge - In their first challenge, the Top 24 contestants had 75 minutes to cook with their choice of ingredients from the mystery box, which was assembled by series 7 winner Billie McKay. The three standout dishes were Nidhi's tea parfait with cornflake crumble, Mimi's tea-smoked duck dish and Jimmy's pan seared duck with stuffed mushrooms, and special mention went to Trent's pan-fried duck with home-made ricotta. The three contestants who were sent to the elimination challenge were Ashley, Charlie and Theresa.	1,058,000	#2
5/01-5	Thursday, 5 May 2016	Two Cloche Clash Elimination Challenge - The bottom three contestants faced their first elimination challenge. Each had to pick one of twelve cloches that contained twelve mystery ingredients on display and create a dish based on the chosen cloche in 75 minutes. They had the option to choose again if they didn't like their first pick, but would be stuck with their second selection. Ashley's chose mushrooms, Charlie picked ginger and Theresa selected prawns. The judges were impressed with Theresa's prawn salad and Charlie's chocolate ginger cremeux, despite the lack of ginger in the latter's dish. As a result, both were declared safe. Ashley, who tried to recreate a pasta dish and was criticised for overcooking his egg and frying his ravioli, became the first contestant to be eliminated.	1,006,000	#4
Week 2 - Marco Week
6/02-1	Sunday, 8 May 2016	Marco's Mystery Box Challenge and Invention Test - Marco Pierre White presents a mystery box that consisted of his favorite ingredients: cinnamon, chicken, extra virgin olive oil, ham, honey, lemon, parsley and potatoes, to the contestants. Cecilia, Charlie, Matt, Mimi and Nidhi were the Top 5, and Charlie won the challenge with his honey semifreddo. He had to pick a meat and three vegetables for their first invention test, and he chose lamb, parsnips, onions & carrots. The contestants had 90 minutes to cook a dish with those ingredients. Nidhi, Olivia and Zoe received praise from the judges for their dishes and competed for immunity in their first immunity challenge. Matt received special mention with his dish of lamb koftas. Con, Nathaniel and Cecilia all received negative feedback from the judges for their dishes, and they competed in their first pressure test.	905,000	#5
7/02-2	Monday, 9 May 2016	Pressure Test: Dory a la Nicoise - Nathaniel, Con and Cecilia had to copy and recreate a dish Marco was cooking with no set time limit. All their instructions came from Marco and they had 10 seconds to prepare the dish after Marco finished cooking. Cecilia managed to follow Marco's instructions carefully and took the lead in the challenge. Meanwhile, Nathaniel and Con fell behind after the latter accidentally cut himself while skinning his fish. All three managed to complete the dish. Cecilia excelled with her approach, which was similar to Marco's, and was saved. It was between Con and Nathaniel who both had issues with the presentation of their dishes. Due to his overcooked fish, Nathaniel was eliminated.	850,000	#9
8/02-3	Tuesday, 10 May 2016	Immunity Challenge: Jake Kellie - Nidhi, Olivia and Zoe had 60 minutes to make a classic pasta dish. After Olivia and Nidhi fell behind with their dishes, Zoe won the first round of the challenge with her roast pumpkin and goat cheese ravioli and advanced to the second round to compete against guest chef Jake Kellie for immunity. For the first time in an immunity cook-off, the guest chef was asked to leave the kitchen for the first 15 minutes and sit in a store room. She chose to cook Italian cuisine with a marsala and cinnamon crème brûlée in 75 minutes. Jake had 60 minutes to cook veal carpaccio. The judges praised Jake's flavour but criticised the presentation of his dish. Zoe presented her dish but it hadn't set perfectly after her brûlée top cracked, despite the judges appreciating her flavours. Therefore, her dish scored 24 points while Jake's dish scored 25.	1,029,000	#5
9/02-4	Wednesday, 11 May 2016	Plough Hotel Team Challenge - The 22 contestants traveled to Footscray at the Plough Hotel for their first team challenge. The team captains, Brett (Red Team) and Nicolette (Blue Team), each picked a card from three jars representing a three-course meal that would describe the characteristics of each meal. The teams had three hours of prep time to cook for 70 people before service began. The Blue Team fell behind after they took a lot of time to prep the dishes. The Red Team's entrée, skewered prawns, received praise from George and Gary, who declared them the winners. The Blue Team were sent to the elimination challenge after serving the judges raw scallops and also missed the mark on the theme, pub-lunch, as their entrée.	965,000	#6
10/02-5	Thursday, 12 May 2016	Alphabet Elimination Challenge - The Blue Team faced the first round of elimination. Each contestant had to name an ingredient correctly according to the first letter. Cecilia, Adam, Matt and Harry made mistakes and were sent to the second round of the challenge, in which they had 60 minutes to cook a dish, using the ingredients they chose correctly in the first round and the usual pantry staples. Both Matt and Harry produced exemplary dishes and were declared safe. Cecilia impressed the judges with the flavours of her tuna dish, but it was simplistic and the consistency of her mayonnaise was criticised. Adam, on the other hand, presented an under-seasoned and bland lamb dish that resulted in his elimination.	967,000	#5
10/02-5	Thursday, 12 May 2016	MasterClass: Marco Pierre White, Matt Preston and Gary Mehigan - The judges (minus George) and Marco treated the contestants to their first MasterClass. Marco made the contestants his risotto Milanese. Matt taught the contestants how to cook his baked cheesecake, while Gary showed them how to cook his Vietnamese duck pho, which had been chosen by viewers. Lastly, Marco taught the contestants how to cook his saffron arancini using his leftover risotto Milanese.	706,000	#9
Week 3
11/03-1	Sunday, 15 May 2016	"Viewers' Choice" Mystery Box Challenge & Invention Test - The remaining 21 contestants faced their next mystery box challenge, in which they had 75 minutes to cook with ingredients chosen by viewers: cauliflower, maple syrup, coconut, goat cheese, okra, lemon myrtle, beef mince and squid. Karmen, Con, Heather, Matt and Anastasia stood out with their dishes. The judges named Anastasia as the winner of the challenge with the advantage for the invention test. She chose marmalade, over peanut butter and vegemite, which everyone then had 75 minutes to cook a dish with. Anastasia won the second round of the competition with her orange quail dish and received a chance to compete in the immunity challenge, along with Con and Nicolette, who also impressed the judges with their inventive dishes. Karmen, Chloe and Olivia all had serious technical issues in their desserts, and were sent to the pressure test.	837,000	#5
12/03-2	Monday, 16 May 2016	Pressure Test: Reynold Poernomo's "Moss" - Chloe, Olivia and Karmen had two and a half hours to recreate season 7 alumnus Reynold Poernomo's dessert, "Moss". Chloe received praise for creating a very similar dish to Reynold's, and she was safe. Several of Karmen's elements were liked by the judges, but she didn't allow time to finish her dulce crémeux, so she didn't serve it, which was criticised. Olivia completed all the elements of the dish, but despite this, each had notable errors - a dense pistachio sponge, a lime yoghurt foam without gelatine and a matcha sphere that was left too long in the blast chiller. Those issues were too much to keep her safe over Karmen and consequently, it was enough to eliminate Olivia.	893,000	#7
13/03-3	Tuesday, 17 May 2016	Immunity Challenge: Braden White - Anastasia, Con and Nicolette faced the first round of the immunity challenge, in which they had 60 minutes to make a dish using popcorn. Both Con and Anastasia lacked sufficient popcorn flavour in their dishes, handing Nicolette the win with her popcorn parfait and the chance to cook against guest chef Braden White in the second round. She decided they would both cook fish. She had 75 minutes and cooked a confit salmon with crispy skin. In his 60 minutes, Braden cooked a mulloway dish, but the judges found his fish over-cooked and declared Nicolette the winner of the season's first immunity pin with the score of 26 to Braden's 25.	1,033,000	#4
14/03-4	Wednesday, 18 May 2016	Three Course Team Challenge from Memory: Huxtable and Pei Modern - The contestants were split randomly into two teams and were tasked with replicating a three-course meal for 30 guests from two restaurants in Melbourne: Huxtable and Pei Modern. The Blue Team was assigned to Pei Modern while the Red Team was assigned to Huxtable. The captains (Blue Team's Karmen and Red Team's Matt) and vice-captains (Blue Team's Chloe and Red Team's Trent) arrived at the restaurants to memorise the directions of the recipes from the chef of each restaurant, Anthony Hammel of Pei and Daniel Wilson of Huxtable before returning to the MasterChef kitchen, relaying instructions to their team members in order to replicate the dishes before service in 90 minutes. The Blue Team failed to replicate all of the dishes of Pei Modern's three-course meal after a series of technical issues oi each dish: the zucchini flowers in the entrée were undercooked, the radicchio puree in the main lacked colour and they left off the hot caramel topping for their dessert. As a result, they were sent to the elimination challenge after the Red Team won.	965,000	#4
15/03-5	Thursday, 19 May 2016	Raw and Cooked Elimination Challenge - After losing the team challenge, the Blue Team faced a two-round elimination challenge. In the first round, they had to prepare a raw dish with one ingredient from the pantry without cooking in 30 minutes. The rest of the team was safe, while Miles, Nidhi and Theresa, who fell behind with their dishes, had to compete in the second round. They had to cook with the ingredient they had chosen from the first round (cauliflower for Nidhi, pear for Theresa and tuna for Miles). While Miles was safe after impressing the judges with his tuna tataki, Theresa and Nidhi were left to await the final verdict. Theresa forgot the syrup on her poached pear before she could present it to the judges. Despite being an early front runner of the competition, when Nidhi served the judges her cauliflower paratha and mint chutney, her bhajis suffered from serious technical issues, which resulted in her elimination.	908,000	#5
Week 4 - Nigella Week
16/04-1	Sunday, 22 May 2016	Nigella's Mystery Box Challenge & Invention Test - International celebrity chef Nigella Lawson appeared as a guest chef for the week. She presented her chosen ingredients :butternut pumpkin, chestnut, chicken thighs, pippis, ginger, pancetta, feta cheese and cumin in a mystery box for the contestants to cook with in 75 minutes. Heather won the challenge over Charlie, Elena, Jimmy and Zoe with her open filo pumpkin pie. She chose chocolate as the core ingredient for the invention test, with 60 minutes to cook. Harry, Karmen and Mimi were named as the Top 3 with their inventive chocolate desserts. Chloe, Jimmy and Miles were sent to the pressure test after each suffered technical issues with their respective desserts.	956,000	#5
17/04-2	Monday, 23 May 2016	Pressure Test: Nigella Lawson's Three-Course Dinner - The bottom three performers in the invention test faced a Pressure Test featuring three dishes from Nigella: a crab avocado salad, lamb with radishes and peas, and a coffee panna cotta with chocolate coffee sauce. The contestants had just 60 minutes to plate up all the dishes. Chloe was praised for her dishes and was declared safe. All of Miles' dishes had notable flaws, including a salad that lacked dressing, a sauce for the lamb that was burnt and a panna cotta that had a grainy texture, which would have been enough to send him home. However, the judges were more disappointed with Jimmy. Despite getting positive feedback on his panna cotta, his salad missed some ingredients and lacked presentation and his lamb was under-cooked, sealing his elimination.	919,000	#7
18/04-3	Tuesday, 24 May 2016	Immunity Challenge: Lachlan Colwill - Having landed in the top 3 of the invention test, Harry, Karmen and Mimi were surprised in the middle of the night by Nigella and Matt as the preliminary round for the immunity challenge involved creating a midnight snack, something Nigella is well known for. Harry's brookies, a combination of brownies and cookies, were deemed the best dish and he won the right to challenge chef Lachlan Colwill for immunity in the second round . Harry chose "Christmas sweet" (over "Christmas savoury") as the pantry, but his Christmas pavlova wasn't enough to beat Colwill's Australian summer Christmas pudding and the professional won the challenge with a score of 27 over Harry's 26.	1,106,000	#4
19/04-4	Wednesday, 25 May 2016	Melbourne Showgrounds Team Challenge - The 18 contestants were randomly divided into three teams of six. They had to cook three dishes, one savoury, and two sweet, one of which had to include jam for a crowd of 1000-2000 people who turned up for a fete. The judges declared that the money that the teams made by selling their food would be donated to the Royal Children's Hospital in Melbourne. The two teams who made the most money were safe and the winning team would therefore be decided by the guests. The teams were given four hours to cook before service would start after two hours. The Yellow Team's rocky road popcorn and blondies, the Blue Team's chocolate cupcakes with jam and buttercream and the Red Team's chocolate-chip cookies were the hits of the day. The Yellow Team was declared the winner with an amount of $6326. The red team was safe with an amount of $5892, leaving the blue team to face the elimination challenge.	948,000	#5
20/04-5	Thursday, 26 May 2016	Cake Elimination Challenge - The losing team faced a cake-themed elimination. In the first round, they had to take turns tasting and naming different cakes. Charlie, Matt and Con were the first three to misname a cake and had 90 minutes to bake a cake in the second round. Matt's carrot cake received very positive feedback overall. Meanwhile, Charlie's chocolate and raspberry hazelnut cake split the judges' opinions for being dry and Con's thyme pound cake was described as unevenly baked. Both cakes were dense, but the buoyancy in the bottom interior of Con's cake resulted in his elimination.	1,111,000	#1
20/04-5	Thursday, 26 May 2016	MasterClass: Nigella Lawson, George Calombaris and Gary Mehigan - For the remaining contestants' second MasterClass, Nigella cooked her tequila and lime chicken. George presented the contestants his lamb moussaka. Gary showed the contestants his dish: fish three ways and hot-smoked trout. Nigella also presented her second recipe: her lemon pavlova.	854,000	#7
Week 5
21/05-1	Sunday, 29 May 2016	Mystery Box Challenge & Leftovers Invention Test - In the mystery box challenge, the contestants found themselves cooking with a mix of ingredients, including barramundi, vanilla beans and miso, as well as with instructions to keep every discarded piece of food stored with a "waste not, want not" principle in mind. Chloe won the challenge and her advantage was a pass straight through to the week's immunity challenge. The remaining contestants were tasked with making an inventive dish with no pantry or garden available, just what was left of the mystery box items, including the scraps. Matt, Karmen and Mimi impressed the judges and they joined Chloe in the immunity challenge, while Theresa, Charlie and Brett missed the mark and ended up in the pressure test.	808,000	#5
22/05-2	Monday, 30 May 2016	Pressure Test: Jason Atherton's Quail Afternoon Tea - Brett, Charlie and Theresa had three hours to recreate one of guest chef Jason Atherton's signature dishes. His dish consisted of five components: a roasted quail, duck tea, a slow-cooked quail egg, pearl barley mushroom porridge and a savoury parfait. While Brett's dish impressed the judges, Charlie was criticised for the consistency of his parfait and the lack of mushrooms in the porridge, but it was Theresa who was eliminated after failing to complete her dish when she missed the quail egg and duck teabag.	918,000	#7
23/05-3	Tuesday, 31 May 2016	Woodland House Immunity Challenge: Thomas Woods & Hayden McFarland - The winners of the mystery box challenge and invention test were split in pairs for the first round of the immunity challenge. Chloe, as the winner of the mystery box challenge, had a second advantage of picking one of the invention test winners as her partner. She chose Matt and in the first round, they had to cook two jaffles (sweet and savoury) in 75 minutes. Matt and Chloe beat Mimi and Karmen with his spiced mince jaffle and her apple pie jaffle. As a team, they then competed against Woodland House chefs Thomas Woods and Hayden McFarland from Melbourne in the second round with a chance for both of them to win immunity pins. With 75 minutes, they were given the option to choose two ingredients: one sweet and one savoury, for them to cook their dishes with. Matt chose prawns and Chloe picked raspberries. Thomas and Hayden had 60 minutes to cook their dishes with the same ingredients. While Thomas' raspberry vinegar jelly scored 28 points versus Chloe's rosewater bavarois, which scored with 21, Hayden's miso glazed prawns was criticised over the use of bitter melon in the dish and given a score of 18 points to Matt's 27 for his hot n' sour prawn head broth. The professionals' final score was 46 while Chloe and Matt, for the first time, won an immunity pin each with their total score of 48.	1,105,000	#2
24/05-4	Wednesday, 1 June 2016	Hellenic Republic Team Challenge - The contestants were randomly split into two teams by George. The teams had to cook a Greek three-course feast, including a lamb on a spit, for 120 guests, including George's family and friends. George's mother Mary was the guest judge with Gary and Matt. The Red Team, led by Zoe, fell behind during the challenge. Despite this, their dishes impressed the judges, but cost them the victory after they put too much cinnamon in their dessert, and they were sent to the elimination challenge.	897,000	#9
25/05-5	Thursday, 2 June 2016	One-Inch Cube Elimination Challenge - After Matt used his immunity pin to escape elimination, the other members of the team had to identify and correctly guess each cube of an ingredient while blind-folded. Cecilia, Elise, Heather and Mimi then had 60 minutes to cook a dish in the second round with the use of the ingredient they guessed incorrectly in the first round. After Mimi was declared safe with her mango dish, it was between the dishes of Heather, who used too much lemon, Cecilia, who had a lack of ham, and Elise, whose lamb sauce was too salty. The judges were unanimous and Cecilia was sent home.	1,089,000	#1
Week 6
26/06-1	Sunday, 5 June 2016	Maggie Beer's Invention Test & Mystery Box Challenge - Each contestant picked one of three ingredients: abalone, silken tofu and lemongrass, to cook a dish within 60 minutes in the invention test, which was set by Maggie Beer. The top three dishes were named and Zoe won with the use of silken tofu in her cheesecake. Her advantage was to choose the eight ingredients in the mystery box challenge for everyone to cook with in 60 minutes. She chose basil, chili, garlic, pancetta, pork mince, ricotta, thyme and tomatoes. Chloe, Trent and Brett made three top three dishes, while Charlie, Harry and Nicolette were sent to the pressure test after presenting the least impressive dishes. Elise's dish was deemed the fourth-worst, and she was therefore required to take Nicolette's place if the latter opted to play her Immunity Pin.	919,000	#5
27/06-2	Monday, 6 June 2016	Pressure Test: Anna Polyviou's "Mess" - In possession of the immunity pin, Nicolette used it and so Elise took her place alongside Charlie and Harry in the pressure test. They had three hours to make all the elements of Anna Polyviou's dessert, "Mess", and 15 minutes to plate the dish. Harry and Elise impressed the judges with the flavours of their dishes despite the issues on each of their plates. Both of them were declared safe as Charlie's plate lacked balance due to his white chocolate dome being thick and his raspberry curd missing gelatine. Despite his elimination, Polyviou offered him work experience as a pastry chef at the Shangri-La Hotel in Sydney.	1,086,000	#4
28/06-3	Tuesday, 7 June 2016	Immunity Challenge: Morgan McGlone - In the first round, Brett, Chloe and Trent had 60 minutes to bake an éclair for an advantage in the second round. Both Trent and Chloe impressed the judges, who voted Chloe as the winner with her chocolate éclair with toasted pecan praline. Hoping for a second immunity pin, Chloe chose coffee over tea as the core ingredient to cook with against guest chef Morgan McGlone of Belles Hot Chicken in Barangaroo. She presented a coffee bombe dessert, but an issue with the meringue resulted in failing to win another pin, scoring 18 points to Morgan's 22 for his coffee crusted quail.	1,069,000	#4
29/06-4	Wednesday, 8 June 2016	Melbourne Chinatown Team Challenge - Former immunity challenge mentor Kylie Kwong mentored the contestants in cook at least two Chinese dishes, with one costing $7 and any others $5, to be served to 500 people. Two teams were assigned through fortune cookies that contained a coloured paper (red or yellow) with one person on each team being assigned as captains (Red Team's Elise and Yellow Team's Chloe). The money raised was given to the Smith Family charity organisation. When the yellow team ran out of customers at their stall, they added another dish to the menu at the last minute. Both teams raised over $6000 with the Red Team winning the challenge as the Yellow Team was sent to the elimination challenge.	1,049,000	#4
30/06-5	Thursday, 9 June 2016	Lucky Dip Elimination Challenge - Chloe opted to use her immunity pin and the other members of her team faced elimination. They had to pick a core ingredient and a cuisine from lucky dip bags to cook a dish with in 75 minutes. Elena, Harry and Matt cooked the best dishes and were declared safe. Mimi's Thai lamb dish lacked a crunchy element and Zoe was criticised over the texture of the pumpkin filling in her American tart. But it was Miles' salmon dish, which lacked focus on the fish itself, that resulted in his elimination.	1,041,000	#1
Week 7 - Power Week
31/07-1	Sunday, 12 June 2016	Luke Nguyen's Mystery Box Challenge & Invention Test - For the contestants to gain a Power Apron, Luke Nguyen presented his Mystery Box (with ingredients including crickets) for them to cook an exemplary dish. Beating Matt and Heather in the challenge was Elise with the use of crickets in her parfait. After earning the power apron, Elise had 90 minutes to prepare her dish, choosing the method of frying (over steaming), while the others had 60 minutes to prepare a fried dish. Despite this advantage, Elise fell behind after wasting her 30-minute advantage due to choosing a dish that would require an element that could not be fried. Anastasia, Chloe and Harry received praise for their inventive dishes. The winner of the Power Apron was Anastasia with her tarragon prawns and fried fennel pesto. Elise was sent to the pressure test along with Elena and Zoe to face elimination.	836,000	#5
32/07-2	Monday, 13 June 2016	Ross Lusted's Two-Cloche Pressure Test - The advantage of the Power Apron gave its holder the ability to choose between the two cloches presented by Ross Lusted for the pressure test. Each cloche contained a difficult dish (sweet and savoury) for Elena, Elise and Zoe to cook. As the holder of the Power Apron, Anastasia chose his sweet perfumed stone fruit over his savoury chicken duckling dish. All the girls struggled during the challenge: Elena's dish lacked freshness as she sliced the fruits too early but it was declared she had the best replication of Lusted's dessert. Elise's burnt peach butter was lumpy and Zoe's syrup was thick, over-reduced and her sorbet was quite chalky because it had churned for too long. In a close decision, Elise's dessert was deemed better than Zoe's and Zoe was eliminated.	918,000	#7
33/07-3	Tuesday, 14 June 2016	Second Chance Cook-Off - Previously eliminated contestants returned to the MasterChef Kitchen to compete for a place back in the competition. They had 60 minutes to cook a dish with the use of the following ingredients: wine, rosemary, raspberries, dark chocolate, cardamon pods, lemon, Greek yoghurt, lamb and beetroot. The returning contestant would also receive a Power Apron for the winning dish. In possession of the Power Apron, Anastasia got a second advantage to choose one of the eliminated contestants who would add another ingredient. She chose Theresa who added desiccated coconut in order to make a yoghurt rosemary snowball which highly impressed the judges over Cecilia's yoghurt sorbet and earned Theresa her place back in the competition, winning the Power Apron.	1,040,000	#5
34/07-4	Wednesday, 15 June 2016	Six-course Degustation Challenge - Curtis Stone mentored the contestants at the restaurant Sails by the Bay in their team challenge. They were randomly chosen in pairs and each team had to cook and serve a 6 course degustation dish with the use of citruses for 50 people. The thirteenth contestant could sit out of the challenge to avoid elimination if Theresa used her Power Apron. Returning the favour for giving her the advantage to earn her place back in the competition, she chose Anastasia. The green team (Elise and Trent) attempted to come up with another element to improve their dish at the last minute, while the purple team (Chloe and Nicolette) ignored Curtis' advice for improvements on their dish. By the time the teams presented their dishes during service time, the green team's mandarin prawn salad had a technical issue on the prawns and the purple team's grapefruit sorbet received negative remarks on its presentation. Those dishes sent the two teams into the elimination round. The other teams won the challenge with the blue team's (Elena and Theresa) tangelo refresher named the dish of the day.	1,062,000	#2
35/07-5	Thursday, 16 June 2016	Nature Affinity Elimination Challenge - The contestants faced each other in pairs in a two-round elimination. For the first round, Elise and Nicolette had to cook a dish inspired by seashells while Trent and Chloe took the inspiration from autumn leaves. Elise and Trent produced the best dishes and were saved while Chloe and Nicolette then had 60 minutes to compete with a dish inspired by fire in the second round. It was a close decision, with one of them declared safe based on presentation. Although she was praised for the flavours of her dish, Nicolette was eliminated by judges' decision.	1,083,000	#2
Week 8
36/08-1	Sunday, 19 June 2016	Grotesque Mystery Box Challenge & Team Relay Invention Test - The mystery box contained "ugly" ingredients, including monkfish, celeriac, morel mushrooms, morton bay bug, blue cheese, Buddha's hand, chicken livers and horned melon for the contestants to make a dish with in 60 minutes. Elena won with her buttered bug, celeriac and horned melon. From a choice of paired ingredients, she chose honey and lemon as the core ingredients for the invention test, which was a one-hour relay challenge. Elena had another advantage of choosing her own team (Matt, Karmen and Trent), while George randomly divided the other remaining contestants into teams of four. Each team member had 15 minutes of cooking time and 45 seconds to hand over without talking to the next cook. Elena's Red Team won the challenge with a duck dish, despite missing one of the elements. The Yellow Team's dish lacked creativity after Brett changed their original dish from a trifle to a tart, but the Blue Team was the worst performer due to a lack of teamwork and Theresa's very slow start. The lack of coherence in their dessert sent the team straight to the pressure test.	895,000	#5
37/08-2	Monday, 20 June 2016	Pressure Test: Flynn McGarry's Beet Wellington - The four members of the Blue Team had two and a half hours to recreate Flynn McGarry's "Beet Wellington." Heather and Theresa impressed the judges, but both Anastasia and Chloe had a couple of serious issues in their dishes. Chloe's beet bordelaise sauce was diluted after she accidentally spilled half of her smoked beetroot water and her beet leaf balls lacked smoothness. However, despite her impressive run throughout the competition, Anastasia's struggled the most. Though she was praised of the cooking of her wellington, the dish itself lacked balance due to the filling of her beet balls being too salty and her under-smoked dates in her roulade. These were not enough for the judges to disregard her rough plating of the dish and Anastasia was eliminated.	1,064,000	#5
38/08-3	Tuesday, 21 June 2016	Immunity Challenge: Victor Liong - Elena, Karmen, Matt and Trent faced a dessert skills relay test that involved separating egg yolks, rochering five scoops of ice cream and spinning sugar to a 30 cm-high cone tower. Matt managed to complete the final task after the others fell behind in caramelising the sugar and won the opportunity to compete in the second round. He chose a pantry with ingredients from A to M (over N to Z) to compete against Melbourne chef Victor Liong of Lee Ho Fook. After Matt's and Victor's dishes both highly impressed the judges. Matt's crispy skin kingfish scored 9 from each judge for a high total of 27, but Victor's roasted crayfish received a perfect 30 (10 points each).	1,047,000	#4
39/08-4	Wednesday, 22 June 2016	Outdoor Cinema Team Challenge - Guests attended the Caulfield Racecourse for the screening of "MasterChef Australia's Greatest Hits" featuring clips from past series. The contestants were unevenly divided into two teams and had to serve two savoury dishes and one sweet dish each. After both teams chose to cook Japanese dishes, they struggled during service time. The Blue Team, led by Brett, ran out of beef for their main dishes but managed to recover. After service, the Blue Team won the challenge, after all three dishes were praised, including the black sesame pavlova dessert, which was considered a stand out dish, and were the first six contestants ever to secure their spots in the Top 10. However, the Red Team, led by Matt, presented their remaining 15 desserts late at the last minute. Their inconsistent plating and poor service upset the judges, sending them to the elimination challenge.	927,000	#8
40/08-5	Thursday, 23 June 2016	Time or Ingredients Elimination Challenge - Elise, Karmen, Matt, Mimi and Trent competed in an elimination challenge to secure the last remaining spots in the Top 10. They had up to 100 minutes to gather their ingredients from between one and five small different hidden pantries. Karmen, Matt and Trent had 75 minutes to cook with herbs and vegetables while Elise and Mimi waited another 15 minutes and had 60 minutes to cook with the addition of fruit. Trent, Matt and Mimi had amazing dishes, joining the Top 10. Karmen showed the judges her ambition and creativity in her Mille-Feuille which consisted of sweet tomatoes, soft ricotta, and Elise's charred apricot was well flavoured and the texture of the parfait and the saltiness and the flavour of the thyme in the crumb were praised. While Karmen and Elise impressed the judges with their dishes, Karmen's basil ice cream lacked the brightness and the depth of flavour which made her dish out of balance, and in the end, it's enough to send Karmen home.	912,000	#5
Week 9 - Heston Week
41/09-1	Sunday, 26 June 2016	Pop-Up Challenge 1: Melbourne Star - Heston Blumenthal mentored the Top 10 contestants for the week's challenges, which involved a pop-up restaurant each night, with contestants from each challenge being sent straight into the elimination challenge. For their first challenge, the contestants were divided into teams of two, with each team having to prepare a main dish and a dessert for 20 diners in pods on the revolving Melbourne Star, which for one night would become the world's largest pop-up restaurant. Brett and Elise were the Green Team, Elena and Mimi were the Blue Team, Heather and Trent were the Maroon Team, Theresa and Matt were the Yellow Team, and Harry and Chloe were the Red Team. Heston set the theme of the night: outer space. A number of teams struggled with timing, but all managed to get the dishes to their diners in time before the pods moved on. Theresa's "black hole" dessert for the Yellow Team was the dish of the day, with Elena's "sea stars" main for the Blue Team and Chloe's "big bang" dessert for the Red Team were also acclaimed. All three dishes were declare safe. While the Green Team's dishes were slightly disappointing, the Maroon Team had overcooked the duck in their main and a produced an overly heavy sponge cake in their dessert, making Heather and Trent the first two contestants sent into the elimination challenge.	978,000	#5
42/09-2	Monday, 27 June 2016	Pop-Up Challenge 2: Brighton Beach - The eight contestants in the top four teams at the previous pop-up restaurant were again divided randomly into teams of two: The Yellow Team (Elena and Theresa), Blue Team (Harry and Matt), Red Team (Elise and Mimi) and Green Team (Brett and Chloe), and with each team having four and a half hours to make two savoury ice creams and one savoury ice block, with the theme of childhood memories. They then had 60 minutes to serve their desserts to 500 people from the Brighton bathing boxes. The Blue Team impressed with their prawn cocktail ice-cream and gazpacho ice block, as did the Yellow Team with their mustard, bacon and chips ice cream. Both the Red and Green Teams produced disastrous ice creams and they also had problems with their ice blocks: the Red Team's were way too sweet and the Green Team's were split and flavourless. But Elise and Mimi did a better job and joined the others in tomorrow's challenge as Brett and Chloe joined Trent and Heather in the elimination challenge.	1,100,000	#4
43/09-3	Tuesday, 28 June 2016	Pop-Up Challenge 3: Melbourne University - The remaining contestants were divided into teams of two: Red Team (Elise and Theresa), Blue Team (Elena and Matt), and Yellow Team (Harry and Mimi) and had two hours to create an adventurous-themed chocolate dish at the heritage-listed Melbourne University underground carpark. Each team was assigned one type of chocolate as their core ingredient. The Yellow Team was safe after receiving praise from the judges for their dark chocolate dessert. The Red Team also received some praise for their white chocolate dish but was criticised for the dish being too sweet and not having as many elements as the other dishes and there was not a lot of relief. Some elements of the Blue Team's milk chocolate dish impressed the judges but they didn't like the bitterness of their green tea jelly, which was bland and tannic and the way they plated it up, they thought it was a mess and Elena and Matt joined the others in the elimination challenge.	1,134,000	#1
44/09-4	Wednesday, 29 June 2016	Pop-Up Challenge: Rippon Lea Estate - Harry, Elise, Mimi and Theresa competed in the last pop-up challenge at the restaurant of Rippon Lea Estate. It was a service challenge in which each received an envelope containing a recipe of an historical-themed dish. They had two hours to cook their assigned dish for 10 diners the judges. Theresa fell behind the others after panicking when preparing her dish during service. Her poor presentation of her dish and inconsistent plating gave her the last spot in the elimination challenge as Harry, Elise and Mimi were safe. Elise's fennel nougat tart was praised by the judges and declared a signature dish.	1,197,000	#1
45/09-5	Thursday, 30 June 2016	Rainbow Affinity Elimination Challenge - The losing contestants from each pop-up challenge faced an elimination challenge set by Heston and the judges. Each contestant randomly picked a knife with a colour of the rainbow (Red for Theresa, Orange for Elena, Yellow for Heather, Green for Brett, Blue for Matt, Indigo for Chloe and Violet for Trent) and they had 75 minutes to present a dish inspired by their assigned colour. Theresa, Elena and Brett had the top three dishes. They were safe from elimination, along with Trent, while Chloe, Heather and Matt all missed the mark, they also failed to impress the judges of the connection between their choice of the colours and the dish. While Chloe and Matt's dishes failed to adequately incorporate their colours, the judges were not impressed with Heather's Lemon Delicious dessert, which collapsed on the plate and also criticised her flavour combinations. Ultimately, the judges felt that Heather had missed the brief and she was eliminated.	1,002,000	#3
45/09-5	Thursday, 30 June 2016	MasterClass: Heston Blumenthal, Matt Preston and Gary Mehigan - Heston and the judges presented their recipes to the contestants in their Masterclass: Heston's roast chicken, Matt's steak sandwich, Gary's French squab and truffles and Heston's chocolate mousse.	807,000	#6
Week 10 - The toughest week
46/10-1	Sunday, 3 July 2016	The "Toughest" Mystery Box Challenge & Previous Seasons Re-Invention Test - The contestants' mystery box challenge was more difficult than usual as they had to cook a dish using all of the ingredients from the box, which consisted of corn, dates, pork belly, onion, apples, cinnamon, rum and condensed milk. Harry and Mimi delivered the best dishes, but it was Brett who won the advantage with his sticky pork and smoked corn puree. His advantage gave him the ability to choose one of three difficult invention tests from previous seasons: the cactus and prickly pear (chosen by Julia Taylor from series 4), 70s’ Apricot Chicken (chosen by Amy Shields from series 6) and earth (chosen by Billie McKay from series 7). Brett chose to re-invent the apricot chicken and the contestants had 60 minutes. Brett won a place in the immunity challenge along with Elise and Harry. Theresa, Mimi and Trent, on the other hand, failed to impress the judges. Their dishes were not well received, sending them to the pressure test.	936,000	#6
47/10-2	Monday, 4 July 2016	Pressure Test: Peter Gilmore's Cherry Jam Lamington - Peter Gilmore presented "Cherry Jam Lamington", his acclaimed dessert, to the contestants to replicate within two hours. Trent didn't receive any negative feedback from the judges on his dish and was safe. Despite struggling and making mistakes during her preparation time, Mimi also impressed the judges, although she was criticised for the lack of coconut shards in her dish. Theresa's dish lacked tartness in the cherry jam and her ice cream was too sweet. The imbalance of her dish resulted in Theresa being re-eliminated.	1,131,000	#4
48/10-3	Tuesday, 5 July 2016	Immunity Challenge: Shannon Bennett - Brett, Harry and Elise competed in the first round of the immunity challenge, which was another mystery box. They were allowed to choose to cook with one or more of the first four ingredients in twenty minutes, or open a smaller box inside to gain 20 minutes cooking time, but then had to cook with whatever ingredient was inside. Brett chose the 20 minute cooking time with venison, bay leaves, cauliflower and elderflower oil. Harry and Elise opened the smaller box which contained quandongs and another smaller box. For another 20 minutes, they both also opened this, meaning they had 60 minutes to cook with mastic, quandongs and at least one of the original ingredients. Harry struggled to incorporate the mastic into his dessert and his meringues didn't work. Elise's quandong tart and mastic ice cream was praised by the judges, but Brett won the challenge with his perfectly cooked venison. Brett then competed for immunity against MasterChef mentor Shannon Bennett with Gary running the kitchen for the challenge. Due to the week's theme of difficult challenges, he had no time advantage, and both had 60 minutes and an open pantry. Brett's lamb cutlets with smoked parsnip puree scored 17 points, but lost to Shannon's lamb two ways and mustard foam with a score of 18 points.	1,174,000	#1
49/10-4	Wednesday, 6 July 2016	Four State Corners Team Challenge - The contestants were randomly put into pairs and given two hours to serve a main and dessert for 20 people. Each team represented a corner of Australia, with Matt and Mimi's Maroon Team representing Northern Australia, Elise and Trent's Yellow Team Western Australia, Elena and Chloe's Green Team Southern Australia and Brett and Harry's Blue Team Eastern Australia. Each team was given a mentor, a resident guest chef from each corner of the nation. Ultimately, the Maroon and Green Team's desserts had technical issues, sending them to the elimination challenge, while the other teams were declared safe, with the Yellow Team winning the challenge.	1,169,000	#1
50/10-5	Thursday, 7 July 2016	Elimination Challenge: Time Auction - Chloe, Elena, Matt and Mimi competed in a time auction elimination challenge. Starting with 120 minutes, they bid in 5 minute increments for ingredients from three pantries: proteins, fruits and vegetables, and miscellaneous. Mimi ended up with 75 minutes to cook with beef, root vegetables and spices. Matt also had 75 minutes with duck, alliums and sauces. Elena gathered red mullet, nightshades and herbs with 80 minutes to cook, and Chloe had 100 minutes to cook with eggs, citrus and spreads. Elena delivered the dish of the day the, while Mimi also impressed the judges. Matt had problems with the sauce on the dish, but Chloe's eighth time facing elimination sealed her fate - she struggled throughout, her honey mousse had the wrong texture and her orange curd was too runny. After she was eliminated, the final seven learned they would be flying to San Francisco via Sydney and Trent and Elise, as winners of the team challenge, were told they would be flying business class with Qantas as their prize.	952,000	#3
Week 11 - California Week
51/11-1	Sunday, 10 July 2016	Fisherman's Wharf Eclectic Box Challenge & Fast-Track Invention Test - The judges and contestants took a trip to California for the weekly challenges. Each contestant bought one ingredient to make up the Mystery Box: Mimi chose short ribs, Elena picked fennel pollen, Brett selected fennel goat cheese, Harry chose Dungeness crab, Matt picked 100% Ecuadorian chocolate, Trent selected tangelos and Elise chose golden beets. At Fisherman's Wharf in San Francisco, they had 60 minutes to make a dish. Matt won the advantage for the invention test, and picked beef as the core ingredient from produce chosen by local farmers. The contestants had 60 minutes to make a dish using any of the produce from the open pantry, with the winning dish earning its maker the first place in a challenge to win a fast-track to Finals Week. Elise and Trent's dishes were declared the best, with the latter's spiced walnut and butter sirloin winning him the invention test and the advantage.	982,000	#5
52/11-2	Monday, 11 July 2016	Atelier Crenn Team Pressure Test - The contestants (minus Trent) were taken to Atelier Crenn, where they were divided into two teams and given two hours and 45 minutes to recreate two of Dominique Crenn's dishes and fifteen minutes to plate. The winning team joined Trent in the Fast-Track Challenge. Both teams struggled in preparing their dishes during the challenge, but they received praise for their takes one of Crenn's dishes each. The team of Elena, Matt and Mimi won the advantage to compete against Trent for a place in the finals.	1,165,000	#2
53/11-3	Tuesday, 12 July 2016	Fast-Track to the Finals Challenge - Elena, Matt, Mimi and Trent arrived at the vineyards of Inglenook Estate in Napa Valley. To compete for a fast pass to the finals, they had 90 minutes to make a dish using grapes. Elena cooked quail, grapes and goat's cheese. Trent prepared his grilled quail with cauliflower skordalia and sauce. Mimi prepared a dessert, a red wine sorbet and cake with blue cheese cream, and Matt cooked a roasted lamb rack dish. All of their dishes impressed the judges but Elena's dish was declared the most outstanding and she won the fast-pass to the Finals.	1,054,000	#4
54/11-4	Wednesday, 13 July 2016	Santa Monica Food Truck Team Challenge - At the Santa Monica Pier, food truck chef Wes Avila of Guerilla Tacos mentored the contestants in running food trucks for their next team challenge. Since Elena had already won a place in Finals week, she did not participate. The rest were divided into teams of three and with two hours, they had to prepare two dishes to be served to 200 customers. While both teams struggled during the challenge, the Red Team, consisting of Brett, Harry and Mimi, served dishes with notable issues: they scrapped their original idea of soft shell crab tacos and didn't remove the sand veins from the prawns in their second dish. The Blue Team, consisting of Elise, Matt and Trent won the challenge, joining Elena in Finals Week, sending the Red Team to the elimination challenge.	945,000	#8
55/11-5	Thursday, 14 July 2016	Maude Restaurant Elimination Challenge - Curtis Stone returned to instruct Mimi, Harry and Brett, who had 90 minutes to make a dish inspired by what they wanted to do when the competition ended. They had 90 minutes at Curtis' restaurant, Maude, in Beverly Hills. Mimi's chocolate aero mousse highly impressed the judges and she was declared safe. The creativity of Harry's plate was praised by the judges, although his burnt lemon puree overpowered the dish. Brett was praised for his perfectly cooked pork and vegetables, but his underwhelming sauce failed to meet the mark and he was eliminated.	970,000	#4
55/11-5	Thursday, 14 July 2016	MasterClass: Javier Plascencia, George Calombaris, Gary Mehigan and Matt Preston - In the Top 6's MasterClass for their last stop at the Hotel del Coronado near San Diego, guest chef Javier Plascencia presented his baja fish taco recipe. The judges also presented their respective recipes to the contestants: George's oyster ice cream, Gary's mushrooms on toast and Matt's American beef n' bacon burger.	677,000	#9
Week 12 - Finals Week
56/12-1	Sunday, 17 July 2016	Finals Mystery Box Challenge & Method Invention Test - The mystery box contained ingredients that were "hot right now" or popular to cook with, and the Top 6 contestants had 60 minutes to cook and impress the judges, with Harry, winning the challenge with his grilled cobia with gochujang sauce and kohlrabi. Taken inside the pantry, Harry had to choose between three popular methods of cooking: smoking, sous-vide and liquid nitrogen for the invention test, and he chose liquid nitrogen. The contestants had 60 minutes to cook a dish using this technique. Elena's savoury cucumber dish, along with Harry and Elise's desserts, impressed the judges and they were safe. Matt, Mimi and Trent's dishes were the least impressive and they were sent to the pressure test.	1,122,000	#3
57/12-2	Monday, 18 July 2016	Pressure Test: Christy Tania's "Mistique" - Matt, Mimi and Trent four and a half hours had to recreate Christy Tania's dessert, "Mistique", which had almost 64 steps. Mimi enjoyed the challenge, while Trent and Matt struggled. Trent was imprecise in following the recipe and the amount of mix in each layer was out of balance. He also made his banana milk brownie too thick and it didn't set. Matt made mistakes in the first two steps but managed to recover. Mimi went on to create each of the layers of the cake perfectly, while Matt's passionfruit curd did not set and became more of a sauce. All three struggled with the blue and dark chocolate sphere on the top of the dessert, but Trent's fate was sealed when his overall presentation wasn't appealing and the different layers were out of proportions, leading to his elimination.	1,286,000	#1
58/12-3	Tuesday, 19 July 2016	Lake House Service Challenge - Alla Wolf-Tasker mentored the final five contestants in a challenge at her Lake House restaurant in Daylesford. They each had to cook a dish from the menu to be served for 40 guests in two hours. Matt's performance in the kitchen impressed Alla and the judges and he was declared safe. The others fell behind during the service challenge: Harry's dish didn't have enough eel on the plate, The sauce in Mimi's chicken dish had technical issues, and Elise's kale puree was bitter. Elena's plum jelly was too thick, but her dish had the best flavours and she was also declared safe, leaving the others to face elimination.	1,155,000	#2
59/12-4	Wednesday, 20 July 2016	Elimination Challenge: Looking Back - To celebrate how far they had come in the competition, Elise, Harry and Mimi each received a box of ingredients they used to make their audition dishes, which they now had to reinvent. All three contestants struggled. Elise's brownie was raw, but when the decision was based on taste, she was safe. The lobster bisque in Harry butter poached lobster dish lacked complexity, but Mimi's blunder in using ricotta cheese, instead of goat's cheese, ultimately cost her - that element derailed the flavours of her fig ice cream dessert. Although she displayed a lot of technical skills in her dish, the elements Mimi put on the plate did not work together, and she was eliminated.	1,191,000	#1
60/12-5	Thursday, 21 July 2016	MasterClass: Chefs vs. Contestants - With it being the last Masterclass of the season the four quarter-finalists took over as the judges while Gary, George and Shannon compete in a Mystery Box Challenge. Gary won the challenge. Then Elise, Harry and Elena compete against Gary, George and Shannon in a relay challenge with the two Matt's as judges. The contestants made a mandarin dessert while Gary, George and Shannon cooked a poached quail dish. However they left a bone in the dish, handing the win to the contestants.	1,148,000	#1
Grand Finale Week
61/13-1	Sunday, 24 July 2016	Quarter-Finals: Mystery Box Challenge & Invention Test - The final four contestants faced their last mystery box challenge, in which they had 60 minutes to make a dish using ingredients chosen by their respective loved ones. Elena beat Matt's crispy skin snapper dish with her crab dish to secure her place in the semi-final. To secure their places in the semi-final, Elise, Harry and Matt each had to choose one food or cooking technique, which all three would then have to use to cook a dish in 60 minutes. Matt chose blending/juicing, Harry chose aeration and Elise chose setting, and all three made desserts. Matt's blackberry sorbet with tempered chocolate and port jelly nailed was a standout dish with the judges calling it flawless. The coconut foam for Harry's passionfruit sorbet disappointed the judges as it dissolved on the plate, but Elise's smoked chocolate parfait with orange sorbet had serious issues with both the balance of flavours and presentation. She was eliminated due to those critical issues.	1,321,000	#1
62/13-2	Monday, 25 July 2016	Semi-Finals: Service Challenge - In the semifinal of the competition, Elena, Harry and Matt had to prepare two dishes, a main and dessert, for twenty diners and the judges in a four-hour service challenge. Matt's confit duck and brioche doughnut stood out, making him the first through to the finale. It was between Elena and Harry who both had issues in their mains, despite having excellent desserts (Elena's apples and biscuits, and Harry's espresso bavarois). Elena's Australian version of a nicoise salad and Harry's lobster cannelloni were both dry due to the lack of sauces, but it was Harry's use of oily kingfish, which overpowered the lobster flavour on his canneloni that resulted in Harry's elimination, and sent Elena to the finale.	1,441,000	#1
63/13-3	Tuesday, 26 July 2016	Grand Finale - The finale took place over three rounds: entree, main and dessert. In the entree round, the judges chose a selection of core ingredients from which Elena picked marron and Matt picked quail. Matt's confit quail and sauce received 26 out of 30 points, while Elena's marron two ways lacked depth of flavour in her dashi sauce and she scored 23 points. For the main course, there were no rules, and Matt and Elise had 75 minutes to cook whatever they liked. Both Matt's crispy skin barramundi with prawn and pancetta sauce and Elena's twice-cooked lamb and smoked vegetables received perfect scores of 30, and Matt took the lead with a total score of 56 to 53. The finale then came down to the dessert: Heston Blumenthal and Ashley Palmer-Watts' "Verjus in Egg" creation. Both finalists had struggles, with Elena having to remake her 'egg yolk' jelly and Matt his coconut panna cotta 'egg white'. This led to Matt running out of time and not being able to seal the tempered chocolate egg shell in his dish, which split apart. Matt's dessert cost him the win, scoring 7 points from each of the four judges, giving him a total score of 84. Elena scored 8 each from Matt, George and Gary and 9 from Heston and Ashley, giving her 86 points.	1,711,000	#2
63/13-3	Tuesday, 26 July 2016	Winner Announced - Elena Duggan won the title of Masterchef 2016, the grand prize of $250,000 and a monthly column in the magazine Delicious while Matt Sinclair, as runner-up, received $40,000. Harry Foster, who finished in third-place, also received a cash prize of $10,000.	1,875,000	#1
