= Elena Duggan =

Australian cook

- Born: Elena Jo Duggan; 1 June 1983 (age 43); Sunshine Coast, Queensland, Australia
- Occupation: Television cook
- Television: My Market Kitchen
- Predecessor: Billie McKay
- Successor: Diana Chan
- Spouse: Eric Dedovic (m. 2018)
- Children: 1
- Awards: Winner of MasterChef Australia 2016
- Website: elenajoduggan.com

Elena Jo Duggan (born 1 June 1983) is an Australian cook. She is the winner of the 2016 series of MasterChef Australia.

== Early life ==
Duggan was born in Cooroy, Queensland, and attended Noosa District State High School. She then attended the College of Fine Arts of the University of NSW where she was awarded the degree of Bachelor of Fine Arts. She subsequently completed a postgraduate degree in teaching from the University of Sydney. She went on to teach Visual Arts and was the head teacher of creative and performing arts at Galston High School in Sydney.

== MasterChef Australia ==
Duggan applied to enter MasterChef in 2015 but she was unsuccessful. She applied again in 2016 and was accepted, having created an audition dish of fish and chips. On 26 July 2016 she competed in the final against Matt Sinclair, ultimately creating a better dessert and winning the series by 86 points to 84.

She returned in season 11 in 2019 as a guest mentor for green team at Noosa Surf Club for the Queensland Week's team challenge, where she revealed that she was pregnant, Matt was also the fellow mentor for the blue team.

== My Market Kitchen ==
In 2019, Duggan was the host of My Market Kitchen, a national television show based at the Queen Victoria Market in Melbourne, replacing series five Winner Emma Dean. Her co-presenter was series ten finalist Khanh Ong, who has replaced series five runner-up Lynton Tapp. They both got replaced by Ben O'Donoghue in 2020.
