= Marilyn Mosley Gordanier =

American educator

Marilyn Mosley Gordanier is an American educator, speaker, author, and founder of the Laurel Springs School. She is known for creating the first online K-12 school in the United States, Japan, and Korea. In 1996, the Today Show's Bryant Gumbel deemed the Laurel Springs School the "wave of the future." She is an advocate for girl's education worldwide and co-founded Educate Girls Now. She has worked to raise awareness of the dire conditions of underprivileged Afghanistan girls and to try to ensure they receive an education and are not forced into early marriage. This goal has suffered since the Taliban took control in Afghanistan.

== Career ==
Mosley Gordanier founded Laurel Springs School in 1991. Laurel Springs was the first online school in the United States and has since become the largest provider of personalized online education, serving over 85,000 students in grades K through 12. In 1995, Mosley Gordanier co-founded Mother of Divine Grace, a Catholic distance education school that serves over 10,000 students per year. In 2001, she co-founded Eikoh Web Internet High School, the first distance-learning program in Tokyo, Japan and Laurel Springs/C2 Korea, the first online learning program in South Korea.

Laurel Springs School received the United Nations Global 500 Award in 1991 and the President's Youth Environmental Award in 1997. In 2010, she received the Outstanding Leadership by an Individual in the Field of Distance Learning, from the United States Distance Learning Association. She designed the first online environmental curricula, Kids4earth and Leaders4earth, for which she was awarded Outstanding Service to Environmental Education from the North American Association of Environmental Education. Gordanier is an active member of Education for Hope - A Global South Movement built on the edict by Pope Francis that viewed education as a profound “act of hope, a seed fostering peace, justice and social renewal.

Her board memberships include Educate Girls Now, the Global 500 Environmental Forum (President), Member of the Board for the Captain Planet Foundations, and Co-President of the United States Association of the Club of Rome, official member of the International Club of Rome, President of Secure Beginnings. Member of the Rotary Club of Ojai, International Service Committee.
