= Jewel and Blaire Restaneo =

American creative duo

Jewel & Blaire Restaneo are an American acting, songwriting team and pop duo MUJYBELA from Houston, Pennsylvania. They have been in Broadway shows such as Annie Get Your Gun and A Christmas Carol . They have had starring and co-starring roles in many TV shows.

== Early years (1991-2010) ==
Jewel Restaneo was born on November 18, 1991, in Pittsburgh, Pennsylvania. She started in competitive dance and singing competitions at an early age of 18 months old, winning over 500 awards. Soon after, Jewel Restaneo's main career started when she was just three years old. She released her first CD Single in Pennsylvania and Europe titled 'Where Do I Go?', which was produced by Aaron Carter and Backstreet Boys producer Gary Carolla. The proceeds went to benefit Children Hospital in Pittsburgh, Pennsylvania. She was soon picked up by a New York Talent agency, and her sister Blaire Restaneo, born April 14, 1994, joined her in singing, dancing, and acting. Jewel & Blaire recorded and released over 6 CD's and cassettes in their hometown in stores such as Sam Goody and National Record Mart, and donated all of the proceeds to the Pittsburgh Children's Hospital.

In the year 2000, Jewel & Blaire were both cast in Martin Charnin's national tour of the musical Annie. Blaire played the role of Molly and Jewel played the role of Duffy, and later on, the title role of Annie. After touring for 6 months, Jewel & Blaire were both cast in the musical Annie Get Your Gun on Broadway in New York City (October 11, 2000 - September 1, 2001).

While living in Manhattan working in Annie Get Your Gun, Jewel & Blaire guest starred on multiple television shows such as Saturday Night Live and All My Children.

Jewel & Blaire have also worked with Erin Brockovich on ABC's Challenge America TV Special alongside other Broadway kids, Ashley Rose Orr, Danielle Brown, Jennifer Brown, and Shadoe Brandt.

After their run in Annie Get Your Gun, Jewel was cast in A Christmas Carol at Madison Square Garden with Tim Curry and F. Murray Abraham, playing the roles of Fan and Martha Cratchit (2001-2002) Blaire then starred in a Short Film Called Confection directed by Eva Saks, winning Blaire the Best Young Actress Award at the Dublin Film Festival.

In 2001, Jewel & Blaire designed a children's clothing line with the help and production of fashion designer Ace Ross, after being the cover models of his clothes for Spree Magazine.

They soon modeled at the ENK International Fashion Show. Jewel & Blaire later modeled their designs and were interviewed in Children's Business Magazine to launch the clothing line called "Apparel 4 Stars." The line was briefly sold in the year 2002 in various stores in Hollywood, such as Fred Segal kids.

In 2003, Jewel & Blaire relocated from New York to Los Angeles, California, to pursue their careers more in music. Jewel & Blaire have guest starred on some television shows such as Cold Case and Duck Dodgers, and have appeared in numerous commercials. Both sisters enrolled with Laurel Springs School in 2005 to accommodate their production schedules. In Summer 2006 Jewel & Blaire were cast as sisters Khristy & Maggie for the feature film The Legend of Sasquatch, starring William Hurt and John Rhys-Davies. In December 2006, Jewel & Blaire performed at the screening of The Legend of Sasquatch at the Viacom Paramount Christmas Party. They also performed and presented awards at the International Family Film Festival in Hollywood, CA, in which The Legend of Sasquatch was a recipient of an award.

In early 2007, Blaire was cast as the role of Therru in the English version of Goro Miyazaki's Gedo Senki: Tales From Earthsea, which was released in the UK in the summer season of the same year.

== Music ==
In 2011, Jewel & Blaire began writing and performing as electro-pop-rock band, Pixikill. They worked with Jonas Brothers producer PJ Bianco to complete an EP titled, “The Luring.” The EP debuted during an AOL listening party and was featured in multiple teen outlets including J-14 and Twist .

In 2013, Pixikill released their single “Scream” produced by The Humble Brothers. The released a self-directed and produced music video on Halloween starring J Chris Newberg, Joey Luthman, and Miranda May of Bunk'd .

In 2016, Jewel & Blaire debuted their musical project MUJYBELA. They released two songs produced by EDM producer Demitri Medina. Demitri had previously re-mixed their songs “Scream” and “Banshee” with rapper Hans Inglish.

In 2018, they began writing and producing songs on their own. They released “Boston”, “FGTW”, and “Christmas Time” as singles in 2018.

On April 14, 2020, MUJYBELA released their single “Hide Me.”

== Directing ==
Jewel & Blaire have directed, edited and produced their own Pixikill music videos for “Chameleon”, “Vampire”, “Banshee”, and “Scream.” In 2013, Jewel & Blaire began directing and editing for other musical artists. They directed and edited the Boyz II Men music videos for “Underwater” and “Already Gone” in 2014.

== Works ==
=== Filmography ===
- Confection (2003)
- Easter Sunday
- The Legend of Sasquatch (2006) (voices)
- Tales from Earthsea (2006) (voice)

=== Theatre ===
- 2000: Annie, national tour
- 2000-2001: Annie Get Your Gun, Broadway
- 2001/2002: A Christmas Carol, Madison Square Garden

=== Discography ===
- Where Do I Go (1994)
- A Christmas Jewel (1996)
- Show the World (1997)
- A Christmas Jewel II (1998)
- Merry Christmas from LA (2000)
- Sweet Destiny (2004)
- The Luring - EP (2011)
- TWO - Single (2016)
- SAME - Single (2016)
- Boston - Single (2018)
- FGTW - Single (2018
- Christmas Time - Single (2018)
- Hide Me - Single (2020)

=== Directing & Editing ===
- Freak by FutureLove (2013)
- Obsessed by FutureLove (2013)
- Underwater by Boyz II Men (2014
- Already Gone by Boyz II Men (2014)
- Falcon by Jeremy Thurber ft. Meghan Trainor (2014)
- Love Who You Wanna Love by JoLivi (2015)
