= The Legend of Sasquatch =

- Poster
- Directed by: Thomas Callicoat
- Written by: Thomas Callicoat
- Produced by: Bill J. Gottlieb; William Hurt; Thomas Callicoat
- Starring: William Hurt; John Rhys-Davies; Jewel Restaneo; Blaire Restaneo
- Edited by: Ted E. Perro
- Music by: Michael Schmidt; Stafford Hebert
- Distributed by: Gorilla Pictures
- Release date: September 12, 2006
- Running time: 73 minutes
- Country: United States
- Language: English

The Legend of Sasquatch is a 2006 American animated adventure film released by Gorilla Pictures that stars William Hurt and John Rhys-Davies. It was released on September 12, 2006 and was the first computer-animated film released by Gorilla Pictures.

== Plot ==
Ranger Steve (John Rhys-Davies) sits by a campfire, telling a story about the Davis family.

John Davis (William Hurt) is flying a water plane over a valley called Sasquatch Valley with his two daughters Khristy and Maggie. Khristy tells Maggie that a Sasquatch means Bigfoot and Maggie wonders if there are any Bigfoot in the valley. Khristy tells her that Bigfoot is a myth. They finally arrive at their new home and there are pine cones all over the house. At the end of the day everything is cleaned up and everyone goes to bed. Maggie hears something in the shed outside. She finds a small bigfoot in the shed. Maggie trips and falls and the small bigfoot runs away.

In the morning John, Maggie, and Khristy go to John's new job. They meet Dave (Joe Alaskey) the boss of the plant. A new dam is going to be built in a river that will provide power for the area. Meanwhile, Cletus McNabb and his sidekick Dawg the dog want to catch a bigfoot. That night Maggie goes outside again to look for the bigfoot. She finds him again and chases the bigfoot way out into the forest. She loses him and it starts to rain. The bigfoot comes back with his mother (June Foray) and takes her into a secret cave under a waterfall. Maggie finds out that the new dam will flood their home. The bigfoot takes Maggie home.

The next morning Maggie tries to tell John and Khristy but they don't believe her. Once John goes to work Maggie and Khristy meet Ranger Steve he says that John asked him to check up on them. Once he leaves Maggie tries to tell Khristy that bigfoot is real but Khristy does not believe her. Mad, Maggie runs to go find them. Khristy follows her and they finally come to the cave. Cletus McNabb and Dawg see them go into the cave and sets up a plan to catch one of the bigfoot.

John goes back to the house and looks everywhere for his daughters. When John goes out into the forest he runs into bigfoot and they take him to the cave. Now John knows that the bigfoot are in danger so they plan a way to stop the cave from flooding. They pile up all of the pine cones in the valley and grinding them up into pulp. They take the pulp into the cave and cover the cracks in the cave with it. Now they wonder if the walls will cave in so they have to move them out. They move them high up in the snowy mountains in another cave. Cletus and Dawg go into the cave to catch one of them but the caves close in and the cave floods and Cletus and Dawg get out. Up in the mountains the Davis family say goodbye to the bigfoot. At the end of the credits Dawg gets mad at Cletus and moves in with the Davises.

== Cast ==
- William Hurt as John Davis
- John Rhys-Davies as Ranger Steve
- Jewel Restaneo as Khristy Davis
- Blaire Restaneo as Maggie Davis
- Joe Alaskey as Dave
- Lance LeGault as Cletus McNabb
- June Foray as Mother Sasquatch
- Brian Cummings as Dawg the dog
- Camille Juliette as Birdie
- Charles Lindley as bats/various animals
- Frank Welker as Sasquatch
