= Billie McKay =

Australian cook (born 1991)

- Born: 11 July 1991 (age 35); Bowraville, New South Wales, Australia
- Occupation: Chef
- Predecessor: Brent Owens (series 6); Justin Narayan (series 13)
- Successor: Elena Duggan (season 8); Brent Draper (season 15)
- Spouse: Haydn Suridge (m. 2021)
- Children: 1
- Awards: Winner, MasterChef Australia 2015, 2022

Billie McKay (born 11 July 1991) is an Australian chef who won the seventh season of MasterChef Australia in 2015, which led to an opportunity to work at Heston Blumenthal’s three Michelin-starred restaurant, The Fat Duck in the United Kingdom. In 2022, she returned as a fan-favourite contestant for the fourteenth series, MasterChef Australia: Fans & Favourites, and won the title for a second time, becoming the first and only contestant to win the competition twice.

== Early life ==
McKay was raised on a dairy farm in Bowraville, New South Wales and attended Macksville High School. Prior to competing on MasterChef, she was a restaurant manager in Ballina, New South Wales.

== Career ==
She is best known as the winner of the seventh series of MasterChef Australia. Her prizes included $250,000, an Alfa Romeo Giulietta, and a monthly column in Delicious., an Australian food magazine. Following the final, guest judge Heston Blumenthal offered her a job at his restaurant The Fat Duck, which she accepted.

In 2019, McKay returned to MasterChef Australia's eleventh series as a mentor, sharing the position with season eight runner-up Matt Sinclair and the first series' runner up, Poh Ling Yeow.

In 2022, McKay returned to compete on the show's fourteenth season, which featured a mix of returning contestants and new contenders. She won the title for the second time defeating Sarah Todd in the Grand Finale.
