= Larissa Takchi =

Australian cook (born 1997)

- Born: 1997 (age 28–29); Sydney, New South Wales, Australia
- Other name: Larissa Dominello
- Occupation: Television cook
- Predecessor: Sashi Cheliah
- Successor: Emelia Jackson
- Spouse: Luke Dominello (m. 2021)
- Awards: Winner of MasterChef Australia 2019

Larissa Takchi (born 1997) is an Australian cook who won the eleventh series of MasterChef Australia in 2019. At 22 years old, to date she was the youngest contestant to win the competition.

== Early life ==
Takchi was born in Sydney, into a family of Lebanese origin. Her grandparents had emigrated from Lebanon to Australia, and founded a stone fruit farm in Glenorie. Her mother owned a cafe in Dural. Prior to winning MasterChef Australia, she served as the general manager of her mother's cafe.

In primary school she attended Hillside Public School, and high school at Mount St Benedict College. Takchi attended Macquarie University, where she studied business.

== MasterChef Australia ==
Takchi was selected in the 2019 auditions to join the 'Top 24' as a contestant on MasterChef Australia. On 23 July 2019, Takchi was announced as the winner of MasterChef 2019 and received a cash prize of $250,000, a new Holden Equinox car, and a monthly column in Delicious magazine for 12 months. Her winning dish was "Szechuan Pavlova", a dessert featuring beetroot and blackberry sorbet, Sichuan (Szechuan) pepper, and lemon cream.
