= MasterChef Australia series 11 =

MasterChef Australia
- Season 11
- Judges: Matt Preston; George Calombaris; Gary Mehigan
- No. of contestants: 24
- Winner: Larissa Takchi
- Runner-up: Tessa Boersma
- No. of episodes: 61

Release
- Original network: Network 10
- Original release: 29 April – 23 July 2019

Series chronology
- ← Previous; Series 10 Next → Series 12

The eleventh series of the Australian cooking game show MasterChef Australia premiered on 29 April 2019 on Network 10. It was the final season where Gary Mehigan, George Calombaris and Matt Preston served as judges.

This series was won by Larissa Takchi in the grand finale against Tessa Boersma and Simon Toohey, broadcast on 23 July 2019.

== Changes ==
Former contestants Poh Ling Yeow, Billie McKay and Matt Sinclair replaced Shannon Bennett as the contestants' mentors.

The finale featured three finalists instead of two.

== Contestants ==
=== Top 24 ===
The Top 24 were announced on 29–30 April 2019.

Contestant	Age	State	Occupation	Status
Larissa Takchi	22	NSW	Restaurant Manager	Winner 23 July
Tessa Boersma	27	QLD	Criminal Statistician	Runner-up 23 July
Simon Toohey	32	VIC	Cocktail Barman	Third place 23 July
Tim Bone	33	VIC	Cooking and Gardening Educator	Re-Eliminated 22 July; Returned 10 June; Eliminated 3 June
Nicole Scott	24	QLD	HR Assistant	Eliminated 21 July
Anushka Zargaryan	49	VIC	Optical Dispenser	Eliminated 15 July
Christina Laker	29	QLD	Naturopathy Student	Eliminated 11 July
Derek Lau	26	WA	Financial Analyst	Eliminated 4 July
Tati Carlin	49	VIC	Receptionist	Eliminated 1 July
Ben Trobbiani	24	SA	Pharmacist	Eliminated 27 June
Sandeep Pandit	37	VIC	IT Project Manager	Eliminated 20 June
Steph De Sousa	45	NSW	HR Specialist	Eliminated 17 June
Abbey Rose	28	NSW	Kitchen & Homewares Buyer	Eliminated 13 June
Walleed Rasheed	38	VIC	Marketing Analyst	Eliminated 10 June
Joe Ahern	22	WA	Digital Production Assistant	Eliminated 6 June
Kyle Lyons	29	WA	Brewery Sales Manager	Eliminated 30 May
Leah Milburn-Clark	22	VIC	Theatre Manager	Eliminated 27 May
Blake Werner	23	VIC	Bar Manager	Eliminated 23 May
Jess Hall	28	NSW	Travel Agent	Eliminated 20 May
Mandy Hall	51	SA	Stay-at-home Mum	Eliminated 16 May
Monica Mignone	27	VIC	Primary School Teacher	Eliminated 13 May
Yossra Abouelfadl	36	NSW	Pharmacist	Eliminated 9 May
Dee Williams	37	NSW	Office Manager	Eliminated 6 May
Huda Al-Sultan	34	SA	Dietician	Eliminated 5 May

Future appearances

- Tessa Boersma and Simon Toohey appeared on Series 12. Simon was eliminated on 7 June 2020, finishing 11th and Tessa was eliminated on 28 June 2020, finishing 7th.
- Tessa and Simon appeared in Series 16 along with Tim Bone, Tati Carlin and Mandy Hall as guests for the 1st service challenge.
- Tim along with Steph De Sousa appeared on Series 17. Steph was eliminated on 11 May 2025, finishing 21st and Tim was eliminated on 1 June 2025, finishing 16th.

== Guest chefs ==
Week	Guest Chef	Challenge
1	Sashi Cheliah	Auditions Part 1
1	Curtis Stone	Immunity Challenge
2	Darren Purchese	Pressure Test
2	Max Sharrad	Immunity Challenge
3 (Nigella Week)	Nigella Lawson	All Challenges & MasterClass
3 (Nigella Week)	Coskun Uysal	Immunity Challenge
4 (Legends Week)	Rick Stein	Mystery Box Challenge
4 (Legends Week)	Clare Smyth	Pressure Test
4 (Legends Week)	Donovan Cooke	Immunity Challenge
4 (Legends Week)	Yotam Ottolenghi	Team Challenge & Elimination Challenge
5 (Secrets Week)	Edward Yulianto	Mystery Box Challenge
5 (Secrets Week)	Leno Lattarulo	Pressure Test
5 (Secrets Week)	Andy Allen	Immunity Challenge
5 (Secrets Week)	Rosa Mitchell	Team Challenge
5 (Secrets Week)	Olimpia Bortolotto	Team Challenge
6 (Queensland Week)	Shannon Kellam	Pressure Test
6 (Queensland Week)	Ben Williamson	Immunity Challenge
6 (Queensland Week)	Elena Duggan	Team Challenge
6 (Queensland Week)	Ash Martin	MasterClass
7	Jessie McTavish	Immunity Challenge
7	Maggie Beer	Team Challenge & Elimination Challenge
8 (Sweet Week)	Heston Blumenthal	Mystery Box Challenge
8 (Sweet Week)	Kate Reid	Pressure Test
8 (Sweet Week)	Alice Wright	Immunity Challenge
9 (Best of the Best Week)	Jock Zonfrillo	Challenge
9 (Best of the Best Week)	Phil Wood	Immunity Challenge
9 (Best of the Best Week)	Massimo Bottura	Elimination Challenge
10	Kirsten Tibballs	Pressure Test
10	Adam D'Sylva	Immunity Challenge
11 (WA Week)	Matt Sartori	Challenge
11 (WA Week)	Dan Gedge	Team Challenge
11 (WA Week)	Santiago Fernandez	Pressure Test
11 (WA Week)	Karl Wulf	MasterClass
12	Ashley Palmer-Watts	Pressure Test
12	Curtis Stone	Team Relay Challenge
Finals	Peter Gilmore	Pressure Test
Finals	Shannon Bennett	Finale Service Challenge

== Elimination chart ==
No.	Week	1		2			3		4		5		6		7		8		9		10		11		Finals			
No.	Mystery Box Challenge Winner	None		Abbey; Derek; Kyle; Tessa			Jess		Larissa		Derek		Simon		Simon		Larissa		Nicole		Derek		Anushka		Larissa		None	
No.	Invention Test Winner	Dee; Joe; Mandy; Tim		None			Blake; Derek; Simon; Steph; Tessa		Abbey; Steph; Tati		Larissa; Sandeep; Tati		Abbey; Anushka; Derek; Nicole		Abbey; Ben; Tessa		Anushka; Ben; Tim		Simon		Christina; Larissa; Simon		Tessa		Simon; Tessa		None	
No.	Immunity Challenge	Win: Tim		Win: Tessa; Lose: Derek			Lose: Simon		Lose: Tati		Win: Sandeep		Lose: Anushka		Win: Tessa		Lose: Tim		Lose: Tessa		Win: Larissa		Win: Nicole		None		None	
1	Larissa	Top 24	IN	Btm 19		Team Lose	Btm 3	Team Win	WIN	Team 2nd	Top 3	Team Lose	Btm 4	Team Win	IN	Btm 3	WIN	Team 2nd	IN	Team Lose	Top 3	Team 2nd	IN	Team Lose/Imm.	WIN	ADV	Top 3	WINNER
2	Tessa	Top 24	IN	Top 3		Team Lose/Imm.	Top 5	Team Win	IN	Team 2nd	IN	Team Win	IN	Team Lose	Top 3	Team Win	IN	Team Lose 1/Imm.	Top 3	Team Win	IN	Team Lose 1	Top 4	Team Win	Top 2	Btm 4	Top 3	Runner-Up
3	Simon	Top 24	IN	Btm 19		Team Lose	Top 5	Team Win	IN	Team Lose	IN	Btm 5	WIN	Btm 4	WIN	Team Lose	Btm 3	Team Lose 2	Top 3	Team Lose	Top 3	Team Lose 2	IN	Team Lose	Top 2	Btm 4	Top 3	Third place
4	Tim	Top 24	Top 4	Btm 23/Imm.		Team Win	IN	Team Win	IN	Team 2nd	IN	Team Win	Elim	Eliminated (Ep 26)		Team Win	Top 3	ADV	IN	Team Win	Btm 3	Btm 2	IN	Team Win	Btm 3	Btm 2	4th	Re-eliminated (Ep 60)
5	Nicole	Top 24	IN	Btm 4		Team Win	IN	Team Lose	IN	Team Win	IN	Team Win	Top 4	Btm 4	Btm 3	Team Win	IN	Team Win	Top 3	Team Win	IN	Team Win	Top 4	ADV	Btm 3	Elim	Eliminated (Ep 59)	
6	Anushka	Top 24	IN	Btm 19		Team Lose	IN	Team Win	IN	Team Lose	Btm 3	Team Win	Top 4	Team Win	IN	Team Lose	Top 3	Team Lose 3	IN	Btm 2	Btm 3	Team 2nd	Top 4	Team Win	Elim	Eliminated (Ep 56)		
7	Christina	Top 24	IN	Btm 19		Btm 4	IN	Team Lose	IN	Team Lose	IN	Team Lose	IN	Team Lose	Btm 3	Btm 3	IN	Team Win	IN	Team Win	Top 3	Team Win	Top 4	Elim	Eliminated (Ep 54)			
8	Derek	Top 24	IN	Top 3		Team Lose	Top 5	Team Lose	Btm 3	Team Win	WIN	Team Win	Top 4	Team Win	IN	Team Win	Btm 3	Team Lose 3	IN	Team Win	WIN	Elim	Eliminated (Ep 49)					
9	Tati	Top 24	IN	Btm 19		Team Win	IN	Btm 5	Top 3	Btm 3	Top 3	Team Win	IN	Team Win	IN	Team Lose	IN	Btm 2	IN	Team Lose	Elim	Eliminated (Ep 46)						
10	Ben	Top 24	IN	Btm 19		Team Win	IN	Team Win	IN	Btm 3	IN	Btm 2	Btm 4	Btm 2	Top 3	Team Win	Top 3	Team 2nd	IN	Elim	Eliminated (Ep 44)							
11	Sandeep	Top 24	IN	Btm 19		Team Lose	IN	Team Win	IN	Team 2nd	Top 3	Team Win	IN	Team Win	IN	DNP/Imm.	IN	Elim	Eliminated (Ep 39)									
12	Steph	Top 24	IN	Btm 19		Team Win	Top 5	Btm 5	Top 3	Team 2nd	IN	Btm 5	Btm 4	Team Lose	IN	Team Win	Elim	Eliminated (Ep 36)										
13	Abbey	Top 24	IN	WIN		Team Win	Btm 5	Btm 5	Top 3	Team Win	IN	Team Win	Top 4	Team Win	Top 3	Elim	Eliminated (Ep 34)											
14	Walleed	Top 24	IN	Btm 19		Btm 4	IN	Team Lose	IN	Team Win	IN	Team Lose	IN	Team Win	Elim	Eliminated (Ep 31)												
15	Joe	Top 24	Top 4	Btm 19		Team Win	IN	Team Win	IN	Team 2nd	IN	Btm 5	IN	Elim	Eliminated (Ep 29)													
16	Kyle	Top 24	IN	Top 3		Btm 4	IN	Team Win	IN	Team Win	Btm 2	Elim	Eliminated (Ep 24)															
17	Leah	Top 24	IN	Btm 19		Team Win	Btm 5	Team Win	Btm 2	Team Win	Elim	Eliminated (Ep 21)																
18	Blake	Top 24	IN	Btm 19		Team Win	Top 5	Team Lose	IN	Elim	Eliminated (Ep 19)																	
19	Jess	Top 24	IN	Btm 19		Team Win	WIN	Btm 2	Elim	Eliminated (Ep 16)																		
20	Mandy	Top 24	Top 4	Btm 19		Team Win	Btm 3	Elim	Eliminated (Ep 14)																			
21	Monica	Top 24	IN	Btm 19		Team Lose	Elim	Eliminated (Ep 11)																				
22	Yossra	Top 24	IN	Btm 4		Elim	Eliminated (Ep 9)																					
23	Dee	Top 24	Top 4	Elim		Eliminated (Ep 6)																						
24	Huda	Top 24	IN	Elim	Eliminated (Ep 5)																							
	Eliminated			Huda	Dee	Yossra	Monica	Mandy	Jess	Blake	Leah	Kyle	Tim; 1st Elimination	Joe	Walleed	Abbey	Steph	Sandeep	Ben		Tati	Derek	Christina		Anushka	Nicole	Tim; Re-elimination	Simon; 65 points
	Eliminated			Huda	Dee	Yossra	Monica	Mandy	Jess	Blake	Leah	Kyle	Tim; 1st Elimination	Joe	Walleed	Abbey	Steph	Sandeep	Ben		Tati	Derek	Christina		Anushka	Nicole	Tim; Re-elimination	Tessa; 77 points
	Eliminated			Huda	Dee	Yossra	Monica	Mandy	Jess	Blake	Leah	Kyle	Tim; 1st Elimination	Joe	Walleed	Abbey	Steph	Sandeep	Ben		Tati	Derek	Christina		Anushka	Nicole	Tim; Re-elimination	Larissa; 85 points

== Episodes and ratings ==
Colour key:
– Highest rating during the series
– Lowest rating during the series

Ep#/Wk-Ep#	Original airdate	Episode Title/Event	Total viewers (five metro cities)	Nightly Ranking	Ref
Week 1
1/01-1	Monday, 29 April 2019	Series Premiere: Auditions Part 1 – Auditionees had one hour to cook their signature dish to secure their spot in the Top 24. Eighteen hopefuls received aprons with three votes from the judges, and thirteen contestants with one or two "yes" votes had another chance to win the six remaining spots in the competition.	715,000	7	
2/01-2	Tuesday, 30 April 2019	Auditions Part 2 – MasterChef alumni Billie McKay, Matt Sinclair and Poh Ling Yeow guided thirteen hopefuls in their second audition with 75 minutes to cook with their choice of ingredients from one of three pantries selected by each mentor. Each dish was tasted blindly by the judges. During the judging, Dee was the first to advance with her Sri Lankan crab curry. Afterwards, Larissa, Sandeep, Christina, Monica and Leah also succeeded with their dishes and claimed the last five places in the Top 24.	678,000	9	
3/01-3	Wednesday, 1 May 2019	Desert Island Cooking Challenge – In the first cook in the competition, the Top 24 had 75 minutes to prep a dish they would cook if they were on a 'Desert Island'. This week, there were no elimination challenges and the four contestants with standout dishes competed in the first immunity challenge. The cooks who succeeded in that challenge were Dee, Mandy, Joe and Tim.	721,000	6	
4/01-4	Thursday, 2 May 2019	Immunity Challenge: Keeping up with Curtis Stone – To win the first immunity pin, Dee, Mandy, Joe and Tim had to follow steps from Curtis Stone in cooking his steak and chips with broccolini and béarnaise sauce. In the judging, all four impressed but Dee's béarnaise was fatty and lacked mustard seeds while both Joe's and Mandy's steaks were slightly undercooked. Despite mistakenly putting sugar in his sauce, Tim impressed with the other components of his dish and he won the pin.	680,000	6	
Week 2
5/02-1	Sunday, 5 May 2019	Judges' Favourites Mystery Box Challenge & Black Box Elimination Challenge – The Top 24 faced the first Mystery Box Challenge, in which they had 75 minutes to make a dish using at least one of nine ingredients selected by the judges. The Top 5 were Tessa, Tim, Steph, Abbey and Anushka and Abbey was the first to compete for immunity. The other contestants faced another Mystery Box containing black ingredients with 75 minutes to cook. The top three contestants will compete for immunity but the bottom four will be announced and the contestant who cooked the worst dish will be eliminated while the others were sent to tomorrow's Pressure Test. Tim used his immunity pin to skip the challenge. Tessa, Kyle and Derek triumphed and joined Abbey in the Immunity challenge. Yossra, Huda, Nicole and Dee were judged worst. Huda cooked a steak paired with eggplant and a tomato blackberry vinaigrette. Unfortunately, the judges found the steak overcooked while the dish as a whole lacked flavour, and she was eliminated.	638,00	7	
6/02-2	Monday, 6 May 2019	Pressure Test: Darren Purchese's Bombe Alaska – Dee, Nicole and Yossra had to recreate the recipe of Darren Purchese's Bombe Alaska in 45 steps. Nicole impressed despite the lack of tempered chocolate in her caramel ice cream. Yossra won praise for her dish despite her meringue coating being uneven. However, during the cook, Dee's ice cream was too thick, forcing her to remake it but her second take was too eggy and her brownie was too dry and heavy, resulting in her elimination.	607,000	13	
7/02-3	Tuesday, 7 May 2019	Immunity Challenge: Max Sharrad – In the first round, Abbey, Derek, Kyle and Tessa had 45 minutes to cook a fried chicken dish. Both Tessa's buffalo wings and Derek's Korean chicken wings impressed the judges and for the first time, they advanced to the second round, in which they cooked against Max Sharrad, the Young Chef of the Year. In 75 minutes, they chose the orange as the core ingredient for their dishes. Derek's white chocolate orange mousse lacked finesse and he scored 16 points. Max scored 19 points with his kingfish and orange dish but lost to Tessa, who scored 28 points with her pork belly dish and won the immunity pin.	654,000	9	
8/02-4	Wednesday, 8 May 2019	Briagolong Drought Buffet Team Challenge – Two teams cooked a feast for the local farmers and volunteers of disaster relief charity Lions Need for Feed at Briagolong, Victoria with three hours to prep three mains highlighting the core ingredient (meat for the Red Team and seafood for the Blue), three side dishes and one dessert before serving in ten minutes. During the cook, both teams struggled early. The dishes from the Red Team, led by Tim, earned overall praise from the judges. The Blue Team, led by Larissa, also impressed with their dishes, but despite special mentions for Sandeep's prawn curry and Christina's sticky date pudding, the dishes cooked by each team member lacked cohesion as a complete buffet menu, sending them to elimination.	664,000	8	
9/02-5	Thursday, 9 May 2019	Favourite Ingredients Elimination Challenge – After Tessa used her immunity pin to avoid elimination, the other members of the Blue Team had to cook with either their favourite or least favourite ingredient, with the Bottom 4 being sent to the second round. In the second round, Christina, Kyle, Walleed and Yossra had 60 minutes to cook with their remaining ingredient. Yossra struggled to cook with her least favourite ingredient and her white chocolate mousse was heavy, didn't set and was overpowered by the flavour of the orange. The judges agreed that her fellow competitors redeemed themselves from their first round dishes and Yossra was eliminated.	640,000	7	
9/02-6	Thursday, 9 May 2019	Masterclass: George Calombaris, Poh Ling Yeow, Billie McKay, Matt Sinclair and Matt Preston – George, Matt and the mentors presented their dishes to handle the competition: George used this week's mystery box ingredients to make his tortellini with broth, Poh cooked her two desserts using orange selected from the Invention test: a spiced orange brûlée tart and a cocoa pistachio pâté sablée with an orange salad, Billie demonstrated a dish showcasing carrots in four ways, a duck red curry cooked by Matt Sinclair and Matt Preston's five elements recipe in five minutes: flatbread, instant chipotle mayo, pickled jalapeños, microwave salsa and cooked proteins – chicken and prawns.	419,000	16	
Week 3 – Nigella Week
10/03-1	Sunday, 12 May 2019	Nigella's Mystery Box Challenge & Team Relay Invention Test – In the mystery box challenge, the contestants had 75 minutes to make a dish using the following ingredients, selected by Nigella Lawson: mint vanilla bean, lamb mince, whiting, semolina, date molasses, red plums, red witlof and nigella seeds. Jess advanced to the immunity challenge with her pavlova with vanilla and plums. The other four contestants in the Top 5 started the first leg of a team relay invention test, in which they had to cook dishes featuring pistachios. The Yellow Team, led by Simon, succeeded with one savoury dish. The Green and Red Teams, led by Abbey and Nicole, respectively, on the other hand, failed to highlight the nut. During the changeovers, Walleed, the second contestant on the Red Team, changed the dish and mistook star anise as the core ingredient until Kyle, who was last in the cook, salvaged it. The dish lacked balance, but Abbey's poor performance as captain and the Green Team's lack of teamwork led to a dish with technical issues, sending her team straight the pressure test.	573,000	7	
11/03-2	Monday, 13 May 2019	Pressure Test: Nigella's Tarragon French Roast Chicken – The Bottom 5 were given 90 minutes to recreate Nigella's roast chicken with two sides and a sauce of their choice. In the tasting, Leah and Abbey excelled and the latter's dish was the dish of the day. Mandy's side dishes impressed but her sauce did not have enough flavour, while Larissa's fennel was undercooked. Ultimately, it was the combination of Monica's half-cooked potatoes and a bitter sour gravy that eliminated her from the competition.	615,000	13	
12/03-3	Tuesday, 14 May 2019	Immunity Challenge: Coskun Uysal – In the first round, the contestants had 60 minutes to prep a custard dish (sweet or savoury) to compete for immunity. Simon's beat Tessa with his Japanese set custard to cook against guest chef Coskun Uysal. With 75 minutes to cook, Simon selected duck, onion, garlic, bay leaf and peas for his dish. With 60 minutes to cook, Coskun served a roast duck with peas two ways and scored 36 points, while Simon scored 24 points as his duck leg was overcooked.	592,000	12	
13/03-4	Wednesday, 15 May 2019	Historical Three-Course Meal Team Challenge – The contestants were taken to the State Library Victoria, where they were divided into two teams of 10 and given two and a half hours had to recreate two three-course dinners from 20th century royal state receptions in Australia for 80 teachers from Victoria. The Burgundy Team, led by Steph, prepped the menu for Queen Elizabeth II's first visit in 1954 while the Purple Team, led by Kyle, made dishes presented during the coronation of Prince Edward of Wales in May 1920. The Purple Team struggled early with their entrees at prep time, and during service, the whiting in their entrée was inconsistently cooked, but the Burgundy Team had served raw chicken in their main. Despite their efforts to fix it and overall praise for their entrée and dessert, the Burgundy Team was sent to the elimination challenge.	642,000	9	
14/03-5	Thursday, 16 May 2019	Condiments Elimination Challenge – In the first of a two-round elimination challenge, the 10 contestants on the Burgundy Team took turns guessing the names of condiments in front of them. Abbey, Jess, Mandy, Steph and Tati, with incorrect guesses, were sent to the second round, in which they had 60 minutes to make a condiment that complemented their dish. While Abbey, Steph and Tati were announced safe, Jess and Mandy faced elimination. Jess' sweet potato dumplings impressed in the judging but had issues with the texture of the filling. Mandy served a peri-peri chicken with roasted cabbage. While her peri-peri sauce earned praise, the rest of the components of her dish were too greasy and failed to highlight her sauce, and Mandy was eliminated.	636,000	7	
14/03-6	Thursday, 16 May 2019	Masterclass: Gary Mehigan, Nigella Lawson and Matt Preston – The remaining contestants attended their second MasterClass from Nigella and the judges at Fresh Select Farm in Werribee. The judges presented their recipes: Gary's Thai fish larb and Matt's vegetable lasagne. Nigella, with help from George, cooked her two favourite recipes: chilli mint lamb cutlets with mint and preserved lemon sauce, and sticky toffee pudding.	415,000	16	
Week 4 – Legends Week
15/04-1	Sunday, 19 May 2019	Rick Stein's Mystery Box Challenge & Fish and Potatoes Invention Test – Famed chefs made guest appearances in each challenge for this week. Rick Stein brought his Mystery Box with ingredients for the contestants. Larissa was the first to advance to the immunity challenge with her grilled cuttlefish with bone marrow puree and tomato sugo. In the 75-minute Invention Test, the remaining cooks had to make a dish featuring fish and potatoes. Abbey, Steph and Tati excelled and joined Larissa in the immunity challenge. Derek, Leah and Jess fell short with their dishes and were sent to the pressure test.	630,000	6	
16/04-2	Monday, 20 May 2019	Pressure Test: Clare Smyth's Pear and Lemon Verbena Vacherin – Clare Smyth gave Derek, Jess and Leah four hours to replicate her intricate dessert, consisting of meringue, pears and a lemon verbena and 10 minutes to plate it. Derek made the best dish and Leah also impressed but her pear discs were too thin. Jess' meringue was fragile and thin, while her cream was loose, and her dish had collapsed after plating, resulting in her elimination.	600,000	14	
17/04-3	Tuesday, 21 May 2019	Immunity Challenge: Donovan Cooke – Abbey, Larissa, Steph and Tati had 45 minutes to cook a dish using one of three commercial appliances: a sandwich press, an electric kettle or a microwave. Donovan Cooke returned to cook against Tati who won the first round. She selected chilis from the garden to cook her dish with. In 75 minutes, Tati cooked a Thai green grilled spatchcock with pumpkin and coconut, but in the tasting, the dish received mixed reviews for the presentation and cohesion. Donovan won with his whiting, mussels and chili dish and scored 27 points, while Tati scored 21.	618,000	9	
18/04-4	Wednesday, 22 May 2019	Street Food Service Challenge – The contestants were divided into three teams of six and took responsibility for serving three international street foods (two proteins and one vegetarian) to 120 customers, the judges and Yotam Ottolenghi at HWKR Food Centre in Melbourne. The Yellow Team, led by Nicole, served Mexican food, the Green Team, led by Simon, cooked Indian food and the Blue Team, led by Tessa, prepped Malaysian dishes. In 90 minutes, all teams struggled, but Nicole was able to manage her team to finish before service. Despite minor reviews on their last dish, the other dishes stood out and the team was pronounced safe. The Blue Team had problems with their nasi goreng as the rice was claggy and the sambal was not cooked enough while their beef satays had mixed reviews. However, the Green Team fared worse throughout the cook with all of their dishes - they stumbled early on in the prep and in service, their tandoori chicken was too salty, the vegetarian samosas did not have a flavoursome sauce and they forgot to prep the rice for their fish curry.	634,000	8	
19/04-5	Thursday, 23 May 2019	Deli Items Elimination Challenge – In a two-round elimination challenge, the six contestants on the Green Team took turns naming different deli items, with the first three to choose incorrectly going to the second round. Ben, Blake and Tati were then given 60 minutes to cook a dish using the ingredients that were correctly identified in the first round. In the judging, Tati's laksa won overall praise. The judges thought Ben's cheeseboard was not properly executed, but while Blake impressed with his beef, his potato puree was too sticky while the other components of his dish didn't meet the mark, which resulted in his elimination.	680,000	6	
Week 5 – Secrets Week
20/05-1	Sunday, 26 May 2019	Dumpling Box Challenge & Top Secret Invention Test – The daily challenges this week remained in secrecy for the contestants to determine the objectives. Din Tai Fung restaurant chef Edward Yulianto taught the cooks how to make dumplings for their first challenge. In the 75 minute challenge, Christina and Derek produced two standout dumplings over Anushka, Joe and Tati. The judges selected Derek by split decision to advance to the immunity challenge. The other contestants had to cook another dish to secure one of the three remaining spots in the immunity challenge. Tati, Larissa and Sandeep all succeeded but Anushka, Leah and Kyle failed to deliver, sending them to the pressure test.	644,000	7	
21/05-2	Monday, 27 May 2019	Pressure Test: Leno Lattarulo's Seafood Paella – Anushka, Kyle and Leah had 90 minutes to decipher and recreate Leno Latturlo's paella without a recipe. Anushka presented the best dish. Leah's fish was cooked well but her rice was inconsistently cooked while Kyle's seafood was nicely cooked but there was way too much rice in his dish. However, there was one thing that none of the judges could looked past and that was the burnt taste of rice that tangy everything in the pan. Ultimately the judges felt that Leah had missed the brief and she was eliminated.	651,000	13	
22/05-3	Tuesday, 28 May 2019	Immunity Challenge: Secret Chef – The judges presented their favorite sauces for Derek, Larissa, Sandeep and Tati to use with their dishes in the 60-minute first round. Sandeep's used Matt Preston's tamarind and chipotle ketchup for his lobster masala to win and cook against the guest chef, who was revealed during the 60-minute cook. Lemons were chosen from the citrus fruits on offer, with 75 minutes to cook a dish.The guest chef was revealed to be season 4 winner Andy Allen who cooked a confit squid with adobo sauce and corn salsa, but he lost to a perfect score of 30 points from Sandeep with his lemon pepper chicken with lemon rice and raita, earning him the immunity pin. Andy Allen's score was kept secret, but was revealed on Facebook to be 24.	611,000	10	
23/05-4	Wednesday, 29 May 2019	Italian Four-Course Meal Service Challenge – The two teams had to cook a four-course Italian menu for 80 guests led by Rosa Mitchell of Rosa's Cantina for Abbey's Red team (Abbey, Anushka, Derek, Nicole, Sandeep, Tati, Tessa and Tim) and Olimpia Bortolotto from Cecconi's for Christina's Green team (Christina, Larissa, Steph, Ben, Joe, Kyle, Simon, Ben and Walleed). During prep time, the Red team decided to cook a beef cheeks dish despite Rosa's suggestion for the main and guessed the ratios of their panna cottas for dessert while the Green team struggled to prep their pasta for the entrée. Their dishes impressed in the tasting but their calamari dish for the appetizer had issues and against the overall praise of the Red team's dishes, Christina's Green team found themselves in elimination.	648,000	9	
24/05-5	Thursday, 30 May 2019	Blind Taste Test Elimination Challenge – The contestants had to guess an ingredient while blindfolded. Ben, Joe, Kyle, Simon and Steph had 60 minutes to cook their dishes in the second round while the judges tasted each dish blindly after the cook. Simon's lamb dish earned praise in its technicality, Joe's dish earned praise in the flavours despite his pasta being too thick, Steph's tart also won praise while Ben's sambal prawns was least impressive and Kyle's pumpkin was too firm and his pork ribs are not braised enough. Afterwards, the other three are announced safe leaving Ben and Kyle as the bottom two. However, with an undercooked pork and a raw pumpkin, Kyle was eliminated from the competition.	633,000	8	
Week 6 – Queensland Week
25/06-1	Sunday, 2 June 2019	Brisbane Box Challenge & Howard Smith Wharves Food Truck Challenge – For their first challenge in Queensland, the contestants were taken to Howard Smith Wharves in Brisbane, where they had 60 minutes to cook a dish using a mystery box filled with native Queensland ingredients. Tati, Abbey, Tessa and Nicole all delivered impressive dishes as the Top 5, and Simon won with his crab salad and advanced to the immunity challenge. In the invention test, the remaining cooks were divided into pairs: the Dark Green Team, consisting of Walleed and Joe, the Red Team, consisting of Abbey and Derek, the Maroon Team, consisting of Larissa and Steph, the Green Team, consisting of Tati and Sandeep, the Blue Team, consisting of Anushka and Nicole, the Yellow Team, consisting of Tessa and Christina, and the Purple Team, consisting of Ben and Tim, tasked with running food trucks, and given two and a half hours to prepare dishes costing $7.50 and $5. The teams raised over $5000 for SecondBite. Abbey and Derek delivered the best dishes while Nicole and Anushka raised the most at $1,045, and both teams advanced to the immunity challenge with Simon. Christina and Tessa's dishes were not executed properly, while Tati and Sandeep struggled and their chili dish was too thin, but the other teams fared worse throughout the cook – Larissa and Steph set their ovens for their food truck on fire, leaving them with no food to serve. Raising the least money, they were sent to the pressure test. Tim and Ben, who delivered two disappointing dishes, joined them.	621,000	8	
26/06-2	Monday, 3 June 2019	Pressure Test: Shannon Kellam's Chocolate de Passion – Larissa, Steph, Tim & Ben had to recreate Shannon Kellam's intricate chocolate dessert based on memory from the demonstration prior to the cook. Although she faced a few issues before the end of the challenge, Larissa excelled with her presentation and outstanding flavours of her dish, and her dessert was the dish of the day. Steph also impressed the judges with her take on the dish. In the end, although Ben had issues with flavour and his chocolate work, Tim had too many technical errors in his dish and he was eliminated.	681,000	11	
27/06-3	Tuesday, 4 June 2019	Immunity Challenge: Ben Williamson – In the first round, Abbey, Anushka, Nicole, Derek & Simon all had to cook a dish that heroed ginger. Anushka won the challenge with her chicken and prawn dumplings with ginger broth, and she moved to the second round, in which she cooked against chef Ben Williamson. Anushka chose the pineapple to hero and cooked a pineapple lemon cake that scored her 19 points as the pineapple flavour was not strong enough. Ben made a salad dish that heroed thelemon myrtle and he scored 25 points, so Anushka did not win the pin.	635,000	10	
28/06-4	Wednesday, 5 June 2019	Noosa Barbecue Feast Team Challenge – In the Noosa Surf Club Restaurant BBQ Challenge, the Blue Team, led by Walleed and consisting of Tati, Sandeep, Larissa, Derek, Anushka and Abbey, and the Green Team, led by Joe and consisting of Ben, Simon, Nicole, Tessa, Christina and Steph, had to make two meat dishes and two side dishes for 150 diners each to be combined and served on a single plate. On the Blue Team, Abbey's Turmeric Garlic Prawns stole the show and although their lamb was inconsistently cooked and Walleed's leadership was questioned, they received high praise and they won the challenge. On the Green Team, although their beef, eggplant and mushroom salad and betel leaves salad, which the judges thought the taste of Queensland went well, their prawns were not only missed the flavour of ginger that they promised but also well and truly overcooked, landed them in elimination.	531,000	15	
29/06-5	Thursday, 6 June 2019	Seafood Elimination Challenge – The first of a two-round seafood elimination challenge was a skills test, in which the seven contestants on the Green Team had to peel prawns, fillet and debone a snapper, and take the tail out of two bugs. The three contestants that did the best job were safe and the other four went into round 2. The three safe contestants were Tessa, Steph and Christina. The other four had to create a seafood platter using the seafood they prepared. Nicole and Simon made exceptional dishes and they were saved. Ben's ceviche did not have enough heat and acidity, but Joe's seafood platter was inconsistently cooked, and he was eliminated.	564,000	9	
29/06-6	Thursday, 6 June 2019	MasterClass: Ash Martin at The Homage, Spicers Hidden Vale – The contestants participated in their third masterclass at the Homage Restaurant, located within the Spicers Hidden Vale resort, with head chef Ash Martin. Ash cooked, showcasing local and sustainably sourced Queensland produce, charred yabbies and smoked damper on the Homage's trademark smokehouse coal pits. The judges also cooked a number of dishes, with Matt demonstrating a 'chocolate torte with rum and chilli' and a 'steamed pudding with ginger marmalade', Gary created a 'curry two ways' and George made a 'surf and turf' all using local produce.	366,000	20	
Week 7
30/07-1	Sunday, 9 June 2019	'Everything Mystery Box' Challenge and Whole Ingredients Invention Test – In the mystery box challenge, the contestants had to use all of the items in the box, which consisted of extra virgin olive oil, Greek yoghurt, brussels sprouts, lamb rack, rosemary, lemon, leeks and parsnips. Only the top three dishes, Derek, Tessa and Simon's, were chosen for tasting, with Simon's being declared the winner and he advanced to the immunity challenge. In the invention test, the other contestants were asked to make a dish that featured every part of a chosen ingredient. Abbey, Ben and Tessa produced standout dishes, sending them through to immunity. Waleed, Nicole and Christina, who each had major flaws in their respective dishes, were sent to the elimination challenge.	489,000	7	
31/07-2	Monday, 10 June 2019	Lucky Dip Elimination Challenge and Second Chance Cook-Off – Nicole, Christina and Walleed had to blindly choose a protein and a side ingredient to pair in their dish. Christina impressed the judges with her Chinese-inspired Duck and Spinach Broth, earning high praise and being announced safe. Although Nicole had issues with the grape in her rabbit and grape dish, Walleed completely missed the point of his artichokes, leaving out the heart and was therefore eliminated. All the eliminated contestants, including Walleed, had the opportunity to win their way back into the competition. They all had to create a dish using a pair of ingredients from the selection in the previous elimination challenge. The top 4 dishes belonged to Yossra, Jess, Kyle and Tim, and Tim won his spot in the competition.	674,000	11	
32/07-3	Tuesday, 11 June 2019	Immunity Challenge: Jesse McTavish – Abbey, Ben, Simon & Tessa awoke to a letter from the judges containing instructions to visit Coles to buy one fresh ingredient for round one of the immunity challenge. The contestants had to use three of the chosen ingredients in a dish. The winner, Tessa, cooked off against Jesse McTavish from North Bondi Fish. Tessa chose to hero cheese and onion over salt and vinegar. Jesse made an onion soup with croutons and scored 22 points from the judges but it was no match for Tessa's Cheese and Onion Mille-feuille that wowed the judges, scoring her 27 out of 30 and earning her the immunity pin.	655,000	10	
33/07-4	Wednesday, 12 June 2019	Picnic at Hanging Rock Team Challenge – The contestants were taken to Hanging Rock, Victoria, where they Maggie Beer and the judges instruct two teams, the Red Team, consisting of Anushka, Simon, Tati, Larissa, Christina and Abbey, and the Green Team, consisting of Tim, Ben, Tessa, Steph, Nicole and Derek, who had three hours to assemble 25 picnic baskets containing a savoury dish, sandwich, salad, dip dish and a dessert for 100 picnickers. The Red team under Anushka's captaincy struggled in prep time and served their dishes late. Their dishes were well received but were uninspired while their frittatas and salads had too many ingredients. Against the overall praise of the dishes of Derek's Green team, Anushka's poor leadership dragged the Red team to elimination.	731,000	6	
34/07-5	Thursday, 13 June 2019	Herbs and Spices Elimination Challenge – Sandeep, who couldn't participate in the team challenge, used his immunity pin to avoid elimination. The first round required the losing team members to cook dishes featuring herbs. Abbey, Christina and Larissa, who served undercooked dishes, were sent into the second round to feature spices. Christina was first to be declared safe with her mussels dish featuring turmeric. Larissa also impressed with her ginger dessert but despite an impressive run, Abbey's dish did not feature enough spices, her fried calamari was too fatty and it was her overuse of the oil in the dish that was her undoing. Ultimately, the judges felt that Abbey had missed the brief, and she was sent home.	663,000	6	
Week 8 – Sweet Week
35/08-1	Sunday, 16 June 2019	Heston's Mystery Box Challenge & Cereal Invention Test – The Top 12 faced a mystery box challenge, in which they had to make a dessert using ingredients selected by Heston Blumenthal. Larissa beat Tessa and Steph to advance in the immunity challenge while the other contestants had to make another dessert featuring cereals. Ben, Anushka and Tim excelled, but Derek, Steph and Simon faltered during the cook and produced desserts with technical errors. They were sent to the pressure test, which was announced to be a two-day challenge.	605,000	7	
36/08-2	Monday, 17 June 2019	Two-Day Pressure Test: Kate Reid's Black Forrest Lune Croissant – The bottom three had 90 minutes to replicate Kate Reid's croissant on the first day and bake it before garnishing it on the next day. During the tasting, Simon's croissant won praise. Although Derek left out the tempered chocolate, his croissant was baked well. The judges were impressed with Steph's dish but the frangipane was undercooked. While she nailed the presentation, it was not enough to keep her safe, and this outweighed Derek's missing chocolate and Steph was eliminated.	648,000	7	
37/08-3	Tuesday, 18 June 2019	Immunity Challenge: Alice Wright – Larissa, Ben, Anushka and Tim had to make ice cream cones for the judges and Poh. Anushka, Ben and Tim all made impressive ice cream cones but Tim's stood out from the pack. He not only got a chance to cook for immunity, but he won a place in the Top 10. In Round 2, Tim cooked off against Alice Wright and they had to hero one nut; from a selection of nuts, Tim chose walnuts. Tim's fig and walnut dessert scored him 19 points, but it was no match for Alice's apple walnut and mascarpone dessert which scored her 26 points, and therefore Tim did not win the pin.	648,000	10	
38/08-4	Wednesday, 19 June 2019	Blind Pairing Team Challenge – The remaining contestants (minus Tim who already secured his place in the Top 10) had to cook in pairs with a wall dividing each pair. Their challenge was to cook two identical dishes in look and taste. The teams were the Green Team (Tati & Tessa), Red Team (Nicole & Christina), Blue Team (Larissa & Ben), Purple Team (Simon & Sandeep) and Yellow Team (Anushka & Derek). The Red Team won and the blue team was also declared safe advancing them into the Top 10 sending the other teams into elimination.	713,000	6	
39/08-5	Thursday, 20 June 2019	Sugar-Free Elimination Challenge – Anushka, Derek, Simon, Sandeep and Tati had to create a dessert without sugar after Tessa used her pin to advance to the Top 10. Sandeep cooked a rice kheer with puri but the dish was average. The judges found the saffron overpowered the pudding while the bread was uncooked and Tati's dish was way too sweet. After Derek, Anushka and Simon won praise with their dishes, the judges had a split decision: Gary thought Tati should have go, Matt thought it should have been Sandeep and the final decision was down to George. In a close decision, Sandeep was sent home for missing the brief of the challenge.	652,000	5	
Week 9 – The Best of the Best Week
40/09-1	Sunday, 23 June 2019	Best-Selling Mystery Box Challenge & Best-Loved Invention Test – There was no pressure test this week and no bottom three in the invention test. The Top 10 had to cook with a mystery box filled with Coles' best-selling ingredients. Although Derek's dish impressed the judges, Nicole beat him and won the challenge, advancing to the immunity challenge. In the invention test, the contestants had to hero one of three of Australia's most loved foods: Milo, Vegemite and tomato sauce. Larissa and Tati both impressed with their dishes, but Simon won the challenge to advance to the immunity challenge with Nicole.	619,000	8	
41/09-2	Monday, 24 June 2019	Jock Zonfrillo's Challenge – In this challenge, each of the eight contestants were given an indigenous ingredient chosen by Jock Zonfrillo to feature in their dish. The winner of the challenge would join Simon and Nicole in this week's immunity challenge. The indigenous ingredients are Christina (Dorrigo pepper), Ben (white currants), Anushka (Lilly Pilly), Tati (aniseed myrtle), Tessa (native lemongrass), Derek (long yams), Larissa (lemon-scented tea tree) and Tim (native basil). Larissa stood out by making the only dessert and although it wowed the judges, Tessa's dish was deemed best by the judges and she won the challenge.	684,000	9	
42/09-3	Tuesday, 25 June 2019	Immunity Challenge: Phil Wood – In the first round Tessa, Nicole and Simon had to cook with Beluga Caviar, the world's best ingredient. All three made standout dishes but Tessa won the first round and was given a choice of food pairings for both her and Phil Wood. She chose beef and onion. Her dish wowed the judges who deemed it a restaurant worthy dish. She scored 27 but Phil Wood scored 30 points, making him the winner of the challenge.	581,000	11	
43/09-4	Wednesday, 26 June 2019	Best Diners Team Challenge – The contestants, led by Christina of the Green team and Larissa of the Yellow, had to cook a four-course meal for 40 diners featuring Delicious magazine's 2018 picks for Australia's best produce: Holy Goat Cheese's goat and cow milk cheese, coral trout from Mark Eather Seafood, Wagyu beef from Mayura Station, and Golden Delicious apples from Moonacres Farm. Both teams struggled during prep but managed to finish in time to serve the diners who were revealed to be the contestants' loved ones. The Green team's dishes earned praise, but their apple dessert was overpowered by the cinnamon ice cream. However, it was the Yellow team's undercooked wagyu that sent them to elimination.	752,000	5	
44/09-5	Thursday, 27 June 2019	Food Waste Management Elimination Challenge – Anushka, Ben, Larissa, Simon and Tati faced a challenge set by Massimo Bottura on minimising waste cooking with the four most-discarded ingredients in Australian homes. Tati, Simon and Larissa made the three best dishes, and the bottom two were Ben and Anushka. Anushka did not showcase technique in her dish and it did not have enough flavour, but Ben wasted half of his duck. Not only did he fail to meet the brief but his dish was undercooked, resulting in his elimination.	626,000	6	
Week 10
45/10-1	Sunday, 30 June 2019	Déjà Vu Mystery Box & Memories Invention Test – The Top 9 were each given one of the previous mystery boxes at random to use for their mystery box challenge. Simon, Larissa and Derek were chosen as the top-3 and all had perfect dishes but Derek stood out and won after using the Everything box from Week 7. In the invention test the remaining eight had to cook a dish inspired by a moment in time. Larissa, Christina and Simon stood out with their dishes and joined Derek in the Immunity Challenge. Tessa, Tim, Tati, Anushka, and Nicole all had problems with their dishes but in the end, Anushka, Tati and Tim were named as the bottom-3 to face elimination.	532,000	8	
46/10-2	Monday, 1 July 2019	Pressure Test: Kirsten Tibballs' Apple Pie – Anushka, Tati and Tim had three and a half hours to recreate Kirsten Tibballs' apple pie. All three struggled but Tim's pie was the dish of the day, and the final verdict was between Tati and Anushka. They both overcooked their crust, but it was Tati who took her caramel too far and created a bitter taste that overpowered the other component of her dish. These flaws eliminated Tati.	655,000	11	
47/10-3	Tuesday, 2 July 2019	Immunity Challenge: Adam D'Sylva – Derek, Christina, Larissa and Simon had to create a dish with chicken as the main ingredient using an assigned cuisine: Simon (Spanish), Christina (French), Derek (Vietnamese) and Larissa (Japanese). Larissa and Derek had the two best dishes with Larissa advancing to the second round to cook off against Adam D'Sylva. Her advantage was to pick any ingredients from an open pantry but they had to all fit in one basket. Larissa relied on strategy to win and chose sweet ingredients such as corn, popcorn, cornflakes, curry leaves, blackberry. Adam scored three sixes totaling his score to 18. Larissa got three sevens, giving her a total score of 21 and the immunity pin.	645,000	9	
48/10-4	Wednesday, 3 July 2019	The Q Train Team Challenge – The eight contestants had to cook in a Q Train Challenge, with Larissa and Anushka (Purple Team), Derek and Simon (Green Team), Nicole and Christina (Yellow Team), and Tessa and Tim (Maroon Team). They each had to cook one course of a 4-course vegetarian meal with fresh produce for 30 diners, to be plated and served on the train between stops. Both the Purple and Yellow Teams won the challenge after impressing with their dishes, sending the other two teams to elimination.	654,000	7	
49/10-5	Thursday, 4 July 2019	The Time Auction Elimination Challenge – Tessa, Simon, Derek and Tim competed in the MasterChef time auction where they had to bid for ingredients with time rather than money. The more time they spent buying ingredients, the less time they had to cook. Tessa spent 50 minutes on John Dory fish, citrus and herbs, Simon spent 75 minutes on a lamb rack, root vegetables and spices, Derek spent 80 minutes on eggs, onions, and sauces and Tim spent 90 minutes on a pork belly, nightshades and spreads. Both Tessa and Simon impressed the judges with their dishes and they were declared safe, while Tim was criticized for undercooking his pork belly. But Derek faltered under pressure, attempting to make quail's egg yolk ravioli for the first time. It did not work out, so he quickly turned his pasta dough into fettuccine and made an onion sauce, topping it with a sous vide duck egg he had cooked as a backup. It was not enough, and Derek was eliminated.	606,000	8	
Week 11 – Western Australia Week
50/11-1	Sunday, 7 July 2019	Western Australia Mystery Box & Surf and Turf Invention Test – The Top 7 traveled to Western Australia, where they were then taken to the Optus Stadium in Perth, for the mystery box challenge, in which they had one hour to make a dish using nine famous ingredients from WA, and Anushka won the Mystery Box. In the invention test, the other contestants had one hour to make a dish with meat and seafood both, and Tessa won. The judges also announced that this week one contestant would advance straight to Finals Week and only one person would be eliminated.	638,000	6	
51/11-2	Monday, 8 July 2019	Wildflower Five-course Degustation challenge – The five remaining contestants had to cook one course of a five-course degustation meal at the Wildflower, under its head chef, with an assigned ingredient. Nicole cooked the first course with baby beetroots, Simon cooked the second course with marron, Christina made the third course with duck, Tim made the fourth course with finger limes and Larissa presented the last course with plum. Nicole and Christina made the best courses and joined Tessa and Anushka in the immunity challenge.	606,000	10	
52/11-3	Tuesday, 9 July 2019	Fast-Track to Finals Week Challenge - In the first round, each contestant was given a car and the address of a local shop to choose their feature ingredient. Nicole chose honey, Christina picked almonds, Anushka selected blue cheese and Tessa chose 70% dark chocolate. Nicole and Tessa beat Anushka and Christina to advance the second round. Tessa cooked the best dish in the first round and hence chose the feature ingredient for the second round. In the second round, both of them cooked with Red Spangled Emperor; Nicole won and advanced to Finals Week.	630,000	9	
53/11-4	Wednesday, 10 July 2019	Leeuwin Estate Team Challenge – The other six contestants were split into two teams and had to cook a main course and dessert for 25 diners. The Yellow Team was faster in service while the Green Team forgot to serve 12 plates of their main course. The lamb in the Yellow Team's main was perfectly cooked but insufficiently reduced, while their dessert was loved by the judges. However, the Green Team main course did not have enough salt and acidity, while their dessert had an unnecessary smokiness, too much sweetness, and an overbaked cookie. Thus, the Yellow Team joined Nicole in Finals Week, and the Green Team was sent to the pressure test.	555,000	11	
54/11-5	Thursday, 11 July 2019	Two-Dish Pressure Test: Santiago Fernandez – Larissa used her immunity pin to avoid elimination. In the pressure test, set by head chef Santiago Fernandez, Simon and Christina had three and a half hours to cook two of Santiago's dishes, one savoury and one sweet, at the same time. Simon and Christina did well on their savory dishes, but while Christina's sauce was too salty, Simon's dish was the dish of the day. However, he did not present a tuile on his dessert as he ran out of time. Christina's dessert looked beautiful and her ice cream was delicious, but her espuma was inedible. In the end, Christina was eliminated.	9		
54/11-6	Thursday, 11 July 2019	MasterClass: Karl Wulf on Rottnest Island – The contestants visited Rottnest Island for their last MasterClass, and they were joined by Chef Karl Wulf from Thomson's and Pinky's Beach Club at Discovery Rottnest Island. Using Rottnest's produce, Karl cooked some fresh caught crayfish, with a kafir lime dressing, salt bush and seaweed butter. The judges also cooked their own dishes, with Matt showing contestants simple steps to cook 'Pumpkin Three Ways', George cooked 'Halloumi with Quince Chutney Puree' and Gary returned to his roots with his 'French Pheasant, Mashed Potato & Cabbage'.	394,000	17	
Week 12 – Finals Week
55/12-1	Sunday, 14 July 2019	Ingredient from Home Mystery Box & Judges Choice Invention Test – In the last Mystery Box challenge, the contestants were each sent an ingredient from home and a handwritten letter from their loved ones, and Larissa won the challenge. In the invention test, the judges handpicked ingredients for each contestant. Simon and Tessa joined Larissa while Nicole, Tim and Anushka were in the Bottom 3.	605,000	6	
56/12-2	Monday, 15 July 2019	Pressure Test: Ashley Palmer-Watts' Lamington Cake – Anushka, Nicole and Tim had four hours to recreate Ashley Palmer-Watts' lamington cake. Nicole stood out with her dish. The time pressure got to Anushka and that, combined with some technical difficulties with her dish, sent her home.	667,000	12	
57/12-3	Tuesday, 16 July 2019	"No Rules" Challenge – The Top 5 contestants were asked to cook "the one dish" they wanted to cook with no rules, an open pantry and a time limit to be decided by them. Nicole and Tim's dishes were good but Larissa won the challenge, giving her an advantage in the next day's challenge.	649,000	8	
58/12-4	Wednesday, 17 July 2019	The Press Club Service Challenge – The contestants cooked the last service in George's flagship restaurant, The Press Club, for all former and present employees. They had to cook a five-course tasting menu using George's favourite ingredients. Since Larissa won the previous challenge, she got to choose which course and ingredient she wanted to cook with. Tessa cooked the first course using capers, Tim cooked the second course using olives, Simon made the third using lentils, Larissa made the fourth using lemons, and Nicole cooked the last course using honey. Larissa won and advanced straight to the semi-finals. Tessa and Tim came in second and third, respectively, and got an advantage in the elimination challenge.	719,000	6	
Grand Finale Week
59/13-1	Sunday, 21 July 2019	Three-Round 'Duel' Elimination – Tim, Tessa, Simon and Nicole had to cook off against each other in pairs. Having won 2nd and 3rd place, respectively, in the last challenge, Tessa and Tim got to pick a pantry. Tessa picked the Asian pantry and Nicole cooked off against her. Tim chose the farmhouse pantry cooked against Simon. Simon and Tessa won the first round and joined Larissa in the semi-finals. Next, Tim and Nicole cooked against each other using the sweet pantry. Tim won, and Nicole was eliminated.	648,000	5	
59/13-2	Sunday, 21 July 2019	MasterClass: Contestants vs. Judges and Mentors -In the first round George, Gary and Curtis Stone competed in a Mystery Box challenge. All three dishes were outstanding, but ultimately George win with his "Tea by George". In the second round the top 4 competed against the season mentors, Poh, Billie and Matt, heroing coconuts. The mentors made a curry dish and the Top 4 a dessert. Both dish were outstanding, and the judges declared it a tie.	548,000	8	
60/13-3	Monday, 22 July 2019	Semi-Finals Pressure Test: Peter Gilmore – Tim, Tessa, Simon and Larissa had two hours to recreate Peter Gilmore's white coral dessert, which replaced the snow egg dessert at his restaurant after 10 years, and the three contestants with the best dishes moved into the Grand Finale. Tessa struggled during the cook, but in the tasting, her dessert was considered Dish of the Day, as her coral was the best and all her flavors and textures were excellent. Peter said her white coral could be served in his restaurant. Simon was the second contestant into the Grand Finale. He had to remake his oloroso custard, but all of the components in his dish were excellent too. Larissa had various problems during the cook. Her coral was a little dense, but the other components of her dessert. were spot-on, and her prune ice-cream was considered the best. Tim made a very dense coral, and the other components of his dish had technical issues, so he was eliminated, and Larissa, advanced to the Finale.	742,000	7	
61/13-4	Tuesday, 23 July 2019	Grand Finale – Tessa, Simon and Larissa competed in a three-course service challenge, in which they cooked for 60 VIP diners, including guest chefs and MasterChef alumni, with Shannon Bennett as their mentor. All three of them struggled during the cook, but ultimately succeeded. Simon did not have enough points in the service challenge, with a score of 65/90, making it a competition between Tessa and Larissa. Tessa became the runner-up with a score of 77/90. Larissa won with an impressive score of 85/90. Her dessert, a Szechuan Pavlova with Beetroot and Blackberry, scored a full complement of 30/30 points.	831,000	7	
61/13-4	Tuesday, 23 July 2019	Winner Announced – Larissa Takchi announced as the winner of the eleventh season of MasterChef Australia, receiving the grand prize of $250,000, monthly column in Delicious magazine and a new Holden Equinox. Tessa Boersma earned a cash prize of $30,000 as the runner-up while Simon Toohey received a cash prize of $20,000 after finishing in third place.	992,000	3	
