= Flynn McGarry =

American chef based in New York City (born 1998)

- Born: November 25, 1998 (age 27)
- Culinary career
- Cooking style: New American
- Current restaurant
- Gem (New York City)
- Website: www.gem-nyc.com

Flynn McGarry (born November 25, 1998) is an American chef based in New York City. He has been called the "Justin Bieber of food" and is known for hosting dinner tasting restaurant Eureka in Los Angeles and New York City since he was 11. He has staged at Eleven Madison Park, Alinea, Next, Geranium, and Maaemo. McGarry describes his cooking as modern American cuisine. He is known for being a young restaurant owner in NYC, opening the successful restaurant Gem at age 19.

== Early life ==
McGarry is the son of Meg and Will McGarry. His maternal grandfather was comedian Larry Daniels.

McGarry grew interested in cooking after tiring of his parents' limited cooking repertoire and the takeout food they would frequently eat. He cooked through Thomas Keller's The French Laundry Cookbook and learned cooking skills from YouTube videos and food blogs. His parents built a kitchen in his bedroom to help him practice and installed a vacuum sealer, induction burners, a binchōtan grill and an immersion circulator. McGarry started home-schooling in the seventh grade so that he could have more time to practice cooking. When he was 12, McGarry started the US$160-a-head Eureka dining club in Los Angeles.

== Career ==
At sixteen years old, McGarry finished his high school examinations and moved to New York City, where he opened his own pop-up restaurant, Eureka NYC, in the West Village. The only chef at Eureka NYC, McGarry cooks a 14-course tasting menu inspired in part by his international travels.

As of 2014, McGarry was writing an autobiography. McGarry cites Daniel Humm, René Redzepi and Thomas Keller as cooking inspirations.

In 2015, McGarry was named one of Time magazine's thirty most influential teens. In 2016, McGarry presented a dish for a pressure test in the eighth season of Masterchef Australia.

In early 2018 McGarry opened his first permanent restaurant, Gem on the Lower East Side. Gem serves a $200, 12-15 course menu to a dining room of 12 guests over a period of 2 hours, In June 2019, Gem closed for 3 months so McGarry could travel and get more inspirations. He traveled to Los Angeles, Barcelona, London, Paris and Copenhagen.

In 2018, a documentary film about McGarry, entitled Chef Flynn, premiered at SXSW.

In 2021, he took part as a guest in an episode of the tenth season on MasterChef Italia.
