= Junior MasterChef =

- Genre: Cookery
- Created by: Franc Roddam; Karen Ross; John Silver
- Presented by: Loyd Grossman; John Torode; Donal Skehan; Nadia Sawalha
- Narrated by: India Fisher; Sharon Horgan
- Country of origin: United Kingdom
- Original language: English
- No. of series: 5 (original); 3 (revival)
- No. of episodes: 65 (original); 38 (revival)

Production
- Running time: 25–30 minutes
- Production companies: Shine TV and Ziji Productions

Original release
- Network: BBC One
- Release: 14 August 1994 – 1 August 1999
- Network: CBBC
- Release: 10 May 2010 – 21 November 2014

Related
- MasterChef UK

Junior MasterChef is a British TV cookery competition, broadcast by the BBC, in which nine to twelve-year-olds compete to be crowned "Junior MasterChef". It is a spin-off from the main British series of MasterChef.

Junior MasterChef first ran from 1994 to 1999, presented by Loyd Grossman. After a long hiatus, it was revived in 2010 in a revamped format, presented by writer and actress Nadia Sawalha, who won the 2007 series of Celebrity MasterChef, and professional chef John Torode, who also presents MasterChef. The revival series was commissioned by CBBC controller Anne Gilchrist and produced by Shine Television and was broadcast on CBBC and BBC One. A further series was commissioned in 2012 for broadcast on CBBC and again in 2014.

== Original series ==
Based on the MasterChef format, and using the same set, the original Junior MasterChef was for cooks up to the age of 16. It ran from 1994 to 1999 and was presented by Loyd Grossman.

== Revival series ==
Junior MasterChef was briefly revived in 2008 for a Children in Need special after the success of the 2006 series. It was won by Billy.

The first new series, targeting children aged 9 to 12, premiered on 10 May 2010 on CBBC. India Fisher continued to provide the voiceover, and the judging panel consisted of John Torode and Nadia Sawalha.

Georgia, who had turned 13 by the time the finals occurred, was the 2010 winner. From the 2012 series, Sawalha was replaced by Irish cook Donal Skehan.

== Age limit rules ==
The online application form for the CBBC series filmed in 2012 clearly shows that applicants had to be between 8 and 13 years old on 6 August of that year. Filming of the early heats would start on that same date.

== Winners ==
Year	Winner
1994	Kyle Cunliffe
1995	Lawrence Julian Roberts
1996	Lucy Wright
1997	Serena Martin
1998	Adam Cowley
1999	Tim Walmsley
2010	Georgia Bradford
2012	Tom Barlow-Kay
2014	Phoebe Riley

== Transmissions ==
Series	Start date	End date	Episodes
Original series
1	14 August 1994	13 November 1994	13
2	16 July 1995	22 October 1995	13
3	4 August 1996	27 October 1996	13
4	11 March 1998	31 May 1998	13
5	18 April 1999	1 August 1999	13
Revived series
1	10 May 2010	28 May 2010	13
2	5 November 2012	23 November 2012	15
3	10 November 2014	21 November 2014	10

== International versions ==
Legend: Still in production No longer airing

Country	Name	Host(s)	Judges	Network	Air dates
Albania	MasterChef Junior Albania	Redjan Mulla (narrator)	Sokol Prenga; Xheraldina Vula; Julian Zguro	RTSH	27 March 2018 – 12 June 2018 (season 1)
Australia	Junior MasterChef Australia	George Calombaris; Gary Mehigan (Season 1-2); Andy Allen; Melissa Leong; Jock Zonfrillo	Gary Mehigan; George Calombaris; Matt Preston (Season 1); Anna Gare; Matt Moran (Season 2); Andy Allen; Melissa Leong; Jock Zonfrillo	Network Ten	12 September 2010 – 15 November 2010 (Season 1); 25 September 2011 – 23 November 2011 (Season 2); 11 October 2020 (Season 3)
Belgium (in Dutch)	Junior MasterChef Belgium	unknown	Wout Bru; Fatima Marzouki	vtm	18 January 2012 – 2012
Brazil	MasterChef Junior	Ana Paula Padrão	Erick Jacquin; Paola Carosella; Henrique Fogaça	Band	20 October 2015 – 15 December 2015
Canada; Quebec	MasterChef Junior Québec	Martin Picard Stefano Faita		TVA	April 2025 – present (Season 1)
Chile	Junior MasterChef Chile	Diana Bolocco	Christopher Carpentier; Yann Yvin; Ennio Carota	Canal 13	21 March 2016 – present
Finland	Junior MasterChef	Tomi Björck; Meri-Tuuli Lindström		Nelonen	19 August 2012 – 7 October 2012
France	Junior MasterChef	Carole Rousseau	Frédéric Anton; Yves Camdeborde; Sebastian Demorand	TF1	22 December 2011; 5 July 2012; 27 December 2013
Greece; Cyprus	Junior MasterChef Greece	Maria Mpekatorou	Yiannis Loukakos; Lefteris Lazarou; Dimitris Skarmoutsos	Mega Channel	27 November 2011 – 5 February 2012
Greece; Cyprus	Junior MasterChef Greece	Eleni Psyhouli; Manolis Papoutsakis; Magky Tabakaki		Star Channel	13 September 2018 - 24 December 2018
Hungary	MasterChef Junior Hungary	—N/a	István Pesti; Zsófia Mautner; Bence Szendrei	Viasat 3	13 October 2018 – 15 December 2018
India	Junior Masterchef Swaad Ke Ustaad	—N/a	Kunal Kapoor; Vikas Khanna; Surjan Singh Jolly	Star Plus	17 August 2013 – 2 November 2013
Indonesia	Junior MasterChef Indonesia	—N/a	Arnold Poernomo; Degan Septoadji (Season 1) Rinrin Marinka; Bara Pattiradjawane (Season 2)	RCTI	6 April 2014 – 17 March 2015
Israel	Junior MasterChef Israel	unknown	Haim Cohen; Eyal Shani; Micahl Anski; Yonatan Rochfeld	Channel 2 (Keshet)	22 April 2012 – present
Italy	Junior MasterChef Italia	Joe Bastianich; Carlo Cracco	Bruno Barbieri; Lidia Bastianich; Alessandro Borghese	Sky Uno; Cielo	13 March 2014 – present
Jordan	Junior MasterChef Jordan	Mahmoud Al-Omari	Soumia Khalifa; Ahmed Saaed; Firas Mamdouh	Amman TV	6 May 2019 − present
Morocco	ماستر شيف جونيور (MasterChef Junior Morocco)	Mariam el Kamil	Mariam Ettahri; Moha Fdal; Khadija Bensdira	2M	9 October 2018 – present
Mexico	Junior MasterChef México	Anette Michel	Adrián Herrera Díaz; Benito Molina Dubost; Betty Vázquez	Azteca Trece (Azteca)	3 April 2016 – 3 July 2016; 5 March 2017 – present
Netherlands	Junior MasterChef	—N/a	Alain Caron; Peter Lute	Net5	28 November 2011 – 24 December 2011
Netherlands	Junior MasterChef	—N/a	Alain Caron; Ron Blaauw	SBS6	12 October 2012 – present
Philippines	Junior MasterChef Pinoy Edition	Judy Ann Santos-Agoncillo	Fern Aracama; Rolando Laudico; JP Anglo	ABS-CBN	27 August 2011 – 18 February 2012
Poland	Masterchef Junior	Michael Moran	Michael Moran; Mateusz Gessler; Anna Starmach	TVN	21 February 2016 – 24 April 2016 (Season 1); 19 February 2017 – 23 April 2017 (Season 2)
Portugal	Masterchef Júnior	Teresa Fernandes (narrator)	Manuel Luís Goucha; Rui Paula; Miguel Rocha Vieira	TVI	22 May 2016 – 31 July 2016 (Season 1); 2017 (Season 2)
Russia	MasterChef Deti	Alexandr Belkovich; Andrey Shmakov; Giuseppe D'Angelo		STS	7 November 2015 – 25 December 2016
Spain	MasterChef Junior	Eva González	Pepe Rodríguez; Jordi Cruz; Samantha Vallejo-Nágera	La 1	23 December 2013 – 6 January 2014 (Season 1); 30 December 2014 – 3 February 2015 (Season 2); 1 December 2015 – 5 January 2016 (Season 3); 20 December 2016 – 17 January 2017 (Season 4); 20 December 2017 – TBA 2018 (Season 5)
Sweden	Sveriges yngsta mästerkock	Tina Nordström; Leif Mannerström; Markus Aujalay		TV4	9 April 2014 – present
Taiwan	Kid's Kitchen	William Hsieh; Big Stomach; LIZ; SOAC		CTS	September 2015 – present
Thailand	Junior MasterChef Thailand	Patiparn Pataweekarn; Ban Boribun; Chatchaya Ruktakanit		Channel 3	3 February 2013 – 2 June 2013
Thailand	MasterChef Junior Thailand	Piyathida Mittiraroch	M.L. Pasan Sawasdiwat; M.L. Kwantip Devakula; Pongtawat Chalermkittichai	Channel 7	19 August 2018
Turkey	MasterChef Junior Turkey	Danilo Zanna; Somer Sivrioğlu; Mehmet Yalçınkaya		Exxen	2021
Ukraine	MasterChef Dity (Kids)	Hector Jimenez-Bravo (1-2); Tatiana Litvinova (1-2); Mykola Tischenko (1); Sergey Kalinin (2); Dmitriy Gorovenko (2)		STB	3 February 2016 – 25 May 2016 (Season 1); 31 January 2017 – 30 May 2017 (Season 2); January 2018 (Season 3)
Ukraine	MasterChef Pidlitky (Teens)	Hector Jimenez-Bravo (1-2); Tatiana Litvinova (1-2); Mykola Tischenko (1); Sergey Kalinin (2); Dmitriy Gorovenko (2)		STB	3 February 2016 – 25 May 2016 (Season 1); 31 January 2017 – 30 May 2017 (Season 2); January 2018 (Season 3)
United States	MasterChef Junior	Gordon Ramsay	Joe Bastianich (Seasons 1-3 & 6); Graham Elliot (Seasons 1-4); Christina Tosi (Season 4-7); Aaron Sanchez (Season 7); Daphne Oz (Seasons 8-9); Tilly Ramsay (Season 9)	Fox	27 September 2013 – present
Vietnam	Junior MasterChef Vietnam	—N/a	Jack Lee; Phan Tôn Tịnh Hải; Alain Nguyễn	VTV3	2 October 2016 – present

In the Taiwanese version, the series is based on the same concept as Junior Masterchef, but there are no mystery box challenges, and there are no eliminations (but there had been cases where a contestant has quit the competition for health reasons). After the first individual challenge, there are a series of team challenges, where team captains cannot enter the pantry, the person who earns the most points (doubled as a winning team captain in team challenges) wins. The eventual winner will receive home appliances instead.

== See also ==
- MasterChef
