= Junior MasterChef Australia =

Australian cooking TV series

- Genre: Cooking show
- Created by: Franc Roddam
- Written by: George Dodd
- Directed by: Jo Siddiqui
- Judges: Gary Mehigan; Anna Gare; Matt Moran; George Calombaris; Matt Preston; Andy Allen; Melissa Leong; Jock Zonfrillo; Poh Ling Yeow
- Narrated by: Nicholas McKay
- Theme music composer: Robbie Williams and Guy Chambers (2010–11)
- Opening theme: Kids (2010–11)
- Country of origin: Australia
- Original language: English
- No. of seasons: 3
- No. of episodes: 51

Production
- Production locations: Sydney (2010–11); Melbourne (2020–present)
- Running time: 60 minutes (including commercials)
- Production company: Shine Australia

Original release
- Network: Network Ten
- Release: 12 September 2010 – 23 November 2011
- Release: 11 October – 9 November 2020
- Release: 2027

Related
- MasterChef Australia; MasterChef Australia All-Stars

Junior MasterChef Australia (known colloquially as MasterChef Kids) is an Australian competitive cooking show. It is a spin-off of MasterChef Australia, itself an adaptation of the British show MasterChef, and featured contestants aged 8 to 12. The first season of the show began production in July 2010 and included 50 contestants. Over 5,000 children from around the nation auditioned for the series.

In contrast to prior series, Junior MasterChef Australia was produced by Shine Australia. The promo was seen during the final episode of the second season of MasterChef Australia. The series premiered on Sunday, 12 September 2010.

On 27 April 2020, it was announced that a third season of Junior MasterChef Australia had been commissioned, nine years after the second series aired.

In October 2026, one day before their upfronts, it was announced the series would return in 2027 with new host and judge Poh Ling Yeow, along with special guest, Meghan Markle.

== Changes ==
In the Junior series, contestants are not eliminated every week, though four are eliminated at a time once the finalists are decided. Every eliminated contestant receives a range of prizes.

From series 3, casting was extended to children aged between 9–14 years old, as opposed to 8–12 years old.

== Hosts and judges ==
Timeline of hosts, judges and other personnel
Starring	Seasons		
Starring	1	2	3
Current
Jock Zonfrillo			Host & Judge
Melissa Leong			Host & Judge
Andy Allen			Host & Judge
Former
Gary Mehigan	Host & Judge	Host & Judge	
George Calombaris	Host & Judge	Host & Judge	
Matt Preston	Host & Judge		
Anna Gare	Judge	Judge	
Matt Moran		Judge	

== Winners ==
Season	Numbers of Contestants	Name	Age	State	Occupation	Date Won
1	12	Isabella Bliss	12	New South Wales	School Student	15 November 2010
2	20	Greta Yaxley	11	Western Australia	School Student	23 November 2011
3	14	Georgia Eris	11	Victoria	School Student	9 November 2020

== Series synopses ==
=== Season 1 (2010) ===
Production of a junior version of the show was initially suggested in October 2009. The first series of the show, featuring 8- to 12-year-old contestants, was filmed after the second series of MasterChef Australia and began airing 12 September 2010 on Ten. In contrast to prior series of the main show, Junior MasterChef Australia was produced by Shine Australia. Isabella Bliss won the contest to become Australia's first Junior MasterChef.

=== Season 2 (2011) ===
Junior MasterChef was officially renewed on 15 November 2010. Filming started on 28 July 2011, with the season premiering in October 2011.

Matt Moran replaced Matt Preston as a judge and Callum Hann was a guest in the series.

11-year-old Greta Yaxley from Western Australia won the Junior MasterChef title for 2011.

=== Season 3 (2020) ===
A revamped third series of Junior MasterChef Australia was announced on 27 April 2020, nine years after the second series last aired. Applications for casting were opened on 25 April 2020 for children across Australia aged from 9–14.

Andy Allen, Melissa Leong and Jock Zonfrillo returned from the main series to undertake the role of judges. As of late-July 2020, the program began filming at the Melbourne Showgrounds in Flemington.

The series premiered on 11 October 2020.

11-year old Georgia Eris from Victoria won the title with 12-year old Filo from Victoria and 11-year old Carter from New South Wales as the runners up.

== Reception ==
=== Ratings ===
Series	Premiere date	Finale date	Episodes	Premiere ratings	Rank	Finale ratings (Grand final)	Rank	Finale ratings (Winner announced)	Rank	Series Average
1	12 September 2010	15 November 2010	17	2.202	#1	1.532	#2	1.853	#1	1.313
2	25 September 2011	23 November 2011	21	1.129	#5	0.934	#10	0.911	#12	0.844
3	11 October 2020	9 November 2020	13	0.524	#8	0.652	#12	0.881	#5	0.539

== International syndications ==
The network in bold also broadcasts their own version of Junior MasterChef.

Country	Network	Dubbed or Subtitled?
Afghanistan	STAR World	Subtitled in Dari
Arab League	STAR World	Subtitled in Arabic
Bangladesh	STAR World	Subtitled in English
Belgium	Vitaya	Subtitled in Dutch
Bhutan	STAR World India	Subtitled in English
Brazil	TLC	Dubbed in Portuguese
Burma	STAR World	Subtitled
Cyprus	Nova (Forthnet)	Subtitled
Mexico; Colombia; Venezuela; Argentina; Peru; Ecuador; Bolivia; Chile; Uruguay; Paraguay; Panama; Costa Rica; El Salvador; Guatemala; Honduras; Nicaragua; Dominican Republic	TLC	Dubbed in Spanish
Argentina	Discovery Home & Health	Dubbed in Spanish
Finland	Liv	Subtitled
Greece	Cosmote TV	Subtitled
Hong Kong	TVB Pearl	Subtitled (English and Selectable Cantonese) and Subtitled (Cantonese)
Hong Kong	STAR World	Subtitled in Cantonese
India	STAR World India	Dubbed in Hindi
Indonesia	B Channel	Subtitled
Ireland	Watch	
Italy	Sky Uno and Cielo	Dubbed
Macau	STAR World	Subtitled in Cantonese
Malaysia	STAR World	Subtitled
Nepal	STAR World India	Subtitled in English
New Zealand	Prime and TVNZ	
Pakistan	STAR World	Subtitled
Philippines	STAR World	
Poland	TV4	Polish lector
Portugal	SIC K and SIC Mulher	Subtitled in Portuguese
Slovenia	Planet TV	Subtitled
South Africa	M-Net	
Sri Lanka	STAR World India	Subtitled in English
Singapore	STAR World	Subtitled in English
Singapore	Okto	
Singapore	MediaCorp Channel 5	
South Korea	Food TV	Subtitled
Sweden	TV8 and TV3 (Sweden)	Subtitled
Taiwan	STAR World	Subtitled
Thailand	STAR World	Subtitled
The Netherlands	**NET 5**	Subtitled in Dutch
The Netherlands	24Kitchen	Subtitled in Dutch
United Arab Emirates	StarWorld HD	Subtitled in Arabic
United Arab Emirates	Fox	Subtitled In Arabic
Vietnam	STAR World	Subtitled
Vietnam	VTV6	Subtitled (Vietnamese)
Kuwait	STAR World HD	Subtitled in Arabic
Kuwait	Fox	Subtitled In Arabic
Brunei; Cambodia; Hong Kong; Indonesia; Macau; Malaysia; Maldives; Myanmar; Palau; Philippines; Singapore; Taiwan; Thailand; PNG	Lifetime Asia	Subtitled
