= Sarah Hopkins =

Sarah Hopkins may refer to:

- Sarah Hopkins Bradford (1818–1912), American writer and historian
- Sarah Winnemucca Hopkins (1844–1891), Native American author, activist and educator
- Sarah Hopkins (writer), Australian criminal lawyer and novelist
