= Junior MasterChef Australia series 1 =

Junior MasterChef Australia
- Series 1
- Judges: Matt Preston; George Calombaris; Gary Mehigan; Anna Gare
- No. of contestants: 12
- Winner: Isabella Bliss
- Runner-up: Jack Lark
- No. of episodes: 17

Release
- Original network: Network 10
- Original release: 12 September – 15 November 2010

Series chronology
- Next → Series 2

The first series of Junior MasterChef Australia, the second spin-off of the Australian reality television series MasterChef Australia, began on 12 September 2010 and aired on Network Ten. Matt Preston, George Calombaris and Gary Mehigan returned alongside new judge, Anna Gare.

The series was won by then 12-year-old Isabella Bliss from New South Wales.

== Changes ==
In contrast to prior series, Junior MasterChef Australia is produced by Shine Australia. The series premiered on Sunday, 12 September 2010. It also added Anna Gare as fourth judge during individual challenges.

The series began with the Top 50 selected from the 5,500 applicants who auditioned for the show. The Top 50 featured five heats, with ten from the Top 50 who were best at the heat's team participating in each heat. Afterwards, the judges selected four to move forward to the Top 20. Furthermore, the Top 20 competed in two challenges to pick the Top 12. Contrast to other versions, contestants are not eliminated every week; rather, four are eliminated every few episodes. Every eliminated contestant received a range of prizes, including those in the Top 50.

== Contestants ==
The top 12 contestants were chosen throughout the first week of challenges amongst the Top 50 and the Top 20. The full group of 12 were all revealed on Sunday, 26 September 2010:

Contestant	Age	State	Status
Isabella Bliss^{1}	12	QLD	Winner 15 November
Jack Lark	12–13^{2}	TAS	Runner-up 15 November
Siena Johnston	9	VIC	Eliminated 14 November
Sofia Bliss^{1}	12	QLD	Eliminated 14 November
Cassidy Higgins	12	VIC	Eliminated 8 November
Lucy Bonanno	11	VIC	Eliminated 8 November
Nick Lieurance	10	NSW	Eliminated 8 November
Pierre Khoury	12	NSW	Eliminated 8 November
Alex Gearing	11	NSW	Eliminated 25 October
Anthony Georgiou	10	NSW	Eliminated 25 October
Emily Falloon	11	SA	Eliminated 25 October
Sam Bradley	11	QLD	Eliminated 25 October

Notes:

^1 – Isabella and Sofia Bliss are fraternal twins.
^2 – Jack Lark was 12 years old during his audition for the show, the maximum age for the cooks who auditioned. Afterwards, he turned 13 during their first week in the MasterChef Kitchen.

=== Winner ===
Isabella Bliss entered Junior MasterChef Australia with her fraternal twin sister, Sofia. The twins hoped to open a restaurant named Is-Sofia.

In 2011, the Bliss twins published a cook book named A little bit of this, a little bit of that. They also worked with "Cupcake for A Cure", a child cancer charity.

In November 2013, Isabella Bliss was named as one of YWCA Queensland's "125 Leading Women". As of 2016, Isabella was studying at the University of Queensland and Sofia was undertaking a gap year.

== Special guests ==
- Callum Hann – Top 20 Cooking Challenge
- Mark Jensen – MasterClass 1
- Poh Ling Yeow – MasterClass 1
- Donna Hay – Pressure Test 2 and Elimination Challenge 3
- John Lanzafáme – Elimination Challenge 1
- Justin North – Team Challenge 2
- Matt Moran – Team Challenge 2, MasterClass Réunion, and Elimination Challenge 3
- Jude Bolton – Team Challenge 3
- Adam Goodes – Team Challenge 3
- Luke Mangan – Team Challenge 3
- Stephanie Alexander – MasterClass 3 and MasterClass Réunion
- Peter Gilmore – Mystery Box 3
- Peter Kuruvita – Elimination Challenge 2
- Kylie Kwong – MasterClass Réunion
- Guillaume Brahimi – MasterClass Réunion
- Christine Manfield – MasterClass Réunion and Elimination Challenge 3
- Giovanni Pilu – MasterClass Réunion
- Shannon Bennett – Finale Night
- Adriano Zumbo – Finale Night

== Episodes ==
Ep#	Original airdate	Episode title / event	Total viewers	Nightly ranking	Weekly ranking
1	12 September 2010	Series Premiere: Top 50 Heat 1 & 2 – 20 of the top 50 participated in two heats focusing on international dishes and desserts. Four will be selected from each heats, wherein Gary, George and Anna decide who will form the first 8 of the Top 20. In Heat 1, the first 10 contestants cooked dishes representing a foreign country's cuisine. Eventually, Tayla, Nick, Isabella B. and Sofia wowed the judges with their French, Greek and Italian representations. In Heat 2, the 10 best pastry chefs among the Top 50 prepared a dessert of their choice for the judges. Ashley, Clarence, Lucy and Sam triumphed and advanced to the Top 20.	2,202,000	1st	1st
2	19 September 2010	Top 50 Heat 3, 4 & 5 – The remaining 30 of the top 50 competed in the last three heats. In Heat 3, the 10 greatest seafood chefs served their dishes to the three judges and Matt. Sophie J., Sophie M., Ainsleigh and Alex impressed the most, gaining their spots in the Top 20. In Heat 4, the 10 youngest cooks of the Top 50 made their signature dishes, in which Nick L., Te Ani, Siena and Anthony won. In the last heat, the 10 remaining chefs put up meat dishes. In the end, Emily, Jack, Cassidy and Pierre completed the Top 20. For the 30 eliminated contestants, the judges presented them a plaque and an array of cooking equipment certifying their qualification in the Top 50.	1,748,000	1st	7th
3	26 September 2010	Top 20 Cooking Challenge – To narrow the Top 20 into twelve, the contestants took part in two rounds where the six best contestants of each challenge will be chosen by the judges. In Round 1, the Top 20 were surprised with an Invention Test composing of two core ingredients: chicken and vegetables which will be freshly hand-picked by the cooks themselves. The Invention Test saw Nick L., Isabella B., Sofia, Jack, Alex and Sam rising on the occasion. In Round 2, the remaining 14 contestants go under a Pressure Test where they will recreate MasterChef Australia Series 2 runner-up Callum Hann's Chocolate Croissant Pudding with Berries, Cream and Chocolate Sauce. The dish propelled Lucy, Anthony, Emily, Siena, Pierre and Cassidy to the Top 12. As for the 8 eliminated contestants, they received the same prizes that the Top 50 had.	1,507,000	1st	8th
4	17 October 2010	Invention Test 1 – Pie theme. The contestants were informed that they will compete for points in every challenge, in which chefs with the highest points will get through to the next stage; and that elimination will take place during each stage of the competition. Then, the cooks competed in their first Mystery Box Challenge in the MasterChef kitchen, with Isabella's Lemon Meringue Cupcake winning her the challenge and picking lamb as key ingredient in the Invention Test. Ultimately, Pierre's Lamb Wellington with Spinach and Mushroom Duxelles granted him first place and power in the next Team Challenge.	1,390,000	2nd	4th
5	18 October 2010	Team Challenge 1 and Pressure Test 1 – In their first Team Challenge, the cooks run a high school tuck shop and cook for 100 students of Hunters Hill High School. Pierre, led the red team: Isabella, Jack, Alex, Nick, and Cassidy. While Anthony was picked by Pierre to lead the Blue Team: Sofia, Lucy, Sam, Siena, and Emily. The teams, aided by Gary and Anna respectively, had 3 hours to prepare 1 cold dish, 1 hot dish, and 1 sweet dish for each student. The Blue Team's menu, which composed of Honey Soy Chicken Wings with Noodle Salad, Nori Rolls with Hoisin Chicken, Tuna and Avocado, and Custard Tarts with Berries, proved to be more appealing than the Red Team's Cheese and Bacon Quiches, Spinach and Cheese Triangles, Meatball Rolls with Tzatziki, and Chocolate Brownies with Raspberry Coulis and Chocolate Cream. The Blue team earned six points each, while the Red Team had to face the Pressure Test. In the kitchen, the Red Team were faced with a Poached Pear with Cranberry Syrup, Vanilla Mascarpone and Tuile in a one-hour limit. The pear and tuile proved to be a nightmare for some, nevertheless Nick arose and had the best interpretation, earning himself six points.	1,125,000	9th	19th
6	22 October 2010	MasterClass 1 – Contestants from the Top 50 return for a MasterClass with Gary, Red Lantern head chef Mark Jensen, and MasterChef Australia Series 1 runner-up Poh Ling Yeow. Gary served up a Chicken Schnitzel with Grilled Eggplant, Heirloom Tomato Salad and Mozzarella, Mark did a traditional Vietnamese Pho, while Poh made a Vanilla Yoghurt Pannacotta with Raspberry Jelly and Pistachio Tuile.	830,000	8th	52nd
7	24 October 2010	Choose A Box 1 and Pressure Test 2 – Asian theme. The contestants were shocked by a Choose A Box Challenge where the cooks played a Secret Santa-like game to pick the person who will participate in the Choose A Box Challenge. Lucy was selected and unknowingly picked duck as the core ingredient of the challenge. Nick won through his Crispy Skin Duck with Chilli, Bok Choy and Oyster Sauce, while Sam was awarded with an additional point for being most improved with his Duck with Vietnamese Salad. In the Pressure Test, the cooks attempted to recreate Donna Hay's Four Tier Chocolate Cake, in which they can freely choose the toppings for their cake. Slicing the cake into four equal parts was a true pressure point for everyone, nonetheless Sofia amazed Donna and the judges with her Mixed Berry Salsa topping. Meanwhile, Alex' Chocolate Dipped Strawberry with Vanilla Cream and Chocolate Swirl and Emily's Marinated Berries with Shaved White Chocolate granted both additional points for being the two most improved.	1,452,000	1st	2nd
8	25 October 2010	Taste Test and Elimination Challenge 1 – The competitors went on a Taste Test where they had to guess the 20 ingredients of Hugo's Management executive chef John Lanzafáme's 8.5 meter Black Olive and Ham Parmesan Pizza with Semolina Dough in a time duration of 5 minutes. Sofia correctly guessed 18, adding six points to her name in the scoreboard. Sofia, Isabella, Nick and Pierre, the four cooks on top of the scoreboard that time, were sent through to the Top 8 instantly in the end of the challenge. The other 8 were given another chance in the Hot and Cold Challenge where they will create a hot dish and a cold dish, each dish made in the scope of sixty minutes. The challenge saw Lucy, Jack, Siena and Cassidy advancing to the Top 8. On the other hand, Sam, Emily, Anthony and Alex were eliminated and were given prizes and a trophy attesting their inclusion in the Top 12.	1,262,000	4th	9th
9	29 October 2010	MasterClass 2 – Students from Bangalow Public School in New South Wales had a MasterClass with George, Anna, and Gary. George made a Fillet of Beef with Herb and Garlic Butter and Tomato Concasse, Anna did an Open Lasagne with Smoked Trout and Creamed Leeks, while Gary served up a Clafoutis of Cherries with Mascarpone and Cherry Compote.	657,000	11th	82nd
10	31 October 2010	Basic Skills Test and Team Challenge 2 – The scoreboard was reset as the Top 8 faced a Basic Skills Test. The challenge had three stages, eliminating contestants in every stage. Pierre and Lucy were too slow in whipping cream in the first stage, followed by Nick, Cassidy, and Isabella failing to shill peas measuring between 290–310 grams in the next stage. Finally, Sofia beat Jack and Siena in making the perfect scrambled eggs in the last stage. Before the next challenge is revealed, Matt returns as judge, subsequently telling the cooks of their first Tag Team Challenge. The Top 8 were divided into two teams, with the exception of Pierre who was temporarily excused for not feeling well. The Blue Team, Sofia, Jack, Cassidy and Nick, aided by ARIA executive chef Matt Moran, and the Red Team Isabella, Lucy and Siena, assisted by Bécasse executive chef Justin North, recreate a Prawn Tortellini with Sautéed Marron and Pumpkin Purée. Each team member will have 15 minutes to cook the dish, and will tag their next member to continue cooking after they finish their turn. Each team members can tag Matt and Justin for only 90 seconds to help them. Blind tasting both dishes, the judges picked the Red Team as winners, forcing the Blue Team to a Pressure Test.	1,358,000	2nd	10th
11	1 November 2010	Pressure Test 3 and Team Challenge 3 – The Blue Team, with the exception of Nick (who was excused for not feeling well), saw themselves making their interpretation of Florentine Tarts with Frangipane. Starting and finishing strong, Cassidy won the challenge. In the Team Challenge, all contestants (except Nick and Pierre) were divided into three teams to cook for 40 members of the Sydney Swans team and coaches in 2 hours, including football captains Jude Bolton and Adam Goodes in The Basil Sellers Centre. The three teams were assigned to cook different dishes: Madras Chicken Curry with Sweet Potato and Rice for the Red Team (Cassidy and Sofia), Stir-fried Snapper with Lemon Grass, Asian Greens, and Noodles for the Blue Team (Siena and Jack), and Moroccan Lamb with Couscous for the Yellow Team (Isabella and Lucy). All teams were helped by The Palace head chef Luke Mangan. Despite having late service, the Blue Team scored 14 out of 40 while the Yellow Team had 11, both placing behind the Red Team who won the challenge with a score of 15.	1,205,000	6th	17th
12	5 November 2010	MasterClass 3 – Students from Bondi Public School in Sydney had a MasterClass with Anna, George, and Kitchen Garden Program founder Stephanie Alexander. Stephanie did Skewered Meatballs on Rosemary Flat Bread with Carrot Salad and Spinach Yoghurt, Anna made a Red Curry of Duck with Lychees and Cucumber Salsa, while George served up Three Flavours of Granita (Orange Blossom, Chinotto/Kaffir Leaf, and Raspberry).	655,000	10th	76th
13	7 November 2010	Invention Test 2 – French theme. The contestants (except Nick) were told that the two cooks on the top of the scoreboard in each challenge will go through to the Top 4. In a Mystery Box Challenge with a twist, the chefs will pick which fruits they will like to use in their dishes. With each dish having a minimum of three fruits and Quay executive chef Peter Gilmore in the tasting table, Sofia outwins everyone with her Pettolé filled with Créme Patisserie and Blueberries and Honey. The dish not only won her the challenge, but also got herself to the Top 4 and gaining the advantage to pick pheasant as the core ingredient in the Invention Test. Isabella's Roasted Pheasant Breast with Game Sauce, Beetroot and Tomato Puree, Potato and Truffle Gratin and Beans was favorite to win, yet Siena's Pheasant à l'Orange with Pistachio and Cranberry Filling prevailed, adding six points to her score, enough to move her through to the Top 4.	1,440,000	2nd	10th
14	8 November 2010	Elimination Challenge 2 – The chefs were sent to Peter Kuruvita's one-hatted Flying Fish restaurant to perform lunch service for 40 guests, including the mothers of the cooks. Peter assigned each chef a different recipe: Pierre had Sautéed Ocean Trout with Asparagus, Sauce Créme, and Salmon Caviar; Isabella got Tea Crusted Flathead in a Seafood Consommé with Daikon and Vongole; Cassidy received Murray Cod with Corn Purée, Beluga Lentils and Tobacco Rings; Jack had Coral Trout with Chicken Consommé, Shiitake Mushrooms, and Zucchini Flowers; Lucy got Sri Lankan Fish Curry; and Nick received Blue Eye Cod with Crispy Chicken Wings and Scallop Mousse. The chefs not only will collect their produce fresh from the market, but also will have only two hours for preparation. During service, Siena and Sofia return to serve as waitresses. In the end, the judges were unanimous of sending Jack and Isabella to the Top 4. Pierre, Lucy, Cassidy and Nick were eliminated and were given prizes and a trophy remembering their inclusion in the Top 8.	1,236,000	5th	12th
15	12 November 2010	MasterClass Réunion – Matt Moran, Billy Kwong executive chef Kylie Kwong, Guillaume at Bennelong's head chef Guillaume Brahimi, Universal chef Christine Manfield, and Pilu's chef Giovanni Pilu, with their children and nephews Harry, Chai, Constance, Hugh, and Julian, had a MasterClass with George regarding his Scallop and Smoked Salmon Osso Bucco with Rhubarb Tart and Blood Orange Vinaigrette. Later on, the Top 12 reunited for their first MasterClass at the MasterChef Kitchen where George and Anna discussed their favorite dishes from the competition, such as Sofia's Prawn Ravioli with Rocket and Tomato Salsa, Siena's Lemon and Lime Curd Tart with Macaroon Base and Raspberry Sauce, and Pierre's Lamb Wellington with Spinach and Mushroom Duxelles. Stephanie Alexander did her Butterflied Leg of Lamb with Herb Crust and Roasted Vegetables, while George showed how to make her Chocolate and Hazelnut Self Saucing Puddings with Créme Chantilly and Candied Orange Zest.	680,000	12th	73rd
16	14 November 2010	Elimination Challenge 3 – The contestants battle in a Mystery Box challenge having three core ingredients: beetroot, rocket leaves, and snail. The strange combination of flavours showed different results to the judges, which consisted of Matt Preston, Matt Moran, Donna Hay and Christine Manfield. With influence of molecular gastronomy, Jack's Snail Porridge with Rocket Butter and Beetroot Tuile beat Sofia's Snail and Rocket Fritelle Stack with Battered Snails and Beetroot Purée, Isabella's Nonna's Spaghetti and Snail Sugo with Beetroot, Rocket, and Fennel Salad, and Siena's Snail and Chorizo Risotto with Mushroom Foam and Beetroot Salad for the first spot in the Final 2. Having their last chance for a spot in the Final 2, the cooks play the Junior MasterChef Spinning Wheel to determine the dish they will cook in the Pressure Test. The wheel landed on George's Spring Bay Mussel Spanakopita with Chickpea Vinaigrette. Cooking mussels for their first time, the girls' interpretations had highs and lows: Sofia's vinaigrette was the best, however there weren't enough poured in the dish; Siena had vibrant tomatoes yet stuffed the mussels too much; while Isabella had the best spanakopita filling but a messed presentation. Eventually, Isabella received the last place in the Final 2, leading to the emotional elimination of Sofia and Siena. Both received a trophy and a $5,000 trust fund.	1,504,000	1st	1st
17	15 November 2010	Finale Night – Prior the challenge, the 10 eliminated contestants go in a Team Pressure Test with a twist: the contestants will be "remote-controlling" George or Gary under pressure. Gary and George will be cooking the dish without knowing what they'll cook and without any recipe. The contestants will only dictate the recipe through the headphones worn by the judges, and their team will have only 15 minutes to finish the dish. George's Team (Sofia, Pierre, Emily, Sam and Alex) was faster but less efficient, while Gary's Team (Anthony, Lucy, Siena, Nick and Cassidy) went on a slow pace and won for having a tastier dish. Afterwards, Isabella and Jack enter the kitchen to begin the competition. To determine the Junior MasterChef, Isabella and Jack will battle in two rounds: an Invention Test and a Pressure Test. Each round, the cooks will be scored from a total of 50. Prior the challenge, it was announced that Vue de Monde executive chef Shannon Bennett will join Matt, Anna, Gary and George in the judging table. For the Invention Test, Isabella and Jack can freely pick what will be the core ingredient of their dish. Jack's Tea Smoked Quail in a Citrus Sauce with Dressed Mushrooms gathered 41 out of 50 from the judges, while Isabella's Scallops with Garlic Custard, Seaweed Broth and Lemon and Blood Orange Jelly received 47 out of 50, winning her the Invention Test. In the second part of the challenge, Jack and Isabella undergo a Pressure Test where they will recreate Adriano Zumbo's Pear Perfection. The challenge saw Jack prevailing with a massive 53 points, earning the grade after collecting 11 out of 10 scores from three out of the 5 judges. Despite Jack's ginormous score of 94 out of 100, Isabella won after getting a perfect score of 50 points, putting her total into 97 out of 100. Jack received a trophy, a set of culinary equipment, and a $10,000 trust fund; Isabella, on the other hand, received a larger trophy and a $15,000 trust fund. As the two chefs embrace their families, Gary reveals that they and their families will go to Tokyo and Tokyo Disneyland courtesy of Jetstar.	1,532,000 (first hour); 1,853,000 (second hour)	1st/2nd	1st

== Elimination table ==
	Weeks 1–3	Week 4		Week 5		Weeks 4–5 Total	Week 6		Week 7		Weeks 6–7 Total	Week 8	
Invention Test Winner	None	Pierre		–		Weeks 4–5 Total	–		Siena		Weeks 6–7 Total	–	
Mystery Box Challenge Winner	None	Isabella		Nick (Choose a Box)		Weeks 4–5 Total	–		Sofia		Weeks 6–7 Total	Jack	
Pressure Test Winner	None	Nick		Sofia		Weeks 4–5 Total	Cassidy		–		Weeks 6–7 Total	Isabella	
Skills Test Winner	None	–		–		Weeks 4–5 Total	Sofia		–		Weeks 6–7 Total	–	
Taste Test Winner	None	–		Sofia		Weeks 4–5 Total	–		–		Weeks 6–7 Total	–	
Individual Challenges		IT	PT	PT	Elim		PT	–	IT	Elim		PT	
Isabella	Top 12	IN	Btm 3	Top 3	Top 4	15	Team Win	Team 3rd	Top 3	Btm 6	17	Btm 3	Winner
Jack	Top 12	Top 3	Team Lose	IN	Btm 8	10	Team Lose	Team 2nd	Top 3	Btm 6	11	ADV	RUNNER-UP
Siena	Top 12	Top 3	Team Win	IN	Btm 8	12	Team Win	Team 2nd	I.T. Winner	Top 2	21	Elim	Eliminated (Ep 16)
Sofia	Top 12	IN	Team Win	S.C. Winner	Top 4	27	Team Lose	Team 1st	ADV	Top 2	22	Elim	Eliminated (Ep 16)
Cassidy	Top 12	IN	Team Lose	IN	Btm 5	10	Team Lose	Team 1st	IN	Elim	15	Eliminated (Ep 14)	
Lucy	Top 12	IN	Team Win	IN	Btm 8	11	Team Win	Team 3rd	IN	Elim	10	Eliminated (Ep 14)	
Nick	Top 12	IN	Team Lose	IN	Top 4	16	Team Lose	DNP	DNP	Elim	5	Eliminated (Ep 14)	
Pierre	Top 12	I.T. Winner	Btm 3	Top 3	Top 4	13	DNP	DNP	IN	Elim	11	Eliminated (Ep 14)	
Alex	Top 12	IN	Btm 3	Top 5	Elim	10	Eliminated (Ep 8)						
Anthony	Top 12	IN	Team Win	IN	Elim	11	Eliminated (Ep 8)						
Emily	Top 12	IN	Team Win	Top 5	Elim	12	Eliminated (Ep 8)						
Sam	Top 12	IN	Team Win	IN	Elim	12	Eliminated (Ep 8)						
Notes	None			^{See note 1}^{See note 2}	^{See note 3}		^{See note 4}	^{See note 5}	^{See note 6}	^{See note 7}		None	^{See note 8}
Eliminated	None				Alex Anthony Emily Sam		None			Cassidy Lucy Nick Pierre		Siena Sofia	Jack; 94 points to win
Eliminated	None				Alex Anthony Emily Sam		None			Cassidy Lucy Nick Pierre		Siena Sofia	Isabella; 97 points to win

- ^1 Choose a Box Challenge was played as a Mystery Box variant. Sam was awarded one additional point for being most improved.
- ^2 Alex and Emily were awarded one additional point for being most improved.
- ^3 The Top 4 at this point (Sofia, Nick, Isabella and Pierre) were given a free pass to the Final 8.
- ^4 A Tag Team Challenge was played as a Team Challenge variant. Nick was awarded one point after being excused from the challenge as he was not feeling well.
- ^5 Nick and Pierre were awarded one point after being excused from the challenge as they were not feeling well.
- ^6 Nick was awarded one point after being excused from the challenge as he was not feeling well. Sofia had the highest score at this point and was given a free pass to the Final 4.
- ^7 Siena had the highest score at this point and was given a free pass to the Final 4.
- ^8 Isabella and Jack competed against each other in two rounds consisting of an Invention Test and a Pressure Test. Points would be earned for each test, with the winner decided based on the final tally after the two tests.

Preceded by MasterChef Australia (series 2)	MasterChef Australia spin-off 12 September 2010 – 15 November 2010	Succeeded by MasterChef Australia (series 3)
