= Junior MasterChef Australia series 2 =

Junior MasterChef Australia
- Series 2
- Judges: George Calombaris; Gary Mehigan; Anna Gare; Matt Moran
- No. of contestants: 20
- Winner: Greta Yaxley
- Runner-up: Jack Kibble
- No. of episodes: 21

Release
- Original network: Network 10
- Original release: 25 September – 23 November 2011

Series chronology
- ← Previous; Series 1 Next → Series 3

The second series of Junior MasterChef Australia, the second spin-off of the Australian reality television series MasterChef Australia, premiered on Sunday, 25 September 2011. Auditions closed on 6 May 2011; children who will be aged between eight and twelve years old during the period from 13 June to 28 October 2011 were eligible. The judging panel consists of Gary Mehigan, George Calombaris, Matt Moran and Anna Gare. Matt Preston, who had been involved in every incarnation of the MasterChef Australia series up to this point, left the series (also declining a spot as a guest judge on the American version of MasterChef), stating he wants to concentrate on his duties as a food critic. He was replaced by Matt Moran.

Some parents of prospective participants have been critical of the far-reaching contract required by the program's production company.

Then Prime Minister Julia Gillard filmed a guest appearance. The show also featured a trip to Disneyland California.

The series was won by Greta Yaxley from Claremont, Western Australia.

== Top 20 ==
Contestant	Age	State	Status
Greta Yaxley	11	WA	Winner; 23 November 2011
Jack Kibble	12	QLD	Runner-up; 23 November 2011
Harry Christophers	11	WA	Eliminated; 22 November 2011
Zac Simshauser	12	NSW	Eliminated; 22 November 2011
Alysha Bernard	12	WA	Eliminated; 21 November 2011
Indigo Porter	12	QLD	Eliminated; 21 November 2011
Chandler May	11	SA	Eliminated; 20 November 2011
Lily Simpson	10	NSW	Eliminated; 20 November 2011
Kieren Dolianitis	11	VIC	Eliminated; 13 November 2011
Madi Davis	11	NSW	Eliminated; 13 November 2011
Miraede Bhatia	10	SA	Eliminated; 13 November 2011
Steven Tsoukatos	12	SA	Eliminated; 13 November 2011
Dee Heyworth	12	NSW	Eliminated; 30 October 2011
Gracie Nieuwhof	12	TAS	Eliminated; 30 October 2011
Marcus Pannozzo	11	NSW	Eliminated; 30 October 2011
Tom Voss	11	NSW	Eliminated; 30 October 2011
Aya Richardson	11	NSW	Eliminated; 16 October 2011
Caroline Wang	11	NSW	Eliminated; 16 October 2011
Hannah Olive	10	VIC	Eliminated; 16 October 2011
Jade Finn	10	QLD	Eliminated; 16 October 2011

== Ratings and episodes ==
Ep#	Original airdate	Episode Title	Total viewers (five metro cities)	Nightly Ranking	Ref.
1	Sunday, 25 September 2011	Top 50 - Round 1	1,129,000	5	
2	Monday, 26 September 2011	Top 50 - Round 2	955,000	8	
3	Sunday, 2 October 2011	Top 50 - Round 3	1,055,000	11	
4	Monday, 3 October 2011	Top 20 Arrive at The MC Kitchen	770,000	11	
5	Sunday, 9 October 2011	Offsite Challenge - Summit Restaurant	899,000	11	
6	Monday, 10 October 2011	Taste Test & Invention Test - Chocolate	843,000	13	
7	Sunday, 16 October 2011	Pressure Test & Perfect Roast	872,000	8	
8	Monday, 17 October 2011	Mystery Box & Family Desserts	741,000	13	
9	Sunday, 23 October 2011	Offsite Challenge - Tobruk Sheep Station	—N/a	—N/a	—N/a
10	Monday, 24 October 2011	Prawn Invention Test & 5 Star Breakfast Challenge	—N/a	—N/a	—N/a
11	Sunday, 30 October 2011	The Perfect Curry & Cheesecake Pressure Test	—N/a	—N/a	—N/a
12	Monday, 31 October 2011	Top 12 Travel to The USA	—N/a	—N/a	—N/a
13	Sunday, 6 November 2011	Perfect American Hamburgers & Prawn Quesadillas	—N/a	—N/a	—N/a
14	Monday, 7 November 2011	Disneyland Challenge	—N/a	—N/a	—N/a
15	Sunday, 13 November 2011	Mad Hatters Tea Party & A Pressure Test	856,000	7	
16	Monday, 14 November 2011	Double Mystery Box	602,000	18	
17	Tuesday, 15 November 2011	Food Deception & Christmas Dinner	708,000	15	
18	Sunday, 20 November 2011	Perfect Pavlova	845,000	8	
19	Monday, 21 November 2011	Conveyor Belt Mystery Challenge	675,000	14	
20	Tuesday, 22 November 2011	Semi Final	723,000	15	
21	Wednesday, 23 November 2011	Grand Final	934,000	10	
21	Wednesday, 23 November 2011	Winner Announced	911,000	12	

== Elimination Table ==
	Weeks 1-2	Week 3	Week 4			Weeks 3-4 Total	Week 5	Week 6			Weeks 5-6 Total	Week 7	Week 8			Weeks 7-8 Total	Week 9	Week 10			Weeks 9-10 Total	Finale		
Invention Test Winner	None	Madi	Chandler			Weeks 3-4 Total	Indigo	Alysha			Weeks 5-6 Total	Greta	Greta; Kieren		Jack	Weeks 7-8 Total	-	Indigo	Greta	Harry	Weeks 9-10 Total	Greta		
Mystery Box Challenge Winner	None	Lily	-			Weeks 3-4 Total	Alysha	Zac			Weeks 5-6 Total	-	-			Weeks 7-8 Total	Lily	-			Weeks 9-10 Total	Greta		
Pressure Test Winner	None	-	-			Weeks 3-4 Total	-	-			Weeks 5-6 Total	-	Greta			Weeks 7-8 Total	-	-			Weeks 9-10 Total	-		
Skills Test Winner	None	-	-			Weeks 3-4 Total	-	-			Weeks 5-6 Total	Greta; Harry; Jack; Steven	-			Weeks 7-8 Total	-	-			Weeks 9-10 Total	-		
Taste Test Winner	None	-	Greta; Harry; Indigo; Lily; Madi; Miraede			Weeks 3-4 Total	-	-			Weeks 5-6 Total	-	-			Weeks 7-8 Total	-	-			Weeks 9-10 Total	-		
Individual Challenges		IT	-	IT	Elim		IT	-	IT	Elim		IT	PT	IT	Elim		-	IT		Elim		IT	Elim	
Greta	Top 20	IN	Team 2nd	Top 3	Top 12	14	IN	Team 4th	Top 3	Top 8	25	I.T. Winner	Team Lose	I.T. Winner	Top 6	19	Team Lose	I.T. Winner		Top 4	35	I.T. Winner	ADV	WINNER
Jack	Top 20	Top 3	Team 1st	IN	Top 12	16	IN	Team 4th	IN	Btm 8	21	Top 3	Team Win	IN	Top 6	17	Team Win	IN		Top 4	26	IN	Win	RUNNER-UP
Harry	Top 20	IN	Team 4th	IN	Top 12	10	IN	Team 3rd	IN	Btm 6	17	IN	Team Lose	Top 6	Btm 6	8	Team Win	IN		Btm 4	23	Btm 3	Elim	Eliminated (ep 20)
Zac	Top 20	IN	Team 2nd	IN	Btm 6	8	Top 4	Team 1st	Top 3	Top 8	27	IN	Team Win	Top 6	Top 6	10	Team Win	Top 3		Top 4	29	Top 2	Elim	Eliminated (ep 20)
Alysha	Top 20	IN	Team 4th	IN	Btm 8	5	IN	Team 2nd	I.T. Winner	Top 8	23	IN	Team Win	Top 6	Top 6	10	Team Lose	IN		Btm 4	17	Elim	Eliminated (ep 19)	
Indigo	Top 20	Top 3	Team 2nd	IN	Top 12	14	I.T. Winner	Team 4th	IN	Top 8	24	Top 3	Team Win	IN	Top 6	13	Team Lose	IN		Top 4	28	Elim	Eliminated (ep 19)	
Chandler	Top 20	IN	Team 1st	I.T. Winner	Top 12	18	IN	Team 1st	IN	Top 8	28	IN	Btm 3	IN	Btm 6	4	Team Win	IN		Elim	15	Eliminated (ep 18)		
Lily	Top 20	IN	Team 2nd	IN	Top 12	18	IN	Team 1st	IN	Top 8	28	IN	Team Win	Top 6	Top 6	12	Team Lose	Top 3		Elim	25	Eliminated (ep 18)		
Kieren	Top 20	IN	Team 1st	IN	Top 12	10	IN	Team 4th	IN	Btm 6	16	IN	Btm 3	I.T. Winner	Elim	9	Eliminated (ep 15)							
Madi	Top 20	I.T. Winner	Team 3rd	IN	Top 12	16	IN	Team 3rd	IN	Top 8	22	IN	Team Win	IN	Elim	9	Eliminated (ep 15)							
Miraede	Top 20	IN	Team 2nd	IN	Top 12	13	Top 4	Team 2nd	IN	Top 8	22	IN	Btm 3	IN	Elim	5	Eliminated (ep 15)							
Steven	Top 20	IN	Team 1st	IN	Top 12	10	Top 4	Team 2nd	IN	Btm 8	19	IN	Team Lose	IN	Elim	7	Eliminated (ep 15)							
Dee	Top 20	IN	Team 1st	IN	Top 12	10	IN	Team 3rd	IN	Elim	19	Eliminated (ep 11)												
Gracie	Top 20	IN	Team 3rd	IN	Top 12	10	IN	Team 2nd	IN	Elim	18	Eliminated (ep 11)												
Marcus	Top 20	IN	Team 4th	IN	Btm 6	5	IN	Team 1st	IN	Elim	15	Eliminated (ep 11)												
Tom	Top 20	IN	Team 4th	IN	Btm 8	6	IN	Team 3rd	IN	Elim	12	Eliminated (ep 11)												
Aya	Top 20	IN	Team 3rd	IN	Elim	6	Eliminated (ep 7)																	
Caroline	Top 20	IN	Team 4th	IN	Elim	5	Eliminated (ep 7)																	
Hannah	Top 20	IN	Team 3rd	IN	Elim	7	Eliminated (ep 7)																	
Jade	Top 20	IN	Team 3rd	Top 3	Elim	9	Eliminated (ep 7)																	
Eliminated	None				Aya Caroline Hannah Jade	None				Dee Gracie Marcus Tom	None				Kieren Madi Miraede Steven	None				Chandler Lily	None	Alysha Indigo	Harry Zac	Jack; 84 points
Eliminated	None				Aya Caroline Hannah Jade	None				Dee Gracie Marcus Tom	None				Kieren Madi Miraede Steven	None				Chandler Lily	None	Alysha Indigo	Harry Zac	Greta; 92 points to win

Preceded by MasterChef Australia (series 3)	MasterChef Australia series 25 September 2011 – 23 November 2011	Succeeded by MasterChef Australia (series 4)
