= MasterChef Australia series 2 =

TV series season of MasterChef Australia

MasterChef Australia
- Season 2
- Judges: Matt Preston; George Calombaris; Gary Mehigan
- No. of contestants: 24
- Winner: Adam Liaw
- Runner-up: Callum Hann
- No. of episodes: 84

Release
- Original network: Network Ten
- Original release: 19 April – 25 July 2010

Series chronology
- ← Previous; Series 1 Next → Series 3

The second series of the Australian cookery game show MasterChef Australia premiered on 19 April 2010 on Network Ten, concluding on 25 July 2010 when Adam Liaw was named the winner.

The series finale was predicted to be such a success with ratings that it forced a national election debate between Prime Minister Julia Gillard and Opposition Leader Tony Abbott to a different time slot due to a fear of low ratings.

The "Winner Announced" was watched by an average national audience of 5.29 million, peaking at 5.74 million. The consolidated 5 city metropolitan audience was 4.03 million (the second highest rating program since the current ratings system began in 2001) and the consolidated regional audience was 1.26 million.

== Changes ==
The second series of MasterChef Australia brought some changes to the format of the show. Most notably, Sarah Wilson, host of Series 1, is not present in the second series, with producers opting instead to use the show's three judges as hosts.

Furthermore, Series 2 began with the 'Top 50' component of the show, as opposed to the auditions phase. This allows for the audience to begin identifying and connect with contestants while allowing for more time to be spent in the actual competition phase of the show.

Another change to the show is the reward for winning a Celebrity Chef Challenge. In Series 1, the winner would receive a free pass through to the final week of the competition. This was problematic in that it removed the contestant from the show altogether, meaning they didn't keep themselves in the pressured situations that the others had. Instead, in Series 2, a successful contestant will now receive an 'Immunity Pin', which they could use at any time during the competition to save themselves from elimination except in finals week. Out of all the Celebrity Chef Challenges, only Marion managed to win the immunity pin by defeating a Celebrity Chef (Adam also won an immunity pin, but not by defeating a Celebrity Chef).

Also different in Series 2 is the elimination after a team challenge. In Series 1, all the contestants from the losing team had to vote off someone from the competition. This was problematic in that contestants might vote off the best contestants in hopes of improving their chances of winning the show. Instead, in Series 2, the elimination process has changed. A variety of different challenges have been used to determine which member of the losing team is eliminated:

- Basic Skills Test – contestants perform tasks testing basic skills, such as separating egg yolks and whites, making a pesto sauce or naming herbs. Such challenges may be split into rounds, with a 'best of 3' method used, the judges may choose the worst performer or else a sudden death elimination process is used.
- "Fix that Dish" – contestants are given a badly prepared dish, and are tasked with fixing it. The judges eliminate the contestant whose dish is the least impressive.
- "Name that Dish" - contestants are given an array of dishes of the same type, for example, cakes, and asked to name them to gain safety, incorrect naming results in elimination or sending to the next round.
- Taste Test – contestants take turns naming ingredients in a provided dish (such as a bouillabaisse or a curry). The first contestant to either name an ingredient that is not in the dish or to fail to name an ingredient is eliminated.
- Mystery Box – in a variation of the regular Mystery Box Challenge, team members are tasked with preparing a dish that also fits a criterion (for example, complementing a bottle of wine)

Furthermore, the selection of members from the losing team to face elimination has varied. In some weeks, the judges select the worst two performers, in other weeks the entire team must compete in the elimination challenge. In one week, the team members had to nominate three members themselves.

From Week 4, Donna Hay replaced Gary Mehigan on the judging panel during the Celebrity Chef Challenges. This was done to allow Mehigan to act as a facilitator in the kitchen during the challenge (this was ex-host Sarah Wilson's role in Series 1).

During the filming of Week 7, Mehigan injured his leg, and consequently was unable to film episodes. During the time in which he was injured, Matt Moran acted as a fill-in judge starting from Celebrity Chef Challenge 6 and continuing until Mehigan returned during Week 8.

== Euro Week ==
Airing from 20 June, the remaining eight MasterChef contestants travelled to London for the first stop in "Euro Week". Later in the week they went to Paris, where they competed in what has been called the "ultimate super-challenge". Celebrity Cooks who have appeared include Jamie Oliver, Heston Blumenthal, Martin Blunos and Brett Graham. The Icelandic volcano eruption in 2010 caused filming to be delayed.

== Contestants ==
The top 24 contestants were chosen throughout the first week of challenges amongst the top 50. The full group of 24 were revealed on Sunday, 25 April:

Contestant	Age	State	Occupation	Status
Adam Liaw	31	SA	Lawyer	Winner 25 July
Callum Hann	20	SA	Student	Runner-up 25 July
Claire Winton Burn	31	VIC	Lawyer	Eliminated 22 July
Jimmy Seervai	31	NSW	Food Ingredient Researcher	Re-eliminated 21 July; Returned 28 June; First eliminated 31 May
Courtney Roulston	30	NSW	Bar manager	Re-eliminated 20 July; Returned 28 June; First eliminated 13 May
Alvin Quah	35	NSW	Scientific Affairs Manager	Eliminated 19 July
Aaron Harvie	37	NSW	Band manager	Eliminated 15 July
Jonathan Daddia	33	NSW	IT Consultant	Eliminated 12 July
Marion Grasby	27	SA	Student	Eliminated 8 July
Peter Kritikides	29	VIC	Lawyer	Re-eliminated 5 July; Returned 28 June; First eliminated 7 June
Joanne Zalm	37	NSW	Mother	Eliminated 24 June
Matthew Caldicott	21	NSW	Accountant	Eliminated 17 June
Sharnee Rawson	21	QLD	Law Student	Eliminated 14 June
Skye Craig	35	QLD	Graphic Designer	Eliminated 10 June
Jake Bujayer	29	NSW	Cement Renderer	Eliminated 3 June
Fiona Inglis	24	VIC	Teacher	Eliminated 27 May
Carrie Johnston	34	NSW	Ex-Human Resources Manager	Eliminated 24 May
Philip Vakos	27	TAS	Auditor	Eliminated 20 May
Daniel Aulsebrook	32	VIC	Recently made redundant	Eliminated 17 May
Dominic Corrigan	46	NSW	Company Director	Eliminated 10 May
Adele Fragnito	49	SA	Hairdresser	Eliminated 6 May
Kate Nugara	30	VIC	Teacher	Eliminated 3 May
Devon Headland	30	QLD	Builder	Eliminated 29 April
Sarah Carmichael	30	VIC	Police Detective	Quit 28 April

Future appearances

- Callum Hann appeared on the 1st Junior Series as a guest judge.
- In Series 3 Alvin Quah and Jimmy Seervai gave cooking lessons at masterclass.
- In Series 4 Adam Liaw appeared as a guest judge for a Mystery Box Challenge.
- Callum took part in a Special All Star Series for Charity along with Marion Grasby, Jonathan Daddia and Aaron Harvie. Aaron came 11th, Jonathan came 9th, Marion came 8th and Callum became the winner.
- In Series 5 Adam appeared at the Grand Final.
- In Series 6 Adam appeared as a guest judge for a Mystery Box Challenge and invention Test.
- In a Superstar themed week on Series 7 Callum as a guest chef for an Immunity challenge where he managed to win over Series 7 contestant Anna Webster and appeared for a masterclass.
- In Series 10 Adam appeared at the auditions to support the Top 50, while Callum appeared during South Australian week for a masterclass. Later at the Semi Finals round Callum & Alvin appeared along with Courtney Roulston & Philip Vakos as guests.
- Callum & Courtney appeared on Series 12. Courtney was eliminated on 21 April 2020, finishing 23rd and Callum was eliminated on 14 July 2020, finishing 4th.
- Callum also appeared in Series 13 as a guest judge for an elimination challenge.
- In Series 14 Alvin appeared for another chance to win the title. Alvin was eliminated on 3 July 2022, finishing 6th for the second time.
- In Series 16 Callum & Alvin appeared as guests for the 1st service challenge.
- Callum appeared in Series 17 for a 3rd chance to win. Callum placed runner up for the 2nd time on 12 August 2025.

== Special guests ==
- Donna Hay – Top 50 Pressure Test 1, Celebrity Chef Challenge 3–6, 8, 10 onwards, MasterClass 10
- Matt Moran – Top 50 Pressure Test 2, MasterClass 1, Celebrity Chef Challenge 6, MasterClass 7, Celebrity Chef Challenge 7, Finale Night
- Neil Perry – Top 50 Pressure Test 3, Team Challenge 8
- Luke Nguyen – Celebrity Chef Challenge 1, MasterClass 2
- Luke Mangan – Team Challenge Reward 1
- Peter Gilmore – Pressure Test 1, MasterClass 6, Finale Night
- Philippa Sibley – Celebrity Chef Challenge 2
- Nathan Darling – Team Challenge Reward 2
- Shaun Presland – MasterClass 3, Celebrity Chef Challenge 12
- Justin North – Celebrity Chef Challenge 3, MasterClass 4, MasterClass Reunion
- Tony Bilson – Team Challenge 3
- Michel Roux – Team Challenge 3
- Tetsuya Wakuda – Team Challenge 3
- Guillaume Brahimi – Team Challenge 3
- Giovanni Pilu – Team Challenge Reward 3
- Kumar Mahadevan – MasterClass 4
- Adam Humphrey – Celebrity Chef Challenge 4
- Lovaine Allen – Celebrity Chef Challenge 4
- Aaron Eady – Celebrity Chef Challenge 4
- Curtis Stone – Team Challenge 4
- Ty Bellingham – Team Challenge Reward 4
- Peter Kuruvita – MasterClass 5, MasterClass Reunion
- Stephanie Alexander – Pressure Test 4
- Frank Camorra – Celebrity Chef Challenge 5
- Glenn Thompson – Team Challenge Reward 5
- Rick Stein – Pressure Test 5
- Maggie Beer – Celebrity Chef Challenge 6, Finals Week Elimination 3
- Mark Jensen – Team Challenge Reward 6
- Fergus Henderson – Masterclass 7
- Damien Pignolet – Pressure Test 6
- Ian Curley – Celebrity Chef Challenge 7
- Kylie Kwong – Celebrity Chef Challenge 7, Masterclass 8, Signature Dish Challenge
- Brent Savage – Team Challenge 7
- Ryan Squires – Team Challenge 7
- David Chang – Team Challenge Reward 7
- Darren Purchese – Masterclass 8
- Will Studd – Masterclass 8
- Julie Goodwin – Invention Test 8, Masterclass 9
- Josh Emett – Celebrity Chef Challenge 8
- Warren Turnbull – Team Challenge Reward 8
- Michael Klausen – Masterclass 9
- Cherish Finden – Invention Test 9
- Jamie Oliver – Invention Test Reward 1
- Heston Blumenthal – Pressure Test 8
- John Torode – Celebrity Chef Challenge 9
- Gregg Wallace – Celebrity Chef Challenge 9
- Martin Blunos – Celebrity Chef Challenge 9
- Franck Poupard – Super Challenge
- Shane Osbourne – Super Challenge Reward
- Brett Graham – Elimination Challenge 9
- Mitchell Orr – Celebrity Chef Challenge 10
- Jan ter Heerdt – Masterclass 11
- Margaret Fulton – Invention Test 10
- Adriano Zumbo – Pressure Test 9, Finals Week Elimination 1
- Adam Melonas – Celebrity Chef Challenge 11
- Sean Moran – Team Challenge Reward 9
- Lauren Murdoch – Masterclass 12
- Christine Manfield – Pressure Test 10, Masterclass 13
- Alla Wolf-Tasker – Signature Dish Challenge
- Mark Best – Signature Dish Challenge
- Jacques Reymond – Signature Dish Challenge
- Hiroyuki Sakai – Invention Test 12
- Shannon Bennett – Finals Week Elimination 2

Many of the guest chefs returned for the announcement of the winner.

== Elimination chart ==
No.	Week	1	2		3		4		5		6		7		8		9		10			11	12		13		Finals					
No.	Mystery Box Challenge Winner	None	Callum Fiona Joanne Matthew		Marion		Skye		Peter		Fiona		Marion		Claire		Marion		None			None	Alvin		Rickyz		None					
No.	Invention Test Winner	None	Alvin		Callum		Jonathan		Aaron Joanne Matthew		Marion		Aaron		Aaron Adam		Jonathan		Callum			None	Adam Claire		None		Alvin; Courtney; Jimmy	None				
No.	Celebrity Chef Challenges	None	Lose: Alvin		Lose: Callum		Lose: Jonathan		Lose: Aaron Joanne Matthew		Win: Marion		Lose: Aaron		Win: Adam		Lose: Jonathan		Lose: Marion			Lose: Everyone	Lose: Claire		Lose: Claire		None					
1	Adam	Top 24	IN	Team Win	IN	Team Win	IN	Team Lose	IN	Team Draw	IN	Team Win	IN	Team Win	I.T. Winner	Team Win	IN	Team Win	IN	IN	Btm 4	Team Lose	I.T. Winner	Team Lose/Imm.	IN	IN	Btm 3	Top 3	Top 2	Top 2	Win	WINNER
2	Callum	Top 24	IN	Team Lose	I.T. Winner	Team Win	IN	Team Win	IN	Btm 4	IN	Team Lose	IN	Team Lose	Btm 4	Team Win	Btm 3	Team Win	I.T. Winner	IN	Team Win	Team Win	IN	Team Win	IN	Top 3	Btm 3	Btm 3	Win	Top 2	Btm 2	Runner-Up
3	Claire	Top 24	IN	Team Lose	IN	Team Win	IN	Team Win	IN	Team Draw	IN	Team Win	IN	Team Win	Top 4	Team Win	IN	Team Lose	IN	IN	Top 4	Team Lose	I.T. Winner	Team Win	I.T. Winner	Win	Btm 3	Top 3	Btm 2	Btm 2	Elim	Eliminated (Ep 82)
4	Jimmy	Top 24	Top 3	Team Win	IN	Team Win	IN	Team Win	IN	Team Draw	Btm 3	Btm 3	Elim	Eliminated (Ep 37)								Btm 2	IN	Team Win	Btm 3	Btm 3	I.T. Winner	Win	IN	Elim	Re-Eliminated (Ep 81)	
5	Courtney	Top 24	IN	Team Win	IN	Team Lose	Top 2	Elim	Eliminated (Ep 22)													Team Win	IN	Team Win	Btm 3	Top 3	I.T. Winner	Btm 3	Elim	Re-Eliminated (Ep 80)		
6	Alvin	Top 24	I.T. Winner	Team Win	Top 3	Team Lose	IN	Team Lose	Btm 3	Team Draw	IN	Team Win	Top 6	Team Win	IN	Team Lose	Top 3	Team Lose	IN	Top 2	Btm 4	Team Win	Btm 4	Team Win	IN	Btm 2	I.T. Winner	Elim	Eliminated (Ep 79)			
7	Aaron	Top 24	IN	Team Lose	IN	Team Lose	IN	Team Win	I.T. Winner	Team Draw	IN	Team Lose	I.T. Winner	Team Lose	I.T. Winner	Team Lose	IN	Team Win	IN	IN	Top 4	Btm 2	Btm 4	Btm 2	IN	Elim	Eliminated (Ep 76)					
8	Jonathan	Top 24	IN	Btm 2	IN	Btm 2	I.T. Winner	Team Win	IN	Btm 4	IN	Team Lose	Top 6	Team Lose	Top 4	Btm 2	I.T. Winner	Team Lose	Top 3	IN	Btm 2	Team Win	IN	Team Lose	Elim	Eliminated (Ep 73)						
9	Marion	Top 24	IN	Team Win	Top 3	Team Win	IN	Team Lose	IN	Team Draw	I.T. Winner	Imm.	Top 6	Btm 3/Imm.	IN	Team Win	Top 3	Team Lose	Top 3	Win	Team Win	Team Win	Btm 4	Elim	Eliminated (Ep 70)							
10	Peter	Top 24	IN	Team Win	IN	Team Win	IN	Team Lose	IN	Team Draw	Btm 3	Team Win	IN	Team Win	Elim	Eliminated (Ep 43)						Team Lose	Elim	Re-Eliminated (Ep 67)								
11	Joanne	Top 24	IN	Team Win	IN	Team Win	Btm 3	Team Win	I.T. Winner	Team Draw	IN	Team Lose	Top 6	Btm 3	Btm 4	Team Lose	IN	Team Win	IN	IN	Elim	Eliminated (Ep 58)										
12	Matthew	Top 24	IN	Team Lose	IN	Team Win	Btm 3	Team Win	I.T. Winner	Team Draw	IN	Btm 3	Btm 3	Team Lose	IN	Team Win	Btm 3	Elim	Eliminated (Ep 52)													
13	Sharnee	Top 24	IN	Team Lose	IN	Team Lose	IN	Btm 3	IN	Team Draw	Top 3	Team Win	Top 6	Team Win	IN	Team Lose	Elim	Eliminated (Ep 49)														
14	Skye	Top 24	IN	Team Lose	IN	Team Win	IN	Team Lose	IN	Team Draw	Top 3	Team Win	IN	Team Win	Btm 4	Elim	Eliminated (Ep 46)															
15	Jake	Top 24	IN	Team Lose	IN	Team Lose	IN	Team Lose	IN	Team Draw	IN	Team Win	Btm 3	Elim	Eliminated (Ep 40)																	
16	Fiona	Top 24	IN	Team Lose	Btm 3	Team Win	IN	Team Win	Btm 3	Team Draw	IN	Elim	Eliminated (Ep 34)																			
17	Carrie	Top 24	IN	Team Win	Btm 3	Team Lose	IN	Team Win	IN	Btm 4	Elim	Eliminated (Ep 31)																				
18	Philip	Top 24	IN	Team Win	IN	Team Lose	IN	Team Win	IN	Elim	Eliminated (Ep 28)																					
19	Daniel	Top 24	IN	Team Win	IN	Team Win	IN	Btm 3	Elim	Eliminated (Ep 25)																						
20	Dominic	Top 24	IN	Team Lose	IN	Team Lose	Elim	Eliminated (Ep 19)																								
21	Adele	Top 24	Top 3	Team Win	IN	Elim	Eliminated (Ep 16)																									
22	Kate	Top 24	IN	Team Win	Elim	Eliminated (Ep 13)																										
23	Devon	Top 24	IN	Elim	Eliminated (Ep 10)																											
24	Sarah	Top 24	IN	Quit	Withdrew (Ep 9)																											
	Notes	^{See note 1}	^{See note 2}	None				^{See note 3}	^{See note 4}	^{See note 5}	^{See note 6}	^{See note 7}	^{See note 8}	^{See note 9}	^{See note 10}	None			^{See note 11}	^{See note 12}	None	^{See note 13}	^{See note 14}	^{See note 15}	^{See note 16}	None	^{See note 17}	^{See note 18}	^{See note 19}	^{See note 20}	^{See note 21}	^{See note 22}
	Eliminated	None	None	Sarah; Devon	Kate	Adele	Dominic	Courtney; 1st Elimination	Daniel	Philip	Carrie	Fiona	Jimmy; 1st Elimination	Jake	Peter; 1st Elimination	Skye	Sharnee	Matthew	None	None	Joanne	None	Peter; Re-Elimination	Marion	Jonathan	Aaron	None	Alvin	Courtney; Re-Elimination	Jimmy; Re-Elimination	Claire	Callum; 82 points
	Eliminated	None	None	Sarah; Devon	Kate	Adele	Dominic	Courtney; 1st Elimination	Daniel	Philip	Carrie	Fiona	Jimmy; 1st Elimination	Jake	Peter; 1st Elimination	Skye	Sharnee	Matthew	None	None	Joanne	None	Peter; Re-Elimination	Marion	Jonathan	Aaron	None	Alvin	Courtney; Re-Elimination	Jimmy; Re-Elimination	Claire	Adam; 89 points to win

- ^1 In Week 1, nobody from the top 24 was eliminated. During this week the judges selected the twenty-four finalists from the top 50.
- ^2 In Week 2, instead of the traditional Invention Test, contestants were asked to recreate a favourite childhood food memory. There was no Bottom 3 for this challenge.
- ^3 In Week 4, the entire losing team faced off in two Elimination Challenge rounds. The Bottom 3 were decided from the first challenge, and had to compete in the second challenge.
- ^4 In Week 5, contestants were grouped in threes for the Invention Test and the winning team all competed in the Celebrity Chef challenge.
- ^5 Also in Week 5, the Team Challenge was a dead heat. The bottom two contestants from each team were sent into the Elimination Challenge.
- ^6 In Week 6, there was no Mystery Box challenge. Instead, contestants took part in a pizza making challenge.
- ^7 Also in Week 6, Marion, as Invention Test winner, was not in either team and so was safe from elimination. She joined the winning team on their reward. Further, the entire losing team faced elimination, from which a Bottom 3 was selected.
- ^8 In Week 7, the calibre of dishes in the Invention Test was such that a Top 6 was selected.
- ^9 Also in Week 7, contestants in the losing team from the Team Challenge were asked to select the bottom 3 performers themselves. In the subsequent Elimination Challenge, Marion chose to use her immunity pin and not take part in the challenge.
- ^10 In Week 8, contestants were paired up for the Invention Test and the winning pair competed against each other to win immunity in a modified Celebrity Chef Challenge.
- ^11 In Week 10, as part of "Euro Week," there was no Mystery Box Challenge, and therefore the advantages gained by winning it were negated. There was no Bottom 3 for the Invention Test.
- ^12 Also in Week 10, as part of "Euro Week," the Pressure Test was not an elimination challenge, but contestants competed to win the chance to take part in the Celebrity Chef Challenge. Marion won the challenge.
- ^13 In Week 11, there was no Invention Test and no Pressure Test elimination. Instead, eleven previously eliminated contestants returned to compete to win a spot back in the competition. In the following Celebrity Chef Challenge, the Top 10 contestants all competed against the Celebrity Chef for a chance at immunity. In the Elimination Challenge, neither Aaron nor Jimmy was eliminated as the judges could not agree on the worst dish.
- ^14 In Week 12, contestants were paired up for the Invention Test and the winning pair had to decide which of them would compete in the Celebrity Chef Challenge. As Adam already had an immunity pin and it was Claire's first Invention Test win, Adam deferred to Claire.
- ^15 Also in Week 12, Adam chose to use his immunity pin and not take part in the Elimination challenge following the Team Challenge.
- ^16 In Week 13, there was only a Bottom 3 for the Invention Test, with the winner of the Mystery Box Challenge gaining the advantages normally given to the Invention Test winner. As the winner, Claire did not take part in the Invention Test, and therefore escaped possible elimination.
- ^17 On Sunday, Finals Week, contestants split into two teams to compete in the Invention Test. The winning team's prize was an advantage in the Pressure Test that all contestants would compete in the following day. They were shown the dish and given the recipe for it, thus giving them the night to prepare.
- ^18 On Monday, Finals Week, contestants faced a Pressure Test. Having won the challenge, Jimmy was given an advantage in the Mystery Box Challenge that all contestants would compete in the following day: the power to choose the contents for the Mystery Box.
- ^19 On Tuesday, Finals Week, contestants faced a Mystery Box Challenge.
- ^20 On Wednesday, Finals Week, contestants faced a "Cookbook Challenge," where they made dishes they would include in their cookbook, should they win the title. There was no winner for this challenge.
- ^21 On Thursday, Finals Week, contestants prepared a three course meal for the governor general, Her Excellency Quentin Bryce and thirty of her guests.
- ^22 Adam and Callum competed against each other in three rounds consisting of a Basic Skills and Knowledge Test, an Invention Test and a Pressure Test. Points were awarded for each test, with the winner decided based on the final tally after the three rounds.

== Episodes and Ratings ==
Ep#/Wk-Ep#	Original airdate	Episode Title / Event	Total viewers (5 Metro Cities)	Nightly Ranking	Weekly Ranking (Sun/Overall Mon-Thurs/Fri)
Week 1
1/01-1	Monday 19 April 2010	Series Premiere: Top 50 Part 1 – The top 50 began with a barbecue challenge, with the freedom to cook whatever they wanted. The 10 worst performers were sent into a pavlova pressure test led by Donna Hay. The 5 contestants who produced the worst pavlovas were eliminated from the competition.	1,695,000	1st	2nd
2/01-2	Tuesday 20 April 2010	Top 50 Part 2 – The remaining contestants were asked to prepare their signature dish. In a first for MasterChef Australia the contestants did the judging, with the men voting for their favourite dish from the women, and vice versa. The top 7 vote-getters (4 women, 3 men) were then put into a beef wellington pressure test, with the best man and woman progressing directly to the top 24. The winners, Claire and Jimmy, were the first pair to advance to the Top 24.	1,536,000	1st	7th
3/01-3	Wednesday 21 April 2010	Top 50 Part 3 – The 10 contestants who performed worst in Tuesday's signature dish challenge were split into 5 groups of 2 and given 7 hours to drive out to local farms, collect fresh produce, and return to the MasterChef kitchen to prepare a main and a dessert. One contestant, Andrea, found the challenge difficult, and realised that MasterChef was not for her; her withdrawal from the competition forced her partner in the challenge, Philip, to prepare both dishes on his own. Despite this setback, he and 4 others kept their spots in the competition, while 5 contestants were eliminated.	1,611,000	1st	3rd
4/01-4	Thursday 22 April 2010	Top 50 Part 4 – With 10 spots in the Top 24 on the line, the remaining contestants competed in a mise en place challenge. The challenge had 4 stages, with the worst performers in each stage removed by Gary and George. The first stage involved separating egg yolks and whites. The second asked the contestants to julienne carrots. In the third, the first 10 contestants to shuck 12 oysters satisfactorily moved onto the final stage, wherein Marion, Adele, Courtney and Daniel successfully cut 6 fillets of salmon weighing between 170g and 190g first, gaining their places in the Top 24. Following the mise en place challenge, the remaining contestants had to follow a recipe from Matt Moran, with poor performers gradually eliminated in stages. 10 contestants had their dishes tasted, with Jonathan, Peter, Aaron, Adam, Kate B. and Philip impressing the judges the most, winning their spots in the Top 24.	1,580,000	1st	5th
5/01-5	Friday 23 April 2010	MasterClass 1	1,093,000	5th	29th
Week 2
6/02-1	Sunday 25 April 2010	Top 50 Part 5 – The remaining contestants participated in 2 challenges to attempt to qualify for the last spots in the top 24. The first challenge was a Mystery Box challenge which, for the first time in MasterChef Australia, was focused solely on desserts. The best desserts which were made by Callum, Matthew, Fiona and Joanne, granted the latter spots in the top 24. The remaining contestants competed in a Pressure Test led by celebrity chef Neil Perry. The 9 contestants who best replicated Perry's snapper dish took the last spots in the top 24. (9 spots were available since Kate B. chose to withdraw from the competition to be with her family.) In the end, Alvin, Sharnee, Dominic, Carrie, Kate N., Skye, Devon, Sarah, and Jake completed the Top 24.	1,282,000	4th	11th
7/02-2	Monday 26 April 2010	Top 24 Cooking Challenge – The contestants competed in their first challenge in the MasterChef kitchen: preparing a meal that rekindled memories of their childhood. Alvin won the right to contest the first Celebrity Chef Challenge of the series.	1,693,000	1st	7th (1,446,000)
8/02-3	Tuesday 27 April 2010	Celebrity Chef Challenge 1 – Luke Nguyen beat Alvin (26–22)	1,558,000	1st	7th (1,446,000)
9/02-4	Wednesday 28 April 2010	Off Site Challenge 1 – Winner: Red Team. The off site team challenge, to take over the running of two Italian restaurants, saw the Red Team conquer despite having a simpler menu. From the Blue Team, Jonathan and Devon were selected by the judges as the two worst performers and were up for elimination. Sarah withdrew from the competition to return to her family.	1,510,000	1st	7th (1,446,000)
10/02-5	Thursday 29 April 2010	Elimination Challenge 1 – As the Red Team enjoyed their reward: lunch and a mini MasterClass with Luke Mangan, Jonathan and Devon faced off in the Elimination Challenge; a best of three challenge with the theme: eggs. Jonathan won the first round; to correctly name different birds' eggs. The next round Jonathan and Devon raced to be the first to beat egg whites to stiff peaks. Jonathan won the round and the challenge, and Devon was eliminated.	1,531,000	1st	7th (1,446,000)
11/02-6	Friday 30 April 2010	MasterClass 2 – The judges share their own food memories in this week's MasterClass. A good old English Sunday Roast was Gary's dish of the day while George cooked up lasagne with a twist.	1,139,000	3rd	7th (1,446,000)
Week 3
12/03-1	Sunday 2 May 2010	Invention Test 2 – Japanese theme. The Mystery Box challenge saw the contestants making the "perfect burger", with only five selected to taste by the judges which were Adam, Courtney, Jonathan, Marion and Matthew. Marion won the challenge and picked tuna as the core ingredient for the Invention Test. With a Japanese theme, Adam was favourite to win the challenge but it was Callum who triumphed.	1,532,000	2nd	3rd
13/03-2	Monday 3 May 2010	Pressure Test Elimination 1 – Carrie, Kate and Fiona faced off in the Pressure Test after cooking the three least impressive dishes in the Invention Test. They were asked to replicate a chicken dish from chef Peter Gilmore. Fiona had a slow start but she finished strongly and cooked the chicken perfectly but her dish lacked detail. Despite a strong start, Kate failed to read her recipe thoroughly, she wrapped up her chicken too much that it didn't cook properly and she ended up serving the judges raw chicken although her vegetables were perfectly cooked. Carrie struggled through the whole challenge, she cooked the chicken perfectly but all the flavour leaked out in the water bath because she left a hole in her chicken's skin and her vegetables were undercooked. In the end Kate was eliminated.	1,693,000	1st	2nd (1,541,000)
14/03-3	Tuesday 4 May 2010	Celebrity Chef Challenge 2 – Philippa Sibley beat Callum (28–22)	1,619,000	1st	2nd (1,541,000)
15/03-4	Wednesday 5 May 2010	Off Site Challenge 2 – Winner: Blue Team. In an unprecedented twist, Callum as winner of the weeks Invention Test was granted the power to pick his entire team first. He selected Adam, Claire, Jimmy, Marion, Peter, Joanne, Matthew, Skye, Fiona, and Daniel to join him, leaving Courtney, Alvin, Aaron, Sharnee, Jake, Adele, Jonathan, Carrie, and Phillip to form the red team. The off site challenge was to put on a children's birthday party for 150 people, who would vote for their favourite dish. The Blue Team proved to have too great an advantage and won easily. From the Red Team, Jonathan and Adele were the lowest point scorers and were up for elimination.	1,799,000	1st	2nd (1,541,000)
16/03-5	Thursday 6 May 2010	Elimination Challenge 2 – As the Blue Team enjoyed their reward at Sails on Lavender Bay with Nathan Darling, Jonathan and Adele faced off in a "fix the dish" challenge. They had to fix a poorly made dish (a bolognese sauce) in ten steps, each step adding their choice of a range of ingredients. In the end, Adele's bolognese couldn't match the complexity of Jonathan's. Adele was eliminated.	1,643,000	1st	2nd (1,541,000)
17/03-6	Friday 7 May 2010	MasterClass 3	1,180,000	5th	2nd (1,541,000)
Week 4
18/04-1	Sunday 9 May 2010	Invention Test 3 – Indian theme. The Mystery Box challenge saw the contestants choosing between a main and a dessert, Matthew, Claire, Skye, Fiona and Carrie's dishes were tasted with Skye's Crispy Duck winning her the challenge and picking goat as key ingredient in the Invention Test. Jimmy was the favourite to win but in the end it was between Courtney and Jonathan with Jonathan being the one whose invention impressed the judges the most. This episode was also Courtney's 30th birthday.	1,548,000	4th	4th
19/04-2	Monday 10 May 2010	Pressure Test Elimination 2 – Dominic, Joanne and Matthew faced off in the Pressure Test; to make a black forest cake. Joanne was able to put off a shaky start and finish strongly, leaving the judges to pick the least impressive of the two men. Dominic's cake only had three layers instead of the five in the recipe, while Matthew left a cherry pit in his cake. In the end it was Dominic who was eliminated.	1,670,000	1st	2nd (1,644,000)
20/04-3	Tuesday 11 May 2010	Celebrity Chef Challenge 3 – Justin North beat Jonathan (26–21)	1,764,000	1st	2nd (1,644,000)
21/04-4	Wednesday 12 May 2010	Off Site Challenge 3 – Winner: Blue Team. Teams were chosen with each member selecting a remaining contestant, beginning with the captains, Jonathan (Blue) and Daniel (Red; chosen by Jonathan). The two teams were then tasked with preparing a Classic French three-course meal for Matt Preston, Tetsuya Wakuda and Guillaume Brahimi. Michel Roux mentored the Red Team, Tony Bilson mentored the Blue Team. In the end, the Blue team won, as the Red team's main dish, though well prepared, was not deemed to be of a Classic French Cuisine. The entire Red Team was put up for elimination.	1,741,000	1st	2nd (1,644,000)
22/04-5	Thursday 13 May 2010	Elimination Challenge 3 – While the Blue Team enjoyed their lunch with Giovanni Pilu, the Red Team faced off in a two-round Elimination challenge. The first challenge was to make a traditional Genovese Pesto completely by hand in ten minutes, from which, only Marion's was of an acceptable quality, with Sharnee, Courtney and Daniel as the worst of the rest. Those three then competed in the second round of the challenge: naming herbs. Courtney incorrectly named mint "spearmint" and was eliminated.	1,581,000	1st	2nd (1,644,000)
23/04-6	Friday 14 May 2010	MasterClass 4- The judges serve up duck two ways and invite guest chef Kumar Mahadevan to cook a spicy prawn curry. Justin North also helps the contestants make crackling pork.	996,000	5th	38th
Week 5
24/05-1	Sunday 16 May 2010	Invention Test 4 – "Around the world" theme. The Mystery Box challenge saw the contestants tackle a complex range of ingredients and a time of just 25 minutes. Peter took out the challenge and was given a significant advantage in the Invention Test, which for the first time would see the contestants competing in trios. Peter was given the power to not only pick the core ingredient for each country's cuisine, but also to pick the members of each team. Team Mexico impressed the most and Aaron, Joanne and Matthew all proceeded to the Celebrity Chef Challenge. While Team Britain (Alvin, Daniel and Fiona) were the least impressive and faced elimination.	1,675,000	1st	2nd
25/05-2	Monday 17 May 2010	Pressure Test Elimination 3 – Alvin, Daniel and Fiona faced off in the Pressure Test; to recreate a Pork Schnitzel with chips and coleslaw with no recipe to follow. While each contestant cooked the correct meat, Daniel and Fiona were under the impression that they were cooking veal. Aside from that, each dish had its shortcomings: Alvin failed to flatten his meat and it was undercooked, Daniel's meat was overcooked and he used shop-bought mayonnaise in his coleslaw, and Fiona used packaged breadcrumbs instead of fresh. Ultimately, Daniel's dish impressed the least and he was eliminated.	1,741,000	1st	3rd (1,675,000)
26/05-3	Tuesday 18 May 2010	Celebrity Chef Challenge 4 – Team "Restaurant Arras" (Adam Humphrey, Lovaine Allen, Aaron Eady) beat Aaron, Joanne and Matthew (22–19)	1,539,000	2nd	3rd (1,675,000)
27/05-4	Wednesday 19 May 2010	Off Site Challenge 4 – No winner. The two teams were tasked with preparing a three-course meal for a normal family and judges Matt Preston and Curtis Stone, on a tight budget and time limit. In the end, the families rated each team equally and the judges could not agree on a winner, so the challenge was ruled a tie. Therefore, a bottom 2 was selected from each team, with Callum, Carrie, Jonathan and Philip sent into an Elimination Challenge.	1,695,000	1st	3rd (1,675,000)
28/05-5	Thursday 20 May 2010	Elimination Challenge 4 -As the Blue Team and Red Team enjoyed their lunch at Sailor's Thai, the four contestants were asked to name the ingredients of a traditional Bouillabaisse in a taste test Elimination Challenge. Over half of the ingredients had been correctly named when Philip incorrectly guessed "white wine" and was eliminated.	1,652,000	1st	3rd (1,675,000)
29/05-6	Friday 21 May 2010	MasterClass 5 – Gary cooked braised BBQ’d ribs with homemade sauce and George offered up a Waldorf salad. Guest chef Peter Kuravita from Sydney restaurant Flying Fish, showed the contestants two completely different bug dishes– one with an accompanying shaved fennel and edamame salad and a main dish featuring a spicy ginger and chilli sauce.	1,037,000	5th	34th
Week 6 (Melbourne Week)
30/06-1	Sunday 23 May 2010	Invention Test 5 – "Modern Australia" theme. There was no Mystery Box challenge this week, instead the contestants faced a pizza making challenge. Fiona was the victor and picked tropical fruit as the Invention Test's core ingredient. Many struggled with this sweet choice, while Marion's risky recipe paid off and she was declared the winner. Carrie, Jimmy and Peter were the least impressive and they landed in the Bottom 3.	1,674,000	1st	3rd
31/06-2	Monday 24 May 2010	Pressure Test Elimination 4 – Starting a week of challenges in Melbourne, Carrie, Jimmy and Peter faced off in the Pressure Test. Their task was to recreate a dish by Australian food icon, Stephanie Alexander, a confit duck-neck sausage with grilled duck breast in sour cherry sauce, potato crisps and buttered spinach. Peter, being from Melbourne, was able to source ingredients from Queen Victoria Market quickly and make his way to the Langham Hotel first, followed by Carrie and then Jimmy. In the end, each dish had its problems: Peter's sauce was too floury, Carrie's sauce was too thin, her sausage grainy and she failed to plate up the spinach, and Jimmy's spinach was gritty and his duck breast overcooked. Carrie was eliminated.	1,627,000	1st	2nd (1,677,000)
32/06-3	Tuesday 25 May 2010	Celebrity Chef Challenge 5 – Marion beat Frank Camorra (24–23)	1,644,000	1st	2nd (1,677,000)
33/06-4	Wednesday 26 May 2010	Off Site Challenge 5 – Winner: Red Team. The two teams were faced with their toughest challenge yet: to take over the running of George Calombaris' own restaurant The Press Club on its relaunch, serving a variety of Australian food royalty and celebrities. Each team struggled early with the stresses of running a restaurant, but it was the Blue Team who faced the most obstacles. In the end, the guests' scores for each team came down to the wire, with the Red Team emerging victors. The entire Blue Team was sent into the Elimination Challenge.	1,687,000	1st	2nd (1,677,000)
34/06-5	Thursday 27 May 2010	Elimination Challenge 5 – In a mystery box Elimination Challenge, the Blue Team members were tasked with creating a dish to complement a specific bottle of wine. Although Fiona's dish impressed more than others, it failed to match with the wine, and she eliminated from the competition.	1,740,000	1st	2nd (1,677,000)
35/06-6	Friday 28 May 2010	MasterClass 6 – Gary and George showed the contestants how to make the perfect pizza, while Gary also served up an English rice pudding, and George cooked up some chicken oysters with homous and fatoush.	1,101,000	4th	31st
Week 7
36/07-1	Sunday 30 May 2010	Invention Test 6 – Pasta theme. After a trying Mystery Box challenge featuring lambs' brains which Marion, Peter and Callum dishes were tasted, Marion emerged as winner and picked seafood as the core ingredient for the Invention Test. Most contestants thrived in making their own pasta, leading the judges to award a Top 6, with Aaron wowing with his remarkable invention. Jake, Jimmy and Matthew struggled and found themselves up for elimination.	1,831,000	1st	2nd
37/07-2	Monday 31 May 2010	Pressure Test Elimination 5 – Jake, Jimmy and Matthew faced off in the Pressure Test; to recreate a Rick Stein seafood platter worth $350. Jimmy struggled when preparing the various types of seafood and a lack of attention to detail led to his elimination.	1,818,000	1st	1st (1,881,000)
38/07-3	Tuesday 1 June 2010	Celebrity Chef Challenge 6 – Maggie Beer beat Aaron (27–22)	1,768,000	1st	1st (1,881,000)
39/07-4	Wednesday 2 June 2010	Off Site Challenge 6 – Winner: Red Team. In the biggest Off Site Challenge ever, contestants were faced with preparing 8000 canapés for 2000 guests on the P&O Pacific Jewel, who would vote for their favourite team's menu. Under the guidance of a P&O sous chef (plus an extra helper for the Red Team to make up the numbers), each team prepared 1000 of four different canapés. The Blue Team struggled early and opted to buy the help of another chef for 100 votes. In the end, the Red Team were clear winners, with 1,138 votes to 762. The Blue Team were asked decide on their three least impressive performers, and so Jake, Joanne and Marion were selected to face elimination.	1,968,000	1st	1st (1,881,000)
40/07-5	Thursday 3 June 2010	Elimination Challenge 6 – In a taste test Elimination Challenge, Jake, Joanne and Marion were asked to name the ingredients of a Thai Green Curry. Marion chose to use her immunity pin and did not take part in the challenge. The remaining two quickly ran out of obvious selections and when Jake incorrectly guessed "palm sugar" he was eliminated.	1,869,000	1st	1st (1,881,000)
41/07-6	Friday 4 June 2010	MasterClass 7 – George cooked up ravioli with potato and leek as well as a quail dolmatha with tahini and yoghurt dressing. Meanwhile, guest chef Matt Moran had quesadillias on the menu and a berry and frangipane tart.	1,200,000	4th	24th
Week 8
42/08-1	Sunday 6 June 2010	Invention Test 7 – Vegetarian theme. In a meaty Mystery Box challenge for which Claire, Peter and Skye's Dishes were tasted, it was Claire who managed to impress the most and was given a significant advantage in the Invention Test, which would be contested in pairs. As well as picking the core ingredient, Claire was given the power to choose the pairs for the challenge. In a further twist, they would be cooking to impress six staunch meat-eaters, and the two judges, with their vegetarian meals. Aaron and Adam emerged as winners with their curry, and won the chance to face off in a mystery challenge for immunity. While Callum, Joanne, Peter and Skye were left to face the Pressure Test.	1,890,000	1st	1st
43/08-2	Monday 7 June 2010	Pressure Test Elimination 6 – Callum, Joanne, Peter and Skye faced off in the Pressure Test; to recreate George Calombaris' oyster terrine. Callum's terrine was described as a dog's breakfast but was closest to George's dish in flavour. Peter's dish was good overall but his oysters were overcooked and onions undercooked resulting him being eliminated.	1,864,000	1st	3rd (1,809,000)
44/08-3	Tuesday 8 June 2010	Celebrity Chef Challenge 7 – Adam beat Aaron (3–0). In a twist on the traditional format, Aaron and Adam competed against each other to win immunity. They had 1 hour 45 minutes to complete three dishes with three core ingredients for three Celebrity Chefs, Matt Moran, Kylie Kwong and Ian Curley. The Chefs would then pick their favourite of the two dishes, and the contestant with the most votes would win immunity. Adam was judged best in all three dishes and won himself immunity.	1,691,000	2nd	3rd (1,809,000)
45/08-4	Wednesday 9 June 2010	Off Site Challenge 7 – Winner: Red Team. Teams were tasked with creating a dining experience using principles of molecular gastronomy. With the help of two leaders in innovative cooking, each team was tasked with a specific theme to shape their dining experience. In the end, the Blue Team's carnival experience did not impress as much as the Red Team's beach experience and the entire Blue Team was sent into the Elimination Challenge.	1,799,000	1st	3rd (1,809,000)
46/08-5	Thursday 10 June 2010	Elimination Challenge 7 – In a two-round Elimination Challenge testing basic skills, members of the Blue Team were first asked to cook Chicken Korma. They were provided with all the ingredients but were left to choose which spices to use. Out of the six contestants, only Alvin's attempt was of an acceptable quality with Jonathan and Skye the worst of the rest. They were sent into a sudden death challenge to name spices. Skye incorrectly named cloves as garam masala and was eliminated.	1,785,000	1st	3rd (1,809,000)
47/08-6	Friday 11 June 2010	MasterClass 8 – Callum and Sharnee were treated to a masterclass on Cheese by Australian cheese expert Will Studd, while the remaining contestants were treated to a steak and kidney sandwich by Gary Mehigan and stir-fried Aubergines in Chili sauce by Kylie Kwong. Chef Darren Purchese also demonstrated his 'fruit carnival'.	1,208,000	2nd	22nd
Week 9
48/09-1	Sunday 13 June 2010	Invention Test 8 – "Australian Food Icon" theme. The winner of Masterchef Australia 2009, Julie Goodwin, returned as a guest judge for the Mystery Box Challenge, the ingredients of which were also chosen by her. Alvin, Marion and Callum's dishes were tasted, Marion won the challenge and she chose Chiko Rolls as the food icon contestants had to "re-invent". Jonathan's dish was the most impressive while Callum, Matthew and Sharnee were chosen as the Bottom 3 contestants.	1,665,000	1st	5th
49/09-2	Monday 14 June 2010	Pressure Test Elimination 7 – Callum, Matthew and Sharnee faced off in the Pressure Test, where they had to recreate a Beef Stroganoff with Parsley Fettuccine without a recipe to follow. Each of the contestants identified the correct meat, but each contestant's dish had flaws; Callum's Stroganoff lacked enough sauce and his pasta was overcooked, Matthew put too much tomato paste in his Stroganoff and Sharnee incorrectly used nutmeg instead of paprika. Sharnee was eliminated.	1,930,000	1st	3rd (1,840,000)
50/09-3	Tuesday 15 June 2010	Celebrity Chef Challenge 8 – Josh Emett beat Jonathan (27–22)	1,756,000	2nd	3rd (1,840,000)
51/09-4	Wednesday 16 June 2010	Off Site Challenge 8 – Winner: Red Team. Teams were tasked with creating a three-course menu suitable for Qantas business class passengers. They were required to prepare the food at the MasterChef Kitchen and reheat it in the galley of a Qantas Airbus A380. The judging panel in addition to Gary and Matt included chef Neil Perry and Qantas CEO Alan Joyce. Ultimately, the Red Team's dishes were judged to be more consistent and the entire Blue Team was sent into the Elimination Challenge.	1,783,000	2nd	3rd (1,840,000)
52/09-5	Thursday 17 June 2010	Elimination Challenge 8 – In a taste test Elimination Challenge, all members of the Blue Team were asked to name the ingredients to a carrot cake. Matthew guessed "apricots" but when asked to be more specific he incorrectly guessed "dried apricots" instead of "apricot jam" which was the correct answer and was eliminated.	1,829,000	1st	3rd (1,840,000)
53/09-6	Friday 18 June 2010	MasterClass 9 – Aaron and Marion are treated to a masterclass in artisan baking by Michael Klausen, while Gary and George cook up a dish of lamb backstrap fillet cooked in a Barramundi skin with flesh from the fish, along with a shiitake mushroom sauce and hash browns. Julie Goodwin then returns to the MasterChef kitchen and conjures up a dish of scallops with bacon crunch and cauliflower puree, and Gary and George round it off with an extravagant dessert of bitter chocolate ganache with peanut ice cream, peanut toffee caramel and a honeycomb.	1,244,000	3rd	20th
Week 10 (Euro Week)
54/10-1	Sunday 20 June 2010	Invention Test 9 – "Afternoon Tea" theme. It was revealed to the contestants that this Invention Test would take place in London. After settling in at the Langham Hotel, the contestants first challenge for the week was to invent a pastry, drawing inspiration from one of the Crown Jewels of the United Kingdom. Callum won the challenge and was rewarded with a private MasterClass with Jamie Oliver as well as attending the announcement of the World's 50 Best Restaurants with Matt Preston. Jonathan was chosen by Callum to share the reward.	1,948,000	1st	1st
55/10-2	Monday 21 June 2010	Pressure Test 8 – Contestants competed in pairs to recreate Heston Blumenthal's elaborate signature dishes. Heston praised the contestants' attempts at dishes he'd taken years to perfect with Alvin and Marion's recreation of "Sound of the Sea" deemed the most impressive. Marion was selected as the best performer and went into the Celebrity Chef Challenge.	1,841,000	1st	2nd (1,929,000)
56/10-3	Tuesday 22 June 2010	Celebrity Chef Challenge 9 – Martin Blunos beat Marion (26–24)	1,836,000	1st	2nd (1,929,000)
57/10-4	Wednesday 23 June 2010	Super Challenge – In the first ever Super Challenge, contestants raced from London to Paris, France with the task to create a two-course meal based around the French favourite, the truffle. For the first time, the judges picked the teams: Callum and Marion (Yellow), Adam and Alvin (Red), Jonathan and Joanne (Green), and Aaron and Claire (Blue). Teams had to travel to Paris by the Eurostar, find the truffle shop, buy their ingredients from the market travelling via the Eiffel Tower, and prepare their meals on the banks of the Seine, all in 5 hours. Teams struggled with the language barrier, navigating a foreign city and finding necessary ingredients. In the end, each team faced criticism for their dishes, with Callum and Marion emerging as winners, while Joanne and Jonathan were selected as the worst performers and sent into an Elimination Challenge.	2,039,000	1st	2nd (1,929,000)
58/10-5	Thursday 24 June 2010	Elimination Challenge 9 – In the Elimination Challenge, Joanne and Jonathan both recreated one of Brett Graham's dishes. Although both dishes had positives and negatives, Jonathan's dish was judged to be more impressive and Joanne was eliminated.	1,803,000	1st	2nd (1,929,000)
59/10-6	Friday 25 June 2010	MasterClass 10- Back in Australia, George cooks up a seafood dish of Char Sui salmon with stir-fried winter melon and wood ear mushrooms, while Gary cooks a rhubarb and blackberry crumble souffle. Joanne returns for that masterclass. Later, the remaining seven contestants, without Joanne, visit Donna Hay for some styling tips.	1,265,000	2nd	19th
Week 11
60/11-1	Sunday 27 June 2010	Return Elimination Challenge 1 – Eleven of the 17 eliminated contestants returned to the MasterChef kitchen to compete for three second-chance spots. Devon, Kate, Courtney, Daniel, Philip, Jimmy, Jake, Peter, Skye, Sharnee and Matthew competed in four rounds testing basic skills. In the first round, the eleven contestants had to correctly peel 400 grams of prawns. Sharnee was slowest and was eliminated. The second round saw contestants making the perfect potato mash. Kate was slowest and was eliminated. In the third round, the remaining nine contestants had to make 10 French-style pancakes as quickly as possible. Matthew was eliminated. The final round saw the contestants making Eggs Benedict and Hollandaise sauce with a twenty-minute time limit. Skye and Daniel were the least impressive and were eliminated. The remaining six moved on to the final round.	1,781,000	2nd	4th
61/11-2	Monday 28 June 2010	Return Elimination Challenge 2 – Devon, Courtney, Philip, Jimmy, Jake and Peter competed in the final round for one of 3 spots back in the competition. They were faced with an Invention Test, with the freedom to choose from an extensive range of ingredients. In a twist, it was the Top 7 contestants who were unknowingly deciding their fate; judging the six dishes under the pretence of learning how to critique a dish. The seven plus Matt Preston were unanimous in their decision, with Courtney, Jimmy and Peter winning their place back in the competition.	1,863,000	1st	2nd (1,897,000)
62/11-3	Tuesday 29 June 2010	Celebrity Chef Challenge 10 – Mitchell Orr won. Unlike other Celebrity Chef Challenges, Orr was cooking against all of the remaining 10, with the amateur winner (should there have been one) to receive immunity.	1,837,000	2nd	2nd (1,897,000)
63/11-4	Wednesday 30 June 2010	Off Site Challenge 9 – Winner: Red Team. Teams were faced with a seemingly simple challenge; to bake five traditional Australian afternoon tea staples made famous by the Country Women's Association. They had to impress a crowd of 100 CWA members as well as the judging panel which included CWA veteran Allison Mutton. Each team member was responsible for one dish with the judges picking which team made the best of each separate dish. The contestants struggled with this challenge, to the point where the judges granted them extra time to finish so as to not lose face. When it came to scoring the teams, Claire and Jonathan's Fruit Cakes and Peter and Marion's Neapolitan Cakes were judged to be of such poor standard as to not warrant scoring at all. The Red Team edged out the Blue Team two points to one in the other categories and Aaron and Jimmy were sent into an Elimination Challenge.	2,012,000	1st	2nd (1,897,000)
64/11-5	Thursday 1 July 2010	Elimination Challenge 10 – While the Red Team enjoyed their lunch at Bilson's, Aaron and Jimmy were required to "fix that dish", an unappetising coq au vin. George favoured Jimmy's finished dish but Gary preferred Aaron's. A draw was declared and both contestants returned to the house.	1,761,000	1st	2nd (1,897,000)
65/11-6	Friday 2 July 2010	MasterClass 11 – While Adam and Alvin are treated to a masterclass in chocolate making from Belgian-Australian chocolatier Jan Ter Heerdt, the other contestants are given tips based on their struggles earlier in the week. George cooks up a Mushroom risotto with five types of wild mushroom along with mushroom powder before teaming up with Gary to produce their 'Adults Only' eggs Benedict-Ham Hock terrine with brioche croutons, poached egg and hollandaise sauce. Finally, Gary prepares his 'Gateaux Opera' with Almond sponge, coffee butter cream and chocolate ganache.	1,303,000	3rd	18th
Week 12
66/12-1	Sunday 4 July 2010	Invention Test 10 – "Home-style cooking" theme. Contestants were faced with snails under the Mystery Box, while Adam and Callum's dishes got tasted it was Alvin who impressed the judges with his dish, creating a unique balance of complex flavours. He gained the power to pick the pairs for the Invention Test, and the core ingredient of chicken and oranges. Contestants had to impress renowned Australian cook Margaret Fulton with their home-style inventions and many struggled under the pressure. In the end, it was Adam and Claire who really impressed and Claire was nominated to take part in the Celebrity Chef Challenge. Alvin and Marion, and Aaron and Peter failed to impress and were sent into a Pressure Test elimination.	1,764,000	1st	4th
67/12-2	Monday 5 July 2010	Pressure Test Elimination 9 – Alvin, Aaron, Marion and Peter faced off in the Pressure Test, where they had to recreate Adriano Zumbo's Macaroon Tower. Each contestants had to build their own tower consisting of 120 macaroons. Such a monumental challenge saw the contestants really struggle, each of them forced to cut corners. Half of Aaron's macaroons were "like cake batter" while half of Marion's were "hard as a rock", but it was Peter who Adriano selected as the poorest performer. Peter was eliminated.	2,091,000	1st	1st (2,054,000)
68/12-3	Tuesday 6 July 2010	Celebrity Chef Challenge 11 – Adam Melonas beat Claire (24–21)	1,852,000	1st	1st (2,054,000)
69/12-4	Wednesday 7 July 2010	Off Site Challenge 10 – Winner: Red Team. Teams were faced with preparing a hearty buffet lunch for 100 Australian soldiers. Starting at Holsworthy army base, contestants trekked to the field kitchen where they tackled creating a suitable menu. Teams came up with a few similar dishes and were forced to negotiate compromise in their menus. The Red Team struggled with their dessert, and Callum was chastised by the judges for his poor handling of the situation. But in the end, the Red Team emerged clear winners, forcing the Blue Team into an Elimination Challenge. Adam chose to use his immunity pin to escape the challenge, leaving Aaron, Jonathan and Marion to battle it out.	2,019,000	1st	1st (2,054,000)
70/12-5	Thursday 8 July 2010	Elimination Challenge 11 – Marion, Jonathan and Aaron were required to name a variety of nuts to progress to the next round. Jonathan won the first round and was safe. Marion and Aaron progressed to the second round where they had to recreate a Thai satay sauce. Although both dishes impressed the judges, Aaron's had better flavour and presentation, and Marion's was thicker and considered to be "gluggy" by the judges. Marion was eliminated.	2,143,000	1st	1st (2,054,000)
71/12-6	Friday 9 July 2010	MasterClass 12	1,214,000	3rd	16th
Week 13 – Semi Finals Week
72/13-1	Sunday 11 July 2010	Invention Test 11 – "Seven Deadly Sins" theme. Contestants struggled to produce stand-out dishes from a simple Mystery Box, with the two women left in the competition emerging as the strongest performers. Claire was declared the winner and won two big advantages: the power to skip the Invention Test, which would only have a Bottom 3, and the chance to face off in the Celebrity Chef Challenge. The Invention Test was based around the "seven deadly sins," with each contestant creating a dish based on one of the sins. In the end, Courtney, Jimmy and Jonathan produced the three least impressive attempts at "Envy," "Sloth" and "Lust" respectively and were sent into the Pressure Test.	1,865,000	1st	3rd
73/13-2	Monday 12 July 2010	Pressure Test Elimination 10 – Guest chef Christine Manfield set the most technically difficult dish seen so far in a pressure test: spice roasted squab with a turnip cake, with a recipe including 55 ingredients. In a close elimination, Jonathan presented undercooked squab to the judges, and was eliminated.	2,003,000	1st	1st (2,108,000)
74/13-3	Tuesday 13 July 2010	Celebrity Chef Challenge 12 – Shaun Presland beat Claire (29–21)	1,927,000	1st	1st (2,108,000)
75/13-4	Wednesday 14 July 2010	Signature Dish Challenge – Contestants were tasked with creating a dish that represented themselves and their cooking philosophy. After planning overnight and shopping with a $250 budget, each contestant had two hours to cook their signature dishes on five plates for Matt Preston and four other guests: Alla Wolf-Tasker, Mark Best, Kylie Kwong and Jacques Reymond. Each contestant was determined to impress such an illustrious panel, and the intense pressure lead to some potentially fatal mistakes. Overall, the judges were very impressed with the calibre of the dishes put forward, but only four contestants would automatically win their spot in the final week and a reward at Marque restaurant. Claire received the highest score (44.5 out of a possible 50 points), with Courtney and Callum tied in 2nd (43 pts) and Adam in 4th (40 pts), leaving Aaron, Alvin and Jimmy as the Bottom 3, fighting for their spot in the Finals.	2,192,000	1st	1st (2,108,000)
76/13-5	Thursday 15 July 2010	Elimination Challenge 12 – Aaron, Alvin and Jimmy faced a Basic Skills Test in a two-round Elimination Challenge. The first round saw contestants identifying different types of fish, with the two lowest scoring contestants moving into the second round. Jimmy named the most fish correctly, leaving Aaron and Alvin to face off in the second round; to cook the perfect fish and chips. Though the judges commended both contestants for producing good dishes, Aaron's chips were soggy and this was enough to seal his elimination.	2,206,000	1st	1st (2,108,000)
77/13-6	Friday 16 July 2010	MasterClass 13	1,250,000	2nd	16th
Week 14 – Finals Week
78/14-1	Sunday 18 July 2010	Invention Test 12 – The six remaining chefs were told they would be aiming to impress not only the three judges but also Hiroyuki Sakai, who arrived in his famous Iron Chef French uniform holding his nashi pear as he typically did in Kitchen Stadium. (Early in his career, Sakai had worked in Perth before returning to Japan.) The first challenge of Finals Week was then revealed - an invention test with the contestants split into two teams and asked to invent three dishes with the core ingredient of crustaceans, with ten minutes to plan and 75 minutes to catch and cook their crustaceans. Sakai was invited to "do the honors" of beginning the challenge, and he borrowed Takeshi Kaga's famous exhortation of "Allez cuisine!" that had customarily begun each Iron Chef battle. Sakai mainly spoke through an interpreter, though Adam (visibly and admittedly starstruck, having been born in Japan and having watched Iron Chef) was able to converse using his "rusty" Japanese. As someone who had become world famous for producing high-quality original dishes under pressure in Kitchen Stadium, Sakai appreciated how swift and sure the remaining chefs were even though they were amateurs, and he remarked at tasting that it was odd being a judge instead of the chef being judged and knew how nervous it was to be in their shoes. The Blue Team was praised for Adam's brilliant Scotch Egg invention but underwhelmed with the rest of their menu. The Red Team's dishes were, on the whole, more impressive (Courtney's Chilli Mud Crab had Iron Chef Sakai literally wanting more) but were criticised for not being as inventive. In the end, the Red Team's knockout dishes pushed them over the line, and Alvin, Courtney and Jimmy won an advantage going into the Pressure Test Elimination: to view the dish all six would be cooking (an Adriano Zumbo creation), taste it and study the recipe overnight. Sakai's appearance also compelled Adam to later tell News.com.au through the Telegraph, "(Iron Chef)'s the first (show) that entertained rather than educated. You wouldn't have MasterChef without Iron Chef."	2,188,000	1st	2nd
79/14-2	Monday 19 July 2010	Finals Week Elimination 1 – The contestants had to recreate Adriano Zumbo's eight layered "V8" vanilla cake. They had four hours to replicate this monumental creation, which featured 14 different processes, in order to be judged by Gary, Matt and Adriano himself. Each contestant struggled to have their cake ready on time, with only Adam, Callum and Jimmy coming close to the correct presentation. The judges were impressed with how well Adam's cake was assembled and his presentation but found his ganache layer was missing. Alvin failed to cover his cake with the glaze, and the judges criticised his layering, saying it lacked definition and was overall too messy. Jimmy's cake was rough on the outside, but the judges praised his layering and overall flavour; Adriano was "very happy" with Jimmy's effort. Callum was commended for his presentation but the judges found it was "big and clumsy," lacking the neutral jelly and salty praline. Claire's cake was missing the tempered chocolate decorations, and did not have the full set of layers, however the judges were impressed with the perfect balance of the layers presented. Courtney produced an uneven cake, half of her gel and topping having slid off as she was plating up, but the judges found the other half of her cake perfectly layered. However, she was missing the chocolate decorations and the flavour in the cake was deemed underwhelming. The judges decided that Alvin, Callum and Courtney were the worst performers. Callum was spared because, despite his mix up with the layering, he got all the elements on the plate and presented the cake beautifully. Courtney was deemed safe and Alvin became the first finalist eliminated. Although he had the best attempt at the tempered chocolate, the poor presentation, and the fact that he missed two of the layers sealed his elimination. Jimmy was then declared the winner of the challenge as he produced a cake with all 8 layers and a great taste. As winner, he won the advantage to pick the contents of the Mystery Box for the next days challenge.	2,243,000	1st	1st (2,439,000)
80/14-3	Tuesday 20 July 2010	Finals Week Elimination 2 – Contestants competed in a Mystery Box Challenge created by Pressure Test winner, Jimmy, having 90 minutes to produce both a savoury and sweet course for Matt, Gary and special guest judge Shannon Bennett. Jimmy's choice of ingredients created many issues for the other contestants, and even for Jimmy himself. Jimmy's Tarka and Garlic Butter Dhals were criticised for being under-flavoured, and his Onion Rings were deemed not up to competition standard. His Muscat Ice cream, although tasting good, was criticised for its poor presentation. Callum's lentil curry was praised for its flavour but his Flatbread did not impress. His dessert, a Lemon and Ginger Brulee Tart was a standout dish for each judge; Shannon praising both presentation and taste. Courtney's Dhal was deemed the best of the day, but the accompaniment, a savoury Pakora, was undercooked and claggy. Courtney struggled with ideas for her dessert, only deciding partway through the challenge. She subsequently ran out of time in her plating up, failing to complete all the elements of her dessert. The judges were underwhelmed by her Crepes with Lemon and Ginger Curd, saying it needed another element to make it work. Adam's complex dishes: Oeufs Mollè with Soubise, Gorgonzola Gratin and Tuile, and Candied Tomatoes in Muscat Sauce with Ginger and Salt Granita, proved to be too complicated, and while the judges admired his ambition, he overdid it ending up with unbalanced flavours. Claire struggled with creating two dishes from what she described as a "Mystery Box from Hell", and ended up making two similar dishes. She was criticised for not providing any crunch in her main course, for poor presentation of her Gorgonzola Mousse, and for an unbalanced Muscat Sauce. However, the judges were impressed with her Layered Lemon Curd Parfait, both in presentation and taste. In the end, Shannon Bennett was pleased with each contestant's performance; all had elements that were impressive. Callum was the first to be deemed safe, with Shannon praising his work ethic. Adam was next declared safe, and praised for his technical skills, creativity and instinct. Jimmy was the next through but was chastised for failing to take full use of his advantage. Claire and Courtney were declared the Bottom 2. The judges urged Claire to be more confident about her food, and while there was a lack of balance in her main, the techniques she displayed in making the solid dessert and brilliant Mousse were enough to save her from elimination, leaving Courtney the second finalist to be eliminated. A great Dhal was not enough to make up for the unimpressive elements of her dishes. More importantly, Courtney failed to demonstrate the level of skills expected at this stage of the competition when compared with Claire according to the judges. Adam, Callum, Claire and Jimmy moved on to the next challenge.	2,397,000	1st	1st (2,439,000)
81/14-4	Wednesday 21 July 2010	Finals Week Elimination 3 – In the third elimination challenge of the week, contestants had to present the concept of their cookbook they would write if they were to win, and make 3 dishes from it. They had 2.5 hours to produce the dishes for Gary, George, Matt and special guest judge, Maggie Beer. Claire was the first to present her dishes and the concept of her book which she named 'From the Hearth,' full of gutsy, honest and timeless food. Maggie Beer loved the concept of her book, but thought her Scallops with Crispy Pork Belly and Apple would be better without the pork belly, commenting, "this is a city dish." While the judges loved the Roast Beef from Claire's main course, they were disappointed with the Red Wine Sauce, calling it "vegemite-y." George noted that he would be pretty disappointed if he got that recipe from her book. However, her dessert, an Orange Blossom Pannacotta, completely won the judges over. Callum named his cookbook 'A Cook's Roadmap,' focussing on cooking techniques rather than ingredients or course. His three dishes, Coconut Mussels, Roast Pork Belly with Scallops, and Chocolate Fondant with Orange and Date Ice Cream each attempted to address the techniques of curry paste, roasting and custard. While Matt thought the curry was unbalanced with too much fish sauce, his two other dishes were met with raptures. Jimmy named his cookbook 'Flavours from My Home', citing he wanted to share what he learnt from home and to use the book to encourage readers to not be afraid to use all kinds of spices. While his dishes looked good, he was criticised for overcooking his Crispy Skin Duck with Tamarind Glaze. His Prawn Curry sauce tasted soapy. But he impressed the judges with his Chai Latte Brulee in terms of flavour even though it was not set properly. Last to present, Adam named his cook book 'Two Asian Kitchens,' which would include traditional and modern dishes inspired by Asian cuisines. His Hainanese Lobster Rice was praised for being "rich and sophisticated and hasn't lost the soul of the dish." His Smoked Kingfish Chirashi Zushi was praised for its inventiveness, technique and flavour. However, the judges didn't like his dessert, Chinese Churros with Salted Duck Egg Custard, citing that it did not appeal to the Western palate. Ultimately, Adam and Callum were the first told that they had made the Final 3, leaving Claire and Jimmy in the Bottom 2. Taking into consideration the faults in both Claire's and Jimmy's dishes, Jimmy was eliminated.	2,467,000	1st	1st (2,439,000)
82/14-5	Thursday 22 July 2010	Finals Week Elimination 4 – In the last elimination challenge before the Finale, Adam, Callum and Claire were tasked with cooking a three-course dinner for the Governor-General, Her Excellency Quentin Bryce and 30 of her guests. Each contestant was in charge of one course and would be judged on the quality of their dishes and their kitchen performance. Claire had first pick and selected the main: a Roast Rack of Lamb with Mushrooms, Broad Beans and Polenta. Adam chose the entree: a Tartlet of two Trout, Roast Tomato and Watercress, leaving Callum with the dessert: Chocolate Fondant with Blood Orange Jelly, Tuile and Honey Anglais. Adam faced problems with smoking his trout, and preparing the amount of pastry needed for 35 people. And although careful in his preparation, a bone was found in one of the tarts, although the mistake was caught before serving time. The judges were impressed with the consistent presentation of each of the tarts, the fact he served them on time and his overall performance in the kitchen. However, his pastry was criticised for being slightly too thick. Claire struggled from the word go, realising quickly the dish she had chosen had a huge amount of prep work; indeed preparing the Lamb Cutlets took up most of her time. She was forced to enlist a few extra hands along the way to help with her preparation. In spite of this, her main was not ready on time, delivered 15 minutes late. The judges were overall impressed with the dish, but noted that little things detracted from it as a whole: mismatched chops, crusty polenta, a lack of stickiness to the shallots. She was criticised for her performance in the kitchen, not getting her dishes complete on time. Despite a slow start, Callum handled the pressure well, methodically working through the technical elements of his dessert. The crucial moment proved to be getting all 35 fondants to just the right consistency: set on the outside and oozing from the middle. The judges were impressed with the level of skill shown by Callum in the kitchen to produce all the elements on the plate, however they found that not all the fondants had the "goo factor." Adam was the first declared safe and through to the Grand Finale after a solid performance. In the end, although each had their criticisms, Claire's performance in the kitchen proved not as impressive as Callum's and she became the fourth finalist eliminated.	2,513,000	1st	1st (2,439,000)
83/14-6	Friday 23 July 2010	MasterClass Reunion – Prior to the masterclass, the Top 2 were given private Masterclasses with chefs at the markets and restaurant. Adam joined Peter Kuruvita at Flying Fish while Callum joined Justin North at Becasse Restaurant. In the final MasterClass, the Top 24 reunited at the Masterchef Kitchen and revealed what they had done since being eliminated from the competition. Gary and George recreated their favourite dishes from the competition with the contestants, which included Alvin's dish, "Drunken and Bruised" and Fiona's Lavender Cream and Chocolate Ganache Tart. The two judges also completed the Mystery Box Challenge, the contents of which were chosen by the Final 2.	1,880,000	1st	4th
Finale
84/15-1	Sunday 25 July 2010	Finale Night – The Finale consisted of three rounds. Points would be earned for each round, with the winner decided based on the final tally after the three rounds. Round 1 was a Basic Skills Test where contestants had to name ingredients and complete cooking challenges represented by six cloches. Under the first cloche were three different spices that had to be named: turmeric, fennel seeds and Sichuan pepper, which Adam and Callum identified correctly. The next cloche contained three different fruits: a kumquat, a starfruit and a guava. Adam correctly identified the first two while Callum could only identify the starfruit. The third cloche contained three different cheeses: bocconcini, Parmesan and gruyere. Adam identified all three correctly, but Callum incorrectly identified bocconcini as mozarella. Under the fourth cloche were three different fish: tuna, kingfish and eel, all of which were correctly identified by both contestants. Three different sauces were under the next cloche: tartare, hollandaise and romesco. Although Adam correctly identified all three, Callum only named the tartare sauce correctly. Under the following cloche were carrots, which contestants had to julienne, brunoise and turn to the judge's standards. Callum was awarded points for his julienne and brunoise, but Adam was only awarded for his julienne. Under the final cloche were eggs, which contestants needed to use to produce a satisfactory omelette. Adam was awarded a maximum of two points for his omelette but Callum was only awarded one, which meant at the end of Round 1, the scores were Adam 17 and Callum 13. Round 2 of the final was an Invention Test, the theme of which was "3-ways", this meant contestants had to create an Assiette of a protein of their choosing, in which they could demonstrate three different techniques for cooking the protein. Adam chose pork belly, while Callum chose chicken. Accompanying Gary, George and Matt on the judging panel for this round was Matt Moran. Following the tasting, all the judges gave both Adam and Callum's dishes 9 out of 10 which meant at the end of Round 2, Adam was still in the lead with 53 points while Callum had 49. The Final Round was a Pressure Test where the Final 2 had to recreate Peter Gilmore's signature "Snow Egg". Although at the beginning of the Pressure Test, Callum was multiple steps ahead of Adam, he found problems with his batch of meringue which meant he had to redo them. As his granita had been in the freezer for too long, it was too hard and while he was trying to scrape it, parts of the granita fell to the ground, which resulted in his dishes not having as much granita as he had intended them to have. Adam also found difficulties with the dish, in particular whilst trying to mould the maltose disc on top of the meringue using a kitchen torch, he cracked a few. Ultimately, although Matt Moran awarded 9 out of 10 to Callum for his dish, the other judges awarded him only 8. In contrast, all judges awarded Adam 9 out of 10.	3,542,000 (Metro) 4,630,000 (Australia Wide)	2nd	2nd
84/15-1	Sunday 25 July 2010	Winner Announced – Adam was announced as the winner, beating Callum on overall points (89 to 82).	3,962,000 (Metro) 5,743,000 (Australia Wide)	1st	1st

Preceded by Celebrity MasterChef Australia	MasterChef Australia series 19 April 2010 – 25 July 2010	Succeeded by Junior MasterChef Australia (series 1)
