= TLC (Latin American TV channel) =

Programming
- Picture format: 1080i HDTV (downscaled to 480i/576i for the SD feed)

Ownership
- Owner: Skydance Latin America and Carriban
- Sister channels: Discovery Home & Health; Discovery Kids; Discovery Science; Discovery Turbo; Investigation Discovery

History
- Launched: 2000; 26 years ago (as Discovery Travel & Adventure Channel); 1 February 2005; 21 years ago (as Discovery Travel & Living); 1 November 2011; 15 years ago (as TLC: Travel & Living Channel); 2012; 14 years ago (as TLC)
- Former names: Discovery Travel & Adventure Channel (2000-2005); Discovery Travel & Living (2005-2011); TLC: Travel & Living Channel (2011-2012)

TLC is a television channel broadcasting to several countries in Latin America. It was originally known as Discovery Travel & Adventure Channel and featured more adventure-related programs. On February 1, 2005, the channel changed its name to Discovery Travel & Living and changed to lifestyle programming about travel, food, design, architecture and luxury. On November 1, 2011, it was relaunched as "TLC: Travel & Living Channel" as part of the international roll-out of the American counterpart, brand and the premiere of additional programming. In late 2012, "Travel & Living Channel" was dropped from the channel's name and replaced with the Discovery logo on the channel's logo.

== Operating channels ==
- TLC Latin America (Spanish Audio, with English SAP in some areas)
- TLC Brazil (dedicated feed for Brazil, with Portuguese audio or subtitles and local advertisements, adjusted for the local time zone, but with basically the same programming as its Spanish-language counterpart)
- TLC HD (instead of being a full simulcast of TLC, the all-HD channel features programming from TLC and Discovery Home & Health, with a single feed to the entire region, with separate audio and subtitle channels in Spanish and Portuguese. However, on March 16, 2015, the Brazilian version of TLC HD merged in full simulcast with TLC Brazil and the former TLC HD was replaced by a new all-HD channel called Discovery World HD, which maintained the same programming of the old channel)

== Programming ==
Programs broadcast on the channel include:

- Anthony Bourdain: Sin Reservas
- Comidas Exoticas con Andrew Zimmern
- Top 5: Latino America (Original Latin American Production)
- Mas que una fiesta (Original Latin American Production)
- Los Coctel Boys
- Kylie Kwong: Pura Magia
- Asia: sabor y Cultura
- Destino: Luna de miel
- Sobreviví un Desafio Japonés
- Trotamundos
- Ciudades y Copas (Original Latin American Production)
- La vuelta al mundo en 80 sabores (Original Latin American Production)
- 1000 lugares que ver antes de morir
- Cake Boss
- Cupcake Wars
- Hell's Kitchen U.S.
- MasterChef Australia
- MasterChef Peru
- Junior MasterChef Australia
- Miami Ink
- LA Ink
- NY Ink
- Sarah Palin's Alaska
- Earthtripping
- Mitos Culinarios
- Kitchen Boss
- Chef al rescate
- Maestros Cerveceros
- Getaway
- ROAM
- A la deriva con Cash Peters
- Dynamo: Magician Impossible
- Kitchen Boss
- Chopped
- My Big Fat American Gypsy Wedding
- The Great Food Truck Race
- Here Comes Honey Boo Boo

== See also ==
- TLC (TV network)
- Discovery Travel & Living
