= Sarah Hopkins (writer) =

Australian novelist

Sarah Hopkins (born 1969) is an Australian judge, criminal lawyer and novelist. She is a judge in the district court of New South Wales. She was previously a lawyer with the Aboriginal Legal Service in Sydney and chairperson of Just Reinvest NSW, a not for profit organisation that works to reduce the overrepresentation of Aboriginal and Torres Strait Islanders in the prison system.

As a novelist, her best-known book is The Crimes of Billy Fish. It was Highly Commended in the ABC Fiction Award and shortlisted for the Commonwealth Writers' Prize in 2008. Her second novel Speak to Me was released in May 2010.

Her third novel, This Picture of You, was published by Allen & Unwin in 2014 and shortlisted for the Barbara Jefferis Award for fiction.

She is married to chef Matt Moran and they have two children.

Sarah is the grand daughter of Harry Hopkins, who was Franklin Delano Roosevelt’s Secretary of Commerce and closest advisor on foreign policy during World War II.

== Works ==
- The Crimes of Billy Fish, ABC Books, 2007
- Speak to Me, Viking, 2010
- This Picture of You, Allen & Unwin, 2014
- The Subjects, Text Publishing, 2019
