= Junior MasterChef Australia series 3 =

Junior MasterChef Australia
- Series 3
- Judges: Andy Allen; Melissa Leong; Jock Zonfrillo
- No. of contestants: 14
- Winner: Georgia
- Runners-up: Carter, Filo
- Location: Melbourne Showgrounds, Ascot Vale, Victoria
- No. of episodes: 13

Release
- Original network: Network 10
- Original release: 11 October – 9 November 2020

Series chronology
- ← Previous; Series 2

The third series of Junior MasterChef Australia, the second spin-off of the Australian reality television series MasterChef Australia, premiered on 11 October 2020 after a nine-year hiatus. The judging panel consists of Andy Allen, Melissa Leong and Jock Zonfrillo. The winner would receive $25,000.

== Production ==
On 27 April 2020, it was announced that a third season of Junior MasterChef Australia had been commissioned, nine years after the second series aired. Casting was open to children aged between nine and fourteen.

Andy Allen, Melissa Leong and Jock Zonfrillo undertook the role of judges in the new series. The series was filmed at the Melbourne Showgrounds in Flemington.

Due to COVID-19 pandemic in Australia, the same health rules applied as in the Back to Win season. This included social distancing and having individual tasting plates for each judge.

== Top 14 ==
The Top 14 contestants were announced on 29 September 2020. One of the contestants was Ryan Cheliah, the son of MasterChef series 10 winner Sashi Cheliah.

Contestant	Age	State	Status
Georgia	11	VIC	Winner 9 November
Carter	11	NSW	Runners-up 9 November
Filo	12	VIC	Runners-up 9 November
Dev	13	NSW	Eliminated 8 November
Laura	13	QLD	Eliminated 8 November
Tiffany	14	QLD	Eliminated 3 November
Vienna	13	VIC	Eliminated 3 November
Ben	10	VIC	Eliminated 1 November
Ruby	11	WA	Eliminated 1 November
Phenix	11	NSW	Eliminated 20 October
Salvo	13	WA	Eliminated 20 October
Etka	13	VIC	Eliminated 13 October
Porsha	11	QLD	Eliminated 13 October
Ryan	11	SA	Eliminated 13 October

== Guest Chefs ==
Week	Guests	Challenge
2	Morgan Hipworth	Elimination Challenge
3	Emelia Jackson	Mystery Box
3	Xu	Immunity Challenge
3	Darren Purchese	Elimination Challenge
4 (Finals Week)	Curtis Stone	Mystery Box
4 (Finals Week)	Kirsten Tibballs	Semi-Finals Pressure Test

== Elimination Table ==
No.	Week	1			2		3		Finals			
No.	Immunity Challenge	Dev; Laura (Immunity Gong)	Carter; Georgia		Filo; Laura; Ruby; Vienna		Ben; Dev; Georgia; Laura; Vienna		Dev; Georgia (Advanced to Semi-Final)			
1	Georgia	IN	WIN	IMM	IN	Btm 9	Top 3	Btm 3	WIN	IMM	Top 3	Winner
2	Carter	IN	WIN	IMM	IN	Btm 9	IN	Btm 7	IN	Btm 5	Top 3	Runners-Up
2	Filo	IN	IN	Btm 12	Top 4	Btm 6	IN	Btm 4	IN	Btm 5	Top 3	Runners-Up
4	Dev	Top 2	IN	Btm 12	IN	Btm 6/Imm.	WIN	IMM	WIN	IMM	Elim	Eliminated (ep 12)
4	Laura	Top 2	IN	Btm 7/Imm.	WIN	IMM	Top 5	Btm 7	IN	Btm 5	Elim	Eliminated (ep 12)
6	Tiffany	IN	IN	Btm 7	IN	Btm 6	IN	Btm 7	IN	Elim	Eliminated (ep 11)	
6	Vienna	IN	IN	Btm 12	Top 4	Btm 9	WIN	IMM	IN	Elim	Eliminated (ep 11)	
8	Ben	IN	IN	Btm 7	IN	Btm 6	Top 5	Elim	Eliminated (ep 9)			
8	Ruby	IN	IN	Btm 12	WIN	IMM	IN	Elim	Eliminated (ep 9)			
10	Phenix	IN	IN	Btm 12	IN	Elim	Eliminated (ep 6)					
10	Salvo	IN	IN	Btm 7	IN	Elim	Eliminated (ep 6)					
12	Etka	IN	IN	Elim	Eliminated (ep 3)							
12	Porsha	IN	IN	Elim	Eliminated (ep 3)							
12	Ryan	IN	IN	Elim	Eliminated (ep 3)							
	Eliminated		Etka Porsha Ryan		Phenix Salvo		Ben Ruby		Tiffany Vienna		Dev Laura	Carter Filo
	Eliminated		Etka Porsha Ryan		Phenix Salvo		Ben Ruby		Tiffany Vienna		Dev Laura	Georgia

== Ratings and episodes ==
Ep#/Wk-Ep#	Original airdate	Episode Title	Total viewers (five metro cities)	Nightly Ranking	Ref.
Week 1
1/01-1	Sunday, 11 October 2020	Series Premiere: Signature Dish — The fourteen contestants were given 75 minutes to cook their signature dish. The contestants who cooked the top two dishes won the opportunity to bang the "immunity gong" once each, in order to save themselves from an elimination challenge at any time during that challenge. The judges were impressed by the quality of the cooking shown by the juniors, but they were especially excited by Dev's lamb Mughlai curry and Indian chicken kebab, and Laura's winter granita. Accordingly, Laura and Dev receive the privilege to bang the gong in an elimination challenge.	524,000	8	
2/01-2	Monday, 12 October 2020	Immunity Challenge: Honey — The contestants were shown how to extract honey from a Flow Hive. The contestants were then tasked to create a dish centred on honey. All of the contestants received positive feedback on the taste of their dish, but Georgia and Carter managed to produce the best dish, winning them the first Weekly Immunity of the season. The others are sent to the weekly Elimination Challenge.	546,000	13	
3/01-3	Tuesday, 13 October 2020	Elimination Challenge: Blindfold Taste Test — All the contestants, other than Carter and Georgia, were faced with the Jar Taste Test, where they were blindfolded and tasked with identifying a variety of ingredients inside jars. Etka mistook marshmallow for Turkish delight, Ryan mistook golden syrup for honey, Laura mistook avocado for parsnip, Salvo mistook pineapple for green melon, Ben mistook scrambled egg for halloumi, Porsha mistook sweet chili sauce for balsamic dressing, and Tiffany mistook oyster for prawn. Since they had all guessed incorrectly, they were sent into the second round where they were tasked to cook a dish which could be eaten with either a spoon, a chopstick, or a hand. Laura decided to bang the gong to save herself from the elimination challenge. Tiffany delivered the dish of the day by cooking a Hungarian feast, with Ben and Salvo also receiving praise for their dishes. Etka, Porsha, and Ryan had errors with their dishes, with Etka overcooking the filling for his samsa, Porsha cooking a dish without much technique, and Ryan under-seasoning his chicken, thus causing their elimination. However, despite their elimination, the judges announced that both of them would be getting a brand new mixer from Harvey Norman.	576,000	9	
Week 2
4/02-1	Sunday 18 October 2020	Old & Young Mystery Box — This week's Mystery Box showcased old and young ingredients, consisting of blue cheese, dates, aged balsamic, black garlic, dry-aged sirloin, red dwarf apples, baby basil, baby snapper, baby carrots and beetroots, baby potatoes, and baby cauliflower. Ruby produced a standout dish, with Laura, Vienna, and Filo also impressing the judges, and landing them in the immunity challenge. The rest were sent into the Weekly Elimination.	498,000	9	
5/02-2	Monday 19 October 2020	Immunity Challenge: Keeping Up with Andy — Filo, Laura, Ruby, and Vienna had to follow Andy and replicate his chipotle scotch fillet tacos, burnt jalapeño and avocado cream, and roasted corn salsa. They were not given a recipe and had to plate the dish within 30 seconds of Andy. Most of the contestants struggled keeping up with Andy. Vienna didn't cut her corn as much as Andy, which caused it to be too acidic. Ruby put the coriander leaves with the stems into the avocado cream, which caused the cream to become more vibrant than Andy's. Although Ruby incorrectly inserted her coriander leaves into the cream, the judges praised her cream as more vibrant and more delicious than Andy's, giving her the first immunity spot. Laura managed to replicate the dish the closest to Andy, giving her the second immunity.	454,000	18	
6/02-3	Tuesday 20 October 2020	Elimination Challenge: Doughnuts Topping & Fillings — This week elimination challenge is set by Morgan Hipworth. The contestants are required to create a topping and filling for the doughnuts given by Morgan in 45 minutes, where the best three dishes will send their makers to safety. Carter, Georgia and Vienna managed to create the best three dishes, impressing the judges and Morgan with their take on unique flavour pairings. Ben, Dev, Filo, Phenix, Salvo, and Tiffany were sent into the second round where they were required to cook a dish that best represents their food dreams. Dev decided to bang the gong to save himself from the elimination challenge. Filo aced the challenge by cooking an Egyptian prawn feast, inspired by his heritage. Tiffany also impressed the judges with her inventive take on carnivore scotch eggs. Although Ben had several problems during the cook, the judges were impressed by his ability to balance sophisticated indigenous Australian ingredients. Phenix's dream was to follow in her family's footsteps and open a feel-good bakery, so she decided to cook her signature coffee cake with a walnut and pistachio crumble and hazelnut and dark chocolate ice cream. While the judges enjoyed the flavours of her dish, unfortunately the texture of the crumble let her down. While the judges applauded Salvo for showing them he can cook seafood as well as meat, his prawn and tuna burger didn't hit the mark. In the end, the judges felt Salvo and Phenix failed to meet the brief and they were eliminated.	470,000	14	
Week 3
7/03-1	Monday 26 October 2020	Emelia Jackson's Mystery Box — Emelia Jackson returned to set up a mystery box challenge where the contestants were told to create a dish based on the ingredients that Emelia used to create her Mystery Box-shaped cake. The ingredients are strawberries, dark chocolate, white chocolate, passionfruit, vanilla, lemon, and hazelnut. Laura took a risk on serving dark chocolate profiteroles to Emelia. The risk paid off when Emelia and the judges praised the profiteroles as perfect. Georgia's mistake on using cooking cream, which causes the cream to not thicken up, on her deconstructed lemon tart didn't really matter, due to the outstanding flavour and texture of the dish. The judges were also impressed by Vienna's White Chocolate Dome due to the thin white chocolate layer, airy mousse, and perfect passionfruit gel. Ben also managed to impress the judges by the flavour combination of the ice cream and the biscuit in his ice cream sandwich. But, the judges were especially impressed by the Chocolate Sphere Dev has made, with Melissa praising his dish as on par with Reynold's and Jess'. Altogether, five of them proceed to the immunity challenge.	447,000	19	
8/03-2	Tuesday 27 October 2020	Immunity Challenge: Mr. X And The Hand Pulled Noodles — Laura, Dev, Ben, Georgia and Vienna participated in an immunity challenge where the contestants were asked to make a noodle dish from Mr. Xu's hand-pulled noodles. Vienna chose the thinnest noodles, Laura chose the triangular noodles, Dev chose the thick noodles, Ben chose the thinner noodles and Georgia chose the wider noodles. Dev (with his dan dan noodles) and Vienna (with her take on a Vietnamese cha-ca) won immunity. The rest were sent to the weekly elimination, although Georgia did receive a special commendation for her Char Kway Teow.	474,000	14	
9/03-3	Sunday 1 November 2020	Elimination Challenge: Winter Wonderland — The contestants entered the kitchen to find it snowing. The first round is an ice cream taste test. Ben mistook apple for bubblegum, Ruby mistook cherry for raspberry, Filo mistook corn for honey and Georgia mistook black sesame for charcoal. The second round is a pressure test in which they need to recreate Darren Purchase's "Snow". Filo entered round two eager to impress. His focus was impressive, and the judges marvelled at his clean bench and precision. He nailed all four elements of Darren's dish and was safe. Georgia delivered both the flavour and texture of Darren's coconut cake and her white chocolate and mint cream, with both elements deemed the best out of the four aspiring cooks, so she was also declared safe, leaving Ben and Ruby eliminated.	528,000	8	
Week 4 (Finals Week)
10/04-1	Monday 2 November 2020	Curtis Stone's Immunity Mystery Box — In this mystery box challenge, the contestants were challenged to make a potato dish, with the top dishes guaranteeing their makers a spot in the semi-finals. Dev (with his Thai red potato curry with rice and Thai potato croquettes) and Georgia (with her Sri Lankan potato curry, coconut flatbread and dry curry) advanced to the semi-finals	486,000	15	
11/04-2	Tuesday 3 November 2020	Elimination Challenge: Fruit As Savoury Dish Or Vegetable As Sweet Dish — in this challenge the judges asked the contestants to hero a fruit or a vegetable, but the twist was that they had to incorporate a vegetable in a sweet dish, or a fruit in a savoury dish. All the contestants choose to highlight a vegetable in a sweet dish. Laura chose fennel, Carter chose beetroot, Vienna chose pumpkin, Tiffany chose zucchini and Filo chose carrot. Laura's fennel sorbet with blackberry was terrific and Filo's carrot desert was great as well. Carter also managed the cut with his beetroot desert, but Tiffany didn't highlight zucchini and Vienna's tart was raw and thus they were eliminated from the competition.	485,000	16	
12/04-3	Sunday 8 November 2020	Semi Final Pressure Test: Kirsten Tibballs — Laura, Dev, Georgia, Carter and Filo had to recreate Kirsten Tibballs' Lemon Meringue Tart in 2 hours and 15 minutes. Georgia's flawless dish, Carter's delicious dish and Filo's flavour-packed dish got them over the line. Laura's lemon cream was too thick and had textural problems while Dev's tart was raw. Thus, they were eliminated from the competition.	526,000	8	
Week 5 (Grand Finale Week)
13/05-1	Monday 9 November 2020	Grand Finale — The Grand Finalists were welcomed with an orchestra which set in place their challenge for the Grand Finale. They had to make a fancy main and a fancy dessert. Georgia's three curries (pork curry, cashew curry and eggplant curry) along with her three condiments put her in the top box after the mains were served. Though the flavours of her dessert "A Tropical Mess" were good, the textures weren't. Filo was praised for his prawn and spicy rice during the mains and his dessert was nothing short of extraordinary. Carter did average in both mains and desserts, with his panna cotta tasting bad and his cauliflower puree being grainy.	652,000	12	
13/05-1	Monday 9 November 2020	Winner Announced — After a long discussion, the judges decided that Georgia's dishes were superior and she was rewarded with A$25,000. Because Filo and Carter got so far in the competition, they were given A$5,000.	881,000	5	

Preceded by MasterChef Australia (series 12)	MasterChef Australia spin-off 11 October 2020 – 9 November 2020	Succeeded by MasterChef Australia (series 13)
