= Anna Gare =

Australian musician and TV personality

- Born: 10 March 1969 (age 57); Perth, Australia
- Occupations: Musician, author, cook and television personality
- Television: Consuming Passions; Chef's Christmas; The Best in Australia; Junior MasterChef Australia; Destination WA
- Spouse: Luc Longley (m. 2008)
- Children: 2
- Website: annagare.com.au

Anna Gare (born 10 March 1969) is an Australian musician, cook, television personality and author.

== Biography ==
Gare was born 10 March 1969 in Subiaco, Western Australia and grew up in Fremantle. She attended the Lance Holt School, where as a student she ran a canteen for students and staff.

I had a friend who was a year older than me and together every Wednesday we would set up the classroom downstairs as a restaurant. We would have a three-course meal for $1. It was chicken noodle soup, chicken and salad and jelly and ice-cream for dessert.

— Anna Gare

=== Musician ===
Gare started off her career as a musician when she was twelve when she formed an all-female band with her sister Sophie and two friends, Jodie Bell and Lucy Lemann, called the Jam Tarts. The band was managed by their mother, Kate Gare. For ten years the Jam Tarts were a successful touring and recording band within Australia and performed at international music festivals. They performed live on NBC's Today Show, at the 1987 Edinburgh Fringe Festival, and toured with Rik Mayall and Jonathan Richman. The Jam Tarts also played as part of a larger band in combination with the Nansing Quartet, a six piece band whose members included Lucky Oceans, Adam Gare, Sam Lemann, Peter "Biff" Vincent, Peter Bell and Neale Austin. In 1986 she featured in an Australian film Pursuit of Happiness, as a 15-year-old who sings in a rock band and opposes American nuclear submarines being harboured in Australian waters.

Whilst Gare was in the Jam Tarts, she supplemented her rock and roll lifestyle with cooking, where she worked in various restaurants around Australia.

In 1993 she had a small role in Stark, a British-Australian television miniseries.

In 2004, Gare was inducted into the Western Australian Music Industry's Hall of Fame, as she had previously been inducted to the Rock 'n' Roll of Renown in 1993.

=== Cooking and television ===
In 1991, after a decade in rock and roll, she decided it was time for a change.

At 25 I had two children and didn't feel like doing the rock and roll thing any more – even the thought of playing in a smoky pub (as they were in those days) was not on.

— Anna Gare

In 1999, Gare formed a small catering business, Deluxe Catering, which she operated until June 2007.

She went on to present her own cooking segment on the magazine chat show Perth at Five. The program was shot live and ran weeknights for four months. She also presented a documentary on Fremantle, some segments on Today Tonight, and cooking segments with Perth DIY show Nuts and Bolts. She featured in, and narrated, a five-part series, Chefs Christmas, for The LifeStyle Channel. The series involved various Australian chefs and cooks, who invited viewers into their homes to share their festive season entertaining "secrets".

In 2007, Gare co-starred with chefs Ben O'Donoghue and Darren Simpson in The Best in Australia on The LifeStyle Channel. The show was filmed in her parents' home, a converted church in North Fremantle. It was positively received and Gare shot a second series which premiered on The LifeStyle Channel in August 2010. Best in Australia was syndicated in the United States on the Vibrant TV Network.

Gare was nominated as "Favourite Female Personality" at the 6th Annual ASTRA Awards in 2008.

In late 2008, she was approached by the producers of Masterchef Australia and auditioned for the position of mentor, host or judge on the show. However, she pulled out of the audition process, deciding to spend more time with her family, because the show was being filmed in Sydney. She subsequently appeared as an additional judge on the first series of Junior MasterChef Australia, which premiered on 12 September 2010.

In 2013, Gare co-hosted an Australian reality television baking competition, The Great Australian Bake Off, with Shane Jacobson. In 2017, she began presenting a cooking segment in Destination WA, a Nine Network program.

== Personal ==
Anna is the daughter of Bob and Kate Gare, and is one of four children. Her father is an architect and her elder brother Tom is an artist. Her eldest brother Adam is a musician and member of The Nansing Quartet, and her sister, Sophie, is married to English comedian and author Ben Elton.

Gare married a fellow Perth musician and had two children. In 2008 she married former Australian and NBA player Luc Longley, who has two daughters from a prior marriage. Since 2015 the couple have lived in a property near the coastal Western Australian town of Denmark.

== Awards ==
=== West Australian Music Industry Awards ===
The West Australian Music Industry Awards are annual awards celebrating achievements for Western Australian music. They commenced in 1985.

Year	Nominee / work	Award	Result
1993	Anna Gare	Rock 'n' Roll of Renown	inductee

== Published works ==
- Eat In published 2013
- Delicious Every Day published 2016
