= Matt Moran =

Australian chef (born 1969)

Matt Moran AM
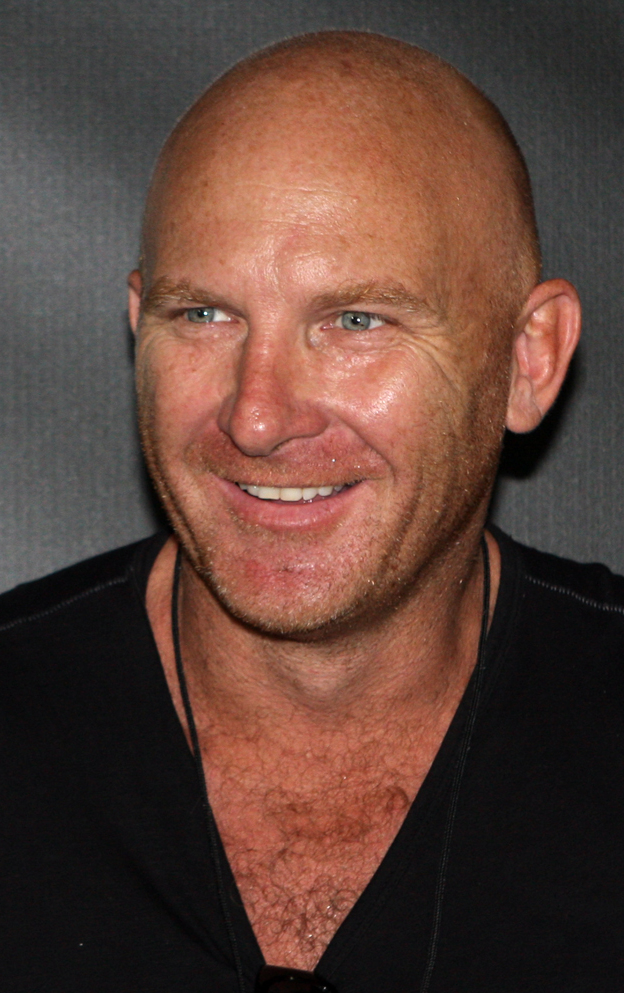
- Moran in 2012
- Born: 15 May 1969 (age 57); Tamworth, New South Wales, Australia
- Occupation: Chef
- Television: The Great Australian Bake Off
- Spouse: Sarah Hopkins
- Children: 2
- Website: www.mattmoran.com.au

Matthew Moran (born 15 May 1969) is an Australian chef and restaurateur also known for being a guest on various TV cooking shows.

== Early life ==
Moran was raised on a dairy farm at Badgerys Creek, west of Sydney, before moving to the outer-western suburb of Seven Hills. At age 15, Moran left Grantham High School to start a career as a chef. While still at school, he worked on weekends in the kitchen of the Parramatta RSL Club. He commenced his apprenticeship at La Belle Helene Restaurant, Roseville, on Sydney's North Shore, and it was here that Moran practiced the art of classical French cooking.

== Business ==
In 1991 Moran and business partner, Peter Sullivan, launched their first restaurant - The Paddington Inn Bistro. The successful partnership led them to open their second restaurant Moran's Restaurant and Café in 1995 which was also well received on the food scene. Moran's was awarded best new restaurant in the 1995 Sydney Morning Herald Good Food Guide.

Moran was also a member of the international culinary panel for Singapore Airlines. The role involves designing meals for passengers of Singapore Airlines.

In 2025, Moran lost the license to operate the bar at the Sydney Opera House to the restaurant company Applejack. The hospitality group Solotel had operated the bar in conjunction with Moran for 24 years.

== Television career ==
Moran is also well known as a celebrity chef on various TV cooking shows. The Chopping Block which began airing on the Nine Network on 6 February 2008. It was produced by Granada Productions and was hosted by Moran himself. It ran for two series of 8 episodes each. In 2011, Moran joined the 3rd season of MasterChef Australia as a judge.

Moran also featured in the television program Paddock to Plate, which began its second season on The Lifestyle Channel on Foxtel on 3 September 2014. In April 2015, Moran and Maggie Beer were announced as the judges of the second season of The Great Australian Bake Off, which began airing on LifeStyle Food on 13 October.

== Personal life and honours ==
Moran is married to Judge Sarah Hopkins of the New South Wales District Court and they have a son and daughter.

In June 2022, Moran was appointed Member of the Order of Australia in the 2022 Queen's Birthday Honours for "significant service to the tourism and hospitality industries, and to charitable organisations".
