= Jock Zonfrillo =

Scottish TV presenter and chef (1976–2023)

- Zonfrillo in 2017
- Born: Barry Zonfrillo; 4 August 1976; Glasgow, Scotland
- Died: 1 May 2023 (aged 46); Melbourne, Australia
- Occupations: Chef; philanthropist; television presenter
- Known for: MasterChef Australia judge
- Spouse: Lauren Fried (m. 2017)
- Children: 4
- Culinary career
- Cooking style: French; Italian; Scottish
- Rating
- Australian Good Food Guide
- Previous restaurants
- Turnberry, South Ayrshire, Scotland (1991); Arkle, Chester, England (1992–1993); Aubergine, London, England (1993–1994); The Restaurant Marco Pierre White, London (1994–1995); Chapter One, Kent, England (1995–1996); Restaurant 41, Sydney (1996–1997, 2000–2002); Les Saveurs, London (1997); The Pharmacy, London (1997); Hotel Tresanton Restaurant, Cornwall, England (1998–1999); Street ADL, Adelaide, South Australia (2013–2017); Orana, Adelaide (2013–2020); Bistro Blackwood, Adelaide (2017–2019); Nonna Mallozzi, Adelaide (2018–2019)
- Television shows
- Nomad Chef (2014); Restaurant Revolution (2015); Chef's Exchange (2016–2017); MasterChef Australia (2020–2023)
- Awards
- Young Scottish Chef of the Year; Basque Culinary World Prize; AGFG Restaurant of the Year

Barry "Jock" Zonfrillo (4 August 1976 – 1 May 2023) was a Scottish chef, television presenter and restaurateur. He was the founder of the Orana Foundation and a judge on MasterChef Australia.

== Early life ==
Zonfrillo was born in Glasgow, Scotland and raised in Ayr. His father, Ivan, was a barber and his mother, Sarah, was a hairdresser. His mother's family is Scottish from Dalmellington, Ayrshire, while his father is from Scauri, Italy. He had an older sister, Carla. Zonfrillo attended Belmont Academy in Ayr.

== Career ==
=== Rise to head chef ===
Zonfrillo started working in kitchens at the age of 12 as a part-time dishwasher at the restaurant in which his older sister was waitressing. He started learning to cook at the restaurant three weeks later when one of the chefs had a motorbike accident. Zonfrillo left school at age 15 and started an apprenticeship in the kitchens of The Turnberry Hotel. He stated that he started taking drugs, including heroin at this time. In 1993, at the age of 16, Zonfrillo was named Young Scottish Chef of the Year.

After completing his apprenticeship, Zonfrillo got a job at the one-Michelin-starred Arkle Restaurant in Chester. While working at Arkle, he claimed that he started selling drugs to fund his heroin addiction. Zonfrillo was fired from the restaurant after a foul-mouthed outburst that was overheard in the dining room.

Zonfrillo next travelled to London where he worked for Marco Pierre White at The Restaurant Marco Pierre White. He also worked at Quaglino's and at Chapter One with David Cavalier before heading to Australia in 1994 for 12 months. As a traveller, he was rejected by many of the restaurants he wanted to work at until he was hired by Dietmar Sawyere at Restaurant 41 in Sydney. Starting out as a line cook, Zonfrillo rose to become sous-chef after two months.

When his visa expired, Zonfrillo returned to London and worked for three months at Gordon Ramsay's Aubergine. He subsequently resumed working for White at the Oak Room and Les Saveurs, before joining Pharmacy. Zonfrillo was appointed to his first head chef position, at age 22, at The Tresanton Hotel in Cornwall.

=== Move to Australia ===
Zonfrillo immigrated to Australia in 2000. He stated that he quit heroin cold turkey upon arrival in Sydney, and remained clean since then. He became head chef of Restaurant 41 where he began using Australian native ingredients in his cooking. In 2002, Zonfrillo set fire to the pants of an apprentice chef for working too slowly. The chef, Martin Krammer, sued Zonfrillo after suffering burns to his hand and was awarded damages in excess of $75,000 in 2007. In May 2007, Zonfrillo was declared bankrupt after a creditor's petition from Krammer was successful in the Federal Magistrates Court. According to Krammer, "He [Zonfrillo] never paid me a cent."

Zonfrillo was fired from Restaurant 41 after the incident. He started importing and selling kitchen equipment and doing some consultancy, then briefly worked at the Austral after moving to Adelaide. In 2011, Zonfrillo was named head chef at Penfolds Magill Estate Restaurant in South Australia but left after 18 months.

=== Restaurants ===
In November 2013, he opened Orana and Street ADL in Adelaide replacing Street ADL with Bistro Blackwood in September 2017. In August 2017, Orana was named Australia's 2018 Restaurant of the Year by Gourmet Traveller magazine; the same year Zonfrillo was named Australia's 2018 Hottest Chef in The Australian. In October 2018, Orana was named Australia's 2019 Restaurant of the Year by The Good Food Guide, as well as being a three hatted restaurant in the 2019 and 2020 Chef Hat Awards.

In 2016 and 2017, Zonfrillo ran a fixed food truck called Nonna Mallozzi, serving Italian food. Zonfrillo opened a bar called Mallozzi in December 2018. He closed it in July 2019 after posting losses exceeding $140,000 in the time it was open. In late 2019, Bistro Blackwood closed, followed by Orana in March 2020. On 5 October 2020, the companies which operated the restaurants entered into voluntary administration, with substantial unpaid debts, amounting to approximately $3.2 million. A preliminary report filed by the administrators with ASIC in October 2020, recorded that initial investigations were being undertaken into whether the restaurant companies were trading while insolvent, if there had been unfair preferences or potential breaches of director duties, and concerning related party loans. Zonfrillo also had to sell his family home in the Adelaide Hills after the closure of Orana.

=== The Orana Foundation ===
In 2016, Zonfrillo started The Orana Foundation, to preserve historical cooking techniques and ingredients of Indigenous Australians. The foundation was awarded The Good Food Guide Food for Good Award in October 2017. One of the foundation's projects was a database of 1,443 Aboriginal food plants created in partnership with the University of Adelaide. Launched in September 2020, the database provided information about the plants' nutritional profile, taste, flavour, and optimal methods of preparation and cooking.

Questions were raised by The Australian in August 2020 regarding Zonfrillo's management of the foundation. Zonfrillo launched defamation proceedings in the Federal Court of Australia against the newspaper. The Australian's publisher Nationwide News settled the court case. An apology was printed in The Australian newspaper on 17 December 2020 and published on their website.

=== Television ===
In 2014, Zonfrillo hosted the Discovery Channel show Nomad Chef which saw him travel to communities in 10 countries to learn how they gather ingredients and cook. In 2015, he hosted the cooking reality television series Restaurant Revolution. In 2016, Zonfrillo co-hosted Chef Exchange with chef Qu Jianmin from Adelaide's sister city Qingdao. Running for two seasons, the show focused on the two chefs exploring each other's food and wine cultures.

In October 2019, Zonfrillo was announced as one of the new judges for MasterChef Australia, alongside Melissa Leong and Andy Allen. He had previously appeared as a guest chef on the show across three seasons.

In July 2020, Zonfrillo was announced as one of the judges for Junior MasterChef Australia in 2020.

=== Other work ===
Zonfrillo was programming director of the Tasting Australia food festival from 2016 to 2019.

In July 2021, Zonfrillo began selling "worry beads" bracelets with skulls on them for up to $500 each, under the brand Caim.

=== Memoir ===
On 28 July 2021, Simon & Schuster published Zonfrillo's memoir, Last Shot. A subsequent feature in The Sydney Morning Herald questioned his stories, notably his claims of having visited "hundreds of Indigenous communities", as well as stories of his drug use. Marco Pierre White, referred to as a father figure in the book, stated that "almost everything he has written about me is untrue". Simon & Schuster replied that the book was "a historical account written from the personal knowledge of the subject writing it."

== Personal life ==
Zonfrillo met his first wife, Kelly, in Sydney in 1996. They separated in 2002.

On 1 January 2017, Zonfrillo married his third wife, Lauren Fried. The couple met on Twitter in October 2014. In February 2018, Fried and Zonfrillo had a son who was born two months premature and weighed only 1.2 kg. Fried and Zonfrillo had a daughter in October 2020. Zonfrillo had two other daughters from his two previous marriages.

After the closure of his restaurants, Zonfrillo and his family relocated to Melbourne around March 2020. Prior to his death, the family resided in Carlton and moved to Rome, Italy in 2023.

Daily Mail Australia reported that he had been battling bowel cancer since 2021, and that when he was not filming MasterChef, he was receiving treatment for the disease.

== Death ==
Zonfrillo died in Melbourne, Australia, on 1 May 2023, at age 46. His body was found after police were called to conduct a welfare check at Zagame's House hotel. There was no immediate confirmation of his cause of death, but the police were not treating the death as suspicious and were preparing a report for the coroner. The 15th season of MasterChef Australia, which Zonfrillo had already filmed, was scheduled to premiere on 1 May 2023 but was postponed to 7 May. It was preceded by a special episode of The Sunday Project reflecting on Zonfrillo's life. His funeral was held at the Macquarie Park Cemetery and Crematorium on 13 May 2023 and attended by around 200 people.

== Recognitions ==
- 1993 Young Scottish Chef of the Year – The Federation of Chefs Scotland
- 2014 South Australian Best New Restaurant and South Australian Restaurant of the Year – The Advertiser Food Awards
- 2015 South Australian Restaurant of the Year – The Advertiser Food Awards
- 2015 Chef of The Year – Restaurant & Catering Awards
- 2015 and 2016 Australia's Hot 50 Restaurants – The Australian
- 2017 Hottest Chef & Hottest South Australian Restaurant – The Australian
- 2017 Food for Good Award – The Good Food Guide
- 2018 Australian Restaurant of the Year – Gourmet Traveller magazine
- 2018 Australia's Hottest Chef – The Australian
- 2018 Australian Food for Good Award – The Good Food Guide
- 2018 Basque Culinary World Prize – Basque Culinary Center
- 2019 Australian Restaurant of the Year – The Good Food Guide.

== Filmography ==
Television
Year	Title	Role	Notes
2014	MasterChef Australia	Guest chef	Series 6
2014	Nomad Chef	Host	Filmed in 10 countries and aired in 220 countries.
2015	Restaurant Revolution	Host	For Seven Network in Australia.
2016–2018	Chef Exchange	Host	First and second season for Qingdao TV (QTV) in China and South Australia.
2018	MasterChef Australia	Guest chef	Series 10
2019	MasterChef Australia	Guest chef	Series 11
2020–2023	MasterChef Australia	Judge	Series 12–15, Series 15 aired posthumously
2020	Junior MasterChef Australia	Judge	Series 3
