= Tasting Australia =

Festival in Adelaide, South Australia

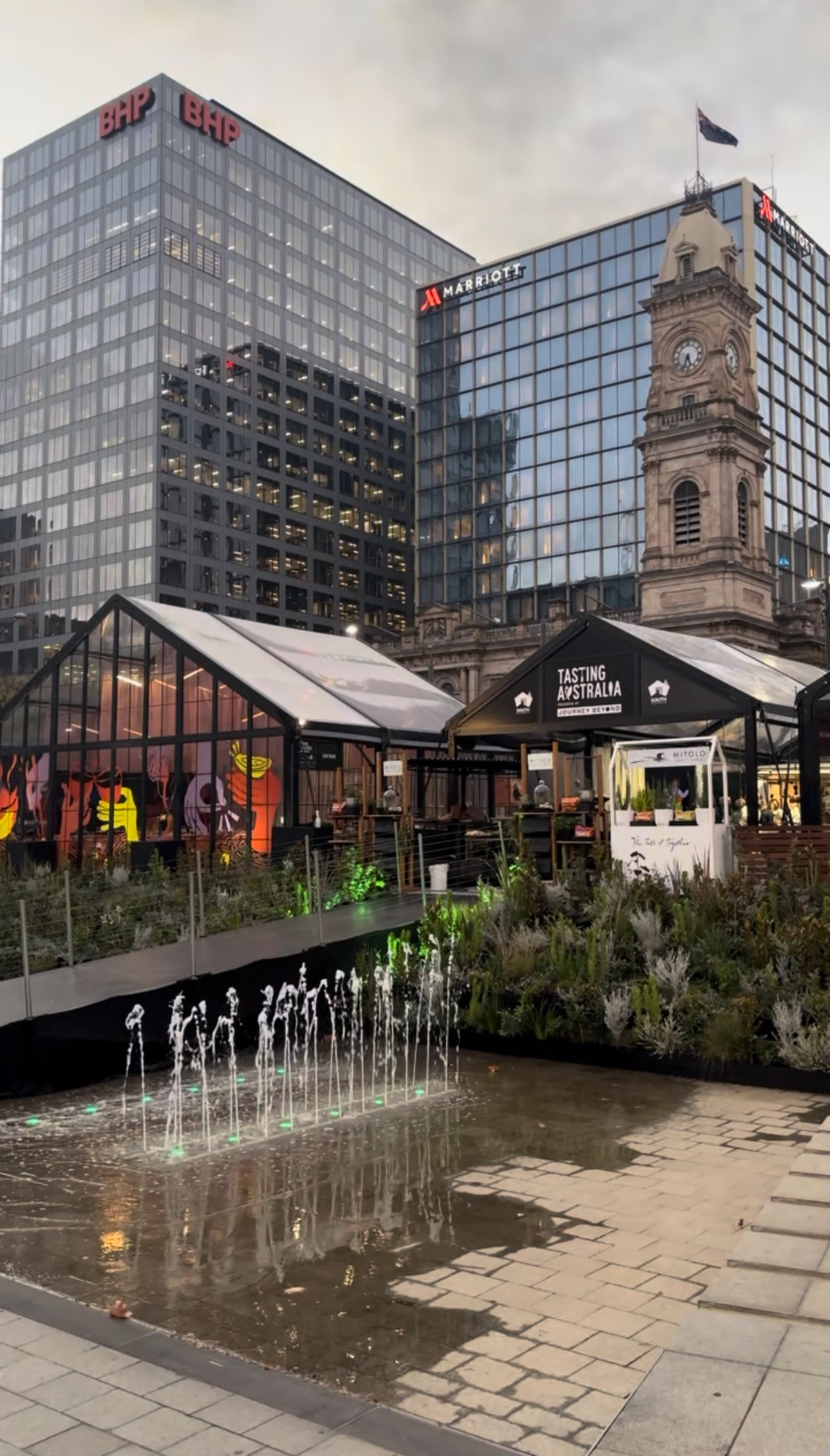
Tasting Australia festival hub Town Square, located in Victoria Square/Tarntanyangga.

Tasting Australia presented by Journey Beyond is a South Australian food and beverage festival held in the capital city of Adelaide. First held in 1997 and managed by Marina Libia and event management company Consuming Passions, the festival has grown to become one of Australia's premier culinary events and is now managed by the South Australian Tourism Commission. The next edition of the festival will be held from 8-17 May 2026.

== History ==
The 2014 event hosted over 80 ticketed and free events throughout South Australia. The festival was held biennially for 15 years and became annual from the 2016, which was held from Sunday 1 May to Sunday 8 May 2016.

By the mid-2010s, Tasting Australia had become an internationally recognized event, drawing attention from global media and food critics. The festival's focus shifted to emphasize sustainability, local sourcing, and innovative dining experiences, solidifying its role as one of Australia's leading food and wine festivals.

Due to government prohibitions on large crowds because of the COVID-19 pandemic in Australia, in 2020 the event was postponed to October/November, then cancelled.

As of 2025, the festival includes more than 150 events across South Australia, featuring in all 12 regions of the state. Many of these events are situated in the Tasting Australia 'Town Square' located at Victoria Square/Tarntanyangga.

== Creative Directors ==
Duncan Welgemoed

South African-born chef Duncan Welgemoed joined the Tasting Australia creative team in 2025. Trained in London's Michelin-starred kitchens before relocating to Adelaide, where he opened Africola in 2014. Known for bold, wood-fired cooking and vibrant design, Duncan curates the upcoming festival and featured in Tasting Australia by Train. His book Cooking with Fire launched in 2024.

Kane Pollard

Kane Pollard is the current Food Curator for Tasting Australia. Growing up in an Adelaide Hills market gardening family, Pollard's passion for sustainability and local produce shaped his culinary journey. He is known for his creative cooking style, passion for unique produce and sustainability.

Banjo Harris Plane

Banjo Harris Plane, a prominent figure in the drinks industry, has been a part of the Tasting Australia creative team since 2022. Harris Plane is a renowned wine professional from Adelaide, with experience in fine dining, wine imports, and sales. His stint as manager of Attica in Melbourne saw him twice named Australia's best sommelier.

Meira Harel

Meira Harel joined Tasting Australia as a drink's curator in late 2022. Harel is a wine and restaurant professional with extensive experience managing top Australian venues. Originally from Israel, she moved to Melbourne in 2012, earning recognition as a sommelier and manager. Harel was named Victorian Sommelier of the Year by The Age Good Food Guide in 2016 and is now the Drinks Curator for Tasting Australia.

Jessica Ducrou

Co-founder of Secret Sounds and driving force behind Splendour in the Grass and Falls Festival, Ducrou joined the Tasting Australia's creative team in 2025, bringing bold programming and deep festival expertise to the lineup.

=== Notable Past Creative Directors ===
Simon Bryant

Simon Bryant is one of two Creative Directors for Tasting Australia. Bryant worked with the Hilton Adelaide for more than ten years, culminating in becoming executive chef. He has worked alongside South Australian cook Maggie Beer, co-hosting more than 150 episodes of The Cook and the Chef on the ABC.

Paul Henry

Paul Henry is a wine writer and marketer, and one of two Creative Directors of Tasting Australia. Henry established Winehero Australia in January 2011, a company specialising in strategic planning, brand development and communication, where he acts as a director.

Maggie Beer

Maggie Beer has been a Patron for Tasting Australia. Beer has appeared as a guest judge on MasterChef Australia and runs Maggie Beer's Farm Shop in the Barossa Valley with a range of products sold throughout Australia and overseas. Beer was awarded the Centenary Medal in 2001 for service to Australian society through cooking and writing, and was named Senior Australian of the Year in 2010. In the Australia Day Honours of 2012, Beer was appointed a Member of the Order of Australia (AM) "for service to the tourism and hospitality industries as a cook, restaurateur and author, and to the promotion of Australian produce and cuisine."

Cheong Liew

Cheong Liew took over from foodie Maggie Beer as Patron of Tasting Australia. Liew moved from Malaysia to Australia in 1969. He received his first critical acclaim for his Adelaide based restaurant Neddy's. However, he is probably best known for his restaurant The Grange, which opened in the Adelaide Hilton Hotel in 1995 and closed in 2009.

Darren Robertson

Darren Robertson is a chef, owner of Three Blue Ducks in Bronte, at first, and now Three Blue Ducks on The Farm at Byron Bay. Robertson has previously been a visiting chef at Tasting Australia but joins for the first time as 'Food Curator' in 2021.

Karena Armstrong

Karena Armstrong was Tasting Australia Festival Director in 2024 and 2025. A chef and restaurateur she is known for her focus on sustainable food practices and supporting local producers. Under her leadership, Tasting Australia continued to expand its offerings while maintaining ties to South Australia's culinary heritage and regional food producers.
