= Dieuveil Malonga =

Chef from Congo-Brazzaville (b. 1991)

Dieuveil Malonga (born November 1991) is a chef and entrepreneur from Congo-Brazzaville. He specializes in Afro fusion cuisine, a culinary art he describes as, "a subtle blend of tradition and modernity".

A finalist of the Basque Culinary World Prize in 2018 and a Forbes 30 under 30 honoree, Malonga started his career at three different Michelin starred restaurants in Germany—Schote, Life, and Aqua. In 2016, he launched Chefs in Africa, a digital professional network.

Malonga has cooked for Cartier, fashion designers Rick Owens and Gareth Pugh, and American rappers ASAP Rocky and Yasiin Bey.

== Early life and career ==
Malonga was born in November 1991 in Linzolo, Republic of Congo, and was raised by his grandmother from the age of three. As a teenager, he moved to Warstein, Germany. He attended Adolph-Kolping-Berufskolleg school in Münster and graduated in 2012.

Malonga has described his early life as "an unlikely route made of encounters, sacrifice, brewing, exchange, and sharing opportunities."

While his gastronomy career started at three different Michelin starred restaurants in Germany—Schote, Life, and Aqua—he has said that his "ambition is to write a new story of gastronomy which has its roots in Africa".

== Chefs in Africa ==
Launched in 2016, Chefs in Africa is a social enterprise and professional network which trains and promotes culinary talents. Malonga said that the enterprise's "commitment is to support [members] with the building of their creative and business legacy." As of August 2018, the community has over 4,000 chefs.

== Honors ==
Malonga ranked sixth on Forbes Africa 30 Under 30 list in 2016.

Malonga was the honoree chef during UNESCO's Africa Week 2017 in Paris, France.

In June 2018, he was a panelist and speaker at the 4th UNWTO World Forum on Gastronomy Tourism—an initiative by the government of Thailand and the United Nations World Tourism Organization (UNWTO), in collaboration with the Basque Culinary Center.

Malonga was one of the 10 global finalists of the Basque Culinary World Prize 2018 for his "contribution to making positive changes to society through gastronomy with Chefs in Africa."

In September 2018, Quartz Africa included Malonga in their annual Africa Innovators list, an editorial series featuring 30 of Africa's leaders in technology, arts, business, science, agriculture, design, and media.
