= Adela Balderas =

Basque university professor (born 1969)

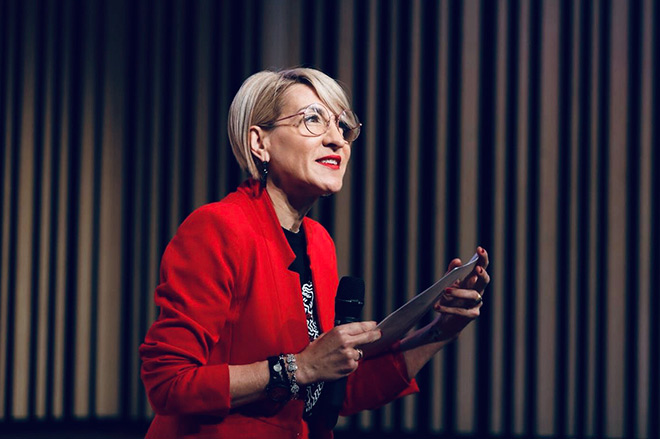
- Born: María Adela Balderas Cejudo; 1969 (age 56–57); Bilbao (Basque Country); Spain
- Occupations: university professor; consultant; conference speaker; author
- Relatives: Javier Balderas

Academic background
- Education: University of Salamanca (BA); University of Deusto (PhD); University of the Basque Country (MBA, MA)
- Thesis: Senior tourism: determinants, motivations and behaviour in a globalized and evolving market segment (2017)

Academic work
- Discipline: Business administration and management
- Sub-discipline: Management, marketing, coaching
- Institutions: University of Deusto; University of Mondragón; University of Oxford; Massachusetts Institute of Technology

María Adela Balderas Cejudo (born in Bilbao in 1969) is a Basque university professor, consultant, conference speaker and author.

She is currently a research fellow at the University of Oxford, affiliated professor at the Massachusetts Institute of Technology (MIT) and professor at Deusto Business School and at the Mondragon University.

She holds an international doctorate in business administration and management from the University of Deusto.

== Early life and education ==
Balderas was born in Bilbao (Basque Country), the youngest of three children.

In 1992, Balderas earned a licentiate degree in English Philology at the University of Salamanca. She later completed postgraduate degrees in business and marketing at the University of New York and the University of the Basque Country.

In 2017, she received an international doctorate in business administration and management from the University of Deusto in collaboration with the University of Oxford in 2017. She also got an MBA Executive and a master's degree in marketing from the University of the Basque Country and a master's in professional coaching from INESEM.

== Career ==
Balderas is associate professor at the Department of Management Humanism in Management and Economics (HUME) at the University of Deusto and at the Deusto Business School and associate professor at the Basque Culinary Center of the University of Mondragón. She is also a research fellow at the University of Oxford, in the Institute of Population Ageing.

Balderas is also a consultant and a conference speaker in universities such as Harvard University, Massachusetts Institute of Technology (MIT), University of Oxford, Cambridge University, University of Deusto, the George Washington University and others and also in international events such as the World Tourism Fair or the International Entrepreneurs Forum.

== Books ==
- Reinvent your Leadership: 12 keys to managing teams, ESIC Editorial, 2021.

== See also ==
- Basque Culinary Center
- Massachusetts Institute of Technology
