= The Hotplate =

Television series

- Genre: Reality
- Judges: Tom Parker Bowles; Scott Pickett; Guillaume Brahimi
- Opening theme: "Bills" by LunchMoney Lewis
- Country of origin: Australia
- Original language: English
- No. of series: 1
- No. of episodes: 18

Production
- Producer: Endemol Australia
- Running time: 60–90 minutes (including commercials)

Original release
- Network: Nine Network
- Release: 28 July – 2 September 2015

The Hotplate was an Australian cooking reality television series which aired on the Nine Network on 28 July 2015. The show consisted of state-based restaurants with teams travelling the country to dine in and score each other's restaurants. The restaurants were judged by British food writer and critic, Tom Parker Bowles and Melbourne restaurateur, Scott Pickett. The show pit six established suburban restaurants against each other all striving for a leg up in the industry—and an extra $100,000 in the bank, Sydney's Guillaume Brahimi, the French-born chef, appeared as a special guest judge during all elimination episodes.

Only one season of the program has been produced, following legal action from the Seven Network claiming the format is too similar to its own program My Kitchen Rules. Nine and Seven reached a settlement in which Nine agreed that no further seasons would be produced, and the inaugural season would never be replayed.

== Format ==
Local restaurant heroes from around the country will do battle over dinner, they will be judged on all aspects of the restaurant experience. The worst performing teams will face elimination. The winner of the competition will receive $100,000 prize and realise their food dream.

== Series overview ==
Title	Episodes	Originally aired		Result	
Title	Episodes	Series premiere	Series finale	Winning couple	Prize
The Hotplate	18	28 July 2015	2 September 2015	Marie & Emi	$100,000

Premiere date	Finale date	Winners	Runners-up	Other competing teams	
28 July 2015	2 September 2015	Marie Yokoyama & Emi Kamada (QLD)	Aron & Vanessa Filetti (NSW)		
28 July 2015	2 September 2015	Marie Yokoyama & Emi Kamada (QLD)	Aron & Vanessa Filetti (NSW)	3rd	Lozz Klavins & Nols de Lorenzo (VIC)
28 July 2015	2 September 2015	Marie Yokoyama & Emi Kamada (QLD)	Aron & Vanessa Filetti (NSW)	4th	Phillipe & Pascal Lebreux (NSW)
28 July 2015	2 September 2015	Marie Yokoyama & Emi Kamada (QLD)	Aron & Vanessa Filetti (NSW)	5th	Christina & Tania Harding (WA)
28 July 2015	2 September 2015	Marie Yokoyama & Emi Kamada (QLD)	Aron & Vanessa Filetti (NSW)	6th	Conrad Hector & Liam Jarman (WA)

== Elimination history ==
Teams' Competition Progress
Round:	Private Dinners	1st Elimination Dinner	Makeover Dinners	2nd Elimination Dinner	Public Dinners	Grand Finale
Team	Progress					
Marie & Emi	2nd (60)	Safe	2nd (64)	Safe	1st (79)	Winners (26)
Aron & Vanessa	1st (61)	Safe	1st (77)	Safe	2nd (71)	Runners-up (24)
Lozz & Nols	4th (52)	Safe	3rd (57)	Safe	3rd (68)	Eliminated (Episode 17)
Phillipe & Pascal	3rd (54)	Safe	5th (43)	Safe	4th (63)	Eliminated (Episode 17)
Christina & Tania	5th (48)	Safe	4th (46)	Lose	Eliminated (Episode 13)	
Conrad & Liam	6th (36)	Lose	Eliminated (Episode 7)			

Cell descriptions
The team was the highest scoring team during a challenge
The team was the lowest scoring team during a challenge
The team became safe during a challenge and advanced to the Makeover Round
The team became safe during a challenge and advanced to the Public Dinners
The team became safe during the final challenge and advanced to the Grand Finale
The team won an elimination challenge
The team lost an elimination challenge
The team was eliminated due to having the lowest score or losing an elimination dinner

== Teams ==
Team		Relationship	Restaurant Cuisine Style	Restaurant Name	Result
QLD	Marie Yokoyama & Emi Kamada	Best Friends	Japanese	Bird's Nest	Winners 2 September (Grand Finale)
NSW	Aron & Vanessa Filetti	Husband & Wife	Modern Australian	Rocksalt	Runners-up 2 September (Grand Finale)
VIC	Lozz Klavins & Nols de Lorenzo	Chef & Owner	Seafood	Wings & Fins	Eliminated 1 September (Public Dinner 4)
NSW	Phillipe & Pascal Lebreux	Father & Son	French	Chez Pascal	Eliminated 1 September (Public Dinner 4)
WA	Christina & Tania Harding	Mother & Daughter	Italian	Christina's	Eliminated 24 August (Elimination Dinner 2)
WA	Conrad Hector & Liam Jarman	Couple	Asian Fusion	Duck Duck Moose	Eliminated 10 August (Elimination Dinner 1)

== Series details ==
=== Private Dinners ===
Each team has 3 hours to prep their food they are cooking. The teams and judges decide what they want to eat from their menu. Two entrees, mains and desserts are chosen. The teams score the team out of 10 for a whole score out of 50, the judges score the food and restaurant experience (separately out of 10) for a score out of 20 (score of 40 together).

==== Christina & Tania - Italian ====
- Episode 1
- Airdate — 28 July 2015

Private Dinner Details and Scores
1st Private Dinner
Meal	Christina & Tania - Italian			
Entrées	Funghi Alla Griglia (Grilled Mushrooms)			
Entrées	Minestrone			
Mains	Bistecca Christina (Steak with Porcini Mushroom Sauce)			
Mains	Fettucine Con Pollo (Fettuccine with Chicken)			
Desserts	Sticky Date Pudding (With Butterscotch Sauce)			
Desserts	Apple Crumble			
Team Scores				Whole Total
Team	Score		Total	Whole Total
Lozz & Nols	5 / 10		23 / 50	48 / 90
Aron & Vanessa	4 / 10		23 / 50	48 / 90
Marie & Emi	6 / 10		23 / 50	48 / 90
Phillipe & Pascal	4 / 10		23 / 50	48 / 90
Conrad & Liam	4 / 10		23 / 50	48 / 90
Judges' Scores				48 / 90
Judge	Score		Total	48 / 90
Judge	Food	Experience	Total	48 / 90
Tom	5 / 10	8 / 10	25 / 40	48 / 90
Scott	5 / 10	7 / 10	25 / 40	48 / 90

==== Phillipe & Pascal - French ====
- Episode 2
- Airdate — 29 July 2015

Private Dinner Details and Scores
2nd Private Dinner
Meal	Phillipe & Pascal - French			
Entrées	Lamb Brains (in Garlic Butter)			
Entrées	Salmon Roulade (in Horseradish Sauce)			
Mains	Rack of Lamb (in Mint & Port Wine Sauce)			
Mains	Duck Breast (in Mandarin Liqueur Sauce)			
Desserts	Chocolate Pudding (in Crème Anglaise)			
Desserts	Crêpe Normande			
Team Scores				Whole Total
Team	Score		Total	Whole Total
Lozz & Nols	6 / 10		26 / 50	54 / 90
Aron & Vanessa	4 / 10		26 / 50	54 / 90
Marie & Emi	6 / 10		26 / 50	54 / 90
Christina & Tania	5 / 10		26 / 50	54 / 90
Conrad & Liam	5 / 10		26 / 50	54 / 90
Judges' Scores				54 / 90
Judge	Score		Total	54 / 90
Judge	Food	Experience	Total	54 / 90
Tom	7 / 10	6 / 10	28 / 40	54 / 90
Scott	7 / 10	8 / 10	28 / 40	54 / 90

==== Aron & Vanessa - Mod Aus ====
- Episode 3
- Airdate — 30 July 2015

Private Dinner Details and Scores
3rd Private Dinner
Meal	Aron & Vanessa - Modern Australian			
Entrées	Tiger Prawn Stack			
Entrées	Roasted Vegetable Tarte Tatin			
Mains	Barramundi (with Harisa Tomato & Roast Capsicum Salsa)			
Mains	Kangaroo Fillet (on Sweet Mash Potato with Beetroot Marmalade)			
Desserts	Pavlova			
Desserts	Banoffee Pie			
Team Scores				Whole Total
Team	Score		Total	Whole Total
Lozz & Nols	8 / 10		30 / 50	61 / 90
Phillipe & Pascal	6 / 10		30 / 50	61 / 90
Marie & Emi	7 / 10		30 / 50	61 / 90
Christina & Tania	3 / 10		30 / 50	61 / 90
Conrad & Liam	6 / 10		30 / 50	61 / 90
Judges' Scores				61 / 90
Judge	Score		Total	61 / 90
Judge	Food	Experience	Total	61 / 90
Tom	8 / 10	8 / 10	31 / 40	61 / 90
Scott	8 / 10	7 / 10	31 / 40	61 / 90

==== Conrad & Liam - Asian Fusion ====
- Episode 4
- Airdate — 3 August 2015

Private Dinner Details and Scores
4th Private Dinner
Meal	Conrad & Liam - Asian Fusion			
Entrées	Steamed Pork Buns (with cucumber, Lime Relish & Chilli Oil)			
Entrées	Wild Mushroom Wonton Cups (with Relish & XO Sauce)			
Mains	Tea Smoked Salmon (with Coconut Turmeric Risotto)			
Mains	Stuffed Squid (with Prawn, Chorizo, Mango & Nam Jim)			
Desserts	Five Spice Chocolate Mousse			
Desserts	Mango Tapioca Pudding			
Team Scores				Whole Total
Team	Score		Total	Whole Total
Lozz & Nols	3 / 10		13 / 50	36 / 90
Phillipe & Pascal	2 / 10		13 / 50	36 / 90
Marie & Emi	5 / 10		13 / 50	36 / 90
Christina & Tania	1 / 10		13 / 50	36 / 90
Aron & Vanessa	2 / 10		13 / 50	36 / 90
Judges' Scores				36 / 90
Judge	Score		Total	36 / 90
Judge	Food	Experience	Total	36 / 90
Tom	4 / 10	8 / 10	23 / 40	36 / 90
Scott	4 / 10	7 / 10	23 / 40	36 / 90

==== Marie & Emi - Japanese ====
- Episode 5
- Airdate — 4 August 2015

Private Dinner Details and Scores
5th Private Dinner
Meal	Marie & Emi - Japanese			
Entrées	Beef Tataki (with Ponzu Jelly)			
Entrées	Trip of Appetisers (Omelette, Pâté & Chicken Crackers)			
Mains	Lamb Cutlets (with Miso Sauce & Spicy Wedges)			
Mains	Bird's Nest Skewers (with Chicken Broth Rice)			
Desserts	Ginger Infused Crème Caramel			
Desserts	Tofu Doughnuts (with Matcha Cream)			
Team Scores				Whole Total
Team	Score		Total	Whole Total
Lozz & Nols	6 / 10		27 / 50	60 / 90
Phillipe & Pascal	6 / 10		27 / 50	60 / 90
Conrad & Liam	8 / 10		27 / 50	60 / 90
Christina & Tania	2 / 10		27 / 50	60 / 90
Aron & Vanessa	5 / 10		27 / 50	60 / 90
Judges' Scores				60 / 90
Judge	Score		Total	60 / 90
Judge	Food	Experience	Total	60 / 90
Tom	8 / 10	9 / 10	33 / 40	60 / 90
Scott	8 / 10	8 / 10	33 / 40	60 / 90

==== Lozz & Nols - Seafood ====
- Episode 6
- Airdate — 5 August 2015

Private Dinner Details and Scores
6th Private Dinner
Meal	Lozz & Nols - Seafood			
Entrées	Coconut Prawns (with Lime Aioli)			
Entrées	Atlantic Salmon Tacos			
Mains	Chicken Nolsey (Chicken Breast with Pumpkin, Feta & Caramelised Onion)			
Mains	Flinders Island Crayfish Platter (Mornay & Natural)			
Desserts	Tangy Lemon Tart (with Raspberry Coulis)			
Desserts	Peanut Butter Parfait (with Chocolate Ganache & Salted Caramel)			
Team Scores				Whole Total
Team	Score		Total	Whole Total
Marie & Emi	4 / 10		25 / 50	52 / 90
Phillipe & Pascal	5 / 10		25 / 50	52 / 90
Conrad & Liam	6 / 10		25 / 50	52 / 90
Christina & Tania	5 / 10		25 / 50	52 / 90
Aron & Vanessa	5 / 10		25 / 50	52 / 90
Judges' Scores				52 / 90
Judge	Score		Total	52 / 90
Judge	Food	Experience	Total	52 / 90
Tom	6 / 10	8 / 10	27 / 40	52 / 90
Scott	6 / 10	7 / 10	27 / 40	52 / 90

=== 1st Elimination Dinner ===
The 2 teams will cook 3 meals (like in the private dinners) over a 3-hour period, they must use 3 main ingredients but cooked to their style of cooking. The judges are joined by a special judge, Guillaume Brahimi, to judge the food. The over teams eat the food but do not judge it, the 2 teams are not given points but are only judge on how each meal tastes.

- Episode 7
- Airdate — 10 August 2015

Elimination Dinner Summary
WA	Christina & Tania	Dishes	Result
Meal		Italian	Advanced
Entrée		Kingfish Carpaccio	Advanced
Main		Chilli King Prawn Pasta	Advanced
Dessert		Passionfruit & Lime Teacake (with Mascarpone & Passion Fruit Syrup)	Advanced
WA	Conrad & Liam	Dishes	Result
Meal		Asian Fusion	Eliminated
Entrée		Seared Scallops (with Chilli Jam)	Eliminated
Main		Cured Kingfish (with Broth)	Eliminated
Dessert		Lime Posset (with Lemon Curd & Pistachio Crumble)	Eliminated

=== Makeover Round ===
Each team has $20,000 each to renovate their restaurant within 72 hours. Their menus will have a makeover, they are given 3 new recipes which they have to put their food style into. They must deliver 3 dishes (same as the private dinners), each team are judged out of 100.

==== Aron & Vanessa ====
- Episode 8
- Airdate — 11 August 2015

Makeover round summary
1st Makeover Round
Meal	Aron & Vanessa		
Entrée	Chicken & Shitake Pie (with Tamarind Caramel)		
Main	Prosciutto Wrapped Eye Fillet (with Balmain Bug)		
Dessert	Deconstructed Lamington		
Team Scores			Whole Total
Team	Score	Total	Whole Total
Lozz & Nolz	9 / 10	30 / 40	77 / 100
Christina & Tania	7 / 10	30 / 40	77 / 100
Marie & Emi	7 / 10	30 / 40	77 / 100
Phillipe & Pascal	7 / 10	30 / 40	77 / 100
Judges' Scores			77 / 100
Judge	Score	Total	77 / 100
Tom	24 / 30	47 / 60	77 / 100
Scott	23 / 30	47 / 60	77 / 100

==== Lozz & Nols ====
- Episode 9
- Airdate — 12 August 2015

Makeover round summary
2nd Makeover Round
Meal	Lozz & Nols		
Entrée	Crayfish Bisque (with Prawn Mousse Raviolo)		
Main	Stuffed Garfish (with Prosciutto, Potatoes, Okra & Capsicum Sauce)		
Dessert	Poached Quince Cheese Board (with Crème Anglaise)		
Team Scores			Whole Total
Team	Score	Total	Whole Total
Aron & Vanessa	6 / 10	22 / 40	57 / 100
Christina & Tania	6 / 10	22 / 40	57 / 100
Marie & Emi	5 / 10	22 / 40	57 / 100
Phillipe & Pascal	5 / 10	22 / 40	57 / 100
Judges' Scores			57 / 100
Judge	Score	Total	57 / 100
Tom	17 / 30	35 / 60	57 / 100
Scott	18 / 30	35 / 60	57 / 100

==== Phillipe & Pascal ====
- Episode 10
- Airdate — 17 August 2015

Makeover round summary
3rd Makeover Round
Meal	Phillipe & Pascal		
Entrée	Confit Ocean Trout (with Pickled Vegetables & Dill Vinaigrette)		
Main	Lamb Navarin (with Potato Macaire)		
Dessert	Gâteau Mont Blanc (with White Chocolate & Celery Sauce)		
Team Scores			Whole Total
Team	Score	Total	Whole Total
Aron & Vanessa	4 / 10	16 / 40	43 / 100
Christina & Tania	4 / 10	16 / 40	43 / 100
Marie & Emi	4 / 10	16 / 40	43 / 100
Lozz & Nols	4 / 10	16 / 40	43 / 100
Judges' Scores			43 / 100
Judge	Score	Total	43 / 100
Tom	13 / 30	27 / 60	43 / 100
Scott	14 / 30	27 / 60	43 / 100

==== Marie & Emi ====
- Episode 11
- Airdate — 18 August 2015

Makeover round summary
4th Makeover Round
Meal	Marie & Emi		
Entrée	Pork & Chicken Gyoza (with Cucumber Salad)		
Main	Bento Box (with Octopus Salad)		
Dessert	Yuzu Mousse Cake (with White Chocolate)		
Team Scores			Whole Total
Team	Score	Total	Whole Total
Aron & Vanessa	6 / 10	23 / 40	64 / 100
Christina & Tania	5 / 10	23 / 40	64 / 100
Phillipe & Pascal	6 / 10	23 / 40	64 / 100
Lozz & Nols	6 / 10	23 / 40	64 / 100
Judges' Scores			64 / 100
Judge	Score	Total	64 / 100
Tom	20 / 30	41 / 60	64 / 100
Scott	21 / 30	41 / 60	64 / 100

==== Christina & Tania ====
- Episode 12
- Airdate — 19 August 2015

Makeover round summary
5th Makeover Round
Meal	Christina & Tania		
Entrée	Stuffed Quail (with Polenta)		
Main	Osso Buco (with Saffron Rissoto)		
Dessert	Zuppa Inglese (Italian Trifle)		
Team Scores			Whole Total
Team	Score	Total	Whole Total
Aron & Vanessa	5 / 10	18 / 40	46 / 100
Marie & Emi	4 / 10	18 / 40	46 / 100
Phillipe & Pascal	4 / 10	18 / 40	46 / 100
Lozz & Nols	5 / 10	18 / 40	46 / 100
Judges' Scores			46 / 100
Judge	Score	Total	46 / 100
Tom	14 / 30	28 / 60	46 / 100
Scott	14 / 30	28 / 60	46 / 100

=== 2nd Elimination Dinner ===
- Episode 13
- Airdate — 24 August 2015

Elimination Dinner Summary
WA	Christina & Tania	Dishes	Result
Meal		Italian	Eliminated
Entrée		Barramundi (with Fennel purée)	Eliminated
Main		Crumbed Pork Cutlet (with Peperonata)	Eliminated
Dessert		Almond Panna Cotta (with Honey Almonds & Amaretto Cherries)	Eliminated
NSW	Phillipe & Pascal	Dishes	Result
Meal		French	Advanced
Entrée		Salade Paysanne	Advanced
Main		Pork Fillet (with Mustard Sauce)	Advanced
Dessert		Apple & Frangipane Tart (with Crème Anglaise)	Advanced

=== Finals - Public Dinners ===
Each team have to serve not only the other teams and judges' but also the general public, they will be judged be the general public. They will get help from their staff. Similar to the private dinners, each team will serve 2 different entrèes, mains & desserts. The eliminated teams will sit in with the public and score the overall experience. Two teams will be eliminated at the end of the round and the final two will go to the Grand Final.

==== Marie & Emi ====
- Episode 14
- Airdate — 25 August 2015

Public Dinner summary
1st Public Dinner
Meal	Marie & Emi		
Entrées	Homemade Soba Noodles (with chicken broth)		
Entrées	Tuna Tartare (with Avocado & Wasabi Puree and Jerusalem Artichoke)		
Mains	Miso Marinated Toothfish (with Black Garlic Sauce & Seaweed Salad)		
Mains	Slow Cooked Pork Belly (with Pumpkin Puree & Cabbage Slaw)		
Desserts	Black Sesame Panna Corta (with Shiso Granita)		
Desserts	Japanese Whiskey SemiFreddo (with Nashi Pear Compote & Shaved Chestnuts)		
Team Scores			Whole Total
Team	Score	Total	Whole Total
Aron & Vanessa	7 / 10	21 / 30	79 / 100
Phillipe & Pascal	7 / 10	21 / 30	79 / 100
Lozz & Nols	7 / 10	21 / 30	79 / 100
Judges' & Public Scores			79 / 100
Judge	Score	Total	79 / 100
Tom	25 / 30	58 / 70	79 / 100
Scott	24 / 30	58 / 70	79 / 100
Public (Avg)	9 / 10	58 / 70	79 / 100

==== Phillipe & Pascal ====
- Episode 15
- Airdate — 26 August 2015

Public Dinner summary
2nd Public Dinner
Meal	Phillipe & Pascal		
Entrées	Scallops (with Pea Puree & Bacon Vinaigrette)		
Entrées	Tomato Confit (with Goat's Cheese)		
Mains	Salmon Niçoise		
Mains	Sirloin (with Béarnaise Sauce)		
Desserts	Crème Caramel (with Lemon Myrtle)		
Desserts	Gratin of Berries		
Team Scores			Whole Total
Team	Score	Total	Whole Total
Aron & Vanessa	5 / 10	16 / 30	63 / 100
Marie & Emi	6 / 10	16 / 30	63 / 100
Lozz & Nols	5 / 10	16 / 30	63 / 100
Judges' & Public Scores			63 / 100
Judge	Score	Total	63 / 100
Tom	19 / 30	47 / 70	63 / 100
Scott	20 / 30	47 / 70	63 / 100
Public (Avg)	8 / 10	47 / 70	63 / 100

==== Aron & Vanessa ====
- Episode 16
- Airdate — 31 August 2015

Public Dinner summary
3rd Public Dinner
Meal	Aron & Vanessa		
Entrées	Wallaby Ragù (with Ricotta Gnocchi and Saltbush)		
Entrées	Poached Prawns (in Thai Broth with Asian Herb Salad)		
Mains	Herb Crusted Lamb Backstrap (with Pea Foam)		
Mains	Crispy Pork Jowl (with Cauliflower Puree)		
Desserts	Poached Pear (with Chocolate Mousse, Fennel Biscotti and Crème Anglaise)		
Desserts	Raspberry Brûlée Tart (with Crème Fraîche Sorbet & Strawberry Sherbet)		
Team Scores			Whole Total
Team	Score	Total	Whole Total
Phillipe & Pascal	7 / 10	20 / 30	71 / 100
Marie & Emi	6 / 10	20 / 30	71 / 100
Lozz & Nols	7 / 10	20 / 30	71 / 100
Judges' & Public Scores			71 / 100
Judge	Score	Total	71 / 100
Tom	22 / 30	51 / 70	71 / 100
Scott	21 / 30	51 / 70	71 / 100
Public (Avg)	8 / 10	51 / 70	71 / 100

==== Lozz & Nols ====
- Episode 17
- Airdate — 1 September 2015

Public Dinner summary
4th Public Dinner
Meal	Lozz & Nols		
Entrées	Pipis & Clams (with Prawn Velouté)		
Entrées	Poached Crayfish Salad (with Secret Sauce)		
Mains	Western Port Snapper (in Bouillebaise Broth with Confit Fennel)		
Mains	Sesaem Crusted Marlin (with Corn Puree)		
Desserts	Poached Rhubarb (with Pistachio Ice Cream)		
Desserts	Crème De Menthe Tart (with Chambord Granita & Whipped Ganache)		
Team Scores			Whole Total
Team	Score	Total	Whole Total
Phillipe & Pascal	6 / 10	18 / 30	68 / 100
Marie & Emi	6 / 10	18 / 30	68 / 100
Aron & Vanessa	6 / 10	18 / 30	68 / 100
Judges' & Public Scores			68 / 100
Judge	Score	Total	68 / 100
Tom	21 / 30	50 / 70	68 / 100
Scott	21 / 30	50 / 70	68 / 100
Public (Avg)	8 / 10	50 / 70	68 / 100

=== Grand Finale ===
The final two teams have to cook the best dishes of their lives, four courses in four hours judged by Tom, Scott and guest judge Guillaume Brahimi who will each score out of 10. The highest scoring team will win the competition.

- Episode 18
- Airdate — 2 September 2015

Grand Final Summary
Team		Judge's scores (out of 10)			Total (out of 30)	Result
Team		Tom	Scott	Guillaume	Total (out of 30)	Result
QLD	Marie & Emi	9	9	8	26	Winners
Meal		Japanese				Winners
Appetizer		Crab Chawanmushi with Salmon Roe & White Seaweed				Winners
Entrée		Smoked Eel Teriyaki with Pickled Onion, Apple & Bonito				Winners
Main		Duck Breast with Kombu Broth				Winners
Dessert		Bird's Nest Matcha Mess				Winners
NSW	Aron & Vanessa	8	9	7	24	Runners-up
Meal		Mod Aus				Runners-up
Appetizer		Smoked Salmon Mousse with Chive Oil				Runners-up
Entrée		Prawn Ravioli with Shellfish Cream & Butter Poached Marron				Runners-up
Main		Venison Fillet with Sweetbreads & Porcini Red Wine Sauce				Runners-up
Dessert		Caramel Parfait with Salted Peanut Dacquoise & Chocolate Mousse				Runners-up

== Series ratings ==
Title	Episodes	Premiere			Grand Finale					Average series rating	Average rank
Title	Episodes	Premiere date	Premiere ratings	Rank	Finale date	Finale ratings (Grand final)	Rank	Finale ratings (Winner announced)	Rank	Average series rating	Average rank
The Hotplate	18	28 July 2015	0.784	#7	2 September 2015	0.783	#9	0.850	#7	0.832	#8

== Ratings ==
Colour key:

Highest rating during the series
Lowest rating during the series
An elimination was held in this episode
Finals week

Week no.	Episode		Air date	Timeslot	Viewers (in millions)	Nightly rank	Source	Week Avg
1	1	Private Dinner 1: Christina & Tania - Italian	28 July 2015	Tuesday 7:30 pm	0.784	#7		0.717
1	2	Private Dinner 2: Phillipe & Pascal - French	29 July 2015	Wednesday 7:30 pm	0.713	#8		0.717
1	3	Private Dinner 3: Aron & Vanessa - Mod Aus	30 July 2015	Thursday 7:30 pm	0.656	#11		0.717
2	4	Private Dinner 4: Conrad & Liam - Asian Fusion	3 August 2015	Monday 7:30 pm	0.944	#6		0.933
2	5	Private Dinner 5: Marie & Emi - Japanese	4 August 2015	Tuesday 7:30 pm	0.942	#6		0.933
2	6	Private Dinner 6: Lozz & Nols - Seafood	5 August 2015	Wednesday 7:30 pm	0.913	#5		0.933
3	7	Elimination Dinner 1: Italian vs Asian Fusion	10 August 2015	Monday 7:30 pm	0.952	#6		0.851
3	8	Makeover Round 1: Aron & Vanessa - Mod Aus	11 August 2015	Tuesday 7:30 pm	0.839	#8		0.851
3	9	Makeover Round 2: Lozz & Nols - Seafood	12 August 2015	Wednesday 7:30 pm	0.764	#9		0.851
4	10	Makeover Round 3: Phillipe & Pascal - French	17 August 2015	Monday 7:30 pm	0.902	#7		0.853
4	11	Makeover Dinner 4: Marie & Emi - Japanese	18 August 2015	Tuesday 7:30 pm	0.883	#7		0.853
4	12	Makeover Dinner 5: Christina & Tania - Italian	19 August 2015	Wednesday 7:30 pm	0.775	#12		0.853
5	13	Elimination Dinner 2: Italian vs French	24 August 2015	Monday 7:30 pm	0.852	#8		0.811
5	14	Public Dinner 1: Marie & Emi - Japanese	25 August 2015	Tuesday 7:30 pm	0.815	#8		0.811
5	15	Public Dinner 2: Phillipe & Pascal - French	26 August 2015	Wednesday 7:30 pm	0.767	#10		0.811
6	16	Public Dinner 3: Aron & Vanessa - Mod Aus	31 August 2015	Monday 7:30 pm	0.850	#11		0.829
6	17	Public Dinner 4: Lozz & Nols - Seafood	1 September 2015	Tuesday 7:30 pm	0.833	#8		0.829
6	18	Grand Finale	2 September 2015	Wednesday 7:30 pm	0.783	#9		0.829
6	18	Winner Announced	2 September 2015	Wednesday 7:30 pm	0.850	#7		0.829

== Stolen concept ==
On 2 August 2015, Network Seven launched a Federal Court case against Nine for plagiarism over their show My Kitchen Rules due to them "using almost identical casting, costuming, sets, music, promotion and judging processes to MKR...We believe Nine has appropriated Seven's My Kitchen Rules original format and related production elements, and contravened copyright. That's why we're in court" said a Network Seven spokesperson. The legal battle will ensue on Tuesday 4 August. This follows after tension after Nine's Reno Rumble saw contestants from The Block competing against renovators from Seven's House Rules, however no legal proceedings followed because the contestants were no longer contracted to Seven.

On 6 August 2015, the courts ruled in Nine's favour and allowed the network to air the program, with Seven expected to appeal the verdict.

=== Cancellation ===
On 19 February 2016, Seven and Nine both lodged a mutually-agreed settlement in the Federal Court, Nine agreed not to produce any further episodes and not to rebroadcast or distribute the first season across the Nine Network, both sides paid their own legal costs.

== See also ==
- List of Australian television series
- My Kitchen Rules
- My Restaurant Rules
- MasterChef Australia
- Restaurant Revolution
