= Basque Culinary World Prize =

Global culinary award by Basque Government

Award ceremony.

The Basque Culinary World Prize is an annual global award co-founded by the Basque Government and the Basque Culinary Center in 2016. A prize of €100,000 is granted to a chef whose work has a wider socio-economic benefit. The winner is to use the prize to devote to a project of their choice that demonstrates the wider role of gastronomy in society.

The award is open to anyone with a professional background in cooking– regardless of their culinary culture or nationality– and whose work has made an impact in the fields such as innovation, technology, education, the environment, health, the food industry and social and economic development.

== History ==
The prize was co-founded by the Basque Government under the Euskadi-Basque Country Strategy and Basque Culinary Center (BCC), a higher education institution entirely dedicated to developing the economic and social potential of gastronomy.

== Previous winners ==
The first Basque Culinary World Prize was awarded in 2016 to María Fernanda Di Giacobbe from Venezuela, for her Cacao de Origen initiative – a network involving education, entrepreneurship, research and development around cocoa as a source of identity, culture and economic wealth in Venezuela. Through this network, the chef brought opportunities to financially vulnerable women, building capacities and empowering them; allowing them to become micro-entrepreneurs in the chocolate industry.

In 2017, the prize was awarded to Colombian chef Leonor Espinosa, for her Funleo project – a foundation which helps indigenous and afro-Colombian communities to identify, defend, and promote gastronomic traditions as a way of driving social and economic change.

The 2018 prize was awarded to Scottish-Australian chef Jock Zonfrillo, for his work in connecting indigenous communities in Australia to the rest of society by creating a market for their culinary heritage. His Orana Foundation works to preserve the sophisticated cooking knowledge and practice of indigenous Australians and promote the significance of these practices to a wider Australian audience. In 2019, the price was awarded to US chef Anthony Myint, who runs the Zero Foodprint and Perennial Farming Initiative. The ventures explore the cross-section between restaurants and the environment, by advising food businesses on viable options to reduce their carbon footprint, and even go carbon neutral. He has worked with the State of California on the Restore California programme, which arms suppliers and consumers with transparent information on the environmental footprint of restaurants so they can make better-informed decisions. All restaurants on the list can either be carbon neutral or support local farmers to remove carbon dioxide from the atmosphere.

YEAR	COUNTRY	NAME	INITIATIVE	REF.
2016	Venezuela	María Fernanda Di Giacobbe	Cacao de Origen	
2017	Colombia	Leonor Espinosa	Funleo	
2018	United Kingdom (Scotland)	Jock Zonfrillo	Orana Foundation	
2019	United States	Anthony Myint	Zero Foodprint and Perennial Farming Initiative	.
2020	United States	José Andrés	World Central Kitchen	
2021	Spain	Xanty Elîas	Los Niños se Comen El Futuro	
2022	Sierra Leone	Fatmata Binta	Dine on a mat	
2023	Turkey	Ebru Demir	Soil to Plate Agricultural Development Cooperative	
2024	Spain	Andrés Torres	NGO Global Humanitaria and Casa Nova	
2025	United States	Leticia Landa	La Cocina	
