= María Fernanda Di Giacobbe =

Venezuelan chocolatier (born 1964)

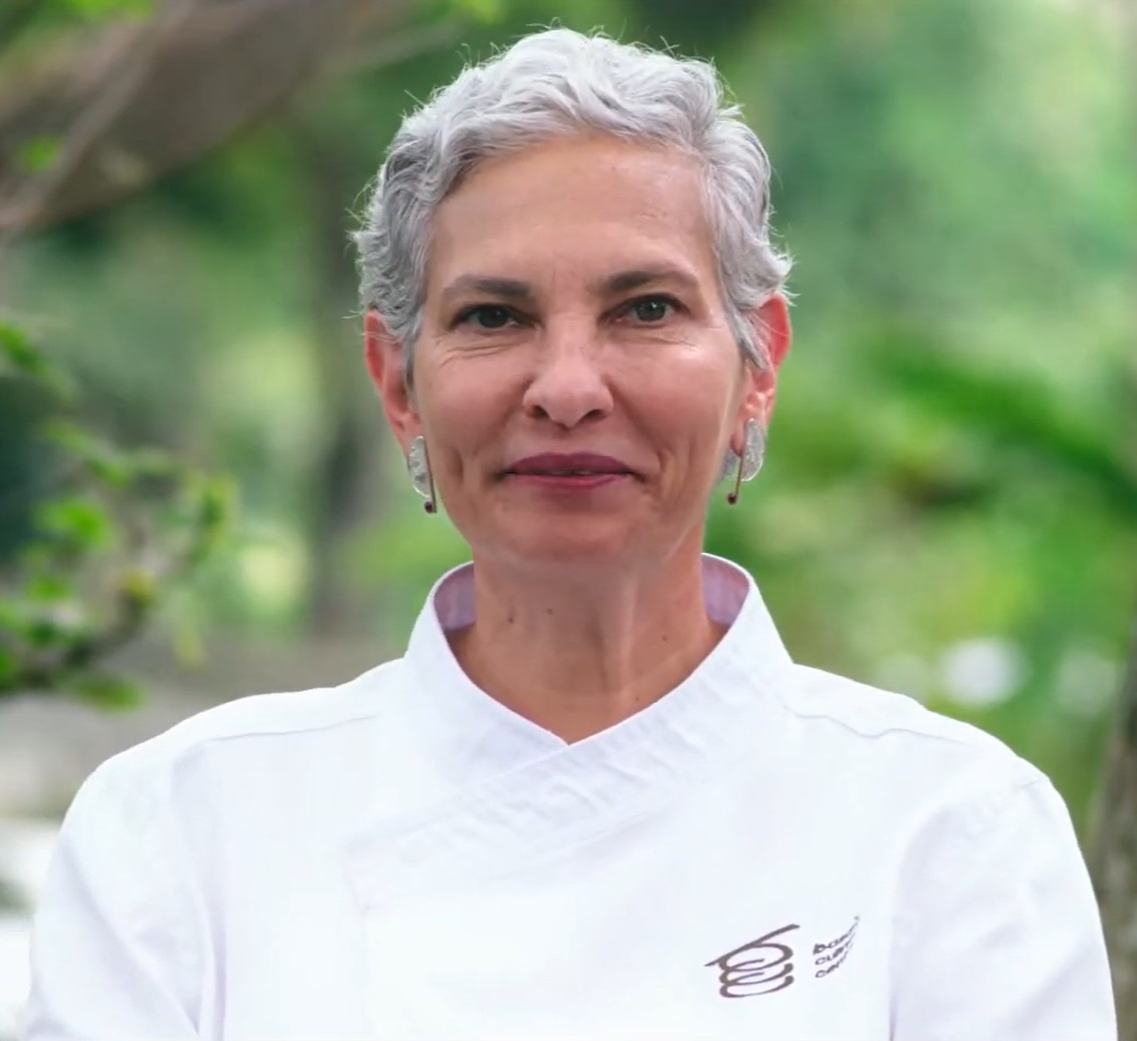
- Di Giacobbe in 2013
- Born: 1964 (age 61–62); Caracas, Venezuela
- Occupations: Chef, chocolatier, entrepreneur
- Awards: Basque Culinary World Prize (2016)

María Fernanda Di Giacobbe (born 1964) is a Venezuelan chocolatier, chef and entrepreneur. In 2016 she was awarded the first Basque Culinary World Prize, an international prize awarded annually since 2016 by the Basque government and the Basque Culinary Center.

== Biography ==
Di Giacobbe grew up in a family of gastronomes, where everyone since her grandmother was a cook or pastry chef, who in the 1940s founded a small store at the gates of her house where she sold fruits, vegetables and poultry. She graduated in philosophy and letters at the Universidad Central de Venezuela and later, in the early 1990s, opened her first restaurant: La Paninoteka. By 2002 Di Giacobbe had become a successful entrepreneur, owning ten restaurants. By the end of the year she joined the national civic strike against the government of Hugo Chávez, considering that "it had lost its way or perhaps it had never had a north in favor of the welfare of the whole country". As a consequence, she was expelled from the La Estancia Art Center and the Caracas Museum of Contemporary Art, and withdrew from the Caracas Athenaeum for political reasons. The restaurants La Paninoteka and La Empanadoteka could not be accessed by workers or customers because they were located in front of the headquarters of the state oil company Petróleos de Venezuela (PDVSA), whose street was closed for eight months. Her businesses went bankrupt except for the one in Las Mercedes.

After a trip in 2003 to Barcelona, Spain, Di Giacobbe was inspired to make chocolate and returned to Caracas, later traveling to Belgium, Japan, France and Italy for this purpose. Upon returning to Venezuela in 2004 she founded Kakao Bombones Venezolanos. In 2005 the governorship of Miranda, then headed by Henrique Capriles, invited her to teach cocoa classes in Barlovento. Later the women in Barlovento would help create the Diploma in Cocoa and Chocolate Management at the Simón Bolívar University.

In 2012 Di Giacobbe made the decision to visit rural areas of Venezuela to help lift socially excluded women out of poverty and vulnerability with the aim of changing the situation in the context of the national crisis; by 2017, 8 500 women had received workshops to teach them how to make chocolates. In 2013, she founded Cacao de Origen, a center in Caracas for the study, research and preservation of Venezuelan cocoa. The laboratory in Caracas and its two stores in the capital promote the relationship between new chocolate entrepreneurs, producers and customers. Some 18 cocoa-growing communities and 60 producers would join the Cacao de Origen project.

In 2015 Di Giacobbe was winner of the Gran Tenedor de Oro, the highest recognition awarded to chefs in Venezuela. In 2016 she recovered from uterine cancer and was awarded the first Basque Culinary World Prize, an international award given annually since 2016 by the Basque government and the Basque Culinary Center.

Di Giacobbe has written books such as Cacao y chocolate en Venezuela y Bombones venezolanos. She has also founded and initiated projects such as Proyecto Bombón, Proyecto San Benito and Río Caribe, the latter of which is a laboratory school in a small coastal town in the east of the country with the aim of making chocolates with stone mills and in small volumes. Together with the Universidad Simón Bolívar, by 2020 it had graduated 1,500 people in the Diploma in Cocoa Industry Management, 94% of whose students are women, and in its travels it gave rise to the Venezuelan bean-to-bar movement.

== Works ==
- Cacao y chocolate en Venezuela
- Bombones venezolanos
