= Simon Bryant =

Simon Bryant may refer to:

- Sir Simon Bryant (RAF officer) (born 1956)
- Simon Bryant (chef) (born 1965), Australian chef
- Simon Bryant (footballer) (born 1982), former footballer for Bristol Rovers
