= Fatmata =

Fatmata is a feminine given name. Notable people with the name include:

- Fatmata Binta (born 1980), Sierra Leonean-born chef and restauranteur
- Fatmata Fofanah (born 1985), Sierra Leonean-born Guinean athlete specializing in 100 metres hurdles
- Fatmata Turay, Sierra Leonean doctor and beauty pageant titleholder
