= Ebru Demir =

Turkish social activist and chef (born 1976)

- Born: Ebru Baybara; 1976 (age 48–49); Mardin, Turkey
- Education: Marmara University
- Culinary career
- Current restaurants: Cercis Murat Konağı; Zamarot 1890
- Awards won: Basque Culinary World Prize (2023); Aenne Burda Creative Leadership Award (2023)
- Website: ebrubaybarademir.com

Ebru Demir (née: Baybara; born 1976) is a Turkish social entrepreneur and chef. She has involved in many projects targeting women and biodiversity.

== Biography ==
She was born in Mardin in 1976 and was raised in Istanbul. She graduated from Marmara University receiving a degree in tourism in 1999. Following her graduation she settled in Mardin where she worked as a tourist guide. In 2001 she opened a touristic restaurant, Cercis Murat Mansion (Turkish: Cercis Murat Konağı), in Mardin together with 21 women. She also established another restaurant in Mardin named Zamarot 1890. She has focused on the characteristics of the Anatolian cuisine.

Demir is married and has three children.

=== Projects and activities ===
Demir has involved in social projects targeting the employment of women and biodiversity. She is the founder of the Soil to Plate Agricultural Development Cooperative and initiated an agriculture project, Biodegradable Waste Management Project from Soil to Soil. Under the former activity Mesopotamia's oldest wheat called Sorgul wheat was reproduced. HBO Max produced a documentary, 12 Zero-Waste Chefs of the World, about Demir. She represented Turkey in the World Forum on Gastronomy Tourism organized by the United Nations's World Tourism Organization.

Through her projects, such as Kitchen of Hope and her Harran Gastronomy School, Demir has helped the Syrian refugees as well as local women, teaching them skills such as baking, gardening, farming and mushroom cultivation. Her projects also include literacy programs for them.

Following the earthquake which hit southern and central Turkey on 6 February 2023, Demir started a soup kitchen in Hatay which is still open.

=== Awards ===
Demir is the recipient of various awards, including the Basque Culinary World Prize (2023) and the Aenne Burda Creative Leadership Award (2023).
