= Restaurant Revolution =

Australian reality television series

- Genre: Reality
- Presented by: Jock Zonfrillo
- Judges: Erez Gordon; Jess Ho; John Lethlean; Neil Perry; Jock Zonfrillo (secret critic)
- Country of origin: Australia
- Original language: English
- No. of series: 1
- No. of episodes: 21

Production
- Running time: 90 to 120 minutes (including commercials)

Original release
- Network: Seven Network
- Release: 28 July – 10 September 2015

Related
- My Kitchen Rules

Restaurant Revolution was an Australian cooking reality television series which screened on the Seven Network in 2015. The show consisted of five teams of one, two, three or four people with a pre-existing relationship competing to turn their vision for a restaurant into a reality. The teams were given the chance to design and run their own pop-up restaurant with viewers able to dine in and experience the food, service and atmosphere. The show was hosted by Scottish-born restaurateur Jock Zonfrillo.

Teams are scored and judged by a panel of experts. The industry expert panel consists of Neil Perry (chef and restaurateur), Erez Gordon (front-of-house specialist), John Lethlean (food critic) and Jess Ho (brand strategist). They were also scored on how much profit they made each week.

== Restaurants and contestants ==
The teams were from the five largest capital cities in Australia. Their restaurants were constructed out of shipping containers located in an iconic spot for each city. The layout for every restaurant was identical and each seated 60 guests. It was up to the teams to determine the theme, atmosphere, exterior and interior details of their restaurants. All restaurants officially opened to the public on 14 July, a few weeks before they aired on the show.

| City | Location | Restaurant | Contestants |
|---|---|---|---|
| Sydney | Centenary Square, Parramatta | Somewhere Nice | Dom Aboud |
| Adelaide | Victoria Square, Adelaide | 28 St | David, Asa, Reine and Anthony Donehue |
| Brisbane | Corner Russell/Grey St, South Bank | Puerto | John McIntosh, Justine & Maggie Yeong |
| Melbourne | Lower Esplanade, St Kilda | Scarfo | Nathan Scarfo & Maz Koutsonikolas |
| Perth | 103 Oxford St, Leederville | La Linea | Carmen & Nicole Watts |

== Competition details ==
- Restaurant Pre-opening - During this first stage of the competition, teams must earn cash to be able to build the interior of their restaurants, purchase supplies and prepare their staff. For each of the first two challenges, there was a total cash pool of $100,000 on offer. The experts distributed this cash based on how well the teams pitch or present their potential restaurant, food and service. The team who best meets the expert's requirements receives $40,000, second receives $20,000, third and fourth get $15,000 each and finally the worst performing team receives only $10,000. In the final 'last chance pitch', the experts only gave a total of $40,000 to the three best teams, with two teams missing out on the final cash offer.
- Team Lunch - Each week, one team hosts a lunch inviting in all other teams, where they will be able to judge the food and service of each competing restaurant. Teams are given $50 to use for tips, which they can use up to all or none of. This process happens alongside the Weekly reviews. In Week 5, it was revealed that for every $10 tip, the team earns 1 point on their final scores.
- Weekly Reviews - The experts will individually visit each of the restaurants on a weekly rotation. They judge the food and service based on their visit and give the team an overall score out of 10. A 5th 'secret critic' also joins the experts judging one team a week. Their identity remains anonymous, therefore teams do not know when or who will arrive to judge. Teams are also ranked for their profitability, with the team earning the highest profit margin getting 5 points added to the expert score and then the other teams ranked 4 to 1 point/s. The team with the highest overall score will gain one extra 4 seat table to use for the following week's service, while the lowest scoring team, loses a 4-seat table, which remains present but is taped off as if it was damaged. From Week 2, there are also chef's special challenges. The team who sells the most of this dish earns 2 bonus points on top of their profit score.
  - Week 2 Chef's Special – Teams are to create a 'chef's special' dish. It must be completely new and not a variation of their existing menu, priced at no lower than $15.
  - Week 3 Chef's Special – 'State on a plate'. Teams must create a special dish that represents their home state.
  - Week 4 Chef's Special – Teams must create a burger that represents their restaurant.

Weekly progress, scores and cash earnings
| Progress | Pre-opening Week | | | Week 1 | | | Week 2 | | | | Week 3 | | | | Week 4 | | | | Week 5 | | | Week 6 | | | Final Results |
| Progress | Cash earnings | | | Expert scores | Profit (1-5) | Total | Team Lunch | Expert scores | Profit (1-5) | Total | Team Lunch | Expert scores | Profit (1-5) | Total | Team Lunch | Expert scores | Profit (1-5) | Total | Team Lunch | | Total Tips | Expert scores | Profit (1-5) | Total | Final Results |
| Team Restaurant | First Pitch | Cook For Cash | Last Chance Pitch | Expert scores | Profit (1-5) | Total | Team Lunch | Expert scores | Profit (1-5) | Total | Team Lunch | Expert scores | Profit (1-5) | Total | Team Lunch | Expert scores | Profit (1-5) | Total | Team Lunch | | Total Tips | Expert scores | Profit (1-5) | Total | Final Results |
| Adelaide; 28 St | $40,000 | $15,000 | $10,000 | 6 (John) | 3 | 9 | Tipped $0 | 7 (Jess) | 4 (+2) | 13 | Host | 8 (Secret Critic) | 4 (+2) | 14 | Tipped $20 | 9 (Erez) | 1 | 10 | Tipped $10 | Tipped $10 | 8 ($80) | 7.5 (Neil) | 3 | 10.5 | Winner (64.5) |
| Sydney; Somewhere Nice | $20,000 | $15,000 | $10,000 | 5 (Erez) | 5 | 10 | Host | 5 (Secret Critic) | 5 | 10 | Tipped $10 | 6 (Jess) | 3 | 9 | Tipped $30 | 8 (Neil) | 5 | 13 | Tipped $10 | Tipped $20 | 5 ($50) | 8 (John) | 5 | 13 | 2nd (60) |
| Brisbane; Puerto | $10,000 | $40,000 | $0 | 6.5 (Neil) | 2 | 8.5 | Tipped $20 | 7.5 (Erez) | 2 | 9.5 | Tipped $20 | 6 (John) | 2 | 8 | Host | 7 (Secret Critic) | 4 (+2) | 13 | Tipped $10 | Tipped $0 | 9 ($90) | 6 (Jess) | 4 | 10 | 3rd (58) |
| Perth; La Linea | $15,000 | $20,000 | $0 | 5.5 (Jess) | 4 | 9.5 | Tipped $20 | 6.5 (Neil) | 1 | 7.5 | Tipped $30 | 7.5 (Erez) | 5 | 12.5 | Tipped $20 | 6.5 (John) | 3 | 9.5 | Host | Tipped $30 | 6 ($60) | 6 (Secret Critic) | 2 | 8 | 4th (53) |
| Melbourne; Scarfo | $15,000 | $10,000 | $20,000 | 6 (Secret Critic) | 1 | 7 | Tipped $10 | 7 (John) | 3 | 10 | Tipped $20 | 9 (Neil) | 1 | 10 | Tipped $20 | 8 (Jess) | 2 | 10 | Tipped $30 | Host | 6 ($60) | 7 (Erez) | 1 | 8 | 5th (51) |

== Episodes and ratings ==
Restaurant Revolution suffered low ratings during its launch. As a result, Seven has taken action by reducing the show's running from four to two to just one night a week. The program also moved starting time.

Restaurant Revolution Colour key: – Highest rating during the season – Lowest rating during the season
| Ratings Week | Episode No. | Episode summary | Original airdate | Timeslot | Viewers | Rank (Night) | Ref. |
|---|---|---|---|---|---|---|---|
| 1 | 1 | Premiere/First Pitch - The five teams' restaurants are introduced in major capital cities around Australia. In their first challenge, teams pitch their restaurant concept, food and vision to the expert panel to earn the first share of funds. $100,000 was the total prize pool distributed among the teams based on their efforts for their pitch from best to worst. | 28 July 2015 | Tuesday 7:30 pm | 676,000 | #12 | |
| 1 | 2–3 | Cook For Cash - The four experts dined at each restaurant for a 'cook for cash' challenge. Each team was given 24 hours notice prior to the experts arrival. Once they have arrived, teams had one hour to serve a three course lunch with table service, either with or without additional hired help. The experts gave their opinions on their restaurant experience for each team and ranked them from best to worst to distribute the $100,000 prize pool. | 29 July 2015 | Wednesday 7:30 pm | 515,000 | #18 | |
| 1 | 4 | Last Chance Pitch - Teams returned in front of the experts for the final 'Last chance pitch', to earn the final offer of cash for the preparation of their restaurants. Only $40,000 was on offer as the total pool, with just the three best teams leaving with money. Additionally, each of the teams held a hiring day in search for potential staff and leadership roles. | 30 July 2015 | Thursday 7:30 pm | 415,000 | <20 | |
| 2 | 5 | Grand Opening - The teams complete their restaurants and open them to the public for the first time. Each team hold a launch party, inviting VIP guests to dine in. | 3 August 2015 | Monday 7:30 pm | 522,000 | #20 | |
| 2 | 6 | Expert Visits Week 1-1 - All teams open their restaurants to a lunch and dinner service for paying customers for the first time. The four experts will each individually dine at one of the restaurants to judge its food, service and atmosphere. Neil Perry and Erez Gordon were the first experts to visit the Brisbane and Sydney restaurants respectively. | 3 August 2015 | Monday 7:30 pm | 522,000 | #20 | |
| 2 | 7 | Expert Visits Week 1-2 - The teams continue to open their restaurants to a lunch and dinner service. Continuing the Expert visits, John Lethlean headed to Adelaide and Jess Ho to Perth to judge the food and service of the restaurant. Also, team Melbourne were the first to be judged by 'The Secret Critic' who remained anonymous during their restaurant service. | 6 August 2015 | Thursday 8:00 pm | 427,000 | <20 | |
| 2 | 8 | Week 1 Results - The first week's results are in. Each expert gives their review and scored their restaurant experience out of 10. Teams also received bonus points based on their profit margin which are added to the expert scores. The highest scoring restaurant gains an advantage by receiving an extra table for next week's service, while the losing team has one table taken away. | 6 August 2015 | Thursday 8:00 pm | 427,000 | <20 | |
| 3 | 9 | Sydney Team Lunch - All teams visit Dom's restaurant in Sydney for the first Team Lunch. They were all given up to $50 to tip for their food and service. Perth and Brisbane tipped $20 each, Melbourne tipped $10 and Adelaide decided to give nothing. | 13 August 2015 | Thursday 8:00 pm | 312,000 | <20 | |
| 3 | 10 | Expert Visits Week 2 - The experts travel around the country for another round of judging. Neil Perry visits Perth, Jess Ho to Adelaide, Erez Gordon to Brisbane, John Lethlean to Melbourne and finally Sydney receives the anonymous 'Secret Critic'. All experts score their experience out of 10. | 13 August 2015 | Thursday 8:00 pm | 312,000 | <20 | |
| 3 | 11 | Week 2 Results - The scores are tallied up for the week with the expert scores, profit and bonus points for winning the challenge of selling the most 'Chef's Specials'. Adelaide wins the week getting one bonus table for next week and Perth last, losing a table. | 13 August 2015 | Thursday 8:00 pm | 312,000 | <20 | |
| 4 | 12 | Adelaide Team Lunch - All teams headed to team Adelaide's restaurant for the second team lunch to experience their food and service. With each team given up to $50 to tip, Melbourne and Brisbane left $20 each, Perth $30 and Sydney tipped $10. | 20 August 2015 | Thursday 8:30 pm | 298,000 | <20 | |
| 4 | 13 | Expert Visits Week 3 - In another round of expert visits, Jess Ho visits Sydney, Neil Perry to Melbourne, Erez Gordon to Perth, John Lethlean to Brisbane and a 'secret critic' for Adelaide. All restaurants are judged and scored, with Melbourne receiving the highest expert score so far of 9 out of 10. | 20 August 2015 | Thursday 8:30 pm | 298,000 | <20 | |
| 4 | 14 | Week 3 Results - The final scores for profit and expert scores are complete for the week. The 'chef's special' saw teams creating a dish that represented their home state in a 'State on a plate' challenge. Adelaide takes the win for a second week in a row and Brisbane falls into last place. | 20 August 2015 | Thursday 8:30 pm | 298,000 | <20 | |
| 5 | 15 | Brisbane Team Lunch - Brisbane is next in line to host the team lunch for all other teams to show off their 'East meets Mex' themed restaurant. At the end most teams left a $20 tip, while Sydney leaves $30. | 27 August 2015 | Thursday 8:30 pm | 297,000 | <20 | |
| 5 | 16 | Expert Visits Week 4 - The expert visit rotations continue. This week Neil Perry visits Sydney, Jess Ho to Melbourne, Erez Gordon to Adelaide, John Lethlean to Perth and the 'secret critic' heads to Brisbane. | 27 August 2015 | Thursday 8:30 pm | 297,000 | <20 | |
| 5 | 17 | Week 4 Results - The final results for week 4 saw Brisbane and Sydney take a joint top spot and Perth falling into last place. The bonus chef's special challenge had every team making a signature burger for their restaurant. | 27 August 2015 | Thursday 8:30 pm | 297,000 | <20 | |
| 6 | 18 | Perth Team Lunch - Perth hosts the team lunch, inviting all teams to La Linea to critique. | 3 September 2015 | Thursday 8:30 pm | 275,000 | <20 | |
| 6 | 19 | Melbourne Team Lunch - Nathan and Maz host the final team lunch at Scarfo in Melbourne. | 3 September 2015 | Thursday 8:30 pm | 275,000 | <20 | |
| 6 | 20 | Week 5 Results - After the final Team Lunches, it was revealed that every $10 tip earned receives 1 point. These became the scores for this week | 3 September 2015 | Thursday 8:30 pm | 275,000 | <20 | |
| 7 | 21 | Grand Final - The experts complete their final round of visits with Jess Ho in Brisbane, Neil Perry in Adelaide, Erez Gordon in Melbourne, John Lethlean in Sydney and the secret critic for Perth. Teams also finished their final restaurant service before the final results were announced. All scores from each week are combined to determine the winner of Restaurant Revolution with a prize of $200,000. | 10 September 2015 | Thursday 9:30 pm | 183,000 | <20 | |

== See also ==
- List of Australian television series
- List of cooking shows
- My Kitchen Rules
- My Restaurant Rules
- MasterChef Australia
- The Hotplate
