= Maggie Beer =

Australian cook, food author, restaurateur, and food manufacturer (born 1945)

Maggie Beer AO
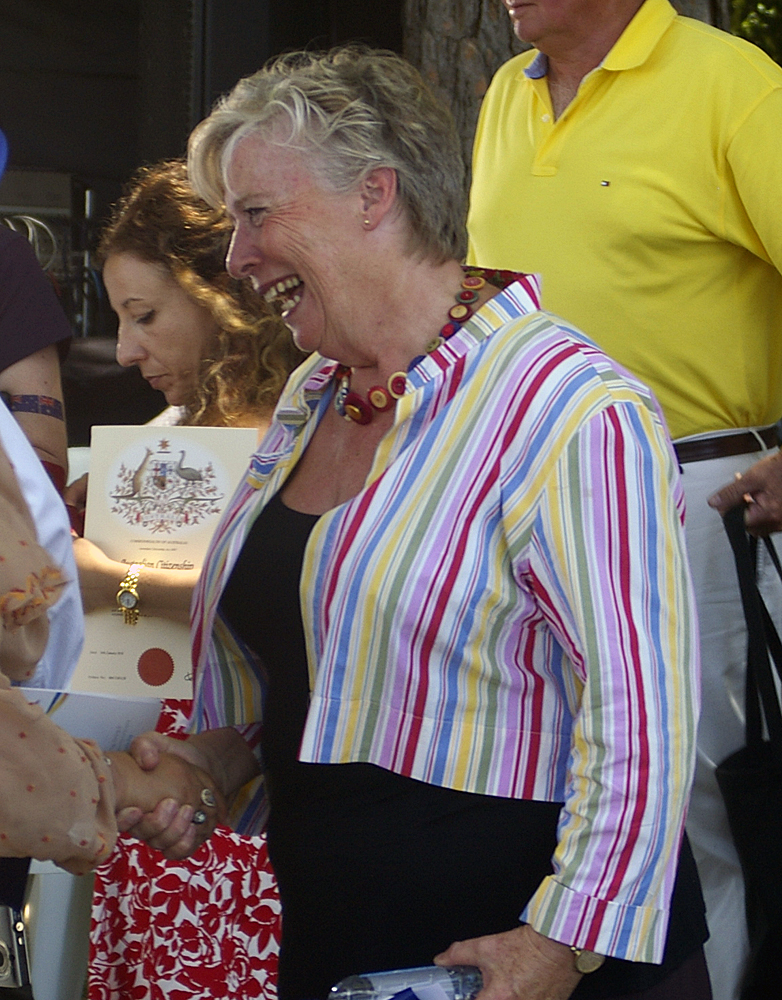
- Beer at the Australia Day citizenship ceremony at Commonwealth Park in Canberra
- Born: Margaret Anne Ackerman; 19 January 1945 (age 81); Sydney, New South Wales, Australia
- Spouse: Colin Beer (m. 1970)
- Children: 2
- Culinary career
- Current restaurants
- Barossa Pheasant Farm Restaurant, Charlick's Feed Store
- Television shows
- The Great Australian Bake Off, The Cook and the Chef
- Award
- Australian Publishers Association's Illustrated Book of the Year
- Website: maggiebeer.com.au

Maggie Beer AO (born Margaret Anne Ackerman, 19 January 1945) is an Australian chef, food author, restaurateur, and food manufacturer. Beer was one of the judges on The Great Australian Bake Off alongside Matt Moran until 2022 and is also a regular guest on MasterChef Australia.

== Early life ==
Maggie Beer was born in Sydney on 19 January 1945, to Ronald Ackerman, who was of German ancestry through his paternal grandparents, and Doreen Carter, who had English ancestry from her maternal great-grandparents. Her father's ancestors were gold miners in Hill End in regional New South Wales. Beer believed they were Jewish, but an episode of Who Do You Think You Are? found that her ancestors had been Catholic for as long as there were records.

Beer grew up in Sydney's western suburbs. Beer's parents faced issues with bankruptcy as she was growing up and re-invented themselves as caterers. She stated this contributed to her strong work ethic later in life. Beer did not complete her high school education, and instead left school at the age of 14 to support her family in various jobs, including as a lift operator in a New Zealand department store and an assistant to a senior geophysicist for BP in Libya before returning to Sydney in 1968. Beer has traced her passion for food to her childhood: "Food was vital; there was a real interest in food and its quality and an obsession with freshness. Cooking was just accepted; it was part of the norm."

== Career ==
Beer was not formally trained as a chef. Her only paid cooking job was at a Scottish sailing school during a European trip in her early twenties. She stated: "I used the whole of their larder for the four-month season in eight weeks because I'm a very generous cook; that's the only way I know how to cook". After relocating from Sydney to the Barossa Valley, Maggie and her husband Colin established the Farm Shop in 1979, which morphed into the Barossa Pheasant Farm Restaurant later that year. The restaurant became known for serving locally sourced pheasant as well as a pâté, known as Pheasant Farm Pate. In 1991, the restaurant was awarded the Remy Martin Cognac – Australian Gourmet Traveller Restaurant of the Year award. Maggie and Colin operated the restaurant until 1993. Later, she became a partner in the Charlick's Feed Store restaurant in Ebenezer Place, located in the Adelaide city centre.

Beer operated a business in the Barossa that produces a range of gourmet foods, including Pheasant Farm Pate, quince paste, verjuice and gourmet ice creams. The Maggie Beer Farm Shop started in 1979 and grew from there. 48% of the business was sold to Longtable in 2016, with the remainder sold to the same buyer in 2019. She co-hosted the ABC television cooking program The Cook and the Chef with Simon Bryant, who is the Head Chef for the Hilton, Adelaide. She has also appeared several times as a guest judge and guest masterclass presenter on MasterChef Australia.

Beer has written books about food and food preparation, as well as co-authoring a book with noted cook, restaurateur and food writer Stephanie Alexander. One of her co-written books, Stephanie Alexander and Maggie Beer's Tuscan Cook, has been translated into five different languages. In 2012, she participated in Who Do You Think You Are, a show which uncovered a convicted bigamist in her family history.

In April 2015, Beer and Matt Moran were announced as the judges of the second season of The Great Australian Bake Off, which aired on LifeStyle Food from 13 October 2015. She remained a judge for a further four seasons and appeared as a guest in season 7.

In 2023, Beer began filming in Western Australia for a new ABC series premiering in 2024. The series, Maggie Beer's Big Mission, focuses on improving the food and dining experience in aged care facilities.

== Honours ==
In 1997, Beer was the Telstra South Australian Business Woman of the Year.

Beer was awarded the Centenary Medal on 1 January 2001 for service to Australian society through cooking and writing.

In 2008, Maggie Beer won the Australian Publishers Association's illustrated Book of the Year for Maggie's Harvest.

She was awarded the "Senior Australian of the Year" in 2010. In the same year she presented the Dymphna Clark Memorial Lecture.

In the Australia Day Honours of 2012, Maggie Beer was appointed a Member of the Order of Australia (AM), "for service to the tourism and hospitality industries as a cook, restaurateur and author, and to the promotion of Australian produce and cuisine".

In April 2016, Beer was awarded an honorary doctorate from the University of South Australia in recognition of her achievements in tourism and hospitality, and to the promotion of Australian produce and cuisine.

In 2022, Beer was promoted to Officer of the Order of Australia (AO) in the 2022 Australia Day Honours for "distinguished service to the tourism and hospitality industries as a cook, restaurateur and author, and to aged welfare".

== Personal life ==
She married Colin Beer on 17 January 1970, and they own a cottage home in the Barossa Valley in South Australia. She has two daughters. Her elder daughter died suddenly on 14 February 2020, aged 46.

== Works ==
- Cooking With Verjuice
- Stephanie Alexander and Maggie Beer's Tuscan Cookbook
- Maggie's Table
- Maggie's Harvest
- Maggie's Kitchen
- Maggie's Orchard
- Maggie's Christmas
- Maggie's Farm
- Maggie's Verjuice Cookbook
- Winter Harvest
- Maggie's Recipe For Life

== See also ==
- South Australian food and drink
