= Les Saveurs de Jean-Christophe Novelli =

Restaurant in London

Coordinates: 51.506°N 0.148°W

- Interactive map of Les Saveurs de Jean-Christophe Novelli

Restaurant information
- Location: London, United Kingdom

Les Saveurs de Jean-Christophe Novelli, previously known as Les Saveurs, was a restaurant in Curzon Street, Mayfair, London, run by chef proprietor Jean-Christophe Novelli.

The restaurant was Novelli's sixth to be opened in the Novelli Group, in partnership with Rocco Forte's RF Hotels. Owned by Marco Pierre White in the mid 1990s, it was bought by RF Hotels in April 1997, and leased to Novelli. In the contract, Novelli agreed to pay 10% of turnover or a minimum of £100,000 a year to Forte.

The restaurant opened in 1998, but was closed a year later, after losing money. Gordon Ramsay described the takeover as "astonishing, and involved Jean-Christophe Novelli, a man who Marco probably thinks should be in his eternal debt. Marco was dying to get his hands on Les Saveurs, in Curzon Street." Hospitality described the restaurant as "the upmarket Mayfair eatery that earned him [Novelli] yet another Michelin Star".

The venue reopened in 1999 as Novelli at Curzon Street.
