= The Cook and the Chef =

- Genre: Cooking show
- Directed by: Kristy Copley; Susan Redden; Mark Stanforth
- Starring: Maggie Beer; Simon Bryant
- Country of origin: Australia
- No. of seasons: 4
- No. of episodes: 154

Production
- Executive producer: Margot Phillipson
- Producer: Colin Haynes
- Production locations: South Australia, Barossa Valley
- Cinematography: Chris Moon
- Running time: 30 minutes per episode

Original release
- Network: ABC TV
- Release: 8 February 2006 – 16 September 2009

The Cook and the Chef is an Australian television series featuring cook Maggie Beer and chef Simon Bryant. The Cook and the Chef was screened on ABC1 and was filmed in the Barossa Valley, South Australia, with the first episode going to air on 8 February 2006.

The series, consisting of four series and 154 episodes, aired on Wednesdays at 6:30 pm. Repeats of the show currently air on SBS Food.

== Cast ==
Main

- Maggie Beer
- Simon Bryant

Guest

- Chris Abbot (1 episode, 2008)
- Peter Cundall (1 episode, 2008)
- Dominic Scarfo (1 episode, 2008)
- Rick Stein (1 episode, 2008)
- Tetsuya Wakuda (1 episode, 2009)

== Finale ==
In July 2009, Maggie Beer and Simon Bryant announced they had decided to end the series after four years. The finale aired on 16 September 2009 with "Party" as the theme of the episode.

Beer explained her decision to end the series: "The demands of filming on my family and business have led me to the difficult decision to leave the show. It's been a privilege for me to have been able to share my passion for food with Simon and our audience. It always gives me joy when I feel I have inspired people to explore the wonderful produce that Australia has to offer."

Bryant recalled: "When I started the show I had no idea that my journey with Maggie about the love of food would teach me so much, and I'll miss the camaraderie of our days in the kitchen together. I have to laugh when people call me a celebrity chef, I don't think people realise that I have a whole other life, coordinating 800 or so meals a day as an Executive Chef at a five-star hotel. I am looking forward to spending a bit more time back in my kitchens… and getting a little more sleep will be a bonus!"

== DVD Releases ==
- The Cook and the Chef: The Four Seasons (8 Disc Box Set) - 7 November 2007
- The Cook and the Chef: The Complete Series 2 (8 Disc Box Set) (BONUS Recipe Book) - 3 November 2009
- The Cook and the Chef: The Complete Series 3 (8 Disc Box Set) (BONUS Note Book) - 31 March 2010
- The Cook and the Chef: The Complete Series 4 (4 Disc Box Set) - 4 November 2010

== See also ==
- List of Australian television series
- List of cooking shows
