= Leonor Espinosa =

Leonor Espinosa De La Ossa, also known by her nickname 'Leo', is a Colombian chef whose Bogotá restaurant, Leo Cocina y Cava, featuring a fusion of traditional and modern Colombian cuisine, first brought her to international attention when it opened in 2007. Espinosa appears regularly on Colombian television, and also runs the restaurants Leo Cocina y Cava and Misia.

Her restaurant Leo Cocina y Cava was ranked in 2007 as one of the top 82 restaurants in the world by Condé Nast Traveller and has been awarded in 2014 and 2015 as one of the best restaurants in Colombia according to S. Pellegrino list of Latin Americas's 50 Best Restaurants.

== Personal life and family ==
Leonor was born on January 12, 1963, in Cartago, Valle del Cauca, Colombia. She is the second of six children of Juan Antonio Espinosa and Josefina De la Ossa de Espinosa, originally from Sincé, a municipality located in the Colombian Caribbean region. These roots have printed the character and personality of Leonor, exerting a huge influence on her culinary proposal.

Leonor grew up and lived most of her youth in Cartagena, Bolívar, where she studied Economics and Fine Arts. Later, she devoted herself to marketing and advertising, achieving significant recognition in various agencies in Bogota during the 90's. Since 1998, Leonor decided to take her passion for arts to the culinary field through research and experiential learning of techniques, preparations and traditional ingredients of her country.

Her only daughter, Laura Hernandez Espinosa, studied International Relations and is a professional sommelier, Corporate Social Responsibility expert and MA in Development Studies with emphasis on food security. Laura is currently a business partner in various business ventures and also heads Espinosa's FUNLEO foundation.

== Career and restaurants ==
Originally, Espinosa trained in economics and subsequently, in advertising and fine arts. She began to use food as a means to express creativity, and took a position at the Bogotá restaurant Claroscuro, before being finally able to open her own restaurant, Leo Cocina y Cava, in 2007.

Her signature style, developed at Leo Cocina y Cava, is the use of traditional ingredients (many of them unknown in popular cuisine) that are part of the cultural fiber of disenfranchised indigenous, afro-descendant and peasant communities of Colombia. Espinosa does not restrict herself to any of the eight culinary regions of the country, but blends them all 'capturing authentic flavours while adding a modern twist and classy presentation'. This fusion, she credits, in part, to her upbringing in Cartagena, which, with its mix of Spanish, African and native Indian cultures, Espinosa considers to be the 'birthplace of Colombian cuisine'.

In 2008, The New York Times wrote that Espinosa's 'culinary experiments are both delicious and peculiar'. Leo Cocina y Cava was chosen by Condé Nast Traveller magazine as one of its 82 best restaurants in the world, and, subsequently, was included as one of the 105 best dining experiences in the world by National Geographic Traveler, in early 2010.

Starting in June, 2015, Espinosa opened her latest casual concept, Misia, located a few steps from the National Museum where honours Colombian flavours.

Espinosa has supported government efforts to promote Colombia as a 'gastronomy tourism destination' at overseas events in Spain and Washington, D.C. The Colombian Ambassador to the United Kingdom has described her as the chef that 'whets the appetite' for Colombian cuisine.

== FUNLEO foundation ==
Espinosa established the Leo Espinosa Foundation, or FUNLEO, which is managed by her daughter Laura, with the aim of 'the preservation of Colombia's food traditions while highlighting sustainable practices and local production'. This assists Colombia's afro-descendat, indigenous and peasant communities, by helping them to develop and market their traditional crops and ingredients. The FUNLEO motto is 'Gastronomy for Development' and, as Espinosa explains:

"We try to develop the local food, not just the cuisine: our attention is not focused only in the kitchen, but also in resources, local products from these rural communities that have lost, shall we say, a place within Colombian agriculture."

Espinosa sees both a cultural and economic value in the country's 'unique identity': 'Once we develop our gastronomic potential from the farm, once we promote and market our resources and crops, Colombia can become the new gastronomic capital of the world.'

On 8 March 2013, FUNLEO partnered with Oxfam to work on the GROW sustainable food production campaign in Colombia, among other development projects held by international cooperation agencies as USAID.

== Awards ==
- Best Culinary Proposal: Leo Cocina y Cava (Revista La Barra, 2005)
- Most Innovative Restaurant: Leo Cocina y Cava (Revista La barra, 2005)
- Breakthrough Award: Leo Cocina y Cava (Revista La Barra, 2005, 2007)
- 82 best restaurants in the world, (Condé Nast Traveller magazine, 2007)
- Breakthrough Chef : Leonor Espinosa (Revista La Barra, 2005, 2007)
- Best Colombian Typical Cuisine Restaurant (Revista La Barra, 2007, 2008, 2009)
- 105 best dining experiences in the world (National Geographic Traveler, 2010)
- Best Colombian Chef (Premios La Barra, 2012)
- "En su mesa, 5 chefs colombianas con recetas para todos los días", Best Book of World Women Chefs (Paris Festival Du Livre De Cuisine, 2011)
- Latin Americas's 50 Best Restaurants, (2014-2015)
- 20 best leaders in Colombia (Revista Semana, 2015)
