= Fatmata Binta =

Sierra Leonean chef (born 1980)

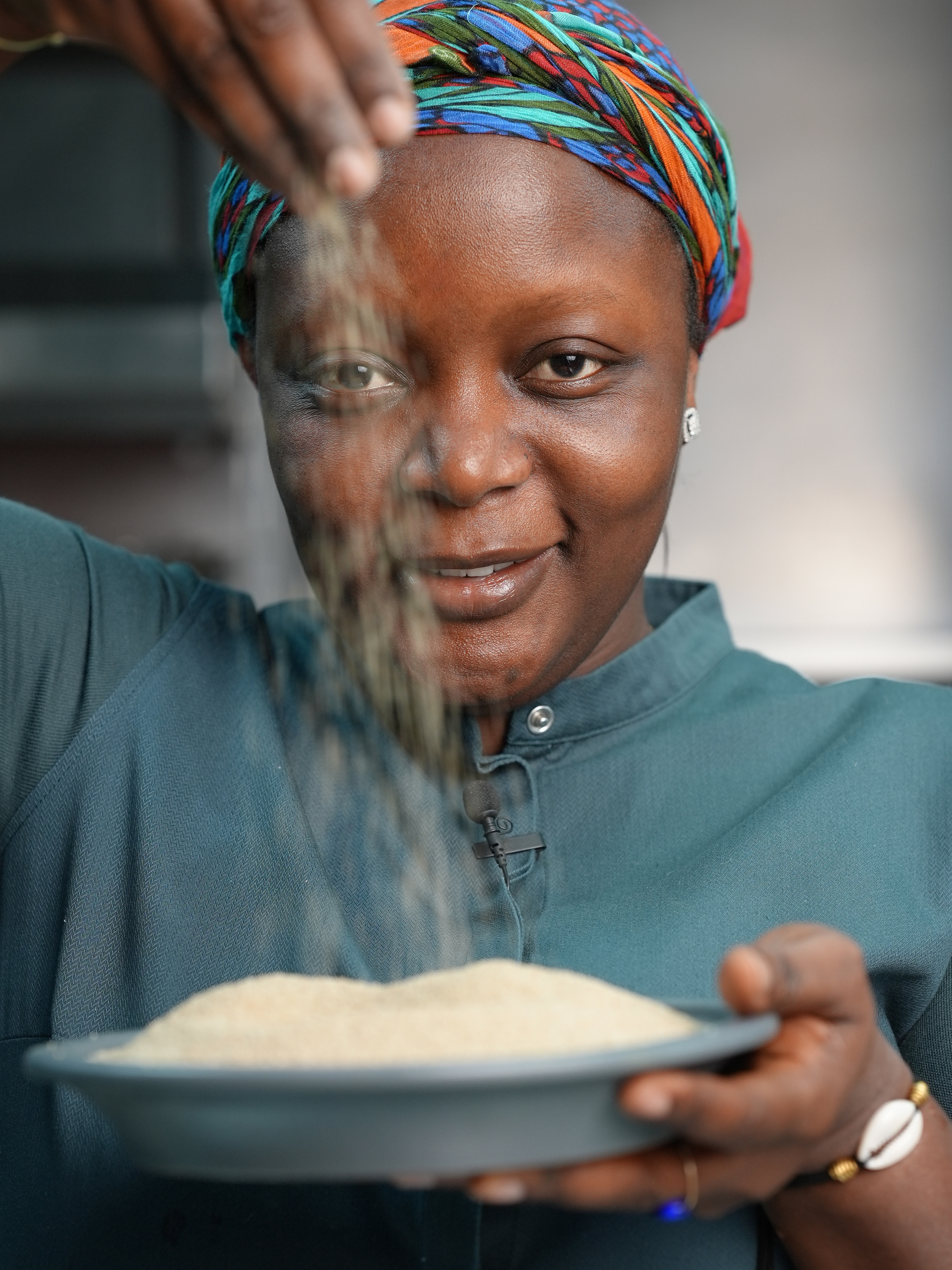
- Binta in 2025
- Born: July 24, 1984 (age 42); Freetown, Sierra Leone
- Education: Boma International Hospitality College
- Occupation: Chef
- Known for: Founder of Dine on a Mat
- Awards: Rising Star Award (2021), Basque Culinary World Prize (2022)

Fatmata Binta (born July 24, 1984) is a Sierra Leonean chef, food systems advocate, and cultural ambassador based in Accra, Ghana, whose work has established her as one of the foremost global voices for the preservation and celebration of Fulani culinary heritage. She is the recipient of the 2022 Basque Culinary World Prize, the first African chef to receive the honor and serves as the Food and Agriculture Organization's (FAO) Regional Goodwill Ambassador for Africa.

== Early life ==
Binta was born in Freetown, Sierra Leone, in 1984, to first-generation Fulani parents of Guinean descent from Fouta Djallon, Conakry. Her mother ran a shop which sold fried street food. Between the ages of seven and nine, Binta lived with her grandmother, who operated a restaurant, where she assisted in the kitchen, an early immersion that would shape her lifelong relationship with food. Following the outbreak of the Sierra Leone Civil War, she and her family fled to Guinea alongside a community of approximately 200 people; it was in this crucible of displacement that Binta learned to produce food sustainably and from scratch.

== Education and early career ==
Binta studied international relations before working as a television host and English-language teacher in Madrid. After losing her tutoring position, she began preparing and selling sandwiches to students, a venture that ignited her determination to build a career in food. She went on to train at the culinary school of Boma International Hospitality College in Nairobi. Upon graduating, she entered the hospitality industry as an assistant chef, working between Nairobi and Accra, though she found the routine of conventional kitchen work unfulfilling and set her sights on a more independent path.

== Culinary career ==
In 2016, Binta founded Dine on a Mat, a nomadic pop-up restaurant concept that has since traveled to cities across Africa, North America, the Caribbean, and Europe, carrying Fulani cuisine onto some of the world's most prominent culinary stages. To build her repertoire, she journeyed across communities throughout Africa, working closely with local women to gather recipes passed down through generations. True to the principles of nomadism, the menu is reimagined at every stop, drawing on the ingredients and culinary traditions native to each location.

=== Advocacy and philanthropy ===
Binta's culinary work focuses on nomadic traditions, sustainability, and the preservation of Indigenous food systems. Through her pop-up dining initiative, Dine on a Mat, she presents the culture and history of the Fulani, a historically pastoral ethnic group spread across West Africa.

Binta advocates for traditional, land-based cooking practices, positioning them as models for environmental sustainability. Her work highlights the role of rural African women in maintaining regional food traditions. She also promotes the cultivation and consumption of underutilized indigenous crops most notably fonio emphasizing its drought resilience, nutritional profile, and potential to support local agricultural self-sufficiency.

=== Fulani Kitchen Foundation ===
In 2020, Binta established the Fulani Kitchen Foundation, a non-profit organization aimed at providing social, educational, and economic support to Fulani women. By 2022, the foundation reported that its initiatives had assisted over 300 families across 12 communities in four regions of Ghana.

== Awards and recognition ==
In 2021, Binta received the Rising Star Award at the Best Chef Awards. The following year, she was named the recipient of the Basque Culinary World Prize for her work with Dine on a Mat, becoming the first African to win the award. She allocated the accompanying €100,000 prize toward the construction of a community center in Daboya, Ghana, which provided threshing equipment and support for women farmers cultivating fonio.

Binta was appointed a Responsible Tourism Ambassador for UN Tourism, serving from 2023 to 2025. In 2023, she participated in the launch of the United Nations' International Year of Millets to promote fonio usage. In 2025, she was named a Regional Goodwill Ambassador for Africa by the Food and Agriculture Organization (FAO).
