= My Restaurant Rules =

- Genre: Reality Show
- Presented by: Curtis Stone (series 1); Ian Dickson (series 2)
- Judges: Patrick Collins; Caterina Borsato; Matt Moran
- Opening theme: "We Used to Be Friends" by The Dandy Warhols
- Country of origin: Australia
- Original language: English
- No. of seasons: 2
- No. of episodes: 63

Production
- Running time: 60 minutes (including commercials)
- Production company: Freehand Productions

Original release
- Network: Seven Network
- Release: 15 February 2004 – 29 May 2005

Related
- My Kitchen Rules; Restaurant Revolution; My Reno Rules

My Restaurant Rules is an Australian reality television series that aired on the Seven Network.

== Overview ==
The series pits five couples, each from Australia's five major cities, to compete against each other in opening a successful restaurant.

In initial episodes of the show the couples are given a vacated restaurant space in their home city that must be renovated. They also compete for additional money that can be used for renovation from a panel of judges based on a presentation of their mission statement and plan for their proposed restaurant. The judges also make further appearances later on in the series in both critiquing the restaurants and offering rewards to the contestants.

After a number of weeks the elimination process begins with the restaurants and their owners, reviewed and judged for nomination. The nominated restaurants then compete for votes from a phone poll, with the winner moving on and the loser being forced to shut down. This process continues until a single competing restaurant remains.

Despite the process of elimination that sees almost all competing restaurants shut down, every restaurant featured in the programme was successful and operated in the black. This is because the exposure the restaurants are given via the show. Moreover, some eliminated restaurants managed to re-open at new locations.

== Series 1 (2004) ==
The first series of My Restaurant Rules aired in 2004 and featured the five following restaurants and couples:

- Nick & Emily – The Red Sea, Adelaide
- Simon & Nathalie – My Little Kitchen, Brisbane
- Peter & Tayissa – Seven Stones, Melbourne
- Ash & Amanda – Room Nineteen, Perth
- Sam & Catherine – Cucina Vera, Sydney

In the series finale, Perth's Room Nineteen and owners Ash and Amanda were declared the winners, beating Peter and Tayissa of Melbourne's Seven Stones.

Series one was hosted by Curtis Stone.

=== Summary ===
- Brisbane succeeded in securing $300,000 worth of sponsorship which producers felt gave them an "unfair advantage". These sponsorship deals then had to be "shared" amongst their opposing teams.
- Sydney won the phone poll during renovations where they won $50,000. The losing teams each "won" $10,000.
- Sydney was the first to shut down against another strong restaurant, Perth. This was deemed to be a big surprise for both restaurants to be in the bottom two.
- Brisbane was the second restaurant to shut down against Perth again. (Although this elimination was showcased as the public's response to the phone poll, research later uncovered Brisbane was disqualified after failing to sign over ownership of their 'MYLK – my little kitchen' trademark.)
- Adelaide was the third restaurant to shut down against Perth and Melbourne. Many thought Melbourne would be the next to shut down.
- Melbourne was the last to shut down. Perth were declared the winners after being up for eviction every time.

== Series 2 (2005) ==
The second series of My Restaurant Rules aired in 2005 and featured the six following restaurants and couples:

- John & Justine – The Greedy Goose, Adelaide
- Todd & Francesca – Restaurant Louvre, Brisbane
- Dan & Rob – Two Words, Melbourne
- Andre & Sandy – Mint Leaf, Perth
- Evan & Bella – Pink Salt, Sydney
- Nathan & Georgia – Whisk, Melbourne

In the series finale, Adelaide's The Greedy Goose and owners John and Justine were declared the winners, beating Evan and Bella of Sydney's Pink Salt.

Series two was hosted by Ian Dickson.

=== Summary ===
- Adelaide won the first bank, winning $50,000. Melbourne and Perth were the worst, gaining $8,000 and $7,000 respectively.
- Brisbane won the second bank, winning $50,000.
- Nathan and Georgia are introduced to the couples as the secret sixth couple. It is announced that the first restaurant to be eliminated will not be shut down, but instead taken over by them.
- The five restaurants were critiqued by the judges when they arrived by surprise. The criteria or their assessment were service (10pts.), atmosphere (10pts.), and food (20ts.) Two Words and The Mint Leaf scored the lowest, and faced the public vote.
- Two Words and The Mint Leaf faced the public vote to decide which restaurant would be taken over by Nathan and Georgia. Two Words received many of their elimination votes from Victorian numbers (each state had separate voting lines, to make the competition fair). This suggests that Victorian fans, believe that Nathan and Georgia would be better management for their local restaurant, and increase their chances of winning. Two Words was transformed into Whisk by Nathan and Georgia.
- The five restaurants are reviewed by a secret judge, who was a professional restaurant critic, unknown to the couples until after his visit, he used the same scoring system as the judges, except he had one extra criterion, which was "Wow! Factor" (2pts.) He scored The Mint Leaf lowest, followed by Restaurant Lourve, and Whisk in equal second to last.
- Perth was the first to shut down against Brisbane and Melbourne.
- The female half of each remaining partnership visited all four of the restaurants together. When visiting Adelaide, Franchesca refused to drink local water, and instead only from her bottle.
- Upon their return to their home city, each female contestant ranked the other three restaurants in order from best to worst in the categories, service, atmosphere, and food. Pink Salt, and Restaurant Lourve had the lowest final rankings. Controversy arose when Justine, Georgia and Bella were accused of 'ganging up' on Brisbane, by all ranking them lowly.
- Brisbane was the second restaurant to shut down against Sydney. This episode was known as The Big Chop, and the outcome was revealed on Channel 9's A Current Affair, before the screening of the episode on Channel 7.
- The final assessment was done by the judges, on the original criteria, and their visit was expected and announced. One of the judges was upset by Pink Salt's "cheeky" waitress Anna, and subsequently, gave them a low service score. Ultimately, Pink Salt ended up in the bottom two restaurants to face the public vote for potential elimination, and were joined by Whisk.
- Melbourne was the third restaurant to shut down against Sydney.
- Both Pink Salt, and The Greedy Goose faced the final public vote, as they were the last remaining restaurants. This marked Pink Salt's third time facing the public vote, more than any other restaurant for the season (falling short of Room Nineteen's record of four elimination survivals, and eventual win in season one). Adelaide faced the public vote for the first time, and were believed to be disadvantaged in that they were inexperienced in promoting themselves. They used The Giant Rocking Horse in Gumeracha, and the Giant Orange to hold banners for their support.
- Sydney was the fourth to shut down against Adelaide. Adelaide were declared the winners.

== After the show ==
In 2005, series 1 winners Ash and Amanda of Room Nineteen discovered that the site that had been allocated to them by Seven was booked to be demolished in December. They were unable to sell the restaurant due to a clause in a contract they signed and the cost of moving the restaurant to another location was too high, so Room Nineteen closed its doors in June 2005. Interestingly, the building that housed Room Nineteen has not been demolished to this day (January 2010).

In contrast, the series 2 winning restaurant The Greedy Goose continued to stay in business for four years after the show. However, in February 2009, they declared that they would be closing up business after an unsuccessful attempt to open a second restaurant in the beachside suburb of Glenelg. The poor performance of the second restaurant focusing on gourmet hamburgers and the 'harsh economic times' put the winning couple into a position, they couldn't recover from.

In addition, despite Sydney's defeat in series 2, contestants Evan and Bella of Pink Salt opened a new restaurant with the same name on 22 March 2006, at a new location in Double Bay from the original suburb of Manly. They were featured as one of the best restaurants in Australia. The new restaurant also includes a cocktail bar and is currently having more success than it did on the television series.

Evan bought Bella's share of the business in 2011. Pink Salt in Double Bay has been operating since 2005 and Evan now runs Pink Salt on his own. In October 2014, Evan temporarily closed Pink Salt for a complete renovation, new concept, new style of food and with a new team. The restaurant has received great reviews and this new Pink Salt seems to be thriving. The Sunday telegraph reviewer rated the restaurant very highly. Apart from Pink Salt, none of the other restaurants in series 1 or 2 are still operating.

== Possible reboot ==
In 2010, the Seven Network considered reviving the format to cash in on the success of Network Ten's MasterChef Australia. This came in the form of the My Kitchen Rules series. In 2015, Seven produced a new restaurant reality show, known as Restaurant Revolution, which lasted only one season.

== International versions ==
=== Belgium ===
vtm started broadcasting Mijn Restaurant (My Restaurant) on 4 March 2008. The show is presented by Rani De Coninck. Five couples started their own restaurant in Leuven, Ghent, Hasselt, Antwerp or Ostend. The jury consists of the famous Belgian chef Peter Goossens, the head editor of the culinary magazine "Ambiance" Dirk De Prins and the General Manager of a hotel Christel Cabanier. Leuven won this season.

vtm started broadcasting the second season of "Mijn Restaurant"("My Restaurant") on 3 March 2009. Restaurant "Dell'Anno" (Kortrijk) with Claudio and Gaëlle won. As after winning they started renovating earlier than the counsel allowed them, works were put on hold. November the restaurant opened again. As it is such a success, no closingdays. "Bigarreaux" (Sint Truiden) with Tom and Ann were runner-up. They have recently opened a new restaurant.

The series aired for 4 consecutive seasons till 2011 and was followed up in 2014 by serie 'Mijn Pop-uprestaurant' till 2017. Similar to Restaurant Revolution the restaurants in this reality serie were constructed out of shipping containers.

=== Germany ===
Mein Restaurant (My Restaurant), began airing on 10 October 2008, with subsequent episodes airing every Tuesday and Friday at 20:15. The series premiered on VOX with five couples from Munich, Cologne, Berlin, Hamburg and Leipzig. The Munich team from the "Grinsekatze" restaurant won the first and only season contest.

=== Netherlands ===
The first season of Mijn Tent is Top (My Shed is Best) started on 18 January 2007. The winners of the first season was "Coquille" in Den Bosch. The second season was aired in 2008 and "Flinstering" in Breda was the big winner. In 2009, "De Pastinaeck" in Amersfoort won this third season. RTL 4 broadcast the series and it was presented by Herman den Blijker.

=== New Zealand ===
The first season of My Restaurant Rules NZ will start on 30 September 2019 and finish on 29 October 2019. Collin Fasnidge from My Kitchen Rules NZ and New Zealand chef/restaurateur, and founder/former owner/executive chef of Soul Bar, Judith Tabron serve as judges.

Each local suburban or countryside restaurant's paired teams consist of the head chef and front of house manager. One or both of which would be the owner as well, but in round one, both would be cooking without the rest of the brigade.

This version will see the teams ordering from each team's menus in its original state, with the lowest-scoring team being eliminated, before being given NZ$20,000 and 72 hours to renovate the restaurants.

In round 2, the judging panel will include a pair of local restaurateurs and local press writers. The renovation and new menu planning processes are not shown. The two lowest teams are eliminated until the top 2 teams enter the finals.

In the finals, the remaining two teams will compete in a public 3-course set menu dinner service from a with 30 guests, served by the respective wait staff, but only cooked by the contestants, while all eliminated contestants return in the judging panel.

Like My Kitchen Rules NZ, the primary sponsor is Harvey Norman.

=== United Kingdom ===
A series with a similar format entitled "The Restaurant" in the UK first aired on BBC Two in 2007. A group of couples compete for the chance to set up a restaurant financially backed and personally supported by French chef Raymond Blanc. The winning couple are given their own restaurant to run, in Oxfordshire, near to Blanc's own Le Manoir aux Quat' Saisons. The series aired for 3 seasons.

== Rules franchise ==
This is the first series in Seven Network’s Rules franchise, following this series came My Kitchen Rules in 2010, followed by House Rules in 2013 and My Reno Rules set to air in 2026.

Series	Seasons	Format	Original airdates
My Restaurant Rules	2	Cooking	15 February 2004 – 29 May 2005
My Kitchen Rules	15	Cooking	1 February 2010 – present
House Rules	8	Renovation	14 May 2013 – 7 June 2020
My Reno Rules	1	Renovation	21 April 2026

== See also ==
- List of Australian television series
- List of Seven Network programs
