= Pharmacy (restaurants) =

Restaurant in London, England

Coordinates: 51°30′32″N 0°11′58″W

Pharmacy was a restaurant in Notting Hill, London, which opened in 1997. It was succeeded by Pharmacy 2, which also closed. The venture was backed by Damien Hirst and public relations specialist Matthew Freud.

== Name dispute ==
It gained further publicity thanks to a dispute with the Royal Pharmaceutical Society of Great Britain which claimed that the name as well as the pill bottles and medical items on display could potentually confuse people looking for a real pharmacy. The name itself was breaching the Medicines Act 1968, which restricts the use of the term "pharmacy". The restaurant's name was subsequently changed to "Army Chap", and then later "Achy Ramp", both of which are anagrams of "Pharmacy".

== Closure ==
Initial plans to open further restaurants outside London were quietly dropped and the restaurant itself closed in September 2003.

Hirst, who had only loaned the restaurant the artwork on display on the premises, went on to earn over £11 million when the items were auctioned at Sotheby's. The restaurant's artwork was celebrated in a 2011 exhibition in Leeds Art Gallery.

== Revival ==
On 26 February 2016 Hirst opened his Pharmacy 2 restaurant inside his Newport Street Gallery in Vauxhall, a conversion of 1913 theatrical workshops into a free public art gallery. It closed after a year.
