= Mondragon University =

University in the Basque Country, Spain

- Mondragon Unibertsitatea
- Type: Private, cooperative
- Established: 1997
- Affiliations: Mondragon Corporation
- Rector: Vicente Atxa
- Faculty: 400
- Students: 6,713 (2022–2023)
- Undergraduates: 2500
- Postgraduates: 300
- Doctoral students: 50
- Location: Mondragón, Spain; 43.06176°N 2.49662°W
- Campus: Nine locations: Mondragón, Ordizia, Hernani, Oñati, Irun, Eskoriatza, Aretxabaleta, San Sebastián and Bilbao.
- Website: www.mondragon.edu

Mondragon University (Basque: Mondragon Unibertsitatea, MU) is a non-profit cooperative private university in the Basque Country, officially established and recognised in 1997. It is part of the Mondragon Corporation. Its main campus is in Mondragón, Gipuzkoa.

== History ==
The institution first originated as the Escuela Politécnica Superior, a polytechnic school established by José María Arizmendiarrieta in 1943 that was open to young people in the region.

The current university was formed in 1997 through the association of three existing educational cooperatives tied to the Mondragon Corporation: Mondragon Goi Eskola Politeknikoa “Jose Mª Arizmendiarrieta” S. Coop., ETEO S. Coop., and Irakasle Eskola S. Coop. Before 1997, these three educational cooperatives were affiliated with the University of the Basque Country. The new entity was set up as a non-profit cooperative university, an unprecedented organizational structure in the Spanish landscape of private universities at the time, with the aim of creating a university "close to the needs of businesses". The new university was officially recognized by the Basque Parliament on 30 May 1997.

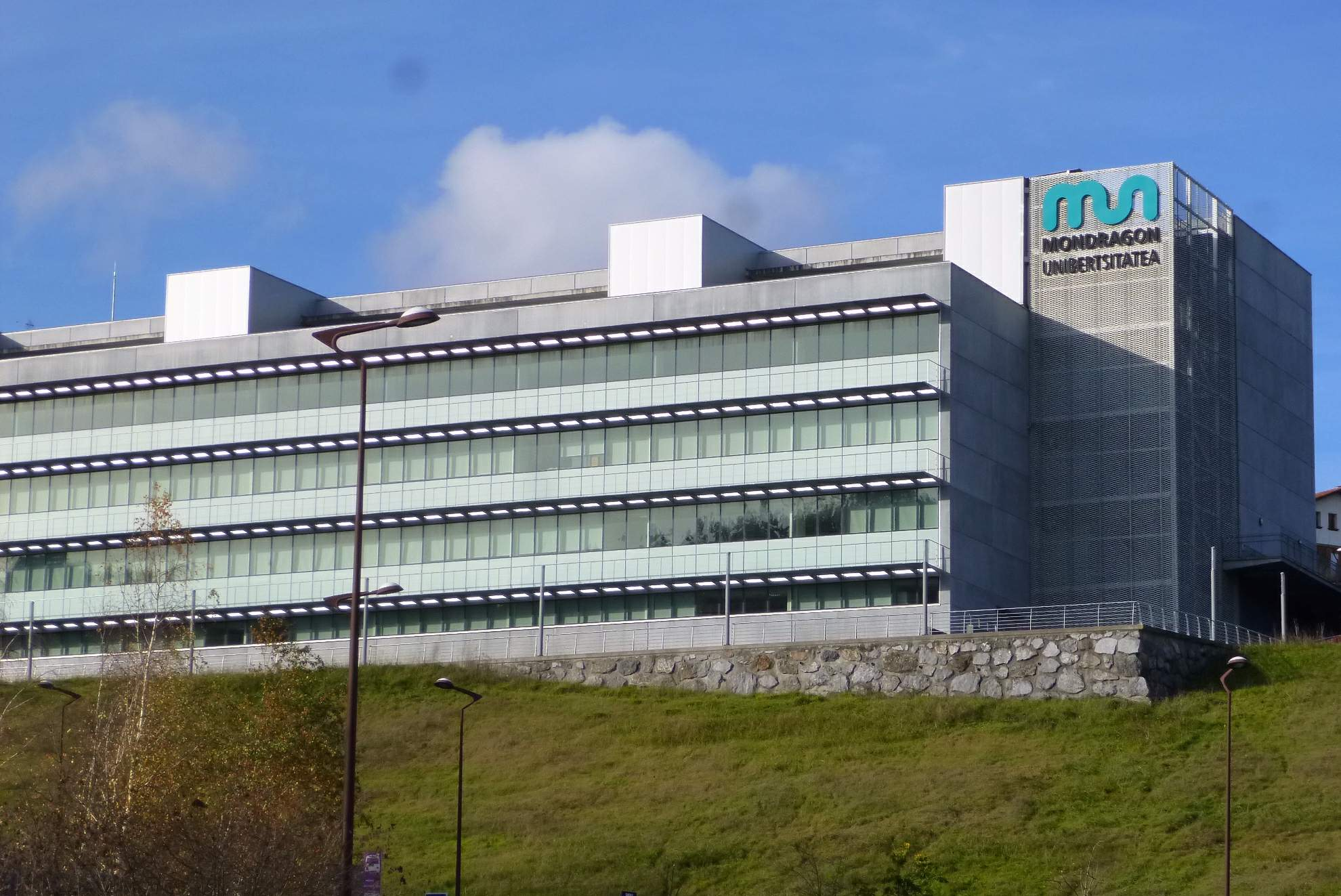
Garaia building of the Faculty of Engineering, in Mondragón.

== Faculties ==
Mondragon University has four faculties:

- Faculty of Humanities and Education Sciences
- Faculty of Business Studies
- Faculty of Engineering
- Faculty of Gastronomic Sciences

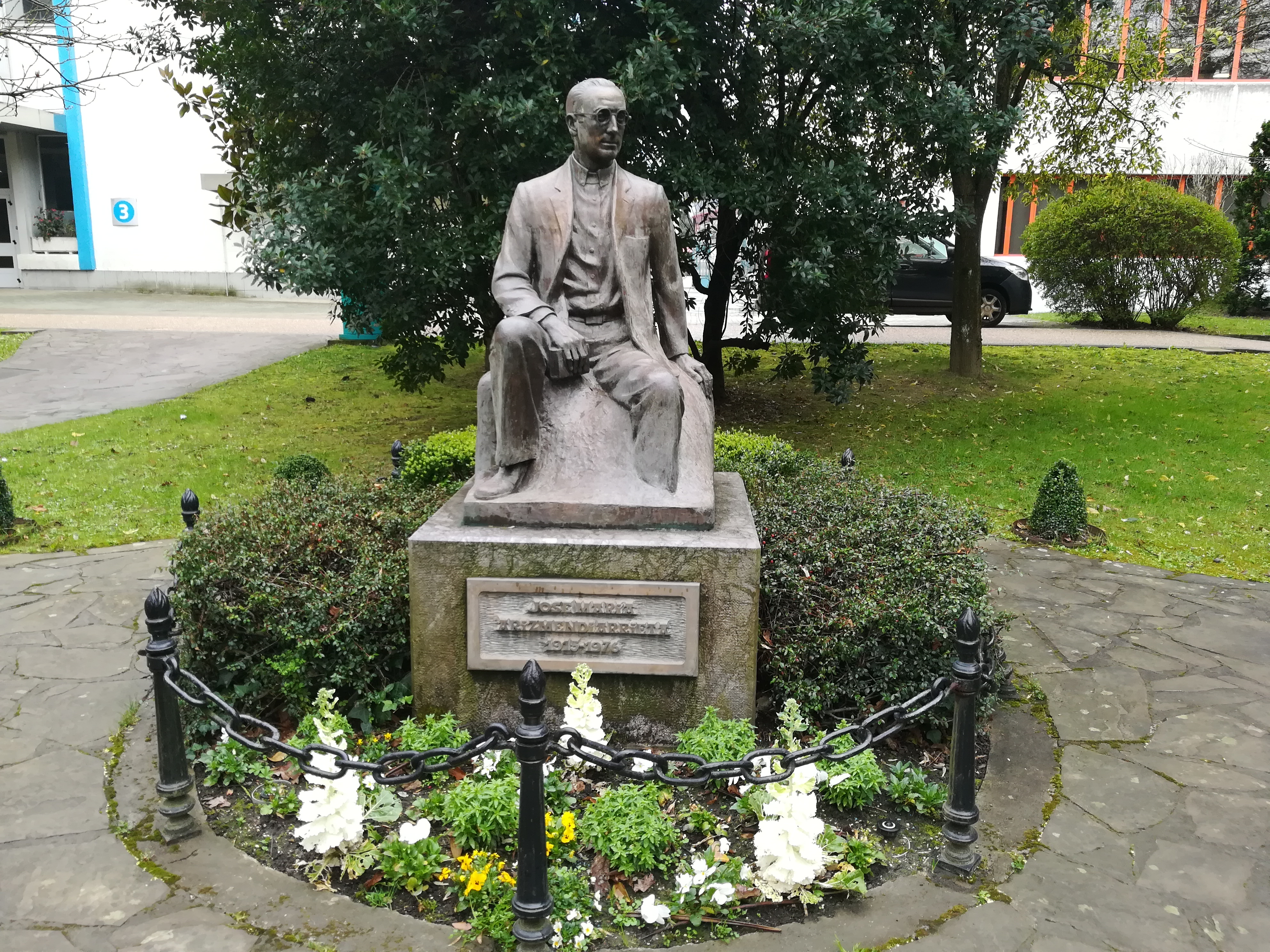
José María Arizmendiarrieta memorial at the Mondragón campus
