= Simon Bryant (chef) =

Australian chef

- Bryant at Tasting Australia, 2023
- Born: 14 February 1965 (age 61); Exeter, Devon, England
- Culinary career
- Television shows
- Beat the Chef; The Cook and the Chef
- Awards
- 2007 Hotel Management Magazine Awards for Excellence – Executive Chef of the Year; 2008 Restaurant and Catering Association (SA) – Chef of the Year
- Website: me.simonbryant.com.au

Simon Bryant (born 14 February 1965, Exeter, Devon, England) is an Australian chef, television presenter, author and food advocate. He is best known for co-presenting the ABC television series The Cook and the Chef with Maggie Beer and for his long association with Tasting Australia.

Before entering hospitality, Bryant trained and worked as a motor mechanic. He later spent more than a decade at Hilton Adelaide, becoming executive chef, before moving into television, publishing, catering, major food events, a low intervention farmgate wholefood/ wholesale food service supply business and food advocacy.

His more recent professional work has included the co-development of a portable commercial kitchen business, bringing together his experience in mechanical systems, professional kitchens, catering and large-scale food events.

== Early career and transition into hospitality ==
- Before entering the hospitality industry, Bryant trained and worked as a motor mechanic.
- He later returned to undergraduate study enrolling in a B Economics at The University of Adelaide before a career change and entering professional cooking, initially working in Thai and Indian restaurants in Melbourne.
- Bryant subsequently returned to Adelaide and joined Hilton Adelaide, where he worked at The Grange under chef Cheong Liew. He progressed through a number of kitchen roles before becoming executive chef of the hotel.
- His early mechanical career remained separate from his public culinary career for many years, but has become relevant to his later work involving portable commercial kitchen infrastructure and equipment.

== Culinary Career ==
Bryant spent more than a decade at Hilton Adelaide.

During his time at the hotel, he worked at The Grange alongside Cheong Liew before progressing through senior kitchen positions and eventually becoming executive chef.

As executive chef, Bryant was responsible for Hilton Adelaide’s restaurant and broader food operations, giving him experience across professional kitchen operations, catering and food service.

Following his departure from Hilton Adelaide, Bryant continued working as a chef while expanding into catering, television, publishing, food events and other projects.

His approach to cooking has placed an emphasis on produce, sourcing and simplicity. Bryant has advocated for ethically sourced ingredients, local and seasonal produce and greater recognition of growers and producers.

== Television ==
- Bryant became widely known through the ABC television series The Cook and the Chef, which he co-presented with Maggie Beer.
- Beginning in 2006, the program brought together Bryant’s professional culinary background and Beer’s experience as a self-taught cook and food producer. It explored seasonal ingredients, Australian produce and different approaches to cooking.
- Bryant and Beer presented more than 150 episodes across four series before the program concluded in 2009.

== Tasting Australia and food events ==
Bryant has had a long association with Tasting Australia, South Australia’s major food and beverage festival.

He joined the festival’s creative leadership from 2014 and held senior roles across multiple editions of the event, including as creative director ( 2014, 2016, 2017) , site caterer and festival director (2018, 2019, 2020, 2022)

His work with Tasting Australia involved the development and delivery of food experiences involving chefs, producers, venues and temporary event infrastructure, while promoting South Australian produce and the state’s food and beverage industry.

In 2021, after eight years in the festival’s creative leadership, Bryant stepped down from the festival director role and became Patron of Tasting Australia.

His work in festivals, catering and food events subsequently formed part of his move into projects involving temporary and portable commercial kitchen infrastructure.

== Portable commercial kitchens ==
Bryant has more recently expanded his professional work into portable commercial kitchen hire for temporary food preparation and execution for events, catering operations, renovations and situations where permanent commercial kitchen facilities are unavailable or impractical.

The venture draws on two areas of his professional background: his early training and experience as a motor mechanic and his later career operating and working within professional kitchens, catering environments and large-scale food events.

Bryant’s involvement includes the practical application of his understanding of commercial kitchen workflows and equipment alongside his earlier mechanical experience.

== Food advocacy and philanthropy ==
Alongside his commercial and culinary work, Bryant has been involved in food-related advocacy and charitable initiatives, particularly in food access, ethical sourcing, animal welfare and community food support.

=== Hutt St Centre and food access ===
Bryant has had a longstanding association with Adelaide’s Hutt St Centre, which supports people experiencing or at risk of homelessness.

In 2008, while executive chef at Hilton Adelaide, Bryant was involved in efforts surrounding the donation of surplus hotel food to charitable organisations. Following changes providing greater legal protection for businesses donating food, Hilton Adelaide resumed providing surplus food for charitable use.

Bryant also participated personally in meal service at Hutt St Centre.

His involvement with the organisation has continued beyond his Hilton career, including regularly assisting in its Dining Room.

=== Animal welfare and ethical sourcing ===
Bryant has publicly advocated for improved animal welfare and greater consideration of the origins and production of food.

His involvement has included work with organisations and initiatives including Animals Asia Foundation and RSPCA Choose Wisely.

His food advocacy has also addressed ethical sourcing, environmental impact and the relationship between chefs, consumers and food producers.

=== Producers and sustainable food ===
Bryant has advocated for greater recognition of Australian growers and producers and for food sourcing that considers seasonality, production methods and environmental impact.

These themes have also featured throughout his work with Tasting Australia is broader involvement in South Australia’s food industry and his low intervention farmgate wholefood business which focus’ on plant forward protein.

== Not-for-profits and ambassadorships ==
Bryant’s charitable and advocacy associations have included:

- Hutt St Centre
- Animals Asia Foundation
- RSPCA Choose Wisely
- Oxfam food initiatives
- Animal Welfare League SA

His involvement has primarily related to food access, ethical food production, animal welfare and sustainability.

== Awards and presentations ==
- 2007 Executive Chef of the Year, Hotel Management Magazine Awards for Excellence
- 2008 Chef of the Year, Restaurant & Catering Association of South Australia
- 'Last Leaf' column in South Australian gourmet magazine Sumptuous.
- South Australian Ambassador for Earth Hour 2008 and 2009.
- WOMAD 2008 – Presented native Australian produce at 'Taste the World'
- Presenter at Department of Environment and Heritage 'Reclaim the Food' Chain event
- Ambassador for the Animal Welfare League and official Food Ambassador for Animals Asia
- Campaigned for legislative change enabling Food Donor Laws to be changed – Hilton Adelaide now donates all unsold food to the Hutt Street Centre for the homeless daily
- First South Australian business to gain RSPCA Choose Wisely accreditation
- Botanic Gardens Foundation Kitchen Garden Ambassador
- 2014 Adelaide Food Legend, The Advertiser Food Awards

== Publishing ==
- Vegies and Vegies
- Grains & Other Good Stuff
