= Basque Culinary Center =

Spanish culinary foundation

Coordinates: 43.28825°N 1.98714°W

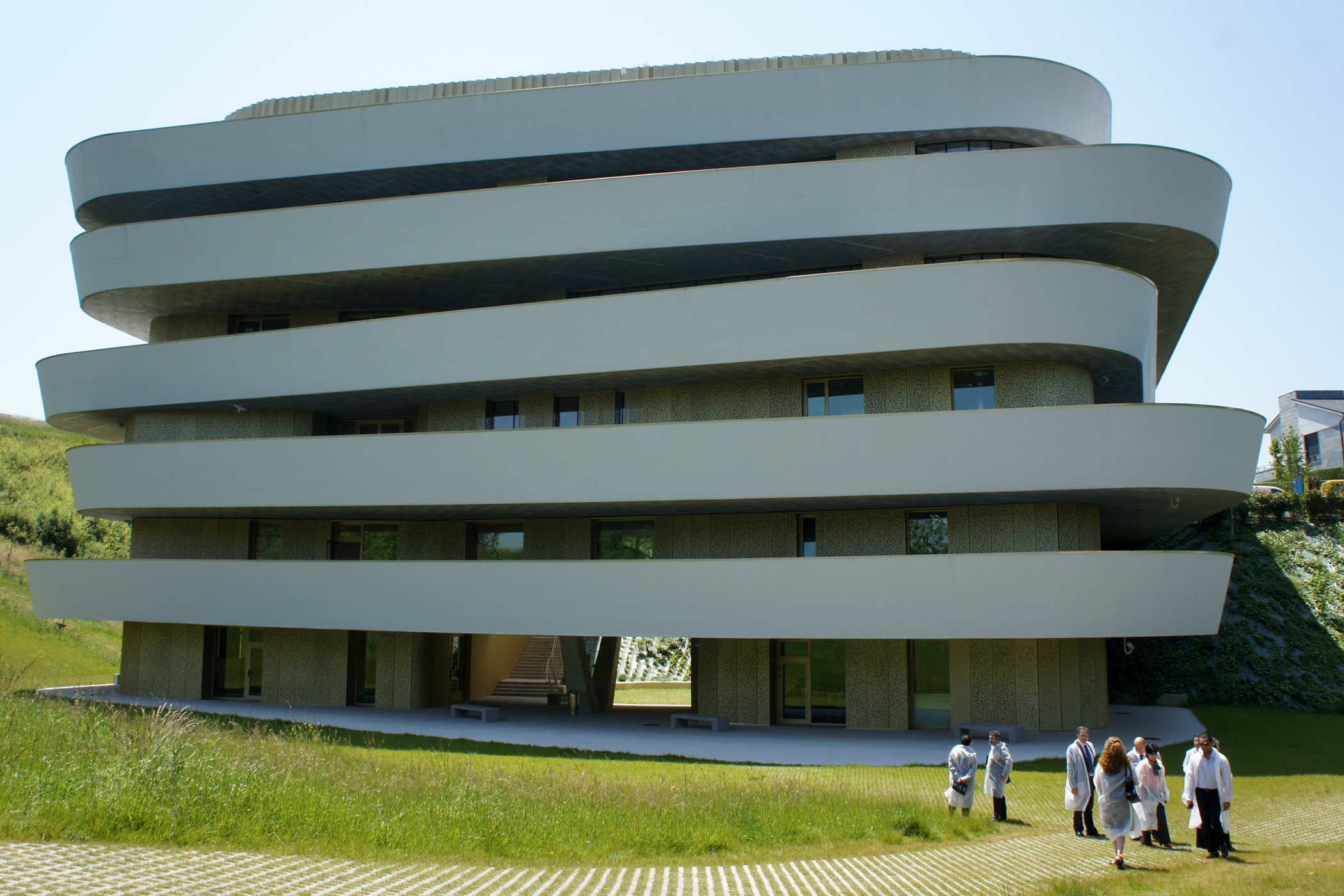
Basque Culinary Center campus in San Sebastián

The Basque Culinary Center, based in San Sebastián, in the Basque region of Spain, is a culinary foundation created in 2009 by Mondragon University and a group of prominent Basque chefs as a training, research and innovation project, aimed at developing the culinary sector, with the idea of relating cooking with management, science and other disciplines.

The Basque Culinary Center consists of two lines of work: the Faculty of Gastronomic Sciences within Mondragon University, the first to offer official university-level training in the gastronomy sector in Spain, and a Research and Innovation Centre in the field of food and gastronomy. The institution's campus was inaugurated in October 2011.

== Organization and structure ==
=== Board ===
The board of the Basque Culinary Center foundation is made up of the chefs who played an active role in launching the initiative and continue to be closely linked to the project (among them Juan Mari Arzak, Martin Berasategui, Pedro Subijana, Karlos Arguiñano, Andoni Luis Aduriz, Hilario Arbelaitz and Eneko Atxa); institutions in the knowledge sector, Mondragon University and the AZTI-Tecnalia technology centre; public bodies including the Basque Government, the Provincial Council of Gipuzkoa and the City Council of San Sebastián; and leading companies in the food and drinks industry: Fagor, Eroski, Martiko, Heineken, Covap, Pernod Ricard-Domecq Bodegas and D.O. La Rioja.

The BCC also has an international advisory staff on business administration and management, including people as Adela Balderas.

=== International Advisory Committee ===
The Basque Culinary Center foundation also has an International Advisory Committee, chaired by Ferran Adrià and made up of some prominent international chefs. Among them are Yukio Hattori (Japan), Massimo Bottura (Italy), Michel Bras (France), Dan Barber (United States), Gastón Acurio (Peru), Alex Atala (Brazil), Heston Blumenthal (United Kingdom) and René Redzepi (Denmark). The purpose of this body is to advise the board of the Faculty of Gastronomic Sciences and the Research and Innovation Centre on strategic matters, and to raise the international profile of the Basque Culinary Center.

This group of top chefs met in San Sebastián in July 2010, to set up the International Advisory Committee. There they held their first work day to discuss key issues for the international gastronomic sector and culinary training for the professionals of the 21st century. In September 2011 the Committee held its second meeting in Lima, Peru. This produced a body of work and reflections set down in the document "Open Letter to the Chefs of the Future". A year later, the chefs held their third meeting in Tokyo, Japan, where they assessed the progress of modern cooking, the interdisciplinary nature of the chef's profession and the use of information technology. The committee has held further annual meetings in New York City, United States (2013), São Paulo, Brazil (2014), San Sebastián (2015 and 2016), and Mexico City, Mexico (2017).

== Faculty of Gastronomic Sciences ==
The Faculty of Gastronomic Sciences of the Basque Culinary Center is a part of Mondragon University, which in itself represented a milestone: the inclusion of culinary training in a university setting. Prior to the launch of this project, there was no official university-level training in the gastronomy sector on offer in Spain, and the only precedent in Europe was the University of Gastronomic Sciences in Italy. After the establishment of the Basque Culinary Center, other universities in Spain, namely the University of Barcelona and the University of Valencia, included official degrees on gastronomy.

The faculty offers a degree in gastronomy and culinary arts, postgraduate programmes, and different programmes for professionals and gastronomy enthusiasts.

As of 2015, 50% of the faculty's students are international, 25% in the case of the university degree.

=== Degree in gastronomy and culinary arts ===
The degree in gastronomy and culinary arts is an official four-year university degree, adapted to the European Higher Education Area.

The degree is based on five broad areas of knowledge, with the aim of guaranteeing an up-to-date training for professionals in the sector: cooking, service, management, science and culture. The Basque Culinary Center's gastronomy and culinary arts degree programme aims to assure a comprehensive training for professionals in the gastronomic sector so that, in the future, they are able to work in areas like the kitchen and the dining room, but also in industry, research or business management. Right from the first year, students combine theory and practice in the kitchen, dining room and management areas.

The first promotion of 59 students graduated in July 2015.

=== Postgraduate programmes ===
In addition to the degree in gastronomy and culinary arts, the Faculty of Gastronomic Sciences at the Basque Culinary Center also offers postgraduate programmes which differentiate between kitchen specialists and those from other sectors who aim to specialise in the field of gastronomy, as well as a doctorate programme. These include:

- Master's degree in teacher training in gastronomy
- Master's degree in gastronomic journalism and communication
- Master's degree in the management and design of gastronomy tourism experiences
- Master's degree in sommelier studies and enomarketing
- Master's degree in food and beverage management
- Master's degree in restaurant innovation and management
- Master's degree in advanced cookery
- Master's degree in restaurant pastry and sweet cuisine
- Master's degree in cooking: technique, product and creativity
- Master's degree in gastronomic sciences
- Doctorate programme in gastronomic sciences

=== Programmes for gastronomy enthusiasts ===
In addition to the training programmes for professionals, the Basque Culinary Center offers a range of courses for gastronomy enthusiasts.

The centre carries on these activities through the BCulinary Club, set up as a space for gastronomy enthusiasts, featuring talks, courses, cookery classes and recipes.

Furthermore, the Basque Culinary Center organises BCulinary Udan, a summer gastronomy camp for teenagers aged from 14 to 17.

== Food and Gastronomy Research and Innovation Centre ==
Alongside the Faculty of Gastronomic Sciences, the Basque Culinary Center has the Food and Gastronomy Research and Innovation Centre.

Its purpose is to generate new scientific knowledge and innovative products in the culinary sphere, including food, hotels and gastronomy. This means that the areas of knowledge involved in the sector can be expanded with new knowledge which can generate new products, new services and new businesses. Experimentation and research goes on at this centre using a multidisciplinary approach with the aim of achieving advances in the following areas, among others:

- Research, development and innovation (RDI): The research work done at this centre aims to give greater added value to current products and services, in order to foster their differentiation on the market and encourage the creation of new businesses, products and services in the areas of food, HORECA, healthcare, healthy nutrition, social innovation in ageing and tourism, among others.
- Quality: Regaining the concept of gastronomy, a sense of pleasure and the importance of quality labels are declared priorities for this centre, as is the need to raise awareness in the culinary sector and in society in general of the importance of quality and authenticity. These ideas aim to improve performance in the sector and encourage more sophisticated, demanding customers. This line of work in raising awareness among the population also aims to improve results in terms of preventing health risks.
- Synergies and cooperation: The existence of a specific centre linked to gastronomy intends to generate synergies and new areas of cooperation with other technology centres, especially Azti-Tecnalia and CSIC, the Spanish National Research Council, and European centres and universities, as well as with companies in the sector. In practice, new areas of research and work emerge, so that technology transfer can enrich projects.

== Cafeteria ==
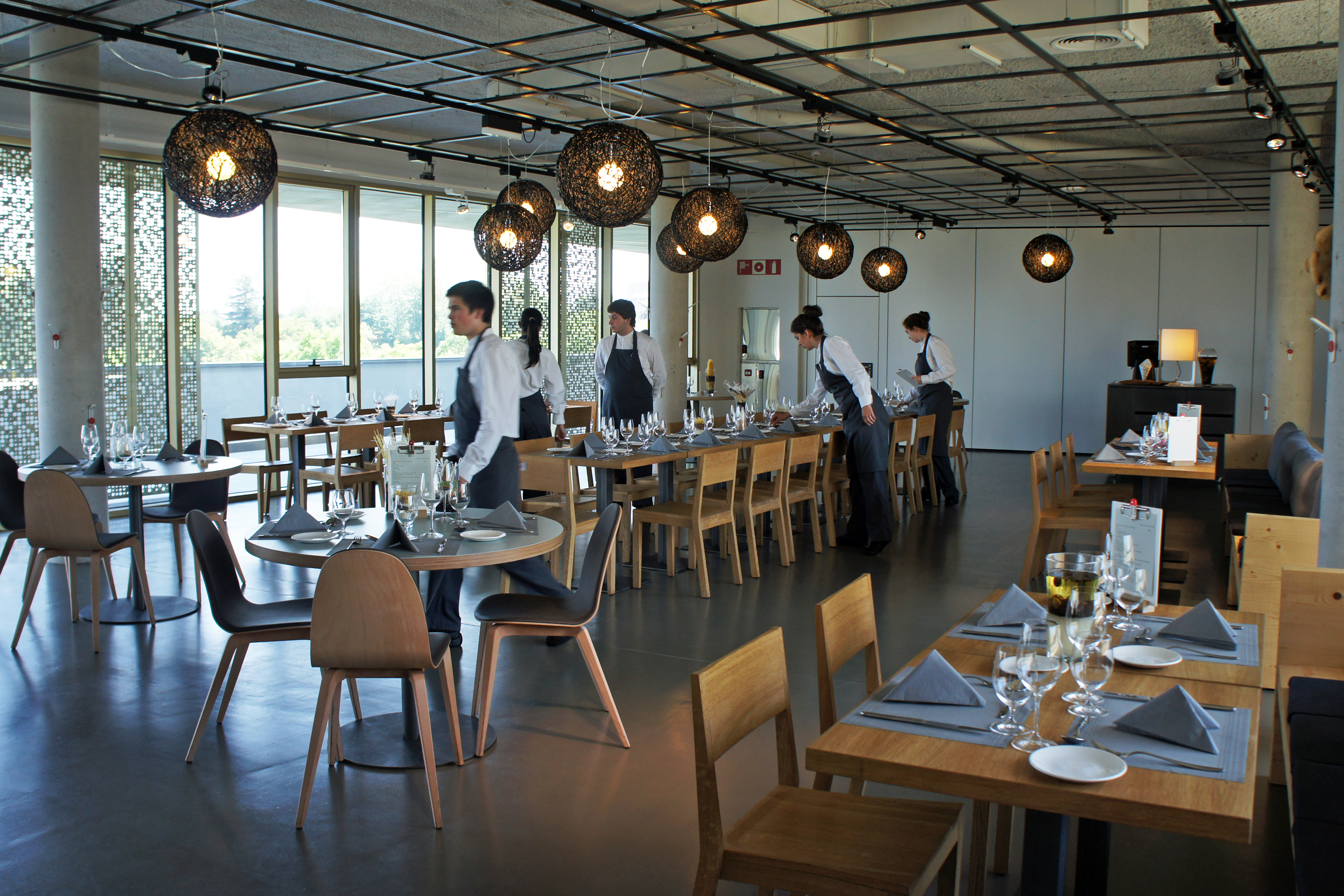
Basque Culinary Center cafeteria

The centre has a cafeteria, which in practice functions as the training workshop for students on the degree in gastronomy and culinary arts, where they can put what they learn in class into practice with real customers, in both the kitchen and the dining room. This cafeteria is open to the public and serves two meals per day.

== Future expansions ==
=== Gastronomy Open Ecosystem (GOe) ===
The Basque Culinary Center is set to complete work on a new building for innovation and research in the Gros district of San Sebastián in the summer of 2025. The new building, named Gastronomy Open Ecosystem (GOe), will include eight kitchens, a sensory analysis room, ten laboratories including physical-chemical and microbiology rooms, a creativity workshop, an audiovisual production studio, coworking spaces, areas for companies, classrooms and multi-purpose kitchens, an auditorium, an experimental restaurant and a cant.

=== EDA Drinks & Wine Campus ===
The Basque Culinary Centre is leading the creation of a training, research and innovation campus for the beverage and wine industry in the province of Álava, named EDA Drinks & Wine Campus. The campus will have two locations: one focused on wine in the town of Laguardia, in the Rioja Alavesa wine region, and the other on other beverages in the city of Vitoria-Gasteiz.
