= List of The Living Room (TV series) episodes =

The Living Room is an Australian lifestyle program that is a quadruple winner of the Logie Award for Most Popular Lifestyle Program. The program delves into a range of lifestyle issues including renovations, travel, pet advice, cooking and also includes special guests and studio banter in each episode.

It premiered on Network Ten on 11 May 2012 and airs on Fridays at 7:30 pm.

== Series overview ==
Series	Episodes	Originally released	
Series	Episodes	First released	Last released
1	30	11 May 2012	30 November 2012
2	40	15 February 2013	29 November 2013
3	40	14 February 2014	28 November 2014
4	42	13 February 2015	27 November 2015
5	42	12 February 2016	25 November 2016
6	43	10 February 2017	1 December 2017
7	43	9 February 2018	30 November 2018
8	40	29 March 2019	20 December 2019
9	25	3 July 2020	18 December 2020
10	30	26 March 2021	10 September 2021
Special		20 December 2019	24 December 2020
11	30	8 April 2022	25 November 2022

== Episodes ==
=== Series 1 (2012) ===
No. overall	No. in season	Episodes	Original release date
1	1	Episode 1	11 May 2012
2	2	Episode 2	18 May 2012
3	3	Episode 3	25 May 2012
4	4	Episode 4	1 June 2012
5	5	Episode 5	8 June 2012
6	6	Episode 6	15 June 2012
7	7	Episode 7	22 June 2012
8	8	Episode 8	29 June 2012
9	9	Episode 9	6 July 2012
10	10	Episode 10	13 July 2012
11	11	Episode 11	20 July 2012
12	12	Episode 12	27 July 2012
13	13	Episode 13	3 August 2012
14	14	Episode 14	10 August 2012
15	15	Episode 15	17 August 2012
Chris finds himself a free holiday on board a 38 foot yacht; meanwhile Miguel finds himself in a race against the clock, to cook up 3 courses to please everyone.
16	16	Episode 16	24 August 2012
Chris heads to Falls Creek, Australia’s only true ski-in, ski-out alpine resort; Miguel is off to Mudgee; and Amanda drops in on one of Australia’s most popular broadcasters, Indira Naidoo.
17	17	Episode 17	31 August 2012
Chris arrives at Thunderbird Park to road-test some of the activities on offer; meanwhile Barry works with a budget of 7,000 dollars to give an out-dated BBQ area a 1960's inspired revamp.
18	18	Episode 18	7 September 2012
19	19	Episode 19	14 September 2012
In our first ever Design Challenge, Baz is pitched head to head against interior designer, James Treble; meanwhile Miguel and Amanda team up to create an Elvis-inspired dinner party.
20	20	Episode 20	21 September 2012
This week, Chris heads to the United Arab Emirates capital to find out more about the lives of its local feathered friends; meanwhile Miguel heads to Sydney’s slice of gelato heaven, Gelato Messina.
21	21	Episode 21	28 September 2012
To celebrate the launch of the new FIFA 13 video game, EA Sports gave Barry 20,000 dollars to create the ultimate clubhouse for 1 lucky family; meanwhile Elmo and Cookie Monster play sous-chef with Mr Miguel.
22	22	Episode 22	5 October 2012
23	23	Episode 23	12 October 2012
Miguel gets served a side of humour with his hotdog this week by fun-loving mates Liam and Dave, owners of Melbourne’s Massive Wieners; meanwhile, Amanda pops in to visit Hollywood starlet Nicky Whelan.
24	24	Episode 24	19 October 2012
Chris is donning a backpack and a pair of hiking boots this week, and taking a walk on the wild side at Arkaba Station in the South Australian Flinders Ranges; meanwhile Miguel heads to Petersham.
25	25	Episode 25	26 October 2012
On Vanuatu’s Tanna Island, Chris gets to visit an active volcano but first he needs to get some courage and advice a black magic chief. Later Amanda meets Aussie violinist Sally Cooper.
26	26	Episode 26	2 November 2012
In another jam-packed episode, Chris travels to Abu Dhabi, Miguel heads for the Adelaide hills, Amanda barges in on Charlotte Dawson’s home and Brendan Moar teaches Baz how to grow plants up a wall.
27	27	Episode 27	9 November 2012
28	28	Episode 28	16 November 2012
Miguel cooks with what he finds in a busy mum’s pantry, Chris gets up close and personal with an Oryx, Amanda drops in on Charlie Pickering and Baz revamps a 1970's apartment.
29	29	Episode 29	23 November 2012
In tonight’s new episode, Chris heads to Vanuatu, Miguel visits MC contestant Marion in SA, Baz has 3k to renovate an investment property and Amanda stops over at Charli Robinson’s home.
30	30	Episode 30	30 November 2012
Chris heads to SA’s Cooper Pedy; Miguel meets up with the king of Melbourne coffee, Salvatore Malatesta; and Barry revamps four unfinished home projects in one weekend for only 3k.

=== Series 2 (2013) ===
No. overall	No. in season	Episodes	Original release date
31	1	Episode 1	15 February 2013
32	2	Episode 2	22 February 2013
33	3	Episode 3	1 March 2013
34	4	Episode 4	8 March 2013
Tonight; Amanda is at MasterChef Australia judge Matt Preston's house, Miguel hunts mud crabs in the mangroves, and Dr Chris meets some miniature performing poodles.
35	5	Episode 5	15 March 2013
36	6	Episode 6	22 March 2013
Miguel and James Treble turn a family's home into a prehistoric feast; Amanda visits Peter Garrett's house in Sydney; Baz renovates a kitchen and Chris meets Anna, a confused cat.
37	7	Episode 7	12 April 2013
With great advice on food, travel, celebrity, renovation, gardening and money stories, Amanda Keller, Chris Brown, Miguel Maestre and Barry du Bois dish up another huge serving of The Living Room.
38	8	Episode 8	19 April 2013
Rebel Wilson drops into the studio & Amanda Keller gets the lowdown on life in Hollywood; Chris is headed to The Cook Islands on a mission to find a rare bird, but gets more than he bargained for.
39	9	Episode 9	26 April 2013
In search of Melbourne's best sourdough, Miguel meets up with MasterChef Australia judge Gary Mehigan at the famous Convent Bakery & Baz checks out the stunning 60's home of design doyenne Karen McCartney.
40	10	Episode 10	3 May 2013
Amanda visits the modernist home of funny-man Tim Ross, who shares his love for all things '50s & '60s. Back on the couch, Chappo, from Bondi Rescue, introduces us to his high-spirited boxer Marley.
41	11	Episode 11	10 May 2013
Miguel visits Bilpin, a premier apple-growing region, for an apple pie bake-off with some of the town's best; Baz shows a husband how to wow his wife with a tile-free bathroom built in just four days.
42	12	Episode 12	17 May 2013
Amanda visits Megan Mullally's hotel room, she gets to know her new BFF & hears about her "pash & dash" with Rob Lowe. Meanwhile, Chris discovers a surprise tourist attraction in Shibu Onsen, Japan.
43	13	Episode 13	24 May 2013
Miguel meets a chicken farmer & creates his own take on Dr Suess’ Green Eggs & Ham; Chris is introduced to Lord Howe Island’s wildlife & learns they are as friendly as the locals.
44	14	Episode 14	31 May 2013
Amanda visits the Commando & she finds out more about the man behind the sunnies & tries to crack his tough façade; Baz calls in garden guru Lilly to help with a couple of reno-phobes.
45	15	Episode 15	7 June 2013
Chris is in for an out-of-this-world experience at the Robot Café, where 10-foot Fembots entertain and serve; Jason Cunningham tackles the mountain of debt Dental Assistant Georgie has racked up.
46	16	Episode 16	14 June 2013
Miguel meets Hangi master & chef Tom Loughlin at his property near Taupo and takes us through Maori cooking. Meanwhile, Steve Carell joins the team for a chat about his new movie, Despicable Me.
47	17	Episode 17	21 June 2013
Chris embarks on a journey through the centre of Japan’s pet paradise, Tokyo. Meanwhile, finance guru Jason Cunningham, is lending out his advice to a young couple looking at buying their first home.
48	18	Episode 18	28 June 2013
Oprah's amazing clutter guru Peter Walsh transforms the home and lives of two Living Roomers, Miguel gets busy in the kitchen with a pasta pro, while Chris takes a groovy step back in time in Melbourne.
49	19	Episode 19	5 July 2013
Dr Andrew Rochford explores the latest fitness fads to try to find the workout that fits him best. While shopping at Bunning's this week, an un-suspecting couple get more than they bargained for with Barry there to give them a hand.
50	20	Episode 20	12 July 2013
Amanda meets Lisa McCune at one of her favourite haunts and together they indulge in the thespian life; Chris answers a call from a confused pet owner whose weaned kitten has begun suckling on their male dog!
51	21	Episode 21	19 July 2013
Chris Brown heads to Cape Range National Park to meet the pier's head of security, a 200-kilo groper fish; Dr Andrew Rochford shows us how best to survive the cold and flu war zone this winter.
52	22	Episode 22	26 July 2013
Amanda visits the home of critically acclaimed, Silver Logie Award winner, Rob Carlton. Also, Miguel meets up with a chef named Raj from Melbourne's famous Indian restaurant Bhoj, to talk spice and all things nice!
53	23	Episode 23	2 August 2013
On TLR tonight, Oprah's organising guru Peter Walsh throws a lifeline to a couple consumed by clutter; Miguel cooks the Italian classic, Fettucini Carbonara and can Chris Brown keep his whites white at the world's most colourful fun run?
54	24	Episode 24	9 August 2013
On The Living Room this week, Barry ambushes a hopeless hubby in Bunnings and teaches him DIY tricks of the trade. Chef Miguel makes magic with wild forest mushrooms, and Amanda matches wits with board game collecting comedian Tommy Dean.
55	25	Episode 25	16 August 2013
Tonight on TLR, Dr. Andrew has tips for beating the winter blues; Miguel shows us the secret to making Bangers and Mash to die for; renovation expert Cherie Barber helps a first time renovator make big bucks with a tiny studio conversion.
56	26	Episode 26	23 August 2013
Tonight on TLR, MasterChef Australia judge George Calombaris shares a salad recipe that's a slimmer's secret, how to create a designer nursery on a budget and everything you need to know to live large in retirement. Plus special guest Kerri-Anne Kennerley.
57	27	Episode 27	30 August 2013
Tonight on TLR, we've got your dad covered. Win the ultimate Man Cave Home Theatre, plus Barry shows you how to build one, Miguel faces 3 rib masters in a BBQ show down and Chris promises four dads the time of their lives in a monster 4WD.
58	28	Episode 28	6 September 2013
On TLR tonight, taking the roar out of your snore with Dr Andrew Rochford, how to make big bucks with a front facade reno that costs only six thousand dollars, and Miguel has the only sticky date pudding recipe you'll ever need to know.
59	29	Episode 29	13 September 2013
Lilly shows you how to green your walls; Miguel heads to the mountains to cook his catch with an amazing trout recipe; Chris explores Australia's untouched wilderness in The Kimberly; we visit Marina Prior's Melbourne home.
60	30	Episode 30	20 September 2013
This week on TLR, one lucky lady takes Barry home for some DIY 101; Miguel turbocharges a kid's birthday party; Chris finds three ways to kill three hours in the stunning Cook Islands; check out a robot collection that's out of this world.
61	31	Episode 31	27 September 2013
Tonight on TLR, we get up close and personal with South Africa's Big Five on safari; tips on how to renovate and organise the engine room of your house, the laundry; go inside the home of the infamous Mr Paparazzi himself, Darryn Llyons.
62	32	Episode 32	4 October 2013
This week on TLR, go cage diving with Great Whites in South Africa's Shark Alley; how to create a chocolate dessert to die for; how to make your entrance hall the best room in your house; tips on avoiding Sexually Transmitted Debt.
63	33	Episode 33	11 October 2013
Tonight on TLR, how to make a big impact in your small backyard; Chris and Miguel set sail on their first ever cruise; Dr Andrew Rochford makes a meal of the TLR team as he attempts to find out why some people are mozzie magnets.
64	34	Episode 34	18 October 2013
We show you how to flip the layout of your home around to increase its value with our Renovating for Profit expert, Cherie; Amanda meets up with Country music superstar Beccy Cole; Chris Brown comes face to face with a trained alligator.
65	35	Episode 35	25 October 2013
We show you how to solve Australia's biggest backyard blunder, Chris and Miguel cruise to the Isle of Pines, Miguel shows you how to make restaurant quality fish and chips at home and the Wonderland cast drops by for a chat.
66	36	Episode 36	1 November 2013
This week on The Living Room, Chris and Miguel go road tripping in South Africa's beautiful Cape Town, Barry uses his expert eye to overhaul a tired old kitchen and Amanda checks out the home of The Bachelor Australia host, Osher Günsberg.
67	37	Episode 37	8 November 2013
Barry & James face off in a recycling design challenge that could save you money; Miguel & the Healthy Chef dish up a power-packed breakfast to fuel your workouts; Dr Andrew Rochford uncovers the reasons we stack on the kilos when we eat.
68	38	Episode 38	15 November 2013
On TLR, Miguel takes on Melbourne's queens of street food with a lemongrass chicken burger that your family will love; Barry updates your flatpack furniture with a weekend project for under $50; Chris treks to Kenya for the Maasai Marathon.
69	39	Episode 39	22 November 2013
Miguel is in New Zealand whipping up a simple BBQ Scallop dish to die for; Chris finds a waterfall in WA where the water flows sideways; Amanda visits stage and screen star Rob Mills where they bust a move in his living room.
70	40	Episode 40	29 November 2013
This Christmas The Living Room has you covered with a 90-minute extravaganza of festive recipes, craft projects and decorating ideas. Plus, Adam Gilchrist, Ben Stiller and Kristen Wiig chat to the team.

=== Series 3 (2014) ===
No. overall	No. in season	Episodes	Original release date
71	1	Episode 1	14 February 2014
The Living Room is back in 2014 and returning to Friday nights are audience favourites Amanda Keller, Chris Brown, Miguel Maestre and Barry Du Bois - and this year they will be introducing some new faces to The Living Room family.
72	2	Episode 2	21 February 2014
Tonight on TLR, Barry's DIY for dummies, Gary Mehigan cooks the perfect steak, Dr Chris falls in love with Borneo's cutest orphans - baby Orangutans and we unveil the boom suburbs to buy in now!
73	3	Episode 3	28 February 2014
Tonight on TLR, Oprah's declutter guru Peter Walsh is back to help a hoarding mum get her life back. Australia's hottest supermodel, Robyn Lawley, has Miguel flipping out in the kitchen and Chris takes a running jump off a tall building.
74	4	Episode 4	7 March 2014
Tonight on TLR, Amanda climbs the harbour bridge with Paula Abdul, Dr. Chris Brown chats to Robert Irwin about his life living at Australia Zoo & Miguel shows us some different ways to make a jaffle.
75	5	Episode 5	14 March 2014
Tonight on TLR, mind and body expert Leanne Hall investigates body image, our new veggie gurus Matt and Fab get the garden growing and Miguel sends Chris on a wild goose chase through Borneo.
76	6	Episode 6	21 March 2014
Tonight on TLR, we transform a tired kitchen for just a grand, Miguel makes Barramundi and Mango sing in a dish, Amanda meets acclaimed actress Susie Porter and Chris has a day to remember in Brisbane.
77	7	Episode 7	28 March 2014
Barry discovers Australia's most unique beach house; Miguel makes 2 healthy recipes using popcorn, dark chocolate & yoghurt; Leanne reveals the truth about 3 of the most popular kid's snacks.
78	8	Episode 8	4 April 2014
Oprah's king of de-clutter Peter Walsh is back; Chris saves a frightened fido from thunder and lightning; veggie patch Mat shows you how to water well; Miguel bakes the eggs you'll want for brunch this weekend.
79	9	Episode 9	11 April 2014
Chris joins a pod of dolphins; Miguel feeds a crew of yachtsmen for under $5; Barry has two designer looks for your home office; Amanda finds her inner pinup at the home of a fifties collector.
80	10	Episode 10	18 April 2014
Leanne investigates the health benefits of chocolate; Miguel's making Easter eggs with pastry king Adriano Zumbo; James has some kid's Easter crafts; Barry tackles a bathroom reno for under $2.5K.
81	11	Episode 11	25 April 2014
On TLR, two home office makeovers with ideas to steal; a dolphin swim where you become one of the pod; Amanda meets a woman who lives life like it's 1950; Miguel feeds a hungry crew for just $5.
82	12	Episode 12	2 May 2014
Chris is on Kangaroo Island to hunt down the elusive and stunning leafy sea dragon; Baz helps out Paula and Mike in their DIY horror house; Amanda catches up with swimming legend Susie Maroney.
83	13	Episode 13	9 May 2014
Chris indulges three lucky Mums with 'high' tea indulgence at the Sydney Trapeze School. Meanwhile, Miguel takes part in a Mother's Day scone bake-off and Barry presents a very special family with a brand new living room.
84	14	Episode 14	16 May 2014
Tonight on TLR, behind the scenes at the Lion King, great ideas to do over your dining room, veggie recipes your kids will love and secret cameras reveal what your pets get up to when you're not home.
85	15	Episode 15	23 May 2014
Hugh Jackman makes Amanda's dreams come true, Barry turns a clutzy couple into DIY dynamos, Miguel's winter warming veggie curry and Chris jumps from 14000 feet straight into the Great Barrier Reef!
86	16	Episode 16	30 May 2014
On TLR, the secret to a healthy sex life after kids, an old school pudding recipe that's cheap and easy, an underwater experience in Hawaii you'll never forget and hot veggie tips for the cold months.
87	17	Episode 17	6 June 2014
How to give your home a facelift that will look a million bucks; Chris helps a sea turtle hatchling make his first big swim; Miguel makes the perfect pork roast; Amanda drops in on Kate Waterhouse.
88	18	Episode 18	13 June 2014
89	19	Episode 19	20 June 2014
90	20	Episode 20	27 June 2014
91	21	Episode 21	4 July 2014
92	22	Episode 22	11 July 2014
93	23	Episode 23	25 July 2014
94	24	Episode 24	1 August 2014
95	25	Episode 25	15 August 2014
96	26	Episode 26	22 August 2014
97	27	Episode 27	29 August 2014
98	28	Episode 28	6 September 2014
99	29	Episode 29	13 September 2014
100	30	Episode 30	20 September 2014
101	31	Episode 31	26 September 2014
102	32	Episode 32	3 October 2014
103	33	Episode 33	11 October 2014
104	34	Episode 34	18 October 2014
105	35	Episode 35	25 October 2014
106	36	Episode 36	1 November 2014
107	37	Episode 37	8 November 2014
108	38	Episode 38	14 November 2014
109	39	Episode 39	21 November 2014
110	40	Episode 40	28 November 2014

=== Series 4 (2015) ===
No. overall	No. in season	Episodes	Original release date
111	1	Episode 1	13 February 2015
112	2	Episode 2	20 February 2015
113	3	Episode 3	27 February 2015
114	4	Episode 4	6 March 2015
115	5	Episode 5	13 March 2015
116	6	Episode 6	20 March 2015
117	7	Episode 7	27 March 2015
118	8	Episode 8	3 April 2015
119	9	Episode 9	10 April 2015
120	10	Episode 10	17 April 2015
121	11	Episode 11	24 April 2015
122	12	Episode 12	1 May 2015
123	13	Episode 13	8 May 2015
124	14	Episode 14	15 May 2015
125	15	Episode 15	22 May 2015
126	16	Episode 16	28 May 2015
127	17	Episode 17	5 June 2015
128	18	Episode 18	12 June 2015
129	19	Episode 19	19 June 2015
130	20	Episode 20	26 June 2015
131	21	Episode 21	3 July 2015
132	22	Episode 22	10 July 2015
133	23	Episode 23	17 July 2015
134	24	Episode 24	24 July 2015
135	25	Episode 25	31 July 2015
136	26	Episode 26	7 August 2015
137	27	Episode 27	14 August 2015
138	28	Episode 28	21 August 2015
139	29	Episode 29	28 August 2015
140	30	Episode 30	4 September 2015
141	31	Episode 31	11 September 2015
142	32	Episode 32	18 September 2015
143	33	Episode 33	25 September 2015
144	34	Episode 34	2 October 2015
145	35	Episode 35	9 October 2015
146	36	Episode 36	16 October 2015
147	37	Episode 37	23 October 2015
148	38	Episode 38	30 October 2015
149	39	Episode 39	6 November 2015
150	40	Episode 40	13 November 2015
151	41	Episode 41	20 November 2015
152	42	Episode 42	27 November 2015

=== Series 5 (2016) ===
No. overall	No. in season	Episodes	Original release date	Viewers

=== Series 6 (2017) ===
No. overall	No. in season	Episodes	Original release date	Viewers

=== Series 9 (2020) ===
No. overall	No. in season	Episodes	"Guess That Gadget" Guest	Original release date	Viewers
323	1	Episode 1	Claire Hooper	3 July 2020	468,000
Amanda, Chris, Barry and Miguel return to Friday nights to serve up a multitude of uplifting and inspiring stories, with the guarantee of laughs along the way!
324	2	Episode 2	Ivan Aristeguieta	10 July 2020	423,000
Siblings Monica and Natalie are both health care workers who have been so busy helping others, it's time they get a little help themselves. Cue the fab four!
325	3	Episode 3	Marcia Hines	17 July 2020	418,000
After moving four times in five years, Michelle and Liam settled down in a time warp townhouse that's one big nod to this dope decade but their kitchen is in need of a time machine.
326	4	Episode 4	Jessica Rowe	24 July 2020	430,000
Amanda, Barry, Chris and Miguel set off to Lismore to pay a visit to the selfless carers at a local animal rescue centre which relies heavily on public donations.
327	5	Episode 5	Osher Günsberg	31 July 2020	373,000
Barry and Chris step up to the hotplate to create mouth-watering crispy miso salmon and symi prawns. Meanwhile, Miguel's off kitchen duty and into the bar as he serves up watermelon Margaritas.
328	6	Episode 6	Mark Humphries	7 August 2020	353,000
Amanda, Chris, Barry and Miguel step in to help an incredibly generous family who have dedicated their lives to "Supertees" a range of specially designed clothing for sick kids.
329	7	Episode 7	Cosentino	14 August 2020	377,000
The Slavin family run a community kitchen in Bondi that distributes food for disadvantaged people. Due to their popular service, their home is bursting at the seams so Barry steps in to help them to find some spare space. Miguel finds out more about the family's cooking while Chris learnt how to make kosher wine.
330	8	Episode 8	Harley Breen	21 August 2020	404,000
The Living Room goes on a road trip and takes a deep dive into the tiny home movement and explores the great benefits of going small, which includes smaller footprints, cheaper prices and flexibility to move wherever you choose. In this episode, Barry learns from wagon builder Leon who is building tiny houses, Chris and Miguel explore the lifestyle of living in a tiny house and visit Hayden's Pies Ulladulla, Miguel cooks a one-pan chicken pie and Amanda creates a vase in a local pottery studio.
331	9	Episode 9	Kate Peck	28 August 2020	384,000
It's Barry's 60th birthday! Mike Munro pays a visit to present the birthday boy with his very own This Is Your Birthday book and family and friends reminisce by sharing stories of what makes Baz so special. Miguel recreates the "swimming pool cake" from the iconic Australian Women's Weekly Children's Birthday Cake Book with creator Pamela Clark from The Australian Women's Weekly.
332	10	Episode 10	Jay Laga'aia	4 September 2020	409,000
For Father's Day, The Living Room is celebrating Dads, in all their dagginess. In this episode there'll be laughter, tears and plenty of eye roll-worthy Dad jokes. Miguel will show you how to cook the perfect steak and learn some pretty amazing garage storage ideas from Barry.
332	11	Episode 11	Adam Spencer	11 September 2020	355,000
Kabir might look like any other seven-year-old, but Kabir is gifted with an IQ of 142. In this science-filled episode, Barry creates a space-themed bedroom that will inspire Kabir in a rental property, Miguel discovers the future of Indian cuisine with chef Jessi Singh, Chris learns and tests UNSW Sunswift's solar car and Amanda learns about the benefits of traditional chai tea.
333	12	Episode 12	Beau Ryan	18 September 2020	349,000
Barry turns Lauren and Glen's bathroom from a non-functional mess into a little piece of luxury. Miguel whips up an oyster feast, Chris goes on a damp dark adventure exploring the wonderful world of glow worms and Amanda helps make face masks using fresh food ingredients.
334	13	Episode 13	James Mathison	25 September 2020	416,000
For years the Doyle family have been busy fostering children, raising their own 3 girls, and running two foster charities. Barry transforms their backyard into an entertaining oasis for the entire family, Amanda learns about Kelly's charity The Launchpad, which helps young adults transitioning from foster care to adulthood, Chris meets 11 year-old foster child Emma in his Bondi Junction Veterinary Hospital clinic and Miguel takes dad Glen on a teppanyaki barbecue bootcamp.
335	14	Episode 14	Gretel Killeen	2 October 2020	344,000
The boys embark on an epic declutter of Rick and Libby's home, which has become so overrun with rubbish that the downstairs of their home is unliveable. Also, Chris travels to Antarctica with Aurora expeditions to dive with a leopard seal and Miguel teams up with Spanish fine-dining chef Victor Moya to cook a mud crab risotto.
336	15	Episode 15	Ryan Fitzgerald	9 October 2020	301,000
Ian runs The Blind Chef restaurant and helps others with disabilities train in the world of hospitality. Ian has modernised the menu, but the restaurant is stuck in the past. Enter the fab four!
337	16	Episode 16	Brendan Jones	16 October 2020	266,000
The Living Room helps a small-town boxing gym bring physical and mental strength to the local community.
338	17	Episode 17	Susie Youssef	23 October 2020	406,000
Barry transforms a backyard into the ultimate outdoor living room for an ever-growing family. Plus, Miguel gives Amanda a lesson on how to use your leftovers more creatively.
339	18	Episode 18	Roz Kelly	30 October 2020	411,000
The Fab Four help out a woman named Amy & her son Will, who recently lost her husband. Barry creates an inviting space for her family and friends, Miguel bakes brownies with avocados; Leigh Sales reveals to Amanda how she dealt with life’s toughest trials and Chris discovers the healing power of horses, helping riding enthusiast Amy get back in the saddle of life.
340	19	Episode 19	Costa Georgiadis	6 November 2020	400,000
The Living Room helps the Walton family to become sustainable by turning their average Australian house into a shiny new, energy efficient, eco-home. Miguel cooks a ricotta and vegetable galette (or tart) using home-grown produce, Amanda learns about the need to get used to 'ugly-looking' food and Chris learns about the benefits of native bee-keeping.
341	20	Episode 20	Shannon Noll	13 November 2020	358,000
Sasha and Brian's horse riding business, Chesleigh Homestead, has taken a hit from both drought and the COVID-19 pandemic. Chris and Miguel, under the guidance of Barry, get to work on renovating an old cabin where the Cody family can get away from it all. Chris learns about the gold rush, Amanda learns how to whip and visits the ABC refinery to learn about the gold manufacturing process and Miguel cooks a flame grilled lamb montaditos.
342	21	Episode 21	Jan Fran	20 November 2020	384,000
Barry brings a 1950's Palm Springs design to Jakk and Bex's backyard, Miguel cooks up a vegan Mary's cauliflower burger and Chris gives the Australian White Ibis a much-needed makeover.
342	22	Episode 22	Julia Zemiro	27 November 2020	305,000
Barry turns an ex-funeral parlour into a bold, bright and inviting home, Miguel makes Italian dishes including pici pasta and poor man's parmesan, Amanda gets schooled on some scary, scaly animal friends and Chris learns about the life of longfin eels.
343	23	Episode 23	Gina Jeffreys	4 December 2020	292,000
In this Paddock to Plate special, the team celebrates Australian farmers and produce by visiting Leeton, in the Murrumbidgee. Miguel visits Webster Walnut Farm to make a walnut-crumbed pork fillet and waldorf salad, Barry carves a charcuterie board created using walnuts for a perfect mezze platter and Chris visits a local farm to see why a St. Bernard is stealing lambs.
344	24	Episode 24	Layne Beachley	11 December 2020	305,000
Baz visits the Biala Hostel, a Allambie Heights boarding house for indigenous girls, to help scrub up the bathrooms and transform an unused space into every teenage girl's dream. Miguel teaches the Biala girls how to make a berry citrus custard and Chris joins Kirsten Banks to learn about a Dreamtime story about an emu (or Gugurmin) that's found in the night sky.
345	25	Episode 25	Benjamin Law	18 December 2020	320,000
The Christmas spirit is in the air this week and the team drop in on the Trans! A delightful Vietnamese family who love to give back to the community, but now it's their turn. Barry and Miguel help revamp their cramped kitchen, dining and living room. Also, Chris finds out which fruits and vegetables reindeer actually prefer, Amanda joins Miguel to glaze a ham with a Vietnamese twist and Barry takes Dad, Paul, and his son Kelvin to find the perfect Christmas tree.

=== Series 10 (2021) ===
No. overall	No. in season	Episodes	Guest	Original release date	Viewers
346	1	Caravan & Camping	Martin Boetz	26 March 2021	332,000
The team meets the Pether family and their 40-year-old caravan, Peachy, who’s in desperate need of some care. Chris and Amanda go head-to-head in a four-wheel drive caravan reverse-off, Barry builds the ultimate camping companion, a portable DIY Hammock stand, Miguel whips up a healthy Mexican family feast while cooking outdoors and Chris pitches a tent on Queensland’s Fraser Island.
347	2	Easter special	Jethro and Anthony "Harries" Carroll	2 April 2021	250,000
In the Living Room's Easter special, the team helps the Theodorou family who have nowhere to celebrate their special time of year. Barry transforms the family's pergola into their ultimate entertaining space, Miguel shows dad Tim how to cook Hot choc buns from scratch and Chris meets with Lady Elliot Island ranger John "Meechy" Meech to learn about the nesting green sea turtles and to release some of their rescued hatchlings.
348	3	Creativity & Imagination	Em Rusciano and Peter Everett	9 April 2021	259,000
The team renovate the cluttered home of the Knowles, a family of singers and improvisors. Miguel's cooking skills are tested with former Ready Steady Cook presenter Peter Everett, Barry shows how to turn a used guitar into wall decor and Chris dives with dolphins to discover their creativity and learn how they communicate.
349	4	Colour	TBA	16 April 2021	309,000
Barry and Miguel meet the Charlesworths, a blended family who love the colour blue so much that they've decorated their whole house with it, with one glaring exception: the old, run-down and pink bathroom. Barry shows how to refurbish a bathroom and create a DIY wall niche, Amanda gets her hands dirty in a fingerpainting class, Chris visits Heron Island to learn about a world-first scientific breakthrough in the Coral Sea and Miguel creates a Moroccan inspired Rainbow Salad (Ensalada Arcoiris Marrogui).
350	5	Restaurants	Colin Fassnidge	23 April 2021	288,000
The team help family-run Afghani eatery Chápli Kebab in Blacktown, who are struggling to pay their rent after opening in 2019 just as the COVID-19 pandemic hit. Barry and Miguel step in with new branding and a makeover to lure in more patrons while Chris reunites with Tim Faulkner to re-introduce Tasmanian devils to mainland Australia for the first time in 3000 years. Miguel also learns how to cook Ashak (Afghan dumplings) from owner Sam.
351	6	Rental As Anything	TBA	30 April 2021	275,000
Meet Holly, a serial renter who has been so busy organising the Wagga Mardi Gras, she has had no time to focus on her own home. Miguel and Barry rejuvenate her rental property with semi-permanent DIY tips and tricks she can take with her when she moves on. Miguel cooks his version of a chiko roll for Holly, Chris joined tour guide Howie Dawson on a stay overnight at Mount Buffalo, Victoria in the highest cliff campground in the world and Amanda explores the endless possibilities of rentable products — from a bagpiper to bridal llamas and unicorns.
352	7	Mother's Day	Nikki Osborne	7 May 2021	300,000
In this Mother's Day special, the team celebrates by finishing a dream kitchen for the Brooks family after their renovations were brought to a grinding halt when their mum, Lou, died of cancer. Also, Amanda joins Nikki Osborne to play a game of Never Have I Ever, Chris visits Broughton Island to meet with ranger Suzanne Callaghan on a field trip to monitor wedge-tailed shearwater nests and, later, Miguel helps Amanda perfect her mum's favourite jam drops.
353	8	Alternative Menus	TBA	14 May 2021	287,000
This week, The Living Room helps Natasha Georgiadis, a talented mum who is having trouble getting her "Vegan Island" restaurant off the table at the local markets. Barry worked with 3PE Engineering to refurbish an old car trailer into a food truck and then created a wicking bed herb garden, Miguel shared dishes made from edible insects with the team and cooked up some vegan-friendly loaded sweet potato fries, while Chris visits Tasmania to learn about kelp forests from researcher Dr Cayne Laton of the University of Tasmania.
354	9	Upcycling	TBA	21 May 2021	312,000
The Living Room team meet Val and Brian Stewart to turn litter into glitter through upcycling! This couple from Camden run a charity, Mother Hubbard's Cupboard, which helps survivors of domestic violence and homelessness through selling upcycled items. Barry enlists Brian to work on upcycling an antique hall stand which he hopes to sell on auction day, Miguel cooks "Miguelito" lemon custard pastries using supermarket staples, Chris learns about the importance of upcycled living seawalls from Dr Marie Vozzo in Sydney Harbour and Amanda learns about kintsugi accessories from artists Hitsumi and Jun.
355	10	Declutter	Courtney Act	28 May 2021	313,000
The Living Room team enlist Birgit Cullen to help big-hearted local hero, Rosemary, to sort through years of accumulated clutter to reclaim some much-needed space in her garage. Courtney Act joins the team to participate in a declutter obstacle course competition, Miguel cooks an African spiced chicken with a potato and peanut curry before joining Chris to take a trip to Derby, Tasmania to ride on the Blue Derby Mountain Bike Trail before heading to the world's only floating sauna on Lake Derby.
356	11	Small Spaces	Chris Hadfield	4 June 2021	386,000
The team help Rajiv and Dee, a deserving young couple who've sacrificed everything to get their first foothold on the property ladder, transform their small apartment into something much roomier. Amanda asks astronaut Chris Hadfield on living in small spaces, Miguel discovers the secrets of the bento box at Sokyo with Chef Chase Kojima before making his own Tonkatsu Bento Box and Chris helps wildlife carer Peggy McDonald from the Higher Ground Raptor Centre release Archie, a barking boobook owl.
357	12	Pets	Mel Buttle	11 June 2021	371,000
Dr Chris is on the hunt to find the perfect pet for David and Marie Einstein and their three young girls, who are desperate to get a dog but are having trouble working out the best animal to suit their busy lifestyle. The team visit the Animal Welfare League to learn about dogs and participate in a poo cleaning challenge with Mel Buttle, Barry builds a dog bed and Miguel visits Deloraine, Tasmania to learn about canine companions who help track down the black truffle, which he used to cook a french omelette.
358	13	Episode 13	TBA	18 June 2021	317,000
The Living Room team gets luxurious as they meet selfless retirees Harry and Mari So, who have been so busy dedicating their lives to helping others, they've never been able to experience the finer things in life. While Barry helps transform their slippery, hazardous bathroom, Chris and Miguel take an extravagant getaway to Tasmania where they take a helicopter ride over the coastline, catch southern rock lobsters at Storm Bay to cook a lobster risotto and participate in a whisky blend showdown at the Shene Estate and Distillery.
359	14	Episode 14	Sandra Sully, Kate Peck, Sarah Harris and Angela Bishop	25 June 2021	355,000
Amanda visits an extraordinary shop The Social Outfit in Newtown that helps refugees and new migrant women get a foot in the fashion door in Australia. Inspired by the designers she meets, the team are enlisted to throw a fashion soiree to raise the charity's profile, with help from fashion stylist Deni Todorović and celebrity guests. Barry creates an ornate gold-leafed mirror to gift to the shop, Chris joins ranger John Bowden to visit Godfrey's Beach in Stanley, Tasmania to find the little penguin colony which nests in the graveyard at the base of The Nut and Miguel visits the Bread and Butter Project in Marrickville, which helps migrants and refugees train as bakers, to cook a custard bread and butter pudding and wagyu reubeun canapés.
360	15	Episode 15	TBA	2 July 2021	323,000
The Living Room helps charity Tribal Warrior turn the top deck of the Mari Nawi cruise boat into a top spot for viewing Sydney Harbour, Baz designs a driftwood-inspired table lamp and learns to screen print cushions with Indigenous artist Lucy Simpson, Miguel visits Clark Island to take barbecued snapper to a new level with warrigal greens and lemon myrtle and Chris explores seals at Kanowna Island and the beauty of Skull Rock, off the coast of the Mornington Peninsula.
361	16	Episode 16	TBA	9 July 2021	272,000
Baz meets Axel, a deaf toddler who has recently had a cochlear implant, to turn his family's muddy backyard into an interactive playground to help with his hearing development. Baz visits the Shepherd Centre, who teach parents how to interact and play with their deaf children, to understand the importance of play areas. Later, Miguel creates a chocolate fondant cake with Persian fairy floss and popping candy which engages all five senses, the team dine in the dark to heighten their senses and Miguel joins Chris on a trip to the Kakadu National Park in the Top End to unlock the secrets of the crocodile.
362	17	Episode 17	TBA	16 July 2021	358,000
The team heat things up by exploring a Scandinavian way of embracing the cold called 'hygge'. Loosely meaning 'warm and cosy', hygge is a way of getting the most out of life no matter how bad it is.
363	18	Episode 18	TBA	23 July 2021	357,000
This week Barry meets the Cann family, who are living a DIY nightmare! Miguel goes to Hong Kong, the home of street food, to learn the ancient art of noodle making from the Lau Sum Kee Noodle Restaurant and then joins Chris in Darwin, Northern Territory to admire street art and participate in a jet ski showdown.
364	19	Episode 19	TBA	13 August 2021	365,000
Barry meets Anna-Maria Unasa from Shalvey to help rebuild her overcrowded kitchen to better suit the needs of her big Samoan family. Later, Chris takes to the skies in a biplane on a "rock 'n' roll" themed adventure down the Great Ocean Road but not before visiting the twelve apostles to learn about erosion from geomorphologist David Kennedy. Miguel returns to Hong Kong to join food guide Silvana Leung in Hei Lee Bakery where he learns how to bake perfect custard tarts before joining Amanda back in the studio to cook a healthy egg white omelette.
365	20	Episode 20	Katie Robertson, Roy Joseph and Rodger Corser	20 August 2021	329,000
The team helps Julie Fuller, a middle-aged full-time worker, to revitalise her wardrobe and bring some inspiration to her one-bedroom apartment. While Barry upcycles a coffee table using bathroom tiles, fashion stylist Deni Todorović returns to help Julie bring some style and colour to her life. Later, Miguel joins Chris in Litchfield National Park to swim at Florence Falls and discovers Green Ant Gin with Ethical Adventures guide Rob Woods at Tabletop Swamp, which is used to cook a sweet corn and gin panna cotta.
366	21	Episode 21	TBA	27 August 2021	294,000
Barry meets the Bush family, who have recently welcomed their baby Charlie prematurely, to design and build a brand new alfresco area for their garden. Miguel visits the Riverina Region where he cooks a French classic, duck à l'orange with a sumo citrus and fennel salad, before joining Chris to compete in the Raw Challenge in Doyalson, New South Wales to settle their rivalry.
367	22	Episode 22	TBA	3 September 2021	311,000
Baz and Amanda meet the Turner family and their dad Garth, who has been an amputee for three years after he entered a coma from boarding a plane with a strep infection which caused sepsis and multiple organ failure. Barry helps transform their backyard to become a wheelchair accessible outdoor barbeque area to make their Father's Day one to remember. Later, Miguel visits Lennox Hastie at the Firedoor Restaurant to learn to cook a chargrilled woodfire steak, broccoli and leeks before joining Chris and Barry to participate in a go-kart racing and axe throwing competition.
368	23	Episode 23	TBA	10 September 2021	N/A
From '80s tragic to beachside magic, Barry transforms a childhood home stuck in the past into a modern coastal oasis. Then, Chris is on a quest to track one of Australia's most elusive predators.

=== Series 11 (2022) ===
No. overall	No. in season	Episodes	Guest	Original release date	Viewers
369	1	Episode 1	TBA	8 April 2022	N/A
370	2	Episode 2	TBA	15 April 2022	N/A
371	3	Episode 3	TBA	22 April 2022	N/A
372	4	Episode 4	TBA	29 April 2022	N/A
373	5	Episode 5	TBA	6 May 2022	N/A
374	6	Episode 6	TBA	13 May 2022	N/A
375	7	Episode 7	TBA	20 May 2022	N/A
376	8	Episode 8	TBA	27 May 2022	N/A

=== Specials ===
No. overall	No. in season	Episodes	Original release date	Viewers
82	1	Buster Special	1 May 2014	N/A
In this special episode of TLR - get ready to de-clutter! The Living Room's guru of organisation, Peter Walsh, is back with his biggest mission ever.
322	2	Xmas Special 2019	20 December 2019	359,000
346	3	Xmas Special 2020	24 December 2020	256,000
The halls are decked, the drinks are flowing and the turkey is in the oven. It's Christmas Eve at The Living Room!
