= List of celebrity guest appearances on Neighbours =

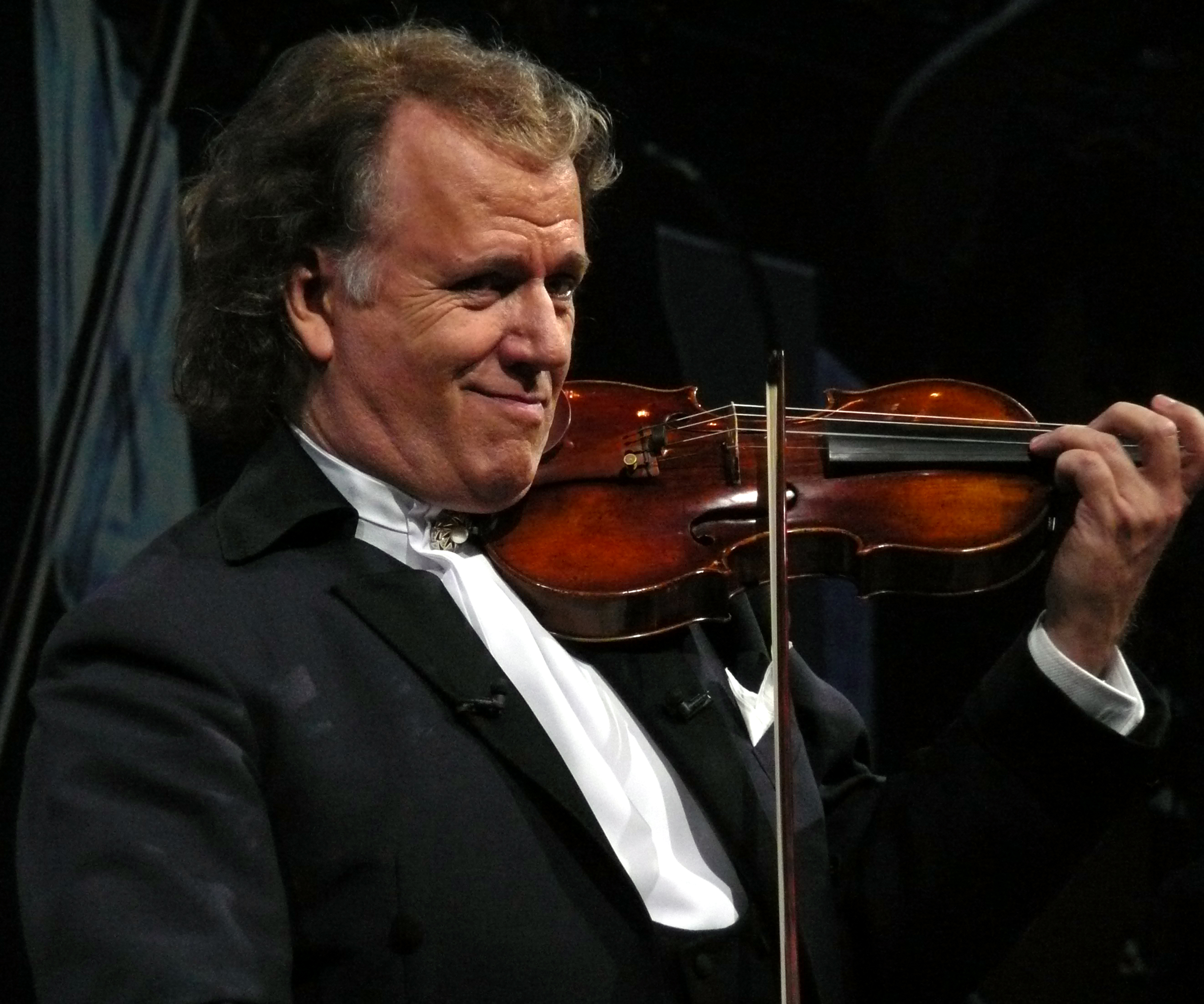
André Rieu's cameo in 2009 was named Neighbours' weirdest storyline by an online poll

Neighbours is an Australian television soap opera first broadcast on 18 March 1985. It was created by TV executive Reg Watson, who proposed the idea of making a show that focused on realistic stories and portrayed adults and teenagers who talk openly and solve their problems together. Neighbours has since become the longest-running series in Australian television and the seventh longest-running serial drama still on the air in the world. In 2005, the show was inducted into the Logie Hall of Fame.

The first celebrity to make a guest appearance in the show was former Skyhooks band member Red Symons. He made his on-screen debut ten days after the series began in March 1985. He played the role of Terry Inglis' ex-husband, Gordon. In 1986, record producer Molly Meldrum arrived in Ramsay Street to sign Charlene Mitchell (Kylie Minogue) after hearing her singing backing vocals on a music demo. Greg Fleet's appearance in 1988 saw him run over popular character Daphne Clarke (Elaine Smith) with his car, resulting in her death. 1995 saw Chris Lowe, one half of British music group, The Pet Shop Boys, appear and ask Helen Daniels (Anne Haddy) and Marlene Kratz (Moya O'Sullivan) for directions to a studio. A year later, writer Clive James had a walk on part as a postman. Australian cricketer, Shane Warne made a two episode appearance as himself in 2006. He came to Erinsborough to pick up a cheque for his charity from Harold Bishop (Ian Smith). Australian Idol presenter Andrew G made the first of three appearances by the show's stars in February 2007. Judges Marcia Hines and Ian Dickson followed in November 2007 and March 2009 respectively.

During three episodes set and filmed in London, a number of British stars filmed cameos, including Neil Morrissey, Emma Bunton, Julian Clary and Michael Parkinson. Morrissey was the only one of the group to play a character and not himself. British comedians Matt Lucas and David Walliams appeared as their characters, Lou and Andy and Tim Vine had a small walk on part as a lost tourist. Australian comedians Hamish & Andy made their Neighbours debut as radio hosts, Fred & Big Tommo and Lehmo had a cameo as himself in July 2010. The Charlie's bar set provides a stage for musicians to perform their songs during episodes. September 2008 saw girl band, The Veronicas sing their song, "This Love" on the set and Liverpudlian band, The Wombats sang three of their hits. Other singers and bands to appear at Charlie's, include Kate Ceberano, Ben Lee and former Australian Idol contestant Jacob Butler. AFL player Clint Bizzell began appearing as footballer Adam Clarke in a storyline that ran for just over a week in March 2009.

Dutch violinist André Rieu arrived in Ramsay Street in early April 2009. His cameo was later named Neighbours' "weirdest ever storyline" in an online poll. WWE wrestler Dave Batista signed up to appear in scenes with wrestling fans Callum Jones (Morgan Baker) and Toadfish Rebecchi (Ryan Moloney), during his promotional tour of Australia in June. In the same month, it was announced that British pop singer, Lily Allen, was to make an appearance and perform her new single "22" on the show. Allen was interviewed by Matthew Werkmeister's character, Zeke Kinski, at the Pirate Net radio station.

== Celebrity appearances ==
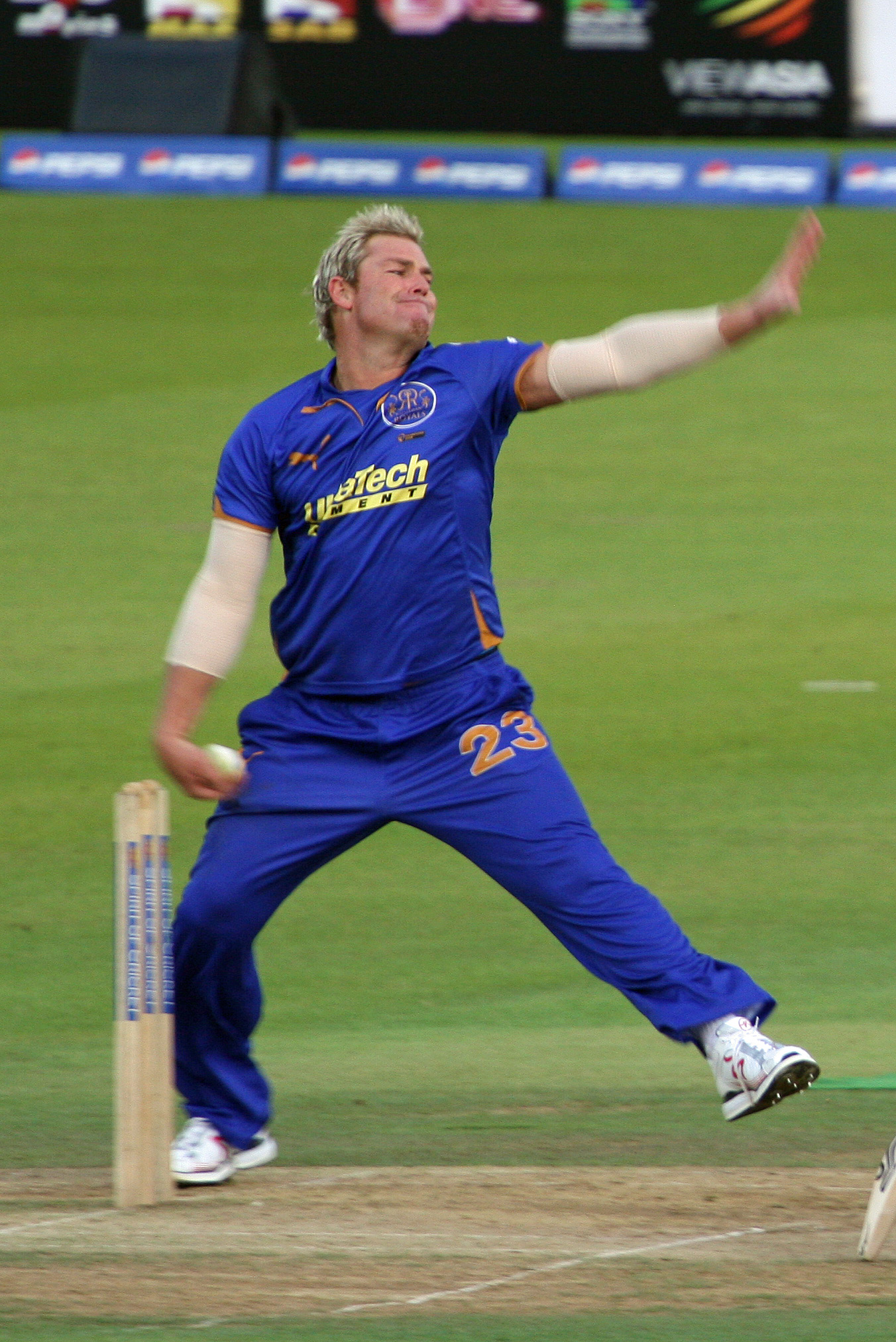
Cricketer Shane Warne make his appearance in the show during 2006.

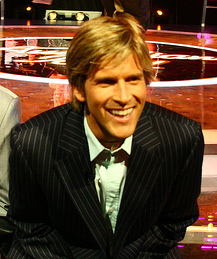
Andrew G made an appearance in February 2007.

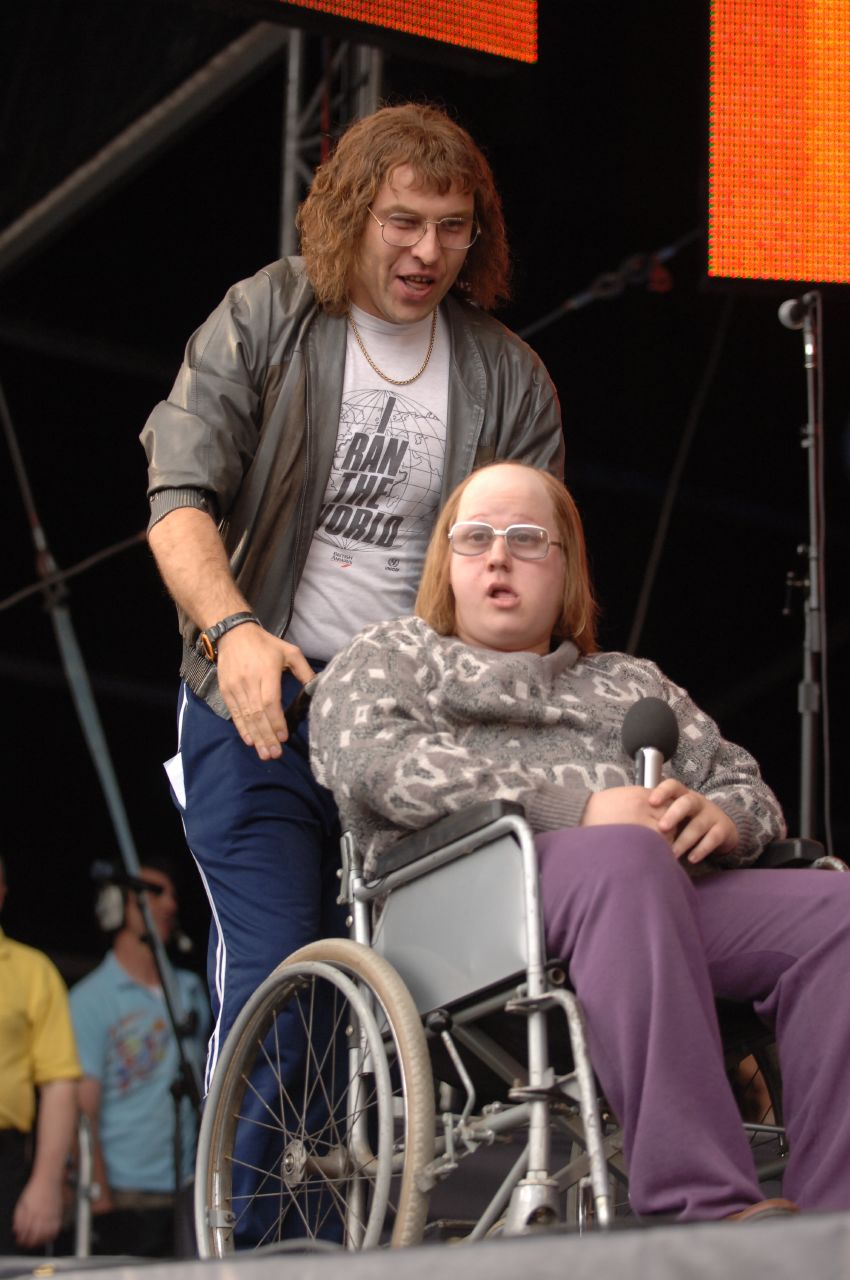
David Walliams and Matt Lucas appeared as their characters, Lou and Andy.

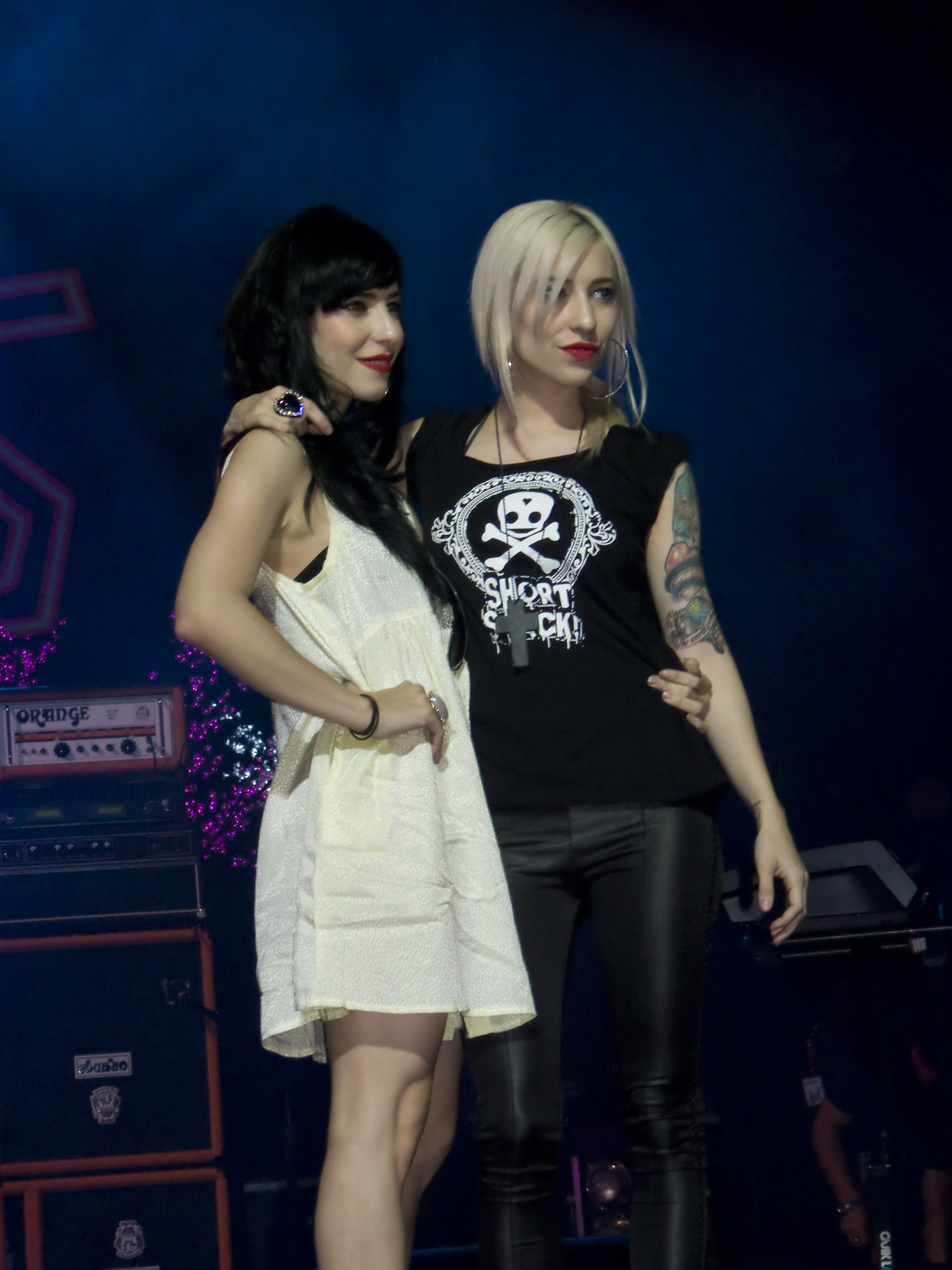
The Veronicas appeared in 2008.

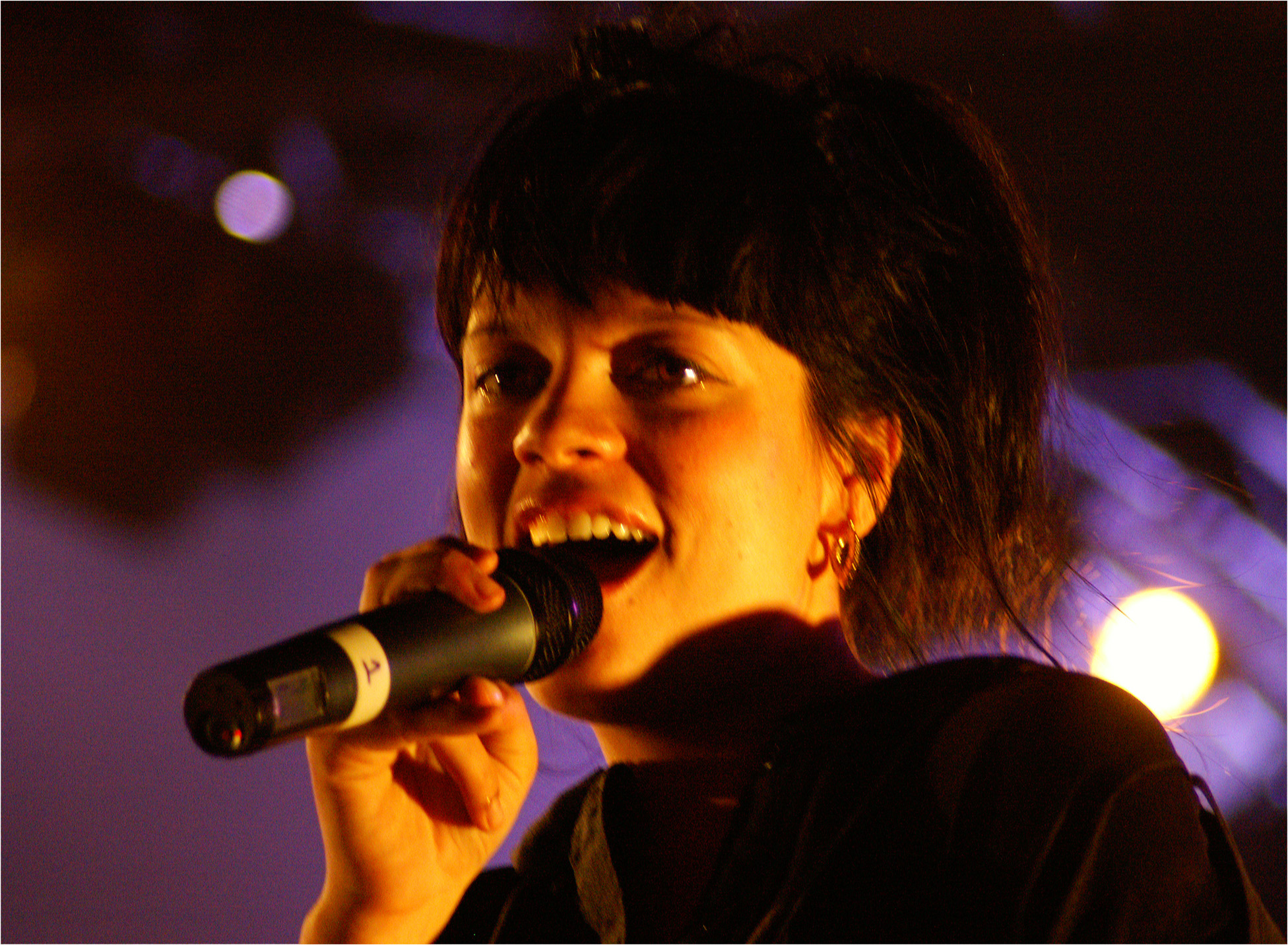
Lily Allen sang during her appearance in 2009.

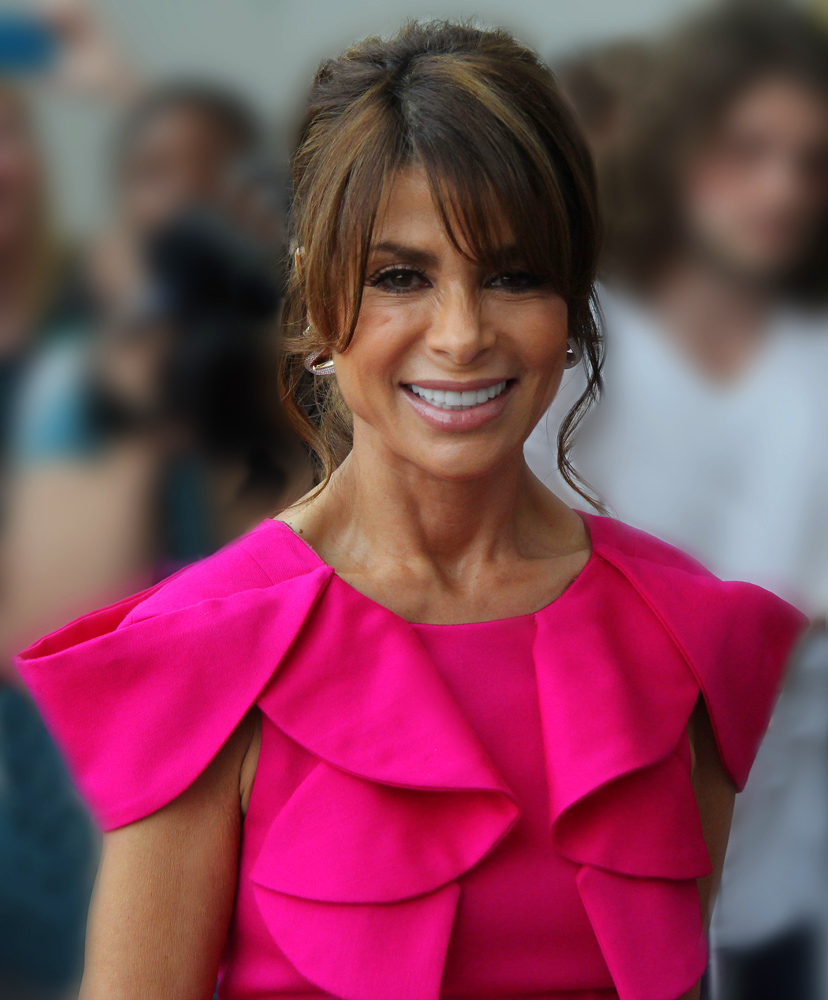
Paula Abdul made a cameo appearance in 2014.

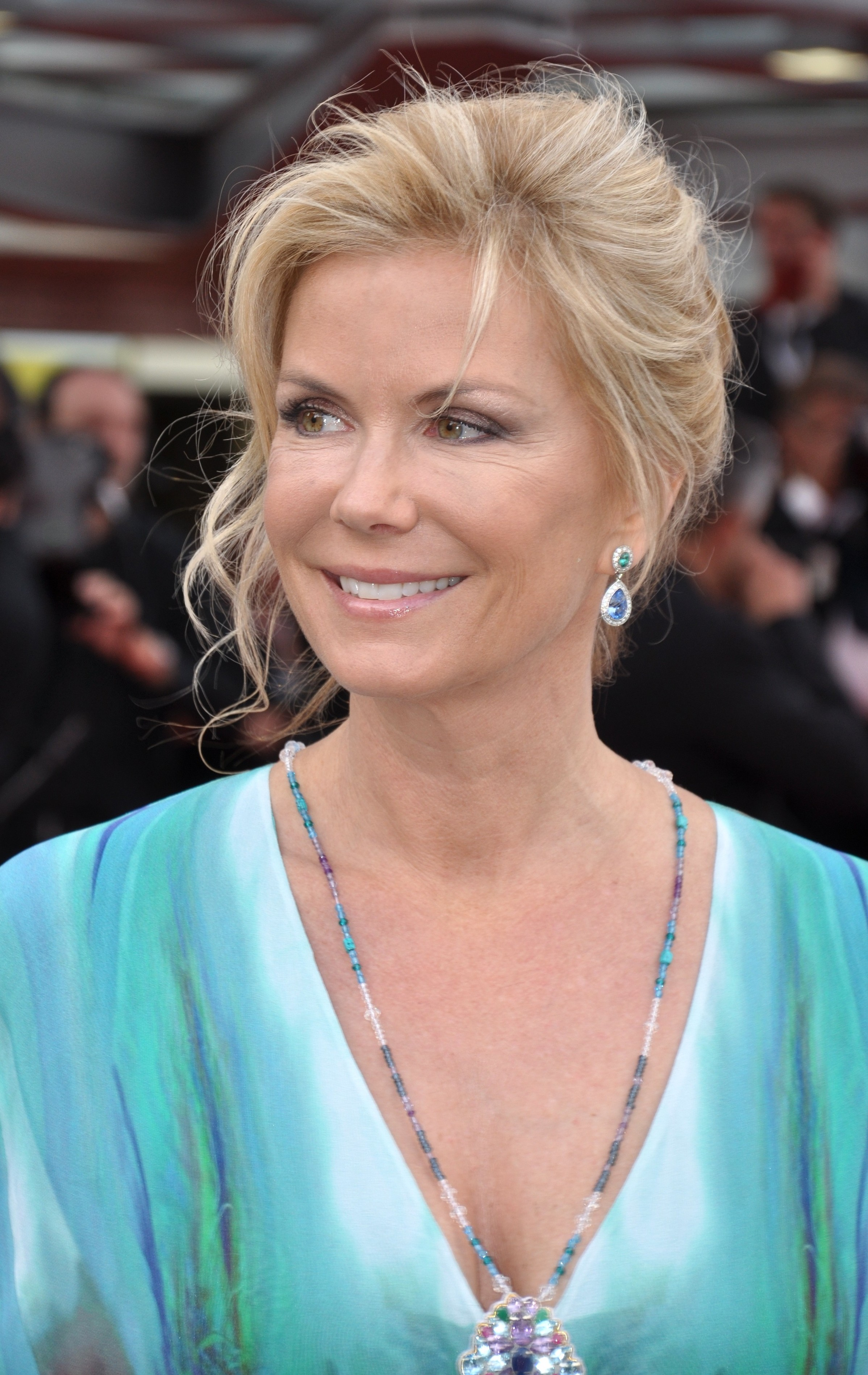
Katherine Kelly Lang made the first celebrity guest appearance of 2016.

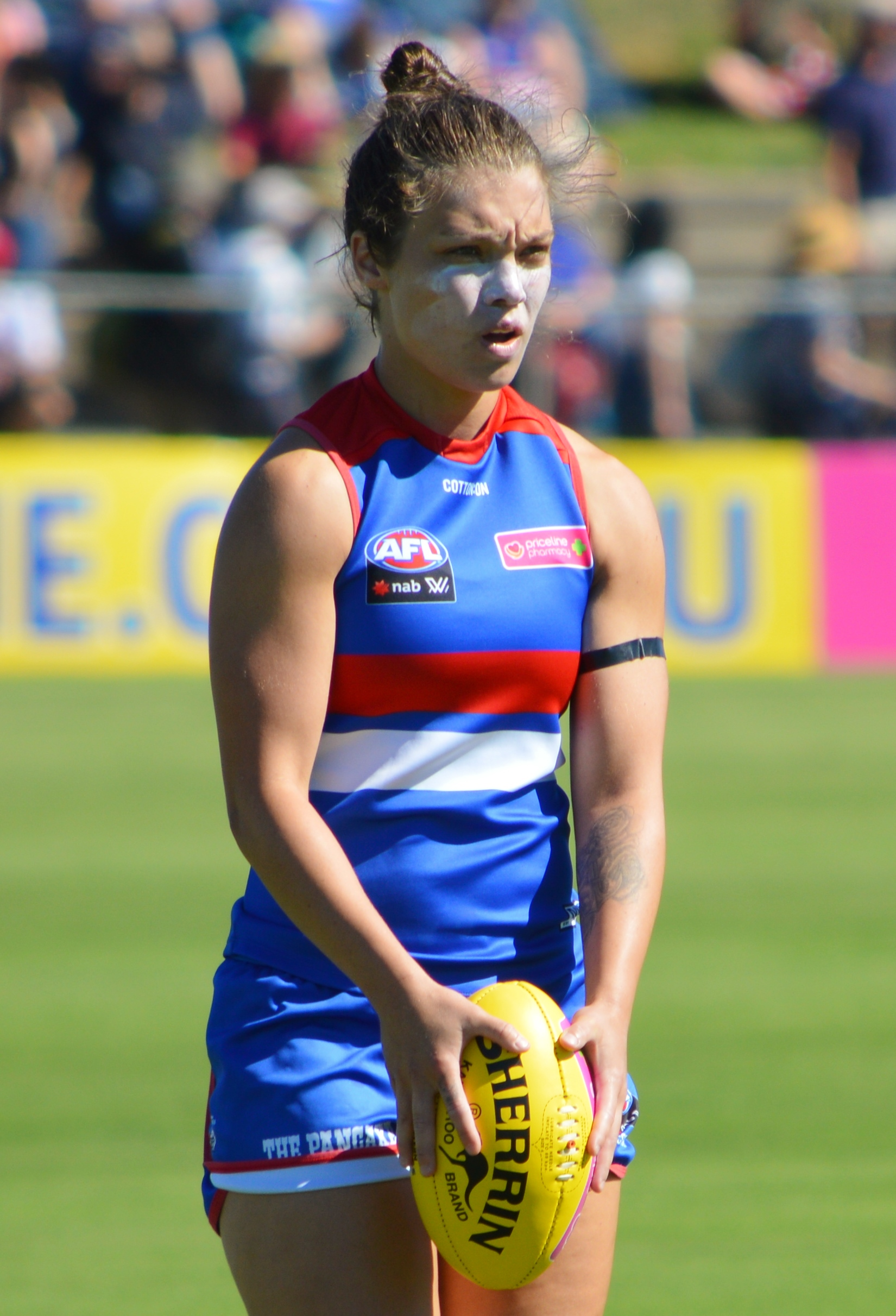
AFL Women's player Ellie Blackburn made an appearance in March 2018.

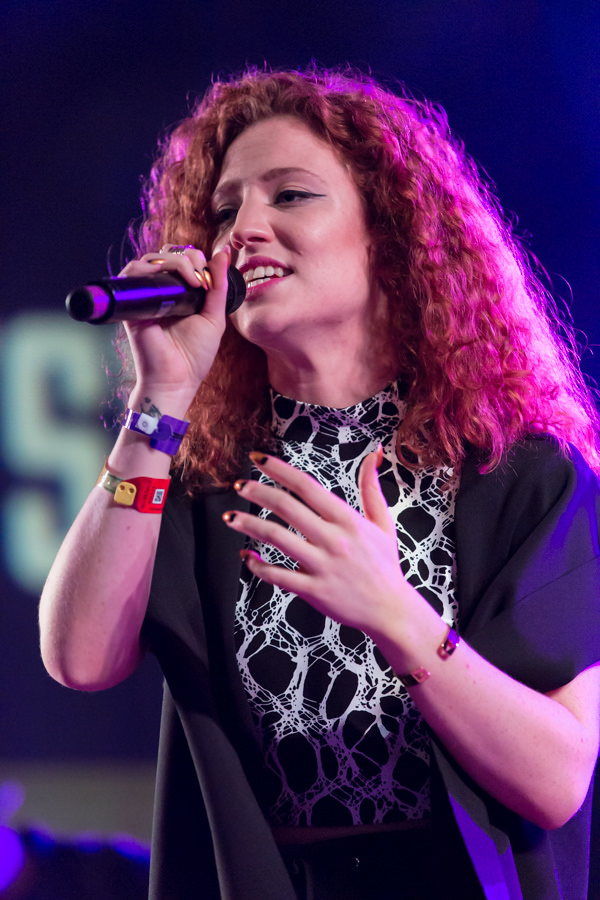
Singer Jess Glynne appeared as herself in a 2019 storyline.

| Year | Celebrity(s) | Role | Reference |
|---|---|---|---|
| 1985 | Red Symons | Gordon Miller | |
| 1986 | Grant Kenny | Himself | |
| 1986 | Warwick Capper | Himself | |
| 1986 | Molly Meldrum | Himself | |
| 1988 | Greg Fleet | Dave Summers | |
| 1989 | Abigail | Betty Bristow | |
| 1990 | Derek Nimmo | Lord Ledgerwood | |
| 1990 | Darryl Cotton | Himself | |
| 1990 | Go 101 | Themselves | |
| 1994 | Mike Whitney | Himself | |
| 1994 | John Hinde | Himself | |
| 1995 | Chris Lowe | Himself | |
| 1996 | Clive James | Postman | |
| 1998 | Dave Graney | Himself | |
| 2000 | Human Nature | Themselves | |
| 2001 | The Wiggles | Themselves | |
| 2002 | Renton Millar | Himself | |
| 2002 | Steve McCann | Himself | |
| 2002 | Ryan O'Keefe | Himself | |
| 2002 | Jude Bolton | Himself | |
| 2002 | Brett Kirk | Himself | |
| 2006 | Rove McManus | Himself | |
| 2006 | Shane Warne | Himself | |
| 2006 | Brodie Holland | Himself | |
| 2007 | Andrew Günsberg | Himself | |
| 2007 | Emma Bunton | Herself | |
| 2007 | Julian Clary | Himself | |
| 2007 | Michael Parkinson | Himself | |
| 2007 | Jo Whiley | Herself | |
| 2007 | Jonathan Coleman | Himself | |
| 2007 | Neil Morrissey | Priest | |
| 2007 | Sinitta | Herself | |
| 2007 | Matt Lucas | Andy Pipkin | |
| 2007 | David Walliams | Lou Todd | |
| 2007 | Marcia Hines | Herself | |
| 2007 | Magic Dirt | Themselves | |
| 2008 | Little Red | Themselves | |
| 2008 | Hamish & Andy | Fred & Big Tommo | |
| 2008 | The Veronicas | Themselves | |
| 2008 | Bryce Gibbs | Himself | |
| 2008 | Nick Stevens | Himself | |
| 2008 | Shannon Byrnes | Himself | |
| 2008 | Tom Hafey | Himself | |
| 2008 | Tom Lonergan | Himself | |
| 2009 | Ian Dickson | Himself | |
| 2009 | The Wombats | Themselves | |
| 2009 | Clint Bizzell | Adam Clarke | |
| 2009 | André Rieu | Himself | |
| 2009 | Michael Paynter | Himself | |
| 2009 | Dave Batista | Himself | |
| 2009 | Tim Vine | Lost tourist | |
| 2009 | Lily Allen | Herself | |
| 2009 | Jason Coleman | Himself | |
| 2009 | The Black Skirts | Themselves | |
| 2009 | Cassie Davis | Herself | |
| 2010 | Jacob Butler | Himself | |
| 2010 | Guy Grossi | Himself | |
| 2010 | Kate Ceberano | Herself | |
| 2010 | Sophie Koh | Herself | |
| 2010 | Ben Lee | Himself | |
| 2010 | Andrew Gaze | Himself | |
| 2010 | Lehmo | Himself | |
| 2011 | Travis Cloke | Himself | |
| 2011 | Alan Toovey | Himself | |
| 2011 | Tyson Goldsack | Himself | |
| 2011 | Cameron Wood | Himself | |
| 2012 | Amy Pearson | Herself | |
| 2012 | Grace Knight | Valerie Edwards | |
| 2012 | Ian Moss | Himself | |
| 2012 | Andy Clemmensen | Harry Vass | |
| 2013 | Amali Ward | Herself | |
| 2014 | Nicole Livingstone | Herself | |
| 2014 | Paula Abdul | Herself | |
| 2015 | Matt Preston | Himself | |
| 2015 | Gina Liano | Mary Smith | |
| 2015 | Darren Purchese | Himself | |
| 2015 | Candice Alley | Cecilia Saint | |
| 2016 | Katherine Kelly Lang | Herself | |
| 2016 | Scott Timlin | Himself | |
| 2016 | Jamie Lawson | Himself | |
| 2016 | Grant Denyer | Himself | |
| 2017 | Damien Fleming | Himself | |
| 2017 | Meg Lanning | Herself | |
| 2017 | Shane Watson | Himself | |
| 2017 | Brendan Fevola | Himself | |
| 2017 | Abby Coleman | Herself | |
| 2018 | Ellie Blackburn | Herself | |
| 2018 | Ross Wilson | Himself | |
| 2018 | Kallum Watkins | Himself | |
| 2018 | Stevie Ward | Himself | |
| 2018 | Ryan Hall | Himself | |
| 2019 | Janet Street-Porter | Herself | |
| 2019 | Jess Glynne | Herself | |
| 2019 | Kylie Auldist | Herself | |
| 2019 | Dune Rats | Themselves | |
| 2019 | Dallas Frasca | Herself | |
| 2019 | Hanson | Themselves | |
| 2019 | King Calaway | Themselves | |
| 2019 | Cosentino | Himself | |
| 2019 | Jane Harper | Herself | |
| 2020 | Courtney Act | Herself | |
| 2020 | Jake Shears | Himself | |
| 2020 | Russell Brand | Himself | |
| 2022 | Sophie Ellis-Bextor | Herself | |
| 2022 | Brooke Blurton | Herself | |
| 2022 | Barry Du Bois | Himself | |
| 2024 | Richard Quest | Himself | |
| 2025 | G Flip | Themself | |
| 2025 | James Cooke | Himself | |
