= The Living Room (TV series) =

Australian television series

- The revamped logo of The Living Room, which has been in use since May 2020.
- Genre: Lifestyle
- Directed by: Jon Olb; Brent Ferguson; Kate Douglas-Walker; Adam Kotcharian
- Presented by: Amanda Keller
- Starring: Barry Du Bois; Chris Brown; Miguel Maestre
- Country of origin: Australia
- Original language: English
- No. of seasons: 10
- No. of episodes: 367 (list of episodes)

Production
- Executive producers: Paul Rudd; Allison Whitlock; Virginia Hodgson; Sarah Thornton; Caroline Swift; Ciaran Flannery; Nicole Rogers; Alenka Henry
- Producers: Kate Witchard; Jemma Carlton
- Camera setup: Multi-camera
- Running time: 45 minutes
- Production companies: WTFN Entertainment (2012–2019); Network 10 (2020–2022)

Original release
- Network: Network 10
- Release: 11 May 2012 – 25 November 2022

The original The Living Room logo, which was used between 2012 and 2019 before the show's revamp.

The Living Room is an Australian lifestyle program. The show is hosted by Amanda Keller with co-presenters Barry Du Bois, Chris Brown, and Miguel Maestre. The program began airing on Network 10 on 11 May 2012, and aired at 7:30 pm on Fridays. It is a quadruple award-winner of the Logie Award for Most Popular Lifestyle Program, winning it in 2015, 2016, 2017 and 2018.

On 30 November 2019, the program was temporarily axed by Network 10 after 8 seasons, due to cost-cutting measures; however a Christmas special aired on 20 December 2019. On 7 March 2020, it was announced that The Living Room, now produced in-house by Network 10 Studios, had been renewed and it returned on 3 July 2020.

In October 2022, 10 announced that the program would take a break in 2023 and be "rested". Although initially slated to return with the original cast, after Brown signed with the Seven Network in February 2023, in July 2023 Keller stated that she believed the decision was "a death knell" for the show. The show was absent at 10's upfronts for 2024.

== Format ==
The show delves into a range of lifestyle topics including renovations, travel and pet advice and cooking. From 2012 to 2019 the show featured the team presenting stories in front of a studio audience of around 60 people, with a mixture of live and pre-recorded content presented. The studio segments were filmed at Network 10 Studios in Pyrmont, a suburb in Sydney's inner-city.

The show shifted format in 2020, focussing on helping a family each episode instead of featuring several unrelated lifestyle segments. The 2020 season features a "home base" filmed in a converted warehouse in Newtown, and also axed the studio audience.

== Episodes ==
=== Series overview ===
Series	Episodes	Originally released	
Series	Episodes	First released	Last released
1	30	11 May 2012	30 November 2012
2	40	15 February 2013	29 November 2013
3	40	14 February 2014	28 November 2014
4	42	13 February 2015	27 November 2015
5	42	12 February 2016	25 November 2016
6	43	10 February 2017	1 December 2017
7	43	9 February 2018	30 November 2018
8	40	29 March 2019	20 December 2019
9	25	3 July 2020	18 December 2020
10	30	26 March 2021	10 September 2021
Special		20 December 2019	24 December 2020
11	30	8 April 2022	25 November 2022

== Presenters ==
Presenters	Role / Expertise	Tenure
Amanda Keller	Host	2012–2022
Barry Du Bois	Renovations	2012–2022
Chris Brown	Travel and Pets	2012–2022
Miguel Maestre	Cooking	2012–2022

=== Others ===
Visiting experts	Expertise	Tenure
Dylan Falecki	Project Manager	2012–2019
James Treble	Homes Design	2012–2019
Cherie Barber	Renovating For Profit	2012–2019
Andrew Rochford	Health	2013
Lilly Van Epen	Gardening	2013
Jason Cunnigham	Finance	2013–2019
Peter Walsh	Home organizing	2013–2022
Leanne Hall	Mind and Body	2014–2019
Fabian Capomolla	Vegetable gardening	2014
Mat Pember	Vegetable gardening	2014
Jamie Durie	Gardening & Landscaping	2015–2018
Tiffiny Hall	Health & Wellness	2015–2018
Kyal and Kara Demmerich	Design and Renovation	2017–2019
Matt Leacy	Landscaping & Horticulture	2019–2022

=== Stand-in co-hosts ===
==== Chris Brown ====
While Chris Brown is away in Kruger National Park, South Africa, co-hosting the show I'm a Celebrity...Get Me Out of Here! with Julia Morris, his stand-in co-hosts for The Living Room during that period have been chosen from 'turn-of-the-wheel' spins by Amanda. These stand-in co-hosts have included:

==== 2015 ====
1. Tim Robards – TV reality star from The Bachelor Australia
2. Grant Denyer – host of Family Feud
3. Brendan Jones – Amanda's radio co-host
4. Shane Jacobson – Australian actor and former co-host of Top Gear
5. Colin and Justin – Interior decorators and Scottish TV presenters
6. Ben Mingay – Wonderland actor
7. Scott Tweedie – The Loop co-host

==== 2016 ====
1. Jamie Durie – TV presenter, landscaper and horticulturalist
2. Kris Smith – TV personality and model who later became a contestant on I'm a Celebrity...Get Me Out of Here!

==== 2017 ====
1. Shannan Ponton – Personal trainer for contestants on The Biggest Loser

==== 2018 ====
1. Jamie Durie – TV presenter, landscaper and horticulturalist
2. Matty Johnson – TV reality star from The Bachelor Australia
3. Kris Smith – TV personality and model

==== 2019 ====
There were no 'stand-in co-hosts' for Chris Brown during the beginning of 2019 because The Living Room began airing later in the year because the majority of the co-hosts had other commitments. Brown was instead absent from the filming of two episodes as he was on an Antarctic expedition on Aurora Expeditions, with Greg Mortimer.

1. Beau Ryan – host of The Amazing Race Australia
2. Robert Irwin

==== 2020 ====
There were no 'stand-in co-hosts' for Brown in 2020 as the program did not commence airing until July of that year due to the majority of co-hosts having other commitments and negotiations between WTFN Entertainment and Network Ten on the show's rights.

==== Barry Du Bois ====
While Barry Du Bois was away for cancer treatment in 2018, Amanda personally looked for stand-in co-hosts for him.

1. Grant Denyer – host of Family Feud

== Awards and nominations ==
=== Logie Awards ===
Year	Nominee	Award	Result
2013	The Living Room	Most Popular Lifestyle Program	Nominated
2014	The Living Room	Most Popular Lifestyle Program	Nominated
2015	Amanda Keller	Most Popular Presenter	Nominated
2015	The Living Room	Most Popular Lifestyle Program	Won
2016	Amanda Keller	Most Popular Presenter	Nominated
2016	The Living Room	Most Popular Lifestyle Program	Won
2017	The Living Room	Best Lifestyle Program	Won
2018	Amanda Keller	Gold Logie	Nominated
2018	The Living Room	Best Lifestyle Program	Won
2018	Matty Johnson	Most Popular New Talent	Nominated
2019	Amanda Keller	Gold Logie	Nominated
2019	The Living Room	Best Lifestyle Program	Nominated

== See also ==
- List of Australian television series
- Better Homes and Gardens
- Bondi Vet: Coast to Coast
- The Renovators
