= Extreme Clutter with Peter Walsh =

- Also known as: Extreme Clutter; Enough Already! with Peter Walsh
- Genre: Reality
- Presented by: Peter Walsh
- Country of origin: United States
- Original language: English
- No. of seasons: 2
- No. of episodes: 13

Production
- Executive producers: Jeff Kuntz; Peter Walsh
- Running time: 40 to 43 minutes
- Production company: Discovery Studios

Original release
- Network: Oprah Winfrey Network
- Release: January 3, 2011 – January 23, 2012

Extreme Clutter (previously stylized as Enough Already! with Peter Walsh) is an American reality television series on the Oprah Winfrey Network that debuted on January 1, 2011. The series was renewed for a six-episode second season in April 2011, which premiered on January 2, 2012 with the new title of Extreme Clutter.

== Premise ==
It has a format similar to Clean House. Some television critics have noted that the persons on the show who require the services of Walsh to organize their homes are not described as "hoarders", but rather as people with "clutter issues".

== Episodes ==
=== Series overview ===
Season	Episodes	Originally released	
Season	Episodes	First released	Last released
1	8	January 1, 2011	February 21, 2011
2	6	January 1, 2012	January 23, 2012

=== Season 1 (2011) ===
No. overall	No. in season	Title	Original release date
0	0	"Sneak Peek: Enough Already with Peter Walsh"	January 1, 2011
1	1	"Museum of Mommy"	January 3, 2011
2	2	"Making Room for My Husband"	January 10, 2011
3	3	"Family in Crisis"	January 17, 2011
4	4	"Caged by Clutter"	January 24, 2011
5	5	"Twenty Years of Excuses"	January 31, 2011
6	6	"No Room for Intimacy"	February 7, 2011
7	7	"Careers Before Clutter"	February 14, 2011
8	8	"A Charity Case"	February 21, 2011

=== Season 2 (2012) ===
No. overall	No. in season	Title	Original release date
9	1	"A Declutter Team Invasion"	January 1, 2012
10	2	"Buried in Denial"	January 2, 2012
11	3	"Beyond Addiction"	January 9, 2012
12	4	"Addicted to Shopping"	January 12, 2012
13	5	"A Double Intervention"	January 16, 2012
14	6	"My Secret Clutter"	January 23, 2012
