= Melbourne Food and Wine Festival =

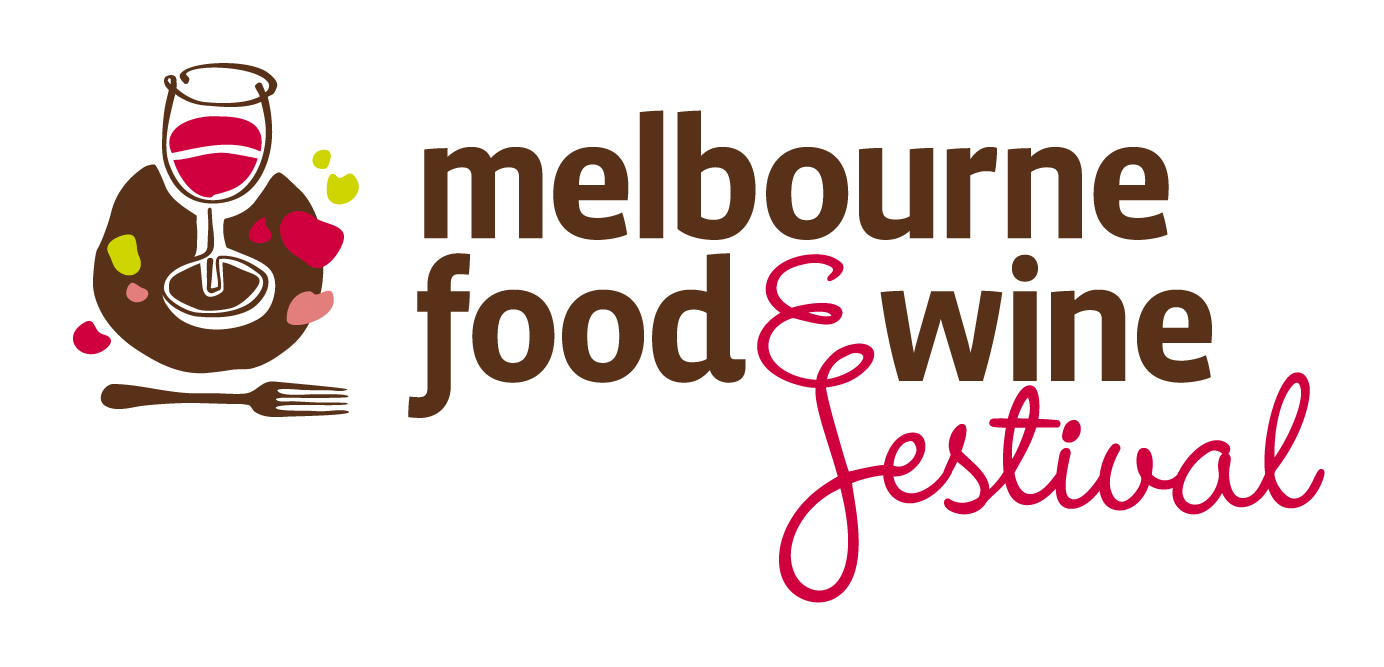

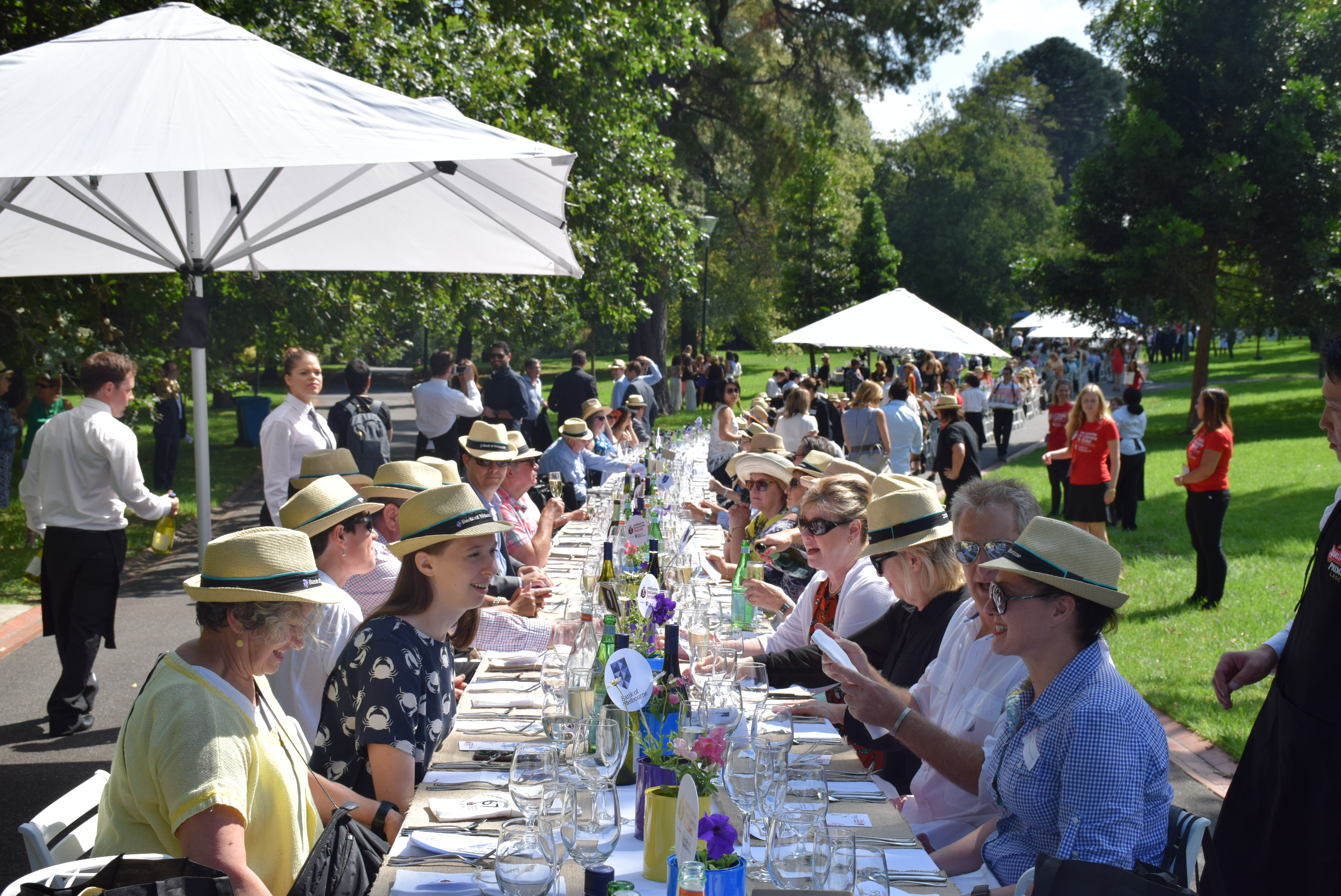
- The World's Longest Lunch 2015
- Genre: Food and beverage
- Locations: Melbourne, Victoria, Australia
- Founded: 1993
- Attendance: 225,840 (2019)
- Website: www.melbournefoodandwine.com.au

The Melbourne Food and Wine Festival, run by Food and Wine Victoria Ltd. is an event held in March annually since 1993 to promote Melbourne and Victoria's food and wine culture.

Operating on a not-for-profit basis, the festival's charter is to promote the produce, talent and lifestyle of Melbourne and Victoria, and to promote Melbourne as the "food and wine capital of Australia". Since its beginnings with a small program of events, the festival has grown to become known for events including cooking classes and large 'banquet-style' lunches.

The festival has a board of management and is supported by a small team who are responsible for the coordination of its events, in close collaboration with Victoria's food and wine industry.

== 20th Year Celebrations 2012 ==
The 20th Melbourne Food and Wine Festival, presented by Bank of Melbourne, celebrated its 50th year over 20 days, 2 – 21 March.

There was around 30 events staged along Melbourne's Yarra River and Docklands. The Festival launch also saw the opening of the Melbourne Food and Wine Festival Greenhouse by "Joost", a temporary "eco-restaurant" erected solely for the 20 days of the Festival.

2012 international individuals in attendance included: Rene Redzepi (Denmark), Brett Graham (UK), Massimo Bottura (Italy), Corey Lee (USA), Stevie Parle (UK), David Chang (USA), Telmo Rodriguez (Spain), Allen Meadows (USA) and Virginie Taupenot-Daniel (France).

2012 Australian individuals in attendance included: Peter Gilmore, Ben Shewry, Darren Purchese, Dan Hunter, Matt Skinner, Luke Burgess, Max Allen and James Halliday AM.

== History ==
The Melbourne Food and Wine Festival began in 1993 with 12 events. Since its inception it has grown annually, the Festival claims to attract food and wine experts from across the world, including chefs and winemakers, growers, purveyors, authors, food and wine commentators and critics.

Food critic Matt Preston was previously the festival's creative director; the 2009 Melbourne Food and Wine Festival was his last.

Most of the 2020 festival went on hiatus. The rest went virtual.

=== Melbourne Food and Wine Festival 2011 ===
The 19th Melbourne and Food and Wine Festival was attended by more than 350,000 people with over 250 events over 11 days.

The Festival was book-ended by two events:

- The first day saw around 4,500 people jointly attending 26 World's Longest Lunches held simultaneously across Victoria. The Melbourne lunch saw 10,000 broad beans, 1,800 cherry tomatoes and more than 200 kg of veal consumed;
- The last weekend of the Festival saw more than 2,600 people join 100 chefs and wine tasters for a large cooking class.

Internationally known individuals in attendance at the 2011 event were: Nigella Lawson (GBR), Elena Arzak (ESP), Roy Choi (USA), Margaret Xu (HKG), Pedra Miguel Schiaffino (PER), Atul Kochhar (GBR), Rachel Allen (IRL), Telmo Rodríguez (ESP), Zakary Pelaccio (USA), Jean-Guillaume Prats (FRA), Chris Salans (INA), Warren Gibson (NZL), Thorsten Schmidt (DEN), Anna Hansen (GBR), Brett Crittenden (GBR), Bompas & Parr (GBE), Angela Hartnett (GBR), Alexa Johnston (NZL), Hisako Ogita (JPN)

Australian born individuals in attendance at the 2011 event were: Stephanie Alexander, Maggie Beer, Will Studd, Gabriel Gaté, George Calombaris, Mary Calombaris, Ben Shewry, Philippe Mouchel, Anna Gare, Jude Blereau, Paris Cutler, Cath Claringbold, Rosa Mitchell, Anthony Ross, Sally Wise, Alla Wolf-Tasker, Adrian Richardson.

Melbourne hosts food and wine festivals every year to attract tourist people into it and to show how diverse Melbourne is with its food.

=== Melbourne Food and Wine Festival 2010 ===
In 2010, the large-scale cooking class, known as the "Langham Melbourne Masterclass" included chefs David Chang (Momofuku, New York), Massimo Bottura (Osteria Francescana, Modena, Italy) and Claude Bosi (Hibiscus, London), and winemaker Gaia Gaja (Angelo Gaja's daughter).

The festival's main event, the large banquet-style lunch, known as the "World’s Longest Lunch" celebrated Melbourne's Chinese heritage and the return of Heat Beads Hawkers' Market to Queen Victoria Market. Simultaneous to the "World’s Longest Lunch in Melbourne", the community of Marysville hosted one of 19 Regional "World’s Longest Lunches" one year after the Black Saturday bushfires. The event formed part of the festival's program of more than 70 regional events.

The festival also grew and installed an urban food-producing garden – 'Metlink Edible Garden' – in Melbourne's City Square.

=== Melbourne Food and Wine Festival 2009 ===
In 2009, the Festival hosted The Fat Duck's Heston Blumenthal (3 stars), The French Laundry's Thomas Keller (7 stars) and Noma's Rene Redzepi (2 stars), as well as winemakers such as the Rhone Valley's Michel Chapoutier and Champagne's Sophie and Pierre Larmandier.

== Recognition ==
Domestic award won include the 2010 RACV Victorian Tourism Awards for"Major Festivals and Events" (Hall of Fame), Melbourne Airport 2008 and 2009 Victorian Tourism Awards in the category of 'Major Festivals and Events' and 2008 Melbourne Awards in the category of 'Community Division – Contribution to Profile'. International awards won include the 2008 International Festival and Events Awards Gold for 'Best Festival Program'.
