= Darren Purchese =

Australian chef, author and television personality

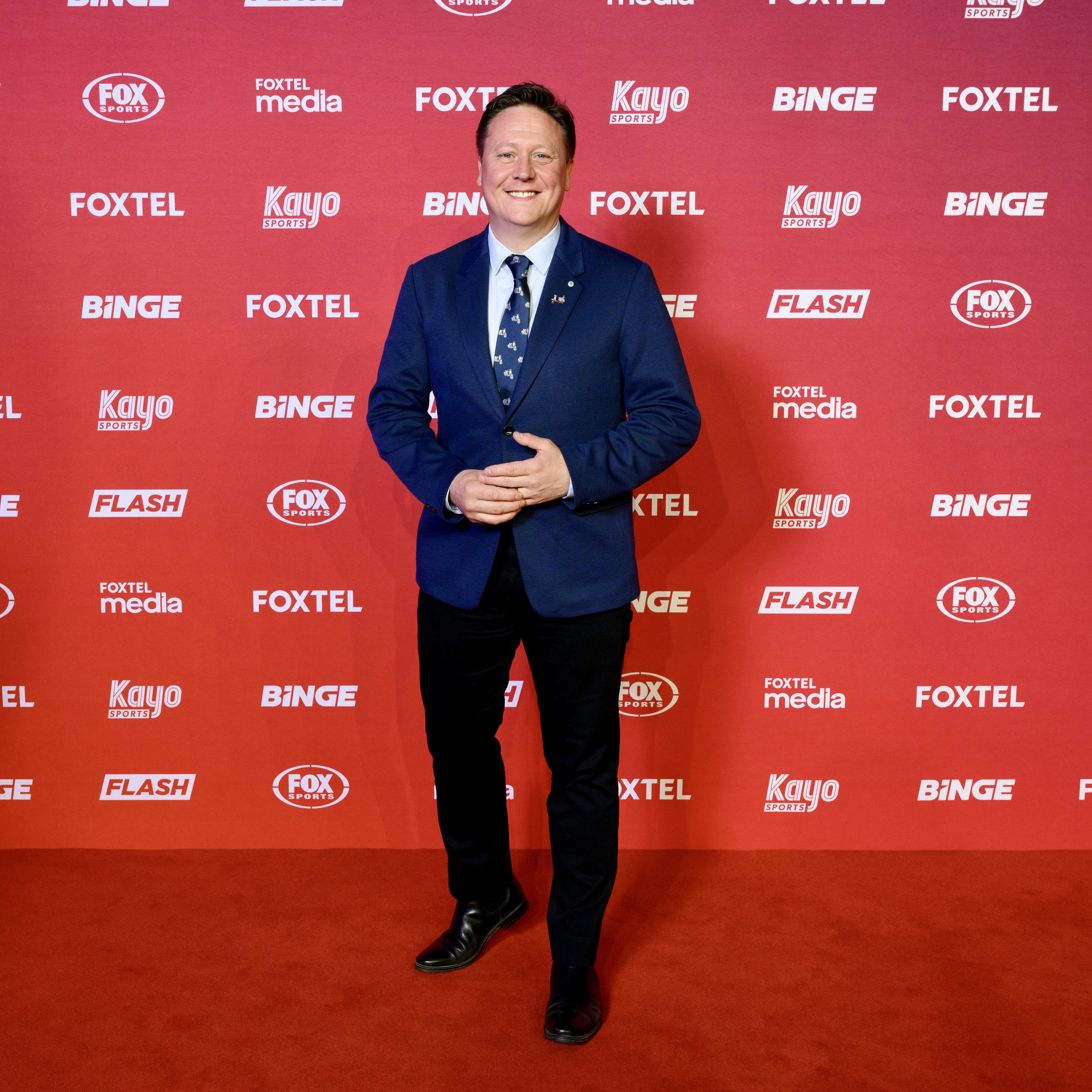
- Born: 3 February 1975 (age 51); Guildford, Surrey, England, UK
- Occupations: Pastry chef; business owner; television personality
- Years active: 1995–present
- Notable work: Sweet Studio – The Art of Divine Desserts, Lamingtons & Lemon Tart, Chefs Eat Toasties Too, Chefs Host Christmas Too, Chefs Eat Breakfast Too
- Television: The Great Australian Bake Off
- Spouse: Cath Claringbold
- Website: www.darrenpurchese.com

Darren Purchese (born 3 February 1975) is an Australian chef, author and television personality. He is the creator of the dessert business Burch & Purchese Sweet Studio in Melbourne, Australia. Purchese has been a guest chef on Network 10's MasterChef Australia. He was a judge on the 2023 season of The Great Australian Bake Off.

== Career ==
=== Pastry chef ===
In 1997, Purchese joined the pastry department at the Savoy Hotel and worked under pastry chef William Curley in the main pastry department, the bakery and in the River Restaurant. He worked his way to the position of senior pastry chef before moving to the Goring Hotel in 2000 as head pastry chef. In 2002, he moved to Raffles Brown's Hotel in Mayfair as pastry chef of '1837' restaurant where he stayed until 2003. He then moved to the Bentley Hotel in Knightsbridge as executive pastry chef. It was during his time at the Bentley Hotel that he received an Acorn Award from the magazine Caterer and Hotelkeeper, an award for the most promising persons under the age of 30 in the UK hospitality industry.

In 2004 while working in London, Purchese was invited to present as a guest chef at The Brisbane Masterclass Weekend in Queensland, Australia. It was here that Purchese met his future wife Cath Claringbold, a Melbourne chef and restaurateur. Purchese returned to Australia, this time to Melbourne, in 2005 and began working for Shannon Bennett at his Vue de Monde restaurant as head pastry chef. During Purchese's time at Vue de Monde, the restaurant received '3 Chef's Hats' in The Age Good Food Guide and Best Restaurant in the Gourmet Traveller Magazine. Purchese also oversaw the pastry department in the newly opened Cafe Vue and Bistro Vue businesses.

Since being in Australia Purchese has also worked as pastry chef for Gary Mehigan at his then restaurant Fenix, as pastry chef at Bennelong Restaurant situated in the iconic Sydney Opera House.

Purchese has been a guest chef at Australian food events and festivals. He presented Masterclasses at the Melbourne Food and Wine Festival in 2010 and 2012. Purchese presented a masterclass at the World Chef Showcase at the 2012 Crave Sydney food festival alongside Antonio Carluccio, Jordi Roca, Christina Tosi, Massimo Bottura and Jason Atherton.

=== Burch & Purchese Sweet Studio ===
In April 2011 Purchese opened Burch & Purchese Sweet Studio on Melbourne's shopping, dining and entertainment precinct Chapel Street. Sweet Studio was primarily a retail space producing cakes and desserts of various flavours and sizes. It was owned and operated by Purchese and his wife Cath Claringbold and ran for 12 years before closing the doors in April 2023.]

B&P featured on a list of "Confectionaries Every Person With a Sweet Tooth Should Visit" on the Matador Network website in 2018. That year, \the shop faced public accusations of poor treatment and underpayment of its staff.

=== Television ===
Purchese regularly appears on Australian television most notably on Foxtel's 'The Great Australian Bake Off' and Network 10's MasterChef Australia where he has appeared as a guest chef and judge. Purchese has also appeared in episodes of MasterChef Australia All-Stars and Junior Masterchef.

Purchese was also a regular chef presenter on Network 10's The Circle and Scope. He has appeared on travel and lifestyle programs on SBS, Nine Network Seven and the ABC. Purchese also appeared in a cameo role in the television series Neighbours in 2015 and again in 2018. In August 2022, Purchese was named as a new judge for the seventh season of the television baking series The Great Australian Bake Off. The season premiered in Australia in June 2023.

In May 2024, Network 10 announced that Purchese was set to appear as a contestant on the forthcoming second season of Dessert Masters.

=== Author ===
Purchese has written five cook books:

- Sweet Studio – The Art of Divine Desserts Murdoch Books (2012) ISBN 978-1-742663-37-1
- Lamingtons & Lemon Tart Hardie Grant Books (2016) ISBN 978-1-743791-86-8
- Chefs Eat Toasties Too – A Pro's Guide To Reinventing Your Sandwich Game Hardie Grant Books (2017) ISBN 978-1-743793-05-3
- Chefs Host Christmas Too – A Cook's Guide To Blitzing The Holiday Season Hardie Grant Books (2018) ISBN 978-1-743794-78-4
- Chefs Eat Breakfast Too – An Expert's Guide To Starting The Day Right Hardie Grant Books (2019) ISBN 978-1-743794-85-2

Chefs Eat Toasties Too has been translated and distributed internationally under the following publishers:

- Tasty Tosti's Luitingh-Sijthoff (2018) ISBN 978-90-245-81-19-1
- Sefkuchari Take Miluji Tousty Metafora (2018) ISBN 978-80-7359-561-6
- Chefs Eat Melts Too Hardie Grant Books (2018) ISBN 978-1-74379-459-3

Purchese has contributed recipes to a number of cook books as a guest contributor, some of the books include:

- The Broadsheet Melbourne Cookbook (2015) ISBN 978-1-743537-84-8
- Forage – A Culinary Journey Through Victoria (2015)

=== Brand relationships ===
Purchese is an ambassador for the AFL Club Sydney Swans.

Purchese is an ambassador for the Cancer Council Australia and My Room Children's Cancer Charity.

In April 2023 Purchese was announced as brand ambassador for the Victorian-based business and cheese producer That's Amore Cheese.

In 2012 Purchese collaborated with Connoisseur, an Australian ice cream producer, to design a new flavour to promote their "Uniquely Australian" range. Murray River Salted Caramel Swirl with Chocolate Coated Toasted Hazelnuts was offered on the Australian market in 2012/2013.
