= Barry Du Bois =

Australian designer, building expert, television presenter and author

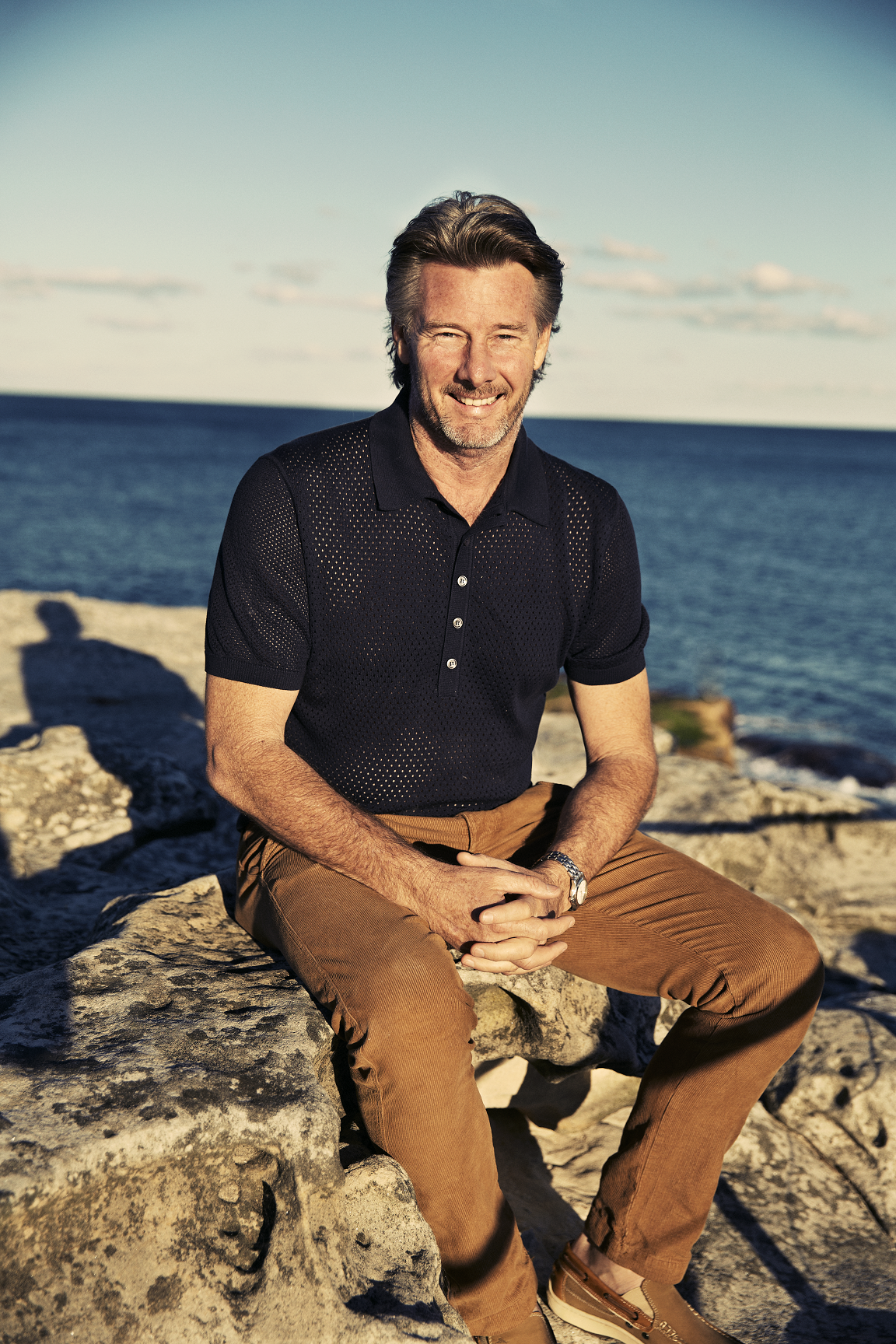
- Barry Du Bois in 2013
- Born: 4 August 1960 (age 66); Sydney, New South Wales, Australia
- Occupations: Builder; designer; building expert; television presenter; author
- Years active: 2000–present
- Employer: Network 10
- Known for: The Living Room; The Renovators
- Spouse: Leonie Tobler (m. 1999)
- Children: 2
- Website: barrydubois.com.au

Barry Du Bois (born 4 August 1960) is an Australian designer, building expert, television presenter and author. Du Bois was a co-host and design/building expert on Network 10's lifestyle program The Living Room.

Du Bois first appeared on reality renovation show The Renovators as a building mentor and judge.

== Education ==
Du Bois attended Chipping Norton Public School and completed Year 10 at Liverpool Boys High School where he excelled at all sports.

== Career ==
In 1976 Du Bois began an apprenticeship in carpentry and joinery, and gained a building certificate in 1980. He was mentored by architects and started to design and build homes as a speculative builder in 1979. Du Bois ran a successful design, building and property development business until retirement in 2005. During that time he served a term as President of the Master Builders Association NSW Eastern Suburbs and acted as an expert building witness for NSW courts and the Department Fair Trading tribunal.

In 2011, Du Bois hosted TEN's renovation reality series, The Renovators.

In 2012, Du Bois joined lifestyle program The Living Room on Network Ten, alongside Amanda Keller, Chris Brown and Miguel Maestre. Heading up the renovations team, Du Bois assists home-owners in need of some expert help.

Du Bois was nominated to the Board of RUOK? Day. He is also an ambassador for the Leukaemia Foundation and a believer in environmental sustainability.

In May 2018, Du Bois and Miguel Maestre released an autobiographical book called Life Force about Du Bois's family, friendships, living with cancer and includes nutritional advice and recipes by Maestre.

In July 2021, Du Bois announced that he was running for the Australian Senate as an independent candidate in New South Wales, but withdrew in April 2022, citing health.

== Personal life ==
Du Bois was born in Sydney, in the suburb of Liverpool, and is now living in the suburb of Bondi.

Du Bois met his partner Leonie Carol Tobler in Bondi in 1992. They married in 1999 and their twins, a son and daughter, were born on 1 June 2012.

Du Bois was diagnosed with plasmacytoma, a cancer of the immune system, in 2010. He underwent successful therapy, but the cancer had already destroyed the vertebrae at the top of his spine. He received a titanium implant in his spine. In 2017, Du Bois announced that the cancer had returned as multiple myeloma.

== Filmography ==
Year	Title	Role	Notes
2011	The Renovators	Presenter	66 episodes
2013, 2023 – present	Studio 10	Guest	
2013	2GB	Guest Presenter The Home Show	12 shows
2013	4BC	Regular Guest Real Estate Expert	6 shows
2015—2016	The Renovation King	Presenter	13 episodes
2012—2022	The Living Room	Presenter	321 episodes
2022	Neighbours	Himself	1 episode

== Books ==
- Life Force by Barry Du Bois and Miguel Maestre, Paperback (2018) : ISBN 9781760682996
