= Peter Walsh (organizer) =

American-Australian businessman

Peter Walsh (born 1956) is an Australian-American professional organizer, writer, and media personality. He became an American citizen in 2002, and has dual citizenship. He lives in Los Angeles.

== Early life and career ==
Walsh was born in rural Victoria, Australia. He was educated at Salesian College, Rupertswood. He holds a master's degree with a specialty in educational psychology. Upon graduation from university he taught high school math, science, and graphic art. He also worked in drug abuse prevention and health promotion, and in developing health, education, and training programs for schools and corporations.

He moved to Los Angeles in 1994, to launch a corporation to help organizations improve employees' job satisfaction and effectiveness. His clients have included numerous Fortune 500 companies as well as private individuals, and he has been president and CEO of an international training and development company.

== Career as professional organizer ==
=== Television and radio ===
In 2003 Walsh's skills caught the eye of the producers of the TLC show Clean Sweep, and he became a professional organizer appearing on more than 120 episodes from 2003 to 2005, helping people declutter and organize their homes and lives. He was then a regular on The Oprah Winfrey Show in the late 2000s. In 2011, he premiered his own show, Enough Already! with Peter Walsh, which aired on OWN: The Oprah Winfrey Network. He has also appeared on the Nate Berkus Show, and beginning in 2013 he is a regular on the Rachael Ray show. He also had a weekly radio show, The Peter Walsh Show, on the Oprah Radio station on SiriusXM. On his regular trips back to Australia, he makes appearances on Channel Ten's The Living Room, helping people declutter their lives. He also makes appearances on other Australian network TV shows, and on radio.

=== Books ===
Walsh has written several books on organization and de-cluttering. These include: How to Organize (Just About) Everything (2004); It's All Too Much (2006); Does This Clutter Make My Butt Look Fat? (2008); It's All Too Much Workbook (2009); and Enough Already! (2009). It's All Too Much is also on DVD.

He has also partnered with OfficeMax in developing several organization systems. He is also a spokesman for California Closets.

== Personal life ==
Walsh has stated he is a very private person. However, in 2009, Proposition 8 prompted him to speak publicly on his radio show about his U.S. citizenship, being gay, and his marriage to partner Ken Greenblatt (m. 2008).
