= The Renovators =

- The Renovators logo
- Presented by: Brendan Moar
- Judges: Robyn Holt Peter Ho Barry Du Bois
- Opening theme: "Party Rock Anthem" by LMFAO
- Country of origin: Australia
- Original language: English
- No. of seasons: 1
- No. of episodes: 66

Production
- Production location: Sydney, Australia
- Running time: 60 minutes
- Production company: Shine Australia

Original release
- Network: Network Ten
- Release: 24 July – 12 October 2011

The Renovators is an Australian competitive reality renovation show that premiered on Network Ten on 24 July 2011. The basic premise consists of 26 contestants who initially compete to become the head renovators of six run-down houses in the suburbs of Sydney, with challenges and eliminations taking place whilst the renovations are in progress. The last remaining contestant responsible for the property that has made the most profit when sold at auction wins the series. Additionally, the winner receives the profit from all six houses.

Network Ten announced in August 2011 that it had commissioned a second season of the series, but indicated that it would modify the program's format to address poor ratings.

== Contestants ==
There are 26 contestants in this season, competing initially as 26 individuals, then as 6 teams of 4.

Contestants

Colour Key

The renovator won the competition
The renovator was eliminated
The renovator withdrew from the competition

Contestant	House	Initial Team Colour	Week 5 Team Colour	Week 8 & 10 Team Colour	Status
Phil	None				Week 1
Laura	None				Week 1
Joanne	Sixties Suburban	Khaki Team			Week 2
Ali	Fibro Cottage	Navy Blue Team			Week 3
Kelly	Fibro Cottage	Navy Blue Team			Week 3
Chris	Sixties Suburban	Khaki Team			Week 3
Tina	Sixties Suburban	Khaki Team			Week 4
Fiona	The Shop	Grey Team			Week 4
Kim	Half Done House	Orange Team			Week 5
Lisa	Half Done House	Orange Team			Week 5
Jason H	The Weatherboard	Green Team			Week 6
Bob	Half Done House	Orange Team			Week 6
Suzanne	Sixties Suburban	Green Team	Khaki Team		Week 7
Kathy	Inner City Terrace	Sky Blue Team			Week 8
Christie	The Shop	Grey Team			Week 10 (Semi Finalist)
Samantha	Half Done House	Sky Blue Team		Orange Team	Week 10 (Semi Finalist)
Jason J	Inner City Terrace	Sky Blue Team			Week 11 (Semi Finalist)
Keenan	The Weatherboard	Green Team			Week 11 (Semi Finalist)
Nathan	Sixties Suburban	Khaki Team			Week 11 (Semi Finalist)
Jarrad	Fibro Cottage	Navy Blue Team			Week 11 (Semi Finalist)
Peter	Half Done House	Orange Team			At Finals (6th Place)
Natalia	Sixties Suburban	Grey Team		Khaki Team	At Finals (5th Place)
August	The Shop	Grey Team			At Finals (4th Place)
Melissa	The Weatherboard	Green Team			At Finals (3rd Place)
Luke	Inner City Terrace	Sky Blue Team			Runner-Up (2nd Place)
Michael	Fibro Cottage	Navy Blue Team			Winner (1st Place)

== Challenge Elimination Chart ==
Colour Key

The renovator was eliminated before teams were picked
The renovator is part of the Fibro Cottage Team
The renovator is part of the 60's Suburban Team
The renovator is part of the Weatherboard Team
The renovator is part of the Shop Team
The renovator is part of the Half done House Team
The renovator is part of the Inner City Terrace Team

The renovator won the competition
The renovator lost the challenge and was at risk of elimination
The renovator won the challenge and received a working bee for their house
The renovator won the challenge and received cash or 2 tradesmen for 48 hours
The renovator won the face off to be the last one standing to take the house to auction and advance to the grand final
The renovator was eliminated
The renovator withdrew from the competition

Elimination Progress
Renovator	Week																					
Renovator	1	2	3		4	5			6		7		8		10			11				12
Michael	LEADER	IN	LOSE	IN	IN	IN	IN	WIN	IN	IN	IN	IN	IN	LOSE	IN						WIN	1st Place
Luke	LEADER	IN	IN	IN	IN	IN	IN	LOSE	WIN	IN	LOSE	LOSE	IN	LOSE	IN			WIN				2nd Place
Melissa	CHOSEN	WIN	WIN	IN	WIN	IN	WIN	IN	LOSE	LOSE	IN	IN	IN	WIN	IN				WIN			3rd Place
August	CHOSEN	WIN	IN	WIN	LEADER	IN	IN	IN	IN	IN	IN	WIN	WIN	IN	WIN	WIN						4th Place
Natalia	CHOSEN	WIN	IN	WIN	IN	IN	IN	IN	IN	IN	IN	WIN	WIN	IN	CHOSEN					WIN		5th Place
Peter	LEADER	IN	IN	WIN	IN	WIN	LOSE	LOSE	IN	LOSE	IN	LOSE	IN	LOSE	IN		WIN					6th Place
Jarrad	CHOSEN	IN	LOSE	IN	IN	IN	IN	WIN	IN	IN	IN	IN	IN	LOSE	IN						ELIM	
Nathan	CHOSEN	LOSE	IN	LOSE	LOSE	LEADER	IN	LOSE	IN	WIN	IN	LOSE	IN	IN	LEADER					ELIM		
Keenan	CHOSEN	WIN	WIN	IN	WIN	IN	WIN	IN	LOSE	LOSE	LEADER	IN	IN	WIN	IN				ELIM			
Jason J	CHOSEN	IN	IN	IN	IN	IN	IN	LOSE	WIN	IN	LOSE	LOSE	IN	LOSE	IN			ELIM				
Samantha	CHOSEN	IN	IN	IN	IN	IN	IN	LOSE	WIN	IN	ELIM		CHOSEN	IN	IN		ELIM					
Christie	CHOSEN	WIN	IN	WIN	IN	IN	IN	IN	IN	IN	IN	WIN	WIN	IN	WIN	ELIM						
Kathy	CHOSEN	IN	IN	IN	IN	IN	IN	LOSE	WIN	IN	LOSE	LOSE	IN	ELIM								
Suzanne	CHOSEN	WIN	WIN	IN	WIN	CHOSEN	IN	LOSE	IN	WIN	IN	ELIM										
Bob	CHOSEN	IN	IN	WIN	IN	WIN	LOSE	LOSE	IN	ELIM												
Jason H	LEADER	WIN	WIN	IN	WIN	IN	WIN	IN	ELIM													
Lisa	CHOSEN	IN	IN	WIN	IN	WIN	LOSE	ELIM														
Kim	CHOSEN	IN	IN	WIN	IN	WIN	ELIM															
Fiona	LEADER	IN	WIN	WIN	WD																	
Tina	CHOSEN	LOSE	LEADER	LOSE	ELIM																	
Chris	CHOSEN	LOSE	IN	ELIM																		
Kelly	CHOSEN	IN	ELIM																			
Ali	CHOSEN	IN	WD																			
Joanne	LEADER	ELIM																				
Laura	ELIM																					
Phil	WD																					

- In Week 10, all teams were announced cash prize winners based on their bathrooms. The 60's Suburban came in 1st, with a $30 000 cash prize, and The Inner City Terrace and The Half Done House coming 2nd and 3rd, and receiving $20 000 and $15 000 respectively. All other teams received $10 000
- Withdrawal Reason
  - Phil: Wanted to return home to family
  - Ali: Altercation with Team/ Kelly
  - Fiona: Medical (Eye Injury)

== Houses ==
Name	Final Key Holder	Address	Distance from CBD !	Style	Purchase Price	Renovation Budget (20% of Purchase Price)	Land Size	Notes
The Fibro Cottage	Michael	85 Harold St Blacktown	40.5 km	1950s Post-war Fibro Cottage	$309,990	$61,998 + $65,000^{1}	556m^{2}	The Fibro Cottage dates back to the 1950s post-war -housing boom. It's a tiny house on a very large block.
The Weatherboard	Melissa	51 Franklin St Parramatta	25 km	1930s Weatherboard Bungalow	$478,213	$95,642 + $20,000^{1}	487m^{2}	The Weatherboard is a 1930s Bungalow that has been in the same family for 50 years.
The Shop	August	146 Addison Road Marrickville	7.5 km	1915 former general store	$594,730	$118,946 + $10,000	310m^{2}	The Shop was built in 1915. It was formerly a general store and most recently a fast food shop.
Sixties Suburban	Natalia	15 Anthony Rd Castle Hill	33 km	1960s Red-Brick veneer	$631,828	$126,366 + $40,000^{1}	664 m^{2}	The Sixties Suburban was originally a fibro house, given a red-brick veneer facelift in the 1960s.
Half-Done House	Peter	5 Frederick St St Peters	8.5 km	Early 20th century Freestanding Edwardian Terrace	$668,403	$133,681 + $35,000^{1}	278m^{2}	The Half-Done House is an early 20th century Freestanding Edwardian Terrace.
Inner-City Terrace	Luke	12 Hegarty Street Glebe	4 km	1880s Victorian Terrace	$749,390	$149,878 + $20,000	100 m^{2}	The Inner City Terrace is an 1880s Victorian Terrace. Nothing has been changed internally or externally since 1952.

^1 This money was won on a weekly challenge.

== Ratings ==
Colour key:
– Highest rating during the series
– Lowest rating during the series
– Finals week

Week	Episode		Original Airdate	Timeslot	Viewers (in millions)	Rank (Night)	Week Avg.	Source
1	1	"The 48 Hour Challenge"	24 July 2011	Sunday 6:30 pm	0.858	#12	0.914	
1	2	"The Hammer Challenge "	25 July 2011	Monday 7:00 pm	0.978	#8	0.914	
1	3	"Off-Site Challenge"	26 July 2011	Tuesday 7:00 pm	0.974	#10	0.914	
1	4	"Car Parts Challenge"	27 July 2011	Wednesday 7:00 pm	0.855	#11	0.914	
1	5	"Street Appeal Challenge"	28 July 2011	Thursday 7:00 pm	0.909	#10	0.914	
2	6	"Double Elimination Challenge"	1 August 2011	Monday 7:00 pm	0.906	#12	0.831	
2	7	"Building Plans"	2 August 2011	Tuesday 7:00 pm	0.838	#12	0.831	
2	8	"Challenge - Coffee Table"	3 August 2011	Wednesday 7:00 pm	0.784	#13	0.831	
2	9	"Stress Test - Property Research Calbooture"	4 August 2011	Thursday 7:00 pm	1.056	#6	0.831	
2	10	"How To - DIY Bathroom"	5 August 2011	Friday 7:00 pm	0.574	#16	0.831	
3	11	"Challenge - Brick Wall"	7 August 2011	Sunday 6:30 pm	1.269	#8	0.766	
3	12	"Progress Inspection"	8 August 2011	Monday 7:00 pm	0.786	#11	0.766	
3	13	"Panic Room - 80s Dinner Party"	9 August 2011	Tuesday 7:00 pm	0.812	#14	0.766	
3	14	"Challenge - Gardenmania"	10 August 2011	Wednesday 7:00 pm	0.668	#14	0.766	
3	15	"Stress Test - Property Research Collingwood"	11 August 2011	Thursday 7:00 pm	0.661	#13	0.766	
3	16	"How To - Timber Table"	12 August 2011	Friday 7:00 pm	0.405	#18	0.766	
4	17	"Challenge - Hang A Picture"	14 August 2011	Sunday 6:30 pm	0.664	#14	0.668	
4	18	"Progress Inspection"	15 August 2011	Monday 7:00 pm	0.670	#18	0.668	
4	19	"Panic Room - Office Rescue"	16 August 2011	Tuesday 7:00 pm	0.710	#18	0.668	
4	20	"Challenge - Reverse Garbage"	17 August 2011	Wednesday 7:00 pm	0.782	#13	0.668	
4	21	"Stress Test - Property Research"	18 August 2011	Thursday 7:00 pm	0.774	#10	0.668	
4	22	"How To - Stud Walls"	19 August 2011	Friday 7:00pm	0.409	#19	0.668	
5	23	"Challenge - Lego Tower "	21 August 2011	Sunday 6:30 pm	0.407	#20	0.631	
5	24	"Progress Inspection"	22 August 2011	Monday 7:00 pm	0.611	#18	0.631	
5	25	"Panic Room - Run-Down Kitchen"	23 August 2011	Tuesday 7:00 pm	0.833	#12	0.631	
5	26	"Challenge - BBQ Area"	24 August 2011	Wednesday 7:00 pm	0.699	#15	0.631	
5	27	"Stress Test - Curtains & Flat Packs"	25 August 2011	Thursday 7:00 pm	0.767	#9	0.631	
5	28	"How To - Fathers Day"	26 August 2011	Friday 7:00pm	0.469	#19	0.631	
6	29	"Challenge - Flat Pack Carport"	28 August 2011	Sunday 6:30 pm	0.723	#14	0.621	
6	30	"Progress Inspection"	29 August 2011	Monday 7:00 pm	0.679	#17	0.621	
6	31	"Panic Room - Courtyards"	30 August 2011	Tuesday 7:00 pm	0.695	#15	0.621	
6	32	"Challenge - Feature Light"	31 August 2011	Wednesday 7:00 pm	0.607	#15	0.621	
6	33	"Stress Test - Oldest to Newest and a Ceiling Rose"	1 September 2011	Thursday 7:00 pm	0.625	#18	0.621	
6	34	"How To - A Window for a Door"	2 September 2011	Friday 7:00 pm	0.399	#20	0.621	
7	35	"Challenge - Concrete Slab"	4 September 2011	Sunday 6:30 pm	0.517	#16	0.607	
7	36	"Progress Inspection"	5 September 2011	Monday 7:00 pm	0.745	#15	0.607	
7	37	"Panic Room - Summer Theme"	6 September 2011	Tuesday 7:00 pm	0.667	#16	0.607	
7	38	"Challenge - Bath House"	7 September 2011	Wednesday 7:00 pm	0.631	#15	0.607	
7	39	"Stress Test - Lighting Order"	8 September 2011	Thursday 7:00 pm	0.637	#15	0.607	
7	40	"How To - Concrete"	9 September 2011	Friday 7:00 pm	0.449	#18	0.607	
8	41	"Queensland Flood Aid - Goodna"	11 September 2011	Sunday 6:30 pm	0.664	#15	0.629	
8	42	"Queensland Flood Aid - Rocklea"	12 September 2011	Monday 7:00 pm	0.580	#22	0.629	
8	43	"Queensland Flood Aid - Southbank (Brisbane)"	13 September 2011	Tuesday 7:00 pm	0.719	#15	0.629	
8	44	"Queensland Flood Aid - Darra"	14 September 2011	Wednesday 7:00 pm	0.659	#15	0.629	
8	45	"Stress Test -Vertical Garden"	15 September 2011	Thursday 7:00 pm	0.696	#13	0.629	
8	46	"Four Weeks till Auction Update"	16 September 2011	Friday 7:00 pm	0.460	#18	0.629	
8	47	"Challenge - Express Yourself"	18 September 2011	Sunday 6:30 pm	0.614	#13	0.655	
8	48	"Progress Inspection - Bedroom Reveal "	19 September 2011	Monday 7:00 pm	0.703	#13	0.655	
8	49	"Panic Room - Bathroom Nightmare"	20 September 2011	Tuesday 7:00 pm	0.650	#19	0.655	
8	50	"Challenge - Recycled Site Office"	21 September 2011	Wednesday 7:00 pm	0.754	#13	0.655	
8	51	"Challenge - Wall Styling"	22 September 2011	Thursday 7:00 pm	0.746	#14	0.655	
8	52	"Moving Day"	23 September 2011	Friday 7:00 pm	0.464	#16	0.655	
9	53	"Challenge - Make an Artistic Statement"	25 September 2011	Sunday 6:30 pm	0.692	#14	0.631	
9	54	"Progress Inspection - Bathroom Reveal"	27 September 2011	Tuesday 7:00 pm	0.803	#12	0.631	
9	55	"Head to Head - The Shop"	28 September 2011	Wednesday 7:00 pm	0.817	#13	0.631	
9	56	"Challenge - Wedding Reception"	29 September 2011	Thursday 7:00 pm	0.695	#13	0.631	
9	57	"Head to Head - The Half Done House"	30 September 2011	Friday 7:00 pm	0.547	#10	0.631	
9	58	"Meet the Renovators Families"	30 September 2011	Friday 8:00 pm	0.232	#33	0.631	
10	59	"Challenge - The Finale White Room"	2 October 2011	Sunday 6:30 pm	0.508	#19	0.709	
10	60	"Challenge - Streetwise"	4 October 2011	Tuesday 7:00 pm	0.868	#12	0.709	
10	61	"Head to Head - Inner City Terrace"	5 October 2011	Wednesday 7:00 pm	0.754	#14	0.709	
10	62	"Head to Head - Weatherboard House"	6 October 2011	Thursday 7:00 pm	0.800	#10	0.709	
10	63	"Final Head to Head"	7 October 2011	Friday 7:00 pm	0.656	#9	0.709	
10	64	"Advice From the Judges"	7 October 2011	Friday 8:00 pm	0.671	#8	0.709	
11	65	"The Final Inspection"	9 October 2011	Sunday 6:30 pm	0.744	#17	1.043	
11	66	"The Auctions"	12 October 2011	Wednesday 7:00 pm	1.122	#3	1.043	
11	66	"Winner Announced"	12 October 2011	Wednesday 7:00 pm	1.264	#1	1.043	
Series Average - 0.791

== International ==
Country	Title	Broadcaster
Brazil	The Renovators	Oi TV, Glitz*
Canada	Les renovateurs	Casa
Finland	Remontoijat	AVA
Italy	The Renovators - Case fai da te	Sky Uno, Cielo
Spain	Renovators	Divinity
USA	The Renovators (adaptation)	FOX
