= Beef Australia =

Agricultural trade fair

Beef Australia is an international exposition held triennially in Rockhampton, Queensland, Australia. The week-long expo has been held in the city during the month of May triennially since the inaugural event in 1988. The event is promoted and used as an opportunity to facilitate international trade opportunities for those involved in the beef industry. However, it is also considered more generally as a celebration of the local beef industry in Central Queensland. In 2015, almost 90,000 people attended the event.

Held at the Rockhampton Showgrounds in the suburb of Wandal, the event usually consists of cattle judging, a symposium, seminars, organised tours of local cattle properties, educational information for children, numerous trade exhibitions and live entertainment. Beef Australia has also become known in recent years for attracting numerous celebrity chefs to the city to give live demonstrations on how to cook various beef dishes.

In 2015, celebrity chefs at Beef Australia included Alvin Leung, Matt Golinski, Alastair McLeod and Ben O'Donoghue as well as contestants from television programs MasterChef Australia and My Kitchen Rules. In 2017, it was announced that Hiroyuki Sakai and Curtis Stone would be appearing at the 2018 event. Australian author Bryce Courtney and Australian artist Hugh Sawrey are also among the celebrities that have attended the event since its inception in 1988. Beef Australia also attracts Australian political leaders, who often use it to announce policies relating to the agricultural sector. The expo attracts considerable media interest.

A new mascot for Beef Australia, Johnny Stockman, was announced in 2017.

2021 was Beef Australia XII, with Bryce Camm as its chairman. XIII will return in 2024.
