= Celebrity MasterChef Australia series 1 =

Australian television series season

Celebrity MasterChef Australia
- Season 1
- Judges: George Calombaris; Gary Mehigan; Matt Preston
- No. of contestants: 18
- Winner: Eamon Sullivan
- Runner-up: Kirk Pengilly

Release
- Original network: Network Ten
- Original release: 30 September – 25 November 2009

Series chronology
- Next → Series 2

The first series of the Australian cooking game show Celebrity MasterChef Australia began production in early September 2009, and premiered on Network Ten on 30 September 2009. Matt Preston, George Calombaris and Gary Mehigan returned as judges for the show; however Sarah Wilson did not reprise her role as host from the first season of MasterChef Australia.

Former world-record holder and Olympic medalist Eamon Sullivan won the series, taking home $50,000 for the charity Swim Survive Stay Alive.

== Contestants ==
Celebrity MasterChef Australia series 1 featured 18 celebrities as contestants. Network Ten officially revealed the first batch on the 3 September 2009 episode of The 7pm Project. However, several contestants were revealed before Ten's official announcement of their participation.

The contestants included:

Contestant	Occupation	Status
Eamon Sullivan	Olympic freestyle swimmer	Winner 25 November
Kirk Pengilly	INXS musician	Runner-Up 25 November
Rachael Finch	Miss Universe Australia 2009	Third Place 25 November
Alex Lloyd	Singer-songwriter	Eliminated 24 November
Michelle Bridges	The Biggest Loser personal trainer	Eliminated 18 November
Simon Katich	New South Wales Blues cricketer	Eliminated 11 November
Faustina "Fuzzy" Agolley	Video Hits presenter	Eliminated 4 November
Peter Rowsthorn	Actor & stand-up comedian	Eliminated 4 November
George Negus	Journalist & television presenter	Eliminated 28 October
Ryan O'Keefe	Sydney Swans midfielder	Eliminated 28 October
Wendy Harmer	Comedian & radio presenter	Eliminated 21 October
Alex Perry	Fashion designer	Eliminated 21 October
Anna Bligh	Politician	Eliminated 14 October
Simon Westaway	Film & television actor	Eliminated 14 October
Peter FitzSimons	Former radio broadcaster & rugby player	Eliminated 7 October
Kathleen de Leon Jones	Singer, dancer & actress (Hi-5)	Eliminated 7 October
Indira Naidoo	Journalist & television presenter	Eliminated 30 September
Josh Thomas	Comedian	Eliminated 30 September

Ten initially announced that actor Steve Bisley would also be a participant, but he later withdrew from the show. The network cited a scheduling conflict for his departure, though ABC claimed that Ten used it as an excuse; the announcement of his participation on the show was the same day the actor was charged with assaulting his ex-wife Sally Burleigh during an argument between the former couple. Rachael Finch previously auditioned for the first series of MasterChef Australia, but did not make past the initial rounds.

== Guest chefs ==
- Matt Moran - Heat 1 pressure test
- Brent Savage - Heat 2 pressure test
- Kylie Kwong - Heat 3 pressure test
- Stephanie Alexander - Heat 4 pressure test
- Tony Bilson - Heat 5 pressure test
- Katrina Kanetani - Heat 6 pressure test
- Steven Krasicki - Semifinal 2
- Adriano Zumbo - Semifinal 3
- Andrew McConnell - Grand finale

== Episodes ==
Ep#	Original airdate	Episode Title / Event	Total viewers (five metro cities)	Nightly Ranking	Weekly Ranking
Heats
1	Wednesday 30 September 2009	Heat 1 - Indira Naidoo, Kirk Pengilly and Josh Thomas. Pengilly moved onto the semi-finals.	1,363,000	#2	#12
2	Wednesday 7 October 2009	Heat 2 - Michelle Bridges, Kathleen de Leon and Peter FitzSimons. Bridges moved onto the semi-finals.	1,090,000	#10	#31
3	Wednesday 14 October 2009	Heat 3 - Eamon Sullivan, Anna Bligh and Simon Westaway. Sullivan moved onto the semi-finals.	1,187,000	#7	#20
4	Wednesday 21 October 2009	Heat 4 - Alex Perry, Wendy Harmer and Simon Katich. Katich moved onto the semi-finals.	1,279,000	#3	#13
5	Wednesday 28 October 2009	Heat 5 - Rachael Finch, George Negus and Ryan O'Keefe. Finch moved onto the semi-finals.	1,150,000	#8	#26
6	Wednesday 4 November 2009	Heat 6 - Fuzzy Agolley, Alex Lloyd and Peter Rowsthorn. Lloyd moved onto the semi-finals.	1,224,000	#6	#21
Finals
7	Wednesday 11 November 2009	Semi Final 1 - The first semi-final consisted an individual mystery box challenge followed by a Christmas-themed invention test where the semi-finalists competed in pairs, with one member of the worst performing pair being eliminated. Paired with Alex Lloyd, Simon Katich was eliminated.	1,124,000	#6	#23
8	Wednesday 18 November 2009	Semi Final 2 - The five remaining contestants were required to staff the kitchen at Altitude restaurant in Sydney. They were each allocated a course and after service they were asked to present the dish they prepared for service to the judges for tasting, with the contestant with the worst dish to be eliminated. Michelle Bridges was eliminated.	1,076,000	#8	#29
9	Tuesday 24 November 2009	Semi Final 3 - The four remaining contestants competed in a pressure test involving recreating a croquembouche, with the contestant with the least accomplished dessert to be eliminated. Alex Lloyd was eliminated.	1,083,000	#7	#27
10	Wednesday 25 November 2009	Final - The final involved three rounds: a taste test, a dessert-only invention test and a pressure test, with points being won as the finalists progressed. Based on accumulated points, Rachael Finch and Kirk Pengilly came third and second respectively, with Eamon Sullivan declared the winner of Celebrity MasterChef Australia.	1,297,000	#1	#9

Preceded by MasterChef Australia (series 1)	MasterChef Australia spin-off 30 September 2009 – 25 November 2009	Succeeded by MasterChef Australia (series 2)
