= Melissa Leong =

Food writer and MasterChef Australia judge (born 1982)

- Born: 1982 (age 43–44); Sydney, New South Wales, Australia
- Occupations: Food writer; food critic; television presenter; cookbook editor; radio broadcaster; marketer
- Television: The Chefs' Line; MasterChef Australia
- Spouse: Joe Jones (m. 2017; sep. 2020)

Melissa Leong (born 1982) is an Australian freelance food writer, food critic, television host, radio broadcaster, cookbook editor and marketer. She is currently a judge on Network 10's Dessert Masters alongside Amaury Guichon and was previously a judge on MasterChef Australia from 2020 to 2023, alongside Andy Allen and Jock Zonfrillo.

== Early life ==
Leong was born in 1982 in Sydney and raised in the suburbs of Sutherland Shire. Her parents emigrated to Australia from Singapore. She has a younger brother. She attended a Baptist high school and was confirmed Anglican. From the age of 13 to her early 20s, Leong studied piano but had to give up on a career in music due to a chronic repetitive strain injury. She completed a degree in economics and social sciences at the University of Sydney.

== Career ==
After graduating, Leong worked as a makeup artist. She later moved into advertising where she managed projects and wrote copy. She then began freelance writing about food.

She co-hosted The Chefs' Line with chefs Dan Hong and Mark Olive for two seasons in 2017, and 2018.

In October 2019, it was announced that Leong would be joining Network 10's cooking competition show MasterChef Australia, as a new judge alongside Jock Zonfrillo and Andy Allen, after former judges Matt Preston, Gary Mehigan and George Calombaris left the series when Ten refused to meet the trio's pay rise demands. Leong, Zonfrillo and Allen debuted on episode one of the show's twelfth season, which premiered on 13 April 2020. Later that year, Network 10 announced that a third season of MasterChef spin-off Junior MasterChef Australia, was set to air in October 2020, with Leong appearing as a judge alongside Allen and Zonfrillo.

In November 2020, Leong was named Who's Sexiest Person of 2020 by Who magazine.

In May 2021, it was announced that Leong would appear as a judge in another MasterChef spinoff, the second season of Celebrity MasterChef Australia alongside Allen and Zonfrillo.

In late 2022, Leong was announced as a judge on the all new MasterChef spinoff series, titled Dessert Masters. She judged and co-hosted the show alongside international pastry chef Amaury Guichon. Network 10 announced in their 2023 upfronts that the series was to be aired in the second half of 2023, after the fifteenth season of MasterChef Australia finishes. In October 2023, it was announced that Leong would not be returning as a host of MasterChef Australia.

In 2025, Leong competed in the third edition of the reality competition show The Amazing Race Australia: Celebrity Edition, finishing in sixth place. In September 2025, Leong published her memoir, titled Guts.

== Personal life ==
Leong married Joe Jones in 2017. In December 2020, she announced the two had separated. Leong has had depression and anxiety throughout her life and has an autoimmune condition which has caused chronic insomnia and hair loss. In 2025, Leong publicly revealed that she had been raped when she was working in the hospitality industry in her 20s.
