= Celebrity MasterChef Australia =

- Genre: Cooking; Game show
- Judges: Gary Mehigan; George Calombaris; Matt Preston; Jock Zonfrillo; Melissa Leong; Andy Allen
- Narrated by: Nicholas McKay
- Theme music composer: Katy Perry
- Opening theme: "Hot n Cold"
- Country of origin: Australia
- Original language: English
- No. of series: 2
- No. of episodes: 23

Production
- Executive producers: Paul Franklin; Cathie Scott
- Production locations: Sydney, New South Wales (2009); Melbourne, Victoria (2021)
- Running time: 60 minutes (including commercials)

Original release
- Network: Network 10
- Release: 30 September – 25 November 2009
- Release: 10 October 2021 – present

Celebrity MasterChef Australia is an Australian competitive cooking game show. It is a spin-off of MasterChef Australia, itself an adaptation of the British show MasterChef, and features celebrity contestants.

The first series began production in early September 2009, and premiered on Network Ten on 30 September 2009. Judges Matt Preston, George Calombaris and Gary Mehigan returned from MasterChef Australia for the first series of the show, with Calombaris and Mehigan also taking over as hosts from Sarah Wilson. Former world-record holder and Olympic medallist swimmer Eamon Sullivan won the first series, taking home $50,000 for charity Swim Survive Stay Alive.

On 25 May 2021, it was announced that a second series of Celebrity MasterChef Australia had been commissioned, 12 years after the first edition had aired, it premiered on 10 October 2021 . Andy Allen, Melissa Leong and Jock Zonfrillo undertook the role of judges in the new series.

== Format (2009 show) ==
In contrast to its parent show, the 2009 celebrity version was based around a heats and semi-finals format similar to MasterChef Goes Large, and was aired only once a week in an hourly format.

Celebrities were split into groups of three as they competed in a heat round featuring two challenges, with one celebrity making their way from each heat into the semi-finals. The heats consisted of an Invention Test, in which they prepared a dish of their own concoction, and a Pressure Test, in which they had to complete a dish prepared by a professional chef. Due to the difficulty of these dishes, contestants were given a single "lifeline" in which the chef was able to aid them for 90 seconds.

The six remaining celebrities then faced further challenges in order to secure their place in the final.

== Hosts and judges ==
Timeline of hosts, judges and other personnel
Starring	Series	
Starring	1	2
Jock Zonfrillo		Host & Judge
Melissa Leong		Host & Judge
Andy Allen		Host & Judge
Gary Mehigan	Host & Judge	
George Calombaris	Host & Judge	
Matt Preston	Judge	

== Winners ==
Series	Contestant	Occupation	Date Won
1	Eamon Sullivan	Olympic swimmer	25 November 2009
2	Nick Riewoldt	AFL player	22 November 2021

== Series synopsis ==
=== Series 1 (2009) ===
Celebrity MasterChef Australia, a spin-off featuring celebrities as contestants began production in early September 2009, and aired for ten weeks starting from 30 September 2009. The celebrity version, which features a heats and semi-finals format similar to MasterChef Goes Large, is based around weekly episodes.

The host of the first series of MasterChef Australia, Sarah Wilson, did not return to host the show. Ten states that she was dropped because "the appropriate role for Sarah was not achievable without dramatically changing the format", but Gary Mehigan, George Calombaris and Matt Preston returned as judges, Calombaris and Mehigan took Wilson's presenting role. It was won by Olympic swimmer Eamon Sullivan, who took home $50,000 for charity Swim Survive Stay Alive.

In February 2010, executive producer Mark Fennessy stated that he doubted the spin-off would return for a second series.

=== Series 2 (2021) ===
On 25 May 2021, it was announced that a second edition of Celebrity MasterChef Australia had been commissioned, 12 years after the first edition had aired. It aired in late 2021. Andy Allen, Melissa Leong and Jock Zonfrillo undertook the role of judges in the new series.

On 17 June 2021, Network Ten announced the 10 celebrity contestants competing on the second series of the show. Former AFL player Nick Riewoldt won the series, winning $100,000 for charity Maddie Riewoldt’s Vision.

== Reception ==
=== Ratings ===
Series	Premiere date	Finale date	Episodes	Premiere ratings	Rank	Finale ratings (Grand final)	Rank	Finale ratings (Winner announced)	Rank	Series Average
1	30 September 2009	25 November 2009	10	1.363	2	1.297	1	—N/a		1.187
2	10 October 2021	22 November 2021	13	0.620	6	0.700	6	0.805	5	0.558
