= Golinski =

Golinski (feminine: Golinska) is a surname of Polish origin. Notable people with the surname include:

- Heinz Golinski (1919–1942), German military pilot
- Małgorzata Golińska (born 1980), Polish politician
- Marian Goliński (1949–2009), Polish politician
- Matt Golinski (born 1972), Australian chef
- Michał Goliński (born 1981), Polish footballer

== See also ==
- Golinski v. Office of Personnel Management, a U.S. court case
