= Matt Golinski =

Australian celebrity chef

- Born: 1972 (age 53–54); Australia
- Television: Ready Steady Cook
- Spouse(s): Rachael Golinski (died 2011); Erin Yarwood (married 2017)
- Children: 5 (3 deceased)

Matt Golinski (born c. 1972) is an Australian celebrity chef best known for his regular appearances on the television show Ready Steady Cook.

== Personal life ==
On 26 December 2011, Golinski's wife Rachel and three of his daughters died when his Tewantin home was engulfed by fire in the early morning. Golinski suffered severe burns and, as of March 2012, was still recuperating in Royal Brisbane & Women's Hospital where his condition was listed as "stable". In April 2013, Golinski returned to the public eye, cooking on the stage at the Jan Power Farmer's Market in the Brisbane central business district. In December 2015 a report by Coroner Terry Ryan found that the likely cause of the fire was a power board, or Christmas lights.

The "Plates for Mates" campaign was launched by a number of celebrity chefs on 6 March 2012. The campaign aims to raise money to assist in developing techniques to help heal burns victims.

2013 saw the launch of the "Cruise for Mates" initiative, comprising fundraising cruises to raise money for Golinski and the charities he supports. Two cruises were organised, 'Cruise France' with celebrity chefs Manu Feildel, Janelle Bloom and Alastair McLeod and 'Cruise Europe' with George Calombaris, Gary Mehigan and Damian Heads.

Golinski has two children with second wife, Erin Yarwood.
