= Breed standard =

Written description of what a breed should look like

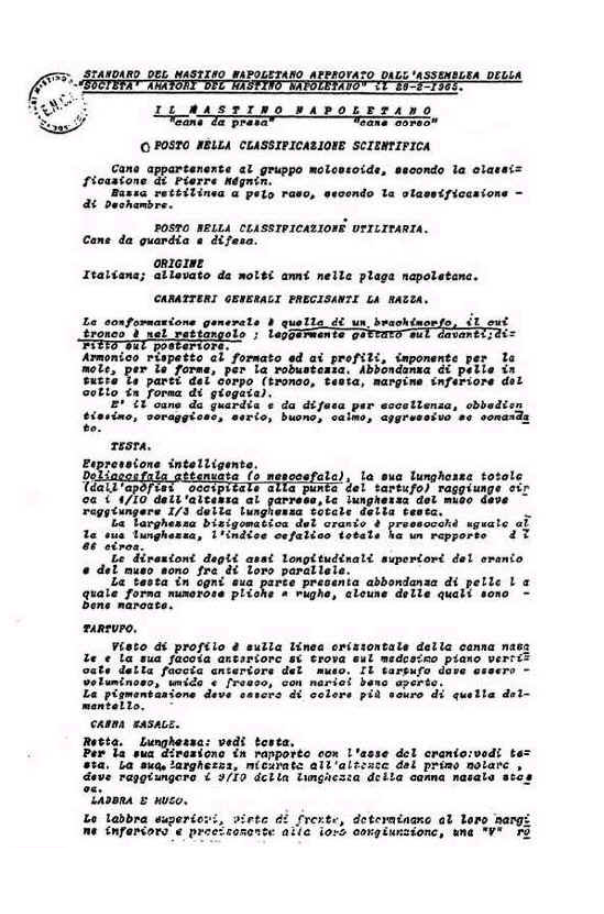
First Neapolitan Mastiff dog breed standard, 1946

In animal husbandry or animal fancy, a breed standard is a description of the characteristics of a hypothetical or ideal example of a breed. The description may include physical or morphological detail, genetic criteria, or criteria of athletic or productive performance. It may also describe faults or deficiencies that would disqualify an animal from registration or from reproduction. The hypothetical ideal example may be called a "breed type".

Breed standards are devised by breed associations or breed clubs, not by individuals, and are written to reflect the use or purpose of the species and breed of the animal. Breed standards help define the ideal animal of a breed and provide goals for breeders in improving stock. In essence a breed standard is a blueprint for an animal fit for the function it was bred - i.e. herding, tracking etc. Breed standards are not scientific documents, and may vary from association to association, and from country to country, even for the same species and breed. There is no one format for breed standards across all species, and breed standards do change and are updated over time.

== Contents of a breed standard ==
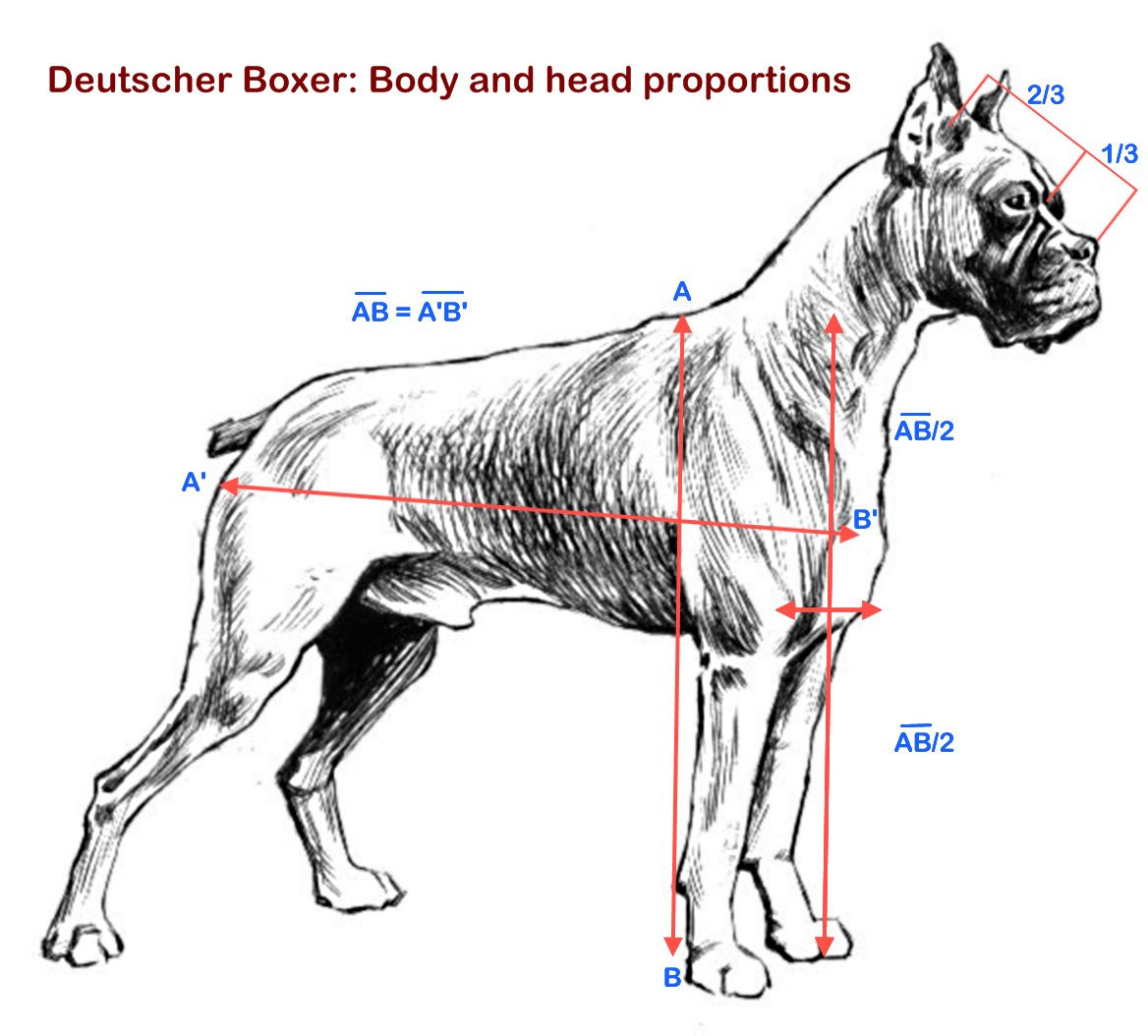
Body and head proportions, Boxer dog breed standard illustration

Breed standards cover the externally observable qualities of the animal such as appearance, movement, and temperament. The exact format of the breed standard varies, as breed standards are not scientific documents and change as the needs of the members of the organization which authors them change. In general, a breed standard may include history of the breed, a narrative description of the breed, and details of the ideal externally observable structure and behavior for the breed. Certain deviations from the standard are considered faults. A large degree of deviation from the breed standard, an excess of faults, or certain defined major faults, may indicate that the animal should not be bred, although its fitness for other uses may not be impeded by the faults. An animal that closely matches (conforms to) the breed standard for its species and breed is said to have good conformation.

== Examples of use ==
In the American Poultry Association breed standards for poultry, for example, ducks and geese are divided by weight, and chicken breeds are divided by size. Chickens are also divided into egg laying, meat, and ornamental varieties. In cattle, breed standards allow for comparisons and the selection of the best breeds to raise. The National Pigeon Association in the U.S. divides breeds into several categories, including form, owl and frills, croppers and pouters, doves, and more. There is breed standard for dogs, cats, horses, chicken breeds, pigeons and others. The standard is used as a comparative parameter for judging animals in conformation shows competitions.

== Regulation ==
Some species have international governing bodies that attempt to regulate the terminology and format of breed standards internationally, but, even where such international agreement exists, not all associations for that species necessarily belong to the international governing body. The Federation Cynologique Internationale regulates breed standards for dogs internationally, but the largest dog registry, the American Kennel Club, does not belong to the international body and uses its own breed standard format.

== See also ==
- Breed type
- Equine conformation
- American Standard of Perfection
- Animal husbandry
- Animal fancy
- Cattle judging
- Selective breeding
- Fault (dog)
