= Dan Hong =

Australian chef, restaurateur and television host

Dan Hong (born 1982) is an Australian chef, restaurateur and television host. He is the executive chef at a number of restaurants under the Merivale company.

== Early life ==
Hong's parents were born in Vietnam. His mother Angie came to Australia under the Colombo Plan to study chemical engineering. His father was a postgraduate electrical engineering student. They subsequently opened a number of Vietnamese restaurants in Sydney called Thanh Binh.

Hong attended Epping West Public School and Barker College but showed little interest in schooling. After attending a cooking school in Chatswood, Hong undertook a traineeship at the InterContinental Hotel and went on to an apprenticeship at Longrain, Pello Restaurant and Marque.

== Career ==
Once qualified, Hong joined Tetsuya's as chef de partie followed by Bentley Restaurant and Bar as sous chef. After working with Wylie Dufresne at wd~50 in New York, he joined Lotus as head chef.

In 2008, Hong won the Josephine Pignolet Young Chef of the Year Award.

Hong is the executive chef at a number of restaurants, including Ms G's, Mr Wong, Papi Chulo and El Loco. Mr. Wong has won multiple awards and hats.

In 2016, Hong was the host of ABC iview series Shelfie which followed him as he ventured inside the kitchens of everyday Australians. Together with Melissa Leong and Mark Olive, Hong is a co-host and judge of the Australian television cooking competition The Chefs' Line. In August 2022 SBS Food screened The Streets with Dan Hong, in which he explores street food from around the world.

== Personal life ==
Dan is married to Rara, who is from Indonesia, and has three children: Namira, Indira, and Omar.

== Publications ==
- Hong, Dan; Leong, Melissa (March 2021). Mr Hong. Murdoch Books. ISBN 9781922351593.
