= Matt Preston =

English and Australian food critic (born 1961)

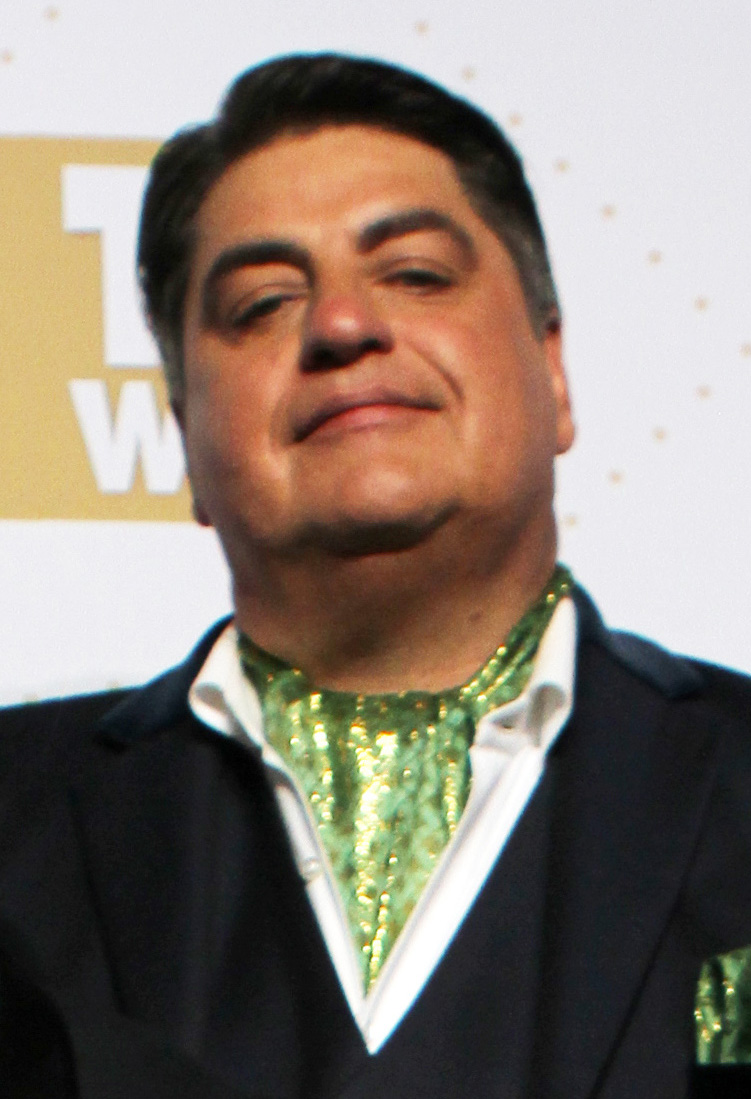
- Preston in 2016
- Born: 21 July 1961 (age 65); London, UK
- Occupations: Food critic; writer; food journalist; television and radio presenter
- Years active: 1990−present
- Spouse: Emma Preston (m. 1999)
- Children: 3

Matt Preston (born 21 July 1961) is an English and Australian food critic, writer, food journalist, television and radio presenter.

Preston has a weekly national food column that appears in NewsCorp's metro newspapers. He is also a senior editor for delicious. and Taste magazines, and the author of at least four best-selling cookbooks.

Previously he was host of Saturday Mornings on ABC Radio Melbourne, judge on Network Ten's MasterChef Australia between 2009 and 2019, and judge on Seven Network's My Kitchen Rules in 2022.

== Early life ==
Preston is the son of British naval historian and journalist Antony Preston. He was born in London, UK, to a Roman Catholic family. From the age of 11 was educated at Worth School, a Benedictine monastic boarding school in West Sussex. He graduated from the University of Kent with a BA Hons in Politics and Government. While growing up in London in the late 1970s, he was a DJ and punk rock musician.

== Career ==
After a few stints working at City Limits and IPC Magazines (TVTimes and What's on TV), Preston relocated to Australia in October 1993. Initially he worked for IPC Magazines as their Australian TV correspondent writing about the soap operas Neighbours and Home and Away for TVTimes, What's on TV and Woman's Own. He subsequently wrote for a number of Australian trade publications owned by IPC's parent company, Reed Business Publishing, including Encore, Supermarket News and Counterpoint.

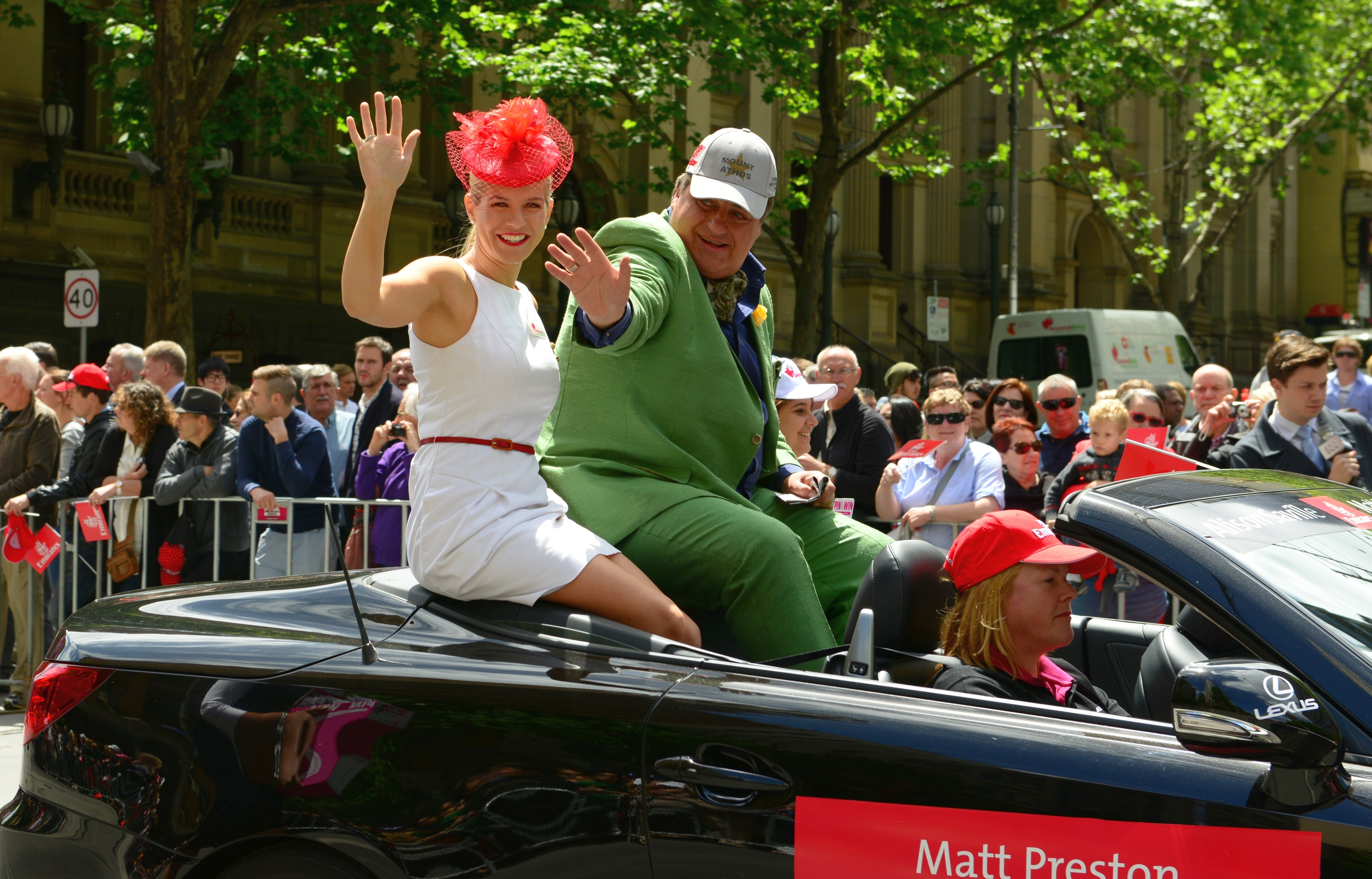
Preston at the 2013 Melbourne Cup Parade

In 1996, Preston started writing reviews for a new Melbourne magazine, Inside Melbourne, a role that he held until he moved on to write reviews for The Age in February 2000. He also worked as a regular food correspondent for a number of publications, including Taste, a supplement in the Herald Sun; The Courier-Mail and The Daily Telegraph (Australia) newspapers; and MasterChef Magazine, delicious. (senior editor), Australian Good Taste (drink reviewer), The Guardian newspaper (UK) and Time Out (London). He was a weekly contributor to Epicure between 2000 and 2009, writing a weekly review of a cafe or restaurant. He also wrote a weekly column in The Age's A2, and was a senior editor at Vogue Entertaining & Travel. Preston has made many appearances on Australian radio.

Today Preston is best known for his stint as a co-host and judge on MasterChef Australia. He also works as a food columnist and regular food correspondent. His weekly national food column appears in NewsCorp's metro newspapers and has a combined reach of over 2.9 million Australians each week. It runs in Stellar magazine every Sunday and in The Adelaide Advertiser. He is also a senior editor for delicious. and Taste magazines.

=== MasterChef Australia ===
In 2009, Preston joined Gary Mehigan and George Calombaris on the judging panel of MasterChef Australia (Network 10), a reality television competition to find Australia's best amateur chef. MasterChef Australia series two, series three and series eleven would go on to win the TV Week Logie for Australia's Best Reality Series.

Preston judged the first eleven series of MasterChef Australia (2009–2019), as well as the first season of Celebrity MasterChef Australia (2009), the first series of Junior MasterChef Australia (2010) and MasterChef Australia All-Stars (2012) with Mehigan and Calombaris. In 2013 he went at it alone to host MasterChef Australia: The Professionals with Marco Pierre White. The show premiered on 20 January 2013 and won the prestigious AACTA for Best Reality Show in the 2014 awards.

Following comments made by Preston about fellow MasterChef Australia judge Marco Pierre White's son, Marco Pierre White Jr, spending $500,000 of his father's money on drugs and prostitution, White stopped making guest appearances on the show after the 8th season and joined the rival programme Hell's Kitchen Australia in retaliation. In 2016, whilst on The Kyle and Jackie O Show, Preston was asked about Marco Pierre White Jr's time on Big Brother UK, which included his alleged on-air sex and the above admission of purchasing illicit drugs and sex work. Preston said: "I think it is that terrible thing when you have kids that go off the rails... the drugs might be a little bit of a worry". White later said of Preston, "I will never forgive that man [Preston]... with my hand on my mother's grave I will get that man." White eventually returned to the programme in season 14, after Preston had left the show.

In 2019, it was announced that Preston, Mehigan and Calombaris would all be leaving the show after eleven years of judging, when Network 10 failed to meet pay rise demands set by the trio. The eleventh season was the last to feature Preston as a judge. It was later announced that chef and former MasterChef winner Andy Allen, food writer and critic Melissa Leong, and chef and restaurateur Jock Zonfrillo would join the series as judges and hosts for the twelfth season in 2020 as replacements for Preston, Calombaris and Mehigan.

=== Other television work ===
Preston has made numerous other appearances on TV shows, including The Project, Good News Week, Studio 10, The Living Room, The Circle, Rove Live, This Week Live, All Star Family Feud and Chris & Julia's Sunday Night Takeaway (all Network 10), ADbc and The Blue List (SBS), Compass (ABC), Today and Postcards (both Nine Network) and Coxy's Big Break (Seven Network). He was chosen as the secret reviewer in the first season of Channel Seven's My Restaurant Rules. Preston has also taken small acting roles on Offspring (Network 10), Lowdown (ABC), The Bold And The Beautiful (Network 10) and Neighbours (Network 10). Previously, he appeared on an episode of Lonely Planet Six Degrees.

On 23 October 2019, it was announced that Preston and fellow MasterChef Australia judge Gary Mehigan would join Manu Feildel in 2020 with a new show called Plate of Origin on Seven Network after the two left Network 10. In 2022, it was announced that Preston would join the twelfth season of Seven Network's My Kitchen Rules as a judge and co-host alongside returning judge Manu Feildel. Preston and international food icon Nigella Lawson were brought in to replace previous judge Pete Evans, who was sacked from the show for making controversial comments.

In August 2022, Preston was revealed to be the Gnome on the fourth season of Network 10's The Masked Singer Australia. He was one of two wildcard contestants, and was introduced in round three. However, he was eliminated the same round after only one performance. In May 2023, he was announced as one of the celebrity contestants competing on the twentieth season of Dancing with the Stars Australia, and was partnered with Jessica Raffa. On 2 July 2023, on the third episode, he withdrew from the series after sustaining an ankle injury during dancing rehearsals, making him the first contestant to leave the competition.

=== Print media ===
Preston has contributed to Australia's leading glossy food magazines, writing about restaurants, chefs and leading culinary destinations. The role has taken him to more than 30 regions across Australia and the world.

He began regularly contributing to the Epicure food section of The Age in February 2000. He wrote a weekly review of a cafe or ethnic eatery in his 'Unexplored' column in Epicure. In 2009 he wrote a weekly column in The Age on Saturday's A2 section. Preston also contributes cover stories to Epicure, for which he has won a number of awards.

=== Other professional roles ===
- Creative director, Melbourne Food and Wine Festival (2004–2009)
- Contributor, The Age Good Food Guide; Food and Wine (US)
- Five years as national chief judge for Restaurant and Catering's National Awards for Excellence
- Contributing drink editor, Good Taste magazine
- Secret reviewer on Seven Network's My Restaurant Rules (series one)
- Judge in The World's Best 50 Restaurants Awards
- Saturday Mornings radio presenter on ABC Radio Melbourne (2022-2024)

== Books ==
- Cravat-A-Licious (2009) (ISBN 978-1-741-66967-1)
- Matt Preston's 100 Best Recipes (2012) (ISBN 978-1-743-28339-4)
- Matt Preston's Fast Fresh and Unbelievably Delicious (2013) (ISBN 978-1-742-61258-4)
- Matt Preston's Cook Book (2014) (ISBN 978-1-743-53118-1)
- Matt Preston's Simple Secrets (2015) (ISBN 978-1-743-53327-7)
- Matt Preston's Yummy, Easy, Quick (2017) (ISBN 978-1-760-55264-0)
- Big Mouth (2023) ISBN 978-1-761-04445-8

== Accolades ==
Preston has won a number of awards, both individually and as the leader of an organisation, including:

- 2003 Food Media Club of Australia Grand Marnier Award for Best New Writer Winner: Matt Preston for articles published in the Epicure section of The Age
- 2004 Food Media Club of Australia Australian Mushroom Growers' Award Best Food Article Winner: Matt Preston for "The Temple Kitchen", Epicure, The Age
- 2006 Food Media Club of Australia Calypso Mango Award for Best Recipe Feature in a Newspaper or Newspaper Magazine Winner: Matt Preston for "Preserving knowledge", Epicure, The Age
- 2008 Le Cordon Bleu World Food Media Awards, Food Journalist of the Year for articles in delicious. magazine and the Epicure section of The Age
- 2010 The Graham Kennedy Award for Most Outstanding New Talent (Male)
- 2011 Nickelodeon Kids Choice Awards Winner – Awesome Oldie
- Preston appears in Who's Who in Australia 2011 edition
