= Celebrity MasterChef Australia series 2 =

Australian television series season

Celebrity MasterChef Australia
- Season 2
- Celebrity MasterChef Australia series 2 logo
- Judges: Andy Allen; Melissa Leong; Jock Zonfrillo
- No. of contestants: 10
- Winner: Nick Riewoldt
- Runner-up: Tilly Ramsay
- No. of episodes: 13

Release
- Original network: Network Ten
- Original release: 10 October – 22 November 2021

Additional information
- Filming dates: 15 July 2021

Series chronology
- ← Previous; Series 1

The second series of the Australian cooking game show Celebrity MasterChef Australia premiered on 10 October 2021. Andy Allen, Melissa Leong and Jock Zonfrillo reprised their roles as judges from the main series of the show.

Former AFL player Nick Riewoldt won the series, winning $100,000 for the charity Maddie Riewoldt’s Vision.

== Contestants ==
In May 2021, Network Ten announced that the celebrity cooks would include a legendary sports person, an Aussie icon and a famous actor.

On 17 June 2021, Network Ten announced the ten celebrity contestants competing on the second series of the show.

Contestant	Age	Occupation	Status
Nick Riewoldt	38	Former AFL footballer	Winner 22 November
Tilly Ramsay	19	TV presenter	Runner-Up 22 November
Collette Dinnigan	55	Fashion designer	Third Place 22 November
Rebecca Gibney	56	Actress	Eliminated 15 November
Dilruk Jayasinha	36	Comedian	Eliminated 15 November
Archie Thompson	42	Former soccer player	Eliminated 14 November
Ian Thorpe	38	Olympic swimming champion	Eliminated 7 November
Matthew Le Nevez	42	Actor	Eliminated 31 October
Dami Im	32	Singer	Eliminated 24 October
Chrissie Swan	47	Television and radio broadcaster	Eliminated 17 October

== Guest Chefs ==
Week	Guest Chef	Challenge
2	Gordon Ramsay	Elimination Challenge
3	Curtis Stone	Team/Elimination Challenge
4	Heston Blumenthal	Immunity Challenge
6	Hugh Allen	Elimination Challenge
Finale	Martin Benn	Grand Finale

== Elimination chart ==
No.	Week	1		2	3	4	5	6		Finals
No.	Immunity Challenge	Dilruk (Immunity Pin)		Collette	Tilly	Nick; Rebecca	Nick	Rebecca	None	
No.	All-In Elimination Winner	Archie; Dami; Nick; Rebecca; Tilly			Archie; Collette; Rebecca; Ian	Archie; Collette; Ian	Rebecca; Tilly	Collette; Dilruk; Nick; Tilly	None	
1	Nick	IN		WIN	Team Lose	IMM	IMM	Top 4	Top 3	WINNER
2	Tilly	IN		Top 5	IMM	Btm 3	Top 2	Top 4	Top 3	Runner-up
3	Collette	Top 4		IMM	Team Win	Top 3	Btm 4	Top 4	Top 3	Third-place
4	Dilruk	WIN	I.P.	Btm 3/Imm.	Team Lose	Btm 3	Btm 4	Top 4	Elim	Eliminated (Ep 12)
4	Rebecca	IN		Top 5	Team Win	IMM	Top 2	IMM	Elim	Eliminated (Ep 12)
6	Archie	IN		Top 5	Team Win	Top 3	Btm 4	Elim	Eliminated (Ep 11)	
7	Ian	IN		Btm 2	Team Win	Top 3	Elim	Eliminated (Ep 9)		
8	Matt	IN		Btm 4	Team Lose	Elim	Eliminated (Ep 7)			
9	Dami	Top 4		Top 5	Elim	Eliminated (Ep 5)				
10	Chrissie	Top 4		Elim	Eliminated (Ep 3)					
	Eliminated			Chrissie	Dami	Matt	Ian	Archie	Dilruk; Rebecca	Collette; 30 points
	Eliminated			Chrissie	Dami	Matt	Ian	Archie	Dilruk; Rebecca	Tilly; 34 points
	Eliminated			Chrissie	Dami	Matt	Ian	Archie	Dilruk; Rebecca	Nick; 38 points

== Episodes and ratings ==
Ep#	Original airdate	Episode Title / Event	Total viewers (five metro cities)	Nightly ranking	Ref.
Week 1
1	Sunday, 10 October 2021	Opening Night: Signature Dish – The ten celebrities had 90 minutes to cook the dish for which they were 'famous'. The contestant who cooked the best dish would win the only immunity pin of the season. Dami, Collette, Dilruk and Chrissie were named as being in the Top 4 before Dilruk was announced as the winner of the immunity pin.	620,000	6	
2	Monday, 11 October 2021	Immunity Challenge: Comfort Food – The contestants had 75 minutes to cook their favourite 'comfort food'. Collette, Nick, Tilly and Rebecca were names as being in the Top 4 contestants before Collette was announced as having produced the best dish and winning the first weekly immunity of the season. The other contestants were sent to the elimination challenge.	601,000	10	
Week 2
3	Sunday, 17 October 2021	Elimination Challenge: Bacon and Eggs – Gordon Ramsay set the first elimination challenge of the season via a live stream. In the first round, the contestants had 60 minutes to cook a dish using eggs. Nick impressed the judges with his dippy eggs, which were perfectly cooked, and was named as the best dish. Chrissie, Dilruk and Ian were sent to the second round where they had 60 minutes to cook another dish using bacon. During the last 30 seconds, Dilruk played his immunity pin so his dish wasn't tasted by the judges. Chrissie's quiche lorraine had raw pastry on the bottom and, as a result, she was the first contestant eliminated from the competition.	561,000	7	
4	Monday, 18 October 2021	Beauty and the Beast Immunity Mystery Box – In the first mystery box challenge of the season, the contestants could choose between a beauty mystery box, with 60 minutes of cooking time, or the additional beast mystery box, with 75 minutes of cooking time. All contestants could open the beauty mystery box but those who also opened the beast mystery box had to cook with it. Ian and Tilly were named in the top two for their scallop dishes but Tilly won weekly immunity because she had the better presentation.	588,000	10	
Week 3
5	Sunday, 24 October 2021	Curtis Stone's Team Relay Challenge – The celebrities are split into two teams and Curtis Stone revealed mango as the feature ingredient for the relay challenge. The Pink team, led by Ian, won against the Red team, led by Nick, despite the chaos that ensued among them as Red team's fish was overcooked and their coconut rice texture was not right. In the second round, Nick, Dilruk, Dami and Matt from the losing Red team had to cook a sweet dish in 60 minutes. Nick, Matt and Dilruk impressed the judges with their desserts and were declared safe. Dami had an undercooked Basque cheesecake due to the time constraints, thus making her the second contestant eliminated from the competition.	573,000	6	
6	Monday, 25 October 2021	Service Challenge - Immunity Challenge – The celebrities are split into four teams of two. Each team must cook a dish and serve it to 20 diners plus the judges in their very first service challenge at Starward distillery in Port Melbourne. Nick and Rebecca were revealed as the winners of the challenge and won immunity from next Sunday's elimination.	527,000	12	
Week 4
7	Sunday, 31 October 2021	Elimination Challenge – Tonight's elimination challenge is a two rounder, starting off with a classic MasterChef taste test. The ingredients from the round one taste test make up the pantry for round two!	421,000	8	
8	Monday, 1 November 2021	Immunity Challenge – Heston Blumenthal explains to the remaining celebrities how nostalgia is so important to the way he cooks, and challenges them to cook a dish that takes them back to their childhood.	446,000	14	
Week 5
9	Sunday, 7 November 2021	Elimination Challenge – Two most important things in MasterChef kitchen are time and ingredients. The celebrities have four pantries to choose from. One pantry is revealed every 10 minutes in tonight's elimination challenge.	395,000	9	
10	Monday, 8 November 2021	Immunity Challenge – The judges reveal that today the celebrities are going to have to keep up with Jock and replicate his dish as well as they can without a recipe or dish to reference.	477,000	14	
Week 6
11	Sunday, 14 November 2021	Finals Week: Elimination Challenge – The celebrities have 2.5 hours to prepare 12 dishes and 30 minutes to serve. Tonight, is an elimination, so whoever serves the least impressive course will be knocked out of the competition!	545,000	4	
12	Monday, 15 November 2021	Finals Week: Double Elimination Challenge – In tonight's challenge the judges have decided to be generous and throw out the rules, they want to see a dish that is the culmination of everything the celebrities have learnt so far.	557,000	9	
Week 7
13	Monday, 22 November 2021	Grand Finale – Celebrity MasterChef grand finale! They are playing for the title, trophy and most importantly $100,000 for their charity. The dish that will seal their fate is set by culinary legend, Martin Benn.	700,000	6	
13	Monday, 22 November 2021	Winner Announced – Nick was crowned the winner after he scored 38 out 40 points, defeating Tilly on 34 points and Collette on 30 points.	805,000	5	

Preceded by MasterChef Australia (series 13)	MasterChef Australia spin-off 10 October 2021 – 22 November 2021	Succeeded by MasterChef Australia (series 14)
