= My Kitchen Rules series 12 =

Series of television show

My Kitchen Rules
- Series 12
- Starring: Manu Feildel; Nigella Lawson; Matt Preston; Colin Fassnidge; Curtis Stone; Gary Mehigan
- No. of episodes: 16

Release
- Original network: Seven Network
- Original release: 7 August – 31 August 2022

Season chronology
- ← Previous; Series 11 (2020) Next → Series 13 (2023)

The twelfth season of the Australian competitive cooking competition show My Kitchen Rules, with the motto Share the love, premiered on the Seven Network on 7 August 2022.

Applications for contestants opened during the airing of the end of 2021, after a one-year break in 2021. In December 2021, Feildel was announced to be returning as a judge. In April 2022, it was announced Nigella Lawson and Matt Preston will be joining the series as judges alongside Feildel with Colin Fassnidge and Curtis Stone appearing as guest judges. Although not previously announced, Gary Mehigan will also be a guest judge.

The start date for the season was confirmed as 7 August 2022, after the Commonwealth Games.

== Format changes ==
- Judges - This season, Manu Feildel is the series judge alongside Nigella Lawson or Matt Preston in the Instant Restaurant Rounds, with Colin Fassnidge, Gary Mehigan and Curtis Stone appearing as guest judges in the Final Week.
- Rules - This season, the rules returned to the MKR's original format, without houses divided as seen in MKR: The Rivals version and it will be States vs States.
  - Instant Restaurant Round - The format is like the original Instant Restaurant Round. However, there is a twist this season: The highest scoring team at the end of the round will advance directly to the Semi Final, while the lowest scoring team will be eliminated.
  - Last Chance Cook Off - The rest 4 teams from each Instant Restaurant group have to plate a main and a dessert for Colin, Curtis, Gary as well as the other group in this round. The winning team will be decided by the judge and will be advanced to the Semi-Final, while the other 3 will be eliminated.
  - Semi-Final - Instead of the previous format where there will be two Semi-finals to choose the Grand Finalist, this season only had one with two rounds to eliminate two out of four teams to decide the finalists.

== Teams ==
Hometown/State		Group	Members	Relationship	Status
Kingsgrove	NSW	1	Janelle & Monzir	Dating	Winners 31 August (Grand Finale)
Jimboomba	QLD	1	Kate & Mary	Fine Diners	Runners-up 31 August (Grand Finale)
Bronte	NSW	2	Sophie & Katherine	Posh Friends	Eliminated 30 August (Semi-Final Round 2)
Buxton	VIC	2	Matt & KT	Best Friends	Eliminated 30 August (Semi-Final Round 1)
Albany	WA	2	Che & Dave	Chilli Mates	Eliminated 29 August (Last Chance Cook Off: Round 2)
Point Cook	VIC	2	Leanne & Milena	Italian Sisters	Eliminated 29 August (Last Chance Cook Off: Round 2)
Adelaide	SA	2	Nicky & Jose	Spanish Foodies & Dating Longterm	Eliminated 29 August (Last Chance Cook Off: Round 2)
Chewton	VIC	1	Peter & Alice	Dad & Daughter	Eliminated 28 August (Last Chance Cook Off: Round 1)
Vaucluse	NSW	1	Arrnott & Fuzz	Fashionista Friends	Eliminated 28 August (Last Chance Cook Off: Round 1)
Margaret River	WA	1	Ashlee & Mat	Foodie Parents	Eliminated 28 August (Last Chance Cook Off: Round 1)
Brisbane	QLD	2	Rosie & Hayley	Aunt & Niece	Eliminated 24 August (Instant Restaurant: Round 2)
Adelaide	SA	1	Steven & Frena	Engaged	Eliminated 15 August (Instant Restaurant: Round 1)

== Elimination history ==
Teams' Competition Progress
Round:	Instant Restaurants		Last Chance Cook Off		Semi-Final		Grand Finale
Round:	1	2	1	2	1	2	Grand Finale
Teams:	Progress						
Janelle & Monzir	2nd (84)	—N/a	Win	—N/a	Safe	Win	Winners (27)
Kate & Mary	1st (87)	—N/a	→		Safe	Safe	Runners-up (25)
Sophie & Katherine	—N/a	1st (95)	→		Safe	Lose	Eliminated (Episode 15)
Matt & KT	—N/a	4th (66)	—N/a	Win	Lose	Eliminated (Episode 15)	
Che & Dave	—N/a	3rd (77)	—N/a	Lose (2nd)	Eliminated (Episode 14)		
Leanne & Milena	—N/a	2nd (87)	—N/a	Lose (3rd)	Eliminated (Episode 14)		
Nicky & Jose	—N/a	5th (62)	—N/a	Lose (4th)	Eliminated (Episode 14)		
Peter & Alice	5th (54)	—N/a	Lose (2nd)	Eliminated (Episode 13)			
Arrnott & Fuzz	3rd (81)	—N/a	Lose (3rd)	Eliminated (Episode 13)			
Ashlee & Mat	4th (69)	—N/a	Lose (4th)	Eliminated (Episode 13)			
Rosie & Hayley	—N/a	6th (57)	Eliminated (Episode 12)				
Steven & Frena	6th (53)	Eliminated (Episode 6)					

Cell Descriptions
	Team won a challenge, cooked the best dish or received the highest score for the round.
Safe	Team was safe from elimination after passing a challenge/round.
→	Team continued to next the challenge/round.
	Team was eliminated after losing in a Cook-Off or round.

== Competition details ==
=== Instant Restaurants ===
During the Instant Restaurant rounds, each team hosts a three-course dinner for judges and fellow teams in their allocated group. They are scored and ranked among their group. The highest scoring team at the end of the round will advance directly to the Semi Final, while the lowest scoring team will be eliminated.

==== Round 1 ====
- Episodes 1 to 6
- Airdate — 7 August to 15 August
- Description — The first of the two instant restaurant groups are introduced into the competition in Round 1, with the entrance of new judge: Nigella Lawson. The highest scoring team at the end of the round will advance directly to the Semi Final, while the lowest scoring team will be eliminated.

Instant Restaurant Summary
Group 1
Team and Episode Details		Guest Scores						Manu's Scores			Nigella's Scores			Total (out of 110)	Rank	Result
Team and Episode Details		P&A	K&M	S&F	J&M	A&F	A&M	Entrée	Main	Dessert	Entrée	Main	Dessert	Total (out of 110)	Rank	Result
VIC	Peter & Alice	—	4	5	6	5	6	5	8	1	5	8	1	54	5th	Safe
Ep 1	7 Aug	The Antiques Food Show														Safe
Dishes	Entrée	Sunday Roast Croquette with Grandma's Relish														Safe
Dishes	Main	Parmesan Crumbed Lamb Cutlets														Safe
Dishes	Dessert	Grandma's Lemon Delicious Pudding														Safe
QLD	Kate & Mary	8	—	7	7	7	8^{1}	7	9	9	7	9	9	87	1st	Through to Semi Final
Ep 2	8 Aug	The Food Gallery														Through to Semi Final
Dishes	Entrée	Wild Barramundi, Braised Leek and Beurre Noisette														Through to Semi Final
Dishes	Main	Brisbane Valley Quail with Fig & Goat Curd Salad														Through to Semi Final
Dishes	Dessert	Macadamia Tart with Saffron Poached Pear														Through to Semi Final
SA	Steven & Frena	4	5	—	6	5	5^{1}	5	8	1	5	8	1	53	6th	Eliminated
Ep 3	9 Aug	Sayang														Eliminated
Dishes	Entrée	Deep Fried Squid & Onion with Special Sauce														Eliminated
Dishes	Main	Black Beef with Golden Yellow Rice and Acar														Eliminated
Dishes	Dessert	Corn Pudding with Strawberries and Chocolate Sauce														Eliminated
NSW	Janelle & Monzir	8	7	7	—	8	7	10	6	8	10	5	8	84	2nd	Safe
Ep 4	10 Aug	Monzelle														Safe
Dishes	Entrée	Sudanese Lamb Cutlets with Peanut Sauce and Cucumber Salad														Safe
Dishes	Main	Imam Bayildi														Safe
Dishes	Dessert	Chocolate and Peanut Layer Cake														Safe
NSW	Arrnott & Fuzz	9	7	5	7	—	9	6	8	7	7	8	8	81	3rd	Safe
Ep 5	14 Aug	Mai Kana														Safe
Dishes	Entrée	Kokoda with Root Crop Crisps														Safe
Dishes	Main	Fijian Lobster Curry with Coconut Rice and Island Salsa														Safe
Dishes	Dessert	Vudi Vakasoso with Coconut Ice Cream														Safe
WA	Ashlee & Mat	8	7	3	6	6	—	9	6	5	9	6	4	69	4th	Safe
Ep 6	15 Aug	The Kitchen Bench														Safe
Dishes	Entrée	Marron Bisque with Shaved Asparagus														Safe
Dishes	Main	Venison with Romesco														Safe
Dishes	Dessert	Oliebollen														Safe

Note

^1 Due to medical problems, Mat cannot attend the Instant Restaurants in these episodes so Ashlee is the only one to represent the team and judge other teams' meal.

==== Round 2 ====
- Episodes 7 to 12
- Airdate — 16 August to 24 August
- Description — The second of the two instant restaurant groups are introduced into the competition in Round 2, with the entrance of new judge: Matt Preston. The highest scoring team at the end of the round will advance directly to the Semi Final, while the lowest scoring team will be eliminated.

Instant Restaurant Summary
Group 2
Team and Episode Details		Guest Scores						Manu's Scores			Matt's Scores			Total (out of 110)	Rank	Result
Team and Episode Details		C&D	S&K	R&H	N&J	M&K	L&M	Entrée	Main	Dessert	Entrée	Main	Dessert	Total (out of 110)	Rank	Result
WA	Che & Dave	—	6	6	8	6	7	8	10	5	7	9	5	77	3rd	Safe
Ep 7	16 Aug	The Scoville														Safe
Dishes	Entrée	Hot & Sour Tom Yum Soup														Safe
Dishes	Main	Crispy Skin Barramundi with Hot Thai Green Curry Sauce and Garlic Rice														Safe
Dishes	Dessert	Poached Nashi Pear with Watermelon, Peanuts and Chilli Syrup														Safe
NSW	Sophie & Katherine	7	—	8	8	9	8	10	7	10	10	8	10	95	1st	Through to Semi Final
Ep 8	17 Aug	Hearth														Through to Semi Final
Dishes	Entrée	Twice-cooked Octopus with Green Romesco and Jamon Crumb														Through to Semi Final
Dishes	Main	Roast Spatchcock with 'Nduja, Fresh Corn Polenta and Grilled Radicchio														Through to Semi Final
Dishes	Dessert	Fig Leaf Semifreddo with Grilled Figs and Pedro Ximénez														Through to Semi Final
QLD	Rosie & Hayley	5	5	—	7	7	5	5	2	6	6	3	6	57	6th	Eliminated
Ep 9	21 Aug	Lioness														Eliminated
Dishes	Entrée	Meatballs in Tomato Sauce with Homemade Bread														Eliminated
Dishes	Main	Roasted Pumpkin and Sweet Potato Risotto														Eliminated
Dishes	Dessert	Vanilla Cake with Buttercream and Caramel Sauce														Eliminated
SA	Nicky & Jose	5	5	8	—	6	5	7	5	4	7	6	4	62	5th	Safe
Ep 10	22 Aug	The Sexy Spaniard														Safe
Dishes	Entrée	Tortilla de Patatas														Safe
Dishes	Main	Paella														Safe
Dishes	Dessert	Churros with Chocolate Sauce														Safe
VIC	Matt & KT	6	7	5	6	—	5	4	8	5	6	8	6	66	4th	Safe
Ep 11	23 Aug	Jardilgurah														Safe
Dishes	Entrée	Buttermilk Fried Crocodile with Aniseed Myrtle Slaw														Safe
Dishes	Main	Kangaroo Loin with Parsnip and Saltbush Puree and Pepperberry Jus														Safe
Dishes	Dessert	Kakadu Plum Ice Cream with Bushtucker Brittle														Safe
VIC	Leanne & Milena	8	8	8	9	8	—	10	8	4	10	9	5	87	2nd	Safe
Ep 12	24 Aug	Piccola Calabria														Safe
Dishes	Entrée	Arancini														Safe
Dishes	Main	Spaghetti with Salsiccia and Rapini														Safe
Dishes	Dessert	Woodfire Chocolate Hazelnut Calzone														Safe

=== Last Chance Cook Off ===
==== Round 1 ====
- Episodes 13
- Airdate — 28 August
- Description — The remaining teams from the first Instant Restaurant Round have to prepare a main and a dessert for the two judges Curtis Stone and Colin Fassnidge as well as members of group 2. After the round, the judges will decide the winning team to join Mary and Kate and Sophie and Katherine in the Semi-Final.

Last Chance Cook Off Summary
Team		Dish		Result
NSW	Janelle & Monzir	Main	Tavuk with Muhammara	Through to Semi-Final
NSW	Janelle & Monzir	Dessert	Middle Eastern Inspired Three-Milk Cake	Through to Semi-Final
VIC	Peter & Alice	Main	Brisket and Marrow Meatloaf with Rich Tomato Sauce and Mash	Eliminated
VIC	Peter & Alice	Dessert	Lemon Curd Roulade with Rhubarb and Pistachios	Eliminated
NSW	Arrnott & Fuzz	Main	Fijian Chicken Palau with Tomato Chutney and Spiced Yoghurt	Eliminated
NSW	Arrnott & Fuzz	Dessert	Fijian Halwa with Galgura and Masala Tea	Eliminated
WA	Ashlee & Mat	Main	Sri Lankan Fish Curry with Coconut Rice	Eliminated
WA	Ashlee & Mat	Dessert	Apple Tarte Tatin	Eliminated

==== Round 2 ====
- Episodes 14
- Airdate — 29 August
- Description — The remaining teams from the second Instant Restaurant Round have to prepare a main and a dessert for the two judges Gary Mehigan and Colin Fassnidge as well as members of group 1. After the round, the judges will decide the winning team to join Mary and Kate, Sophie and Katherine and Janelle and Monzir in the Semi-Final.

Last Chance Cook Off Summary
Team		Dish		Result
VIC	Matt & KT	Main	Warrigal Greens Gnocchi with Cinnamon Myrtle Burnt Butter Sauce	Through to Semi-Final
VIC	Matt & KT	Dessert	Finger Lime Cheesecake with Blackberry Coulis	Through to Semi-Final
WA	Che & Dave	Main	Pork Fillet with Fondant Potatoes and Port & Red Wine Jus	Eliminated
WA	Che & Dave	Dessert	Poached Nashi Pears with Chocolate Sauce and Toasted Peanuts	Eliminated
VIC	Leanne & Milena	Main	Pasta Marinara	Eliminated
VIC	Leanne & Milena	Dessert	Fritelli Dolce with Frangelico Chocolate Sauce	Eliminated
SA	Nicky & Jose	Main	Pescado a la Vasca	Eliminated
SA	Nicky & Jose	Dessert	Spanish Flan	Eliminated

=== Semi-final ===
- Episodes 15
- Airdate — 30 August
- Description — The remaining teams had first to prepare an entree, however the team with the worst entree was eliminated, leaving the remaining three teams to create a main and a dessert for the two judges Manu Feildel and Curtis Stone. The top two teams with the best main and dessert were sent to the Grand Final.

Semi-final Summary
Team		Dish		Result
Round 1: Entree
NSW	Janelle & Monzir	Entree	Turkish Manti	Through to round 2
QLD	Kate & Mary	Entree	Beef Carpaccio	Through to round 2
NSW	Sophie & Katherine	Entree	Risotto	Through to round 2
VIC	Matt & KT	Entree	King Prawns with Bush Tucker Dukkah and River Mint Yoghurt	Eliminated
Round 2: Main & Dessert
QLD	Kate & Mary	Main	Duck Breast with Caramelised Radiccio and Potato Dauphinois	Through to Grand Finale
QLD	Kate & Mary	Dessert	Tahini Creme Brulee	Through to Grand Finale
NSW	Janelle & Monzir	Main	Lamb Backstrap with Kisir and Ezme Salad	Through to Grand Finale
NSW	Janelle & Monzir	Dessert	Panna Cotta	Through to Grand Finale
NSW	Sophie & Katherine	Main	Crispy Pork Belly with Parsnip Puree and Roast Pear	Eliminated
NSW	Sophie & Katherine	Dessert	Quince and Sour Cream Tart	Eliminated

=== Grand Finale ===
- Episodes 16
- Airdate — 31 August
- Description — Janelle & Monzir took on Kate & Mary in this Grand Final. They had to cook a four-course meal for the judges, the eliminated teams and their family and friends, 25 plates per course. The judges including Manu, Colin and Curtis scored each set of 4 meals out of 10 for the final verdict.

Grand Final
Team		Manu's Scores	Colin's Scores	Curtis's Scores	Total (out of 30)	Result
NSW	Janelle & Monzir	9	9	9	27	Winners
Dishes		Monzelle				Winners
Entrée		Grilled Adena with Cajik, Sumac & Onion Salad and Bazlama				Winners
Seafood Course		Kataifi Prawn with Halloumi & Watermelon Salad				Winners
Meat Course		Sudanese Beef & Okra Stew with Kisra, Torshi and Shata				Winners
Dessert		Baklava with Kaymak Ice Cream and Candied Walnuts				Winners
QLD	Kate & Mary	9	8	8	25	Runners-up
Dishes		The Food Gallery				Runners-up
Entrée		Scampi with Smoky Chilli Oil, Gazpacho and Fennel Salad				Runners-up
Seafood Course		Crispy Skin Salmon with Fragrant Thai Sauce and Flatbread				Runners-up
Meat Course		Lamb, Grain and Salsa Verde				Runners-up
Dessert		Lemon Tart with Thyme Infused Labneh and Candied Lemon				Runners-up

== Ratings ==
Colour Key:
– Highest Rating
– Lowest Rating
– Elimination Episode
– Finals Week

Week	Episode		Air date	Viewers (millions) (Note: Ratings data used is from OzTAM and represents the live and same day average viewership from the 5 largest Australian metropolitan centres (Sydney, Melbourne, Brisbane, Perth and Adelaide).)	Nightly rank	Source
1	1	Instant Restaurant 1-1: Peter & Alice	Sunday, 7 August	0.503	8	
1	2	Instant Restaurant 1-2: Kate & Mary	Monday, 8 August	0.408	16	
1	3	Instant Restaurant 1-3: Steven & Frena	Tuesday, 9 August	0.450	12	
1	4	Instant Restaurant 1-4: Janelle & Monzir	Wednesday, 10 August	0.471	10	
2	5	Instant Restaurant 1-5: Arrnott & Fuzz	Sunday, 14 August	0.500	7	
2	6	Instant Restaurant 1-6: Ashlee & Mat	Monday, 15 August	0.513	13	
2	7	Instant Restaurant 2-1: Che & Dave	Tuesday, 16 August	0.436	13	
2	8	Instant Restaurant 2-2: Sophie & Katherine	Wednesday, 17 August	0.470	11	
3	9	Instant Restaurant 2-3: Rosie & Hayley	Sunday, 21 August	0.522	8	
3	10	Instant Restaurant 2-4: Nicky & Jose	Monday, 22 August	0.472	15	
3	11	Instant Restaurant 2-5: Matt & KT	Tuesday, 23 August	0.468	11	
3	12	Instant Restaurant 2-6: Leanne & Milena	Wednesday, 24 August	0.466	12	
4	13	Last Chance Cook Off 1	Sunday, 28 August	0.428	10	
4	14	Last Chance Cook Off 2	Monday, 29 August	0.484	12	
4	15	Semi Final	Tuesday, 30 August	0.478	10	
4	16	Grand Final	Wednesday, 31 August	0.528	9	
4	16	Grand Final - Winner Announced	Wednesday, 31 August	0.643	6	
