= Candy Devine =

Australian actress and singer (1938 or 1939 – 2024)

Candy Devine MBE
- Born: Faye Ann Guivarra; November 4, 1938; Cairns, Queensland, Australia
- Died: October 31, 2024 (aged 85); Australia
- Occupation: Actress, singer, radio broadcaster
- Years active: 1970–2013
- Spouse: Donald McLeod (m. 1970; died 2012)
- Children: 4, including Alastair McLeod

Faye Ann McLeod, MBE (née Guivarra, 1938 or 1939 – October 2024), better known by the stage name of Candy Devine, was an Australian broadcaster, singer, and actress. She was a radio broadcaster and singer in Northern Ireland for over 35 years.

== Early years ==
Faye Ann Guivarra was born in Cairns to a sugar-farming family. She was of Spanish, Sri Lankan, Filipino, English, Danish, Norwegian and Torres Strait Islander heritage. Her parents were co-founders of the Cairns music group, the Tropical Troubadours, and later established the city's Coloured Social Club.

She was educated at St Augustine's School, East Innisfail, a boarding school from 1948 – she provided "incidental music and accompaniments" at their 1952 break-up ceremony. For secondary education she attended Brisbane's Lourdes Hill College from the early 1950s. She furthered her interest in music while at college. Later she studied piano and cello at Queensland Conservatorium before taking to the stage in Sydney.

Her appearances in Australian television include the series Skippy the Bush Kangaroo (1968) and fronting ABC's In Key.

== Life in Ireland ==
Devine travelled to Ireland in 1969 on what was intended to be a short visit. She was hired for a cabaret slot at the Talk of the Town club in Belfast. She married her promoter and booking agent, Donald McLeod, in Dublin in 1970. They lived in the Republic of Ireland for five years and moved to Belfast in Northern Ireland in 1975.

Devine began a long career with Downtown Radio in March 1976. They had four children, including Brisbane-based celebrity chef, Alastair McLeod. Devine was appointed a Member of the Order of the British Empire (MBE) in the 2014 New Year Honours for "services to Broadcasting and to the Community in Northern Ireland".

== Return to Australia ==
Devine moved back to Australia in 2013 following the death of her husband the previous year. As of September 2016 she lived in Brisbane, sharing a five-acre property with her son, Alastair and his family.

Devine died in Australia in October 2024, at the age of 85.
