= The Chefs' Line =

- Genre: Cooking show
- Created by: Chris Culvenor
- Directed by: Kate Douglas-Walker; Nick Davies
- Presented by: Maeve O'Meara; Melissa Leong
- Judges: Melissa Leong; Dan Hong; Mark Olive
- Country of origin: Australia
- Original language: English
- No. of seasons: 2
- No. of episodes: 116

Production
- Executive producers: Emily Griggs; Alenka Henry
- Producers: Jessica Tandurella; Peter Faherty
- Camera setup: Multi-camera
- Running time: 30 minutes
- Production company: Eureka Productions

Original release
- Network: SBS
- Release: 3 April 2017 – 12 October 2018

The Chefs' Line is an Australian reality competitive cooking show. The series features four home cooks in each episode who compete against professional chefs in a studio kitchen. The challenge is to create their personal versions of a chosen dish from the week's featured cuisine. Dishes are then blind-tasted and judged by executive chef Dan Hong, food writer Melissa Leong, and chef Mark Olive. The contestants are eliminated until the week's winner is chosen. On the fifth night, Maeve O’Meara goes into the kitchen of the week's featured restaurant to uncover their culinary secrets.

== See also ==
- List of Australian television series
- List of cooking shows
- List of programs broadcast by Special Broadcasting Service
