= Good Food & Wine Show =

Australian exhibition

- Status: Active
- Venue: Sydney Olympic Park, Melbourne Convention & Exhibition Centre, Brisbane Convention & Exhibition Centre & Perth Convention Exhibition Centre
- Locations: Sydney, Melbourne, Brisbane & Perth
- Country: Australia
- Inaugurated: 2001
- Attendance: 120,600 combined (approx)
- Organizer: Talk2 Media & Events
- Website: http://www.goodfoodshow.com.au/

The Good Food & Wine Show is Australia's largest consumer exhibition. It showcases cuisine matches and celebrity chefs.

The event is staged annually in Melbourne, Sydney, Perth and Brisbane.

== History ==
The inaugural Good Food & Wine Show was staged in Melbourne in 2001. The first event featured some 130 exhibitors and was headlined by celebrity chef Jamie Oliver. Over 38,000 visitors attended the show over the course of three days.

2002 saw the launch of the event in Sydney at Sydney Olympic Park. Due to public popularity and demand, the event was subsequently moved to the Sydney Convention & Exhibition Centre in Darling Harbour. Now due to the construction of Sydney Convention & Exhibition Centre the show has moved back to Sydney Olympic Park.

In 2005 the event was staged in Brisbane for the first time and in 2008 the inaugural Good Food & Wine Show Perth was held at the Perth Convention Exhibition Centre. The Adelaide event made its debut in 2010 at the Adelaide Event and Exhibition Centre.

Chefs that have appeared at the event include Gordon Ramsay, Ainsley Harriott, Gary Mehigan, George Calombaris, Manu Feildel, Ian Parmenter, Elizabeth Chong, Gabriel Gaté, Jill Dupliex, Rick Stein, Kylie Kwong, Bill Granger, Luke Mangan, Matt Moran, Ben O'Donoghue, Tyler Florence, Pete Evans, Tobie Puttock, Donna Hay and Gino D’Acampo.

In 2014, the Good Food & Wine Show hosted celebrity chefs Adriano Zumbo, Jacques Reymond, Matt Moran, George Calombaris, Antonio Carluccio, Alistair McLeod, Matt Golinski, Matt Stone, Miguel Maestre and Maggie Beer.

== See also ==
- Australian wine
