= Plate of Origin =

- Genre: Cooking
- Judges: Gary Mehigan; Manu Feildel; Matt Preston
- Country of origin: Australia
- Original language: English
- No. of series: 1
- No. of episodes: 10

Production
- Running time: 90 minutes
- Production company: Seven Productions

Original release
- Network: Seven Network
- Release: 30 August – 22 September 2020

Plate of Origin was an Australian competitive cooking game show that was broadcast on the Seven Network. Celebrity chef Manu Feildel hosted the series alongside former MasterChef Australia judges chef Gary Mehigan and food critic Matt Preston. The series is described as "The World Cup of Cooking" or "Country of Origin on a Plate"', with teams competing by cooking international food cuisines.

The series was originally conceived and marketed as a spin-off edition of successful cooking game show My Kitchen Rules but was later developed as a separate program. It was originally scheduled to air following the 2020 Summer Olympics, but was slightly delayed due to the postponement of the Olympic Games because of the COVID-19 pandemic. The pandemic also impacted production, resulting in a lower than expected number of episodes being completed.

The series aired over four weeks, which began on Sunday, 30 August 2020 at 7:00pm. The series finale aired on Tuesday, 22 September 2020. Despite elevated expectations and the high profile of the judges, the series was a ratings disappointment. Seven did not renew the show for a second series.

== Teams ==
List of the ten competing teams.

Team		Ages	Home	Relationship	Result
Greece	Dezi Madafferi & Penny Kerasiotis	42 & 33	Melbourne, Victoria	Cousins	Winners 22 September (Grand Final)
Vietnam	Thanh Truong & Duncan	32 & 29	Melbourne, Victoria	Friends	Runners-up 22 September (Grand Final)
Cameroon	Kelly & Ashley Vola	26 & 28	Melbourne, Victoria	Sisters	Eliminated 22 September (Semi-final)
Italy	Teresa & Michele Minichiello	60 & 35	Sydney, New South Wales	Mum & Daughter	Eliminated 22 September (Semi-final)
France	Austine Dall & Leo Garnier	28 & 32	Sydney, New South Wales	Entrepreneurs	Eliminated 15 September (QF: Round 2)
China	Mandy Chai & Chrys Hong †	28 & 30	Sydney, New South Wales	Friends	Eliminated 15 September (QF: Round 2)
India	Ash & Simran Gulati	41 & 39	Sydney, New South Wales	Married	Eliminated 14 September (QF: Round 1)
Lebanon	Jamal Gerges & Rachida Qutami	48 & 30	Sydney, New South Wales	Mum & Daughter	Eliminated 14 September (QF: Round 1)
Australia	Ethan & Stew	Both 28	Sydney, New South Wales	Friends	Eliminated 8 September (EC: Round 2)
Venezuela	Kiki Carrillo & Aly Utrera	37 & 38		Friends	Eliminated 8 September (EC: Round 1)

== Elimination history ==
Round:		Head-to-Head					Elimination Challenge	Quarter-finals				Finals	
Round:		1	2	3	4	5	Elimination Challenge	1	2	3	4	SF	GF
Teams:		Progress											
Greece	Dezi & Penny	N/A	Won (49)	N/A			Safe	—N/a	Won (30)	→		GF; Safe	Winners (76)
Vietnam	Thanh & Duncan	N/A		Lose (42)	N/A		EC; Safe	Won (26)	→			GF; Safe	Runners-up (72)
Italy	Teresa & Michele	N/A				Won (52)	Safe	—N/a			Won (26)	SF; Lose	Eliminated (Episode 9)
Cameroon	Kelly & Ashley	N/A		Won (48)	N/A		Safe	—N/a		Won (23)	→	SF; Lose	Eliminated (Episode 9)
France	Austine & Leo	N/A	Lose (40)	N/A			EC; Safe	—N/a			Lose (25)	Eliminated (Episode 8)	
China	Mandy & Chrys	Won (45)	N/A				Safe	—N/a		Lose (22)	Eliminated (Episode 8)		
India	Ash & Simran	N/A			Lose (45)	N/A	EC; Safe	—N/a	Lose (24)	Eliminated (Episode 7)			
Lebanon	Jamal & Rachida	N/A			Won (55)	N/A	Safe	Lose (19)	Eliminated (Episode 7)				
Australia	Ethan & Stew	Lose (44)	N/A				EC; Lose	Eliminated (Episode 6)					
Venezuela	Kiki & Aly	N/A				Lose (50)	EC; Lose	Eliminated (Episode 6)					

Cell Descriptions
	Team won the head-to-head and proceeds to the next round
	Team lost the head-to-head and proceeds to an elimination challenge
Safe	Team was safe from elimination after passing a challenge/round.
EC	Team competed in an Elimination Challenge and became safe from elimination.
EC	Team was eliminated after losing in an Elimination Challenge.

== Competition details ==
=== Head-to-Head ===
During this round, two teams will compete head-to-head with each team both delivering a two-course dinner for the judges consisting of a main and dessert, they are then scored on both dishes by each three judges with the lower scoring team sent to an elimination challenge.

==== Australia vs China ====
- Episode 1
- Airdate — 30 August

Results
Australia vs China
Team		Matt's Scores		Manu's Scores		Gary's Scores		Total (out of 60)	Result
Team		Main	Dessert	Main	Dessert	Main	Dessert	Total (out of 60)	Result
Australia	Ethan & Stew	9	6	9	6	8	6	44	Through to elimination challenge
Dishes	Main	Meat and Three Vegetables							Through to elimination challenge
Dishes	Dessert	Vanilla Custard Slice							Through to elimination challenge
China	Mandy & Chrys	10	5	10	5	10	5	45	Safe
Dishes	Main	Braised Duck with Biang Biang Noodles							Safe
Dishes	Dessert	Black Sesame Mousse with Tofu Ice Cream							Safe

==== Greece vs France ====
- Episode 2
- Airdate — 31 August

Results
Greece vs France
Team		Matt's Scores		Manu's Scores		Gary's Scores		Total (out of 60)	Result
Team		Main	Dessert	Main	Dessert	Main	Dessert	Total (out of 60)	Result
Greece	Dezi & Penny	9	8	8	7	9	8	49	Safe
Dishes	Main	Octopus with Skordalia and Greek Elixir							Safe
Dishes	Dessert	Loukoumades							Safe
France	Austine & Leo	7	6	8	6	7	6	40	Through to elimination challenge
Dishes	Main	Magret de Canard aux Mûres (Duck with Blackberry Sauce)							Through to elimination challenge
Dishes	Dessert	Framboisier (Raspberry Cake)							Through to elimination challenge

==== Cameroon vs Vietnam ====
- Episode 3
- Airdate — 1 September

Results
Cameroon vs Vietnam
Team		Matt's Scores		Manu's Scores		Gary's Scores		Total (out of 60)	Result
Team		Main	Dessert	Main	Dessert	Main	Dessert	Total (out of 60)	Result
Cameroon	Kelly & Ashley	9	7	10	6	9	7	48	Safe
Dishes	Main	Chicken with Jollof Rice and Plantain							Safe
Dishes	Dessert	Beignet with Burnt White Chocolate Ice Cream							Safe
Vietnam	Thanh & Duncan	9	5	9	4	9	6	42	Through to elimination challenge
Dishes	Main	Bún bò Huế (Spicy Beef Noodle Soup)							Through to elimination challenge
Dishes	Dessert	Coconut Corn Sago							Through to elimination challenge

==== India vs Lebanon ====
- Episode 4
- Airdate — 6 September

Results
India vs Lebanon
Team		Matt's Scores		Manu's Scores		Gary's Scores		Total (out of 60)	Result
Team		Main	Dessert	Main	Dessert	Main	Dessert	Total (out of 60)	Result
India	Ash & Simran	8	7	8	7	8	7	45	Through to elimination challenge
Dishes	Main	Murg Makhani (Butter Chicken)							Through to elimination challenge
Dishes	Dessert	Halwa with Pistachio Ice Cream							Through to elimination challenge
Lebanon	Jamal & Rachida	9	9	10	9	9	9	55	Safe
Dishes	Main	Samke Harra (Barramundi with Tahini Sauce)							Safe
Dishes	Dessert	Znood El Sit (Filo Pastry with Lebanese Cream)							Safe

==== Italy vs Venezuela ====
- Episode 5
- Airdate — 7 September

Results
Italy vs Venezuela
Team		Matt's Scores		Manu's Scores		Gary's Scores		Total (out of 60)	Result
Team		Main	Dessert	Main	Dessert	Main	Dessert	Total (out of 60)	Result
Italy	Teresa & Michele	10	8	10	7	10	7	52	Safe
Dishes	Main	Squid Ink Pasta with Prawns							Safe
Dishes	Dessert	Mother of Cannoli							Safe
Venezuela	Kiki & Aly	9	8	9	8	8	8	50	Through to elimination challenge
Dishes	Main	Hallaca Con Chicarron (Tamales with Fried Pork)							Through to elimination challenge
Dishes	Dessert	Quesillo (Venezuelan Flan)							Through to elimination challenge

=== Elimination Challenge ===
The five losing teams from the head-to-head rounds will face off in the elimination challenge where they will be tasked to create an Australian classic, the Meat pie, using the flavours of their nation. The team with the worst dish is eliminated. Two teams who each had the secondary worst dishes are both sent to a second round where they must each create a tart, the team with the worst dish from this round is also eliminated.

- Episode 6
- Airdate — 8 September

Challenge Summary
Team		Dish	Result
Round 1: Pie
Vietnam	Thanh & Duncan	Beef Pho Pie	Safe
India	Ash & Simran	Samosa Pie	Safe
France	Austine & Leo	Chicken & Champignon Pie	Sent to Round 2
Australia	Ethan & Stew	Beer & Vegemite Pie	Sent to Round 2
Venezuela	Kiki & Aly	Chicken Polvorosa Pie	Eliminated
Round 2: Tart
France	Austine & Leo	Lemon Tart	Safe
Australia	Ethan & Stew	Cherry Ripe Tart	Eliminated

=== Quarter-finals ===
==== Round 1 ====
- Episode 7
- Airdate — 14 September
- Description - The first four of eight remaining teams enter the quarter-finals Fast and Furious round. Two teams go head-to-head to cook a chicken dish that celebrates a true taste of their cuisine in just 45 minutes. At the end of each round, two teams will be eliminated and two teams will go to the Semi-finals.

Results
Team		Matt's Scores	Manu's Scores	Gary's Scores	Total (out of 30)	Result
Team		Dish	Dish	Dish	Total (out of 30)	Result
Vietnam vs Lebanon
Vietnam	Thanh & Duncan	9	8	9	26	Through to Semi-finals
Dish		Lemongrass Chicken Wraps				Through to Semi-finals
Lebanon	Jamal & Rachida	6	7	6	19	Eliminated
Dish		Chicken Schwarma				Eliminated
Greece vs India
Greece	Dezi & Penny	10	10	10	30	Through to Semi-finals
Dish		Chicken Souvlaki				Through to Semi-finals
India	Ash & Simran	8	8	8	24	Eliminated
Dish		Chicken Biryani				Eliminated

==== Round 2 ====
- Episode 8
- Airdate — 15 September
- Description - The remaining four of eight teams enter the quarter-finals Fast and Furious round. Two teams go head-to-head to cook a beef dish that celebrates a true taste of their cuisine in just 45 minutes. At the end of each round, two teams will be eliminated and two teams will go to the Grand Final

Results
Team		Matt's Scores	Manu's Scores	Gary's Scores	Total (out of 30)	Result
Team		Dish	Dish	Dish	Total (out of 30)	Result
Cameroon vs China
Cameroon	Kelly & Ashley	7	8	8	23	Through to Semi-finals
Dish		Soya Beef with Plantain				Through to Semi-finals
China	Mandy & Chrys	8	7	7	22	Eliminated
Dish		BBQ Beef Chuan Chuan				Eliminated
Italy vs France
Italy	Teresa & Michelle	9	8	9	26	Through to Semi-finals
Dish		Bistecca with Roast Potatoes				Through to Semi-finals
France	Austine & Leo	8	9	8	25	Eliminated
Dish		Steak Tartare				Eliminated

=== Finals ===
==== Semi-finals ====
- Episode 9
- Airdate — 22 September
- Description - The four remaining teams face off in the semi-final over two rounds. The first round all teams will be tasked to create an classic dish using the flavours of their nation. The team with the best dish will be fast tracked to the Grand Final while the team with the worst dish is eliminated. In the second round, the remaining two teams must each create a dessert, the team with the best dish will go through to the Grand Final also the team with the worst dish is eliminated.

Challenge Summary
Team		Dish	Result
Round 1: Classic Dish
Vietnam	Thanh & Duncan	Combination Broken Rice	Through to Grand Final
Greece	Dezi & Penny	Yemista (Stuffed Vegetables)	Sent to Round 2
Italy	Teresa & Michele	Pappardelle with Lamb Shank Ragu	Sent to Round 2
Cameroon	Kelly & Ashley	Ndole with Goat and Prawn (Cameroonian Stew)	Eliminated
Round 2: Dessert
Greece	Dezi & Penny	Ekmek (Shredded Filo with Custard Cream)	Through to Grand Final
Italy	Teresa & Michele	Tiramisu	Eliminated

==== Grand Final ====
- Episode 10
- Airdate — 22 September
- Description - After two teams are eliminated in the semi-final, the succeeding two teams must cook an epic three courses – entrée, main and dessert – each to be judged and scored with the highest scoring team crowned the Plate of Origin champions and receive $100,000.

Results
Grand Final
Team		Matt's Scores			Manu's Scores			Gary's Scores			Total (out of 90)	Result
Team		Entrée	Main	Dessert	Entrée	Main	Dessert	Entrée	Main	Dessert	Total (out of 90)	Result
Greece	Dezi & Penny	10	8	8	9	8	8	9	8	8	76	Winners
Dishes												Winners
Dishes	Entrée	BBQ Prawns with Yiayia's Pita Bread										Winners
Dishes	Main	Lamb with Lemon Potatoes and Greek Salad										Winners
Dishes	Dessert	Galaktoboureko with Mastic Ice Cream										Winners
Vietnam	Thanh & Duncan	8	10	6	8	10	6	8	10	6	72	Runners-up
Dishes												Runners-up
Dishes	Entrée	Morton Bay Bug Rice Paper Rolls										Runners-up
Dishes	Main	Pork Belly with Bitter Melon										Runners-up
Dishes	Dessert	Vietnamese Coffee Tart										Runners-up

== Ratings ==
No.	Title	Air date	Timeslot	Overnight ratings		Consolidated ratings		Total viewers	Ref(s)
No.	Title	Air date	Timeslot	Viewers	Rank	Viewers	Rank	Total viewers	Ref(s)
1	Head-to-Head: Australia vs China	30 August 2020	Sunday 7:00pm	667,000	7	29,000	8	696,000	
2	Head-to-Head: Greece vs France	31 August 2020	Monday 7:30pm	510,000	17	33,000	15	543,000	
3	Head-to-Head: Vietnam vs Cameroon	1 September 2020	Tuesday 7:30pm	419,000	18	27,000	18	446,000	
4	Head-to-Head: India vs Lebanon	6 September 2020	Sunday 7:00pm	459,000	9	40,000	9	499,000	
5	Head-to-Head: Italy vs Venezuela	7 September 2020	Monday 7:30pm	393,000	19	51,000	19	444,000	
6	Elimination Challenge	8 September 2020	Tuesday 7:30pm	382,000	17	45,000	17	427,000	
7	Quarter-finals: Round 1	14 September 2020	Monday 7:30pm	342,000	—N/a	41,000	20	383,000	
8	Quarter-finals: Round 2	15 September 2020	Tuesday 7:30pm	410,000	16	31,000	16	441,000	
9 10	Semi-final Grand Final	22 September 2020	Tuesday 7:30pm Tuesday 9:00pm	349,000 335,000	16 19	47,000 41,000	17 18	396,000 376,000	

== See also ==
- My Kitchen Rules
- Family Food Fight
- MasterChef Australia
- The Hotplate
