= Mark Olive =

Aboriginal Australian chef

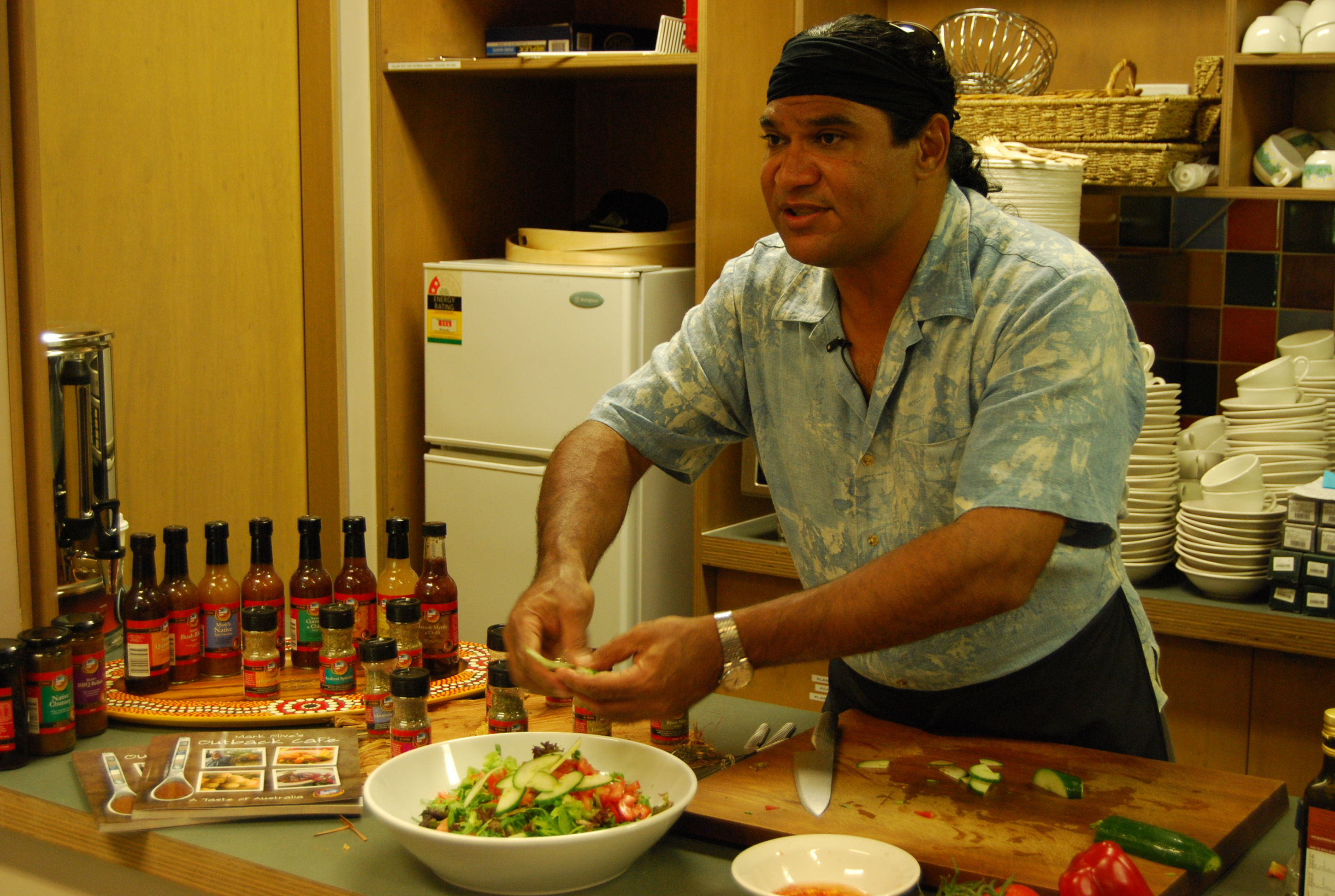
Olive cooking with bush tucker in 2008

Mark Olive (born 1962), also known as the Black Olive, is an Aboriginal Australian chef.

Olive was born in Wollongong in 1962 and is a Bundjalung man. Olive had a cooking segment on the ABC's Message Stick TV series and later got his own TV cooking series, The Outback Cafe. He has released a cookbook, The Outback Cafe, based on the series. In 2006 he won a Deadly Award for Outstanding Achievement in Entertainment. Mark Olive hosts Australian reality competitive cooking show The Chefs' Line with chef Dan Hong and food writer Melissa Leong.
