= Ready Steady Cook (Australian TV series) =

- Genre: Cooking show
- Created by: Ready Steady Cook by Endemol Shine UK
- Developed by: Southern Star
- Presented by: Nick Stratford (2005); Peter Everett (2006–2011); Colin Lane (2011–2013); Miguel Maestre (2024–present)
- Country of origin: Australia
- Original language: English
- No. of seasons: 10
- No. of episodes: 1000+ (original series); 20 (revived series)

Production
- Production location: Pyrmont, New South Wales
- Running time: 60 minutes (including commercials)
- Production companies: Endemol Southern Star (2005–2009); Southern Star Group (2009–2013); Endemol Shine Australia (2024–present)

Original release
- Network: Network Ten
- Release: 4 April 2005 – 26 August 2013
- Release: 8 March – 20 July 2024

Related
- Ready Steady Cook (UK version)

Ready Steady Cook is a four-time Logie Award-nominated Australian cookery competition show that aired on Network Ten. It is based on the original Ready Steady Cook series broadcast by the BBC. The format is owned by Endemol (now part of Banijay).

== History ==
=== Original series ===
The show debuted in 2005, where it was hosted by former chef Nick Stratford. It aired weekdays at 1:00 pm.

Former Nine Network personality Peter Everett took over the hosting job in January 2006 to coincide with Ten's new daytime lineup. From 2006, it has aired at 2:00 pm.

In March 2011, it was announced that Colin Lane would replace Everett from June 2011.

Ready Steady Cook was axed after the final new episode on 26 August 2013, after 9 seasons. Repeats continued to air until 15 November 2014.

=== Revived series ===
In October 2023, it was announced Network 10 would be reviving the series in 2024, with new host Miguel Maestre, which are intended to air on Friday nights in the new timeslot of 7:30pm. The reboot series premiered on 8 March 2024. Due to lower than expected viewership, the series moved to 6:30 pm Saturdays from 1 June 2024, then moved to 4:00 pm Saturdays from 15 June 2024.

== Overview ==
Two teams (Capsicum and Tomato), consisting each of a professional chef and an audience member compete against each other, both trying to create the best entrée, meal and dessert in a 20-minute time limit. The final segment sees both opposing chefs teaming up to prepare a dish in a strict time limit.

New challenges were introduced in 2009. As well as the regular gourmet and classic bags, the chefs are given surprise new challenges that push their cooking skills to the limit.

=== Chefs featured on the show ===
==== Original series ====
- Andy Ball
- Janelle Bloom
- George Calombaris
- Chris Cranswick-Smith
- Shane Delia
- Manu Feildel
- Matt Golinski
- Jacqui Gowan
- Damian Heads
- Mark Jensen
- Tom Kime
- Miguel Maestre (now become a host for the revived series)
- Alastair McLeod
- Nicholas Owen
- Brett Panter
- Tobie Puttock
- Adrian Richardson
- Dominique Rizzo
- Jason Roberts
- Carol Selva Rajah
- Darren Simpson
- Adam Swanson
- Anthony Telford
- Yuey Then

==== Revived series ====
- Diana Chan
- Adam D'Sylva
- Alastair McLeod (returning chef)
- Khanh Ong
- Anna Polyviou
- Sergio Perera
- Hayden Quinn
- Mike Reid
- Sarah Todd
- Mindy Woods
- Alice Zaslavsky
- Adriano Zumbo

== Celebrity guests ==
A celebrity version of Ready Steady Cook Australia aired separate to the daytime series during prime time for a brief period in 2005. The following celebrities have appeared at least once, though others have also been seen on the show, both during the regular series and prime time celebrity shows.

=== 2005 ===
In 2005, Celebrity Ready Steady Cook aired at a prime-time slot at 7.00pm Weeknights for a brief period. The show was cancelled after 2 weeks. The following celebrities have appeared on Celebrity Ready Steady Cook include:

- Natalie Bassingthwaighte
- Tim Brunero
- Anthony Callea
- Ryan 'Fitzy' Fitzgerald
- John Foreman
- Andrew G
- Mike Goldman
- Marcia Hines
- Ryan Moloney
- James Mathison
- Leah McLeod
- Kyle Sandilands

=== 2008 ===
In 2008, there were a number of 'celebrity cook-offs' on the daytime show. The celebrity cook-offs were randomly put into the schedule throughout 2008. Some of the celebrities that appeared in 2008 are:

- Faustina 'Fuzzy' Agolley (host from Video Hits)
- Christine Anu
- Natarsha Belling
- Billy Bentley (Big Brother 2007 housemate)
- Tahir Bilgic
- Aleisha Cowcher (Big Brother 2007 winner)
- John Dee (Planet Ark Founder)
- Wes Dening
- Anh Do
- Bianca Dye (first 'celebrity cook-off')
- Peter Everitt
- Bobby Flynn
- Nic Fosdike
- Adam Harvey
- Vijay Khurana
- Jade MacRae
- Brad McEwan
- Erin McNaught
- Nathan Sapsford (host from Video Hits)
- Sandra Sully
- Peter Timbs (Big Brother 2001 housemate)
- Zoran Vidinovski (Big Brother 2007 housemate)
- Kim Watkins
- Ron Wilson
- Tiffani Wood
- Bill Woods

=== 2009 ===
The celebrity cook-offs return for the 2009 series. Participants include:

- Performers Gina Riley and Craig McLachlan
- Country music stars Beccy Cole and Gina Jeffreys
- Newsreaders Ron Wilson and Kathryn Robinson
- Newsreaders Angela Bishop and Belinda Heggen
- Newsreader Brad McEwan and retired netball player Liz Ellis
- Bondi Vets Dr. Chris Brown and Dr. Lisa Chimes
- Bondi Rescue lifeguard Tom Bunting and pro-bodyboarder Alex Bunting
- Singers Grace Knight and Paulini
- So You Think You Can Dance Australia judge Bonnie Lythgoe and choreographer Jason Gilkinson
- NRL players Ben Ross and Luke Grant
- The Biggest Loser season three contestants Sam Rouen and Sean Holbrook
- Good News Week team captain Claire Hooper and Talkin' 'Bout Your Generation comedian Josh Thomas
- Radio personalities Jonathon "Jono" Coleman and Ian "Dano" Rogerson
- Socceroos players Simon Colosimo and Danny Vukovic
- Country singer, Melinda Schneider and singer/songwriter Mark Gable
- Australian Idol performers, Luke Dickens and Teale Jakubenko
- Ita Buttrose
- Father Chris Riley – Youth Off The Streets

=== 2010 ===
- Former Hi-5 member Nathan Foley

=== 2024 ===
During the special episodes of the show, there will be some celebrities from the series:

- Angela Bishop
- Laura Byrne
- Matty Johnson
- Amy Harrison, A-League Women footballer
- Amanda Keller and Brendan Jones, radio hosts
- Julia Morris & Robert Irwin, hosts of I'm a Celebrity...Get Me Out of Here!
- Jessica Rowe
- Kyah Simon, A-League Women footballer

== Episodes ==
=== Series 10 (2024) ===
No. in season	Title	Original release date	Australia viewers (National)
1	"Hayden Quinn (Capsicum) vs. Mike Reid (Tomatoes)"	8 March 2024	225,000
2	"Sarah Todd (Capsicum) vs. Sergio Perera (Tomatoes)"	15 March 2024	193,000
3	"Sarah Todd (Capsicum) vs. Adam D'Sylva (Tomatoes)"	22 March 2024	N/A
4	"Adam D'Sylva (Capsicum) vs. Adriano Zumbo (Tomatoes)"	29 March 2024	N/A
5	"Hayden Quinn (Capsicum) vs. Khanh Ong (Tomatoes)"	5 April 2024	489,000
6	"Khanh Ong (Capsicum) vs. Hayden Quinn (Tomatoes)"	12 April 2024	N/A
7	"Mike Reid (Capsicum) vs. Diana Chan (Tomatoes)"	19 April 2024	N/A
8	"Alice Zaslavsky (Capsicum) vs. Khanh Ong (Tomatoes)"	26 April 2024	N/A
9	"Diana Chan (Capsicum) vs. Adam D'Sylva (Tomatoes)"	3 May 2024	N/A
10	"Adriano Zumbo (Capsicum) vs. Anna Polyviou (Tomatoes)"	10 May 2024	N/A
11	"Alastair McLeod (Capsicum) vs. Diana Chan (Tomatoes)"	17 May 2024	N/A
12	"Alastair McLeod (Capsicum) vs. Alice Zaslavsky (Tomatoes)"	24 May 2024	N/A
13	"Adam D'Sylva (Capsicum) vs. Khanh Ong (Tomatoes)"	1 June 2024	N/A
14	"Sergio Perera (Capsicum) vs. Mike Reid (Tomatoes)"	8 June 2024	N/A
15	"Hayden Quinn (Capsicum) vs. Sarah Todd (Tomatoes)"	15 June 2024	N/A
16	"Anna Polyviou (Capsicum) vs. Adam D'Sylva (Tomatoes)"	22 June 2024	N/A
17	"Mike Reid (Capsicum) vs. Mindy Woods (Tomatoes)"	29 June 2024	N/A
18	"Alastair McLeod (Capsicum) vs. Khanh Ong (Tomatoes)"	6 July 2024	N/A
19	"Anna Polyviou (Capsicum) vs. Alice Zaslavsky (Tomatoes)"	13 July 2024	N/A
20	"Sergio Perera (Capsicum) vs. Alastair McLeod (Tomatoes)"	20 July 2024	N/A

- On 28 January 2024, OzTAM's ratings data recording system changed. Viewership data will now focus on National Total ratings instead of providing data on the 5 metro centres and overnight shares, meaning only National total ratings will be added to episodes.
- "I'm A Celebrity" special episode where Robert Irwin & Julia Morris appeared on 15 March 2024.
- Ready Steady Cook's Easter Special on 22 March 2024.
- "The Bachelor" special episode where Matty Johnson and Laura Byrne appeared on 5 April 2024.
- "A-League Women" special episode where Kyah Simon and Amy Harrison appeared on 12 April 2024.
- An entertainment royalty special where Angela Bishop and Jessica Rowe appeared on 10 May 2024.
- Jonesy & Amanda appeared on 1 June 2024.

== Awards ==
Year	Award	Category	Nominee(s)	Result	Ref.
2009	Logie Awards of 2009	Most Popular Lifestyle Program	Ready Steady Cook	Nominated	
2010	Logie Awards of 2010	Most Popular Lifestyle Program	Ready Steady Cook	Nominated	
2011	Logie Awards of 2011	Most Popular Lifestyle Program	Ready Steady Cook	Nominated	
2012	Logie Awards of 2012	Most Popular Lifestyle Program	Ready Steady Cook	Nominated	

== See also ==
- List of Australian television series
- List of cooking shows
