= Alastair McLeod =

Australian chef

- Born: Belfast, Northern Ireland, U.K.
- Mother: Candy Devine
- Culinary career
- Television show: Ready Steady Cook

Alastair McLeod is a Northern Ireland-Australian celebrity chef. He is a regular guest on Ready Steady Cook, Queensland Weekender and ABC Radio. Alastair also hosts his own food show ″Off the Eaten Track″ that has screened in Australia, Asia, and New Zealand.

Born in Belfast, Northern Ireland, he is the son of Australian singer Candy Devine. He credits his love of cooking and food to his multicultural background of Torres Strait Islander, Sri Lankan, Danish, Filipino and Spanish ancestry.

Alastair worked in several Michelin listed restaurants in Europe, including the Roscoff in Belfast (working for Paul Rankin), and Da Giovanni restaurant in Turin, Italy, as well as other venues in Scotland and France.

He is the former executive chef of Bretts Wharf Restaurant and Tank Restaurant and Bar in Brisbane.

He now owns and runs Al'FreshCo, a Brisbane catering company.
