= Cattle judging =

Cattle judging is the process of judging a series of cattle and pronouncing a first-, second- and third-place animal based on each animal's individual traits compared to that of the others. Most cattle judging occurs in show rings at agricultural shows and livestock shows.

Judgments on cattle are ultimately based on which animal is worth the most profit.

There are many fine points to cattle judging. In a beef animal, for example, it is desirable to have a large animal with muscle development.

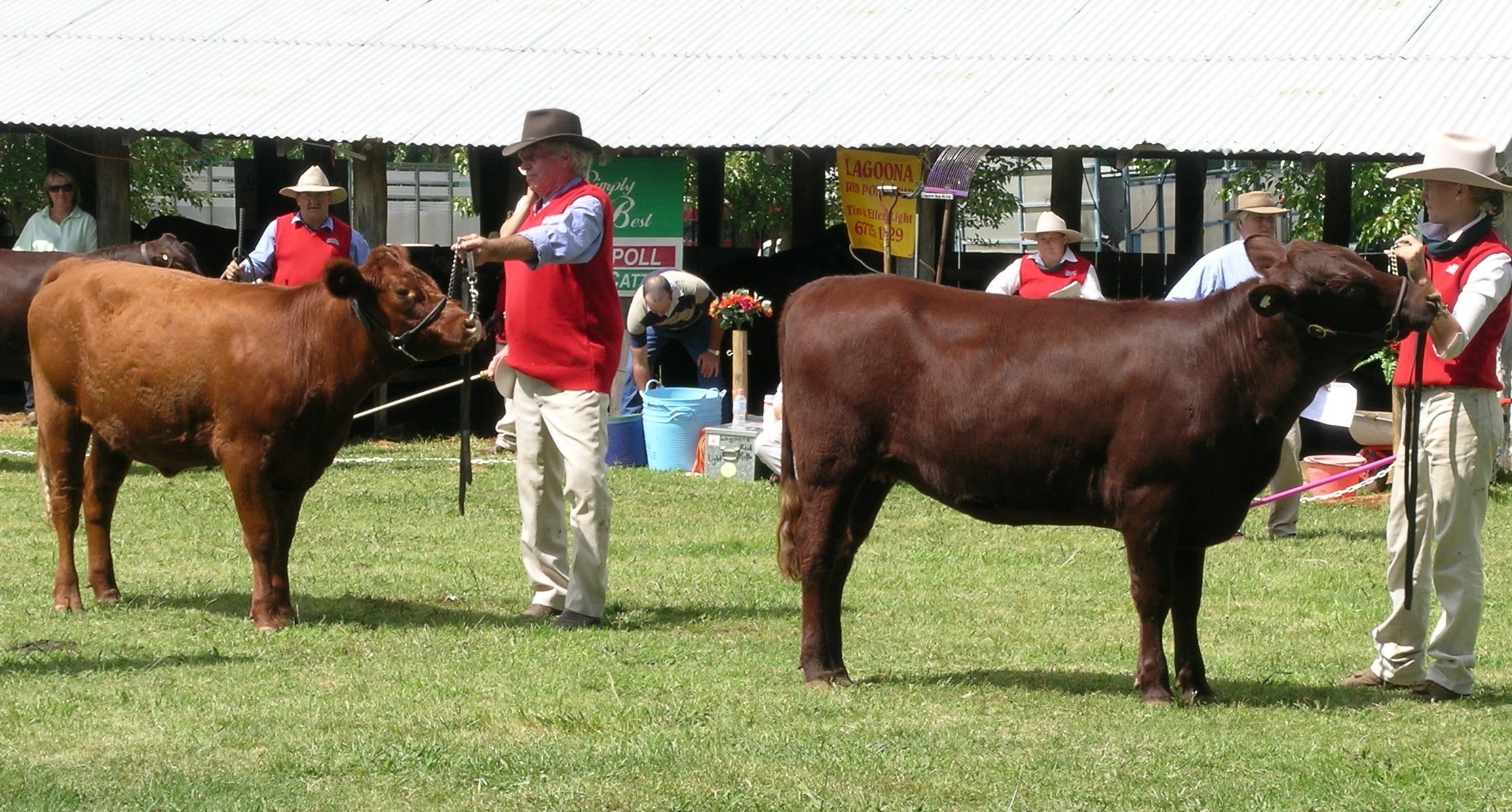
Judging Red Poll heifers

== See also ==
- Livestock show
