= Gary Mehigan =

English-Australian chef and restaurateur

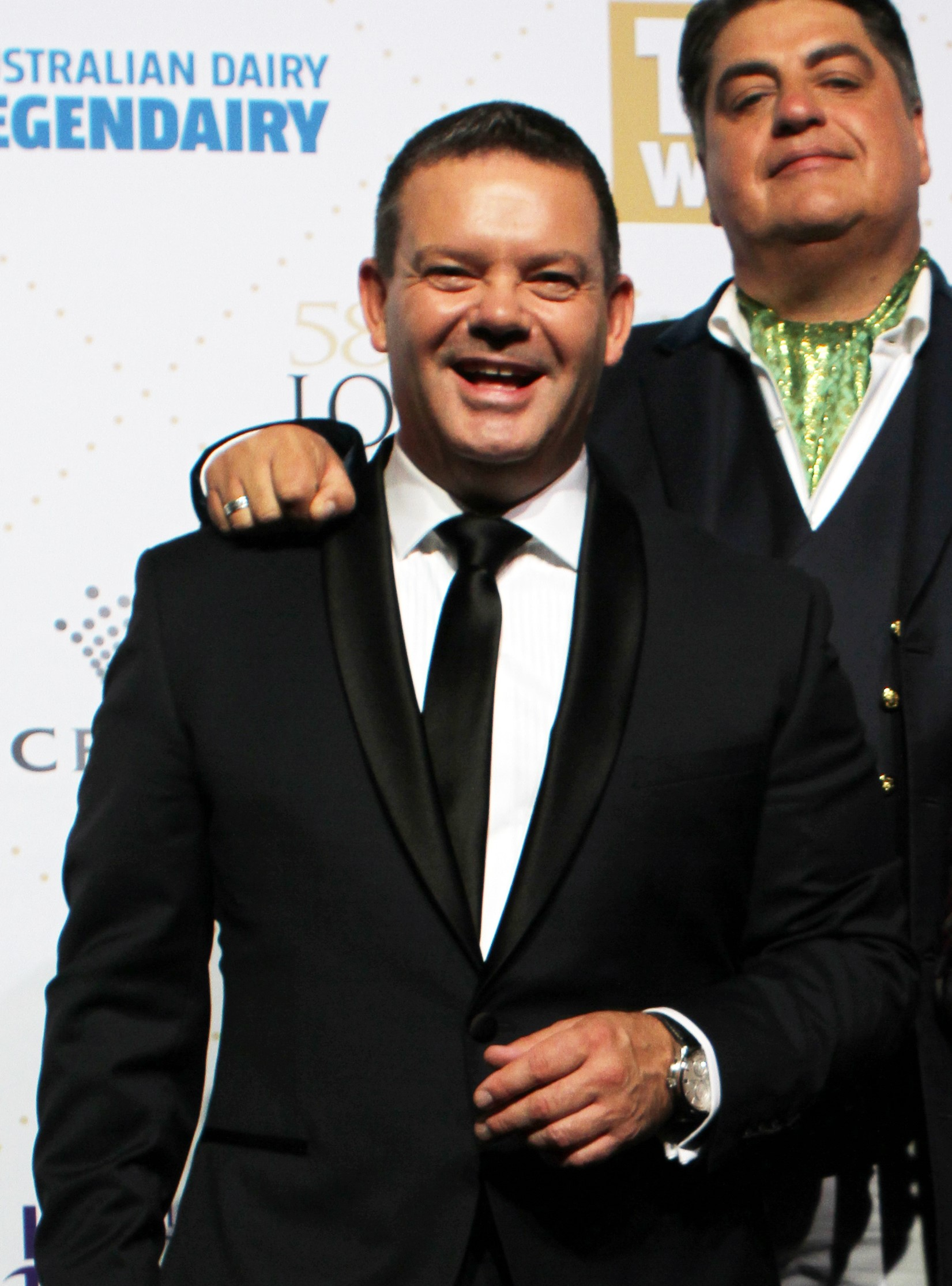
- Mehigan (left) at the Logie Awards of 2016
- Born: 12 February 1967 (age 59); Hayling Island, Hampshire, England
- Citizenship: United Kingdom; Australia
- Occupations: Chef, restaurateur
- Years active: 1991−present
- Employer: Seven Network
- Spouse: Mandy Mehigan (m. 1992)
- Children: 1

Gary Mehigan (born 12 February 1967) is an English-Australian chef and restaurateur. Mehigan was one of the original judges of the Network 10 series MasterChef Australia.

== Career ==
=== Chef ===
Mehigan trained at The Connaught and Le Souffle in London before moving to Melbourne in 1991. He has headed the kitchen in some of Melbourne's most prominent restaurants including Browns, Burnham Beeches Country House and Hotel Sofitel before opening the award-winning Fenix in 2000 and later selling it to the Leonda by the Yarra group in 2013. He formerly co-owned The Boathouse in the Melbourne suburb Moonee Ponds.

He was selected as one of the entrants to the 2012 edition of Who's Who in Australia.

=== Television career ===
Mehigan was one of the original judges on Network 10's MasterChef Australia with George Calombaris and Matt Preston. He left the show in 2019 after its 11th season. Mehigan also co-hosted two shows on Australia's LifeStyle Food channel, Good Chef Bad Chef and Boys Weekend, and appeared at the 2011 Good Food & Wine Show.

In July 2015, Mehigan began a new TV series called Far Flung with Gary Mehigan, where he travelled to various countries in Asia such as India, Vietnam, Laos, China and South Korea to learn local cooking techniques and recipes, which he uses as inspiration for a recipe he demonstrates at the end of each episode.

After leaving MasterChef Australia, on 23 October 2019 it was announced that Mehigan and fellow MasterChef Australia judge Matt Preston would join Manu Feildel in 2020 with a new show on the Seven Network called Plate of Origin. In 2022 Mehigan appeared as a guest judge on the twelfth season of My Kitchen Rules.
