= George Calombaris =

Australian chef and restaurateur

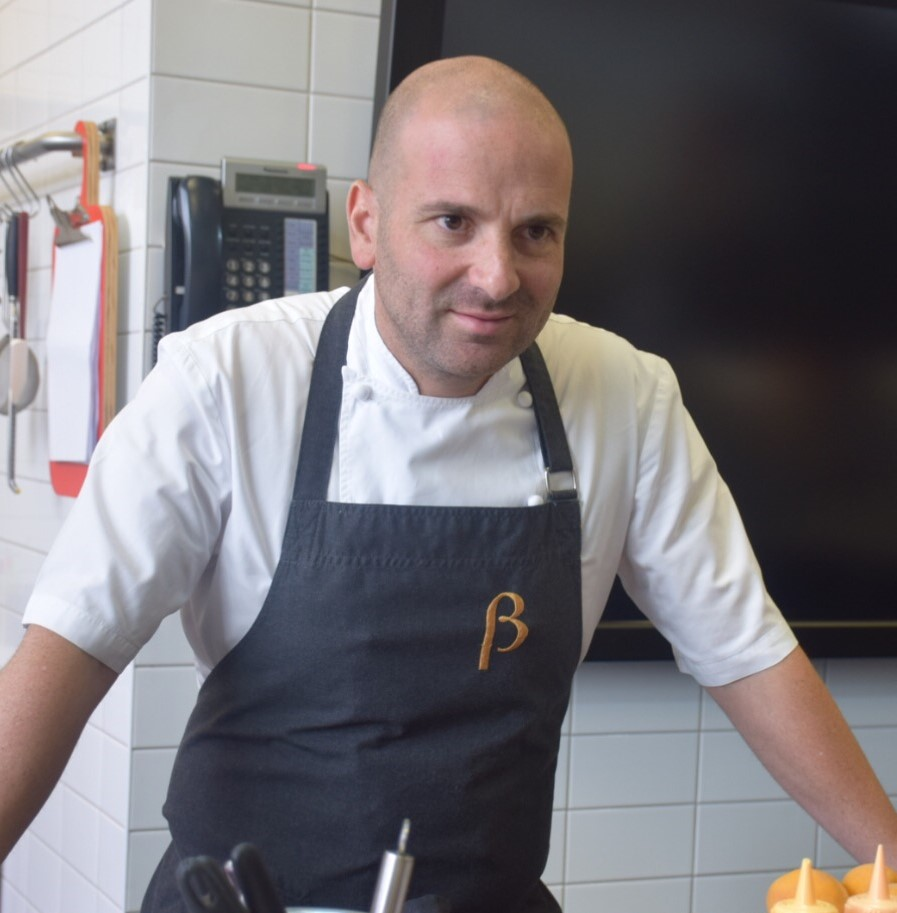
- Calombaris in 2016
- Born: George Dimitrios Calombaris; Australia
- Occupations: Chef; Restaurateur; TV personality
- Style: Greek; Italian; French; Mediterranean
- Spouse: Natalie Tricarico (m. 2018)
- Children: 2

George Dimitrios Calombaris (Greek: Γεώργιος Δημήτριος Καλομβάρης) is an Australian chef, former restaurateur and television personality. Calombaris was one of the judges of the Network 10 series MasterChef Australia from 2009 to 2019. Prior to his role on MasterChef Australia, Calombaris appeared regularly on the daytime Network Ten cooking show Ready Steady Cook.

He owned several restaurants in Melbourne. His flagship restaurant, The Press Club, was awarded The Age Good Food Guide "Best New Restaurant 2008" with Calombaris named "Chef of the Year 2008". Calombaris draws on his Greek, Cypriot and Italian heritage for inspiration.

In 2019, Calombaris's company MAdE Establishment Group admitted to underpaying A$7.83 million in wages to 515 employees, which was back-paid. MAdE agreed to pay $200,000 to the Australian Government and to undertake a number of other activities. In February 2020, MAdE went into voluntary administration, with the majority of its venues closed immediately.

== Early life and education ==
George Dimitrios Calombaris went to Mazenod College in Mulgrave, Victoria, and studied at Box Hill Institute of TAFE. He won the Bon Land scholarship in 1999 while an apprentice.

== Career ==
Calombaris has said that he draws on his Greek, Cypriot and Italian heritage for inspiration.

Aged 23, he entered the Bocuse d'Or culinary grand prix in Lyon, France, finishing in 16th position.

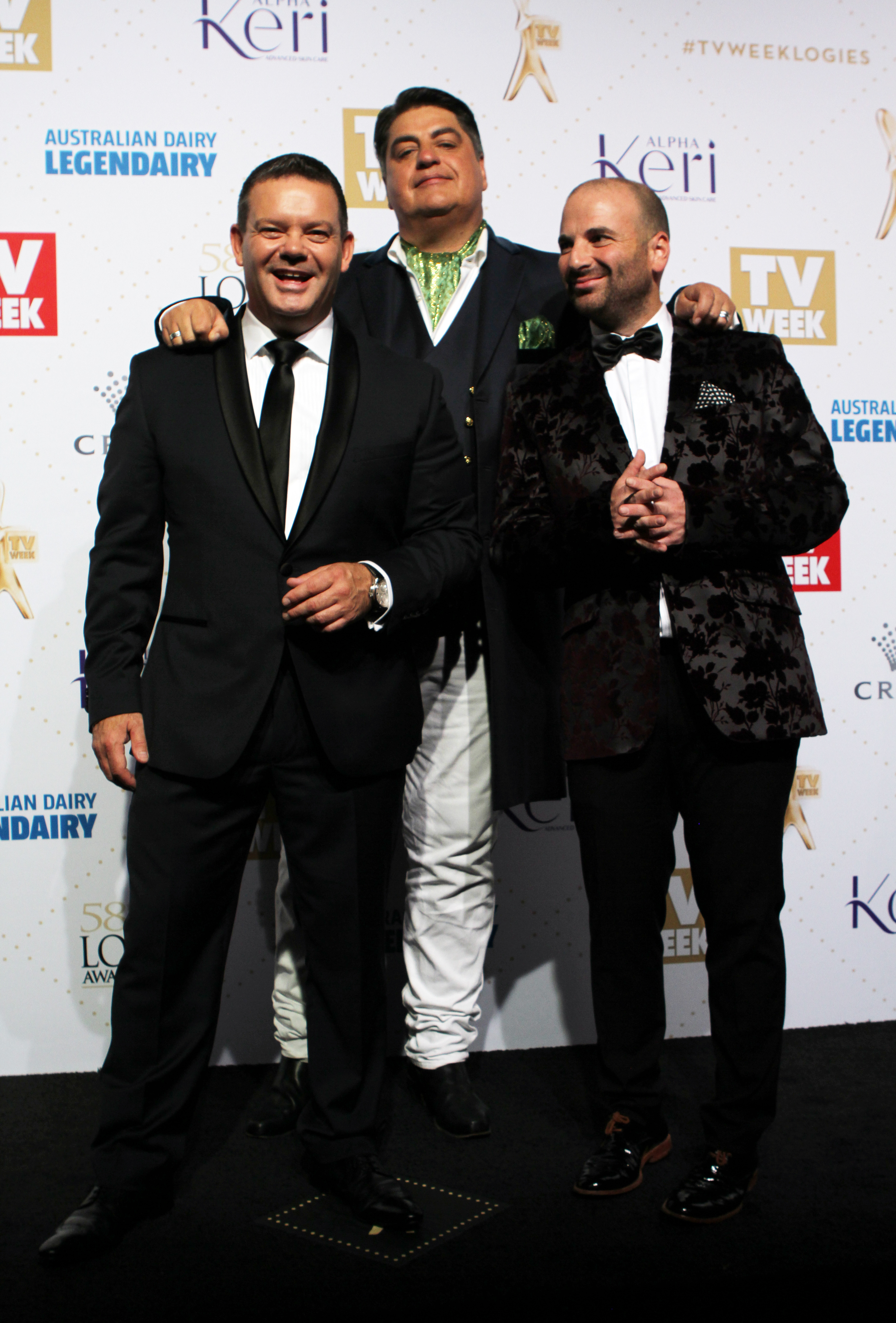
George Calombaris (right) at the Logie Awards of 2016

He spent two years working at Reserve, in Melbourne's Federation Square where, at the age of 24, he won Young Chef of the Year, Best New Restaurant and two chef's hats in The Age Good Food Guide. In 2004, the Global Food and Wine Magazine voted him as one of the Top 40 chefs of influence in the world. In 2006, Calombaris opened his own restaurant in Melbourne, The Press Club, designed by renowned restaurant architects Mills Gorman.

In 2008, he opened two other restaurants in Melbourne, Maha Bar and Grill (with chef Shane Delia) and Hellenic Republic (with chef Travis McAuley) both in collaboration with Mills Gorman. Also in 2008, he opened his first international restaurant, The Belvedere Club, in a hotel on the Greek island of Mykonos.

In January 2009, he became one of two judges on reality TV show Masterchef Australia, along with Gary Mehigan.

In December 2010, Calombaris teamed up with Mills Gorman again to open P M 24 with Philippe Mouchel.

In 2011, he opened St Katherine's in Kew, again with Shane Delia and Mills Gorman. In January 2012 he opened Mama Baba located in South Yarra, Melbourne. In July 2019, The Press Club closed, and was replaced by a new restaurant, Elektra.

Calombaris has published five cookbooks: The Press Club, Hellenic Republic: Greek Cooking from The Hellenic Heart, Your Place or Mine, Cook With Us with MasterChef Australia co-judge, Gary Mehigan.

He appears in Who's Who in Australia 2011 edition and appeared at the 2011 Good Food & Wine Show.

In January 2012, he criticised the federal government's Fair Work Act for instituting high penalty rates paid to restaurant staff, which he claimed were uneconomical for small businesses. He complained that some of his restaurants were unprofitable on a Sunday because he was required to pay staff up to $40 an hour. He is quoted to have said "The problem is that wages on public holidays and weekends greatly exceed the opportunity for profit. And it's not like they've had to go to uni for 15 years". He and his company were later revealed to have underpaid their staff by over $7 million (see Controversies).

In 2021, Calombaris was revealed to be the "Duster" in the third season of the Australian version of The Masked Singer and was the second contestant eliminated. In 2022 Calombaris returned with a new Network Ten cooking show called Hungry, hosting alongside former MasterChef Australia contestant Sarah Todd. The chef's comeback faced criticism in light of his wage underpayment scandal, and debuted to poor ratings. In 2026, Calombaris appeared on the twelfth season of I'm a Celebrity...Get Me Out of Here!.

== Personal life ==
Calombaris married Natalie Tricarico in 2018 in Greece. They have a son born in 2011 and a daughter. They live in Melbourne.

Calombaris is a Melbourne Victory supporter. He was the No.1 ticket holder for the 2012–13 season.

== Controversies ==
=== Wage underpayment scandal ===
In 2015, the Fair Work Ombudsman alerted Calombaris' MAdE Establishment Group to a problem with their payroll system, which had resulted in the mispayment of one staff member. Following this incident, the chief executive of MAdE Establishment, Troy McDonagh, commissioned an independent review into MAdE Establishment's payroll systems. In January 2017, this review discovered a number of payment discrepancies, which had resulted in further staff being underpaid, which at the time the company valued at $2.6 million.

In April 2017, following this discovery, MAdE Establishment said it had taken steps to rectify the issue, and voluntarily reimbursed the underpaid staff members at the highest overtime rate. In a personal statement, Calombaris said he was "devastated" by the situation, and that correcting the underpayment was their "highest priority".

In July 2019, the Fair Work Ombudsman entered into an Enforceable Undertaking with MAdE Establishment, in which MAdE Establishment admitted to underpaying $7.83m in wages to 515 of its current and former employees, and a further $16,371 to 9 employees of related company Jimmy Grants Pty Ltd. The Enforceable Undertaking provided for a payment to the Australian Government of $200,000 (called a "contrition payment"), in addition to training, audits, apologies and making a series of statements promoting compliance with the Fair Work Act.

Hospitality unions called for Calombaris to be sacked as a judge on MasterChef Australia. Network Ten released a statement saying "George has the support of Network 10. We will not be making any further comment."

A number of high-profile venues were rebranded after the underpayment scandal.

=== Assault ===
In May 2017, Calombaris was charged with assault after making physical contact with a 19-year-old man at Allianz Stadium during the 2017 A-League Grand Final. Video footage showed Calombaris shoving a spectator who had heckled him over underpaying his staff. Calombaris said that he was offended by the spectator "yelling out abusive and derogatory comments" about his family. The teenager denied that the heckling was directed at the chef's family.

Calombaris later apologised in a statement over his actions, saying "I regret the way in which I reacted, I am disappointed that I let it get to me, and I sincerely apologise for offending anyone." In August 2017, Calombaris's barrister entered a guilty plea on his behalf. After receiving a $1,000 fine, Calombaris appealed the conviction, and the judge dismissed the charges after deciding that Calombaris had been provoked, instead imposing a 12-month good behaviour bond.

=== Food poisoning outbreak ===
On Mother's Day 2014, Hellenic Republic was forced to close for 24 hours after about 90 patrons complained of vomiting, diarrhoea, and stomach cramps. A subsequent investigation by the Victorian Department of Health determined that a staff member was most likely responsible for an infection of norovirus.

=== MAdE in administration ===
In February 2020, KordaMentha was appointed as the administrator of MAdE, with 12 venues closed immediately and 400 staff losing their jobs after being paid all entitlements and superannuation. Only Yo-Chi, a frozen yoghurt chain, was excluded from the voluntary administration.
