= The Hundred with Andy Lee =

Australian TV series

- Also known as: The Hundred
- Genre: Game show
- Presented by: Andy Lee
- Starring: Mike Goldstein; Sophie Monk
- Country of origin: Australia
- Original language: English
- No. of series: 9
- No. of episodes: 77

Production
- Production locations: Sydney, New South Wales (series 1); Melbourne, Victoria (series 2-)
- Camera setup: Multi-camera
- Running time: approx. 44 mins (excluding commercials)
- Production company: Endemol Shine Australia

Original release
- Network: Nine Network
- Release: 10 August 2021 – present

The Hundred with Andy Lee is an Australian comedy panel television game show hosted by Andy Lee and starring Mike Goldstein and Sophie Monk. It is a production of Endemol Shine Australia for the Nine Network, airing since 2021.

== Format ==
Andy Lee poses questions to three guest panellists, who battle it out to determine who knows Australia best. "The Hundred" are 100 Australians, picked to represent the demographic make-up of Australia, who join in from around the country via Zoom and appear on a giant screen. They are polled live to give a statistical view of the nation, while the three panellists analyse the question and share their own experiences. Special guests also appear in one segment to pose their own questions.

== Production ==
The first series was filmed in Sydney for 2021 due to COVID-19 restrictions and from the second series, the show was filmed in Melbourne.

== Episodes ==
Series	Episodes	Originally released	
Series	Episodes	First released	Last released
1	8	10 August 2021	28 September 2021
2	8	8 February 2022	29 March 2022
3	8	16 August 2022	4 October 2022
4	8	7 February 2023	28 March 2023
5	7	8 August 2023	19 September 2023
6	8	6 February 2024	26 March 2024
7	7	10 September 2024	22 October 2024
8	8	2 April 2025	21 May 2025
9	12	28 April 2026	21 July 2025
Specials		23 November 2021	present

=== Series 1 (2021) ===
No. overall	No. in season	Guests	Guest Quiz Master(s)	Original release date	Australian viewers
1	1	Mike Goldstein, Sophie Monk, Sam Campbell	Anthony Field	10 August 2021	500,000
2	2	Mike Goldstein, Nikki Britton, Aaron Chen	Abbie Chatfield	17 August 2021	367,000
3	3	Mike Goldstein, Becky Lucas, Hamish Blake	N/A	24 August 2021	426,000
4	4	Mike Goldstein, Tanya Hennessy, Michael 'Wippa' Wipfli	Pat Cummins	31 August 2021	413,000 (Note: Overnight figure, consolidated figures not included in report)
5	5	Mike Goldstein, Sophie Monk, Tom Walker	Karl Stefanovic	7 September 2021	484,000
6	6	Mike Goldstein, Miranda Tapsell, Mark Humphries	Martha Kalifatidis	14 September 2021	412,000
7	7	Mike Goldstein, Jean Kittson, Dane Simpson	Kerri-Anne Kennerley	21 September 2021	505,000
8	8	Mike Goldstein, Becky Lucas, Karl Stefanovic	N/A	28 September 2021	459,000

=== Series 2 (early 2022) ===
No. overall	No. in season	Guests	Guest Quiz Master(s)	Original release date	Australian viewers
10	1	Mike Goldstein, Sophie Monk, Tommy Little	Jacqui Lambie	8 February 2022	486,000
11	2	Mike Goldstein, Becky Lucas, Tom Gleeson	Steven Bradbury	15 February 2022	361,000
12	3	Mike Goldstein, Celia Pacquola, Nazeem Hussain	Dermott Brereton	22 February 2022	406,000
13	4	Mike Goldstein, Martha Kalifatidis, Luke McGregor	Sooshi Mango	1 March 2022	445,000
14	5	Mike Goldstein, Jean Kittson, Hamish Blake	N/A	8 March 2022	461,000
15	6	Mike Goldstein, Anne Edmonds, Sam Campbell	Domenica Calarco	15 March 2022	487,000
16	7	Mike Goldstein, Abbie Chatfield, Luke McGregor	Dave Hughes	22 March 2022	484,000
17	8	Mike Goldstein, Becky Lucas and Dilruk Jayasinha	Michelle Payne	29 March 2022	513,000

=== Series 3 (late 2022) ===
No. overall	No. in season	Guests	Guest Quiz Master(s)	Original release date	Australian viewers
18	1	Mike Goldstein, Sophie Monk, Tom Gleeson	N/A	16 August 2022	404,000
19	2	Mike Goldstein, Denise Scott, Luke McGregor	N/A	23 August 2022	390,000
20	3	Mike Goldstein, Becky Lucas, Tom Cashman	Shelley Craft	30 August 2022	328,000
21	4	Mike Goldstein, Susie Youssef, Hamish Blake	N/A	6 September 2022	324,000
22	5	Mike Goldstein, Sophie Monk, Troy Kinne	Archie Thompson	13 September 2022	333,000
23	6	Mike Goldstein, Lizzy Hoo, Nazeem Hussain	N/A	20 September 2022	343,000
24	7	Mike Goldstein, Geraldine Hickey, Tommy Little	Allison Langdon	27 September 2022	379,000
25	8	Mike Goldstein, Pia Miranda, Nath Valvo	Ryan Moloney	4 October 2022	387,000

=== Series 4 (early 2023) ===
No. overall	No. in season	Guests	Guest Quiz Master(s)	Original release date	Australian viewers
26	1	Mike Goldstein, Sophie Monk, Ross Noble	Pat Cash	7 February 2023	446,000
27	2	Mike Goldstein, Sophie Monk, Tommy Little	Jesse Burford	14 February 2023	381,000
28	3	Mike Goldstein, Mel Buttle, Rhys Nicholson	Anthony Callea	21 February 2023	387,000
29	4	Tom Cashman, Sophie Monk, Dave Hughes	N/A	28 February 2023	409,000
30	5	Mike Goldstein, Anne Edmonds, Dave Thornton	Mick Fanning	7 March 2023	364,000
31	6	Hamish Blake, Sophie Monk, Tony Martin	N/A	14 March 2023	418,000
32	7	Mike Goldstein, Kate Langbroek, Nazeem Hussain	N/A	21 March 2023	417,000
33	8	Mike Goldstein, Sophie Monk, Luke McGregor	N/A	28 March 2023	441,000

=== Series 5 (late 2023) ===
No. overall	No. in season	Guests	Guest Quiz Master(s)	Original release date	Australian viewers
34	1	Mike Goldstein, Sophie Monk, Ross Noble	Jamie Durie	8 August 2023	315,000
35	2	Dave Thornton, Sophie Monk, Nazeem Hussain	N/A	15 August 2023	333,000
36	3	Mysteries episode Mike Goldstein, Sophie Monk, Tom Gleeson	N/A	22 August 2023	354,000
37	4	Mike Goldstein, Kate Langbroek, Joel Creasey	Olympia Valance	29 August 2023	324,000
38	5	Mike Goldstein, Sophie Monk, Luke McGregor	Julie Goodwin	5 September 2023	331,000
39	6	Futuristic episode Tommy Little, Sophie Monk, Lloyd Langford	N/A	12 September 2023	304,000
40	7	Mike Goldstein, Mel Buttle, Tom Cashman	Scott Cam	19 September 2023	332,000

=== Series 6 (early 2024) ===
No. overall	No. in season	Guests	Guest Quiz Master(s)	Original release date	Australian viewers (National) (Note: On 28 January 2024, OzTAM's ratings data recording system changed. Viewership data will now focus on National Reach and National Total ratings instead of providing data on the 5 metro centres and overnight shares.)
42	1	Mike Goldstein, Sophie Monk, Tom Gleeson	N/A	6 February 2024	741,000
43	2	Valentines episode Sophie Monk, Dave Hughes, Michelle Brasier	Angie Kent	13 February 2024	646,000
44	3	Mike Goldstein, Susie Youssef, Tom Cashman	N/A	20 February 2024	636,000
45	4	Pride episode Sophie Monk, Joel Creasey, Courtney Act	N/A	27 February 2024	694,000
46	5	Mike Goldstein, Kate Langbroek, Rhys Nicholson	John Aiken	5 March 2024	769,000
47	6	Mike Goldstein, Michelle Brasier, Luke McGregor	Christopher Pyne	12 March 2024	659,000
48	7	Sophie Monk, Kate Langbroek, Guy Williams	Andrew Gaze	19 March 2024	704,000
49	8	Mike Goldstein, Pia Miranda, Hamish Blake	N/A	26 March 2024	493,000

=== Series 7 (late 2024) ===
No. overall	No. in season	Guests	Guest Quiz Master(s)	Original release date	Australian viewers (National)
51	1	Mike Goldstein, Sophie Monk, Tom Gleeson	N/A	10 September 2024	535,000
52	2	Sophie Monk, Kate Langbroek, Nick Cody	N/A	17 September 2024	618,000
53	3	Medical episode Sophie Monk, Charlie Pickering, Tommy Little	Rodger Corser	24 September 2024	555,000
54	4	Sophie Monk, Wil Anderson, Michelle Brasier	N/A	1 October 2024	481,000
55	5	Animals episode Mike Goldstein, Abbie Chatfield, Dave Hughes	N/A	8 October 2024	520,000
56	6	Mike Goldstein, Sophie Monk, Rhys Nicholson	N/A	15 October 2024	528,000
57	7	Sophie Monk, Peter Helliar, Joel Creasey	N/A	22 October 2024	582,000

=== Series 8 (2025) ===
No. overall	No. in season	Guests	Guest Quiz Master(s)	Original release date	Australian viewers (National)
59	1	Mike Goldstein, Sophie Monk, Hamish Blake	N/A	2 April 2025	707,000
60	2	Mike Goldstein, Nina Oyama, Peter Helliar	Merv Hughes	9 April 2025	600,000
61	3	School episode Joel Creasey, Sophie Monk, Nick Cody	David Walliams	16 April 2025	640,000
62	4	Mike Goldstein, Kate Langbroek, Tommy Little	N/A	23 April 2025	617,000
63	5	Becky Lucas, Sophie Monk, Tom Cashman	Osher Günsberg	30 April 2025	696,000
64	6	Transport episode Sophie Monk, Kate Langbroek, Dave Hughes	N/A	7 May 2025	755,000
65	7	Ross Noble, Sophie Monk, Guy Williams	Glenn Robbins	14 May 2025	710,000
66	8	Mike Goldstein, Sophie Monk, Tom Gleeson	N/A	21 May 2025	708,000

=== Series 9 (2026) ===
No. overall	No. in season	Guests	Guest Quiz Master(s)	Original release date	Australian viewers (National)
67	1	Mike Goldstein, Sophie Monk, Lloyd Langford	Anthony Albanese	28 April 2026	739,000
68	2	Fright Night episode Mike Goldstein, Kate Langbroek, Joel Creasey	N/A	5 May 2026	664,000
69	3	Sophie Monk, Glenn Robbins, Hamish Blake	N/A	12 May 2026	614,000
70	4	Mike Goldstein, Bron Lewis, Peter Helliar	N/A	19 May 2026	620,000
71	5	Office episode Sophie Monk, Nick Cody, Nina Oyama	Janine Allis	26 May 2026	645,000
72	6	Mike Goldstein, Denise Scott, Becky Lucas	N/A	2 June 2026	675,000
73	7	Mike Goldstein, Sophie Monk, Tom Cashman	Samuel Johnson	16 June 2026	373,000
74	8	Crime episode Sophie Monk, Kate Langbroek, Dave Hughes	N/A	23 June 2026	671,000
75	9	Sophie Monk, Becky Lucas, Nick Cody	Cody Simpson	30 June 2026	665,000
76	10	Holiday episode Mike Goldstein, Denise Scott, Dave Hughes	N/A	7 July 2026	623,000
77	11	Sophie Monk, Peter Helliar, Jack Post	Max Gawn	14 July 2026	646,000
78	12	Mike Goldstein, Nina Oyama, Ross Noble	N/A	21 July 2026	641,000

=== Specials ===
No. overall	No. in season	Guests	Guest Quiz Master(s)	Timeslot	Original release date	Australian viewers
9	1	Christmas Special; Mike Goldstein, Sophie Monk, Becky Lucas	Santa Claus	8.30 pm Tuesday	23 November 2021	399,000
41	2	Christmas Special; Sophie Monk, Tommy Little, Anne Edmonds	Mrs. Claus	7.00 pm Sunday	10 December 2023	469,000
50	3	Olympics Special; Mike Goldstein, Kate Langbroek, Guy Williams	Leisel Jones	8.00 pm Tuesday	23 July 2024	568,000
58	4	Christmas Special; Mike Goldstein, Sophie Monk, Lloyd Langford	Rudolph	7.30 pm Tuesday	17 December 2024	607,000

== Greek version ==
The format is set to be adapted in Greece, with a series being produced but yet to have its premiere announced.
