= Carrie & Tommy =

Australian radio show

- Genre: Radio show
- Running time: 3 hours (3-6pm Weekdays)
- Country of origin: Australia
- Language: English
- Home station: Fox FM (Melbourne)
- Syndicates: 2Day FM (Sydney); Hit104.7 (Canberra); B105 (Brisbane); SAFM (Adelaide); Mix 94.5 (Perth); Other Hit Network stations
- Starring: Carrie Bickmore; Tommy Little
- Directed by: Kieran Simpson (Content Manager)
- Executive producer: Sacha French
- Original release: 13 February 2017 – present
- Website: Carrie & Tommy

Carrie & Tommy is an Australian radio station drive show on the Hit Network. The show is hosted by Carrie Bickmore and Tommy Little.

A daily podcast featuring the best bits from each show is available on LiSTNR as is the podcast for all Hit Network breakfast shows in Australia.

== History ==
In January 2017, Southern Cross Austereo announced that Carrie Bickmore and Tommy Little would host drive across the Hit Network with the show leading into Hamish & Andy.

Carrie Bickmore had previously been a breakfast news presenter on Hughesy & Kate on Nova 100 and Tommy Little was host of Meshel & Tommy with Meshel Laurie on Nova 100.

Between 2017 and 2022, the show was broadcast live from Network 10's Melbourne studios to allow for Bickmore's commitments with The Project. It later transitioned to the Fox FM studios in 2023.

In October 2017, Southern Cross Austereo announced the Hit Network's 2018 line up with Carrie & Tommy extending an extra 30 minutes running from 3pm until 4:30pm. Hamish & Andy ended their drive show in December 2017 and were replaced by Hughesy & Kate.

In December 2019, Southern Cross Austereo announced that the show will extend from 3pm until 5pm. Anchor Chris 'Buzz' Bezzina departed the show at the end of 2019 after relocating to Brisbane. He was replaced by Jesse Watkins.

In November 2020, Southern Cross Austereo confirmed that Carrie and Tommy would return in 2021 to host the Hit Network's national drive show from 3pm to 6pm. Hughesy and Ed previously filled the drive show, in 2021 moving to host the 2Day FM breakfast show The Morning Crew.

In November 2022, it was announced that Carrie and Tommy will continue on the Hit Network for the next four years.

In December 2022, Annabelle McNamara was announced as the next executive producer of the show, replacing Sonder Novak-Booth. Sonder previously taking the newly created role of Hit Network's Content Director of National Shows.

In October 2026, it was announced that Carrie & Tommy would depart from the Hit Network, ending a 10 year association with SCA.

== Team Members ==
=== Current team members ===
Name	Nickname	Role	Years	Notes
Carrie Bickmore	Bickers	Co-host	2017 -	
Tommy Little		Co-host	2017 -	
Jesse Watkins		Anchor	2020 -	
Kieran Simpson		Content Manager	2026 -	
Samuel McGinn		Executive Producer	2022 -	Previously a producer with Jase & Lauren
Annabelle McNamara	Belle	Senior Producer	2018 -	
Zoe Tweddell		Producer	2025 -	
Jerimiah Busniak	Jez	Creative Director	2020 -	
Elijah Pan	Eli	Digital Content Producer	2019 -	
