= Denise Scott =

Australian comedian

Denise Scott AM
- Born: Denise Margaret Scott; 24 April 1955 (age 71); Melbourne, Victoria, Australia
- Other name: Scotty
- Occupations: Comedian; actor; television presenter; radio presenter
- Partner: John Lane
- Children: 2

Denise Margaret Scott AM (born 24 April 1955) is an Australian stand-up comedian, actor, television and radio presenter.

== Career ==
Scott has appeared frequently on Australian television since her regular slot on ABC TV's The Big Gig in 1990, and a weekly segment on Tonight Live with Steve Vizard. Scott was one of the most frequent guests on musical quiz show Spicks and Specks, and appeared several times on The Glass House and Good News Week.

In 1993 she performed the live show, Women Stand Up! with Sue Ingleton and Lynda Gibson. She also co-starred with Judith Lucy and Lynda Gibson in stage spectaculars Comedy Is Not Pretty (1999) and Comedy Is Still Not Pretty (2003).

She was a member of the Vega 91.5 FM breakfast radio show; Dave and Denise with Shaun Micallef (formerly called Shaun, Beverley and Denise), until she finished up with Vega on 23 November 2007.

Scott has made appearances on Network 10 shows Can of Worms, The Circle, The Project, All Star Family Feud, Would I Lie to You?, Have You Been Paying Attention?, Hughesy, We Have a Problem, The Cheap Seats, Talkin' 'Bout Your Gen and Sam Pang Tonight. Scott starred as Trish Gross in the Australian drama series Winners & Losers on the Seven Network. She appeared as a guest on the talk show Can of Worms on Network Ten on Monday 29 August. Scott also appeared on Channel 31's To Hell in a Handbasket, with Dolly Diamond on Tuesday 17 December 2013.

Scott stars as Gwen in the Australian ABC comedy series It's a Date.

In 2017, Scott started narrating the Australian travel series Travel Guides on the Nine Network, and again teamed up with Judith Lucy for a new live show, Disappointments which commenced touring and was performed in Melbourne in April 2017 as part of the International Comedy Festival.

In April 2018, Network Ten announced Scott would join Studio 10 as a panelist.

In 2019, Scott competed in the sixteenth season of Dancing with the Stars, where she was paired up with Jeremy Garner. She was second to be eliminated from the competition.

In July 2019, Scott announced her resignation as a panelist on Studio 10.

In 2023, she starred in the reboot of the popular sitcom Mother and Son, written by Geoffrey Atherden. Scott portrayed the ageing and frail Maggie, alongside Matt Okine who played her son Arthur. The series re-imagining also introduced a multicultural aspect, with the current Arthur being from a migrant background

On 4 July 2025, Scott voiced Tortoise in Andy Lee's animated series based on his book of the same name Do Not Watch This Show.

== Filmography ==
=== Film ===
Year	Title	Role	Type
1985	Malcolm	Willy's Wife	Feature film
1988	An Ordinary Woman		Short film
1992	Vaudeville	Natural Normans	TV movie
1995	Gorgeous	Additional characters (voices)	Short film
1995	Maidenhead	Hat Shop Woman	Short film
2007	The Sounds of Aus	Self	TV movie
2013	Mother's Boy	Mother	Short film
2014	Timothy	Melinda Garrett	TV movie

=== Television ===
Year	Title	Role	Type
1989–1990	Tuesday Night Live: The Big Gig	Carmen / Babs Blewitt / Jude / Escort Agent / Doris / Wife / Magazine Reader	9 episodes
1992	Six Pack	Katherine	1 episode
1992	Let the Blood Run Free	Mrs Rottweiler	1 episode
1993–1995	Full Frontal	Various characters	26 episodes
1996	Neighbours	Coral Reeves	2 episodes
1997	Good Guys, Bad Guys	Waitress	1 episode
1997	Get a Life	Daphne Stork	
1998	Halifax f.p.	Shiri	1 episode
1998	The Genie from Down Under 2	Denise	1 episode
1999	Blue Heelers	Pam Kelly	1 episode
1999	SeaChange	Wilhelmina Seagull	1 episode
2000	Introducing Gary Perry	Woman at Zoo	1 episode
2000	One Size Fits All	Various characters	13 episodes
2001	Shock Jock	Miss Wanda	1 episode
2002	Short Cuts	Mrs Coxon	4 episodes
2009	The Librarians	Nurse	1 episode
2010	Bed of Roses	Patti Rankin	1 episode
2010	Sleuth 101	Enid	1 episode
2011	Judith Lucy's Spiritual Journey	Sister Aileen (flashback)	1 episode
2011–2016	Winners & Losers	Trish Gross	Seasons 1–5, 75 episodes
2013	To Hell in a Handbasket, with Dolly Diamond		TV series
2013	Being Brendo	Brenda Abbott	2 episodes
2013–2014	It's a Date	Gwen	2 episodes
2014	Bleak: The Web Series	Noni	Web series, 3 episodes
2015	Please Like Me	Doctor	1 episode
2015–2017	House Husbands	Nurse Toni	Season 4–5, 14 episodes
2016	Jack Irish	Sybill McLeod	2 episodes
2017	Travel Guides	Narrator	
2018	True Story with Hamish & Andy	Bernadette	1 episode
2019	Get Krackin	Margaret	1 episode
2021–2022	Fisk	Leslie	2 episodes
2023–present	Mother and Son	Maggie	8 episodes
2025	Do Not Watch This Show	Tortoise (voice)	12 episodes

=== Television (as self) ===
Year	Title	Role	Type
1990	Tonight Live with Steve Vizard	Regular guest	TV series
1996	In Melbourne Tonight	Self	TV series, 1 episode
1998	Smallest Room in the House	Self	TV series, 1 episode
2000	The Big Schmooze	Self	TV series, 1 episode
2001–04	Rove Live	Guest	TV series, 3 episodes
2004	Stand Up!	Self	TV series, 1 episode
2004	Australian Idol	Self	TV series, 1 episode
2005	Good Morning Australia	Self	TV series, 1 episode
2006	Bert's Family Feud	Team Captain	TV series, 3 episodes
2007	The Sideshow	Self	TV series, 1 episode
2005–22	Spicks and Specks	Regular panellist	TV series, 47 episodes
2009–10	Good News Week	Guest	TV series, 2 episodes
2009–10	Talkin' 'Bout Your Generation	Self	TV series, 3 episodes
2009–11	The Project	Guest	TV series, 46 episodes
2010	The Breast Darn Show in Town	Self	TV special
2011	Warehouse Comedy Festival	Self	TV series
2011–12	Can of Worms	Guest	TV series, 2 episodes
2012	The Circle	Self	TV series, 1 episode
2012	Total Agony	Self	TV series, 6 episodes
2012	Pictures of You	Self	TV series
2013	Adam Hills Tonight	Self	TV series, 1 episode
2013	This Week Live	Self	TV series
2013	Tractor Monkeys	Self	TV series, 3 episodes
2015	Judith Lucy Is All Woman	Self	TV series, 6 episodes
2015–17	Stop Laughing...This Is Serious	Self	TV series, 3 episodes
2016	Julia Zemiro's Home Delivery	Self	TV series, 1 episode
2016	The Big Music Quiz	Contestant	TV series, 2 episodes
	The Glass House	Guest	TV series
2017	All Star Family Feud	Contestant	TV series
2017	The Justine Clark Show	Self	TV series
2017–18	The Weekly with Charlie Pickering	Self	TV series, 2 episodes
2017–19	Travel Guides	Narrator	TV series, 16 episodes
2018	Midsumma VAC Hypothetical 2018	Panellist	TV special
2018	Studio 10	Co-host	TV series, 3 episodes
2018	Tomorrow Tonight	Panellist	TV series, 1 episode
2018–22	Have You Been Paying Attention?	Panellist	TV series, 19 episodes
2018–21	Hughesy, We Have a Problem	Guest	TV series, 8 episodes
2019	Dancing with the Stars	Contestant	TV series, season 16, 5 episodes – second to be eliminated
2019	Behave Yourself	Self	TV series, 1 episode
2020	Lady O'Loughlin	Self	TV series
2020	Who Do You Think You Are?	Self	TV series, 1 episode
2020	Play School	Self	TV series, 1 episode
2022	Would I Lie to You?	Guest	TV series, 1 episode
2022	The Cheap Seats	Self	TV series
2022	The Dog House Australia	Self	TV series, 1 episode
2022	The Hundred with Andy Lee	Panellist	TV series, 1 episode
2025	Guy Montgomery's Guy Mont-Spelling Bee (Australia)	Self	Season 2, episode 4

== Radio ==
Year	Title	Role	Station
2004	The Judith Lucy Show	Weekly segment	2Day FM
2005	774 ABC Evenings with Derek Guille	Host (3 weeks)	ABC Radio
2005	The Arvo with Judith Lucy and Peter Helliar	Weekly segment	2Day FM
2006–2007	Dave and Denise with Shaun Micallef (formerly Shaun, Beverley and Denise)	Co-host	Vega 91.5 FM
2013–2015	Breakfast with Meshel and Tommy	Regular guest appearances	Nova 100
2019	Hughesy & Kate	Fill in co-host	Hit Network
2019	Kennedy Molloy – National Drive	Regular guest appearances	Triple M

== Stage ==
Year	Title	Role	Venue / Company
1990	The Second Royal Commission – Ensemble Show	Comedian	Melbourne International Comedy Festival
1990	A Natural Normans Christmas	Comedian	Last Laugh, Melbourne
1990	This Is Denise Scott	Solo comedy act	Hilton Hotel, Melbourne
1992	Extraordinary Encounters of a Mundane Kind	Solo comedy act	Melbourne Fringe Festival
1993	Women Stand Up!	Comedian	
1993	Sing & Swing	Comedian	Last Laugh, Melbourne
1993–1994	Canberra Comedy Summit	Comedian	Canberra Theatre Centre
1996	Life of the Party	Solo comedy act	Melbourne International Comedy Festival
1998	Mum's the Word	Comedian	Melbourne International Comedy Festival, Her Majesty's Theatre, Adelaide
1999–2000; 2003	Comedy is Not Pretty	Comedian	Melbourne International Comedy Festival, Adelaide Fringe, Sydney Opera House
2000	Suburban Riot	Solo comedy act	Melbourne International Comedy Festival, Adelaide Fringe
2003	Comedy is Still Not Pretty	Comedian	Melbourne International Comedy Festival
2004	Scotty & Son	Comedian	Melbourne International Comedy Festival, Albury-Wodonga Comedy Festival
2005	Denise Scott Gives Good Council	Solo comedy act	Melbourne International Comedy Festival
2007	Up Front	Solo comedy act	Melbourne International Comedy Festival
2007	OVCA Lynda Gibson Memorial Comedy Event	Solo comedy act	Melbourne Athenaeum
	Regrets	Solo comedy act	Melbourne International Comedy Festival
2008–2009	Melbourne International Comedy Festival Roadshow	Solo comedy act	Australian national tour
2009	Byron Writers Festival	Comedian	Byron Bay, New South Wales
2009–2010	Number 26	Solo comedy act	Australian national tour
2011–2012	Solo comedy act		Melbourne International Comedy Festival, Edinburgh Fringe Festival, Sydney Comedy Festival, Brisbane Comedy Festival
2012	Melbourne International Comedy Festival Roadshow	Solo comedy act	Singapore, Hong Kong
2013	The Spiral	Comedian	Australian national tour
2013	Bendigo Writer's Festival	Solo comedy act	Bendigo, Victoria
2013	Laugh Your Tits Off - Love Your Sister Fundraiser	Solo comedy act	
2013	Woodford Folk Festival	Solo comedy act	Woodford, Queensland
2014–2015	Mother Bare	Solo comedy act	Australian national tour
2016	Not Just For Laughs	Comedian	Regional QLD tour
2016	Lorne Performing Arts Festival	Solo comedy act	Lorne, Victoria
2016	Queenscliff Music Festival	Solo comedy act	Queenscliff, Victoria
2016–2018	Disappointments	Comedian	Australian national tour, London Soho Theatre
2019	Byron Bay Comedy Festival	Solo comedy act	Byron Bay, New South Wales
2022	Still Here	Comedian	Australian national tour

== Writer ==
Year	Title	Role	Type
2009	All That Happened At Number 26	Author	Autobiographical novel
2012	The Tour	Author	Autobiographical novel
	The Australian Women's Weekly	Columnist	Monthly column

== Awards & honours ==
Year	Nominated work	Award	Category	Result
1999	Comedy Is Not Pretty	Melbourne International Comedy Festival	Stella Award for Best Show	Nominated
1999	Extraordinary Encounters of a Mundane Kind	Radio National Award	Best Solo Performer in the Melbourne Fringe Festival	Won
2000	Suburban Riot	Melbourne International Comedy Festival	Barry Award for Most Outstanding Show	Nominated
2003	Comedy is Still Not Pretty	Melbourne International Comedy Festival	Age Critics Award	Won
2004	Comedy is Still Not Pretty	Green Room Awards	Most Innovative Use of Form and Most Outstanding Cabaret Show	Won
2004	Scotty and Son	Melbourne International Comedy Festival	Barry Award for Most Outstanding Show	Nominated
2005	Denise Scott Gives Good Council	Melbourne International Comedy Festival	Barry Award for Most Outstanding Show	Nominated
2009	Number 26	Groggy Squirrel	Critics' Award	Won
2011	Regrets	Helpmann Awards	Best Comedy Performer	Won
2011	Regrets	Melbourne International Comedy Festival	Director's Choice Award	Won
2014	Winners & Losers	Equity Ensemble Awards	Outstanding Performance by an Ensemble in a Drama Series	Nominated
2014	Mother Bare	Melbourne International Comedy Festival	Barry Award for Most Outstanding Show	Won
2017	Disappointments with Denise Scott and Judith Lucy	Melbourne International Comedy Festival	People's Choice Award	Won
2023	Denise Scott	Member of the Order of Australia	Significant service to the arts as a comedian and actress	Honoured

== Personal life ==
Scott grew up in Greensborough, Victoria. She lives with her partner John, whom she met whilst in a clowning ensemble in Albury-Wodonga. She has two children, musician Jordie Lane and multidisciplinary artist Bonnie Lane.

Scott was diagnosed with an aggressive form of breast cancer (HER2-positive) just before embarking on the Mother and Son reboot, and underwent chemotherapy while shooting.
