= Mel Buttle =

Australian comedian

- Born: Melinda Claire Buttle; 25 January 1982 (age 44); Brisbane, Queensland
- Occupations: Comedian; television and radio presenter; writer
- Television: The Great Australian Bake Off
- Spouse: Noran Buttle (m. 2024)
- Children: 2

Melinda Claire Buttle (born 25 January 1982) is an Australian comedian, television and radio presenter and writer. She co-hosted The Great Australian Bake Off alongside Claire Hooper.

In April 2013, she was awarded the Directors Choice Award at the Melbourne International Comedy Festival for her solo show 'How Embarrassment'. She wrote on and starred in Network Ten's, This Week Live as a live correspondent. She was a regular guest on radio stations Triple J, Nova and 612 ABC Brisbane, wrote weekly for the Queensland statewide newspaper The Courier Mail and ABC television's The Drum.

== Early life ==
Buttle was raised in Samford, a semi-rural suburb north-west of Brisbane, Queensland. She completed her schooling as a boarder at St Margaret's Anglican Girls' School in Ascot, Queensland. She is one of 20 students listed as Notable Alumnae. She completed a Bachelor of Secondary Education (Drama) in 2003 at Griffith University and became a teacher at Calamvale Community College before moving to Perth in 2004 to complete a Post Graduate Diploma in Marketing at Curtin University. Buttle began stand-up comedy in Perth before returning to Queensland in 2008 and representing the state at the Raw National Comedy Finals in Melbourne.

== Career ==
=== Comedy ===
In 2010, Buttle made her debut at the Melbourne International Comedy Festival and Brisbane Comedy Festival with her show "Sista Got Flow" for which she was nominated Best Newcomer. In 2011 she returned to the festival circuit with her second show "Buttle & Buttle". She also toured extensively with Comedian Josh Thomas as a support act for his Barry Award Nominated show "Surprise". In 2012 she performed her show "Stop It, You Are!" at the Sydney Fringe Festival which won her Best Comedy. After a one-year hiatus teaching students with special needs at Everton Park State High School, Buttle returned to the Melbourne International Comedy Festival with her show "How Embarrassment" which was well received by critics and won her the Directors Choice Award. "How Embarrassment" also debuted at Brisbane Comedy Festival and was nominated for Best Local Act at Sydney Comedy Festival 2013. Other notable live performances include stand-up comedy at the Sydney Opera House, Homebake Festival, Woodford Folk Festival, Harvest Festival, Melbourne International Comedy Festival Roadshow and Up Front Gala. In late 2012, Buttle opened for well known American comedian and actor, Aziz Ansari on his "Buried Alive" tour at the Queensland Performing Arts Centre.

=== Radio ===
In 2011, she began a weekly segment on Triple J's breakfast show with Tom Ballard and Alex Dyson titled Message in a Buttle, followed by Buttle Theatre and finally Mels Strongly Worded Letters concluding at the end of 2012. In addition, she has regularly appeared on Triple J's Hack and Drive programs. Buttle is a regular guest on 612 ABC Brisbane and in 2011 she filled in on Afternoons with Richard Fidler with Katrina Davidson.

During the summer of 2010 she filled in for Meshel, Tim and Marty on Nova 106.9 Breakfast. Buttle co-hosted Nova's national Saturday Session with Dave Thornton in 2011 and filled in for Hughesy & Kate on Nova Melbourne Breakfast with Tommy Little in June 2013.

In August 2020, Buttle joined ABC Local Radio to host Weekend Afternoons.

=== Television ===
Buttle has appeared on The Circle, The Project, The Weekly with Charlie Pickering, Tractor Monkeys, This Week Live, Good News Week, Celebrity Name Game, Show Me the Movie!, Patriot Brains and Hughesy, We Have a Problem.

Buttle first appeared on Network Ten's The 7PM Project in 2010 as a Metro Whip reporter. In the same year, she covered the 2010 federal election for Network Ten's program The Circle. She has appeared in both season one and two of ABC's Tractor Monkeys as a panellist. She has also performed stand-up comedy on the Comedy Channel and ABC2's Comedy Up Late. Buttle appeared weekly as a live correspondent on Network Ten's This Week Live and often reports for the "Metro Whip" on The Project. Along with Ray Matsen, Buttle co-wrote the comedy mini series titled Fruit Unit for Network Ten, in which she also appeared.

In July 2015, Buttle and Claire Hooper were announced as the hosts of the second season of The Great Australian Bake Off, alongside new judges Matt Moran and Maggie Beer. The show began airing on LifeStyle Food in October. The series returned for a third season in October 2016, followed by a fourth season in January 2018, and then a fifth season in 2019. The show was renewed for a sixth season which aired in January 2022 after a two-year hiatus. In late 2022, it was announced that Buttle would be leaving the show as well as fellow host Claire Hooper and both judges, Maggie Beer and Matt Moran. She was replaced by New Zealand comedian Cal Wilson.

In January 2021, Buttle was announced as a contestant on the seventh season of Network 10's I'm a Celebrity...Get Me Out of Here! Australia. However, on Day 4, she withdrew from the series making her the first celebrity to leave the jungle. Later that year, she was on the panel show Patriot Brains.

In February 2024, Buttle was a contestant on the third series of Taskmaster Australia.

=== Writing ===
Since 2011, Buttle has written a weekly column for the Queensland statewide newspaper, The Courier-Mail. She is also a writer for ABC's The Drum and Triple J's "J Mag". She has also been published in "Madison" magazine. She has written for television shows such as You're Skitting Me (ABC3) and for Josh Thomas on his show Please Like Me (ABC2) and co-wrote his live show "Everything Ever".

=== Podcasts ===
Since 2011, Buttle has co-produced the podcasts The Minutes and You're Welcome with friend Patience Hodgson from indie pop rock band The Grates. Both podcasts debuted at number two on the Australian iTunes Podcasts chart.

== Personal life ==
Buttle is a member of the LGBTQ community.

She married her partner of five years at a ceremony in Queensland’s Scenic Rim region in March 2024.

Buttle and her wife, Noran have two sons. The eldest was born in 2022. Their youngest son was born in 2025.
