= Meshel & Tommy =

Former Australian radio show

- Running time: 3 hours
- Country of origin: Australia
- Language: English
- Starring: Meshel Laurie; Tommy Little; Matt Smithson; Kieran Simpson
- Produced by: Liza Altarejos
- Executive producer: Nick Daly
- Recording studio: Richmond
- Original release: 10 December 2013 – 3 December 2015
- Website: Meshel & Tommy

Meshel & Tommy was an Australian breakfast radio show on Nova 100 in Melbourne, Victoria, Australia. It was hosted by Meshel Laurie and Tommy Little.

The show began on 10 December 2013, replacing Hughesy & Kate, and finished on 3 December 2015. It aired from 6 am to 9 am on weekday mornings with music, daily topic discussions and guests.

Matt Smithson presented news, sport, weather and traffic updates.

== History ==
In October 2013, it was announced that comedian Tommy Little and drive presenter Meshel Laurie would replace Dave Hughes and Kate Langbroek on Nova 100. Meshel Laurie was replaced by Kate Ritchie on drive in January 2014 joining Tim Blackwell and Marty Sheargold.

In 2013, Tommy Little hosted Weekend Breakfast on Nova 100 and regularly filled in for Hughesy & Kate while they were on holidays throughout the year.

In October 2015, Meshel Laurie announced that she would be leaving Nova 100 at the end of year to join KIIS 101.1 and Tommy Little announced his resignation. Chrissie Swan, Sam Pang and Jonathan Brown will host breakfast with Chrissie, Sam & Browny in 2016.
