= Chrissie, Sam & Browny =

Former Australian radio show

- Genre: Comedy
- Running time: 3 hours
- Country of origin: Australia
- Language: English
- Home station: Nova 100
- Hosted by: Chrissie Swan; Sam Pang (Monday-Thursday); Jonathan Brown; Dave O'Neil (Friday)
- Starring: Dean Thomas
- Produced by: Jack Charles
- Recording studio: Richmond
- Original release: 15 January 2016 – 2 December 2022
- Website: Chrissie, Sam & Browny

Chrissie, Sam & Browny was an Australian breakfast radio show on Nova 100 in Melbourne. The show was hosted by media personality Chrissie Swan, comedian and television star Sam Pang and three time AFL premiership player Jonathan Brown. Dean Thomas was the show's anchor. News, sport, weather, and traffic updates were presented by Ash Gardner.

The programme aired from 6–9 am on weekday mornings, and included daily topic discussions and special guests, as well as playing music.

== History ==
In October 2015, Meshel Laurie announced that she would be leaving Nova 100 at the end of year to join KIIS 101.1 and Tommy Little announced his resignation.

In November 2015, Nova 100 announced that Chrissie Swan, Sam Pang and Jonathan Brown would host the breakfast timeslot the next year, with Dean Thomas, formerly host of Mornings, as anchor.

In March 2017, Chrissie, Sam & Browny was crowned the number 1 FM Breakfast show in Melbourne.

On 21 October 2022, it was announced that Chrissie, Sam and Browny would end after seven years, with the final show being on 2 December. Ben Harvey, Liam Stapleton and Belle Jackson succeeded them with Ben, Liam & Belle on 5 December 2022.

== Regular segments and guests ==
The Weekend That Was, where Sam with help from Chrissie and Browny discusses major "news, sport, drama and entertainment" from the weekend.

Final Word, where Sam names a topic and Chrissie and Browny must come up with words relating to the topic to see who has the final word.

Dead or Alive, where Browny chooses three celebrities and Chrissie must guess whether they are dead or alive.

Jokes aren't funny, at 8 am on Wednesday when callers see if they can make Sam laugh with their jokes to win $10,000 and previously a car.

May I offer you a tidbit? where callers tell Chrissie, Sam and Browny interesting facts they may not have heard of.

Deano's Pitch is on a Friday when anchor Dean Thomas (Deano) pitches new show ideas and suggestions for segments.

Sam's Diary, where Sam takes notes during the week about things that happened on the show and reads them out on a Friday.

Hanging with Deano, where Deano interviews and hangs out with celebrities, including in the past Peter Hitchener and Tim Cahill among many others.

Hit the post is a segment that sprung from Deano's Pitch where guests must try to finish what they have to read before the lyrics of a song start.

Ask Browny, where callers can ask Browny any question they want.

Chrissie's Celebrity Stuff, where Chrissie discusses the hottest celebrity news.

Cheat Sheet of the Week at the end of the show each Friday is a recap of what's happened on the show over the past week.

Other less regular segments included:

Know your Stefanovics, a segment created by Deano where guests must try to guess if it is either Karl Stefanovic or Peter Stefanovic who is talking in the sound grabs they hear.

Celebrity Chase, where Deano chooses a celebrity for each Chrissie, Sam and Browny who must then track down the celebrity and get them on the show.

Under the Bus, where grabs are played of moments from recent weeks where people have thrown others "under the bus," inspired by the 2017 Oscars where Warren Beaty handed the card to Faye Dunaway to incorrectly announce La La Land as the winner of Best Picture, knowing that there had been a mistake.

Dance Floor Fillers is when Chrissie or guests play songs that they would use to get people dancing on the dance floor.

Things we've learned from Browny/Swanny/Pangy/Deano, where humorous soundbytes are played of things the audience may have learned from the hosts during the week.

Living with the Chippie is when Chrissie shares stories about her "fella" the Chippie.

Segue Championships of the World a game in which Chrissie and Sam must attempt to segue from giving a prize to a caller to a story that's been in the news recently.

Questions you've always wanted to ask is when Chrissie, Sam, and Browny ask celebrities or sports people questions they've always wanted to ask them.

AFL or NRL, the game where Chrissie must guess whether a scandal from the past involved players from the AFL or NRL.

Surprise Interview is when Chrissie, Sam and Browny are surprised by Deano with special guests they didn't know they were going to be meeting, either in the studio or on the phone. Surprise interviewees have included Jimmy Barnes, Richie Sambora (to whom Chrissie read a Haiku poem about Richie that she had written in high school) and Gordon Ramsay.

Every Friday comedian Titus O'Reilly is on the show discussing the biggest AFL news.

Every Tuesday comedy legend Tony Martin is on at 8 am.

On Mondays during the season, Max Gawn and Jack Riewoldt alternate weeks on the show to discuss AFL.

Comedian Dave O'Neil hosts the show each Friday in place of Sam Pang.

Occasionally, producer Jack Charles, known as "Hollywood Jack", interviews celebrities and the interview is played on the show and Jack's interviewing style is analysed by Sam. Past interviewees have included Little Mix, Martin Pike and Julia Michaels.
