= Hughesy, We Have a Problem =

Australian television series

- Genre: Panel show; Comedy
- Created by: Dave Hughes
- Presented by: Dave Hughes
- Starring: Becky Lucas (2021); Nazeem Hussain (2021)
- Country of origin: Australia
- Original language: English
- No. of seasons: 5
- No. of episodes: 52

Production
- Producer: Paul Leadon
- Camera setup: Multi-camera
- Running time: 42—44 minutes
- Production company: Screentime

Original release
- Network: Network 10
- Release: 30 January 2018 – 29 March 2021

Hughesy, We Have a Problem is an Australian comedy panel television series which premiered on Network 10 on 30 January 2018. The program was hosted by Dave Hughes, who along with a panel of comedians, attempted to solve problems of viewers, guests, panellists or the host. The show was filmed at Network 10 Studios in Pyrmont, a suburb in Sydney's inner city.

== Production ==
The program was announced in October 2017, with Hughes defecting from his previous contract with the Nine Network as a co-host of The Footy Show to host the new Network Ten format, which was commissioned for 8 episodes and filmed in late 2017. The series is produced by Screentime. Due to positive social media feedback, Network Ten renewed the show for a second season, which aired from the week following the season one finale.

In May 2018, the series was renewed for a third season.

On Monday 23 December 2019, Hughesy, We Have a Problem aired its Christmas special episode.

In October 2021, Network 10 officially announced that the show had been cancelled after five seasons.

== Episodes ==
Season	Episodes	Originally aired	
Season	Episodes	First aired	Last aired
**1**	8	30 January 2018	20 March 2018
**2**	8	27 March 2018	9 May 2018
**3**	15	29 January 2019	23 December 2019
**4**	13	20 January 2020	20 April 2020
**5**	8	8 February 2021	29 March 2021

=== Season 1 (2018) ===
No. overall	No. in season	Guests	Celebrities	Timeslot	Original release date	Viewers
1	1	Harley Breen, Anne Edmonds, Nazeem Hussain, Julia Morris	Ricki-Lee Coulter	8:40 pm Tuesday	30 January 2018	660,000
2	2	Lawrence Mooney, Rachel Corbett, Nick Cody, Urzila Carlson	Brendan Jones	8:40 pm Tuesday	6 February 2018	551,000
3	3	Anne Edmonds, Merrick Watts, Kate Langbroek, Sam Simmons	Brooke Satchwell	9:00 pm Tuesday	13 February 2018	482,000
4	4	Dave Thornton, Susie Youssef, Lehmo, Fiona O'Loughlin	Matty Johnson	8:45 pm Tuesday	20 February 2018	504,000
5	5	Kate Langbroek, Joel Creasey, Denise Scott, Dave O'Neil	Ita Buttrose	8:40 pm Tuesday	27 February 2018	480,000
6	6	Meshel Laurie, Luke McGregor, Sarah Harris, Merrick Watts	Natarsha Belling	8:40 pm Tuesday	6 March 2018	479,000
7	7	Dave O'Neil, Susie Youssef, Tommy Little, Denise Scott	Michala Banas	8:40 pm Tuesday	13 March 2018	445,000
8	8	Judith Lucy, Rhys Nicholson, Jo Stanley, Peter Berner	Sam Wood	8:40 pm Tuesday	20 March 2018	363,000

=== Season 2 (2018) ===
No. overall	No. in season	Guests	Celebrities	Timeslot	Original release date	Viewers
9	1	Josh Thomas, Susie Youssef, Charlie Pickering, Meshel Laurie	Osher Günsberg	8:40pm Tuesday	27 March 2018	579,000
10	2	Dave O'Neil, Cal Wilson, Ross Noble, Chrissie Swan	Florence Moerenhout	8:50 pm Tuesday	3 April 2018	553,000
11	3	Nazeem Hussain, Sarah Harris, Sam Simmons, Fiona O'Loughlin	Alex Perry	8:40 pm Tuesday	10 April 2018	465,000
12	4	Anne Edmonds, Matt Okine, Kate Langbroek, Dave Thornton	Ian Smith	8:45 pm Tuesday	17 April 2018	495,000
13	5	Urzila Carlson, Merrick Watts, Em Rusciano, Jason Byrne	Gina Liano	8:40 pm Tuesday	24 April 2018	288,000
14	6	Becky Lucas, Lawrence Mooney, Kate Langbroek, Tommy Little	Merv Hughes	8:50 pm Tuesday	1 May 2018	422,000
15	7	Sarah Harris, Rove McManus, Meshel Laurie, Peter Rowsthorn	Casey Donovan	9:10 pm Tuesday	8 May 2018	460,000
16	8	Susie Youssef, Luke McGregor, Poh Ling Yeow, Peter Helliar	Danny Green	8:45 pm Wednesday	9 May 2018	495,000

=== Season 3 (2019) ===
No. overall	No. in season	Guests	Celebrities	Timeslot	Original release date	Viewers
17	1	Celia Pacquola, Tommy Little, Kate Langbroek, Sam Simmons	Beau Ryan	9:00 pm Tuesday	29 January 2019	521,000
18	2	Nazeem Hussain, Ellen Briggs, Tom Ballard, Anne Edmonds	Anthony Callea	9:00 pm Tuesday	5 February 2019	434,000
19	3	Ryan Fitzgerald, Claire Hooper, Luke McGregor, Meshel Laurie	Jacqui Lambie	9:00 pm Tuesday	12 February 2019	373,000
20	4	Amanda Keller, Ivan Aristeguieta, Kate Langbroek, Peter Helliar	Michelle Bridges	8:45 pm Tuesday	19 February 2019	261,000
21	5	Urzila Carlson, Luke McGregor, Nikki Osborne, Kyle Sandilands	Natalie Bassingthwaighte	9:35 pm Sunday	24 February 2019	285,000
22	6	Dave O'Neil, Denise Scott, Charlie Pickering, Em Rusciano	Jessica Rowe	9:05 pm Sunday	3 March 2019	277,000
23	7	Merrick Watts, Mel Buttle, Cal Wilson, Sam Simmons	Grant Denyer	9:05 pm Sunday	10 March 2019	232,000
24	8	Judith Lucy, Harley Breen, Yumi Stynes, Tom Gleeson	Sandra Sully	8:35 pm Sunday	17 March 2019	309,000
25	9	Fiona O'Loughlin, Dilruk Jayasinha, Sarah Harris, Dave Thornton	Gretel Killeen	9:00 pm Sunday	24 March 2019	251,000
26	10	Denise Scott, Nath Valvo, Mel Buttle, Akmal Saleh	Mark Humphries	9:00 pm Sunday	31 March 2019	233,000
27	11	Merrick Watts, Nazeem Hussain, Felicity Ward, Ross Noble	Shannon Noll	9:00 pm Sunday	7 April 2019	198,000
28	12	Susie Youssef, Arj Barker, Kate McLennan, Akmal Saleh	Dylan Alcott	9:05 pm Sunday	14 April 2019	249,000
29	13	Georgie Carroll, Joel Creasey, Anne Edmonds, Tony Martin	Olympia Valance	9:20 pm Sunday	28 April 2019	231,000
30	14	Anne Edmonds, Peter Helliar, Claire Hooper, Rove McManus	Brendan Fevola	9:10 pm Sunday	5 May 2019	311,000
31	15	Kate Langbroek, Charlie Pickering, Nikki Osborne, Ross Noble	Yvie Jones	7.30 pm Monday	23 December 2019	321,000

=== Season 4 (2020) ===
No. overall	No. in season	Guests	Celebrities	Timeslot	Original release date	Viewers
32	1	Arj Barker, Steph Tisdell, Tommy Little, Amanda Keller	Roxy Jacenko	9:00 pm Monday	20 January 2020	411,000
33	2	Harley Breen, Tanya Hennessy, Sam Simmons, Denise Scott	Cassandra Thorburn	9:00 pm Monday	27 January 2020	247,000
34	3	Judith Lucy, Shaun Micallef, Em Rusciano, Tommy Little	Jimmy Rees	9:20 pm Monday	3 February 2020	265,000
35	4	Meshel Laurie, Tom Ballard, Cal Wilson, Nazeem Hussain	Osher Günsberg	9:10 pm Monday	10 February 2020	269,000
36	5	Tom Gleeson, Mel Buttle, Steph Tisdell, Akmal Saleh	Human Nature	9:10 pm Monday	17 February 2020	279,000
37	6	Geraldine Hickey, Tommy Little, Ross Noble, Denise Scott	Pat Cash	9:10pm Monday	24 February 2020	275,000
38	7	Julia Morris, Hamish Blake, Meshel Laurie, Anne Edmonds	Jack Vidgen	9:05pm Monday	2 March 2020	335,000
39	8	Peter Helliar, Nikki Britton, Joel Creasey, Em Rusciano	Courtney Act	9:00 pm Monday	9 March 2020	351,000
40	9	Dave O'Neil, Becky Lucas, Stephen K Amos, Claire Hooper	Ben Elton, Tim Robards	9:00 pm Monday	16 March 2020	293,000
41	10	Felicity Ward, Sam Taunton, Fiona O'Loughlin, Luke McGregor	Barry Hall	8:40 pm Monday	23 March 2020	333,000
42	11	Denise Scott, Merrick Watts, Em Rusciano, Akmal Saleh	Rob Mills	8:30 pm Monday	6 April 2020	298,000
43	12	Cal Wilson, Nazeem Hussain, Sarah Harris, Ross Noble	Melissa Leong	9:20 pm Monday	13 April 2020	382,000
44	13	Kate Langbroek, Nath Valvo, Jan Fran, Dave O'Neil	Richard Reid	8:45 pm Monday	20 April 2020	332,000

=== Season 5 (2021) ===
Note: Problem Solvers Of The Week are listed in bold

No. overall	No. in season	Guests	Celebrities	Timeslot	Original release date	Viewers
45	1	Becky Lucas, Ross Noble, **Kate Langbroek**, Nazeem Hussain	Lisa Wilkinson	8:40 pm Monday	8 February 2021	264,000
46	2	Becky Lucas, **Em Rusciano**, Beau Ryan, Nazeem Hussain	Brooke Stratton	8:40 pm Monday	15 February 2021	280,000
47	3	Becky Lucas, Ryan Fitzgerald, **Anne Edmonds**, Nazeem Hussain	Dan Ewing	8:40 pm Monday	22 February 2021	219,000
48	4	Becky Lucas, Kate Langbroek, Nath Valvo, Nazeem Hussain	Murray Cook	8:40 pm Monday	1 March 2021	223,000
49	5	Becky Lucas, Josh Thomas, **Jess Eva**, Nazeem Hussain	Abbie Chatfield, Tom Papley	9:30 pm Monday	8 March 2021	354,000
50	6	Becky Lucas, Craig Reucassel, **Denise Scott**, Nazeem Hussain	Oli Leimbach	9:00 pm Monday	15 March 2021	211,000
51	7	**Becky Lucas**, Merrick Watts, Julia Morris, Nazeem Hussain	Amy Shark, Osher Günsberg	9:00 pm Monday	22 March 2021	199,000
52	8	Becky Lucas, Joel Creasey, Kate Langbroek, Nazeem Hussain	Angie Kent	8:30 pm Monday	29 March 2021	191,000
