= The Breast Darn Show in Town =

- Genre: comedy, stand-up comedy
- Created by: Claire Haugh, Darren Chau, Sarah Gerrand
- Directed by: Jon Olb (2009), Paul Drane (2010)
- Presented by: Julia Morris, Grant Denyer, Corinne Grant
- Starring: Rebel Wilson, Mick Molloy, Hannah Gadsby, Celia Pacquola, Jordan Raskopoulos, Sam Simmons, Tom Ballard, Fiona O'Loughlin, Dave Thornton, Toby Truslove, Claire Hooper, Cal Wilson, Felicity Ward, Denise Scott, Mark Mitchell
- Country of origin: Australia
- Original language: English
- No. of seasons: 2
- No. of episodes: 2

Production
- Executive producer: Darren Chau
- Producer: Claire Haugh
- Editor: Charme Lee (2010)
- Camera setup: John Balgue, Renzo Beltrame, Paul Bossio, David Mckell, Soner Tunchay, George Vernon
- Running time: 60 minutes (with commercials)
- Production companies: Foxtel, Teleplay, Entourage Marketing & Events Ltd, National Breast Cancer Foundation (Australia)

Original release
- Network: The Comedy Channel
- Release: 1 November 2009

The Breast Darn Show in Town is an Australian comedy event created and executive produced by the Comedy Channel programming director Darren Chau and Alex Ristevski Comedy Channel Manager, with Claire Haugh as producer and Sarah Gerrand of Entourage Marketing & Events handling sponsorship and front of stage management. Sponsored by Ford Australia in aid of the National Breast Cancer Foundation.

Filmed at the Melbourne Town Hall, the format features a range of television, film, and comedic performers including Rebel Wilson, Mick Molloy, Hannah Gadsby, Bev Killick, Tom Gleeson, Joel Creasey, Jeff Green, Tommy Dean, Celia Pacquola, Jordan Raskopoulos, Sam Simmons, Tom Ballard, Fiona O'Loughlin, Dave Thornton, Toby Truslove, Claire Hooper, Cal Wilson, Felicity Ward, Justin Hamilton, Denise Scott and Mark Mitchell as Con the Fruiterer. The first special was hosted by Julia Morris premiered on the Comedy Channel on 1 November 2009. The second special was hosted by Grant Denyer and Corinne Grant and premiered on the Comedy Channel on 5 November 2010.

A comeback series is planned for 2020.
