= Carrie Bickmore =

Australian journalist, radio presenter and television presenter (born 1980)

Carrie Bickmore OAM
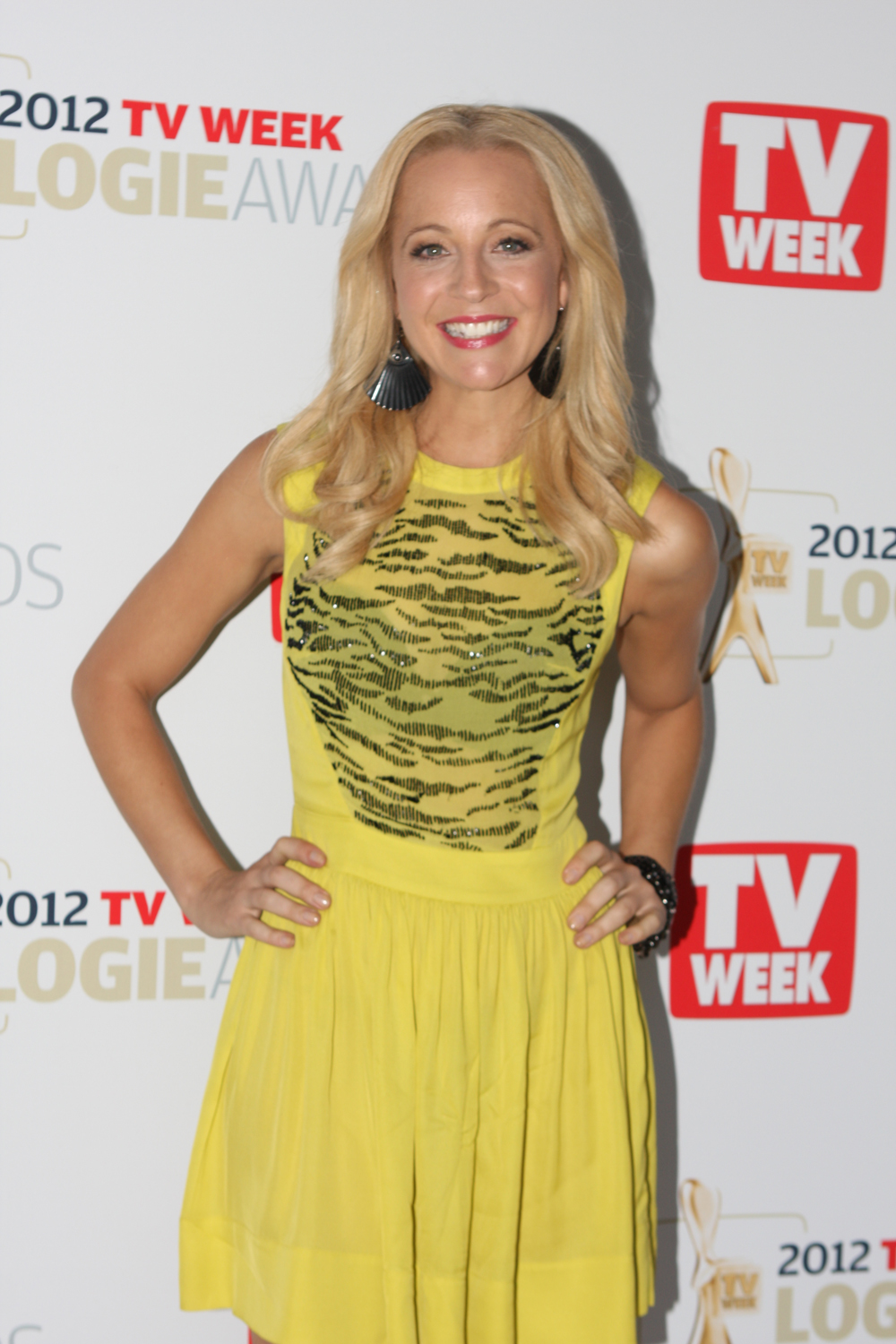
- Bickmore at the 2012 TV Week Logie Awards
- Born: 3 December 1980 (age 45); Adelaide, South Australia, Australia
- Education: Perth College, Curtin University
- Occupation: Media personality
- Years active: 2000−present
- Employer: Hit Network
- Spouse: Greg Lange (m. 2005; died 2010)
- Partner: Chris Walker (2012–2023)
- Children: 3

Carrie Bickmore (born 3 December 1980) is an Australian radio presenter, comedian, philanthropist and former television presenter. She currently co-hosts the national drive radio show on the Hit Network, Carrie & Tommy, from 3–6pm weeknights alongside Tommy Little. She was previously a co-host on Network 10's talk show The Project from 2009–2022.

== Early life and education ==
Carrie Bickmore was born on 3 December 1980 in Adelaide, South Australia, but moved to Perth, Western Australia, at an early age.

Bickmore attended the Anglican girls' school Perth College. She later studied English at Curtin University of Technology, graduating in 2000 with a Bachelor of Arts. She moved to Melbourne, Victoria, in 2001 to pursue a career in media.

== Career ==
=== Radio ===
Bickmore started her career as a newsreader on 92.9FM in Perth where she began as an emergency fill-in for a sick colleague. Her father Brian Bickmore was a radio announcer on that station at the time and later took up management positions in the Austereo network. After this she was appointed as a regular newsreader for the station.

In 2001, Bickmore became the afternoon newsreader for radio station Nova 100 in Melbourne and in 2002 she became the co-host of the drive show with Andy Ross.

Bickmore was a 2005 Best News Presenter finalist in the Australian Commercial Radio Awards. Bickmore, Rebecca Leahy and Michael Colling accepted the award for Best Community Service Project – Metro, on behalf of Nova 100.

In 2007, Bickmore was appointed the breakfast newsreader on Hughesy & Kate on Nova 100. In August 2009, she announced that she would be leaving Nova 100 to focus on The 7pm Project. Her last day was 25 September 2009.

In October 2012, Bickmore and Charlie Pickering were part of radio show The Breakfast Project, which aired nationally for three weeks. Both critics and fans were impressed with the show sparking rumours that Bickmore and Pickering were going to become regulars on Nova 100 Melbourne.

In November 2013, Bickmore returned to Nova 100 to read the news one last time and to say farewell to long-standing breakfast radio duo Hughesy and Kate.

In January 2017, Southern Cross Austereo announced that Bickmore and Tommy Little would host Carrie & Tommy across the Hit Network from 3pm.

=== Television ===
In 2006, Bickmore made her start in television on the variety show Rove Live, presenting the "Carrie @ the News Desk" segment for each episode. Often the news stories related to actual events, but ended in a twist with the punchline. A running joke throughout the segment was Bickmore's quirky introductions in which she added a quip, often playing off social trends, music and popular culture, for example: "Good evening. I'm Carrie Bickmore and don't you wish your girlfriend was hot like me?" In 2007, Bickmore returned to the show with a more important role.

In 2009, Bickmore was announced as one of the hosts for Network 10's new news and current affairs program The 7pm Project, (later The Project) alongside comedians Dave Hughes and Charlie Pickering. The program airs weeknights on Network Ten and further expanded her profile as a television presenter.

On 2 May 2010, Bickmore won the 2010 Logie Award for Best New Female Talent for her work on Rove and The Project.

In December 2010, Bickmore was criticised by The Drum's editor, Jonathan Green, and representatives of the Australian coffee industry, for promoting McDonald's in a report for The Oprah Winfrey Show, which McDonald's confirmed was paid advertising.

After several months away from The 7PM Project in 2011, Bickmore returned to television after the death of her husband.

Bickmore was nominated for the Gold Logie for Most Popular TV Personality in 2012 and 2013. In 2014, Bickmore was again nominated for the award, resulting in the media nicknaming her 'the golden girl' of Network Ten alongside Asher Keddie.

In 2013, it was announced that Bickmore would front a revamped version of So You Think You Can Dance Australia for Network Ten alongside former American Idol judge Paula Abdul.

In 2015, Bickmore won the Gold Logie award. During her acceptance speech she donned a beanie in order to raise awareness for her late husband's struggle with brain cancer, and encouraged her peers to wear a beanie in order to support the cause; using her husband's fears about his scars and use of beanies to cover them as the story behind the symbol. In November 2015, she subsequently launched Carrie's Beanies 4 Brain Cancer with the aim of initially raising $4,200,000 for brain cancer research, a feat that was subsequently achieved two months later in January 2016.

As of September 2022, Carrie's Beanies 4 Brain Cancer is stated to have raised over $18 million so far.

Bickmore announced in October 2022 that she was going to leave The Project the following month to spend more time with her family. Her last show was on 30 November 2022. She was the longest serving panellist after her former colleagues: Dave Hughes who left in December 2013 to focus on his stand-up comedy and radio and Charlie Pickering who left in March 2014 to host The Weekly with Charlie Pickering.

=== Other ===
In 2010, Bickmore was the official host and ambassador for the L'Oreal Melbourne Fashion Festival held in Melbourne.

In April 2012, Bickmore was named as the official Cadbury Easter Ambassador, and helped launch Cadbury's Easter campaign at an event in Melbourne to media and key stakeholders, and promoted charity donations for Foodbank Australia.

In November 2012, it was announced Bickmore would become a UNICEF Ambassador for Project Eliminate, raising "awareness of neonatal and maternal tetanus".

In November 2014, Bickmore announced that she had become the ongoing face of the global French beauty brand Garnier in Australia and subsequently featured in several beauty advertising campaigns for Garnier Nutrisse hair colour and Garnier BB cream.

== Personal life ==
In 2005, she married Greg Lange, who also worked in the media industry. She gave birth to their son in 2007. Lange died after a decade-long battle with brain cancer on 27 December 2010.

With her partner Chris Walker, Bickmore had two daughters, the first born in March 2015 and the second in December 2018. Bickmore and Walker separated in 2023.

== Accolades ==
In 2017, Bickmore was inducted onto the Victorian Honour Roll of Women in recognition of her work as a "charitable and inspirational role model for women and girls". She was awarded the Medal of the Order of Australia in the 2019 Queen's Birthday Honours for service to the broadcast media, and to brain cancer awareness. In November 2025, Bickmore was awarded the Victorian Australian of the Year Award, making her eligible for the 2026 Australian of the Year award.

Awards for television include:

| Award | Date | Category | Outcome | Work | Ref |
|---|---|---|---|---|---|
| 52nd Logie Awards | 2 May 2010 | Most Popular New Female Talent | Won | The 7PM Project | |
| 54th Logie Awards | 15 April 2012 | Most Popular Presenter | Nominated | The Project | |
| 54th Logie Awards | 15 April 2012 | Gold Logie Award for Most Popular Personality on Australian Television | Nominated | The Project | |
| 55th Logie Awards | 7 April 2013 | Most Popular Presenter | Nominated | The Project | |
| 55th Logie Awards | 7 April 2013 | Gold Logie Award for Most Popular Personality on Australian Television | Nominated | The Project | |
| 56th Logie Awards | 20 April 2014 | Most Popular Presenter | Nominated | The Project | |
| 56th Logie Awards | 20 April 2014 | Gold Logie Award for Most Popular Personality on Australian Television | Nominated | The Project | |
| 57th Logie Awards | 3 May 2015 | Most Popular Presenter | Won | The Project | |
| 57th Logie Awards | 3 May 2015 | Gold Logie Award for Most Popular Personality on Australian Television | Won | The Project | |
| 58th Logie Awards | 8 May 2016 | Most Popular Presenter | Nominated | The Project | |
| 58th Logie Awards | 8 May 2016 | Gold Logie Award for Most Popular Personality on Australian Television | Nominated | The Project | |

Media offices
| Preceded by Originator | The Project; Co-host; 20 July 2009 – 30 November 2022 | Succeeded by Sarah Harris |
