= Tom Cashman (comedian) =

Australian comedian (born 1989)

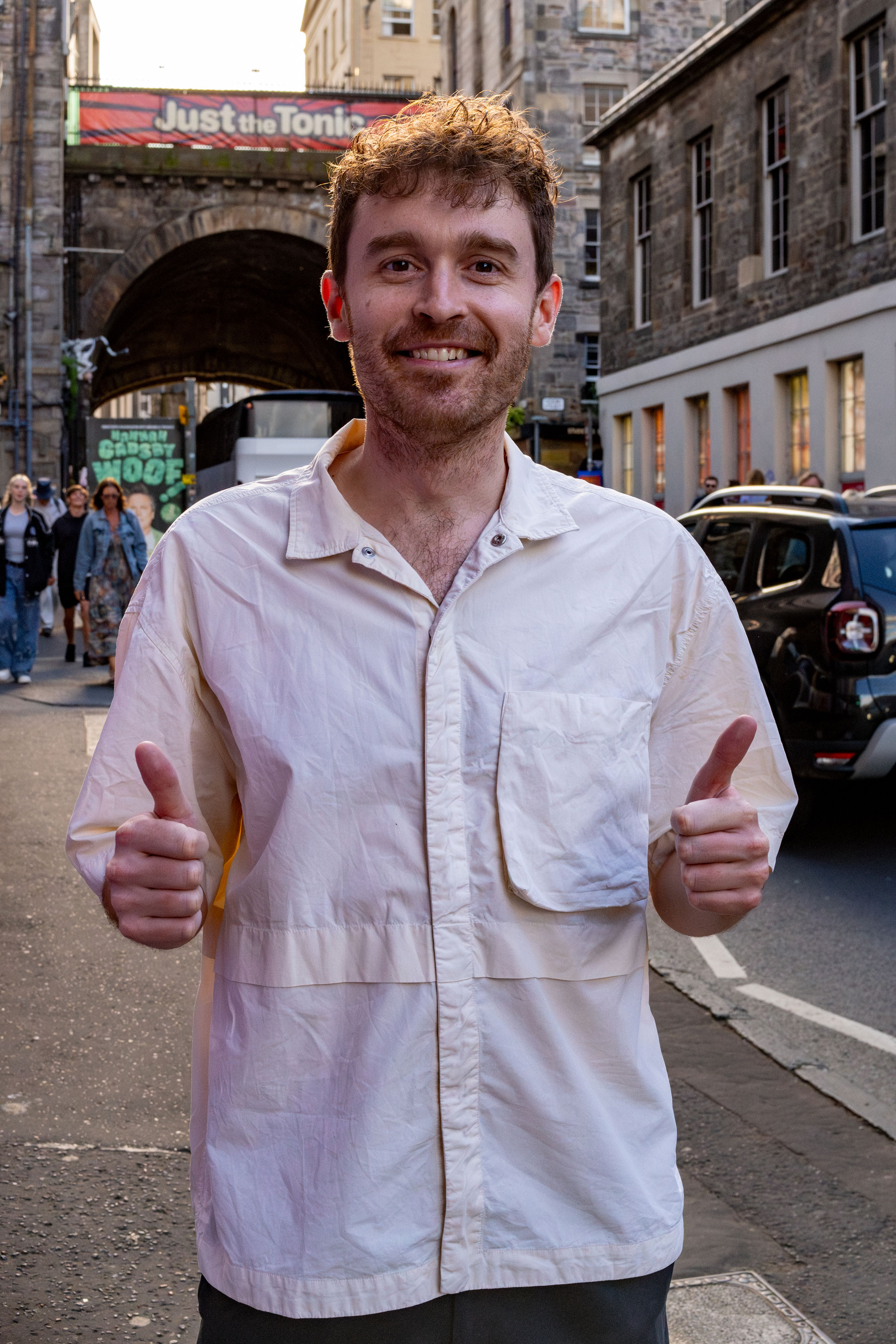
- Cashman in 2024
- Born: Thomas James Cashman; 14 September 1989 (age 37); Sydney, Australia

Comedy career
- Medium: comedy, television, podcasting, TikTok

Thomas James Cashman (born 14 September 1989) is an Australian stand-up comedian and writer. He gained popularity in 2022 with a series of videos posted on TikTok about his request for a landlord reference. Since 2023 he has been the co-host and co-writer of the Australian version of television series Taskmaster.

== Early life ==
Cashman's father is a maths teacher and his mother, Kerri Lynn Parnell, a general practitioner. She died in June 2017. Cashman also has a younger sister, Helen, who is also a doctor. His first job was refereeing basketball. During his university studies, Cashman did an exchange in London.

== Career ==
Cashman studied law at the University of Sydney, earning a Bachelor of Laws degree, and worked as a qualified lawyer until 2021 before moving full-time into comedy.

Cashman has appeared as a regular host on The Project, and has guested on The Hundred with Andy Lee, Question Everything, Celebrity Letters & Numbers, and Tonightly with Tom Ballard. Cashman was also on the writing team for Planet America, Tonightly with Tom Ballard, and ABC's Win the Week. In April 2020, Cashman began hosting The Good Stuff podcast, alongside fellow comic Sam Taunton. The podcast was later renamed The Really Good Stuff.

In 2022, Cashman began presenting a regular segment on Triple J. Also in 2022, Cashman began the show "All Comedians Are Beautiful" with his The Good Stuff co-host Sam Taunton. This weekly performance in the Sydney suburb of Chippendale began as a trial run for the comics' individual shows, and then developed into the duo compèring for a variety of other comedians.

Cashman's comedy shows include Good (2018), XYZ (2019), Graphs (renamed Pests) (2022), and NPC (Nearly Proficient Comedian) (2026). Parts of NPC were shown to the Taskmaster Australia audience.

In February 2023, Taskmaster Australia began airing on Network 10, with Cashman in the role of the Taskmaster's assistant. A running joke on the show is that Taskmaster Tom Gleeson addresses Cashman as "Lesser Tom."

=== Landlord reference saga ===
During Sydney's second lockdown during the COVID-19 pandemic, Cashman began making videos on the social media app TikTok, with his "landlord reference saga" gaining particular traction. In these videos, Cashman asked a prospective landlord for a reference written by a previous tenant, and shared their response. In addition to garnering millions of views, the videos inspired ACT politician Michael Pettersson to introduce a motion to the ACT Legislative Assembly which would allow renters to ask for references from prospective landlords. The motion was rejected.

This media spectacle became the basis for his show Graphs, which was later recorded and released in 2024 as Pests.

=== Flat white saga ===
In 2025, Cashman got into hot water by controversially asserting that Sydney invented the "flat white" in a TikTok. He was later interviewed on prime time New Zealand television by "Mother of the Nation" Hilary Barry on Seven Sharp, where he came face to face with the alleged New Zealand flat white inventor. Cashman declared a draw in the interview after conceding that the name "flat white" was from Australia but the recipe known today is from New Zealand.
