= Celebrity Name Game (Australian game show) =

2019–2020 Australian game show

- Genre: Game show
- Based on: Celebrity Name Game
- Written by: Henry Stone
- Directed by: Peter Ots
- Creative director: Jennifer Collins
- Presented by: Grant Denyer
- Theme music composer: Tim Mosher & Stoker
- Country of origin: Australia
- Original language: English
- No. of episodes: 144

Production
- Executive producers: Caroline Spencer; Dan Sheldon; Maria Michael
- Producers: Catherine Bradbury; Paul Millgate
- Production locations: Sydney, New South Wales
- Camera setup: Multi-camera
- Running time: 30 minutes
- Production company: FremantleMedia Australia

Original release
- Network: Network 10
- Release: 13 May 2019 – 16 March 2020

Celebrity Name Game is an Australian game show based on the American show of the same name and the board game Identity Crisis (created by Laura Robinson and Richard Gerrits) hosted by Grant Denyer and aired on Network 10 from 13 May 2019 until 16 March 2020.

== Gameplay ==
=== Main game ===
The game involves two teams, each consisting of two contestants who are related or know each other. They are joined by two guest celebrities who assist the teams for all but the third segment of the show, attempting to identify the names of popular culture subjects like celebrities, fictional characters, place names, or film and television titles.

In the first two rounds, each team is assigned one of the celebrities, who then will switch teams for the second round. Each of the three-member teams are presented with a category containing ten names. One person will give clues, trying to get the other two to guess the names. Successful guesses earn money. An illegal clue (saying the name or part of the name, spelling the name, or rhyming the name) voids that name. Each turn lasts for 45 seconds. In the first round, one team is chosen to play first, and chooses one of two categories presented, leaving the second team to play the remaining category. In the second round, the second team plays first and chooses the first category.

In round one, the celebrity gives the clues while turning back and forth to alternately face each contestant, and each correct answer is worth $100, up to $1,000 total. In round two, one of the two contestants gives clues while alternately facing either the remaining partner or the assigned celebrity, and each answer is worth $200, up to $2,000 total.

In the third round, the contestants go head to head while Denyer gives the clues to names under a specific category. The contestants buzz in to make a guess. If neither contestant buzzes in after a while, Denyer can start giving out clues that are normally illegal, all the way up to simply saying the name. A right answer earns money for the team that answered, but a wrong answer grants the money to the opponent. The first answer is worth $100 and each successive answer increases in value by $100. Winnings in this round are added to the money accumulated in the first two rounds, and whichever team reaches $3,000 or more first is the winner, keeps the cash, and goes on to the bonus round to play for the prize of $10,000. If no team reaches $3,000 before time is called, the team in the lead at the end of the round wins the game. If the game ends in a tie, one final name is given; a team who buzzes in with a correct answer wins the game, but a wrong answer results in an automatic loss.

=== Bonus round ===
In the bonus round, there is no particular category. The names of people, characters, places, shows or things are hidden behind ten numbered squares. The contestants take turns giving the clues to both celebrities. One contestant is placed in a soundproof booth while the other gives clues. The current giver starts describing when a name or picture is exposed. If the celebrity receivers get it right, the name stays revealed. Passing on a name re-conceals it. This round lasts for a total of 75 seconds, the first contestant has 45 seconds, and the second has 30 seconds. If the first clue giver provides an illegal clue to a name, that name is replaced by a different one for the second clue giver. Any illegal clue by the second clue giver, however, ends the round immediately. Getting all ten increases the team's total winnings to $10,000. If the first contestant correctly guesses all ten names within 45 seconds or less, the second portion of the round is not played. Otherwise, the team takes home only the amount they had earned by the end of Round 3.

== Production and broadcast ==
Celebrity Name Game aired in a 6:00 pm timeslot and was broadcast five nights a week from Mondays to Fridays, with repeats aired at 8:00 am the following morning (Friday shows airing on Monday mornings). The show was filmed at Network 10's studios in Pyrmont, Sydney.

== Merchandise ==
A board game featuring Denyer on the cover was released by Imagination Gaming in 2019.

== Episodes ==
No.	Celebrities	Timeslot	Original release date	Viewers
1	Tommy Little & Lisa Wilkinson	6pm Monday	13 May 2019	314,000
2	Beau Ryan & Sam Simmons	6pm Tuesday	14 May 2019	248,000
3	Yvie Jones & Angie Kent	6pm Wednesday	15 May 2019	248,000
4	Lawrence Leung & Scott Tweedie	6pm Thursday	16 May 2019	258,000
5	Sharna Burgess & Tristan MacManus	6pm Friday	17 May 2019	227,000
6	Courtney Act & Tahir Bilgiç	6pm Monday	20 May 2019	246,000
7	Susie Youssef & Jane Hall	6pm Tuesday	21 May 2019	231,000
8	Ed Kavalee & Ash London	6pm Wednesday	22 May 2019	235,000
9	Olympia Valance & Merrick Watts	6pm Thursday	23 May 2019	243,000
10	Peter Rowsthorn & Matty Johnson	6pm Friday	24 May 2019	200,000
11	Tom Ballard & Lucy Durack	6pm Monday	27 May 2019	275,000
12	Yvie Jones & Gina Liano	6pm Tuesday	28 May 2019	266,000
13	Brendan Jones & Casey Donovan	6pm Wednesday	29 May 2019	240,000
14	Denise Drysdale & Jessica Rowe	6pm Thursday	30 May 2019	232,000
15	Johnny Ruffo & Rhonda Burchmore	6pm Friday	31 May 2019	214,000
16	Sam Simmons & Jay Pharoah	6pm Monday	3 June 2019	298,000
17	Courtney Act & Beau Ryan	6pm Tuesday	4 June 2019	298,000
18	Sarah Harris & Angela Bishop	6pm Wednesday	5 June 2019	292,000
19	Annie Maynard & Olympia Valance	6pm Thursday	6 June 2019	234,000
20	Tommy Little & Stephanie Rice	6pm Friday	7 June 2019	TBC
21	The Umbilical Brothers	6pm Monday	10 June 2019	276,000
22	Tim Blackwell & Michelle Bridges	6pm Tuesday	11 June 2019	274,000
23	Nazeem Hussain & Nikki Osborne	6pm Wednesday	12 June 2019	251,000
24	Paul Fenech & Harley Breen	6pm Thursday	13 June 2019	224,000
25	Rhonda Burchmore & Cal Wilson	6pm Friday	14 June 2019	TBC
26	Ed Kavalee & Ash London	6pm Monday	17 June 2019	258,000
27	Natarsha Belling & Peter Rowsthorn	6pm Tuesday	18 June 2019	245,000
28	Susie Youssef & Brendan Jones	6pm Wednesday	19 June 2019	240,000
29	Merv Hughes & Tom Ballard	6pm Thursday	20 June 2019	246,000
30	Casey Donovan & Amos Gill	6pm Friday	21 June 2019	TBC
31	Beau Ryan & Tahir Bilgiç	6pm Monday	24 June 2019	275,000
32	Alan Fletcher & Ryan Moloney	6pm Tuesday	25 June 2019	242,000
33	Hans & Dave Thornton	6pm Wednesday	26 June 2019	246,000
34	Nath Valvo & Lisa Curry	6pm Thursday	27 June 2019	238,000
35	Tristan MacManus & Sharna Burgess	6pm Friday	28 June 2019	TBC
36	Michelle Bridges & Steve Willis	6pm Monday	1 July 2019	234,000
37	Cal Wilson & Johnny Ruffo	6pm Tuesday	2 July 2019	260,000
38	Gyton Grantley & Tanya Hennessy	6pm Wednesday	3 July 2019	243,000
39	Gary Mehigan & Matt Sinclair	6pm Thursday	4 July 2019	229,000
40	The Umbilical Brothers	6pm Friday	5 July 2019	N/A
41	Gary Mehigan & Julie Goodwin	6pm Monday	8 July 2019	260,000
42	Lucy Durack & Merv Hughes	6pm Tuesday	9 July 2019	247,000
43	Damian Walshe-Howling & Ivan Aristeguieta	6pm Wednesday	10 July 2019	238,000
44	George Calombaris & Anna Polyviou	6pm Thursday	11 July 2019	235,000
45	Angie Kent & Yvie Jones	6pm Friday	12 July 2019	N/A
46	Rove McManus & Peter Helliar	6pm Monday	15 July 2019	259,000
47	Gina Liano & Lawrence Leung	6pm Tuesday	16 July 2019	219,000
48	Gary Mehigan & George Calombaris	6pm Wednesday	17 July 2019	253,000
49	Casey Donovan & Susie Youssef	6pm Thursday	18 July 2019	260,000
50	Tim Blackwell & Georgie Carroll	6pm Friday	19 July 2019	201,000
51	Melody Thornton & Justin Lacko	6pm Monday	22 July 2019	230,000
52	Julie Goodwin & George Calombaris	6pm Tuesday	23 July 2019	237,000
53	Tim Blackwell & Steve Willis	6pm Wednesday	24 July 2019	242,000
54	Tom Ballard & Scott Tweedie	6pm Thursday	25 July 2019	247,000
55	Denise Drysdale & Natalie Bassingthwaighte	6pm Friday	26 July 2019	N/A
56	Jay Pharoah & Nikki Osborne	6pm Monday	29 July 2019	193,000
57	Will McMahon & Woody Whitelaw	6pm Tuesday	30 July 2019	227,000
58	John Edward & Osher Günsberg	6pm Wednesday	31 July 2019	227,000
59	Dave O'Neil & Joe Hildebrand	6pm Thursday	1 August 2019	
60	Anthony Callea & James Mathison	6pm Friday	2 August 2019	
61	Vicky Pattison & Shannon Noll	6pm Monday	5 August 2019	
62	Harley Breen & Denise Drysdale	6pm Tuesday	6 August 2019	
63	Bernard Curry & Ebony Vagulans	6pm Wednesday	7 August 2019	
64	James Mathison & Tim Campbell	6pm Thursday	8 August 2019	
65	Veronica Milsom & Lewis Hobba	6pm Friday	9 August 2019	N/A
66	Celia Pacquola & Sam Simmons	6pm Monday	12 August 2019	
Note: Rove McManus replaced Grant Denyer as host.
67	Dave Thornton & Steven Bradbury	6pm Tuesday	13 August 2019	
Note: Rove McManus replaced Grant Denyer as host.
68	Georgia Love & Lee Elliot	6pm Wednesday	14 August 2019	
Note: Rove McManus replaced Grant Denyer as host.
69	Dylan Lewis & Kent Small	6pm Thursday	15 August 2019	
Note: Rove McManus replaced Grant Denyer as host.
70	Ash Pollard & Steen Raskopoulos	6pm Friday	16 August 2019	N/A
Note: Rove McManus replaced Grant Denyer as host.
71	Matt Farrelly & Steven Bradbury	6pm Monday	19 August 2019	206,000
Note: Rove McManus replaced Grant Denyer as host.
72	Janine Allis & Andrew Ettingshausen	6pm Tuesday	20 August 2019	235,000
Note: Rove McManus replaced Grant Denyer as host.
73	Nazeem Hussain & Ash Pollard	6pm Wednesday	21 August 2019	214,000
Note: Rove McManus replaced Grant Denyer as host.
74	Dave Thornton & Bonnie Lythgoe	6pm Thursday	22 August 2019	202,000
Note: Rove McManus replaced Grant Denyer as host.
75	Alexandra Jae & Alex Lee	6pm Friday	23 August 2019	
Note: Rove McManus replaced Grant Denyer as host.
76	Vicky Pattison & Ian "Dicko" Dickson	6pm Monday	26 August 2019	232,000
77	The Umbilical Brothers	6pm Tuesday	27 August 2019	224,000
78	Mel Buttle & Bernard Curry	6pm Wednesday	28 August 2019	237,000
79	Alan Fletcher & Bonnie Anderson	6pm Thursday	29 August 2019	193,000
80	Matt Burke & David Campese	6pm Friday	30 August 2019	
81	Woody Whitelaw & Will McMahon	6pm Monday	2 September 2019	220,000
82	Jimeoin & Damian Walshe-Howling	6pm Tuesday	3 September 2019	231,000
83	Liz Ellis & Catherine Cox	6pm Wednesday	4 September 2019	214,000
84	Yvie Jones & Scott Tweedie	6pm Thursday	5 September 2019	217,000
85	Merrick Watts & Annie Maynard	6pm Friday	6 September 2019	
86	Erika Heynatz & David Collins	6pm Monday	9 September 2019	231,000
87	Nicola Parry & Heidi Arena	6pm Tuesday	10 September 2019	220,000
88	Roxy Jacenko & Wippa	6pm Wednesday	11 September 2019	190,000
89	Sarah Harris & Stephanie Rice	6pm Thursday	12 September 2019	212,000
90	Richard Reid & Angela Bishop	6pm Friday	13 September 2019	
91	Rove McManus & Stacey Thomson	6pm Monday	16 September 2019	193,000
92	Sam Simmons & Tahir Bilgiç	6pm Tuesday	17 September 2019	210,000
93	John Foreman & Christie Whelan Browne	6pm Wednesday	18 September 2019	209,000
94	Jett Kenny & Tanya Hennesy	6pm Thursday	19 September 2019	199,000
95	Gyton Grantley & Nath Valvo	6pm Friday	20 September 2019	
96	Dave Hughes & Charlie Pickering	6pm Monday	23 September 2019	199,000
97	Dannii Minogue & Osher Günsberg	6pm Tuesday	24 September 2019	211,000
98	Luke McGregor & Chris Brown	6pm Wednesday	25 September 2019	195,000
99	Nazeem Hussain & Nikki Britton	6pm Thursday	26 September 2019	172,000
100	Gretel Killeen & Joe Hildebrand	6pm Friday	27 September 2019	
101	Kate McCartney & Kate McLennan	6pm Monday	30 September 2019	234,000
102	Lawrence Leung & Steen Raskopoulos	6pm Tuesday	1 October 2019	202,000
103	Rob Mills & Ryan Moloney	6pm Wednesday	2 October 2019	193,000
104	Hans & Melissa Tkautz	6pm Thursday	3 October 2019	174,000
105	Anthony "Harries" Carroll & Bruce "Hoppo" Hopkins	6pm Friday	4 October 2019	
106	Harley Breen & Patrick Abboud	6pm Monday	7 October 2019	173,000
107	Anthony "Lehmo" Lehmann & Nikki Britton	6pm Tuesday	8 October 2019	178,000
108	Catherine Cox & Liz Ellis	6pm Wednesday	9 October 2019	174,000
109	Scott McLaughlin & David Reynolds	6pm Thursday	10 October 2019	160,000
110	Tim Campbell & Anthony Callea	6pm Friday	11 October 2019	
111	Susie Youssef & Gen Fricker	6pm Monday	14 October 2019	199,000
112	Shannon Noll & Ian "Dicko" Dickson	6pm Tuesday	15 October 2019	182,000
113	Colin Lane & Melinda Schneider	6pm Wednesday	16 October 2019	189,000
114	Yvie Jones & Angie Kent	6pm Thursday	17 October 2019	166,000
115	Sandra Sully & Matt Burke	6pm Friday	18 October 2019	
116	Osher Günsberg & Melody Thornton	6pm Monday	21 October 2019	193,000
117	Mel Buttle & Stacey Thomson	6pm Tuesday	22 October 2019	176,000
118	Peter Helliar & Rove McManus	6pm Wednesday	23 October 2019	166,000
119	Anne Edmonds & Jimeoin	6pm Thursday	24 October 2019	152,000
120	Scott McLaughlin & Rick Kelly	6pm Friday	25 October 2019	
121	Beau Ryan & Nina Oyama	6pm Monday	28 October 2019	209,000
122	Joel Creasey & Claire Hooper	6pm Tuesday	29 October 2019	183,000
123	Dave O'Neil & Emily Taheny	6pm Wednesday	30 October 2019	163,000
124	Tanya Hennessy & Liv Phyland	6pm Thursday	31 October 2019	172,000
125	Ben Harvey & Liam Stapleton	6pm Friday	1 November 2019	
126	Scott Tweedie & Kate Peck	6pm Monday	4 November 2019	178,000
127	Matt White & Roz Kelly	6pm Wednesday	6 November 2019	141,000
128	Ian "Dicko" Dickson & Lydia Lassila	6pm Friday	8 November 2019	
129	Amanda Keller & Brendan Jones	6pm Monday	11 November 2019	171,000
130	Luke McGregor & Jess Harris	6pm Tuesday	12 November 2019	128,000
131	Angie Kent & Susie Youssef	6pm Wednesday	13 November 2019	158,000
132	The Umbilical Brothers	6pm Thursday	14 November 2019	193,000
133	Harley Breen & Heath Franklin	6pm Friday	15 November 2019	
134	Mel Buttle & Matt Moran	6pm Monday	18 November 2019	174,000
135	Kerri-Anne Kennerly & Jan Fran	6pm Tuesday	19 November 2019	179,000
136	Costa Georgiadis & Gen Fricker	6pm Wednesday	20 November 2019	188,000
137	Emmylou MacCarthy & Christian Hull	6pm Thursday	21 November 2019	168,000
138	David Reynolds & Garth Tander	6pm Friday	22 November 2019	
139	Beau Ryan & Rob Shehadie	6pm Monday	25 November 2019	199,000
140	Angela Bishop & Dave Thornton	6pm Tuesday	26 November 2019	170,000
141	Dilruk Jayasinha & Annie Maynard	6pm Wednesday	27 November 2019	177,000
142	Anthony Mundine & Anthony "Lehmo" Lehmann	6pm Thursday	28 November 2019	152,000
143	Kate McCartney & Jane Hall	6pm Friday	29 November 2019	
144	Neighbours 35th Anniversary; Ryan Moloney, April Rose Pengilly, Ben Hall & Stefan Dennis	6pm Monday	16 March 2020	TBC
