= The Fantastic Leslie =

Australia's popular and successful comedians and musicians

Background information
- Origin: Sydney
- Genre: Musical comedy
- Years active: 1999– 2003
- Label: Independent/MGM Distribution
- Past members: Andrew Hansen; Cameron Bruce; James Fletcher; Tom Gleeson; Bruce Braybrooke
- Website: Official site

The Fantastic Leslie was a four-piece band from Sydney, Australia and was the starting point for three of Australia's popular and successful comedians and musicians.

== Biography ==
The group formed in 1999, with Cameron Bruce, Andrew Hansen, Tom Gleeson and James Fletcher, who were all studying at Sydney University. Hansen was the guitarist, played the kazoo and was one of the vocalists, Bruce's expertise lay in the field of playing piano and vocals, Gleeson was the drummer and Fletcher played bass.

That was a band that already existed at Uni – I think they were called the Canoe Club then. The piano player left, and I was asked to join. We changed the name, and went from there – getting our first gigs and playing for free.

— Cameron Bruce

The band's new name was due to the band members having a mutual friend whom they'd refer to as "the fantastic Leslie". Cameron Bruce also used a Leslie amplifier, so the name had a double meaning.

They released their debut and only recording, an EP, A Tiny Mark, on 1 July 1999. A Tiny Mark consisted of six tracks – five original tracks as well as "Moving Right Along", a song from The Muppet Movie. It was produced by Michael Carpenter, mastered by Don Bartley, and distributed through MGM Distribution.

Tom Gleeson left the band in September 2000 to pursue his comedy career, and was replaced by Bruce Braybrooke. Gleeson went on to perform in skitHOUSE, as well as numerous Australian Comedy Tours, Melbourne International Comedy Festivals and Adelaide Fringe Festivals.

The band recorded only two other released tracks: "The Fantastic Leslie Theme Song" and a cover of the Nick Drake song, "At the Chime of the City Clock". These were respectively released on Grow Your Own 2000 and Jeremy Flies; A Tribute to Nick Drake.

They split in about 2003, when they were beginning to actively pursue their own careers. In an interview with The Age Hansen admitted he was a frustrated musician and related to his times with The Fantastic Leslie.

I think we lost more money than we made.

— Andrew Hansen

=== Post Leslie ===
Andrew Hansen is a member of The Chaser team, who have produced six TV shows, Andrew being in five of them, including Logie Award winning CNNNN and AFI Award winning The Chaser's War on Everything, as well as three musicals/stage shows, including The Chaser's Age of Terror Variety Hour which toured Australia in 2008.

Cameron Bruce, after leaving The Fantastic Leslie, joined Karma County as part of the backing band for a Carole King Tribute show, Tapestry. He has also been a part-time floating member of Pinky Beecroft's White Russians, and the Beautiful Girls. He was a third of comedy/musical trio GUD, along with Paul McDermott and Mick Moriarty, and progressed onto playing in his own and Paul Kelly's band, and playing keyboards for both Good News Week and The Sideshow.

Tom Gleeson had a long-running quiz show on the ABC called Hard Quiz, a spin off of his segment on The Weekly with Charlie Pickering named Hard Chat. In 2019 he won the Gold Logie Award for Most Popular Personality on Australian Television.

Bruce Braybrooke became the drummer in The Beautiful Girls.

James Fletcher became a news reporter for the BBC Radio in London.

They had no plans for a reunion; however, Fletcher has said that nothing is impossible when it comes to a gig.

Andrew Hansen, Tom Gleeson and Cameron Bruce appeared together on an episode of GNW on 19 October 2009 playing in the segment, Strange but True.

== Discography ==
=== Albums ===
- A Tiny Mark – Independent/MGM Distribution (1999)

==== Tracks ====
1. "Sea Shanty" was "Not strictly a sea shanty in the original pirate meaning of the term. More a pop/rock toe-tapper."
2. "First World Blues", composed and sung by Andrew Hansen, was about how "People in the first world have their own problems. Having no souls, for instance."
3. "Great Life", also composed and sung by Andrew Hansen, was "about how tough everything is, but how rock n roll makes it all better again." He aimed to give the song an Australian rock and roll feel.
4. "Weatherman", was written and performed by Cameron Bruce. In an interview, it was revealed it was inspired by how "I once knew a guy who left nothing to chance. He used to plan his days around the weather and what he would eat for lunch. Now he wears a suit."
5. "Turning to Gold", which Cameron Bruce described as about "...that I hardly recognise the things that I see, I hardly know who this is talking to me...and those exact same words are used in the song."
6. "Moving Right Along" was a "song from The Muppet Movie. You just tap your shoes, shake your booty, shut your eyes and think of Fozzie", according to Cameron Bruce.

=== Contributions ===
- Grow Your Own – Vol. 5 Foghorn Records (2000) – "The Fantastic Leslie Theme Song"
- Jeremy Flies: A Tribute To Nick Drake – Arcadia Records (2003) – "At the Chime of the City Clock"
