= ADbc =

2009–2010 Australian comedy quiz TV series

- Genre: Quiz show
- Presented by: Sam Pang
- Country of origin: Australia
- Original language: English
- No. of seasons: 1
- No. of episodes: 26

Production
- Running time: 30 minutes (including commercials)

Original release
- Network: SBS One
- Release: 27 August 2009 – 31 October 2010

ADbc is an Australian television comedy history quiz show hosted by Sam Pang. It was first broadcast on SBS One in 2009.

== Summary ==
There are two teams of two contestants, the AD team and the bc team. Each team consists of an academic and a celebrity working together in an attempt to win the game. ADbc is full of facts and games that inspire some intelligent discussion and some blatantly silly behaviour.

== Cast ==
Sam Pang is a presenter, writer, broadcaster and producer.

Regular panellists include:

- Meshel Laurie
- Tony Martin
- Dr Andrea Rizzi of Melbourne University
- Professor Graeme Davison from Monash University
- Writer Alice Pung.

Other guests include Matt Preston, Kate Langbroek, Judith Lucy, Graeme Blundell, Celia Pacquola, Andrew Rule, Angus Sampson, George McEncroe, Santo Cilauro and Merrick Watts.
