= Dave Thornton =

Australian comedian (born 1979)

- Born: 13 December 1979 (age 46); Geelong, Victoria
- Education: Design and Art at the Gordon Institute of TAFE
- Occupations: Comedian; actor; television and radio presenter
- Partner: Nixi
- Children: 2

Dave Thornton (born 13 December 1979) is an Australian stand-up comedian, actor, television and radio presenter. He has performed stand-up comedy throughout Australia, in Edinburgh, Singapore and New York. He has also appeared on Australian television and radio.

== Career ==
=== Stand-up comedy ===
Thornton began working in stand-up comedy at the Geelong heats of Raw Comedy in 2002. He debuted his solo hour-long show Euro:mission, which was based on his experiences as a backpacking traveler, at the 2007 Melbourne International Comedy Festival, where he was nominated for 'Best Newcomer'. Thornton has performed at the MICF every year since, and in 2009 debuted at the Edinburgh Fringe Festival with a new show, Allow Me to Introduce Myself.

He has also performed stand-up comedy on TV shows including Good Morning Australia (Network 10) in 2006, Stand Up Australia (Comedy Channel Australia) in 2007 and Rove (Network 10) in 2008.

=== Radio ===
In October 2009, Thornton began hosting a Sunday evening show on Nova 100 in Melbourne. He then became a fill-in co-host for Nova nationally on the breakfast shift during December leading up to Christmas hosting with Dylan Lewis and Sophie Monk.

In January 2010, Thornton filled in for Ash Bradnam on Nova 106.9 in Brisbane for 6 weeks with Tim Blackwell and Meshel Laurie. In July 2010, he started hosting a Saturday morning breakfast show 'Saturday Sessions' nationally on Nova from 10am – 12pm with comedian Mel Buttle. He was also a regular fill in presenter for Matt Tilley on The Matt and Jo Show on FOX FM.

In September 2013, Thornton began hosting Weekend Breakfast with Sophie Monk on the Today Network.

In November 2013, Southern Cross Austereo announced that Thornton and Fifi Box will co-host Fifi & Dave on FOX FM in 2014. In 2016, Brendan Fevola joined the show and it was renamed Fifi, Dave & Fev. In 2017, Byron Cooke had his name added to the title and it was renamed to Fifi, Dave, Fev & Byron.

In September 2017, Thornton announced his resignation from Fox FM.

=== Television ===
Thornton has appeared as a panelist on shows including Good News Week, ADbc, Talkin' 'Bout Your Generation, The White Room, This Week Live, All Star Family Feud, Celebrity Name Game, Studio 10, The Project, Show Me the Movie! and Hughesy, We Have a Problem.

In 2007, Thornton debuted on Channel 9's Comedy Inc. as a replacement for Jim Russell. This was followed the next year with a role in the ABC television drama Bed of Roses, as Shannon Atherton, an injured 24-year-old AFL player who had found himself in trouble and returned home to the series fictional town Rainbow's End and to his mum (played by Kerry Armstrong).

He also hosted the first 3 seasons of Studio A, a live chat show produced at RMITV studios. Featuring guests such as Rove McManus, Tony Martin and the former Melbourne Mayor John So, the show won 'Programme of the Year' at the 2009 Channel 31 Antenna Awards.

In 2013 and 2014, Thornton had a recurring role in the ABC comedy series Upper Middle Bogan as Troy Van Winkle. In 2025 he appeared as a contestant on Claire Hooper's House Of Games.

=== Podcast ===
From 2011 until 2013, Thornton collaborated on a free weekly podcast, Slapbang Radio with fellow comedian Tommy Little.

== Personal life ==
Thornton was born in Geelong, Victoria to Ineke and Peter Thornton. He attended Belmont High School and studied Design and Art at the Gordon Institute of TAFE.

In July 2015, Thornton announced that he was engaged to girlfriend Nixi.

Thornton is a fan of the Geelong Football Club in the AFL.

== Recognition ==
In his review of the 2006 Melbourne International Comedy Festival, Tim Hunter of The Age wrote "Dave Thornton is the funniest. He's self-deprecating and engaging, and delivered the biggest laugh of the show: an impersonation of Dave Hughes, which is a worry in itself." Erin White of Australian Stage noted that "Thornton's performance is quintessentially Australian".

Melissa Phillips of East Torrens Messenger wrote of Thornton's A Different Type of Normal, that "Thornton's show has a real soft side and it's his family stories that hit home with plenty of honesty," while Melissa Mack of The Independent Weekly' wrote "Thornton tackles an interesting subject which is surprising and at times confronting, but always witty. His show is mostly about family and his very Australian style of comedy also has a deeply personal touch". Rove Daily writes that "Dave Thornton is one of Australia's most exciting young stand-up comics".

=== Awards and nominations ===
- 2005, Search For Funny Bone Winner
- 2005, Angling For a Laugh Winner
- 2006, Campus Comedian of the Year (TREV Awards) Winner
- 2007, Nominated for 'Best Newcomer' at the Melbourne International Comedy Festival
