= Tanya Hennessy =

Australian digital content creator, comedian, writer and television presenter

- Born: 1985 (age 40–41); Newcastle, New South Wales, Australia
- Notable work: I'm a Celebrity...Get Me Out of Here! Drunk History Australia; Hughesy, We Have a Problem; Studio 10
- Spouse: Tom Poole (m. 2024)
- Children: 1

Comedy career
- Years active: 2010–present
- Medium: Digital content creator; radio announcer; comedian; television presenter; author; actor
- Genres: Digital media, social media, observational comedy, parody and satirical comedy

Tanya Hennessy (born 1985) is an Australian digital content creator, comedian, writer and television presenter who works in Australia. Hennessy taught drama and worked in theatre as a stage manager at the Edinburgh Festival Fringe before switching to a career in radio announcing. She worked for Southern Cross Austereo and the HIT Network commercial radio stations in Newcastle, Griffith, Toowoomba and Canberra.

She is best known for her comedy videos including Everyday Makeup Tutorial, Get A Real Job and Things People Say on Facebook, YouTube and Instagram, and as a celebrity competitor in the Australian version of I'm a Celebrity...Get Me Out of Here!

On 14 October 2025, Hennessy was named in the cast for the animated film Zac Power.

== Personal life ==
In September 2024, Hennessey married long term partner Tom Poole. They have a one child, a daughter born in December 2025, after a seven-year fertility struggle.

== Career ==
Hennessy performed in the television series Drunk History Australia and The Unboxing, and appeared as herself in Hughesy, We Have a Problem, The Daily Talk Show and Chris & Julia's Sunday Night Takeaway. Hennessy hosted The Bachelor: UNPACKED on Channel 10 and guest hosted on Studio 10 and The Loop.

== Awards and nominations ==
Digital media
Year	Award	Category	Work	Result	Role	Ref.
2017	Video Junkee Awards	The Breakthrough Award	Video content creator for an online video or series	Won	Writer, presenter	

Radio
Year	Award	Category	Work	Result	Role	Ref.
2017	Australian Commercial Radio Awards	Best Radio Documentary	Braden's Story- Ryan Jon, Tanya Hennessy and Joe Gleeson (hit104.7 Canberra)	Won	Writer, presenter	
2018	Australian Commercial Radio Awards	Best Entertainment Presenter	hit104.7 Canberra Breakfast	Won	Writer, presenter	

== Radio ==
Radio broadcasting
Year	Radio station	Role	Notes
2011	Newcastle community radio	Volunteer mid-dawn and breakfast show producer	
2012	NXFM 106.9	Panellist for Fifi Box and Jules Lund	
2012	NXFM 106.9	Co-announcer with Jules Lund and Dan Debuf	
2013	2DayFM 104.1	Panellist for Dan Debuf and Maz Compton	
2014	Griffith radio station	Breakfast show presenter and producer	
2015	Toowoomba radio station	Producer and panellist	
2016	Canberra 104.7	Producer, presenter and panellist for Breakfast with Ryan and Tanya	

== Stage ==
Comedy Tours
Year	Title	Role	Notes
2019	Low Expectations	Writer/performer	Comedy show with comedian and content creator Christian Hull, toured in Australia and New Zealand

== Filmography ==
Television/Film
Year	Title	Role	Notes
2019	Chris & Julia's Sunday Night Takeaway	Herself	1 episode
2019	The Daily Talk Show	Herself	1 episode
2019	The Unboxing	Camilla	
2019	33rd Annual ARIA Music Awards 2019	Presenter for Best Comedy Release	1 episode
2020	I'm a Celebrity...Get Me Out of Here!	Herself	17 episodes
2020	Hughesy, We Have a Problem	Herself	1 episode
2020	Drunk History Australia	Christina MacPherson	1 episode
2020	The Project	Herself	1 episode
2021	Celebrity Letters and Numbers	Herself: Contestant	1 episode
2021	2021 AACTA Awards: Industry Awards category	Herself: Presenter	1 episode
2023	Wellmania	Greta	TV series 1 episode (1.7)
2023	Jones Family Christmas	Fanny	TV movie
2025	Bump A Christmas Film	Drug Dealer	
2025	Sunny Nights	Shelley	TV series 1 episode (1.6)
2027	Zac Power	Pamdemic	

== Podcasts ==
Podcasting
Year	Title	Role	Notes
2019	Shameless with Zara McDonald and Michelle Andrews, IN CONVERSATION: Tanya Hennessy	Herself (guest)	1 episode
2020	Better Than Yesterday with Osher Günsberg	Herself (guest)	1 episode
2020	I Can't Stop with Tanya Hennessy and Steph Tisdell	Writer/Presenter	
2022	Hennessy's Hotline	Writer/Presenter	

== Books ==
- 2018: Am I Doing This Right?: Life Lessons from the Encyclopedia Bri-Tanya by Tanya Hennessy (ISBN 1760632236)
- 2020: Help Self: Learn from my mistakes so you can make different ones! by Tanya Hennessy (ISBN 9781760876630)
- 2021: Drum Roll Please, It's Stevie Louise by Tanya Hennessy (ISBN 9781760526412)
