= Dilruk Jayasinha =

Sri Lankan comedian

- Born: Sri Lanka
- Occupations: Comedian; Actor
- Years active: 2010—present
- Awards: Logie Award for Most Popular New Talent 2018
- Website: dilruk.com.au

Dilruk Jayasinha is a Sri Lankan Australian comedian, actor, and former accountant. He is known for his role as Ashan on the ABC TV series Utopia.

== Early life and education ==
Dilruk Jayasinha was born in Sri Lanka.

He relocated to Melbourne to attend university, before working for a major accounting firm. It was at this time that he realised his heart was not in accounting, but in comedy.

== Career ==
Jayasinha has appeared on television programs Sammy J & Randy in Ricketts Lane, Live on Bowen, My Life Is Murder, The Project, All Star Family Feud, Celebrity Name Game, Have You Been Paying Attention? and Hughesy, We Have a Problem, as well performing at the Melbourne International Comedy Festival.

He is known for his role as Ashan on the ABC TV series Utopia.

In 2019, Jayasinha toured his comedy show Cheat Days. He was also the host of the 2019 Antenna Awards, honouring the best in Australian community television.

In 2020, Jayasinha appeared in the sixth season of the Australian version of I'm a Celebrity...Get Me Out of Here! and was eliminated first. He then toured his new comedy show Victorious Lion.

In 2021, Jayasinha appeared in the second series of Celebrity MasterChef Australia. In 2025 he appeared as a contestant on Claire Hooper's House Of Games.

== Podcasting ==
Jayasinha started co-hosting a weekly podcast Fitbet, along with fellow comedian Ben Lomas, in February 2018. Episodes discuss various aspects of weight loss and mental health, interviewed guests are usually fellow comedians who discuss their own journey.

Jayasinha also recorded the podcast Dilruk's Mad Stacks, where he discusses his past as an accountant, the financial world, and money issues with Ed Kavalee.

== Awards ==
In 2018, he won the Logie Award for Most Popular New Talent.
