= Tom Gleeson =

Australian comedian (born 1974)

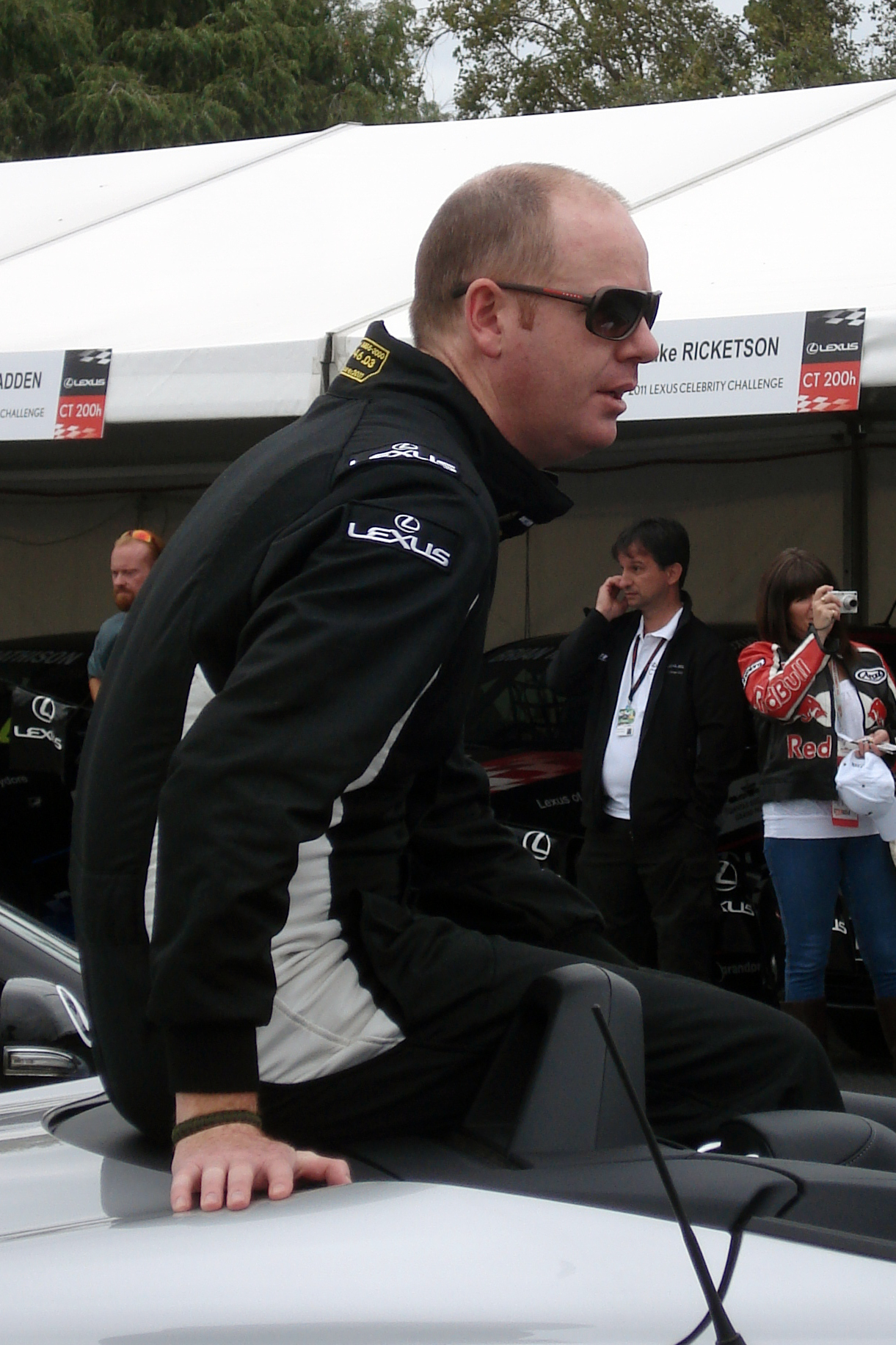
- Gleeson at the 2011 Australian Grand Prix
- Born: Thomas Francis Gleeson; 2 June 1974 (age 52); Gunnedah, New South Wales, Australia
- Education: University of Sydney (B.S.)
- Occupations: Comedian; writer; television presenter; radio presenter
- Years active: 1996–present
- Spouse: Ellie Parker
- Children: 2

Thomas Francis Gleeson (born 2 June 1974) is an Australian stand-up comedian, writer, television and radio presenter. Gleeson currently hosts Hard Quiz, Hard Quiz Kids and Taskmaster Australia and previously co-hosted The Weekly with Charlie Pickering alongside Judith Lucy.

In 2019, Gleeson won the Gold Logie Award for Most Popular Personality on Television.

== Early life ==
Gleeson was born in Gunnedah, New South Wales, and lived at nearby Tambar Springs before boarding at St. Joseph's College, Hunters Hill, in Sydney. He graduated from the University of Sydney with a Bachelor of Science in mathematics and physics. During his degree, Gleeson played the drums and occasionally sang vocals in an Australian band, The Fantastic Leslie, before leaving for a career in comedy.

== Career ==
=== Comedy ===
Gleeson's first stage appearance was as the character "Malcolm" (for two years) dressed in a flannelette shirt, tracksuit pants and a wig. He later went on to perform at major comedy events including the Melbourne International Comedy Festival, Sydney Comedy Festival, Adelaide Fringe, Brisbane Comedy Festival, Perth Fringe World, Edinburgh Fringe and Montreal Comedy Festival.

In December 2007, Gleeson entertained Australian troops on active duty in Iraq and Afghanistan. He wrote of this experience in his book Playing Poker with the SAS: A comedy tour of Iraq and Afghanistan, which was published in October 2008.

Three of Gleeson's stand-up shows have been nominated for the Helpmann Award for Best Comedy Performer: Tom On! (2007), Up Himself (2011) and Quality (2014).

Gleeson’s stand up show Joy (2019) won Best Comedy at Perth Fringe World.

Gleeson’s stand up show Lighten Up (2020) also won Best Comedy at the Adelaide Fringe.

=== Radio ===
From 2004 to 2005, Gleeson presented the Sydney and Melbourne evening radio program Tom & Subby with Subby Valentine on Triple M.

During 2009, Gleeson presented the Melbourne radio breakfast program Mix Mornings with Brigitte Duclos on Mix 101.1.

=== Television ===
In 2003 and 2004, Gleeson appeared in Network Ten's comedy sketch program skitHOUSE, playing various characters including the "Australian Fast Bowler", a superhero parodying Dennis Lillee. In 2006, Gleeson won Australia's Brainiest Radio Star. In 2008, he was a panelist on the short-lived Big Brother's Big Mouth. In 2009, Gleeson was in the "They don't get it in Australia" advertising campaign, where he asks people in the United States about Red Rooster. Gleeson also made several appearances on Good News Week between 2008 and 2011.

In 2013, Gleeson co-hosted Australian comedy chat show This Week Live with Tommy Little, Dave Thornton and Meshel Laurie. In 2015, Gleeson appeared on the ABC satirical television news program The Weekly with Charlie Pickering, hosting the segments "This Is What You Think", "Go Away" and "Hard Chat". In 2016, he began presenting Hard Quiz, a spin-off of his "Hard Chat" segment from The Weekly. It has been speculated that one of Gleeson's interviews in 2017 led to Sophie Monk getting the lead in The Bachelorette Australia. Gleeson is the main host of the Australian version of Taskmaster, working alongside his assistant, comedian Tom Cashman. In 2022 he performed in a celebrity tribute to Australian comedian and actor Paul Hogan, Roast of Paul Hogan, which was broadcast on Australia's Seven Network.

== Awards and nominations ==
=== ARIA Music Awards ===
The ARIA Music Awards are a set of annual ceremonies presented by Australian Recording Industry Association (ARIA), which recognise excellence, innovation, and achievement across all genres of the music of Australia. They commenced in 1987.

Year	Nominee / work	Award	Result	Ref.
2020	Joy	Best Comedy Release	Nominated	

=== Logie Awards ===
Year	Nominee / work	Award	Result	Ref.
2019	Tom Gleeson	Gold Logie	Won	
2022	Tom Gleeson	Gold Logie	Nominated	
