= Dave Hughes =

Australian comedian and presenter

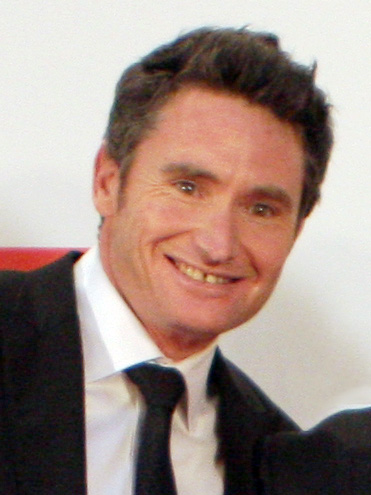
- Hughes in 2011
- Born: David Hughes; 26 November 1970 (age 55)
- Other name: Hughesy
- Occupations: Comedian, television and radio presenter
- Years active: 1992−present
- Spouse: Holly Ife (m. 2006)
- Children: 3
- Website: Official website

David "Hughesy" Hughes (born 26 November 1970) is an Australian stand-up comedian, and television and radio presenter. He is known for his larrikin personality, drawling Australian accent, and deadpan comedic delivery.

Hughes was co-host of the popular Hughesy & Kate on Nova 100 throughout the 2000s, later KIIS Network and Hit Network and Hughesy, Ed & Erin with Ed Kavalee and Erin Molan on 2Day FM. He was associated with Network 10 for nearly 20 years, including a decade as a panellist on Before the Game; annual comedy show specials; Rove; original co-host of The 7pm Project for five years (2009–2013); Hughesy, We Have A Problem; and The Masked Singer Australia.

== Early life and education ==
Dave Hughes was born on born 26 November 1970.

He graduated from the all-boys Christian Brothers' College, Warrnambool, in 1988, where he was dux of the school.

He briefly studied information technology at Swinburne University in Melbourne, and then accounting at Deakin University in Warrnambool, before dropping out to eventually pursue a career in comedy.

== Career ==
=== Comedy ===
After leaving university, it was seven years before Hughes found work as a stand-up comedian, and he did a variety of jobs, including working at an abattoir, as a bricklayer's labourer and a shop assistant.

After dreaming about being a comedian since he was a youngster, his first comedy gig came at age 22 when he was living in Perth doing labouring jobs and he decided, "I'm going to have a crack". After three attempts over six months he went on to become a headline act.

He became a regular performer at the Melbourne International Comedy Festival. Some of his shows have been released on CD (Dave Hughes: Whatever), and on DVD (Dave Hughes, Live, Dave Hughes – Handy and David Hughes – Pointless).

=== Television ===
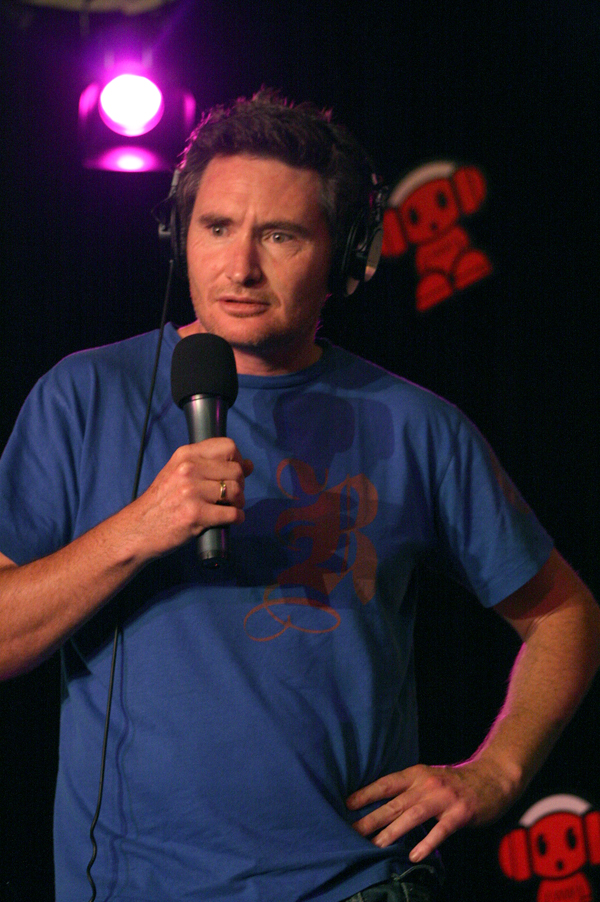
Hughes in 2009

Hughes had his first break on mainstream television when he was asked to do stand-up on Hey Hey It's Saturday, a show Hughes revered growing up. Hughes recalled in a 2021 50-year anniversary Hey Hey special that he had not been more nervous before or since that set.

Hughes co-hosted the ABC comedy talk show The Glass House along with Wil Anderson and Corinne Grant. However, it was axed in 2006 amid political controversy.

He has had guest spots on television programs The Fat, Rove Live, The Panel, Thank God You're Here, Talkin' 'Bout Your Generation, The Project, Studio 10, All Star Family Feud, Under Melbourne Tonight, Spicks & Specks, The Living Room, Celebrity Name Game, Would I Lie to You? Australia, and Have You Been Paying Attention?.

For ten years (2003–2013), Hughes was a co-host of the Australian Football League–themed Network Ten Saturday night show Before The Game alongside Mick Molloy, Anthony Lehmann, Andy Maher, and Neroli Meadows.

Hughes worked on Australian television variety show Rove in 2007, including featuring on dedicated weekly "Hughesy Loses It" segment. In 2008–09, the segment evolved into a recurring segment known as "Help me Hughesy", where he would rant about a given topic.

On 20 July 2009, Hughes began co-hosting the half-hour Channel 10 show The 7PM Project, which later expanded to become the hour-long The Project. His regular co-hosts were Charlie Pickering and Carrie Bickmore. In June 2011, Hughes was one of the few people to be granted a one-on-one interview with the Dalai Lama during his visit to Australia.

In December 2013, Hughes resigned from his full-time position on The Project to return to stand-up comedy. Hughes would, however, appear once a week on the show from wherever he was around the country. Hughes later stated that his reason for leaving The Project: "... to sit there every night and talk about the same things, it's just too much. I'm a comedian, so yeah, that's really why".

Hughes began a year-long round of stand-up engagements around Australia, in Adelaide in February 2014, where he and his family were based for five weeks before moving onto other venues.

In October 2014 Hughes guest-starred in an episode of ABC-TV's Julia Zemiro's Home Delivery, in which Zemiro accompanied Hughes back to his home-town of Warrnambool to reminisce about his childhood and to explore what influenced him to embark on a career in comedy.

Hughes was the new solo host of Australia's Got Talent in 2016.

Hughes returned to Network Ten in 2018 to host a new panel show, Hughesy, We Have a Problem. From 2019 to 2023, he was a panellist on The Masked Singer Australia for its full run.

In 2025, Hughes appeared as a contestant on the eleventh season of I'm a Celebrity...Get Me Out of Here!. He was the sixth contestant to be eliminated.

Hughes was on Season 4 of Taskmaster Australia, which aired 27 March to 29 May 2025, alongside Lisa McCune, Tommy Little, Emma Holland and Takashi Wakasugi.

Later that year, Network 10 announced that Hughes would appear as a team captain on the forthcoming revival of the game panel show Talkin' 'Bout Your Generation.

=== Radio ===
==== Nova 100 ====
In December 2001, Hughes joined comedians Kate Langbroek and Dave O'Neil to co-host a weekday breakfast program Hughesy, Kate & Dave from 6am to 9am on Melbourne's Nova 100. He has also worked for the Triple M network of Australian active rock radio stations.

==== KIIS Network ====
In November 2014, Australian Radio Network announced the show would relaunch on its KIIS Network of stations in Sydney, Melbourne, Brisbane and Adelaide in the drivetime slot, replacing Rosso on Drive on KIIS 106.5 and Mix 101.1, and local announcers on 97.3 FM and Mix 102.3. The show commenced on 27 January 2015, anchored by former 90.9 Sea FM and 2Day FM announcer Matty Acton. The show was pulled from the KIIS Network on 24 November 2016, a week prior to their final show.

==== Hit Network ====
In September 2017, Southern Cross Austereo announced that Hughes and Kate Langbroek would join the Hit Network in 2018 to replace Hamish and Andy.

In January 2019, Kate Langbroek and her family moved to Bologna, Italy and Langbroek continued to host the show until June. In August 2019, it was announced that she would file reports for the show for the remainder of the year. Ed Kavalee filled in as co-host until December.

In December 2019, Langbroek resigned from the show and Kavalee was announced as her replacement, and the show was renamed Hughesy & Ed. In November 2020, Southern Cross Austereo announced that Hughes, Kavalee, and Erin Molan would replace Jamie Angel to host The 2Day FM Morning Crew with Hughesy, Ed and Erin Molan from 18 January 2021.

In August 2024, Southern Cross Austereo announced that Hughesy, Ed & Erin had been axed, with 2Day FM taking a new direction. The last show aired on Wednesday 7 August. Jimmy & Nath hosted breakfast for the remainder of the year.

=== Advertising ===
In 2005, Hughes appeared in a series of television commercials for the Australian car manufacturer Holden.

In 2009, Hughes appeared in a three embedded advertising Zoot Review shorts promoting the return of Samboy chips, in which he reveals his favourite flavour is Atomic Tomato and shows off his signature "conga line" chip-eating technique.

=== Acting ===
Early in his career, Hughes had a brief appearance in an episode of Neighbours in 1998.

Hughes has also appeared in Ed Kavalee's comedy films Scumbus, which aired on Network 10 in 2012, and the yet-to-screen Border Protection Squad.

== Discography ==
=== Albums ===
List of albums, with Australian chart positions
| Title | Album details | Peak chart positions |
| Title | Album details | AUS |
|---|---|---|
| Whatever | Released: November 2002; Format: CD; Label: Liberation Music (LIBCD4056-2) | 86 |

== Awards and nominations ==
=== ARIA Music Awards ===
The ARIA Music Awards is an annual awards ceremony that recognises excellence, innovation, and achievement across all genres of Australian music.

| Year | Nominee / work | Award | Result | Ref. |
|---|---|---|---|---|
| 2003 | Whatever | Best Comedy Release | Nominated | |
| 2007 | Live | Best Comedy Release | Won | |
| 2009 | Dave Hughes Is Handy | Best Comedy Release | Nominated | |

== Personal life ==
He met Holly Ife, a reporter with the Herald Sun, in 2002, and they married on 31 December 2006. They have three children together.

In 2017, Hughes purchased one of the houses from the reality television series The Block for over A$3 million. He has a property portfolio estimated in 2026 to be worth about $10 million. As of April 2025 he lives in the Melbourne suburb of St Kilda.

Hughes has haemochromatosis. He gave up drinking alcohol when he was 22 after deciding that it had become a bad influence in his life. Hughes is a vegan. He was hospitalised in August 2025 with five broken ribs and a punctured lung after the AFL Legends Game.

Hughes was formerly described as a lifelong Labor voter. In May 2026, Hughes began posting videos on social media criticising the Albanese government and Victorian government. He is supporting Liberal leader Jess Wilson during the 2026 Victorian state election.

He is a keen supporter of the Carlton football team in the AFL.

== Controversy ==
During the 2007 Logie Awards, which he co-hosted with Adam Hills and Fifi Box, Hughes referred to radio shock jock Kyle Sandilands as a "massive dickhead" to applause and laughter from the audience. Later that year, when interviewed on Enough Rope with Andrew Denton, Sandilands said of Hughes, "I hate him – the next time I see him I'm going to punch him in the throat." Hughes retorted by releasing an official apology, which said in part that Hughes was "sincerely and deeply sorry that Kyle Sandilands is a massive dickhead" and that "massive dickheads have the same rights as normal people."
