= Becky Lucas =

Australian comedian, writer, and presenter

- Born: 1988; Brisbane, Queensland
- Education: Brisbane State High School
- Years active: 2013–present
- Children: 1

Becky Lucas (born 1988) is an Australian stand-up comedian, writer, and presenter. She has also appeared in various television series.

== Early life ==
Lucas was born in Brisbane and grew up on Coochiemudlo Island.

Her mother is a country music singer and her father is an inventor. They separated when Lucas was two years old.

== Career ==
Lucas was a finalist in the 2013 Raw Comedy competition. In 2014, she relocated to Sydney. Lucas has since performed solo stand-up shows at the Sydney Opera House and the Melbourne International Comedy Festival Gala.

On Australian television, Lucas hosted an ABC2 documentary about domestic violence in Australia entitled Big Bad Love in 2016. She starred in the sketch comedy series Orange Is the New Brown and At Home Alone Together. Lucas has also made appearances on Fancy Boy, Hughesy, We Have a Problem, Saturday Night Rove, Guy Montgomery's Guy Mont-Spelling Bee and Sam Pang Tonight.

Lucas has written for ABC comedy series Please Like Me and Squinters. She also co-wrote the sitcom The Other Guy alongside its star Matt Okine.

In 2018, Lucas posted a joke on Twitter about beheading Prime Minister Scott Morrison. It resulted in her Twitter account being banned.

In 2019, Lucas opened for Conan O'Brien in Sydney, and performed stand-up on his US late-night show Conan. O'Brien, who Lucas regards as an idol, allegedly told her "you need medication" after their Sydney performance.
