= Meshel Laurie =

Australian podcaster and author

- Born: Michelle Laurie; 29 May 1973 (age 53); Toowoomba, Queensland, Australia
- Notable work: The Project
- Children: 2

Comedy career
- Years active: 1998–present
- Medium: Podcaster; author
- Website: www.meshellaurie.com

Meshel Laurie (born Michelle Laurie 29 May 1973) is an Australian podcaster and author.

== Comedy career ==
Laurie's first Melbourne International Comedy Festival show was Dairy Belles which she performed with Corinne Grant. In 1998, she was granted the Brian McCarthy Memorial Moosehead Award to produce The Virgin Mary 2 - This Time It's Personal. Her success began to skyrocket when, in 2000, she debuted The Whore Whisperer: Confessions of a Madam at the Melbourne Fringe Festival - a show all about her experiences working in brothels. A sell-out in its first season, The Whore Whisperer went on to sell out seasons at the Adelaide Fringe, Melbourne International Comedy Festival, the Edinburgh Fringe and the Sydney Opera House.

== Broadcasting career ==
In 2000, Laurie co-hosted Enough Rope on 3RRR with Josh Kinal. This was a weekly programme about comedy that included the comedy tracks, a look at the comedy industry and interviews with numerous guests including: Wil Anderson, Daniel Kitson, Simon Munnery, Rachel Berger. Regular segments featured Adam Richard and Toby Sullivan. The show was controversially cancelled at the end of 2002.

In 2004, Laurie hosted Stand Up!, a comedy show on ABC TV. She was also a regular on national variety show Rove Live. Laurie has also appeared on The Glass House, Spicks and Specks, Good News Week, ADbc, The Circle, Studio 10, The Project and Hughesy, We Have a Problem.

In 2005, Laurie joined Nova 106.9 in Brisbane as a founding breakfast presenter on Meshel, Ash, Kip and Luttsy - it became the highest rating breakfast show in Brisbane. Over the years, Ash, Kip and Luttsy resigned with other presenters joining Laurie, including Tim Blackwell and Marty Sheargold. Meshel, Tim and Marty remained on breakfast until August 2011, when the show was moved to Melbourne to broadcast live nationally on Drive on Nova FM.

In 2013, Laurie co-hosted This Week Live, alongside Dave Thornton, Tommy Little and Tom Gleeson.

In October 2013, Nova 100 announced that she would join Tommy Little to host Meshel & Tommy replacing Hughesy & Kate. The show started in December 2013. In January 2014, Laurie was replaced by Kate Ritchie on the drive, joining Tim Blackwell and Marty Sheargold. In October 2015, Meshel announced that she would be leaving Nova 100 at the end of the year to host Matt & Meshel on KIIS 101.1 with Matt Tilley. She also hosted the 3PM Pick-Up with Katie 'Monty' Dimond on the KIIS Network. In October 2017 Australian Radio Network announced that Matt & Meshel would not be renewed in 2018.

In 2015, Laurie began an interview podcast called Nitty Gritty Committee. In November 2016, in conjunction with author and journalist Emily Webb, she began producing and hosting Australian True Crime Podcast. In September 2018, she travelled to South Sudan for a season 4 episode of SBS's Go Back To Where You Came From.

In January 2021, Laurie returned to radio hosting Breakfast with Adam Straney and Damien Leith on Wave FM in Wollongong whilst Jade Tonta was on maternity leave. A book, CSI Told You Lies: Giving Victims a Voice Through Forensics, was published by Laurie in August 2021.

== Personal life ==
Laurie was born in Toowoomba, Queensland, and moved to Melbourne early in her career as a stand-up comic to take advantage of its strong comedy industry/community.

Laurie is a Buddhist.

In June 2009, Laurie announced via Twitter that she was pregnant with twins, due in the summer. On 23 November 2009, Laurie announced the birth of her twins – a boy, Louis, and a girl, Dali – born on 20 November 2009.

In 2010, Laurie launched a blog to help promote charity and the ways that people can give back to communities all around the world.

Her book, Buddhism for Breakups, was published in 2017 by Blank Inc.
