= This Week Live =

- Genre: Talk show
- Created by: Craig Campbell; Kevin Whyte
- Presented by: Dave Thornton; Tommy Little; Tom Gleeson; Meshel Laurie
- Country of origin: Australia
- Original language: English
- No. of seasons: 1
- No. of episodes: 13

Production
- Producers: Craig Campbell; Kevin Whyte
- Running time: 60 minutes
- Production company: Roving Enterprises

Original release
- Network: Network Ten
- Release: 24 July – 16 October 2013

This Week Live is an Australian comedy chat show screening weekly on Network Ten from 24 July 2013. It is hosted by comedians Dave Thornton, Tommy Little, Tom Gleeson and Meshel Laurie. The show features discussions of topical subjects, guests on the panel and pre-recorded interviews and skits. The show is created and produced by Craig Campbell, Kevin Whyte, Tom Whitty and Hayden Guppy.

Rove McManus, Charlie Pickering and Peter Helliar have been guest panelists.

== Segments ==
Regular segments include:

- "I Hate You, Now Change My Mind", where a controversial politician or person in the media is interviewed by Tom Gleeson
- "Twit Pics", where photos of twits from Twitter are shared
- "Regional News"
- "Sport Report"
