= Nova 100 =

Radio station in Melbourne, Australia

Nova 100 (3MEL)
- Melbourne, Victoria; Australia
- Frequency: 100.3 MHz

Programming
- Language: English
- Format: Top 40 (CHR)
- Affiliations: Nova

Ownership
- Owner: Nova Entertainment
- Sister stations: Smooth 91.5

History
- First air date: 3 December 2001
- Call sign meaning: 3 for Victoria plus Melbourne

Technical information
- ERP: 56 kW
- Transmitter coordinates: 37.834892°S 145.348713°E

Links
- Website: www.novafm.com.au/melbourne

Nova 100 (call sign 3MEL) is a commercial radio station in Melbourne, Victoria, Australia, broadcasting on 100.3 MHz. It is owned by Nova Entertainment.

== History ==
In 2001 DMG Radio purchased an FM licence from the Australian Broadcasting Authority for $70 million. Nova 100 commenced broadcasting at 07:00 on 3 December 2001, becoming the city's first new commercial radio station in Melbourne for 21 years. Breakfast presenter Kate Langbroek was the first voice heard on the station, with Missy Elliott's song "Get Ur Freak On" being the first song played on the new station.

Hughesy, Kate & Dave was the inaugural breakfast show on Nova 100, featuring Dave Hughes, Kate Langbroek and Dave O'Neil. Dave O'Neil later resigned and moved to Vega 91.5 in July 2006. Hughes and Langbroek remained with the station until November 2013.

The station is a major player in the Melbourne radio market, initially with its 'Sounds Different' format playing alternative, hip-hop, pop & dance music, with a strong lean toward new releases. In 2010, Nova announced that it would remove their policy of "never more than two ads in a row", increasing the number of commercials broadcast per hour from 12 to 21 during the peak times of breakfast and drive. Since 2010, the station has broadcast an Adult Contemporary format, in competition with the ARN Media owned KIIS 101.1.

In December 2013, Meshel Laurie and Tommy Little replaced Dave Hughes and Kate Langbroek with their new show Meshel & Tommy. In November 2015, Nova announced that Chrissie Swan, Sam Pang and Jonathan Brown will host breakfast in 2016 after Meshel Laurie and Tommy Little announced their resignation from the station. Chrissie, Sam & Browny commenced in January 2016, with Meshel currently hosts the breakfast show Matt & Meshel on KIIS 101.1 along with Matt Tilley.

In December 2016, Nova announced that it will network Greg Burns and Dan Cassin from Nova 96.9 as opposed to local announcers.

Despite having yet to achieve a #1 overall rating for the station in the GfK ratings, Nova 100 continues to hold the #1 position for the women in the 45–54 age demographic and has the #4 drive show with Kate, Tim & Marty around Australia.

In April 2019, Nova overhauled its daytime schedule announcing that Matt Tilley would join the station. Tilley remained with the station until November.

On 21 October 2022, it was announced that Chrissie, Sam & Browny would end after seven years with the final show being on 2 December. Ben Harvey, Liam Stapleton and Belle Jackson will host Ben, Liam & Belle from 5 December 2022.

In January 2023, Nova 100 re-located from studios at 678 Victoria Street, Richmond to 257 Clarendon Street, South Melbourne. Southern Cross Austereo's Fox FM and Triple M previously occupied the studios.

In February 2024, Nova Entertainment announced that Jase & Lauren would host Nova 100’s new Melbourne breakfast show, replacing Ben, Liam & Belle who will move to a national drive show across the Nova Network.

== Transmission ==
Nova 100 operates on the 100.3 MHz FM frequency from the TXA Observatory Road tower on Mount Dandenong. The transmitter is a Broadcast Electronics FM 10S with an FXi digital exciter. Its transmitter power is 9.5KW which gives a 56 kw ERP.

== Announcers ==
- Jase, Lauren & Clint, 5:30am–9:00am
- Mel Tracina, 9:00am–1:00pm
- The Joel Creasey Show, 1:00pm–2:00pm
- The Chrissie Swan Show, 2:00pm-4:00pm
- Fitzy & Wippa with Kate Ritchie, 4:00pm–6:00pm
- Novaboy’s Jamz, 7:00pm–8:00pm
- Nova 9s, 8:00pm–9:00pm
- The Maddy Rowe Show, 9:00pm–12:00am
- Nova Nation, 6:00pm–12:00am (Saturday) & 10:00pm-12:00am (Friday)
- Jase, Lauren & Clint around Australia, 6:00am–10:00am (Sunday)
- The Maddy Rowe Aus Music Show, 6:00pm–7:00pm (Sunday)
- Nova Nation With Dave Kelly, 8-9pm & 10-11:59pm (Saturday)
