= Hughesy & Kate =

Australian radio station drive show

- Other names: Hughesy, Kate & Dave
- Genre: Comedy
- Running time: 120 minutes (5:00 pm – 7:00 pm)
- Country of origin: Australia
- Language: English
- Home station: Fox FM (2018–2020); KIIS 101.1 (2015–2017); Nova 100 (2001–2013)
- Syndicates: Hit Network
- Starring: Dave Hughes; Kate Langbroek
- Announcer: Jack Laurence
- Executive producer: Sacha French
- Recording studio: South Melbourne, Victoria
- Original release: 3 December 2001 – December 2019 (except 2014)
- Audio format: Stereophonic sound
- Website: www.hit.com.au/shows/hughesy-ed

Hughesy & Kate was an Australian radio station drive show on the Hit Network. The show was hosted by Dave Hughes and Kate Langbroek with anchor Jack Laurence. In addition to the national radio drive show, an inflight version was also produced and available in audio podcast section of inflight entertainment on Qantas fleets.

== History ==
=== Nova 100 ===
Hughesy, Kate and Dave first began on 3 December 2001 on Nova 100 as the inaugural breakfast show for the newly launched radio station. Dave O'Neil was formerly a presenter of the show from its inception in December 2001, when it was known as Hughesy, Kate & Dave, but in July 2006 he moved to the breakfast show on Vega 91.5 (now smoothfm 91.5). Tim Blackwell replaced O'Neil although his name was not credited in the show's title.

In 2009, Ed Kavalee, formerly of The Wrong Way Home drive show with Akmal Saleh and Cal Wilson, replaced Tim Blackwell as silent anchor. In August, news presenter Carrie Bickmore announced that she was leaving Nova 100 to focus on her role at The 7PM Project and spend time with her son. Bickmore finished at Nova 100 on 25 September 2009 with Lauren Brain replacing her.

In December 2011, Ed Kavalee resigned to focus on TV and film work, along with Jeff Tyler. Ian Cohen replaced Tyler and Daniel Gawned was announced as Kavalee's replacement for the beginning of 2012. In July 2012, Gawned was replaced by Dan Anstey who was moved from Nova 100's sister station Nova 106.9 in Brisbane.

On 10 September 2013, Hughes and Langbroek announced that they would be leaving Nova 100 after 12 years with the final show on Friday 29 November. In October, it was announced that drive host Meshel Laurie and comedian Tommy Little would replace Hughes and Langbroek. The new breakfast show Meshel & Tommy started in early December.

Mick Molloy, Peter Helliar, Gretel Killeen, Livinia Nixon and Jane Hall all filled in for Kate Langbroek when she was away or on maternity leave.

=== KIIS Network ===
In November 2014, Australian Radio Network announced the show would relaunch on its KIIS Network of stations in Sydney, Melbourne, Brisbane and Adelaide in the drivetime slot, replacing Rosso on Drive on KIIS 106.5 and Mix 101.1, and local announcers on 97.3 FM and Mix 102.3. The show commenced on 27 January 2015, anchored by former 90.9 Sea FM and 2Day FM announcer Matty Acton.

Along with The Kyle & Jackie O Hour of Power, the show expanded to Perth via 96FM in June 2015, replacing Darren de Mello in the drive slot.

In December 2016, Matty Acton left the show to join HIT 105 in Brisbane. Jack Laurence (JK) replaced Acton as anchor of the show from 2017. The show was pulled from the KIIS Network on 24 November, a week prior to their final show. Hughes and Langbroek were unable to farewell listeners.

=== Hit Network ===
In September 2017, Southern Cross Austereo announced that Dave Hughes and Kate Langbroek would join the Hit Network in 2018 to replace Hamish and Andy.

In January 2019, Kate Langbroek and her family moved to Bologna, Italy and Langbroek continued to host the show until June. In August 2019, it was announced that Kate will file reports for the show for the remainder of the year. Ed Kavalee filled in as co-host until December.

In December 2019, Kate Langbroek resigned from the show confirming that she will extend her time in Italy. Ed Kavalee was announced as her replacement from January 2020 and the show was renamed Hughesy & Ed. It was also announced that the show will air from 5 pm until 7 pm.

In November 2020, Southern Cross Austereo announced that Dave Hughes, Ed Kavalee and Erin Molan would replace Jamie Angel to host The 2Day FM Morning Crew with Hughesy, Ed and Erin Molan from Monday, 18 January 2021. A one-hour highlights package will air nationally at 6 pm across the Hit Network.
