= Kate Langbroek =

Australian broadcaster

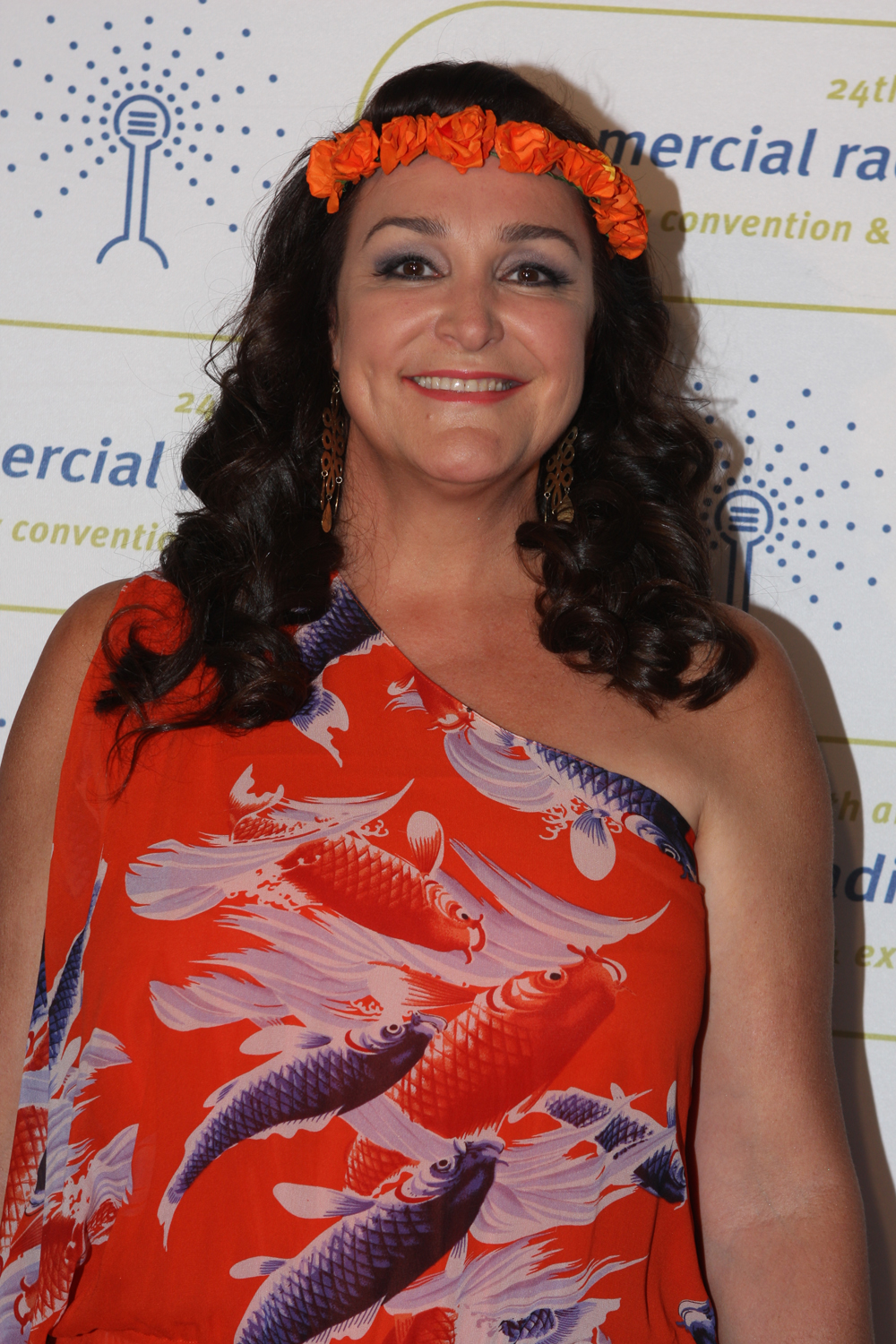
- Langbroek in 2012
- Born: Katherine Langbroek; Brisbane, Queensland
- Occupations: Television presenter; radio presenter; comedian
- Children: 4

Katherine Langbroek is an Australian comedian, radio and television presenter, and conservative commentator.

== Early life and education ==
Katherine Langbroek’s mother, Anne, is part Jamaican and American, and her father, Jan Langbroek, is Dutch. They both worked as missionaries in Papua New Guinea.

Kate was raised as a Jehovah's Witness and was bullied for her religion and appearance during her attendance at Salisbury High School (Queensland).

Langbroek has a degree in journalism.

== Career ==
Langbroek has appeared on The Panel, Thank God You're Here, The Project, All Star Family Feud, Have You Been Paying Attention?, and Hughesy, We Have a Problem.

From the start of 2018, Langbroek co-hosts Hughesy & Kate on the Australian HIT Network, with Dave Hughes and anchor Jack Laurence. It is an afternoon drive time program. The program was on the KIIS Network until the end of 2017. A previous segment of the program was 'Katie Cracks It' in which she talked about whatever has made her angry over the past few days. She was a radio announcer on the 3RRR programme Breakfasters. Langbroek previously worked as an actress (appearing in soap opera Chances and in a Transport Accident Commission Community Service Announcement); and as a script writer for Neighbours. Langbroek was a competitor in Dancing with the Stars in 2006. She was the sixth celebrity eliminated in Episode 8. She also competed in, and won, the weekly Thank God You're Here challenge on Network Ten on Wednesday, 18 July 2007.

Langbroek was a guest on, and won, the quiz show Out of the Question, for the episode airing on Thursday 28 February 2008. Her name was engraved on the "Out of the Question" trophy, alongside the likes of Ed Kavalee and Tony Moclair. Langbroek has also been a guest co-host on Network Ten's morning show The Circle. In November 2020, it was announced that Langbroek would replace Rebecca Judd as the co-host of the 3pm Pick-up in 2021. In October 2022, it was announced that Langbroek and her co-hosts Monty Dimond and Yumi Stynes would be leaving the show and the KIIS Network.

In November 2022, it was announced that Langbroek would be joining the Nine Network as the host of the brand new love and dating show titled My Mum Your Dad.

== Personal life ==
Langbroek married engineer and multimillionaire bar owner, Peter Allan Lewis in 2003, and is the mother of four children. She breast-fed live on The Panel shortly after the birth of her first son.

Her brother is John-Paul Langbroek, a Queensland state politician and former leader of the Liberal National Party.

On 8 August 2013, Langbroek revealed that in March 2013, her eldest child had received the "all clear" after a three-and-a-half-year battle with leukaemia. The family had chosen not to share on the radio his battle with cancer. In 2015, Langbroek was appointed ambassador of the Children's Cancer Foundation and shared her story at the Foundation's annual fundraiser, The Million Dollar Lunch.

In January 2019, Langbroek and her family relocated to Bologna, Italy, initially for one year.
