= Tommy Little (comedian) =

Australian comedian and actor

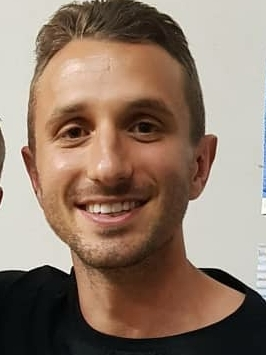
- Tommy Little at Sydney Comedy Store 2018
- Born: Thomas Little; 23 February 1985 (age 41)
- Occupations: Comedian; writer; actor; television presenter; radio presenter

Thomas Little (born 23 February 1985) is an Australian comedian, writer, actor, television and radio presenter. He currently co-hosts Carrie & Tommy on the Hit Network with Carrie Bickmore. He formerly was a co-host on The Project on Network 10.

== Career ==
In 2013, Little performed at the Melbourne International Comedy Festival and appeared at the festival's Gala show, which showcases five-minute sets of dozens of comedians. In early 2014, he returned to the Melbourne International Comedy Festival with a new show, "Ass Gangster", in 2019 with his show "Self Diagnosed Genius" and in 2021 with "I'll See Myself Out".

Little has also performed live on Foxtel.

=== Television ===
Little has appeared on Melbourne International Comedy Festival, Celebrity Name Game, Studio 10, The Project and Hughesy, We Have a Problem.

In 2008, Little began writing for Channel 31's talk show, Studio A, hosted by Dave Thornton and produced by RMITV. By 2010, he was promoted to host. After the sixth season of Studio A, RMITV management stated in a press release that they would be making changes to their Flagship Production in 2012 and announced that a new program, Live on Bowen, would be the show's successor.

In 2012, Little appeared at the Warehouse Comedy Festival, which converts an old warehouse into a pop-up comedy venue and films one-hour shows for viewing on the ABC.

In 2013, Little was announced as host of Network Ten's comedy and entertainment series, A League of Their Own and co-host of comedy chat show This Week Live alongside Dave Thornton, Tom Gleeson and Meshel Laurie. He also played Claudia Karvan's love interest on the ABC drama Time of our Lives.

Little was the comedic panelist on Ten's prime time entertainment news program The Project, filling the spot of regular Peter Helliar since 2014.

In 2016, Little hosted Whose Line Is It Anyway? Australia, an improvisational comedy show, based on the British show of the same name on Foxtel network's The Comedy Channel.

In 2020, following lockdowns in Melbourne, Little performed a show with a live audience at Melbourne International Comedy Festival titled 'Tommy Little: Self-Diagnosed Genius', which was distributed on Amazon.

In 2025, Little started performing in the TV show Taskmaster Australia.

Also in 2025, Little performed in the light entertainment show Talkin' 'Bout Your Gen as captain of Gen Y's team.

=== Radio ===
Little regularly filled in for Hughesy & Kate on Nova 100 whilst they were on holidays. In October 2013, Nova 100 announced that Little would join Meshel Laurie to host Meshel & Tommy early December 2013, replacing Hughesy & Kate. In October 2015, Little announced that he would be leaving Nova 100 at the end of the year.

In January 2017, Southern Cross Austereo announced that Little and Carrie Bickmore would host Carrie & Tommy across the Hit Network. The show airs weekdays from 3pm to 6pm.

== Charity ==
In December 2018, Little set out and completed the Antarctic Ice Marathon in an effort to raise money for Project Rectum. They raised over $114,000.
