= The Great Australian Bake Off season 10 =

Season of a television series

The Great Australian Bake Off
- Season 10
- Starring: Tom Walker; Natalie Tran; Darren Purchese; Rachel Khoo
- No. of episodes: 10

Release
- Original network: LifeStyle
- Original release: 11 August – 13 October 2026

Season chronology
- ← Previous; Season 9

The tenth season of the television competition series The Great Australian Bake Off premiered on 11 August 2026 on the LifeStyle channel. The season saw twelve home bakers take part in a bake-off to test their baking skills as they compete to be the series' best amateur baker. The season consisted of ten episodes, each of which sees bakers put through three challenges, with each episode having its own theme or discipline. The season is hosted by Natalie Tran and Tom Walker and is judged by Darren Purchese and Rachel Khoo.

== Contestants ==
The following is the list of the bakers that compete in this season:

Baker	Age	Occupation	Competition Status
Pamela Buchanan	41	Stay-at-home mum	Season Winner
Branden Khou	29	Financial client manager	Season Runner-Up
Matt Perillo-Phipps	44	Emergency nurse	Season Runner-Up
Negin Yaghmaie	30	MRI scientist	Eliminated (Episode 9)
Anita Birdi	54	Medical receptionist	Eliminated (Episode 8)
Glenn Jones	51	IT project manager	Eliminated (Episode 7)
Lucy Barnes	44	Bookkeeper	Eliminated (Episode 6)
Nick Cerchiara	30	Warehouse manager	Eliminated (Episode 5)
Sherrett Bone	42	Finance officer	Eliminated (Episode 4)
Jacob Amarant	33	Marketing lead	Eliminated (Episode 3)
Melanie Clements	62	Jewellery sales manager	Eliminated (Episode 2)
Peter Kennedy-Gane	60	Retired alpaca farmer	Eliminated (Episode 1)

== Results summary ==
Elimination Chart
Baker	1	2	3	4	5	6	7	8	9	10
Pamela	SB						SB			WINNER
Branden				SB						Runner-Up
Matt						SB			SB	Runner-Up
Negin			SB					SB	OUT	
Anita					SB			OUT		
Glenn							OUT			
Lucy						OUT				
Nick		SB			OUT					
Sherrett				OUT						
Jacob			OUT							
Melanie		OUT								
Peter	OUT									

Colour key:

Got through to the next round	Awarded Star Baker	Season winner
One of the judges' favourite bakers that week	The baker was eliminated
One of the judges' least favourite bakers that week	Season runner-up

== Episodes ==
The baker was eliminated	Awarded Star Baker	Season winner

=== Episode 1: Cake Week ===
Airdate: 11 August 2026

Baker	Signature (Sculptural Cake)	Technical (Ultimate Chocolate Cake)	Showstopper (Burn Away Cake)
Anita	Ambi Cake	11th	Family Tree
Branden	Map of Cambodia	2nd	House of Cards
Glenn	Sonny the Dog	6th	Boys Also Wanna Have Fun
Jacob	Vintage Tram	10th	In the Limelight
Lucy	Teacup Candle	7th	Outside the Box
Matt	Gingerbread Gym Bro	8th	Dojo Cake
Melanie	Snapper Cake	9th	Tree of Life
Negin	Bronze Bust	3rd	Serve It Like It's Hot
Nick	Little Piggy	5th	Burning Love
Pamela	Avo Party	1st	Art Deco Cake
Peter	Alpaca Cake	12th	Under the Sea
Sherrett	Sleepy Unicorn	4th	Rainbows and Unicorns

=== Episode 2: Bread Week ===
Airdate: 18 August 2026

Baker	Signature (Filled Baguettes)	Technical (Concha Bread)	Showstopper (Decorative Braided Loaves)
Anita	Lamb Keema French Baguette	6th	Forever Flower Braided Loaf
Branden	Brew-Guette	2nd	Ode to Love
Glenn	La Belle Vita Baguette	8th	Loaf in Bloom
Jacob	Francesinha Baguette	7th	Christmas Wreath
Lucy	Pig & Drizzle	9th	Baby Girls Nest
Matt	Ciccioli Di Maiale	11th	Nona's Sunflower Bread
Melanie	Frangipane Baguette	10th	Wheat and Flower Challah
Negin	Persian Breakfast Baguette	1st	Braided Light
Nick	Calabrian Crumb	5th	Spicy Octopus
Pamela	Golfeado Baguette	4th	Basket of Flowers
Sherrett	Baguettey "McOnion" Face	3rd	Harvest Halo

=== Episode 3: Biscuit Week ===
Airdate: 25 August 2026

Baker	Signature (Standing Cookies)	Technical (Caprese Sandwich Biscuits)	Showstopper (Floating Biscuit Boats)
Anita	Tulip Field	2nd	Zanzibar Spice Dhow
Branden	Sweet Station	8th	Jasmine Drifter
Glenn	Miss Penny	10th	Sweet and Spicy Bite
Jacob	Sunflower Garden	3rd	Sugar and Spice
Lucy	Murder She Baked	9th	Life Raft
Matt	Coffee's on Me	6th	Good Ship Lollipop
Negin	Rocking with Aunty G	5th	Dragon Express
Nick	Do You Even Lift?	4th	Whatever Floats Your Boat
Pamela	Giraffe Herd	7th	Venezuelan Dream Boat
Sherrett	Good Boi Biscuits	1st	Duck Duck Boat

=== Episode 4: Savoury Week ===
Airdate: 1 September 2026

Baker	Signature (Decorated Quiche)	Technical (Gougeres)	Showstopper (Sausage Roll Centrepiece)
Anita	Buzzy Bee Quiche	7th	Butter Chicken Sausage Rolls
Branden	Little Fish Quiche	1st	Bayon Temple
Glenn	Cherry Blossom Quiche	3rd	Taste of Thailand
Lucy	Under the Sea	5th	Sandcastle
Matt	Veggie Patch	2nd	Sausage Roll Robot
Negin	Fennel Blossom	9th	Ferris Wheel
Nick	Ode to the Forest	6th	Lemon Tree
Pamela	Lady Quiche	4th	Empanada Sausage Rolls
Sherett	Flinders Ranges	8th	Blossom Bites

=== Episode 5: Greek Week ===
Airdate: 8 September 2026

Baker	Signature (Loukoumades)	Technical (Tsoureki)	Showstopper (Mythology-Themed Filo)
Anita	Apple Crumble Loukoumades	1st	Apollo's Lyre
Branden	Golden Tea Loukoumades	2nd	The Light Within
Glenn	Loukouboureko	7th	Flying Pegasus
Lucy	Balls of Fire	6th	Icarus' Wings
Matt	Loukoumades Split	4th	Golden Ram
Negin	Pomegranate Loukoumades	5th	Atlas
Nick	Lamington-ades	3rd	Demeter's Harvest
Pamela	Limoncello Loukoumades	8th	Misunderstood Cyclops

=== Episode 6: Spring Week ===
Airdate: 15 September 2026

Baker	Signature (Cupcake Bouquets)	Technical (Raspberry Pavlova)	Showstopper (Tart Within a Tart)
Anita	Whisky-licious Bouquet	2nd	Triple Tart Keyhole
Branden	Eight Blooms, One Garden	1st	Yin and Yang
Glenn	Strawberry Blooms	6th	Eat Your Heart Out
Lucy	Golden Harvest Blooms	7th	Arty Tarty
Matt	Father's Day Breakfast Bouquet	5th	Starry Night
Negin	Happy Sunflower Bouquet	4th	Cupid's Arrow Tart
Pamela	Spring Bloom Bouquet	3rd	Spring Picnic Tart

=== Episode 7: Surprise Week ===
Airdate: 22 September 2026

Baker	Signature (Lamingtons)	Technical (Surprise Pie)	Showstopper (Remote-Controlled Vehicle Cake)
Anita	Savoury Lam-in-yums	2nd	Magic Carpet
Branden	Tropical Lamingtons	4th	Cartoon Car
Glenn	Luxe Lamingtons	6th	Punch Buggy
Matt	Lifesaving Lamingtons	5th	Ride or Die
Negin	Loved Up Lamingtons	3rd	Food Truck
Pamela	Cheesy Lamingtons	1st	"Just Married" Van

=== Episode 8: Great Outdoors Week ===
Airdate: 29 September 2026

Baker	Signature (Damper)	Technical (Spiral Curry Puffs)	Showstopper (Gourmet Picnic Basket)
Anita	Pepperberry Damper	3rd	Indian Themed Picnic
Branden	Damper Scrolls	1st	Taste of Two Worlds
Matt	Outbaack Devonshire Tea	4th	Kids' Party Picnic
Negin	Quandong Damper	2nd	Italian Style Picnic
Pamela	Davidson Plum Damper	5th	Favourite Things Picnic

=== Episode 9: History Week ===
Airdate: 6 October 2026

Baker	Signature (Linzer Torte)	Technical (Passionfruit Souffle)	Showstopper (Decorated Bundt)
Branden	Henny Berry Linzer Torte	1st	Harmony in Bloom
Matt	Nightingale's Lantern	2nd	Rainbow Fireworks
Negin	Peach & Honey Linzer Torte	3rd	Golden Pumpkin
Pamela	Lingonberry Torte	4th	Groovy 60s Bundt Cake

=== Episode 10: Final ===
Airdate: 13 October 2026

Baker	Signature (?)	Technical (?)	Showstopper (?)
Branden			
Matt			
Pamela			
