= The Great Australian Bake Off season 4 =

Season of a television series

The Great Australian Bake Off
- Season 4
- Starring: Claire Hooper; Mel Buttle; Maggie Beer; Matt Moran
- No. of episodes: 10

Release
- Original network: LifeStyle
- Original release: 18 January – 22 March 2018

Season chronology
- ← Previous; Season 3 Next → Season 5

The fourth season of The Great Australian Bake Off premiered on 18 January 2018, and saw 12 home bakers take part in a bake-off to test their baking skills as they battled to be crowned The Great Australian Bake Off's best amateur baker. Unlike the third season, season 4 moved from LifeStyle Food to the main LifeStyle channel. The season consisted of 10 episodes. Each episode saw bakers put through three challenges, with each episode having its own theme or discipline. The season aired from 18 January 2018 until 22 March 2018, and saw Claudia Anton win. The season was hosted by Claire Hooper and Mel Buttle, and was judged by Maggie Beer and Matt Moran.

== The Bakers ==
The following is the list of the bakers that competed this season:

Baker	Age	Occupation	Hometown	Competition Status
Claudia Anton	48	Psychiatrist	Melbourne, Victoria	Season Winner
Barbara "Barb" Dunn	37	Finance manager	Brisbane, Queensland	Season Runner-Up
Dave Yan	35	Chartered Accountant	Sydney, New South Wales	Season Runner-Up
Christopher "Chris" Asquith	32	System administrator	Newcastle, New South Wales	Eliminated (Episode 9)
Raeesa Khatree	37	Health store worker (former lawyer)	Brisbane, Queensland	Eliminated (Episode 8)
Robert Harwood	34	I.T. administrator	Perth, Western Australia	Eliminated (Episode 7)
Marcus Matear	27	Dentist	Melbourne, Victoria	Eliminated (Episode 6)
Michelle Trevorrow	64	Retiree	Melbourne, Victoria	Eliminated (Episode 5)
Emma Sievwright	23	Science graduate	Brisbane, Queensland	Eliminated (Episode 4)
Max Fetiveau	28	Plasterer	Brisbane, Queensland	Eliminated (Episode 3)
Alexander "Alex" Papadopoulos	47	Building material importer	Melbourne, Victoria	Eliminated (Episode 2)
Jessica Osborne	28	Sales co-ordinator	Brisbane, Queensland	Eliminated (Episode 1)

== Results summary ==
Elimination Chart
Baker	1	2	3	4	5	6	7	8	9	10
Claudia		SB		SB		SB				WINNER
Barb			SB					SB		Runner-Up
Dave									SB	Runner-Up
Chris					SB				OUT	
Raeesa							SB	OUT		
Robert	SB						OUT			
Marcus						OUT				
Michelle					OUT					
Emma				OUT						
Max			OUT							
Alex		OUT								
Jessica	OUT									

Colour key:

Got through to the next round	Awarded Star Baker	Season winner
One of the judges' favourite bakers that week	The baker was eliminated
One of the judges' least favourite bakers that week	Season runner-up

== Episodes ==
The baker was eliminated	Awarded Star Baker	Season winner

=== Episode 1: Cakes ===
Baker	Signature (Marble cake)	Technical (24 chocolate dipped hazelnut madeleines)	Showstopper (Ultimate children's party cake)
Claudia	Pink Marble Cake	8th	Pony Cake
Chris	Marble Cake	6th	Neapolitan Princess Cake
Barb	Marble Bundt Cake	5th	Unicorn Cake
Max	Marble Cake	11th	Monster Cake
Robert	Tiger Cake	3rd	Dolly Varden Cake
Raeesa	Peacock Cake	1st	Jungle Cake
Marcus	Marble Cake	12th	Volcano Cake
Jessica	Marble Cake	9th	Teapot Cake
Alex	Lemon and Pistachio Cake	10th	Mermaid Cake
Emma	Ode to Mischa	4th	Bear Cake
Michelle	Lemon and Raspberry Bundt Cake	2nd	Volcanic Cake
Dave	Green Cake	7th	Unicorn Cake

=== Episode 2: Bread ===
Baker	Signature (Focaccia)	Technical (12 identical pumpkin scones)	Showstopper (Pull apart bread centrepiece)
Claudia	Kitchenette Focaccia	2nd	Edelweiss Pull Apart
Chris	Garlic and Thyme Focaccia	9th	Apple Pie Pull Apart
Barb	Olive Oil Focaccia	8th	Pumpkin Pull Apart
Max	Olive Oil and Rosemary Focaccia	3rd	Tour de France Pull Apart
Robert	Rosemary Focaccia	1st	Cheesy Pull Apart
Raeesa	Eggplant and Caramelised Onion Focaccia	10th	Baklava Pull Apart
Marcus	Goat Cheese Focaccia	6th	French Onion Pull Apart
Alex	Spanish Focaccia	7th	Tsoureki
Emma	Spelt Focaccia	11th	Atomic Pull Apart
Michelle	Quattro Formaggi Focaccia	5th	Christmas Tree Pull Apart
Dave	Pine Nut and Grape Focaccia	4th	Enchanted Rose Pull Apart

=== Episode 3: Biscuits ===
Baker	Signature (32 signature biscotti)	Technical (24 jam drops)	Showstopper (Biscuit jigsaw puzzle)
Claudia	Scientific Biscotti	10th	Pieces of Sydney Puzzle
Chris	Manly Biscotti	3rd	Puzzled Grizzly
Barb	Biscotti	2nd	Sunflower Puzzle
Max	French Biscotti	4th	Eiffel Tower by Night Puzzle
Robert	Biscotti	9th	Jigsaw Sunflower
Raeesa	Biscotti	7th	Tree of Life Puzzle
Marcus	Roman Biscotti	8th	From Another Planet Puzzle
Emma	Swotty Biscotti	6th	Periodic Table Puzzle
Michelle	Biscotti	5th	Blooming Marvellous Puzzle
Dave	Biscotti	1st	Chinese Tangram Puzzle

=== Episode 4: Family Favourites ===
Baker	Signature (24 muffins)	Technical (Family-sized chicken, leek and mushroom pie)	Showstopper (Tiered pavlova)
Claudia	Muffins	3rd	Pina Pavlova
Chris	Family Favourite Muffins	8th	Rectangular Pavlova
Barb	Apple, Carrot and Raisin Muffins	5th	Black Forest Chocolate Pavlova
Robert	Lumberjack Muffins	6th	Pavlova
Raeesa	Muffins	2nd	Tropical Pavlova
Marcus	Apple and Plum Muffins with Apple Caramel Sauce	7th	Pavlova
Emma	Hummingbird Muffins	9th	Pineapple Pavlova
Michelle	Pumpkin, Sage and Goat Cheese Muffins	1st	Pavlova
Dave	Breakfast Muffins	4th	Sweet Rainbow Pavlova

=== Episode 5: Pastry ===
Baker	Signature (24 identical sausage rolls)	Technical (Fraisier cake)	Showstopper (36 Viennoiserie; three different types, but one type must be a puff pastry croissant)
Claudia	Sausage Rolls	1st	Orchard Viennoiseries (chocolate mandarin croissants, apple danishes and almond brioches)
Chris	Pork Sausage Rolls	5th	Yeast Free Viennoiseries (praline pain au chocolat, raspberry croissants and palmiers)
Barb	Kid Friendly Sausage Rolls	2nd	Viennoiseries (butter croissants, almond croissants and cream cheese danishes)
Robert	Sausage Rolls	3rd	Viennoiseries (orange and almond croissants, pain au chocolat and sfogliatelle)
Raeesa	Cheeky Chicken Sausage Rolls	6th	Viennoiseries (croissants, passionfruit danishes and cranberry danishes)
Marcus	Sausage Rolls	4th	Viennoiseries (butter croissants, cherry danishes and snails)
Michelle	Moroccan Sausage Rolls	8th	Viennoiseries (blackberry and lemon verbena brioche, croissants and fig danishes)
Dave	Pork Sausage Rolls	7th	Breakfast Basket Viennoiseries (chocolate croissants, sour cherry danishes and apricot pinwheels)

=== Episode 6: Batter ===
Baker	Signature (12 waffles)	Technical (Apple clafoutis)	Showstopper (Crepe cake)
Claudia	Chestnut and Hazelnut Waffles	6th	Black Forest Crepe Cake
Chris	Bacon and Cheddar Waffles	2nd	Red Velvet Crepe Cake
Barb	Corny Waffles	1st	Ombre Crepe Cake
Robert	Japanese Waffles	4th	Crepe Cake
Raeesa	Buttermilk Waffles	5th	Crepe Cake
Marcus	Totally Tropical Waffles	3rd	Crepe Cake
Dave	Mochi Waffles	7th	Ombre Crepe Cake

=== Episode 7: Desserts ===
Baker	Signature (6 identical dairy-free fruit tarts)	Technical (Gluten-free tiramisu)	Showstopper (Sugar-free trifle)
Claudia	Tropical Tarts	4th	Fruit Trifle
Chris	Zesty Lemon Tarts	1st	Black Forest Trifle
Barb	Decadent Chocolate and Raspberry Tarts	5th	Alcohol Free Christmas Trifle
Robert	Lime and Strawberry Tarts	3rd	Berry Trifle
Raeesa	Fig and Frangipane Tarts	2nd	Pineapple Trifle
Dave	Raspberry and Chocolate Tarts	6th	Rose Trifle

=== Episode 8: British ===
Baker	Signature (Filled sponge cake)	Technical (Bakewell slice)	Showstopper (British pudding)
Claudia	Sponge Cake	3rd	Queen of Puddings
Chris	Sponge Cake	2nd	Tower of Pudding
Barb	Tropical Sponge Cake	4th	Tower Bridge Pudding
Raeesa	Sponge Cake	5th	Bread and Butter Pudding
Dave	Royal Sponge Cake	1st	Queen of Puddings

=== Episode 9: Celebrations ===
Baker	Signature (24 hot cross buns)	Technical (24 mince pies)	Showstopper (Wedding cake)
Claudia	Boozy Bunnies	3rd	Feathered Love Birds
Chris	Hot Cross Buns	1st	Wedding Cake
Barb	Hot Cross Buns	2nd	Wedding Cake
Dave	Easter Goodies	4th	Floating Elegance Cake

=== Episode 10: Finale ===
Baker	Signature (Battenberg cake)	Technical (12 kumquat rum babas)	Showstopper (Pièce montée)
Claudia	Citrus Orchard Battenberg	2nd	Cockatoo
Barb	Citrus Battenberg	1st	Treasure Chest
Dave	Sunflower Battenberg	3rd	Oriental Garden

== Ratings ==
No.	Title	Air date	Overnight ratings		Ref(s)
No.	Title	Air date	Viewers	Rank	Ref(s)
1	"Cakes"	18 January 2018	103,000	1	
2	"Bread"	25 January 2018	94,000	1	
3	"Biscuits"	1 February 2018	103,000	1	
4	"Family Favourites"	8 February 2018	98,000	1	
5	"Pastry"	15 February 2018	75,000	2	
6	"Batter"	22 February 2018	89,000	1	
7	"Desserts"	1 March 2018	106,000	3	
8	"British"	8 March 2018	102,000	3	
9	"Celebrations"	15 March 2018	130,000	2	
10	"Finale"	22 March 2018	162,000	3	
