= The Great Australian Bake Off season 3 =

Season of a television series

The Great Australian Bake Off
- Season 3
- Starring: Claire Hooper; Mel Buttle; Maggie Beer; Matt Moran
- No. of episodes: 10

Release
- Original network: LifeStyle Food
- Original release: 11 October – 14 December 2016

Season chronology
- ← Previous; Season 2 Next → Season 4

The third season of The Great Australian Bake Off premiered on 11 October 2016 on the LifeStyle Food network, and saw 12 home bakers take part in a bake-off to test their baking skills as they battled to be crowned The Great Australian Bake Off's best amateur baker. The season consisted of 10 episodes. Each episode saw bakers put through three challenges, with each episode having its own theme or discipline. The season aired from 11 October 2016 until 14 December 2016, and saw Olivia McMahon win. The season was hosted by Claire Hooper and Mel Buttle, and was judged by Maggie Beer and Matt Moran.

== The Bakers ==
The following is the list of the bakers that competed this season:

Baker	Age	Occupation	Hometown	Competition Status
Olivia McMahon	37	Fine Dining Waitress	Brisbane, Queensland	Season Winner
Monica Cavallaro	43	Retail Manager	Sydney, New South Wales	Season Runner-Up
Antonio Marcora	16	School Student	Sydney, New South Wales	Season Runner-Up
Liesel Morgan	20	University Student	Perth, Western Australia	Eliminated (Episode 9)
Fiona Nguyen	32	Patent & Trademark Lawyer	Brisbane, Queensland	Eliminated (Episode 8)
James Rudd	26	IT Technical Support	Perth, Western Australia	Eliminated (Episode 7)
Noel Button	59	Retired Teacher	Launceston, Tasmania	Eliminated (Episode 6)
Jeremy Allan	30	Welding & Vessel Inspector	Adelaide, South Australia	Eliminated (Episode 5)
Bojan Petrovic	37	Tow Truck Business Owner	Canberra, Australian Capital Territory	Eliminated (Episode 4)
Diana Gyllen	29	Model	Sydney, New South Wales	Eliminated (Episode 3)
Cheryl Roberts	59	Horse Trainer	Berry, New South Wales	Eliminated (Episode 2)
Janette Betts	62	Palliative Care Nurse	Melbourne, Victoria	Eliminated (Episode 1)

== Results summary ==
Elimination Chart
Baker	1	2	3	4	5	6	7	8	9	10
Olivia			SB		SB				SB	WINNER
Monica	SB						SB			Runner-Up
Antonio				SB		SB				Runner-Up
Liesel		SB							OUT	
Fiona								OUT		
James							OUT			
Noel						OUT				
Jeremy					OUT					
Bojan				OUT						
Diana			OUT							
Cheryl		OUT								
Janette	OUT									

Colour key:

Got through to the next round	Awarded Star Baker	Season winner
One of the judges' favourite bakers that week	The baker was eliminated
One of the judges' least favourite bakers that week	Season runner-up

== Episodes ==
The baker was eliminated	Awarded Star Baker	Season winner

=== Episode 1: Cakes ===
Baker	Signature (Lamingtons)	Technical (Pear and Amaretto Cake)	Showstopper (Ombre Cake)
Fiona	Pandan Lamingtons	10th	Bel Air
Bojan	Lime Lamingtons	12th	Forever Blue
Olivia	Red Skin Lollipops and Raspberry Jelly Lamingtons	8th	Lemon Delight
Jeremy	Chocolate Cherry Lamingtons	1st	Piña Colada
Liesel	Ginger and Honey Lamingtons	4th	Fairy
Diana	Mocha Cherry Lamingtons	9th	Citrus
James	Green Tea Lamingtons	3rd	Haut et Bas Gateaux
Antonio	Chocolate Cherry Lamingtons	11th	Floral and Isomalt
Monica	Tiramisu Lamingtons	7th	Berry
Noel	Chocolate and Citrus Lamingtons	2nd	Shades of Autumn
Cheryl	Marmalade Lamingtons	6th	Nectar of the Gods
Janette	Chocolate Lamingtons	5th	Rose

=== Episode 2: Biscuits ===
Baker	Signature (Savoury Biscuits)	Technical (16 Florentine biscuits)	Showstopper (Biscuit Landmarks)
James	Parmesan and Chive Biscuits	2nd	Perth Bell Tower
Olivia	Oats, Poppy Seed and Black Salt Biscuits	3rd	Gingerbread Arc de Triomphe
Monica	Savoury Macarons	8th	World Landmarks
Cheryl	Blue Cheese, Garlic & Chive Biscuits	10th	St. Basil's Cathedral
Noel	Savoury Shortbread	9th	Mum's Christmas in Paris
Bojan	Mediterranean Shortbread	7th	Spicy Sphinx
Fiona	Chilli, Fennel, Thyme and Cheese Biscuits	6th	Pyramids of Giza
Jeremy	Pizza Biscuits	11th	Indian Spiced Taj Mahal
Antonio	Savoury Biscotti	1st	Big Ben
Diana	Bacon and Fennel Crackers	4th	Eiffel Tower
Liesel	Pumpkin Seed Oatcakes	5th	Taj Mahal of Tea

=== Episode 3: Pies & Tarts ===
Baker	Signature (Quiche)	Technical (4 Pistachio Frangipane Tarts with Roasted Rhubarb and Raspberries)	Showstopper (Three Tiered Pies)
Olivia	Bacon and Asparagus Quiche	4th	Three Tiered Pork Pies
Monica	Three Mushrooms Quiche	6th	Three Course Meal
Noel	Smoked Salmon Quiche	9th	Three Tiered Frangipane Pies
Antonio	Pea and Asparagus Quiche	7th	Sweet Cheese Pies
Liesel	Asparagus, Capsicum and Broccollini Quiche	2nd	Apple Pie
Diana	Beef Taco Quiche	8th	Princess Pies
Fiona	Zucchini and Feta Quiche	5th	Winter Fruit Pies
James	Herbs, Tomato and Pumpkin Quiche	3rd	Ploughman's Lunch
Jeremy	Curried Egg Quiche	10th	'Apple Tree' Tiered Pies
Bojan	Chorizo, Spanish Tomatoes and Onions Quiche	1st	Caramelised Onion Pie

=== Episode 4: Chocolate ===
Baker	Signature (Chocolate Slice)	Technical (French Chocolate Dacquoise)	Showstopper (36 Miniature Chocolate Cakes)
Jeremy	Tower Slice	1st	Chocolate and Raspberry Cakes
Noel	Hazelnut and Ginger Slice	6th	Naked Chocolate Cakes
Antonio	Passionfruit Caramel and Coconut Slice	3rd	Chocolate, Raspberry and Macadamia Cakes
Olivia	Cheesecake Brownies	7th	Chocolate and Hazelnut Layered Cakes
Monica	S'mores Slice	2nd	Chocolate and Espresso Cakes
Fiona	S'more Chocolate Slice	5th	Chocolate and Passionfruit Cakes
Bojan	Choc Orange Slice	9th	Chocolate Passion Squares
James	Chocolate Orange Slice	4th	Chocolate and Hazelnut Sponge Cakes
Liesel	Zserbó Slice	8th	Chocolate and Mandarin Cakes

=== Episode 5: Bread ===
Baker	Signature (6 Burger Buns)	Technical (Fig, Walnut and Fennel Seed Baguettes	Showstopper (6 Sweet and 6 Savoury Bagels)
Fiona	Salmon Burgers	6th	Matcha Tea and Red Bean Bagels; Nori Bagels
Noel	Spelt Bun Burgers	8th	Cinnamon, Orange and Fig Bagels; Onion and Thyme Bagels
Monica	Milk Bun Burgers	3rd	Strawberry Bagels; French Onion Bagels
Jeremy	Brioche Burgers	7th	Craisin and Raspberry Bagels; Spinach, Feta and Pistachio Bagels
Antonio	Classic Brioche Burgers	1st	Rum and Raisin Bagels; Beetroot Bagels
Olivia	Aussie Burgers	2nd	French Toast Bagels; Garlic Bagels
Liesel	German Burgers	4th	Spiced Orange and Sultana Bagels; Beetroot and Thyme Bagels
James	Japanese Burgers	5th	Blueberry Bagels; Onion, Garlic and Fennel Bagels

=== Episode 6: Retro ===
Baker	Signature (Swiss Roll)	Technical (12 Neenish Tarts)	Showstopper (Bombe Alaska)
Olivia	Sticky Date Swiss Roll	7th	Volcanic Bombe Alaska
Liesel	Lemon Thyme Swiss Roll	1st	Bombe-bay Alaska
Monica	Chai, Apple Jam and Ginger Cream Swiss Roll	3rd	Pumpkin Bombe Alaska
Antonio	Banana and Dark Chocolate Swiss Roll	2nd	Tiramisu Bombe Alaska
James	Apricot Jam and White Chocolate Cream Swiss Roll	6th	Cherry Bombe Alaska
Fiona	Yuzu and Ginger Swiss Roll	5th	Watermelon Bombe Alaska
Noel	Traditional Swiss Roll	4th	Traditional Bombe Alaska

=== Episode 7: Pastry ===
Baker	Signature (6 Savoury and 6 Sweet Danishes)	Technical (2 Lamb Wellingtons)	Showstopper (Choux pastry Animal Sculpture)
Antonio	Blue Cheese and Fig Pockets; Lime Palmiers	2nd	Exotic Fish
Olivia	Persimmon Pillows; Goat's Cheese Twists	3rd	Underwater Turtle
James	Capsicum and Feta Danishes; Jam and Custards Danishes	5th	Koala Bear
Monica	Asparagus and Pancetta Danishes; Cinnamon and Raisin Snails	4th	Hoot Hoot Owl
Liesel	Sweet Potato Danishes; Rhubarb and Custard Danishes	1st	Englebert the Echidna
Fiona	Fig and Goat's Cheese Danishes; Pistachio and Rhubarb Danishes	6th	Chinese Zodiac Animals

=== Episode 8: Sweet Dough ===
Baker	Signature (24 Iced Finger Buns)	Technical (12 Bienenstiches)	Showstopper (Babka)
Olivia	Blueberry Finger Buns	1st	Spicy Babka
Fiona	Vietnamese Coffee Finger Buns	4th	East Meets West Babka
Antonio	Vanilla and Coffee Finger Buns	2nd	Panettone Babka
Monica	Citrulicious Finger Buns	5th	Babka-Rama
Liesel	Passionfruit Finger Buns	3rd	Free-form Babka

=== Episode 9: International ===
Baker	Signature (Cheesecake)	Technical (Porcini, Lemon Thyme and Three Cheese soufflé)	Showstopper ("Around the World" Cake)
Antonio	Ricotta Cheesecake	4th	Gateau Saint Honore
Olivia	Black Forest Cheesecake	2nd	Schichttorte
Monica	Neapolitan Cheesecake	1st	Pomme Charlotte
Liesel	German Cheesecake	3rd	Schichttorte

=== Episode 10: Finale ===
Baker	Signature (Opera cake)	Technical (Candied Orange and Ricotta Sfogliatelles)	Showstopper (Dessert Masterpiece)
Antonio	Fruit Opera Cake	1st	Brownie Masterpiece
Olivia	Passionfruit Opera Cake	3rd	Tropical Masterpiece
Monica	Classic Opera Cake	2nd	"Ode to Italy" Masterpiece

== Ratings ==
No.	Title	Air date	Overnight ratings		Ref(s)
No.	Title	Air date	Viewers	Rank	Ref(s)
1	"Cakes"	11 October 2016	96,000	3	
2	"Biscuits"	18 October 2016	104,000	1	
3	"Pies & Tarts"	25 October 2016	73,000	2	
4	"Chocolate"	2 November 2016	97,000	1	
5	"Bread"	8 November 2016	68,000	2	
6	"Retro"	15 November 2016	107,000	1	
7	"Pastry"	22 November 2016	116,000	2	
8	"Sweet Dough"	29 November 2016	131,000	1	
9	"International"	6 December 2016	146,000	1	
10	"Finale"	13 December 2016	140,000	1	
