= The Great Australian Bake Off season 2 =

Season of a television series

The Great Australian Bake Off
- Season 2
- Starring: Claire Hooper; Mel Buttle; Maggie Beer; Matt Moran
- No. of episodes: 10

Release
- Original network: LifeStyle Food
- Original release: 13 October – 15 December 2015

Season chronology
- ← Previous; Season 1 Next → Season 3

The second season of The Great Australian Bake Off premiered on 13 October 2015 and saw 12 home bakers take part in a bake-off to test their baking skills as they battled to be crowned The Great Australian Bake Off's best amateur baker. Unlike the first season, season two aired on pay television channel LifeStyle Food and was produced by FremantleMedia Australia. The season consisted of 10 episodes. Each episode saw bakers put through three challenges, with each episode having its own theme or discipline. The season aired from 13 October 2015 until 15 December 2015, and saw Sian Redgrave win. The season was hosted by Claire Hooper and Mel Buttle, and was judged by Maggie Beer and Matt Moran. The season consisted of 10 episodes.

In a slight change to the first season and the British edition of the show, this season took place in the Bake-Off Shed as opposed to a tent or marquee.

== The Bakers ==
The following is the list of the bakers that competed this season:

Baker	Age	Occupation	Hometown	Competition Status
Sian Redgrave	23	Fashion boutique stylist	Perth, Western Australia	Season Winner
Jasmin Hartley	27	Barista	Mackay, Queensland	Season Runner-Up
Suzy Stefanidis	45	Stay at home mum	Melbourne, Victoria	Season Runner-Up
Angela Fleay	47	Truck driver	Melbourne, Victoria	Eliminated (Episode 9)
James Dunsmore	31	Food historian	Sydney, New South Wales	Eliminated (Episode 8)
Nathan Taylor	19	Student	Perth, WA	Eliminated (Episode 7)
Benjamin "Ben" Brown	37	Mining inventory planner	Emerald, Queensland	Eliminated (Episode 6)
Brendan Eilola	43	IT specialist	Brisbane, Queensland	Eliminated (Episode 5)
Janice Tan	34	Management consultant	Sydney, New South Wales	Eliminated (Episode 4)
Meghan "Meg" Moorcroft	20	Student	Adelaide, South Australia	Eliminated (Episode 3)
Mariana Gates	55	Volunteer worker	Gold Coast, Queensland	Eliminated (Episode 2)
Dr. Peter "Pete" Rankin	58	Doctor	Melbourne, Victoria	Eliminated (Episode 1)

== Results summary ==
Elimination chart
Baker	1	2	3	4	5	6	7	8	9	10
Sian		SB			SB				SB	WINNER
Jasmin			SB				SB			Runner-Up
Suzy								SB		Runner-Up
Angela	SB			SB					OUT	
James						SB		OUT		
Nathan							OUT			
Ben						OUT				
Brendan					OUT					
Janice				OUT						
Meg			OUT							
Mariana		OUT								
Dr. Pete	OUT									

Colour key:

Got through to the next round	Awarded Star Baker	Season winner
One of the judges' favourite bakers that week	The baker was eliminated
One of the judges' least favourite bakers that week	Season runner-up

== Episodes ==
The baker was eliminated	Awarded Star Baker	Season winner

=== Episode 1: Cakes ===
For the bakers' first challenge, a family-sized signature cake was set. This was set to be done in two hours, and should show the baker's style. For the technical challenge, Maggie's recipe for her constitution cake. It combined indigenous Australian fruits and icing to make three cakes. It was to be done in two and a half hours. A hidden design cake was set as the showstopper challenge. In five hours, the bakers must create a cake that shows a pattern or design once cut into.

Baker	Signature (Signature Cake)	Technical (Maggie's Constitution cake)	Showstopper (Hidden design cake)
Angela	Chocolate cake with sour cream icing	1st	Mint and Chocolate cake
Ben	Triple layer sponge	2nd	Chocolate and Baileys Bundt cake
Brendan	Parsnip Carrot cake	8th	Orange and chocolate gateau
James	Carrot cake	5th	Starry-eyed cake
Janice	Japanese honey soufflé Cheesecake	4th	Pandan cake
Jasmin	Chocolate and salted caramel cake	3rd	British-at-heart cake
Mariana	Chocolate cherry cake	12th	Citrus pop surprise cake
Meg	Caramel Piñata cake	6th	Leopard print cake
Nathan	Blueberry and blood orange cake	11th	Chocolate and peanut butter cake
Dr. Pete	Tiramisu cake	10th	Red Cross cake
Sian	Chocolate and beetroot cake	9th	Battenberg cake
Suzy	Strawberry Angel cake	7th	Hidden glamour cake

=== Episode 2: Biscuits ===
Baker	Signature (12 filled biscuits)	Technical (Matt's Cannoli)	Showstopper (3D biscuit display)
Angela	Lemon Melting Moments	1st	Tiered Biscuit cake stand
Ben	Peach and bourbon Marshmallow biscuits	8th	Bacon and lime macaron tower
Brendan	Shooting Stars with choc-orange ganache	11th	Picassoesque Art of Biscuit
James	Orange Creams	5th	Child Catcher's Carriage
Janice	Chinese New Year pineapple cookies	3rd	Chinese Lantern
Jasmin	Chai latte biscuits	6th	Jasmin's Dream Bakery
Mariana	Lemon Shortbread biscuits with lemon butter	10th	Montenegrin Winter Scene
Meg	Jolly Nog biscuits with bourbon filling	9th	Moulin Rouge Windmill
Nathan	German Cinnamon biscuits	7th	Cranberry gingerbread teacup
Sian	Coffee Yo-yos with fig and ginger jam	4th	Black Forest cuckoo clock
Suzy	Sweethearts with buttercream and raspberry jam	2nd	Biscuit cake stand

=== Episode 3: Choux ===
Baker	Signature (12 individual Éclairs)	Technical (Matt's Paris-Brest)	Showstopper (Gateau St Honore centrepiece)
Angela	Coffee Éclairs	10th	Lemon Gateau St. Honoré
Ben	Mystery Éclairs	2nd	Cardamom, mandarin and ginger Gateau St. Honoré
Brendan	Pumpkin pie Éclairs	7th	Raspberry, chocolate and vanilla Gateau St. Honoré
James	Passionfruit Éclairs	6th	Choc-orange St. Honoré
Janice	Blueberry and lavender Éclairs	8th	Choc-banana and rum Gateau St. Honoré
Jasmin	Chocolate and salted caramel Éclairs	3rd	Coffee St. Honoré
Meg	Salted caramel Éclairs	9th	St 'Znoud'
Nathan	Mandarin and yuzu Éclairs	4th	Raspberry and pistachio Gateau St. Honoré
Sian	Lemon meringue Éclairs	1st	Opera St. Honoré
Suzy	'Pash Me Now' Éclairs	5th	Raspberry Gateau St. Honoré

=== Episode 4: Pies ===
Baker	Signature (6 individual savoury pies)	Technical (Maggie's Blood orange meringue pie)	Showstopper (Deep dish fruit pie)
Angela	Creamy lemon chicken Pies	5th	Fruit and almond Pie
Ben	Chicken, ham and leek Pies	2nd	Spiced pear and walnut Pie
Brendan	Chicken, bacon and vegetable Pies	7th	Baklava Pie
James	Pork and sage Pies	6th	Apple and nutmeg Pie
Janice	Chinese Pork Pies	9th	Compost Pie
Jasmin	Sage and pork Pies	1st	Very Berry Pie
Nathan	Satay pork Pies	3rd	Apple and blackberry Pie
Sian	Wild mushroom Pies	8th	Apple, prune and vino cotto Pie
Suzy	Perfect trio Pies	4th	Apple and pear Pie

=== Episode 5: Chocolate ===
Baker	Signature (Brownies)	Technical (Black Forest gateau)	Showstopper (Chocolate centrepiece)
Angela	Pecan and Cranberry Brownies	7th	Choc Medley
Ben	Thyme and Dark Chocolate Brownies	6th	Blossoming Fig
Brendan	Velvet Chocolate Brownies	1st	Chocolate and Strawberry Jewel Box
James	Chocolate Miso Brownies	8th	Chocolate Forest Lodge
Jasmin	Millionaire Brownies	2nd	Chocolate Trio Centrepiece
Nathan	Blackberry Cheesecake Brownies	4th	Chocolate and Raspberry Jaconde Medley
Sian	Italian Cheesecake Brownies	3rd	Chestnut and Chocolate Yule Log
Suzy	Circle of Never Ending Bliss	5th	Chocolate Medley

=== Episode 6: Bread ===
Baker	Signature (6 flavoured & 6 filled savoury Flatbreads)	Technical (8 Knotted Rolls)	Showstopper (Stollen Loaf Centrepiece)
Angela	Coriander and garlic Chapatis; Spicy Potato Pockets	5th	Christmas Stollen
Ben	Smoked garlic and fennel Naans; Gruyere Flatbreads	3rd	Peach and coffee Stollen
James	Besan flour Flatbreads; Halloumi Gozleme	6th	Barberry and fig Stollen
Jasmin	Tomato and olive Focaccia; Pesto Quesadillas	4th	Fruity Mince Stollen Wreath
Nathan	Nigella and garlic Naans; Aloo Naans	1st	Cherry and peach Stollen Wreath
Sian	Truffle Focaccias; Yoghurt filled Flatbreads	2nd	Date, chocolate and hazelnut Stollen
Suzy	Feta Flatbreads; Lemon chicken stuffed Flatbreads	7th	Easter Celebration Wreath

=== Episode 7: Dessert ===
Baker	Signature (5 Individual Hot Puddings)	Technical (Dried Apricot Pavlova)	Showstopper (3-Tiered Dessert)
Angela	Orange, pistachio and ginger Puddings	2nd	Tiered Dessert Stand
James	Date and chestnut Puddings	6th	Fruit Tart Stand
Jasmin	Spotted Dick Puddings	1st	'Fifty Shades of Lemon'
Nathan	Dark chocolate and pear Puddings	5th	'Carnival of Sweets'
Sian	Persimmon Puddings	3rd	Coconut Wedding Cake
Suzy	'Let me Date You' Puddings	4th	'Tart it Up'

=== Episode 8: Pastry ===
Baker	Signature (12 miniature savoury pastries)	Technical (Mushroom, thyme, leek pithivier)	Showstopper (Strudel centrepiece)
Angela	Pork, apple and sage sausage rolls Vegetable samosas	1st	Mango and apple strudel
James	Salmon and ginger galettes Empanadas	5th	Pear and hazelnut strudel
Jasmin	Beef mince Cornish pasties Vol au vents	4th	Strudel
Sian	Fennel and blue cheese danishes Pumpkin pasties	2nd	Sour cherry strudel
Suzy	Feta maznik Spinach and ricotta maznik	3rd	Cherry and bougatsa strudel

=== Episode 9: Classics ===
Baker	Signature (Doughnuts)	Technical (Passionfruit Tart)	Showstopper (High Tea)
Angela	Lemon Doughnuts	1st	Country Style High Tea
Jasmin	Classic Trio of Doughnuts	4th	Tea Plate
Sian	Chocolate and Liquorice Doughnuts	3rd	High Tea
Suzy	Doughnut Trio	2nd	International High Tea

=== Episode 10: Finale ===
Baker	Signature (12 signature vanilla slices)	Technical (Maggie's cornucopia cake)	Showstopper (Free Choice)
Jasmin	Vanilla slice	2nd	Tiers of Joy
Sian	Mille-feuille	1st	Tower of Profiteroles
Suzy	Vanilla slice	3rd	Never Ending Love

== Ratings ==
No.	Title	Air date	Overnight ratings		Ref(s)
No.	Title	Air date	Viewers	Rank	Ref(s)
1	"Cakes"	13 October 2015	104,000	1	
2	"Biscuits"	20 October 2015	102,000	1	
3	"Choux"	27 October 2015	109,000	1	
4	"Pies"	3 November 2015	81,000	1	
5	"Chocolate"	10 November 2015	111,000	1	
6	"Bread"	17 November 2015	91,000	1	
7	"Desserts"	24 November 2015	93,000	2	
8	"Pastry"	1 December 2015	126,000	1	
9	"Classics"	8 December 2015	131,000	1	
10	"Finale"	15 December 2015	136,000	1	
