= The Great Australian Bake Off season 1 =

Season of a television series

The Great Australian Bake Off
- Season 1
- Starring: Shane Jacobson; Anna Gare; Dan Lepard; Kerry Vincent
- No. of episodes: 8

Release
- Original network: Nine Network
- Original release: 9 July – 27 August 2013

Season chronology
- Next → Season 2

The first season of The Great Australian Bake Off premiered on 9 July 2013 on the Nine Network, and saw ten home bakers take part in a bake-off to test their baking skills as they battled to be crowned The Great Australian Bake Off's best amateur baker. The season consisted of 8 episodes. Each episode saw bakers put through three challenges, with each episode having its own theme or discipline. The season aired from 9 July 2013 until 27 August 2013, and saw Nancy Ho win. The season was hosted by Anna Gare and Shane Jacobson, and was judged by Dan Lepard and Kerry Vincent.

== The Bakers ==
The following is the list of the bakers that competed this season:

Baker	Age	Occupation	Hometown	Competition Status
Nancy Ho	22	Architecture Graduate	Brisbane, Queensland	Season Winner
Jonathan Gurfinkel	35	I.T. Guy	Melbourne, Victoria	Season Runner-Up
Maria Vella	45	Workplace Trainer	Melbourne, Victoria	Season Runner-Up
Monique Bowley	30	Former WNBL Star	Adelaide, South Australia	Eliminated (Episode 7)
Brendan Garlick	21	Uni Student	Springwood, New South Wales	Eliminated (Episode 6)
Julie Bonanno	41	Farm Mum	Shepparton, Victoria	Eliminated (Episode 5)
Mark Bartter	52	Chartered Accountant	Sydney, New South Wales	Eliminated (Episode 4)
Sara-Jane Smith	30	School Teacher	Melbourne, Victoria	Eliminated (Episode 3)
Bliss Nixon	23	Trivia Host	Gold Coast, Queensland	Eliminated (Episode 2)
Steve Lovett	28	Boxer	Canberra, Australian Capital Territory	Eliminated (Episode 1)

== Results summary ==
Elimination Chart
Baker	1	2	3	4	5	6	7	8
Nancy					SB			WINNER
Jonathan		SB		SB				Runner-Up
Maria	SB						SB	Runner-Up
Monique						SB	OUT	
Brendan						OUT		
Julie			SB		OUT			
Mark				OUT				
Sara-Jane			OUT					
Bliss		OUT						
Steve	OUT							

Colour key:

Got through to the next round	Awarded Star Baker	Season winner
One of the judges' favourite bakers that week	The baker was eliminated
One of the judges' least favourite bakers that week	Season runner-up

== Episodes ==
The baker was eliminated	Awarded Star Baker	Season winner

=== Episode 1: Cakes ===
For the first challenge, the bakers were required to make 24 cupcakes in two hours. The judges specified they wanted two different flavours of cupcake of which there should be 12 each. The Technical Challenge set was for a Checkerboard Cake, which was flavoured with chocolate and orange and had four layers. A Children's Party Cake was set as the Showstopper to be completed in five hours.

Baker	Signature (24 Cupcakes)	Technical (Chocolate & Orange Checkerboard Cake)	Showstopper (Children's Party Cake)
Bliss	White Chocolate & Passionfruit Cream Cupcakes; Flourless Choc Hazelnut Cupcakes	5	Princess Cake
Brendan	Raspberry Marshmallow Cupcakes; Peanut Butter Rocky Road Cupcakes	3	Flavoured Rainbow Cake
Jonathan	Cherry Cheesecake Cupcakes; Banana & Peanut Butter Cupcakes	6	3D Rocket Cake on Carved Half Moon
Julie	Pistachio & Rosewater Cupcakes; Spiced Pumpkin Cupcakes	7	Honey Hive Cake
Maria	Coffee, Chocolate & Hazelnut Cupcakes; Passionfruit Cupcakes with White Choc Ganache	2	Magical Butterfly Garden Raspberry Ripple Cake
Mark	Rose-Flavoured Buttercream Swirl Cupcakes; Orange & Grapefruit Curd Cupcakes	10	Chocolate Mud Cake with Plum Syrup
Monique	Vanilla & Rosewater Butterfly Cakes; Chocolate & Lemon Curd Cupcakes	4	Pool Cake
Nancy	Lemon Filled Lavender Cupcakes; Vietnamese Coffee Cupcake with Cinnamon Doughnuts	1	Ballerina Pillow Banana Cake
Sara-Jane	Coconut Cupcakes with Cinnamon Buttercream; Spiced Chocolate & Pear Cupcakes	8	"Very Vanilla" Rainbow Cake with Homemade Sprinkles
Steve	Flourless Orange, Linseed, Sunflower Seed & Almond Cupcakes; Coffee & Whisky Cupcakes	9	Banana Sandstone Castle Cake

=== Episode 2: Pies ===
A family pie was set as the first challenge, with two and a half hours being set as the time limit. The bakers had any choice of filling - sweet or savoury - and pastry, the only brief was that the pie must have a lid. For the next challenge, a lemon meringue pie was set, with the judges hoping for a perfectly cooked pastry, a set filling and a crispy meringue. For the Showstopper Challenge, the judges wanted 12 Party Pies, 12 Sausage Rolls and 12 Pasties in four hours.

Baker	Signature (Family Pie)	Technical (Lemon Meringue Pie)	Showstopper (36 Party Pies, Sausage Rolls & Pasties)
Bliss	Chicken Leek & Bacon Pie	9	Beef & Bacon Party Pies; Pork, Apple & Fennel Sausage Rolls; Spicy Curry Pasties
Brendan	Thai Chicken Pie	2	BBQ Chicken & Cheese Pies; Satay Pork Sausage Rolls; Beef & Bean Pasties
Jonathan	Garlic Prawn, Fish & Rice Pie	1	Chicken Kiev Party Pies; Layered Lamb Moussaka Pasties; Pumpkin & Ricotta Sfogliatelle
Julie	Moroccan Lamb & Sweet Potato Pie	6	Salmon & Fennel Party Pies; Curried Coriander Potato Pasties; Chicken, Bacon & Sundried Tomatoes Sausage Rolls
Maria	Aromatic Braised Beef Pie	5	Chicken & Apple Cider Pies; Spiced Samosa Pasties; Chicken & Sage Sausage Rolls
Mark	Cheese & Onion Pie	8	Shredded Pork Pies; Potato & Cauliflower Empanadas; Argentinian Beef Pampas Rolls
Monique	Chicken, Herb & Mushroom Pie	4	Mini Shepherd's Pies; Cornish Pasties; Classic Sausage Rolls
Nancy	Lamb Shank & Potato Pie	7	Smoky Chorizo Sausage Rolls; Pumpkin & Feta Pasties; BBQ Pork & Whisky Pies
Sara-Jane	Rabbit, Leek & Pistachio Pie	3	Mushroom Bourguignon Pies; Cauliflower Cheese Pasties; Vegetarian Sausage Rolls

=== Episode 3: Biscuits ===
For the Signature bake, 24 Aussie Assortments - classic Australian biscuits - were required of the bakers. In two and a half hours, the bakers had to make two different types of biscuit, 12 of each. 12 Brandy Snaps were set as the Technical Challenge, with the judges requesting they be 12 cm in length, and that ten be filled with cream and two be left for snapping. For the final challenge, a gingerbread structure was set, to be done in four hours.

Baker	Signature (24 Aussie Assortments)	Technical (Brandy Snaps)	Showstopper (Gingerbread Structure)
Brendan	Butterscotch ANZAC Biscuits; Lemon Myrtle Biscuits with Lemon Butter Cream	2	Sydney Harbour Bridge at NYE
Jonathan	Chocolate & Caramel Oat Biscuits; Chocolate Wagon Wheels	7	Giant Monster Robot
Julie	Macadamia, Mango & Passionfruit Shortbread; Chocolate Mint Yo-Yos	1	Outdoor Dunny
Maria	Mango Macadamia Melting Moments; Mint Marshmallow Swirl Biscuits	6	Eiffel Tower in Bloom
Mark	Australian Royal Mint Slice; Bitter Almond ANZAC Biscuits	5	High Country Hut
Monique	Choc Coconut Macarons; ANZAC Biscuits	3	Gingerbread Church
Nancy	Chocolate & Raspberry Wagon Wheels; Earl Grey Shortbread	4	Gingerbread Carousel
Sara-Jane	Cornflake Catastrophe Cookies; Fizzing Mandarin Creams	8	Wintry Village

=== Episode 4: Tarts ===
A tarte tatin was set for the Signature Challenge, to be completed within two and a half hours. For the Technical Challenge, a Quiche Lorraine was set, which used rough puff pastry and was to be finished again within two and a half hours. For their final challenge, the bakers were tasked with creating 12 miniature sweet tarts - half fruit and half chocolate.

Baker	Signature (Tarte Tatin)	Technical (Quiche Lorraine)	Showstopper (12 Miniature Sweet Tarts)
Brendan	Peppered Pineapple Tarte Tatin	1	Passionfruit Cream Tarts with Toffied Macadamias; Chocolate Tarts with Raspberries & Mint
Jonathan	Lamb Tarte Tatin	2	Chocolate Tarts with Hazelnut Frangipane; Lychee Tarts with Macadamia Praline
Julie	Banana & Pineapple Tarte Tatin	5	Passionfruit Mango Tarts; Peanut Butter Chocolate Tarts
Maria	Jackfruit & Banana Tarte Tatin	6	White Chocolate, Mango & Raspberry Tarts; Jaffa Tarts with Orange Liqueur
Mark	Apple, Raisin & Almond Tarte Tatin	4	Nectarine & Lemongrass Tartlets; Chocolate Cream Tartlets
Monique	Apple Tarte Tatin	7	Strawberry Cream Tarts; Salted Caramel & Chocolate Tarts
Nancy	Rum Spiced Caramel & Pineapple Tarte Tatin	3	Chocolate Marshmallow Tarts; Coconut & Orange Liqueur Tarts

=== Episode 5: Bread ===
In the Signature Challenge, the bakers were asked to make a loaf which was free-form (i.e - not in a tin) in two and a half hours. For the Technical, the challenge was Dan's recipe for coffee scrolls, which were filled with cinnamon and sultanas and were topped with a coffee glaze. The bakers had two and a half hours. Finally, the bakers had to make a bread basket (which did not have to necessarily be edible) and 24 rolls of two flavours for the Showstopper in four hours.

Baker	Signature (Free-Form Loaf)	Technical (Coffee Scroll)	Showstopper (Display Bread Basket + 24 Rolls)
Brendan	Rhubarb & Pink Lady Apple Bread	5	Pumpkin & Gorgonzola Rolls; Pecan Buns
Jonathan	Cinnamon & Poppy Seed Bread	1	Sausage & Sauerkraut Rolls; Whisky & Chocolate Iced Rolls
Julie	Pumpkin Pull-Apart Loaf	4	Pecan Cinnamon Rolls; Carrot & Cumin Rolls
Maria	Spinach & Feta Cheese Bread	2	Orange & Walnut Rosettes; Mini Pesto Parmesan Spiral Loaves
Monique	Spiced Fruit Cider Bread	6	Coconut Iced Sweet Buns; Cheesymite Scrolls
Nancy	Dukkah & Macadamia Plaited Loaf	3	Mexican Coffee Buns; Porcini, Truffle & Rosemary Dinner Rolls

=== Episode 6: Desserts ===
The bakers were first tasked with making one large baked cheesecake in two and a half hours, with the choice base (biscuit, pastry, etc.) and flavours being the baker's own. For the Technical bake, a layered pavlova torte was set as the challenge to be completed in two and a half hours. Consisting of three layers of meringue filled with whipped cream and summer fruits, the bakers were also asked to make their own strawberry sugar art. The Showstopper Challenge was a tiered celebration cake with at least two tiers.

Baker	Signature (Baked Cheesecake)	Technical (Layered Pavlova Torte)	Showstopper (Tiered Celebration Cake)
Brendan	White Chocolate & Brownie Cheesecake	5	Live Laugh Love 21st Birthday Cake
Jonathan	Cherry & Polish Cottage Cheese Cheesecake	3	Wedding Anniversary Cake
Maria	Honey, Orange Blossom & Rose Cheesecake	4	Red Velvet Engagement Cake
Monique	Lemon & Sour Cream Cheesecake with Fresh Blueberries	1	Ombre Wedding Cake
Nancy	Lime & Ginger Cheesecake	2	Orange Blossom Kokeshi Doll Cake

=== Episode 7: Pastry ===
For the first challenge, the bakers had to make a gluten-free fruit tart in two and a half hours which would serve eight people. For the next challenge, 6 croissants were set to be completed in four hours with jam of the baker's choice. A strudel was set as the Showstopper - it should be complete in two and a half hours, with the only criteria being it should be enough to feed eight people.

Baker	Signature (Gluten-Free Fruit Tart)	Technical (Croissants)	Showstopper (Strudel)
Jonathan	Strawberry Crème Brûlée Tart	3	Apple, Pear & Walnut Strudel
Maria	Spiced Raspberry Linzer Tart	1	Spiced Fig & Apple Strudel
Monique	Honey, Fig & Goat's Cheese Tart	4	Apple Strudel
Nancy	Walnut, Gorgonzola & Pear Tart	2	Pear & Chocolate Celebration Wreath

=== Episode 8: Finale ===
In the final Signature Challenge, the bakers had three and a half hours to make a large, multi-layered gâteau. In the Technical, choux pastry Religieuse were set. The bakers had to present three different flavours - chocolate, coffee and rose - and they had two and a half hours. Finally, the bakers had to make a selection of 36 petit-fours. The bakers were required to make three types - twelve of each.

Baker	Signature (Multi-Layered Gâteau)	Technical (La Religieuse)	Showstopper (36 Petits Fours)
Jonathan	Raspberry, Walnut & Praline Layered Meringue	1	Pistachio Crusted Choux Puffs with Turkish Delight; Hungarian Dobos Torte; Macadamia Tuile Cones with Strawberry Cream & Coconut Ganache
Maria	Chocolate Sponge Gâteau with Choc-Cherry Mousse	2	Mini Lemon Cream Tartlets; Toffee Cream Choux Puffs; Raspberry Brûlée Custard Tarts
Nancy	Passionfruit Sponge with Chocolate Caramel Mousse	3	Earl Grey & Lavender Opera Cake; Lemon Tart with Candied Kumquat Tuile; Lychee Rose Mini Choux Nuns

== Ratings ==
No.	Title	Air date	Overnight ratings		Ref(s)
No.	Title	Air date	Viewers	Rank	Ref(s)
1	"Cakes"	9 July 2013	1.119 million	5	
2	"Pies"	16 July 2013	1.089 million	5	
3	"Biscuits"	23 July 2013	0.994 million	9	
4	"Tarts"	30 July 2013	0.722 million	15	
5	"Bread"	6 August 2013	0.675 million	15	
6	"Desserts"	13 August 2013	0.692 million	13	
7	"Pastry"	20 August 2013	0.622 million	18	
8	"Finale"	27 August 2013	0.760 million	13	
