= The Great Australian Bake Off season 9 =

Season of a television series

The Great Australian Bake Off
- Season 9
- Starring: Tom Walker; Natalie Tran; Darren Purchese; Rachel Khoo
- No. of episodes: 10

Release
- Original network: LifeStyle
- Original release: 29 July – 30 September 2025

Season chronology
- ← Previous; Season 8

The ninth season of the television competition series The Great Australian Bake Off premiered on 29 July 2025 on the LifeStyle channel. The season sees twelve home bakers take part in a bake-off to test their baking skills as they compete to be the series' best amateur baker. The season consists of ten episodes, each of which sees bakers put through three challenges, with each episode having its own theme or discipline. The season is hosted by Natalie Tran and Tom Walker (taking over from Cal Wilson after her death) and is judged by Darren Purchese and Rachel Khoo. The season was won by Beth Hoy. The other finalists were Jess Synon, and Vanessa Furci.

== Contestants ==
The following is the list of the bakers that compete in this season:

| Baker | Age | Occupation | Competition Status |
|---|---|---|---|
| Beth Hoy | 37 | Pastor | Season Winner |
| Jess Synon | 31 | Business Analyst | Season Runner-Up |
| Vanessa Furci | 34 | Oncology Nurse | Season Runner-Up |
| Tatiana Markovic | 55 | Nurse | Eliminated (Episode 9) |
| Anirban Chanda | 38 | Senior Knowledge Manager | Eliminated (Episode 8) |
| Aysha Moulton | 32 | Production Co-ordinator | Eliminated (Episode 7) |
| Brian Rooney | 51 | Stay-At-Home Dad | Eliminated (Episode 6) |
| Jai Johns | 28 | Barista | Eliminated (Episode 5) |
| Kelarnie Whalen | 22 | Recruitment Consultant | Eliminated (Episode 4) |
| Wesley Mitton | 37 | Digital E-commerce Director | Eliminated (Episode 3) |
| Erik Newcomb | 43 | E-Commerce Director | Eliminated (Episode 2) |
| Gregson Gastar | 44 | Hairdresser | Eliminated (Episode 1) |

== Results summary ==
Elimination Chart
| Baker | 1 | 2 | 3 | 4 | 5 | 6 | 7 | 8 | 9 | 10 |
|---|---|---|---|---|---|---|---|---|---|---|
| Beth | SB | | | | | SB | | SB | | WINNER |
| Jess | | | | | SB | | | | SB | Runner-Up |
| Vanessa | | | | | | | SB | | | Runner-Up |
| Tatiana | | | | SB | | | | | OUT | |
| Anirban | | | SB | | | | | OUT | | |
| Aysha | | SB | | | | | OUT | | | |
| Brian | | | | | | OUT | | | | |
| Jai | | | | | OUT | | | | | |
| Kelarnie | | | | OUT | | | | | | |
| Wesley | | | OUT | | | | | | | |
| Erik | | OUT | | | | | | | | |
| Gregson | OUT | | | | | | | | | |

Colour key:

| Got through to the next round | Awarded Star Baker | Season winner |
| One of the judges' favourite bakers that week | The baker was eliminated |
| One of the judges' least favourite bakers that week | Season runner-up |

== Episodes ==
| The baker was eliminated | Awarded Star Baker | Season winner |

=== Episode 1: Cake Week ===
Airdate: 29 July 2025

| Baker | Signature (Imprime Roll) | Technical (Eszterházy Torte) | Showstopper (Gravity Defying Cake) |
|---|---|---|---|
| Anirban | Patishapta Roll | 6th | Truffle Topple Fudge |
| Aysha | Sol-Ozzy Roll | 5th | Sweet Basketball Trick |
| Beth | Thyme for Peace | 1st | Cake Gone Wrong |
| Brian | Blackforest Roll | 8th | Sunday Picnic |
| Erik | Beachfront Sunrise | 10th | Golf Ball on a Tee |
| Gregson | Dancing Pineapple Roll | 12th | Gum Tree |
| Jai | Matcha Made In Heaven | 9th | Breakfast in Istanbul |
| Jess | Zesty Lemon Sponge Roll | 7th | Witches' Brew |
| Kelarnie | Summer Breeze | 4th | Kween Bee |
| Tatiana | Folkloric Flower Roll | 2nd | Popping Pot |
| Vanessa | Lemon Roll | 3rd | Oops, I Forgot the Milk |
| Wesley | Lickin' the Beaters | 11th | Dad's Trout |

=== Episode 2: Biscuit Week ===
Airdate: 5 August 2025

| Baker | Signature (Decorated Sandwich Biscuits) | Technical (Pistachio Shortbread) | Showstopper (Biscuit Diorama) |
|---|---|---|---|
| Anirban | Passion Spice Snaps | 3rd | Future Bakery |
| Aysha | Turtle-y Awesome Macarons | 6th | A Round of Biscuits |
| Beth | Zannie's Rainbow Biscuits | 7th | Riverbend Park |
| Brian | Yuzu Kourabiedes | 10th | Hunting Bikkies |
| Erik | Hot Chocolate & S'mores | 9th | Travels Around the Globe |
| Jai | Marbled Marvel | 5th | Scenes From Home |
| Jess | Matcha & Chocolate Shortbread | 8th | Dino-Rama |
| Kelarnie | Sweet Sushi | 2nd | Football Game |
| Tatiana | Chocolate Peppermint Cookies | 11th | Dogs Just Wanna Have Fun |
| Vanessa | Lime Crisp Kisses | 1st | Sweet Ocean View |
| Wesley | Ruby Red Ring | 4th | Sunday Market Flower Stand |

=== Episode 3: Pie Week ===
Airdate: 12 August 2025

| Baker | Signature (Party Pies) | Technical (Galette Des Rois) | Showstopper (Fruity Tangram Pie) |
|---|---|---|---|
| Anirban | Indo-Aussie Chicken Party Pies | 5th | Mulled Wine Tangram Pie |
| Aysha | Chicken & Ngali Nut Party Pies | 4th | Lemon & Blueberry Tangram Pie |
| Beth | Moroccan Lamb Party Pies | 3rd | Tropical Tangram Pie |
| Brian | Par-Aussian Cassoulet Party Pies | 2nd | Apple Tangram Pie |
| Jai | Masok Merah Party Pies | 7th | Strawberry & Pistachio Tangram Pie |
| Jess | Lamb Rogan Josh Party Pies | 1st | Yuzu & Black Sesame Tangram Pie |
| Kelarnie | Miso Chicken Party Pies | 6th | Passionfruit Tangram Pie |
| Tatiana | Seafood Party Pies | 10th | Chocolate & Orange Tangram Pie |
| Vanessa | Ricotta & Silverbeet Party Pies | 8th | Strawberry & Kiwi Tangram Pie |
| Wesley | Larb Gai Party Pies | 9th | Rhubarb Tangram Pie |

=== Episode 4: Bread Week ===
Airdate: 19 August 2025

| Baker | Signature (Mini Bagels) | Technical (Turkish Bread with Za'atar) | Showstopper (Reveal Bread) |
|---|---|---|---|
| Anirban | Tokyo to Dehli Kulcha Bagels | 9th | Turducken |
| Aysha | French Toast Bagels | 4th | 100 and Bun Dalmatians |
| Beth | Potica Bagels | 3rd | Sunshine in a Sunflower |
| Brian | Chocolate Spiced Bagels | 2nd | Sleeping Dragon |
| Jai | Gochujang Bagels | 5th | The Earth's Core |
| Jess | Bush Bagels | 7th | Octopus Bread |
| Kelarnie | Cinnamon Scroll Bagels | 8th | Snake Bread |
| Tatiana | Blueberry & Lemon Bagels | 6th | A Nurse's Life |
| Vanessa | Carrot Cake Bagels | 1st | Rainbow After the Storm |

=== Episode 5: Tropical Week ===
Airdate: 26 August 2025

| Baker | Signature (Tropical Tart) | Technical (Mille Feuille) | Showstopper (Meringue Bomb) |
|---|---|---|---|
| Anirban | Mango Yuzu Tartlets | 5th | Custard Apple Bombes |
| Aysha | Mango Unchained | 4th | That's Coconuts, But Yuzu You Boo |
| Beth | Pomelo Citrus Tarts | 8th | Island Dream Bombes |
| Brian | Guava Lava Flowers | 1st | Cocoa Pod Bombes |
| Jai | Beachy Banoffee Tarts | 7th | Calaman-See Ya Next Week |
| Jess | Pina Colada Tarts | 3rd | Coco-Loco Coconuts |
| Tatiana | Tropical Daisy Tarts | 6th | Passionfruit Bombes |
| Vanessa | It Takes Two to Mango | 2nd | Pina Colada Bombes |

=== Episode 6: Little & Large Week ===
Airdate: 2 September 2025

| Baker | Signature (Mini Tiered Cakes) | Technical (Giant Chocolate Eclair) | Showstopper (Biscuit City) |
|---|---|---|---|
| Anirban | Four Elements of Nature | 5th | La Biscuit Ciudad |
| Aysha | Slice of Paradise | 2nd | House of Flames |
| Beth | Midsummer Night's Dream | 1st | Community Church |
| Brian | Mini Snowman | 4th | Department Store |
| Jess | Frog on a Log | 3rd | Town Hall |
| Tatiana | Childhood Days | 7th | 1920s Apartment Block |
| Vanessa | Blueberry Garden | 6th | Viva La Cuba |

=== Episode 7: Japan Week ===
Airdate: 9 September 2025

| Baker | Signature (Shokupan Buns) | Technical (Matcha & Black Sesame Crepe Roll) | Showstopper (Double Fromage Cheesecake) |
|---|---|---|---|
| Anirban | Goji Berry Shokupan Buns | 5th | Jaggery & Fennel Cheesecake |
| Aysha | Pandan & Coconut Shokupan Buns | 1st | Tropical Cheesecake |
| Beth | Coriander Shokupan Buns | 2nd | Strawberry & Champagne Cheesecake |
| Jess | Chocolate & Pistachio Shokupan Buns | 6th | Coffee & Rum Cheesecake |
| Tatiana | Raspberry & Rose Shokupan Buns | 4th | Apple & Cinnamon Cheesecake |
| Vanessa | Honeydew & Coconut Shokupan Buns | 3rd | Tiramisu Cheesecake |

=== Episode 8: Earth Week ===
Airdate: 16 September 2025

| Baker | Signature (Raw Cake) | Technical (Beetroot Tart) | Showstopper (Edible Terrarium) |
|---|---|---|---|
| Anirban | Mango Raw Cake | 5th | Sweet Sands |
| Beth | Watermelon and Hibiscus Cake | 1st | Arid Desert Terrarium |
| Jess | Strawberry Raw Cake | 3rd | Oma's Garden |
| Tatiana | Chocolate and Raspberry Cake | 2nd | Black Forest Terrarium |
| Vanessa | Avocado and Raspberry Cake | 4th | Mushroom Forest |

=== Episode 9: Patisserie Week ===
Airdate: 23 September 2025

| Baker | Signature (En Croute) | Technical (Spiced Charlotte Russe) | Showstopper (Modern Viennoiserie) |
|---|---|---|---|
| Beth | Winter Roast En Croute | 2nd | Fruity French Pastries |
| Jess | Lasagna En Croute | 1st | Modern Love Viennoiserie |
| Tatiana | Homestyle En Croute | 3rd | Sunday Breakfast |
| Vanessa | Mexican Fiesta En Croute | 4th | European Odyssey |

=== Episode 10: Final ===
Airdate: 30 September 2025

| Baker | Signature (Top Forward Cake) | Technical (Raspberry & Chocolate Entremet) | Showstopper (Choux Stopper) |
|---|---|---|---|
| Beth | Greener Pastures | 1st | My Baking Roots |
| Jess | Hobbit Home | 3rd | Devil's Ivy |
| Vanessa | Red Velvet Birthday Cake | 2nd | Flour & Eggs |
