= The Great Australian Bake Off =

Australian television baking series

- Genre: Baking, cooking
- Presented by: Shane Jacobson (2013); Anna Gare (2013); Claire Hooper (2015–2022); Mel Buttle (2015–2022); Cal Wilson (2023–2024); Natalie Tran (2023–); Tom Walker (2025–)
- Judges: Dan Lepard (2013); Kerry Vincent (2013); Maggie Beer (2015–2022); Matt Moran (2015–2022); Darren Purchese (2023–); Rachel Khoo (2023–)
- Country of origin: Australia
- Original language: English
- No. of seasons: 10
- No. of episodes: 88

Production
- Executive producers: Lara Hopkins (2013); Nicole Rogers (2016–2018); Alenka Henry (2021–2023); Emily Commens (2024–)
- Production locations: Werribee Park Mansion (2013); Yaralla Estate (2015); Sydney, New South Wales (2018–)
- Cinematography: Sam Collines (2013); Steve Davis (2021–)
- Running time: 60 minutes
- Production companies: Love Productions (2013); Fremantle Australia (2015–2019); BBC Studios Australia (2021–)

Original release
- Network: Nine Network (2013); LifeStyle Food (2015–2016); LifeStyle (2018–)
- Release: 9 July 2013 – present

The Great Australian Bake Off is an Australian television baking series that is based on the BBC baking competition The Great British Bake Off.

The series first premiered on 9 July 2013 on the Nine Network and ran for one season with presenters Shane Jacobson and Anna Gare and judges Dan Lepard and Kerry Vincent. On 1 April 2015, it was announced that the series had been picked up by pay television channel LifeStyle Food and production company FremantleMedia Australia for a second season which premiered on 13 October 2015 with presenters Claire Hooper and Mel Buttle and judges Maggie Beer and Matt Moran. Another three seasons aired on LifeStyle Food and LifeStyle between 2016 and 2019.

In December 2020, there was speculation the series was to be picked up by the Seven Network for its sixth season, however in March 2021, Foxtel was in "advanced discussions" for a series return. In June 2021, it was officially renewed by Foxtel with auditions open from June to 18 July 2021, with BBC Studios Australia taking over production from Fremantle Australia. The sixth season premiered on 27 January 2022.

On 4 August 2022, Foxtel announced a new-look seventh season had been commissioned, to air in 2023 with filming commencing in September. Maggie Beer, Matt Moran, Claire Hooper and Mel Buttle departed the show; on 30 August 2022 Foxtel revealed pastry chef Darren Purchese and culinary expert Rachel Khoo as the show's new judges, with comedians Cal Wilson and Natalie Tran to host. The seventh season premiered on 13 June 2023. Maggie Beer made a guest appearance in the seventh season. The eighth season, filmed earlier in 2023, aired in 2024 and was the second and final appearance of Cal Wilson as host as she died in October 2023. The eighth season premiered on 18 September 2024 and honoured Cal Wilson. In June 2025, Foxtel announced comedian Tom Walker would take over Wilson's position as co-host alongside Tran and began airing on 29 July 2025. A tenth season will premiere on 11 August 2026.

== Format ==
The programme operates on a weekly elimination process to find the best all-round amateur baker from the contestants, where in each episode the bakers are tasked with 3 different challenges; a signature bake, a technical bake and a show-stopper. The bakes are critically examined by the judges who will then choose a "Star Baker" and a baker that is eliminated from the competition. Ten contestants were chosen for the first season, and twelve contestants were chosen for each subsequent season.

Signature Challenge: This challenge is for the amateur bakers to show off their tried-and-tested recipes that are rustic and altogether home-made-looking.
Technical Challenge: This challenge shows who can follow instructions, but who also has the technical knowledge and experience to produce the finished product. The bakers are all given the same recipe and are not told beforehand what the challenge will be. The finished product is ranked from worst to best, with the judges not knowing who produced which.
Showstopper Challenge: This challenge is for the bakers to show off their skills and talent. The judges are looking for a bake that is both of a professional appearance but also in taste.

== Hosts and judges ==
Hosts/Judges	Season								
Hosts/Judges	1	2	3	4	5	6	7	8	9
Shane Jacobson	Host								
Anna Gare	Host								
Dan Lepard	Judge								
Kerry Vincent	Judge								
Claire Hooper		Host							
Mel Buttle		Host							
Maggie Beer		Judge					Guest		
Matt Moran		Judge							
Cal Wilson							Host		
Natalie Tran							Host		
Darren Purchese							Judge		
Rachel Khoo							Judge		
Tom Walker									Host

== Season overview ==
Seasons	Prize	Episodes	Originally released			Runners-up	Winner
Seasons	Prize	Episodes	First released	Last released	Network	Runners-up	Winner
One	Kitchen Renovation & Retreat Holiday	8	9 July 2013	27 August 2013	Nine Network	Jonathan Gurfinkel Maria Vella	Nancy Ho
Two	None	10	13 October 2015	15 December 2015	LifeStyle Food	Jasmin Hartley Susie Stefanidis	Sian Redgrave
Three	None	10	11 October 2016	14 December 2016	LifeStyle Food	Monica Cavallaro Antonio Marcora	Olivia McMahon
Four	None	10	18 January 2018	22 March 2018	LifeStyle	Barb Dunn Dave Yan	Claudia Anton
Five	None	10	3 October 2019	5 December 2019	LifeStyle	David Hills Dan Pasquali	Sunny Nasir Ahmad
Six	None	10	27 January 2022	31 March 2022	LifeStyle	Aaron Hawton Nurman Noor	Ella Rossanis
Seven	"Ultimate Bakers' Kitchen" by Smeg	10	13 June 2023	15 August 2023	LifeStyle	Adam Miller Ilona Nicola	Laura Foo
Eight	"Ultimate Bakers' Kitchen" by Smeg	10	18 September 2024	20 November 2024	LifeStyle	Dimi Jayawardene Elliot Styche	Arvin Garcia
Nine	"Ultimate Bakers' Kitchen" by Smeg	10	29 July 2025	30 September 2025	LifeStyle	Jess Synon Vanessa Furci	Beth Hoy
Ten	TBA	10	11 August 2026	13 October 2026	LifeStyle	Branden Khou Matt Perillo-Phipps	Pamela Buchanan

=== Season 1 (2013) ===
Season 1 of The Great Australian Bake Off saw 10 home bakers take part in a bake-off to test their baking skills as they battled to be crowned The Great Australian Bake Off's best amateur baker. Each episode saw bakers put through three challenges, with each episode having its own theme or discipline. The season aired from 9 July 2013 until 27 August 2013.

The three finalists were Jonathan Gurfinkel, Nancy Ho, Maria Vella. On 27 August 2013, Nancy Ho was selected as the best amateur baker.

Baker	Age	Occupation	Hometown	Competition Status
Nancy Ho	22	Architecture Graduate	Brisbane, Queensland	Season Winner
Jonathan Gurfinkel	35	I.T. Guy	Melbourne, Victoria	Season Runner-Up
Maria Vella	45	Workplace Trainer	Melbourne, Victoria	Season Runner-Up
Monique Bowley	30	Former WNBL Star	Adelaide, South Australia	Eliminated (Episode 7)
Brendan Garlick	21	Uni Student	Springwood, New South Wales	Eliminated (Episode 6)
Julie Bonanno	41	Farm Mum	Shepparton, Victoria	Eliminated (Episode 5)
Mark Bartter	52	Chartered Accountant	Sydney, New South Wales	Eliminated (Episode 4)
Sara-Jane Smith	30	School Teacher	Melbourne, Victoria	Eliminated (Episode 3)
Bliss Nixon	23	Trivia Host	Gold Coast, Queensland	Eliminated (Episode 2)
Steve Lovett	28	Boxer	Canberra, Australian Capital Territory	Eliminated (Episode 1)

=== Season 2 (2015) ===
Season 2 of The Great Australian Bake Off saw 12 home bakers take part in a bake-off to test their baking skills as they battled to be crowned The Great Australian Bake Off's best amateur baker. Each episode saw bakers put through three challenges, with each episode having its own theme or discipline. The season aired from 13 October 2015 until 15 December 2015.

The three finalists were Jasmin Hartley, Sian Redgrave, and Suzy Stefanidis. On 15 December 2015, Sian Redgrave was selected as the best amateur baker.

Baker	Age	Occupation	Hometown	Competition Status
Sian Redgrave	23	Fashion boutique stylist	Perth, Western Australia	Season Winner
Jasmin Hartley	27	Barista	Mackay, Queensland	Season Runner-Up
Suzy Stefanidis	45	Stay at home mum	Melbourne, Victoria	Season Runner-Up
Angela Fleay	47	Truck driver	Melbourne, Victoria	Eliminated (Episode 9)
James Dunsmore	31	Food historian	Sydney, New South Wales	Eliminated (Episode 8)
Nathan Taylor	19	Student	Perth, WA	Eliminated (Episode 7)
Benjamin "Ben" Brown	37	Mining inventory planner	Emerald, Queensland	Eliminated (Episode 6)
Brendan Eilola	43	IT specialist	Brisbane, Queensland	Eliminated (Episode 5)
Janice Tan	34	Management consultant	Sydney, New South Wales	Eliminated (Episode 4)
Meghan "Meg" Moorcroft	20	Student	Adelaide, South Australia	Eliminated (Episode 3)
Mariana Gates	55	Volunteer worker	Gold Coast, Queensland	Eliminated (Episode 2)
Dr. Peter "Pete" Rankin	58	Doctor	Melbourne, Victoria	Eliminated (Episode 1)

=== Season 3 (2016) ===
Season 3 of The Great Australian Bake Off saw 12 home bakers take part in a bake-off to test their baking skills as they battled to be crowned The Great Australian Bake Off's best amateur baker. Each episode saw bakers put through three challenges, with each episode having its own theme or discipline. The season aired from 11 October 2016 until 14 December 2016.

The three finalists were Monica Cavallaro, Antonio Marcona, and Olivia McMahon. On 13 December 2016, Olivia McMahon was selected as the best amateur baker.

Baker	Age	Occupation	Hometown	Competition Status
Olivia McMahon	37	Fine Dining Waitress	Brisbane, Queensland	Season Winner
Monica Cavallaro	43	Retail Manager	Sydney, New South Wales	Season Runner-Up
Antonio Marcora	16	School Student	Sydney, New South Wales	Season Runner-Up
Liesel Morgan	20	University Student	Perth, Western Australia	Eliminated (Episode 9)
Fiona Nguyen	32	Patent & Trademark Lawyer	Brisbane, Queensland	Eliminated (Episode 8)
James Rudd	26	IT Technical Support	Perth, Western Australia	Eliminated (Episode 7)
Noel Button	59	Retired Teacher	Launceston, Tasmania	Eliminated (Episode 6)
Jeremy Allan	30	Welding & Vessel Inspector	Adelaide, South Australia	Eliminated (Episode 5)
Bojan Petrovic	37	Tow Truck Business Owner	Canberra, Australian Capital Territory	Eliminated (Episode 4)
Diana Gyllen	29	Model	Sydney, New South Wales	Eliminated (Episode 3)
Cheryl Roberts	59	Horse Trainer	Berry, New South Wales	Eliminated (Episode 2)
Janette Betts	62	Palliative Care Nurse	Melbourne, Victoria	Eliminated (Episode 1)

=== Season 4 (2018) ===
Season 4 of The Great Australian Bake Off saw 12 home bakers take part in a bake-off to test their baking skills as they battled to be crowned The Great Australian Bake Off's best amateur baker. Each episode saw bakers put through three challenges, with each episode having its own theme or discipline. The season aired from 18 January 2018 until 22 March 2018.

The three finalists were Claudia Anton, Barb Dunn, and Dave Yan. On 22 March 2018, Claudia Anton was selected as the best amateur baker.

Baker	Age	Occupation	Hometown	Competition Status
Claudia Anton	48	Psychiatrist	Melbourne, Victoria	Season Winner
Barbara "Barb" Dunn	37	Finance manager	Brisbane, Queensland	Season Runner-Up
Dave Yan	35	Chartered Accountant	Sydney, New South Wales	Season Runner-Up
Christopher "Chris" Asquith	32	System administrator	Newcastle, New South Wales	Eliminated (Episode 9)
Raeesa Khatree	37	Health store worker (former lawyer)	Brisbane, Queensland	Eliminated (Episode 8)
Robert Harwood	34	I.T. administrator	Perth, Western Australia	Eliminated (Episode 7)
Marcus Matear	27	Dentist	Melbourne, Victoria	Eliminated (Episode 6)
Michelle Trevorrow	64	Retiree	Melbourne, Victoria	Eliminated (Episode 5)
Emma Sievwright	23	Science graduate	Brisbane, Queensland	Eliminated (Episode 4)
Max Fetiveau	28	Plasterer	Brisbane, Queensland	Eliminated (Episode 3)
Alexander "Alex" Papadopoulos	47	Building material importer	Melbourne, Victoria	Eliminated (Episode 2)
Jessica Osborne	28	Sales co-ordinator	Brisbane, Queensland	Eliminated (Episode 1)

=== Season 5 (2019) ===
Season 5 of The Great Australian Bake Off saw 12 home bakers take part in a bake-off to test their baking skills as they battled to be crowned The Great Australian Bake Off's best amateur baker. Each episode saw bakers put through three challenges, with each episode having its own theme or discipline. The season aired from 3 October 2019 until 5 December 2019.

The three finalists were Subha Nasir Ahmad, David Hills, and Daniel Pasquali. On 5 December 2019, Subha Nasir Ahmad was selected as the best amateur baker.

Baker	Age	Occupation	Hometown	Competition Status
Subha "Sunny" Nasir Ahmad	26	PHD Science Student	Sydney, New South Wales	Season Winner
Daniel "Dan" Pasquali	35	Research Scientist	Brisbane, Queensland	Season Runner-Up
David Hills	41	Project Manager	Melbourne, Victoria	Season Runner-Up
Donald "Don" Hackett	55	Superannuation Consultant	Sydney, New South Wales	Eliminated (Episode 9)
Angela Navacchi	36	Housewife	Adelaide, South Australia	Eliminated (Episode 8)
Wynn Visser	36	Disability Services Manager	Sydney, New South Wales	Eliminated (Episode 7)
Anston Ratnayake	28	Student Voice Officer	Sydney, New South Wales	Eliminated (Episode 6)
Sue Dahman	70	Retired Bank Manager	Sydney, New South Wales	Eliminated (Episode 4)
Laura Peters	22	Cafe Manager	New South Wales	Left (Episode 3)
Dennis Mews	71	Retired Maths Teacher	Melbourne, Victoria	Eliminated (Episode 3)
Annette Peffers	48	Account Manager	Gold Coast, Queensland	Eliminated (Episode 2)
Zee Scott	39	Marriage Celebrant	Melbourne, Victoria	Eliminated (Episode 1)

=== Season 6 (2022) ===
Season 6 of The Great Australian Bake Off saw 12 home bakers take part in a bake-off to test their baking skills as they battled to be crowned The Great Australian Bake Off's best amateur baker. Each episode saw bakers put through three challenges, with each episode having its own theme or discipline. The season aired from 27 January 2022 until 31 March 2022.

The three finalists were Aaron Hawton, Nurman Noor, and Ella Rossanis. On 31 March 2022, Ella Rossanis was selected as the best amateur baker.

Baker	Age	Occupation	Competition Status
Ella Rossanis	35	Creative Copywriter	Season Winner
Aaron Hawton	31	High School Teacher	Season Runner-Up
Nurman Noor	35	General Practitioner	Season Runner-Up
Hoda Alzubaidi	28	Publishing Sales	Eliminated (Episode 9)
Jawin Ratchawong	27	Public Servant	Eliminated (Episode 8)
Carmel Scassa	48	Document Controller	Eliminated (Episode 7)
Haydn Allbutt	46	Scientist & Stay-at-home Dad	Eliminated (Episode 6)
Ashley Callaghan	30	Retired Navy Veteran	Left (Episode 5)
Naveid 'Nav' Zarshoy	32	Recruitment Consultant	Eliminated (Episode 4)
Blessing Mudzikitiri	19	Disability Support Worker	Eliminated (Episode 3)
Tom Mosby	52	CEO	Eliminated (Episode 2)
Lidia Morosin	62	Retail Sales	Eliminated (Episode 1)

=== Season 7 (2023) ===
Season 7 of The Great Australian Bake Off saw 12 home bakers take part in a bake-off to test their baking skills as they battled to be crowned The Great Australian Bake Off's best amateur baker. Each episode saw bakers put through three challenges, with each episode having its own theme or discipline. The season aired from 13 June 2023 until 15 August 2023.

The three finalists were Laura Foo, Adam Miller, and Ilona Nicola. On 15 August 2023, Laura Foo was selected as the best amateur baker.

Baker	Age	Occupation	Hometown	Competition Status
Laura Foo	26	Management Consultant	VIC	Season Winner
Adam Miller	37	Communications Manager	VIC	Season Runner-Up
Ilona Nicola	41	Health Policy Advisor	VIC	Season Runner-Up
Sandra Walter	59	Manager	QLD	Eliminated (Episode 9)
Neil Higgins	42	Scale Technician	WA	Eliminated (Episode 8)
Reem El Daouk	20	Student	VIC	Eliminated (Episode 7)
Galya Dissanayake	34	Channel Marketer	NSW	Eliminated (Episode 6)
Gavin Turner	58	Team Leader	QLD	Eliminated (Episode 5)
Felicity Dobson	38	Learning And Development Manager	WA	Eliminated (Episode 4)
Laurent La	37	Sales Assistant	QLD	Eliminated (Episode 3)
Natalie Levy	41	Self-Employed	NSW	Eliminated (Episode 2)
Guillermo Urra	41	Flight Attendant	VIC	Eliminated (Episode 1)

=== Season 8 (2024) ===
Season 8 of The Great Australian Bake Off saw 12 home bakers take part in a bake-off to test their baking skills as they battled to be crowned The Great Australian Bake Off's best amateur baker. Each episode saw bakers put through three challenges, with each episode having its own theme or discipline. The season aired from 18 September 2024.

Baker	Age	Occupation	Hometown	Competition Status
Arvin Garcia	36	Nurse	VIC	Season Winner
Dimi Jayawardene	40	Early Childhood Teacher	NSW	Season Runner-Up
Elliot Styche	34	Singing Teacher	NSW	Season Runner-Up
Laurina Bowlen	36	50s Dress Designer	QLD	Eliminated (Episode 9)
Adrian Barila	28	Theatre Performer	VIC	Eliminated (Episode 8)
Molly Cameron	16	School Student	NSW	Eliminated (Episode 7)
Melisa Chilimanzi	30	Digital Manager	NSW	Eliminated (Episode 6)
Jason Verner	34	Bartender	WA	Eliminated (Episode 5)
Jaden Briggs	30	K'gari Tour Guide	QLD	Eliminated (Episode 4)
Ryan Fielder	29	Learning Co-ordinator	VIC	Eliminated (Episode 4)
Vicki Priest	43	Government Officer	NSW	Eliminated (Episode 2)
Jill Carnovale	70	Retired	NSW	Eliminated (Episode 1)

=== Season 9 (2025) ===
Season 9 of The Great Australian Bake Off saw 12 home bakers take part in a bake-off to test their baking skills as they battled to be crowned The Great Australian Bake Off's best amateur baker. Each episode will see bakers put through three challenges, with each episode having its own theme or discipline. The season aired from 29 July 2025.

Baker	Age	Occupation	Competition Status
Beth Hoy	37	Pastor	Season Winner
Jess Synon	31	Business Analyst	Season Runner-Up
Vanessa Furci	34	Oncology Nurse	Season Runner-Up
Tatiana Markovic	55	Nurse	Eliminated (Episode 9)
Anirban Chanda	38	Senior Knowledge Manager	Eliminated (Episode 8)
Aysha Moulton	32	Production Co-ordinator	Eliminated (Episode 7)
Brian Rooney	51	Stay-At-Home Dad	Eliminated (Episode 6)
Jai Johns	28	Barista	Eliminated (Episode 5)
Kelarnie Whalen	22	Recruitment Consultant	Eliminated (Episode 4)
Wesley Mitton	37	Digital E-commerce Director	Eliminated (Episode 3)
Erik Newcomb	43	E-Commerce Director	Eliminated (Episode 2)
Gregson Gastar	44	Hairdresser	Eliminated (Episode 1)

=== Season 10 (2026) ===
Season 10 of The Great Australian Bake Off saw 12 home bakers take part in a bake-off to test their baking skills as they battled to be crowned The Great Australian Bake Off's best amateur baker. Each episode will see bakers put through three challenges, with each episode having its own theme or discipline. The season will air from 11 August 2026.

Baker	Age	Occupation	Competition Status
Pamela Buchanan	41	Stay-at-home mum	Season Winner
Branden Khou	29	Financial client manager	Season Runner-Up
Matt Perillo-Phipps	44	Emergency nurse	Season Runner-Up
Negin Yaghmaie	30	MRI scientist	Eliminated (Episode 9)
Anita Birdi	54	Medical receptionist	Eliminated (Episode 8)
Glenn Jones	51	IT project manager	Eliminated (Episode 7)
Lucy Barnes	44	Bookkeeper	Eliminated (Episode 6)
Nick Cerchiara	30	Warehouse manager	Eliminated (Episode 5)
Sherrett Bone	42	Finance officer	Eliminated (Episode 4)
Jacob Amarant	33	Marketing lead	Eliminated (Episode 3)
Melanie Clements	62	Jewellery sales manager	Eliminated (Episode 2)
Peter Kennedy-Gane	60	Retired alpaca farmer	Eliminated (Episode 1)

{| class="wikitable" style="text-align:center"

|- ! colspan=11| Elimination Chart |- ! Baker ! 1 ! 2 ! 3 ! 4 ! 5 ! 6 ! 7 ! 8 ! 9 ! 10 |- ! Pamela | style="background:LemonChiffon;"|SB || colspan="4" style="background:LightBlue;"| || style="background:CornflowerBlue;"| || style="background:LemonChiffon;"|SB || style="background:CornflowerBlue;"| || style="background:LightBlue;"| || style="background:Gold;"| WINNER |- ! Branden | colspan="3" style="background:LightBlue;"| || style="background:LemonChiffon;"|SB || style="background:Plum;"| || style="background:LightBlue;"| || colspan="3" style="background:CornflowerBlue;"| || style="background:LimeGreen;"| Runner-Up |- ! Matt | colspan="3" style="background:LightBlue;"| || colspan="2" style="background:CornflowerBlue;"| || style="background:LemonChiffon;"|SB || colspan="2" style="background:Plum;"| || style="background:LemonChiffon;"|SB || style="background:LimeGreen;"| Runner-Up |- ! Negin | colspan="2" style="background:CornflowerBlue;"| || style="background:LemonChiffon;"|SB || style="background:LightBlue;"| || style="background:CornflowerBlue;"| || colspan="2" style="background:LightBlue;"| || style="background:LemonChiffon;"|SB || style="background:OrangeRed;"|OUT || colspan="9" style="background:DarkGrey;"| |- ! Anita | style="background:LightBlue;"| || style="background:CornflowerBlue;"| || style="background:LightBlue;"| || style="background:CornflowerBlue;"| || style="background:LemonChiffon;"|SB || style="background:LightBlue;"| || style="background:CornflowerBlue;"| || style="background:OrangeRed;"|OUT || colspan="9" style="background:DarkGrey;"| |- ! Glenn | colspan="2" style="background:LightBlue;"| || style="background:CornflowerBlue;"| || style="background:LightBlue;"| || colspan="2" style="background:Plum;"| || style="background:OrangeRed;"|OUT || colspan="9" style="background:DarkGrey;"| |- ! Lucy | colspan="2" style="background:LightBlue;"| || colspan="2" style="background:Plum;"| || style="background:LightBlue;"| || style="background:OrangeRed;"|OUT || colspan="9" style="background:DarkGrey;"| |- ! Nick | style="background:Plum;"| || style="background:LemonChiffon;"|SB || colspan="2" style="background:Plum;"| || style="background:OrangeRed;"|OUT || colspan="9" style="background:DarkGrey;"| |- ! Sherrett | colspan="2" style="background:LightBlue;"| || style="background:CornflowerBlue;"| || style="background:OrangeRed;"|OUT || colspan="9" style="background:DarkGrey;"| |- ! Jacob | colspan="2" style="background:Plum;"| || style="background:OrangeRed;"|OUT || colspan="9" style="background:DarkGrey;"| |- ! Melanie | style="background:LightBlue;"| || style="background:OrangeRed;"|OUT || colspan="9" style="background:DarkGrey;"| |- ! Peter | style="background:OrangeRed;"|OUT || colspan="9" style="background:DarkGrey;"| |- |}

== Ratings ==
Season	Network	Episodes	Premiere			Finale			Average viewers	Average rank	Ref
Season	Network	Episodes	Date	Ratings	Rank	Date	Ratings	Rank	Average viewers	Average rank	Ref
1	Nine Network	8	9 July 2013	1,119,000	#5	27 August 2013	760,000	#13	834,000	#12	
2	Lifestyle Food	10	13 October 2015	104,000	#1	15 December 2015	136,000	#1	108,000	#1	
3	Lifestyle Food	10	11 October 2016	96,000	#3	13 December 2016	140,000	#1	108,000	#2	
4	LifeStyle	10	18 January 2018	103,000	#1	22 March 2018	162,000	#3	106,000	#2	
5	LifeStyle	10	3 October 2019	110,000	#1	5 December 2019	95,000	#1	95,000	#1	
6	LifeStyle	10	27 January 2022	73,000	#1	31 March 2022	62,000	#5	62,000	#3	
7	LifeStyle	10	13 June 2023	50,000	#3	15 August 2023	47,000	#3	51,000	#2	
8	LifeStyle	10	18 September 2024	—N/a		20 November 2024	—N/a				

== Broadcast ==
Season	Network	Originally aired		Episodes
Season	Network	Premiere	Finale	Episodes
1	Nine Network	9 July 2013	27 August 2013	8
2	LifeStyle Food	13 October 2015	15 December 2015	10
3	LifeStyle Food	11 October 2016	13 December 2016	10
4	LifeStyle	18 January 2018	22 March 2018	10
5	LifeStyle	3 October 2019	5 December 2019	10
6	LifeStyle	27 January 2022	31 March 2022	10
7	LifeStyle	13 June 2023	15 August 2023	10
8	LifeStyle	18 September 2024	20 November 2024	10
9	LifeStyle	29 July 2025	30 September 2025	10
