= The Great Australian Bake Off season 8 =

Season of a television series

The Great Australian Bake Off
- Season 8
- Starring: Cal Wilson; Natalie Tran; Darren Purchese; Rachel Khoo
- No. of episodes: 10

Release
- Original network: LifeStyle
- Original release: 18 September – 20 November 2024

Season chronology
- ← Previous; Season 7 Next → Season 9

The eighth season of The Great Australian Bake Off premiered on 18 September 2024 on the LifeStyle channel, and saw 12 home bakers take part in a bake-off to test their baking skills as they battled to be crowned The Great Australian Bake Off's best amateur baker. The season consisted of 10 episodes. Each episode saw bakers put through three challenges, with each episode having its own theme or discipline. The season was hosted by Cal Wilson (in her final hosting role) and Natalie Tran, and was judged by Darren Purchese and Rachel Khoo.

== Production ==
The eighth season, filmed earlier in 2023, aired in 2024 and was the second and final appearance of Cal Wilson as host as she died in October 2023. The eighth season premiered on 18 September 2024 and honoured Cal Wilson.

== The Bakers ==
The following is the list of the bakers that competed this season:

Baker	Age	Occupation	Hometown	Competition Status
Arvin Garcia	36	Nurse	VIC	Season Winner
Dimi Jayawardene	40	Early Childhood Teacher	NSW	Season Runner-Up
Elliot Styche	34	Singing Teacher	NSW	Season Runner-Up
Laurina Bowlen	36	50s Dress Designer	QLD	Eliminated (Episode 9)
Adrian Barila	28	Theatre Performer	VIC	Eliminated (Episode 8)
Molly Cameron	16	School Student	NSW	Eliminated (Episode 7)
Melisa Chilimanzi	30	Digital Manager	NSW	Eliminated (Episode 6)
Jason Verner	34	Bartender	WA	Eliminated (Episode 5)
Jaden Briggs	30	K'gari Tour Guide	QLD	Eliminated (Episode 4)
Ryan Fielder	29	Learning Co-ordinator	VIC	Eliminated (Episode 4)
Vicki Priest	43	Government Officer	NSW	Eliminated (Episode 2)
Jill Carnovale	70	Retired	NSW	Eliminated (Episode 1)

== Results summary ==
Elimination Chart
Baker	1	2	3	4	5	6	7	8	9	10
Arvin				SB				SB		WINNER
Dimi						SB				Runner-Up
Elliot							SB		SB	Runner-Up
Laurina									OUT	
Adrian			SB					OUT		
Molly	SB						OUT			
Melisa					SB	OUT				
Jason		SB			OUT					
Jaden				OUT						
Ryan				OUT						
Vicki		OUT								
Jill	OUT									

Colour key:

Got through to the next round	Awarded Star Baker	Season winner
One of the judges' favourite bakers that week	The baker was eliminated
One of the judges' least favourite bakers that week	Season runner-up

== Episodes ==
The baker was eliminated	Awarded Star Baker	Season winner

=== Episode 1: Cake Week ===
Airdate: 18 September 2024

Baker	Signature (Pull-Apart Cakes)	Technical (Passionfruit Chiffon Cake)	Showstopper (Epic Birthday Cake)
Adrian	Paint Palette	1st	Disco Shag Cake
Arvin	Kamayan Feast	2nd	Journey of Discovery
Dimi	Field of Flowers	7th	Macaron Tower
Elliot	Treble Clef	6th	Vintage Pistachio Cake
Jaden	Long-Necked Turtle	12th	Desert Dreaming
Jason	Moonlit Galaxy	3rd	Two Countries
Jill	Hot Pink Flamingo	5th	Pina Colada Cake
Laurina	Retro Caravan	11th	Fancactus Cake
Melisa	Hair	8th	Indlovu Cake
Molly	Blooming Heart	4th	Mocrackle Cake
Ryan	Chai Shark	10th	Donut Explosion
Vicki	Mermaid Tail	9th	Razzle Dazzle Cake

=== Episode 2: Bread Week ===
Airdate: 25 September 2024

Baker	Signature (Bread sticks)	Technical (Zopf)	Showstopper (Scored & Painted Loaves)
Adrian	Grissini Braids	2nd	Written in the Stars
Arvin	Garlic & Onion Breadsticks	10th	Parol Loaves
Dimi	Corianda & Sea Salt Grissini	9th	Mexican Fiesta
Elliot	In the Middle East	6th	Picnic at the Farm
Jaden	Saltbush & Native Thyme Breadsticks	3rd	Bush Style Damper
Jason	Carry Me Away Grissini	11th	Jalapeno, Cheese and Corn Loaves
Laurina	Picnic Munchies	7th	Garden Loaves
Melisa	Baobab Breadsticks	1st	Let's Get In Formation Loaves
Molly	Prosciutto Cheese Twists	4th	Mandalas
Ryan	Mexican Fiesta Grissini	8th	Day of the Dead Bread
Vicki	Garlic Breadsticks	5th	For the Bees Loaves

=== Episode 3: Back to Basics Week ===
Airdate: 2 October 2024

Baker	Signature (Scones)	Technical (Chocolate Tart)	Showstopper (Vertical Pie)
Adrian	Pineapple & Rosemary Hawaiian Scones	1st	Apple Pie Camp Fire
Arvin	Coconut Bibingka Scones	2nd	Poached Pear Bayanihan
Dimi	Pumpkin & Ginger Scones	7th	Three Pork Pies
Elliot	Maple Pecan Scones	3rd	Pork Central Station
Jaden	Davidson Plum Scones	9th	Peach & Quandong Bark Hut
Jason	Candied Ginger Scones	8th	Chicken Curry Lotus Pond
Laurina	Lavender & Lemon Scones	6th	Mixed Berry & Mango Carousel
Melisa	Blabaer Scones	10th	Matcha Chocolate Pecan Ruin
Molly	Sticky Date Scones	5th	Blood Orange Pot of Gold
Ryan	Peach Melba Scones	4th	Mince Pie Christmas Tree

- No-one was eliminated in this episode, due to Laurina experiencing an electrical fault in the showstopper. Two will be eliminated in the next episode.

=== Episode 4: Biscuit Week ===
Airdate: 9 October 2024

Baker	Signature (Linzer Cookies)	Technical (Mocha Mochi Cookies)	Showstopper (Moving Biscuit Vehicle)
Adrian	Cosmo	3rd	Go Go Skates
Arvin	Pan de San Nicolas	2nd	Kalesa
Dimi	Traditional Linzers	6th	African Safari Truck
Elliot	A Biscuit a Day	5th	If the Boat's Rockin' Don't Come Knockin'
Jaden	Walkabout	10th	Bark Canoe
Jason	Pistachio Cardamom	9th	UFO
Laurina	Christmas in a Cookie	8th	London Sightseeing Bus
Melisa	Strawberry Daiquiri	1st	Viking Ship
Molly	Red & Green Shall Be Seen	4th	Pink Bisc-Ute
Ryan	Cherry Apple	7th	Taco 'Bout A Food Truck

=== Episode 5: Celebration Week ===
Airdate: 16 October 2024

Baker	Signature (Sarawak)	Technical (Christmas Ornaments)	Showstopper (Spooky Blacklight Cake)
Adrian	Coconut and Rum Sarawak	1st	Scary Go Round
Arvin	Orange Sarawak	6th	Tiyanak
Dimi	Citrus Sarawak	5th	Spooky Spider Cake
Elliot	Chocolate Orange Sarawak	7th	Pumpkin Patch Cake
Jason	Raspberry and Lime Sarawak	8th	Voodoo Altar
Laurina	Temple Sarawak	3rd	Death by Chocolate
Melisa	Kente Sarawak	4th	African Face Mask
Molly	Pineapple Sarawak	2nd	Tombstone Terror

- The episode marks the final appearance of Wilson hosting the show until her death before the next five episodes. Tran continued hosting the following challenges in each episode, alongside Khoo and Purchese.

=== Episode 6: Cheese Week ===
Airdate: 23 October 2024

Baker	Signature (Cheesy Tear & Share)	Technical (Three Cheese Pie)	Showstopper (Floating Cheesecake)
Adrian	Cheesy Truffle Loaf	2nd	Cheesecake Orbit
Arvin	Cheesy Ensaymada Rolls	5th	Matcha Made in Heaven
Dimi	Cheese, Spinach, and Bacon Wreath	3rd	Fruity Fix
Elliot	Party Pesto Knots	1st	Trip to France
Laurina	Spicy Cheesy Twists	6th	All Berry Bliss
Melisa	Cheesy Herb Scrolls	7th	Cosmopolitan Cheesecakes
Molly	Blackberry Ricotta Scrolls	4th	Tea vs Coffee

=== Episode 7: Spice Week ===
Airdate: 30 October 2024

Baker	Signature (Spiced Filo Pasties)	Technical (Crullers)	Showstopper (3D Biscuit Structures)
Adrian	Korean Pastries	1st	Pepperkoker Melbourne Tram
Arvin	Filipino Pastries	5th	Flinders Street Station
Dimi	Sri Lankan Pastries	4th	Irish Castle
Elliot	Thai Pastries	3rd	Piano and Dancefloor
Laurina	Hand Stretched Pastries	6th	Fairy Tree House
Molly	Family Favourites	2nd	Honey Bee Hotel

=== Episode 8: Italian Week ===
Airdate: 6 November 2024

Baker	Signature (Pizza)	Technical (Pesche Con Crema)	Showstopper (Tiramisu)
Adrian	Springtime Pizza	2nd	Tiramichoux Lamp
Arvin	Longanissa Pizza	4th	Tiramisu Spheres
Dimi	Pear and Gorgonzola Pizza	1st	Meringue-isu
Elliot	Pineapple on a Pizza	5th	Brownie-misu
Laurina	Canadian Bacon Pizza	3rd	Berrimisu Pastry Tower

=== Episode 9: Patisserie Week ===
Airdate: 13 November 2024

Baker	Signature (Kouign-amann)	Technical (Strawberry Tart)	Showstopper (Petit Fours)
Arvin	Lemon Myrtle Kouign-amann	1st	Petit Collection
Dimi	Spiced Orange Kouign-amann	4th	Black Sesame Petit Fours
Elliot	Breakfast Kouign-amann	3rd	"Petite" Fours
Laurina	Lemon and Cardamom Kouign-amann	2nd	Colorful Petit Fours

=== Episode 10: Finale ===
Baker	Signature (Botanical Cake)	Technical (Paris-Brest)	Showstopper (Free Choice)
Arvin	Rainforest Cake	3rd	Rising Phoenix
Dimi	Earl Grey & Lavender Cake	1st	"From Seed to Bloom"
Elliot	Haven for Wildlife	2nd	Bake Off Family Tree
