= Demi Lardner =

Australian comedian

- Born: South Australia, Australia
- Occupation: Comedian
- Years active: 2010–present
- Spouse: Tom Walker

Twitch information
- Channel: demilardner
- Genres: Gaming, comedy
- Followers: 10.3 thousand

Demi Pizza (Note: She changed her middle name from Rose to Pizza because her grandmother, named Rose, was "a real cunt.") Lardner (born Demi Rose Lardner) is an Australian comedian and Twitch streamer. In 2013, she won Raw Comedy in Melbourne and went on to win So You Think You're Funny? in Edinburgh for her comedy set. She is a winner of three Melbourne International Comedy Festival awards and a Sydney Comedy Festival Director's Choice award. She regularly streams on Twitch, and co-hosts the podcast bigsofttitty.png with her husband Tom Walker.

== Early life ==
Lardner grew up in Adelaide, South Australia.

== Career ==
Lardner began performing in Adelaide at open mics at 15, and won Adelaide Comedy's Rising Starr Award for Best Newcomer in 2010. In 2013, she won the Raw Comedy national competition and earned a place in that year's So You Think You're Funny? competition at Edinburgh Festival Fringe, which she won in a tie. Lardner co-wrote and performed in Wolf Creek, The Musical, which won BankSA's Best Emerging Comedy Show Award at Adelaide Fringe. That year she also won Adelaide Comedy's Out of Adelaide award and was nominated for their Adelaide Comedian of the Year award.

Lardner's comedy has been described as surreal and absurdist. She performed in Limbless Cagefighter in 2014, and was nominated for Adelaide Comedy's Adelaide Comedian of the Year and Out of Adelaide awards.

In 2015 she performed in her first solo show Birds with Human Lips, as well as in Angus and Demi are: Best Good Show with Angus Brown. She also began the podcast We Are Not Doctors with Bart Freebairn in 2015, which ended after its 100th episode in 2017.

Lardner's 2016 solo show Life Mechanic led to her receiving the Sydney Comedy Festival's Best Newcomer Award as joint winner and being nominated for Melbourne International Comedy Festival's Best Newcomer award. Her 2017 show Look What You Made Me Do, directed and co-written by Mark Bonanno, received the Directors' Choice award at the Melbourne International Comedy Festival and the Underbelly Edinburgh Award at Adelaide Fringe.

In 2018 Lardner's show I Love Skeleton won the Pinder Prize at Melbourne International Comedy Festival. She also began the podcast bigsofttitty.png with Tom Walker, which was picked up by Sanspants Radio Podcast Network later that year.

Her 2019 solo show Ditch Witch 800 won Best International Show at the New Zealand International Comedy Festival, and was nominated for Edinburgh Fringe's Best Show and for Edinburgh Comedy Awards' Best Comedy Show. In 2026, Mark Muldoon of British Comedy Guide placed the show 8th in a list of the 100 best live comedy shows of the past decade. Also in 2019, Lardner performed alongside Tom Walker in We Mustn't, which received Sydney Comedy Festival's Director's Choice Award.

Lardner has collaborated with comedy group Aunty Donna.

While she had previously occasionally streamed on Twitch, Lardner began to stream regularly in 2020, when COVID-19 restrictions were preventing live shows.

Lardner was one of a cast of voice actors in the Australian science fiction comedy feature film Lesbian Space Princess, which premiered at the Adelaide Film Festival in October 2024.

== Personal life ==
Lardner is openly bisexual. She has been involved in LGBT+ awareness initiatives, such as a Triple J interview about her parents' responses when she came out to them, and creating a satirical public service announcement in October 2018, addressing recent national debate about the rights of religious schools regarding LGBT+ employees and students.

She is married to her comedic partner Tom Walker.
