= The Great Australian Bake Off season 5 =

Season of a television series

The Great Australian Bake Off
- Season 5
- Starring: Claire Hooper; Mel Buttle; Maggie Beer; Matt Moran
- No. of episodes: 10

Release
- Original network: LifeStyle
- Original release: 3 October – 5 December 2019

Season chronology
- ← Previous; Season 4 Next → Season 6

The fifth season of The Great Australian Bake Off premiered on 3 October 2019 on the LifeStyle channel, and saw 12 home bakers take part in a bake-off to test their baking skills as they battled to be crowned The Great Australian Bake Off's best amateur baker. The season consisted of 10 episodes. Each episode saw bakers put through three challenges, with each episode having its own theme or discipline. The season aired from 3 October 2019 until 5 December 2019, and saw Subha Nasir Ahmad win. The season was hosted by Claire Hooper and Mel Buttle, and was judged by Maggie Beer and Matt Moran.

== The Bakers ==
The following is the list of the bakers that competed this season:

Baker	Age	Occupation	Hometown	Competition Status
Subha "Sunny" Nasir Ahmad	26	PHD Science Student	Sydney, New South Wales	Season Winner
Daniel "Dan" Pasquali	35	Research Scientist	Brisbane, Queensland	Season Runner-Up
David Hills	41	Project Manager	Melbourne, Victoria	Season Runner-Up
Donald "Don" Hackett	55	Superannuation Consultant	Sydney, New South Wales	Eliminated (Episode 9)
Angela Navacchi	36	Housewife	Adelaide, South Australia	Eliminated (Episode 8)
Wynn Visser	36	Disability Services Manager	Sydney, New South Wales	Eliminated (Episode 7)
Anston Ratnayake	28	Student Voice Officer	Sydney, New South Wales	Eliminated (Episode 6)
Sue Dahman	70	Retired Bank Manager	Sydney, New South Wales	Eliminated (Episode 4)
Laura Peters	22	Cafe Manager	New South Wales	Left (Episode 3)
Dennis Mews	71	Retired Maths Teacher	Melbourne, Victoria	Eliminated (Episode 3)
Annette Peffers	48	Account Manager	Gold Coast, Queensland	Eliminated (Episode 2)
Zee Scott	39	Marriage Celebrant	Melbourne, Victoria	Eliminated (Episode 1)

== Results summary ==
Elimination Chart
Baker	1	2	3	4	5	6	7	8	9	10
Sunny				SB				SB		WINNER
Dan						SB				Runner-Up
David		SB					SB			Runner-Up
Don					SB				OUT	
Angela	SB							OUT		
Wynn			SB				OUT			
Anston						OUT				
Sue				OUT						
Laura			LEFT							
Dennis			OUT							
Annette		OUT								
Zee	OUT									

Colour key:

Got through to the next round	Awarded Star Baker	Season winner
One of the judges' favourite bakers that week	The baker was eliminated	Left the competition
One of the judges' least favourite bakers that week	Season runner-up

== Episodes ==
The baker was eliminated	Awarded Star Baker	Season winner

=== Episode 1: Cakes ===
Baker	Signature (Family Sized Butter Cake)	Technical (12 Raffa Cakes)	Showstopper (Ultimate Illusion Cake)
Don	Lime & Coconut Butter Cake	12th	Antique Porcelain Vase Cake
Annette	Strawberry & Matcha Butter Cake	10th	Sea Turtle Cake
Laura	Chocolate & Orange Butter Cake	11th	Wooden Planter Box Cake
Wynn	Lime & Coconut Butter Cake	2nd	Pterodactyl Cake
Zee	Vanilla Butter Cake	4th	Beach Cake
Sunny	Lemon Scented Butter Cake	1st	Concrete Succulent Box Cake
Anston	Arabic Spiced Butter Cake	6th	Weight Set Cake
Sue	Carrot Butter Cake	8th	Chicken Cake
David	Apple Butter Cake	3rd	Over the Moon Cake
Angela	Spiced Apple Pie Butter Cake	5th	Pancake Stack Cake
Dan	Sicilian Cassata Butter Cake	7th	Tree Stump Cake
Dennis	Rhubarb & Ginger Butter Cake	9th	Cheese Illusion Cake

=== Episode 2: Bread ===
Baker	Signature (Scrolls)	Technical (Rye and Beetroot Bread)	Showstopper (24 Soft Pretzels - 12 sweet & 12 savoury)
Angela	Cinnamon Scrolls	3rd	Sweet – Cinnamon Sugar and Dark Chocolate; Savoury – Parmesan, Rosemary and Garlic
Annette	Adult Cinnamon Scrolls	6th	Sweet – Cinnamon and Ginger; Savoury – Chilli, Cheese and Dark Chocolate
Anston	Pork, Rhubarb and Caramelised Onion Scrolls	2nd	Sweet – Marshmallow Fluff and Dark Chocolate; Savoury – Brie and Camembert
Dan	Italian Scrolls	4th	Sweet – Cannoli Inspired Pretzels; Savoury – Squid Ink and Fig
David	Savoury Scrolls	1st	Sweet – Banana and Caramel; Savoury – Garlic and Parmesan
Dennis	Chelsea Bun Scrolls	10th	Sweet – Orange and Poppyseed; Savoury – Mozzarella and Bacon
Don	French Scrolls	5th	Sweet – Raspberry Pretzels; Savoury – German Pretzels
Laura	Rum, Raisin and Pecan Scrolls	7th	Sweet – Orange and Almond; Savoury – Pistachio Pesto, Mozzarella and Ricotta
Sunny	Za’atar Scrolls	9th	Sweet – Orange and Cardamom; Savoury – Garlic Naan Pretzels
Sue	Lebanese Scrolls	8th	Sweet – Date, Cardamom and Aniseed; Savoury – Sesame Seed and Molasses
Wynn	Cinnamon and Apple Scrolls	11th	Sweet – Triple Chocolate; Savoury – Biltong Pretzels

=== Episode 3: Biscuits ===
Baker	Signature (Chocolate Biscuits)	Technical (Chocolate and Ginger Arlettes)	Showstopper (Biscuit Box filled with 12 Biscuits)
Angela	Choc Chunk Cookies	8th	Chocolate Taco Truck with Chocolate Tacos
Anston	Choc Chip Peanut Cookies	1st	Christmas Cookie House with Peanut Butter Cookies
Dan	American Choco-smores	3rd	Gingerbread Treasure Chest with Canestrelli Biscuits
David	Dark Chocolate MeltinG Moments	7th	Gingerbread Checkerboard with Chocolate and Vanilla Macarons
Dennis	Chocolate Orange Shortbread	10th	Gingerbread Checkerboard with Almond and Lemon & Cranberry and Vanilla Biscuits
Don	Dark Chocolate Sable Biscuits	4th	Gingerbread Jewellery Box with Butter Biscuits
Laura	Dark Chocolate Melting Moments	5th	Gingerbread Biscuit Tower with Dairy-Free Lemon Butter Cookies.
Sunny	Miso Chocolate Chunk Cookies	6th	Spiced Biscuit Crocodile Skin Suitcase with Lemon Myrtle Biscuits
Sue	Chocolate Graybeh	9th	Arabic Biscuit Basket with Ma'amoul, Orange Biscotti and two types of Kaak Biscuits
Wynn	White Chocolate Shortbread	2nd	Vanilla Sugar Biscuit Matchbox with Roobois Tea Matchsticks

=== Episode 4: Vegan ===
Baker	Signature (Layered Slices)	Technical (Vegan Terrine)	Showstopper (48 Vegan Cupcakes)
Angela	Matcha & Raspberry Slice	8th	Chocolate Cupcakes and Vanilla Cupcakes
Anston	Black Forest Slice	1st	Dark Chocolate & Lavender Cupcakes and Vanilla & Vodka Cupcakes
Dan	Cherry Ripe Slice	5th	Chocolate Cupcakes and Vanilla Cupcakes
David	Peppermint Slice	3rd	Carrot Cupcakes and Red Velvet Cupcakes
Don	Chocolate Caramel Slice	7th	Chocolate Cupcakes and Vanilla Cupcakes
Sunny	Peanut Butter, Chocolate & Date Slice	2nd	Coconut Cupcakes and Chocolate & Raspberry Cupcakes
Sue	Ma'amoul Slice	4th	Turmeric Cupcakes and Red Velvet Cupcakes
Wynn	Chocolate & Raspberry Slice	6th	Ginger & Pear Cupcakes

=== Episode 5: Classics ===
Baker	Signature (Savoury Pastries)	Technical (Chocolate, Hazelnut and Orange Flan)	Showstopper (Botanical Chiffon Cake)
Angela	New Orleans Red Bean & Rice Pasties	7th	Rose, Orange Blossom and Lavender English Garden Chiffon Cake
Anston	Shepherd's Pie Pasties	4th	Lavender, Mandarin, Rosewater and Strawberry Chiffon Cake
Dan	Boscaiola Pasties	3rd	Lemon, Earl Grey, Lavender, Orange and Rosewater Chiffon Cake
David	Lamb Pasties	2nd	Juniper Berry, Vanilla, Orange Blossom and Cardamom Chiffon Cake
Don	French Chestnut Pasties	1st	Sakura Cherry Blossom and Japanese Chiffon Cake
Sunny	Vegetarian Samosas	5th	Bay Leaf, Kumquat, Fennel and Lemon Chiffon Cake
Wynn	Beef & Mushroom Pasties	6th	Blackberry and Lemon Chiffon Cake

=== Episode 6: Patisserie ===
Baker	Signature (Cream Horns)	Technical (Canelés)	Showstopper (Crafty Fruit Tarts)
Angela	Peanut Butter & Strawberry Jam	2nd	Bumbleberry Fruit Tart
Anston	Coconut Mousse, Mango & Longan	6th	Apple & Rhubarb Tart
Dan	Macadamia & Vanilla	7th	Apple & Date Fruit Tart
David	Date & Orange	5th	Pear & Walnut Tart
Don	Mandarin & Cardamom Curd	3rd	French Apple Tart
Sunny	Kaffir Lime	1st	Frangipane Tart
Wynn	Cheesecake & Strawberry Jam	4th	Strawberry & Coconut Tart

=== Episode 7: Spice ===
Baker	Signature (Savoury Pides)	Technical (Ma'amoul)	Showstopper (Baklava Tower)
Angela	Vegetarian Pides	3rd	Palm Baklava Tree
Dan	Italian Pide	6th	Christmas Baklava Tree
David	Pumpkin & Caramelised Onion Pides	5th	Military Baklava Fort
Don	Four Cheese Pide	2nd	Baklava Colosseum
Sunny	Sujuk & Capsicum Pide	1st	Jenga Baklava Tower
Wynn	Spiced Lamb Pides	4th	Spiral Baklava Tower

=== Episode 8: Hybrid ===
Baker	Signature (Chounuts)	Technical (Prosciutto & Gorgonzola Cruffins)	Showstopper (Biscuit Cakes)
Angela	Raspberry & Vanilla Chounuts	4th	Queen of Hearts Biscuit Cake
Dan	Passionfruit Chounuts	2nd	Plane Lemon Biscuit Cake
David	Apple & Hazelnut Chounuts	1st	H for Harper Butter Biscuit Cake
Don	Marshmallow & Blueberry Chounuts	5th	Cars & Cakes Biscuit Cake
Sunny	Passionfruit & Chocolate Chounuts	3rd	4 You Biscuit Cake

=== Episode 9: Party ===
Baker	Signature (24 Savoury Pastry Canapés)	Technical (Sicilian Cassata Cake)	Showstopper (20 Entremets)
Dan	Mushroom and Truffle Choux Buns & Mussel and Spinach Vol Au Vents	1st	Mojito Entremets & Tropical Sunset Entremets
David	Chicken, Mushroom and Leek Vol Au Vents & Mini Beef Wellington	4th	Carrot Cake Entremets & Triple Chocolate Opera Cake Entremets
Don	Mini Escargot Tarts & Duck a l’Orange Vol Au Vents	3rd	Mango Entremets & Chocolate Entremets
Sunny	Mini Tuna Tartare Cones & Smoky Baba Ganoush Vol Au Vents	2nd	Berry Opera Cake Entremets & Chocolate and Ginger Entremets

=== Episode 10: Finale ===
Baker	Signature (Dobos Torte)	Technical (Mont Blancs)	Showstopper (Geometric Cake)
Dan	Let's Celebrate Dobos Torte	2nd	White Chocolate & Apple Geometric Cake
David	Chocolate & Peppermint Dobos Torte	3rd	White Chocolate, Raspberry and Salted Caramel Geometric Cake
Sunny	Chocolate & Orange Dobos Torte	1st	Vanilla, White Chocolate & Raspberry Geometric Cake

== Ratings ==
No.	Title	Air date	Overnight ratings		Ref(s)
No.	Title	Air date	Viewers	Rank	Ref(s)
1	"Cakes"	3 October 2019	110,000	1	
2	"Bread"	10 October 2019	81,000	1	
3	"Biscuits"	17 October 2019	88,000	1	
4	"Vegan"	24 October 2019	85,000	1	
5	"Classics"	31 October 2019	106,000	1	
6	"Patisserie"	7 November 2019	97,000	1	
7	"Spice"	14 November 2019	89,000	1	
8	"Hybrid"	21 November 2019	108,000	4	
9	"Party"	28 November 2019	95,000	1	
10	"Finale"	5 December 2019	95,000	1	
