= The Great Australian Bake Off season 7 =

Season of a television series

The Great Australian Bake Off
- Season 7
- Starring: Cal Wilson; Natalie Tran; Darren Purchese; Rachel Khoo
- No. of episodes: 10

Release
- Original network: LifeStyle
- Original release: 13 June – 15 August 2023

Season chronology
- ← Previous; Season 6 Next → Season 8

The seventh season of The Great Australian Bake Off premiered on 13 June 2023 on the LifeStyle channel, and saw 12 home bakers take part in a bake-off to test their baking skills as they battled to be crowned The Great Australian Bake Off's best amateur baker. The season consisted of 10 episodes. Each episode saw bakers put through three challenges, with each episode having its own theme or discipline. The season aired from 13 June 2023 until 15 August 2023, and saw Laura Foo win. The season was hosted by Cal Wilson and Natalie Tran, and was judged by Darren Purchese and Rachel Khoo.

== Production ==
On 4 August 2022, Foxtel announced a new-look seventh season had been commissioned, to air in 2023 with filming commencing in September. Maggie Beer, Matt Moran, Claire Hooper and Mel Buttle are departing the show, with new judges and hosts to be announced. On 30 August 2022 Foxtel revealed pastry chef Darren Purchese and culinary expert Rachel Khoo as the show's new judges, with comedians Cal Wilson and Natalie Tran to host. It was announced the seventh season would premiere on 13 June 2023. In May 2023, it was announced Maggie Beer will make a guest appearance in the seventh season. Maggie Beer appeared in the final episode as a guest judge, and assigned the technical challenge.

== The Bakers ==
The following is the list of the bakers that competed this season:

Baker	Age	Occupation	Hometown	Competition Status
Laura Foo	26	Management Consultant	VIC	Season Winner
Adam Miller	37	Communications Manager	VIC	Season Runner-Up
Ilona Nicola	41	Health Policy Advisor	VIC	Season Runner-Up
Sandra Walter	59	Manager	QLD	Eliminated (Episode 9)
Neil Higgins	42	Scale Technician	WA	Eliminated (Episode 8)
Reem El Daouk	20	Student	VIC	Eliminated (Episode 7)
Galya Dissanayake	34	Channel Marketer	NSW	Eliminated (Episode 6)
Gavin Turner	58	Team Leader	QLD	Eliminated (Episode 5)
Felicity Dobson	38	Learning And Development Manager	WA	Eliminated (Episode 4)
Laurent La	37	Sales Assistant	QLD	Eliminated (Episode 3)
Natalie Levy	41	Self-Employed	NSW	Eliminated (Episode 2)
Guillermo Urra	41	Flight Attendant	VIC	Eliminated (Episode 1)

== Results summary ==
Elimination Chart
Baker	1	2	3	4	5	6	7	8	9	10
Laura				SB				SB		WINNER
Adam						SB			SB	Runner-Up
Ilona	SB				SB					Runner-Up
Sandra							SB		OUT	
Neil			SB					OUT		
Reem							OUT			
Galya						OUT				
Gavin					OUT					
Felicity		SB		OUT						
Laurent			OUT							
Natalie		OUT								
Guillermo	OUT									

Colour key:

Got through to the next round	Awarded Star Baker	Season winner
One of the judges' favourite bakers that week	The baker was eliminated
One of the judges' least favourite bakers that week	Season runner-up

== Episodes ==
The baker was eliminated	Awarded Star Baker	Season winner

=== Episode 1: Cake Week ===
Baker	Signature ("Your Personal Story" Cake)	Technical (Raspberry and Pepper Dome Cake)	Showstopper (Two-Tiered "Show-Off-Stopper" Cake)
Adam	Chocolate Miso	1st	Earth to Sky Cake
Felicity	Coffee Mandarin Coffee	3rd	Orange Hot Milk Cake
Gavin	Chocolate Sponge	12th	Gav's Big Party Cake
Galya	Chocolate and Orange	9th	Bridal Bouquet Cake
Guillermo	Walnut and Spice	11th	Dinosaur Cake
Ilona	Pineapple and Cherry	8th	Memories of Persia Cake
Laura	Singapore Sponge	6th	Cake for Breakfast
Laurent	Apple	10th	Durian Cake
Natalie	Hazelnut Macaroon	5th	Celebration Cake
Neil	Wedding Cake	2nd	Raspberry Cake
Reem	Rock Cake	4th	Mari Antoinette Cake
Sandra	Pumpkin and Walnut	7th	Summer Daisies Cake

=== Episode 2: Biscuit Week ===
Baker	Signature (12 Decorated Fondant Biscuits)	Technical (5 Explosive Chocolate Wheels)	Showstopper (Biscuit Board Game)
Adam	Trip to the Netherlands	7th	A Baker's Game of Life
Felicity	Peppermint Biscuits	1st	Carby, Carby Hippos
Gavin	Homegrown Biscuits	4th	Dartboard
Galya	Vintage Tea Party Biscuits	9th	Elephant Puzzle
Ilona	Bento Box Biscuits	3rd	Crate of Monkeys
Laura	Chocolate Mint Musical Notes	8th	Sek Wu
Laurent	Vanilla Shortbread	5th	Four in a Row
Natalie	Earl Grey and Lavender	10th	Backgammon
Neil	Vanilla Shortbread Butterflies Biscuits	6th	Nine Men's Morris
Reem	Marshmallow Fondant Biscuits	2nd	Cookie Operation
Sandra	Maple Sugar Biscuits	11th	Cribbage Board

=== Episode 3: Bread Week ===
Baker	Signature (Sweet Loaf)	Technical (Fougasse)	Showstopper (Bread Centerpiece)
Adam	Strawberry and Cinnamon Babka	3rd	Spelt Sun God
Felicity	Pecan Danish	4th	Cactus Pot
Gavin	Prune and Cranberry Loaf	8th	Gav's Big Knight
Galya	Orange Curd and Cinnamon Loaf	10th	Sri Lankan Devil Mask
Ilona	Baklava Babka	6th	Carby Curls
Laura	Cinnamon and Cardamom Loaf	2nd	Gone Walkin'
Laurent	Raspberry Brioche	9th	Hello, From Nice
Neil	Cinnamon and Sultana Loaf	1st	Bread of Roses
Reem	Wool-Spun Coconut Loaf	7th	70's Disco Ball
Sandra	Blueberry Pull-Apart Loaf	5th	All You Need Is Love

=== Episode 4: Winter Week ===
Baker	Signature (Savoury Pastries)	Technical (Carrot & Cumin Tart)	Showstopper (3D Art Decorative Pie)
Adam	Vol Au Vent and Curry Puffs	6th	Galactic Strawberry & Rhubarb Pie
Felicity	Breakfast Pastries	5th	Koi Pond
Gavin	Party Tarts	8th	Gav's Fishy Pie
Galya	Sambal Pastries	9th	Foxy Pie
Ilona	Cypriot Pastries	4th	Spicy Chickpea Pie
Laura	Pork Pastries	2nd	Winter in Oslo
Neil	Cheese Pastries	3rd	Apple and Blueberry Pie
Reem	Dad's Pastries	1st	Oh My Pie
Sandra	Sandra's Tarts	7th	Snowstorm Pie

=== Episode 5: Vintage Week ===
Baker	Signature (Profiteroles)	Technical (Beef Wellington)	Showstopper (Checkerboard Cake)
Adam	Strawberry & Liquorice Profiteroles	7th	Spicy Margarita Cake
Gavin	Chocolate Choux	2nd	Pyramid Cake
Galya	Passionfruit Profiteroles	4th	Vintage Flower Cake
Ilona	Black Forest Profiteroles	5th	Chocolate & Fennel Cake
Laura	Du The Sil Vou Plait Profiteroles	8th	Checkered Delight
Neil	Coffee Shop Choux	3rd	Party Cake
Reem	Dalgona Coffee Profiteroles	6th	Crochet Quilt Cake
Sandra	Canadian Cream Puffs	1st	Tropical Paradise Cake

=== Episode 6: Dessert Week ===
Baker	Signature (Family Favourite Dessert)	Technical (Opera Cake)	Showstopper (Ice Cream Cake Pop)
Adam	Chocolate Bavarian	1st	Movie Night Pops
Galya	Chocolate Biscuit Pudding	5th	Celebration Cones
Ilona	Chocolate Swiss Roll	2nd	Devilish Cake Pops
Laura	Grandmother's Tarts	4th	The Answer is Ice Cream
Neil	Sticky Date Cake	6th	Boozy Cake Pops
Reem	Ma'amoul Mad Bil Ashta	3rd	Catcream Cones
Sandra	Pumpkin Pie Trifle	7th	Waffle Cones

=== Episode 7: Citrus Week ===
Baker	Signature (Individual Citrus Tarts)	Technical (Gin & Tonic Roulade)	Showstopper (Citrus Meringue)
Adam	Lemon Cake Tarts	1st	Citrus & Meringue Inferno
Ilona	Lemon Palet Breton	2nd	Lemon & Coffee Meringue Tower
Laura	Lime & Gin Vertical Tarts	3rd	Croquembouche
Neil	World's Best Lemon Tarts	6th	Burnt Basque Mousse Cake
Reem	Finger Lime & Rosemary Tarts	5th	Ice Cream Opera Cake
Sandra	Blood Orange & Chipotle Tarts	4th	Mandarin Mojito Cake

=== Episode 8: International Week ===
Baker	Signature (Turkish İçli Pide)	Technical (Steamed Rainbow lapis)	Showstopper ("Jacked" Macaron Stack)
Adam	Chicken Shawarma & Spring Pide	4th	Chocolate, Orange & Negroni Pearl Stack
Ilona	Turkish & Cypriot Pide	2nd	Indian Voyage
Laura	World of Flavours	1st	Busy, Busy Honey Bees
Neil	Pide Two Ways	5th	Coffee, Chocolate & Pear Stak-er-on
Sandra	Garden Fresh Pide	3rd	Strawberry & Basil Macaron Stack

=== Episode 9: Chocolate Week ===
Baker	Signature (Decorated Chocolate Cake)	Technical (Tempered Chocolate Heart)	Showstopper (Individual Mirror Glaze Cakes)
Adam	Chocolate Ghost Cake	1st	Mirror Glaze Collection
Ilona	Chocolate, Hazelnut & Sour Cherry Cake	3rd	Mirror Glaze Collection
Laura	Black Forest Floor Cake	2nd	Mirror Glaze Collection
Sandra	Chocolate Caramel Bundt	4th	Mirror Glaze Collection

=== Episode 10: Finale ===
Baker	Signature (High Tea)	Technical (Terrine)	Showstopper (3D Illusion Cake)
Adam	High Tea	1st	Floral Vase
Ilona	Moreish High Tea	2nd	Still Life
Laura	"There's No Place Like Home" High Tea	3rd	Kopitiam

== Ratings ==
No.	Title	Air date	Overnight ratings		Ref(s)
No.	Title	Air date	Viewers	Rank	Ref(s)
1	"Cakes"	13 June 2023	50,000	3	
2	"Biscuits"	20 June 2023	54,000	1	
3	"Bread"	27 June 2023	45,000	9	
4	"Winter"	4 July 2023	44,000	4	
5	"Vintage"	11 July 2023	54,000	1	
6	"Dessert"	18 July 2023	59,000	2	
7	"Citrus"	25 July 2023	57,000	1	
8	"International"	1 August 2023	66,000	1	
9	"Chocolate"	8 August 2023	41,000	4	
10	"Finale"	15 August 2023	47,000	3	
