= The Great Australian Bake Off season 6 =

Season of a television series

The Great Australian Bake Off
- Season 6
- Starring: Claire Hooper; Mel Buttle; Maggie Beer; Matt Moran
- No. of episodes: 10

Release
- Original network: LifeStyle
- Original release: 27 January – 31 March 2022

Season chronology
- ← Previous; Season 5 Next → Season 7

The sixth season of The Great Australian Bake Off premiered on 27 January 2022 on the LifeStyle channel, and saw 12 home bakers take part in a bake-off to test their baking skills as they battled to be crowned The Great Australian Bake Off's best amateur baker. The season consisted of 10 episodes. Each episode saw bakers put through three challenges, with each episode having its own theme or discipline. The season aired from 27 January 2022 until 31 March 2022, and saw Ella Rossanis win. The season was hosted by Claire Hooper and Mel Buttle, and was judged by Maggie Beer and Matt Moran.

== Production ==
In December 2020, there was speculation the series was to be picked up by the Seven Network after the previous four seasons were aired on Foxtel's Lifestyle channels, however in March 2021, Foxtel was in “advanced discussions” for a series return. In June 2021, it was officially renewed by Foxtel with auditions open from June to 18 July 2021, with BBC Studios Australia taking over production from Fremantle Australia.

== The Bakers ==
The following is the list of the bakers that competed this season. Among the bakers is MasterChef Australia Season 1 contestant, Tom Mosby, who ranked in 9th place.

| Baker | Age | Occupation | Competition Status |
|---|---|---|---|
| Ella Rossanis | 35 | Creative Copywriter | Season Winner |
| Aaron Hawton | 31 | High School Teacher | Season Runner-Up |
| Nurman Noor | 35 | General Practitioner | Season Runner-Up |
| Hoda Alzubaidi | 28 | Publishing Sales | Eliminated (Episode 9) |
| Jawin Ratchawong | 27 | Public Servant | Eliminated (Episode 8) |
| Carmel Scassa | 48 | Document Controller | Eliminated (Episode 7) |
| Haydn Allbutt | 46 | Scientist & Stay-at-home Dad | Eliminated (Episode 6) |
| Ashley Callaghan | 30 | Retired Navy Veteran | Left (Episode 5) |
| Naveid 'Nav' Zarshoy | 32 | Recruitment Consultant | Eliminated (Episode 4) |
| Blessing Mudzikitiri | 19 | Disability Support Worker | Eliminated (Episode 3) |
| Tom Mosby | 52 | CEO | Eliminated (Episode 2) |
| Lidia Morosin | 62 | Retail Sales | Eliminated (Episode 1) |

== Results summary ==
Elimination Chart
| Baker | 1 | 2 | 3 | 4 | 5 | 6 | 7 | 8 | 9 | 10 |
|---|---|---|---|---|---|---|---|---|---|---|
| Ella | SB | | | | | | | SB | | WINNER |
| Aaron | | | | | SB | | | | | Runner-Up |
| Nurman | | SB | | | | | | | SB | Runner-Up |
| Hoda | | | | | | | SB | | OUT | |
| Jawin | | | | | | | | OUT | | |
| Carmel | | | | SB | | | OUT | | | |
| Haydn | | | SB | | | OUT | | | | |
| Ashley | | | | | LEFT | | | | | |
| Nav | | | | OUT | | | | | | |
| Blessing | | | OUT | | | | | | | |
| Tom | | OUT | | | | | | | | |
| Lidia | OUT | | | | | | | | | |

Colour key:

| Got through to the next round | Awarded Star Baker | Season winner |
| One of the judges' favourite bakers that week | The baker was eliminated |
| One of the judges' least favourite bakers that week | Season runner-up |

== Episodes ==
| The baker was eliminated | Awarded Star Baker | Season winner |

=== Episode 1: Cake Week ===
| Baker | Signature (Sponge cake) | Technical (Cotton Cheesecake) | Showstopper (Miniature World Cake) |
|---|---|---|---|
| Aaron | Pavlova Lamington Sponge | 1st | Scrum-ptious Rugby Mud Cake |
| Ashley | Tropical Sponge | 6th | Enchanted Fairy Book Cake |
| Blessing | Berry Sponge | 11th | Volcano World Cake |
| Carmel | Bunny Drizzle Sponge | 5th | Giant Carrot Cake |
| Ella | Princess Passionfruit Sponge | 7th | "Taboobs" Cake |
| Hoda | Persian Pistachio Sponge | 3rd | Top of the World Cake |
| Haydn | Blueberry Sponge | 10th | Musical Theatre Cake |
| Jawin | Sticky Rice Sponge | 12th | Strawberry Mountain Cake |
| Lidia | Vanilla Strawberry Sponge | 4th | Grandchildren Cake |
| Nav | Spiced Pumpkin Sponge | 8th | Chocolate Volcano Cake |
| Nurman | Pandan Sponge | 2nd | Waterfall Mountain Cake |
| Tom | Meringue Sponge | 9th | Torres Strait Cake |

=== Episode 2: Biscuit Week ===
| Baker | Signature (Slice & Bake Biscuits) | Technical (Alfajores) | Showstopper (Biscuit Chandelier) |
|---|---|---|---|
| Aaron | Chill Vibes Biscuits | 7th | Flower Power Gingerbread |
| Ashley | Dark Slice of the Moon Biscuits | 2nd | Hippie Chandelier |
| Blessing | Zesty Bee Biscuits | 6th | Cookie Africa |
| Carmel | Italian Spumoni Biscuits | 3rd | Christmas Tree |
| Ella | Poo Emoji Biscuits | 1st | Twinkle Twinkle Little Star Mobile |
| Hoda | Persian Ta'arof Biscuits | 5th | Light Your World |
| Haydn | Conical Flask Biscuits | 9th | Chocolate Biscuit Chandelier |
| Jawin | Perfect Matcha Biscuits | 8th | Hive Five |
| Nav | Afghanistan Flag Biscuits | 11th | Floral Ombre Spiral |
| Nurman | Coffee-Right Biscuits | 4th | Pocky Sticks |
| Tom | Game of Cards Biscuits | 10th | Memories of Home |

=== Episode 3: Bread Week ===
| Baker | Signature (Flavoured Bread Rolls) | Technical (Swedish Cinnamon & Cardamom Bread) | Showstopper (Gardenscape Focaccia) |
|---|---|---|---|
| Aaron | "Babka" Ganoush | 3rd | Sunflower Focaccia |
| Ashley | Tomato Pretzel Rolls | 9th | Garden Bed Focaccia |
| Blessing | Vegan Herb Twists | 6th | Rainbow Focaccia |
| Carmel | Olive & Feta Rolls | 7th | Antipasto Vase Focaccia |
| Ella | Za'tar Challah Rolls | 2nd | Magical Fairy Garden Focaccia |
| Hoda | Tsoureki Bread Rolls | 10th | Dill & Sea Salt Focaccia |
| Haydn | Cheesy Bread Rolls | 5th | Tryptic Harvest Fields Focaccia |
| Jawin | Laotion Sausage Rolls | 8th | Ode to Canberra Focaccia |
| Nav | Afghan Lamb Rolls | 1st | Kids in the Garden Focaccia |
| Nurman | Squid Ink Knots | 4th | Flowering Focaccia |

=== Episode 4: Nostalgia Week ===
| Baker | Signature (Layered Pavlova) | Technical (Apricot Steamed Pudding) | Showstopper (Nostalgic Mash-Up) |
|---|---|---|---|
| Aaron | Bloody Earl Pavlova | 3rd | Vanilla Slice with "Wagon Wheels" |
| Ashley | Poached Pear Pavlova | 5th | Koala Cake |
| Carmel | Vino Cotto Pavlova | 1st | Lamington & Trifle Cake |
| Ella | Cab Sav Pav | 2nd | Fairy Bread Tower |
| Hoda | Baklava Pavlova | 8th | Cherry Ripe Lamington Cake |
| Haydn | Layered Berry Pavlova | 9th | Frog in the Pond Lamington |
| Jawin | Halo-Halo Pavlova | 6th | Honey Jaw Toffee Vienetta Cake |
| Nav | Strawberry, Basil & Lime Pavlova | 7th | Harbour Bridge Cake |
| Nurman | Summertime in Hong Kong Pavlova | 4th | ANZAC, Jelly & Pavlova Tart |

=== Episode 5: Homegrown Week ===
| Baker | Signature (Open Galette) | Technical (Macadamia, Aniseed Myrtle, & Bush Honey Trifle) | Showstopper (Australian Native Bread Sculpture) |
|---|---|---|---|
| Aaron | Davidson Plum Galette | 1st | Blue-Ringed Octopus |
| Ashley | | | |
| Carmel | Pear Galette | 2nd | Crocodile Family |
| Ella | Aussie in America Galette | 4th | Kookaburra |
| Hoda | Quandong Galette | 5th | Turtle Family |
| Haydn | Shellfish Galette | 3rd | Bush Scene |
| Jawin | Cheesy Kangaroo Galette | 7th | Waratah |
| Nurman | Wallaby Galette | 6th | Lemon Myrtle Octopus |

=== Episode 6: French Week ===
| Baker | Signature (Mille-feuille) | Technical (Brioche à tête) | Showstopper (Religieuse a l'ancienne) |
|---|---|---|---|
| Aaron | Baklava Mille-Feuille | 3rd | Marbled Nun |
| Carmel | Tiramisu Mille-Feuille | 7th | Raspberry Vanilla Nun |
| Ella | Mille-Feuille'asauruses | 1st | "Mummy" |
| Hoda | Banoffee Pie Mille-Feuille | 5th | Mango Thai Basil Nun |
| Haydn | Hazelnut Raspberry Mille-Feuille | 4th | Lavender Nun |
| Jawin | Sweet & Salty Mille-Feuille | 6th | Bless-Choux Nun |
| Nurman | Sideways Mille-Feuille | 2nd | Flavour of the Tropics Nun |

=== Episode 7: Dessert Week ===
| Baker | Signature (Baked Custard) | Technical (Gourmet Raspberry Tart) | Showstopper (Dessert Charcuterie Board) |
|---|---|---|---|
| Aaron | Key Lime Pie Pot de Creme | 5th | Dessert for Dinner |
| Carmel | Baked Coconut Orange Custard | 6th | Mi Casa, Su Casa |
| Ella | Lulu's Tea Party | 1st | My Kids' Brekky |
| Hoda | Knafeh | 2nd | Sweet Citrus Board |
| Jawin | Thai Custard | 3rd | Jawin on a Plate |
| Nurman | Maple, Ginger, and Miso Custard | 4th | Ode to Tasmania |

=== Episode 8: Fruit & Veg Week ===
| Baker | Signature (Savoury Vegetable Tarts) | Technical (Erbazzone Pie) | Showstopper (Basket Weave Cake) |
|---|---|---|---|
| Aaron | Brunch Canapes | 2nd | Picnic Basket |
| Ella | Heartlets | 1st | Pina Colada Toy Basket |
| Hoda | Spanakopita & Beetroot Tartlets | 4th | Spiced Pumpkin Cake |
| Jawin | Banh Mi & Eggplant Tartlets | 5th | Yuzu & Tamarind Cake |
| Nurman | Onion Tarte Tatin & Crispy Kale Tartlet | 3rd | Rhubarb Rhubarb Cake |

=== Episode 9: Patisserie Week ===
| Baker | Signature (Breakfast Pastries) | Technical (Gateau St. Honoré) | Showstopper (Gravity-Defying Biscuit Piñata) |
|---|---|---|---|
| Aaron | Kouign-Amman & Rhubarb Danishes | 4th | Fish Piñata |
| Ella | Cheese Babka & Chocolate Rugelach | 1st | Worry Monster Piñata |
| Hoda | Bienenstich & Apple Strudels | 3rd | Unicorn Piñata |
| Nurman | Cruffins & Danish Pastries | 2nd | Piñata Face |

=== Episode 10: Finale ===
| Baker | Signature (Fondant Fancies) | Technical (Chocolate, Pear, and Hazelnut Torte) | Showstopper (Ultimate Dream Home Cake) |
|---|---|---|---|
| Aaron | Tea Fondant Fancies | 2nd | Tree House |
| Ella | Coffee Fondant Fancies | 3rd | Gateau Chateau |
| Nurman | Herb Fondant Fancies | 1st | Glass House |

== Ratings ==
| No. | Title | Air date | Overnight ratings | | Ref(s) |
| No. | Title | Air date | Viewers | Rank | Ref(s) |
|---|---|---|---|---|---|
| 1 | "Cakes" | 27 January 2022 | 73,000 | 1 | |
| 2 | "Biscuits" | 3 February 2022 | 56,000 | 3 | |
| 3 | "Bread" | 10 February 2022 | 61,000 | 1 | |
| 4 | "Nostalgia" | 17 February 2022 | 61,000 | 1 | |
| 5 | "Homegrown" | 24 February 2022 | 62,000 | 2 | |
| 6 | "French" | 3 March 2022 | 56,000 | 2 | |
| 7 | "Dessert" | 10 March 2022 | 66,000 | 4 | |
| 8 | "Fruit & Veg" | 17 March 2022 | 59,000 | 6 | |
| 9 | "Patisserie" | 24 March 2022 | 69,000 | 9 | |
| 10 | "Finale" | 31 March 2022 | 62,000 | 5 | |
