= Tom Walker (comedian) =

Australian comedian

- Born: June 13, 1989 (age 37)
- Education: École Philippe Gaulier
- Occupations: Comedian; clown; Twitch streamer
- Spouse: Demi Lardner

Twitch information
- Channel: TomWalker
- Years active: 2020–present
- Genre: Gaming
- Followers: 20.6 thousand
- Last updated: 9 July 2026
- Website: tomwalkerisgood.com

Tom Walker is an Australian comedian, clown, and Twitch streamer. He is a winner of two Melbourne International Comedy Festival awards and a Sydney Comedy Festival Director's Choice award, and his comedy special Very Very was picked up by Amazon Prime Video. He co-hosts the podcast bigsofttitty.png with his wife Demi Lardner and is the cohost for season 9 of The Great Australian Bake Off.

== Early life and education ==
Walker's improv awards include the 2007 Sydney School Theatresports Cup (Senior Division) as well as the 2011 National Theatresports Championship and Cranston Cup Championship. Walker trained in clowning at the École Philippe Gaulier in 2014 for two years, after initially attending the school for a one-month summer intensive course. He was directly taught by Gaulier, who is known for his insults, though Walker has said he got off comparatively lightly on that front, stating he "like[d] the honesty of the negativity".

== Career ==
Walker won the Melbourne International Comedy Festival's Best Newcomer award in 2016 for his show Beep Boop. That same year at the festival, his comedy group Feeble Minds with Sam Campbell, Craig Anderson and Aaron Chen also won the Director's Choice award. Additionally in 2016, Walker appeared in Whose Line Is It Anyway? Australia in 2016. His show Bee Boo, which featured less audience participation than Beep Boop, was nominated for the 2017 Melbourne International Comedy Festival Award, then known as the Barry Award; he tattooed the words "Barry Award Winner 2017" on his arm in joking anticipation of the award, and later had the tattoo crossed out when Hannah Gadsby took home the award for their show Nanette. Walker was long-listed for the 2021 AACTA Awards. The Herald Sun called Honk Honk Honk Honk Honk, his 2018 show, an "unforgettable collection of physical and prop comedy marred by a few forgettable sequences."

His 2019 show Very Very, directed by Zoë Coombs Marr, was picked up as an Amazon Prime Video special and released in May 2020. With the show largely based around the concept of mime, Paste praised Walker's "impeccable timing" and "combination of sweat and talent". Walker and Demi Lardner's 2019 show We Mustn't won the Sydney Comedy Festival's Directors Choice award in 2019. During the COVID-19 pandemic, Walker said he and Lardner had "pretty much moved everything online", particularly using livestreaming platform Twitch, as well as making more sketch comedy. They also co-host the podcast bigsofttitty.png.

He created his 2022 show Javelin, about a hypothetical career in which he had spent 12 years as a professional javelin thrower; The Guardian said the show had "lots to enjoy, even if the central conceit [did] not soar." Walker was selected as part of the 2023 lineup of International New Faces of Comedy by Just for Laughs. His 2024 show My Treasures My Beautiful Treasures departed from his usual absurd and physical comedy and instead involved a simple stand-up presentation about communities of "pathetic men who aren’t hurting anyone" on the internet, such as groups of men with micropenises. Livestreaming on Twitch, Walker embarked on a months-long play through of Grand Theft Auto IV with the Warp Eleven mod, in which the speed of the cars in the game were increased to "warp speed". Aftermath called the video series "a slapstick spectacle for the ages." Walker completed the game's main storyline in late 2024.

In 2025 Walker joined The Great Australian Bake Off as a co-host for season nine. The terms of his employment included removing his mullet and a ban on poo jokes. In July 2026, it was announced that Walker would feature as a contestant on series 6 of Taskmaster Australia.

== Personal life ==
Walker is married to fellow comedian Demi Lardner.
