= Lifestyle Food =

- Country: Australia

Programming
- Timeshift service: Lifestyle Food + 2

Ownership
- Owner: Foxtel Networks
- Sister channels: Foxtel Networks channels

History
- Launched: 14 March 2004

Links
- Website: www.lifestylefood.com.au

Original logo

Lifestyle Food (stylised as Lifestyle FOOD) is an Australian pay-TV food channel, solely dedicated to food, wine and restaurant society. The channel is a subsidiary of Lifestyle, which runs 24 hours a day on Foxtel.

On 19 September 2016, Lifestyle refreshed its look which included a new logo.

== Programming ==
=== Original programming ===
- Come Dine with Me Australia
- The Great Australian Bake Off
- Great BBQ Challenge
- Stuart MacGill Uncorked (2007)
- Paddock to Plate
- Planet Cake (2012)
- River Cottage Australia (2013–2014 on LifeStyle, 2015–present on Lifestyle Food)
- Hemsley + Hemsley: Healthy & Delicious
- Darren Robertson's Charcoal Kitchen (2014)
- Donna Hay: Basics to Brilliance (2016)

=== Acquired programming ===
- Everyday Gourmet with Justine Schofield
- Food Safari
- Nigella Kitchen
- Jamie at Home
- Bill's Food
- Masterchef
- Come Dine With Me
- Ace of Cakes
- Mary's Kitchen Crush
- Travel, Cook, Repeat with Curtis Stone
- Field Trip with Curtis Stone

== See also ==
- 7food network
- SBS Food
