= Zumbo's Just Desserts season 2 =

Zumbo's Just Desserts
- Season 2
- Presented by: Adriano Zumbo; Rachel Khoo
- Winner: Catherine
- No. of episodes: 10

Release
- Original network: Seven Network
- Original release: November 17 – December 5, 2019

Season chronology
- ← Previous; Season 1

The second season of Zumbo's Just Desserts premiered in Australia on November 17, 2019, on Seven Network. Ten contestants were selected to compete. The winner of this season won the grand prize of $100,000 and earns the title of "Zumbo's Just Desserts Winner".

The show is hosted by Adriano Zumbo and Rachel Khoo. On May 16, 2019, it was announced that the assistant Gigi Falanga, who appeared in the previous season, was not returning.

== Competition structure ==
Each chapter is divided into two stages. The "Sweet Sensations task" and the "Zumbo Test".

During the first challenge, regularly with a duration of three hours, each contestant must create a dessert following the theme and rules given by the judges at the beginning. Rachel and Zumbo evaluate each of the creations, determining a winner, who gets the Dessert Of The Day. They also declare those who were safe from the second phase and the two bakers who will go to the second phase or elimination round.

The elimination round, or Zumbo Test, consists of testing the bottom bakers with original Zumbo creations, where at least one baker will go home.

== Contestants ==
Name	Age	Job	Status
Catherine	19	Student	Winner (Episode 10)
Simon	36	Concreter	Second (Episode 10)
Jeff	50	Competitive Dad	Eliminated (Episode 9)
Kylie	45	Sugarcane Farmer	Eliminated (Episode 7)
Rachel	32	Playgroup Leader	Eliminated (Episode 6)
Kristie	35	Cake Pop Decorator	Eliminated (Episode 5)
Zak	39	Account Manager	Eliminated (Episode 4)
Megan	32	Perfectionist Mum	Eliminated (Episode 3)
Pearly	29	Flight Attendant	Eliminated (Episode 2)
Kimberley	45	Office Worker	Eliminated (Episode 1)

== Contestant progress ==
	Week 1				Week 2			Week 3		
Catherine	DOTD (Safe)	HIGH (Safe)	DOTD (Safe)	LOW (Safe)	HIGH (Safe)	HIGH (14) (Safe)	DOTD (Safe)	GT (18)	DNP (Safe)	Winner (33)
Simon	HIGH (Safe)	SS (Safe)	HIGH (Safe)	DOTD (Safe)	DOTD (Safe)	DOTD (18) (Safe)	ZT (17)	SS (SF)	SS/ZT (31)	' Runner Up (32)
Jeff	LOW (Safe)	SS (Safe)	SS (Safe)	SS (Safe)	ZT (14)	LOW (13) (Safe)	ZT (15)	ZT (17)	SS/ZT (30)	Eliminated(Episode 9)
Kylie	SS (Safe)	DOTD (Safe)	SS (Safe)	HIGH (Safe)	HIGH (Safe)	ZT (SS:11) (ZT:16)	ZT (14)	Eliminated (Episode 7)		
Rachel	SS (Safe)	HIGH (Safe)	ZT (16)	SS (Safe)	LOW (Safe)	ZT (SS:9) (ZT:15)	Eliminated (Episode 6)			
Kristie	ZT (16)	SS (Safe)	SS (Safe)	ZT (12)	ZT (13)	Eliminated (Episode 5)				
Zak	SS (Safe)	ZT (13)	LOW (Safe)	ZT (10)	Eliminated (Episode 4)					
Megan	SS (Safe)	LOW (Safe)	ZT (14)	Eliminated (Episode 3)						
Pearly	HIGH (Safe)	ZT (10)	Eliminated (Episode 2)							
Kimberley	ZT (11)	Eliminated (Episode 1)								

'Dessert Of The Day'
Produce one of the favorite desserts but was not crowned 'Dessert Of The Day'
Produce one of the weakest desserts but was not in the 'Zumbo Test'
Won the 'Zumbo Test'
Lost the 'Zumbo Test'
Eliminated from the competition
Press the 'Golden Button'
Won the 'Zumbo Test' to earn 'Golden Ticket' as a shortcut to the Grand Final
Lost the 'Zumbo Test' to earn the 'Golden Ticket'
Sent to the Semi-Final
Series winner
Series runner up

SS: Sweet Sensations Challenge
ZT: Zumbo Test
DNP: Through to the Finals!

== Series details ==
=== Episode 1 – Make Some Magic! ===
- Airdate — 17 November 2019
- Sweet Sensations — The Dessert Makers had to create a dessert that has a secret inside.
- Zumbo Test — The bottom two contestants had to recreate Zumbo's cake "I'm Not Lion".

Sweet Sensations details
Contestant	Dessert	Result
Catherine	Orange Mousse Cake with Lemon Curd & Almond Ice Cream	Safe (DOTD)
Simon	Chocolate Dome with Raspberry Macaron & Nutty Crumble	Safe
Pearly	Strawberry Crèmeux with Sponge & Red Mirror Glaze	Safe
Kylie	Lemon Curd with Coconut Biscuit and Strawberry Sauce	Safe
Megan	Honeycomb & Praline Semifreddo with Chocolate Gâteaux	Safe
Rachel	White Chocolate Mousse with Raspberry Cream & Mojito Pearls	Safe
Zak	Raspberry & Rosewater Mousse with Ruby Chocolate	Safe
Jeff	Coconut Mousse with Aniseed Sorbet	Safe
Kristie	Coconut Panna Cotta with Lime Curd & White Chocolate Glaze	Bottom Two (Zumbo Test)
Kimberley	Chocolate Orange Mousse with Almond Biscuit & Chocolate Flower	Bottom Two (Zumbo Test)

Zumbo Test details
Contestant	Dessert	Scores (out of 10)		Total (out of 20)	Result
Contestant	Dessert	Zumbo	Rachel	Total (out of 20)	Result
Kristie	Zumbo's I'm Not Lion (Layered of Macadamia & Coconut Crumble, Passion Fruit & Caramel Crèmeux, Chocolate & Olive Oil Sponge, Passion Fruit Caramel, Coconut & Chocolate Mousse, Passion Fruit & Caramel Mousse with Strawberries)	8	8	16	Safe
Kimberley	Zumbo's I'm Not Lion (Layered of Macadamia & Coconut Crumble, Passion Fruit & Caramel Crèmeux, Chocolate & Olive Oil Sponge, Passion Fruit Caramel, Coconut & Chocolate Mousse, Passion Fruit & Caramel Mousse with Strawberries)	5	6	11	Eliminated

=== Episode 2 – The Terrifying Tower ===
- Airdate — 18 November 2019
- Sweet Sensations — The Dessert Makers had to create a dessert tower at least half a meter high.
- Zumbo Test — The bottom two had to recreate the Zumbo's "Lucky 13".

Sweet Sensations details
Contestant	Dessert	Result
Kylie	Tropical Layer Cake with Pineapple Flowers	Safe (DOTD)
Catherine	Berry & Caramel Macaron Profiterole Tower	'Safe
Rachel	Choux Bun Mermaid Tower with Lemon Madeleines	'Safe
Jeff	Éclair & Profiterole Tower with Nougatine	'Safe
Kristie	Chocolate & Caramel Cake Pop Tower	'Safe
Simon	Éclair Tower with Layered Mocha Cake	'Safe
Megan	Coconut & Pineapple Palm with Rice Paper Leaves	'Safe
Zak	White Chocolate Choux Tower with Greek Yoghurt Cake	Bottom Two (Zumbo Test)
Pearly	Lemonade Cake with Raspberry Buttercream, Confetti Blondie & Musk	Bottom Two (Zumbo Test)

Zumbo Test details
Contestant	Dessert	Scores (out of 10)		Total (out of 20)	Result
Contestant	Dessert	Zumbo	Rachel	Total (out of 20)	Result
Zak	Zumbo's Lucky 13 (Layered with Confetti Cake, Chocolate Ganache, Cherry Jam & Marshmallow Buttercream & Thirteen Different-colored Tempered Chocolate Rings)	6	7	13	Safe
Pearly	Zumbo's Lucky 13 (Layered with Confetti Cake, Chocolate Ganache, Cherry Jam & Marshmallow Buttercream & Thirteen Different-colored Tempered Chocolate Rings)	5	5	10	Eliminated

=== Episode 3 – Sundae Dream ===
- Airdate — 19 November 2019
- Sweet Sensations — The Dessert Makers had to create an original-refined version of a sundae.
- Zumbo Test — The bottom two had to recreate Zumbo's "Lazy Sundae".

Sweet Sensations details
Contestant	Dessert	Result
Catherine	Matcha & Yuzu Sundae	Safe (DOTD)
Simon	Strawberry & Rhubarb Sundae	Safe
Jeff	Pink Vanilla & Hazelnut Sundae	Safe
Kristie	Raspberry & Turkish Delight Sundae	Safe
Kylie	Churro Cherry Chocolate Sundae	Safe
Zak	Halva Pistachio & Orange Sundae	Safe
Rachel	Chocolate Brownie & Banana Sundae	Bottom Two (Zumbo Test)
Megan	Chocolate Chip Cookie Dough Sundae	Bottom Two (Zumbo Test)

Zumbo Test details
Contestant	Dessert	Scores (out of 10)		Total (out of 20)	Result
Contestant	Dessert	Zumbo	Rachel	Total (out of 20)	Result
Rachel	Zumbo's Lazy Sundae (Sponge Cake, Peanut Butter with Ganache & Caramel Ice Cream Couch, Banana Crèmeux with Caramelized Bananas & Chocolate TV with Pistachio Crunch and Custard, Lollies & Biscuits)	8	8	16	Safe
Megan	Zumbo's Lazy Sundae (Sponge Cake, Peanut Butter with Ganache & Caramel Ice Cream Couch, Banana Crèmeux with Caramelized Bananas & Chocolate TV with Pistachio Crunch and Custard, Lollies & Biscuits)	7	7	14	Eliminated

=== Episode 4 – Out of This World ===
- Airdate — 20 November 2019
- Sweet Sensations — Each Dessert Maker had to create a space themed dessert.
- Zumbo Test — The bottom two had to recreate Zumbo's cake "Planet Zumbo".

Sweet Sensations details
Contestant	Dessert	Result
Simon	"UF-Fro" Coconut Mousse with Mango Chilli Jelly & Coriander Sorbet	Safe (DOTD)
Kylie	"Planet Saturn" Chocolate Caramel Mousse Stack with Brownie, Brittle & Banana	Safe
Jeff	White Chocolate Planet with Mousse & Raspberry Rose Jelly	Safe
Rachel	"Lunar Landscape" Black Sesame Cheesecake with Marshmallow & Beetroot Sponge	Safe
Catherine	White Chocolate Egg with Pistachio Mousse & Passion Fruit Curd	Safe
Kristie	"The Milky Way" Maple Popcorn Shot, Blueberry Brownie with Blueberry Caviar	Bottom Two (Zumbo Test)
Zak	"Alien Brain" with Jelly Worms & Coconut Dacquoise	Bottom Two (Zumbo Test)

Zumbo Test details
Contestant	Dessert	Scores (out of 10)		Total (out of 20)	Result
Contestant	Dessert	Zumbo	Rachel	Total (out of 20)	Result
Kristie	Zumbo's Planet Zumbo (layered with Black Sticky Rice with Mango, Devil's Food Cake, Blackberry & Black Tea Ganache, Blackcurrant Buttercream with Black Licorice, with Black & other colors Glazed, Aerated Chocolate Rock)	6	6	12	Safe
Zak	Zumbo's Planet Zumbo (layered with Black Sticky Rice with Mango, Devil's Food Cake, Blackberry & Black Tea Ganache, Blackcurrant Buttercream with Black Licorice, with Black & other colors Glazed, Aerated Chocolate Rock)	5	5	10	Eliminated

=== Episode 5 – An Enchanted Party ===
- Airdate — 24 November 2019
- Sweet Sensations — The Dessert Makers had to make an enchanted kid's party cake.
- Zumbo Test — The bottom two had to recreate Zumbo's "Fruitina".

Sweet Sensations details
Contestant	Dessert	Result
Simon	"Castle Cake on Top of The Beanstalk" Orange & Almond Cake, Cream Cheese Frosting with Pop Rocks and White Chocolate	Safe (DOTD)
Catherine	"Fantasy Tree Stump" Chocolate Sponge, Strawberry Mousse & Hazelnut Ganache	Safe
Kylie	"Secret Garden Cake" Strawberry Cake, Lemon & Vanilla Cake, Strawberry Jam & Buttercream	Safe
Rachel	"Rainbow Hedgiehog" Rainbow Cake with Buttercream & Passion Fruit Curd	Safe
Jeff	"End of the Rainbow Cake"Beetroot & Raspberry Red Velvet with Pistachio Moss and Dark Chocolate Ganache	Bottom Two (Zumbo Test)
Kristie	"The Chocolate Room" Vanilla Cake, Vanilla Buttercream & Passion Fruit Curd	Bottom Two (Zumbo Test)

Zumbo Test details
Contestant	Dessert	Scores (out of 10)		Total (out of 20)	Result
Contestant	Dessert	Zumbo	Rachel	Total (out of 20)	Result
Jeff	Zumbo's Fruitina (made with Pink Grapefruit Diplomat Cream, Compressed Watermelon, Compressed Mango, Green Tea Matcha and Pistachio Sponge with Chocolate Decorations, Fresh-Fruit Headband, Peach Glaze and a Granola & Yogurt Base)	7	7	14	Safe
Kristie	Zumbo's Fruitina (made with Pink Grapefruit Diplomat Cream, Compressed Watermelon, Compressed Mango, Green Tea Matcha and Pistachio Sponge with Chocolate Decorations, Fresh-Fruit Headband, Peach Glaze and a Granola & Yogurt Base)	6	7	13	Eliminated

=== Episode 6 – Suspended in Time ===
- Airdate — 25 November 2019
- Sweet Sensations — The dessert makers had to create a dessert that looks like a moment in time. As a plot twist, the baker who finished at first his/her dessert can push the golden button, which gives 2 extra points for this stage. Jeff pushed the golden button.
- Zumbo Test — The bottom two had to recreate Zumbo's cake "About Time".

Sweet Sensations details
Contestant	Dessert	Result
Simon	"The Splash" Chocolate Mandarin Tart, Mint Mousse Ball & Mint Basil Ice Cream	Safe (DOTD)
Catherine	"Spilt Coconut" Coconut Mousse with Pineapple Compote & Passion Fruit Jelly	Safe
Jeff	"Frozen Cube" with Mango Passion Fruit Egg	Safe
Kylie	"Man on the Moon Pear Cream Tart with Coffee and White Chocolate Mousse & Pear Jelly	Bottom Two (Zumbo Test)
Rachel	"The Outback" Lemon Myrtle Panna Cotta, Wattleseed Shortbread & Bush Honey Meringues	Bottom Two (Zumbo Test)

Zumbo Test details
Contestant	Dessert	Scores (out of 10)		Total (out of 20)	Result
Contestant	Dessert	Zumbo	Rachel	Total (out of 20)	Result
Kylie	Zumbo's About Time (layered with Lemon & Thyme Gel and Sponge, Vegemite-toasted Brûlée, Coffee and Maple Syrup Mousse, & Chocolate decorations, Marbled Chocolate, Chocolate Sablé Tartshell, Salted Caramel, Caramel Ganache infused with Lemon and Thyme)	8	8	16	Safe
Rachel	Zumbo's About Time (layered with Lemon & Thyme Gel and Sponge, Vegemite-toasted Brûlée, Coffee and Maple Syrup Mousse, & Chocolate decorations, Marbled Chocolate, Chocolate Sablé Tartshell, Salted Caramel, Caramel Ganache infused with Lemon and Thyme)	7	8	15	Eliminated

=== Episode 7 – Fright Night ===
- Airdate — 26 November 2019
- Sweet Sensations — The dessert makers had to create a horror inspired dessert.
- Zumbo Test — The bottom three had to recreate Zumbo's "Eyes on the Mummy".

Sweet Sensations details
Contestant	Dessert	Result
Catherine	"The Poison Apple" Almond Sponge with Caramel Cream, Apple Compote and Granny Smith Mousse	Safe (DOTD)
Simon	"The Skull" Red Velvet Cake with Cookie Cream Cheese Icing & Red Fudge Sauce	Bottom Three (Zumbo Test)
Jeff	"Jelly Eyeballs" Durian Chiffon Cake with Blood Orange Jelly	Bottom Three (Zumbo Test)
Kylie	"The Grave" Date & Walnut Cake. White Chocolate Ganache and an Orange Butter Cream	Bottom Three (Zumbo Test)

Zumbo Test details
Contestant	Dessert	Scores (out of 10)		Total (out of 20)	Result
Contestant	Dessert	Zumbo	Rachel	Total (out of 20)	Result
Simon	Zumbo's Eyes on the Mummy (layered with Vanilla Shortcake, Strawberry Chiffon Sponge, Vanilla Whipped Ganache, Caramel & Tonka Bean Crèmeux, Italian Meringues, Pashmak, Strawberry Coulis Blood, Mini Macaron Shells & Tempered White Chocolate Squares)	8	9	17	Safe
Jeff	Zumbo's Eyes on the Mummy (layered with Vanilla Shortcake, Strawberry Chiffon Sponge, Vanilla Whipped Ganache, Caramel & Tonka Bean Crèmeux, Italian Meringues, Pashmak, Strawberry Coulis Blood, Mini Macaron Shells & Tempered White Chocolate Squares)	7	8	15	Safe
Kylie	Zumbo's Eyes on the Mummy (layered with Vanilla Shortcake, Strawberry Chiffon Sponge, Vanilla Whipped Ganache, Caramel & Tonka Bean Crèmeux, Italian Meringues, Pashmak, Strawberry Coulis Blood, Mini Macaron Shells & Tempered White Chocolate Squares)	7	7	14	Eliminated

=== Episode 8 – Smoke and Mirrors ===
- Airdate — 4 December 2019
- Sweet Sensations — The dessert makers had to create a reflective mirror-like dessert. As a plot twist, just the top two qualified for the Zumbo Test.
- Zumbo Test — The top two had to recreate Zumbo's "Time for a Grilling". The winner of this stage received the Golden Ticket to the Grand Final.

Sweet Sensations details
Contestant	Dessert	Result
Jeff	Mirrored Honey Cake with Smoked Cinnamon Yoghurt Sorbet & Fresh Figs	Pass to Zumbo Test
Catherine	"Reflective Cylinder" Baked Lemon Cheesecake with Grapefruit Sorbet & Meringue	Pass to Zumbo Test
Simon	"Pear-fect" Pear Mousse on Rosemary Walnut Biscuit with Blue Cheese Ganache	Sent to the Semi-Final

Zumbo Test details
Contestant	Dessert	Scores (out of 10)		Total (out of 20)	Result
Contestant	Dessert	Zumbo	Rachel	Total (out of 20)	Result
Catherine	Zumbo's Time for a Grilling (tomato made with Tomato Jelly, Strawberry Compote & Burnt Vanilla Cream, corn made with Salted Popcorn Mousse with a Pineapple Compote, Manchego Cheese and Butter Spray,Mont Black Potato-like Flavored with Lime & Passion Fruit, Vanilla Cream and Candied Chestnut, and chicken leg made with Salted Caramel & Chicken Jus Mousse with Coconut and Hazelnut Namelaka)	9	9	18	Safe (Golden Ticket)
Jeff	Zumbo's Time for a Grilling (tomato made with Tomato Jelly, Strawberry Compote & Burnt Vanilla Cream, corn made with Salted Popcorn Mousse with a Pineapple Compote, Manchego Cheese and Butter Spray,Mont Black Potato-like Flavored with Lime & Passion Fruit, Vanilla Cream and Candied Chestnut, and chicken leg made with Salted Caramel & Chicken Jus Mousse with Coconut and Hazelnut Namelaka)	9	8	17	Sent to the Semi-Final

=== Episode 9 – Secret Garden ===
- Airdate — 5 December 2019
- Sweet Sensations — The dessert makers had to create a dessert that's inspired by a botanical garden.
- Zumbo Test — The dessert makers had to recreate Zumbo's "Vertical Garden". The higher scoring contestant was sent to the Grand Final, the lower scoring contestant was eliminated.

Sweet Sensations details
Contestant	Dessert	Scores (out of 10)		Total (out of 20)
Contestant	Dessert	Zumbo	Rachel	Total (out of 20)
Simon	"Manava's Garden" Raspberry Pistachio Opera Cake with Honey Pistachio Ice Cream & Chocolate Tuile	8	9	17
Jeff	"The Forest Floor" Peach Mousse, Blackberry Jelly, Peach Tarte Tatin & Rosemary Ice Cream	7	7	14

Zumbo Test details
Contestant	Dessert	Scores (out of 10)		Total (out of 20)	Total Score (out of 40)	Result
Contestant	Dessert	Zumbo	Rachel	Total (out of 20)	Total Score (out of 40)	Result
Simon	Zumbo's Vertical Garden (layered with Ginger & Black Pepper Ice Cream, Yuzu & Pineapple Sorbet and Marmalade, Eucalyptus Caramel, Citrus Sponge, Vanilla Ganache, Green Rocher Glaze, base made with Wild Orange Jelly, Cucumber Meringue & Compressed Cucumber. Decorations with Microherbs and Flowers)	7	7	14	31	Grand Final
Jeff	Zumbo's Vertical Garden (layered with Ginger & Black Pepper Ice Cream, Yuzu & Pineapple Sorbet and Marmalade, Eucalyptus Caramel, Citrus Sponge, Vanilla Ganache, Green Rocher Glaze, base made with Wild Orange Jelly, Cucumber Meringue & Compressed Cucumber. Decorations with Microherbs and Flowers)	8	8	16	30	Third

=== Episode 10 – Bring on the Bling ===
- Airdate — 5 December 2019
- Detail — Unlike former episodes, the final two took part in the Zumbo Test first and the Sweet Sensations last.
- Final Zumbo Test — The final two contestants had to recreate Zumbo's "The Sweet Smell of Success".
- Final Sweet Sensations — The final two had to create a dessert with a sense of luxury and bling.

Zumbo Test details
Contestant	Dessert	Scores (out of 10)		Total (out of 20)
Contestant	Dessert	Zumbo	Rachel	Total (out of 20)
Simon	Zumbo's The Sweet Smell of Success (table w/drawer made with Chocolate, inside of drawer Chocolate Bonbons of Cherry Reduction with Caviar & Vanilla-balsamic Ganache, perfume made with Almond Crunch Base, Raspberries, Peach Cheesecake Mousse, Turkish Delight Jelly & Peach Compote, crystal perfume made with Issomalt & Metallic Glitter)	8	8	16
Catherine	Zumbo's The Sweet Smell of Success (table w/drawer made with Chocolate, inside of drawer Chocolate Bonbons of Cherry Reduction with Caviar & Vanilla-balsamic Ganache, perfume made with Almond Crunch Base, Raspberries, Peach Cheesecake Mousse, Turkish Delight Jelly & Peach Compote, crystal perfume made with Issomalt & Metallic Glitter)	7	7	14

Sweet Sensations details
Contestant	Dessert	Scores (out of 10)		Total (out of 20)	Total Score (out of 40)	Result
Contestant	Dessert	Zumbo	Rachel	Total (out of 20)	Total Score (out of 40)	Result
Catherine	"Ruby Rings"; Plum & Pear Biscuit Rings with Rhubarb Cream & Salted Caramel Ice Cream	9	10	19	33	Winner
Simon	"Black Pearl"; Chocolate, Hazelnut, & Caramel Mousse on a Banana & Passion Fruit Crèmeux	8	8	16	32	Runner-up
