= Zumbo's Just Desserts season 1 =

Zumbo's Just Desserts
- Season 1
- Presented by: Adriano Zumbo; Rachel Khoo
- Winner: Kate Ferguson
- No. of episodes: 12

Release
- Original network: Seven Network
- Original release: August 22 – September 27, 2016

Season chronology
- Next → Season 2

The first season of Zumbo's Just Desserts premiered in Australia on August 22, 2016, on Seven Network. Twelve contestants were selected to compete. The winner of the first season won the grand prize of $100,000, gets an opportunity have one of their creations in Zumbo's stores and finally the title of "Zumbo's Just Desserts Winner".

The show is hosted by Adriano Zumbo and Rachel Khoo, with Gigi Falanga as assistant.

The winner was 37-year-old Kate Ferguson.

== Competition structure ==
Each chapter is divided into two stages. The "Sweet Sensations task" and the "Zumbo Test".

During the first challenge, regularly with a duration of three hours, each contestant must create a dessert following the theme and rules given by the judges at the beginning. Rachel and Zumbo evaluate each of the creations, determining a winner, who gets the Dessert Of The Day. They also declare those who were safe from the second phase and the two bakers who will go to the second phase or elimination round.

The elimination round, or Zumbo Test, consists of testing the bottom bakers with original Zumbo creations, where at least one baker will go home.

== Contestants ==
Name	Age	Occupation	Status
Kate	37	No-nonsense mum	Winner (Episode 12)
Ali	28	Insurance Broker	Runner-Up (Episode 12)
Brogen	22	Stay-At-Home Mum	Third (Episode 11)
Daniel	25	Bouncer	Eliminated (Episode 9)
Irene	34	Finance Analyst	Eliminated (Episode 8)
Amie	24	Admin Assistant	Eliminated (Episode 7)
Ashley	28	Airline Crewing Officer	Eliminated (Episode 6)
Michael	51	Bricklayer	Eliminated (Episode 5)
Vicki	43	Technical Writer	Eliminated (Episode 4)
Patricia	33	Social Media Manager	Eliminated (Episode 3)
Peter	57	Car Salesman	Eliminated (Episode 2)
Wendy	39	Art Lover	Eliminated (Episode 1)

== Contestant progress ==
Name	Week 1			Week 2		Week 3		Week 4		Week 5		Week 6
Kate	DOTD (Safe)	SS (Safe)	ZT (14)	HIGH (Safe)	ZT (11)	LOW (Safe)	HIGH (Safe)	DOTD (Safe)	ZT (17)	ZT (14)	SS/ZT (32)	Winner (33)
Ali	SS (Safe)	LOW (Safe)	DOTD (Safe)	HIGH (Safe)	DOTD (Safe)	ZT (14)	ZT (17)	HIGH (Safe)	DOTD (Safe)	GT (16)	DNP (Safe)	Runner Up (32)
Brogen	LOW (Safe)	SS (Safe)	SS (Safe)	LOW (Safe)	HIGH (Safe)	HIGH (Safe)	SS (Safe)	ZT (16)	HIGH (Safe)	SS (SF)	ZT (28)	Third (Episode 11)
Daniel	LOW (Safe)	SS (Safe)	HIGH (Safe)	SS (Safe)	SS (Safe)	SS (Safe)	LOW (Safe)	LOW (Safe)	ZT (13)	Eliminated (Episode 9)		
Irene	HIGH (Safe)	HIGH (Safe)	SS (Safe)	SS (Safe)	SS (Safe)	SS (Safe)	DOTD (Safe)	ZT (14)	Eliminated (Episode 8)			
Amie	SS (Safe)	SS (Safe)	SS (Safe)	DOTD (Safe)	HIGH (Safe)	DOTD (Safe)	ZT (12)	Eliminated (Episode 7)				
Ashley	SS (Safe)	DOTD (Safe)	LOW (Safe)	ZT (14)	LOW (Safe)	ZT (12)	Eliminated (Episode 6)					
Michael	SS (Safe)	LOW (Safe)	SS (Safe)	SS (Safe)	ZT (9)	Eliminated (Episode 5)						
Vicki	SS (Safe)	SS (Safe)	LOW (Safe)	ZT (10)	Eliminated (Episode 4)							
Patricia	SS (Safe)	ZT (12)	ZT (10)	Eliminated (Episode 3)								
Peter	ZT (11)	ZT (10)	Eliminated (Episode 2)									
Wendy	ZT (6)	Eliminated (Episode 1)										

'Dessert Of The Day'
Produce the favorite dessert but was not crowned 'Dessert Of The Day'
Produce the worst dessert but was not in the 'Zumbo Test'
Won the 'Zumbo Test'
Lost the 'Zumbo Test'
Eliminated
Won 'Golden Ticket' to the Grand Final
Sent to the Semi-Final
Series winner
Series runner up

DOTD: Dessert Of The Day
ZT: Zumbo Test
DNP: Through to the Finals

== Series details ==
=== Episode 1 - Reflective Dessert ===
- Airdate — 22 August 2016
- Sweet Sensations — The Dessert Makers had to create a dessert that reflected themselves.
- Zumbo Test — The bottom two contestants had to recreate Zumbo's dessert dome. The lower scoring contestant is then eliminated.

Sweet Sensations details
Contestant	Dessert	Result
Kate	Apple Pie Mille-Feuille	Safe (DOTD)
Ali	Chocolate Orange Sphere	Safe
Amie	Deconstructed Lemon Meringue	Safe
Ashley	Whimsical Pavlova	Safe
Brogen	Raspberry Mousse with Chocolate Layered Rose	Safe
Daniel	Red skin cream with Lychee Fruit Loop ice cream and gels	Safe
Irene	Caramel Passion Mousse and Coffee Soil	Safe
Michael	Choux Pastry with Lemon Cheesecake	Safe
Patricia	Chocolate Chilli Tart	Safe
Vicki	Plum and Chocolate Mousse	Safe
Peter	Layered Fruit Sponge Cake with Passionfruit Ice-Cream	Bottom Two (Zumbo Test)
Wendy	Salted Caramel Apple Pie with Vanilla Cinnamon Ice-Cream	Bottom Two (Zumbo Test)

Zumbo Test details
Contestant	Dessert	Scores (out of 10)		Total (out of 20)	Result
Contestant	Dessert	Zumbo	Rachel	Total (out of 20)	Result
Peter	Zumbo's Reflective Dessert Dome (Layers of Mandarin Gel, Salted Caramel, Yuzu Cream, Mirror Glaze & Hazelnut Sable)	5	6	11	Safe
Wendy	Zumbo's Reflective Dessert Dome (Layers of Mandarin Gel, Salted Caramel, Yuzu Cream, Mirror Glaze & Hazelnut Sable)	3	3	6	Eliminated

=== Episode 2 - Franken-Dessert ===
- Airdate — 23 August 2016
- Sweet Sensations — The Dessert Makers had to create a franken-dessert, a combination of two desserts in one.
- Zumbo Test — The bottom two had to recreate the FrankenZumbo, made from five different desserts. The lower scoring contestant would be eliminated.

Sweet Sensations details
Contestant	Dessert	Result
Ashley	Wagon Wheel Lamington	Safe (DOTD)
Ali	Rices Rhubarb Tart	Safe
Amie	Black Forest Trifle	Safe
Brogen	Creme Bru-Piklets	Safe
Daniel	Noir Tart To Ron	Safe
Irene	Apple Pumble	Safe
Kate	Lemon Meringue Croquembouche	Safe
Vicki	Pavana Split	Safe
Michael	Black Forest Custard Tart	Safe
Patricia	Red Velvet Brownie and Cheesecake	Bottom Two (Zumbo Test)
Peter	Raspberry Tart and Lemon Meringue Pie	Bottom Two (Zumbo Test)

Zumbo Test details
Contestant	Dessert	Scores (out of 10)		Total (out of 20)	Result
Contestant	Dessert	Zumbo	Rachel	Total (out of 20)	Result
Patricia	FrankenZumbo (Layered with Pavlova, Macarons, Ricotta Pancake, Brownie & Lemon Tart)	6	6	12	Safe
Peter	FrankenZumbo (Layered with Pavlova, Macarons, Ricotta Pancake, Brownie & Lemon Tart)	5	5	10	Eliminated

=== Episode 3 - Love & Chocolate Dessert ===
- Airdate — 24 August 2016
- Sweet Sensations — The Dessert Makers had to make a romantic dessert with chocolate as the main ingredient.
- Zumbo Test — The bottom two had to recreate Zumbo's love themed Croquembouche, the Lovenbouche. The lower scoring contestant would be eliminated.

Sweet Sensations details
Contestant	Dessert	Result
Ali	Textures of White Chocolate	Safe (DOTD)
Amie	Red Velvet Cake with White Chocolate Mousse	Safe
Ashley	White Chocolate Mousse with White Chocolate Dome	Safe
Brogen	Layered Chocolate and Orange Mousse Cake	Safe
Daniel	White Chocolate, Berry And Rose Petit made but also	Safe
Irene	White Chocolate Bark And Rhubarb Chocolate Mousse	Safe
Michael	Chocolate Custard Tart With Strawberry Velvet Ice	Safe
Vicki	Pink Peppercorn and Dark Chocolate Mousse	Safe
Kate	White Chocolate Panna Cotta	Bottom Two (Zumbo Test)
Patricia	Triple Chocolate Mousse	Bottom Two (Zumbo Test)

Zumbo Test details
Contestant	Dessert	Scores (out of 10)		Total (out of 20)	Result
Contestant	Dessert	Zumbo	Rachel	Total (out of 20)	Result
Kate	Lovenbouche (made with profiteroles, chocolate custard, amber caramel, almond nougatine & decorated with red isomalt hearts)	7	7	14	Safe
Patricia	Lovenbouche (made with profiteroles, chocolate custard, amber caramel, almond nougatine & decorated with red isomalt hearts)	5	5	10	Eliminated

=== Episode 4 - Kids' Party Cake ===
- Airdate — 29 August 2016
- Sweet Sensations — Each Dessert Maker had to create a cake suited for a kids' party, with little Zumbinos (kids) to taste the cakes
- Zumbo Test — The bottom two had to recreate Zumbo's school desk inspired cake named "back-to-school". The lower scoring contestant was eliminated

Sweet Sensations details
Contestant	Dessert	Result
Amie	"Under The Sea" Cake	Safe (DOTD)
Ali	"Magic Toadstool" Cake	Safe
Brogen	"Ice Dream Sundae" Cake	Safe
Daniel	"Banana from the Lego pole" Cake	Safe
Irene	"Buttercream Princess Fairy" Cake	Safe
Kate	"Monster" cake	Safe
Michael	"Red Velvet" Layer cake	Safe
Ashley	"Candy Lane" Cake	Bottom Two (Zumbo Test)
Vicki	"Swan" cake	Bottom Two (Zumbo Test)

Zumbo Test details
Contestant	Dessert	Scores (out of 10)		Total (out of 20)	Result
Contestant	Dessert	Zumbo	Rachel	Total (out of 20)	Result
Ashley	Zumbo's Back-to-school cake (made with chocolate, rice paper, puff pastry, cinnamon crunch, mascarpone, vanilla sponge & apple tartine)	7	7	14	Safe
Vicki	Zumbo's Back-to-school cake (made with chocolate, rice paper, puff pastry, cinnamon crunch, mascarpone, vanilla sponge & apple tartine)	5	5	10	Eliminated

=== Episode 5 - Defies Gravity ===
- Airdate — 30 August 2016
- Sweet Sensations — The Dessert Makers had to create a dessert that defies gravity
- Zumbo Test — The bottom two had to recreate Zumbo's Willy Wonka inspired dessert named "Hat Trick". The lower scoring contestant was eliminated.

Sweet Sensations details
Contestant	Dessert	Result
Ali	Chocolate Spheres with Peanut Caramel and Passionfruit Cream	Safe (DOTD)
Amie	Chocolate Irish Cream Pavlova	Safe
Ashley	Levitating Strawberry Shortcake	Safe
Brogen	Peppermint Mocha Gateaux	Safe
Daniel	Passion fruit and banana, dark chocolate mousse cake	Safe
Irene	Blueberry Mousse and White Chocolate Lavender Cream	Safe
Kate	Chai Tea With Spiced Profiteroles	Bottom Two (Zumbo Test)
Michael	Flying Fruit Flan	Bottom Two (Zumbo Test)

Zumbo Test details
Contestant	Dessert	Scores (out of 10)		Total (out of 20)	Result
Contestant	Dessert	Zumbo	Rachel	Total (out of 20)	Result
Kate	Hat Trick (made with chocolate, soft cheese filling, tomato jelly, sweet corn custard, chocolate chipotle ganache, avocado, sour cream mousse & taco corn chip coating)	5	6	11	Safe
Michael	Hat Trick (made with chocolate, soft cheese filling, tomato jelly, sweet corn custard, chocolate chipotle ganache, avocado, sour cream mousse & taco corn chip coating)	4	5	9	Eliminated

=== Episode 6 - Arnott's Biscuits ===
- Airdate — 5 September 2016
- Sweet Sensations — The dessert makers had to make Australia's favourite biscuit, Arnott's biscuit, into a delicious dessert.
- Zumbo Test — The bottom two had to recreate six out of 12 Zumbo created biscuits named "Epic Biscuit Time". The contestant who scored lowest was eliminated.

Sweet Sensations details
Contestant	Dessert	Result
Amie	Lemon Crisp Baked Cheesecake	Safe (DOTD)
Brogen	Monte Carlo Cheesecake	Safe
Daniel	Raspberry and coconut ice cream Vovo Verrine	Safe
Irene	Monte Carlo Macaron Ice Cream Sandwich	Safe
Kate	Deconstructed Venetian	Safe
Ali	Chocolate And Berry Royal Marshmallow Crown	Bottom Two (Zumbo Test)
Ashley	Kingston Tart With Golden Syrup Ice Cream	Bottom Two (Zumbo Test)

Zumbo Test details
Contestant	Dessert	Scores (out of 10)		Total (out of 20)	Result
Contestant	Dessert	Zumbo	Rachel	Total (out of 20)	Result
Ali	Epic Biscuit Time (Apple Crumble Khoo Hoots, Gianduja, Lamington Runway, Cinnamon Donut, Finger Bun Zumbotron, Salted Caramel Bell)	7	7	14	Safe
Ashley	Epic Biscuit Time (Apple Crumble Khoo Hoots, Gianduja, Lamington Runway, Cinnamon Donut, Finger Bun Zumbotron, Salted Caramel Bell)	6	6	12	Eliminated

=== Episode 7 - Flaming Dessert ===
- Airdate — 6 September 2016
- Sweet Sensations — The dessert makers had to create a dessert inspired by fire
- Zumbo Test — The bottom two had to recreate Zumbo's "Ice" Dessert. The lower scoring contestant was eliminated.

Sweet Sensations details
Contestant	Dessert	Result
Irene	Chilli Chocolate Ganache and Raspberry Sorbet	Safe (DOTD)
Brogen	Toasted Marshmallow Slice	Safe
Daniel	Chocolate and marshmallow Petit Gateau	Safe
Kate	Flaming Alaska	Safe
Ali	Anise and Poached Pear Bombe Alaska	Bottom Two (Zumbo Test)
Amie	Sticky Date Pudding With Spiced Figs	Bottom Two (Zumbo Test)

Zumbo Test details
Contestant	Dessert	Scores (out of 10)		Total (out of 20)	Result
Contestant	Dessert	Zumbo	Rachel	Total (out of 20)	Result
Ali	Zumbo's "Ice" Dessert (made with ginger & thyme icecream, thyme & ginger crumble, milk mousse, chocolate, white chocolate, lime Swiss meringue, lime granite)	8	9	17	Safe
Amie	Zumbo's "Ice" Dessert (made with ginger & thyme icecream, thyme & ginger crumble, milk mousse, chocolate, white chocolate, lime Swiss meringue, lime granite)	6	6	12	Eliminated

=== Episode 8 - Classic Aussie Dessert ===
- Airdate — 12 September 2016
- Sweet Sensations — The dessert makers had to create a reimagining of a classic Aussie dessert
- Zumbo Test — The bottom two had to recreate Zumbo's Frosty Fruit iceblock inspired dessert named "Frosty Fruit Tart". The lower scoring contestant was eliminated.

Sweet Sensations details
Contestant	Dessert	Result
Kate	Caramel Mousse Slice	Safe (DOTD)
Ali	Layered Lamington Gateau	Safe
Daniel	Pavlova Nest with strawberries with passion fruit cream and curd	Safe
Brogen	Vanilla and Passionfruit Slice	Bottom Two (Zumbo Test)
Irene	Pavlova with Kiwi Sorbet and Pineapple Chantilly Cream	Bottom Two (Zumbo Test)

Zumbo Test details
Contestant	Dessert	Scores (out of 10)		Total (out of 20)	Result
Contestant	Dessert	Zumbo	Rachel	Total (out of 20)	Result
Brogen	Frosty Fruit Tart (made with Shortbread Tart Shell, Tropical Compote, Orange & Passionfruit Gels, Seabreeze Mousse, Yellow Glaze, Frosty Fruit Sorbet & Saltwater Foam)	8	8	16	Safe
Irene	Frosty Fruit Tart (made with Shortbread Tart Shell, Tropical Compote, Orange & Passionfruit Gels, Seabreeze Mousse, Yellow Glaze, Frosty Fruit Sorbet & Saltwater Foam)	7	7	14	Eliminated

=== Episode 9 - Fruit Dessert ===
- Airdate — 13 September 2016
- Sweet Sensations — The dessert makers had to create a dessert inspired by fruit
- Zumbo Test — The bottom two had to recreate Zumbo's flower inspired dessert named "Nancy's Garden", named after Zumbo's mum. The lower scoring contestant was eliminated.

Sweet Sensations details
Contestant	Dessert	Result
Ali	Lemon Yoghurt Mousse with Pineapple Crème & Banana Ice-cream	Safe (DOTD)
Brogen	Watermelon & Red Berry Cake	Safe
Kate	Pear Green Apple & Lime Tart	Bottom Two (Zumbo Test)
Daniel	Mango, mandarin and orange Sphere	Bottom Two (Zumbo Test)

Zumbo Test details
Contestant	Dessert	Scores (out of 10)		Total (out of 20)	Result
Contestant	Dessert	Zumbo	Rachel	Total (out of 20)	Result
Kate	Nancy's Garden (made with grapefruit curd, panna cotta, cheesecake, yoghurt, geranium foam, leaves made of filo, shortbread, isomalt and chocolate, watermelon, grapefruit segments & watermelon sorbet)	8	9	17	Safe
Daniel	Nancy's Garden (made with grapefruit curd, panna cotta, cheesecake, yoghurt, geranium foam, leaves made of filo, shortbread, isomalt and chocolate, watermelon, grapefruit segments & watermelon sorbet)	6	7	13	Eliminated

=== Episode 10 - High Tea ===
- Airdate — 19 September 2016
- Sweet Sensations — The dessert makers had to create the most luxurious high tea, three portions of three different lavish and extravagant desserts. The top two contestants were sent to the Zumbo Test with the bottom contestant sent to the Semi-final
- Zumbo Test — The top two had to recreate Zumbo's dessert in form of a bathtub called Golden Duckie. The higher scoring contestant was given a golden ticket, sending them straight to the Grand Final. The lower scoring contestants were sent to the Semi-final

Sweet Sensations details
Contestant	Dessert	Result
Ali	Pistachio Cream Craquelin	Safe (Zumbo Test)
Ali	Earl Grey & Raspberry Almond Cake	Safe (Zumbo Test)
Ali	Caramel & Apple Petit Gateux	Safe (Zumbo Test)
Kate	Pistachio & Raspberry Cake	Safe (Zumbo Test)
Kate	Passionfruit & Lime Meringue Tart	Safe (Zumbo Test)
Kate	Opera cake	Safe (Zumbo Test)
Brogen	Lavender & Honey Macarons	Sent to Semi-final
Brogen	Coconut Panna Cotta Tarts	Sent to Semi-final
Brogen	Chocolate & Hazelnut Petit Gateux	Sent to Semi-final

Zumbo Test details
Contestant	Dessert	Scores (out of 10)		Total (out of 20)	Result
Contestant	Dessert	Zumbo	Rachel	Total (out of 20)	Result
Ali	Golden Duckie (Layered with steamed gingerbread pudding, passionfruit jelly, aerated honeycomb, chocolate, cocoa butter mousse, passionfruit ice cream, honeycomb, freeze dry passionfruit, salted butter, 24-carat chocolate duck & gingerbread bubbles)	8	8	16	Sent to Grand Final
Kate	Golden Duckie (Layered with steamed gingerbread pudding, passionfruit jelly, aerated honeycomb, chocolate, cocoa butter mousse, passionfruit ice cream, honeycomb, freeze dry passionfruit, salted butter, 24-carat chocolate duck & gingerbread bubbles)	7	7	14	Sent to Semi-final

=== Episode 11 - Semi-final ===
- Airdate — 20 September 2016
- Sweet Sensations — The dessert makers had to create a dessert that measured at least 30 cm high without any inedible structure included.
- Zumbo Test — The dessert makers had to recreate Zumbo's eight vanilla layered cake the size of a matchbox named "V8 Vanilla Cake". The higher scoring contestant was sent to the Grand Final, the lower scoring contestant was eliminated.

Sweet Sensations details
Contestant	Dessert	Scores (out of 10)		Total (out of 20)
Contestant	Dessert	Zumbo	Rachel	Total (out of 20)
Kate	Donut Tower	9	8	17
Brogen	Orange Chocolate and Espresso Caramel Entremet	7	7	14

Zumbo Test details
Contestant	Dessert	Scores (out of 10)		Total (out of 20)	Total Score (out of 40)	Result
Contestant	Dessert	Zumbo	Rachel	Total (out of 20)	Total Score (out of 40)	Result
Kate	V8 Vanilla Cake (layered with Vanilla Dacqouise, Vanilla Almond Crunch, Vanilla Ganache, Vanilla Chiffon, Vanilla Syrup, Vanilla Brulee, Vanilla Macaron, Vanilla Water Jelly, Vanilla Chantilly & Vanilla Glaze)	7	8	15	32	Sent to Grand Final
Brogen	V8 Vanilla Cake (layered with Vanilla Dacqouise, Vanilla Almond Crunch, Vanilla Ganache, Vanilla Chiffon, Vanilla Syrup, Vanilla Brulee, Vanilla Macaron, Vanilla Water Jelly, Vanilla Chantilly & Vanilla Glaze)	7	7	14	28	Third

=== Episode 12 - Grand Finale ===
- Airdate — 27 September 2016
- Detail — Unlike former episodes, the final two took part in the Zumbo Test first and the Sweet Sensations last.
- Final Zumbo Test — The final two contestants had to recreate Zumbo's dessert named "Sugar & Spice"
- Final Sweet Sensations — The final two had to create a dessert inspired by their favourite fairytale. The higher scoring contestant would be announced Winner of Zumbo's Just Desserts.

Zumbo Test details
Contestant	Dessert	Scores (out of 10)		Total (out of 20)	Result
Contestant	Dessert	Zumbo	Rachel	Total (out of 20)	Result
Ali	Sugar & Spice (made with Chocolate, Spiced Crunch, Honey Nougat, Brown Sugar Sponge, Pear Compote, Burnt Butter & Pear Mousse)	9	9	18	
Kate	Sugar & Spice (made with Chocolate, Spiced Crunch, Honey Nougat, Brown Sugar Sponge, Pear Compote, Burnt Butter & Pear Mousse)	7	8	15	

Sweet Sensations details
Contestant	Dessert	Scores (out of 10)		Total (out of 20)	Total Score (out of 40)	Result
Contestant	Dessert	Zumbo	Rachel	Total (out of 20)	Total Score (out of 40)	Result
Kate	"Snow White"; Layered Ice-Cream Apple with Sponge Log	9	9	18	33	Winner
Ali	"Jack And The Beanstalk"; Three Bean Entremet with Mandarin Egg Yolk	7	7	14	32	Runner-up
