= Dessert Masters =

Australian cooking game show

- Also known as: MasterChef: Dessert Masters
- Genre: Cooking; Reality
- Judges: Melissa Leong; Amaury Guichon
- Country of origin: Australia
- Original language: English
- No. of series: 2
- No. of episodes: 20

Production
- Production location: Melbourne
- Camera setup: Multi-camera
- Production company: Endemol Shine Australia

Original release
- Network: Network 10
- Release: 12 November 2023 – present

Related
- MasterChef Australia; MasterChef Australia: The Professionals

Dessert Masters, also known as MasterChef: Dessert Masters, is an Australian cooking reality show produced by Endemol Shine Australia which premiered on 12 November 2023 on Network 10. It is a spin-off of MasterChef Australia, itself an adaptation of the British MasterChef, and sees ten professional pastry chefs competing for a $100,000 prize. Former MasterChef Australia judge Melissa Leong and international pastry chef Amaury Guichon feature as judges.

Dessert Masters was announced at Network 10's upfronts in October 2022. Before the first series premiered, a second series was also commissioned for 2024, with Leong and Guichon returning. Series two premiered on 14 October 2024.

== Format and reception ==
The competition follows a similar structure to MasterChef Australia, with challenges testing technical skills, creativity, and time management under high-pressure conditions. Contestants are required to produce restaurant-quality desserts, ranging from plated dishes to large-scale showpieces. The show has been praised for elevating pastry arts in mainstream television, with critics highlighting Guichon’s expertise and the contestants’ innovation.

== Contestants ==
=== Series 1 ===
The full cast for the first series was announced on 4 June 2023.

| Contestant | Status |
|---|---|
| Gareth Whitton | Winner 28 November |
| Reynold Poernomo | Runner-up 28 November |
| Jess Liemantara | Third place 28 November |
| Kay-Lene Tan | Eliminated 27 November |
| Kirsten Tibballs | Eliminated 27 November |
| Andy Bowdy | Eliminated 26 November |
| Anna Polyviou | Eliminated 26 November |
| Adriano Zumbo | Eliminated 21 November |
| Morgan Hipworth | Eliminated 19 November |
| Rhiann Mead | Eliminated 14 November |

=== Series 2 ===
Part of the cast for the second series was announced in May 2024 then the rest of the cast was announced on 15 August 2024.

| Contestant | Status |
|---|---|
| John Demetrios | Winner 24 November |
| Emelia Jackson | Runner-up 24 November |
| Christy Tania | Third place 24 November |
| Reece Hignell | Eliminated 18 November |
| Jana Lai | Eliminated 18 November |
| Alisha Henderson | Eliminated 17 November |
| Darren Purchese | Eliminated 17 November |
| Dan Pasquali | Eliminated 11 November |
| Donato Toce | Eliminated 4 November |
| Katherine Sabbath | Eliminated 28 October |

== Episodes and ratings ==
Colour key:
– Highest rating during the series
– Lowest rating during the series

=== Series 1 ===
| Ep#/Wk-Ep# | Original airdate | Episode title / event | Total viewers (five metro cities) | Nightly ranking |
Week 1
| 1/01-1 | Sunday, 12 November 2023 | Series Premiere: Your Dessert Masterpiece Immunity Pin Challenge — Ten of the best pastry chefs in Australia gathered in the MasterChef kitchen for the inaugural season of Dessert Masters, where they would compete for the Dessert Masters title and $100,000. In their first challenge, they were tasked with creating a dessert masterpiece, a dish describing themselves, in three hours. Kirsten took the risk of making a pistachio and raspberry entremet, despite Amaury saying that he would not do that in this particular challenge. Her risk paid off and her dessert was among the top three, while Andy's roasted fennel cake impressed the judges. However, Reynold's "Monochrome" was deemed flawless by Melissa, and Reynold won the first and only immunity pin of the season. Like in Masterchef Australia, the pin could save him from elimination at any point, up until the semi final. | 477,000 | #6 |
| 2/01-2 | Monday, 13 November 2023 | Deception Immunity Challenge — Amaury showed off some of his desserts, which looked real but were made with chocolate. The chefs had three hours to make a deceptive dessert, with the winner of the challenge receiving immunity from the upcoming elimination challenge. During the last five minutes, Gareth's coffee cup cracked and fell apart, and he was forced to present it as is, but it tasted better than it looked. Andy's "Bound For the Bin" and Anna's hot dog were the top two, and since the judges couldn't decide which dessert was better, Andy and Anna both won immunity. | 477,000 | #10 |
| 3/01-3 | Tuesday, 14 November 2023 | Smashing Desserts Elimination Challenge — Amaury showed a video of him making a piñata out of chocolate. The chefs other than Andy and Anna were given two-and-a-half hours to prepare a smashed dessert. Reynold's "For Snow White", Adriano's interactive egg dessert and Gareth's sugar dome-covered chocolate and mugicha cake with macadamia were deemed the top three and were safe. Kay-Lene's lychee and raspberry meringue and Kirsten's piggy bank were praised by the judges, while Morgan's "Forbidden Fruit" tasted good but lacked refinement. Jess and Rhiann were named the bottom two. Towards the end of the challenge, Jess decided to make a chocolate raspberry disc for her chocolate berry caramel tart, but the smash was underwhelming. Like Kirsten, Rhiann presented a piggy bank; however it was too thick and thus did not smash well and Amaury felt the dessert lacked finesse and refinement. The judges agreed that Jess's flavour combinations were good enough to save her and Rhiann became the first chef to be eliminated. | 451,000 | 8 |
| 4/01-4 | Wednesday, 15 November 2023 | Team Relay — The chefs were split into three teams of three: the Blue team (Gareth, Kay-Lene and Morgan); Green (Andy, Anna and Reynold) and Orange (Adriano, Jess and Kirsten). They had to compose a dessert featuring maple syrup in two-and-a-quarter hours (forty-five minutes per team member), plus an additional thirty seconds to relay the information to the next teammate. Gareth, Anna and Adriano, as the captains and the first to cook for their respective teams, had to conceptualize the dish. The Green team's only problem was Reynold's failure to take Andy's chocolate crumb from the oven. In the Blue team, Kay-Lene struggled with Gareth's choice of dessert and Morgan was confused with the concept and needed more instructions. Meanwhile, the Orange team's Jess struggled with Adriano's abstract concept, and by the last changeover, the team still hadn't defined their concept. Kirsten, the last cook, salvaged it by making a chocolate brownie, and while the dessert was beautifully crafted, it contained too many elements and lacked cohesiveness. The Blue team's pumpkin, maple and pecan dessert was tasty, but it was no match for the Green team's "Textures of Maple and Passionfruit", and Andy, Anna and Reynold won immunity. | 372,000 | #11 |
Week 2
| 5/02-1 | Sunday, 19 November 2023 | Frozen Mystery Box Elimination Challenge — The chefs besides Andy, Anna and Reynold were presented with a frozen mystery box (the only one this season), which included rosella, chilli, beetroot and berry liqueur. They were tasked with creating a frozen dessert featuring at least one frozen element, in two-and-a-half hours. Kay-Lene's "Lara", inspired by her mentor, Andres Lara, was deemed the best dessert that Amaury tasted so far in the competition and she was declared safe. Kirsten, Gareth and Jess also impressed with their creations, despite Jess burning her first batch of beetroot tuile. The lack of frozen elements in Adriano's mini popcorn carton left the judges unsure whether it met the brief. However Morgan overused the berry liqueur in making the sorbet for his peach Melba. The sorbet, which was the frozen element, melted in front of the judges, sealing Morgan's elimination. | 342,000 | #12 |
| 6/02-2 | Monday, 20 November 2023 | Chocolate Immunity Challenge — Continuing from the previous episode, Amaury said that he would work all night to make one of his creations, to be unveiled in this episode. The result was a koala sculpture made entirely from chocolate. The chefs were given two-and-a-half to make a sensational chocolate dessert. They produced exemplary desserts, despite some minor criticisms. Gareth and Kirsten were selected as the top two. Gareth's elevated Black Forest tart with Kirsch and vanilla ice cream impressed the judges, but Kirsten's incredible chocolate and coffee caviar with white chocolate Melba toast had the edge, and Kirsten won the final immunity of the season. | 449,000 | #10 |
| 7/02-3 | Tuesday, 21 November 2023 | Inspired by Cinema Elimination Challenge — The chefs except Kirsten had two-and-a-half hours to create a dessert inspired by one of the movies on the board. Adriano and Gareth selected Grease, Andy chose The Godfather, Reynold picked Star Trek, Jess opted for Transformers, Anna picked Breakfast at Tiffany's and Kay-Lene chose Pretty in Pink. Jess's Humblebee was declared the best and she was safe. Gareth and Andy impressed the judges with their desserts, and while Reynold struggled during the challenge and his dessert lacked his usual finesse, his textures and flavours were deemed flawless and he was also declared safe. The bottom three were Adriano, Anna and Kay-Lene. The concept and flavours of Kay-Lene's pink peppercorn and strawberry pavlova were good, but her champagne jelly was grainy in texture. Anna's high tea was delicious and looked elegant, but the judges argued whether or not she hit the brief. While Adriano's chocolate cup with strawberry ice-cream was delicious, the cup itself had structural issues. Although Adriano's dish was inspired, the time constraint prevented his vision from coming together and he was eliminated. | 412,000 | #10 |
Week 3 (Finale Week)
| 8/03-1 | Sunday, 26 November 2023 | Christmas Double Elimination Challenge — Curtis Stone entered the MasterChef kitchen as Santa Claus with a bag of goodies, distributing different fruits to the chefs, who were asked to make a Christmas-inspired dessert using the assigned fruit in two hours. The bottom two performers would be sent home. During the challenge, Reynold, who was given passionfruit, struggled with the sugar glass sphere for his Christmas bauble, and he nailed his third sphere, but he caused it to shatter by trying to fill it with cream, forcing him to play his immunity pin and advance to the semi final. Kay-Lene, who received bananas, took a risk by making a roasted banana cake. Despite the cake nearly collapsing, it received praise from all the judges. Assigned raspberries, lemon, and apples respectively, Jess, Kirsten and Gareth also impressed. Andy and Anna's attempts at making a trifle with strawberries and blackberries respectively, had minor errors, with Andy's being criticized for a lack of complexity, particularly in the presentation, and Anna's being criticized for the frozen gel, and her decision to serve it in a champagne glass for the judges was perceived as lacking in generosity. Those errors resulted in their eliminations. | 441,000 | #7 |
| 9/03-2 | Monday, 27 November 2023 | Semi Final — In a double elimination semi final, the final five chefs were given three hours to create a dessert inspired by nature. Everybody performed well in the challenge, except Kirsten. During the last 10 seconds, her birdcage, which was the most integral element, collapsed, forcing her to serve her chocolate and passionfruit entremet as is. The judges felt that Kirsten's dessert was incomplete and Kay-Lene's was imbalanced, and they were eliminated, leaving Gareth, Jess and Reynold to compete in the grand finale. | 471,000 | #7 |
| 10/03-3 | Tuesday, 28 November 2023 | Grand Finale — The finalists were tasked with preparing a two-course dessert meal for the judges and 15 guests. They had to serve their first course in four hours. Jess received 12 points for her strawberries and cream dessert (6 points from each judge), and 15 points for her "Pink Petal", finishing in third place with a total of 27. Reynold's "Floral" and "Milk and Honey" scored 15 and 13 points to finish in second place. Gareth's rhubarb tart and chocolate and wattleseed mousse with pistachio and Armagnac earned 17 and 18 points respectively, winning the competition with a total of 35. | 465,000 | #10 |
| 10/03-3 | Tuesday, 28 November 2023 | Winner Announced – Gareth Whitton won the Dessert Masters title and $100,000 grand prize. | 556,000 | #8 |

=== Series 2 ===
| Ep#/Wk-Ep# | Original airdate | Episode title / event | Total viewers | Nightly ranking |
Week 1
| 1/01-1 | Monday, 14 October 2024 | Series Premiere: Your Dessert Masterpiece Secret SOS Box Challenge - Ten new pastry chefs were invited to the MasterChef kitchen to compete for a $100,000 prize and the Dessert Masters title. In their first challenge, they were given three hours to prepare their dessert masterpiece. Jana's "Tunnel Vision" and John's coconut and lime dessert were the top two, and John won the secret SOS box, which would grant him a hidden advantage during a future challenge. | 467,000 | #10 |
| 2/02-2 | Monday, 21 October 2024 | Movement Immunity Challenge - The chefs had two-and-a-half hours to create a dish featuring movement. All of the desserts were impressive, but the judges were blown away by Christy's Rubik's Cube, and she won immunity. | 366,000 | #15 |
| 3/03-3 | Monday, 28 October 2024 | Smoke and Mirrors Mystery Box Elimination Challenge - The chefs other than Christy were given two-and-a-half hours to make a deceptive dessert. Jana's Vegemite jar, Alisha's carrot cake with white chocolate cabbage leaves and Darren's avocado toast, which was deemed his best dish so far in the competition, were the top three and safe. The bottom three were Donato, Katherine and Reece. Donato's optical illusion for his dessert was not affected as it could have been. Katherine's desert lime sandcastle cheesecake was bland. Reece's burnt honey cake was dry. This challenge came down to two main factors: the brief and taste. The judges agreed that no matter how well the contestants met the brief, it always comes down to flavours. Although Katherine's dish met the brief, they couldn't get over those flavours and she was eliminated. | #13 | |
Week 2
| 4/02-1 | Sunday, 3 November 2024 | Team Relay – The chefs were divided into teams of three: the Green team (Donato, John, and Reece); Pink (Christy, Dan, and Darren) and Purple (Alisha, Emelia, and Jana). They were given two-and-a-quarter hours (forty-five minutes per team member) to create a dessert highlighting ricotta cheese. The Green team's ricotta and orange cake with ricotta gelato was delicious, and John forgot to plate Reece's tuile and the dish lacked crunchiness. The Pink team's "Ricotta Cheesecake Madness" and the Purple's team's version of French toast were both impressive, but ultimately Alisha, Emelia and Jana won immunity. | 331,000 | #12 |
| 5/02-2 | Monday, 4 November 2024 | Australian Country Classics Elimination Challenge – The chefs other than Alisha, Emelia, and Jana had two-and-a-half hours to reinvent an Austrian country classic using locally produced apples or blueberries. Christy's "Golden Delicious" custard tart and Dan's blueberry lamington were the best dishes and were safe. The judges liked Darren's mille-feuille but found the smoked cream distracting. However, while the elements of Donato's scone and jam sundae were well made, the dish as a whole was imbalanced and he was eliminated. | 311,000 | #21 |
Week 3
| 6/03-1 | Sunday, 10 November 2024 | Theatre Immunity Challenge – The chefs were tasked with creating a dessert inspired by theatre in two-and-a-half hours. Christy's Black Forest gateau and Emelia's tarte tatin were the top two, and in a close decision, both won immunity. | 299,000 | #13 |
| 7/03-2 | Monday, 11 November 2024 | Culinary Techniques Elimination Challenge – Amaury demonstrated four of his signature pastry techniques, and the chefs other than Christy and Emelia were given two-and-a-half hours to prepare a dessert incorporating one of those techniques. John fell behind in making the carnation flower for his "Alter Ego" and played the SOS box, receiving an additional 20 minutes of cooking time, and his dessert was the dish of the day. Dan and Reece were the bottom two. Reece's tiramisu tart was visually appealing but lacked in flavour. Dan's coconut, mango, and passionfruit cake was delicious but lacked refinement and the judges felt he failed to meet the brief, resulting in his elimination. | 369,000 | #16 |
Week 4
| 8/04-1 | Sunday, 17 November 2024 | Fizzy Drink Mystery Box Elimination Challenge – The chefs had two-and-a-half hours to make an aerated dessert featuring a Schweppes fizzy drink flavour of their choice. Reece's blood orange sorbet with vanilla gelato and Jana's raspberry and white chocolate dessert received praised from the judges, while John and Christy also impressed. Alisha's crumpet was dense and fatty and Darren's rice crispies were texturally flawed and they were both eliminated. | 353,000 | #13 |
| 9/04-2 | Monday, 18 November 2024 | Semi Final – The semi-finalists were given three-and-a-half hours to create three desserts that tell a story. Jana's pastel de nata was overly sweet, while Reece's rum baba and potato stack were dry and lacked flavour. They were eliminated, leaving John, Christy, and Emelia as the finalists. | 349,000 | #15 |
Week 5 (Grand Finale)
| 10/05-1 | Sunday, 24 November 2024 | Grand Finale – The finalists were asked to prepare a two-course dessert meal, revolving around the colours green and gold, for the judges and three guests: Season 1 contestants Adriano Zumbo, Kirsten Tibballs and Gareth Whitton. They had to serve the first course in four hours. Christy received 16 points for her kiwi mojito and 14 points for her Australian gold for a total of 30 points and a third-place finish. Emelia's apple entremet and Paris-Brest each scored 18 points to finish in second place. John's white chocolate and fig leaf dessert and "Eureka" both earned 19 points, winning the competition with 38 points. | 415,000 | #15 |

== Adaptations ==
=== Brazil ===
A Brazilian version of the series was commissioned in August 2024, named MasterChef Confeitaria. The series was produced by Endemol Shine Brasil and premiered on Band in November 2024.

== See also ==
- List of Australian television series
- List of cooking shows
