= MasterChef Australia: The Professionals =

- Genre: Reality, cooking
- Presented by: Matt Preston; Marco Pierre White
- Judges: Matt Preston; Marco Pierre White
- Narrated by: Lofty Fulton
- Theme music composer: The Script
- Opening theme: "Hall of Fame"
- Country of origin: Australia
- Original language: English
- No. of seasons: 1
- No. of episodes: 25

Production
- Production location: Melbourne Showgrounds
- Running time: 60 minutes
- Production company: Shine Australia

Original release
- Network: Network Ten
- Release: 20 January – 17 March 2013

Related
- MasterChef Australia All-Stars

MasterChef Australia: The Professionals is an Australian cooking television show, based on the original BBC MasterChef: The Professionals. It aired on Network Ten from 20 January to 17 March 2013. The show was won by Rhys Badcock.

== Contestants ==
Contestant	Age	State	Status
Rhys Badcock	29	NSW	Winner (50 points)
Rhett Willis	33	QLD	Runners-Up (48 points)
Sarah Knights	27	NSW	Runners-Up (48 points)
Michael Demagistris	31	VIC	Eliminated 12 March
Nathan Brindle	23	NSW	Eliminated 11 March
Bonny Porter	23	NSW	Eliminated 10 March
Nick Whitehouse	41	NSW	Eliminated 5 March
Luke Southwood	43	NSW	Eliminated 3 March
Coop Woodstone	37	NSW	Eliminated 24 February
Cassie Delves	19	NSW	Eliminated 19 February
Cameron Bailey	26	NSW	Eliminated 12 February
Akuc Isaac Chol	27	NSW	Eliminated 10 February
Tracey Holderness	47	NSW	Eliminated 5 February
Kylie McAllester	27	VIC	Eliminated 3 February
Kiah Blanco	27	QLD	Eliminated 29 January
Chrissie Flanagan	33	NSW	Eliminated 27 January
Anthony Bantoft	33	QLD	Eliminated 22 January
Matty McKenzie	25	QLD	Eliminated 20 January

== Episodes ==
Episodes	Tasks/Events
1	Matt Preston introduced the contestants to his co-judge, Chef Marco Pierre White. The professionals were divided into six groups of three chefs each and were given the challenge to feed 120 people, including their family members. They were given two and a half hours to cook. As White kept an eye on the professionals, Preston sat with customers for the tasting of the dishes, which included duck, yabbies, tortellini, pastry and tartare. In the end, Cassidy won immunity from the next elimination, while Matty was eliminated.
2	On the second day the professionals were called outside the kitchen at the Federation Square in Melbourne where they would be cooking. At the Square both the chefs were waiting. The chefs told them that they will be serving their dishes at a pop-up restaurant on the trams in Melbourne. In this challenge they had to make an entree, main course and dessert. Then they were divided into two teams, Red and Green, led by Nick Whitehouse and Rhett Willis, respectively. Cassie sat with the judges and tasted the dishes as she had performed very well previously. Red Team started their dishes without organizing themselves, which caused problems, but the Green Team proceeded smoothly. Red Team made breaded scallop with carrot puree as entree, quail with breast for main course, and berry roulade for the dessert, while Green Team made Asian-style beef tartare, pork and prawn boudin, and poached meringue roulade. Based on the passengers' votes, the Red Team was declared the winner, and Green Team must face elimination.
3	As Green Team lost previously they have to face the elimination. This time the professionals were given two hours to cook dishes that represented them as individuals. Sarah made squid ink paparadella; Rhys, pan-fried lobster; Rhett, chili roasted Whiting with som tam salad; Anthony, seafood five ways; Chrissie, blueberry and almond tart; and Akuc, lentil soup with beetroot puree and capsicum, Kylie, rabbit salad with radish and tumbleweed potatoes, while Nathan opted for lamb's brains. Akuc cooked the dish of the day, while Anthony was eliminated.
4	As the professionals enter the kitchen, they face both chefs standing with a huge knife block in front of them. This time the professionals have their first reinvention challenge. Written on each knife in the set is the name of one 'Take Away' classical dish. Matt Preston gives examples by picking two knives, one with Curry and the other Pizza. As Akuc performed extremely well on the previous challenge, she was given the chance to select the one classical dish that all the professionals would be cooking, she picks Fish and Chips. They were given 90 minutes for reinventing this dish. Akuc and Chrissie were struggling throughout the challenge. Rhett cooked the dish of the day and was in the top three with Rhys and Cassie. Akuc and Chrissie were in the bottom two with Chrissie being eliminated for overcooking her fish, overpowering it with dill, and failing to reinterpret the dish.
5	This time the professionals had to make a wedding cake in three hours, as created by guest chef and judge Adriano Zumbo, who's known as the dark lord of pastry. The cake had eleven layers with different flavours. The professionals were divided into three teams, Brown, Red and Green led by Luke, Tracey and Michael respectively. This time they didn't have to bother about picking the ingredients by themselves, but were given the correct ones that the cake required. There was tension between Red team's members, Tracey and Cameron. In the end, Luke's team (Brown) was declared the winner leaving the other two teams to face an elimination round.
6	This time the professionals have the same team and captain as previously, Tracey with the Red and Michael with the Green. They have to prepare an entree, main course and dessert set differently for each team by the judges and making enough to feed 120 guests in one and a half hours. Matt dined with the guests while Marco remained with the professionals running the kitchen. The Red team cooked pasta for the entree, beef for the main course and a chocolate fondant for dessert while Green team went with lamb as the entree, Mulloway as main course and a soufflé as dessert. The winning team, brown, from the wedding cake challenge gets a chance to sit with Matt and taste the dishes. Red team wins the challenge and Kiah is eliminated from the losing Green team, for undercooking the soufflés.
7	Again the professionals were given the task of reinventing a classical dish, Sunday Roast, which was chosen by Rhys from the knife block. Tracey seemed confused the whole time and didn't know what to do in order to reinvent the dish. Other professionals had similar problems. Akuc changed her dish from pork to chicken, after questioning from the judges. Rhett, Sarah and Nick were in the top three, Nick winning the dish of the day for his better reinterpretation of the classical dish while Akuc, Kylie and Tracey were in the bottom three. Kylie was eliminated because her pork crackling was not crispy enough.
8	In this episode there were three quick-fire rounds. Round one of 30 minutes to cook duck as the core ingredient, round two of 20 minutes to cook vegetables as the core ingredient and the last round of 10 minutes for cooking shellfish as their core ingredient. From each round two professionals were eliminated. From round one, Bonny and Luke were eliminated, round two, Cassie and Rhett were eliminated and from round three, Michael and Tracey were eliminated. These six professionals must face elimination in the next show.
9	This episode welcomed one of the best chefs from Australia, Jacques Reymond along with his team. Thus the professionals had to face them forming their own team. Michael was the head chef of the professionals' brigade. For the first time Marco wasn't with the professionals to run the kitchen. The winner was decided by the guests' votes. The professional chefs had to make an entree, main course and dessert. They chose to cook swordfish as the entree, roast veal as the main course and meringue for dessert while Jacques and his brigade chose to cook ocean trout as the entree, wallaby as the main course and a rich, multifaceted dessert. Jacques suffered timing problems due to having to clean the scampi of their poo chutes, which was a part of their entree, whereas concerning the professionals' entree, swordfish, the judges complained that the portion served was too small. In the end, Jacques got 16 votes for his entree, 22 for the main course and 12 for the dessert in comparison to 9 votes for entree, 3 votes for main course and 13 votes for the professionals' dessert. As a result, the professionals lost to Jacques' brigade and Tracey was eliminated for being the worst performer and overcooking the veal.
10	Again, it was a reinvention test to cook a classical dessert, pavlova, chosen by Coop from the professionals' knife block set. Given two hours to complete the dish, Sarah, Cassie and Cameron won the dish of the day because there were no faults in any of their dishes. Akuc, Bonny and Coop were in the bottom three and Akuc was eliminated for not actually reinventing pavalova.
11	This was professionals' First Mystery box challenge, the box contained garbage which could be found in any domestic kitchen, which included potato skins, chicken fat and skin, overripe tomatoes, fruit peelings, fish heads, etc. The professionals have to make a dish from the garbage, given one hour to complete their dish. Rhett, Sarah and Nathan were in top three with Rhett, winning dish of the day while Nick, Cassie, Michael and Cameron were in bottom four. Michael and Cameron cooked the worst dishes and therefore they have to face the elimination round the next time.
12	In this episode Michael and Cameron were asked to prepare a three course menu and serve it by themselves to 120 guests. Both the contestants were equally challenged. Michael prepared a prawn salad for entree and Cameron prepared a crab salad. For the main course Cameron prepared beef and Michael prepared slow braised lamb. Final course Michael did a deconstructed lemon meringue pie and Cameron prepared Panna cotta. Throughout the service Michael struggled and needed help from Cameron. In the end they were judged based on their preparation, strategy and the diner's satisfaction. Cameron was eliminated.
13	The remaining 10 professionals leave the MC kitchen and visit Victoria high country to feed 50 horse riders there. The professionals were divided into two teams. The Red team with Coop, Nathan, Luke and Bonny led by Sarah whereas the Green team was with Rhett, Cassie, Michael and Nick led by Rhys. This time they don't have any modern machinery or technology and had to depend on traditional and old equipment provided. They had to prepare an entree, a main course and a dessert, and were given three hours to do so. Matt and Marco did not decide the fate of professionals but the horse riders' votes. The Red team (despite the pin bones in their trout) won by 31 votes as compared to 27 votes for the Green team.
14	The winning Red team was called into the MC kitchen. Despite their previous win, they also had to cook and one of them must face the elimination challenge with the Green team during the next episode. In the beginning all five professionals had to identify 40 ingredients present in a classic dish Laksa. Bonny was saved by identifying the most. The rest of the professionals had to cook using only the identified ingredients. Coop lost because of his poor cooking.
15	It's again a service challenge elimination round. Each of the professional chefs had to cook an entree, a main course and a dessert to feed 120 people. Rhys' cheesecake was deemed the dish of the day. Cassie was eliminated because she not only burnt her chocolate soufflé, but had also overcooked the duck.
16	The final nine professionals face a reinvention test consisting of having to fuse two world cuisines. The cuisines chosen were Moroccan and Mexican by Nick and Luke respectively, and the professionals were given 90 minutes to complete the job. Quite a few of the chefs struggled with the test, due to a lack of knowledge of the cuisines. Luke, Bonny and Nick were in the top 3 with Bonny getting the dish of the day. Coop, Rhett and Michael were in the bottom 3 and ultimately Coop had to leave because his dish of quail stuffed with couscous failed to fuse the two cuisines.
17	It's a new day and a new team challenge not in the MC Kitchen but at a beautiful garden in Melbourne where they had to prepare canapés for 50 locals. The winning team will compete for an immunity for one of its teammates which means that whoever wins will almost certainly be going into the finals week. They weren't given any food or ingredients but had to forage from around the neighbourhood. The two teams were Red with Nick, Sarah, Rhys led by Nathan and Green team with Luke, Rhett, Michael led by Bonny. They had five hours to forage, prep, cook and serve their dishes. The red team won by 29 votes as compared to 21 votes for the Green team.
18	This time it's a service challenge where the professionals had to deal with Italian cuisine. Rhys with captain Nathan are in the Red team and Sarah with Nick as captain are in the Green team. One of them will get the immunity which will lead them into finale week. This challenge was judged by guest chef Stefano de Pieri and another 120 Italian critics. As usual they had to make an entree, main course and a dessert. Red team chose Orecchiette as the entree, veal loin with squid ink bread sauce for the main course and a citrus terrine for dessert whereas the Green team chose Tuna crudo for the entree, casarecce pasta with rabbit for main course and yoghurt Panna Cotta as dessert. In the end, Sarah took the immunity badge for her excellence in cooking and running the kitchen even though she wasn't the captain of her team.
19	It's a new reinvention test put up by guest chef Shannon Bennett. Again a dish was selected from the knife block, and Sarah chose Rabbit Stew to reinvent. Despite her immunity, she chose to cook. Rhys, Sarah and Michael were in top three (with each being the dish of the day for the three judges) whereas Luke, Bonny and Rhett were in bottom three. Luke's rabbit braised in red wine, did not show any reinvention and thus, he was eliminated.
20	The professionals are tasked to replicate Snapper Viennoise with Sabayon of Grain Mustard, cooked by guest chef Curtis Stone. With no recipes and no notes, the chefs had to memorize the dish cooked at first sight and reproduce it to the best of their abilities. Michael, Rhett and Rhys were in the top three with Rhys winning the best dish.
21	In this week's restaurant service challenge, guest chef Donovan Cooke runs the pass. Sarah chose not to use the immunity pin (which she won in Episode 18), allowing Rhys (who won the previous challenge) to sit out of the service. The Green team consisted of Sarah, Nathan, and Bonny. The Red team consisted of Rhett, Michael and Nick. They were tasked to cooked 6 dishes for 120 people. Both teams struggled throughout the challenge, but Sarah led the Green Team to be the better performing side, and cooked the most well received dish. Nick was the worst performer on the Red team and was eliminated.
22	In the mystery box challenge, the professionals were given expensive luxury ingredients (champagne, abalone, white truffle, caviar, chocolate) to use as a main ingredient in creating any dish they want. Sarah, Nathan and Michael were in the top three, with Michael winning dish of the day. Bonny was eliminated.
23	It's a pressure test this week, where the professionals have to cook guest chef Peter Gilmore's Fragrant Poached Chicken with Sea Scallops and Smoked Eggplant Cream. The professionals are given two and a half hours to prepare the technically challenging dish's components, and a separate fifteen minutes to plate their dishes accordingly. Rhys micromanaged his ingredients the best, and won dish of the day. By not following the technical subtleties and balance of the given recipe, Nathan was eliminated.
24	The final four professionals are tasked with a two versus two team service challenge. This week's test involves each team setting up a pop up restaurant from scratch to serve two entrées, two mains, and one dessert, for 60 guests in just one day. Green team consisted of Rhys and Sarah, Red team was made up of Rhett and Michael. The Green team chose a European style menu and cooked Seared Scallops with Sweetcorn Purée, and Mushroom Tortellini with Sage Beurre Noisette for their entrées, Steamed Baby Snapper with Carrot Purée, and Lamb Loin with Fondant Potato for their mains, and Chocolate Feuilletine Cake for their dessert. The Red team went with a modern Asian theme and cooked Salt and Pepper Quail with Pickled Cucumber, and Sashimi of Tuna and Kingfish with Wasabi and Soy Sauce for their entrées, Chargrilled Swordfish with Green Papaya and Chili Jam and Braised Pork Belly with Star Anise Broth for their mains, and Lemongrass Panna Cotta for their dessert. Green team had issues with service as their dishes were difficult to prepare and serve. While Red team's service was quick, their dishes lacked technical complexity. In the end, Michael was eliminated because he allowed Rhett to lead the team throughout the day, and did not voice his concerns over the menu.
25	The grand finale consists of three rounds. The first round is a reinvention test with guest chef David Chang's favorite ingredients. Miso, Egg, and Chicken are chosen to be the main ingredients for the reinvention test. Rhys cooked Miso and Nori Crêpe with Tamarind Broth, Sarah made Quail Scotch Egg with Miso Glazed Chicken and Celery Salt, Rhett produced Tea Smoked Poached Chicken with Miso and Orange Mayonnaise. Rhys scored 17 points, Sarah with 17, and Rhett with 19. The second round is a pressure test, where the finalists have to cook Marco Pierre White's Terrine of Leeks and Lobster. Rhys scored 17, Sarah with 15, and Rhett with 12. The third round is a service challenge, where the professionals have to design a full menu with entrée, main and dessert for 120 guests, who are all professional chefs, including most of the guest chefs from previous episodes. The 3 finalists were asked to choose two assistants from all the other 15 contestants. Brown team consisted of Rhys with Kiah and Cassie; Green team consisted of Sarah with Nathan and Coop; and Red team consisted of Rhett with Michael and Nick. Rhys made Seared Scallops with Black Pudding, Lamb Loin with Carrot Purée and Buttered Spinach, and Warm Chocolate Cake with Vanilla Bean Ice Cream. Sarah made Grilled Prawns with Chorizo and Zucchini, Roasted Beef Bavette with Parsnip Purée and Bone Marrow, and Crème Chiboust with Stone Fruit and Sorbet. Rhett made Butter Poached Lobster with Celery Leaves and Sorrel, Lamb Rack with Baby Mushroom Ragout, and Eton Mess with Passion fruit and Crispy Meringue. Rhys scored 16 (for a total of 50), Sarah with 16 (for a total of 48), and Rhett with 17 (for a total of 48.) Therefore, Rhys wins the title of Masterchef, 200,000 dollars and a world tour working in celebrated kitchens. Sarah and Rhett are also awarded a cash prize, of 10,000 dollars each.

== Guest chefs ==
- Adriano Zumbo
- Jacques Reymond
- Stefano de Pieri
- Peter Gilmore
- Shannon Bennett
- Donovan Cooke
- Curtis Stone
- David Chang

== Ratings ==
Colour key:
– Highest rating during the series
– Lowest rating during the series

Week	Episode		Original airdate	Timeslot	Viewers (in millions)	Rank (Night)	Source
1	1	"All-in Service Challenge"	20 January 2013	Sunday 7:00 pm	1,165,000	#3	
1	2	"Guerrilla-style Pop-up"	21 January 2013	Monday 7:30 pm	1,019,000	#5	
1	3	"Last Chance Invention Test"	22 January 2013	Tuesday 7:30 pm	1,020,000	#4	
2	4	"Re-Invention Test"	27 January 2013	Sunday 7:00 pm	718,000	#10	
2	5	"Pressure Test"	28 January 2013	Monday 7:30 pm	892,000	#10	
2	6	"Restaurant Challenge"	29 January 2013	Tuesday 7:30 pm	729,000	#10	
3	7	"Sunday Roast Re-Invention Test"	3 February 2013	Sunday 7:00 pm	1,124,000	#5	
3	8	"Quick Fire Skills Test"	4 February 2013	Monday 7:30 pm	627,000	#19	
3	9	"Restaurant Challenge"	5 February 2013	Tuesday 7:30 pm	533,000	#20	
4	10	"The Classic Re-Invention Test"	10 February 2013	Sunday 7:00 pm	1,028,000	#8	
4	11	"Mystery Box"	11 February 2013	Monday 7:30 pm	—N/a	—N/a	
4	12	"Restaurant Service Challenge"	12 February 2013	Tuesday 7:30 pm	—N/a	—N/a	
5	13	"Off-site Challenge"	17 February 2013	Sunday 7:00 pm	859,000	#11	
5	14	"Immunity Super Invention Test"	18 February 2013	Monday 7:30 pm	—N/a	—N/a	
5	15	"Double Service Challenge"	19 February 2013	Tuesday 7:30 pm	—N/a	—N/a	
6	16	"International Invention Test"	24 February 2013	Sunday 7:00 pm	893,000	#9	
6	17	"Off-site Challenge"	25 February 2013	Monday 7:30 pm	—N/a	—N/a	
6	18	"Three-course Italian Service Challenge"	26 February 2013	Tuesday 7:30 pm	—N/a	—N/a	
7	19	"The Classic Re-invention Test"	3 March 2013	Sunday 7:00 pm	852,000	#9	
7	20	"Pressure Test"	4 March 2013	Monday 7:30 pm	—N/a	—N/a	
7	21	"Restaurant Service Challenge"	5 March 2013	Tuesday 7:30 pm	—N/a	—N/a	
8	22	"Luxury Mystery Box"	10 March 2013	Sunday 7:00 pm	721,000	#14	
8	23	"Pressure Test"	11 March 2013	Monday 7:30 pm	—N/a	—N/a	
8	24	"Off-site Challenge: Pop-up Restaurant"	12 March 2013	Tuesday 7:30 pm	888,000	—N/a	
9	25	"The Finale"	17 March 2013	Sunday 7:00 pm	980,000	#11	
9	25	"Winner Announced"	17 March 2013	Sunday 7:00 pm	1,022,000	#9	

=== Notes ===
^N/A = not in top 20

== International syndications ==
Country	Network	Broadcast
Singapore	MediaCorp Channel 5	Yes
India	Star World	Yes
New Zealand	TV One	Yes
Pakistan	Star World	Yes
The Netherlands	Net5	Yes
Ireland	Watch	Yes
United Kingdom	Watch	Yes
Malaysia	Lifetime (TV network)	Yes
Dominican Republic	TLC	Yes
Brazil	TLC	Yes
Belgium	Vier	Yes
Kuwait	Star World	Yes
Portugal	SIC Mulher	Yes
Sweden	TLC	Yes

== Accolades ==
Summary of Awards and Nominations
Year	Award	Category	Nominated	Result
2014	AACTA Awards	Best Reality Television Series		Won
2014	AACTA Awards	Best Direction in a Television Light Entertainment or Reality Series	Michael Venables for Episode 13: "Mansfield Offsite"	Nominated

Preceded by MasterChef Australia All-Stars	MasterChef Australia: The Professionals; 20 January 2013 – 17 March 2013	Succeeded by MasterChef Australia (series 5)
