= Rhys Badcock =

Australian chef

- Born: 1983 (age 42–43); Sunshine Coast, Queensland
- Culinary career
- Television show: MasterChef Australia: The Professionals
- Award won: Winner of MasterChef Australia: The Professionals (2013)

Rhys Badcock (born c.1983) is an Australian chef. He was the winner of MasterChef Australia: The Professionals in 2013. He splits his time between Byron Bay, New South Wales and Broome, Western Australia.

== Career ==
Badcock began his apprenticeship at Driftwood Estate in Margaret River. He completed his apprenticeship at Cape Lodge in Yallingup, Western Australia where he subsequently returned as the sous chef. Badcock also worked on Dunk Island and at Bespoke in Brisbane. Currently he is the resident chef on the cruise vessel 'True North”.

== MasterChef Australia: The Professionals ==
Badcock was approached by the production team to join MasterChef Australia: The Professionals where 18 chefs competed over two months. He went on to win the title, a $200,000 prize and a world trip.
