= Ganache =

Coating or filling made from chocolate and cream

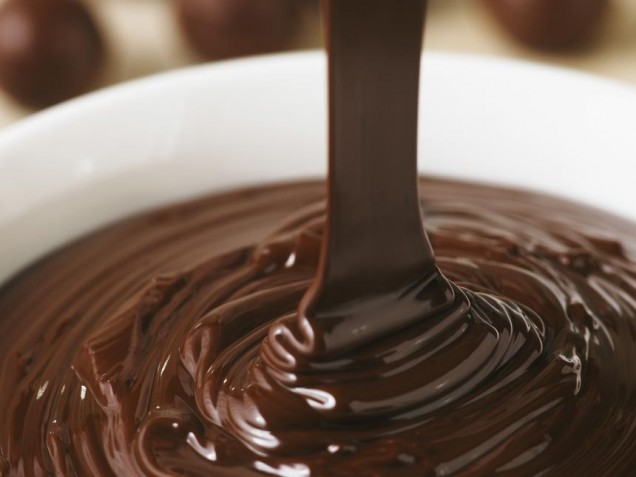
- Chocolate ganache being poured into a bowl
- Type: Chocolate
- Place of origin: France
- Main ingredients: Dark semi-sweet chocolate, cream

Ganache (UK: /ɡəˈnæʃ/, US: /ɡəˈnɑːʃ/; French: [ɡanaʃ]) is a glaze, icing, sauce, or filling for pastries and other sugar confectionery that is made from chocolate and cream.

In the broad sense of the term, ganache is an emulsion between (melted) solid chocolate (which is made with cocoa butter, the fat phase) and a water-based ingredient, which can be cream, milk or fruit pulp. It has a smooth and shiny appearance. Depending on the ratio of cocoa butter and water in the finished product, ganache can be either semi-solid or liquid at room temperature, which allows its usage in a wide diversity of desserts and confectionery items.

== Preparation ==
Ganache is a chocolate preparation containing heavy cream, or some other liquid.

- Cream-based ganache: a common approach.
- Butter ganache: More common in Europe, this is made with warm, tempered chocolate and softened butter.
- Fruit ganache: Uses fruit purée as the liquid, often with equal parts butter. It was traditionally stabilized with egg yolks, though invert sugar and apple pectin may be used.

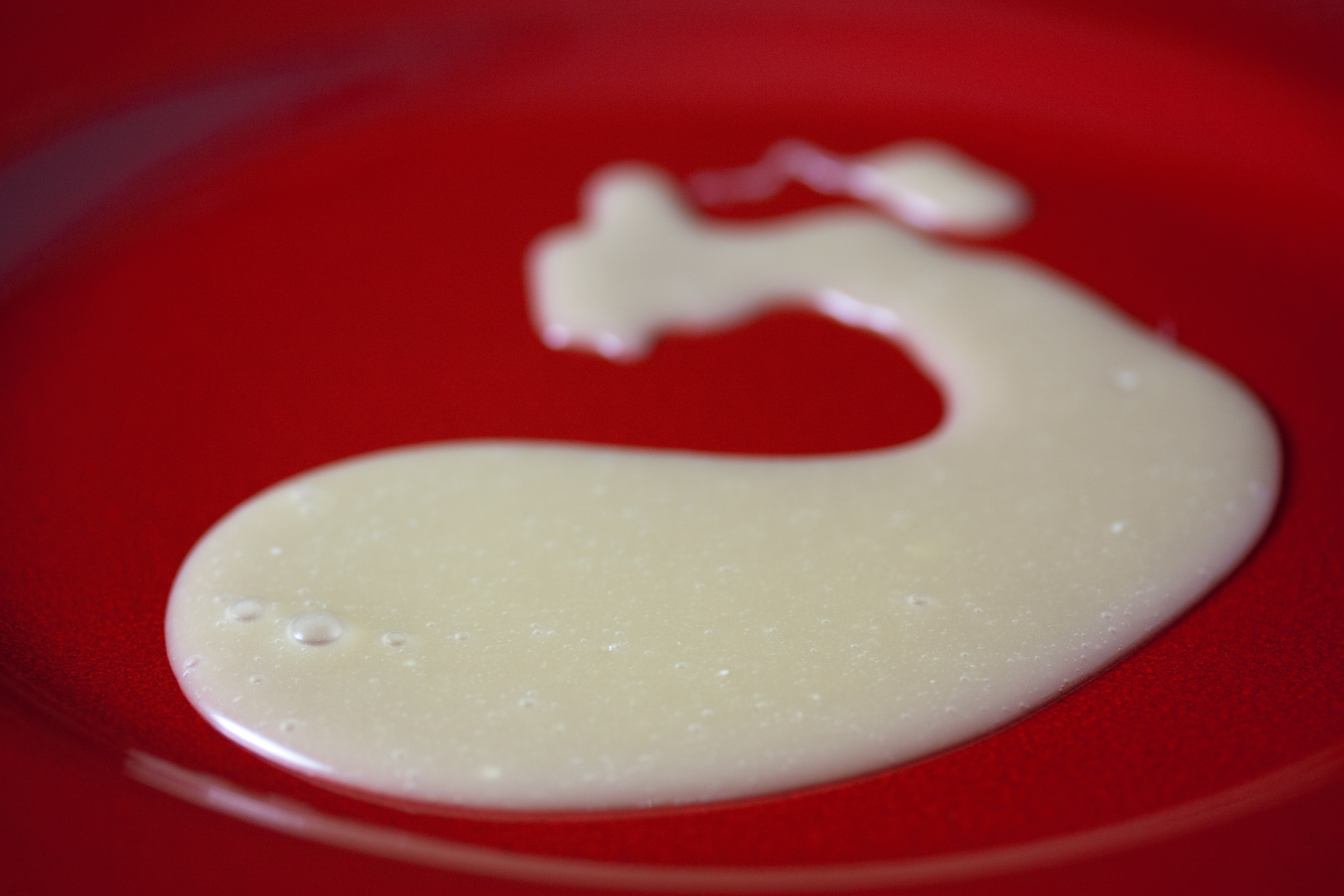
A thin white chocolate ganache. The ratio depends on how the ganache will be used.

The ratio between these ingredients varies, depending on the ingredients used and the preferred final consistency. A 1:1 ratio (i.e., equal weights of dark chocolate and cream) will produce a relatively hard ganache appropriate for icing or filling foods. More chocolate makes a "heavy" ganache, appropriate for making truffles; more liquid makes a thinner, "pourable" ganache that is more easily whipped. A heavy ganache can require twice as much dark chocolate as cream by weight, or 2.5 times as much milk chocolate or white chocolate. Similar ratios apply when making butter-based ganache, which uses unsalted butter instead of cream.

In preparing a ganache, cream and sometimes butter are heated. If the ganache is being infused with flavorings such as herbs or a tea, they are added to the hot (not boiling) cream and left to steep for several minutes. The hot cream is added to chocolate, left to stand for a few minutes so the heat from the cream can melt the chocolate, and then stirred to combine.

Finally, liqueurs or flavored pastes are sometimes added at the end. If liqueurs are added, then the amount of chocolate in the ganache must be increased proportionally to compensate for the added liquid (e.g., 100 grams of chocolate for 100 grams of liqueur, if a 1:1 ratio is being used). Other flavorings, such as nuts, may also be added at the end.

Different uses of ganache

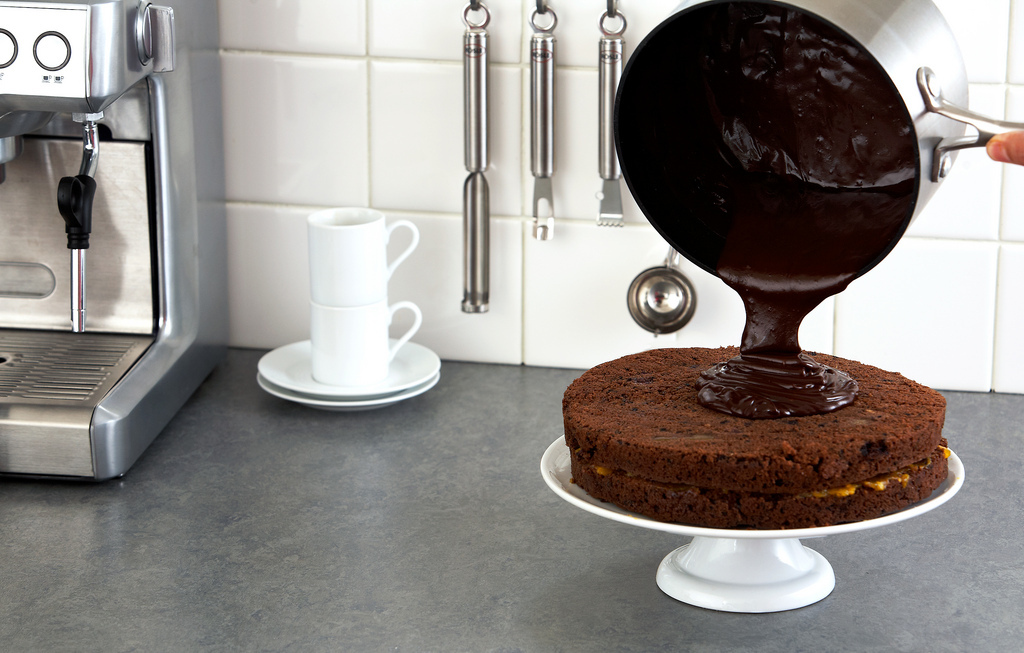
Ganache being poured atop a cake

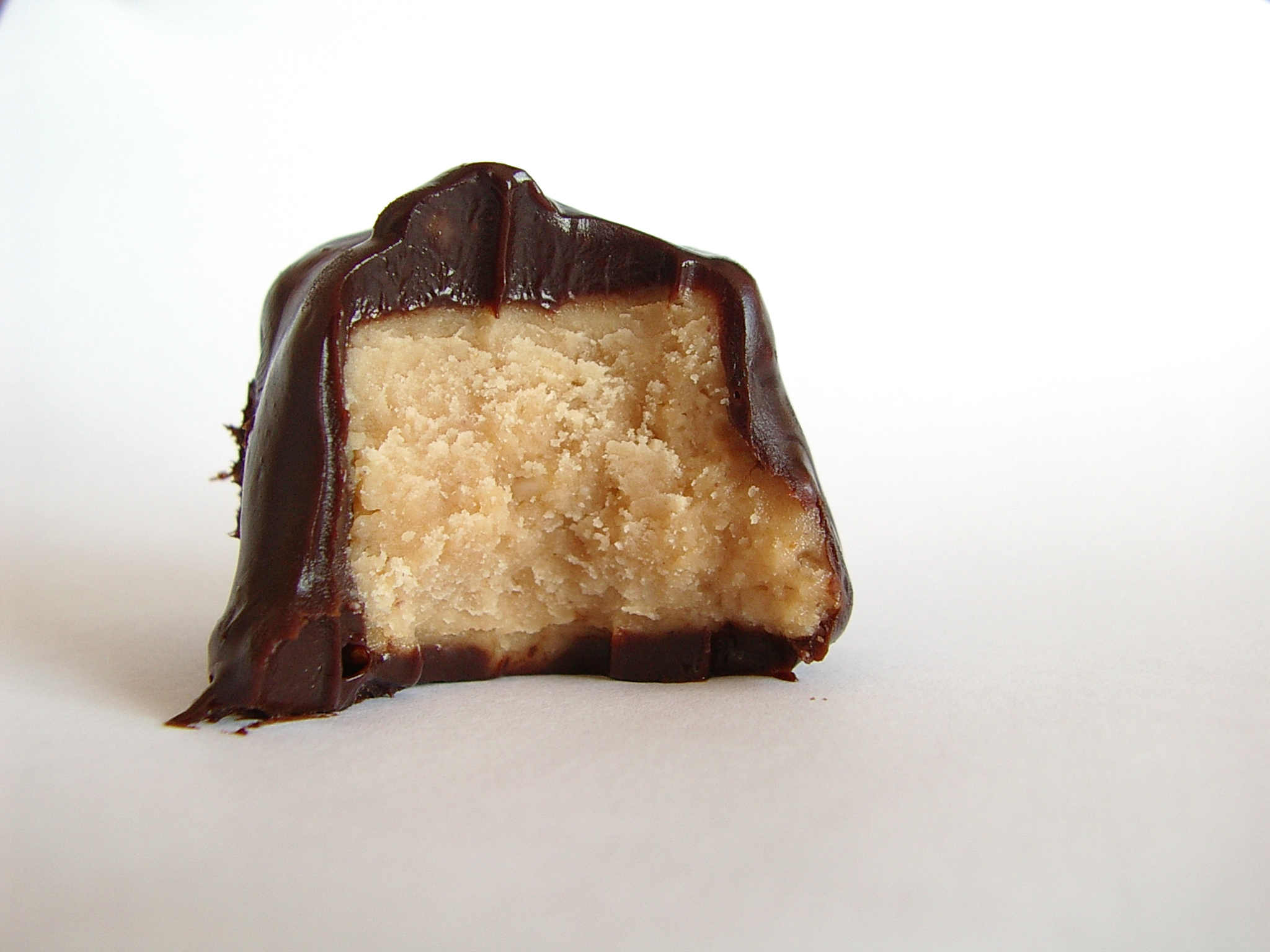
Peanut butter fudge covered in ganache

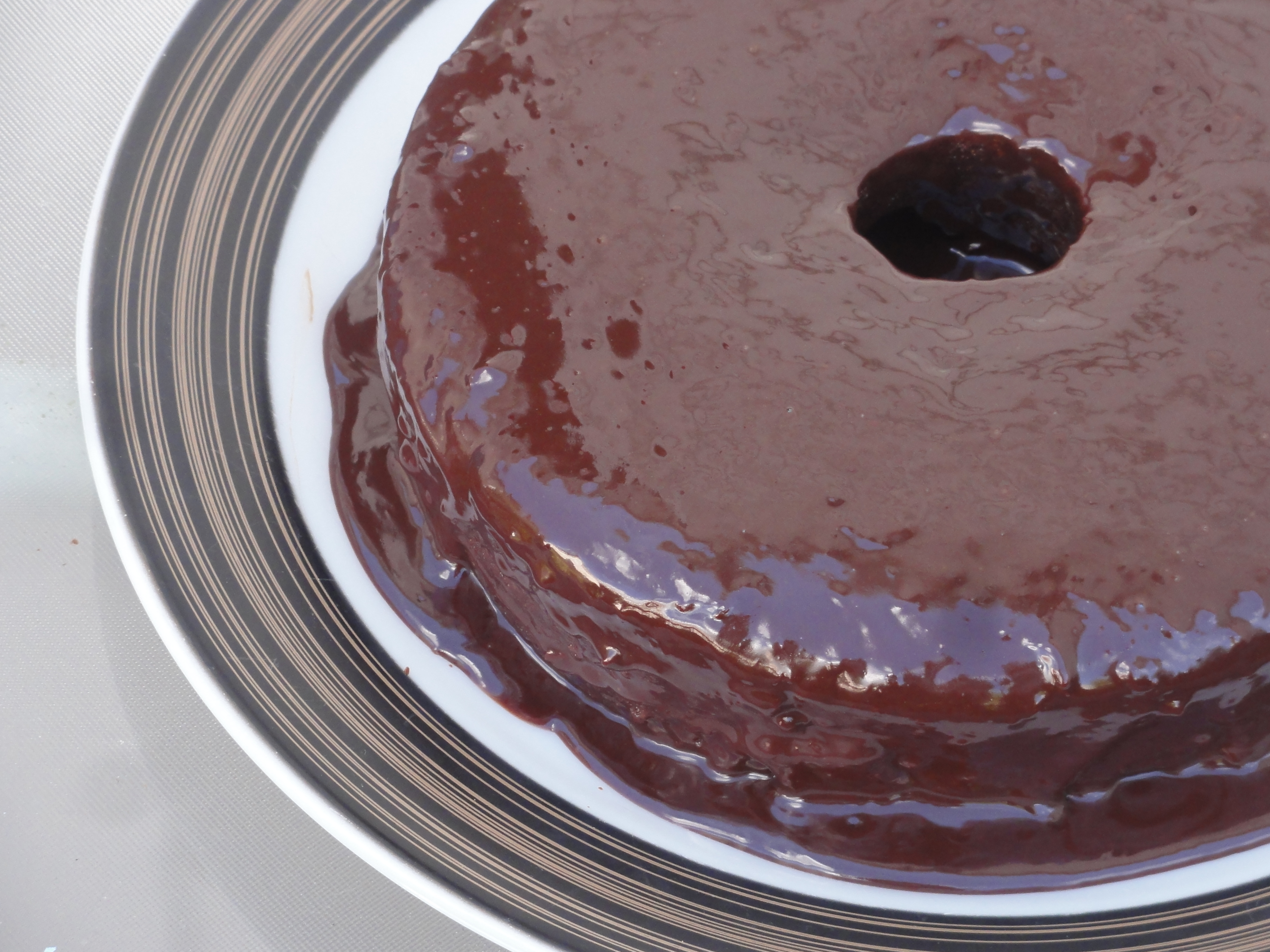
A chocolate cake with ganache frosting

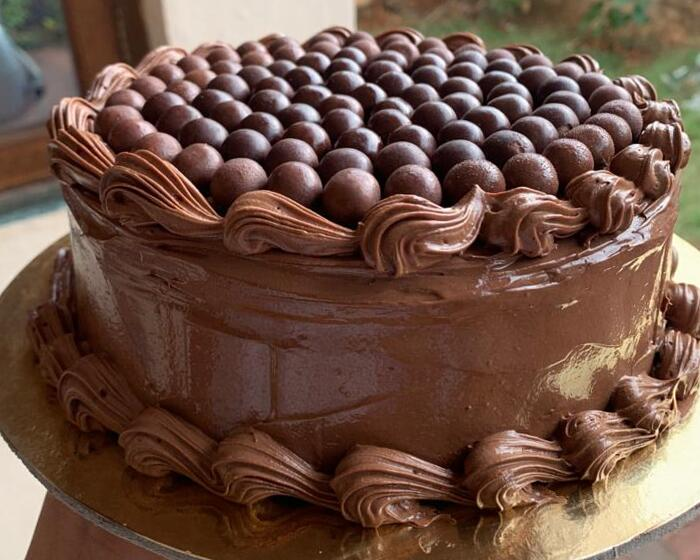
Whipped chocolate ganache on the side of the cake

A video of making ganache

== History ==
Ganache was said to have been created accidentally in the 1850s in Paris at a confectionery shop owned by Paul Siraudin, after an apprentice spilled cream on chocolate, prompting his master to call him "ganache" (meaning "idiot"). Ganache or crème ganache was originally sold as a kind of chocolate truffle. Siraudin named the sweet after a popular Vaudeville comedy debuted in that year by his contemporary Victorien Sardou called Les Ganaches ("The Chumps").

Chocolate desserts similar to ganache have probably been made since the introduction of cocoa to Europe. In his 1693 cookbook Le Cuisinier royal et bourgeois, François Massialot describes a 'crême de chocolat' consisting of milk, egg yolk, cream and chocolate.

== See also ==
- Enrobing, a chocolate coating process
- Namelaka, a similar chocolate cream made with milk and gelatine instead of butter and sugar
- Chocolate tempering
- Types of chocolate
- List of chocolate-covered foods
