= Amaury Guichon =

Swiss-French pastry chef (born 1991)

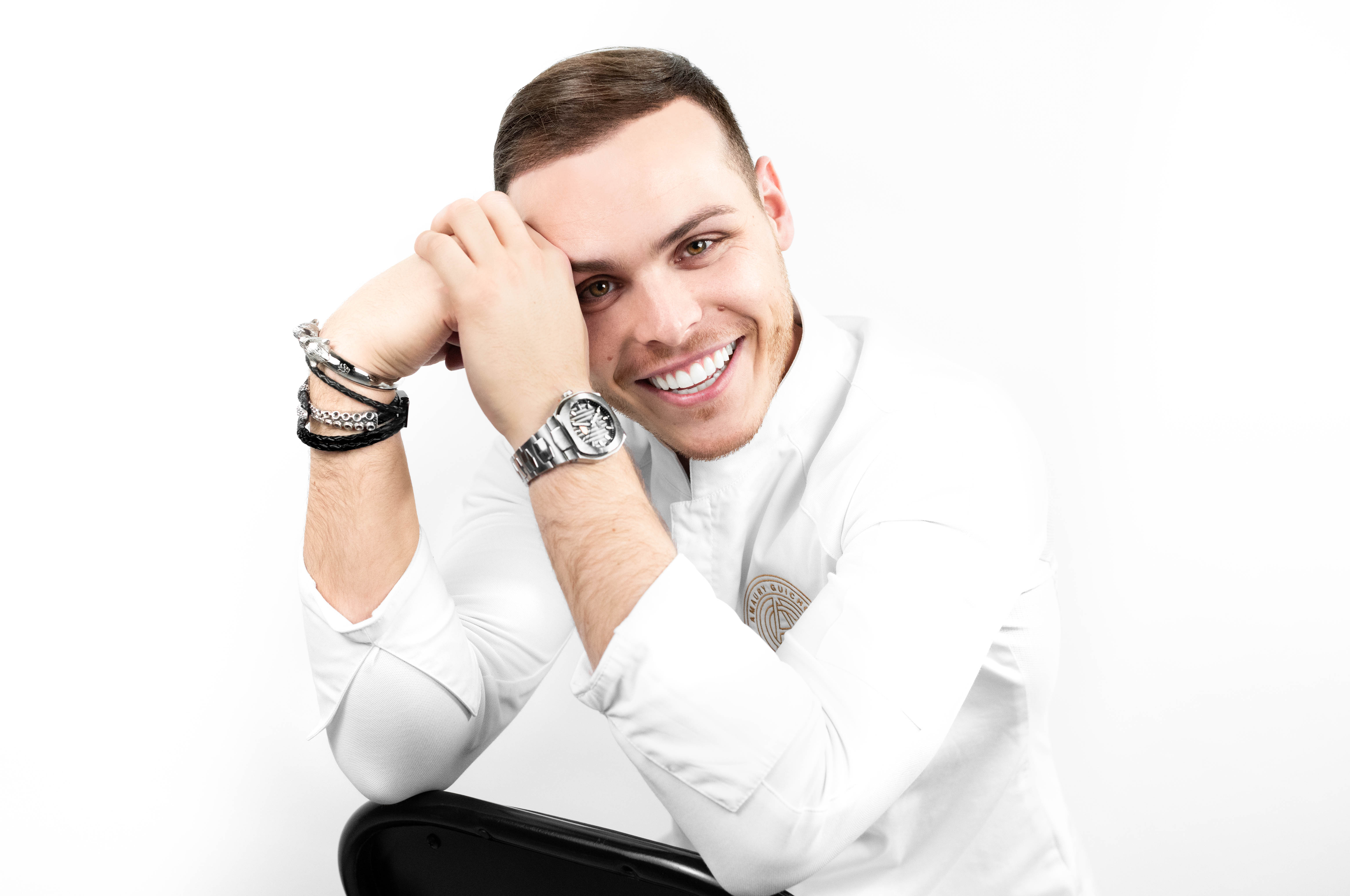
- Guichon in 2018
- Born: 15 March 1991 (age 35); Cannes, France
- Citizenship: France, Switzerland, United States
- Occupation: Chef
- Culinary career
- Cooking style: Pastry
- Television shows
- Qui sera le prochain grand pâtissier?; School of Chocolate; Dessert Masters
- Website: amauryguichon.com

Amaury Guichon (born 15 March 1991) is a French-Swiss pastry chef and chocolatier. He is known for his pastry designs and chocolate sculptures.

== Early life ==
Guichon was born to a Swiss mother and a French father, and grew up on the Haute-Savoie–Romandy border near Geneva, Switzerland. He has one older brother and one younger brother. In 2005 at the age of 14, he began his culinary training at the École Hôtelière Savoie Leman in Thonon-les-Bains, France and participating in local competitions. He perfected his pastry-making skills working at the Wolfisberg bakery in Geneva.

He took up an apprenticeship at the Maison Lenôtre in Paris. In 2010, he was awarded the title of Best Apprentice in France, by the council of the MOF association.

== Career ==
After completing his training, Guichon was hired to run the Lenôtre boutique and school in Cannes on the French Riviera. He later returned to Paris to work as an executive pastry chef at the Hugo & Victor patisserie and chocolate shop; he reached the level of executive chef by the age of 21.

In 2013, Guichon was a contestant on the France 2 reality cooking series Who will be the next great pastry chef? (French: Qui sera le prochain grand pâtissier?). He was third in the competition.

He has traveled all around the world teaching master classes. In 2019, Guichon co-founded the Pastry Academy with Belgian chef Michel Ernots in Las Vegas.

In 2016, Guichon began posting his desserts and chocolate creations on social media. He has over 23.9 million subscribers on YouTube, 18.5 million followers on Instagram and 28 million followers on TikTok.

Guichon's debut dessert cooking book The Art of Flavor was published on 13 December 2018.

Guichon hosted the 2021 eight-episode reality series School of Chocolate on Netflix, a competition where contestants construct chocolate sculptures. Guichon guides the contestants and judges the final result. That same year Guichon became a US citizen. He celebrated by creating a chocolate Statue of Liberty for the Fourth of July.

In 2022, Guichon's TikTok video of him constructing a giraffe out of chocolate became the most viewed TikTok video of the same year.

In 2023, Guichon began serving as a judge on the Australian reality series Dessert Masters, a spin-off of MasterChef Australia.

In 2024, Rihanna commissioned him to create a LEGO sculpture of ASAP Rocky.

== Personal life ==
Guichon is in a long-term relationship with life partner Ashley Rossi, an entrepreneur, fitness influencer, and fashion designer. The couple resides in Las Vegas in the United States and work together on many businesses.

== Filmography ==
Year	Title	Role	Notes
2013	Qui sera le prochain grand pâtissier?	Himself – Contestant	
2021	School of Chocolate	Himself – Host, Mentor & Judge	There are no eliminations in the series
2023	MasterChef Australia	Himself – Guest Judge	
2023–present	Dessert Masters	Himself – Host & Judge	
2025	Super Mega Cakes	Himself – Judge	
2026	The Ultimate Baking Championship	Himself – Judge	

== Accolades ==
- Apprentice Chocolate Showpiece Contest – 1st (2007–2009)
- Medalla de Oro (best apprentice) (2010)
- Délices de la Méditerranée – 1st (2012)
- Qui Sera le Prochain Grand Pâtissier? – 3rd (2013)

== Bibliography ==
- Guichon, Amaury (2018). Art of Flavor. Les Éditions Umami. ISBN 9781472141477.
