= The Little Paris Kitchen: Cooking with Rachel Khoo =

- Genre: Cooking
- Directed by: Ed St Giles
- Presented by: Rachel Khoo
- Theme music composer: Samuel Sim
- Country of origin: United Kingdom
- Original language: English
- No. of seasons: 1
- No. of episodes: 6

Production
- Production company: Plum Pictures

Original release
- Network: BBC Two
- Release: 19 March – 23 April 2012

Related
- Rachel Khoo’s Kitchen Notebook: Cosmopolitan Cook; Rachel Khoo’s Kitchen Notebook: London

The Little Paris Kitchen: Cooking with Rachel Khoo is a television cookery programme starring food writer and cook Rachel Khoo which first broadcast on BBC Two in the UK in March–April 2012. The show follows Khoo from her tiny kitchen in Paris, France, as she introduces the audience to "French food cooked simply, like Parisians do at home".

== Description ==
Rachel Khoo, alumnus of Le Cordon Bleu, welcomes the audience to the two-person smallest restaurant in Paris, cooks a number of classic French dishes in her tiny flat in Belleville, Paris, and introduces the viewer to "French food the way Parisians cook and eat it".

== Reception ==
John Crace of The Guardian described the first episode of The Little Paris Kitchen as "an uneasy mishmash: the format was, too; like so many other cooking programmes, it tried to cram in a bit of forced travelogue to add local colour, with hints of cultural appropriation". In another review of the first episode, Christopher Hooten wrote: "Khoo’s girl-in-the-big-city charm and hearty recipes make this series difficult to dislike", and remarked the show spliced recipes with images of Paris.

== Episodes ==
No.	Title	Original release date	Viewers (millions)
1	"Episode 1"	19 March 2012	1.69
Rachel introduces us to her eponymous kitchen and her apartment's two-cover restaurant by making her version of the French classic croque madame. She visits the Moroccan part of Paris's oldest food market in search of mint and explores the rooftop of the Grand Palais to source local honey created by Parisian bees for her madeleines. Featured recipes: Croque madame muffins; Navarin d'agneau printanier - spring lamb stew; Coq au vin barbecue sticks; Madeleines à la crème au citron - madeleines with lemon curd
2	"Episode 2"	26 March 2012	1.32
Rachel meets Christophe Vasseur, a master Parisian baker, and learns the secret of shaping baguettes. She puts a British twist on her oeufs en cocotte (eggs in pots) by serving them in teacups and creates a chocolate pudding, filled with salted caramel. Featured recipes: Chouquettes - sugar topped choux pastries; Truite en papillote - trout in a parcel; Oeufs en Cocotte - eggs in pots; Boeuf bourguignon with baguette dumplings; Moelleux au chocolat - chocolate lava cake
3	"Episode 3"	2 April 2012	1.33
Rachel puts her twist on cassoulet, the classic dish from the south-west of France, by transforming it into a soup, and makes the ultimate chocolate mousse. She takes a trip to an award-winning Parisian cheese shop, one of 400 in Paris, and visits Rungis, the world's largest wholesale food market, to produce steak tartare for a group of demanding French butchers. Featured recipes: Nids de tartiflette - cheese and potato nests; Bouillon de cassoulet - cassoulet soup; Steak tartare with a Japanese twist; Salade de figues et foies de volailles - fig and chicken liver salad; Mousse aux éclats de chocolat - chocolate mousse with cocoa nibs
4	"Episode 4"	9 April 2012	1.16
Rachel cooks sticky chicken, coated with a delicate lavender and lemon glaze. She also displays her pâtisserie skills with a batch of zesty grapefruit and pepper meringue tartlets. In the style of a true Parisian, Rachel take a trip to the French seaside town of Trouville, where a local fisherman treats her to succulent scallops in a creamy mustard mayonnaise. Featured recipes: Salade d'hiver - winter salad; Poulet à la lavande - lavender chicken; Cake au fromage et pruneaux - cake with cheese and prunes; Moules marinières with cider; Tartelettes au pamplemousse meringuées - grapefruit meringue tartlets
5	"Episode 5"	16 April 2012	1.43
Rachel visits one of Paris's finest street markets and encounters Joel Thiebault, the French 'king of vegetables'. Joel sells to the world's top chefs and today Rachel is looking for succulent beetroot for her superb Puy lentil, beetroot and goat's cheese salad. Rachel serves the lightest of desserts - îles flottantes - where delicately poached meringues drift on the creamiest vanilla custard. She samples exquisite Normandy oysters at a stall offering five succulent varieties, then prepares gourmet garnishes with a Parisian chef. Featured recipes: Salade de lentilles du Puy - Puy lentil salad; Bouillon de poulet - chicken dumpling soup; Les huîtres - oysters; Îles flottantes - floating islands; Sole meunière - pan fried sole
6	"Episode 6"	23 April 2012	1.27
Rachel serves a classic quiche lorraine with a rich creamy filling and melt-in-the-mouth pastry. She visits a Vietnamese restaurant to explore the latest Asian food trends that are finding fans in Paris then fulfils an all-time desire by turning her hand to crêpe making with a Parisian street vendor, to produce the city's most famous and favourite snack. And finally, she serves up her twist on beef wellington - tender venison surrounded by caramelized onions and Dijon mustard inside parcels of golden flaky pastry. Featured recipes: Quiche Lorraine; Pistou soup; Salades de carottes râpées et céleri-rave - carrot and celeriac salads; Crème de marrons - sweet chestnut cream; Mini chevreuil en croûte - mini venison Wellington
