= School of Chocolate =

2021 reality competition series

- Genre: Reality
- Presented by: Amaury Guichon
- Country of origin: United States
- Original language: English
- No. of seasons: 1
- No. of episodes: 8

Production
- Executive producers: Adam Cohen; Cara Tapper; Joanna Vernetti; Jeanne Begley; Andrea Richter
- Running time: 30–50 minutes
- Production company: Super Delicious Productions

Original release
- Network: Netflix
- Release: November 26, 2021

School of Chocolate is a Netflix reality competition series hosted by Swiss-French pastry chef, artist and chocolatier Amaury Guichon and produced by Super Delicious Productions. Eight contestants compete against each other in a series of innovative cooking challenges, creating elaborate chocolate sculptures as they aim for the title of 'best in the class' and a prize of $50,000.00. Guichon acts as both a mentor and a judge to the contestants. The series premiered on Netflix on November 26, 2021.

== Contestants ==
The cast comprises eight pastry and chocolate professionals.

- Amanda Miller
- Cedrick Simpson
- Daniel Joseph Corpuz
- Juan Gutierrez
- Mellisa Root
- Stephanie Norcio
- Thiago Silva
- Tyricia Clark

== Episodes ==
| No. | Title | Original release date |
|---|---|---|
| 1 | "Breaking Molds and Bending Chocolate" | November 26, 2021 |
For the first challenge chefs were given four and a half hours to create edible illusions out of chocolate using hand crafted moulds. Those who did not fare well in the first challenge attend a one-on-one session with Amaury Guichon, instead of competing in the second challenge. In the second challenge contestants split off into two teams. The two winners of the last challenge, Daniel Joseph Corpuz and Juan Gutierrez, are assigned as team captains, and select their team members, excluding Tyricia Clark and Amanda Miller who attend the one-on-one session. For this challenge the two teams had 14 hours to bend chocolate into intricate architectural shapes and structures. Juan was crowned best in the class for episode one.
| 2 | "Dessert Deception" | November 26, 2021 |
The first challenge requires chefs to create a photo realistic food item using various natural additives. Again the two chefs who did not live up to Guichon's standards attend a one-on-one session with the expert. This episode Daniel Joseph Corpuz and Cedrick Simpson were excluded from the second challenge to attend the session with Guichon. For the second challenge chefs again split into two teams to craft a nature inspired chocolate structure. Chefs Amanda Miller and Stephanie Norcio were team leaders. The end of episode left viewers on a cliff hanger, as team Stephanie's chocolate sculpture collapsed.
| 3 | "Make It Ooze" | November 26, 2021 |
Episode three began as Chef Guichon provided feedback to the two teams naming Team Amanda as the winners of the second challenge. Chef Guichon was conflicted when naming best in the class between Daniel Joseph Corpuz and Mellisa Root, so he leaves it up the contestants to vote amongst themselves for best in class. Mellisa Root was voted in as best in class. Challenge one of episode three must include an ‘Oozing’ element. Contestants were given four and a half hours to create their story telling dessert with the oozing element. Team leaders were named Tyrisha Clark and Juan Gutierrez. Those on the bottom and attending the one-on-one session with Guichon in episode four were Mellisa Root and Thiago Silva.
| 4 | "Chocolate Hanging by a Thread" | November 26, 2021 |
Contestant have 16 hours to design a chocolate showpiece that hangs from the ceiling. This time the chefs split into teams of two. This week Juan and Daniel's team won the Chocolate Showpiece Challenge. Juan Gutierrez was named best in class for the second time.
| 5 | "Bittersweet Surprises" | November 26, 2021 |
Half of the contestants were challenged to create flower petals out of tempered chocolate; the other half were tasked with creating a hinge mechanism out of chocolate. The petal contestants had four and a half hours to create a cake displaying the flower element of this week's exercise. The hinge team with the same amount of time were instructed to create an interactive pastry that included a hinge. Out of the flower contestants Cedrick Simpson was the winner. Mellisa was named winner of the hinge contestants. The winners of the pastry exercises were "prized" with the decision to decide who will not compete in the showpiece challenge. Juan Gutierrez and Stephanie Norcio were chosen to sit out of the Showpiece challenge.
| 6 | "Flying Chocolate" | November 26, 2021 |
Episode six starts with a Chocolate Showpiece Challenge. This week's showpiece challenge contestants were instructed to create a small showpiece suitable for a children's birthday party, encapsulating the theme of flight. Paired off into teams of two contestants had nine hours to create their chocolate structure. The winning team of today's challenge was Tyricia Clark and Mellisa Root, Tyricia was also named as best in class.
| 7 | "Give Me Some Sugar" | November 26, 2021 |
For the pastry exercise chefs were challenged with four and a half hours to create anything they wanted as long as it included a blown sugar element. This week Thiago and Juan were named best in the class. Chef Guichon named the two top achievers in the ‘class’: Juan Gutierrez and Mellisa Root. Guichon announced that the next chocolate exercise will determine who the winner is out of Juan and Mellisa. They will lead two teams of four to create a chocolate showpiece.
| 8 | "The Best in Class Is..." | November 26, 2021 |
The theme for the final Chocolate showpiece challenge was prehistoric. Juan chose Daniel, Tyricia and Cedrick. Mellisa chose Thiago, Amanda and Stephanie. Teams had 16 hours to make a four-foot-tall chocolate showpiece entirely out of chocolate. The awards for the winner was an official invitation to Chef Amaury Guichon's pastry academy in Las Vegas, to teach at an international masterclass. The second award was a check for $50,000. The third prize; an invitation to the Charleston Wine and Food Festival. The final prize; a one-on-one session with professional chefs from Cacao Barry . The awards total to a value of $100,000. Best in class was named Juan Gutierrez.

== Production ==
The series was announced in August 2021 as part of Netflix's culinary slate with Amaury Guichon set to host the competition. Adam Cohen, Cara Tapper, Joanna Vernetti, Jeanne Begley, and Andrea Richter are executive producers of the series. A trailer for the series was first released on November 15, 2021.

== Reception ==
Mashable gave the first season a positive review, remarking on the advance away from the cut-throat traditional format of similar competitive reality shows. In School of Chocolate there are no elimination of participants.
