= Namelaka =

Chocolate pastry cream

Namelaka is a chocolate flavored cream for pastries and cakes, similar to ganache, but with a lighter and stiffer texture. It is made from chocolate, cream, milk, and gelatin, unlike ganache which uses butter and sugar in place of milk and gelatin. It was invented at the Valrhona chocolate cooking school, and named after a Japanese word meaning "creamy".

Valrhona's recipe combines roughly one part each of milk and dark chocolate to two parts of whipping cream. The recipe adds rehydrated gelatin to boiling milk, pours the mixture over melted chocolate, and mixes them into an emulsion. Then, the result is mixed again with the cream and refrigerated. Variations of the recipe use other kinds of chocolate or include additional flavorings.
