= Rachel Khoo =

British cook, writer and broadcaster

- Born: 28 August 1980 (age 46); Croydon, South London, England
- Education: Central Saint Martin's College of Art and Design
- Occupations: Cook; Writer; Broadcaster
- Years active: 2010–present
- Television: The Little Paris Kitchen: Cooking with Rachel Khoo; Rachel Khoo's Kitchen Notebook: London; Rachel Khoo's Kitchen Notebook: Cosmopolitan Cook; Rachel Khoo's Kitchen Notebook: Melbourne; Rachel Khoo My Swedish Kitchen; Zumbo’s Just Desserts; Rachel Khoo's Simple Pleasures; Great British Menu; Great Australian Bake Off
- Spouse: Robert Wiktorin
- Children: 3
- Website: www.rachelkhoo.com

Rachel Khoo (born 28 August 1980) is a British cook, author, and broadcaster who has hosted and co-hosted television cooking shows on the BBC, Food Network, and Netflix. In 2012, she received international acclaim for her cookbook and its accompanying BBC cookery series, The Little Paris Kitchen: Cooking with Rachel Khoo.

== Early life ==
Khoo was born in Croydon, South London. She has a younger brother named Michael and attended primary school in Bromley. Her paternal family were Chinese immigrants to Malaysia and were part of the Khoo Kongsi clanhouse in George Town, Penang. Her father is Malaysian Chinese and immigrated to the UK from Ipoh, Perak, at age 16 in 1968. He later met and married her mother, an Austrian native. When Khoo was 12, her father's job in IT took the family to Bavaria, where they lived in the countryside outside Munich for four years. They returned to the UK when she was 16 and settled outside of London. She attended Central Saint Martins College of Art and Design in London, and earned a degree in art and design.

== Career ==
=== Early career ===
After graduating from university, Khoo worked in public relations for the shirt-maker Thomas Pink for two years. Looking for "adventure" in her life and with no knowledge of French, she quit her job and took a three-month patisserie course at Le Cordon Bleu in Paris in 2006. While living in Paris, she worked part-time as an au pair and sold perfume at Printemps, an upscale department store. After graduating from Le Cordon Bleu, she worked at La Cocotte, a Parisian cookbook store and café, where she ran baking workshops and served as the store's pastry chef.

In 2010, Khoo received her first publishing deal for two French-language cookery books: Barres à céreales, muesli et granola maison and Pâtes à tartiner, published by Marabout. Both were later translated into English, as Rachel Khoo's Muesli and Granola and Rachel Khoo's Sweet and Savory Pâtés. During this time, she also worked briefly in Germany as a freelancer for Volkswagen, where she ran food-related events.

After successfully pitching UK publishers her concept for a new cookbook, Khoo opened a small restaurant to test recipes for her first English-language cookbook, The Little Paris Kitchen. She prepared and served food from her Paris flat in the Belleville neighbourhood, accommodating just two diners at a time. Using social media to advertise the restaurant, she quickly attracted a large fan base. Later, the BBC commissioned The Little Paris Kitchen: Cooking with Rachel Khoo, her first TV series. Her restaurant closed before production began on the series. The six-episode series was filmed in Khoo's Paris kitchen and around the city. It began airing on British TV on 19 March 2012. Eventually, the series was aired in international markets. The book The Little Paris Kitchen was released in 2012. It has been translated into several languages. The book became a bestseller, selling more than 120,000 copies. Each edition of the television series was watched by over 1.5 million viewers in the UK.

=== 2013 to 2016 ===
Khoo released her second English-language cookbook, My Little French Kitchen, chronicling her travels across France, in September 2013, published by Michael Joseph. My Little French Kitchen sold upwards of 1,000 copies a week. In 2014, she completed filming two new cooking series for BBC Worldwide: Rachel Khoo’s Kitchen Notebook: London and Rachel Khoo's Kitchen Notebook: Cosmopolitan Cook. Both series aired in the UK and internationally. In Rachel Khoo's Kitchen Notebook: Cosmopolitan Cook, she visited various European and Eurasian cities, including Stockholm and Istanbul, and cooked dishes inspired by her travels. Her cookbook, Rachel Khoo’s Kitchen Notebook, was released in the UK on 12 February 2015. In November 2014, she travelled to Malaysia to film an episode of the series A Cook Abroad.

On 9 March 2015, BBC television aired A Cook Abroad: Rachel Khoo's Malaysia, where she visited the home of her father's extended family and explored the cuisine of the country. Khoo's fourth television series, Rachel Khoo's Kitchen Notebook: Melbourne, premiered in Australia on 23 July 2015 on the network SBS. In February 2016, she was announced as a new judge on the Australian TV cooking competition My Kitchen Rules, for the series' 7th season. Khoo filmed the programme in 2015 while travelling throughout Australia. The new season began airing on Seven Network beginning on 1 February 2016. Khoo appears in 6 episodes of the program.

Khoo launched Khoollect, a lifestyle-, fashion- and food-oriented online blog in February 2016. The blog is defunct as of 2020.

In April 2016, Khoo filmed Zumbo's Just Desserts in Sydney, alongside pastry chef Adriano Zumbo. The television series was commissioned by the Seven Network, and Khoo served as one of the judges. The programme premiered in Australia on 22 August 2016 and streamed on Netflix in the U.S. in 2018.

=== 2018 to 2023 ===
Her sixth cookbook, The Little Swedish Kitchen, was released on 26 July 2018. In 2018, Khoo began filming her new television series, My Swedish Kitchen, in the Swedish countryside. The programme features recipes from the cookbook'. The show premiered for Food Network UK on 22 August 2019. It is expected to air in Germany, Australia and New Zealand, and on BBC Asia. In 2020, she appeared in season two of the British TV series, Remarkable Places to Eat. Her episode focused on highlighting the food culture of Vienna, Austria.

On 7 February 2021, it was announced that Khoo would be joining as a new judge on Great British Menu when the series returned in spring 2021. In August 2022, Khoo was named as a new judge for the seventh season of the television baking series The Great Australian Bake Off. The season premiered in Australia in June 2023.

=== 2024 to present ===
Khoo appeared in season eight of The Great Australian Bake Off as a judge. She spent several weeks in Sydney filming the series in the summer of 2024. The series premiered in Australia in September 2024. Through a partnership with the British potato chip brand, Kettle, Khoo became the first female chef to collaborate on a mentorship programme for aspiring female chefs. The programme's goal is to highlight the achievements of women chefs in the British food industry, where women comprise under 20% of kitchen chefs nationally.

== Personal life ==
In 2006, Khoo moved to Paris, where she lived for eight years. In 2014, she returned to London, settling in Hoxton, a district of Hackney and then moved to Stockholm in 2016. She later sold her flat in Hoxton. She previously owned a flat in Kensal Green in north-west London, which served as the headquarters of her now-defunct lifestyle blog/studio Khoollect. She speaks English, French, German and some Swedish.

In 2014 she became engaged to Swedish businessman Robert Wiktorin, and they got married in 2015. She gave birth to her first child, a boy, in 2016. Her second child, also a boy, was born in early 2019. Her third child was born in 2022. She cites Paris as her favourite city for cuisine. Her maternal great-grandparents were farmers from Bregenzerwald, Austria. Khoo's extended maternal family is from the rural region of Feldkirch, Austria, near the border with Switzerland and she spent summers visiting Austrian relatives during her childhood.

In 2024 she and her family moved to a seaside village near Malmö. When she first lived in Stockholm in 2016, she resided in Hornstull, a neighbourhood in western Stockholm. In 2024 she launched her newsletter, Les Petits Pleasures, where she shares recipes and travel tips for paid subscribers.

== Filmography ==
Year	Television series	Notes
2012	The Little Paris Kitchen: Cooking with Rachel Khoo	6 episodes (Television debut)
2014	Rachel Khoo's Kitchen Notebook: London	10 episodes
2014	Rachel Khoo's Kitchen Notebook: Cosmopolitan Cook	10 episodes
2014	Tom Kerridge's Spring Kitchen	Series 1, Episode 8
2015	A Cook Abroad: Rachel Khoo's Malaysia	1 episode
2015	Rachel Khoo's Kitchen Notebook: Melbourne	8 episodes
2016	My Kitchen Rules	Season 7 guest judge (Episodes 13-18)
2016	The TV That Made Me	Series 2, episode 18
2016	Zumbo's Just Desserts	Co-host (12 episodes)
2019	My Swedish Kitchen	8 episodes
2020	Zumbo's Just Desserts	Co-host (10 episodes)
2020	Rachel Khoo: A Chocolate Christmas	Host (1 episode)
2020	Rachel Khoo's Simple Pleasures	Host (8 episodes)
2020	Remarkable Places to Eat	Season 2, episode 2: Vienna (Guest co-host)
2020	Rachel Khoo: A Chocolate Christmas	Host (1 episode)
2021	Rachel Khoo's Chocolate	Host (12 episodes)
2021	Great British Menu	Judge; Series 16
2023–present	The Great Australian Bake Off	Judge, Seasons 7, 8 and 9

== Bibliography ==
- Barres de Céréales - Muesli et Granola maison. Marabout. 2010. ISBN 978-2501064194.
- Je fais mes Pâtes à Tartiner. Marabout. 2010. ISBN 978-2501067775.
- The Little Paris Kitchen. Michael Joseph. 2012. ISBN 978-0718158118.
- My Little French Kitchen. Michael Joseph. 2013. ISBN 978-0718177478.
- Rachel Khoo's Muesli and Granola. W&N. 2013. ISBN 978-0297868934.
- Rachel Khoo's Sweet and Savoury Pâtés. W&N. 2014. ISBN 978-0297868958.
- Rachel Khoo's Kitchen Notebook. Michael Joseph. 2015. ISBN 978-0718179465.
- The Little Swedish Kitchen. Michael Joseph. 2018. ISBN 978-0718188917.
