= Zumbo's Just Desserts =

- Genre: Baking; Cooking; Reality
- Presented by: Adriano Zumbo; Rachel Khoo
- Country of origin: Australia
- Original language: English
- No. of series: 2
- No. of episodes: 22

Production
- Running time: 60-75 mins (including commercials)
- Production company: Seven Studios

Original release
- Network: Seven Network
- Release: 22 August 2016 – 5 December 2019

Zumbo's Just Desserts is an Australian baking reality competition television program on the Seven Network. The program was developed by the creators of My Kitchen Rules, and is hosted by Adriano Zumbo and Rachel Khoo, with Gigi Falanga as assistant.

A second season was commissioned in August 2018 with Netflix joining as a co-producer. The second season premiered on 17 November 2019. In May 2019, it was announced that Falanga was not returning for season two.

== Background ==
In February 2016, the title of the program was revealed along with naming Zumbo as host. Khoo was named as co-host in April 2016. In June 2016, Falanga was announced as joining the program as assistant and timekeeper and promos were released, advising the show would air after the 2016 Summer Olympics.

Despite poor ratings for the first season, an international release through streaming service Netflix led to a second season being commissioned as a co-production between Netflix and Seven Studios.

== Contestants ==
=== Season 1 ===
	Age	Job	Outcome
Kate	32	No-nonsense Mum	Winner
Ali	28	Insurance broker	Runner-up
Brogen	22	Stay-At-Home Mum	3rd place
Daniel	25	Bouncer	4th place
Irene	34	Finance Analyst	5th place
Amie	24	Admin Assistant	6th place
Ashley	28	Airline Crewing Officer	7th place
Michael	51	Bricklayer	8th place
Vicki	44	Technical Writer	9th place
Patricia	33	Social Media Manager	10th place
Peter	57	Car salesman	11th place
Wendy	39	Art Lover	12th place

=== Season 2 ===
Name	Age	Job	Outcome
Catherine	19	Student	Winner
Simon	36	Concreter	Runner-Up
Jeff	50	Competitive Dad	3rd place
Kylie	45	Sugarcane Farmer	4th place
Rachel	32	Playgroup Leader	5th place
Kristie	35	Cake Pop Decorator	6th place
Zak	39	Account Manager	7th place
Megan	32	Perfectionist Mum	8th place
Pearly	30	Flight Attendant	9th place
Kimberley	46	Office Worker	10th place

== Broadcast ==
The series aired after the Seven Network's coverage of the 2016 Olympic Games on 22 August 2016. As of April 2018, the series is streaming on Netflix.

=== Ratings ===
Ratings data is from OzTAM and represents the average viewership from the 5 largest Australian metropolitan centres (Sydney, Melbourne, Brisbane, Perth and Adelaide).

==== Season 1 ====
Wk	No.	Airdate	Overnight ratings		Consolidated ratings		Total viewers	Ref(s)
Wk	No.	Airdate	Viewers	Rank	Viewers	Rank	Total viewers	Ref(s)
1	1	22 August 2016	1,081,000	3	153,000	3	1,235,000	
1	2	23 August 2016	830,000	8	105,000	8	935,000	
1	3	24 August 2016	734,000	12	104,000	13	838,000	
2	4	29 August 2016	769,000	13	91,000	10	860,000	
2	5	30 August 2016	880,000	5	82,000	5	963,000	
3	6	5 September 2016	657,000	18	71,000	15	728,000	
3	7	6 September 2016	794,000	10	65,000	8	859,000	
4	8	12 September 2016	681,000	14	57,000	15	738,000	
4	9	13 September 2016	646,000	13	60,000	12	706,000	
5	10	19 September 2016	647,000	14	59,000	14	706,000	
5	11	20 September 2016	688,000	11	64,000	12	751,000	
6	12	27 September 2016	762,000	9	83,000	8	845,000	

==== Season 2 ====
Wk	No.	Airdate	Overnight ratings		Consolidated ratings		Total viewers	Ref(s)
Wk	No.	Airdate	Viewers	Rank	Viewers	Rank	Total viewers	Ref(s)
1	1	17 November 2019	446,000	7	31,000	7	477,000	
1	2	18 November 2019	393,000	17	45,000	17	438,000	
1	3	19 November 2019	359,000	15	42,000	16	401,000	
1	4	20 November 2019	385,000	16	35,000	16	420,000	
2	5	24 November 2019	405,000	11	41,000	11	446,000	
2	6	25 November 2019	356,000	21	35,000	20	391,000	
2	7	26 November 2019	341,000	20	33,000	19	375,000	
3	8	4 December 2019	341,000	15	24,000	13	365,000	
3	9	5 December 2019	288,000	18	22,000	17	310,000	
3	10	5 December 2019	299,000	16	36,000	15	335,000	
