= Adriano Zumbo =

Australian pâtissier and television presenter

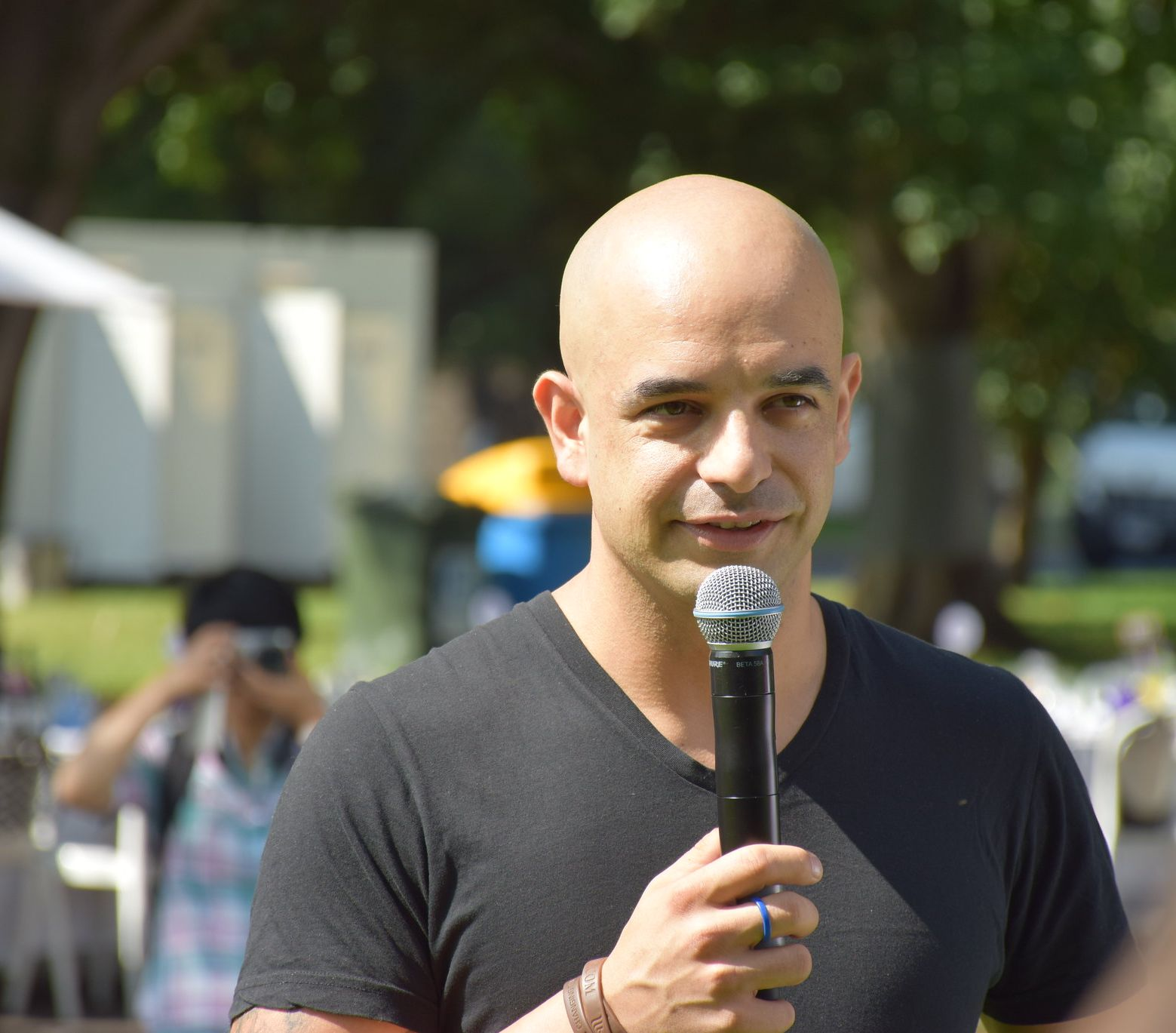
- Zumbo in 2017
- Born: 6 November 1981 (age 45); Coonamble, New South Wales, Australia
- Occupation: Pâtissier
- Spouse: Ornella Riggio (m. 2022)
- Children: 2

Adriano Zumbo (born 6 November 1981) is an Australian pâtissier and television presenter. He opened his first patisserie in 2007 before rising to prominence as a frequent guest on MasterChef Australia. Zumbo is the titular host of the Australian baking competition program Zumbo's Just Desserts and a judge on the Netflix web series Sugar Rush. As a popular figure he has garnered many nicknames in the media, including "Sweet Assassin", "Patissier of Pain", "the Dark Lord of the Pastry Kitchen" and "Lord Voldecake". He has also been called "Australia's answer to Willy Wonka".

== Early life and education ==
Adriano Zumbo was born to Italian parents Frank and Nancy Zumbo from Calabria in 1981 and was raised in Coonamble, New South Wales, 164 kilometres (102 mi) northwest of Dubbo. Zumbo's parents owned the local IGA supermarket, where he developed a sweet tooth and a keen business sense. His early years were spent in Italy where he learned to appreciate various types of coffee, reflected in the coffee-inspired culinary items found at the various patisseries he owned around Sydney.

After finishing school, Zumbo travelled to Sydney to start his pastry chef apprenticeship in 1997. He worked under renowned culinary icons in Australia and France including Ramon Morato and Pierre Hermé.

== Career ==
Zumbo started his career by supplying homemade tarts, muffins, brownies and banana bread to local cafés in Sydney. He later switched to selling goods to grower's market before opening his first patisserie in Balmain in 2007. As of 2017, Zumbo had ten patisseries in Sydney and Melbourne.

In August 2018, Zumbo's company was placed in voluntary administration, with plans for existing stores continuing to stay open.

=== Television appearances ===
Zumbo appeared on a six-part documentary television series Zumbo, featuring the daily routine of the chef at his Balmain kitchen business, which screened on SBS One in 2011.

Zumbo has appeared on every season of Masterchef, starting with setting a croquembouche challenge in season 1. His fifth appearance in 2010 challenged contestants to recreate his raspberry-beetroot and black olive macaron "tower of terror". Within three days of the episode airing, he had sold 5000 macarons at his Balmain shop, quadruple the normal rate. Zumbo's vanilla V8 cake was featured as a challenge dish in the 2010 season of Masterchef, and has layers of vanilla glaze, crème chantilly, water gel, macaron, brulee, chiffon, syrup, ganache, almond crunch and almond dacquoise. The cake had originally been created in honour of Margaret Fulton's 85th birthday, and was so named for its eight textures of vanilla. In June 2016, the same layered cake was listed as number 8 in Good Food's 2016 top 10 cult desserts in Sydney.

In August 2016, Zumbo co-hosted Seven Network cooking series Zumbo's Just Desserts with Rachel Khoo and Gigi Falanga.

In the 2018 Netflix series Sugar Rush, hosted by Hunter March, Zumbo is a judge alongside Candace Nelson.

Zumbo also appeared as a contestant on the first season of Dessert Masters in 2023.

=== Controversy over failure to pay workers ===
In 2017, A Current Affair featured accusations that Zumbo underpaid his staff. Zumbo later confirmed that the business was backpaying staff due to payroll errors.

=== Publications ===
In 2011, Zumbo released his first book, Zumbo: Adriano Zumbo's fantastical kitchen of other-worldly delights.

- Zumbo, Adriano (2011). Zumbo: Adriano Zumbo's fantastical kitchen of other-worldly delights. Murdoch Books (Sydney). ISBN 9781742668659
- Zumbo, Adriano (2012). Zumbarons: a fantasy land of macarons. Murdoch Books (Crows Nest). ISBN 9781743364017
- Zumbo, Adriano (2015). The Zumbo files: unlocking the secrets of a master patissier. Murdoch Books (Sydney). ISBN 9781925266504

== Zumbo ==
Zumbo is an Australian observational documentary television series following Zumbo at his Balmain, Sydney kitchen business.

The series premiered on 10 February 2011 and ran for 6 episodes. It screened on SBS One Thursdays at 7:30pm.

Zumbo's signature dish is the macaron, and the first episode featured the lead up to 'Macaron Day', as the kitchen pumps out close to 30,000 multicoloured macarons. Episode 2 focused on the preparation of his new 'Summer Collection,' a range of new creations presented at a runway show. Episode 3 feature Zumbo returning to his hometown, Coonamble, to help cater for one of the biggest events of the year – his father's 70th birthday.

== Personal life ==
In 2017, Zumbo and My Kitchen Rules contestant Nelly Riggio began dating. On 6 May, 12 months after he proposed, the couple married. Adriano and Nelly welcomed their first child, Maximus Mario, in October 2023 and their second child, Sofia Rosa, in August 2025.
