= Frankie McNair =

Australian comedian

Comedy career
- Years active: 2017–present
- Genres: Stand-up; cabaret; character
- Website: frankiemcnair.com

Frankie McNair (born 1994 or 1993) is an Australian comedian. She (Note: McNair uses she/her and they/them pronouns. This article uses she/her pronouns for consistency.) has performed several comedy shows including Big Dumb Idiot (2019), Relax Your Knees (2022) for which she won Best Newcomer at the Melbourne International Comedy Festival (MICF), and Huge-Ass Mindset (2026) which was nominated at the MICF for Most Outstanding Show and won Sydney Comedy Festival's Best of the Fest award. McNair has appeared on television in Thank God You're Here, Question Everything, Safe Home and Aunty Donna's Coffee Cafe.

McNair is known for her character Tabitha Booth, a cabaret performer who is no longer famous, which originated as part of Relax Your Knees. She has gone on to play Booth in her solo show An Intimate Evening with Tabitha Booth (2024), as well as the mockumentary series The Untold Story of Tabitha Booth (2025) which McNair also wrote and co-produced.

== Career ==
McNair states that she began her comedy career at an open mic in 2017; she "got thrown when someone laughed at a joke," and "just blanked on the rest of my set and froze on stage", though tried again the next week. In 2019, she moved to Melbourne. She was due to perform her show Big Dumb Idiot, which she said was "about stopping to do things and embrace the fact that you're a big, dumb idiot", at the Canberra Comedy Festival in March 2020. During the COVID-19 pandemic, she stayed in Victoria, Melbourne for the first wave of the virus, beginning a podcast called Worst Gigs, though moved back to Canberra just prior to Melbourne lockdowns for the second wave. Canberra was not affected by lockdowns during this time, allowing her to continue her work.

In 2021, alongside Emma Holland, McNair created the show Emma's Debutante. Ideated by Holland and McNair in 2018, it was set at the debutante ball of 16-year-old Emma (Holland), and featured the character of Emma's mother and former cabaret artist Michelle (McNair), who wanted to be at the centre of attention instead of Emma despite being supportive of her daughter. The act was supported by a selection of nightly interchangeable guest comedians who would play characters, perform sketches, or do stand-up. These included Ben Russell, Cameron James, Danielle Walker and Randy Feltface at shows in Brisbane, Sydney and Melbourne prior to their shows at the MICF that year, which included Feltface again as well as Tim Clark. Both Beat and The Age described the show as a soap opera, the latter giving it 4 stars of 5 and calling it a "comedy festival hit".

McNair has since expressed that around this time, she "wanted to quit", though decided to do "one last show". In 2022, she performed her show Relax Your Knees at the MICF, for which she won the award for Best Newcomer, and continued to perform Emma's Debutante alongside Holland. Chortle gave the show 3.5 stars of 5, comparing her "animated physicality and exaggerated expressions" to Felicity Ward. Appearing on the ABC show Question Everything as well as Just For Laughs in 2022, she continued Relax Your Knees into 2023 at the Soho Theatre in London; The Guardian gave it 3 stars of 5. She kept touring the show in Australia into April 2023, changing it over time. She again was part of Emma's Debutante at the 2023 MICF. By 2025, McNair had appeared on the TV show Thank God You're Here. She had also appeared as an actor in Safe Home and Aunty Donna's Coffee Cafe. McNair that year was working a day job as a 'Captain Starlight' at a children's hospital.

At the MICF in 2026, McNair's show Huge-Ass Mindset covered topics such as child sexual abuse, anti-depressants, her late autism diagnosis, and queerness. Titled in reference to the phrase 'big dick energy', it received a nomination for Most Outstanding Show, and later shared the Best of the Fest award with Reuben Kaye at the Sydney Comedy Festival. Writing that McNair "makes light of dark subjects with a gleeful flippancy that would raise the eyebrows of even the edgiest shock comic", The Age gave the show 4 stars of 5, as did InDaily South Australia. Chortle gave it 5 stars of 5. Scenestr called it "equal parts empowering, important and downright silly", and stated that the show had a "full-on but worthwhile finale". At her debut at the Edinburgh Festival Fringe, The Guardian gave the show four stars of five, prompting the New York Times to list the show as one that was "winning over viewers and critics". McNair also won the Mental Health Foundation Fringe Award which had been running annually since 2017, becoming the first comedian to do so.

McNair will be a contestant on Taskmaster Australia Season 6 in 2027.

=== Tabitha Booth ===
McNair is best known for playing a character known as Tabitha Booth, a cabaret performer past the height of her fame. This character derives from a section called 'long fork lady' in McNair's 2022 show Relax Your Knees, in which she has said she "taped a fork to the end of an antenna", and "would just keep making it longer and would sing 'long fork lady'". This then morphed into the Tabitha Booth character. McNair has cited Liza Minnelli, Judy Garland, and Gloria Swanson as inspirations for the character, as well as "the idea of all them being almost discarded", and her own past experience of wanting to quit comedy. She has called the character "obscene" and "desperate". Chortle concurred in the character's similarity to Minelli, remarking that she had "sozzled lounge singer energy".

At the Adelaide Fringe in 2024, McNair properly introduced the character in her show An Intimate Evening with Tabitha Booth. This solo show, originally written in 2023, consists of a retrospective of Booth's life with an intentional lack of budget. Eilidh McKenzie of Binge Fringe compared the character to the likes of Alexandra Del Lago and Blanche DuBois, giving the show four stars of five. McNair also performed the show at the Feast Festival in November 2024. In 2025, McNair released a six-part mockumentary series, The Untold Story of Tabitha Booth, on Grouse House. McNair wrote and co-produced the series herself, the former alongside her friend Harris Stuckey, using a $5000 budget. It follows Booth, played by McNair, as she tries to revive her career with a 'comeback' show.

== Awards and nominations ==
Awards and nominations for Frankie McNair
Year	Nominated work	Category	Award	Result	Notes	Ref.
2022	Relax Your Knees	Best Newcomer	Melbourne International Comedy Festival Awards	Won		
2026	Huge-Ass Mindset	Most Outstanding Show	Melbourne International Comedy Festival Awards	Nominated		
2026	Huge-Ass Mindset	Best of the Fest	Sydney Comedy Festival Awards	Won	Shared win with Reuben Kaye	
2026	Huge-Ass Mindset	Fringe Award	Mental Health Foundation	Won		

== Personal life ==
McNair is gender-fluid and bisexual and has attention deficit hyperactivity disorder, autism and complex PTSD. She survived sexual assault as a child, and as of 2026 has been in therapy for 12 years.
