= Cornel Wilczek =

Cornel Wilcczek may refer to:

- Cornel Wilczek (composer), Australian composer
- Cornel Wilcczek (weightlifter), Australian weightlifter at the 1960 Summer Olympics
