= Community channel =

Community channel may refer to:

- Community television in general
- Together TV, a UK television channel formerly known as The Community Channel
- Natalie Tran, Australian actress and YouTuber who goes by the online handle "communitychannel"
