= Question Everything (TV series) =

Australian comedy TV series

- Genre: Panel show
- Created by: Wil Anderson
- Presented by: Wil Anderson and Jan Fran
- Country of origin: Australia
- Original language: English
- No. of seasons: 4
- No. of episodes: 37

Production
- Running time: 30 minutes
- Production company: CJZ

Original release
- Network: ABC
- Release: 18 August 2021 – 11 December 2024

Question Everything was an Australian comedy panel television show hosted by Wil Anderson, which first screened on ABC TV on 18 August 2021. The show featured four celebrity panellists, led by Jan Fran. The panel were asked to dissect the news, sort the real from the rumours, separate fact from fiction and flatten conspiracy theories, fake stories, false claims, scams, frauds and outright lies. It also featured pre-recorded segments by Fran called "Jan-splaining".

In October 2023, a live version of the show was brought to SXSW Sydney.

A fourth season aired in late 2024. In August 2025, the series was cancelled by the ABC.

== Episodes ==
Series	Episodes	Originally released	
Series	Episodes	First released	Last released
1	8	18 August 2021	6 October 2021
2	10	28 September 2022	30 November 2022
3	9	18 October 2023	13 December 2023
4	10	9 October 2024	11 December 2024

=== Series 1 (2021) ===
No. in season	Original release date	Australian viewers
1	18 August 2021	570,000
Guests: Luke Heggie, Alexei Toliopoulos, Concetta Caristo
2	25 August 2021	483,000
Guests: Lauren Bonner, Fady Kassab, Greta Lee Jackson
3	1 September 2021	466,000
Guests: Dane Simpson, Susie Youssef, Tom Cashman
4	8 September 2021	410,000
Guests: Nina Oyama, Luke Heggie, Vic Zerbst
5	15 September 2021	416,000
Guests: Alexei Toliopoulos, Alice Fraser, Aaron Chen
6	22 September 2021	429,000
Guests: Mark Humphries, Tom Cashman, Bec Melrose
7	29 September 2021	424,000
Guests: Wendy Harmer, Danielle Walker, Alexei Toliopoulos
8	6 October 2021	440,000
Guests: Julia Zemiro, Aaron Chen, Bec Melrose

=== Series 2 (2022) ===
No. in season	Original release date	Australian viewers
1	28 September 2022	401,000
Guests: Matt Parkinson, Kirsty Webeck, Tom Ballard
2	5 October 2022	415,000
Guests: James O'Loghlin, Claire Hooper, Alexei Toliopoulos
3	12 October 2022	338,000
Guests: Dave O'Neil, Jordan Raskopoulos, Frankie McNair
4	19 October 2022	381,000
Guests: Mark Humphries, Geraldine Hickey, Cameron James
5	26 October 2022	464,000
Guests: Matt Parkinson, Alex Lee, Nath Valvo
6	2 November 2022	437,000
Guests: Mark Humphries, Kirsty Webeck, Luke Heggie
7	9 November 2022	387,000
Guests: Tom Gleeson, Mel Buttle, Blake Freeman
8	16 November 2022	408,000
Guests: Alex Lee, Charlie Pickering, Paul McDermott
9	23 November 2022	386,000
Guests: Wendy Harmer, Dan Ilic, Bec Melrose
10	30 November 2022	424,000
Guests: Carl Barron, Mel Buttle, Blake Freeman

=== Series 3 (2023) ===
No. in season	Original release date	Australian viewers
1	18 October 2023	303,000
Guests: Alex Lee, Geraldine Hickey, Nath Valvo
2	25 October 2023	319,000
Guests: Mel Buttle, Tom Ballard, Lizzy Hoo
3	1 November 2023	351,000
Guests: Mark Humphries, Dane Simpson, Bec Melrose
4	8 November 2023	429,000
Guests: Rhys Nicholson, Zoë Coombs Marr, Alex Lee
5	15 November 2023	358,000
Guests: Kirsty Webeck, Mel Buttle, Dilruk Jayasinha
6	22 November 2023	387,000
Guests: Tom Gleeson, Lizzy Hoo, Gareth Reynolds
7	29 November 2023	382,000
Guests: Alex Lee, Mel Buttle, Suren Jayemanne
8	6 December 2023	370,000
Guests: Nath Valvo, Geraldine Hickey, Brett Blake
9	13 December 2023	330,000
Guests: Matt Parkinson, Tom Ballard, Kirsty Webeck

=== Series 4 (2024) ===
No. in season	Original release date	Australian viewers
1	9 October 2024	N/A
Guests: Concetta Caristo, Kirsty Webeck, Matt Parkinson
2	16 October 2024	N/A
Guests: Nath Valvo, Geraldine Hickey, Tom Cashman
3	23 October 2024	N/A
Guests: Tom Ballard, Alex Lee, Brett Blake
4	30 October 2024	N/A
Guests: Matt Parkinson, Mel Buttle, Gillian Cosgriff
5	6 November 2024	N/A
Guests: Nath Valvo, Geraldine Hickey, Sashi Perera
6	13 November 2024	N/A
Guests: Charlie Pickering, Lizzy Hoo, Josh Earl
7	20 November 2024	N/A
Guests: Mark Humphries, Cameron James, Gen Fricker
8	27 November 2024	N/A
Guests: Takashi Wakasugi, Kirsty Webeck, Matt Parkinson
9	4 December 2024	N/A
Guests: Tom Ballard, Lizzy Hoo, Concetta Caristo
10	11 December 2024	N/A
Guests: Mel Buttle, Gillian Cosgriff, Suren Jayemanne
