= Nina Oyama =

Australian comedian, writer, actress and director

- Born: 18 August 1993 (age 33); Bathurst, New South Wales, Australia
- Occupations: Comedian; writer; actress; director
- Years active: 2012–present
- Known for: Utopia, Tonightly with Tom Ballard, The Angus Project

Nina Oyama (born 18 August 1993) is an Australian comedian, writer, actress and director. She is well known for her roles in Utopia, Deadloch and her participation as contestant in Taskmaster Australia.

== Early life and education ==
Oyama was born on 18 August 1993 to an Australian mother from Sydney's Northern Beaches and a Japanese father. Her parents met at a hostel in Nagoya.

She attended North Sydney Girls High School, and went on to study communications and theatre media at Charles Sturt University in Bathurst, New South Wales.

== Career ==
Oyama began performing stand-up comedy at 17 years old. In 2012, she was a state finalist in the Class Clowns competition. That year she also performed at The Sydney Fringe as part of "Barely Legal - Australia's Best Young Comedians" alongside Neel Kolhatkar and Aaron Chen, and performed on Dan Ilic's FBi Radio show. Oyama became a writer for the children's sketch comedy show You're Skitting Me, and made her television debut performing stand-up comedy on SBS 2 in 2014.

In 2017, Oyama was cast as executive assistant/receptionist Courtney Kano in the third, fourth, and fifth seasons of Utopia. In the same year, she joined the cast of ABC Comedy's topical entertainment show Tonightly with Tom Ballard as a writer; she also starred in the second and final series of the show in 2018.

Oyama directed, co-wrote, and co-starred in The Angus Project, a web series and television pilot that aired on ABC iview in 2018. Based on real events in Bathurst, the series co-stars Angus Thompson as a sports journalist with cerebral palsy, for whom Oyama becomes a friend and caregiver. The show received praise for its earnest depictions of disability and regional Australia.

As of 2019 Oyama was regularly performing stand-up comedy.

In 2020, she starred on the Network 10 sketch comedy series Kinne Tonight, and served as a scriptwriter for Michael Cusack's Adult Swim series YOLO: Crystal Fantasy. She co-directed the film Diving In, which starred an amputee swimmer and was featured in the 2020 Sydney Film Festival. Also in that year, Oyama received media attention for making "#CatPoop" a trending topic on Twitter in Australia.

On 9 July 2024, Deadloch was renewed for a second season and it was announced that Oyama would reprise the role of Abby Matsuda. On 28 October, Oyama was named for the animated film The Pout Pout Fish.

On 4 June 2025, Oyama was announced as part of the cast for the series Gnomes.

== Personal life ==
Oyama is bisexual and bipolar.

== Filmography ==
=== Television appearances ===
Year	Title	Role	Notes
2026	Class Clowns	Self	6 episodes
2026	Gnomes		
2025	Claire Hooper's House Of Games	Self	5 episodes
2025	The Role of a Lifetime	Dr. Jesse	2 episodes
2023–present	Deadloch	Abby Matsuda	14 episodes
2023	Home and Away	Slyvie Grey	2 episodes
2023	We Interrupt This Broadcast	Melissa Leong	7 episodes
2023	Koala Man	Little Nina	1 episode
2021	Mikki vs The World	Various	Series 1
2020	The Chasers War on 2020	Various	
2020	Moments of Clarity	Nat	5 episodes
2020	Dom and Adrian	Debbie	TV Special
2019–2020	Kinne Tonight	Various	13 episodes
2017–2019, 2023	Utopia	Courtney	16 episodes
2018	Fresh Blood Pilot Season	Nina	1 episode

=== Film appearances ===
Year	Title	Role	Notes
2020	Soulless	Danni	Short
2020	The Complex	Megan	Short
2026	The Pout-Pout Fish	Pip	Film

=== Other appearances ===
Year	Title	Notes
2019	Spicks and Specks	1 episode
2021	Question Everything	1 episode
2023	Have You Been Paying Attention?	1 episode, as guest quiz master
2023	Taskmaster Australia	Season 1 contestant 10 episodes
2023	Would I Lie to You?	1 episode
2024	Guy Montgomery's Guy Mont-Spelling Bee (NZ)	2 episodes
2024	Thank God You’re Here	1 episode
2025	Claire Hooper’s House of Games	5 episodes
2025	Guy Montgomery's Guy Mont-Spelling Bee (AU)	1 episode

Writer
Year	Title	Role	Notes
2023	Monologue	Writer	2 episodes
2023	Class of '07	Developer	8 episodes
2023	Koala Man	Writer	1 episode
2022	Latecomers	Creator/Writer	6 episodes
2020	Diving In	Writer	Short
2020	The Chaser's War on 2020	Writer	
2020	YOLO: Crystal Fantasy	Writer	1 episode
2019	Squinters	Additional Material	6 episodes
2018	Fresh Blood Pilot Season	Writer	1 episode
2017–2018	Tonightly with Tom Ballard	Writer	161 episodes
2013–2016	You're Skitting Me	Additional Material	39 episodes
2016	The Chaser's Election Desk	Additional Material	5 episodes

== Awards and nominations ==
- 2018: Pilot of The Angus Project nominated for an Australian Directors' Guild award
- 2019: Nominated, Best Newcomer at the Melbourne International Comedy Festival
