= Cornel Wilczek (composer) =

- Genres: Film and television scoring, experimental music
- Occupations: Composer, record producer
- Years active: 2000s–present
- Website: www.cornelwilczek.com

Cornel Wilczek is an Australian film and television composer based in Melbourne. He is a three-time AACTA Award winner known for his work on horror films such as Talk to Me (2022), Bring Her Back and Together (both in 2025).

== Early life and education ==
Wilczek hails from Adelaide and relocated to Melbourne in 2000 to study at RMIT University under composers Philip Brophy and Philip Samartzis. There, he developed an experimental approach blending acoustic and electronic elements.

== Career ==
Wilczek owns and operates Electric Dreams Studio in South Melbourne, recognized as one of Australia's most awarded music studios. As a record producer, he has worked on over 30 albums for local and international artists, including award-winning releases for The Wagons and My Disco.

His compositional style emphasizes color, contrast, and hybrid techniques, merging traditional orchestration with experimental processing tools like Guitar Rig. He has scored 16 feature films and 17 television series.

== Personal life ==
Wilczek resides in Melbourne. He is of Polish descent.

== Selected filmography ==
Year	Title	Notes
2022	Talk to Me	AACTA nomination; A24 horror film
2025	Bring Her Back	Second collaboration with Danny and Michael Philippou
2025	Together	Directed by Michael Shanks; body horror
