= Michael Shanks (filmmaker) =

Australian filmmaker

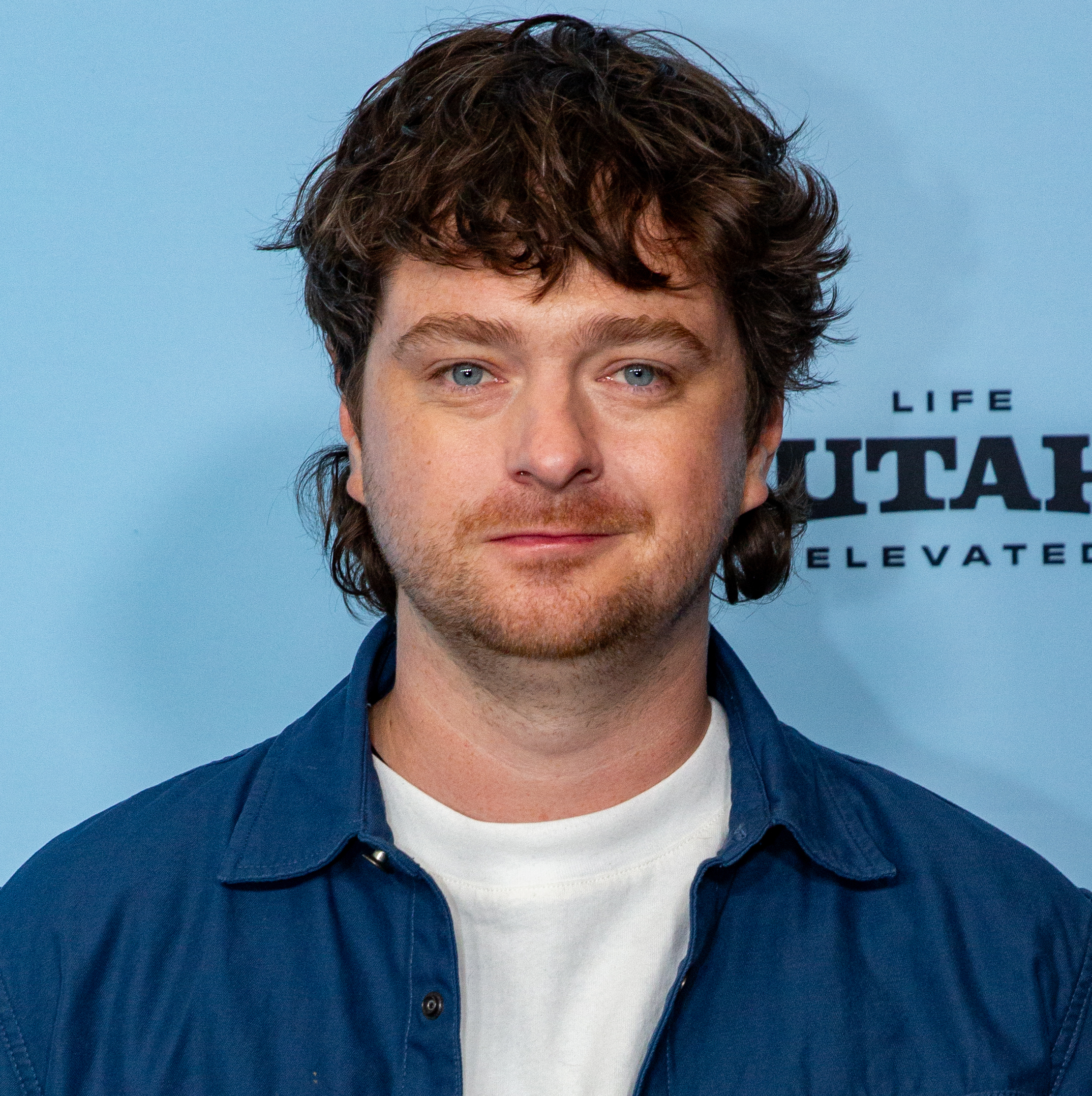
- Shanks at the 2025 Sundance Film Festival
- Born: 1990 or 1991 (age 35–36); Christchurch, New Zealand
- Occupations: Filmmaker; Actor; Composer; YouTuber
- Years active: 2006–present
- Notable work: Together (2025); The Wizards of Aus (2016)
- Website: michaelshanks.com.au

Michael Shanks (born 1990 or 1991) is an Australian filmmaker, actor and composer, known for directing Together (2025) and The Wizards of Aus (2016). He also created the YouTube channel timtimfed, which has been active since September 2006.

== Early life ==
Shanks was born in either 1990 or 1991 in Christchurch, New Zealand. He lived there until the age of 12, when he and his family moved to Newport, a suburb of Melbourne, Australia. He wrote and directed for his high school's theater program and taught himself how to create visual effects by watching online tutorial videos.

== Career ==
As a grade 12 student, Shanks won the 2008 film competition run by The Escapist to produce a web series pilot episode. The pilot developed into Doomsday Arcade, a 25-part web series. Shanks views creating the series "as [his] film school".

In 2013, Shanks wrote and directed the short film Time Trap. He also directed music videos for Guy Pearce. He directed a segment of a 2015 episode of the Adult Swim series Off the Air.

In 2016, he both directed and starred in the SBS comedy-fantasy series The Wizards of Aus. Shanks plays a wizard who emigrates to Melbourne and faces backlash from the local community. Originally devised as a six-part online series, it aired on SBS 2 as three thirty-minute episodes.

Shanks directed the sketch comedy series The Slot in 2017. Two years later he directed the short film Rebooted.

His feature directorial debut, Together, screened at the 2025 Sundance Film Festival. Starring Dave Franco and Alison Brie as a couple who encounter a supernatural transformation, the body horror film was distributed by Neon, who acquired the film for $17 million.

In September 2025, Shanks is set to direct and produce his script, Hotel Hotel Hotel Hotel, which, prior to being picked up by A24, was included in 2021's The Black List of the "most-liked" unproduced screenplays.

In March 2026, Shanks was announced as the writer of an untitled science fiction comedy feature acquired by Sony Pictures, with Adam McKay attached to direct. The project is being produced by McKay and Todd Schulman through Hyperobject Industries, alongside Andrew Mittman, with Kai Dolbashian serving as executive producer.

== Influences ==
Shanks has named Lord of the Rings, The Hitchhiker's Guide to the Galaxy and Monty Python as early creative inspirations. He has also named filmmakers Edgar Wright, Ari Aster, David Lynch, Thom Yorke, John Carpenter, Peter Jackson, Bong Joon Ho, and M. Night Shyamalan as influences.

== Personal life ==
Shanks has been in a relationship with his girlfriend since 2010. He resides in Melbourne.

== Filmography ==
=== Film ===
Year	Film	Role				Notes	Role	Ref.
Year	Film	Director	Screenwriter	Composer	Actor	Notes	Role	Ref.
2013	Time Trap	Yes	Yes	Yes	No	Short	N/A	
2019	Rebooted	Yes	Yes	Yes	Yes	Short	10,000 Sandals Director	
2019	Parked	Yes	No	No	No	Short		
2025	Together	Yes	Yes	No	Yes	Feature debut	Simon	

=== Television ===
Year	Film	Role				Notes	Role	Ref.
Year	Film	Director	Screenwriter	Composer	Actor	Notes	Role	Ref.
2015	Off the Air	Yes	Yes	No	Yes	Season 5, episode 3: "Stare Down"		
2016	The Wizards of Aus	Yes	Yes	Yes	Yes	Co-written with Nicholas Issell	Jack	
2018	The Slot	Yes	Yes	No	Yes	Directed episode 5, Co-written with Nicholas Issell		
