= Melanie Beddie =

Australian actor

- Occupations: Actress, director, dramaturg, and acting teacher

Melanie Beddie is an Australian actress, director, dramaturg, and acting teacher. She is founder and director of Branch Theatre Company.

== Early life and education ==
Beddie completed a BA in English and Philosophy at Sydney University from 1981 to 1984. It was here, through an association with Sydney University Dramatic Society (SUDS) and she acted in and directed numerous productions with the society. She was President of SUDS in 1984.

She moved from Sydney to Melbourne to train as an actress at the Victorian College of Arts (VCA) School of Drama from 1985 to 1987.

She later completed a PhD (2017) on acting training at La Trobe University.

== Career ==
Beddie started her career with Arena Theatre Company, and continued to work nationally as an actor across a wide range of professional companies such as Melbourne Theatre Company (MTC), Playbox, Going Through Stages, HotHouse Theatre, and Playworks and at the Australian National Playwrights Conferences.

Beddie co-founded, with a group of other artists, an independent theatre company, the $5 Theatre Company, as funding became scarcer in the 1990s. They had a strong political motive in making theatre affordable, and played to full houses, showing that people did want to attend theatre. Co founding The Dramaturges Project , she helped develop the concept and practice of dramaturgy, which she says is "mostly about asking questions" – finding out what the kernel of the production is and helping to hone it towards that. She worked with Andrew Bovell and others at $5 Theatre.

In 1994 she appeared in Remember Ronald Ryan, and in 2000 directed Violet Inc. at the Malthouse Theatre.

Beddie founded the Branch Theatre Company in 1998, still operational in 2026, which she uses for her own experimentation now and then.)

She was resident dramaturg at the MTC from 1998 to 1999. She has directed productions at MTC, Playbox, HotHouse, La Mama, Playworks, and Hit Productions, as well as in smaller companies and in drama schools. In the 2000s, she gained an Australia Council Fellowship to extend the boundaries of dramaturgy in Australia . In 2010 she received a Gloria scholarship from NIDA to investigate approaches to inclusion for more cultural diversity in Australian theatre and screen.

She co-founded Australian Women Directors Alliance (AWDA) in the 2000s, which advocated for more roles for women in theatre, particularly through the Melbourne Theatre Company, achieving a degree of equity through conversations with the theatre community and theatre boards. .

In February 2018 she directed Crazy Brave by Michael Gurr at La Mama.

She has also appeared in a short films and features and several television series, including Neighbours, Blue Heelers and Halifax f.p..

She has also taught at WAAPA and extensively at VCA.from 2010-2016 she was Lecturer in Acting at VCA School of Theatre ,She has published several papers on acting training and related topics, is as of August 2022 is the Lecturer in Acting at Federation University Australia .

Filmography

=== Television ===
Year	Title	Role	Notes
1990	The Flying Doctors	Cecily	1 episode
1993	Snowy	Woman	1 episode
1997	Simone de Beauvoir's Babies	Stephanie	2 episodes
1999	Halifax f.p.	Julie Colless	1 episode
1999-03	Blue Heelers	Annie Jones / Marica Budd	2 episodes
2002	MDA	Jane Thomas	1 episode
2003	After The Deluge	Nurse Judy	TV Movie
2015	Wentworth (TV series)	Jane Eason	1 episode
2017	Newton's Law (TV series)	Maeve Kelly	1 episode
2018-22	Neighbours	Annie Barnes / Caroline Alexander	2 episodes
2023	Five Bedrooms	Ingrid	1 episode
2026	Breakers		1 episode

=== Film ===
Year	Title	Role	Notes
1994	Only The Brave	Teacher in Office	
2009	Blessed	Young Laurel	
2011	Taj	Jane	
2012	Road to Recovery	Cybil	Short
2025	Together	Millie's mother	Directed by Michael Shanks
2025	I Fall to Pieces		Charles Leversha

== Recognition and awards ==
- Recipient of the inaugural Dramaturgy Fellowship from the Australia Council
- Gloria Award from NIDA
- Director's Choice Award for Infectious, a cross-art form cabaret
- Green Room Award for Best Director for Traitors by Stephen Sewell
- 2001: Director of an award-winning production of Raindancers at MTC
- 2009: Co-director, with Rachael Maza, Sisters of Gelam, nominated for a Deadly Award
