= Nath Valvo =

Australian comedian

Nath Valvo (born 11 December 1983) is an Australian comedian, screenwriter, and actor. Valvo's comedic style often revolves around personal anecdotes, social commentary, and pop culture references.

== Career ==
=== Stand-up comedy ===
Valvo began writing and performing in a comedy sketch group called The Shambles, which was shown on community television across Australia and performed live. In 2006, The Shambles DVD was nominated for an ARIA award for Best Comedy Release.

Valvo started solo stand-up comedy in 2013 with his show Grindr: A Love Story?, which was based on his sexual experiences using the dating app. He has since performed at major comedy festivals in Australia.

Valvo was nominated for Best Newcomer for his comedy show Happy Idiot at the 2016 Edinburgh Fringe Festival. He then performed the show at London's Soho Theatre. In 2018, Valvo performed at the Just for Laughs festival at the Tiffany Haddish Gala.

Valvo's stand-up show I'm Happy For You was nominated for Best Show at the Melbourne International Comedy Festival. The show was filmed and released as a stand-up special for Paramount Plus Valvo recently hosted the New Faces International show at the Montreal Comedy Festival.

=== Television ===
Valvo has appeared on numerous Australian panel shows including Would I Lie to You? Australia, Patriot Brains, Question Everything, Spicks and Specks, Hughesy, We Have a Problem, Tomorrow Tonight, Show Me the Movie!, Celebrity Name Game, The Project Australia, and I'm a Celebrity Get Me Out of Here.

In 2020, Valvo hosted the National Raw Comedy Final which aired on SBS.

Valvo has hosted two seasons of the Australian series Just For Laughs. In 2025 he appeared as a contestant on Claire Hooper's House Of Games.

=== Television Writing ===
Valvo wrote for the Australian sketch show Open Slather, and in 2022 he co-wrote for the ABC comedy series Summer Love (Episode 5, "Luke and Olly"), which was nominated for Most Outstanding Comedy Program at the 2023 Logie Awards.

=== Radio ===
In 2014, Valvo hosted the National Night Show (10 PM–1 AM) for Nova FM. He then went on to host The Saturday Morning Breaky Show on Nova 100 in Melbourne.

== Personal life ==
Valvo married his long-time partner, Cody, in 2023.

== Recognition ==
In his review of the 2019 MICF, Michael Lallo of The Age wrote, "a perfectly honed one-hour set that spans long-term relationships, retired parents, and the annoyingly good life choices of others." The Herald Sun review of Valvo's show Tongue in Cheek stated, "darting from G-rated to R18+ material within seconds, the rising Australian star has hit the comedic bullseye."

The Scotsman wrote, "Once the audience has accepted Nath Valvo is the person in charge of the room, it is time to relax and enjoy an hour of superbly framed stories, full of big, uncomplicated laughs."
