= Taskmaster Australia =

Australian comedy television program

- Also known as: Taskmaster
- Genre: Comedy; Panel game
- Created by: Alex Horne
- Based on: Taskmaster by Alex Horne
- Developed by: Cam Bakker
- Written by: Tom Cashman; Sam Smith
- Directed by: Tom Furniss; Andy Devonshire
- Presented by: Tom Gleeson; Tom Cashman
- Theme music composer: The Horne Section
- Country of origin: Australia
- Original language: English
- No. of series: 5
- No. of episodes: 50

Production
- Executive producers: Alex Horne; Richard Allen-Turner; Rob Aslett; James Taylor; Jon Thoday; Andy Devonshire; Sarah Thornton
- Producer: Cam Bakker
- Production locations: Sydney, Australia (seasons 1–2, 4–present; studio filming); Melbourne, Australia (season 3; studio filming); North Auckland, New Zealand (task filming)
- Running time: 47 minutes
- Production companies: Kevin & Co; Avalon Television

Original release
- Network: Network 10
- Release: 2 February 2023 – present

Related
- Taskmaster (British TV series); Taskmaster New Zealand

Taskmaster Australia is an Australian comedy panel game show first broadcast on Network 10 on 2 February 2023. Based on the British show Taskmaster created by comedian Alex Horne, the program revolves around a group of five celebrities – mainly comedians – attempting to complete a series of challenges, judged by the "Taskmaster", Tom Gleeson, and accompanied by his assistant, comedian Tom Cashman, frequently referred to as "Lesser Tom".

The show's first season was broadcast in early 2023, and the second and third seasons aired in 2024. Season four was filmed in late 2024 and premiered on 27 March 2025. Season five aired in 2026, and a sixth season has been confirmed to premiere in 2027.

== Format ==
Taskmaster is a comedic panel show where five contestants compete in the completion of tasks set by "The Taskmaster" (Tom Gleeson) and umpired by the "Taskmaster's Assistant" (Tom Cashman). The tasks can involve physical, creative and lateral thinking skills.

Following the format of the British version, in each episode contestants compete for five prizes that they have brought in, along a theme that they are ranked against for points. Three pre-recorded tasks—completed separately by each contestant (or occasionally in teams)—are shown and judged in the studio by The Taskmaster. Tasks are filmed within the Taskmaster Retreat, with the areas including The Lounge, The Kitchen, The Lab and The Caravan. A final live task takes place in the studio. As well as winners within each episode, one contestant becomes the winner of the series and takes home a trophy modelled after The Taskmaster's head.

== Cast ==
In the studio, other than while attempting the live task, the contestants sit on a row of chairs in alphabetical order of forename from left to right.

Key

- * Series champion

Series	Year	Seating				
Series	Year	1st	2nd	3rd	4th	5th
1	2023	Danielle Walker *	Jimmy Rees	Julia Morris	Luke McGregor	Nina Oyama
2	2024	Anne Edmonds	Jenny Tian	Josh Thomas	Lloyd Langford *	Wil Anderson
3	2024	Aaron Chen *	Concetta Caristo	Mel Buttle	Peter Helliar	Rhys Nicholson
4	2025	Dave Hughes	Emma Holland *	Lisa McCune	Takashi Wakasugi	Tommy Little
5	2026	Anisa Nandaula	Brett Blake	Celia Pacquola	Joel Creasey	Rove McManus *
6	2027	Charlie Pickering	Frankie McNair	Shane Jacobson	Tom Walker	Urzila Carlson

== Production ==
The Taskmaster franchise was conceived by Alex Horne and first televised in Britain, where Horne plays the Taskmaster's Assistant. The British version debuted in 2015. Confirmation of an Australian version was announced in October 2022, to be produced by Avalon Television (the British production company) with New Zealand-based Kevin & Co. for Network 10. This is the first Kevin & Co. production outside New Zealand.

The pre-recorded tasks were filmed in the same house and grounds, Jennie Hu's Boutique Venue on Croft Lane, Riverhead, New Zealand that Taskmaster NZ uses. It is known as "The Taskmaster Retreat" in the Australian version and "The Taskmaster Ranch" in the New Zealand version. Filming took up to ten hours per day.

Filming for the studio shows took place in December 2022 at the NEP Studios in Eveleigh, Sydney, New South Wales. Gleeson remarked of the filming, that it was the first show he had done where "right from the very first episode, all the audience seats were sold out".

Tasks for the series were written by a team, which includes Sam Smith (who also writes tasks for the New Zealand version), alongside Cashman, with development assisted by show producer Cam Bakker, and, as with all the international adaptations, sent to show creator Alex Horne for final approval. Executive producer Sarah Thornton remarked that the aim is to bring in new writers each series to "keep it fresh".

In July 2023, a second series began filming in Melbourne, Victoria for a 2024 airdate. The cast was revealed on 10 July 2023 as Peter Helliar, Mel Buttle, Aaron Chen, Concetta Caristo, and Rhys Nicholson.

Studio filming for a third series took place in the week beginning 18 March 2024. The cast was confirmed as Anne Edmonds, Jenny Tian, Josh Thomas, Lloyd Langford and Wil Anderson on 21 March 2024.

In May 2024, it was announced that the third filmed series would instead air as season two in mid-2024, and the second filmed series would air in late 2024.

== Episodes ==
Series	Episodes	Originally released	
Series	Episodes	First released	Last released
1	10	2 February 2023	6 April 2023
2	10	23 May 2024	25 July 2024
3	10	24 September 2024	26 November 2024
4	10	27 March 2025	29 May 2025
5	10	7 May 2026	9 July 2026
6	10	2027	TBA

=== Series 1 (2023) ===
The first series consists of 10 episodes and was broadcast on Network 10 starting on 2 February 2023. In order of placement, the contestants were Danielle Walker, Jimmy Rees, Julia Morris, Luke McGregor and Nina Oyama.

For team tasks in this series, the team of three was made up of Rees, McGregor and Oyama, with the team of two consisting of Walker and Morris.

Walker was the winner of the series, with Morris as runner-up, Rees in 3rd, Oyama in 4th, and McGregor in 5th.

The following year, series 1 episodes were made available on the official Taskmaster YouTube channel.

No.	Title	Winner	Original release date	Australian viewers (overnight)
1	"Foot Juice"	Danielle Walker	2 February 2023	360,000
2	"Keep It Clean and Flowing"	Nina Oyama	9 February 2023	305,000
3	"Cricketmaster"	Julia Morris	16 February 2023	314,000
4	"BOOM BOOM BOOM BOOM"	Jimmy Rees	23 February 2023	302,000
5	"Are You Okay?"	Julia Morris	2 March 2023	309,000
6	"Lucky with a Sausage"	Danielle Walker	9 March 2023	304,000
7	"The Energy of a Sickly Child"	Jimmy Rees	16 March 2023	270,000
8	"Dumb in Unison"	Julia Morris	23 March 2023	242,000
9	"Sorry for Your Loss"	Jimmy Rees	30 March 2023	235,000
10	"Don't Ask Me What a JC Is"	Danielle Walker	6 April 2023	269,000

=== Series 2 (2024) ===
Originally filmed as the third series, the second series consists of ten episodes and was broadcast on Network 10 starting on 23 May 2024. In order of placement, the contestants were Anne Edmonds, Jenny Tian, Josh Thomas, Lloyd Langford and Wil Anderson.

For team tasks in this series, the team of three was made up of Tian, Langford and Anderson, with the team of two consisting of Edmonds and Thomas.

Langford was the winner of the series after a tie-breaker, with Edmonds as runner-up, Anderson in 3rd, Tian in 4th, and Thomas in 5th.

Series 2 episodes were released weekly on the official Taskmaster YouTube channel.

No. overall	No. in series	Title	Winner	Original release date	Australian viewers (national) (Note: On 28 January 2024, OzTAM's ratings data recording system changed. Viewership data will now focus on National Reach and National Total ratings instead of providing data on the 5 metro centres and overnight shares.)
11	1	"Don't Slip on the Chips Old Man"	Wil Anderson	23 May 2024	409,000
12	2	"A Hotly Contested Auction"	Lloyd Langford	30 May 2024	368,000
13	3	"Answer the Phone Gary"	Lloyd Langford	6 June 2024	326,000
14	4	"Oink Oink Bitches"	Wil Anderson	13 June 2024	397,000
15	5	"The Moment of Divorce Is Recorded"	Josh Thomas	20 June 2024	444,000
16	6	"Everyone Here Is a Nerd"	Lloyd Langford	27 June 2024	385,000
17	7	"You've Gotta Find the Slop"	Anne Edmonds	4 July 2024	430,000
18	8	"Dingo Dongo"	Josh Thomas	11 July 2024	397,000
19	9	"Killed by a Nerd"	Jenny Tian	18 July 2024	420,000
20	10	"Fun Sexy Wrestle"	Wil Anderson	25 July 2024	431,000

=== Series 3 (2024) ===
Originally filmed as the second series, the third series aired following the conclusion of the second series. It began airing on Network 10 starting on 24 September 2024. The contestants featured this season are Aaron Chen, Concetta Caristo, Mel Buttle, Peter Helliar and Rhys Nicholson.

For team tasks in this series, the team of three was made up of Chen, Helliar and Nicholson, with the team of two consisting of Caristo and Buttle.

Chen was the winner of the series, with Caristo and Helliar as joint runners-up, Nicholson in 4th, and Buttle in 5th.

Season 2 participant Lloyd Langford, celebrity actor Cate Blanchett, and format creator and original Taskmaster assistant Alex Horne each appeared in pre-filmed tasks in the ninth episode, in which the contestants presented the "Most Heavenly Voice".

No. overall	No. in series	Title	Winner	Original release date	Australian viewers (national)
21	1	"For Your Logie Consideration"	Aaron Chen	24 September 2024	414,000
22	2	"Burying a Backpacker"	Mel Buttle	1 October 2024	419,000
23	3	"Mop and Bucket Situation"	Concetta Caristo	8 October 2024	360,000
24	4	"Sorry About the Fingers"	Rhys Nicholson	15 October 2024	367,000
25	5	"Inspired by Pol Pot"	Aaron Chen	22 October 2024	382,000
26	6	"Out-Alpha'd by a Sheep"	Concetta Caristo	29 October 2024	359,000
27	7	"Gimme Some Item"	Aaron Chen	5 November 2024	332,000
28	8	"Tickled in Two Different Ways"	Peter Helliar	12 November 2024	345,000
29	9	"A Bit of a Pickle"	Mel Buttle	19 November 2024	334,000
30	10	"Wee/Wee"	Mel Buttle	26 November 2024	360,000

=== Series 4 (2025) ===
The studio recording of the fourth series were filmed at NEP studios Sydney from 16 to 20 September 2024. Episodes began airing on 27 March 2025. The contestants featured this season are Dave Hughes, Emma Holland, Lisa McCune, Takashi Wakasugi, and Tommy Little.

For team tasks in this series, the team of three was made up of Holland, Wakasugi and Little, with the team of two consisting of Hughes and McCune.

Holland was the winner of the series, with Wakasugi as runner-up, Little in 3rd, McCune in 4th, and Hughes in 5th.

No. overall	No. in series	Title	Winner	Original release date	Australian viewers (national)
31	1	"Wasting a Man's Time"	Emma Holland	27 March 2025	402,000
32	2	"What Is Life?"	Lisa McCune	3 April 2025	347,000
33	3	"Jock on Nerd Action"	Emma Holland	10 April 2025	316,000
34	4	"You Gotta Die of Something, So Let's Go"	Tommy Little	17 April 2025	257,000
35	5	"It's Tickle Time"	Lisa McCune	24 April 2025	271,000
36	6	"Why Are You So Horny?"	Emma Holland	1 May 2025	244,000
37	7	"You've Unleashed the Dragon"	Takashi Wakasugi	8 May 2025	346,000
38	8	"You Can Have Tomorrow Off School"	Takashi Wakasugi	15 May 2025	308,000
39	9	"The Beepie Beepies"	Emma Holland	22 May 2025	335,000
40	10	"Yucky, Yucky, Yucky, That's You"	Dave Hughes	29 May 2025	348,000

=== Series 5 (2026) ===
The studio recording of the fifth series were filmed at NEP studios Sydney from 17 to 21 March 2025. Episodes began airing on 7 May 2026. The contestants featured this series are Anisa Nandaula, Brett Blake, Celia Pacquola, Joel Creasey and Rove McManus.

Taskmaster NZ assistant Paul Williams appeared as Over the dog in a task in Episode 3. Original Taskmaster assistant and format creator Alex Horne featured as a commentator in an Episode 8’s horse racing task.

For team tasks in this series, the team of three was made up of Blake, Pacquola and Creasey, with the team of two consisting of Nandaula and McManus.

McManus was the winner of the series, with Blake as runner-up, Pacquola in 3rd, Nandaula in 4th, and Creasey in 5th.

No. overall	No. in series	Title	Winner	Original release date	Australian viewers (national)
41	1	"Where the War Happened"	Brett Blake	7 May 2026	360,000
42	2	"I'm the Girl One"	Anisa Nandaula	14 May 2026	361,000
43	3	"Very Flaccid Paintbrush"	Brett Blake	21 May 2026	314,000
44	4	"Jesus Would've Nailed This"	Celia Pacquola	28 May 2026	368,000
45	5	"Your Crotch Is Worth 1 Point"	Rove McManus	4 June 2026	309,000
46	6	"Having a Menty B"	Brett Blake	11 June 2026	349,000
47	7	"A Bogan Toddler"	Rove McManus	18 June 2026	392,000
48	8	"Australia's Occasional Sweetheart"	Brett Blake	25 June 2026	367,000
49	9	"Coming Out Lunging"	Joel Creasey	2 July 2026	357,000
50	10	"Give It to Daddy to Pop"	Joel Creasey	9 July 2026	413,000

=== Series 6 (2027) ===
The studio recording of the sixth series were filmed at NEP studios Sydney from 13 to 17 October 2025. The contestants featured this series are Charlie Pickering, Frankie McNair, Shane Jacobson, Tom Walker and Urzila Carlson.

Urzila Carlson previously competed in series 2 of Taskmaster New Zealand.

== Reception ==
=== Critical reception ===
Reviewing the first season, The Age praised that the third episode saw the series "continue to settle in nicely", largely in the style of the British version. The reviewer noted that Gleeson—"a cheerful, friendly-looking chap who has built a career on telling people they suck"—has a different Taskmaster personality to British host Greg Davies.

== See also ==
- List of Australian television series
