= Kinne Tonight =

Australian sketch comedy television series

- Genre: Crude; Comedy
- Created by: Troy Kinne; Max Price
- Written by: Troy Kinne; Max Price
- Directed by: Troy Kinne; Max Price
- Presented by: Troy Kinne
- Starring: See cast
- Country of origin: Australia
- Original language: English
- No. of seasons: 2
- No. of episodes: 13

Production
- Executive producer: Andy McIntyre
- Producers: Nicole Dixon; Rachel Millar; Michelle Wyatt
- Production locations: Melbourne, Victoria
- Running time: 30 minutes (inc. adverts)
- Production companies: Big Yellow Taxi Productions; Kinne Productions

Original release
- Network: Network 10
- Release: 17 August 2018 – present

Kinne Tonight is an Australian sketch comedy television series created, written and directed by Troy Kinne and Max Price first airing as a pilot, on 17 August 2018 on Network 10. The first season premiered on 27 May 2019.

In October 2019, Kinne Tonight was renewed for a second season which premiered on 25 May 2020 at 9:40 pm.

== Cast ==
- Troy Kinne
- Sarah Bishop
- Max Price
- Genevieve Hegney
- Nicolette Minster
- Oliver Clark
- Josh Lawson
- Anna Hutchison
- Dave Thornton
- Nina Oyama
- Ashlea Renae
- Laura Dunemann
- Elliot Loney
- Ash Williams
- Des Dowling
- Natalie Tran
- Tom Seigert
- Daniel Connell
- Tommy Flanagan
- Bev Killick

== Episodes ==
Series	Episodes	Originally released	
Series	Episodes	First released	Last released
Pilot		17 August 2018	
1	6	27 May 2019	1 July 2019
2	7	25 May 2020	6 July 2020

=== Pilot ===
Celebrities	Guests	Timeslot	Original release date	Australia viewers (millions)
Rob Mills	Natalie Tran, Chris Fortuna, Emma-Louise Wilson	TBA	17 August 2018	N/A

=== Season 1 (2019) ===
No. in season	Celebrities	Guests	Timeslot	Original release date	Australia viewers (millions)
1	Angie Kent	Sarah Bishop, Oliver Clark, Nina Oyama	9.40 pm Monday	27 May 2019	389,000
2	N/A	Nicolette Minster, Nina Oyama, Sarah Bishop, Max Price	9.40 pm Monday	3 June 2019	276,000
3	Nicky Whelan	Dave Thornton & Nina Oyama	10.00 pm Monday	10 June 2019	232,000
4	Ash Williams	Sarah Bishop, Max Price	10.00 pm Monday	17 June 2019	305,000
5	Ash Williams	Daniel Connell & Dave Thornton	9.40 pm Monday	24 June 2019	297,000
6	N/A	Nicolette Minster & Dave Thornton	9.40 pm Monday	1 July 2019	314,000

=== Season 2 (2020) ===
No. in season	Celebrities	Guests	Timeslot	Original release date	Australia viewers (millions)
1	Christie Whelan Browne	Dave Thornton, Natalie Tran, Nina Oyama, Oliver Clark	9.40 pm Monday	25 May 2020	372,000
2	Christie Whelan Browne, Andy Lee & Rob Mills	Nicolette Minster, Dave Thornton, Max Price	9.40 pm Monday	1 June 2020	338,000
3	Christie Whelan Browne, Andy Lee	Nina Oyama, Oliver Clark, Nicolette Minster, Sarah Bishop, Dave Thornton	9.40 pm Monday	8 June 2020	293,000
4	Christie Whelan Browne	Oliver Clark, Max Price, Dave Thornton, Natalie Tran	9.40 pm Monday	15 June 2020	342,000
5	Christie Whelan Browne	Natalie Tran, Elliot Loney, Oliver Clark, Nicolette Minster, Max Price, Dave Thornton	9.40 pm Monday	22 June 2020	322,000
6	Christie Whelan Browne	Natalie Tran, Oliver Clark, Max Price	9.40 pm Monday	29 June 2020	319,000
7	Christie Whelan Browne; Andy Lee	Max Price, Nicolette Minster, Nina Oyama, Dave Thornton, Oliver Clark	9.40 pm Monday	6 July 2020	274,000

== See also ==
- Kinne
