= Together (2025 film) =

2025 film by Michael Shanks

- Theatrical release poster
- Directed by: Michael Shanks
- Written by: Michael Shanks
- Produced by: Dave Franco; Alison Brie; Mike Cowap; Andrew Mittman; Erik Feig; Max Silva; Julia Hammer; Timothy Headington
- Starring: Dave Franco; Alison Brie
- Cinematography: Germain McMicking
- Edited by: Sean Lahiff
- Music by: Cornel Wilczek
- Production companies: Picturestart; Tango Entertainment; 30West; 1.21; Princess Pictures
- Distributed by: Neon (United States); Kismet Movies (Australia)
- Release dates: January 26, 2025 (Sundance); July 30, 2025 (United States); July 31, 2025 (Australia)
- Running time: 102 minutes
- Countries: Australia; United States
- Language: English
- Box office: $34.7 million

Together is a 2025 supernatural body horror film written and directed by Michael Shanks in his feature-length directorial debut. It stars Dave Franco and Alison Brie as a couple who move to the countryside, where they are afflicted with a horrific curse. The film's supernatural element is loosely based on the Greek myth of Hermaphroditus and the fountain of Salmacis.

A co-production between Australia and the United States, Together premiered at Sundance on January 26, 2025, and was released in the United States by Neon on July 30 and in Australia by Kismet Movies on July 31. It received positive reviews from critics and grossed $34 million worldwide.

At the 2026 Screen Music Awards, music by Cornel Wilczek and Alex Olijnyk was nominated for Best Soundtrack Album.

== Plot ==
A man returns home after searching for a missing couple with his two dogs. Later that night, he awakens to the dogs barking and discovers them painfully fused together.

Millie Wilson takes a job teaching elementary school English and moves to the countryside with her longtime boyfriend, aspiring musician Tim Brassington, who has become emotionally distant since his parents' recent deaths. Before the move, Millie proposes to Tim at a farewell party, but he hesitates. After meeting her new coworker Jamie, who tells them about nearby walking trails, Millie and Tim explore the area. During a rainstorm, they fall into an underground cave and decide to spend the night there. Tim drinks from a pool of water, but Millie refuses. The next morning, they find their legs partially stuck together by a gooey substance. After separating, they dismiss it as mildew.

Tim soon begins experiencing inexplicable episodes in which he is physically drawn toward Millie, confusing and frustrating them both. A doctor attributes the incidents to panic attacks and prescribes muscle relaxants, while mentioning that a local couple has recently disappeared. Jamie visits their home and is invited to dinner. The couple recounts their cave experience, and Jamie explains that the cave once housed a New Age church before collapsing. Later, while Millie drops Tim at a train station for a gig, another episode causes him to seek her out at work. After angrily confronting him in a bathroom stall, Millie and Tim have sex and become fused together at the genitals. They painfully separate, but Jamie witnesses the aftermath.

Millie visits Jamie to apologize, and he gives her water. She discusses the problems in her relationship with Tim, prompting Jamie to explain the theory of the nature and origin of eros in Symposium. He urges her not to abandon her "other half" and recalls his relationship with his apparently deceased husband. Millie leaves after seeing a disoriented Tim outside. Using exif data from their social media photos, Tim discovers that the missing couple had also visited the cave.

That night, Tim and Millie are supernaturally drawn together until their arms fuse. They take Tim's pills, which temporarily reverse the fusion, and pass out. Tim later awakens tied to a chair while Millie saws through their fused limb. She decides to take them to a hospital but realizes she left her keys at Jamie's house. Tim returns to the cave and finds the missing couple fused into a grotesque hybrid. Meanwhile, Millie enters Jamie's house and discovers a wedding tape revealing that Jamie is actually one of two married men fused together through the church. Jamie claims they are happier after "becoming whole" and urges Millie to complete her fusion with Tim. When Jamie cuts her arm, Millie flees.

Millie reunites with Tim at home and tells him about the fused couple. Tim concludes that their grotesque form resulted from resisting the fusion and prepares to slit his throat to spare Millie. When Millie nearly bleeds to death, Tim fuses his arm to her wound, saving her. Accepting their fate, they affirm their love and embrace as they fuse into a single being. That weekend, Millie's parents arrive and are greeted by the now-fused Millie and Tim as one androgynous person.

== Cast ==
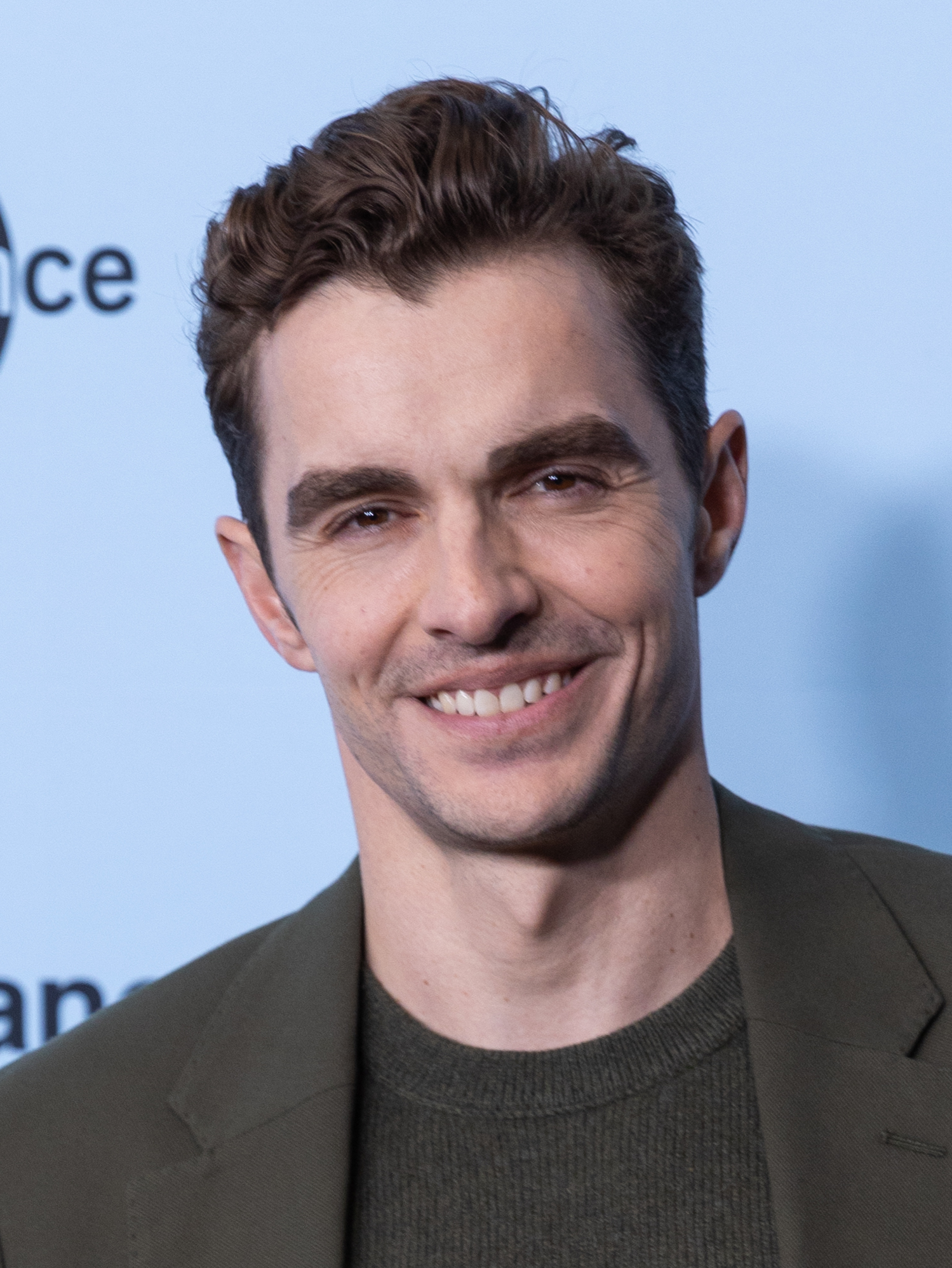
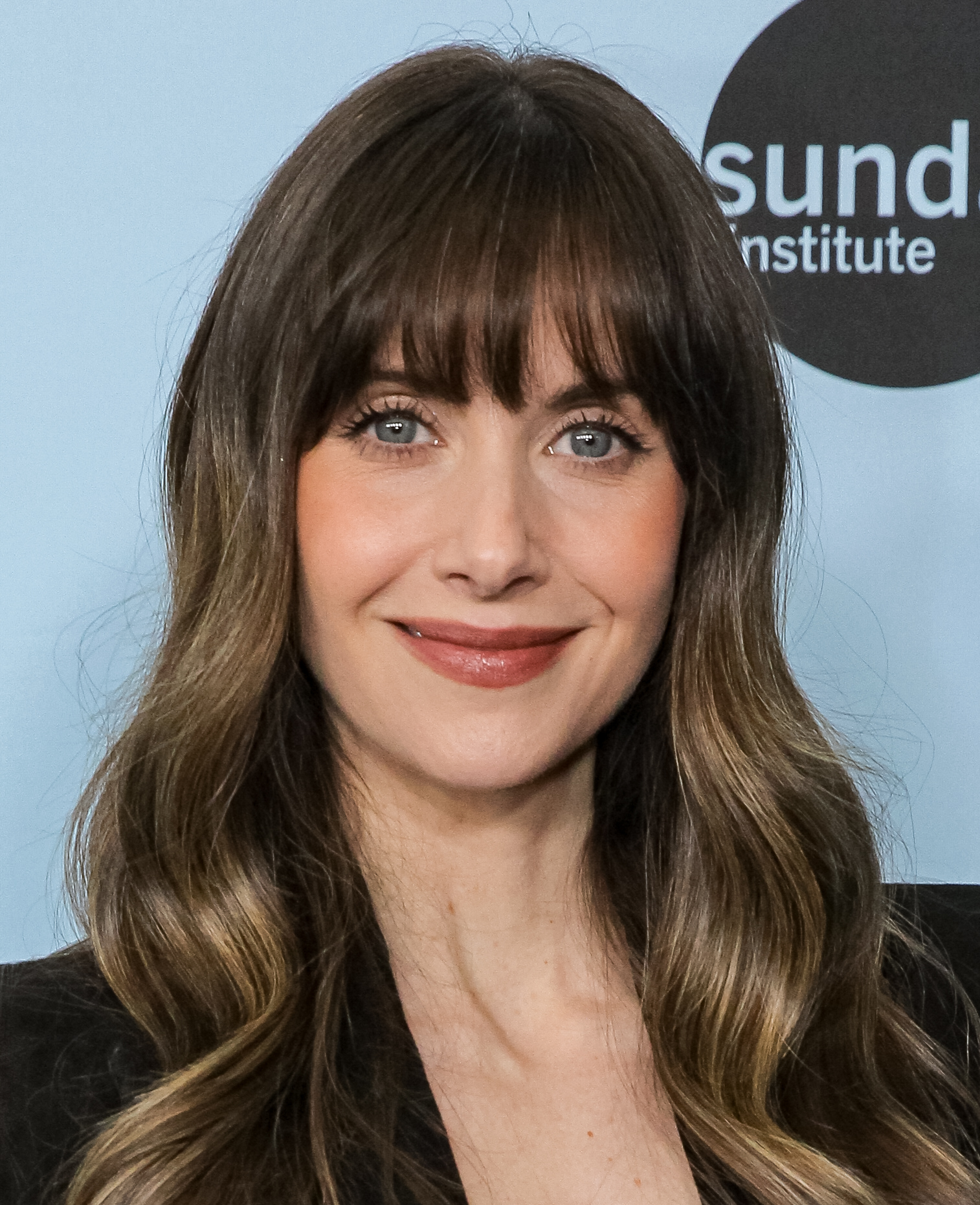
Dave Franco and Alison Brie were cast in leading roles.
- Dave Franco as Tim Brassington
- Alison Brie as Millie Wilson
  - Brie also briefly portrays the merged Tim and Millie, nicknamed "Tillie", with Franco's features added via prosthetics and motion capture.
- Damon Herriman as Jamie McCabe
  - Charlie Lees as Groom 1
  - MJ Dorning as Groom 2
- Mia Morrissey as Cath
- Karl Richmond as Jordy
- Jack Kenny as Luke
- Francesca Waters as Carol
- Aljin Abella as Dr. Mendoza
- Sarah Lang as Keri Gilligan
- Rob Brown as Chaplain
- Ellora Iris as Anna
- Tom Considine as Millie's father
- Melanie Beddie as Millie's mother
- Flynn Wandin as a Student
- Nancy Finn as Tim's mother
- Mark Robinson as Tim's father
- Michael Shanks as Simon
- Sunny S. Walia as a Farmer

== Production ==
=== Development and casting ===
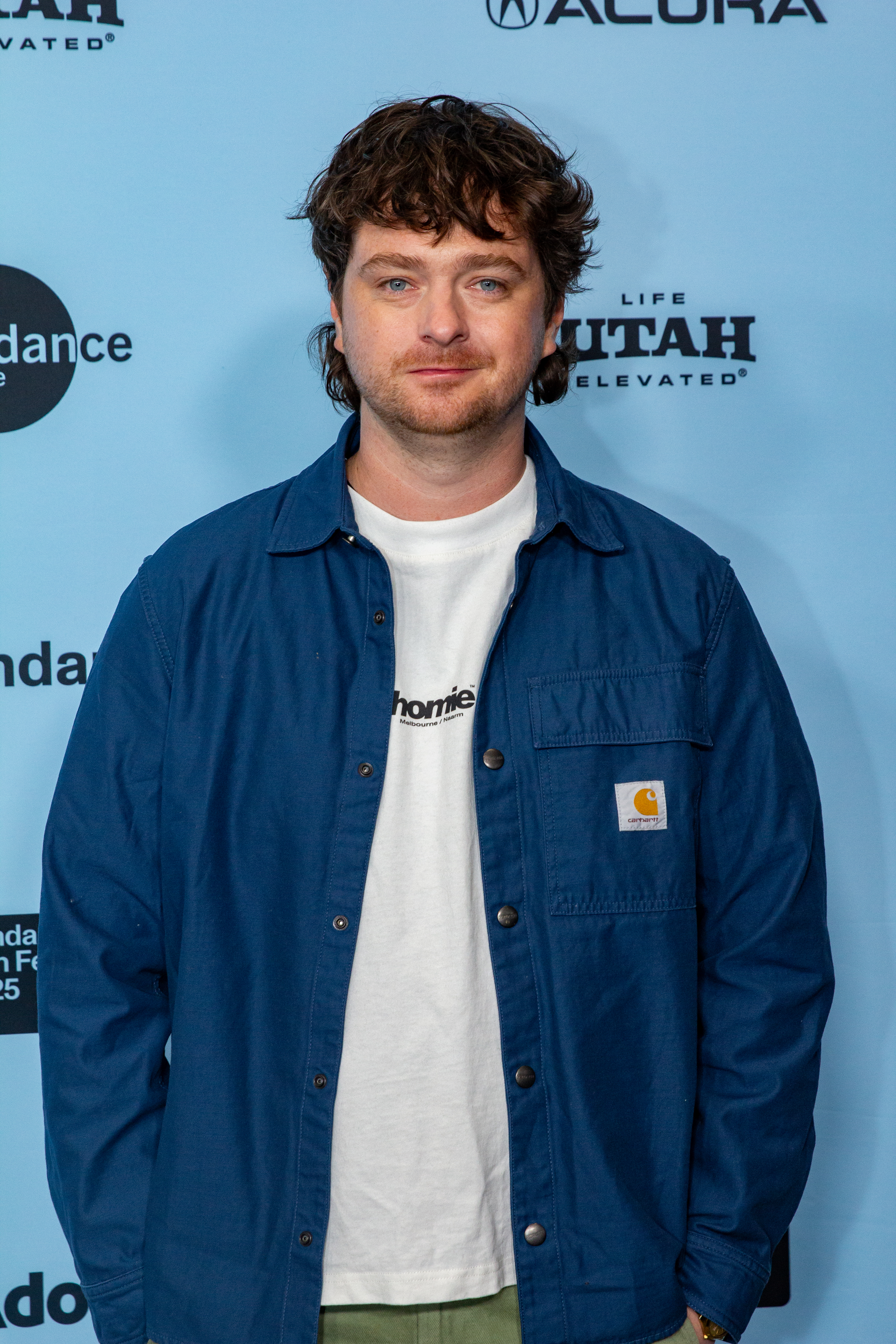
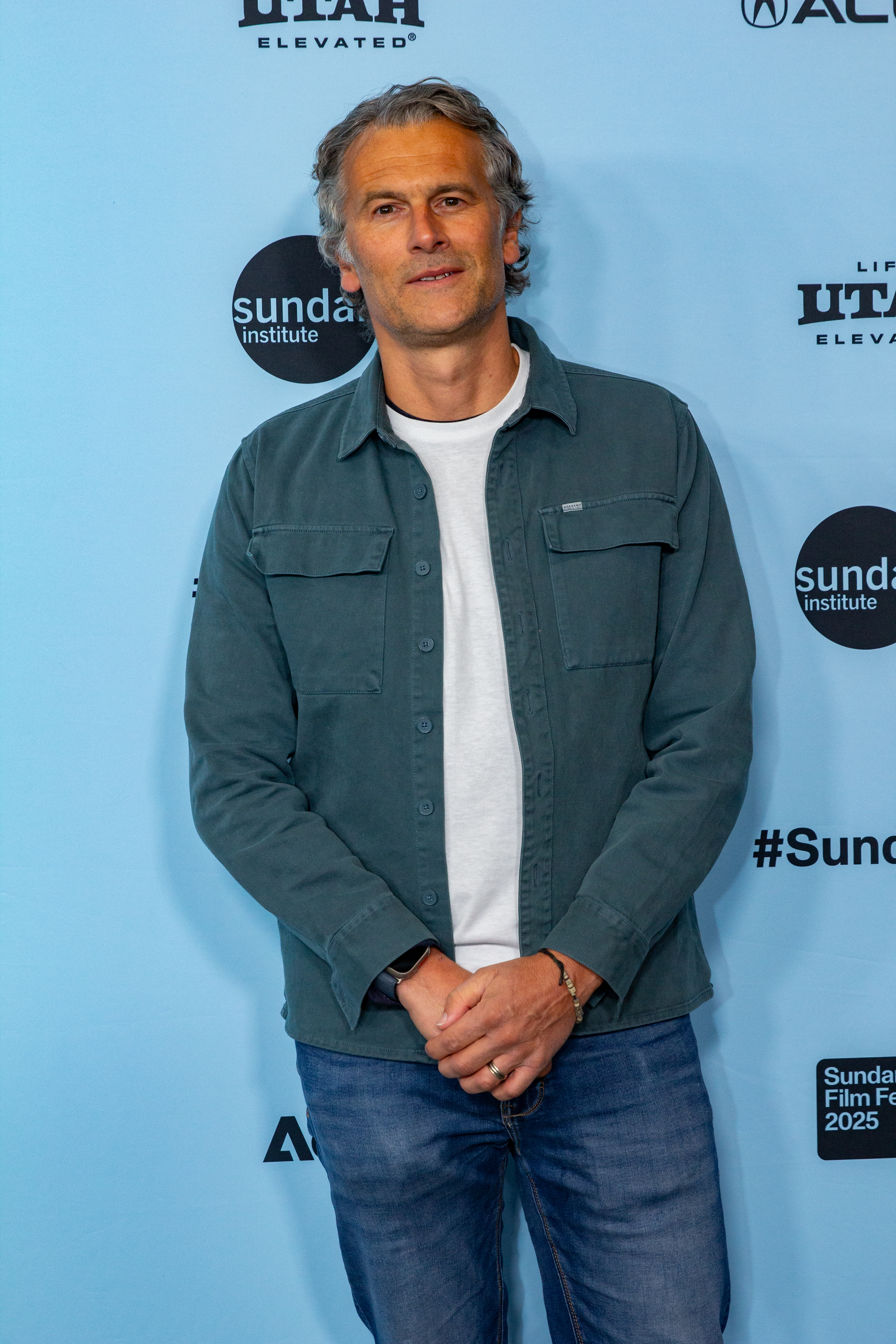
Writer/director Michael Shanks (left) and producer Mike Cowap

In February 2024, Dave Franco and Alison Brie joined the cast of the film, with Michael Shanks directing from a screenplay he wrote. 30West, Tango Entertainment and Picturestart produced and financed the film.

=== Filming ===
Though the film is set in Washington state, principal photography took place in Melbourne, Victoria, Australia. The film was shot in 21 days. Shanks's partner, who worked for a sex toy company, supplied free lifelike prop genitalia for use in a scene in which Brie and Franco's genitalia are stuck together. For a section of the movie Brie and Franco wore a prosthetic that effectively conjoined their arms together for hours on end, resulting in the couple having to use the restroom together.

The conjoining effects involved both prosthetics built by designer Larry Van Duynhoven and computer-generated imagery provided by Framestore. To create the merged version of Tim and Millie who the crew nicknamed "Tillie", effects supervisor Genevieve Camilleri did composites of Brie and Franco on Nuke to unveil a face that could be identified as an amalgam of the couple. With that as reference, Brie was filmed wearing a wig, a make-up recreation of Franco's eyebrows, and brown contacts. Afterwards Franco with motion tracking dots in his face was filmed on the same location, and his jaw and lips were digitally composited onto Brie's face.

== Music ==
The film score was conceived by Australian composer Cornel Wilczek, and was released on August 1, 2025, through Lakeshore Records. In an interview, Wilczek explained that the score is "built around their romance" while further stating, "If you strip it all back, the main theme is basically a soppy love song. That became the raw material I bent, stretched, distorted, and reshaped throughout the film—mirroring those physical transformations. You've got elements courting each other, circling, slowly converging. There's a playfulness, but also tension and release. The music evolves alongside them." Additional songs featured in the film include "2 Become 1" by Spice Girls, "Another One" by Golden Suits, and "Happy Together" by The Turtles.

=== Track listing ===
No.	Title	Length
1.	"The Missing Hikers"	2:46
2.	"Rat King"	1:33
3.	"The Ultimate Intimacy in Divine Flesh"	2:37
4.	"Mildew or Something?"	2:01
5.	"A Fucking Three-Legged-Race"	2:06
6.	"Dumb City-Folk Who Went Against Nature and Lost"	3:23
7.	"A Great Thirst"	1:51
8.	"23 Likes"	1:50
9.	"Together with Tim"	0:56
10.	"Thirsty All Over, A Love Song"	1:58
11.	"It Was Like a Window Opened Between Our House and That Night"	1:05
12.	"The Beginning of Something Wonderful!"	2:57
13.	"It Feels...Crowded"	1:52
14.	"I JUST SAW'D THROUGH OUR FUCKING ARMS!"	3:12
15.	"MUSCLE RELAXANT!"	3:43
16.	"By the Way, I'm Sorry I Didn't Believe You, You Were Right, Obviously"	1:54
17.	"Together with Millie"	1:51
18.	"Our First Dance"	2:03
Total length:		39:38

== Release ==
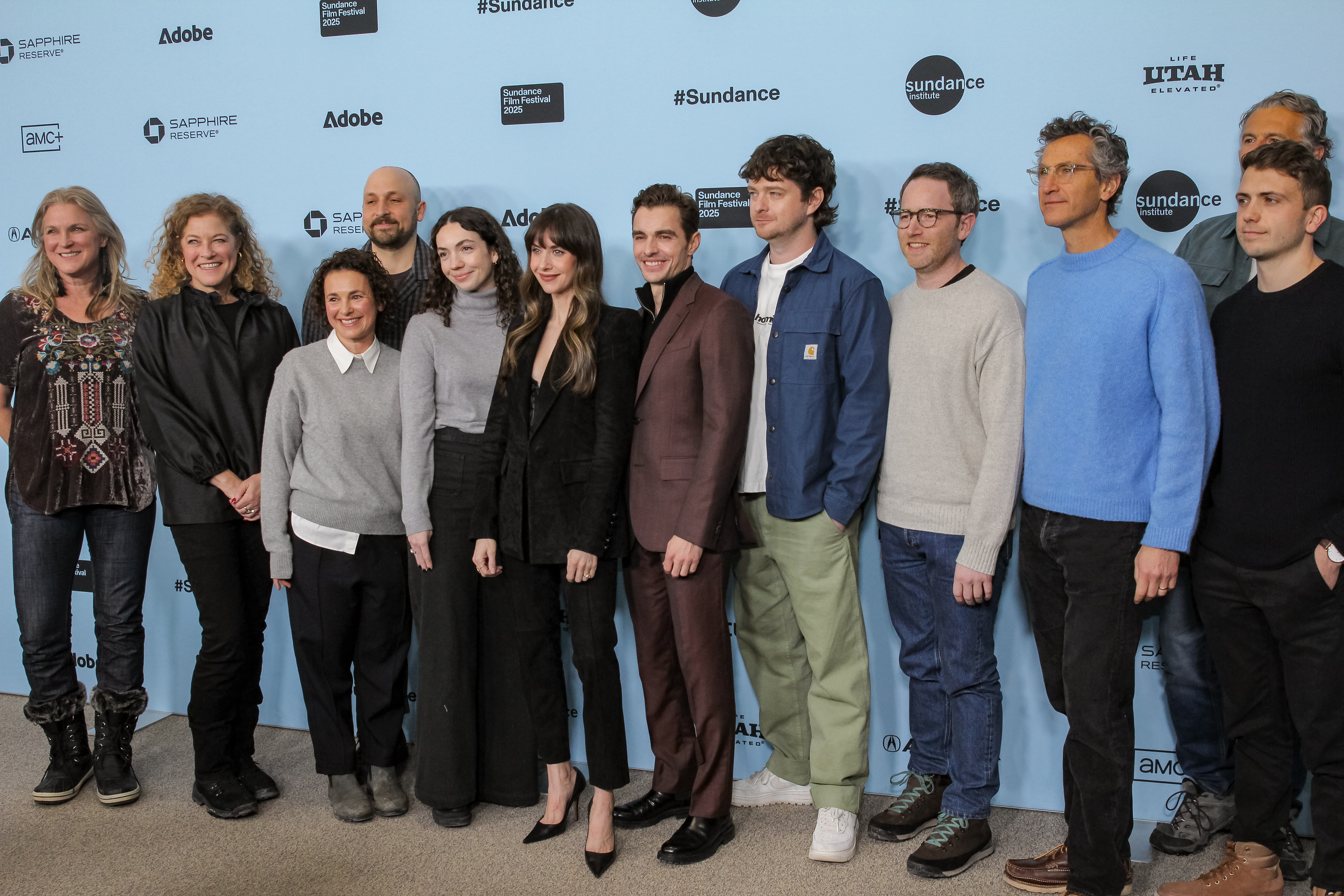
The cast and crew of Together at the 2025 Sundance Film Festival

The film premiered in the Midnight section of the 2025 Sundance Film Festival on January 26, 2025. Positive word-of-mouth following its premiere sparked much interest among companies including A24, Neon, Apple TV+, Focus Features, Searchlight Pictures, Mubi, and Amazon MGM Studios. Neon subsequently acquired worldwide distribution rights to the film for $17 million, the first major sale at the 2025 Sundance Film Festival. It had its international premiere on the opening night of the Sydney Film Festival on June 4, 2025, also screening in the Official Competition section of the festival on June 7 and 8.

Together was scheduled for a theatrical release in the United States on August 1, 2025. It was later moved up by two days to release on July 30. The film was released in Australia by Kismet Movies on July 31.

Together had advance screenings in China on September 12, where it was observed that the film had been digitally altered by authorities, making a same-sex couple was changed to look like a heterosexual one. The film was scheduled for general release in China on September 19, but had not yet been released by September 25.

=== Home media ===
Together was released on digital platforms on August 26, 2025.

== Reception ==
=== Box office ===
As of September 11, 2025, Together has grossed $21 million in the United States and Canada, and $11 million in other territories, for a worldwide total of $32 million.

In the United States and Canada, Together was released alongside The Bad Guys 2 and The Naked Gun, and was projected to gross $7.5–10 million in its opening weekend. It went on to debut to $10.9 million, finishing sixth at the box office.

=== Critical response ===
On the review aggregator website Rotten Tomatoes, 89% of 246 critics' reviews are positive, with an average rating of 7.2/10. The website's consensus reads: "Given an extra sinew of authenticity by the metatextual casting of Alison Brie and Dave Franco at the top of their game, Together is a body horror that's as emotionally sticky as it is memorably gnarly." Metacritic, which uses a weighted average, assigned the film a score of 75 out of 100, based on 39 critics, indicating "generally favorable" reviews. Audiences polled by CinemaScore gave the film an average grade of "C+" on an A+ to F scale.

The Globe and Mail's Barry Hertz gave a positive review and wrote, "It is the most potent fusion of the pair's private and public lives any curious fan could possibly hope for. Oh, and it is exceptionally, wildly disgusting." Brianna Zigler of The A.V. Club gave the film a B grade, and wrote, "The profound depth of feeling generated by Brie and Franco in the midst of this genre film, one perhaps unattainable if they weren't also married in real life, gives Together a real shot as the greatest romance of the year, even if it's also a film that happens to feature a motorized, saw-toothed blade slicing through mutated flesh. It takes more than gore to undermine the sensation of being so in love with someone that you want to get inside their skin." Amy Nicholson of Los Angeles Times wrote that "Nothing about Together screams comedy, yet that's precisely how it's put together."

The Wall Street Journal's Zachary Barnes gave a less positive review, stating, "Together is less a fully conceived horror movie than a plodding relationship drama with some impressively disgusting effects superimposed on it."

=== Chinese version ===
The Chinese version of the film, which was digitally altered to make a same-sex couple a heterosexual one, was negatively received by viewers in China, who criticised the change as being disrespectful to the LGBTQ+ community. Sex scenes were also censored in the Chinese version.

=== Accolades ===
Award	Date of ceremony	Category	Recipient(s)	Result	Ref.
SXSW	March 15, 2025	Festival Favorite	Together	Nominated	
Sydney Film Festival	June 15, 2025	Best Film	Together	Nominated	
Locarno Film Festival	August 16, 2025	Prix du public	Together	Nominated	
Sitges Film Festival	October 19, 2025	Best Feature Film	Together	Nominated	
Astra Film Awards	January 9, 2026	Best Horror or Thriller Feature	Together	Nominated	
Astra Film Awards	January 9, 2026	Best Performance in a Horror or Thriller	Alison Brie	Nominated	
AACTA Awards	February 6, 2026	Best Screenplay	Michael Shanks	Nominated	
AACTA Awards	February 6, 2026	Best Lead Actress	Alison Brie	Nominated	
AACTA Awards	February 6, 2026	Best Supporting Actor	Damon Herriman	Nominated	
AACTA Awards	February 6, 2026	Best Editing	Sean Lahiff	Nominated	
AACTA Awards	February 6, 2026	Best Original Music Score	Cornel Wilczek	Nominated	
AACTA Awards	February 6, 2026	Best Sound	Paul Pirola, Matt Lapthorne	Nominated	
AACTA Awards	February 6, 2026	Best Production Design	Sherree Philips	Nominated	
AACTA Awards	February 6, 2026	Best Hair and Makeup	Larry Van Duynhoven, Ellie Daniel, Brydie Stone, Julian Dimase	Nominated	
AWGIE Awards	February 19, 2026	Feature Film – Original Screenplay	Michael Shanks	Nominated	
Visual Effects Society Awards	February 25, 2026	Outstanding Effects Simulations in a Photoreal Feature	Darcy George, Andrew Dunkerley, Ray Leung, Steve Oakley	Nominated	
Critics' Choice Super Awards	August 6, 2026	Best Actress in a Horror Movie	Alison Brie	Nominated	

== Plagiarism lawsuit ==
In May 2025, Shanks, Brie, Franco, the talent agency Endeavor, and Neon were sued in a lawsuit alleging copyright infringement on the 2023 film Better Half by writer-director Patrick Henry Phelan; their production company StudioFest was the plaintiff in the suit. According to the filing, Better Half was pitched to Brie and Franco in August 2020, who rejected an offer to star because they wanted to produce it themselves and have William Morris Endeavor hire a writer for the material; claims on supposed similarities between the two films were also made. Shanks denied the allegations, stating that he wrote and registered the first draft of his screenplay to the Writers Guild of America in 2019, received development funding from Screen Australia in 2020, and that his agent pitched Franco with his script.
