= Emma Holland =

Australian comedian

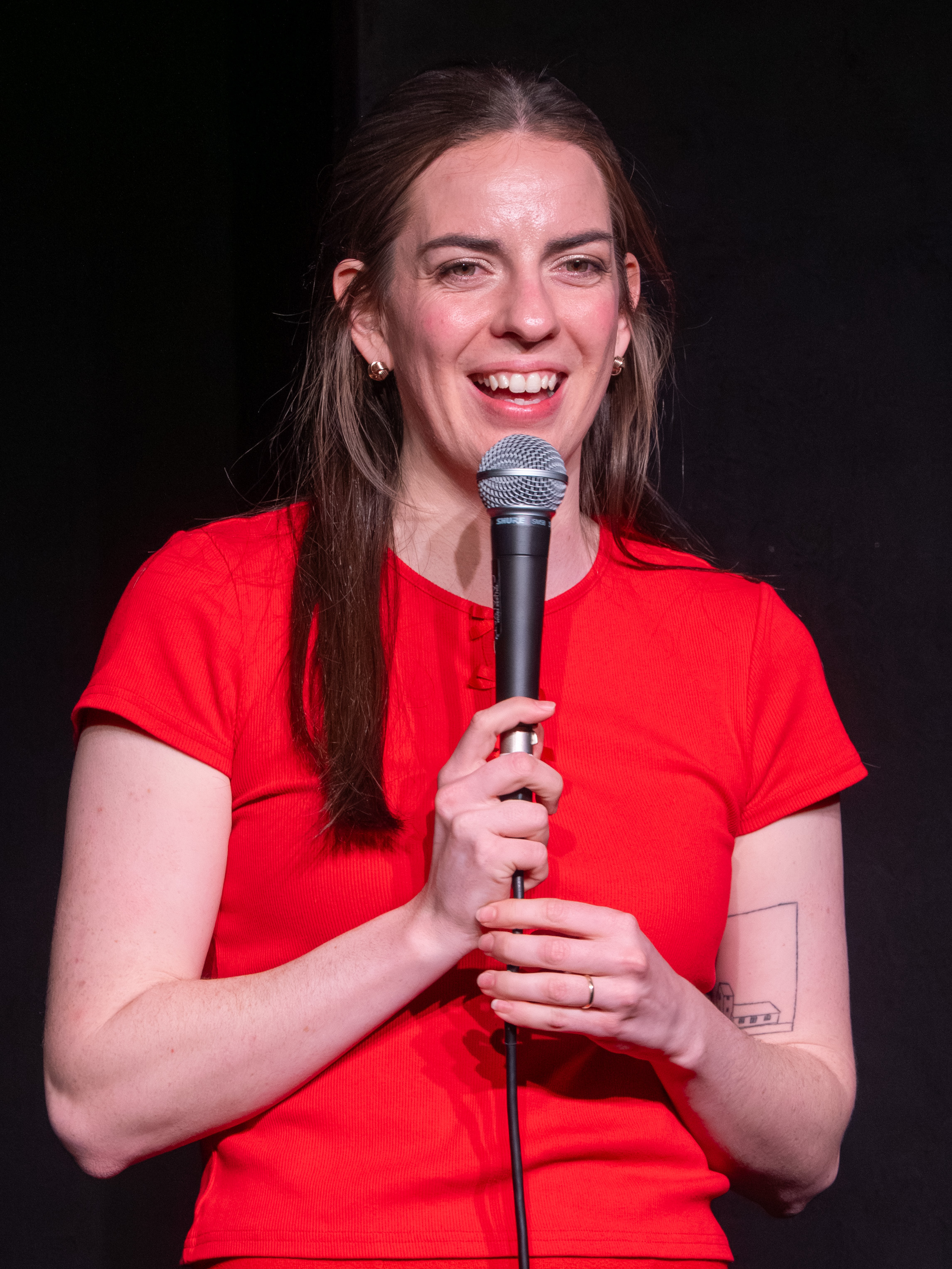
- Holland at the 2025 Edinburgh Festival Fringe
- Born: 1995 or 1996; Sale, Victoria, Australia
- Education: Australian National University (2016)
- Occupations: Comedian; writer; collage artist; photographer
- Years active: 2018–present

Emma Holland is an Australian comedian, artist, and writer.

== Life ==
Holland was born in Sale, Gippsland, Victoria and grew up in Bandung, Indonesia and Canberra, Australia. She graduated in 2016 from the Australian National University with a degree in art.

In 2018, Holland was a runner-up in the Raw Comedy National Grand Final. The next year, Holland debuted her first solo show, Dolly Doctor Strangelove, at the Canberra Comedy Festival. In 2020, Holland performed in Canberra with her show Fine Art.

She presented her stand-up show Dreamer in the Mist at the 2022 Melbourne International Comedy Festival (MICF), and in 2023, Holland's show Save The Orangutans was nominated for outstanding show at the festival. Holland performed her solo show Here Comes Mr. Forehead at the 2024 MICF, as well as Emma's Debutante with Frankie McNair. She also travelled to and performed at Edinburgh Fringe in 2024, with a show about growing up in Indonesia.

Holland has also appeared on and written for various television shows, including The Cheap Seats (where she has often been a fill-in co-host), Have You Been Paying Attention?, 7 Days, and Thank God You're Here. Her show Fine Art was also commissioned for television in 2024 by the ABC as part of its Fresh Blood 3 initiative. In 2025, she appeared as a contestant on and was the winner of the fourth season of Taskmaster Australia.

As of 2025, Holland is represented by Jubilee Street Management.

In 2025, Holland released her debut stand-up special Here Comes Mr. Forehead.

Don't Touch My Trinkets, a five-city Australian comedy festival stand-up tour began in February 2025. In 2025 she appeared as a contestant on Claire Hooper's House of Games.
