= Brett Blake =

Australian comedian

- Born: 1986 or 1987 (age 39–40); Western Australia, Australia
- Occupation: Comedian

Brett Blake (born 1986 or 1987) is an Australian comedian.

== Career ==
Blake presented Bogan Genius in 2019; it was released on Paramount+ in 2022.

Blake performed his show Go Hard or Go Home at the Melbourne International Comedy Festival (MICF) in 2021, and took part in the MICF roadshow in 2022.

He performed at the Geelong Comedy Festival 2024.

Blake presented his show Little Turd, based on his legal troubles as a teenager, at the MICF in 2025, where it ran for more than 20 nights and was shortlisted for Most Outstanding Show. He also performed the show at the Brisbane Comedy Festival and, retitled as Little Scallywag, at Assembly George Square during Edinburgh Festival Fringe.

He has appeared on a variety of panel and quiz shows, including 7 Days, Patriot Brains, Question Everything, and Tonight at the Museum. Blake competed in series 5 of Taskmaster Australia. He also acted in the show The Tourist.

Blake co-hosts the podcast Work Hates with Bron Lewis.

== Personal life ==
Blake was raised in Forrestfield, a suburb of Kalamunda, Western Australia; his father is a miner and his mother is a special education teacher.

When Blake was 17, in 2004, he and some friends went to a large house party that was later raided by police. After a police officer hit a friend of Blake's with a riot shield, Blake threw a brick at the officer; he was arrested and charged with disorderly conduct, inciting a riot, and assaulting a police officer. He appeared in the Children's Court of Western Australia and was ultimately released with no fines or jail time.

Blake has ADHD and dyslexia.
