= Natalie Tran =

Australian YouTuber and actress (born 1986)

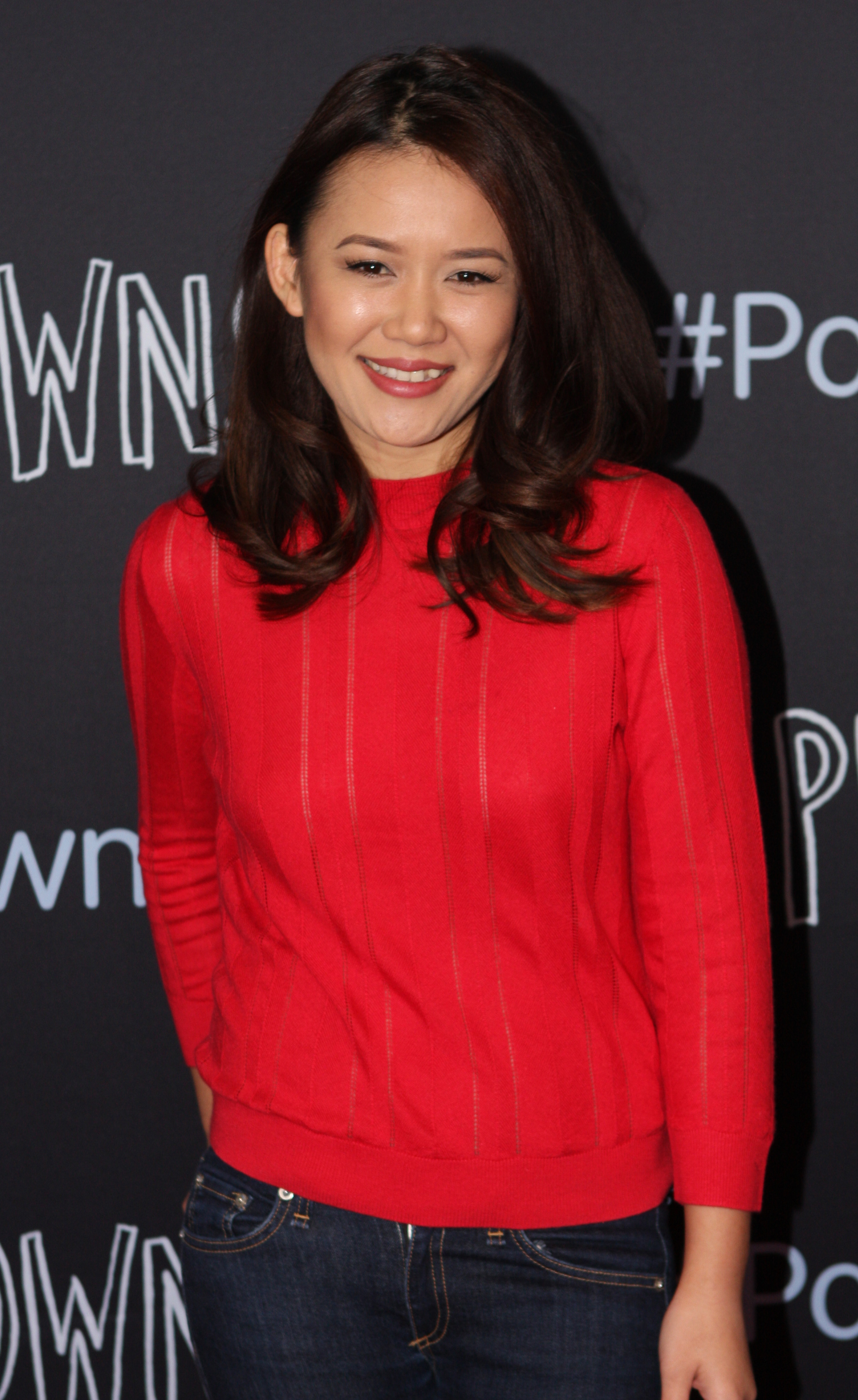
- Tran at the Australian premiere of Paper Towns in 2015
- Born: 24 July 1986 (age 40); Sydney, New South Wales, Australia
- Education: University of New South Wales
- Occupations: Comedian; actress; television presenter; YouTuber
- Years active: 2006–present

YouTube information
- Channel: communitychannel
- Genres: Comedy; satire; vlog
- Subscribers: 1.76 million
- Views: 177 million
- Last updated: 23 April 2026

Natalie Tran (born 24 July 1986), also known online as communitychannel, is an Australian comedian, actress, television presenter, and former YouTuber. She became known on YouTube for her comedy videos, in which she discusses everyday issues.

Tran began posting on YouTube in 2006 while attending University of New South Wales. From 2006 to 2016, her channel consisted primarily of observational comedy videos with monologues. Tran was the most subscribed-to YouTuber in Australia and one of the highest-earning YouTubers globally in the late 2000s and early 2010s. She ceased uploading routinely to YouTube in late 2016.

Since 2023, Tran has hosted the television baking competition The Great Australian Bake Off. She had recurring roles on the sketch comedy series The Slot (2017–2018) and Kinne Tonight (2018–2020) and on the FX/Foxtel comedy-crime drama series Mr Inbetween (2018–2021) as Jacinta. She also had a supporting role in the romantic comedy film Goddess (2013).

== Early life and education ==
Natalie Tran was born on 24 July 1986 in the suburb of Auburn in Sydney, New South Wales, Australia, to refugee parents who travelled to Australia from Vietnam in 1981. Her mother previously practised law, while her father practised literary lecturing. Her sister, Isabel, travelled with Tran's parents from Vietnam. She has stated that her parents "fled Vietnam with nothing but the clothes on their backs". After the family resettled in Sydney, Tran's mother found employment in the postal service, while her father became a public school teacher.

Tran was raised in Auburn, and went to primary school in Lidcombe. She then attended Rosebank College in Five Dock, before transferring in Year 9 to Meriden School, an Anglican all-girls school in Strathfield, where she graduated in 2004. Speaking about her secondary school experience, she shared that she "wasn't really a fan", saying, "I'm not a very ambitious or very applied student." After high school, she attended the University of New South Wales, where she originally majored in education after being inspired by her father, but, following the success of her YouTube channel, began studying and later completing a degree in Digital Media. While attending the University of New South Wales, she worked in retail.

== Career ==
=== YouTube ===
Tran posted her first video to YouTube on September 25, 2006, initially posting responses to other videos she had seen on the site. Her content then consisted of observational comedy skits and vlogs, which lampooned everyday situations—such as losing her phone on silent mode, not being able to keep house plants from dying, and envisioning the person who measures celebrities' heights—in which she played all of the characters and gave monologues throughout.

In 2007, Tran was invited to participate in the launch of YouTube Australia. A video of her defending Vegemite was featured on the Australian television programme A Current Affair in February 2007. Tran was nominated for two awards for Best YouTube Channel or Personality and for Funniest YouTube Channel at Mashable's 2009 Open Web Awards. Tran partnered with Lonely Planet in 2010 to make a series of travel videos, chronicling her journey around the world to places such as Paris, New York City, Los Angeles and Buenos Aires.

By 2009, Tran was the most subscribed-to YouTuber in Australia and the 37th most subscribed-to globally. In 2010, she became the 18th most subscribed-to YouTuber globally. Also in 2010, Tran was the 10th highest-earning YouTuber on the platform, having made over $101,000 in advertising revenue between July 2009 to July 2010, according to TubeMogul. By 2011, she had earned over one million subscribers. In 2013, she started a relationship advice series called Love Conundrums on her YouTube channel, which she later discontinued. She was included in the lineup at YouTube FanFest Australia 2015. In an April 2015 presentation at Brown University posted to her YouTube channel, she talked about Asian representation and stereotypes in the media. In December 2015, she appeared in Lilly Singh's promotional video for her #GirlLove campaign, which aimed to end socialised competition among women, alongside Shay Mitchell, Hannah Hart, and others.

Her April 2016 parody of Johnny Depp and Amber Heard's video apology for breaking Australian biosecurity laws, in which she depicts them as being held at gunpoint while filming the video, received praise from critics. By September 2016, her channel had an average of 1.43 million views per video, and a ten-year anniversary video for her channel posted that same month featured YouTubers such as The Fine Bros congratulating her. She became an ambassador for YouTube's Creators for Change initiative in September 2016. In December 2017, as part of the program, she released White Male Asian Female, a 40-minute documentary about negative perceptions of relationships between Asian women and Caucasian men such as her own, on her YouTube channel.

Tran stopped posting to YouTube regularly in December 2016, which she stated in 2019 was due to anxiety from her obsessive–compulsive disorder. In February 2017, her Valentine's Day video, in which she serenaded her partner while he played video games using a virtual reality headset, also gained traction online. She hosted a video guide segment for the 2019 Sydney Film Festival called the Launch Show, released in May 2019.

=== Television and film ===
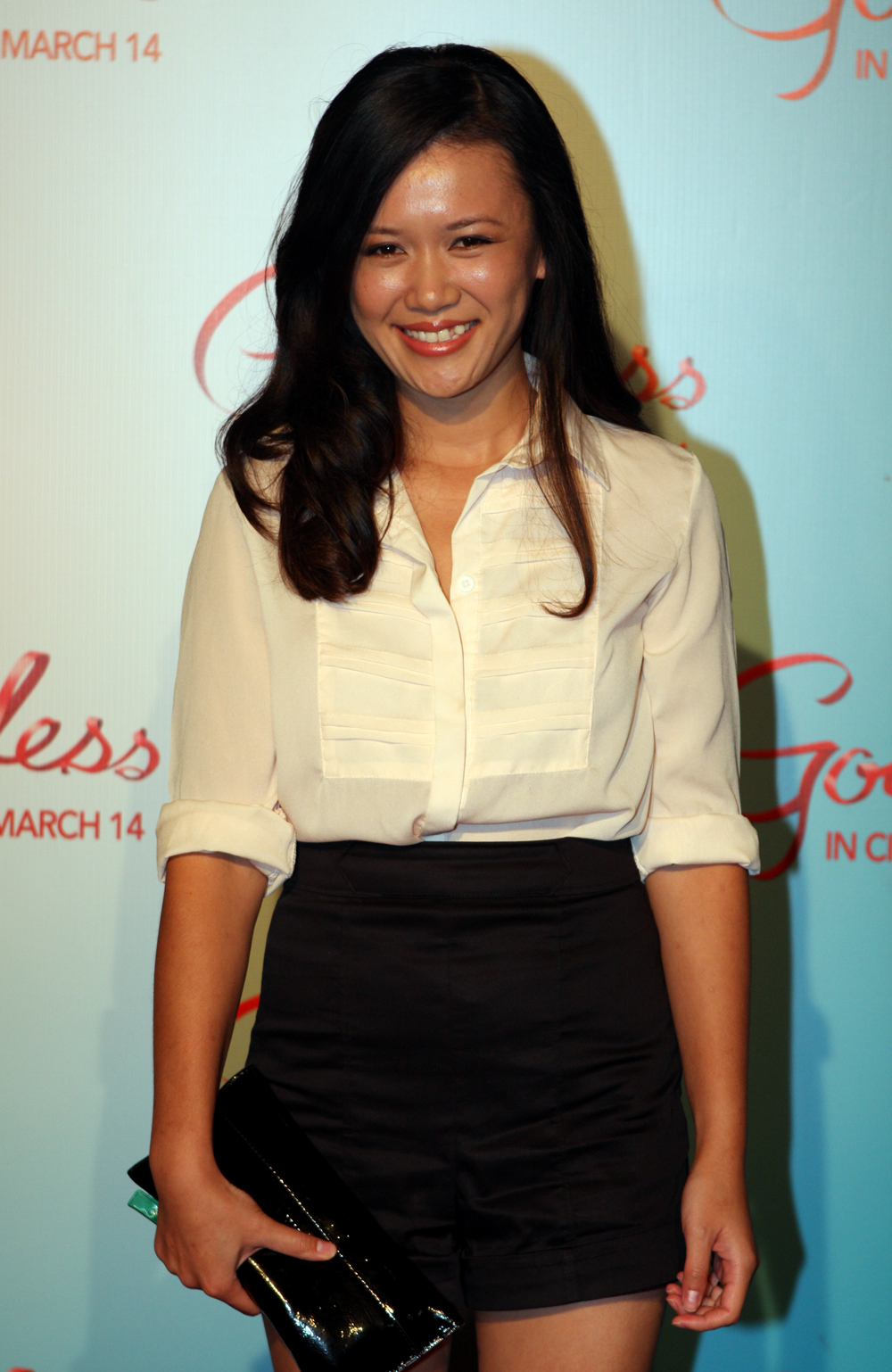
Tran at the premiere of Goddess in 2013

From 2010 to 2011, Tran worked as a Sydney correspondent for The Project's The Whip segment. She made her debut film appearance in the 2013 romantic comedy film Goddess as Helen. From 2017 to 2018, she appeared as a series regular on the sketch comedy show The Slot. She appeared in all three seasons of the FX series Mr Inbetween in the recurring role of Jacinta, the ex-wife of the protagonist, Ray, played by series creator Scott Ryan. She appeared as a guest in the pilot episode of the sketch comedy series Kinne Tonight in August 2018. In 2020, she returned to the show during its second season as a recurring guest.

Tran was a correspondent and writer for The Weekly with Charlie Pickering in 2021. She made a guest appearance on the Netflix series Heartbreak High in 2022 and had voice roles as Lulu Liu and Kevin's neighbour in the Michael Cusack–helmed animated sitcom Koala Man.

Tran began cohosting the cooking competition television series The Great Australian Bake Off with comedian Cal Wilson in its seventh season, which premiered in June 2023. Wilson and Tran replaced the show's previous hosts, Claire Hooper and Mel Buttle. Mediaweek's Tom Gosby described her hosting performance in season seven as "well-received", while Christine Estera of News.com.au called her a "fan favorite". Following Wilson's death from cancer in October 2023, Tran hosted the show solo until comedian Tom Walker joined Tran as the show's co-host in its ninth season, which premiered in September 2025.

=== Other endeavors ===
Six months after returning home from her Lonely Planet trip in 2011, Tran co-launched a travel app for the Australian Department of Foreign Affairs and Trade with the country's former Foreign Minister Kevin Rudd. By September 2016, she and her partner filmed corporate events for work.

== Public image ==
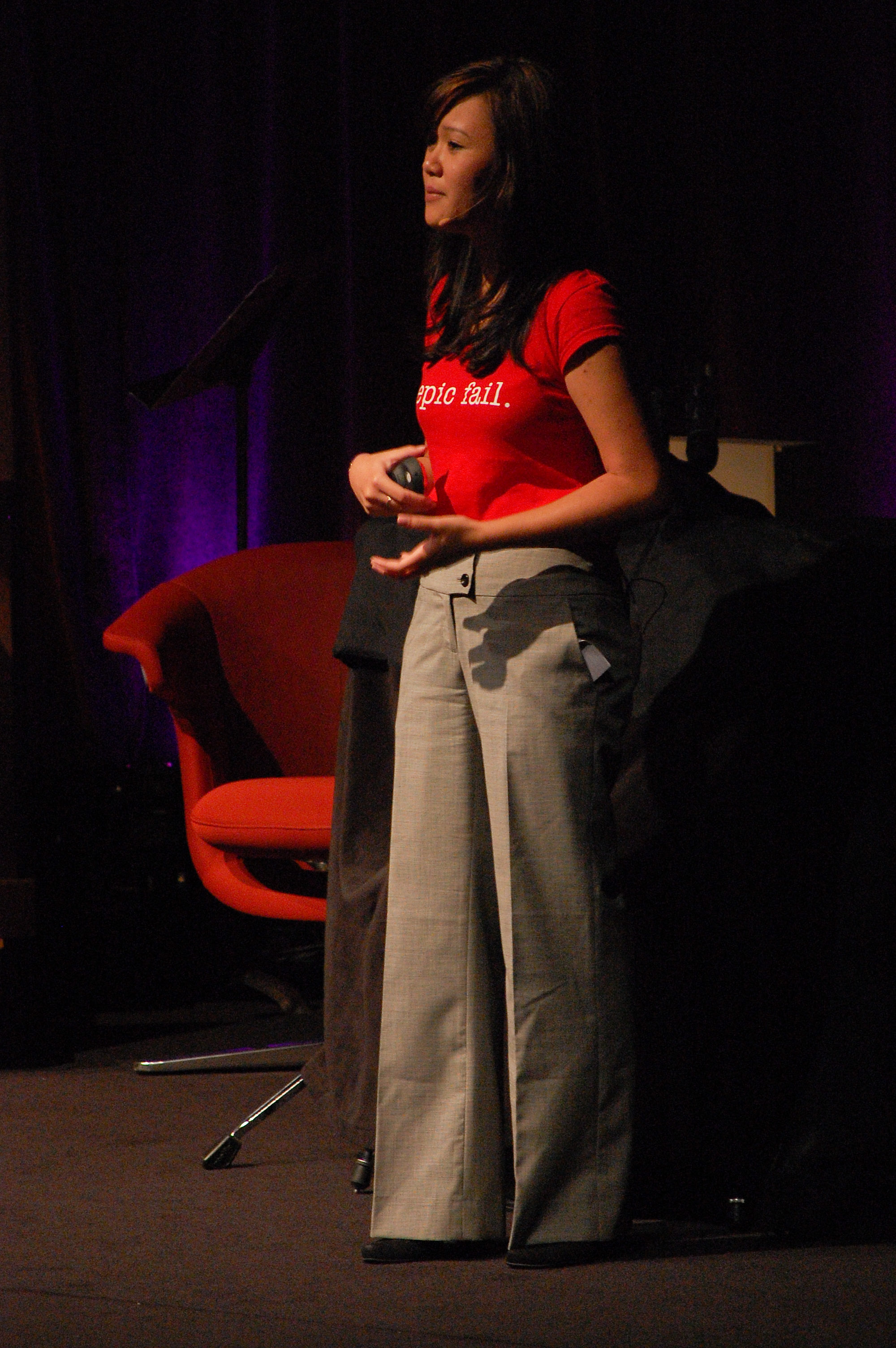
Tran speaking at the EG Conference in 2010

Tran has frequently been referred to in the media as the "Australian Queen of YouTube". She has appeared on multiple lists of the best Australian YouTubers. The Daily Telegraph called her "one of Australia’s original success stories on YouTube". Wired placed Tran on their list of "The Top 10 Geeks from Downunder". In 2011, Tran was included in The Sydney Morning Herald's annual list of Sydney's 100 most influential people. In 2014, Tran was listed on NewMediaRockstars's list of their top 100 YouTube channels. Digital Trends named her video "Indoor Plant Serial Killer" as one of the funniest YouTube videos of all time in 2020.

In 2016, Sam Gutelle of Tubefilter called Tran "one of the original innovators of a video format that is now widespread in the YouTube community". In 2025, Robert Lloyd of the Los Angeles Times called her a "brilliant Australian internet humorist" whose videos were "timeless, smart and funny across years, generations, continents and hemispheres".

== Personal life ==
Tran became vegetarian in 2015, and later became vegan. In 2011, she began dating Rowan Jones, a producer whom she met during her time on The Project. In 2015, the two worked together as freelance videographers. She is an atheist.

== Filmography ==
=== Television ===
Year	Title	Role	Notes
2010–2011	The Project	Herself/Correspondent	13 episodes
2011	Talkin' 'Bout Your Generation	Herself	1 episode
2017–2018	The Slot	Herself	
2018–2021	Mr Inbetween	Jacinta	9 episodes
2018–2020	Kinne Tonight	Herself/Various roles	7 episodes; also writer
2019	Content	Herself	Episode: "Verified - F**k Beauty Gurus"
2020	Rosehaven	Gemma	Episode: "Episode #4.4"
2021	The Weekly with Charlie Pickering	Herself/Correspondent	2 episodes; also writer
2022	Heartbreak High	Rhea Brown	Episode: "Angeline"
2022	Significant Others	Lorrie	2 episodes
2023	Koala Man	Lulu Liu/Kevin's neighbour	Voice role; 2 episodes
2023–present	The Great Australian Bake Off	Herself/Host	Seasons 7–9

=== Film ===
Year	Title	Role	Notes
2013	Goddess	Helen	
2017	White Male Asian Female	Herself	Documentary; also director and narrator

== Awards and nominations ==
Year	Organization	Award	Nominated work	Result
2009	Open Web Awards	Best YouTube Channel or Personality	commmunitychannel	Nominated
2009	Open Web Awards	Funniest YouTube Channel	commmunitychannel	Nominated
2019	The Equity Ensemble Awards	Outstanding Performance by an Ensemble Series in a Drama Series	Mr. Inbetween	Nominated
2024	AACTA Awards	Best Comedy Performer	The Great Australian Bake Off	Nominated
2024	AACTA Awards	Best Lifestyle Program	The Great Australian Bake Off	Nominated
2025	AACTA Awards	Best Reality Series	The Great Australian Bake Off	Nominated
2026	AACTA Awards	Best Reality Series	The Great Australian Bake Off	Won
