= The Slot (TV series) =

- Created by: Theodore Saidden; Nathan Saidden
- Written by: Theodore Saidden; Nathan Saidden
- Country of origin: Australia
- No. of seasons: 2
- No. of episodes: 10

Production
- Producer: Paul Walton

Original release
- Network: The Comedy Channel

The Slot is an Australian sketch comedy series produced for The Comedy Channel. This ten-part series features a new generation of comedy talent, first discovered on YouTube.

== Cast ==
- Sarah Bishop
- Jay K. Cagatay
- Natalie Tran
- Kiah Carter
- Michael Cusack
- Benjamin French
- Greta Lee Jackson
- Shae-Lee Kington
- Lana Kington
- Troy Kinne
- Madison Lloyd
- Adele Vuko
- George H. Xanthis
- Broden Kelly
- Zach Ruane
- Mark Samual Bonanno
- Samuel Lingham
- Thomas Armstrong
- Ken Rodrigues
- Justin Donnelly
- Max Miller
- Michelle Brasier
- Bjorn Stewart
- Colin Kinchela
- Katie Beckett
- Kodie Bedford

== See also ==
- List of Australian television series
