= Danielle Walker (comedian) =

Australian comedian and actor

- Born: 1992 or 1993 (age 33–34); Bluewater, Queensland, Australia
- Occupations: Comedian, actor
- Years active: 2016–present
- Television: Taskmaster Australia

Danielle Walker (born 1992 or 1993) is an Australian comedian and actor. Her career was launched after winning the RAW Comedy National Grand Final at the Melbourne International Comedy Festival in 2016. In 2023, she won the first season of the TV series Taskmaster Australia.

== Early life and education ==
Danielle Walker was born in 1992 or 1993 and grew up in Bluewater outside of Townsville in Queensland.

She briefly lived in London as a teenager and moved from Townsville to Melbourne, Victoria, in early 2015.

== Career ==
=== Live comedy ===
Walker's style of comedy has been called "strange" and, in a 2017 Melbourne International Comedy Festival (MICF) review, "dark and twisted".

At the 2016 MICF, Walker won the RAW Comedy National Grand Final. She won the Best Newcomer award at the MICF in 2018 for her comedy show Bush Rat. Later that year, Walker performed in London.

At the 2019 MICF, Walker performed a show titled Myths and Legends, which featured illustrations drawn by Walker. She presented her show Nostalgia at the MICF in 2022.

==== Television ====
On television, Walker has appeared on Get Krack!n, Tonightly with Tom Ballard, and Comedy Up Late.

Walker was a contestant on the first season of Network 10's Taskmaster Australia in 2023, and won the series. Also in 2023 she starred in the ABC comedy series Gold Diggers.

=== Other work ===
Walker co-hosted a podcast called Batch Bitch with Naomi Higgins, described as "A comedy podcast where we bitch about The Bachelor Australia (and The Bachelorette, and Bachelor in Paradise, and Married At First Sight)". The last episode was aired in November 2021.

== Awards ==
- 2016: RAW Comedy National Grand Final
- 2018: Melbourne International Comedy Festival, Best Newcomer, for Bush Rat
- 2018: Batch Bitch named Best Comedy Podcast of the year by Junkee.
- 2022: Pinder Prize at MICF, for Nostalgia
- 2022: Moosehead Award, for Nostalgia

== Filmography ==
TV Series	Year	Role	Notes
Taskmaster Australia	2023	Herself	Competitor and winner, series 1
Gold Diggers	2023	Marigold Brewer	
Thank God You're Here	2023	Herself	1 episode
Guy Montgomery's Guy Mont Spelling Bee	2024	Herself	1 episode
