= MasterChef Australia All-Stars =

- Genre: Cooking
- Judges: Gary Mehigan George Calombaris Matt Preston
- Narrated by: Nicholas McKay
- Theme music composer: Katy Perry
- Opening theme: Hot n Cold performed by Katy Perry
- Country of origin: Australia
- Original language: English
- No. of seasons: 1
- No. of episodes: 19

Production
- Production locations: 13 Doody Street, Alexandria, New South Wales
- Running time: 60 minutes
- Production company: Shine Australia

Original release
- Network: Network Ten
- Release: 26 July – 19 August 2012

Related
- MasterChef Australia series 4; MasterChef Australia

MasterChef Australia All-Stars is an Australian cooking reality show that aired on Network Ten from 26 July 2012. It featured a number of returning contestants from the first three seasons of MasterChef Australia (including season 1 and season 3 winners Julie Goodwin and Kate Bracks), revisiting past challenges in order to raise money for charity.

The series aired for three weeks, mostly during the 2012 Summer Olympics. It was also the last iteration of the show to be shot in the MasterChef kitchen in Alexandria, Sydney, home of the series for all past seasons.

== Contestants ==
The following contestants returned from seasons 2009 (Blue Team), 2010 (Red Team) and 2011 (Yellow Team). Notable absentees were Season 2010 winner Adam Liaw (due to shooting his new TV series) and Season 2011 runner-up Michael Weldon. The initial stages of the competition focused on the Teams raising money, but from episode 7, contestants competed separately and were eliminated in order to crown the 'best of the best' All-Star.

Contestant	Previous Season Placing	Charity	Money Raised	Status
Callum Hann	2nd	Cancer Council Australia	$20,000	Winner 19 August
Chris Badenoch	3rd	Lort Smith Animal Hospital	$15,000	Runner-up 19 August
Kate Bracks	1st	Lort Smith Animal Hospital	$11,000	Third Place 19 August
Justine Schofield	4th	Youth Off The Streets	$5,000	Eliminated 16 August
Julie Goodwin	1st	Oxfam	$15,000	Eliminated 14 August
Dani Venn	4th	Starlight Children's Foundation	$10,000	Eliminated 13 August
Poh Ling Yeow	2nd	Cambodian Children's Fund	$5,000	Eliminated 12 August
Marion Grasby	9th	Save the Children	$10,000	Eliminated 12 August
Jonathan Daddia	8th	OzHarvest	$5,000	Eliminated 8 August
Hayden Quinn	6th	Boys Town	$5,000	Eliminated 8 August
Aaron Harvie	7th	The Salvation Army	$5,000	Eliminated 6 August
Kumar Pereira	11th	Médecins Sans Frontières	$5,000	Eliminated 6 August

== Guest chefs ==
- Adriano Zumbo – Series Premiere
- Adrian Richardson – Immunity Challenge
- Dan Hong – Immunity Challenge
- Jeremy Strode – Immunity Challenge
- Martin Boetz – Immunity Challenge
- Darren Purchese – Immunity Challenge
- Alessandro Pavoni – Immunity Challenge
- Shaun Presland – Immunity Challenge
- Vincent Gadan – Immunity Challenge
- Curtis Stone – Elimination Challenge 2
- Neil Perry – MasterClass
- Maggie Beer – Grand Finale
- Peter Gilmore – Grand Finale

== Elimination chart ==
Contestants	Original Placing	Episode 1	Episode 2	Episode 3	Episode 4	Episode 5	Episode 6	Episode 7	Episode 8	Episode 9	Episode 10	Episode 11	Episode 12	Episode 13	Episode 14	Episode 15	Episode 16	Finale
Callum	2nd	Team 2nd	$5000	Team Win	IN	Team 2nd	IN	IN	IN	Top 4	Btm 6	IN	Btm 4	Top 2	Top 3	IN	Win	WINNER
Chris	3rd	Team 3rd	$5000	Team 3rd	IN	Team Win	IN	IN	Btm 5	Top 4	Btm 6	IN	Top 3	Top 2	Win	IN	Btm 2	Runner-Up
Kate	1st	$5000	IN	Team 2nd	Top 3	Team 3rd	IN	Win	Imm.	$5000	Imm.	Top 3	Btm 4	Btm 4	Top 3	Win	Imm.	Third Place
Justine	4th	Team 3rd	IN	Team 3rd	IN	Team Win	IN	Win	Imm.	Top 4	Btm 6	IN	IN	Btm 4	Btm 2	IN	Elim	Eliminated (Ep 16)
Julie	1st	Team 3rd	$5000	Team 3rd	IN	Team Win	$5000	IN	Top 2	IN	Btm 3	$5000	Win	Btm 4	Elim	Eliminated (Ep 14)		
Dani	4th	$5000	$5000	Team 2nd	IN	Team 3rd	IN	Win	Imm.	IN	IN	IN	Top 3	Elim	Eliminated (Ep 13)			
Poh	2nd	Team 3rd	IN	Team 3rd	IN	Team Win	$5000	IN	Btm 5	IN	IN	Top 3	Elim	Eliminated (Ep 12)				
Marion	9th	Team 2nd	IN	Team Win	$10000	Team 2nd	IN	IN	IN	IN	IN	IN	Elim	Eliminated (Ep 12)				
Jonathan	8th	Team 2nd	Btm 4	Team Win	IN	Team 2nd	IN	IN	Win	IN	Elim	Eliminated (Ep 10)						
Hayden	6th	$5000	Btm 4	Team 2nd	IN	Team 3rd	IN	IN	Btm 5	IN	Elim	Eliminated (Ep 10)						
Aaron	7th	Team 2nd	Btm 4	Team Win	IN	Team 2nd	IN	IN	Elim	Eliminated (Ep 8)								
Kumar	11th	$5000	Btm 4	Team 2nd	Top 3	Team 3rd	IN	IN	Elim	Eliminated (Ep 8)								
Notes	None								^{See note 1}	None	^{See note 2}	None				^{See note 3}	None	^{See note 4}
Eliminated	None								Aaron Kumar	None	Jonathan Hayden	None	Poh Marion	Dani	Julie	None	Justine	Kate; 31 points (out of 40)
Eliminated	None								Aaron Kumar	None	Jonathan Hayden	None	Poh Marion	Dani	Julie	None	Justine	Chris; 62 points (out of 80)
Eliminated	None								Aaron Kumar	None	Jonathan Hayden	None	Poh Marion	Dani	Julie	None	Justine	Callum; 70 points to win

- ^1 In Episode 8, Justine, Kate and Dani received immunity from the elimination challenge for winning the previous challenge.
- ^2 In Episode 10, Kate had immunity from the elimination challenge for winning the previous challenge.
- ^3 In Episode 15, Kate earned a pass straight into the finale for winning the challenge.
- ^4 In the Finale, the first round was an elimination round. Kate scored the fewest points and became the 3rd Place finisher.

== Episodes ==
Ep#	Original airdate	Episode Title / Event	Total viewers (5 Metro Cities)	Nightly Ranking	Weekly Ranking
1	Thursday 26 July 2012	Series Premiere: Croquembouche Challenge – The MasterChef All-Stars returned to the kitchen and were given a "rude awakening" by Adriano Zumbo with the greatest classic MasterChef dessert: Season 1's croquembouche. The Blue Team produced the worst copy of Zumbo's piece with various technical flaws. As it boiled down to the Red Team and the Yellow Team, the judges preferred the overall decoration and silky custard of the Yellows over the consistency and richer caramel of the Reds. The Yellows won the first $20,000 at $5,000 per contestant for their charity of choice.	1,256,000	1st	19th
2	Sunday 29 July 2012	International Challenge – The teams were faced with a four-round challenge, in which one member from each team cooked against each other. The winner of each round would earn $5,000 for their charity. Each team captain picked their champion, and the team that won the previous challenge would get to pick the cuisine to be cooked in the next round. As the Yellows won the previous challenge, team captain Kate got the first cuisine and contestant pick. She pitted herself against Julie and Jonathan in Lebanese food. Jonathan produced a bad dish, while Julie managed to snag a win. Julie then picked Poh to go up against Marion and Dani in Chinese. Dani scored a surprising win with her modern take on a traditional Chinese dessert. Kate then let Kumar take on Aaron and Chris in Indian cuisine, with Chris' sophisticated salmon dish taking the prize over top favourite Kumar's mussel curry. Justine, Callum and Hayden were assigned French cuisine by Julie, and it was Callum's dish that pulled off the first win for the Reds.	728,000	7th	38th
3	Monday 30 July 2012	Offsite Challenge – The teams prepared a sausage sizzle for 100 trainee firefighters. The winning team would be determined by total votes given by the firefighters and would be given an advantage for the next day's Mystery Box Challenge. The Blue Team's pork and fennel sausages splitting and oozing all their fat led them to be dry and left them in third place with 28 votes. It was a tie between the Yellows and Reds with 36 votes each. As the decision came down to the judges, they preferred the Red Team's dish despite inconsistency in size and pronounced them the winners.	826,000	9th	31st
4	Tuesday 31 July 2012	Mystery Box Challenge – The contestants found eight ingredients in their Mystery Boxes each chosen by a world-famous chef, including Heston Blumenthal's signature dry ice, Rick Stein's spanner crab and a sea urchin picked by Anthony Bourdain. Marion, Kate and Kumar cooked the top three dishes, and it was Marion's delicate and technical Crab and Sea Urchin Soufflé with Singaporean Black Pepper Sauce that earned $10,000 for her charity.	771,000	11th	37th
5	Wednesday 1 August 2012	Fix-That-Dish Challenge – The All-Stars participated in a race to be the first to finely dice 1 kilo of onions. The winner would get an advantage for their team in the upcoming challenge. Poh won it for the Blue Team. The Fix-That-Dish Challenge was a relais challenge in which the teams were to fix a poor bolognese in 45 minutes. Only the first in line would learn what the dish was, and each following team member would have to leave obvious hints for the next cook. The Blues' advantage consisted of all four team members knowing what the dish was and getting two minutes to strategize. The Yellows plated the worst dish, mostly due to errors from Kumar and Dani. It was between the Reds, who oversalted their bolognese by adding too much Parmesan at the end, and the Blues, who added too much sugar. It was the latter's choice to use pappardelle that got them the win, as it was deemed a better fit than spaghetti for a traditional bolognese.	852,000	7th	28th
6	Thursday 2 August 2012	Worst Nightmare Challenge – The Blues were each faced with three of their failed dishes from series 1. The dish they would have to revisit would be determined by a random draw from a knife block. It turned out to be an all-dessert challenge as every contestant drew a tricky dessert from the block. For Justine it was the Warm Pear Tart from the Celebrity Chef Challenge against Matt Moran (episode 44). For Chris, it was Zumbo's Vanilla Panna Cotta with Macaroons from Week 11's Pressure Test (episode 61). For Julie, it was her Passionfruit Puddle Pie from a Finals Week Elimination (episode 67) and for Poh, it was Matt Moran's Chocolate Tart from the Grand Finale. Poh and Chris got 2.5 hours to cook as their dishes were more intricate, while Julie and Justine had to wait on the balcony for an hour before their cooking time started. All three dishes showed great improvement from their season 1 counterparts, but Julie and Poh's were considered the top two. Though the judges considered both desserts virtually flawless, it was a split-hairs decision due to Poh failing to perfectly temper her chocolate on her highly technical dish. Julie won the $10,000 for Oxfam, but she decided to split it with Poh due to how close the decision was.	772,000	10th	36th
7	Sunday 5 August 2012	Immunity Challenge – Upon learning that two cooks would be eliminated in the next challenge, the All-Stars were pitted against twelve of the best chefs in Australia to win guaranteed immunity. Whoever cooked a better dish than the chef they were paired with, as judged in a blind tasting by three food critics, would receive immunity from the next day's Pressure Test. Kate, Dani and Justine were the only three to pull this off and received immunity. Chef Darren Purchese, paired with Kate, also promised an extra $1,000 donation from his restaurant to Kate's charity.	787,000	7th	31st
8	Monday 6 August 2012	Pressure Test – All contestants except for Dani, Kate and Justine (who had immunity) had to cook Gary's Beef Wellington with an accompanying red wine sauce in 2 hours and 15 minutes. Despite struggling with the dish's various elements, everyone managed to put up a passable dish. Jonathan, who had already cooked the dish in the Top 50 portion of Season 2, was "miles ahead" during cooking and delivered a stellar Wellington and sauce. Julie, Marion and Callum were also applauded. Chris, Poh, Aaron, Hayden and Kumar's dishes all had significant flaws, but Aaron and Kumar made the most mistakes and were eliminated.	753,000	11th	36th
9	Tuesday 7 August 2012	Where Are You Now? Challenge – With $5000 up for grabs, the contestants were asked to revisit and improve the first dish the cooked on MasterChef. After 75 minutes the standout dishes were Justine's Coq Au Vin, Callum's deconstructed Peaches and Cream, Chris' Chicken Tagine and Kate's Retro Coffee Cake. Kate won the challenge, winning the money for her charity and immunity from the next day's Elimination Challenge.	773,000	10th	32nd
10	Wednesday 8 August 2012	Elimination Challenge 1 – With two more people going home, the All Stars faced a three-round chicken elimination challenge. Given 30 minutes, unlimited use of the pantry and a whole chicken, the only catch was, if they went through to subsequent rounds the chicken they had leftover was all they had to use. Round one saw Dani, Marion and Poh safe as the best performers. With 20 minutes in the second round, this time it was Justine, Callum and Chris who produced the best dishes, leaving Julie, Hayden and Jonathan in the 10-minute round three. Despite all producing great dishes, Julie's had the slight edge over Hayden and Jonathan who were therefore eliminated. Jonathan received $5000 for his charity.	745,000	11th	38th
11	Thursday 9 August 2012	Cake Challenge – With $5,000 at stake for today's winner, the judges were joined by three members of the Country Women's Association. The All-Stars each had to bake and assemble a cake in 1 hour and 40 minutes and had to meet up to the CWA's exacting standards regarding flavour, size and overall look and detail. As no one received exceedingly bad comments, it came down to selecting a top three that made the least mistakes. Kate claimed third position with her lamingtons, Poh came in second with her passionfruit cake despite struggling to get it in the oven in time, and Julie's perfectly detailed Neapolitan cake scored the win and another $5,000 for Oxfam.	741,000	10th	40th
12	Sunday 12 August 2012	Mystery Box Challenge – Great joy among the All-Stars as they got to chop up their Mystery Boxes as kindling for a barbecue with prawn and chicken as core ingredients. Aside from the contents of the box, they each got to pick five ingredients from the pantry and were given 75 minutes to cook their barbecue dish. With such elementary cooking processes, there was very little room for error. In the end, the judges found at least some fault with Kate, Marion, Poh and Callum's creations, and Marion and Poh were sent home as the producers of the two worst dishes.	779,000	10th	38th
13	Monday 13 August 2012	Dessert Challenge – The final six were tasked with reproducing George's "Zeus and his 8 Mistresses" dessert in 3 hours. The extremely intricate dish with 13 recipes proved highly challenging: it included a chocolate mousse with a liquid center surrounded by a chocolate crack, a white chocolate aero, chocolate clay, a salted caramel sauce, a chocolate sorbet, chocolate cake, caramelized pear balls, salt and vinegar chocolate sticks, assorted berries and flowers and a tempered chocolate gold bar in a decorative box to symbolize Zeus' wife, Hera. Chris and Callum produced the standout dishes, as only they managed to put every element on the plate. It was Dani who was sent home for failing to plate three elements of the dish and some other technical errors.	702,000	17th	>40th
14	Tuesday 14 August 2012	Elimination Challenge 2 – Guest chef Curtis Stone entered the kitchen again, this time to set a two-round elimination challenge. In the first round, the All-Stars had to keep up with Stone as he cooked his signature dish of Lobster Ravioli with a Shellfish Sauce, Caramellized Butternut Pumpkin, Sage, Lemon and Pine Nuts. Chris produced the best dish (with only his sauce lacking some flavour) and was pronounced safe after the first round. In the second round, the remaining contestants had to cook a dish with one of four of Stone's favourite Australian core ingredients. Callum and Justine opted for artichokes, while Julie chose the pork and Kate the apples, to make the only dessert of the night. Callum and Kate received good comments overall. Curtis thought Justine's dish was "odd" and Gary also didn't like the idea of putting two dishes on the same plate. Julie had some trouble with her pork in the pressure cooker, but pulled herself together in time to plate up a Plan B. Despite being commended for her survival instincts in the kitchen, Julie was sent home.	788,000	13th	36th
15	Wednesday 15 August 2012	Seafood Challenge – The final four All Stars cooked for a guaranteed place in the Finale, preparing seafood dishes for 100 Navy heroes. With a little help from some MasterChef 2012 favourites (Andy, Ben, Amina and Julia), each contestant had a different type of seafood (Callum – salmon, Justine – crab, Chris – prawns, Kate – squid). Judging was tight, as each dish was praised and only slightly criticised, but Kate and Julia's Chilli Squid Salad that was judged as the best dish, meaning Kate became the first All Star to make it through to the Finale.	751,000	13th	39th
16	Thursday 16 August 2012	Elimination Challenge 3 – The All-Stars were confronted with their own favourite ingredients (chestnuts for Justine, beer for Chris and mushrooms for Callum) and had to cook a dish with each other's ingredients in three 45-minute rounds. The cook of the best dish would receive 3 points, the second 2 points and the loser 1 point. The two highest scoring cooks at the end of the final round would join Kate – who had immunity – in the Grand Finale. Callum was triumphant and took 3 points in the mushroom round, putting up a dish that would fit on any Two-hat menu according to Matt Preston. Justine took 2 points and Chris 1. Surprisingly, Callum also took the win in the beer round with his Stout Panna Cotta. Beer lover Chris got 2 points, Justine got 1. With Callum at 6 points and the others both at 3, he became technically unbeatable for points and therefore didn't have to cook in the final round. Chris was pitted against Justine in her favourite ingredient chestnuts. With both delivering an excellent dish according to the judges, they had to make a split-hairs decision to determine the winner. Chris came out on top, and Justine was eliminated. As with other eliminated contestants that hadn't raised any money for their charity, she also earned a default $5,000 for the Chris Riley Foundation.	797,000	10th	32nd
17	Friday 17 August 2012	MasterClass	666,000	10th	>40th
18	Sunday 19 August 2012	Finale Night – Kate, Callum and Chris faced off in the Grand Finale, consisting of two rounds.: Sudden Death – The first round was a Sudden Death challenge: the maker of the worst dish would strand in third place, with the remaining two moving to the deciding round. Maggie Beer came in and asked the top three to cook a family-style feast. Kate's dish had the most inconsistencies, with some of her roast pheasant left completely raw and the rest cooked perfectly. She was also criticized on her "boring" side of steamed beetroot, hastily put together as she ran out of time. Callum and Chris were sent into the final round, with 36 and 32 points, respectively.; Snow Egg Challenge – Peter Gilmore from Quay restaurant in Sydney entered the kitchen with a new version of what could be considered the most infamous dessert in the history of the show: his Snow Egg from the 2010 Grand Finale. This updated version featured jackfruit as the core ingredient, as opposed to the strawberry guava in the original. As Callum had already made this dish as a Season 2 finalist, Chris was first shown how to plate up the dish to level the playing field. Both versions of the dish got positive and negative feedback from the judges, joined by Gilmore, but in the end Callum's was considered slightly superior. He took the challenge with 34 points out of a possible 40, to Chris' 30.	802,000	11th	34th
19	Sunday 19 August 2012	The Winner Announced – Callum was pronounced the winner, with 70 points over Chris' 62. He wins $25,000 for the Cancer Council, but decides to split his winnings with Chris and donates $10,000 to the Lort Smith Animal Hospital.	1,050,000	7th	22nd

== International syndications ==
Country	Network
Belgium	Vitaya
India	Star World
Ireland	Watch
Italy	Sky Uno
New Zealand	TVNZ One
Singapore	MediaCorp Channel 5
Portugal	SIC Mulher
The Netherlands	Net5
United Kingdom	Watch
UAE	Fox
RSA	M-Net
Poland	TLC

== See also ==
- List of Australian television series
- MasterChef Australia

Preceded by MasterChef Australia (season 4)	Masterchef Australia All-Stars; 26 July 2012 – 19 August 2012	Succeeded by MasterChef Australia: The Professionals
