= MasterChef Australia contestants with television series =

MasterChef Australia is a television cooking competition that is typically broadcast for three months each year since 2009. There are generally 24 contestants each year.

A number of those contestants, who were untrained home cooks at the time of their appearance, have gone on to host their own television cooking series.

Contestants	Series	Programs
Andy Allen	Series 4 (2012)	Andy and Ben Eat Australia, Farm to Fork, MasterChef Australia series 12, Three Blue Ducks, MasterChef Australia series 13, Celebrity MasterChef Australia series 2, MasterChef Australia series 14, MasterChef Australia series 15, MasterChef Australia series 16
Tim Bone	Series 11 (2019)	Good Chef Bad Chef
Diana Chan	Series 9 (2017)	Asia Unplated with Diana Chan
Emma Dean	Series 5 (2013)	My Market Kitchen
Elena Duggan	Series 8 (2016)	My Market Kitchen
Julie Goodwin	Series 1 (2009)	Home Cooked! With Julie Goodwin
Marion Grasby	Series 2 (2010)	Marion's Thailand, Flavours of Heart & Home
Adam Liaw	Series 2 (2010)	Destination Flavour, Destination Flavour: Japan, Destination Flavour: Down Under, Destination Flavour: Scandinavia, Destination Flavour: Singapore, Hidden Japan with Adam Liaw, Destination Flavour: China, The Cook Up with Adam Liaw, Adam & Poh's Malaysia in Australia, Adam & Poh's Great Australian Bites, Good Food Kitchen
Ben Milbourne	Series 4 (2012)	Ben's Menu, Andy and Ben Eat Australia, Food Lab
Audra Morrice	Series 4 (2012)	Tasty Conversations, MasterChef Asia, MasterChef Singapore, Audra's Eat, Roam, Relish
Khanh Ong	Series 10 (2018)	My Market Kitchen, Khanh Ong's Wild Food
Hayden Quinn	Series 3 (2011)	The Dinner Project, Surfing The Menu: The Next Generation, Hayden Quinn's South Africa, Taste of Australia with Hayden Quinn
Courtney Roulston	Series 2 (2010)	The Cook's Pantry, Farm to Fork
Justine Schofield	Series 1 (2009)	Everyday Gourmet with Justine Schofield, Tropical Gourmet Queensland, Tropical Gourmet: New Caledonia and Justine's Flavours of Fuji.
Laura Sharrad	Series 6 (2014)	My Market Kitchen
Matt Sinclair	Series 8 (2016)	The Cook's Pantry, My Market Kitchen
Lynton Tapp	Series 5 (2013)	My Market Kitchen
Sarah Todd	Series 6 (2014)	My Restaurant in India, My Second Restaurant in India, Serve it like Sarah, Awesome Assam with Sarah Todd, Grilled
Simon Toohey	Series 11 (2019)	Freshly Pickled with Simon Toohey
Dani Venn	Series 3 (2011)	Weekend Feast
Michael Weldon	Series 3 (2011)	The Cook's Pantry, Farm to Fork
Poh Ling Yeow	Series 1 (2009)	Poh's Kitchen, Poh's Kitchen on the Road, Poh & Co., Snackmasters, Adam & Poh's Malaysia in Australia, Adam & Poh's Great Australian Bites, MasterChef Australia series 16
Alice Zaslavsky	Series 4 (2012)	A Bite to Eat with Alice
