= MasterChef Australia series 1 =

MasterChef Australia
- Season 1
- Judges: Matt Preston; George Calombaris; Gary Mehigan
- No. of contestants: 20
- Winner: Julie Goodwin
- Runner-up: Poh Ling Yeow
- No. of episodes: 72

Release
- Original network: Network Ten
- Original release: 27 April – 19 July 2009

Series chronology
- Next → Series 2

The first series of the Australian reality television series MasterChef Australia began on 27 April 2009 and aired on Network Ten, concluding on 19 July 2009 when Julie Goodwin was crowned the winner. The series was hosted by Sarah Wilson.

The inaugural season runner-up, Poh Ling Yeow is now one of the judges alongside Jean-Christophe Novelli, Sofia Levin, and season 4 winner and season 12 judge, Andy Allen

== Contestants ==
Contestant	Age	State	Occupation	Status
Julie Goodwin	38	NSW	Office Manager	Winner 19 July
Poh Ling Yeow	35	SA	Artist	Runner-up 19 July; Returned 1 July; Eliminated 18 June
Chris Badenoch	41	VIC	Beer Merchant	Eliminated 16 July
Justine Schofield	23	NSW	Sales Executive	Eliminated 15 July; Returned 1 July; Eliminated 25 June
Julia Jenkins	23	VIC	Marketing Specialist	Eliminated 14 July
Lucas Parsons	39	NSW	Coffee Shop Owner	Eliminated 13 July
Andre Ursini	28	SA	Project Manager	Eliminated 9 July
Sam Ciaravolo	24	VIC	Call Centre Manager	Eliminated 6 July
Tom Mosby	39	QLD	Solicitor	Eliminated 2 July; Returned 1 July; Eliminated 8 June
Eugenia "Geni" Papacostas	58	QLD	Teaching Assistant	Eliminated 15 June
Sandra Moreno	36	QLD	Stay-At-Home Mum	Eliminated 11 June
Trevor Forster	37	WA	Navy Submariner	Eliminated 4 June
Aaron Thomas	21	VIC	Student	Eliminated 1 June
Kate Rodrigues	20	WA	Law Student	Eliminated 28 May
Josh Catalano	25	WA	Fishmonger	Eliminated 21 May
Michelle Darlington	46	NSW	Photographer	Eliminated 18 May
Brent Parker-Jones	40	VIC	Food Photographer	Eliminated 14 May
Linda Kowalski	21	VIC	Student	Eliminated 11 May
Pasquale "Nic" Ciampa	38	VIC	Wine Shop Owner	Quit 10 May
Melissa Lutton	38	QLD	Graphic Designer	Eliminated 7 May

Subsequent appearances

- Julie Goodwin appeared on Series 2 as a guest judge for an invention test and for masterclass.
- Poh Ling Yeow appeared on 1st Junior Series for a masterclass.
- Andre Ursini appeared on Series 3 to give a lesson for masterclass
- Julie again appeared on Series 4 to be a guest judge for a Mystery box Challenge.
- In a Special All Star Series for Charity, Julie and Poh took part along with Justine Schofield and Chris Badenoch. Poh came 7th, Julie came 5th, Justine came 4th & Chris came Runner Up.
- Joshua "Josh" Catalano appeared in the team challenge during "Wild West Week" of Series 5. Chris latter appeared when his restaurant appeared for a team challenge during "Dream Week".
- Julie appeared at the first Mystery box challenge & Invention test of Series 6.
- In a Superstar themed week in Series 7 Poh appeared as a guest for a mystery box challenge and masterclass, while Justine appeared as a guest judge for an elimination challenge.
- In Series 10 Julie appeared to support the top 50 during auditions, Poh meanwhile appeared during South Australia week for a masterclass. Julie later appeared along with Andre at the Semi Finals as a guest during dinner service.
- Poh was a mentor during the immunity challenge in Series 11.
- Poh and Chris appeared in Series 12. Chris was eliminated on 10 May 2020, finishing in 18th and Poh was eliminated on 5 July 2020, finishing in 6th.
- Poh also appeared in Series 13 as guest judge for an elimination challenge.
- In Series 14 Julie appeared for a chance to win the title for the 2nd time. Julie was eliminated on 5 July 2022, finishing in 5th.
- In Series 15 Poh appeared as a guest judge for a Mystery Box Challenge. Julie later appeared as a guest judge for an elimination challenge.
- In Series 16 Poh will appear as a judge. Julie & Andre later appeared as a guest for the first service challenge.
- Andre appeared on Series 17 and was eliminated on 1 July 2025, finishing 10th. Julie later appeared as a guest judge for an elimination challenge.

== Judges ==
- George Calombaris
- Gary Mehigan
- Matt Preston

== Special guests ==
- Manu Feildel – Celebrity Chef Challenge 1
- Martin Boetz – Celebrity Chef Challenge 2
- Pete Evans – Celebrity Chef Challenge 3
- Frank Shek – Masterclass 3
- Alex Herbert – Celebrity Chef Challenge 4
- John Torode – Guest judge, Invention Test 4
- Guy Grossi – Celebrity Chef Challenge 5
- Ben O'Donoghue – Celebrity Chef Challenge 6
- Donovan Cooke/Tam Kin Pak – Celebrity Chef Challenge 8
- Emmanuel Stroobant – Celebrity Chef Challenge 9
- Adrian Richardson – Celebrity Chef Challenge 10
- Adriano Zumbo – Elimination Challenge 7
- Armando Percuoco – Guest judge, Formal Dinner Challenge
- Margaret Fulton – Guest judge, Formal Dinner Challenge
- Jacques Reymond – Guest judge, Formal Dinner Challenge
- Cheong Liew – Guest judge, Formal Dinner Challenge
- Luke Mangan – Guest judge, Finals Week Elimination Challenge 1
- Matt Moran – Celebrity Chef Challenge 7 & Guest judge, Finals Week Elimination Challenge 2
- Bill Granger – Guest judge, Finals Week Elimination Challenge 3
- Donna Hay – Guest judge, Finals Week Elimination Challenge 4
- Peter Kuruvita – Guest judge, Fresh Seafood Team Challenge
- Curtis Stone – Guest judge, Seafood Team Challenge, Grand Finale

Many of the guest chefs returned for the announcement of the winner, while Moran also presented a dish for the Pressure Test during the finale.

== Elimination Chart ==
No.	Week	1	2		3		4		5		6		7		8		9	10		11		Finals Week					
No.	Mystery Box Challenge Winner	None	None		Chris		Poh		Tom		Julie		Chris		Poh		None	Andre		Poh		Julia	None				
No.	Invention Test Winner	None	Sam		Brent		Julia		Chris		Justine		Lucas; Justine		Justine		None	Andre		Justine; Julie		Chris	Poh	Poh	Chris	Poh	Julie
1	Julie	Top 20	IN	Team Win	Btm 3	Team Win	IN	Geni	IN	Team Win	Btm 3	Team Win	Btm 4	Team Win	IN	Win	Btm 2	Btm 2	2.	I.T. Winner	2.	Btm 3	Btm 3	Btm 3	Top 2	Btm 2	WINNER
2	Poh	Top 20	IN	Melissa	IN	Team Win	Top 3	Josh	Top 3	Team Win	IN	Trevor	Btm 4	Sandra	Btm 3	Elim	Eliminated (Ep 46)		3.	Btm 4	3.	Btm 3	Win	Win	Btm 2	Win	Runner-Up
3	Chris	Top 20	IN	Team Win	IN	Team Win	IN	Josh	I.T. Winner	Team Win	Top 3	Team Win	Btm 4	Team Win	IN	Win	Immune	Top 2	5.	Btm 4	5.	Win	Top 3	Btm 3	Win	Elim	Eliminated (Ep 70)
4	Justine	Top 20	IN	Team Win	IN	Team Win	IN	Team Win	IN	Team Win	I.T. Winner	Team Win	I.T. Winner	Team Win	I.T. Winner	Win	Elim	Eliminated (Ep 52)	1.	I.T. Winner	1.	Top 3	Top 3	Top 2	Elim	Re-Eliminated (Ep 69)	
5	Julia	Top 20	IN	Melissa	IN	Brent	I.T. Winner	Pass to Finale (Ep 20)														Top 3	Btm 3	Elim	Eliminated (Ep 68)		
6	Lucas	Top 20	IN	Melissa	IN	Brent	Top 3	Team Win	IN	Kate	IN	Team Win	I.T. Winner	Pass to Finale (Ep 38)								Btm 3	Elim	Eliminated (Ep 67)			
7	Andre	Top 20	IN	Team Win	IN	Team Win	IN	Josh	IN	Team Win	IN	Trevor	IN	Sandra	Btm 3	Win	Win	I.T. Winner	4.	Btm 4	4./Elim	Eliminated (Ep 64)					
8	Sam	Top 20	I.T. Winner	Melissa	IN	Brent	Btm 3	Team Win	Btm 3	Sandra	IN	Trevor	IN	Team Win	IN	Btm 2	Win	Btm 2	7.	Elim	Eliminated (Ep 61)						
9	Tom	Top 20	IN	Team Win	Top 3	Team Win	IN	Team Win	Btm 3	Kate	Top 3	Team Win	Elim	Eliminated (Ep 37)					6./Elim	Re-Eliminated (Ep 58)							
10	Geni	Top 20	IN	Team Win	Top 3	Team Win	IN	Josh	IN	Team Win	IN	Trevor	IN	Sandra	Elim	Eliminated (Ep 43)											
11	Sandra	Top 20	IN	Team Win	IN	Team Win	IN	Team Win	Top 3	Kate	Btm 3	Team Win	IN	Andre	Evicted (Ep 40)												
12	Trevor	Top 20	IN	Team Win	IN	Brent	IN	Team Win	Btm 3	Sandra	IN	Sam	Evicted (Ep 34)														
13	Aaron	Top 20	Btm 2	Team Win	Btm 3	Brent	IN	Josh	IN	Team Win	Elim	Eliminated (Ep 31)															
14	Kate	Top 20	Top 3	Michelle	IN	Brent	Btm 3	Team Win	IN	Sandra/Kate	Evicted (Ep 28)																
15	Josh	Top 20	Top 3	Melissa	IN	Brent	IN	Aaron	Evicted (Ep 22)																		
16	Michelle	Top 20	IN	Kate	IN	Brent	Elim	Eliminated (Ep 19)																			
17	Brent	Top 20	IN	Melissa	I.T. Winner	Aaron	Evicted (Ep 16)																				
18	Linda	Top 20	IN	Team Win	Elim	Eliminated (Ep 13)																					
19	Nic	Top 20	IN	Melissa	Quit																						
20	Melissa	Top 20	Btm 2	Nic	Evicted (Ep 10)																						
	Notes	^{See note 1}	^{See note 2}	None				^{See note 3}	^{See note 4}	^{See note 5}	None		^{See note 6}	None		^{See note 7}	^{See note 8}	^{See note 9}		^{See note 10}	None						^{See note 11}
	Evicted/Eliminated	None	None	Melissa 7 of 10 votes to evict	Linda Nic (Left)	Brent 8 of 9 votes to evict	Michelle	Josh 5 of 7 votes to evict	None	Kate 4 of 7 votes to evict	Aaron	Trevor 4 of 5 votes to evict	Tom 1st Elimination	Sandra 3 of 4 votes to evict	Geni	Poh 1st Elimination	Justine 1st Elimination	None	Tom Re-Eliminated	Sam	Andre	None	Lucas	Julia	Justine Re-Eliminated	Chris	Poh; 75 points to win
	Evicted/Eliminated	None	None	Melissa 7 of 10 votes to evict	Linda Nic (Left)	Brent 8 of 9 votes to evict	Michelle	Josh 5 of 7 votes to evict	None	Kate 4 of 7 votes to evict	Aaron	Trevor 4 of 5 votes to evict	Tom 1st Elimination	Sandra 3 of 4 votes to evict	Geni	Poh 1st Elimination	Justine 1st Elimination	None	Tom Re-Eliminated	Sam	Andre	None	Lucas	Julia	Justine Re-Eliminated	Chris	Julie; 82 points to win

^1 In Week 1, nobody from the top 20 was eliminated. During this week the judges selected the twenty finalists from the top 50.
^2 In Week 2, nobody was eliminated after the Invention Test. Instead, the bottom 2 chefs had to clean up all the dishes from the challenge.
^3 In Week 4, Julia won the Celebrity Chef Challenge and a free pass till Finals Week
^4 In Week 5, nobody was eliminated after the pressure test challenge as judges chose to spare Sam and Trevor as the differences between the dishes were too trivial.
^5 In Week 5, the vote was tied 3 to 3 for Sandra and Kate. As Team Captain, the tiebreaking vote went to Kate. She voted to send herself home.
^6 In Week 7, Justine and Lucas won the Invention Test as a pair. However, only one of them was allowed to compete in the Celebrity Chef Challenge. Justine volunteered Lucas to go. Lucas won, and got a free pass till finals week
^7 In Week 8, there was not a team challenge. Instead, the contestants competed in a wedding challenge. The top 4 performers advanced, whereas the bottom 2 performers went into a taste test elimination.
^8 In Week 9, the remaining chefs went to Hong Kong. In the Dim Sum Challenge, Sam won and elected to take Justine on his reward with him. In the High Tea/Rainbow Fish Challenge, contestants divided into groups of Justine/Julie/Andre and Chris/Sam. Julie won by outcooking finalist Lucas. In a pre-elimination challenge, Chris won immunity and won the power to select teams for elimination. He selected Justine/Julie and Sam/Andre.
^9 In Week 10, Sam and Julie were the bottom 2 performers in the Invention Test, but were spared going into elimination. In a special Dream Restaurant Challenge, Chris won and received a reward. Former contestants Justine, Poh, and Tom returned to get a second chance. In a Navy canteen, everyone prepared a meal for 200 people, the 2 meals voted for the least, went into elimination. As the elimination challenge, Tom and Sam went into a taste test elimination.
^10 In Week 11, Justine and Julie won the Invention Test as a pair. However, only one of them was allowed to compete in the Celebrity Chef Challenge. Julie won a coin flip and won the right to compete against a Celebrity Chef.
^11 Poh and Julie competed against each other in three rounds consisting of a Taste Test, an Invention Test and a Pressure Test. Points would be earned for each test, with the winner decided based on the final tally after the three tests.

== Episodes and ratings ==
Colour key:
– Highest rating during the series
– Lowest rating during the series

Ep#/Wk-Ep#	Original airdate	Episode Title / Event	Total viewers	Nightly Ranking	Weekly Ranking (Sun/Overall Mon-Fri)
Week 1
1/01-1	Monday 27 April 2009	Series Premiere: Auditions Part 1 – Australia is introduced to their first series of 'Masterchef' and its judges; chefs and restaurateurs Gary Mehigan and George Calombaris along with world renowned food critic Matt Preston. Hosted by Sarah Wilson, the judges are touring Australia for the best amateur cooks to join them in the Masterchef competition. With 50 spots available country wide, the judges begin with Sydney & Adelaide. Despite Adelaide's shaky start, both cities prove to carry an incredible amount of talent and as result, 18 of the Top 50 spots are filled.	1,428,000	7th	14th
2/01-2	Tuesday 28 April 2009	Auditions Part 2 – Continuing on with their search for Australia's best amateur cooks, the judges visit both Brisbane & Perth. The two cities' talent pools manage to impress the judges yet again, filling up another 18 spots between the two of them.	1,056,000	17th	52nd
3/01-3	Wednesday 29 April 2009	Auditions Part 3 – The final stop on the judges tour of Australia is Melbourne, the food capital of Australia. With the final 14 spots managing to get filled, Melbourne certainly lived up to its name. With the Top 50 having now been decided, the chosen amateurs are sent to Sydney where they will undergo a series of challenges over the coming days. By the end of these challenges, only 20 will remain and continue on into the Masterchef competition. The Top 50's first challenge is a simple task of dicing onions. The 12 amateurs that possess the weakest knife skills as deemed by the judges are sent into the next challenge where half of them will be eliminated from the competition.	994,000	15th	57th
4/01-4	Thursday 30 April 2009	Top 50 Part 1 – The 12 weakest performers in the onion dicing challenge are tasked with cooking a dish that will 'wow' the judges using only the limited ingredients available in the pantry. With only 45 minutes on the clock, the pressure proved to be too much for some. One hopeful contestant withdraws from the competition to pursue an apprenticeship leaving the judges to eliminate the other 5 contestants who produced the worst dishes of the day. The remaining 44 contestants are then given the task of identifying as many of the 17 ingredients in George's special bolognese sauce as they can. The 11 contestants that guess the fewest correct ingredients will be sent into the next elimination challenge.	1,025,000	14th	42nd
5/01-5	Friday 1 May 2009	Top 50 Part 2 – The 11 worst performers of the taste test are brought to Sydney's famous fish markets. Their task is to prepare a two course seafood meal in just 2 hours. However that time must also be used to shop for ingredients and make their way back to the kitchen. Many of the contestants found themselves with under one hour left to cook which proved to be a major downfall for some. After tasting all the dishes, the judges eliminate three of the five amateurs who produced the worst dishes. With two more amateurs set to be eliminated, the choice came down to Michelle, Tom and Josh. However, in a surprising turn of events, the judges chose not to eliminate any of them, due to their mistakes in the challenge not being severe enough to warrant elimination.	954,000	10th	64th
Week 2
6/02-1	Sunday 3 May 2009	Top 20 Revealed	1,098,000	9th	39th
7/02-2	Monday 4 May 2009	Top 20 Cooking Challenge	1,237,000	8th	(1,154,000) 28th
8/02-3	Tuesday 5 May 2009	Celebrity Chef Challenge 1 – Manu Feildel beat Sam	1,159,000	9th	(1,154,000) 28th
9/02-4	Wednesday 6 May 2009	Sushi Restaurant Team Challenge – Sam was given captainship of the Blue Team for winning the Invention Test and chose Sandra as the captain of the Red Team. Sam chose, Kate, Josh, Lucas, Poh, Julia, Melissa, Nic, Michelle and Brent, while Sandra chose Chris, Tom, Julie, Justine, Tom, Geni, Aaron, Andre and Linda. Winner: Red Team	1,241,000	5th	(1,154,000) 28th
10/02-5	Thursday 7 May 2009	Team Elimination – Having lost the challenge, the Blue Team contemplated whom to eliminate. Michelle considered voting out Sam as a strategic move, but chose to vote out Kate, and Kate chose to vote out Michelle, and Melissa chose to vote out Nic for his lack of assistance, but the majority of the team decided to vote out Melissa as she "can't even chop."	982,000	14th	(1,154,000) 28th
11/02-6	Friday 8 May 2009	Masterclass 1 – Cooking with the masters – Lamb Rack with Pomme Puree, Pain Perdu with Chocolate Olive Oil Mousse.	1,016,000	7th	(1,154,000) 28th
Week 3
12/03-1	Sunday 10 May 2009	Mystery Box Challenge – Before the challenge starts, Nic tells the other contestants that he is leaving to be with his wife. The challenge ingredients are bread, eggs, tomatoes, smoky bacon. Top three were Chris, Trevor, and Poh. Chris won for his "Eggs in Hell." Invention Test 1 – Italian theme using rabbit, chosen by Chris as his reward for winning the Mystery Box Challenge, along with the advantage of having five minutes in the pantry rather than the one minute the other contestants could use to select their ingredients. Three best dishes were Brent, Tom, Jenny. Three worst were Julie, Aaron, and Linda. Brent was chosen winner for his Braised Rabbit with Capsicum, Onions, and Fennel, Roasted Potatoes, Charred Zucchini, and Sweated Red Onions.	1,472,000	3rd	6th
13/03-2	Monday 11 May 2009	Pressure Test Elimination – Julie, Aaron and Linda landed in the Bottom 3 for their disasters in the invention test. They were asked to make a tarte tatin (apple tart) using a basic recipe with Julie's being deemed the best. The judges criticized Aaron for "running before he could walk" but ultimately chose Linda to be eliminated as besides her poor dish, she proved too inconsistent.	1,331,000	4th	(1,172,000) 28th
14/03-3	Tuesday 12 May 2009	Celebrity Chef Challenge 2 – Martin Boetz beat Brent cooking the signature Longrain dish of Eggnet, Pork, Prawns, and Cucumber Relish. Brent had 1 hour 15 minutes to make the dish, while Martin had 45 minutes and spent the first half-hour of Brent's time helping him because he "[hated] to see someone stressing when it's unnecessary." The judges gave Brent's dish 6/6/5 and Martin's dish 8/8/9 out of ten.	1,252,000	8th	(1,172,000) 28th
15/03-4	Wednesday 13 May 2009	Seafood Banquet Team Challenge – Brent was given captainship of the Blue Team for winning the invention test and chose Geni as the captain of the Red Team. Brent chose Sam, Trevor, Josh, Lucas, Kate, Julia, Michelle, and Aaron, and Geni chose Chris, Tom, Justine, Andre, Poh, Julie, and Sandra. Taken to the Vaucluse Yacht club, the contestants were divided into two teams and told they had $500 to plan, make, and serve a banquet for ten people. Chef Curtis Stone was invited to both teams' banquets as a guest judge. Winner: Red Team	1,191,000	10th	(1,172,000) 28th
16/03-5	Thursday 14 May 2009	Team Elimination – The Blue Team faced elimination. All members selected one member to leave the competition. In the end, while he voted for Aaron, the others decided to vote out Brent, as they believed his poor direction let them down.	1,007,000	14th	(1,172,000) 28th
17/03-6	Friday 15 May 2009	Masterclass 2 – Class is in – Poached Egg Salad with Tomato Tea (consommé), Roast Saddle of Rabbit with White Bean Puree, Ricotta Tortellini, Eton Mess. The chefs expressed surprise that Brent had been voted off. Calombaris said, "Interesting. Really interesting."	1,030,000	8th	(1,172,000) 28th
Week 4
18/04-1	Sunday 17 May 2009	Mystery Box Challenge: Chocolate, oranges, eggs, sugar, coconut, flour. Top three: Trevor's Coconut Dumplings Baked in Custard, Geni's Intense Orange & Chocolate Pudding, and Poh's Chocolate Pikelets with Orange Sauce. Winner: Poh. Invention Test 2 – Chinese theme, using mixed mushrooms chosen by Poh as her reward for winning the Mystery Box Challenge. Poh gets five minutes in the pantry; everyone else gets 2 minutes. Top three: Poh, Julia, Lucas. Bottom three: Sam, Michelle, Kate. Winner: Julia for her Mushroom & Vegetable Dumplings with Broth.	1,456,000	3rd	9th
19/04-2	Monday 18 May 2009	Pressure Test Elimination – Michelle, Sam and Kate had to follow a basic recipe to cook chargrilled, stuffed squid in their challenge. Despite not having the time to cook her squid, Kate managed to produce the best of the three. Michelle's was deemed worse than Sam's and she was sent packing.	1,388,000	4th	(1,248,000) 25th
20/04-3	Tuesday 19 May 2009	Celebrity Chef Challenge 3 – Julia beats Peter Evans preparing Tea-Smoked Duck Breast with Ravioli with Water Chestnut, Pear, and Duck Liver with Blood Orange Sauce, Spinach, and Crispy Fried Ginger. The judges give Julia 9/9/9 and Peter 8/8/8 out of 10 and Julia leaves the competition, guaranteed of a spot in finals week, and Peter Evans offers her mentoring in his kitchen while the rest of the competition continues.	1,291,000	7th	(1,248,000) 25th
21/04-4	Wednesday 20 May 2009	Food Critics Team Challenge – The judges chose the team captains: Red team Chris and Blue team Kate. Kate picks Sam, Trevor, Justine, Tom, Lucas, Sandra, and Chris picks Josh, Andre, Poh, Julie, Aaron, and Geni. Challenge is a three-course meal in one hour using a limited pantry and with extra team members George and Gary, to be served to Matt Preston and fellow food critics Simon Thomsen and Larissa Dubecki. Winner: Blue Team	1,291,000	7th	(1,248,000) 25th
22/04-5	Thursday 21 May 2009	Team Elimination – At elimination, most of the team feel that Josh's abilities were inadequate and believe that he was the main flaw in determining their loss. Almost all the team, with the exception of Julie voting for Geni and Josh himself voting for Aaron, vote for Josh, sending him home.	1,146,000	6th	(1,248,000) 25th
23/04-6	Friday 22 May 2009	Masterclass 3 – Soufflés and stir-fries – Chilli and Fennel Squid, Chinese Mushroom Stir-fry with Tofu, Chocolate and Jaffa Soufflé. The chefs express surprise that Josh had been the one voted off.	1,083,000	6th	(1,248,000) 25th
Week 5
24/05-1	Sunday 24 May 2009	Mystery Box Challenge: Eggs, chili peppers, ale, potato, whole red snapper in 30 minutes. The judges announce they will taste the top 5: Sandra, Julie, Geni, Tom, Andre. Winner: Tom for his Lemon Snapper with Chilli and Ginger. Invention Test 3: French theme. Tom's choice is between gruyere cheese, sweet shortcrust pastry, or ribeye beef. He chooses the beef and has five minutes to choose the rest of his ingredients from the pantry. The remaining contestants get 2 minutes to select no more than ten ingredients. Top three: Chris, Poh, Sandra. Winner: Chris for his Steak Tartare. Bottom three: Trevor, Sam, Tom.	1,671,000	2nd	2nd
25/05-2	Monday 25 May 2009	Pressure Test Elimination – Trevor, Sam and Tom had to make a Sticky Date & Toffee Pudding with Butterscotch Sauce and Almond Praline from a provided recipe. There were only minor issues in each dessert, but overall Tom's was deemed the best. The judges chose to spare Sam and Trevor as the differences between the dishes were too trivial.	1,443,000	3rd	(1,318,000) 21st
26/05-3	Tuesday 26 May 2009	Celebrity Chef Challenge 4 – Chris competed against Alex Herbert of Bird Cow Fish and had to make one of her signature dishes, Potato Gnocchi with Sauteed Prawns in a Burnt Butter Sauce. He had an hour and forty-five minutes, while she had an hour and fifteen. The judges gave Chris 7/8/6 and Alex 8/9/8 out of ten. Winner: Alex Herbert.	1,276,000	8th	(1,318,000) 21st
27/05-4	Wednesday 27 May 2009	Royal Easter Show Team Challenge – Team captains are Chris (Red Team) for winning the Invention Test. He picks Kate for Blue Team captain. Chris picks Justine, Poh, Andre, Julie, Aaron, Geni and Kate picks Tom, Trevor, Sam, Lucas, Sandra. Both teams have $750 budget. Red Team did Lamb Skewers with Yogurt Sauce, Aroncini Balls, Toffee Apples, Caramelized Pineapple Skewers. Blue Team did Lamb Kofta with Yogurt Relish, Mushroom Risotto. Blue team made $926.50. Red team made $1251.50. Winner: Red Team	1,338,000	6th	(1,318,000) 21st
28/05-5	Thursday 28 May 2009	Team Elimination – At elimination, Sandra and Kate both received three votes, Sandra for her service and Kate for her lack of cooking skills and leadership qualities. Kate, being the team leader, decided to vote herself out to pursue a pastry apprenticeship outside MasterChef.	1,219,000	4th	(1,318,000) 21st
29/05-6	Friday 29 May 2009	Masterclass 4 – The perfect chip – Snapper in a Bag and Chunky Chips, Risotto with Pumpkin and Goat's Cheese, Rib Eye Steak with Red Wine Sauce and Spinach	1,239,000	4th	(1,318,000) 21st
Week 6
30/06-1	Sunday 31 May 2009	Mystery Box Challenge: The contestants had to make cupcakes, whose recipes have been given to them, but the decorations and flavouring was up to them. They also had to name their creations. The Top 3 were Poh, Julie and Chris, and Julie won with her lemon diva cupcakes. Invention Test 4 – British theme. There was an additional judge, John Torode of MasterChef UK. Julie's choice of ingredients was between blue-eyed trevalla, strawberries, or lamb legs. She chose the lamb and had five minutes to choose the rest of her ingredients from the pantry. The other contestants got 2 minutes to select no more than ten ingredients. Top three: Chris, Justine, Tom. Winner: Justine for her lamb roulade. Bottom three: Aaron, Sandra and Julie.	1,565,000	3rd	8th
31/06-2	Monday 1 June 2009	Pressure Test Elimination – Aaron, Sandra and Julie faced elimination and had to make paella. Sandra produced the best dish, while Aaron's overconfidence saw him neglecting to taste, and hence, did not achieve a correct balance of spices. Ultimately, he was sent home.	1,473,000	2nd	(1,359,000) 16th
32/06-3	Tuesday 2 June 2009	Celebrity Chef Challenge 5 -Justine competes with Guy Grossi of Grossi Florentino making one of his signature dishes, Lobster with Russian salad. She has an hour and thirty minutes, he has an hour. The judges give Justine 7/7/6 and Grossi 7/7/7 out of ten. Winner: Guy Grossi beat Justine.	1,278,000	8th	(1,359,000) 16th
33/06-4	Wednesday 3 June 2009	Fresh Seafood Team Challenge - The task of the day is to prepare a three-course meal to be served at the flying fish restaurant. Team captains are Justine (Red Team) for winning the Invention Test. She picks Trevor for Blue Team captain. Justine picks Chris, Tom, Julie, Lucas, Sandra and Trevor picks Andre, Sam, Poh, Geni. Both teams have to catch the seafood themselves. Red Team did zucchini flowers with fish mousse, pan-fried Leatherjackets and poached pear with chantilly cream. Blue Team did Leatherjacket potato salad with avocado and squid, Pan-seared blue morwong with baked witlof and macerated strawberries with zabaglione. Winner: Red Team	1,485,000	3rd	(1,359,000) 16th
34/06-5	Thursday 4 June 2009	Team Elimination – Sam was scolded by the judges for producing the worst of the dishes of the Blue Team and Trevor was criticised for his choice to use bait as ingredients for the meal. In the end, Trevor voted for Sam, but Trevor's choice to use the bait, which made the food "taste like the bottom of a boat," was enough to see him have the majority of votes to send him home.	1,237,000	4th	(1,359,000) 16th
35/06-6	Friday 5 June 2009	Masterclass 5 – Lemon Goodness – Lobster Linguine, Tuscan Vegetable Soup, Roast Chicken with Buttery Potatoes, Lemon Diva cupcakes.	1,217,000	4th	(1,359,000) 16th
Week 7
36/07-1	Sunday 7 June 2009	Invention Test 5 – Just when the contestants were getting the hang of the MasterChef kitchen, they were thrown a curve ball. Instead of a mystery box, they faced a taste test, and the contestant who correctly guessed the most ingredients of the dish won an advantage in the invention test. Chris and Tom were tied 12-12, but Chris won in a tiebreaker. All ten contestants were split into pairs and were challenged to prepare a two-course meal. Lucas and Justine ended up winning the challenge, while Tom, Poh, Chris and Julie were sent to the pressure test.	1,427,000	2nd	11th
37/07-2	Monday 8 June 2009	Pressure Test Elimination – Tom, Poh, Chris and Julie had to make Adrian Zumbo's croquembouche. Despite an unsettling start, Poh went on to produce the best dish. Julie came in second, leaving Tom and Chris in the bottom, and Tom was eliminated.	1,802,000	2nd	(1,474,000) 8th
38/07-3	Tuesday 9 June 2009	Celebrity Chef Challenge 6 – Lucas beat Ben O'Donoghue	1,357,000	8th	(1,474,000) 8th
39/07-4	Wednesday 10 June 2009	Martini Club Team Challenge – Winner: Red Team	1,509,000	3rd	(1,474,000) 8th
40/07-5	Thursday 11 June 2009	Team Elimination – Geni was the team's top performer with most of the guests stating her Fig and Duck Lady Cigars was "the best dish all night", whilst Andre and Sandra were criticised, Sandra for not aiding enough and Andre for producing the worst dish. In the vote, Poh and Andre voted for Sandra, but Geni became the decider, and with "a heavy heart" she voted out friend Sandra as she believed "she belonged with her family."	1,323,000	4th	(1,474,000) 8th
41/07-6	Friday 12 June 2009	Masterclass 6 – Sweet treats – Feta Blini with Smoked Beetroot, John Dory on the Bone with Vegetables, Coffee éclairs with Vanilla Cream Filling	1,246,000	4th	(1,474,000) 8th
Week 8
42/08-1	Sunday 14 June 2009	Invention Test 6 – Two-course meal	1,962,000	1st	1st
43/08-2	Monday 15 June 2009	Pressure Test Elimination – Geni, Poh and Andre were in the bottom three and had to make salmon terrine. Again, Poh produced the best dish of the three. Geni, whose thumb was injured, could not cope and produced the worst dish, and she was eliminated.	1,728,000	2nd	(1,619,000) 5th
44/08-3	Tuesday 16 June 2009	Celebrity Chef Challenge 7 – Matt Moran beat Justine	1,467,000	6th	(1,619,000) 5th
45/08-4	Wednesday 17 June 2009	Wedding Challenge – Sam and Poh were up for elimination.	1,883,000	1st	(1,619,000) 5th
46/08-5	Thursday 18 June 2009	Taste Test Elimination – Poh and Sam had to name ingredients in a pot of minestrone. Poh incorrectly guessed 'barley' and she was eliminated.	1,399,000	3rd	(1,619,000) 5th
47/08-6	Friday 19 June 2009	Masterclass 7 – Cocktail hour – Kingfish Skewers with Zucchini Salad, Piña Colada, Prawn Saganaki, Raspberry Tart	1,309,000	4th	(1,619,000) 5th
Week 9
48/09-1	Sunday 21 June 2009	Hong Kong – Arrival/Dim Sum Challenge	1,934,000	1st	2nd
49/09-2	Monday 22 June 2009	Hong Kong – High Tea/Rainbow Fish Challenge	1,781,000	2nd	(1,666,000) 4th
50/09-3	Tuesday 23 June 2009	Celebrity Chef Challenge 8 – Tam Kin Pak beat Julie	1,596,000	2nd	(1,666,000) 4th
51/09-4	Wednesday 24 June 2009	Hong Kong – Mystery Steamer Challenge and Super Challenge – Chris won the mystery steamer challenge and was given immunity from the Hong Kong super challenge. He chose to pair up Andre and Sam with Justine and Julie pairing up as well. Andre and Sam ended up being successful in preparing their three-course meal, sending Julie and Justine to the pressure test.	1,852,000	2nd	(1,666,000) 4th
52/09-5	Thursday 25 June 2009	Pressure Test Elimination – Justine and Julie landed in the bottom 2 and had to cook a sweet and sour duck with ho fun noodles. Despite being a frontrunner, Justine produced the worst dish and was eliminated.	1,524,000	2nd	(1,666,000) 4th
53/09-6	Friday 26 June 2009	Masterclass 8 – Fried Rice, Hot Salami Pizza, Seared Scallops with Braised Pork Belly, Lemon and Date Scones	1,380,000	3rd	(1,666,000) 4th
Week 10
54/10-1	Sunday 28 June 2009	Invention Test 7 – Three-course meal, 'Romance' theme – No contestants were up for elimination. Andre succeeded in both the mystery box Challenge and the invention test and he competed in the Celebrity Chef Challenge.	1,891,000	1st	1st
55/10-2	Monday 29 June 2009	Dream Restaurant Challenge – In a season twist, no one went home. Instead of a pressure test, all contestants cooked for the chance to meet and dine with three winners of the coveted "Chef of the Year" award.	1,669,000	3rd	(1,576,000) 7th
56/10-3	Tuesday 30 June 2009	Celebrity Chef Challenge 9 – Emmanuel Stroobant beat Andre	1,465,000	7th	(1,576,000) 7th
57/10-4	Wednesday 1 July 2009	HMAS Kanimbla Challenge – Poh, Justine and Tom returned to the competition, while Sam and Tom were up for elimination.	1,718,000	1st	(1,576,000) 7th
58/10-5	Thursday 2 July 2009	Taste Test Elimination – Tom and Sam had to guess ingredients, and Tom incorrectly guessed "thyme.", which resulted in his elimination.	1,442,000	3rd	(1,576,000) 7th
59/10-6	Friday 3 July 2009	Masterclass 9 – Crepes Suzette, Twice Baked Cheese Souffle, Braised Lamb Shanks, Open Beef Kofta	1,434,000	2nd	(1,576,000) 7th
Week 11
60/11-1	Sunday 5 July 2009	Invention Test 8 – 'Christmas in July' theme	1,979,000	1st	1st
61/11-2	Monday 6 July 2009	Pressure Test Elimination – Sam, Poh, Chris and Andre had to cook a combination of panna cotta, passionfruit emulsion ("passionfruit slick") and filled macaroon biscuits. Poh made the best dish, followed by Chris, while Andre and Sam struggled. Sam failed to produce adequate biscuits and only Andre's panna cotta was up to the judge's standards. Despite achieving 2 out of 3 of the requirements for the dish at a fair standard, Sam's mediocre dish was not enough to save him and he was sent home.	1,804,000	1st	(1,686,000) 4th
62/11-3	Tuesday 7 July 2009	Celebrity Chef Challenge 10 – Adrian Richardson beat Julie	1,664,000	2nd	(1,686,000) 4th
63/11-4	Wednesday 8 July 2009	Matt Preston's Formal Dinner Challenge – The contestants had to cook for a dinner party hosted by Matt Preston for four leaders of the Australian food industry: Armando Percuoco, Margaret Fulton, Jacques Reymond and Cheong Liew. The five of them assessed the contestants' dishes, with the two worst performers being nominated for elimination. Justine won with 47/50 for her duck dish, Julie came in second with her spiced orange layer cake scoring 45/50, with Poh third with 42/50 for her floss curry and coconut laced crepes. Chris and Andre were the worst two performers. Chris scored lowest with 33/50 for his steak, and Andre 37/50 for his gnocchi.	1,924,000	1st	(1,686,000) 4th
64/11-5	Thursday 9 July 2009	Taste Test Elimination – Andre and Chris had to guess ingredients in a pot of Sri Lankan curry. After reaching the halfway point, Andre struggled and guessed "curry powder". It was not in the dish, and Andre was eliminated.	1,550,000	1st	(1,686,000) 4th
65/11-6	Friday 10 July 2009	Master Class 10 – Pork and Fennel Sausages with Baked Beans, Roast Salmon and Artichokes with Red Wine Sauce, Chocolate Cigar with Sabayon	1,392,000	2nd	(1,686,000) 4th
Week 12 – Finals Week
66/12-1	Sunday 12 July 2009	Invention Test 9 – In the first challenge of Finals Week, the contestants were asked to cook a meal under ten dollars using ingredients bought from the pantry that was converted into a supermarket. Only Julia and Poh impressed the judges while the other contestants were given harsh criticism for making dishes that were too simple (Julie and Lucas both made Potato and Leek Soup, Chris a French Onion Soup and Justine with a Roasted Bell Pepper Omelette) and also failed to have the "refined" level of taste for MasterChef Finals Week. Julia won the challenge and chose the core ingredient for the invention test: goat. In the end, Justine, Julia and Chris pleased the judges with their goat dishes. Despite their dishes being deemed the best two, Julia and Justine had minor flaws (burnt pastry, overcooked goat respectively) and for this, Chris was ultimately deemed the winner. For his prize, he was given a view of the dish they were to cook in the Mystery Box eliminator challenge the next day, thereby giving him an advantage over the other contestants to plan his dish.	1,978,000	1st	2nd
67/12-2	Monday 13 July 2009	Elimination Challenge 1 – The contestants had to make two pies – one sweet and one savoury, making their own pastry. Almost all the contestants struggled to make time, with only Poh and Chris being able to prepare both their pies to a suitable standard before judging. In the end, Lucas was criticised for neglecting to use "the most simple seasoning" – salt, and was also scolded for his poor presentations of both his pies. Julia was applauded for her pastry but heavily chastised for leaving part of her pies uncooked. Chris was commended for his surprising Fish Pie and Lime Tart while Justine was faced strong criticism for failing to balance the filling, which the judges praised, with suitable pastry. Julie was reprimanded by the judges for her "Puddle Pie" which the judges deemed as one of the worst, however, they believed that her other pie, a Chicken and Mushroom pie was up to a suitable standard. Poh produced two pies that were deemed as some of the best visually; guest Judge Luke deemed her vegetable and blue cheese pie the best, while all the judges favoured her rhubarb, hazelnut and chocolate 'open sandwich' pie. After discussion, the judges deemed Lucas, Julia and Julie as producing some of the worst pies in the bunch. They chose to spare Julia first as they believed her Chocolate Pie was stronger, then chose Julie as she produced one good pie whilst Lucas produced two poor ones. Lucas was the first finalist sent home. The judges then deemed Poh, Justine and Chris as the Top 3 and chose Poh for her presentation and for producing the best tasting pies of the finalist and her ability to "modernise" the pie theme; the use of hazelnut, chocolate and rhubarb in a pie, Matt highlighted as never having been done with success until now. She, like Chris was given an advantage: to choose the theme for the following eliminator.	2,119,000	1st	(2,193,000) 1st
68/12-3	Tuesday 14 July 2009	Elimination Challenge 2 – As Poh had won the pie challenge she designated Malaysian as the theme and picked coconut cream and ling fish for the core ingredients. The contestants had 90 minutes to make two courses. Guest judge Matt Moran told Chris he had been following his progress during the competition and thought some of his dishes had been brilliant. However, at this stage he'd expect Chris' food to be better; his ling fried rice dish didn't appeal to Matt whatsoever. George said Chris' pannacotta was too hard. Gary said Poh's petai with sambal and fish custard was a fresh and vibrant dish. George thought it was interesting and tasty. Matt said her dessert of glutenous rice dumpling with coconut pandan leaf stuffing didn't look appealing but its flavour packed a punch. Gary told an upset Julia that the fish in her Malaysian broth was raw. Matt said the broth was too intense with no connection to Malaysian food and the fish wasn't cooked enough. Matt said he had been worried about the use of zucchini and udon noodles in Julie's vegetable coconut curry because it wasn't Malay but he could taste some nice Malaysian flavours in the dish. Gary told Julie the ling which she had served with peanut sauce wasn't cooked properly. Gary said the sauce of her fish dish was good, with a nice depth of flavour. George told Justine her sauce was zippy, gutsy and he loved the colour. Matt thought Justine's rice pudding was delicious. The judges told the contestants Justine and Poh had made the best meals, with Poh the winner of the challenge. Matt told Poh her dessert was the "killer" dish of the day. Chris, Julia and Julie had made the worst dishes. Chris was told he was safe and then Julia was eliminated. As the winner of the challenge Poh was again given an advantage for the following challenge. She was able to see and taste the pressure test dish the contestants will cook in the next challenge and was given the recipe to study overnight.	2,191,000	1st	(2,193,000) 1st
69/12-4	Wednesday 15 July 2009	Elimination Challenge 3 – The third elimination challenge emulated the pressure test challenge where the contestants had to make a several layered 'Chocolate Mousse' cake. In the end, Julie was the only contestant who managed to add all the decorations to the dish and Chris was the finalist deemed to have produced the best cake. Poh and Justine both struggled and the judges were shown to have a difficult time deciding. Guest judge Bill Granger praised Poh's superb palette whilst he also favoured Justine's technical abilities. Ultimately, the judges considered Poh's effort to be slightly better and Justine was the next finalist to leave in a teary elimination.	2,231,000	1st	(2,193,000) 1st
70/12-5	Thursday 16 July 2009	Elimination Challenge 4 – The final elimination round before the final saw the contestants cooking the dishes they would include in self-authored recipe books with cookbook writer Donna Hay acting as the guest judge. Poh chose a traditional Chinese Malaysian style book that would include unusual, exotic recipes while Chris' book included hearty meals that utilised beer, and sought to fulfil a "snout to tail" approach to cooking animals. Julie's idea was a home recipe cookbook that would inspire other families. This impressed Donna Hay greatly and she stated that she wished to "steal (the idea)." In the end, Poh's dishes impressed the judges with presentation and taste, despite being described as "acquired," and was deemed the best of the three. She was then given a place in the Finals while Julie and Chris landed in the Bottom 2. Julie struggled due to her poor time management which saw her unable to complete any of her dishes while Chris's completed dishes were not visually accepted by Donna Hay and in the main disappointed taste-wise. Ultimately, what Julie had managed to cook coupled with her cook-book idea was enough to save her and Chris was subsequently eliminated.	2,360,000	1st	(2,193,000) 1st
71/12-6	Friday 17 July 2009	Masterclass Reunion – The Top 20 contestants were reunited in the final masterclass and revealed what they have been up to since leaving the show. Poh and Julie also challenged George and Gary to a Mystery Box Challenge.	1,950,000	1st	(2,193,000) 1st
Finale
72/13-1	Sunday 19 July 2009	Finale Night – Poh and Julie competed against each other in three rounds consisting of a Taste Test, an Invention Test and a Pressure Test. Points would be earned for each test, with the winner decided based on the final tally after the three tests. The Taste Test featured a beef bourguignon, with Julie naming 12 correct ingredients versus Poh's 11. The Invention Test pitted Poh's Hainanese chicken rice against Julie's sage and garlic chicken. The Pressure Test involved the finalists recreating a chocolate tasting plate, a signature dish by Matt Moran.	3,313,000	2nd	2nd
72/13-1	Sunday 19 July 2009	Winner Announced – Julie was announced as the winner, beating Poh on overall points (82 to Poh's 75).	3,745,000	1st	1st

== Allegations of vote rigging ==
Large numbers of viewers have raised allegations that the voting on the series one finale of MasterChef was fraudulent after Julie Goodwin won the crown. After the show talkback radio had been inundated with calls, both for and against the verdict, and the finale also became a top trending topic on social networking site Twitter, where many users said they felt "deflated" and "ripped off" by the final episode of the hit show. Similar allegations were raised when contestants were eliminated throughout the series. Judge Matt Preston has denied that eliminations were rigged or the result of a popularity contest, and asserted that Julie had won the title because she was the better cook on the night. Goodwin herself has also asserted that her victory was not the result of rigging, insisting that the professional integrity of the three judges would be damaged if it was.

New television show	MasterChef Australia series 27 April 2009 – 19 July 2009	Succeeded by Celebrity MasterChef Australia
