= Reality Check (Australian TV series) =

- Presented by: Tom Ballard
- Country of origin: Australia
- Original language: English
- No. of episodes: 8

Production
- Executive producer: Cordell Jigsaw Zaprude
- Camera setup: Multi-camera
- Running time: 30 minutes

Original release
- Network: ABC1 (Repeats broadcast on ABC2)
- Release: 13 August 2014

Reality Check is an Australian television panel discussion program focusing on reality television which debuted on ABC1 on 13 August 2014. The program is hosted by Tom Ballard with a panel of three guests who are industry experts, behind the scenes producers, judges or former contestants to reflect on their experiences. It is produced by Cordell Jigsaw Zapruder, who also produced panel show The Gruen Transfer, which dissected the advertising industry.

== Episodes ==
#	Guests	This week in reality...	Tricks of the Trade...
1	Marion Farrelly, Julie Goodwin, and Andrew Shaw	The Voice Kids and The Bachelor	'The Verdict' - Masterchef season 1 final versus Masterchef season 6 finale
2	Marion Farrelly, Amity Dry, and Ian Dickson	The Block and Brynne: My Bedazzled Diary	'Get people talking' - Susan Boyle's first audition on Britains Got Talent
3	Marion Farrelly, Ryan Fitzgerald, and Andrew Shaw	The Amazing Race and X-Factor	'Politics' - Merlin refuses to speak after being evicted from Big Brother
4	Marion Farrelly Adam Liaw, and Ian Dickson	Big Brother and The Recruit	'How to be Ethnically Diverse' - How do MasterChef and The Block approach multiculturalism?
5	Julian Cress, Sheridan Wright, and Andrew Shaw	Utopia, Living with the Enemy and Bringing Sexy Back	'Challenges' - What makes a good challenge?
6	Peter Abbott, Poh Ling Yeow, and Ian Dickson	Big Brother and Married at First Sight	'Judges' - How do you make good TV when your job is to say 'yes' or 'no'?
7	Marion Farrelly, Rob Mills, and Andrew Shaw	The Bachelor	'Kids on TV' - How do Young Talent Time, The Voice Kids and X-Factor deal with kids?
8	Marion Farrelly, Julian Cress, and Ian Dickson	Dancing with the Stars and Big Brother	'Scandal' - Can you cheat The Block? Is killing a relative on Survivor ever a good idea? And just what is a turkey slap?
