= Callum Hann =

Australian chef (born 1989)

- Born: 1989 (age 36–37); Angaston, South Australia, Australia
- Occupations: Restaurateur; Television chef Author
- Years active: 2010–present
- Agent: www.onemanagement.com.au/callumhann
- Television: MasterChef Australia
- Title: Winner, MasterChef Australia All-Stars
- Board member of: Brand SA
- Spouse: Crystal Jagger
- Children: 3
- Website: callumhann.com.au

Callum Hann is an Australian chef, restaurateur, television personality and cookbook author. He has appeared on four series and spinoffs of MasterChef Australia.

Hann is the co-owner of several restaurants, as well as a cooking school. He has written three cookbooks.

== Early life ==
Callum Hann was born c. 1989 in South Australia. He grew up and attended school in Nuriootpa. As of 2020, his mother and sister still lived there. His father worked for 27 years in the winemaking industry, while his mother worked in a homewares shop. Hann studied sports engineering at the University of Adelaide prior to entering MasterChef Australia.

== Career ==
=== MasterChef ===
Hann first appeared on MasterChef Australia series 2 in 2010 at the age of 20. He reached the finale on 25 July 2010, finishing second to winner Adam Liaw. Hann was awarded paid work experience at the restaurants of MasterChef Australia judge George Calombaris, plus $10,000 living expenses. The finale was viewed by more than 5.7 million Australians, making it the most-watched non-sporting event since Australian TV ratings began.

Hann next appeared on MasterChef Australia All-Stars in 2012, competing against 11 other returning contestants. He won the finale on 19 August 2012, defeating Chris Badenoch and Kate Bracks, and winning $20,000 for his chosen charity Cancer Council Australia.

In 2020, MasterChef Australia series 12 was re-badged as MasterChef Australia: Back to Win and featured 24 returning contestants from the previous 11 years. The series introduced new judges Andy Allen, Melissa Leong and Jock Zonfrillo, replacing outgoing judges George Calombaris, Gary Mehigan and Matt Preston. Hann was eliminated on 14 July 2020, finishing fourth.

Hann came runner-up in MasterChef Australia series 17, which again follows the Back to Win format with 24 returning contestants who are mainly professional chefs.

=== Restaurateur and instructor ===
In 2011, Hann and his business partner Themis Chryssidis opened Sprout Cooking School (now Sprout Training), offering cooking instruction to industry and home cooks. The Sprout Group followed with three restaurants: Lou's Place in Nuriootpa in 2020, Eleven Restaurant (now Roma) in 2021, and Olive in 2024, the last two in Adelaide.

Hann is a board member of Brand SA.

=== Author and television ===
Hann has written three cookbooks:

- Quick. Easy. Healthy. : good food every day ISBN 9781952533600 (2016)
- I'd eat that! : simple ways to be a better cook ISBN 9781743360187 (2014)
- The starter kitchen : learn how to love to cook ISBN 9781742667935 (2012)

Hann is also a presenter on Discover, a travel and lifestyle television program on Seven Adelaide.

== Personal life ==
Hann is married to Crystal Jagger. She is a designer of sleepwear and cutting boards, and a pizza restaurant owner. The couple met in 2015 and married in 2018. They have three children: daughters born in 2020 and 2025, and a son born in 2022. Jagger did not expect to fall pregnant as she has polyendocrine metabolic ovarian syndrome (PMOS).
