= Max TV (disambiguation) =

Max TV is a former New Zealand music TV channel.

Max TV may also refer to:

- Akta, a Romanian telecommunications company, formerly known as Max TV
- Cinemax, a television channel
- MAXtv, a Croatian television service of Hrvatski Telekom
- You TV, a Sri Lankan television channel, formerly known as Max TV
