= Sofia Levin =

Australian food journalist

- Born: Australia
- Occupations: Food journalist; food critic; travel writer; blogger; television host
- Employer: Network 10
- Known for: MasterChef Australia host & judge

Sofia Levin is an Australian food journalist, food critic, television host and travel writer best known for being a judge on MasterChef Australia. She also writes a food blog and newsletter The Seasoned Traveller.

== Early life ==
Levin's passion for food writing started when she was 19 years old. She studied psychology and journalism at university in Melbourne and became a published food and travel journalist before she graduated.

== Career ==
Levin's first hired job was writing reviewer for Good Food Guide. She spent the first 15 years of her career writing food and travel reviews for publications such as Lonely Planet, National Geographic, The Guardian and SBS Food.

In 2020, Levin starting writing her own newsletter titled The Seasoned Traveller. A website under the same name was launched in March 2021, including categories of food write-ups from around the world.

In October 2023, Network 10 announced that Levin was joining MasterChef Australia as a host and judge from 2024, replacing Melissa Leong. She joins fellow newcomers Poh Ling Yeow and Jean-Christophe Novelli, and returning judge Andy Allen. She returned for her second season in 2025.

== Personal life ==
Levin was previously engaged to Matt John from 2016.
