= Chef Academy =

2009 American TV series

- Genre: Reality television
- Starring: Jean Christophe Novelli
- Country of origin: United States
- Original language: English
- No. of seasons: 1
- No. of episodes: 9

Production
- Executive producers: Greg Johnston; Hannah Wyatt; Dan Barraclough
- Camera setup: Multiple
- Running time: 42 minutes
- Production company: Mentorn USA

Original release
- Network: Bravo
- Release: November 16, 2009 – January 11, 2010

Chef Academy is a reality television series which premiered on November 16, 2009, on Bravo and ran for nine episodes until November 1, 2010. The show followed Jean Christophe Novelli, a chef with restaurants in London, France and South Africa. On the show, he opened a test program for a culinary institute in Los Angeles.

== Contestants ==
There were nine students competing in Chef Academy. Names, ages, and hometowns below are from the Bravo website.

- Carissa Loughhead, 26 – Charlotte, North Carolina
- Emmanuel DelCour, 27 – Bordeaux, France and residing in Venice, California
- Kyle Daley, 29 – Salt Lake City, Utah and residing in San Diego, California
- Kyle Kupiszewski (Kup), 27 – Allentown, Pennsylvania
- Leonard Goodloe (Leo), 28 – San Antonio, T.X.
- Sarah Jacobsen, 28 – Wheeling, Illinois
- Suzanne Winn, 47 – Mission Viejo, California
- Tracie Norfleet, 46 – Venice, California
- Zoe Feigenbaum, 26 – New York, N.Y.

Although Chef Academy never had a true winner of the show, Kyle Daley was announced Best Chef of Chef Academy. It was announced on the final episode of the season.

The series gained some attention with respect to contestant Emmanuel DelCour, who was described as being a graphic designer and having studied graphic design for five years in Bordeaux, France. Over the course of the show, his possible identity as an adult film performer, under the name Jean Val Jean, was discerned by his fellow competitors, which the network then capitalized on.

== Format ==
The students are assessed weekly tests varying from preparing desserts to gutting a fish or usually recreating one of Novelli's dishes. At the end of the test, Novelli determines who passes and who fails. If a student fails three tests, they are dismissed from his Academy.

== Location ==
The building used to house the academy is 1304 Abbot Kinney Boulevard, Venice, CA.

== Contestant table ==
Episode	2	3^{2}	4^{3}	5	6^{4}	7	8	9^{5}
Carissa	✗	✓	✓	✓	✗	✓	✓	PASS
Emmanuel	✓	✗	✓	✗	✓	✓	✓	PASS
Kup	✗	✓	✓	✓	✓	✓	✓	PASS
Kyle	✗	✓	✓	✓	✓	✓	✓	PASS
Leo	✓	✓	✓	✓	✓	✗	✓	PASS
Sarah	✗	✓	✗	✓	✗	✓	✓	PASS
Tracie	✗	✓	✓	✗	✓	✓	✓	PASS
Zoe	✓	✓	✗	✗	✓	✓	✓	PASS
Suzanne	✓	✗	✗	✓	✗	✓	FAIL	

Notes

^{1} The students who failed the first episode did not count as their first failure.
^{2} Chef Novelli did not reveal the results for all the chefs except for the three who performed the best (Zoe, Kyle, and Kup) who were invited to join him at a beach party.
^{3} The chefs who passed each made a croque-em-bouche for extra credit. Tracie was declared 'Head of the Class' because she impressed Chef Novelli the most this week.
^{4} Although both Sarah and Suzanne received their third failures, Chef Novelli decided to give them another chance.
^{5} Although Suzanne had failed the Chef Academy, Chef Novelli asked her back for Episode 9 to host the gala for the final challenge.

Key

✓ The student passed that episode's test
✗ The student failed that episode's test
(FAIL) The student received three strikes and failed Chef Academy
(PASS) The student passed Chef Academy

== Episodes ==
No.	Title	Original release date
1	"Coming to America"	November 16, 2009
2	"Just Desserts"	November 23, 2009
3	"Basic Training"	November 30, 2009
4	"A Bun in the Oven"	December 7, 2009
5	"Naked Lunch"	December 14, 2009
6	"Squid Pro Quo"	January 4, 2010
7	"Meat Your Maker"	January 4, 2010
8	"Too Many Cooks"	January 11, 2010
9	"The Last Supper"	January 11, 2010
