= Beat the Chef (Australian TV series) =

Australian television series

Beat The Chef is a television show shown on ABC-TV in Australia. It is a part game show part cooking show where two contestants cook a meal out of strange ingredients within 25 minute time limit. This show was influenced by the world-popular Japanese cooking show Iron Chef.

Poh Ling Yeow made her television debut on the show in 2005.

The show was cancelled in 2006.

== See also ==
- List of Australian television series
- List of cooking shows
