= Justine Schofield =

Australian cook, author and television presenter (born 1985)

- Born: 29 October 1985 (age 41); Sydney, New South Wales, Australia
- Occupations: Cook; author; television presenter
- Years active: 2009–present
- Agent: One Management
- Television: Everyday Gourmet with Justine Schofield
- Partner: Brent Staker
- Children: 1
- Website: www.justineschofield.com.au

Justine Schofield (born 29 October 1985) is an Australian cook, author and television presenter.

== Early life ==
Schofield was born on 29 October 1985 in Sydney to an Australian father and a French mother. She has an elder brother. When her mother came to Australia, she opened a restaurant in Bowral. Schofield attended Santa Sabina College where she gained her Higher School Certificate in 2003. She studied for a diploma in hotel management and went on to work in sales.

== Television ==
In 2009, Schofield was selected for the first series of MasterChef Australia. She was eliminated in fourth place.

Schofield was subsequently offered her own program, Everyday Gourmet with Justine Schofield, which first aired on Network Ten in 2011. As of 2026, she has recorded more than 1000 episodes of the show over sixteen series. The program also has spinoff series, including Tropical Gourmet Queensland, Tropical Gourmet: New Caledonia and Justine's Flavours of Fuji.

In 2019, Schofield competed in the fifth season of I'm a Celebrity...Get Me Out of Here!, set in Kruger National Park, South Africa. She was eliminated eighth on 7 February 2019.

== Books ==
Schofield has written several books:

- The Slow Cook (2021) ISBN 9781760780555
- The Weeknight Cookbook (2019) ISBN 9781760780548
- Simple Every Day (2017) ISBN 9781743548431
- Dinner with Justine (2016) ISBN 9781743538951

== Personal life ==
From 2014 to 2017, Schofield was in a relationship with television journalist Matt Doran. In 2019, she said she had been single for two years. Schofield has been in a relationship with ex-AFL player Brent Staker since early 2020. On 8 May 2022, the couple announced that they were expecting a child. They had a son in September 2022.

Schofield lives in Clovelly, New South Wales.
