= MasterChef Australia =

Cooking reality television series

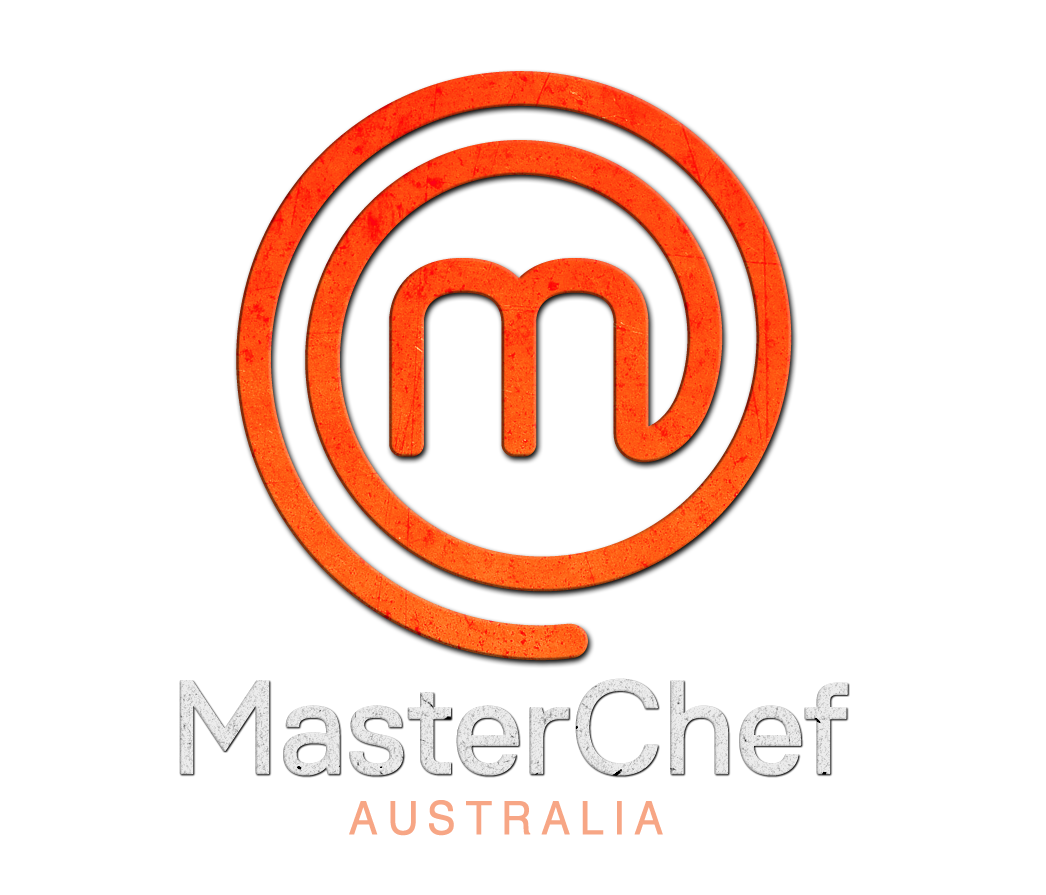
- Genre: Cooking
- Created by: Frank Roddam
- Directed by: Richard Franc
- Presented by: Sarah Wilson (Note: Wilson hosted series 1. Subsequent series are hosted by the judges.)
- Judges: George Calombaris; Gary Mehigan; Matt Preston; Matt Moran; Andy Allen; Melissa Leong; Jock Zonfrillo; Poh Ling Yeow; Jean-Christophe Novelli; Sofia Levin
- Narrated by: Nicholas McKay; Graeme Stone; Lofty Fulton
- Opening theme: "Hot n Cold" by Katy Perry (2009–2022); "Burning Up" (international, 2009–2022); None (2023–)
- Composers: Dinesh Wicks; Adam Gock; Anthony Ammar
- Country of origin: Australia
- Original language: English
- No. of series: 18
- No. of episodes: 1,091

Production
- Executive producers: David Forster; Marty Benson; Adam Fergusson
- Production locations: Sydney (2009–12); Melbourne (2013–present)
- Running time: 30–120 minutes
- Production companies: FremantleMedia Australia (2009–10); Endemol Shine Australia (2011–)

Original release
- Network: Network 10
- Release: 27 April 2009 – present

Related
- Celebrity MasterChef Australia; Junior MasterChef Australia; MasterChef Australia All-Stars; MasterChef Australia: The Professionals; Dessert Masters

MasterChef Australia is an Australian competitive cooking reality show based on the original British MasterChef. It is produced by Endemol Shine Australia and screens on Network 10.

Restaurateur and chef Gary Mehigan, chef George Calombaris and food critic Matt Preston served as the show's original hosts and judges until 2019, when they were replaced by Series 4 winner and chef Andy Allen, food critic Melissa Leong, and restaurateur and chef Jock Zonfrillo. After Zonfrillo's sudden death and Leong's departure, Allen was joined by Series 1 runner-up Poh Ling Yeow, food writer Sofia Levin and French chef Jean-Christophe Novelli.

The series has also spawned five spin-off series: Celebrity MasterChef Australia, which featured celebrity contestants, Junior MasterChef Australia, which featured younger contestants, MasterChef Australia All-Stars, which featured returning contestants from the first three series, MasterChef Australia: The Professionals, which featured professional chefs as contestants, and Dessert Masters, which featured professional pastry chefs.

== Format ==
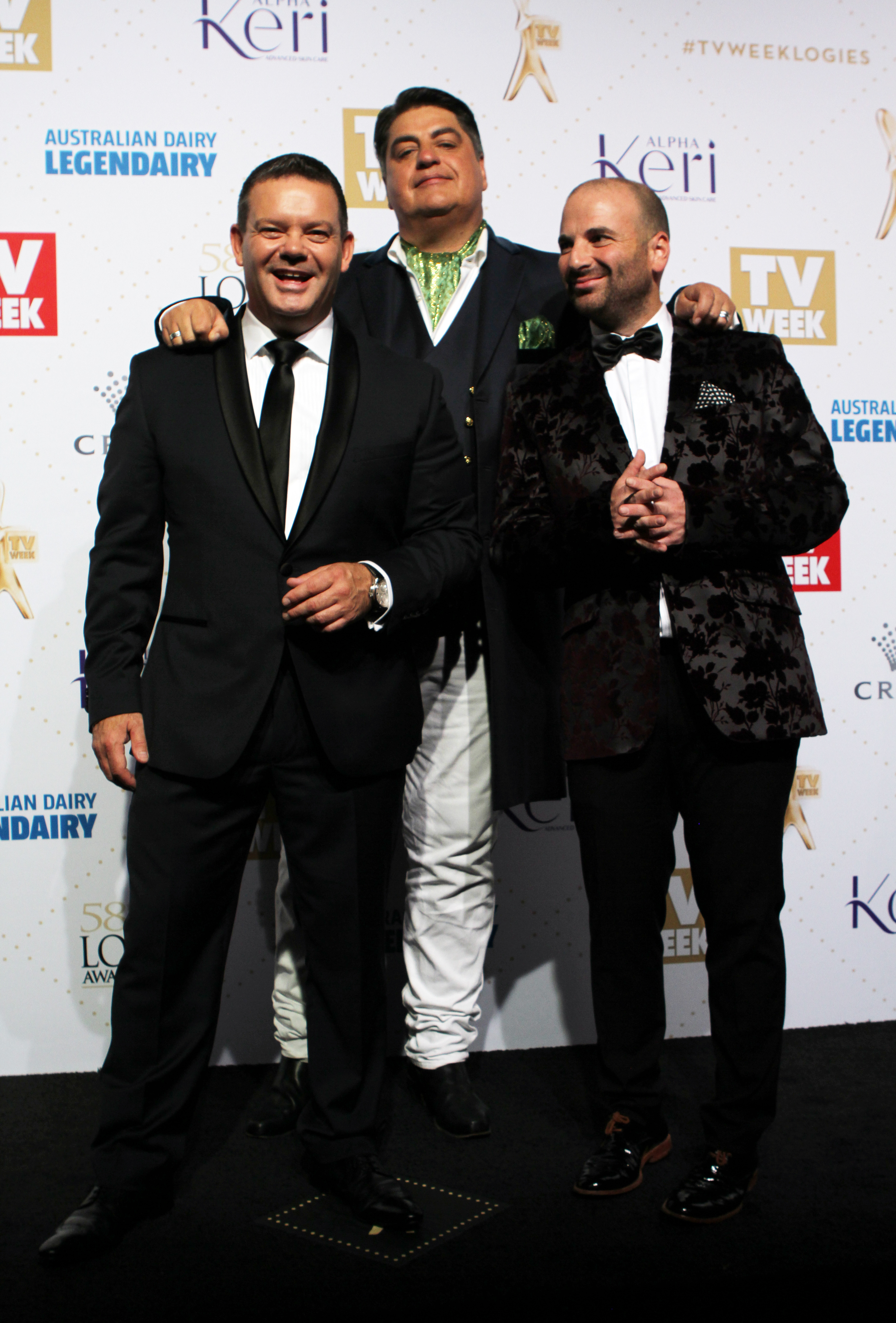
The original judges: (L to R) Gary Mehigan, Matt Preston, and George Calombaris

MasterChef Australia has a different format from that of the original British MasterChef and MasterChef Goes Large formats. Initial rounds consist of a large number of hopeful contestants from across Australia individually "auditioning" by presenting a food dish before the three judges in order to gain one of 50 semi-final places. Entrants must be over 18 years old and their main source of income cannot come from preparing and cooking fresh food in a professional environment.

The semi-finalists then compete in several challenges that test their food knowledge and preparation skills. In series 1, the top 50 competed until 20 were left, with the final 20 progressing to the main stage of the show. From series 2 onwards, 24 contestants progress. The contestants will then be whittled down through a number of individual and team-based cooking challenges and weekly elimination rounds until a winning MasterChef is crowned. The winner plays for a prize that includes chef training from leading professional chefs, the chance to have their own cookbook published, and A$250,000 in cash.

=== Episodes ===
MasterChef Australia airs five nights a week from Sunday to Thursday. Each night features a different episode format, however some episodes modify the format slightly. The typical episode formats are as follows:

Sunday is the Challenge night. From series 3, it can range from a variety of challenges, including a Mystery Box, where each contestant is given the same box of ingredients and are to create a dish using only those ingredients. The judges then pick three dishes based on technique and visual appearance alone and a winner is chosen. There can also be an Invention Test, where contestants have to invent a dish relevant to a theme using a core ingredient. There can also be Off-Site Challenges and Team Challenges, which often involve cooking for large numbers of people. The top three contestants who made the best dishes are selected by the judges, from which a winner is chosen to compete in the Immunity Challenge. After this the bottom three are revealed, who will face off in an elimination challenge the next night. In the first two series, it would always consist of a Mystery Box, where the winner was able to choose the core ingredient for the Invention Test.

Monday episodes feature the Pressure Test. The bottom three from the previous night's challenge are given a recipe for a particular dish they are to emulate in an allocated time. Once completed they are taken in to the judges to be tasted, before all three contestants are seated in front of the judges for critiquing. The judges then eliminate the contestant out of the three that performed least adequately in the test.

Tuesday episodes feature the Immunity Challenge, where the winner of the Sunday challenge competes against a guest, which can vary from a chef, apprentice, or to a home cook in a cook off. The contestant is given the choice of two pantries of ingredients they can use, usually contrasting such as "Black" and "White". The contestant gets a head start to complete the dish before their opponent starts cooking and after the allotted time for both is finished, the dishes are presented to the judges for tasting and scoring out of ten. The judges are not aware which dish was made by which person, however. If the contestant's dish's score is equal to or higher than that of the guest, they are crowned the winner of the challenge. In the first series they are given a free pass to the finals week of the competition and can go home. From series 2 onwards, they receive a pin that allows them to save themselves from one future elimination.

Wednesday features a Team Challenge. The contestants are split into teams, and are given a task, and a set amount of time to complete the challenge. Tasks have included presenting a three course meal to a celebrity guest, running a restaurant for an evening or catering an event such as a birthday party or wedding. Once completed and judged the teams are given the results, which can be determined by which team the judges think did the best, or receiving the most votes or making the most money by the people the teams had to cook for, with members of the losing team facing an elimination the next night. The winning team safe from elimination receives a reward (for example lunch at a top restaurant).

Thursday is another Elimination. The two worst performing contestants from the losing team in the team challenge compete against each other in a head-to-head challenge to determine who will be eliminated. The loser of the challenge is then eliminated. On some occasions, all members of the losing team will be selected to compete as individuals in the elimination challenge. In the first series, a different elimination process was used. The contestants from the losing team were to vote for a contestant that they each feel did not perform to their best and may have cost them the challenge. After voting the team is called in together to announce the results of the vote, with the contestant with the most votes being eliminated from the competition. If the previous challenge was an individual challenge, the bottom two contestants competed in a head-to-head taste test where one contestant at a time named one ingredient of a particular dish or sauce, and the first person to name an incorrect ingredient is eliminated. MasterClass airs on Thursday following the elimination show and is generally limited to themed weeks. Here, judges George, Gary and Matt run a masterclass for the remaining contestants, which usually call back to some of the challenges from the previous week. For example, they may revisit the Mystery Box challenge and demonstrate some other dishes that could have been made or redo one of the contestants' dishes to give tips on how it could have been improved.

==== Back to Win Episodes ====
For series 12, the weekly format was modified to air a Team Challenge on Mondays, Pressure Tests on Tuesdays, Mystery Box on Wednesdays, Immunity Challenge on Thursdays and an All-In Elimination Challenge on Sundays. While an Immunity Pin was offered in the first challenge of the series, the Pins (as a regular weekly feature) were replaced with "Weekly Immunity", granting a contestant safety from the week's All-In Elimination, which involved all contestants except for one immune contestant. Immunity Challenges no longer involved competing against well-known chefs (hence there being no need for a mentor), and instead involved one or two challenge rounds which contestants progressed through to win Immunity. This format is also used in series 13.

Due to the COVID-19 pandemic in Australia, the format for Series 12 was changed again, to a three-day format from mid-June, in which the winners of the Mystery Box on Monday participated in the Immunity Challenge on Tuesday. The winner of the challenge was immune from Sunday's All-In Elimination. Pressure Tests and Team Challenges were discarded and only one contestant was eliminated each week.

== Hosts and judges ==
=== Main series ===
Timeline of hosts, judges and other personnel
Starring	Series																	
Starring	1	2	3	4	5	6	7	8	9	10	11	12	13	14	15	16	17	18
Gary Mehigan	Judge	Host & Judge	Host & Judge	Host & Judge	Host & Judge	Host & Judge	Host & Judge	Host & Judge	Host & Judge	Host & Judge	Host & Judge							
George Calombaris	Judge	Host & Judge	Host & Judge	Host & Judge	Host & Judge	Host & Judge	Host & Judge	Host & Judge	Host & Judge	Host & Judge	Host & Judge							
Matt Preston	Judge	Host & Judge	Host & Judge	Host & Judge	Host & Judge	Host & Judge	Host & Judge	Host & Judge	Host & Judge	Host & Judge	Host & Judge							
Sarah Wilson	Host																	
Matt Moran	Guest Judge	Guest Judge	Judge	Guest Mentor														
Jock Zonfrillo										Guest Judge	Guest Judge	Host & Judge	Host & Judge	Host & Judge	Host & Judge			
Melissa Leong												Host & Judge	Host & Judge	Host & Judge	Host & Judge			
Andy Allen				Contestant								Host & Judge	Host & Judge	Host & Judge	Host & Judge	Host & Judge	Host & Judge	Host & Judge
Poh Ling Yeow	Contestant						Guest Judge				Guest Mentor	Contestant	Guest Judge		Guest Judge	Host & Judge	Host & Judge	Host & Judge
Jean-Christophe Novelli																Host & Judge	Host & Judge	Host & Judge
Sofia Levin																Host & Judge	Host & Judge	Host & Judge
Curtis Stone	Guest Judge	Guest Judge	Guest Judge		Guest Judge	Guest Judge	Guest Judge	Guest Judge	Guest Judge	Guest Judge	Guest Judge	Guest Judge	Guest Judge	Guest Judge	Guest Judge	Guest Judge	Guest Judge	TBA
Adriano Zumbo	Guest Judge	Guest Judge	Guest Judge	Guest Judge						Guest Judge				Guest Judge		Guest Judge		
Julie Goodwin	Contestant	Guest Judge		Guest Judge		Guest Judge				Guest Mentor				Contestant	Guest Judge	Guest Diner	Guest Judge	TBA
Heston Blumenthal		Guest Judge	Guest Judge	Guest Judge	Guest Judge	Guest Judge	Guest Judge	Guest Judge	Guest Judge	Guest Judge	Guest Judge		Guest Judge	Guest Judge				
Darren Purchese		Guest Judge	Guest Judge	Guest Judge	Guest Judge	Guest Judge	Guest Judge		Guest Judge	Guest Judge	Guest Judge	Guest Judge	Guest Judge			Guest Judge		
Shannon Bennett		Guest Judge	Guest Judge	Guest Judge			Guest Mentor	Guest Mentor	Guest Mentor	Guest Mentor				Guest Judge	Guest Mentor		Guest Judge	TBA
Maggie Beer		Guest Judge	Guest Judge	Guest Judge	Guest Judge	Guest Judge	Guest Judge	Guest Judge	Guest Judge	Guest Judge	Guest Judge			Guest Judge	Guest Judge		Guest Judge	TBA
Peter Gilmore		Guest Judge	Guest Judge	Guest Judge	Guest Judge		Guest Judge	Guest Judge	Guest Judge	Guest Judge	Guest Judge		Guest Judge	Guest Judge	Guest Judge		Guest Judge	TBA
Rick Stein		Guest Judge	Guest Judge	Guest Judge			Guest Judge				Guest Judge			Guest Judge	Guest Judge	Guest Judge		
Luke Nguyen		Guest Judge	Guest Judge					Guest Judge							Guest Judge	Guest Judge		
Kylie Kwong		Guest Judge		Guest Judge		Guest Mentor												
Nigella Lawson			Guest Judge					Guest Judge		Guest Judge	Guest Judge		Guest Judge					
Marco Pierre White			Guest Judge	Guest Judge		Guest Judge	Guest Judge	Guest Judge						Guest Judge				
Massimo Bottura				Guest Judge			Guest Judge				Guest Judge		Guest Judge					
Jamie Oliver				Guest Judge											Guest Judge	Guest Judge		
Kirsten Tibballs					Guest Judge		Guest Judge		Guest Judge	Guest Judge	Guest Judge	Guest Judge	Guest Judge	Guest Judge	Guest Judge		Guest Judge	TBA
Martin Benn						Guest Judge						Guest Judge	Guest Judge					
Anna Polyviou							Guest Judge	Guest Judge	Guest Judge							Guest Judge		
Callum Hann		Contestant						Guest Chef				Contestant		Guest Judge			Contestant	
Billie McKay							Contestant	Guest Judge			Guest Mentor			Contestant				
Reynold Poernomo							Contestant	Guest Judge	Guest Chef	Guest Chef		Contestant	Guest Judge	Guest Judge				
Yotam Ottolenghi									Guest Judge		Guest Judge		Guest Judge					
Clare Smyth									Guest Judge		Guest Judge		Guest Judge	Guest Judge	Guest Judge	Guest Judge		
Matt Sinclair								Contestant	Guest Judge	Guest Chef	Guest Mentor				Guest Chef			
Gordon Ramsay										Guest Judge		Guest Judge					Guest Judge	TBA

=== Spin-off series ===
Timeline of hosts and judges
Starring	Seasons								
Starring	C1	J1	J2	A-S	TP	J3	C2	DM1	DM2
Gary Mehigan	Host & Judge	Host & Judge	Host & Judge	Host & Judge					
George Calombaris	Host & Judge	Host & Judge	Host & Judge	Host & Judge					
Matt Preston	Judge	Host & Judge		Host & Judge	Host & Judge				
Anna Gare		Judge	Judge						
Matt Moran			Judge						
Marco Pierre White					Host & Judge				
Jock Zonfrillo						Host & Judge	Host & Judge		
Andy Allen						Host & Judge	Host & Judge		
Melissa Leong						Host & Judge	Host & Judge	Host & Judge	Host & Judge
Amaury Guichon								Host & Judge	Host & Judge

== Winners ==
=== Main series ===
Series	Placement	Contestant	Age	State	Occupation	Date
1	Winner	Julie Goodwin	38	NSW	Office manager	19 July 2009
1	Runner-up	Poh Ling Yeow	35	SA	Artist	19 July 2009
1	Third Place	Chris Badenoch	41	VIC	Beer merchant	16 July 2009
2	Winner	Adam Liaw	31	SA	Lawyer	25 July 2010
2	Runner-up	Callum Hann	20	SA	Student	25 July 2010
2	Third Place	Claire Winton Burn	31	VIC	Lawyer	22 July 2010
3	Winner	Kate Bracks	35	NSW	Stay-at-home mum	7 August 2011
3	Runner-up	Michael Weldon	25	SA	Film projectionist	7 August 2011
3	Third Place	Alana Lowes	30	QLD	Journalist	4 August 2011
4	Winner	Andy Allen	24	NSW	Electrician	25 July 2012
4	Runner-up	Julia Taylor	26	QLD	Legal secretary	25 July 2012
4	Third Place	Audra Morrice	41	NSW	Account manager	25 July 2012
5	Winner	Emma Dean	35	VIC	Town planner	1 September 2013
5	Runner-up	Lynton Tapp	25	NT	Stockman	1 September 2013
5	Third Place	Samira El Khafir	28	VIC	Stay-at-home mum	1 September 2013
6	Winner	Brent Owens	24	VIC	Bobcat driver	28 July 2014
6	Runner-up	Laura Cassai (Note: Now Laura Sharrad)	18	SA	Student	28 July 2014
6	Third Place	Emelia Jackson	24	VIC	Marketing coordinator	27 July 2014
7	Winner	Billie McKay	24	NSW	Restaurant manager	27 July 2015
7	Runner-up	Georgia Barnes	27	QLD	Health product representative	27 July 2015
7	Third Place	Jessica Arnott	29	WA	Food sales assistant	26 July 2015
8	Winner	Elena Duggan	32	NSW	Teacher	26 July 2016
8	Runner-up	Matt Sinclair	27	QLD	Coffee roaster	26 July 2016
8	Third Place	Harry Foster	21	QLD	Cocktail bartender	25 July 2016
9	Winner	Diana Chan	29	VIC	Accountant	24 July 2017
9	Runner-up	Ben Ungermann	32	QLD	Retail manager	24 July 2017
9	Third Place	Karlie Verkerk	26	NSW	Deputy editor	23 July 2017
10	Winner	Sashi Cheliah	40	SA	Prison officer	31 July 2018
10	Runner-up	Ben Borsht	31	QLD	Builder	31 July 2018
10	Third Place	Khanh Ong	25	VIC	DJ	30 July 2018
11	Winner	Larissa Takchi	22	NSW	Restaurant manager	23 July 2019
11	Runner-up	Tessa Boersma	27	QLD	Criminal statistician	23 July 2019
11	Third Place	Simon Toohey	32	VIC	Cocktail bartender	23 July 2019
12	Winner	Emelia Jackson	30	VIC	Cake designer and chef	25 July 2020
12	Runner-up	Laura Sharrad (Note: Formerly Laura Cassai)	24	SA	Chef and restaurateur	25 July 2020
12	Third Place	Reynold Poernomo	26	NSW	Chef and restaurateur	19 July 2020
13	Winner	Justin Narayan	27	WA	Youth pastor	13 July 2021
13	Runner-up	Pete Campbell	36	NSW	Tattoo artist	13 July 2021
13	Third Place	Kishwar Chowdhury	38	VIC	Printing business owner	13 July 2021
14	Winner	Billie McKay	31	NSW	Stay-at-home mum	12 July 2022
14	Runner-up	Sarah Todd	34	VIC	Chef and restaurateur	12 July 2022
14	Third Place	Daniel Lamble	28	NT	Firefighter	11 July 2022
15	Winner	Brent Draper	34	QLD	Digital content creator	16 July 2023
15	Runner-up	Rhiannon Anderson	47	QLD	Administration manager	16 July 2023
15	Third Place	Declan Cleary	24	NSW	Carpenter	13 July 2023
16	Winner	Nat Thaipun	28	VIC	Barista	16 July 2024
16	Runner-up	Josh Perry	43	TAS	Butcher	16 July 2024
16	Third Place	Savindri Perera	30	SA	Banking consultant	15 July 2024
17	Winner	Laura Sharrad	29	SA	Chef	12 August 2025
17	Runner-up	Callum Hann	35	SA	Chef and restauranteur	12 August 2025
17	Third Place	Jamie Fleming	36	QLD	Bar owner	11 August 2025
18	Winner	Vinnie Gibaldi	26	VIC	Registered nurse	9 August 2026
18	Runner-up	Petro Papathomas	30	VIC	Chartered accountant	9 August 2026
18	Third place	Aaron Kher	32	VIC	Medical product specialist	3 August 2026

=== Spin-off series ===
Season	Contestant	Occupation	Date Won
C1	Eamon Sullivan	Olympic swimmer	25 November 2009
J1	Isabella Bliss	School student	15 November 2010
J2	Greta Yaxley	School student	23 November 2011
A-S	Callum Hann	Uni student	12 August 2012
TP	Rhys Badcock	Cruise liner chef	17 March 2013
J3	Georgia Eris	School student	9 November 2020
C2	Nick Riewoldt	AFL player	22 November 2021
DM1	Gareth Whitton	Pastry chef	28 November 2023
DM2	John Demetrios	Pastry chef	24 November 2024

== Series synopsis ==
=== Series 1 (2009) ===
The first series of MasterChef Australia was broadcast between 27 April 2009 and 19 July 2009. Applications for contestants closed on 8 January 2009, with subsequent auditions held in Perth, Brisbane, Melbourne, Adelaide and Sydney. More than 7,000 people auditioned for the show.

The Top 50 portion of the series was filmed at the Australian Technology Park in Sydney. From the Top 20 onwards, filming was moved to a studio on Doody Street in Alexandria, Sydney. The series one finale was filmed on 2 July 2009, two and a half weeks before its actual television broadcast.

The winner was I.T. office manager Julie Goodwin, who defeated Poh Ling Yeow.

=== Series 2 (2010) ===
The second series of MasterChef Australia premiered on 19 April 2010, with the initial call for contestants held in mid-2009.

Other changes to series 2 include not showing the initial auditions, with the series beginning instead with the Top 50 which were filmed at a Redfern Train Works building in Sydney, and having a Top 24 instead of a Top 20. Also, unlike series 1, the last 45 minutes of the finale were broadcast live.

The winner was 31-year-old lawyer Adam Liaw who defeated Callum Hann.

=== Series 3 (2011) ===
On 4 July 2010, Network Ten confirmed the return of MasterChef with new judge Matt Moran joining the original judges for series 3.

The series premiere aired on 1 May 2011. It was watched by 1.511 million viewers.

The winner was 36-year-old mother, Kate Bracks, who defeated Michael Weldon in the grand final.

=== Series 4 (2012) ===
MasterChef Australia premiered Sunday 6 May on Network Ten. Regular judges, chefs George Calombaris and Gary Mehigan and food critic Matt Preston, returned for series 4.

Andy Allen defeated Julia Taylor. Audra Morrice came in third place.

=== Series 5 (2013) ===
Network Ten confirmed in August 2012 that they have commissioned a fifth series for 2013. The program was filmed at the Melbourne Showgrounds in Ascot Vale, Victoria. Emma Dean won, with Lynton Tapp as the runner-up.

Series 5 featured a number of changes to the format including casting that focussed on contestant's personalities above cooking ability in response to the success of the Seven Network's rival cooking show My Kitchen Rules. The changes were not well received by both critics and audiences, and led to disappointing ratings compared to previous series. As a result of the show's poor audience response Network Ten cancelled all spin-off versions of Masterchef Australia as well as live events such as Masterchef Live in order to focus on "a new, fresh version in 2014 that will appeal to the loyal MasterChef fans as well as new viewers" according to Ten's chief programming officer, Beverley McGarvey.

=== Series 6 (2014) ===
Network Ten confirmed in August 2013 that they had recommissioned the show for another series, which aired in 2014. The program was once again filmed in Ascot Vale, Victoria at the Melbourne Showgrounds. In addition to the return of all three judges, Kylie Kwong was a guest mentor who appeared during the immunity challenges. Heston Blumenthal and Marco Pierre White joined the show for a full week of challenges.

Brent Owens was the winner, with Laura Cassai taking second place.

=== Series 7 (2015) ===
Shannon Bennett replaced Kwong as the regular in-house mentor for the immunity challenges. This series marked the return in stronger ratings for MasterChef Australia, with a series average of nearly 1.2 million metropolitan viewers. The finale (winner announced) was the highest rating non-sport TV event of 2015, with 2.2 million viewers (in metropolitan consolidated numbers).

It was won by Ballina restaurant manager Billie McKay. Georgia Barnes took second place.

=== Series 8 (2016) ===
The eighth series premiered on 1 May 2016. It was won by Elena Duggan with Matt Sinclair as runner-up.

=== Series 9 (2017) ===
The ninth series began on 1 May 2017. It was won by Diana Chan with Ben Ungermann as runner-up.

=== Series 10 (2018) ===
The tenth series began on 7 May 2018. It was won by Sashi Cheliah with Ben Borsht as runner-up.

=== Series 11 (2019) ===
The eleventh series premiered on 29 April 2019. This series, former contestants Poh Ling Yeow, Billie McKay, and Matt Sinclair replaced Shannon Bennett as in-house mentors. This is the final series to feature Gary Mehigan, George Calombaris and Matt Preston as the show's judges as broadcaster Ten failed to meet payrise demands set by the trio.

It was won by Larissa Takchi with Tessa Boersma as runner-up and Simon Toohey came in third place.

=== Series 12 (2020) ===
The twelfth series, subtitled Back To Win, premiered on 13 April 2020.

In October 2019, it was announced that Jock Zonfrillo, Melissa Leong and series four winner Andy Allen would replace Mehigan, Calombaris and Preston as series judges. It was also announced that they would be joined by previous contestants who had returned to have another chance to win the title of "Masterchef" and the A$250,000 grand cash prize.

It was won by Emelia Jackson with Laura Sharrad as runner-up.

=== Series 13 (2021) ===
The thirteenth series premiered on 19 April 2021.

It was won by Justin Narayan with Pete Campbell as runner-up and Kishwar Chowdhury in third place. Only one ending was filmed where in some previous years two endings were filmed. This led to speculation that the winner had been leaked and influenced betting.

=== Series 14 (2022) ===
The fourteenth series premiered on 18 April 2022. Subtitled Fans & Favourites, the series saw 12 new contestants go up against 12 former and returning MasterChef contestants including past winners Julie Goodwin, Billie McKay and Sashi Cheliah. It was won by McKay with Sarah Todd as runner-up.

=== Series 15 (2023) ===
The fifteenth series, subtitled Secrets & Surprises, premiered on 7 May 2023. This is the final series to feature judge Jock Zonfrillo following his death on 30 April 2023; however, filming of the season was completed before his death. It was won by Brent Draper, with Rhiannon Anderson as runner-up.

=== Series 16 (2024) ===
The sixteenth series premiered on 22 April 2024. it featured a four host/judge lineup for the first time, with French chef Jean-Christophe Novelli, TV cook Poh Ling Yeow and food critic Sofia Levin joining returning judge Andy Allen. It is expected that this series will see the 1,000th overall episode of MasterChef Australia, not including spin-offs. It was won by Nat Thaipun, with Josh Perry as runner-up.

=== Series 17 (2025) ===
The seventeenth season, the second iteration of the Back to Win series, premiered on 28 April 2025, with all judges returning. It was won by Laura Sharrad, with Callum Hann as runner-up.

=== Series 18 (2026) ===
The eighteenth season premiered on 19 April 2026, with all judges returning and featuring all new contestants. It was won by Vinnie Gibaldi, with Petro Papathomas as runner-up.

== Spin-off editions ==
=== Celebrity MasterChef Australia ===
Celebrity MasterChef Australia, a spin-off featuring celebrities as contestants began production in early September 2009, and aired for ten weeks starting from 30 September 2009. The celebrity version, which features a heats and semi-finals format similar to MasterChef Goes Large, is based around weekly episodes. Presenter Sarah Wilson did not return to present the show. Gary Mehigan, George Calombaris and Matt Preston returned as judges; Calombaris and Mehigan took Wilson's presenting role.

On 25 May 2021, it was announced that a second edition of Celebrity MasterChef Australia had been commissioned, 12 years after the first edition had aired, to air in late 2021. Andy Allen, Melissa Leong, and Jock Zonfrillo undertook the role of judges in the new series.

=== Junior MasterChef Australia ===
Production of a junior version of the show was initially suggested in October 2009. The first series of the show, featuring 8- to 12-year-old contestants, was filmed after the second series of MasterChef Australia. Junior MasterChef Australia is produced by Shine Australia.

=== MasterChef Australia All-Stars ===
Ten began broadcast of a special all-stars version of the show on 26 July 2012 that aired during the 2012 Summer Olympics. It featured a number of returning contestants from the first three series, including series 1 and 3 winners Julie Goodwin and Kate Bracks, who revisited past challenges in order to raise money for charity. It was won by series 2 runner-up Callum Hann, who ultimately raised $20,000 for Cancer Council Australia.

=== MasterChef Australia: The Professionals ===
A spin-off based the original BBC MasterChef: The Professionals series began airing on 20 January 2013. It featured 18 professional chefs competing against each other as opposed to amateur cooks. Matt Preston and chef Marco Pierre White hosted the spin-off.

=== Dessert Masters ===
A new spin-off, Dessert Masters, was announced at Network Ten's upfronts presentation in October 2022. The series sees professional pastry chefs from around Australia compete in the MasterChef kitchen for a $100,000 prize. Melissa Leong and international pastry chef Amaury Guichon feature as judges.

== Reception ==
=== Ratings ===
The one-hour series premiere of MasterChef Australia attracted an average of 1.42 million viewers, making it the most watched show in its timeslot. Ratings steadily grew throughout the first series, with the show dominating Australian ratings as it entered finals week, averaging around or above 2 million viewers an episode, and on daily rankings placing ahead of other high rating shows such as the Seven Network's Packed to the Rafters and Nine's Rugby League State of Origin broadcast. Its success is despite initial belief from critics that the series would be a dud based on the performance of previous prime time cooking shows, as well as general cynicism against a new reality show format.

The first series finale of MasterChef Australia attracted an average of 3,745,000 viewers, and peaked at 4.11 million viewers. This figure was for the last half-hour of the show, titled MasterChef Australia: The Winner Announced, while the first 90 minutes of the finale averaged 3,313,000 viewers. The figure also eclipsed the show's previous high, set on the last elimination episode, of 2.36 million viewers and also surpassed the previous high for a non-sporting event (Australian Idol's 2004 finale, which averaged in 3.35 million) since OzTAM ratings started in 2001. It is currently the 4th highest rating television program in Australia since 2001, behind the 2005 Australian Open final between Lleyton Hewitt and Marat Safin, and the 2003 Rugby World Cup Final. Ten's share for the night was 41.3%, almost 20% ahead of its nearest rival. The first series finale was the most watched television program of 2009.

The highly anticipated second series premiere of the show attracted 1.69 million viewers, peaking at 2.11 million nationwide. In general, the second series rated higher on average compared to the first series, with weekday episodes seeing a 35% increase in viewers by the midpoint of the series. The last half-hour of the second series final attracted 3,962,000 viewers and 3,542,000 during the rest of the final out rating the series 1 final to become the 3rd highest rating show of all time.

Based on the number of viewers and the nightly ratings, series 5 of Masterchef was considered the worst, with the finale being ranked the fifth most viewed television show that night, compared to every other series of Masterchef ranking #1. It is also the only series of the show to have under 1 million viewers of the finale, and it has received the lowest nightly rankings with several episodes below the top 20 in terms of most viewed shows. In total there were only half the number of viewers from series 4. As a result of the show's poor audience response Network Ten cancelled all spin-off versions of Masterchef Australia in order to focus on "a new, fresh version in 2014 that will appeal to the loyal MasterChef fans as well as new viewers" according to Ten's chief programming officer, Beverley McGarvey.

=== Main series ratings ===
Series	Premiere date	Finale date	Episodes	Premiere ratings	Rank	Finale ratings (Grand final)	Rank	Finale ratings (Winner announced)	Rank	Series Average
1	27 April 2009	19 July 2009	72	1.428	#7	3.313	#2	3.745	#1	1.532
2	19 April 2010	25 July 2010	84	1.695	#1	3.542	#2	3.962	#1	1.761
3	1 May 2011	7 August 2011	86	1.569	#1	2.334	#2	2.740	#1	1.488
4	6 May 2012	25 July 2012	70	1.368	#4	1.888	#2	2.191	#1	1.132
5	2 June 2013	1 September 2013	65	1.100	#8	0.921	#8	1.057	#5	0.739
6	5 May 2014	28 July 2014	60	0.874	#10	1.654	#2	1.703	#1	1.001
7	5 May 2015	27 July 2015	62	1.231	#1	1.840	#2	2.133	#1	1.168
8	1 May 2016	26 July 2016	63	1.012	#4	1.711	#2	1.875	#1	1.108
9	1 May 2017	24 July 2017	63	1.060	#5	1.120	#3	1.303	#2	0.873
10	7 May 2018	31 July 2018	61	0.890	#7	1.126	#3	1.309	#1	0.848
11	29 April 2019	23 July 2019	61	0.715	#7	0.831	#7	0.992	#3	0.651
12	13 April 2020	20 July 2020	61	1.228	#3	1.261	#2	1.523	#1	0.980
13	19 April 2021	13 July 2021	61	0.670	#8	0.824	#6	0.931	#5	0.724
14	18 April 2022	12 July 2022	62	0.545	#9	0.755	#6	0.875	#3	
15	7 May 2023	16 July 2023	50	0.761	#3	0.614	#5	0.698	#3	
16	22 April 2024	16 July 2024	50	0.776	#6	0.985	#3	-		
Overall average			1,031	1.141	#5	1.720	#3	1.959	#2	1.107

=== Spin-off series ratings ===
Series	Premiere date	Finale date	Episodes	Premiere ratings	Rank	Finale ratings (Grand final)	Rank	Finale ratings (Winner announced)	Rank	Series Average
Celebrity 1	30 September 2009	25 November 2009	10	1.363	#2	1.297	#1	—N/a		1.187
Junior 1	12 September 2010	15 November 2010	17	2.202	#1	1.532	#2	1.853	#1	1.313
Junior 2	25 September 2011	23 November 2011	20	1.129	#5	0.934	#10	0.911	#12	0.844
All-Stars	25 July 2012	19 August 2012	19	1.256	#1	0.802	#11	1.050	#7	0.807
The Professionals	20 January 2013	17 March 2013	25	1.165	#3	0.980	#11	1.022	#9	0.886
Junior 3	11 October 2020	9 November 2020	13	0.524	#8	0.652	#12	0.881	#5	0.539
Celebrity 2	10 October 2021	22 November 2021	13	0.620	#6	0.700	#6	0.805	#5	0.558
Overall average			117	1.273	#3	1.109	#7	1.209	#7	1.007

=== Critical and popular reception ===
Despite success in ratings, the series initially received mixed reviews, with fans of the original British version describing the Australian show to be incomparable to that version in terms of quality, structure, judgement and skill of the contestant. Other commentators have also criticised the show for using a competition format similar to other reality shows such as Australian Idol, The Biggest Loser and Project Runway Australia that focuses more on the elimination of contestants than the food and cooking itself. Ten's programming chief David Mott admitted that using the new format was "a huge risk", while FremantleMedia's Paul Franklin has asserted that "for a commercial audience we needed to pump it up and make it bigger, a little over the top, with more drama and storytelling and a sense of theatre".

Despite these harsh views, it is still popular amongst many others who have praised the balance of entertainment, skill and overall presentation which is more fun-loving in its (Australian) attitude in comparison with the original British format. The show has been described as "an antidote for cynicism" and a reflection of multicultural Australia, while the show's success has been attributed to audiences "uncomfortable with the win-at-all-cost mould of reality shows of old" and a shift in values during the 2008 financial crisis. As is noted in MasterChef Australia's premiere episode of series 4, since it premiered in 2009 (the first MasterChef series outside of the UK (est. 1990)), it has been such a success that France, Greece, Turkey, Portugal, New Zealand, India, Peru, Finland, Sweden, Italy, Germany, Denmark, Norway, the US and many other countries have all followed Australia's lead and formed their own series of the show in their respective countries; this in itself reveals the popularity of the Australian show from an international audience's perspective compared to that of the British version.

Cooking schools have reported an increase in enrolments due to the success of the series, while kitchenware retailers and upmarket restaurants have also seen increased trade. Supermarkets and specialty food retailers have reported increased demand from the public for more unusual ingredients, such as quail, custard apple and squab, after such were featured on the program. The success of the show led Ten to explore possible spin-offs such as the celebrity and junior versions, as well as one featuring professional chefs as contestants. The success of the show has also led competing networks to commission their own competitive cooking programs, such as Seven's My Kitchen Rules and Nine's The Great Aussie Cook-Off after the first series of the Australian version, with reports that both networks were planning more copycat shows to air in late 2010 and early 2011.

MasterChef Australia won the award for Most Popular Reality Program at the 2010 Logie Awards. In addition, Matt Preston won the Graham Kennedy Award for Most Outstanding New Talent for his work on the program.

== Controversy ==
=== Allegations of vote rigging ===
Significant numbers of viewers have raised allegations that the voting on the series one finale of MasterChef was fraudulent after Julie Goodwin won the crown over Poh Ling Yeow. After the airing of the finale talkback radio became inundated with calls, both for and against the verdict, and the finale also became a top trending topic on social networking site Twitter, where many users said they felt "deflated" and "ripped off" by the final episode of the hit show. Similar allegations were raised when contestants were eliminated throughout the series.

Judge Matt Preston has denied that eliminations were rigged or the result of a popularity contest, and asserted that Julie had won the title because she was the better cook on the night. Goodwin herself has also asserted that her victory was not the result of rigging, insisting that the professional integrity of the three judges would be damaged if it were.

=== Welfare of former contestants ===
During their time playing MasterChef, the contestants are paid a retainer of $500 a week. This is slightly below the national Australian minimum wage of $589.30 and less than half the average wage of $1,291.34. However, contestants have their accommodation provided for the duration of their time in the competition, meaning they live rent-free. These facts were revealed in 2011 along with the knowledge that most contestants quit their jobs before entering the competition and faced seeking re-employment once eliminated from the show.

=== Marco Pierre White ===
Following comments made by judge Matt Preston about Marco Pierre White's son's admitted $500,000 splurge of his father's money on drugs and prostitution, White stopped making guest appearances on MasterChef Australia after the eighth series and joined the rival programme Hell's Kitchen Australia. In 2016, whilst on The Kyle and Jackie O Show, Preston was asked about Marco Jr.'s time on Big Brother UK, which included his alleged on–air sex and the above admission to purchasing illicit drugs and sex workers. Preston said "I think it is that terrible thing when you have kids that go off the rails... the drugs might be a little bit of a worry". This sparked a series of profanity–filled social media attacks by Marco Jr. which he has since apologised for. The senior White later said of Preston that "I will never forgive that man... with my hand on my mother's grave I will get that man". White eventually returned to the program in series 14, after Preston had left the show.

== International syndication ==
The networks in bold also broadcast their own version of MasterChef.

Country	Network	Dubbed or subtitled?	Current broadcaster?
Afghanistan	STAR World	Subtitled in Dari	No
Arab League	Fox Series	Subtitled in Arabic	No
Arab League	STAR World		No
Belgium	Vitaya	Subtitled in Dutch	Yes
Canada	Casa	Dubbed in French	Yes
Canada	CTV Life (formerly Gusto)		Yes
Croatia	**Nova TV**	Subtitled	No
Denmark	TV3 Puls	Subtitled	No
Finland	Jim	Subtitled	No
Finland	**Nelonen**	Subtitled	No
Greece	**Mega Channel**	Subtitled	No
Greece	**Star Channel**		No
Hong Kong	Lifetime	Subtitled in Chinese	No
India	Disney+ Hotstar	Subtitled in English	Yes
India	Zee Zest	Dubbed in Hindi	Yes(S11 Repeat Telecast )
Indonesia	B-Channel (now RTV)	Subtitled	No
Indonesia	Lifetime	Subtitled	No
Ireland	Good Food		No
Ireland	Really		No
Ireland	**RTÉ One**		No
Ireland	Watch		No
Israel	Channel 2	Subtitled in Hebrew	No
Italy	cielo (TV channel)	Dubbed	Yes
Italy	Sky Uno	Dubbed	Yes
Macau	Lifetime	Subtitled in Cantonese	No
Malaysia	Lifetime	Subtitled in Malay & Chinese	Yes
New Zealand	**TVNZ 2**		Yes (from series 12)
New Zealand	TVNZ 1		No
New Zealand	Prime		No
Norway	**TLC /** Dplay	Subtitled	Yes
Pakistan	STAR World; Fox	Subtitled in English; Subtitled in Arabic	Yes; Yes
Poland	TLC	Polish lector	Yes
Portugal	SIC Mulher	Subtitled	Yes
Portugal	24Kitchen	Subtitled	
Russia	Телекафе	Russian double voice-over	
Singapore	Lifetime	Subtitled in Chinese	Yes
Singapore	**MediaCorp Channel 5**		Yes
Slovenia	**VOYO**	Subtitled in Slovenian	Yes
South Africa	**M-Net**	Yes	
Sri Lanka	MAX TV	Yes	Subtitled in English
Sweden	**TLC**	Yes	Subtitled
Taiwan	STAR World	No	Subtitled
The Netherlands	Net5	Yes	Subtitled
The Netherlands	RTL 5	Yes	Subtitled
The Netherlands	**SBS6**	Yes	Subtitled
United Kingdom	UKTV Play	Yes	
United Kingdom	W	Yes	
Vietnam	VTV6 (Junior version)	Subtitled in Vietnamese	No

== Print publications ==
=== Official MasterChef Cookbook Volume 1 ===
The Official MasterChef Cookbook Volume 1 was published by Random House Australia in December 2009. It contains recipes from the series 1 Top 20 contestants and top Australian and international chefs: Martin Boetz, Donovan Cooke, Pete Evans, Manu Feildel, Guy Grossi, Alex Herbert, Matt Moran and Andrew Honeysett, Ben O'Donoghue, Adrian Richardson, Frank Shek, Emmanuel Stroobant and Adriano Zumbo. There are also behind-the-scenes stories and culinary tips and tricks.

=== MasterChef Magazine ===
MasterChef Magazine, a monthly spin-off publication adopting the series' brand, went on sale in May 2010. Following a high-profile launch, the magazine exceeded its initial sales target within a short period of time, selling 90,000 copies in three days. The magazine was published by News Magazines, a subsidiary of News Limited. After losing a third of its readers in one year, the magazine was closed in October 2012.

== See also ==
- MasterChef Australia contestants with television series
- List of Australian television series
- List of cooking shows
