= Sarah Wilson (journalist) =

Australian journalist and tv presenter

- Education: Australian National University (B.A.)
- Occupations: Journalist, blogger, media consultant, author
- Writing career
- Language: English
- Notable works: I Quit Sugar (2012); First, We Make the Beast Beautiful (2017)
- Website: sarahwilson.com

Sarah Wilson is an Australian journalist, television presenter, blogger, media consultant, and author of several books, including I Quit Sugar (2012).

== Early life and education ==
Sarah Wilson grew up in the countryside outside Canberra, ACT, with five younger siblings. She owned her first business at the age of 12 or 13, selling library-book bags, brooches, and gift cards.

She has a Bachelor of Arts in philosophy, politics, gender studies and law from Australian National University, which she undertook between 1992 and 1997. She also completed an online course with the Institute for Integrative Nutrition, and describes herself as a health coach.

== Career ==
Wilson's first job as a journalist was as a restaurant reviewer for News Ltd's Sunday Magazine. At the age of 25, she had a weekly opinion column in News Ltd's Herald Sun.

=== Media roles ===
She was the editor of Australian Cosmopolitan magazine from February 2003 to December 2007. During her time at the magazine, she interviewed former Australian prime ministers John Howard and Kevin Rudd, and entered the Guinness Book of Records by staging the World's Biggest Bikini Shoot at Bondi Beach. During this time, she was also the fashion editor of Channel Nine's Today show. Wilson's first host role as a television presenter came in 2009 as the host of MasterChef Australia. After she left the program, her role was not replaced and a Network Ten spokesman, David Mott stated; "Sarah has an impressive background with abilities that far outweighed her duties on the show."

From 2009 until the end of 2011, Wilson wrote more than 130 weekly columns that appeared in Sunday Life, a magazine lift-out in the Australian Sun-Herald newspaper in Sydney. Her columns focused on the wellness movement, productivity and lifestyle simplicity - themes that are also explored in her blog. Wilson later became the face and program developer for Foxtel's Lifestyle YOU channel. She hosted the show Eat Yourself Sexy, a nutrition and wellness makeover program that screened on Foxtel in late 2011.

=== I Quit Sugar ===
Wilson is known for her I Quit Sugar books. After she resigned from Cosmopolitan and returned to freelancing and weekly columns, she wrote about experimentally quitting sugar for a week. As she explains in First, We Make the Beast Beautiful she subsequently wrote the ebook, I Quit Sugar: an 8-week program. Sales were good, with reportedly more than 100,000 copies sold in Australia. The e-book spawned a hard copy book and then several recipe books, eating programs and supermarket products, leading to a business based around reducing sugar consumption. The business employed 23 staff, and her online community had more than 2.3 million people. Along with fellow Australian journalist Peter FitzSimons, Wilson has been vocal about reducing Australians' sugar intake and leading a more active healthy active lifestyle. Wilson's views about sugar and some of her recipes have drawn criticism from some dietitians and commentators, and her qualifications as a "health coach" have been criticised as being insufficient to allow her to provide dietary advice.

Stating that her intention was never to build up a business empire and make money, Wilson announced the closure of her I Quit Sugar business in February 2018 and began pursuing other entrepreneurial activities and charity work.

=== Vaccination comments ===
In April 2013, Wilson was criticised for statements she made on the morning variety show Sunrise, where she claimed the evidence for the safety and efficacy of vaccines was "not conclusive". Sunday Telegraph journalist Jane Hansen condemned Wilson's comments, writing: "if you are going to hang yourself out there as a voice on healthy living, you have to be informed." Wilson responded on Twitter that she was not against vaccinations and had been asked for the arguments that the anti-vaccination movement presented, rather than her personal views.

== Books ==
- I Quit Sugar, Pan Macmillan (2012)
- First, We Make The Beast Beautiful (2017)
- This One Wild and Precious Life: A Hopeful Path Forward in a Fractured World (2020)
- I Eat the Stars (2026)

== Personal life ==
Wilson was diagnosed with an autoimmune disease, Hashimoto's thyroiditis in 2008, and lives with anxiety and bipolar disorder.
