= Jean-Christophe Novelli =

French celebrity chef (born 1961)

Jean-Christophe Novelli MBE
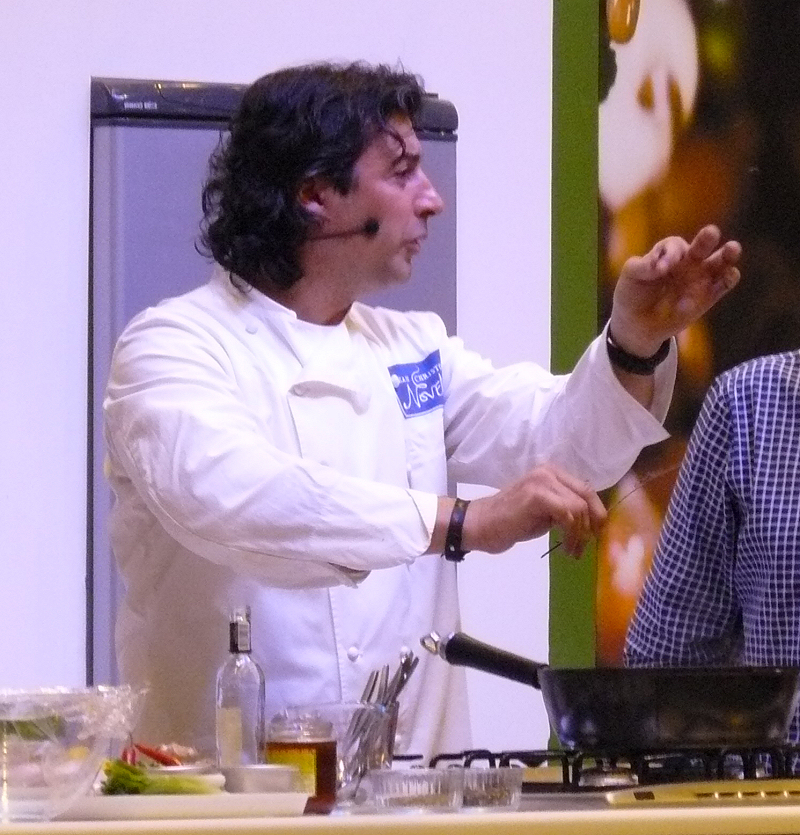
- Born: 22 February 1961 (age 65); Arras, France
- Spouse(s): Tina (divorced) Anzelle Visser (m. 1999; div. 2005)
- Children: 4, including Christina
- Culinary career
- Cooking style: Mediterranean, French
- Current restaurants
- Novelli at City Quays, AC Marriott - Belfast NI

Jean-Christophe Novelli (IPA: [ʒɑ̃ kʁistɔf nɔvɛli]; born 22 February 1961) is a French chef, restaurateur and television personality.

== Early life ==
Novelli was born in Arras, in the Pas-de-Calais department in northern France, in 1961. He left school at 14 and worked in a bakery before, at the age of 20, becoming a personal chef to the Rothschild family. His father's family is Italian.

== Career ==
Novelli moved to Britain in 1983, working in several establishments including the Chewton Glen Hotel in New Milton, Hampshire, later running Keith Floyd's Maltster's Arms restaurant in Totnes, Devon. He won the first of four Michelin stars as Chef Patron at Gordleton Mill in Lymington, Hampshire and was awarded Best Outstanding Dessert by Egon Ronay before becoming head chef at the Four Seasons Hotel on Hyde Park Corner, London. In 1996 he founded his restaurant, 'Maison Novelli', in Clerkenwell, London.

He opened further restaurants in London, France and South Africa. Novelli also expanded into the gastro-pub market, his first being The White Horse in Harpenden. In 2005, he launched the Novelli Academy Cookery School based at his home in Hertfordshire. He opened his first of many brasserie concept restaurants in the DoubleTree Hilton Hotel in Liverpool but withdrew the brand after a mutual decision between the brand and the owner in January 2016. In 2018, he opened 'Novelli at City Quays' in the new AC Marriott hotel in the City Quays, Belfast, Northern Ireland.

In 2013, Novelli launched a recipe book, Simply Novelli. In it, he aimed to eliminate the myth that French cuisine is difficult and time-consuming to prepare.

== Novelli Restaurants Limited ==
In 2016, the Novelli Restaurants Limited brand was created, and the Restaurant Team devised three offerings mainly aimed at quality hotels: Terrané by Jean-Christophe Novelli (brasseries), Bistro '61 by Jean-Christophe Novelli (bistro style) and Rapido by JCN (short menu concept). In 2018, Novelli announced the opening of his restaurant in the first Marriott hotel in Northern Ireland.

== Accolades ==
Jean-Christophe Novelli is a 5/5 AA Rosette and multi-Michelin-Star award-winning chef who has also been dubbed "The Nation’s Favourite French Chef", European Chef of the Year finalist representing Great Britain, and recipient of the prestigious Egon Ronay Dessert of the Year award. Voted the AA's Chef's Chef of the Year by his peers. His Novelli Academy has been voted one of the Top 25 Cooking Academies in the World, which he still owns and where he regularly hosts classes and performs his own cookery demonstrations.

On 5 September 2007, Novelli was awarded an Honorary Doctor of Arts from the University of Bedfordshire.

In March 2021, Novelli was awarded an honorary MBE by Her Majesty the Queen in recognition of his many acts of "voluntary and charitable service".

== TV appearances ==
He appeared in the first series of The Games in 2003.

In 2005, Jean-Christophe became one of two Head Chefs in the second series of Hell's Kitchen with Gary Rhodes. In 2006, Novelli appeared on The X Factor: Battle of the Stars, performing in a group with fellow chefs Aldo Zilli, Paul Rankin and Ross Burden.

He has been a contestant on Family Fortunes with his fiancée Michelle Kennedy and on 2 May 2007 appeared on The Apprentice: You're Fired! on BBC Two, the show following The Apprentice on BBC One.

2009 saw Jean-Christophe presenting his own show for Bravo (USA) called Chef Academy where he trained nine aspiring chefs to be professionals over a ten-part series (originally planned for six episodes).

In October 2010, he teamed up with the Potato Council for a nationwide competition called Master Spud, which gave the winner a chance to star alongside him in a national TV advert. In 2012, Jean-Christophe was a judge on Britain's Best Chef (ITV).

In 2014, Novelli appeared on ITV's This Morning, Loose Women, and the last Alan Titchmarsh Show. He later appeared on the Britain's Got More Talent on ITV2 in 2015.

Jean-Christophe performs many demonstrations around Europe, Russia and many parts of the world, including Taste of Dubai and South Africa, passing on his passion for cooking and trying to teach people to cook more healthily using little saturated fats, low sugars and no salt.

In late 2015 Jean-Christophe featured in BBC One's A Question of Sport helping the mystery guest cook in his academy.

January 2016 saw a lengthy appearance of Jean-Christophe showing the uses and benefits of rapeseed oil on the very popular BBC One show, Countryfile.

He was also a member of the celebrity audience in Derren Brown's TV special The Gathering.

In 2017, he was the judge for week four of the ITV show Culinary Genius.

In 2019, he, with his partner chef Aldo Zilli, won the third season of the Channel 4 show Celebrity Hunted.

In February 2021, Jean-Christophe cooked live on Steph's Packed Lunch on C4 and, with the help of his sons Jean and Jacques, he made pancakes on Jeremy Vine on 5. Jean-Christophe also prepared 2 of his favourite classics - Mussels and Tarte Tatin - for Raymond Blanc when he appeared as his guest chef in Episodes 4 & 8 of Simply Raymond Blanc on ITV (February and March 2021).

In October 2023, it was announced that Novelli would become a judge on the Australian Network 10 competitive cooking show MasterChef Australia in 2024, alongside fellow new judges Poh Ling Yeow and Sofia Levin, as well as returning judge Andy Allen.

In 2026, Novelli was the executive chef for ITV2 reality television series The Heat, in which 10 young chefs compete in a restaurant kitchen in Barcelona to be crowned star chef.

== The Novelli Academy ==
In 2005 Jean-Christophe Novelli opened the Novelli Academy, which is based in his 14th-century home in Hertfordshire. Novelli continues to host public, private and virtual masterclasses and corporate team-bonding events. During sessions in the Academy, Novelli promotes healthy cooking by replacing salt and sugar with his own unique flavours and reducing the amount of saturated fats.

== Personal life ==
Novelli has been divorced twice. His first wife, Tina, was of English descent. He has a daughter from his first marriage, Christina Novelli (born 1986), who is a musician and songwriter. He married his second wife, Anzelle Visser, from Stellenbosch in South Africa, in 1999. At the time, she was a model and also worked at Maison Novelli. They divorced in 2005. Novelli got engaged in November 2007 to his girlfriend of 2 years, Michelle Kennedy. On 29 August 2008, Kennedy gave birth to a son in Los Angeles. In July 2012, Kennedy gave birth to another son (Jacques) in St Johann in Pongau, Austria. They have a third son called Valentino who was born in 2016, who has a condition called 15q13.3 microdeletion syndrome, a rare genetic disorder.
