= Nicholas McKay (actor) =

Australian actor

Nicholas "Nick" McKay (born 25 September 1968) is an Australian actor who has appeared in a recurring role on the television series Farscape. In addition, he voiced Nev, a bull elephant seal in the acclaimed 2006 animated film, Happy Feet. He is the voice actor for The X Factor (Australia) and he was the original narrator of MasterChef Australia from 2009 until 2012.

He was educated at The King's School, Parramatta.

He was the voice-over for Network 10 multi-channel One HD, between 2009 & 2012. Then 2012–2025 “Nick” was the voiceover of the Seven News division of the Seven Network and associated promos.

He is currently the Promo voice-over for the South Pacific and Australasian region for ESPN.
