= Kate Bracks =

Australian reality television cook

- Born: Katherine Jane Pickett; 1974 (age 51–52); Sydney, New South Wales, Australia
- Occupation: Cook
- Predecessor: Adam Liaw
- Successor: Andy Allen
- Spouse: Luke Bracks
- Children: 3
- Awards: Winner, MasterChef Australia

Katherine Jane Bracks (née Pickett; born 1974) is an Australian reality television cook. She is the winner of the third series of MasterChef Australia.

Bracks, mother of three children, was previously a school teacher. She lives in Orange, New South Wales and attends Orange Evangelical Church. While on the show, Bracks refused to call the Dalai Lama "Your Holiness", saying that "My belief is that God is the only one that is perfectly holy." Her stance attracted media attention in India.

Released a cook book in 2012: The Sweet Life: Desserts from Australia's MasterChef.

After two years, when she had fulfilled her contractual obligations, Bracks returned to her work as a teacher.

Preceded by Adam Liaw	MasterChef Australia; Winner; 2011	Succeeded by Andy Allen
