= You TV =

Sri Lankan Analog TV Channel

You TV was an analog television channel available in Sri Lanka owned by the private company MGM Networks (Pvt) Ltd. It is currently running test transmissions while its sister radio channel, Max Radio, has already begun proper transmissions.

== Programming ==
You TV started its operations as Max Television. At their time of launch, the channel featured programs from NDTV 24x7. You TV nowadays features programs from France 24.
