= Poh Ling Yeow =

Malaysian-born Australian cook (born 1973)

- 楊寶玲
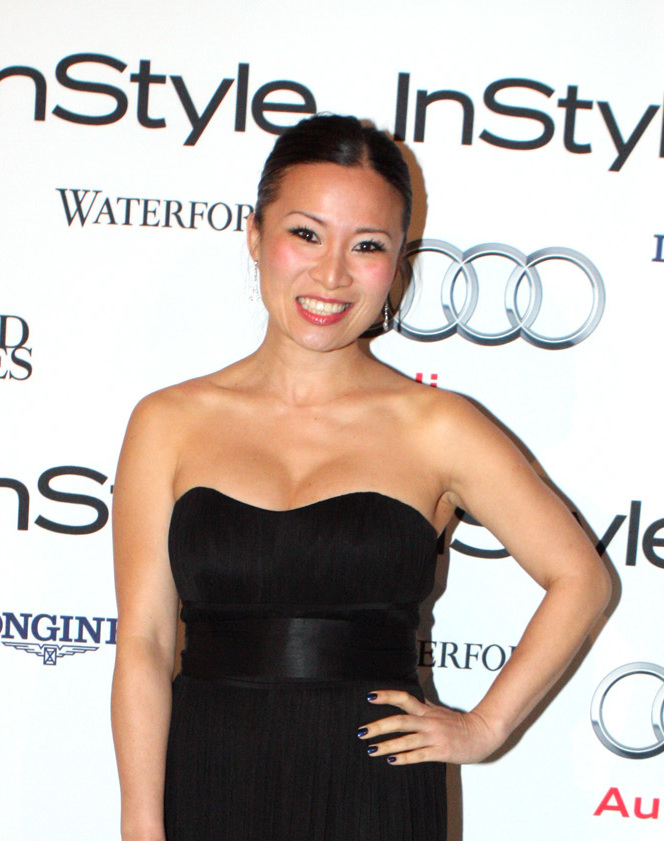
- Yeow at the InStyle and Audi Woman of Style Awards, May 2013
- Born: 17 December 1973 (age 52); Malaysia
- Citizenship: Australian
- Education: University of South Australia
- Occupations: Cook; artist; actress; author; television presenter
- Years active: 1998–present
- Style: Asian fusion, Southeast Asian, French pastry, bakery (cooking); Painting (art)
- Title: Runner-up, MasterChef Australia (season 1)
- Spouse(s): Jono Bennett (m. 2014; sep. 2021) Matt Phipps (divorced)
- Website: Poh and Co.; Poh's Kitchen; Art by Poh

Poh Ling Yeow (Chinese: 杨宝玲; pinyin: Yáng Bǎolíng; born 17 December 1973) is a Malaysian-born Australian cook, artist, actress, author and television presenter. She has hosted multiple cooking shows including ABC's Poh's Kitchen and SBS's Poh & Co. She has also published multiple cook books. She was the runner-up on the first season of Network 10's Masterchef Australia behind winner Julie Goodwin. Since appearing on season 1, she has made multiple comebacks to the series as a guest judge/mentor, returning as a contestant on the twelfth season in 2020, then a judge since the sixteenth season in 2024.

== Early life and history ==
Born in Malaysia on 17 December 1973 into a fifth-generation Malaysian Chinese family, Yeow's mother is of Hakka descent. Yeow attended SMK Convent Bukit Nanas. She immigrated to Australia at age nine with her parents and brother, eventually settling in Adelaide, South Australia. After attending Seymour College and then the University of South Australia (where she earned a Bachelor of Design degree), Yeow worked as a freelance graphic designer, illustrator and makeup artist.

Yeow's corporate clients as a makeup artist included L'Oréal and Attitude magazine, the Australian String Quartet and the short film My Last Ten Hours With You. Her personal clients included Megan Gale and Lisa Ho. Freelance work as a makeup artist led to her preparing models for artist David Bromley, increasing her understanding of the art market. Yeow has acknowledged that she posed as a nude model for Bromley.

Yeow adopted the Western first name Sharon until age 25, but reverted to Poh Ling as a part of embracing her cultural heritage. She became a full-time professional artist in 2002.

== Career ==
=== Artist ===
Yeow works mainly with acrylic paint on canvas. Her early works featured heavily textured backgrounds whereas recent works present a smoother, more refined and highly detailed finish.

Elements of her Chinese heritage feature in her work, including the goldfish, a symbol of prosperity and good luck in Chinese culture, lotus flowers, ponds and Australian flora and fauna. A recurring character in Yeow's recent work is one that she calls "The Girl" ("my autobiographical twin"), who she refers to in the third person, although the character's facial features are clearly similar to Yeow's. She said: "I guess [The Girl] was developed as a cathartic act, in terms of embracing everything that I did hate about myself physically: the broad nose, the Asian eyes, the broad face".

A further theme behind her recent body of work was Yeow's split with her partner of ten years, with titles including "Was That the Last Goodbye?" and "You Haven't Left and I Miss You Already". Her Mermaid series, with The Girl's clothes fashioned from goldfish scales and fins, is about losing your identity and taking on your partner's.

From her first solo exhibition in 2002, Yeow has been a regular exhibitor at the Hill Smith Gallery. She has also appeared regularly at Libby Edwards Gallery. Yeow's work has been featured or critically reviewed in publications such as Vogue Australia, House & Garden, The Advertiser and mX.

In 2003, Yeow donated an artwork to raise funds for breast cancer research at Flinders Medical Centre. In 2007, Yeow's artwork was used on the cover of the book The Chinese Exotic by Olivia Khoo. She was also a judge for Youthscape 2008. In 2009, Yeow appeared in a glamour shoot for Who magazine.

In 2018, Yeow was the subject of a lengthy radio interview with Richard Fidler on Conversations.

=== Cook and food television ===
Yeow first appeared on the ABC television program Beat the Chef on 13 April 2005. Her auntie Kim Thoo assisted her in the studio kitchen, where she prepared Ying Yang Prawns. She returned to the program on 15 June 2005, assisted by her friend Felicity Electricity. This time she prepared basil thai fried rice and deep-fried dory fillets with green mango.

Yeow was selected in the top 20 contestants for the first series of MasterChef Australia from over 7000 applicants. Competition and eliminations began in May 2009. Yeow was eliminated on 18 June 2009 when she incorrectly guessed the ingredients in minestrone. She was one of three eliminated contestants allowed to return to the program on 1 July 2009. She survived further eliminations to compete in the final on 19 July 2009 against Julie Goodwin. Goodwin won the final, with Yeow runner-up.

Yeow appeared with Matt Preston in the World Chef Showcase in October 2009.

Yeow signed with the Australian Broadcasting Corporation for a cooking series (Poh's Kitchen) and a two-book publishing deal with ABC Books. The production on the series began in November 2009 in her home town of Adelaide. The series was aired from 10 February 2010. Yeow was nominated for the Logie Awards of 2011 in the category of Most Popular New Female Talent. She was again nominated in 2025 for the Gold Logie.

In 2011, the ABC broadcast a second season of Poh's Kitchen, entitled Poh's Kitchen on the Road. Yeow travelled to all Australian states, as well as Singapore and Thailand, to film stories on produce and cooking. A third season premiered on 11 September 2012.

In 2015, Yeow launched a new series, Poh & Co., on SBS. It features various styles of cooking, and also the renovation of Yeow's backyard.

Yeow opened a gourmet food stall, Jamface by Poh, at the Adelaide Showground Farmers' Market. In 2016, Yeow opened a cafe at Adelaide Central Market, also named Jamface by Poh. It closed on 15 October 2019.

In 2019, Yeow returned to MasterChef Australia as a mentor, sharing the position with season eight runner-up Matt Sinclair and season seven winner Billie McKay. In 2020, Yeow returned to MasterChef Australia as a contestant in Back to Win and placed sixth.

In August 2023, it was announced that she would be teaming up with fellow MasterChef contestant Adam Liaw, to host a brand new cooking show on SBS titled Adam & Poh's Great Australian Bites. The show features the hosting duo travelling around Australia to different cities and coastlines and cooking with the locals.

In October 2023, Network 10 announced that Yeow would be joining the forthcoming sixteenth season of MasterChef Australia as a permanent host and judge, alongside fellow new judges Sofia Levin and Jean-Christophe Novelli, as well as returning judge Andy Allen. It came after the sudden death of former judge Jock Zonfrillo and the departure of Melissa Leong.

== Film and television appearances ==
Yeow has appeared in four films: Human Touch (2004), Peaches (2004), Hey, Hey, It's Esther Blueburger (2008) and the Tropfest short film Jackie's Spring Palace (2009). She is also credited as production designer on Jackie's Spring Palace.

Aside from her cooking programs, Yeow had substantial roles in Room 101, Can of Worms and Reality Check. She appeared in the 2013 ABC comedy series It's a Date, along with Dave Lawson.

Yeow said: "I've always just followed what I've enjoyed doing ... in all areas of creativity".

From 2021, Yeow appeared as one of the hosts of the Australian version of Snackmasters.

In 2022, she appeared in the eighth season of I'm a Celebrity...Get Me Out of Here! and, later that year, as a celebrity contestant on the Lego Masters Australia Christmas special.

In 2023, Yeow made a cameo appearance in the sixth episode of Thank God You're Here, through a guest performance as a television cooking show judge.
