= MasterChef Australia series 17 =

MasterChef Australia: Back To Win
- Season 17
- Judges: Andy Allen; Sofia Levin; Jean-Christophe Novelli; Poh Ling Yeow
- No. of contestants: 24
- Winner: Laura Sharrad
- Runner-up: Callum Hann
- No. of episodes: 60

Release
- Original network: Network 10
- Original release: 28 April – 12 August 2025

Series chronology
- ← Previous; Series 16 Next → Series 18

The seventeenth series of the Australian television cooking show MasterChef Australia, also known as MasterChef: Back To Win and MasterChef Australia: Back To Win, premiered on 28 April 2025. It was announced on 16 September 2024 and featured the same four judges as series 16, namely series 4 winner Andy Allen, food writer Sofia Levin, French chef Jean-Christophe Novelli and series 1 runner-up Poh Ling Yeow. Similar to series 12, series 17 featured a Back to Win concept, with 24 contestants from previous series returning for a chance to win the title.

Laura Sharrad won the grand finale on 12 August 2025, defeating Callum Hann 80–73.

Contestants Sarah Todd and Declan Cleary began a relationship during filming of the series, moved in together after elimination and gave birth to twins.

== Contestants ==
The 24 returning contestants were announced on 16 March 2025.

Contestant	Age	State	Occupation	Original Series	Previous Season(s) Placing(s)	Status
Laura Sharrad	29	SA	Chef	Series 6	Runner-up	Winner 12 August
Laura Sharrad	29	SA	Chef	Series 12	Runner-up	Winner 12 August
Callum Hann	35	SA	Chef and restaurateur	Series 2 (Note: Callum also won the Masterchef: All-Stars mini-series)	Runner-up	Runner-up 12 August
Callum Hann	35	SA	Chef and restaurateur	Series 12	4th	Runner-up 12 August
Jamie Fleming	36	QLD	Bar owner	Series 6	4th	Third place 11 August
Depinder Chhibber	33	NSW	Pharmacist and supper club owner	Series 13	8th	Eliminated 4 August
Ben Macdonald	47	NZ	Catering chef	Series 6	6th	Eliminated 29 July
Sarah Todd	37	VIC	Chef and restaurateur	Series 6	9th	Eliminated 27 July
Sarah Todd	37	VIC	Chef and restaurateur	Series 14	Runner-up	Eliminated 27 July
Snezana Calic	42	VIC	Chef	Series 16	15th	Eliminated 20 July
Alana Lowes	44	QLD	Journalist and TV presenter	Series 3	3rd	Eliminated 13 July
Audra Morrice	54	NSW	TV host and judge	Series 4	3rd	Eliminated 6 July
Andre Ursini	44	SA	Restaurateur and business owner	Series 1	7th	Eliminated 1 July
Declan Cleary	27	NSW	Carpenter	Series 15	3rd	Eliminated 29 June
Theo Loizou	39	VIC	Electrician	Series 15	4th	Eliminated 24 June
Beau Cook	40	VIC	Firefighter and cookbook author	Series 4	8th	Eliminated 22 June
Samira El Khafir	39	VIC	Businesswoman and cafe owner	Series 5	3rd	Eliminated 15 June
Darrsh Clarke	33	VIC	Chef and management consultant	Series 16	6th	Eliminated 8 June
Tim Bone	39	VIC	Sandwich business owner	Series 11	4th	Eliminated 1 June
Rue Mupedzi	31	WA	Catering chef	Series 15	7th	Eliminated 27 May
Rhiannon Anderson	48	QLD	Business owner	Series 15	Runner-up	Eliminated 25 May
Jimmy Wong	58	NSW	Food photographer and content creator	Series 8	19th	Eliminated 20 May
Matt Hopcraft	53	VIC	Dentist and associate professor	Series 7	6th	Eliminated 18 May
Steph De Sousa	52	NSW	Content creator and caterer	Series 11	12th	Eliminated 11 May
Savindri Perera	31	SA	Private chef and caterer	Series 16	3rd	Eliminated 6 May
Cath Collins	56	VIC	Food business owner	Series 15	5th	Eliminated 4 May
Pete Campbell	40	NSW	Chef	Series 13	Runner-up	Withdrew 30 April

== Guests ==
Week	Guest	Challenge
1 (Gordon Ramsay Week)	Gordon Ramsay	Team service challenge
1 (Gordon Ramsay Week)	Gordon Ramsay	Keeping Up with Gordon challenge
2 (Legends Week)	Peter Gilmore	Mystery box
2 (Legends Week)	Kirsten Tibballs	Pressure test
2 (Legends Week)	Shannon Bennett	Immunity challenge
3	Curtis Stone	Immunity challenge
4	Steven He	Pressure test
5	Josh Niland	Elimination challenge
5	Ixta Belfrage	Mystery box
5	Blayne Bertoncello	Pressure test
6 (Viral Week)	Sooshi Mango	Mystery box
6 (Viral Week)	John Demetrios	Pressure test
6 (Viral Week)	Andy Cooks	Elimination challenge
8 (Sweet Week)	Junda Khoo	Elimination challenge
9 (Aussie Icons Week)	Nornie Bero	Mystery box
9 (Aussie Icons Week)	Curtis Stone	Elimination challenge
9 (Aussie Icons Week)	Curtis Stone	Immunity challenge
9 (Aussie Icons Week)	Maggie Beer	Elimination challenge
10	Philip Khoury	Pressure test
12	Michael Wilson	Pressure test
13	Hugh Allen	Service challenge
14	Julie Goodwin	Elimination challenge
14	Nat Thaipun	Elimination challenge
14	Vaughan Mabee	Elimination challenge
16 (Grand Finale Week)	Miko Aspiras	Pressure test

== Elimination chart ==
No.	Week	1				2			3		4		5		6			7		8			9			10			11	12		13		14	Finals	Grand Finale	
No.	Mystery Box Challenge Winner	None				Audra; Depinder; Rue; Theo			None		Laura; Theo		Callum; Jamie; Laura		Andre; Ben; Laura; Snezana			Alana; Andre; Audra; Beau; Callum; Depinder; Theo		Andre; Beau; Callum; Laura			Callum; Laura; Snezana			Sarah			Callum; Jamie	Callum; Jamie; Snezana		Ben; Callum; Depinder; Laura		Depinder	None	None	
No.	Immunity Challenge	Ben (Immunity Pin)		Audra; Darrsh; Depinder; Laura; Sav		Alana; Andre; Depinder; Theo			Andre; Ben; Jimmy; Snezana		Andre; Beau; Ben; Callum; Declan; Depinder		Andre; Callum; Depinder; Laura		Andre; Ben; Laura; Snezana	Andre; Declan; Jamie		Alana; Andre; Audra; Beau; Callum; Depinder; Theo	Declan; Laura; Sarah	Andre; Beau; Callum; Laura	Audra; Callum; Declan; Sarah; Theo		Ben; Depinder; Jamie; Laura			Alana; Callum; Jamie			Ben; Depinder	Callum; Jamie; Snezana	Laura	Ben; Callum; Depinder; Laura	Laura	Depinder	None	None	
No.	Elimination Challenge Winner	Jimmy; Laura; Rhiannon				Audra; Laura			Beau; Depinder; Jamie		Laura; Sarah		Beau; Jamie; Samira; Sarah		Alana; Audra; Depinder; Laura			None		Depinder; Sarah; Snezana			Alana; Callum; Depinder; Sarah			Ben; Jamie; Laura; Sarah			Sarah; Snezana	Callum; Depinder		Ben; Depinder		Callum	Callum; Laura	None	
1	Laura	Team Lose		Top 5	Top 3	IN	IN	Team Win 2	IN	Team Win 1	Top 2	Top 2	Top 3	Team Win	Top 4	IN	Top 4	IN	Team Win	Top 4	IMM		Top 3	Top 4	IMM	IN	Team Lose 1	Top 4	Btm 2	IN	IMM	Top 3	IMM	Btm 3	IN	Top 2	WINNER
2	Callum	Team Win		IN	Btm 18	Top 5	Top 6	DNP 2	IN	Team Win 2	IN	Team Win	Top 3	Team Win	Top 6	IN	Btm 4	Top 2	IMM	Top 4	Top 4	IMM	Top 3	IN	Top 4	Top 3	Team Win	IMM	IMM	Top 3	Btm 5	IMM		WIN	IN	Top 2	Runner-up
3	Jamie	Team 2nd		Top 7	Btm 18	IN	IN	Team Lose	IN	Top 3	IN	Team Lose 2	Top 3	Top 4	Top 6	Top 3	Btm 9	IN	Btm 2	IN	IN	Btm 8	Btm 2	Top 4	Btm 6	IN	Team Win	Top 4	IMM	IMM		IN	Btm 2	Btm 3	WIN	3rd	Eliminated (Ep 59)
4	Depinder	Team 2nd		Top 5	Btm 18	Top 4	Top 4	DNP 1	IN	Top 3	IN	Team Win	IN	Team Win	IN	IN	Top 4	Top 2	IMM	IN	IN	Top 3	IN	Top 4	Top 4	IN	Team Lose 1	Btm 4	IMM	IN	Btm 5	Top 3	Btm 4	IMM	Elim	Eliminated (Ep 56)	
5	Ben	Team Win	I.P.	IN	Btm 18	Btm 4	IN	DNP 2	Top 4	IMM	Btm 4	Team Win	IN	Btm 2	Top 4	IN	Btm 5/Imm.	IN	Team Lose 3	IN	IN	Btm 8	Btm 4	Top 4	Btm 2	IN	Team Lose 2	Top 4	IMM	IN	Btm 3	Top 4	Btm 4	Elim	Eliminated (Ep 54)		
6	Sarah	Team 2nd		IN	DNP	Btm 3	IN	DNP 1	IN	Team Win 2	IN	Top 2	Btm 4	Top 4	IN	IN	Btm 9	IN	Team Win	IN	Top 4	Top 3	Btm 4	IN	Top 4	WIN	Team Lose 2	Top 4	Btm 4	Top 4	Btm 3	IN	Elim	Eliminated (Ep 52)			
7	Snezana	Team 2nd		IN	Btm 18	IN	IN	Team Lose	Top 4	Btm 3	Top 5	Team Lose 1	IN	Team Lose 2	Top 4	IMM		IN	Team Lose 2	IN	IN	Top 3	Top 3	IN	Btm 6	Btm 3	Team Lose 2	Btm 2	Btm 4	Top 3	Elim	Eliminated (Ep 48)					
8	Alana	Team 2nd		IN	Btm 18	IN	Top 4	DNP 1	IN	Team Win 1	IN	Team Lose 2	Top 4	Team Lose 3	IN	IN	Top 4	Top 3	Team Lose 3	IN	IN	Btm 8	IN	IN	Top 4	Btm 3	Team Win	Btm 4	Elim	Eliminated (Ep 44)							
9	Audra	Team Win		Top 5	IMM	Top 4	IN	Team Win 1	IN	Team Win 2	Top 5	Team Lose 1	Btm 3	Team Lose 1	IN	IN	Top 4	Top 7	Team Lose 2	IN	Top 4	Btm 8	Top 5	IN	Btm 6	Top 3	Team Lose 1	Elim	Eliminated (Ep 40)								
10	Andre	Team Lose		Top 7	Btm 18	IN	Top 4	Team Lose	Top 4	Team Lose 1	IN	Team Win	IN	Team Win	Top 4	Top 3	Btm 2	Top 7	Team Lose 1	Top 4	IN	Btm 8	IN	IN	Btm 6	Elim	Eliminated (Ep 38)										
11	Declan	Team Lose		IN	Btm 18	IN	IN	DNP 2	IN	Team Win 2	IN	Team Win	IN	Team Lose 2	IN	Top 3	IMM	IN	Team Win	Top 5	Top 5	Btm 8	Top 5	IN	Elim	Eliminated (Ep 36)											
12	Theo	Team 2nd		IN	Btm 18	Top 4	Top 4	IMM	IN	Team Lose 1	Top 2	Team Lose 2	IN	Team Lose 1	IN	IN	Btm 9	Top 7	Btm 4	IN	Top 4	Btm 2	Elim	Eliminated (Ep 34)													
13	Beau	Team Lose		IN	Btm 18	IN	IN	DNP 1	IN	Top 3	IN	Team Win	IN	Top 4	IN	IN	Btm 9	Top 7	Btm 4	Top 4	IN	Elim	Eliminated (Ep 32)														
14	Samira	Team 2nd		IN	Btm 3	IN	IN	DNP 1	IN	Team Win 1	Top 5	Team Lose 1	IN	Top 4	IN	IN	Btm 4	IN	Elim	Eliminated (Ep 28)																	
15	Darrsh	Team Win		Top 5	Btm 18	Btm 3	IN	DNP 2	IN	Team Win 2	IN	Btm 3	IN	Team Lose 1	IN	IN	Elim	Eliminated (Ep 24)																			
16	Tim	Team Lose		IN	Btm 3	IN	IN	Team Lose	IN	Team Lose 2	Btm 3	Btm 3	Btm 2	Elim	Eliminated (Ep 20)																						
17	Rue	Team Win		IN	Btm 18	Top 4	IN	DNP 2	IN	Btm 3	Btm 3	Team Lose 1	Elim	Eliminated (Ep 18)																							
18	Rhiannon	Team Win		IN	Top 3	IN	Top 6	DNP 2	IN	Team Win 1	IN	Elim	Eliminated (Ep 16)																								
19	Jimmy	Team 2nd		IN	Top 3	IN	IN	DNP 1	Top 4	Team Win 1	Elim	Eliminated (Ep 14)																									
20	Matt	Team Win		IN	Btm 18	IN	IN	Btm 2	IN	Elim	Eliminated (Ep 12)																										
21	Steph	Team Lose		IN	Btm 18	IN	IN	Elim	Eliminated (Ep 8)																												
22	Sav	Team Lose		Top 5	Btm 18	Elim	Eliminated (Ep 6)																														
23	Cath	Team Win		IN	Elim	Eliminated (Ep 4)																															
24	Pete	Team Lose		Left	Left (Ep 3)																																
	Eliminated	None		Pete	Cath	Sav	Steph		Matt		Jimmy	Rhiannon	Rue	Tim	Darrsh			Samira		Beau			Theo	Declan		Andre	Audra		Alana	Snezana		Sarah		Ben	Depinder	Jamie	Callum
	Eliminated	None		Pete	Cath	Sav	Steph		Matt		Jimmy	Rhiannon	Rue	Tim	Darrsh			Samira		Beau			Theo	Declan		Andre	Audra		Alana	Snezana		Sarah		Ben	Depinder	Jamie	Laura

== Episodes and ratings ==
Ep#/Wk-Ep#	Original airdate	Episode title / event	Viewers (national reach & total)	Nightly ranking
Week 1 (Gordon Ramsay Week)
1/01-1	Monday, 28 April 2025	Series Premiere: Gordon Ramsay's Team Service Challenge — The Top 24 were split into three teams of eight, with the three contestants who previously competed on MasterChef twice being named team captains: Callum (green team), Sarah (blue) and Laura (burgundy). Each team had to cook a two-course meal for 30 guests in a two-hour service challenge set by this week's guest chef Gordon Ramsay. Gordon revealed two focus ingredients: carrots and corn. Each team needed to feature one of these in a main course and the other in a dessert. The green team produced a beef rump cap with carrot prepared three ways. The burgundy team prepared a porchetta dish with maple-roasted carrots on a carrot puree. The blue team made a kingfish and sweet corn chowder, struggling with the cooking of the fish. For dessert, the burgundy team's dish was disjointed, though their corn ice cream was a success. The green team made a pavlova with corn ice cream and passionfruit curd that the judges admired. The blue team prepared a carrot halwa parfait that the judges also enjoyed. The green team won the challenge, earning the chance to compete for an advantage in the competition.	1,392,000/ 676,009	#8
2/01-2	Tuesday, 29 April 2025	Keep Up with Gordon Challenge — The eight members of the green team needed to keep up with Gordon in a two-dish challenge, with the prize being the season's only immunity pin. The main course was caramelized duck breast with parsnip puree, endive and a port wine sauce, and the dessert was sticky toffee pudding. Gordon disqualified Rue and Cath: the former injured herself twice, while the latter had fallen too far behind. The two contestants who came closest to matching Gordon's dishes were Ben and Callum, who both cooked their duck perfectly and had very successful desserts. The judges gave the win, and the immunity pin, to Ben.	1,174,000/ 602,000	#12
3/01-3	Wednesday, 30 April 2025	Late Night Snack Immunity Challenge — The judges announced that Pete had left the competition for personal reasons. The contestants competed for the first time this season as individuals with their own choice of dish. They had 75 minutes to prepare an elevated version of their favourite late-night snack using Gordon's favourite snack, beans on toast, as inspiration. The winner would be safe from the upcoming elimination and also have their dish appear on one of Gordon's restaurant menus. The judges complimented several dishes, including Darrsh's s'mores with native Australian flavours, Audra's “magic of a happy marriage” Japanese/Indian cross between takoyaki and vada, Depinder's Aslam butter chicken, Sav's smashed Sri Lankan pork-filled pastries and Laura's Vegemite on toast dessert. The judges awarded immunity to Audra.	1,139,000/ 633,000	#11
Week 2 (Legends Week)
4/02-1	Sunday, 4 May 2025	Food Journey Elimination Challenge — The judges announced that Sarah was unwell and as a result, she must compete in Tuesday's pressure test. The contestants besides Audra had 90 minutes to cook a dish demonstrating their progression as a cook. The judges were impressed by Rhiannon's coral trout wontons, Jimmy's toothfish with tomato dashi, and Laura's lobster and leek doppio ravioli. Tim's 'Forrest Gump'-inspired barbecued beef cheek toastie was overly sweet, while Samira's yogurt, garlic and coriander soup with lamb shank was underwhelming in flavour. Cath burned her Japanese mushrooms, causing them to become bitter. She became the first contestant to be eliminated from the competition this year.	1,265,000/ 604,000	#11
5/02-2	Monday, 5 May 2025	Peter Gilmore Mystery Box Challenge — Legends Week began with a mystery box challenge set by Peter Gilmore, who filled the box with a variety of his favourite ingredients, with many suitable for either sweet or savoury cooking. The contestants were given 75 minutes to cook a dish using at least one ingredient from the box, as well as the under-bench pantry staples. The judges complimented Rue for her Black Forest cake-inspired dessert, Theo for his squid fritters, Audra for her chiffon cake roll and Depinder for her gochujang choux buns. Sav struggled to clean and prepare her baby squid, and created too small a dish for the judges to appreciate all of the parts. Darrsh did not fully grill his chicken, so the judges could not eat it. Ben's squid with fettuccine lacked flavour. These three cooks were sent into tomorrow's pressure test, along with Sarah, who had missed the previous elimination due to illness.	1,156,000/ 625,000	#11
6/02-3	Tuesday, 6 May 2025	Pressure Test: Kirsten Tibballs' Coffee Caviar Tin — Ben, Darrsh, Sarah and Sav had 3 1/4 hours to re-create Kirsten Tibballs' chocolate and coffee caviar dessert, featuring coffee pearls placed in a tempered chocolate container modelled on a caviar tin. Sav initially missed the step of chilling the tempered chocolate tins before unmoulding, so she had to re-temper and re-mould, which caused her to rush, leading to a messy presentation. Ben finished his dish early, and it was near flawless. Darrsh's caviar tin was rough on its edges, but the judges complimented his other technical work. Sarah's dish was messy in presentation, but she had excellent chocolate work. The judges congratulated Ben for his success in the challenge, and eliminated Sav.	1,092,000/ 591,000	#12
7/02-4	Wednesday, 7 May 2025	Shannon Bennett's 20-Minute Immunity Challenge — Shannon Bennett was cooking in the MasterChef kitchen when the contestants entered. He presented fried scallops with black pudding and pea puree, all cooked in 20 minutes. He challenged the contestants to make a dish of their own in 20 minutes; the best would win immunity from the upcoming elimination. Jean-Christophe was inspired to cook as well; he made seafood marinière with a camembert sauce. The judges complimented Andre's ajo blanco with squid ink crisp, Depinder's bream steamed in a banana leaf, Alana's fried flounder with zhoug, and Theo's loukoumades, for which Theo won immunity.	1,198,000/ 625,000	#10
Week 3
8/03-1	Sunday, 11 May 2025	Two-Round Elimination Challenge: One-Inch Cube — The contestants other than Theo faced the one-inch cube taste test, with a twist: they were divided into three teams, each with only one person tasting, blindfolded, for their team. The first person to give an incorrect answer sent their team into round two. Jamie, Audra and Laura were the tasters. Jamie mis-identified strawberry as plum, and his team went into round two. They had 75 minutes to make a dish using round one's ingredients, which did not include herbs, condiments or sugar, but did include flour. Andre's Twisties-inspired trofie, with the dough flavoured with corn and carrot and served with lime beurre noisette, impressed the judges, as did Snezana's koromač and Jamie's duck à l'orange. Tim successfully crisped the skin on his roasted pork belly with apple and fennel sauce and parsnip puree. Matt's potato and bacon tortellini with mushroom cappuccino broth was one-note in flavour. However, Steph's air-fried pork belly with celeriac slaw and belacan caramel sauce was too fatty and unbalanced, and she was eliminated.	1,069,000/ 568,000	#11
9/03-2	Monday, 12 May 2025	Mystery Fridge Invention Test — The contestants were asked to create a dish using leftover ingredients in one of the judges' fridges. Jean-Christophe's fridge contained leftover rinds, Poh's contained pastry off-cuts, Andy's contained herb stalks, and Sofia's contained pickling juice. Andre's orange and Parmesan tortellini, Ben's pan-roasted quail with pancetta, Jimmy's Asian scampi salad and Snezana's pasta veil were the best, and they advanced to the immunity challenge. Andre's dish was dish of the day winning him a $5,000 voucher from Coles.	1,298,000/ 664,000	#11
10/03-3	Tuesday, 13 May 2025	Immunity Challenge: Curtis Stone — Andre, Ben, Jimmy and Snezana had to replicate Curtis Stone's pork loin with citrus beurre monté and pistachio dukka after being given a demonstration of how to cook the pork. Andre had trouble with the carrot puree and Jimmy's fennel was undercooked. Ben and Snezana's dishes were near-perfect, and Ben won immunity.	1,121,000/ 625,000	#12
11/03-4	Wednesday, 14 May 2025	Jean-Christophe's French Service Immunity Challenge — The contestants were divided into four teams of five. Each were tasked to create a two-course meal for 60 teachers; a main and a dessert, either one of which needing to have a twist to the classic dishes. The green team led by Alana produced a lobster bisque and a tarte tatin which were both well received. The blue team's (with Audra as captain) bouillabaisse prepared by Sarah, and Darrsh's Paris-Brest also were enjoyed. While the brown team's (with Theo as captain) Paris-Brest was hailed by the judges as the standout dessert of the day, their boeuf en croute was let down by the overpowering black garlic paste. While the gray team led by Beau received praise for their coq au vin, the lemon myrtle ice cream that came with their tarte tatin was criticised for being too far forward. As a result, the green and the blue teams were awarded immunity for the next elimination, joining Ben (who won immunity in the previous challenge).	980,000/ 538,000	#14
Week 4
12/04-1	Sunday, 18 May 2025	Finishing Flair Elimination Challenge — The losing team contestants, apart from Ben, were given a demonstration by the judges how to serve dishes with theatre. The contestants had 75 minutes to cook a dish with theatre presentation. Jamie's pear-comte and macadamia cheese board -nspired dish with calvados clouds received rave reviews from the judges, as did Depinder's raj kachori and Beau's Anzac-inspired dessert. Snezana's chicken liver parfait, lavosh bread, pickles, and chutney were praised for their flavour but her "karate chop" theatre lacked the drama needed to fit the brief. Rue's dark matter dessert also had good flavours but her dry ice theatre lacked drama and the chocolate was not tempered correctly and didn't crack. However, for Matt's Anzac biscuit bomb Alaska, the meringue was split affecting the flambe technique resulting in the flavour being overly boozy, resulting in him being eliminated.	1,042,000/ 614,000	#11
13/04-2	Monday, 19 May 2025	Wrapped Up Mystery Box Challenge — The week's mystery box challenge contained ingredients used to cook food in a wrapped technique, in which the contestants had 75 minutes to create a dish wrapped in one of these edible (or cookable) coverings. The top dishes of the day were Laura's paper bark and lemon myrtle-wrapped coral trout with Warrigal greens and smoked sauce and Theo's dolmades. Audra's chicken wrapped in pandan leaf, Samira's Egyptian mahshi rice and herb rolls and Snezana's stuffed cabbage rolls also received positive reviews. Ben, while poaching his wrapped barramundi in vine leaf in a water bath, turned off the bath resulting in his fish being undercooked. Rue was overambitious, cooking a barramundi en papillote and did not have her timings right resulting in her dish being raw so the judges couldn't taste it. Jimmy decided to cook otak-otak but the types of fish he chose to use resulted in the flavour being overly fishy and lacking texture. Tim decided to make beef bulgogi cabbage rolls with gochujang mayo sauce but then deep fried them, destroying the freshness. Having cooked the bottom four dishes, Ben, Jimmy, Rue and Tim were sent to the pressure test.	1,255,000/ 631,000	#12
14/04-3	Tuesday, 20 May 2025	Pressure Test: Steven He's Balloon Puppy Cake — Ben, Jimmy, Rue and Tim had three hours to re-create Steven He's balloon puppy cake, a white chocolate-tempered puppy on top of a layered entremet with chocolate sponge, shortbread, sour cherry compote, and white chocolate-black tea ganache. For the third time Ben was the strongest in the pressure test and had near-flawless presentation, layering of the entremet and flavours. While Jimmy's cake and crumb were delicious, his compote was over-reduced and too thick, and his tea ganache lacked flavour. Tim did not cut his cherries in half, resulting in the compote not being even, but he received compliments for his tempering skills and ganache flavour. Even though Rue's chocolate was nicely tempered, the top of her chocolate puppy fell over in the last few seconds and because of that, she also didn't cut her cherries in half, and didn't add enough shortbread, which completely threw out the balance of the dish in both flavour and texture. Although Jimmy, Rue and Tim produced dishes with flaws, there was one marked difference between their plates and that was the most crucial pressure point of the dish, the chocolate puppy. The judges felt that Jimmy had missed the brief, and he was eliminated.	1,119,000/ 628,000	#11
15/04-4	Wednesday, 21 May 2025	Squire's Landing Pub Service Immunity Challenge — The contestants arrived at a pub beside Sydney Harbour for a service challenge and were divided into three teams of six. They had three hours to create two courses of elevated pub food; they had a choice of starters: wings, salt and pepper squid, or nachos. mains: chicken parmigiana, roast of the day, or fish and chips. However, only half of each teams were to be in the kitchen at one time. Three cooks start, and then the other three will come in to finish and plate. For the orange team (starting with Callum, Declan and Beau, and finishing with Andre, Depinder and Ben), the starter of salt and pepper squid was well received and the main of baked fish wings with zucchini chips was declared the best pub meal Andy had ever eaten. For the blue team (Jamie, Darrsh and Rhiannon, then Laura, Theo and Alana), their starter chicken wings with roasted olives and parsley salad and main of barramundi, cider tartare sauce with a side of crispy roasted potatoes with creme fraiche and salmon roe received rave reviews from the judges. The green team (Samira, Snez and Sarah, then Tim, Audra and Rue) didn't get to a great start. They did not scale the snapper and had a miscommunication of the quail cooking time with Tim. While both the starter of snapper wings with harissa sauce, fried potato and grilled lemon and the main of roast quail with baba ghanoush were all praised for flavour, the amount of scales on the snapper and the over-cooking of the quail sent the green team to elimination. Despite strong dishes from the blue team, it was the orange team that won the challenge and are immune from Sunday's elimination.	1,054,000/ 582,000	#12
Week 5
16/05-1	Sunday, 25 May 2025	Josh Niland Surf & Turf Elimination Challenge — The green and blue teams were shown how guest chef Josh Niland butchered a yellowfin tuna similar to beef. They had 75 minutes of deliver a re-imagined surf and turf dish. The judges agreed that the cook overwhelmed Rhiannon, Tim and Darrsh and there were flaws in every part of their dishes. Rhiannon's lobster wontons in beef broth had underwhelming sauce, the lobster was overcooked, and it was a fault in the texture of the wontons. While Tim's meatballs were tasty, the judges couldn't taste any marron flavour. Although Darrsh presented a sweet version of surf and turf, there wasn't enough refinement. While the judges felt that the bottom 3 dishes had flaws, they felt that Rhiannon's dish failed to meet the brief more than the others and she was eliminated.	1,179,000/ 614,000	#10
17/05-2	Monday, 26 May 2025	Ixta Belfrage Mystery Box — The mystery box challenge was set by guest chef Ixta Belfrage. It contained ingredients from her favourite cuisines, with which the contestants had 75 minutes to cook a dish. A second mystery box was revealed 30 minutes into the cook: it contained chilies which the contestants had to use in their cook. The top dishes of the day were Callum's burnt pineapple and salted coconut parfait with jalapeño granita and basil oil, Jamie's bonito tostada, pineapple and hibiscus, and Laura's prawn scarpinocc and bisque. Alana's basil olive oil ice cream and lime feuilletine with hibiscus chili broth also received praise. However, Audra's cake was dense and undercooked, and the judges also thought her dish was too sweet. Sarah's mango parfait was icy; her hibiscus tea syrup made her crumb soggy, and Andy and Ixta felt that her dish lack cohesive. Tim's desert island prawns were not cooked well enough for the judges to eat. Rue's coconut and lime parfait were icy and uneven, and her tropical granita was more of a sorbet. Having cooked the bottom 4 dishes, Audra, Rue, Sarah and Tim were sent to the pressure test.	1,083,000/ 585,000	#13
18/05-3	Tuesday, 27 May 2025	Pressure Test: Blayne Bertoncello's Strawberry and Sourdough with Elderflower and Balsamic — Audra, Rue, Sarah and Tim had two hours to re-create Blayne Bertoncello's variation of sourdough and strawberry with elderflower and balsamic, which is a strawberry sorbet with sourdough pastry cream, strawberry gum emulsion, elderflower crisp and balsamic gel. However, they had to re-create the dish five times, one plate per judge. Sarah had no issues throughout the cook, and her effort was the closest to the original. Audra was focusing on following the recipe, fell behind at the start and had trouble with her strawberry gum emulsion. She fixed it and recovered quickly despite her balsamic gel being too liquid. The judges thought her sorbet was the best. Tim rushed through the cook to the point that he didn't spread his sourdough tuile over one baking sheet instead of two making it too thick. Though he tried to fix the gum emulsion it split, effecting the flavour. However, Rue struggled the most. Her gum emulsion also split, and her pastry cream was too thick and overcooked, resulting in her being eliminated.	1,079,000/ 599,000	#11
19/05-4	Wednesday, 28 May 2025	Potato Team Relay Challenge — The 16 remaining contestants were divided into four teams and asked to cook a dish featuring potatoes at least twice in a team relay, given 20 minutes each to cook and 30 seconds to transfer information to the next cook. Callum, who was captain of the purple team, decided to cook potato noodles, charred potato skin broth, whiting and pipis. Jamie (red team) decided to make a Lancashire hotpot. Ben (turquoise team) opted to cook pan fried whiting with potato puree and crispy courgette and Darrsh (yellow team) selected a pork chop with hasselback potato, pomme puree, pickle radishes and fennel with a cider jus. The turquoise team's whiting was praised, but Declan failed to communicate the brief to Tim who also forgot to tell Snezana about the potato chips: with only one element featuring potato the team was disqualified. The red team's Lancashire hotpot was more of a dish of lamb cutlets with potato three ways, honeyed carrots, because the other team members didn't know what a Lancashire hotpot is. While they were praised for using potatoes three ways, the lamb was over, and the mash was not smooth enough. While the yellow team's dish was praised for the cooking of the pork chop and the hasselback potatoes, it was the purple team's potato noodle dish that the judges thought was the most creative, making the purple team the winners of the challenge and gaining them immunity from elimination.	914,000/ 483,000	#16
Week 6 (Viral Week)
20/06-1	Sunday, 1 June 2025	Butter Elimination Challenge — The 3 losing teams had 75 minutes to cook a dish that heroed butter. Samira's fateh jaj with vermicelli noodles, Sarah's butter chicken with roti butter, Jamie's brown butter poached kingfish squash and sea greens, and Beau's marron with parsnip puree, nduja and anchovy butter were announced as the top dishes of the day by the judges. Despite knowing his dish wasn't perfect Ben opted not to play his immunity pin, with his dish of lamb poached in buerre noisette with freekah tabbouleh, anchovy butter and parsnip puree. While the lamb was cooked perfectly the rest of dish was criticized. Tim tried to achieve a confit duck in 75 minutes along with a celeriac puree, miso mushrooms, and asparagus. Like Ben, Tim's dish was criticized for its textures and flavours, but it was his duck that was tough and not rendered, resulting in Tim being eliminated.	1,154,000/ 620,000	#7
21/06-2	Monday, 2 June 2025	Sooshi Mango Mystery Box — The mystery box challenge required the contestants to cook an Italian dish in 75 minutes for "nonnas". They were unaware that the social media trio Sooshi Mango was watching them cook. Despite strong dishes from Callum and Jamie, the top four dishes of the day were Laura's chestnut garganelli with braised veal osso buco, rosemary & peas, Snez's baccala and fregola soup, Ben's salt cod croquettes with sugo and basil mayonnaise and Andre's buttermilk ricotta gnocchi, charred cucumber consommé and borage oil. Andre, Ben, Laura and Snez advanced to the first immunity challenge of the week.	1,292,000/ 714,000	#10
22/06-3	Tuesday, 3 June 2025	Immunity Pressure Test: John Demetrios’ Chocolate Meteor — Andre, Ben, Laura and Snez had to replicate John Demetrios's chocolate meteor. A chocolate shell covering a white chocolate shell, a base of chocolate biscuit, then caramel and milk chocolate mousse, cherry compote, and dark chocolate and almond parfait, which was then to be melted by fiery whiskey. The contestants had to use the balloon method to create the chocolate meteor. Both Ben and Andre struggled to get the balloon out meaning they couldn't melt the chocolate and Andre also overwhipped the cream of the parfait. Laura and Snez's dishes were near-perfect, and Snez won immunity.	1,105,000/ 619,000	#12
23/06-4	Wednesday, 4 June 2025	Cold Meats Sandwich Immunity Challenge — The contestants besides Snez had to compete in a two-round immunity challenge. For the first round they had 45 minutes to make the ultimate deli sandwich featuring at least one of the deli meats from the selection on the counter. Andre's smoked pecorino cream, eggplant caponata, smoked prosciutto and mortadella sandwich, Declan's panko crumb cheese sandwich with hot honey sauce, pickles, ham and Jamie's croque madame were the top three, advancing to round two. For the second round Andre, Declan and Jamie had 60 minutes to make a mash-up of two dishes inspired by the cronut. Andre's caprese dolce didn't hit the mark, and Jamie's Korean fried chicken tacos while tasty didn't have enough Korean flavour to hit the brief. Ultimately it was Declan's lobster éclair that impressed the judges, making him immune from Sunday's elimination along with Snez.	1,087,000/ 596,000	#11
Week 7
24/07-1	Sunday, 8 June 2025	Andy Cooks' Elimination Challenge — The contestants had to compete in a two-round elimination challenge. For the first round, they had 45 minutes to create a dish with a cheese pull. The judges, including Andy, praised Alana's knafeh cigars, Audra's curry chicken kataifi, Depinder's cheesy lamb samosas, and Laura's Sicilian arancini. Andre, Ben, Callum, Samira and Darrsh missed the mark, which required them to cook in the second round, where they had 75 minutes to bring the judges their perfect slice. Ben's plan was to cook a Scotch Egg infused with soy sauce, but he decided to play his immunity pin. Callum's strawberry sorbet and strawberry gum ice cream with a hidden basil oil was questioned by the judges, but in the end it worked and he was saved, as well as Samira's maqluba whose flip was perfect. Andre's French Onion Soup chawanmushi was criticized because he didn't include a satisfactory cut even though the soup's flavours were highly praised. However, it was Darrsh who was eliminated because the Choux pastry for his choux tower didn't rise properly and he burned the dough.	937,000/ 530,000	#11
25/07-2	Monday, 9 June 2025	Lee Kum Kee Mystery Box — The mystery box challenge required the contestants to compete in pairs to create a dish in 75 minutes using a sauce from Lee Kum Kee; the best dish from each dual will compete in tomorrow's immunity pressure test. Sarah and Theo had sesame oil; while the judges praised Sarah's steamed snapper with sesame and snapper broth, it was Theo's sesame semifreddo that wowed the judges. Andre and Samira had oyster sauce; while both Andre's prawn and scallop-stuffed chicken wings with oyster sauce glaze, oyster sauce and soy mayo and Samira's oyster sauce marinated spatchcock received positive reviews, the judges felt that Andre's technique of stuffing added more complexity to his dish. Beau and Jamie had XO sauce; despite a more innovative concept Jamie's crab and XO “churros” with XO caramel sauce was too sweet and lost the crab flavour, while Beau's prawn noodles with XO sauce made much more sense. Alana and Snez had chilli bean sauce; Alana'sTurkish lamb manti in chilli buttermilk sauce and coriander oil received positive comments, while Snez's Singapore chilli crab was criticised as the elements don't work together. Audra and Ben had hoisin sauce; while the judges saw potential in Ben's coconut rice pudding with caramel, blackberries and dark chocolate, Audra's hoisin-glazed duck with pancakes highlighted the sauce perfectly. Callum and Declan had soy sauce; Declan's attempt at hand-pulled noodles with soy glazed pork was commended but the noodles were inconsistent in texture, while Callum's duck soup with soy broth was perfect. Depinder and Laura made desserts with chilli oil; despite Laura's coconut yoghurt and lime sorbet with chargrilled pineapple and chilli caramel received rave reviews, it was Depinder's chilli oil ice cream with coconut sago pudding and lychee lime granita that had the winning edge. Alana, Andre, Audra, Beau, Callum, Depinder and Theo are the top 7 cooking in the pressure test.	1,241,000/ 663,000	#12
26/07-3	Tuesday, 10 June 2025	Immunity Pressure Test: Ice Cream — The 7 winning contestants from the last mystery box challenge have to create their own pressure test in two hours, inspired by the different flavours of Conossieur ice cream. Alana-chocolate & hazelnut, Andre-cookies & cream, Audra-caramel honey & macadamia, Beau-honeycomb & Australian honey, Callum-cafe grande, Depinder-matcha green tea & white chocolate and Theo-white chocolate & raspberry. Some of the contestants have mixed reviews about their dishes. With Alana's chocolate, hazelnut & blackberries with tarragon oil, Callum's lion's mane & coffee ice-Cream with chocolate, Mandarin & almond and Depinder's layered cake with flavours of matcha, white chocolate & berries receiving the highest praise from the judges. The judges announced that Callum & Depinder were the winner's and are immune from Sunday's elimination.	1,133,000/ 648,000	#12
27/07-4	Wednesday, 11 June 2025	Team Service Challenge: Dough — The contestants apart from Callum and Depinder had to compete in a service challenge in the MasterChef garden and were divided into four teams of three. They had four hours to prepare two types of doughy dishes, one savoury and one sweet, for 100 customers. For the turquoise team (Laura, Sarah and captain Declan), the pizza frittata with sugo, salumi, XO and straciatella was well received. While they had a problem with the praline, Laura managed to rectify it and their choux buns with nutella crème patissiere served with salty hazelnut praline and macerated strawberries received rave reviews. For the orange team (Andre, Beau and captain Theo), their gnocchi porcini bolognese received rave reviews from the judges, who commended Andre's technique of making gnocchi. Their sourdough doughnut with lemon curd and meringue received positive comments, though Poh thought the flavour was too sweet. For the pink team (Alana, Samira and captain Ben) their slow-cooked lamb pita with sumac onions and pickled chilli received positive reviews. But for their Chinese doughnut with chocolate and pistachio, using baking powder instead of yeast affected the texture being more cakey than doughy. For the yellow team (Audra, Snez and captain Jamie) their pan-seared prawns with cold noodles and Asian dressing was rushed and off balance, though Snez's lemon lime cream bun received positive comments. For delivering two outstanding dishes the turquoise team won the challenge and are immune from Sunday's elimination.	1,241,000/ 609,000	#9
Week 8 (Sweet Week)
28/08-1	Sunday, 15 June 2025	Junda Khoo's Laksa Taste-Test Elimination Challenge — The 3 losing teams had to compete in a two-round elimination challenge set by guest judge Junda Khoo. For round one, the contestants had to taste his laksa bomb dumplings and take turns in identifying one of the forty ingredients in the dish. Samira, Jamie, Theo and Beau had incorrect guesses and had to compete in round two, where they had 75 minutes to create a dish using the laksa ingredients. Beau's lemongrass chicken with satay sauce and roti bread wowed the judges, especially since he used candlenuts in his satay sauce instead of peanuts. Theo's chicken murtabak also received positive reviews from the judges. Jamie, despite not having fish sauce, decided to cook khao soi. While the chicken was cooked beautifully, not having the fish sauce meant the dish lacked punch. Samira's chicken kofta wrapped in eggplant had great flavours, but it was overcooked, and she was eliminated.	1,097,000/ 619,000	#10
29/08-2	Monday, 16 June 2025	Mystery Box: Goo — The mystery box challenge for sweet week contained a 'golden goo': the contestants had 75 minutes to create a gooey dish. The top four dishes were Callum's chocolate and macadamia cremeux with parsnip, wattleseed & saltbush, Laura's amaretto affogato, Andre's amaro caramel gnocchi and almond ice cream, and Beau's tiramisu with salted caramel, dark chocolate and hazelnuts. Declan was also praised for creating a croquembouche with marshmallow & caramel in 75 minutes. Andre, Beau, Callum and Laura advanced to the first immunity challenge of the week.	1,240,000/ 676,000	#12
30/08-3	Tuesday, 17 June 2025	Immunity Pressure Test: Poh's Big Bake Off — Andre, Beau, Callum and Laura had 3.75 hours to re-create three of Poh's bakes from her business Jamface: mille-feuille, rhubarb lily tart, and strawberry and lychee chiffon cake. Callum's efforts had the most criticism from the judges as his cake didn't rise as well as Poh's, and the layers are uneven. His rhubarb was overcooked, the tart shell was fudgy and the rough puff was very brittle. Andre's cake presentation was criticized but the flavours and layering were praised; like Callum his rhubarb was overcooked. Beau and Laura's results wowed the judges, with Laura's being perfect and winning her immunity from Sunday's elimination.	1,077,000/ 604,000	#11
31/08-4	Wednesday, 18 June 2025	Jelly Gems Taste Test Immunity Challenge — The contestants apart from Laura took part in a two-round immunity cook. In round 1 they took turns tasting different jellies to identify the flavour, the five remaining moved to round 2. Audra, Callum, Declan, Sarah and Theo had 90 minutes to create a dessert using the ingredients used in the jelly taste test. Declan was ambitious with his almond & mango frangipane tart but his custard didn't set in time. Though Audra, Sarah and Theo received praise for their dishes, Callum's take on 'gin and tonic' was declared the winner and joined Laura with immunity from the next elimination.	1,043,000/ 529,000	#12
Week 9 (Aussie Icons Week)
32/09-1	Sunday, 22 June 2025	Sweet Nostalgia Elimination Challenge — The contestants apart from Laura and Callum had 75 minutes to cook a dessert inspired by their childhood memories. Sarah's cereal, Snezana's honey cake and Depinder's tropical lamington were announced as the top 3 dishes by the judges. Theo had issues with the baking of his baklava and had to deep fry them, making the texture feel like a cannoli instead. But Beau's decision to make a spider-inspired dessert with elements of a sundae lost the nostalgia element and didn't hit the brief, resulting in him being eliminated.	1,212,000/ 650,000	#9
33/09-2	Monday, 23 June 2025	Nornie Bero Mystery Box — The mystery box challenge was set by guest chef Nornie Bero. It contained ingredients that are native to Australia, with which the contestants had 75 minutes to cook a dish from. Callum's emu carpaccio with yam crisps, Laura's yabbies & yams and Snezana's yam knedle with ooray plums, strawberry gum ice cream & sunrise lime syrup were the top three dishes. Declan's mackerel with ooray plum emulsion, crispy yams & saltbush damper and Audra's kueh pie tee, emu tartare & sunrise lime sambal also receive praise. Theo's native ice cream sandwich didn't have enough ooray plum reduction and his biscuit's were too thick. For Sarah's native Australian pearl with cured mackerel & confit yabb, while the mackerel was cured nicely the native flavours were too restrained. Ben's golden syrup parfait and pepper berry ice cream had whole pepper berries resulting in being over powering and Jamie's saltbush and pepperberry crusted emu needed a sauce to tie the dish together. Having cooked the bottom 4 dishes, Ben, Jamie, Sarah and Theo were send to Tuesday's elimination challenge.	1,318,000/ 683,000	#10
34/09-3	Tuesday, 24 June 2025	Cook with Curtis Elimination Challenge — The elimination challenge required Ben, Jamie, Sarah and Theo to cook alongside Curtis Stone as he prepared herb ricotta raviolo with braised lamb shank. Sarah's calm approach helped her not only keep up with Curtis but also overtake him several times. Ben's experience in his previous cook helped him to keep up with Curtis as well. Jamie struggled with his ricotta mixture not curdling and had to re-do the step, while he managed to catch up he didn't have time to taste the ricotta filling. Theo had the most difficulty and struggled to catch up with Curtis. Though his ricotta filling failed twice he managed to salvage it but put his raviolo in the boiling water last. Sarah and Ben had no criticism for their efforts, Jamie's ricotta filling was criticized for being bland, but Theo's undercooked pasta was his undoing, and he was eliminated.	1,231,000/ 654,000	#10
35/09-4	Wednesday, 25 June 2025	Ice Cream Immunity Challenge — Curtis returned for the immunity challenge. The contestants were asked to cook a dessert in 90 minutes with an ice cream inspired by winter. In addition to immunity, the winner would also have their ice cream sold at Coles supermarkets. Ben, Depinder and Jamie received praise from the judges, but Laura won with her sticky date pudding with butterscotch sauce ice cream, granting her immunity and making her the first contestant to reach the Top 10.	1,142,000/ 631,000	#12
Week 10
36/10-1	Sunday, 29 June 2025	Maggie Beer Time versus Ingredients Elimination Challenge — The contestants apart from Laura had up to 90 minutes with twelve sets of ingredients set by guest judge Maggie Beer, with one set available every five minutes. Alana, Audra and Snezana start off with 80 minutes, Alana made a lemon ginger biscuit tart with vincotto ice cream, grapes and blackberry, Audra made ricotta and caramelised fig tarts and Snezana made an egg raviolo with confit egg and onion sauce. Callum made a beetroot and verjuice granita and a verjuice parfait in 75 minutes. Sarah made a sweetbread tart with caramelised onion, pickled grapes and parsnip crisps in 65 minutes. Andre, Declan and Jamie followed with 60 minutes: Andre cooked chicken with a ginger veloute, ox tongue and zucchini, Declan made offal skewers with vincotto glaze and radicchio coleslaw, and Jamie made charred and roasted chicken. Depinder made chicken curry with roti in 45 minutes. Ben was the last to start cooking and cooked panfried ocean trout with shellfish and parsnip puree in 40 minutes. Alana, Callum, Depinder and Sarah's dishes received the highest praise from the judges. Ben was praised for the cooking of the fish, but the rest of the dish felt heavy and lacked freshness. Declan's dish was criticized for not having a sauce to complete the dish and the slaw was basic. While the judges felt that both Declan's and Ben's dishes had flaws, they felt that Ben's completed dish was enough to save him and Declan was eliminated, finalizing the top 10.	1,031,000/ 629,000	#10
37/10-2	Monday, 30 June 2025	Air Fryer Mystery Box — The top 10 faced a mystery box containing an air fryer with which the contestants had to cook a dish; ovens were not allowed. Audra's twice-cooked pork belly and plum sauce and Callum's honey and thyme filo with ginger and honey jelly and salted eucalyptus ice cream received praise from the judges. But Sarah's carrot medallion with carrot puree and carrot gel won dish of the day and a $5000 Harvey Norman voucher. For Andre's smoked red mullet, with potato croquette, poached eggs and olive oil hollandaise, his croquettes lacked seasoning. Snezana cooked steak with beetroot bread, beetroot jus, roasted beetroot and beetroot crisps, which the judges loved for presentation but her sauce was not reduced enough. For Alana's roasted lamb rump with honey and carob lamb jus, the jus was praised, but the lamb was overcooked. Having cooked the bottom three dishes, Alana, Andre and Snezana were sent to the pressure test.	1,340,000/ 665,000	#9
38/10-3	Tuesday, 1 July 2025	Philip Khoury 'Dawn of a Tropical New Day' Pressure Test — Alana, Andre and Snezana had 2 1/4 hours to re-create guest chef Philip Khoury's plant-based dessert 'Dawn of a Tropical New Day'. All three contestants struggled with the concept that plant based ingredients behave differently to recipes with dairy and eggs. Snezana had no issues throughout the cook until she had to remake her white chocolate shards three times. Despite that, her effort was the closest to the original. Alana forgot to measure the coconut sponge mixture before putting it in the oven. As a result, the sponge was thick, but she fixed it by cutting the sponge in half. She also made the mistake of dipping the whole base in the coconut chocolate mixture, resulting it being difficult to cut open and her chantilly cream was loose, but the judges loved the flavours. Andre made a strong start but fell apart in the last 15 minutes. His coconut sponge was also too thick and because of that, he compressed it to make fit in the mold. He also rushed the dipping process, and the chocolate shell was too thick to cut open smoothly. Andre's flavours were also unbalanced, resulting in him being eliminated.	1,214,000/ 663,000	#11
39/10-4	Wednesday, 2 July 2025	Barbecue Battle Two-Round Immunity Challenge — The top 9 arrived at the MasterChef garden to compete in a two-round immunity challenge. In round one, they were divided into teams of three and each team had to choose someone to cook on a barbecue and create a dish in 45 minutes. Gray team (Alana, Callum and Jamie) chose Jamie, purple team (Audra, Depinder and Laura) chose Laura, and green team (Ben, Sarah and Snezana) chose Sarah. All three dishes were praised, but the judges felt that Jamie's okonomiyaki highlighted the barbecue cooking technique more and won his team the round. In round 2, Alana, Callum and Jamie had 75 minutes to create a dish inspired by classic dishes named after historical figures. Alana had peach Melba, Callum had pavlova and Jamie had beef Wellington. Both Alana and Jamie's dishes received praise, but Callum's fig and strawberry pavlova received the highest compliments, winning him immunity from Sunday's elimination.	1,073,000/ 608,000	#10
Week 11 (Qatar Week)
40/11-1	Sunday, 6 July 2025	International Cuisine Elimination Challenge — The contestants, apart from Callum, had up to 75 minutes to create a dish inspired by a country to which Qatar Airways flies. Alana chose Lebanon, Audra and Jamie chose Spain, Ben chose Greece, Depinder and Sarah chose France, Laura chose Italy and Snezana chose Turkey. Sarah's chilled bouillabaisse salad, Laura's maccaruna with rabbit ragu and wild fennel, Jamie's arroz caldoso with prawns, pipis and squid, and Ben's kataifi prawns, skordalia and tzatziki were the top four dishes of the day. Both Snezana and Audra failed to impress the judges of the connection between their chosen countries and the dish. Snezana's baked apple with coffee syrup and lemon verbena-flavoured ice cream was praised but the texture of her poached apple was off. Audra's rice and seafood were inconsistent, and because they were the foundations of the paella, the judges felt that Audra had missed the brief, and she was eliminated. It was announced that the top 8 are flying to Doha. Ben, Jamie, Laura and Sarah, for producing the top four dishes, are flying business class.	993,000/ 576,000	#11
41/11-2	Monday, 7 July 2025	Qatar Mystery Box Challenge — The top 8 arrived at Doha and their mystery box contained local ingredients, at least one of which the contestants had to include in a dish in 75 minutes. Sarah's lamb consommé with date rough puff and Snezana's mezze platter received praise, but it was Callum's poached hamour with black lime sauce, achar, zucchini kefir laban salad and flatbread and Jamie's spiced hamour crudo with loomi, saffron and date broth, cured Lebanese zucchini, kirsck emulsion, pickled plum, turmeric and parsley oil, and pistachio that were the top 2 dishes of the day, winning them immunity from Sunday's elimination.	1,120,000/ 626,000	#15
42/11-3	Tuesday, 8 July 2025	IDAM Six-course Degustation Immunity Challenge — The contestants arrive at the Museum of Islamic Art and, apart from Callum and Jamie, they have to cook a six-course degustation menu at a restaurant. First they explored Doha for inspiration for their courses; they had 90 minutes each to prepare their cours. Snezana was inspired by the fish market, her dish of crudo with squid noodles, cucumber and mint consommé, blinq blossom, lemon gel and saffron oil received praise from the judges as the perfect dish to start a degustation menu. Alana was inspired by the amphitheatre; her dish was smoked eel with muhammara jam, pickled jujube, chicken skin and bay leaf. The judges said that the presentation was good but the mahammara flavour over-powered the smoked eel, leaving the flavours unbalanced. Ben was inspired by the cultural village sails; his dish of charred octopus with curried potato, camel lardo and red pepper jus received universal praise from the judges who felt that the dish was perfect for the restaurant. Depinder was inspired by the spice market, to cook her take on a biriyani. While flavorsome, the judges felt that dish didn't belong on a degustation menu. Sarah inspired by the desert rose; she struggled to deliver her take on a chocolate cheese board and the judges felt the flavours were unbalanced. Laura was inspired by the Golden Mosque for which she made a conceptual dessert. Her dessert of karak tea gelato with pistachio financier, whipped pistachio cream, and blood orange compote with golden honey tuiles meant to replicate the mosque tiles. The judges praised her for her dish's flavour and fitting for the restaurant. The judges announced that Ben and Laura were the top 2, with Ben winning immunity for Sunday's elimination.	1,219,000/ 636,000	#8
43/11-4	Wednesday, 9 July 2025	Qatar Airways Business Class Immunity Challenge — The remaining contestants arrived at Hamad International Airport to create a dish suitable for the business class menu in 75 minutes. Laura's ricotta and mushroom tortellini and Alana's bugs received positive reviews from the judges. But it was Depinder's prawn sukka with banana bread, tempered rice and mango pachadi that received the highest compliments, winning her immunity from Sunday's elimination as well as a business class ticket home.	981,000/ 513,000	#11
Week 12
44/12-1	Sunday, 13 July 2025	Duel Elimination Challenge — The contestants arrived back from Doha and Alana, Laura, Sarah and Snezana had to compete in duels for the two-round elimination cook. In round 1, Alana and Sarah had to cook a dish that featured horseradish, and Laura and Snezana had to cook a dish that featured hazelnuts. Laura tried to feature hazelnut with gelato, but it split, forcing her to make a whipped salted hazelnut mascarpone. As a result, her dish of hazelnut sponge with dark chocolate mousse and quandong didn't have enough hazelnut flavour, while Snezana's hazelnut-crusted fish with hazelnut beurre blanc, celeriac emulsion, mushrooms and carrots won the battle. Alana's dish of horseradish ice cream with goat's cheese curd wowed Jean-Christophe but the rest of the judges felt that the dessert lacked sweetness. Sarah's savoury donuts filled with horseradish cream and topped with wagyu beef won the battle. In round 2, Alana and Laura had 75 minutes to create a dish that featured fennel seeds, Laura's squid noodles with charred fennel dashi won praise while Alana's burned fennel seed pavlova with sour cherry sorbet looked beautiful but had too many flavours that overpowered the fennel seeds, resulting in Alana being eliminated.	1,025,000/ 573,000	#10
45/12-2	Monday, 14 July 2025	Garlic Mystery Box — The top 7 faced a mystery box that contained garlic and a mystery ingredient that would be revealed 30 minutes into the cook. The contestants had 75 minutes to create a dish and it was revealed at the 30 minute mark that the contestants had to use a green herb assigned to them (Ben-mint, Callum-thyme, Depinder-lemongrass, Jamie-coriander, Laura-chives, Sarah-dill & Snezana-rosemary). Callum's garlic and thyme-stuffed chicken with kohlrabi and pine mushroom dumplings and garlic velouté, Jamie's flathead with leek, mussels and nduja and Snezana's confit squid with rosemary garlic flatbread were the top 3 dishes. Callum, Jamie and Snezana have a chance to win immunity in tomorrow's pressure test.	1,208,000/ 684,000	#12
46/12-3	Tuesday, 15 July 2025	Immunity Pressure Test: Michael Wilson's Marguerite Opera — Callum, Jamie and Snezana had 3.25 hours to re-create Michael Wilson's marguerite opera, a layered dessert consisting of Jerusalem artichoke gelato, chocolate sponge, tempered chocolate disk, tuilles (cocoa and plain), hazelnut parfait, coffee cremeux and cacao nib nougatine. They had to serve one plate per judge. Callum cut his artichoke too thin and burnt it in the oven which led to him being behind. Both he and Snezana struggled with the tempered chocolate which led to them leaving it off the plate. Callum's nougatine was also too thick as his cooled down longer than the other two. Jamie struggled to scoop perfect gelato roses. As Snezana received praise with her flavours. Callum compensated for the lack of chocolate disk with another tuille, but his flavours were out of balance. Jamie's efforts were the closest to Michael's, winning him immunity for Sunday's elimination.	1,180,000/ 674,000	#10
47/12-4	Wednesday, 16 July 2025	Lucky Dip Immunity Challenge — The contestants apart from Jamie had to choose a cloche in front of a letter from the alphabet. Ben chose V for Vegemite, Callum chose Q for quince, Depinder chose C for coffee, Laura chose A for anchovies, Sarah chose P for pandan leaves and Snezana chose M for miso. The contestants had 75 minutes to cook a dish that featured the ingredient from the letter they chose. The judges were torn between Depinder's coffee baked Alaska and Laura's hand-cut tagliernin with anchovy dashi and yuzu kosho. Ultimately the judges decided that Laura received immunity from Sunday's elimination.	1,023,000/ 642,000	#10
Week 13
48/13-1	Sunday, 20 July 2025	90-Minute Two-Round Elimination Challenge — The contestants apart from Jamie and Laura faced a two-round elimination challenge where they were given 90 minutes to split between the two rounds however they chose. Callum's dish of moules frites impressed the judges while Depinder took nearly an hour to make her dish of aloo tikki chole chaat which impressed the judges with its depth of flavour; both cooks are declared safe. Ben, Sarah and Snezana were sent into the second round, where they had to cook another dish using whatever time they had left. Ben having 66 minutes had the advantage of time to develop flavour with his dish of scallop cappellacci with braised fennel, squid Ink emulsion, prawn bisque sauce and fennel salad, for which the judges gave rave reviews. Despite having only 49 minutes Sarah took a gamble to make shortcrust pastry for her conceptual dish of scallop pie and the judges loved the dish. Snezana with only 41 minutes was rattled by her poor time management in the first round and made a dish of mushroom ragu with polenta and porcini cream. The judges criticized the mushroom for being too dry which resulted in Snezana being eliminated.	1,124,000/ 638,000	#8
49/13-2	Monday, 21 July 2025	Andy Allen's Everything Mystery Box — The top 6 faced a mystery box created by Andy that contained Moreton Bay bug, bone marrow, Greek-style yoghurt, purple daikon, honey butternut squash, spent cumquat jam, seaweed tapenade and shiso leaves. The contestants had to use every ingredient in the mystery box and cook a dish in 75 minutes. The judges announced that the top 4 dishes will cook in tomorrow's immunity challenge for a spot in the Top 5. Ben's butter poached bay lobster, braised daikon and daikon leaf and chutney with pumpkin and jam, Callum's purple daikon dumplings with bay lobster stuffing and shiso sopressini, Depinder's lobster dumplings, pickled daikon and honeynut squash with yoghurt seaweed tapenade vinaigrette dressing and Laura's glazed bay lobster with torched squash and green emulsion were the top 4 dishes of the day. As a result, Ben, Callum, Depinder and Laura will cook in tomorrow's service challenge for immunity.	1,214,000/ 710,000	#12
50/13-3	Tuesday, 22 July 2025	Vue De Monde Service Immunity Challenge — Ben, Callum, Depinder and Laura arrived at Vue de Monde restaurant where they met head chef Hugh Allen for a degustation service challenge. Each contestant had 2.5 hours and to create a dish that featured an ingredient used at the restaurant. Callum had wasabi leaves, Ben had kelp, Laura had golden beetroots and Depinder had green ants. Callum's wasabi leaf pasta with shio koji received praise from the judges for his use of the wasabi leaves. Ben's butter-poached marron was cooked perfectly, but his kelp broth was criticized for lacking flavour. Laura's wagyu sirloin and golden beets received positive comments from the judges. Depinder's coriander ice cream and green ant meringue wowed the judges for her use of the green ants. Despite strong competition from Laura and Depinder, Callum won the challenge and immunity from Sunday's elimination.	1,177,000/ 689,000	#8
51/13-4	Wednesday, 23 July 2025	Family-inspired Immunity Challenge — The contestants apart from Callum received letters from their loved ones which were inspiration for their challenge: to create a dish in 75 minutes inspired by their family. Sarah's dish of "sausages and bread", a shichimi togarashi-spiced boudin blanc with taro glaze and a milk bun, and Depinder's sadya, an Indian feast served on a banana leaf, received praise from the judges. But it was Laura's "native Australian summer" dessert consisting of paperbark ice cream, wattle seed puff pastry, cinnamon myrtle creme patissiere, muntries and apple caramel garnished with green ants that received the highest compliments from the judges, winning her immunity from Sunday's elimination.	1,023,000/ 624,000	#12
Week 14
52/14-1	Sunday, 27 July 2025	Winner's Pantry Elimination Challenge — The contestants apart from Callum and Laura were set an elimination challenge by previous winners Julie Goodwin and Nat Thaipun, who each chose a pantry of ingredients they used in their final dish at their finale. In the two-round elimination, the contestants had to choose which pantry to cook with in 60 minutes. The cooks with the worst two dishes in round 1 had to use the other pantry in round 2. Depinder chose Nat's pantry and made Thai curry ice cream with roti, chilli caramel and lemon and ginger crumb with which the judges found no fault. Ben and Jamie also chose Nat's pantry and made almost an exact dish. Ben's pork tortellini with aromatic Thai broth received praise for his broth and pasta work. While Jamie's pork dumplings with aromatic broth, caviar and finger lime received positive comments for the dumpling work and aromats, his broth was criticized for being too acidic. Sarah chose Julie's pantry to make confit-glazed wingettes with potato fondant and leek soubise, she was commended for being able to confit chicken in 60 minutes but her soubise wasn't cooked out enough and had not emulsified. In round 2 Jamie attempted to make gnocchi but rushed through the process making the gnocchi too floury, leading him to make a celeriac puree. Sarah decide to be ambitious and do pork assiette, also known as pork three ways (braised belly, crispy skin, and ham). While the balance of her sauce with the ham work well, the ham lacked flavour and her pork belly was undercooked. Jamie's dish of charred chicken with pan roasted leek and celeriac puree had praise from the judges, which meant that Sarah was eliminated.	1,026,000/ 612,000	#9
53/14-2	Monday, 28 July 2025	Favourite Ingredients Mystery Box — The top 5 faced a mystery box with ingredients they chose at the start of the competition, for which they have 75 minutes to cook a dish using those ingredients. The winner will have the final immunity for the season. Laura's King George whiting with salt-baked turnips received praise from the judges, but it was Depinder's curry leaf ice cream with solkadhi granita and white pepper meringue that was dish of the day, winning her immunity from tomorrow's elimination challenge.	1,166,000/ 685,000	#12
54/14-3	Tuesday, 29 July 2025	Vaughan Mabee Elimination Challenge —	1,112,000/ 629,000	#13
Week 15 (Finals Week)
55/15-1	Sunday, 3 August 2025	Four Contestants, Four Judges, Four Cloches —	979,000/ 585,000	#11
56/15-2	Monday, 4 August 2025	Elimination Challenge: Two-Round Elimination —	1,119,000/ 637,000	#11
57/15-3	Tuesday, 5 August 2025	Final Three: Time Auction —	1,058,000/ 625,000	#12
Week 16 (Grand Finale Week)
58/16-1	Sunday, 10 August 2025	The Fun One —	994,000/ 553,000	#10
59/16-2	Monday, 11 August 2025	Semi-Final: Service Challenge —	1,353,000/ 712,000	#8
60/16-3	Tuesday, 12 August 2025	Grand Finale —	1,392,000/ 784,000	#7

== Awards and nominations ==
Year	Award	Category	Recipients and nominees	Result	Refs.
2025	65th Logie Awards	Best Competition Reality Program	Masterchef Australia	Nominated	
2025	65th Logie Awards	Most Popular Personality on Australian Television	Poh Ling Yeow	Nominated	
2025	65th Logie Awards	Graham Kennedy Award for Most Popular New Talent	Sofia Levin	Nominated	

== See also ==
- MasterChef: Back to Win
