= Nat Thaipun =

Australian cook and reality TV contestant

- Born: Nathale Thaipun
- Other name: Nat Wolf
- Occupations: Chef; barista; author
- Years active: 2024–present
- Known for: Winning MasterChef Australia
- Predecessor: Brent Draper
- Successor: Laura Sharrad
- Website: www.natwolf.co

Nathale Thaipun is an Australian television chef and barista. She was the winner of MasterChef Australia series 16 in 2024.

== Early life ==
Thaipun boarded at Geelong Grammar School, where she was the Athletics Captain. Her parents, Han and Nutsiree, were restaurateurs, so she was exposed to the world of cooking from an early age. When her parents were running the restaurant, she and her two brothers learned to cook for themselves.

== Career ==
Thaipun held a variety of positions since leaving school, including barista, business manager, restaurant owner, and Greenpeace fundraiser.

In 2019, while living in Wānaka, New Zealand, Thaipun and her business partner developed "Wanakup", a reusable coffee cup which was provided through cafes on a "borrow, buy, return" system. The cup, which replaced over 450,000 single-use cups in two years, won a Local Initiative Award.

Thaipun has gained restaurant work experience with Jamie Oliver, Claire Smyth and Vue de Monde.

In January 2025, she announced her first cookbook, Thai: Anywhere and Everywhere, which is set to be released in October 2025.

== MasterChef ==
Thaipun entered the 16th series of Masterchef Australia in 2024. In the first week of competition, she earned the series' only "immunity pin" (to avoid a subsequent elimination) and one week's work experience with Jamie Oliver in London. During the program's visit to Hong Kong, she received a job offer from chef Vicky Cheng.

On 16 July, Thaipun won the grand finale, defeating Tasmanian butcher Josh Perry by 71 points to 68. She received prize money of $250,000 and a residency at Alumni Restaurant in the Crown Melbourne resort.

== Personal life ==
Thaipun participates in high energy sports including snowboarding, skateboarding, surfing and skydiving. She is known for having over 90 tattoos on her body, which connect with her Thai heritage and the places she has visited.

Preceded by Brent Draper	MasterChef Australia; Winner	Succeeded by Laura Sharrad
