= MasterChef Australia series 16 =

MasterChef Australia
- Season 16
- Judges: Andy Allen; Sofia Levin; Jean-Christophe Novelli; Poh Ling Yeow
- No. of contestants: 22
- Winner: Nat Thaipun
- Runner-up: Josh Perry
- No. of episodes: 50

Release
- Original network: Network 10
- Original release: 22 April – 16 July 2024

Series chronology
- ← Previous; Series 15 Next → Series 17

The sixteenth series of the Australian television cooking show MasterChef Australia was announced in October 2023 and premiered on 22 April 2024 on Network Ten. Series 4 winner Andy Allen returned as judge from the previous series having held the role since series 12, whilst Melissa Leong left the show to judge the second series of Dessert Masters and Jock Zonfrillo died prior to the broadcast of the previous series. Food writer Sofia Levin, French chef Jean-Christophe Novelli and series 1 runner-up Poh Ling Yeow took over as judges, replacing Leong and Zonfrillo.

The series was won by Nat Thaipun in the grand finale against Josh Perry, broadcast on 16 July 2024.

== Changes ==
Unlike previous series, the number of judges was increased from three to four and the program was broadcast only four nights per week. The number of contestants also increased from 18 in the previous series to 22, however, remained less than the typical 24 contestants. Like the previous two series, the audition stage was not broadcast. The Second Chance Challenge returns where the eliminated contestants (besides Lourdes & Stephen) compete for a spot back in the competition. In addition, the returning contestant will also be safe at Sunday's Elimination. Like the twelfth series, there was only one immunity pin up for grabs for the series at the start of the competition.

== Contestants ==
=== Top 22 ===
The Top 22 was announced on 14 April 2024.

Contestant	Age	State	Occupation	Status
Nat Thaipun	28	VIC	Barista	Winner 16 July
Josh Perry	43	TAS	Butcher	Runner-up 16 July
Savindri Perera	30	SA	Banking consultant	Third place 15 July; Returned 29 May; Eliminated 28 May
Harry Butterfield	29	QLD	Commercial property	Eliminated 9 July
Mimi Wong	25	NSW	High school teacher	Eliminated 7 July
Darrsh Clarke	31	WA	Management consultant	Eliminated 2 July
Lachlan Whittle	34	VIC	Landscape gardener	Eliminated 30 June
Sumeet Saigal	46	NSW	Sales manager	Eliminated 19 June
Alex Crisp	27	WA	Sales representative	Eliminated 18 June
Gillian Dinh	31	NSW	Lettering artist	Eliminated 16 June
Josh Clarke	27	QLD	Coffee roaster	Eliminated 9 June
Sue Bazely	58	VIC	Customer manager	Eliminated 5 June
David Tan	30	QLD	Pharmacologist	Eliminated 2 June
Stephen Dennis	62	QLD	Tour guide	Eliminated 26 May
Snezana Calic	40	VIC	Financial services	Eliminated 21 May
Juan de la Cruz Torales Villarreal	39	NSW	Board game designer	Eliminated 19 May
Lourdes Leschen	22	VIC	Marketing coordinator	Eliminated 14 May
Lily Davies	30	NSW	Former nurse	Eliminated 12 May
Khristian Walker	26	VIC	Insurance services	Eliminated 7 May
Jonathan Hooper	29	NSW	Carpenter	Eliminated 5 May
Steph Griffen	28	QLD	Events manager	Eliminated 30 April
James Holmes	38	WA	Primary school teacher	Eliminated 28 April

Future appearances

- Savindri Perera, Darrsh Clarke and Snezana Calic appeared on Series 17 for another chance to win. Savindri was eliminated on 6 May 2025, finishing 22nd. Darrsh was eliminated on 8 June 2025, finishing 15th and Snezana was eliminated on 20 July 2025, finishing 7th. Nat Thaipun later appeared as a guest judge for an elimination challenge.
- Savindri will be a judge on the new MasterChef Sri Lanka series.

== Guest chefs ==
Week	Guest	Challenge
1 (Jamie Oliver Week)	Jamie Oliver	Series premiere
1 (Jamie Oliver Week)	Jamie Oliver	Team service challenge
2 (Jamie Oliver Week)	Jamie Oliver	Pressure test
4	Liam Downes	Pressure test
5 (Trending Week)	Luke Nguyen	Elimination challenge
5 (Trending Week)	Vincent Yeow Lim	Mystery Box challenge
5 (Trending Week)	Anna Polyviou	Pressure test
6	Mikiko Terasaki	Elimination challenge
6	Darren Purchese	Pressure test
7	Rick Stein	Elimination challenge
7	Curtis Stone	Elimination challenge
7	Curtis Stone	Immunity challenge
8 (Sweet Week)	Adriano Zumbo	Mystery box
8 (Sweet Week)	Adriano Zumbo	Immunity challenge
8 (Sweet Week)	Adriano Zumbo	Invention test
8 (Sweet Week)	Adriano Zumbo	Elimination challenge
9	Nagi Maehashi	Mystery box
9	Hugh Allen	Pressure test
10 (Hong Kong Week)	Vicky Cheng	Immunity challenge
11	Guillaume Brahimi	Pressure test
12 (Finals Week)	Josh Niland	Pressure test
12 (Grand Finale Week)	Curtis Stone	Service challenge
12 (Grand Finale Week)	Clare Smyth	Pressure test

== Elimination chart ==
No.	Week	1			2			3		4			5		6		7		8		9		10			11		Finals	Grand Finale	
No.	Mystery Box Challenge Winner	None			Darrsh; Harry; Nat			Josh C. Lachlan; Lily; Nat		David; Harry; Juan; Stephen; Sumeet			Josh P. Lachlan; Mimi		Lachlan		Harry; Josh C. Mimi; Nat; Savindri; Sumeet		Alex		Mimi		Harry; Mimi; Nat			Josh P.		Savindri	None	
No.	Immunity Challenge	Nat		Lourdes; Savindri; Snezana; Stephen; Sumeet	Josh P. Mimi; Stephen; Sue; Sumeet			Lachlan; Lourdes; Mimi		Alex; Josh C. Josh P. Snezana			Alex; Darrsh; David		None		Alex; Savindri; Sumeet		Alex; Mimi; Nat; Sumeet		None		Darrsh; Mimi; Nat			Josh P. Nat		Josh P. Savindri	None	
No.	Elimination Challenge Winner	David; Harry; Juan; Nat; Snezana			Savindri; Snezana			None		Darrsh; Gillian; Savindri; Sumeet			Savindri		Alex; Harry; Lachlan		Darrsh		None		Harry		None			Savindri		None	None	
1	Nat	WIN	I.P	Top 5	Top 3	Team Lose 3	Btm 5	Top 4	Btm 17	Btm 4	Team Lose 2	Btm 5	IN	Btm 12	Top 4	Btm 4/Imm.	Team Win	Btm 9	Team Win	IMM	IN	Btm 5	WIN	Team Win	IMM	IN	IMM	Btm 2	Top 2	WINNER
2	Josh P.	IN		Btm 3	Top 4	Team Win	IMM	IN	Btm 17	IN	Team Win	IMM	Top 3	Btm 12	Btm 2	Btm 9	DNP	Btm 3	Team Lose 1	Btm 2	Btm 3	Top 2	IN	Team Lose 1	Btm 4	WIN	Btm 2	Btm 3	Top 2	Runner-up
3	Savindri	Top 2		IMM	IN	Team Lose 1	Top 2	IN	Btm 17	IN	Team Lose 3	Top 4	IN	WIN	Elim	IMM	Team Win	Btm 9	Team Lose 1	Btm 6	Btm 2	Btm 5	DNP		Btm 4	Btm 2	WIN	IMM	3rd	Re-eliminated (Ep 49)
4	Harry	IN		Top 5	Top 3	Team Lose 3	Btm 2	IN	Btm 17	Top 5	Team Lose 3	Btm 5	Btm 4	Btm 12	IN	Top 3	Team Win	Btm 9	Team Lose 2	Btm 6	IN	WIN	Top 3	Team Lose 2	Btm 4	Btm 3	Btm 3	Elim	Eliminated (Ep 47)	
5	Mimi	IN		Btm 16	IN	Team Win	IMM	Btm 2	Btm 6	IN	Team Lose 1	Btm 8	Top 3	Btm 12	Top 4	Btm 2	Team Win	Btm 9	WIN	IMM	WIN	Top 3	Top 3	Team Lose 1	IMM	Top 2	Elim	Eliminated (Ep 45)		
6	Darrsh	IN		Btm 16	Top 3	Team Lose 3	Btm 5	IN	Btm 17	IN	Team Lose 1	Top 4	Btm 2	Btm 12	IN	Btm 9	Team Lose	WIN	Team Lose 2	Btm 3	IN	Btm 5	IN	Team Win	IMM	Elim	Eliminated (Ep 43)			
7	Lachlan	IN		Btm 16	IN	Team Lose 2	Btm 13	Top 4	Btm 17	IN	Team Lose 1	Btm 5	Top 3	Btm 3	WIN	Top 3	Team Lose	Btm 3	Team Lose 3	Btm 6	IN	Btm 2	IN	Team Lose 2	Elim	Eliminated (Ep 41)				
8	Sumeet	IN		Btm 3	Btm 4	Team Win	IMM	Btm 4	Btm 6	Top 5	Team Lose 3	Top 4	IN	Btm 12	Top 4	Btm 9	Team Win	IMM	Team Win	IMM	Top 2	Elim	Eliminated (Ep 36)							
9	Alex	IN		Btm 16	IN	Team Lose 2	Btm 13	IN	Btm 17	Btm 4	Team Win	IMM	IN	Btm 3	IN	Top 3	Btm 2	Btm 9	WIN	IMM	Elim	Eliminated (Ep 35)								
10	Gillian	IN		Btm 16	IN	Team Lose 2	Btm 5	IN	Btm 17	Btm 2	Team Lose 2	Top 4	IN	Btm 12	IN	Btm 9	Team Lose	Btm 9	Team Lose 3	Elim	Eliminated (Ep 33)									
11	Josh C.	IN		Btm 16	Btm 4	Team Lose 2	Btm 13	Top 4	Btm 6	IN	Team Win	IMM	IN	Btm 12	IN	Btm 9	Team Win	Elim	Eliminated (Ep 29)											
12	Sue	IN		Btm 16	IN	Team Win	IMM	IN	Btm 17	IN	Team Lose 2	Btm 8	IN	Btm 12	Btm 4	Btm 3	Elim	Eliminated (Ep 27)												
13	David	IN		Top 5	IN	Team Lose 1	Btm 13	IN	Btm 17	Top 5	Team Lose 3	Btm 8	Btm 4	IMM	Btm 4	Elim	Eliminated (Ep 25)													
14	Stephen	IN		Btm 16	DNP	Team Win	IMM	IN	Btm 6	Top 5	Team Lose 1	Btm 2	IN	Elim	Eliminated (Ep 21)															
15	Snezana	IN		Top 5	IN	Team Lose 1	Top 2	Btm 4	Btm 17	IN	Team Win	IMM	Elim	Eliminated (Ep 19)																
16	Juan	IN		Top 5	IN	Team Lose 2	Btm 13	IN	Btm 2	Top 5	Team Lose 2	Elim	Eliminated (Ep 17)																	
17	Lourdes	IN		Btm 16	IN	Team Lose 1	Btm 13	IN	IMM	Elim	Eliminated (Ep 15)																			
18	Lily	IN		Btm 16	Btm 2	Team Lose 3	Btm 13	Top 4	Elim	Eliminated (Ep 13)																				
19	Khristian	IN		Btm 16	IN	Team Lose 3	Btm 13	Elim	Eliminated (Ep 11)																					
20	Jonathan	IN		Btm 16	IN	Team Lose 1	Elim	Eliminated (Ep 9)																						
21	Steph	IN		Btm 16	Elim	Eliminated (Ep 7)																								
22	James	IN		Elim	Eliminated (Ep 5)																									
	Eliminated	None		James	Steph	Jonathan		Khristian	Lily	Lourdes	Juan		Snezana	Stephen	Savindri; 1st elimination	David	Sue	Josh C.	Gillian		Alex	Sumeet	Lachlan			Darrsh	Mimi	Harry	Savindri; Re-elimination	Josh P.
	Eliminated	None		James	Steph	Jonathan		Khristian	Lily	Lourdes	Juan		Snezana	Stephen	Savindri; 1st elimination	David	Sue	Josh C.	Gillian		Alex	Sumeet	Lachlan			Darrsh	Mimi	Harry	Savindri; Re-elimination	Nat

== Episodes and ratings ==
Ep#/Wk-Ep#	Original airdate	Episode title / event	Viewers (national reach & total)^{[a]}	Nightly ranking
Week 1
1/01-1	Monday, 22 April 2024	Series Premiere: Identity Dish — Jamie Oliver, guest judge for two weeks, tasked the contestants with creating a dish that represents them. The majority of the contestants received positive feedback with Savindri and Nat named the top 2. While Savindri's Sri Lankan breakfast (blackened coconut snapper with milk rice, snapper sauce, raw onion sambal and Sri Lankan treacle) received universal praise, it was Nat's kangaroo larb with soy cured egg yolk and toasted rice wafer that won the only immunity pin of the season and a trip to London to work for a week at Jamie's latest restaurant.	1,423,000 / 776,000	#6
2/01-2	Tuesday, 23 April 2024	Jamie Oliver's Team Service Challenge — Each team had to cook a three-course meal for 40 previous MasterChef contestants in a service mentored by Jamie. The judges revealed four compulsory ingredients: mushroom for the entree, cashews and peppers for main and grapefruit for dessert. The purple team led by Mimi served an entree of pork wontons with mushroom broth and a dessert of grapefruit-soaked date sponge with vanilla ice cream. But Mimi's passive leadership style led to a lamb backstrap main course that had tasty elements but lacked cohesion. The burgundy team led by Savindri was a success thanks to her hands-on direct leadership. Their entree of scallops with mushroom dashi sauce, main of red emperor curry and herb rice and dessert of grapefruit pavlova were all triumphs, so they won the challenge, advancing to the next challenge for an opportunity to cook for the single weekly immunity spot.	1,400,000 / 649,000	#6
3/01-3	Wednesday, 24 April 2024	Finger Food Invention Test — Sofia set the winning team a challenge to create a dish in 75 minutes that anyone can eat with their hands. Lourdes' lemon choux buns, Savindri's seeni sambol and egg bun, Snezana's krofne with strawberry jam and crème pâtissière, Stephen's pork belly with whiskey tamarind sauce and Sumeet's panipuri were deemed the best dishes and earned the five spots in the immunity challenge.	1,021,000 / 561,000	#10
4/01-4	Thursday, 25 April 2024	Time Versus Ingredients Immunity Challenge — Lourdes, Savindri, Snezana, Stephen and Sumeet were given a choice to cook with one ingredient for 90 minutes, or 20 ingredients for 45 minutes. Both Snezana and Stephen selected the 90-minute cook. Snezana chose onion and Stephen chose macadamia nuts, while the rest chose the 20-ingredient challenge. Lourdes struggled the most. While her corn salsa won praise, her pork chop was overcooked. The judges loved Stephen's macadamia nut gateau, but his rustic cake lost to Savindri's tropical squid ceviche with mango, chilli, coconut and curry leaf, which was deemed more restaurant worthy. She won immunity from the competition's first elimination.	1,106,000 / 547,000	#7
Week 2
5/02-1	Sunday, 28 April 2024	Food Dreams Elimination Challenge — In a one-round elimination challenge, the contestants besides Savindri had 75 minutes to cook a dish inspired by their food dreams. The dishes with the highest praise were David's pumpkin soup with cocoa cream, Harry's ocean parcels with green peppercorn sauce, Juan's beef empanadas, Nat's khao soi gai and Snezana's three-course bread and butter. Josh P., Sumeet and James received the most criticism from the judges and were the bottom 3. Josh's dish had good presentation and the vegetable elements were a hit, but his beef was raw. Sumeet's butter chicken curry was tasty, but she tried to do too much and as a result, the other elements suffered. James' feta and green pepper-stuffed squid was raw, the fillings along with the parsley tahini sauce overpowered the squid and the texture was criticised. Ultimately, the judges felt that James' dish had missed the mark and he was the first contestant to be eliminated this year.	1,236,000 / 674,000	#8
6/02-2	Monday, 29 April 2024	Jamie Oliver's Parents Mystery Box Challenge — The judges announced that Stephen was unwell and as a result, he must compete in the next elimination. The remaining contestants faced a mystery box challenge set by Jamie's parents. They were given 75 minutes to make a dish using one or more of the following ingredients: rainbow trout, potatoes, sultanas, radicchio, lemons, salt 'n' vinegar Hula Hoops crisps, sorrel, peeled prawns, golden syrup and Bird's custard powder. Harry's rainbow trout with chip roasted potatoes and prawn sorrel bechamel, Darrsh's sticky toffee pudding with custard and Nat's rainbow trout and prawn savoury tart received the highest praise from the judges and were the top 3 dishes. Josh P's sultana cake with golden syrup crumble (Lazy Daisy cake) and custard was also praised. However, the meringue for Josh C's lemon tart was split; Lily's lemon custard tart was not set and the pastry was not baked well; Steph's rainbow trout and prawn ravioli was overtaken by her burnt radicchio and Sumeet's rainbow trout with pomme puree had bones and her three sauces overpowered the flavour. As a result, the latter four joined Stephen in the pressure test.	1,152,000 / 687,000	#11
7/02-3	Tuesday, 30 April 2024	Cook with Jamie Elimination Challenge - The elimination challenge included the four contestants whose dishes were weakest in the previous episode, plus Stephen, who had missed that episode due to illness. The challenge was to cook alongside Jamie Oliver as he prepared a dish from his family's pub: chicken breast stuffed with duxelles, baked in puff pastry with a mustard cream sauce and served with a celeriac and potato mash and steamed vegetables. Stephen struggled to keep up with Jamie, but he repeatedly tasted from Jamie's dish to ensure correct flavours. Steph rushed and incorrectly removed the breast tenderloin, meaning her chicken breast was under-stuffed and too dry. Lily also had trouble keeping up with Jamie and her chicken was also under-stuffed and dry. Josh C. and Sumeet followed well and prepared good matches to Jamie's dish. In the end, Steph's dish was deemed the worst match to Jamie's. Because the chicken was the foundation of Jamie's dish, the judges felt that Steph had missed the brief and she was eliminated.	1,191,000 / 655,000	#9
8/02-4	Wednesday, 1 May 2024	Queen Victoria Market Street Food Immunity Team Challenge - The 20 contestants were taken to the Queen Victoria Market for a team challenge, where they were split into four teams. The blue team (Darrsh, Harry, Lily, Nat and captain Khristian), the red team (Mimi, Stephen, Sue, Sumeet and captain Josh P.), the yellow team (David, Lourdes, Savindri, Snezana and captain Jonathan) and the pink team (Alex, Josh C., Juan, Lachlan and captain Gillian) were given five hours to prepare a street food menu for 1000 people. Each team had to feature one protein dish (blue-fish, red-beef, yellow-chicken and pink-pork) and one vegetarian dish. The yellow team chose a Greek-style menu but struggled due to the team's lack of knowledge of Greek food as well as Jonathan's chaotic leadership. As a result, both of their dishes, while tasty, were too confusing and did not celebrate Greek cuisine. The pink team's sticky glazed pork belly received praise but their yakitori mushroom skewers were underwhelming and seemed like a snack rather than a dish. The blue team had an ambitious menu of seafood stew, which received unanimous praise. Though the eggplant dish was nice it needed more seasoning and sweetness. The red team's tandoori beef skewers, biryani rice with a spicy curry sauce and raita received positive comments though Andy wished they didn't hold back on the spices. But it was their vegetarian dish of spicy eggplant dip, semolina bread and raita that was hailed the best veggie dish of the day, making the red team the winners of the challenge and saving them from elimination.	1,346,000 / 651,000	#7
Week 3
9/03-1	Sunday, 5 May 2024	Inspired by Family Elimination Challenge - The three losing teams faced a two-round elimination challenge. In round one, they had 75 minutes to create a dish inspired by one of Andy's mum's dishes. Savindri's pine and swine pastry dish and Snezana's carrot and three veg dish received the highest praise. Darrsh over-reduced his sauce and the flavour was bitter and salty, Gillian's vegetable gnocchi was underwhelming, Harry's lamb cutlets were undercooked, Jonathan's dessert was very clumsy and Nat's Danish puff pastry was undercooked, sending them to round 2 where they had 75 minutes to cook another dish inspired by their own families. Darrsh's brinjal curry with yoghurt raita, Gillian's thịt kho and Nat's palo moo received high praise and were safe. Harry's nonna's ravioli was cooked well, but his pasta filling and broth lacked depth of flavour. The ragu for Jonathan's pappardelle was tasty but undercooked and because it was too thick, the meat had not caramelised properly. The judges felt that both Jonathan and Harry had flaws with their dishes, but when it came down to the pasta work, they felt that Jonathan's dish lacked refinement, and he was eliminated.	1,228,000 / 624,000	#9
10/03-2	Monday, 6 May 2024	Mystery Box Challenge with a Twist! - All of the contestants competed in a mystery box challenge that contained six visible ingredients (quail, spring onion, nectarine, nduja, parsnip and thyme) in a 75-minute cook. There were four small boxes as well, that contained an ingredient that each of the judges had chosen (Andy chose vino cotto, Jean-Christophe chose vanilla, Sofia chose fennel and Poh chose lychees). The top dishes of the day were Josh C's quail and nduja empandanas with lychee sauce, Lachlan's 'Lachie pops', Nat's quail and nectarine dumplings and Lily's spatchcocked quail with parsnip puree, nectarines and vino cotto. However, Sumeet's quail was undercooked. Khristian's sauces overpowered the dish. Snezana's dumplings were delicious, but her quail was also undercooked, and Mimi forgot to put the vino cotto element on her plate. Having cooked the bottom four dishes, Sumeet, Khristian, Snezana and Mimi were sent to the pressure test.	1,171,000 / 655,000	#10
11/03-3	Tuesday, 7 May 2024	Pressure Test: Jean-Christophe Novelli's Jack in a Box - Khristian, Mimi, Snezana and Sumeet were given three hours to recreate Jean-Christophe's intricate dessert Jack in a Box, the dish that earned him a Michelin star in 1992. Snezana started off very stressed but ended up creating a great rendition of the dessert and was lauded for her efforts, deeming her safe. Sumeet did well throughout the challenge and that showed in her finished dish and she was also safe from elimination. Mimi's chocolate mousse was grainy. While Khristian's brownie was lovely, there were too many pieces of it missing and he was eliminated.	1,247,000 / 646,000	#9
12/03-4	Wednesday, 8 May 2024	Two Round Team Immunity Challenge - There are two cooktops and three cloches per bench as the 18 contestants enter the MasterChef kitchen. When they open their cloches, they reveal an everyday ingredient and a coloured team apron. To win immunity, the groups of three select one member to cook with the ingredient. Lourdes and Lachlan select Mimi. Alex and Nat select Josh C; David and Harry select Sumeet; Lily and Gill select Sav; Josh P and Stephen select Darrsh; and Snezana and Juan select Sue. Sumeet made chilli tofu which was way too spicy and overpowered by chilli. Darrsh made a chickpea curry which had a beautiful texture and the roti was wonderful, but it was bland. Josh C's panna cotta didn't hold its shape. It was tasty but lacked minor flavourings. Sav's rasam was delicious and had wonderful flavours and textures, the judges lauding her. Sue made swede gnocchi that was criticised for being slightly flavourless but it was beautifully presented. Mimi's honey crisps with corn ice cream completely blew the judges away and they thought it was one of the best dishes of the competition. Overall, the judges agreed that Mimi had produced the best dish, which meant that she sent herself, Lourdes and Lachlan through to round two for an immunity cook-off, where they have to cook a sweet barbeque dish. Lachie made sweet barbequed roti, which was deemed 'pretty good' but lacked the proper layering. Mimi's mochi pancake flavours were good, but slightly bland. Lourdes nailed her BBQ banana buttermilk pancakes, which were deemed simple but perfect, winning her immunity from Sunday's elimination.	1,235,000 / 645,000	#9
Week 4
13/04-1	Sunday, 12 May 2024	One Inch Cube Elimination Challenge - In round one of a two-round elimination challenge, the contestants except Lourdes faced the one-inch cube challenge, having to blindly identify cubes of food by taste and smell. The first six to guess incorrectly went into the second round; Josh C., Juan, Lily, Mimi, Stephen and Sumeet were given 75 minutes to cook a dish using the ingredients that were guessed correctly in the first round. Mimi's tonkotsu oatmeal, Josh C.'s prawn & lobster bisque and Sumeet's beetroot and pumpkin soup with prawns received high praise. Stephen also impressed the judges with his beetroot ravioli. Juan's take on assado Argentino was criticised for lacking herbs. However, Lily's dish was too simple as her chicken Maryland was cooked inconsistently and her leeks were crunchy and undercooked. The judges felt that Lily's dish was the wrong choice for today's pantry limitations and she was eliminated.	1,313,000 / 709,000	#6
14/04-2	Monday, 13 May 2024	French Mystery Box Challenge - The contestants visited the Bendigo Art Gallery for a French themed mystery box (mussels, shallots, apples, Dijon mustard, peas, croissant, duck leg, prunes, bouquet garni and apple cider) as well as under-bench staples from the local area in a 75-minute cook at the Bendigo Town Hall. Most of the contestants did well embracing the French theme. The dishes with the highest praise were Sumeet's choux au craquelin with thyme crème patisserie and apple in salted caramel sauce, David's rosemary and prune ice cream with caramelised croissant, Harry's mussel pie, Juan's duck ravioli and Stephen's 'duck by the sea'. However, Lourdes' olive oil ice cream sandwiches with salted caramel and croissant crisps were not set. Gillian spent too much time making her butter, did not remove the beards from her mussels properly and her flat bread was hard. Nat's croissant vol au vents were nice but not really better than regular vol au vent and Alex's mussel fettuccine pasta with cider cream sauce was undercooked. Having cooked the bottom four dishes, Alex, Gillian, Lourdes and Nat were sent to the pressure test.	1,391,000 / 710,000	#10
15/04-3	Tuesday, 14 May 2024	Pressure Test: Liam Downes' Smoked Egg Yolk Raviolo, with Truffle & Asparagus - Alex, Gillian, Lourdes and Nat travelled to Black Cat Truffles Farm in Wattle Flat. They were given four hours to re-create chef Liam Downes' smoked egg yolk raviolo with truffle and asparagus. Alex injured herself twice while making her pasta dough, forcing her to restart the process, but after the prep talk by Andy, she recovered and produced a near-perfect dish. Nat performed well throughout the challenge and while she forgot the crispy chicken skin, the rest of her dish more than made up for it and she was also safe from elimination. Lourdes' pasta work was brilliant, but her sauce was so over-reduced that it turned into jelly. The texture of it was firm and grainy which completely threw out the balance of the dish. Gillian had trouble with the pasta, which set her behind and as a result, some of her elements were multiple missing and that impacted the dish. Although Lourdes' and Gillian's dishes had flaws, there was one marked difference between their plates, and that was the most crucial pressure point of the dish: the raviolo. When they cut into it, the egg yolk needed to ooze. While Lourdes' dish looked pretty much like Liam's dish, her chicken skin was soggy and her egg yolk for her pasta was overcooked. Ultimately, the judges felt that Lourdes had missed the brief, and despite being a one hit wonder, she was the sixth contestant to be eliminated.	1,189,000 / 632,000	#12
16/04-4	Wednesday, 15 May 2024	Heirloom Tomato Team Relay - The 16 remaining contestants were divided into four teams and asked to cook a dish featuring heirloom tomatoes in a team relay, given 20 minutes each to cook and 30 seconds to transfer information to the next cook. Josh P., who was captain of the blue team, decided to cook red emperor fish on potato rosti with tomato and seafood sauce. Juan (green team) decided to make a simple tomato pasta dish. Darrsh (red team) opted to cook lamb shanks with polenta and Italian tomato sauce and Harry (grey team) selected a seafood curry. The red team's lamb shank was praised, but Lachlan's decision to change the sauce to a South American chili sauce and over-reduce it made the dish unbalanced; the dish was also lacking seasoning. The green team's 'herlouminous pasta' was tasty and balanced but the crumb was criticised for being too oily and the judges felt that it was more of a 45-minute dish rather than an 80-minute dish. While the grey team's seafood curry was praised for the cooking of the seafood and flavours, it was the blue team's red emperor dish that featured the heirloom tomatoes the best, making the blue team the winners of the challenge and gaining them immunity from elimination.	1,149,000 / 618,000	#11
Week 5 - Trending week
17/05-1	Sunday, 19 May 2024	Luke Nguyen Ingredient Gamble Elimination Challenge - The three losing teams faced a two-round elimination challenge set by Luke Nguyen. In round one each contestant was assigned a pair of ingredients, one visible and the other hidden underneath a cloche and 75 minutes to cook a dish with the ingredient of their choosing. Gillian's sweet and sour prawns with bisque and crispy stuffed prawn heads, Savindri's chilli crab curry with coconut sambal and Sumeet's star anise and cardamom ras malai cake cups were highly praised, while Darrsh's tropical durian trifle was considered a standout dish. Harry, Juan, Lachlan, Nat and Stephen were the bottom five; and in round two were given 75 minutes to cook another dish with the ingredient they did not select in the previous round. The judges felt that Nat redeemed herself with her miang kham, wrapped in betel leaves, while Lachlan's pan-seared kingfish with winged bean pickle and Harry's Asian-inspired seafood chowder with lemongrass were good enough to save them from elimination. The concept and flavours of Stephen's prawn-stuffed bitter melon with red curry were praised, but the bitter melon was undercooked. Juan's chicken, orange and soybean empanadas were cooked nicely but the filling was too sweet, which overtook the flavour of the salted soybeans and he was eliminated.	1,152,000 / 619,000	#8
18/05-2	Monday, 20 May 2024	Vincent Yeow Lim Wok Mystery Box Challenge - All of the contestants competed in a mystery box challenge set by guest judge, chef and social media presenter Vincent Yeow Lim, who asked them to create a dish in 75 minutes using a wok. Lachlan's sweet and sour barramundi, Mimi's turnip cake eggs benedict and Josh P.'s lobster omelette received the highest praise from the judges. However, the tofu custard for Harry's Szechuan pork hot pot did not set so he didn't serve it, and his dish was too salty and incomplete. While Snezana's cabbage wrapped trout was cooked nicely, her jasmine rice was bland, her fragrant sauce lacked seasoning and overall, her dish was underwhelming. Darrsh's chicken katsu curry was not crispy enough and David's fish and chips was too oily, and his chips were burnt. Having cooked the bottom four dishes, Darrsh, David, Harry and Snezana were sent to the pressure test.	1,227,000 / 659,000	#10
19/05-3	Tuesday, 21 May 2024	Pressure Test: Anna Polyviou's Sunny Side Up - Darrsh, David, Harry and Snezana were given three hours to re-create chef Anna Polyviou's sunny side up dessert. Harry's dish was almost identical to Anna's. David performed well and his efforts were praised. While Darrsh's flavours and textures were perfect, his performance was erratic with his workspace being messy, which caused him to fall behind and he didn't set his toast mould long enough, resulting in it looking messy on the plate. Snezana had trouble with the passion fruit curd and had to remake it, which set her behind. She managed to catch up by multi-tasking, but she over-mixed her sourdough mousse, making it heavy and affecting the flavour. Although Snezana's dish looked very similar to Anna's, it tasted very different, and she was eliminated.	1,170,000 / 614,000	#10
20/05-4	Wednesday, 22 May 2024	Microwave Hack Immunity Challenge - The 14 remaining contestants had 75 minutes to prepare a dish using one of the judges' microwave hacks of their choice (Andy's three-minute crispy chicken skin, Jean-Christophe's two-minute crispy sweet potatoes, Sofia's quick caramelised white chocolate crumb or Poh's under three-minute marshmallow meringue). Sue accidentally mixed up the onion soubise for her crispy cups of chicken skin with chicken roulade with Mimi's banana cremeux, so the dish did not work. While the judges loved the flavours of Alex's fig leaf ice cream, white chocolate and macadamia crumb with olive oil and Darrsh's roasted chicken and mushroom dessert for the combination of savoury flavours, they were amazed by David's spiced pumpkin banoffee tart and he won immunity from elimination.	1,183,000 / 597,000	#10
Week 6
21/06-1	Sunday, 26 May 2024	Egg Elimination Challenge - The episode began with a video of social media cook Mikiko Terasaki cooking omurice, to introduce the main ingredient for the 75-minute elimination challenge: eggs. Sav's steamed egg curry, a re-creation of a dish from her late mother, delighted the judges. Several contestants struggled to deliver a dish that creatively incorporated the egg. Alex's savoury custard with chive oil was overcooked, while Lachlan's Thai-style deep-fried stuffed hard boiled egg didn't deliver a good eating experience, though his curry sauce was excellent. Stephen's tempura-battered soft-boiled eggs were inconsistently cooked and the sauce was too incoherent in its seasoning and flavours. The judges decided that Stephen's flavours were the least impressive and he was eliminated from the competition.	1,137,000/ 614,000	#10
22/06-2	Monday, 27 May 2024	Asian Sauces Mystery Box Challenge - The contestants had to create a dish in 75 minutes using at least one of a selection of Lee Kum Kee Asian sauces from the mystery box. The judges liked Mimi's sesame-scallop aguachile in a seaweed tart shell, Nat's kingfish with Japanese-inspired beurre blanc and Sumeet's soy ice cream with soy-raspberry sauce, but the dish of the day was Lachlan's fried fish wings with a chili-oil mayonnaise. However, David's stir fry beans were dry, Josh P.'s stuffed chicken wings were not crispy and lacked sauce, Savindri's soy-poached pears were too salty and did not make a successful dish with the miso-soy chantilly cream and the peanut sesame brittle and Sue's spicy and sticky Asian-inspired short ribs were tasty but too dry to eat. Having cooked the bottom four dishes, David, Josh P., Savindri and Sue were sent to the pressure test.	1,357,000/ 765,000	#8
23/06-3	Tuesday, 28 May 2024	Pressure Test: Darren Purchese's Cherry Blossom - David, Josh P., Savindri and Sue were tasked with replicating Darren Purchese's cherry blossom dessert in four hours. David executed all of the elements well, while Sue was complimented for her flavours and her tempered chocolate work. Josh P. was complimented for his cheesecake, but he under-whipped his miso-caramel cream and it couldn't hold its structure. Although Savindri's dish was near-perfect in presentation, her brownie was dry, and her cheesecake mousse was unbalanced, and she was eliminated.	1,282,000/ 668,000	#7
24/06-4	Wednesday, 29 May 2024	Second Chance Cook - Eight of the ten previously eliminated contestants returned to compete for a second chance in the competition. They had 75 minutes to cook a dish using an assigned herb from the garden. All received praise including Snezana's stuffed capsicums in tomato sauce with bread and kajmak, but Savindri's Sri Lankan feast won over the judges, and she won her place back in the competition, as well as immunity from Sunday's elimination challenge.	1,116,000/ 596,000	#11
Week 7
25/07-1	Sunday, 2 June 2024	Rick Stein's Seafood Elimination Challenge - Rick Stein set the remaining contestants a two-round elimination challenge centred on seafood. They were tasked with preparing a raw seafood dish in 30 minutes. Alex's watermelon and tuna salad with crispy nori chips, Harry's kingfish and plum crudo with lemon seawater and parsley oil and Lachlan's tuna poke with roasted macadamia received the highest praise from the judges. David, Mimi, Nat and Sue were sent to round two, where they were given another 75 minutes cook a seafood main and two side dishes. Nat ran into trouble with the temperature of oil that she was going to use for deep-frying and played her immunity pin. Sue's salt-baked ocean trout feast was lauded by the judges for the cooking technique and flavours. Mimi's Cantonese seafood feast flavours were amazing but her steamed prawn dish was overcooked; David's hot smoked salmon was perfectly cooked but the flavour of the liquid smoke glaze on the salmon and his couscous and fennel salads did not impress the judges, leading to his elimination.	1,148,000/ 610,000	#8
26/07-2	Tuesday, 4 June 2024	Pub Food Service Challenge - The contestants were sent to Frankston, where the mystery box revealed that they would actually be competing in a service challenge in a nearby pub. They were divided into the green (Harry, Josh.C, Mimi, Savindri, Sumeet and captain Nat) and orange (Alex, Darrsh, Gillian, Josh.P, Sue and captain Lachlan) teams and tasked with delivering an entrée and main of elevated pub food in two-and-a-half hours. Both teams delivered with their entrées and cooked their main proteins (Wagyu steak for the orange team, tandoori-spiced lamb cutlets for the green team) perfectly, but the orange team's sides came up short, sending them into Wednesday's pressure test.	1,250,000/ 638,000	#8
27/07-3	Wednesday, 5 June 2024	Keeping up with Curtis Elimination Challenge - Josh P. was absent due to illness. Alex, Darrsh, Gillian, Lachlan and Sue had to keep up with Curtis Stone as he prepared his spice-rubbed pork with smoked beetroot and hasselback potatoes. Darrsh received praise for replicating the dish; Lachlan was also praised, despite injuring himself during the cook. While Gillian struggled at the start of the challenge, she managed to catch up impressing the judges. Alex's flavours and cooking were praised but she struggled with the pork and she left out the mustard dressing. However Sue's dish had too many issues and she was eliminated from the competition.	1,140,000/ 531,000	#11
28/07-4	Thursday, 6 June 2024	Sauce Immunity Challenge - Curtis returned for the immunity challenge. The contestants were asked to cook a dish in 75 minutes with a sauce inspired by two countries. In addition to immunity, the winner would also have their sauce bottled and sold at Coles supermarkets. Mimi became flustered and was the only contestant who forgot to plate her sauce. Alex and Savindri received praise from the judges, but Sumeet won with her Indian-Italian simmer sauce, granting her immunity and making her the first contestant to reach the Top 10.	1,133,000/ 519,000	#10
Week 8 (Sweet Week)
29/08-1	Sunday, 9 June 2024	Plant-Based Elimination Challenge - The remaining contestants except for Sumeet had 75 minutes to create a plant-based dish that tasted and felt like a meat dish. Some contestants succeeded, most notably Darrsh with his 'fried chicken waffles' (deep-fried oyster mushrooms with vegan waffles). Others struggled. Josh Clarke's dish looked refined, but it didn't reassemble a steak, Lachlan's mushroom didn't have the taste and textures and Josh Perry's patties for his burger were more beet than beef. The judges agreed that while the bottom 3's dishes had flaws, they felt that Josh Clarke had missed the mark more than the others and he was eliminated, finalizing the Top 10.	951,000/ 512,000	#9
30/08-2	Monday, 10 June 2024	Adriano Zumbo's Jelly Mystery Box Challenge - The judges announced that the winner of each of the three challenges this week would win immunity from the next elimination challenge. The Top 10 faced a mystery box challenge set by guest judge Adriano Zumbo. They had 90 minutes to create a dessert incorporating at least one of the seven rainbow-flavoured jellies in the box: mango, rhubarb, blueberry, lime, Davidson plum, raspberry and orange. Gillian struggled the most, as her mango jelly cheesecake didn't set enough. Darrsh's peanut butter and jelly crullers and Josh P.'s raspberry sponge cake were delicious, but Alex delighted the judges with her Danish dessert 'picnic at mormor's' (rødgrød med fløde jelly and ice-cream) and she won immunity.	1,424,000/ 716,000	#8
31/08-3	Tuesday, 11 June 2024	Croquembouche Invention Test - The contestants were given two hours to prepare their own version of a croquembouche. Some stumbled through the challenge. Darrsh forgot to add the strawberry jam to his strawberries and cream croquembouche. Nat's 'Jenga of life' croquembouche, made of a tower of éclairs, collapsed before the judges could taste it since her caramel was not set enough. While Harry's idea of katsuobushi and raspberry croquembouche shaped like a fish sounded exciting, the flavour balance was off. Josh P.'s 'Take me home to God's country' banoffee and toffee croquembouche and Savindri's tropical croquembouche received praise, but Mimi won the challenge and immunity with her 'Bouche-kin', made from choux buns filled with a miso-pumpkin crème pâtissière.	1,226,000/ 640,000	#12
32/08-4	Wednesday, 12 June 2024	Twins Challenge - The eight contestants who had not won a challenge this week formed pairs. The pairs were each given an appliance they had to use in cooking the same dessert in 90 minutes, where they could not see each other since they were on opposite sides of a wall. Savindri and Josh P. prepared chocolate-cherry tarts, but Josh's tart shell wasn't created right and the tarts didn't look very similar. Harry and Darrsh made similar-looking meringue nests filled with lime curd and whipped cream, but Harry's meringue was under-baked. Gillian and Lachlan's pandan Swiss roll was very tasty and consistent, but Nat and Sumeet's sticky rice with mango and cardamom ice cream looked almost identical in appearance and flavour and were very tasty, so they won immunity from Sunday's elimination.	1,193,000/ 670,000	#9
Week 9
33/09-1	Sunday, 16 June 2024	Coffee Elimination Challenge - In round one, the remaining six contestants were asked to identify the flavours of Adriano's macarons, with the first three to guess incorrectly being sent into the second round. Darrsh, Gillian and Josh P. were then given 75 minutes to make a dessert pairing one of the macaron flavours from the first round with the flavour of coffee. Darrsh's coffee and peanut Paris–Brest was declared the best dessert and Jean-Christophe said it was one of the best he'd ever tasted outside of France. Josh P.'s "smoko" dessert, a coffee custard with Malibu cream, coconut crumble and chunks of chocolate cake, received praise for the flavour of the coffee and for its pairing, but the custard didn't set in its moulds, which affected the presentation. Gillian's coffee crème caramel tasted delicious, but the dish was over-baked, leading to her elimination.	1,156,000/ 649,000	#8
34/09-2	Monday, 17 June 2024	Nagi Maehashi's Mega Mystery Box - Guest judge Nagi Maehashi set the contestants a mystery box with dozens of ingredients, but they only had 30 minutes to create a meal using at least one of the ingredients in the box and the under-bench staples. Sumeet wowed the judges with her pork kofta curry, while Mimi's scissor-cut noodles with spicy pork sauce was declared dish of the day. However, some contestants struggled. Savindri's poached Murray cod was overcooked, the sauce lacked seasoning and the green beans had too much garlic for some judges. Alex's spiced chicken with crispy potatoes and peri-peri yoghurt sauce was too basic for this stage of the competition. Josh P.'s peanut chicken was too sweet and lacked depth of flavour. Having cooked the bottom three dishes, Alex, Josh P. and Savindri were sent to the pressure test.	1,419,000/ 743,000	#7
35/09-3	Tuesday, 18 June 2024	Pressure Test: Hugh Allen's Banksia Pod - Alex, Josh P. and Savindri were given three-and-a-half hours to replicate Hugh Allen's banksia pod dessert. Josh P. executed all of the elements well, in particular getting the flavours and textures the closest to Hugh's. Savindri was complimented for her flavours and cooking of the tuilles, but she lost time remaking her macadamia mousse, so her pod wasn't quite set in the mould and didn't have the perfect shape. Although Alex nailed the chocolate and caramel element, the texture of her espresso gel wasn't right due to the gelatine not dissolving. That element also lacked coffee flavour and her tuille was underbaked, so she was eliminated.	1,298,000/ 660,000	#8
36/09-4	Wednesday, 19 June 2024	Bacon and Eggs Invention Test - The contestants were told that the day's challenge was a surprise elimination. They were presented with a cloche containing a classic Australian dish and 75 minutes to reinvent that dish, which was revealed to be bacon and eggs. In addition, the winner would earn a special prize. Harry's tiny bacon and egg rolls were deemed the top dish, while Josh P.'s bacon and pecan slice and Mimi's blueberry and bacon cobbler were praised. Lachlan's stuffed pepper with bacon and egg hash was overly rich and heavy and Andy felt he had missed the mark. Sumeet's blue cheese naan was beautifully presented but inconsistently cooked, resulting in her elimination. Afterwards, the final seven learned that they would be flying from Melbourne to Hong Kong and Harry, as the winner of the invention test, was told he would be flying business class as his prize.	1,157,000/ 656,000	#10
Week 10 (Hong Kong Week)
37/10-1	Sunday, 23 June 2024	Hong Kong Mystery Box - The contestants (except for Savindri, absent from the trip for personal reasons) arrived in Hong Kong and were told there would be no elimination while they were there. The next day at Victoria Harbour they were given a mystery box with locally sourced Asian ingredients and an adaptation of the normal under-bench staples for a local context. They were tasked with making a dish using these ingredients in 75 minutes, with the top 3 winning the chance to cook for immunity. Darrsh and Lachlan struggled with cooking in the outdoor elements: Darrsh's bao did not rise and Lachlan's pork belly didn't properly crisp in the deep fryer. Josh P. cooked a sticky pork dish over noodles which pleased the judges. The three best dishes were Mimi's pineapple bun pork sliders, Nat's cheung fun and Harry's Cantonese flower crab with egg noodles. These three contestants were chosen to compete in the next day's immunity challenge.	1,220,000/ 668,000	#7
38/10-2	Monday, 24 June 2024	Vicky Cheng Immunity Challenge - Nat, Mimi and Harry arrived at the Po Lin Monastery and were tasked with re-creating chef Vicky Cheng's three ages of daikon radish from memory in 75 minutes. Harry didn't write down the measurements. As a result, his sauce was over-reduced, the radish was undercooked and the potato roulade had too many truffles. Mimi nailed the flavours and textures but her presentation was slightly inconsistent. Nat served the best re-creation, gaining her immunity from the next elimination.	1,405,000/ 684,000	#8
39/10-3	Tuesday, 25 June 2024	Dai pai dong Service Challenge - For their last cook in Hong Kong, the contestants travelled to Stanley Street, where they paired up and took over three dai pai dong stalls, each focusing on a different cooking technique, to compete for immunity. Despite already holding immunity, Nat still competed to even out the teams. The contestants were given two-and-a-half hours to serve 120 customers. Team Wok (Josh P. and Mimi) nailed the flavours of their XO sauce radish cake as well as their beef and eggplant stir-fry, but Josh P. was unfamiliar with cooking with a commercial wok, so their dishes were inconsistently cooked. Team Steam (Harry and Lachlan) nailed the cooking of their spicy steamed clams, but the noodles in that dish lacked tenderness, while their Cantonese steamed fish was delicious but inconsistently cooked. Darrsh and Nat's deep fried fishballs and school prawn fritters impressed the judges the most, so Darrsh won immunity.	1,236,000/ 658,000	#10
40/10-4	Wednesday, 26 June 2024	Lucky Dip Immunity Challenge - Savindri was reunited with the other contestants in the MasterChef kitchen, where the five contestants without immunity were asked to select two cloches and use the Hong Kong-inspired ingredients underneath to make a dish in 75 minutes. Although Josh P. impressed the judges with his use of the winter melon in a broth, his bamboo shoot needed to be chopped finer. The rest of the contestants impressed the judges. Harry's char siu pork with black cardamom, braised daikon in vinegar and Chinese vegetables with reduced sweet vinegar sauce was especially praised, as was Mimi's fish agnolotti with sour fish broth and chilli oil. In the end the judges felt that Mimi's was the dish of the day, earning her immunity.	1,018,000/ 522,000	#11
Week 11
41/11-1	Sunday, 30 June 2024	Time Auction Elimination Challenge - At the beginning of the challenge the contestants were given 120 minutes to bid for ingredients in exchange for cooking time. Savindri's steamed egg custard with charred tomato broth and Josh P's duck two ways with poached pears and berry sauce were praised, as was Harry's semolina-coated fried snapper with charred leeks and buerre blanc, which he cooked in only 25 minutes. Although Lachlan started his cook with the most time (80 minutes), the judges thought the diverse root vegetable elements in his lamb kofta dish did not come together cohesively and he was eliminated.	1,064,000/ 612,000	#10
42/11-2	Monday, 1 July 2024	Poh's Everything Mystery Box Challenge - Poh presented the contestants with a mystery box with nine ingredients, and 75 minutes to create a dish using every ingredient. The judges also announced that the winner would receive a $5,000 Harvey Norman voucher, while the bottom three would be sent to the next day's elimination. Josh P. won the voucher with his cabbage rolls filled with spatchcock, pineapple and turnip, served with a baby mandarin sauce. Mimi's okonomiyaki received praise as well. Nat's grilled spatchcock and cabbage dish was unevenly cooked, while Savindri's turnip and cabbage fritter dish had overcooked chicken and an undercooked egg. The judges also offered mixed critiques to Harry for his chicken wraps, which needed more complexity and a fatty sauce to bind the flavours together, and Darrsh, whose fried spatchcock dish was too incoherent and featured a turnip purée that was too sweet. Savindri, Harry and Darrsh were sent to the next day's pressure test.	1,389,000/ 689,000	#7
43/11-3	Tuesday, 2 July 2024	Pressure Test: Guillaume Brahimi's Royale of Peas with Duo of Crab - Savindri, Harry and Darrsh had to re-create and produce five portions of Guillaume Brahimi's royale in four hours. Harry was slow in preparing his blue swimmer crab consommé, but he picked up the pace and nailed the flavours, texture and presentation, being the closest to Guillaume's. Savindri's flavours were good but her consommé lacked clarity, and there were small technique errors throughout her dish. Darrsh had problems with his pea royale and consommé, and he left crab shell in his dish. He also plated the five portions inconsistently. The judges deemed his dish the weakest match to Guillaume's, and he was eliminated.	1,253,000/ 672,000	#9
44/11-4	Wednesday, 3 July 2024	Food Hero Immunity Challenge - The contestants were given small chests containing a photo of their "food hero", either their mother or grandmother. They were given 75 minutes to cook a dish inspired by their hero, with the winner receiving immunity (and consequently a place in the final week of the competition). Most contestants received rave reviews for their dishes, but Savindri's modern version of her mother's chicken curry needed some more development. Josh P.'s Parmesan-crusted venison backstrap with butternut pumpkin and blackberry jus received praise for technique and flavours. But Nat's roast bone marrow with jeow som, khao jee and betel leaf pomelo salad impressed the judges the most, earning her immunity and a place in the final four contestants.	1,220,000/ 700,000	#9
Week 12 (Finals Week)
45/12-1	Sunday, 7 July 2024	Extreme Ingredients Elimination Challenge - The judges presented five strongly-flavoured ingredients: Époisses, Carolina Reaper, monkfruit, umeboshi and bitter gourd. The contestants were given 75 minutes to prepare a balanced dish using at least one of these ingredients. Savindri's Carolina Reaper prawns with tomato veil and a prawn consommé was deemed the dish of the day and her best dish of the competition. Harry's gnocchi with basil-Époisses pesto also received positive critiques. Josh P. and Mimi both struggled in the cook. Josh's deconstructed steak sandwich with Époisses cream sauce and an onion puree had flaws and was judged as too basic for this stage of the competition, while Mimi's soft-shell crab don with bitter gourd kimchi wasn't properly balanced; her original plan had been to make brioche buns for sliders, which might have paired better with the kimchi. Mimi was eliminated, finalizing the Top 4.	1,185,000/ 654,000	#9
46/12-2	Monday, 8 July 2024	Golden Ticket to the Semi-Final Mystery Box Challenge - The final four were each given a mystery box with a personalized golden ticket to take them to the semi-final if they cooked the best dish. The contestants were given 90 minutes to make any dish they wanted. Harry made crayfish in a Thai choo chee curry sauce, with a sea urchin emulsion and thin slices of nashi pear. The judges complimented his choice of flavours and textures, and his confidence. Nat attempted a hung lay lamb shank curry and a coconut custard dessert baked in a pumpkin. She ran out of time for the lamb to cook in the pressure cooker. Her custard also didn't set, so she didn't serve it. The lamb was tough, though the sauce received compliments. The judges urged her to focus more tightly in the remaining cooks. Josh P. was praised for serving a perfect pair of lamb chops with cauliflower cheese croquettes, pea puree and a lamb jus. Savindri cooked lamprais, a Sri Lankan plate of multiple dishes (pickles, meatballs, rice, sambal, eggplants, plantains, and others), served in a banana leaf. The judges loved her dish, with multiple judges declaring it their favourite dish of the whole season. She received the golden ticket to the semi-finals.	1,357,000/ 746,000	#9
47/12-3	Tuesday, 9 July 2024	Pressure Test: Josh Niland's Flounder Kandinsky - Harry, Josh P. and Nat received a masterclass in butchering fish from chef Josh Niland. They were then given three hours to recreate his flounder Kandinsky: a steamed butterflied belly filled with a scallop mousseline and grilled rack with separated bones, served with grilled zucchini and five concentric rings of sauces. Josh P. and Nat butchered their fish with comparative ease, while Harry took longer and did not follow the butchery directions correctly. He was delayed in making his sauces and did not steam his flounder belly wrapped in cling film. Josh P. piped his sauces in the wrong order, altering the flavour balance of his dish, but all of his elements were successful, and his butchery was excellent. Nat undercooked her flounder belly and scallop mousseline. Harry's dish wasn't plated correctly, and included errors in the saucing. He was the last contestant eliminated before the semi-final.	1,197,000/ 689,000	#9
Week 13 (Grand Finale Week)
48/13-1	Sunday, 14 July 2024	The Fun One! Andy Allen, Jean-Christophe Novelli, Poh Ling Yeow and the Final Three - Before the semi-final, the judges and the semi-finalists had a fun day in the kitchen, with the previously eliminated contestants watching from the gantry. In the first cook, Andy, Poh and Jean-Christophe swapped with the three semi-finalists and cooked in the MasterChef kitchen. They were given a mystery box with ingredients from the boxes across the season and had to cook a dish in 60 minutes, to be judged by the semi-finalists. Poh made steamed quail dumplings with a shrimp and apple skin sauce. Jean-Christophe made a small tarte Tatin with spun sugar and a spice ice cream. Andy made barbecued quail with a radicchio and pine nut salsa. All three were successes, but the best dish was Poh's. In the second cook, the semi-finalists competed against the judges in a relay, with the contestants given 70 minutes and the judges given 60 minutes to make a dish featuring miso. Juan, Darrsh and Alex joined Sofia in judging the relay dishes. The semi-finalists made a Thai beef salad with a miso marinade, but its miso flavour was too subtle. The judges made a seared kingfish fillet with a miso beurre blanc and spring vegetables. In part because their dish more successfully featured miso, the judges won the day.	1,169,000/ 678,000	#11
49/13-2	Monday, 15 July 2024	Semi Final: Service Challenge - The semifinalists, Josh P., Nat and Savindri, each prepared a 3-course meal for 20 diners plus the judges, in 4 hours. Curtis Stone returned to mentor them in the service challenge. Josh P. made "Tassie in a menu": an entree of abalone with XO sauce, a "surf and turf" main course of rock lobster and beef tenderloin, and a vanilla-honey panna cotta with a crumb and raspberry coulis for dessert. The judges especially enjoyed the lobster, though they said that his dessert was a bit simple. Nat's menu was inspired by her Thai Australian heritage. She made a scallop crudo entree, a main course of tom yum marron, and a honey tart dessert. All three courses featured native Australian ingredients, including lemon myrtle in the entree, Warrigal greens and finger lime in the main course, and wattleseed in the dessert. Her entree and main course were very successful, but her dessert's tart pastry was too thick. Savindri cooked a "love letter to Sri Lanka": an entree of pork belly with a coconut-spice glaze, a main course of ghee-poached lobster with a spicy dhal, and a dessert of crème diplomate with mangoes under a coconut water jelly veil. She struggled with timing. The pork belly in her entree was slightly undercooked, and the judges criticised the flavour balance and textures of the main course. The judges advanced Nat and Josh P. into the grand finale, eliminating Savindri.	1,751,000/ 883,000	#4
50/13-3	Tuesday, 16 July 2024	Grand Finale - The grand finalists were Nat and Josh Perry. The judges announced that the winner of the season, in addition to the $250,000 prize, would receive a three-week residency at ALUMNI Crown Melbourne. The contestants' families were introduced, and the two-round challenge began. In the first round, the contestants each had 75 minutes to make a dish with black peppercorns. Nat made a Scotch egg with a peppery sai ua coating and nam phrik num. Josh made ribeye steak with peppercorn sauce, fondant potatoes and Brussels sprouts two ways: grilled and pureed. Nat's Scotch egg had an oozy yolk, and her strong flavours complemented each other well. Josh's steak was perfectly cooked, and the sauce was outstanding, but the Brussels sprout puree was a bit grainy. After one round, the score was 36 points for Nat and 33 points for Josh. The second round was a pressure test. The contestants were given 4 hours to replicate Clare Smyth's Core-teser, an intricate dessert reproducing the flavours of Maltesers. Nat struggled with the elements, including the aerated dark chocolate centre of the entremet, but pulled them all together. Her mousse was incorrectly prepared, with large undissolved pieces of gelatine. Josh was confident with many of the steps in the recipe, but his malt sugar puff didn't inflate properly, so he missed the most striking visual element of the dessert. The textures of his dish were a better match to Clare's, but Nat's dish had the more striking appearance. In this round, the score was 35 points for each contestant. With a final score of 71 to 68, Nat was declared the winner of the season, receiving $250,000 and the Crown residency. For finishing second, Josh received $40,000 and Savindri received $10,000 for finishing third.	1,779,000/ 985,000	#3

- ^{a} From 28 January 2024, OzTAM ratings changed. Viewership data now focus on National Reach and National Total ratings instead of the 5 metro centres and overnight shares.
