= Laura Sharrad =

Australian chef, restaurateur, and media personality

- Born: Laura Cassai; 1995 (age 30–31)
- Occupations: Chef; restaurateur
- Years active: 2014–present
- Known for: Winning MasterChef Australia
- Predecessor: Nat Thaipun
- Successor: Vinnie Gibaldi
- Spouse: Max Sharrad (m. 2018)
- Children: 1

Laura Sharrad (née Cassai, born in 1995) is an Australian chef, restaurateur and media personality. She is best known for winning MasterChef in 2025 as well as being runner-up in 2014 and 2020.

== Career ==
In 2014, Sharrad first appeared on series 6 of MasterChef Australia, where she was runner-up.

Sharrad worked as a pastry chef alongside the late Jock Zonfrillo at his three-hatted restaurant Orana for two years, before moving to Andre's Cucina & Polenta Bar, headed by Back To Win competitor, Andre Ursini, before she spent time at Hentley Farm in the Barossa Valley.

In 2019, Sharrad became co-owner of Adelaide's successful pasta bar Nido, and followed it with a second venue in 2021, Fugazzi Bar & Dining, a New York inspired Italo-American bar and dining room in the heart of Adelaide

In 2020, she appeared on series 12 of MasterChef Australia, where she was runner-up.

In 2025, she appeared on series 17 of MasterChef Australia, where she won the series.

== Personal life ==
Sharrad is married to fellow chef Max Sharrad in 2018. They have a daughter.
