= Shannon Bennett =

Australian chef and author

- Born: 23 November 1975 (age 50); Melbourne, Australia
- Occupations: Chef, author
- Partner: Madeleine West (2005–2018)
- Children: 6
- Website: www.vuedemonde.com.au

Shannon Bennett (born 23 November 1975) is an Australian chef and author. He is best known as the head chef of restaurant Vue de Monde at Melbourne's Rialto Tower. Bennett currently serves as the creative director at the restaurant and its parent company Vue Groups, having previously been the executive chef. He has made many appearances as a guest judge on the popular cooking show MasterChef Australia.

Bennett also owns and operates several other hospitality venues in Melbourne – Vue Events at Rialto, The Lui Bar, Bistro Vue, Benny Burger and Café Vue in two locations - and has written six books. He has appeared on a number of Australian food television shows and he is a brand ambassador for Miele and Audi and Nespresso.

== Biography ==
Bennett was raised in Westmeadows, Victoria. He attended Penleigh and Essendon Grammar School. Together with classmate Curtis Stone, Bennett realised a passion for cooking and he was subsequently introduced to the restaurant trade by his uncle Tom. Bennett completed his apprenticeship at the Grand Hyatt Melbourne before working overseas and then returning to Melbourne to open Vue de monde.

Bennett was in a relationship with Australian actress Madeleine West from 2005 to 2018. The couple have six children.

== Career ==
Bennett trained at the Grand Hyatt Melbourne for 3 years as an apprentice before working for John Burton Race for 2 years, Marco Pierre White for over 2 years, and Alain Ducasse at Hotel de Paris for a year. In 2003, he was awarded Gourmet Traveller Magazine's inaugural Best New Talent title. Bennett relocated the restaurant in 2005 to Melbourne's CBD.

Bennett was invited to be the first Australian member of the associations Jeunes Restaurateurs D’Europe and Le Grand Tables Du Monde. In 2007 Bennett was a guest chef at New York's Star Chefs Congress. Vue de monde was awarded Restaurant of the Year in The Age Good Food Guide, 2013 and 2014.

Bennett's current projects include the complete redevelopment of the Burnham Beeches property while the Vietnamese/French-twist food establishment, "Jardin Tan" opened in July 2014 in Melbourne's Royal Botanic Gardens.

== Controversy ==
In 2018, Bennett received considerable attention in the media over a series of unpaid bills including the alleged underpayment and overworking of his staff at the Vue-de-Monde restaurant.

Further media attention was also given as to his refusal to pay a long outstanding debt over the installation of a $10,000 crayfish tank at his restaurant, although the matter was resolved in early 2018 with details of the settlement hidden within a confidentiality agreement.

A national current affairs television program also ran a story with more examples of unpaid bills to local builders involved in the building of Bennett's multimillion-dollar South Yarra mansion in Melbourne. The story also covered concerns raised by residents regarding the current state of disrepair of the Norris building, the proposed removal of the National Trust listed Beech trees and other issues surrounding Bennett's proposed new development of the Burnham Beeches Estate in the Yarra Valley.

== Books ==
- 28 days in Provence ISBN 0522858074
- Cooking All Over the World ISBN 9781921383823
- My French Vue - Bistro cooking at Home ISBN 9780731814206
- My Vue Modern French Cookery ISBN 0731813219
- Shannon Bennett’s France ISBN 9780522862096
- Shannon Bennett’s London ISBN 9781743791745
- Shannon Bennett’s Paris ISBN 0522858139
- Shannon Bennett’s New York ISBN 9780522861808

== Accolades ==
- 2003 Australian Gourmet Traveller, Inaugural award 'Best New Talent'
- 2004 San Pellegrino Cooking Cup, Venice, Italy 2004, Overall winner & winner best dish
- 2012 Eat-Drink-Design Awards Best Bar Design Best Restaurant Design
- 2013 The Age Good Food Guide
- 2013 Bistro Vue, Top 10 French restaurants
- 2012 Australian Gourmet Traveller Restaurant Guide
- 2012 The Age Good Bar Guide -The Lui bar - winner best restaurant bar - two glasses And Bistro vue - 1 glass
- Australian interior design awards

Hospitality Design
Sustainability Advancement Award

- 2011 Wine spectator
- Gourmet traveller fine wine partners
