= Cheese pull =

Stretching of melted cheese

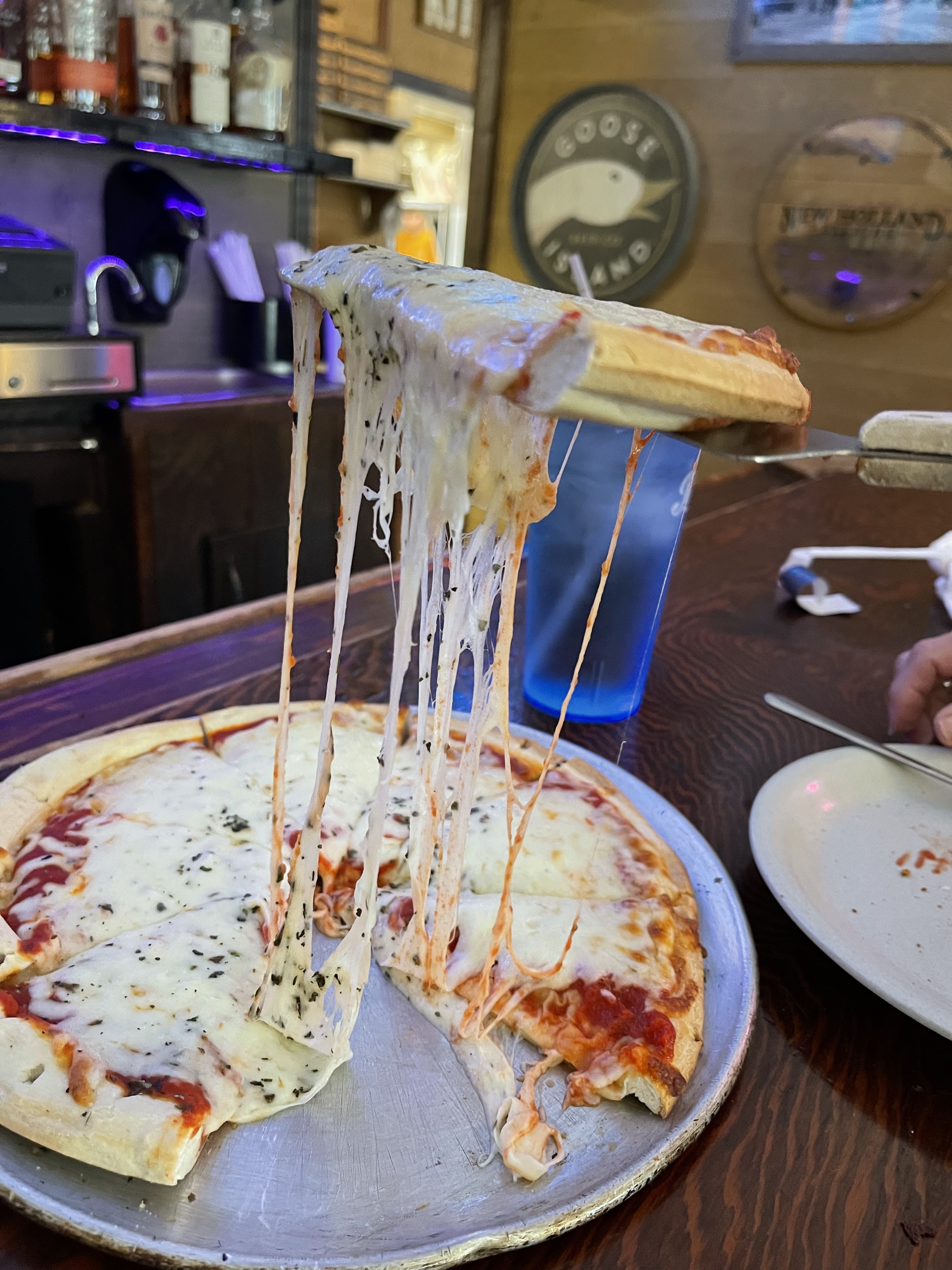
Cheese pizza at New Bethel Ordinary, Indianapolis, Indiana, 2022

Cheese pulls are the stretching of melted cheese. They are considered to appear appetizing and have been featured in food advertisements and social media.

== Background ==
A number of studies have been conducted to determine how stretchy and thick various cheese varieties are at various temperatures. Cheddar and mozzarella have been described as two of the best cheeses for cheese pulls. Various brands and restaurants have been compared by the perceived quality of their cheese pulls. The food additive sodium citrate has been suggested as a method for making melted cheese stretchier.

Various organizations have tracked world records for the longest measured cheese pull. One such record was recorded by RecordSetter in 2016, when Carlo Alberto Orecchia achieved a 41.5 inches (105 cm) cheese pull with a pizza slice. In 2023, the Doritos corporation used a helicopter to achieve a 49 feet (15 m)-cheese pull; the stunt involved a 265 pounds (120 kg) blend of cheddar and mozzarella and a 4 feet (1.2 m)-wide nacho.

== Social media ==
A 2023 article claimed that the hashtag "#cheesepull" had hundreds of thousands of uses across various social media platforms. A number of journalists have criticized the concept as unappetizing or misleading about the taste or quality of the dish.

Social media "cheese pulls" have been credited in reviving the popularity of restaurant chains such as Raising Cane's, Olive Garden, The Cheesecake Factory, and Chili's. In 2024, Chili's "Triple Dipper" appetizer, specifically the large fried mozzarella stick that's included, made up 10% of restaurant sales. The sales increased to 15% in 2025, according to NPR, and was credited fully to popularity of videos shared on social media by Chili's Chief Marketing Officer. The chain released merchandise and a Halloween costume inspired by the trend.

In 2025, Jimmy John's used the term while marketing their pizza sandwiches with the phrase, "handheld, toasted and with cheese pulls you can take on the go."
