= Vicky Cheng =

Hong Kong chef

Vicky Cheng (Chinese: 鄭永麒; born in Hong Kong; raised in Toronto) is a Hong Kong‑born, Canadian‑educated chef and restaurateur. He is the founder and executive chef of VEA Restaurant and Wing.

== Early life and education ==
Cheng was born in Hong Kong and raised in Toronto, Canada. He studied culinary arts at George Brown College.

== Career ==
Cheng began his professional training in Toronto, working under chefs Jason Bangerter at Auberge du Pommier and Anthony Walsh at Canoe. He later trained at Restaurant Daniel in New York City under chef Daniel Boulud, where he gained experience in French fine dining.

=== Return to Hong Kong and VEA ===
In 2011, Cheng relocated to Hong Kong. In 2015, he founded VEA Restaurant & Lounge. The restaurant focuses on tasting menus that incorporate French techniques and Chinese ingredients. VEA received a Michelin star in 2016 and has maintained the rating in subsequent years. It has also been listed on Asia's 50 Best Restaurants, reaching #12 in 2020.

=== Wing ===
In 2021, Cheng opened Wing. The restaurant references the eight major regional Chinese cuisines and applies both traditional and modern cooking techniques. Wing debuted at #20 on the World's 50 Best Restaurants list in 2024 and ranked #3 on Asia's 50 Best Restaurants in 2025. In the same year, Cheng received the Chefs' Choice Award.
