= Vue de Monde =

Restaurant in Melbourne, Australia

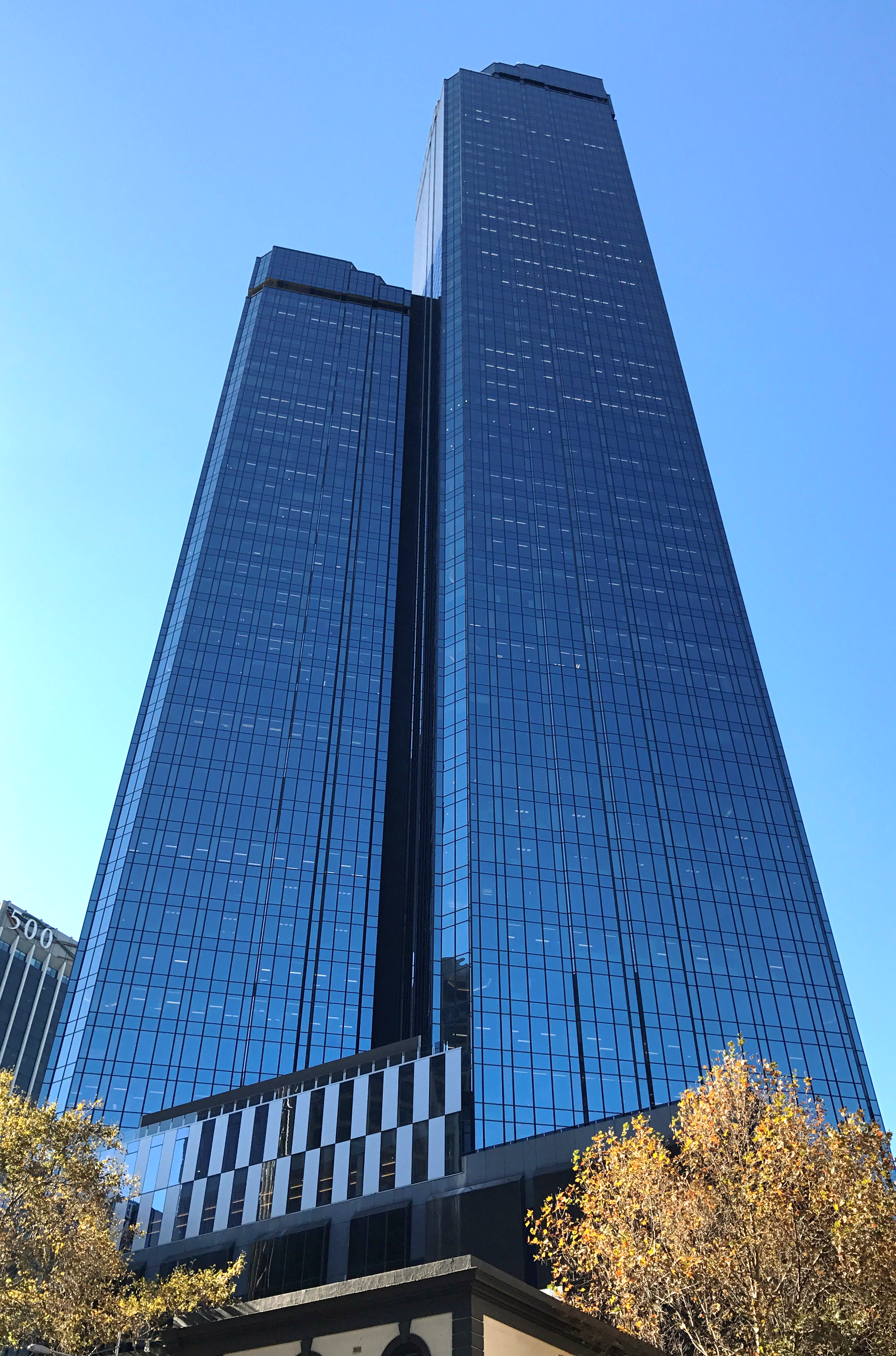
- The Rialto Towers, where Vue de Monde is located on the 55th floor
- Interactive map of Vue de Monde

Restaurant information
- Established: 2000
- Owner: Shannon Bennett
- Head chef: Hugh Allen
- Coordinates: 37°49′08″S 144°57′30″E

Vue de Monde is a French bistro restaurant in Melbourne, Australia.

== Description ==
The restaurant is located in the observation deck on the 55th floor of the Rialto Towers. The interior of the venue contains "fluffy kangaroo chairs, and table dressings of stretched black leather". It is decorated by street art from the Melbourne street artist Rone.

As of 2025, the price of the restaurant's tasting menu is $360 per person. Food served includes marron, sea snails, cheeses, and aged wagyu beef. Seafood served includes rock oysters, and Western Australian black sea snails. Penfolds Grange to match birthdays is also available.

== History ==
Prior to its move to the Rialto in 2011, the restaurant was located for six years at Normanby Chambers. Founded by Shannon Bennett in 2000, it operated as "merely a very good" French bistro in Carlton. The grammatically incorrect name, Vue de Monde (it ought to use the partitive article 'du') resulted from an error by Bennett when registering the name.

The current head chef Hugh Allen worked formerly at Noma in Copenhagen. Like Bennett before him, he has also made many appearances as a guest judge on the popular cooking show MasterChef Australia.

In 2023, the restaurant closed temporarily for renovations.

== Reception ==
Reviewer Gemima Cody of The Age rated the venue an 18/20 in her 2021 review. Dishes that received particular praise in the review included the marron in native Australian curry broth. However, she said that the Shepherd avocado in a ginger and lemon aspen broth "fell flat". Cody described the restaurant as one with considerable "star power and history" in Melbourne, with the "best ingredients that money can buy".
