= MasterChef Australia series 15 =

Australian television series season

MasterChef Australia: Secrets & Surprises
- Season 15
- Judges: Andy Allen; Melissa Leong; Jock Zonfrillo
- No. of contestants: 18
- Winner: Brent Draper
- Runner-up: Rhiannon Anderson
- No. of episodes: 50

Release
- Original network: Network 10
- Original release: 7 May – 16 July 2023

Series chronology
- ← Previous; Series 14 Next → Series 16

The fifteenth series of the Australian cooking game show MasterChef Australia premiered on 7 May 2023 on Network 10 and concluded on 16 July 2023.

The series was originally announced at Paramount's and Network 10's upfronts in October 2022. Subtitled Secrets & Surprises, the season featured 18 contestants, with 17 new to the show. Andy Allen, Melissa Leong, and Jock Zonfrillo returned to the show as judges from the previous season. The series was originally scheduled to premiere on 1 May 2023. However, following Zonfrillo's death on that day, the premiere was postponed until 7 May. Filming of the season had been completed in March 2023 and was thus unaffected by the death of Zonfrillo. The premiere was preceded by a special edition of The Sunday Project that paid tribute to Zonfrillo.

"The series was originally scheduled to premiere on 1 May 2023.[1] However, following Zonfrillo's death on that day, the premiere was postponed until 7 May."

The series was won by Brent Draper, who previously appeared in series 13 but withdrew for mental health reasons.

== Changes ==
Compared to previous seasons, series 15 featured 18 contestants instead of the typical 24. Like the previous season, the season omitted the broadcast of the audition stage.

Subtitled Secrets & Surprises, this season saw a secret or surprise revealed to the contestants in every episode. One example was the introduction of a surprise "second chance apron", which was won by the winner of the first challenge in the season and kept secret from the rest of the contestants; it allowed the contestant to come back from elimination and compete for re-entry at the next elimination challenge.

Weekly immunity challenge winners had a chance to win an immunity pin by winning a cook-off against a professional chef. The winner was determined with a blind tasting by the judges, while Shannon Bennett mentored the contestants.

This was the first season not to feature any MasterClasses.

== Contestants ==
The full cast was announced on 23 April 2023. Former contestant Brent Draper, who withdrew from series 13 citing mental health concerns, returned as a contestant for the season.

Contestant	Age	State/Terr	Occupation	Status
Brent Draper	32	QLD	Digital content creator	Winner 16 July
Rhiannon Anderson	47	QLD	Administration manager	Runner-up 16 July
Declan Cleary	24	NSW	Carpenter	Third place 13 July
Theo Loizou	37	VIC	Electrician	Eliminated 11 July
Cath Collins	54	VIC	Administration manager	Eliminated 9 July
Malissa Fedele	28	SA	Nutritionist	Eliminated 2 July
Rue Mupedzi	30	WA	Oral health therapist	Eliminated 27 June
Adi Nevgi	31	VIC	Doctor	Eliminated 25 June
Ralph Kahango	32	WA	Auditor	Eliminated 20 June
Antonio Cruz Vaamonde	34	NSW	Software developer	Eliminated 18 June
Grace Jupp	24	VIC	Olive producer	Eliminated 13 June
Phil Conway	33	VIC	Fitness studio manager	Eliminated 11 June
Robbie Cooper	65	NT	Youth support worker	Eliminated 4 June
Alice Han	29	NSW	Economic researcher	Eliminated 30 May
Amy Tanner	26	VIC	Medical administrator	Eliminated 28 May
Larissa Sewell	38	SA	Stay-at-home mum	Re-eliminated 23 May; Returned 21 May; Eliminated 16 May
Jessica Perri	35	VIC	Optometrist	Eliminated 21 May
Andrea Puglisi	36	WA	Rope access technician	Eliminated 14 May

Future appearances

- In Series 16 Declan Cleary, Theo Loizou, Adi Nevgi, Grace Jupp, Phil Conway, Amy Tanner and Jessica Perri appeared as guests for the 1st Service challenge.
- Declan & Theo along with Rhiannon Anderson, Cath Collins and Rue Mupedzi appeared in Series 17. Cath was eliminated on 4 May 2025, finishing 23rd. Rhiannon was eliminated on 25 May 2025, finishing 18th. Rue was eliminated on 27 May 2025, finishing 17th. Theo was eliminated on 24 June 2025, finishing 12th and Declan was eliminated on 29 June 2025, finishing 11th.

== Guest chefs ==
Week	Guest	Challenge
1	Jamie Oliver	Series premiere
1	Hugh Allen	Immunity challenge
2 (Secrets to Success Week)	Poh Ling Yeow	Mystery box challenge
2 (Secrets to Success Week)	Emelia Jackson	Elimination challenge
2 (Secrets to Success Week)	Sashi Cheliah, Matt Sinclair	Service challenge
2 (Secrets to Success Week)	Darren Robertson	Immunity challenge
3 (Big Week)	Julie Goodwin	Elimination challenge
3 (Big Week)	Eddie Stewart	Pressure test
3 (Big Week)	Sergio Perera	Immunity challenge
4 (Nostalgia Week)	Donato Toce	Pressure test
4 (Nostalgia Week)	Gabriel Gaté	Immunity challenge
5 (Home Cooks vs. Pro Cooks Week)	Jacqui Challinor, Brendan Katich, Lakhan Bhounsle	Mystery box challenge
5 (Home Cooks vs. Pro Cooks Week)	Khanh Nguyen, Nicko Holloway, Christopher James, Melanie Shoona	Pressure test
5 (Home Cooks vs. Pro Cooks Week)	Louis Tikaram, Ben Skelton, Mark Tumacder	Team challenge
5 (Home Cooks vs. Pro Cooks Week)	Ross Magnaye, Leandro Miranda, Shane Stafford	Invention test
6	Rick Stein	Elimination challenge
6	Josh Niland	Mystery box challenge
6	Luke Nguyen	Pressure test
6	Curtis Stone	Service & immunity challenge
7	Maggie Beer	Elimination challenge
7	Nelly Robinson	Pressure test
7	Shannon Bennett	Service challenge
7	Kay-lene Tan	Immunity challenge
8	Clare Smyth	Pressure test
8	Blayne Bertoncello	Service challenge
8	Chase Kojima	Immunity challenge
9	Kirsten Tibballs	Elimination challenge
10 (Finals Week)	Peter Gilmore	Pressure test
10 (Finals Week)	Curtis Stone	Challenge
10 (Finals Week)	Shannon Bennett	Service challenge
Grand Finale	Amaury Guichon	Pressure test

== Elimination chart ==
No.	Week	1			2		3				4				5		6		7				8		9	Finals		Grand Finale
No.	Mystery Box Challenge Winner	None			Malissa		Antonio; Phil; Ralph				Antonio; Ralph				Grace		Antonio; Rhiannon		Declan; Rue				Brent; Theo		Brent	Brent		None
No.	Immunity Challenge	Antonio; Cath; Jessica; Malissa			Adi; Declan; Jessica; Malissa; Ralph; Robbie; Theo		Adi; Amy; Cath; Declan; Grace; Phil; Robbie				Adi; Brent; Cath; Declan; Malissa; Robbie; Theo				Antonio; Rhiannon		Adi; Brent; Ralph; Rhiannon; Rue		Brent; Declan; Malissa; Theo				Brent; Declan; Malissa; Theo		Brent; Declan; Theo	Brent		None
No.	Elimination Challenge Winner	Brent; Phil; Rue			Cath	None	Brent; Theo				None				None		None		None				Declan		Rhiannon; Theo	None		None
1	Brent	IN		Top 3	DNP	Btm 16	IN	Team Lose		Top 2	IN	Team Win	I.P.	IMM	Team Lose 3		IN	Btm 9	IN	Team Win		Btm 4	Top 2	Btm 5/Imm.	Btm 2	WIN	Top 2	WINNER
2	Rhiannon	IN		DNP	Btm 3	Btm 16	IN	Team Lose		Btm 3	IN	Team Lose		Btm 5	Team Win	IMM	Top 2	Btm 9	Btm 3	Team Lose		Btm 7	IN	Btm 2	WIN	Btm 2	Top 2	Runner-up
3	Declan	IN		DNP	Btm 7	Btm 4	Btm 2	Team Win	I.P.	IMM	Btm 3	Team Win		Btm 11	Btm 4/Imm.		IN	Btm 2	Top 2	Team Win		Btm 4	IN	WIN	IMM	Btm 3	3rd	Eliminated (Ep 49)
4	Theo	IN		DNP	Btm 7	IMM	Btm 3	Team Lose		Top 2	IN	Team Win		Btm 11	Team Lose 3		Btm 3	Btm 9	IN	Team Win		Btm 7	Top 2	IMM	WIN	Elim	Eliminated (Ep 47)	
5	Cath	IN		DNP	WIN	Btm 16	IN	Team Win		Btm 12	IN	Team Win		Btm 11	Team Lose 2		IN	Btm 9	IN	Team Lose		Btm 7	Btm 2	Btm 3	Elim	Eliminated (Ep 45)		
6	Malissa	IN		IMM	WIN	Btm 16	IN	Team Lose		Btm 3	IN	Team Win		Btm 2	Btm 3		IN	Btm 3	Btm 3	Team Win	I.P.	IMM	Btm 3/Imm.	Elim	Eliminated (Ep 40)			
7	Rue	Top 3		Top 3	DNP	Btm 4	IN	Team Lose		Btm 12	IN	Team Lose		Btm 5	Team Lose 3		IN	IMM	Top 2	Team Lose		Btm 2	Elim	Eliminated (Ep 37)				
8	Adi	IN		Btm 6	IN	Btm 16	IN	Team Win		Btm 12	IN	Team Win		Btm 11	Team Lose 2		Btm 2	Btm 9	IN	Team Lose		Elim	Eliminated (Ep 35)					
9	Ralph	IN		Btm 6	IN	Btm 16	Top 3	Team Lose		Btm 12	Top 2	Team Lose		Btm 5	Btm 2		IN	Btm 9	Elim	Eliminated (Ep 32)								
10	Antonio	IN		DNP	Btm 7	Btm 2	Top 3	Team Lose		Btm 12	Top 2	Team Lose		Btm 11	Team Win	IMM	Top 2	Elim	Eliminated (Ep 30)									
11	Grace	IN		Btm 6	Top 2	Btm 16	IN	Team Win		Btm 12	Btm 2	Team Lose		DNP	Team Win		Elim	Eliminated (Ep 27)										
12	Phil	IN		Top 3	IN	Btm 16	Top 3	Team Win		Btm 12	IN	Team Lose		Btm 11	Elim		Eliminated (Ep 25)											
13	Robbie	IN		Btm 3	IN	Btm 6	IN	Team Win		Btm 12	IN	Team Win		Elim	Eliminated (Ep 20)													
14	Alice	Top 3		DNP	Btm 3	Btm 16	IN	Team Lose		Btm 12	Elim	Eliminated (Ep 17)																
15	Amy	IN		Btm 3	IN	Btm 16	IN	Team Win		Elim	Eliminated (Ep 15)																	
16	Larissa	WIN	S.C.A.	DNP	Elim	Btm 6	Elim	Re-eliminated (Ep 12)																				
17	Jessica	IN		DNP	Btm 7	Elim	Eliminated (Ep 10)																					
18	Andrea	IN		Elim	Eliminated (Ep 5)																							
	Eliminated	None		Andrea	Larissa; 1st Elimination	Jessica	Larissa; Re-elimination	Amy			Alice	Robbie			Phil		Grace	Antonio	Ralph	Adi			Rue	Malissa	Cath	Theo	Declan	Rhiannon
	Eliminated	None		Andrea	Larissa; 1st Elimination	Jessica	Larissa; Re-elimination	Amy			Alice	Robbie			Phil		Grace	Antonio	Ralph	Adi			Rue	Malissa	Cath	Theo	Declan	Brent

== Episodes and ratings ==
Colour key:
– Highest rating during the series
– Lowest rating during the series

Ep#/Wk-Ep#	Original airdate	Episode title / event	Total viewers (five metro cities)	Nightly ranking
Week 1 (Surprises Week)
1/01-1	Sunday, 7 May 2023	Series Premiere: Secret Weapon Invention Test — The MasterChef kitchen welcomed celebrity chef Jamie Oliver as a guest judge for the next two days. The new contestants were tasked to cook with anything that represented their secret weapon. Larissa's borscht, Rue's tart and Alice's moon-chi emerged as the top 3, with Larissa's dish being considered the dish of the day. As a reward, Larissa received a 'second chance apron'. Should she be eliminated at any point in the competition, this will allow her to cook in the next elimination round for a chance to regain her place in the competition.	761,000	#3
2/01-2	Monday, 8 May 2023	Jamie Oliver Two-Round Challenge — The contestants cooked in a two-round challenge for a chance to compete for immunity. In the first round they had to cook a dish in 15 minutes; Andrea's spaghetti with clams, Antonio's cachapas, Grace's bruschetta (with greens, poached egg and bagna gauda), Jessica's butterflied prawns with chermoula sauce and Rhiannon's prawn coconut soup were the top 5 dishes. The top 5 then had to keep up with Jamie cooking his mushroom and spinach rotolo, with which Andrea and Rhiannon struggled but Antonio and Jessica were the top 2 and won a chance to compete for immunity.	557,000	#11
3/01-3	Tuesday, 9 May 2023	Flavour Bomb Invention Test — Jamie Oliver left behind four flavour bombs for the contestants to use. The contestants could cook anything with the assigned flavour bomb, however, the flavour bombs would only be revealed to them 15 minutes into the cook. These were harissa, pesto, Dijon mustard and red miso. Most of the dishes were well-received, with rave reviews for Rhiannon's rissoles, and Theo's flatbreads. However, two dishes emerged as the best for the day; Malissa's red miso and pumpkin ravioli, and Cath's thyme ice cream with Dijon caramel. As a result, Malissa and Cath were chosen to join Antonio and Jessica for the first immunity challenge.	497,000	#10
4/01-4	Wednesday, 10 May 2023	Immunity Challenge: Hugh Allen — In the first round, Antonio, Cath, Jessica and Malissa had to create a dish in 45 minutes using ingredients from Shannon Bennett's fridge. Malissa's fig and date cake with ginger caramel impressed the judges and won immunity from Sunday's elimination and the opportunity to win a pin, for which she has to cook against Hugh Allen. In 75 minutes, Malissa chose the potent pantry while Hugh had to cook with the pleasant pantry. Malissa's prawn and mushroom linguine won praise for the cooking of the prawns and bold flavour but criticized for the pasta not being al dente, scoring 22 points. Hugh's strawberry gum parfait with raspberries and roses was praised for being elegant and well-balanced scoring 27 points and winning the round.	436,000	#12
Week 2 (Secrets to Success Week)
5/02-1	Sunday, 14 May 2023	Childhood Memories Elimination Challenge — Before the challenge started, the judges announced that Alice, Antonio, Cath, Declan, Jessica, Larissa, Rhiannon and Theo are currently recovery from COVID and missed today's elimination. When they returned, they will cook in the next elimination to secure their places back in the competition fit and healthy. In the first of a two-round elimination challenge, the rest of the contestants except Malissa (who had immunity) had 60 minutes to cook a dish featuring one of the judges' nostalgic ingredients (Vegemite, cumquat or panettone). Brent's Middle Eastern chicken with hummus and cumquat glaze, Phil's pork fillet with parsnip & vanilla puree and Vegemite sauce, and Rue's cumquat Swiss roll received the best praise while Amy, Andrea and Robbie's dishes had issues which landed them in the second round, for which they had 60 minutes to make a dish inspired by their childhood memories. Robbie's fish curry with fried bread was the standout dish. Amy's caramel dumplings with Bailey's cream also received praise and the flavours were also good. Andrea's crepes were pretty good but his decision to put boiling water in his Nutella sauce turn out to be a mistake and he was eliminated.	478,000	#6
6/02-2	Monday, 15 May 2023	Poh Ling Yeow Mystery Box Challenge — The contestants from yesterday's elimination challenge except Brent and Rue (who had COVID) had 75 minutes to cook a dish using the mystery box created by Poh Ling Yeow which contained the pantry staples and two other ingredients of their choice. Ali's Portuguese tarts were undercooked while Phil's brownie with smoked vanilla ice cream was not balanced. Grace's chive & salmon roe waffles and Robbie's pasta carbonara received impressive feedback, but it was Malissa's citrus cannoli with mascarpone and orange curd that won the challenge, fast tracking her to the immunity challenge.	552,000	#9
7/02-3	Tuesday, 16 May 2023	Emelia Jackson Choux Pastry Elimination Challenge — Alice, Antonio, Cath, Declan, Jessica, Larissa, Rhiannon and Theo had to create choux buns in 75 minutes using Emelia Jackson's recipe while choosing either savoury or sweet flavour, with the bottom three having to highlight the other flavour in the second round. Cath's lemon mascarpone choux buns were the stand-out dish, receiving immediate safety from elimination. Declan, Antonio, Jessica and Theo also received praise, while Alice, Larissa and Rhiannon had issues with their choux and were sent to the second round. Both Rhiannon and Alice's savoury buns managed to redeem them while Larissa's sweet choux was unbalanced, which resulted in her elimination. However, with the second-chance apron she has the opportunity to cook in the next elimination challenge for a chance to rejoin the competition.	492,000	#8
8/02-4	Wednesday, 17 May 2023	Featured Ingredients Service Challenge — The contestants except for Malissa (who won the mystery box challenge and is through to the immunity challenge), and Brent, Rue and Amy (recovering from COVID), were split into two teams. The green team (Alice, Antonio, Cath, Grace, Phil and Rhiannon) led by Matt Sinclair, and the blue team (Adi, Declan, Jessica, Ralph, Robbie and Theo) led by Sashi Cheliah, had to cook a two-course meal for 30 guests. The judges revealed the choices for each course: cucumber, eggplant or pumpkin for entrée and chicken, coral trout or pork belly for main. Both teams delivered on their entrées with the blue team serving prawns with cucumber granita and the green team serving miso-glazed eggplant. While the blue team's main of yellow fish curry with cumin rice was a success, the green team's main of twice-cooked pork with mango salad had nice flavours but the pork was portioned inconsistently. The blue team delivered on both courses, and they advance for an opportunity to cook for immunity.	408,000	#13
9/02-5	Thursday, 18 May 2023	Immunity Challenge: Darren Robertson — In the first round, Adi, Declan, Jessica, Malissa, Ralph, Robbie and Theo had to create a dish in 45 minutes by using roast chicken. Theo's chicken lahmacun with tzatsiki impressed the judges and won immunity from Sunday's elimination and the opportunity to win an immunity pin, for which he had to cook against Darren Robertson. Theo chose the 60 minutes with 10 ingredients pantry and gave Darren the 30 minutes with 20 ingredients pantry. Theo's apple tart with lemon custard was praised for its flavours and technique but was criticized for his presentation and the tart pastry being too thick, scoring 23 points. Darren served a feast in 30 minutes which was a whole barramundi with pickled cabbage, flatbread and mango chili vinegar and was praised for the cooking of the fish as well as complex flavours, scoring 25 points and winning the round.	421,000	#9
Week 3 (Big Week)
10/03-1	Sunday, 21 May 2023	Julie Goodwin Seafood Stew Elimination Challenge — The contestants aside from Theo faced a two-round challenge. In round one, they took turns identifying the ingredients from Julie Goodwin's seafood stew by taste. Antonio, Declan, Jessica, Robbie and Rue were the first five to guess incorrectly and were sent to the second round where the judges revealed they would be joined by Larissa who has to survive to get back into the competition. In this round, they had 75 minutes to cook a dish using the ingredients from Julie's stew recipe without the under-bench staples. Robbie's seafood and tomato soup was hailed dish of the day, while Larissa's pelmeni and broth were praised, earning her the right to come back. Rue's mussels with white wine and tomato sauce received good compliments as well as Declan's prawn and snapper soup though his flatbread was more of a crispy bread and the wrong bread to serve, Antonio's snapper empanadas had great flavours but were too oily. However, it was Jessica's dish of Spaghetti Al Pomodoro missed the mark. While her pomodoro had the flavour in the sauce which was taken to the next level, her decision to make an eggless pasta with bread flour proved to be her undoing as the pasta was criticized for being the wrong texture. The judges felt that Jessica's safe choice was the wrong choice for today's pantry limitations, and Jessica was eliminated.	492,000	#5
11/03-2	Monday, 22 May 2023	Giant Mystery Box Challenge — The contestants were given 75 minutes to cook a dish using large ingredients such as a large Toblerone, whole pumpkin, whole tuna, cassia-bark, rhubarb and sack of peanuts, with the bottom three facing elimination. Antonio's Toblerone and peanut ice cream sandwich, Phil's ice cream sandwich with Toblerone ice cream and orange sugar tuile and Ralph's 'busted' milk tart received the highest praise for the judges and were the top 3 dishes. However, Declan's peanut-crusted tuna with pumpkin puree was criticized for lacking texture and was overwhelmed by peanut flavour, Theo's rough puff pastry for his rhubarb millefeuille was more of a shortcrust pastry and Larissa's ravioli lacked filling and the sauce was rushed. As a result, the latter three ended up in elimination.	483,000	#11
12/03-3	Tuesday, 23 May 2023	Pressure Test: Eddie Stewart's Tokyo Lamington Tower — Chef Eddie Stewart set the pressure test, which required Declan, Larissa and Theo to recreate his Tokyo lamington tower in five hours. Theo's was declared the best with perfect sponge, presentation and flavours while Declan's was praised for the flavours matching the original and a nice sponge despite looking a little rough and the chocolate coating of the Snicker's lamington was a little too thick. Larissa had flaws both in presentation and taste, her flavours were unbalanced with too much peanut on one, not enough yuzu curd on the other and she had to make her caramel four times, which put her behind, rushing the presentation and making the lamingtons too big and clumsy. The judges felt that Larissa had missed the brief and she was eliminated once again.	472,000	#9
13/03-4	Wednesday, 24 May 2023	Grazeland Street Food Service Challenge — The 15 contestants were taken to Grazeland food court in Spotswood for a team challenge, where they were split into two teams. The turquoise team (Amy, Cath, Declan, Grace, Phil, Robbie and captain Adi) and the yellow team (Alice, Antonio, Ralph, Rhiannon, Rue, Theo and captain Brent) were given five hours to prepare a surf and turf street food menu serving 1600 people. Malissa drew a white apron and sat out; she had to back a team and receive their outcome She chose the yellow team. At the halfway point both teams struggled to keep on time, so Andy helped the turquoise team while Jock helped the yellow team. The turquoise team's Thai red barramundi curry was praised for the cooking of the fish, presentation and flavour, while their Thai beef salad was praised for its cooking of the beef and textures, though the dressing was criticized for not being sweet enough. The yellow team had trouble with the portions of the mussels and had to continue cooking them during service time while Alice struggled to maintain the consistency of the cooking of the fried rice. Their surf dish of chili mussels was praised while their red braised pork belly was flavoursome, but the fried rice had an overwhelming flavour of burnt garlic. The judges felt that the yellow team's burnt garlic flavour cost them the challenge giving the turquoise team the win, and they were granted the chance to cook for immunity.	365,000	#15
14/03-5	Thursday, 25 May 2023	Immunity Challenge: Sergio Perera — In the first round, Adi, Amy, Cath, Declan, Grace, Phil and Robbie had to create a dish in 75 minutes using only the kitchen appliances in the gift box on their bench. While all of the dishes were praised, it was Declan's Thai chicken broth with peanut and lime sambal that won immunity from Sunday's elimination, as well as a $10,000 voucher and the opportunity to win an immunity pin, for which he had to cook against Sergio Perera. From four flavour pairings, Declan chose the mandarin and tarragon combination with which he is given 75 minutes, while Sergio with 60 minutes chose the blueberry and chestnut mushroom flavour combination. Sergio's pan seared snapper with fennel and mushroom puree was praised for the cooking of the fish, strong blueberry flavour, silkiness of the puree and presentation but was criticized for not having the mushroom flavour strong enough and the flavour combinations were not cohesive, scoring 22 points. Declan's steamed kingfish with tarragon beurre blanc and mandarin salad received fantastic reviews for the cooking of the fish and hitting the brief for the perfect balance of flavour, scoring 25 points, winning the round and being the first contestant this year to win an immunity pin.	390,000	#11
Week 4 (Nostalgia Week)
15/04-1	Sunday, 28 May 2023	Overnight Elimination Challenge — The contestants aside from Declan faced a two-day elimination cook-off, where they were given 45 minutes to prepare a dish of their choice and leave it to cook overnight, then 60 minutes to finish it the next day. Brent's crispy duck with pickled turmeric and sambal and Theo's Greek lamb with pita bread and tzatziki were given the most praise from the judges with Melissa awarding both dishes 10/10. Amy, Malissa and Rhiannon had the most criticisms of their dishes. Although her coconut sambal was good, Rhiannon's beef rendang was overcooked and the flavours were out of balance. Malissa's pork & beef ragu lacked freshness, had average flavour and the pasta was too thin. Amy's Mexican and Japanese braised pork tacos were dry, lacked flavour and the tortillas were too thick. While the judges felt that both Malissa and Amy's dishes had flaws, they felt that Amy's dish failed to meet the brief and was 'irredeemable', and she was the fourth contestant to be eliminated.	497,000	#6
16/04-2	Monday, 29 May 2023	Cereal Mystery Box Challenge — The contestants were given 75 minutes to cook a dish using at least one of the cereals in the mystery box (Coco Pops, Weet-Bix, Corn flakes, Fruit Loops and Rice Bubbles) with an open pantry and the garden; the bottom three would face elimination. Antonio's coco pops éclairs and Ralph's corn flake pork chop with mashed potato and mint sauce received the highest praise from the judges and were the top two dishes. Most of the contestants had problems with their dishes but Grace's fruit loop pop tart cereal had technical issues, despite being creative and thinking outside of the box, Declan's three breakfast cereal muffins were dry and Alice's fruit loop parfait was split. Having cooked the bottom 3 dishes, Grace, Declan and Alice were send to the pressure test.	511,000	#12
17/04-3	Tuesday, 30 May 2023	Pressure Test: Donato Toce's Messinetta — Chef Donato Toce set the pressure test, which required Alice, Declan and Grace to recreate his Messinetta in four hours and fifteen minutes. Declan's was declared the best with perfect flavours of the strawberry gel and the vanilla and chocolate gelato, perfect textures with the gelato and gel well set, the crunch of the tempered chocolate and the best presented, despite looking a little rough around the edges. Alice started off strong and even though her chocolate was very nicely temper, the texture of both of her gelatos were a little bit off. During the cook, Grace had several issues with her strawberry gel and her vanilla gelato which put her behind, and while the flavours were good, the construction was very rough. The judges felt that both Alice and Grace had left the door open with their dishes in different ways, but when it came to the taste, they all agreed that Grace's dessert was deemed better than Alice's. Because the gelato was the foundation of Donato's dish, the judges felt that Alice had missed the mark, and although her dish looked very similar to Donato's, it tasted very different, and Alice was eliminated.	482,000	#9
18/04-4	Wednesday, 31 May 2023	Mei Jing Chinese Dine In Service Challenge — The 13 contestants were taken to Mei Jing restaurant in Wantirna for a team challenge, where they were split into two teams. The red team (Brent, Cath, Declan, Malissa, Robbie and captain Theo) and the purple team (Antonio, Grace, Phil, Ralph, Rhiannon and captain Rue) were given three hours to prepare a three-course meal, inspired by the restaurant menu, serving 50 dinners. Adi drew a white apron and sat out; she had to back a team and receive their outcome. She chose the red team. On the red team, their entrée of pork san choy bow was praised for being served in cos lettuce, as well as the juiciness of the pork and the complex flavours, thanks to the addition of duck fat. Their main of beef and black bean with fried rice, led by Declan, was praised for the cooking and tenderness of the beef, the flavours of the sauce, different textures of the vegetables and being loaded with black beans. The dessert of lychees and vanilla ice cream was a miss with the ice cream not set. On the purple team, the entrée of pork and prawn spring rolls was delicious, but the sauce didn't pay off in the final dish. The lemon chicken main was tasty enough, crispy and cooked well and there was a nice hum of ginger throughout the dish, but the lemon sauce didn't have enough lemon flavour due to the sauce being prepared too late and it was missing in action. Jock thought that their main didn't hit the brief of being nostalgic. The dessert of pineapple fritter with vanilla ice cream was also a miss due to the ice cream not setting. The red team despite their dessert issues; the judges felt that the first two courses were better than the purple team, and they were granted the chance to cook for immunity.	402,000	#13
19/04-5	Thursday, 1 June 2023	Immunity Challenge: Gabriel Gaté — In the first round, Adi, Brent, Cath, Declan, Malissa, Robbie and Theo were shown by Shannon Bennett how to use a flambé technique with which they had 75 minutes to cook a dish. While all of the dishes were praised, it was Brent's bourbon chicken skewers that won immunity from Sunday's elimination and the opportunity to win an immunity pin, for which he had to cook against Gabriel Gate. The second round required a dish featuring a beverage. Brent chose orange juice for which he is given 75 minutes, while Gabriel with 60 minutes chose champagne. Gabriel's prawn and mussel casserole with julienne vegetables and champagne sauce received praise for the flavour of the sauce, the textures and cooking of the vegetables and for the seafood (though Andy got an undercooked prawn), scoring 25 points. Brent's orange duck with nam jim salad and crispy pancakes receive positive comments on the presentation, cooking of the duck with the glaze, crispness of the pancake and the powerful yet balanced flavour, scoring 30 points, winning the round and being the second contestant this year to win an immunity pin.	409,000	#11
Week 5 (Home Cooks vs. Pro Cooks Week)
20/05-1	Sunday, 4 June 2023	Aussie Classic Elimination Challenge — Before the challenge started, the judges announced that Grace was not feeling well enough to complete in today's elimination due to the flu season and fever and as a result, she must complete in the next elimination. In round one, the rest of the contestants aside from Brent (who had immunity) took turns identifying different cheeses. Malissa, Ralph, Rhiannon, Robbie and Rue were the first five to guess incorrectly and were sent to the second round where they had 75 minutes to cook a dish inspired by classic Aussie dishes. Rhiannon wowed the judges with her take on moussaka while Rue's Swiss roll trifle with strawberries and vanilla, and Ralph's sticky date trifle also received praise. Malissa wanted to cook a bolognese ravioli but had several issues during the cook as the filling was too warm, the pasta dough had cracks and it stuck to her cooking bench, so with 10 minutes left, she had to pivot for fettuccine bolognese. While the sauce was flavourful and well balanced, the pasta was too thick and because of that, it had no structure to it at all. Because the pasta was the foundation, Malissa's last-minute decision really upset the judges and they felt that was the wrong decision for the timeframe. Robbie wanted to cook his curry with sausages, but he was worried when the judges pointed out that it was the same curry over again and he pivoted to a take on prawn cocktail using his curry sauce for the mayonnaise. His prawns were overcooked, and the curry sauce flavour didn't mesh well with the texture of the lettuce. Despite the pasta issue, the judges felt that Malissa's flavour was enough to save her, and Robbie was the sixth contestant to be eliminated.	483,000	#6
21/05-2	Monday, 5 June 2023	NOMAD Mystery Box Challenge — Every challenge this week was a home cook vs professional cook battle where contestants competed with one of four chef teams to win immunity from Sunday's elimination challenge. The first group, consisting of Antonio, Grace and Rhiannon, cooked against Jacqui Challinor's team from NOMAD. Each team had 75 minutes to each cook a dish using at least one of the ingredients from the mystery box: pork chop, sand crab, pineapple, fennel, watercress, betel leaf, jerk beans, rosella flowers and Hello Panda biscuits. Whoever cooks the best dish will win for their team. For team NOMAD two dishes had praise for their flavours but it was Jacqui's crab and fennel salad that was the judges' highlight. For the home cook team both Rhiannon and Antonio's dishes were praised for the flavour but Antonio was criticized for not cooking the rosella flower in his jam long enough. It was Grace's tempura betel leaf with pork, pineapple and rosella sauce, and salsa that was declared faultless by the judges. After much discussion, the judges decided that the dish of the day was Grace's which means that she saved Antonio and Rhiannon from Sunday's elimination. Unfortunately, as she missed the last elimination challenge, she has to participate in the next elimination challenge.	427,000	#14
22/05-3	Tuesday, 6 June 2023	Pressure Test: Khanh Nguyen's Three-Course Meal — Chef Khanh Nguyen set the pressure test, which required Malissa, Phil and Ralph to cook against Nick Holloway's team from Nu Nu to recreate his macadamia tofo with Skull Island prawns, tamarind, lemon myrtle for entrée in two hours and thirty minutes; wagyu rendang pie with Vietnamese satay, pickled daikon radish for main in three hours and forty five minutes; and a kaya jam ice cream sandwich with Davidson plum and salted koji waffle for dessert in two hours and fifteen minutes. The team with the most wins will win the round. Nick won the entrée round even though his tofu was a little firm and salty; the rest of the flavour and presentation were like Khanh's. While Malissa's flavours were praised her tofu wasn't set enough. Christopher won the main with perfect pastry, balanced flavours and cooking of the beef while Phil's flavours were too spicy as he forgot to blitz the spices before adding them into the curry. It was Phil's dry pastry that cost him the win. Melanie won the dessert with perfect flavours in the parfait, jam and waffle as the judges felt it closely resembled Khanh's. While Ralph's parfait was praised, his waffle was not crunchy enough. Nick's team won in a clean sweep, which means that Malissa, Phil and Ralph have to participate in Sunday's elimination challenge.	434,000	#9
23/05-4	Wednesday, 7 June 2023	Non-Verbal Relay Team Challenge — Adi, Cath and Declan had to cook against Louis Tikaram's team from Stanley restaurant in a relay team challenge, given twenty five minutes each without communicating during the changeover. Benson started for team Stanley and opted to cook a Cantonese feast of crispy skin chicken, steamed fish and Asian greens, while Declan opted to do an Asian-styled steamed snapper with coconut rice and salad. Declan's choice proved to be their downfall as Cath struggled with the concept and didn't make the sauce properly. While Adi managed to rectify the sauce, she put the fish in the steamer too late and it was undercooked; the rest of the dish was nice but not spectacular. Team Stanley managed to deliver on the dish with perfect cooking of the proteins and highlighting Cantonese cuisine, with their flavours winning the round, which means that Adi, Cath and Declan have to participate in Sunday's elimination challenge.	399,000	#15
24/05-5	Thursday, 8 June 2023	Ingredients or Time Invention Test — Brent, Rue and Theo had to cook against Ross Magnaye's team from Serai Kitchen and had up to 75 minutes to cook a dish using up to twelve sets of ingredients, with one set becoming available every four minutes. The dish of the day will win for their team. Theo and Leandro were the first to start, with both making wagyu beef dishes with bone marrow butter in 59 minutes. Rue made a lemon parfait with meringue and blueberry compote in 55 minutes. Ross made beef kilawin with bone marrow butter in 39 minutes. Shane made Moreton Bay bugs with palapa butter and fruit salsa in 35 minutes. Brent started as the final set of ingredients was made available to cook scampi and Bay bug stuffed zucchini flowers with caviar, having only 31 minutes. Both Rue and Theo receive mixed reviews, Rue for trying to do too much in the time and for Theo, while his steak was beautiful, the rest of the dish did not have enough acidity. Brent's dish was declared perfect being the stand-out from the home cooks. Leandro's dish received praise but both Ross and Shane's were declared faultless. As their team received more perfect dishes they won the round, which means that Brent, Rue and Theo have to participate in Sunday's elimination challenge.	393,000	#10
Week 6
25/06-1	Sunday, 11 June 2023	Rick Stein Travel Elimination Challenge — The contestants aside from Antonio and Rhiannon faced a two-round challenge set by Rick Stein. In round one they had 45 minutes to cook a dish with squid where the bottom four would face round two. Declan, Malissa, Phil and Ralph's dishes were criticized, and they were sent to the second round, where they had 75 minutes to cook a dish from a cuisine that Rick had the fondest memories from his travels. Declan chose Mexico but he was rattled by his first-round cook and struggled to the point where he used his immunity pin. Malissa chose Italy and her honey and olive oil panna cotta with lemon crumb and charred apricots received high praise from the judges. Ralph chose France and did a deconstructed croque madame with soft poached egg and potato foam. The dish was praised for its flavours but the judges didn't think it was better than the original. However, it was Phil who chose Italy that tried to make spaghetti con anatra which turned out to be a big mistake since the duck was dry, the pasta didn't have structure and he didn't have enough time to develop the flavour, resulting in him being the seventh contestant to be eliminated.	397,000	#8
26/06-2	Monday, 12 June 2023	John Dory Mystery Box Challenge — The mystery box was set by chef Josh Niland. It contained different cuts of John Dory fish, with which they had 75 minutes to cook a dish. Most of the contestants' dishes received praise, particularly Antonio's dory al asado negro with cauliflower puree and plantain chips and Rhiannon's hibachi-grilled Dory with Asian apple salad and nam jim dressing. However, Adi's Dory cheek rice cakes with crispy skin had nice Indian flavours but it didn't highlight the fish enough to meet the brief, while Theo's Dory khachapuri had the fish cooked perfectly but the bread was undercooked, and Grace's fried John Dory was overcooked despite a nice hot and sour sauce. Having cooked the bottom three dishes, Adi, Theo and Grace were sent to the pressure test.	511,000	#8
27/06-3	Tuesday, 13 June 2023	Pressure Test: Luke Nguyen's No Recipe Beef Pho — Chef Luke Nguyen set the pressure test, which required Adi, Grace and Theo to recreate his beef pho without a recipe in two hours. Even though Theo was unsure at the start, his was the closest to the original with the cooking of the beef and noodles, clarity of the broth and well-balanced seasoning. Adi was confident at the start due to her experience cooking pho but she struggled with the rice noodles mixture setting her behind. As a result, while the beef was cooked beautifully and the broth was clear, it lacked seasoning. However, it was Grace's decision to roast the beef bones before adding them to the broth that proved to be her downfall. While her noodles were perfect and her pho was well-seasoned, the broth was too fatty and not clear. Overall, the judges felt that Grace had missed the brief and she was eliminated, finalising the Top 10.	501,000	#8
28/06-4	Wednesday, 14 June 2023	Root Vegetable Service Challenge — The contestants except for Theo (who was unwell) were split into two teams; the green team (Adi, Brent, Ralph, Rue and captain Rhiannon) and the brown team (Antonio, Cath, Declan and Malissa) had to cook a two-course meal for 24 guests. The judges revealed the choices of root vegetables to highlight beetroot, parsnip, sweet potato and turnip. The brown team with one less team member chose sweet potato first and were given three hours to prepare while the green team chose beetroot and were given two hours and 30 minutes to prepare, both teams were managed by chef Curtis Stone. Despite the advantage, the brown team took too long to figure out which dishes to cook and not having a team captain proved to be difficult, as the main of eye fillet with sweet potato puree and tahini dressing had great flavours but Declan struggled to cook the beef consistently. As for the dessert, a sweet potato tart with spiced ice cream and sweet potato caramel, Cath forgot to make the caramel until the last minute and Antonio cooked the tarts too late. As a result, the custard for the tarts was too soft and grainy despite a good crust. The green team's main of charred octopus with beetroot had perfectly cooked octopus and great flavours but the beetroot was cooked inconsistently. The dessert prepared by Ralph and Rue, a goat's cheese crémeux, beetroot consommé and poached pear was declared perfect by the judges. The green team won the challenge and will cook for immunity.	415,000	#13
29/06-5	Thursday, 15 June 2023	Condiment Immunity Challenge — In the first round, Curtis Stone announced that Adi, Brent, Ralph, Rhiannon and Rue have to make their own condiment (sauce, relish, jam or chutney) in 45 minutes. Brent's mango chili sauce, Rhiannon's 'troppo' chutney (mango and pineapple) and Rue's 'barbeRue' sauce (sweet and spicy barbecue) were chosen as the top 3 condiments to move on to round 2 where they had 75 minutes to make a dish that pairs well with the condiment. Brent's coral trout tacos worked well with the sauce, but the tortillas were too blonde, while Rhiannon's prawn three ways was praised for the cooking of the prawns and the ability to show her chutney in various ways. Rue's ribs and chicken were declared a success with the sauce being a perfect glaze for the pork ribs and wonderful flavour for the chicken. The judges decided that Rue's dish was the best, winning her immunity from Sunday's elimination and having her sauce on sale at Coles supermarkets for a limited time.	384,000	#10
Week 7
30/07-1	Sunday, 18 June 2023	Maggie Beer Gamble Elimination Challenge — The contestants, aside from Rue, faced a two-round challenge set by Maggie Beer. They had to choose from two ingredients allocated to them, one visible and the other underneath a cloche. Antonio was the only one who chose the cloche. In round one they had 60 minutes to cook a dish with whatever ingredient they choose, where the bottom three would face round two. Antonio, Declan and Malissa's dishes were criticized, and they were sent to the second round, where they had another 60 minutes to cook a dish with the ingredient, they hadn't chosen for the first cook. Malissa had raisins and made a rum and raisin semifreddo with hazelnut crumb and raisin compote. She was praised by the judges for the silkiness of the semifreddo and the flavour of the compote as well as the texture. Declan had carraway seeds; his carraway and tomato baked Murray cod with tahini dressing was cooked beautifully, but he had to remake his tomato sauce and was criticised for the lack of flavour and depth. However, Antonio, who had kalamata olives, chose to make a goat's cheese and olive caramel mille feuille. While the flavour combination was on point, the puff pastry was more like a shortbread which took away the essence of a mille feuille, resulting in him being the ninth contestant to be eliminated.	431,000	#7
31/07-2	Monday, 19 June 2023	Surprise Mystery Box Challenge — The mystery box contained confetti that exploded in front of the contestants, the theme was for the contestants to cook a dish in 75 minutes that surprises the judges. The performance of the contestants was a mixed bag but Declan's green curry choux buns and Rue's white chocolate mousse with passionfruit gel shaped like an egg were named the top 2 of the day. However, Malissa's lemon and vanilla cake with berry compote surprise proved to be the wrong dish as it was too basic, the cake was dry and the surprise element, which was the compote, which was rushed and didn't ooze out. Ralph made cinnamon parfait with salted caramel and apple compote. While the flavours were good, there was not enough caramel, and it didn't ooze out, failing to meet the brief. While Rhiannon's Thai-flavoured chicken ballotine with fondant potatoes looked beautiful on the outside, the mousse was overcooked. Having cooked the bottom three dishes, Malissa, Ralph and Rhiannon were sent to the pressure test.	493,000	#12
32/07-3	Tuesday, 20 June 2023	Pressure Test: Nelly Robinson's Mr McGregor Garden — Nelly Robinson presented his dessert Mr McGregor Garden to Malissa, Ralph and Rhiannon. Malissa's re-creation was deemed to be the closest to the original, and although Rhiannon was criticised for her presentation, her flavours were balanced. Ralph decided to take on the complex recipe slow and steady, which lead to him falling behind and rushing through parts of the dish. This caused the flavours to be unbalanced, the carrot cake to be undercooked, and the crumb to be overcooked. The judges decided his dish was the furthest away from the original, resulting in him being the tenth contestant to be eliminated.	448,000	#9
33/07-4	Wednesday, 21 June 2023	Temple of Boom Service Challenge — The contestants visit the Temple of Boom art installation at the National Gallery of Victoria for a Greek service challenge with Shannon Bennett. They were split into two teams; the red team (Brent, Declan, Malissa, and Theo) and the navy team (Adi, Cath, Rhiannon, and Rue), and were given 2 hours and 30 minutes to prepare a main and a dessert featuring contemporary Greek cuisine. The red team's main of lamb shoulder with skordalia and the navy team's main of Greek seafood stew were both praised by the judges. The red team's dessert of galaktoboureko received praise on its flavour and textures. While the navy team's dessert of Greek yoghurt mousse had good flavours in each of its components, the dish lacked cohesion. As a result, the red team won the challenge, and were given a chance to cook for immunity.	365,000	#15
34/07-5	Thursday, 22 June 2023	Immunity Challenge: Kay-Lene Tan — In the first round, Brent, Declan, Malissa, and Theo were given one hour to cook a dessert featuring coffee. While Declan's coffee crème caramel with coffee ice cream was praised by the judges, Malissa's coffee parfait was deemed to have the best use of coffee, winning her immunity from Sunday's elimination and a chance to win an immunity pin. In the second round, Malissa and executive pastry chef Kay-Lene Tan had to cook a dish featuring tea. Malissa, with 75 minutes, chose jasmine tea, while Kay-Lene, with 60 minutes chose baihao yinzhen tea. Malissa's jasmine tea-smoked chicken received praise for its cooking and the use of tea, scoring 24 points. Kay-Lene's tea sponge cake with tea ice cream and pears had flaws in its execution, scoring 19 points. As a result, Malissa became the third contestant this year to win an immunity pin.	371,000	#11
Week 8
35/08-1	Sunday, 25 June 2023	Colours Elimination Challenge — The contestants aside from Malissa faced a two-round challenge. In the first round, the contestants took turns identifying flavours from petri dishes containing flavoured pearls. Adi, Declan, Rue, and Brent were the first four to guess incorrectly, sending them to the second round, in which they had to cook a dish featuring their assigned colour. Brent (yellow), who elected not to use his pin, and Declan (red) received praise for their dishes of octopus yellow curry and khao mu daeng respectively. While Rue's (orange) dish of lemon verbena parfait with apricots was criticised for the parfait being soft and the coulis being boozy, Adi's (green) dish of kingfish sashimi with zhug was unbalanced and the presentation was rushed, resulting in her being the eleventh contestant to be eliminated.	460,000	#6
36/08-2	Monday, 26 June 2023	Everything Mystery Box Challenge — The Everything Box contained parsley, sugar snap peas, sherry, labneh, fenugreek, bacon, lamb, and garlic, with the contestants given 75 minutes to present a dish featuring every component. Brent and Theo were declared the winners of the challenge, with their dishes of lamb koftas and lamb skewers respectively. However, Cath's sherry jus was burnt during the challenge, Rue's fenugreek sauce was very bitter and unbalanced and Malissa's lamb spring salad with labneh was criticised for having too much whipped labneh. Having cooked the bottom 3 dishes, Cath, Rue, and Malissa were sent to the pressure test.	485,000	#12
37/08-3	Tuesday, 27 June 2023	Pressure Test: Clare Smyth's Beef and Oyster — Chef Clare Smyth set the pressure test, which required Cath, Malissa, and Rue to re-create her take on a beef and oyster pie in five hours. With 10 seconds to go, Malissa elected to use her pin, leaving only Cath and Rue's dishes to be tasted. Both Cath and Rue were missing components in their dishes, leaving out the fried oyster crisp and sliced raw wagyu beef respectively. Although Cath left out the fried oyster crisp, the flavours in her dish impressed the judges. Rue, who had burnt her sauce in the cook, was criticised for the flavours in her sauce and for undercooking the beef, resulting in her being the twelfth contestant to be eliminated.	452,000	#9
38/08-4	Wednesday, 28 June 2023	O.MY Restaurant Service Challenge — The contestants were taken to O.MY restaurant in Beaconsfield for a team challenge with chef Blayne Bertoncello. They were split into three teams: the brown team (Malissa and Theo), the grey team (Cath and Rhiannon), and the green team (Brent and Declan), with the top two teams advancing to the immunity challenge. Each team had to choose a fruit or vegetable from the restaurant's farm to feature in their dish and were given two hours to prepare their allocated course. The brown team chose basil and were allocated entrée, cooking a ricotta and basil raviolo with basil oil. The dish impressed the judges on its balance, finesse, and use of basil, winning the dish of the day. The grey team chose limes and were allocated main course, cooking grilled flathead with a kaffir lime broth and curry broth. While the judges liked the dish, they found the flavours to be restrained. The green team chose tomatoes and were allocated dessert, cooking a tomato honey panna cotta with strawberry and tomato granita and a black garlic glaze. Despite the challenge of using tomatoes in a dessert, the judges were impressed with the dish, praising it on its flavours and creativity. The judges declared the brown team and the green team the winners of the team challenge, advancing them to the immunity challenge.	460,000	#15
39/08-5	Thursday, 29 June 2023	Immunity Challenge: Chase Kojima — In the first round, Brent, Declan, Malissa, and Theo were given one hour to cook a dish featuring sound. Theo's dish of crispy betel leaf with grilled kangaroo was deemed to be the best, winning him immunity from Sunday's elimination and a chance to win the final immunity pin of the season. In the second round, Theo and chef Chase Kojima had to cook a dish using a large pantry with a limited range of equipment or a small pantry with a wide range of equipment. Theo, with 75 minutes, chose the large pantry, cooking Mexican pork with salsa. Chase, with 60 minutes, was allocated the small pantry, cooking bonito tataki with Moreton Bay bug tempura. The limitations with the ingredients and equipment proved to be a challenge for both, with both dishes deemed to have flaws. Theo was praised for the cooking of his pork, but his sauce was criticised for having too many ingredients, affecting its flavour; he scored 20 points. Chase was praised for the cooking of his bonito, but his Moreton Bay bug tempura was criticised for its texture and for lacking crunch, scoring 21 points, and narrowly winning the round.	380,000	#13
Week 9
40/09-1	Sunday, 2 July 2023	Kirsten Tibballs Dessert Elimination Challenge — The contestants aside from Theo faced a two-round challenge set by Kirsten Tibballs, who presented her favourite dessert ingredients. The contestants had to split the ingredients and 90 minutes, with the bottom three in the first round only getting whatever ingredients and time they had left after the first round to use in the second round. In the first round, Brent elected to use his immunity pin, which meant that only one contestant would be safe from cooking in the second round. While Cath, Rhiannon and Malissa's dishes had several issues, Declan, who took a risk by leaving only 33 minutes for the second round, cooked choux buns with raspberry craquelin and hazelnut praline, which impressed the judges with its flavours and technique and was dish of the day, receiving immediate safety from elimination, and therefore winning the first round and secure his place in the Top 5. In the second round, Rhiannon, with 49 minutes remaining, cooked a chocolate fondant with hazelnut ice cream and a lemon crumb. While the judges liked the flavours, the chocolate fondant had not held its shape, resulting in the cake and the sauce on the plate instead of the sauce being inside the cake. Cath, with 38 minutes remaining, cooked a flourless chocolate cake with a vanilla bean ice cream and raspberry coulis, which impressed the judges with its flavours and textures. Malissa, with 39 minutes remaining, cooked a hazelnut ice cream sandwich with a chocolate ganache. While the judges liked the flavour of the hazelnut ice cream and the chocolate ganache that were well balanced, the biscuits had too much baking powder in them, which affected the flavour of the dish. In the end, the judges felt that Malissa failed to meet the brief and she was eliminated.	411,000	#9
41/09-2	Monday, 3 July 2023	Garden Mystery Box Challenge — The judges announced that over the next three challenges, the maker of the best dish in each challenge will be granted a place in Thursday's immunity challenge to compete for a fast-track to Finals Week. The mystery box contained tomatoes and gardening equipment, with the contestants given 60 minutes and an open pantry to present a dish featuring tomatoes and at least two ingredients from the garden. The result was a mixed bag, with the judges criticising Theo's dolmades for having underdeveloped flavours, Cath's summer lasagna for having flawed ricotta, and Rhiannon's hibachi-grilled snapper with eggplant and tomato relish for having raw snapper. While Declan's Thai fried fish was praised on the cooking on the fish and its presentation, the flavours in Brent's braised pork belly with a tomato salsa and adobo sauce was deemed to be perfect, winning him the first spot in Thursday's immunity challenge.	508,000	#11
42/09-3	Tuesday, 4 July 2023	All Saints Estate Time Auction Challenge — The Top 5 were taken to All Saints Estate in Wahgunyah, where Cath, Declan, Rhiannon, and Theo competed in a time auction. The contestants had 120 minutes to bid on proteins, fruit and vegetables, and pantry extras. Cath had 55 minutes to cook with rabbit, root vegetables, and fresh herbs, cooking rabbit fricassee. While the judges liked the concept of the dish, the liver was undercooked, and the sauce was unbalanced. Declan had 50 minutes to cook with Murray cod, alliums and dried spices, cooking a grilled Murray cod and charred leek with onion jam and crispy shallots. The judges deemed the cooking of the cod to be restaurant-worthy and liked the flavour of the leeks. However, the crispy shallots were burnt, affecting the overall flavour of the dish. Rhiannon had 30 minutes to cook with yabbies, leafy greens, and vinegar and wines, cooking grilled yabbies with a rocket salad. Due to only having 30 minutes to cook, Rhiannon struggled with time throughout the challenge, changing her dish mid-cook. Consequently, the judges criticised the dish for being rushed, with the yabbies undercooked. Theo had 40 minutes to cook with pork, orchard fruits, and condiments, cooking a glazed pork chop with a fig and apple salad. The judges were impressed with the flavours of the pork chop and the crackling garnish, winning him the second spot in Thursday's immunity challenge.	487,000	#8
43/09-4	Wednesday, 5 July 2023	Cactus Country Invention Test — The contestants except for Rhiannon (who was unwell) were taken to Cactus Country in Strathmerton, where Cath and Declan competed for the last spot in Thursday's immunity challenge. They were given 60 minutes to cook a dish featuring Mexican cuisine. Cath cooked Mexican chicken wings with a salsa and avocado cream, while Declan cooked grilled flathead with tortillas and a tatemada salsa. The judges deemed Declan's dish to have the better use of Mexican flavours, winning him the third and last spot in Thursday's immunity challenge. The judges then announced that Brent, Declan, and Theo would be given the chance to cook for an advantage in that challenge. They were given 60 minutes to cook a dish featuring cactus. Declan cooked steamed kingfish with a Mexican rice and a prickly pear tatemada salsa, which impressed the judges with its flavours and technique. Theo cooked prickly pear glazed pork tacos, which was criticised for not adequately featuring cactus. Brent cooked prickly pear glazed fried chicken with a strawberry cactus salsa, which impressed the judges its use of cactus and the glaze; it was deemed to be the best of the day, winning him an advantage in Thursday's immunity challenge.	401,000	#13
44/09-5	Thursday, 6 July 2023	Murtoa Stick Shed Immunity Service Challenge — The contestants were taken into the Stick Shed in Murtoa, where Brent, Theo and Declan competed for the final immunity of the season. For this service challenge, each was assigned a course which required them to feature a specific grain. Brent, as winner of the advantage in the previous cook, chose to use green lentils for his entrée of Sri Lankan dhal with smoked rainbow trout. This was followed with Theo's main dish of chickpea stew with lamb shanks. Ending the 3-course meal was Declan's dessert of pearl barley coconut pudding with peach and plum salsa. All three dishes wowed the judges, with Theo bringing forth his best dish of the competition so far. However, Declan's pearl barley coconut pudding was declared dish of the day, winning Declan the final immunity of the season and making him the first contestant to advance to Finals Week.	368,000	#12
Week 10 (Finals Week)
45/10-1	Sunday, 9 July 2023	Anchovies & Dijon Mustard Duel Elimination Challenge — The contestants aside from Declan faced a two-round challenge. In the first round, the contestants were paired up and competed against their partner. Each pair was given 75 minutes to cook a dish featuring either anchovies (Brent and Rhiannon) or Dijon mustard (Cath and Theo), with the winner out of each pair earning a spot in Finals Week. Brent cooked lobster and anchovy pasta, which was criticised for the flawed pasta, as it was not dried during the cook, and for not featuring enough anchovies, therefore missing the brief. Rhiannon cooked hibachi-grilled chicken with an anchovy salsa, which was praised for featuring anchovy flavours throughout the dish. Cath cooked a Djion glazed grilled trout with a potato and fennel salad. While the cooking of the fish received praise, the dish was criticised for lacking overall balance and the sauce lacked the flavours of Dijon mustard, therefore missing the brief. Theo cooked a pan-seared kingfish with a Dijon sauce and dill oil, which was praised for featuring Dijon mustard flavours throughout the dish, and for the dill oil. The judges declared Rhiannon and Theo the winners of their duels, earning them a spot in Finals Week. In the second round, Brent and Cath were given 75 minutes to cook a dish without any rules. Brent cooked a chicken adobo skewer with a charred corn salsa, which impressed the judges and was declared faultless. Cath cooked a chocolate parfait with a wattle seed shortbread. During the final minutes in the cook, Cath accidentally placed her parfait aside in the fridge, rather than the freezer, resulting in a melted parfait. The judges decided that Cath's dish had too many flaws, resulting in her being the fourteenth contestant to be eliminated.	463,000	#9
46/10-2	Monday, 10 July 2023	Family Mystery Box Challenge — The final mystery box of the year contained letters and photos from the contestants' families, in addition to an envelope mentioning their favourite dish cooked by the contestants at home. Brent, Declan, Rhiannon, and Theo were given 75 minutes to give their take on pork belly satay, chili and prawn pasta, laksa, and peri-peri chicken respectively. During the cook, Declan decided to pivot towards making rice noodles and a broth instead of pasta, while Rhiannon ran out of time to make fresh noodles, and decided to use packet noodles instead. Despite this, the flavours from all four dishes impressed the judges. Brent's braised pork belly was declared dish of the day, winning him a spot in the semi-finals and securing his place in the Top 3, while Declan, Rhiannon, and Theo were sent to the pressure test.	568,000	#9
47/10-3	Tuesday, 11 July 2023	Pressure Test: Peter Gilmore's No Recipe XO Squid — Chef Peter Gilmore set the pressure test, which required Declan, Rhiannon, and Theo to re-create his XO squid with scallops and pipis in 2 hours and 15 minutes, without a recipe. The contestants except for Brent were taken to the Bennelong restaurant at the Sydney Opera House, where Peter Gilmore and his team gave them a demonstration on how to make the dish. The contestants then returned to the MasterChef kitchen, where they had to re-create his dish from memory. Declan's re-creation was deemed to be almost perfect and although Rhiannon's XO sauce split, causing the texture of the dish to become oily, the flavours in her dish and the cooking on the seafood impressed the judges. Theo struggled to remove the membrane from the squid, requiring assistance from Declan, and as a result, lost cooking time, causing his seafood to be undercooked, and his flavours to be flawed. The judges decided that Theo's re-creation had too many flaws, resulting in him being the fifteenth contestant to be eliminated.	547,000	#6
48/10-4	Wednesday, 12 July 2023	Keeping Up with Curtis Stone Challenge — The semi-finalists competed in a challenge where they had to keep up with Curtis Stone and replicate his scotch fillet au poivre with a beurre rouge, pureed potatoes, and roasted bone marrow, with the winner of the challenge gaining a 30-minute head start in the semi-finals. During the cook, Brent burnt one side of his steak, resulting in it being caramelised unevenly. Declan trimmed too much fat off the scotch fillet, which affected the flavour and texture of the steak. In addition, Declan added the shallots in his onion jam late, resulting in undercooked jam. Rhiannon's potatoes were cut too large, which resulted in a grainy potato puree. The judges declared that Brent's re-creation was closest to the original, winning him the 30-minute head start in the semi-finals.	455,000	#13
49/10-5	Thursday, 13 July 2023	Semi-Finals: Service Challenge — Brent, Declan, and Rhiannon competed in the semi-final service challenge, cooking a three-course meal for 20 guests and the three judges, with Shannon Bennett mentoring and supporting the semi-finalists. Brent, who had won a 30-minute head start, was given 4 hours and 30 hours to cook, while Declan and Rhiannon were given 4 hours. For entrées, Brent served a charred octopus skewer with XO sauce and pickled daikon, which was praised for its flavour and for the cooking of the octopus. Rhiannon served betel leaf scallops with a Thai green gel, which impressed the judges with its flavours, and was declared the best entrée dish. Declan served scampi toast with a chili mayonnaise, which was criticised for its texture. For mains, Brent served roasted pork belly with a charred corn salsa, which impressed the judges with its flavours and the cooking of the pork, and was declared the best main course dish. Rhiannon served beef short rib with an apple salad and crispy potatoes, which received praise for the cooking of the beef, but the sauce was criticised for featuring too much spice. Declan served grilled blue eye trevalla with a green curry, which received praise for the cooking of the fish, but the sauce was criticised as being "lifeless", as it had been cooked for too long. For desserts, Brent served coconut ice cream with pickled mangoes and a tapioca pearl syrup, which received praise for the texture of the ice cream, but the dish was deemed to be slightly sugary. Rhiannon served lemongrass panna cotta with a finger lime syrup, which impressed the judges for featuring North Queensland flavours. Declan served a Paris-Brest with a pandan custard and tamarind caramel, which received praise for the cooking of the choux buns, but the custard was criticised for its chalky texture. Declan, who had served three flawed dishes, was eliminated, finishing in third place, while Brent and Rhiannon advanced to the grand finale.	449,000	#8
Grand Finale
50/11-1	Sunday, 16 July 2023	Grand Finale — Brent and Rhiannon competed in a two-round challenge, with the first round consisting of a choice between three challenges and the second round consisting of a pressure test. In the first round, the finalists were presented with the choice between a mystery box, an envelope containing a brief, or a cloche containing an ingredient to be featured. The finalists were given the opportunity to remove one challenge each, in which Brent removed the cloche, while Rhiannon removed the mystery box. Therefore, Brent and Rhiannon were given 75 minutes to cook a dish meeting the brief of telling a story. Brent, who took inspiration from his first dish on MasterChef, cooked a tamarind-glazed pork chop with charred cabbage and a salsa, impressing the judges, and scoring 29 points. Rhiannon, who took inspiration from her experiences with cooking with her family, cooked crispy pork belly with a citrus caramel and an Asian salad. While the judges liked the flavours of the dish, it was criticised for not featuring enough sauce, scoring 25 points. In the second round, pastry chef Amaury Guichon set the pressure test, presenting his intricate pocket watch dessert. Brent and Rhiannon were given 5 hours and 45 minutes to re-create Amaury's pocket watch, which consisted of a cake containing a double chocolate chip cookie base, coffee hazelnut financier, vanilla bean coffee caramel, coffee cremeux, and a chocolate mousse, in addition to a sugar dome. During the challenge, Brent reduced his sugar dome for too long, which resulted in it slightly deflating, while Rhiannon dipped her cake in chocolate first rather than glazing it, which resulted in it being coated in chocolate twice. Although Rhiannon's re-creation impressed the judges on its flavours, her mistake of dipping the cake in chocolate twice affected its texture. While Brent's sugar dome was flawed, his re-creation impressed the judges.	614,000	#5
50/11-1	Sunday, 16 July 2023	Winner Announced — For the second round, Brent scored 34 compared to Rhiannon's 27 points, with Brent scoring a combined 63 points compared to Rhiannon's 52 points. Brent Draper was announced as the winner of the fifteenth season of MasterChef Australia, receiving the first prize of $250,000 and being the third returning contestant to win the competition. Rhiannon Anderson received $40,000 as the runner-up, while Declan Cleary received $10,000 for finishing in third place. A tribute to Jock Zonfrillo was played, with clips of him from his time as a MasterChef Australia judge.	698,000	#3
