= Celebrity MasterChef Tamil =

Tamil TV show

- Genre: Cooking; Game show
- Presented by: Samantha Ruth Prabhu; Rj Vijay
- Judges: Chef Venkatesh Bhat; Sashi Cheliah; Shreeya Adka
- Country of origin: India
- Original language: Tamil

Production
- Production locations: Chennai, Tamil Nadu
- Running time: 60-70 minutes
- Production company: Banijay Asia

Original release
- Network: Sony Vizha
- Release: 19 October 2026 – present

Celebrity MasterChef is an Indian Tamil-language competitive cooking game show and the spin-off of the series MasterChef India – Tamil, featuring Tamil Television celebrity contestants, hosted by Samantha Ruth Prabhu and Rj Vijay. Chef Shreeya Adka reprised their roles as judges from the original series, while Cooku with Comali fame Chef Venkatesh Bhat and MasterChef Australia series 10 winner Chef Sashi Cheliah joined as co-judge.

The show is produced by Banijay Asia and it premiered on Sony Vizha on 19 October 2026, and airs from Monday to Friday at 20:00 and streams digitally on SonyLIV.

== Hosts and judges ==
Starring	Season 1
Samantha Ruth Prabhu	Host & Judge
Chef Venkatesh Bhat	Judge
Sashi Cheliah	Judge
Shreeya Adka	Judge
Rj Vijay	Host

== Series synopsis ==
=== Season 1 ===
The first season of Celebrity MasterChef Tamil airs from 19 October 2026, and airs from Monday to Friday at 20:00 and streams digitally on SonyLIV. The show based on Celebrity MasterChef Australia and is part of Celebrity MasterChef (Indian TV series). Hosted by Samantha Ruth Prabhu, while professional chefs such as Chef Venkatesh Bhat, Sashi Cheliah and Shreeya Adka are the judges for this season.

=== Contestants ===
# No	Contestant	Notability	Status	Ref.
1	RJ Deepak	Radio Jockey		
2	Dheena	Actor, Comedian, Screenwriter		
3	Mathichiyam Bala	Playback Singer		
4	Reshmi Menon	Actress		
5	Janani Ashok Kumar	Television Actress		
6	Shiyara Sharmi	Television Actress		
7	Abhi	Actress		
8	Siddhartha Shankar	Actor, Producer		
9	Vinodhini Vaidyanathan	Actress	Eliminated; 20 November	
10	Ravi Mariya	Actor, Writer, Director	Eliminated; 20 November	
11	Balaji Murugadoss	Actor, Model	Eliminated; 9 November	
12	Maria Juliana	Reality show alumnus	Eliminated; 30 October	

== Production ==
=== Development ===
In August 2026, Sony Pictures Networks India announced MasterChef India – Tamil, a spin-off featuring celebrities as contestants. Chef Venkatesh Bhat, Sashi Cheliah and Shreeya Adka as the judging panel along with them, actress Samantha Ruth Prabhu joined the Celebrity judging panel. Rj Vijay joined as co-host. The series is produced by Banijay Asia and it premiered on Sony Vizha television channel and it is currently streaming on SonyLIV and Amazon Prime Video.
