= Siddhartha Shankar =

Indian actor

- Born: 14 June 1994 (age 32); Petaling Jaya, Selangor, Malaysia
- Occupation: Actor
- Years active: 2016–present

Siddhartha Shankar (born 14 June 1994) is an Malaysian–Indian actor who works prominently in Tamil films. He is known for playing one of the lead roles in the films Saithan (2016), Kolai (2023) and Param Sundari (2025).

== Career ==
Siddhartha made his debut in the film Saithan (2016) which starred Vijay Antony which earned him a fair bit of recognition. He later went on to appear in the film Sathya (2017) playing a supporting role in the film. In 2025, Siddhartha made his big breakthrough in his career with the film Param Sundari which also marked his Hindi film debut. In 2026, he participated in the celebrity version of the reality cooking show MasterChef India – Tamil.

== Filmography ==
=== Film ===
- All films are in Tamil, unless otherwise noted.

Key
†	Denotes films that have not yet been released

Year	Title	Role	Notes
2016	Saithan	Thomas	
2017	Sathya	Gowtham	
2019	Kadaram Kondan	Nandha	
2022	Achcham Madam Naanam Payirppu	Harish	
2022	Ayngaran	Moorthy	
2023	Kolai	Sathish	
2025	Nilavuku En Mel Ennadi Kobam	Arvindh Siddarth	
2025	Param Sundari	Venu Nair	Hindi debut
2025	Madharaasi	PC 2	

=== Television ===
Year	Title	Role	Network	Notes
2019	Fingertip	Varun	Zee5	Web series
2026-present	Celebrity MasterChef Tamil	Contestant	Sony Vizha	
