= Brent Draper =

Australian cook and television presenter

- Born: 2 May 1989 (age 37); Beaudesert, Queensland, Australia
- Occupations: Television cook, digital content creator
- Years active: 2021–present
- Known for: Winning MasterChef Australia
- Predecessor: Billie McKay
- Successor: Nat Thaipun
- Spouse: Shonleigh Draper (m. 2016)
- Children: 1
- Website: www.brentdraper.com.au

Brent Draper (born 2 May 1989) is an Australian television cook and digital content creator who came to prominence as the winner of the fifteenth series of MasterChef Australia.

== Early life ==
Draper was born on 2 May 1989 in Beaudesert, Queensland. His father worked in the meat industry. After working in concrete pumping, Draper trained as a boilermaker.

== MasterChef ==
Draper was selected to compete in series 13 of MasterChef Australia in 2021. After reaching the Top 13, he withdrew from the competition on 13 June, citing mental health issues. In 2023, having received help and support, Draper rejoined MasterChef for series 15. He went on to win the competition on 16 July, receiving a cash prize of $250,000. MasterChef judge, Jock Zonfrillo, who supported Draper through his mental health issues, died between the filming and the broadcasting of the series.

== Personal life ==
Draper met his wife-to-be Shonleigh in 2011; they married in 2016 and have one son, born in 2018.

Preceded by Billie McKay	MasterChef Australia; Winner	Succeeded by Nat Thaipun
