= MasterChef Australia series 14 =

Season of television series

MasterChef Australia: Fans & Favourites
- Season 14
- Judges: Andy Allen; Melissa Leong; Jock Zonfrillo
- No. of contestants: 24
- Winner: Billie McKay
- Runner-up: Sarah Todd
- No. of episodes: 62

Release
- Original network: Network 10
- Original release: 18 April – 12 July 2022

Additional information
- Filming dates: December 2021

Series chronology
- ← Previous; Series 13 Next → Series 15

The fourteenth series of the Australian cooking game show MasterChef Australia premiered on 18 April 2022 on Network 10. The format for this season was Fans & Favourites, and featured 12 new contestants and 12 former contestants. Andy Allen, Melissa Leong, and Jock Zonfrillo returned to the show as judges from the previous season.

In October 2021, Ten announced that MasterChef Australia would return for its 14th season in 2022, initially announced as Foodies Vs. Favourites. In January 2022, production was temporarily halted after several members of the cast and production team tested positive for COVID-19. The judges, cast and crew were all fully vaccinated against the virus.

This series was won by Billie McKay in the grand finale against Sarah Todd, on 12 July 2022, making her the first and only two-time MasterChef Australia champion.

== Changes ==
This season omitted the broadcast of the audition stage for the new contestants and started with the 24 contestants competing in an Immunity Pin Challenge. Like the previous season, the holders of an Immunity Pin were able to use them at any point during future Elimination Challenges. The series featured more Immunity Pins handed out than any previous series, with seven being handed out in total. Christina, Harry, Tommy, Billie, Michael, Sarah and Julie were the winners of the seven pins at various points during the season.

Initially, instead of randomly chosen teams most team challenges at the beginning of the season featured contestants competing as members of either the Fans (new contestants) or Favourites (returning contestants) teams. This continued until week 6 when the two teams were dissolved.

This season, the typical MasterChef weekly format was slightly changed. Mondays now feature a Mystery Box with the bottom entries facing Tuesday's Pressure Test elimination. Wednesdays feature a Team Challenge with the winning team competing in the Immunity Challenge on Thursday, in which one contestant will be granted immunity from the upcoming elimination. All the other contestants then head into the All-In Elimination Challenge on Sunday.

Like season 12, this season did not feature a "second chance" challenge for eliminated contestants to return to the show.

== Contestants ==
The 12 returning contestants were announced in a sneak peek on 23 March 2022. The full cast was announced on 3 April 2022.

Contestant	State/Terr	Occupation	Original Series	Previous Season Placing	Status
Billie McKay	NSW	Restaurant manager	Series 7	Winner	Winner 12 July
Sarah Todd	VIC	Chef & restaurateur	Series 6	9th	Runner-up 12 July
Daniel Lamble	NT	Firefighter	New Contestant		Third Place 11 July
Keyma Vásquez Montero	VIC	Stay-at-home mum	New Contestant		Eliminated 10 July
Julie Goodwin	NSW	Cook, author & radio/TV presenter	Series 1	Winner	Eliminated 5 July
Alvin Quah	NSW	Medical manager	Series 2	6th	Eliminated 3 July
Mindy Woods	NSW	Chef & restaurateur	Series 4	4th	Eliminated 28 June
Aldo Ortado	NSW	Restaurant manager	Series 10	13th	Eliminated 26 June
Montana Hughes	QLD	TikToker	New Contestant		Eliminated 21 June
Tommy Pham	NSW	Kindergarten teacher	Series 13	7th	Eliminated 19 June
Michael Weldon	VIC	Developmental chef & TV presenter	Series 3	2nd	Eliminated 12 June
Steph Woon	VIC	Banking analyst	New Contestant		Eliminated 7 June
Harry Tomlinson	VIC	Barista & coffee roaster	New Contestant		Eliminated 5 June
Matt Landmark	VIC	Secondary school teacher	New Contestant		Eliminated 31 May
Ali Stoner	VIC	Artist	New Contestant		Eliminated 29 May
Melanie Persson	WA	PhD student	New Contestant		Eliminated 24 May
Jenn Lee	QLD	Dentist	New Contestant		Eliminated 19 May
Minoli De Silva	NT	Chemical engineer	Series 13	10th	Eliminated 17 May
Sashi Cheliah	SA	Chef & restaurateur	Series 10	Winner	Eliminated 15 May
Christina Batista	NSW	Chef & restaurateur	Series 5	5th	Eliminated 10 May
John Carasig	VIC	Chef & restaurateur	Series 7	12th	Eliminated 8 May
Max Krapivsky	VIC	Osteopath	New Contestant		Eliminated 3 May
Dulan Hapuarachchi	VIC	Financial analyst	New Contestant		Eliminated 26 April
Chris Tran	VIC	Marketing advisor	New Contestant		Eliminated 24 April

Future appearances

- In Series 15 Sashi Cheliah appeared as a guest team captain for a service challenge. Julie Goodwin later appeared as a guest judge for an elimination challenge.
- In Series 16 Julie & Sashi along with Alvin Quah, Mindy Woods, Aldo Ortado, Michael Weldon, Steph Woon, Harry Tomlinson, Ali Stoner, Dulan Hapuarachchi and Chris Tran appeared as guests for the 1st service challenge.
- Sarah Todd appeared on Series 17 for her 3rd chance to win. She was eliminated on July 27 2025, finishing 6th and Julie also appeared on the same day as a guest judge.

== Guests ==
Week	Guest	Challenge
2	Adriano Zumbo	Pressure Test
2	Rosheen Kaul	MasterClass
2	Matt Stone	Immunity Challenge
3	Shannon Bennett	Service & Mystery Box Challenge
3	Reynold Poernomo	Pressure Test
3	Curtis Stone	Service & Immunity Challenge
4	Gareth Whitton	Pressure Test
4	Clare Smyth	Service Challenge
5	Alla Wolf-Tasker	Pressure Test
6	Maggie Beer	Mystery Box Challenge
6	Josh Niland	Pressure Test
7 (Mega Week)	Donny Toce	Pressure Test
7 (Mega Week)	Marco Pierre White	Immunity Challenge
7 (Mega Week)	Nick Riewoldt	MasterClass
7 (Mega Week)	Thi Le	MasterClass
8	Marco Pierre White	Elimination Challenge
8	Dave Pynt	Mystery Box Challenge
8	Andreas Papadakis	Pressure Test
9 (Top 10 Week)	Rick Stein	Elimination Challenge
10	Khanh Nguyen	Pressure Test
10	Natalie Paull	MasterClass
11	Hugh Allen	Elimination Challenge
11	Kirsten Tibballs	Pressure Test
13 (Grand Finale Week)	Peter Gilmore	Pressure Test
13 (Grand Finale Week)	Shannon Bennett	Service Challenge
13 (Grand Finale Week)	Heston Blumenthal	Grand Finale

== Elimination chart ==
No.	Week	1			2			3		4		5		6				7		8		9			10		11		Finals		Grand Finale	
No.	Mystery Box Challenge Winner	None			Aldo; Melanie			Ali; Julie; Sashi; Tommy		Minoli		Ali		Aldo; Daniel; Mindy				Tommy		Sarah		Billie			Billie; Julie		Daniel; Sarah		None		None	
No.	Immunity Challenge	Christina; Harry; Tommy		Chris; Harry; Julie; Montana	Aldo; Alvin; Billie; Julie; Melanie; Michael; Minoli			Michael; Sarah; Sashi; Tommy		Ali; Jenn; Montana		None		Sarah			Ali; Julie; Matt	Alvin; Harry; Keyma; Michael; Mindy; Montana; Tommy		Daniel; Montana; Sarah		Billie; Daniel; Julie; Mindy		Billie; Daniel; Julie; Mindy	Alvin; Julie; Keyma; Sarah		Alvin; Julie; Sarah		Julie; Keyma	Billie; Sarah	None	
No.	Elimination Challenge Winner	Minoli			None			Daniel		Melanie		Keyma; Melanie; Steph		None				Aldo; Alvin; Billie; Tommy		Aldo; Billie; Julie; Keyma; Sarah		Keyma; Sarah			Alvin; Mindy; Sarah		Daniel; Sarah		Daniel	Daniel	None	
1	Billie	IN		Team Win	IN	Team Win	I.P.	Team Lose 3	T.L./Imm.	IN	Team Lose	Top 5	Team 2nd	IN		Btm 3	Btm 4	IN	Top 4	Btm 4	Top 5	WIN		IMM	Top 2	Btm 2	Btm 3	Btm 3	Btm 3	IMM	Top 2	WINNER
2	Sarah	IN		Team Win	IN	Team Lose 1		Team Win 1	Team Lose	IN	Team Lose	Btm 2	Team Win	WIN	I.P.	IN	Btm 5/Imm.	IN	Btm 8	WIN	Top 5	IN		Top 2	Btm 4	Top 3	Top 2	Top 2	Btm 2	Btm 2	Top 2	Runner-up
3	Daniel	IN		Team Lose	IN	Team Lose 2		Team Win 2	WIN	Btm 4	Team Win	IN	Btm 4	IN		Top 3	Btm 4	Btm 4	Btm 2	IN	IMM	Top 2		IMM	Top 3	Btm 4	Top 2	Top 2	WIN	WIN	3rd	Eliminated (Ep 61)
4	Keyma	IN		Team Lose	IN	Team Lose 2		Team Win 2	Team Win	IN	Team Win	IN	Team Lose 1	IN		IN	Btm 14	Top 4	IMM	IN	Top 5	IN		Top 2	IN	IMM	IN	Btm 3	IMM	Elim	Eliminated (Ep 60)	
5	Julie	IN		IMM	Btm 3	Team Win		DNP	Btm 2	IN	Team Lose	Top 5	Team Win	IN		IN	IMM	IN	Btm 8	IN	Top 5	WIN	I.P.	IMM	Top 2	Btm 3/Imm.	Btm 2	IMM	Elim	Eliminated (Ep 57)		
6	Alvin	IN		Team Win	Btm 4	Team Win		Btm 2	DNP	IN	Team Lose	Btm 5	Team 2nd	IN		IN	Btm 14	Top 4	Top 4	Btm 4	Btm 5	IN		Btm 2	IN	Top 3	IN	Elim	Eliminated (Ep 55)			
7	Mindy	IN		Team Win	IN	Team Lose 3		Team Lose 2	Team Lose	IN	Btm 2	IN	Team Win	IN		Top 3	Btm 14	IN	Btm 8	IN	Btm 5	Top 2		IMM	Btm 3	Top 3	Elim	Eliminated (Ep 52)				
8	Aldo	IN		Team Win	Top 2	Fast Track		Team Win 1	Team Lose	IN	DNP	Top 2	Team 2nd	IN		Top 3	Btm 14	Top 4	Top 4	IN	Top 5	IN		Btm 4	Btm 2	Elim	Eliminated (Ep 50)					
9	Montana	IN		Team Lose	IN	Team Lose 3		Team Win 3	Team Win	IN	Team Win	IN	Btm 6	IN		IN	Btm 14	Btm 2	Btm 8	Btm 4	Btm 2	IN		Btm 4	Elim	Eliminated (Ep 47)						
10	Tommy	Top 3	I.P.	Team Win	IN	Team Lose 1		DNP	T.L./Imm.	Btm 2	DNP		Btm 2	IN		IN	Btm 14	WIN	Top 4	IN	Btm 5	IN		Elim	Eliminated (Ep 45)							
11	Michael	IN		Team Win	IN	Team Win	I.P.	Team Win 1	IMM	IN	T.L./Imm.	IN	Team Win	IN		IN	Btm 14	Btm 3	Btm 8	IN	Elim	Eliminated (Ep 40)										
12	Steph	IN		Team Lose	IN	Team Lose 3		Team Win 3	Team Win	IN	Team Win	IN	Team Lose 1	IN		IN	Btm 14	IN	Btm 8	Elim	Eliminated (Ep 37)											
13	Harry	Top 3	I.P.	Btm 2	IN	Team Lose 3		Team Win 2	Team Win	IN	Team Win	Btm 4/Imm.	Btm 4	IN		Btm 2	Btm 14	IN	Elim	Eliminated (Ep 35)												
14	Matt	IN		Team Lose	IN	Team Lose 2		Btm 5	Team Win	Btm 4	Team Win	Top 5	Btm 6	IN		Btm 4	Btm 4	Elim	Eliminated (Ep 32)													
15	Ali	IN		Team Lose	IN	Team Lose 3		Team Lose 1	Team Win	IN	IMM	WIN	Team 2nd	IN		IN	Elim	Eliminated (Ep 30)														
16	Melanie	IN		DNP	Top 2	Fast Track		Team Win 3	Team Win	IN	WIN	IN	Team Lose 2	IN		Elim	Eliminated (Ep 27)															
17	Jenn	IN		Team Lose	IN	Team Lose 2		Btm 4	Team Win	IN	Team Win	Btm 3	Elim	Eliminated (Ep 24)																		
18	Minoli	IN		WIN	IN	Team Win		Team Lose 2	Team Lose	WIN	Team Lose	Elim	Eliminated (Ep 22)																			
19	Sashi	IN		Team Win	IN	Team Lose 1		Team Lose 2	Team Lose	IN	Elim	Eliminated (Ep 20)																				
20	Christina	Top 3	I.P.	Team Win	IN	Team Lose 1		Team Win 1	DNP/Imm.	Elim	Eliminated (Ep 17)																					
21	John	IN		Team Win	IN	Team Lose 1		Btm 4	Elim	Eliminated (Ep 15)																						
22	Max	IN		Btm 3	Btm 2	Team Lose 2		Elim	Eliminated (Ep 12)																							
23	Dulan	IN		Team Lose	Elim	Eliminated (Ep 7)																										
24	Chris	IN		Elim	Eliminated (Ep 5)																											
	Eliminated	None		Chris	Dulan	None		Max	John	Christina	Sashi	Minoli	Jenn	None		Melanie	Ali	Matt	Harry	Steph	Michael	Tommy			Montana	Aldo	Mindy	Alvin	Julie	Keyma	Daniel	Sarah; 56 points
	Eliminated	None		Chris	Dulan	None		Max	John	Christina	Sashi	Minoli	Jenn	None		Melanie	Ali	Matt	Harry	Steph	Michael	Tommy			Montana	Aldo	Mindy	Alvin	Julie	Keyma	Daniel	Billie; 58 points (win)

== Episodes and ratings ==
Colour key:
– Highest rating during the series
– Lowest rating during the series

Ep#/Wk-Ep#	Original airdate	Episode Title / Event	Total viewers (five metro cities)	Nightly Ranking
Week 1
1/01-1	Monday, 18 April 2022	Series Premiere: Strengths Immunity Pin Challenge — The 24 contestants were tasked with cooking a dish which showcased their strengths for one of three immunity pins. The contestants competed in their teams, as Fans or Favourites. The contestant who cooked the top dish in each team received an immunity pin, as well as the contestant who cooked the next best dish in either team. Harry's burnt cabbage and Tommy's bún mắm were declared the best dishes from the Fans and the Favourites respectively, thus winning the first two pins. The third and final pin was granted to Christina, whose bacalhau à brás was deemed the next best dish.	545,000	#9
2/01-2	Tuesday, 19 April 2022	Featured Ingredients Service Challenge — The contestants competed in their Fans and Favourites teams in a three-course service challenge, in which each course had to feature a key ingredient chosen by the Fans or the Favourites. Teams were broken up into three smaller sections of four people who worked on each course; the sections who cooked each of the winning courses will enter the immunity decider challenge. The Fans had the best entree and dessert, while the Favorites had the winning main. Fans Harry, Max, Jenn, Chris, Melanie, Montana, Steph and Keyma and Favourites Sashi, Tommy, Julie and Michael advanced to the next challenge.	436,000	#12
3/01-3	Wednesday, 20 April 2022	Food Pyramid Invention Test — The 12 winning contestants from the service challenge were given 75 minutes to cook a dish using one or more layers of the food pyramid. Steph, Sashi and Chris had access to the entire pyramid, while Melanie, Julie and Jenn cooked using the bottom three rows. Keyma, Tommy, and Harry had the bottom two rows, and Montana, Michael and Max were limited to the bottom row, consisting of fruits, vegetables and legumes. Montana, Harry, Julie and Chris' dishes were deemed the best in their respective categories, and they earned the four spots in the immunity challenge.	376,000	#15
4/01-4	Thursday, 21 April 2022	Lucky Dip Immunity Challenge — Chris, Harry, Montana and Julie each chose one cloche blindly from four rows containing fruits and vegetables, herbs and spices, pantry items, and cooking techniques. They had 75 minutes to cook a dish featuring leeks, anchovies, saffron and a deep-fried element. The judges liked Harry's gnocco fritto with ricotta and leeks, but they loved Julie's prawn, leek and chorizo paella, and she won immunity from elimination.	490,000	#9
Week 2
5/02-1	Sunday, 24 April 2022	Great Aussie Jaffle Elimination - In the first of a two-round elimination challenge, all contestants except Julie (who had immunity) and Melanie (who sat out to balance the team numbers) had 45 minutes to cook a dish using a jaffle maker. Minoli's chicken and potato jaffle was considered the best and the Favourites were saved from elimination, sending the Fans into the second round, where they had 75 minutes to make a dish that had changed their lives. Harry, who decided not to play her immunity pin, had multiple issues with her dish as her pumpkin was under-seasoned and her lentils were under-cooked. Max's tart was also under-cooked. Chris struggled during the cook as he burned the first batch of crispy noodles for his dish and forgot to clean the oil before cooking his second batch. Ultimately, the burnt oil overpowered the flavour of the dish, which resulted in his elimination.	442,000	#5
6/02-2	Monday, 25 April 2022	Throwback Mystery Box — The contestants were given 75 minutes to cook a dish using the first mystery box from the first series, containing ingredients such as a pork chop, Granny Smith apples and dark chocolate, as well the pantry staples. Aldo's pork cotoletta Milanese and Melanie's gluten-free choux lemon meringue were the top two, fast-tracking them to the immunity challenge. Julie's noodles for her fettucine dish were rolled too thin and overcooked, and Alvin's noodles were under-cooked. Dulan's pork chop was overcooked, while Max's agnolotti was under-seasoned and bland. The four were sent to the pressure test as a result.	438,000	#14
7/02-3	Tuesday, 26 April 2022	Adriano Zumbo Pressure Test — Alvin, Julie, Dulan and Max faced a pressure test set by pastry chef Adriano Zumbo. They had four hours and thirty minutes to recreate his chocolate dessert Polly Want a Waffle, with the chocolate feathers already prepared for them. Julie's and Alvin's desserts were near-perfect, with the latter's dish being the dish of the day, and they were safe, putting Max and Dulan in the bottom two. Max's waffle layers were set well, but his marshmallow was problematic. Dulan, who struggled and fell behind early in the cook, rushed to make his layers and his dish was unbalanced, which sealed his elimination.	498,000	#10
8/02-4	Wednesday, 27 April 2022	Chili Team Relay — With Aldo and Melanie fast-tracked to the immunity challenge, the 20 remaining contestants were divided into four teams of five and asked to cook a dish featuring chillies, given 15 minutes each to cook and 45 seconds to transfer information to the next cook. Since the Favourites have one extra cook, Mindy joined the Fans to balance the team members. John and Julie, the captains of the Red and Grey Teams, respectively, decided to make curries. Harry, who captained the Green Team, selected chicken wings, and Matt, leading the Purple Team, opted for tacos. The Red Team's Sri Lankan chicken curry was praised, but their chilli jam was over-reduced and over-caramelised. The Purple Team struggled from poor communication as Max, the last cook on the team, scrapped the tacos and chose to serve a steak with a chilli salsa, which was criticised for being a jumble of flavours. Overall, the Grey Team's Thai chicken curry beat the Green Team's sweet chilli chicken wings, earning them the chance to compete for immunity alongside Aldo and Melanie.	443,000	#14
8/02-5	Wednesday, 27 April 2022	MasterClass: Jock Zonfrillo, Andy Allen, Rosheen Kaul, Julie Goodwin and Jenn Lee- Jock and Andy each cooked a dish using Monday's mystery box, while guest chef Rosheen Kaul presented her wood-fired mackerel with charred tomato sambal. Julie and Jenn then demonstrated their favorite fried chicken recipes.	369,000	#17
9/02-6	Thursday, 28 April 2022	Beat the Chef Immunity Challenge — Aldo, Alvin, Michael, Billie, Julie, Minoli and Melanie competed against guest chef Matt Stone for one of seven immunity pins. They had 75 minutes to cook a dish highlighting one of the following controversial ingredients: licorice, blue cheese, Brussels sprouts, coriander, oysters, and pineapple. Matt's grilled oyster dish earned 26 out of 30 points. Billie and Michael impressed the judges, receiving 27 and 29 points for their coriander panna cotta, and pineapple and ham broth, respectively, and they each won a pin.	510,000	#8
Week 3
10/03-1	Sunday, 1 May 2022	Shannon Bennett French Service Challenge — The judges announced that, instead of an elimination, contestants would compete in a service challenge set by guest chef Shannon Bennett. Each team needed to cook a French entree, main and dessert for 20 diners plus the judges, with the least impressive course cooks having to cook in mystery box challenge. They were given two hours to prepare their elements. Tommy was ill and did not compete; Julie sat out to balance the teams. According to the judges, the Fans' entree was delicious but flawed in several minor ways, while the Favourites presented the best entree and a tasty main, but needed to improve their seasoning, and presented a dessert with technical issues. Thus, the Fans won on the latter two courses. Favourites Aldo, Christina, Sarah and Michael, and Fans Daniel, Harry, Keyma, Montana, Melanie and Steph were safe from elimination, sending the others, including Julie, to the mystery box challenge.	460,000	#7
11/03-2	Monday, 2 May 2022	Shannon Bennett Mystery Box — Tommy and the 10 losing contestants in the service challenge had 75 minutes to cook a dish using a mystery box assembled by Shannon Bennett, featuring ingredients such as sweetbreads, turmeric, and spanner crab, with the bottom four facing elimination. Ali, Tommy, Sashi, and Julie received high praise for their dishes, however, Alvin's dish was full of flavour but his sweetbreads were overcooked, while Jenn's turmeric pawpaw parfait was smooth, her flavour balanced got a little bit rocky, and John's ajoblanco was overpowered by sweet elements. Following the disappointing reception to his dish, John suffered an emotional meltdown, and was consoled by Melissa. In a close decision between Max and Matt, the judges chose to send Max to the Pressure Test with Alvin, John and Jenn, due to a piece of crab shell in his dish.	466,000	#15
12/03-3	Tuesday, 3 May 2022	Reynold Poernomo Pressure Test - Former contestant Reynold Poernomo challenged Alvin, Jenn, John and Max to replicate his new signature dish, Noi. John and Jenn, whose chocolate twigs were too thick, impressed the judges with their dishes, putting Alvin and Max in the bottom two. Alvin's dessert lacked in presentation, but it tasted better than it looked. Max, however, had multiple errors in his dish. His jasmine mousse lacked tea leaf flavour, his green apple sorbet was malformed and lacked caramelisation, and his muscovado tuiles were too soft. Those errors were enough to eliminate him.	451,000	#11
13/03-4	Wednesday, 4 May 2022	Curtis Stone Service Challenge - Fast and Fancy — Guest judge Curtis Stone returned for another service challenge. Minoli sat out due to illness and Billie joined the Fans to balance the team numbers. Each team was then split into groups of five and given two hours and thirty minutes to serve 80 diners, with one group from either side cooking two fast food dishes, and the other cooking one fancy dish. The Fans were to hero pork, while the Favourites were assigned chicken. The Favourites' outperformed the Fans in both the challenges, with their Chicken shawarma and Korean fried wings being deemed the best fast food dishes, and their rendang roasted chicken being declared the better fine dining dish. As a result, the Favourites, aside from Billie and Minoli, advanced to the Immunity Challenge.	399,000	#14
14/03-5	Thursday, 5 May 2022	Curtis Stone Immunity Challenge - Ingredients or Time - Alvin, John, Mindy, Julie, Sarah, Aldo, Michael, Sashi, Christina and Tommy had up to one hour to cook a dish using up to 10 sets of ingredients, with each set becoming available every three minutes. They also had to incorporate Curtis's chosen ingredient, apples. Tommy, Sarah and John were the first to start, making apple desserts in 57 minutes. Alvin made apple and butterscotch in 54 minutes. Christina had 51 minutes to cook with pork. Mindy had 45 minutes to cook with the addition of root vegetables and aromatics. Sashi had 39 minutes to cook a pork and apple red curry with parsnip chips. Aldo cooked chiacchiere in 33 minutes. Julie and Michael started as the final set of ingredients was made available, having only 30 minutes. Sarah, Tommy, Sashi and Michael were declared the Top 4, but Michael's apple and scallop ceviche was praised for its exceptional balance, and he was awarded weekly immunity.	480,000	#9
Week 4
15/04-1	Sunday, 8 May 2022	Egg Elimination — Michael had weekly immunity, and Alvin and Christina sat out the first round to balance the teams. The other contestants faced a two-round elimination challenge featuring eggs. In round one, they had 30 minutes to cook a dish using a single egg, with only the top three dishes from each team being tasted. Minoli's rice was undercooked and John's egg was rubbery, leaving Aldo, Steph, Ali, and Daniel's dishes being deemed the Top 4. Daniel's crab omelette with chilli butter was declared the winning dish, saving the Fans from elimination. In round two, the Favourites (except Michael) were given one hour to cook another dish with at least one of eleven eggs. Not feeling confident about her chances, Billie played her pin at the beginning of the cook, while Christina and Tommy played their pins towards the end, feeling dissatisfied with their dishes. Most of the contestants impressed the judges, especially Aldo's filoscio, Minoli's egg pan rolls, Alvin's Nyonya egg curry, Mindy's Chinese omelette, and Sashi's egg sambal. Landing in the bottom two were Julie, whose fried rice was tasty but greasy, and John, whose lemon tart contained too much pastry, as well as an overcooked lemon curd. Additionally, he was unable to whip up his meringue and was forced to replace it with cream. Due to the flaws in his egg elements, the judges felt that John had missed the brief and he was the first Favourite to be eliminated.	452,000	#7
16/04-2	Monday, 9 May 2022	Alphabet Mystery Box — The contestants had to each choose a letter of the alphabet revealing a mystery ingredient starting with that letter. Then they had 60 minutes to cook a dish using that ingredient. Minoli's curry leaf-cured kingfish was the dish of the day, earning the Favourites an advantage later in the week. However, Tommy's macadamia puree was grainy in texture, while Christina's burrata was too dry and her fig jam was too heavy. Daniel was criticised by the judges for not featuring kale in his ricotta and kale turnovers, and Matt undercooked the pastry for his tahini mille-feuille. As a result, the latter four ended up in elimination.	532,000	#11
17/04-3	Tuesday, 10 May 2022	Tarts Anon Pressure Test — Chef Gareth Whitton set the pressure test, which required Christina, Tommy, Daniel and Matt to recreate his smoked pecan and butterscotch tart in two hours and fifty minutes, along with an accompanying element of their choosing. Daniel's and Matt's desserts were considered the best, saving them from elimination. The judges agreed that the cook overwhelmed both Tommy and Christina, and both of their dishes had significant problems. However, Tommy's dessert was deemed better than Christina's because her tart was in the oven too late and with 40 minutes to go, it didn't cook through, which made the flavours out of balance. Because the tart was the foundation of Gareth's dish, the judges felt that Christina had missed the brief, and she was eliminated.	504,000	#9
18/04-4	Wednesday, 11 May 2022	Clare Smyth Service Challenge — The contestants except Sarah, who sat out to balance the teams, faced a service challenge set by Michelin-starred chef Clare Smyth. The teams were split into groups of three and given two hours to cook a three-course meal highlighting one core ingredient, honey for the Fans and cherries for the Favourites. The Favourites won on the main course, but the Fans won on the entree and dessert, and they earned the right to compete for immunity.	510,000	#12
19/04-5	Thursday, 12 May 2022	Random Ingredient Immunity Challenge — Ali, Daniel, Matt, Keyma, Harry, Melanie, Jenn, Montana and Steph competed in a two-round immunity challenge. In round one, they had 60 minutes to cook a dish using either tea, milk or cinnamon. Ali, Jenn and Montana, who had the best tea, milk and cinnamon desserts respectively, advanced to round two, where they had 60 minutes to make another dish incorporating one ingredient chosen blindly from three, which was white nectarines. Ali, who initially disliked the choice of ingredient, impressed the judges with her nectarine and squid noodles with daikon. She narrowly beat Montana's nectarine and basil sorbet to win Weekly Immunity, sending the others to the elimination.	505,000	#8
Week 5
20/05-1	Sunday, 15 May 2022	Time Elimination Challenge — Ali had weekly immunity, while Aldo sat out the first round to balance the teams. The remaining contestants had to cook a ten-minute dish. Melanie's silken tofu with fried egg was considered the best, saving the Fans from elimination. The Favourites then faced a two-day elimination cook-off, where they were given 45 minutes to prepare a dish of their choice, then 60 minutes to cook it the next day. Michael, whose beef brisket became tough and dry, played his pin minutes into the cook. Most of the Favourites' dishes were praised by the judges, with Minoli's pork belly curry with chana dal curry and chili pineapple, Alvin's tofu, Billie's confit duck leg, Julie's Moroccan lamb shoulder with couscous, Sarah's pork vindaloo and Aldo's octopus and octopus broth, leaving Mindy and Sashi in jeopardy. Mindy's dumplings were raw, but her broth was deep and rich in flavour. Sashi, who had to remake the dosas for his overnight fish curry, mistakenly left his curry to cook on the stove at high heat, burning on the bottom of the pot and the burnt flavour overpowered the entire dish, and Sashi was eliminated. Tommy, who was absent isolating, must compete in the first elimination challenge after his return.	477,000	#6
21/05-2	Monday, 16 May 2022	Fitzroy Mills Mystery Box — The 18 remaining contestants were taken to the Fitzroy Mills Market in Melbourne for their next mystery box challenge, where they had 75 minutes to cook a dish highlighting coffee. The judges praised Aldo's panna cotta al caffe, but they were impressed by Ali's coffee-marinated eggplant with tofu latte, earning the Fans an advantage in the next team challenge. Billie, Matt and Julie received special mentions for their dishes. However, Jenn burnt the coffee for her pumpkin dish, and Harry overcooked the bacon for her breakfast sandwich and her toast was soggy, sending both of them through to the pressure test. Alvin's brownie missed the brief by failing to highlight coffee, Sarah's gulab jamun didn't have the right texture despite her well-received coffee syrup, and Minoli's coffee and berry dish was overpowered by her mixed berry compote. Minoli and Sarah were chosen to join Harry and Jenn in the pressure test.	535,000	#12
22/05-3	Tuesday, 17 May 2022	Pressure Test: Alla Wolf-Tasker's Summer Cucumbers with Murray Cod — Harry, Jenn, Minoli and Sarah traveled to Alla Wolf-Tasker's Lake House restaurant for a demonstration of her summer cucumbers and Murray cod dish. They then returned to the MasterChef kitchen, where they had 90 minutes to replicate the dish from memory. Harry, who struggled to properly cook her fish, played her immunity pin in the last few minutes of the cook, while Jenn was praised for her near replication. Sarah's vichyssoise was slightly watery, her dill fronds were missing, her fish was problematic, Melissa's fish was overcooked, and it was unpleasant to eat while Andy's fish had a bone in there. Minoli's vichyssoise was balanced and well executed, but her fish was overcooked, her dill oil tasted like a puree and she left numerous elements off the plate due to time constraints. Although Sarah's dish had too many flaws, the judges felt that Minoli had missed the brief and she was eliminated.	513,000	#9
23/05-4	Wednesday, 18 May 2022	Date Night Service Challenge — The contestants, aside from Tommy, competed in a delivery service challenge, where they were split into four teams of four to cook a three-course date night meal for 25 couples, with the bottom two teams facing an elimination challenge. The Purple Team, led by Aldo, had Ali's advantage of having Andy cook with them for 15 minutes. The Orange Team, led by Julie, impressed the judges with their retro South Asian menu, and they were safe. The Teal Team struggled under Daniel's leadership. They didn't have enough broccolini in their entree and the pulled pork was unseasoned and bland. The judges liked the Pink Team's meatball main, but they felt their entree and dessert were problematic. While the Purple Team's pizzaiola sauce was rushed and their cauliflower puree lacked cauliflower flavour, their sticky date pudding was judged as the dish of the day, saving them and sending the Pink Team to the elimination.	499,000	#13
24/05-5	Thursday, 19 May 2022	90-Minute Two-Round Elimination Challenge — Tommy and the Teal and Pink Teams faced a two-round elimination challenge, where they were given 90 minutes to split between the two rounds however they chose. Steph and Melanie impressed the judges with their dishes. Keyma, who used 60 minutes to make her Caribbean prawn curry, also impressed the judges. All three were declared safe, with Montana and Matt also scraping through to safety. Daniel, Harry, Jenn and Tommy were sent into the second round, where they had to cook another dish using whatever time they had left. Harry and Daniel redeemed themselves with their curried carrots and ocean spared ribs respectively, saving them. Both Tommy and Jenn had issues with their dishes. Jenn chose to meet the brief with the same dish as round 1 while Tommy chose to meet the brief with a dish from his heritage. However, his fish was overcooked and his broth was under-seasoned, despite the flavours of his fish and his delicious noodles. Jenn attempted to improve her mapo tofu dish. However, while her rice was improved, her mapo tofu was problematic. In the end, the judges felt that Jenn failed to meet the brief and she was eliminated.	508,000	#8
24/05-6	Thursday, 19 May 2022	MasterClass: Jock Zonfrillo, Andy Allen, Country Cob, Michael Weldon and Keyma Vasquez Montero - Jock and Andy each cooked a dish using ingredients in the MasterChef garden. Chan and Ryan from Country Cob Bakery baked their slow-cooked barbeque beef with quail egg and curried scallop pies. Michael and Keyma then went head-to-head making 30-minute desserts, and Keyma won with her lime churros with dulce de leche sauce.	313,000	#18
Week 6
25/06-1	Sunday, 22 May 2022	Two Cuisines Immunity Challenge — The judges announced that moving forward in the competition, the Fans' and Favorites' teams would be combined, and the format of competing in two separate groups would be done away with. The contestants were then given 75 minutes to cook a fusion dish combining two cuisines of their choosing. Several contestants impressed with their dishes, but the judges found Sarah's Indian and French inspired butter-poached lobster dish to be flawless and declared it to be head and shoulders above the other contestants' offerings. She won the immunity pin, along with $10,000.	447,000	#6
26/06-2	Monday, 23 May 2022	Maggie Beer's Mystery Box — The contestants had 75 minutes to cook a dish using Maggie Beer's mystery box, which featured ingredients such as guineafowl, chickpeas, eggplant and prunes, as well as her vino cotto and verjuice. The judges loved Mindy's roast eggplant salad, Daniel's roast guinea fowl, and Aldo's melanzane a scarpone. However, Harry's roast eggplant was under-seasoned and overpowered by her Vegemite, while Matt's chickpeas were undercooked, and his sauce was too sweet. Melanie's guineafowl Maryland was undercooked, and the skin was under-caramelized, and Billie's guineafowl breast with parsley butter was criticized. With those major errors, the latter four ended up in elimination.	523,000	#14
27/06-3	Tuesday, 24 May 2022	Pressure Test: Josh Niland's Tuna Wellington with Mashed Potato and Tuna Gravy — Billie, Harry, Matt and Melanie were given four hours to recreate Josh Niland's tuna wellington with mashed potato and tuna gravy. Billie and Matt, the latter of whom had the dish of the day, excelled during the cook and impressed the judges. The judges loved Harry's wellington and mashed potato, but her sauce was meaty and opaque. Melanie, who couldn't taste her dish, struggled. While her gravy was tasty, she forgot to weigh her tuna and the rest of her dish was affected as the pastry surrounded it was thicker and it was undercooked. Although Harry's tuna gravy was flawed, the judges felt that Melanie had missed the brief and despite her best effort, it was enough to eliminate her.	481,000	#9
28/06-4	Wednesday, 25 May 2022	Werribee Mansion Team Challenge — The 15 contestants were taken to Werribee Park Mansion for a team challenge, where they were given 2 hours and 30 minutes to prepare a two-course fine dining meal for 60 diners using ordinary ingredients. The Pink Team struggled under the ambitious task set for them by captain Sarah, and their dishes were poorly received. The judges liked the menu of Billie's Yellow Team, but they felt that the Orange Team, led by Michael, was more successful at meeting the brief, and they were granted the chance to cook for immunity.	486,000	#11
29/06-5	Thursday, 26 May 2022	Immunity Challenge: Air Fryer and Deep Fryer — In the first round of the immunity challenge, Ali, Julie, Matt, Michael and Mindy had 45 minutes to cook a dish using an air fryer. Ali's papri chat wowed the judges, and she advanced to round two, along with Matt and Julie, who also impressed the judges with their chicken wings and spanakopita respectively. The three were given 60 minutes to make a deep-fried dish. Ali's lobster tempura dish did not go according to plan, and was poorly received. The judges enjoyed Matt's fish and chips, but they loved Julie's Spanish bacon and corn croquettes, and she became the first contestant of the season to win Weekly Immunity twice.	513,000	#8
Week 7 (Mega Week)
30/07-1	Sunday, 29 May 2022	All-In Elimination: Greens & Herbs — The contestants aside from Julie faced a two-round elimination. In round one, they took turns identifying various greens and herbs on a wall, with the first five to guess incorrectly being sent to round two. Ali, Billie, Daniel, Matt and Sarah were the first five to guess incorrectly and were sent to the second round. In this round, they had 75 minutes to cook a dish highlighting the ingredients on the wall. Despite being happy with her dish, Sarah chose to use her Immunity Pin towards the end of the cook. Billie's curry leaf parfait, Matt's brassicas with tarragon and pistachio, and Daniel's braised kale with cucumber broth all earned praise from the judges. The judges liked Ali's green gnocchi, but her roasted fennel with cavolo nero sauce was heavy and her dish overall felt confusing. They felt that Ali missed the mark, and she was eliminated.	500,000	#6
31/07-2	Monday, 30 May 2022	Rainy Day Mystery Box — The 14 contestants had to cook their favourite rainy-day dish in 75 minutes, with the winner earning a fast-track to the immunity challenge. Aldo, Alvin and Keyma stood out with their dishes, but Tommy's bánh canh cua was considered the best, and he won the fast track. However, Matt's chicken jalfrezi was thrown out of balance by the lack of seasoning, Michael's chili con carne had a couple of minor flaws, Montana's Middle Eastern sweet chicken stew was criticised for not including bone-in chicken, and Daniel's prawn laksa wasn't balanced, sending the latter four straight to the pressure test.	555,000	#10
32/07-3	Tuesday, 31 May 2022	Pressure Test: Donato Toce's Honey — Donato Toce of Gelato Messina set a pressure test for Michael, Matt, Daniel and Montana. They were given three and a half hours to recreate Toce's Honey, composed of a honey tuille, a filled blown sugar beehive, and a honey gelato with financier. Daniel sailed through the challenge and created the blown sugar beehive with ease as all the others struggled. His dish impressed the judges and was declared dish of the day, with Donato remarking Daniel's gelato was even better than his own. Michael's dish received praise as well. Montana completed all the elements, but she was the only contestant who failed to produce a complete beehive but managed to plate her beehive element using broken sugar shards in a manner that resembled the original. Her dish also closely resembled Donato's in terms of taste, flavour and balance. Matt also completed all of the elements and his beehive element and his honey tuile were delicious, but there was a serious flaw in his gelato as he misread the recipe and its construction was more financier than gelato. Deciding between Montana and Matt, the judges felt that Matt had missed the brief and he was eliminated.	533,000	#9
33/07-4	Wednesday, 1 June 2022	Digital Art Gallery Team Challenge - For their next team challenge, the contestants were taken to the LUME Melbourne, where they were split into two teams of six and given two and a half hours to create a three-course menu inspired by Vincent van Gogh's forest painting. The judges liked the Yellow Team's dessert, but they preferred the Green Team's entree and main, and the latter joined Tommy in the immunity challenge.	498,000	#11
34/07-5	Thursday, 2 June 2022	Immunity Pressure Test: Marco Pierre White's Panache of Sea Scallops, Calamari and Ink Sauce - Alvin, Harry, Keyma, Michael, Mindy, Montana and Tommy competed for immunity in a pressure test set by Marco Pierre White. They had 45 minutes to recreate his panache of sea scallops and calamari with an ink sauce. Overall, the judges were impressed by the contestants' dishes, but they felt that Keyma's dish best resembled Marco's, and she won Weekly Immunity and became the first contestant in the top 12.	463,000	#10
34/07-6	Thursday, 2 June 2022	MasterClass: Jock Zonfrillo, Andy Allen, Thi Le, Nick Riewoldt and Mindy Woods - Jock and Andy cooked their favourite rainy day dishes, while guest chef Thi Le made her turmeric chicken bánh mì. Mindy and former Celebrity MasterChef Australia winner Nick Riewoldt then cooked dishes featuring extra virgin olive oil.	304,000	#19
Week 8
35/08-1	Sunday, 5 June 2022	All-In Elimination: Marco Pierre White's Pantry — In an all-in elimination set by Marco Pierre White, contestants had to use condiments that Marco would usually have in his pantry. Aldo's calamari imbuttunat, Alvin's prawns with red sauce and egg floss, Billie's crispy potatoes with beef tartare and BBQ meatloaf sauce, and Tommy's steamed fish with soy sauce were the stand-out dishes. However, Daniel's beef mince pot pie and Harry's whole baked flounder with herb and butter sauce received criticism. While Daniel's minced meat was criticised for being flavourless, Harry's flounder was overcooked and overpowered by the sauce, and she was eliminated.	504,000	#5
36/08-2	Monday, 6 June 2022	Burnt Mystery Box — Dave Pynt set the Mystery Box with contestants having to use fire in at least one element of their dishes. Sarah's Indian frankies were declared the best dish and she won a strategical advantage for the next team challenge. However, Alvin's eggplants with miso satay sauce, Billie's frozen ricotta with peaches, Steph's dessert, and Montana's savoury dish were declared the Bottom 4 and they were sent to the Pressure Test.	557,000	#10
37/08-3	Tuesday, 7 June 2022	Melissa Cryptic Pressure Test: Andreas Papadakis' Tipomisu — In a pressure test set by Andreas Papadakis, contestants had to recreate his tipomisu using only a review written by Melissa. Billie excelled and her dish was declared nearly identical to Andreas's, whereas Steph had forgotten to put vanilla in her brownie, and as a result, it tasted overwhelmingly eggy. Because the brownie was the foundation of Andrea's dish, the judges felt that Steph had missed the brief and she was eliminated.	542,000	#7
38/08-4	Wednesday, 8 June 2022	Japanese or Italian Restaurant Team Challenge — The contestants were split into two teams to cook either Japanese or Italian cuisine. Since Sarah won the strategical advantage, she chose which cuisine her team would cook and she chose Japanese. In her team were Mindy, Aldo, Montana, Daniel and Alvin. Their dessert was the dish of the day and their mains and entrees were declared better than the Italian team's (Tommy, Michael, Julie, Billie and Keyma). Hence, they won the team challenge.	437,000	#15
39/08-5	Thursday, 9 June 2022	Movie Snacks Immunity Challenge — Team challenge winners Daniel, Alvin, Montana, Sarah, Mindy and Aldo competed in a two-round immunity challenge. The first round was a taste test of flavoured popcorn, with Aldo, Alvin and Mindy out of the running after guessing a flavour incorrectly. For the second round, Montana, Daniel and Sarah had to create their own choc top. Montana brought a brown butter and fig choc top. Sarah presented a mango kulfi white choc top. The highest praise, however, went to Daniel's peanut butter and bacon choc top, nicknamed 'You're Bacon Me Go Nuts'. As a result, Daniel won Weekly Immunity and became the first contestant in the Top 10. In addition, Deliveroo made and delivered a version of his choc top for its Australian customers.	438,000	#8
Week 9 (Top 10 Week)
40/09-1	Sunday, 12 June 2022	Rick Stein's All-In Postcard Elimination — The 10 contestants, aside from Daniel, faced an elimination challenge set by Rick Stein. They had 75 minutes to cook a "postcard" dish evocative of a location they had traveled to. Billie's Spanish shellfish stew, Aldo's eggplant parmigiana and meatballs, Julie's coq au vin, Keyma's fileja alla 'Nduja, and Sarah's crab xacuti all received exceptional feedback, with Mindy's satay ayam, Alvin's nasi lemak, Tommy's banh khọt also being very well received. The judges liked the elements of Montana's American Christmas roast, but criticised her for not serving the chicken whole. The prawns and mussels in Michael's American cioppino were cooked well and the broth was tasty, but the fish was unevenly cooked. While the judges felt that Montana and Michael's dishes had flaws, they felt that Michael had missed the mark. This error was enough to send him home, finalising the Top 10.	552,000	#3
41/09-2	Monday, 13 June 2022	Everything Mystery Box — The judges announced that any contestant who cooked a top dish in any challenge this week would automatically win immunity from the elimination on Sunday. Additionally, they would also get a chance to compete for the seventh and final immunity pin of the season and one contestant will be eliminated. For the first challenge of the week, the 10 contestants were given a mystery box containing milk, Carisma potatoes, shio koji, watercress, tommy ruff, green peppercorns, swordbelt mushrooms, and freekeh. Given 60 minutes to cook, the contestants were to include all the ingredients from the mystery box in their final dishes. Tommy's poached tommy ruff, Billie's fish pie, and Julie's gnocchi all received acclaim from the judges, with Billie edging out Tommy and Julie to win immunity from the elimination, as well as the first spot in the immunity pin challenge.	577,000	#8
42/09-3	Tuesday, 14 June 2022	DIY Pressure Test — The contestants, aside from Billie, had to write their own recipe worthy of being delivered as a pressure test. The top two cooks would be declared safe from the elimination and would win the chance to compete for the final immunity pin of the season. Having planned their recipes overnight, the contestants were given two hours to cook their dishes. Sarah's falooda-inspired dessert, Keyma's hallacas, and Alvin's pork snack plate all wowed the judges, but they were beaten by Mindy's crispy fried snapper and Daniel's paperbark barramundi with aromatic broth. Mindy and Daniel were awarded immunity from the elimination and won the chance to compete against Billie in the immunity pin challenge.	572,000	#7
43/09-4	Wednesday, 15 June 2022	Fruit Salad Reinvention Test — The contestants, aside from Billie, Mindy, and Daniel, had to reimagine fruit salad. Given 75 minutes to make their dishes, most of the contestants struggled with the brief and received mixed feedback on their execution. However, Montana, Alvin, and Julie received acclaim for their creative reinventions of the classic dish. The judges especially commended the originality and unexpectedness of Julie's fruit salad Thai curry and deemed it the winning dish, beating Montana's fruit salad aguachile and Alvin's fruit salad rojak. Julie won immunity from the elimination and took her place alongside Billie, Mindy, and Daniel in the immunity pin challenge, leaving the other contestants to face elimination.	554,000	#10
44/09-5	Thursday, 16 June 2022	Time Auction Immunity Pin Challenge — In a time auction, contestants had to bid time for ingredients, with the best dish receiving the final immunity pin of the season. Mindy had 85 minutes to cook with tripe, root vegetables and flavour bombs, Julie had 75 minutes to cook with lamb, nightshades and vinegars, Billie had 40 minutes to cook with eggs, tropical fruits and spices and Daniel had 30 minutes to cook with Moreton Bay bugs, onions and herbs. Billie's passionfruit parfait with pineapple and saffron wowed the judges. However, she was narrowly beaten by Julie, who cooked a Middle Eastern-inspired dish featuring lamb and nightshades.	473,000	#8
Week 10
45/10-1	Sunday, 19 June 2022	Three Rounds, One Ingredient Elimination — Aldo, Alvin, Montana, Keyma, Sarah and Tommy were given the choice to use a single pumpkin, chicken, or pink snapper across three rounds. Aldo, Sarah, Tommy, and Keyma all chose to cook with a pink snapper, and Montana and Alvin chose to cook with a chicken. In the first round, Keyma and Sarah impressed with their pink snapper ceviches, and were declared safe. In the second round, Aldo and Montana succeeded with their snapper acqua pazza and chicken skin dessert, respectively, thus avoiding the final round. In the third round, Tommy and Alvin had to cook with the remaining parts of their ingredient. Tommy's take on Vietnamese rice cakes with a fish broth and mango salad was well-received, however, while his fish was perfectly cooked and the broth was tasty, his dish fell short with his rice cakes. Alvin took a big gamble with his dish back in season 2. However, while the judges were impressed with Alvin's drunken chicken, he cooked the best dish in his entire life. Ultimately, Alvin's dish was deemed "unbeatable" and was dish of the day, and Tommy was eliminated.	484,000	#7
46/10-2	Monday, 20 June 2022	Tiny Plate Mystery Box — Contestants had to cook with miniature-sized ingredients (school prawns, baby cauliflower, quail, micro basil, chardonnay, baby mandarins, fresh garlic, mini Oreo biscuits, and tiny tomatoes) to create a dish on a tiny plate. Billie's cookies and cream choux and Julie's quail à la mandarin were declared the top two dishes, with Daniel's pan-seared quail breast with charred cauliflower florets receiving a special mention. However, Mindy's quail wontons and Montana's quail with cauliflower and tomato and basil salad dish both contained bones, and Aldo's panzanella salad with school prawns failed to impress the judges. Having cooked the bottom three dishes, Mindy, Aldo, and Montana were sent to the pressure test.	600,000	#8
47/10-3	Tuesday, 21 June 2022	Khanh Nguyen Pressure Test — Khanh Nguyen returned to set a pressure test. His seafood plate contained 99 ingredients, 143 steps and 13 pages in the recipe. Mindy excelled in the cook and presented a near-perfect version to the judges. Both Aldo and Montana's dishes had serious flaws and, in a close decision, Montana was eliminated due to pieces of oyster shell present in her dish.	583,000	#7
48/10-4	Wednesday, 22 June 2022	Loved Ones Service Challenge — Contestants were divided into two teams and asked to cook with three herbs: tarragon, Thai basil and coriander. They had to cook for the judges as well as their loved ones, who were visitors for the day. The green team (Mindy, Daniel, Aldo and Billie) won the main course, but the aqua team (Julie, Alvin, Keyma, and Sarah) won the entree and dessert and they were given a chance to compete for immunity.	556,000	#6
49/10-5	Thursday, 23 June 2022	Prickly Ingredients Immunity Challenge — Team challenge winners Julie, Alvin, Keyma and Sarah each chose one of the four prickly ingredients: chestnuts, stinging nettles, sea urchin and prickly pear, to feature in their dish. Alvin chose to cook with sea urchin, Sarah chose chestnuts, Julie cooked with stinging nettles and Keyma made a dessert with prickly pear. The challenge proved to be overwhelming for all four contestants, with all of them presenting disappointing dishes. Julie's nettle oil lacked balance, her salmon was flat and underseasoned and overall, the dish lacked acidity, Alvin ruined his sea urchins by leaving his noodles on the heat, Sarah undercooked her chicken despite well-received chestnut puree and Keyma dropped her cake on the floor of the kitchen. The judging came down to the element that featured the prickly ingredient the best, with Keyma's prickly pear sorbet beating Sarah's chestnut puree. As a result, Keyma was awarded immunity from Sunday's all-in elimination.	480,000	#8
49/10-6	Thursday, 23 June 2022	MasterClass: Jock Zonfrillo, Andy Allen, Natalie Paull, Aldo Ortado, and Daniel Lamble- Jock and Andy demonstrated their favourite mud crab dishes, chef Natalie Paull made her carrot cake with cheesecake layers, and Aldo and Daniel cooked their favourite midnight snacks.	331,000	#15
Week 11
50/11-1	Sunday, 26 June 2022	Hugh Allen's All-In Elimination — The contestants other than Keyma had to cook a dish featuring the ingredient either in front of them or the one hidden under the cloche, both selected by chef Hugh Allen. They had to cook with the other ingredient in round 2. Alvin, Mindy, Sarah and Daniel chose corn, celeriac, lemon myrtle (under the cloche) and wattleseed nut, and saved themselves. Aldo, Billie and Julie proceeded to round 2, as Aldo's quandong sauce was grainy although the duck was perfectly cooked, Julie's terrine didn't feature enough of the golden beetroot and Billie's Jerusalem artichoke panna cotta was firmer than expected. In round 2, Aldo and Billie had to cook with cucumber and wasabi respectively (both under the cloche) and Julie had to cook with the lion's mane mushroom she had passed on in the first round. After Julie used her immunity pin, it came down to Aldo's cucumber salad with spanner crab and Billie's wasabi beef tartare. Billie's tartare had more of a "wow" factor than Aldo's salad; hence he was eliminated.	518,000	#7
51/11-2	Monday, 27 June 2022	Rainbow Mystery Box — For this mystery box, the cooks were given ingredients that were all colourful - painted crayfish, scampi caviar, fruit loops, dragonfruit, multicoloured corn, fennel mukhwas, flowering pineapple sage, rainbow chard and turmeric. Daniel's fairy mille-feuille and Sarah's crayfish and rainbow chard cigars were the top two dishes. However, Billie's mukhwas choux had technical issues, Julie's rainbow crayfish salad was overpowered by the turmeric, and Mindy's rainbow crayfish with egg noodles was criticized. Having cooked the bottom three dishes, Billie, Julie and Mindy were sent to the pressure test.	579,000	#8
52/11-3	Tuesday, 28 June 2022	Kirsten Tibballs Pressure Test — Kirsten Tiballs returned to present her intricate ‘cherry on top’ cake. Billie, Julie and Mindy had three hours and fifteen minutes to recreate her dessert. All three faced hardships during the cook. During the tasting, Billie's dish was declared to be the closest to Kirsten's. Julie's cake's exterior was rough compared to Kirsten's, but other than that, there were hardly any other flaws in her interior. Mindy, on the other hand, presented an exterior similar to Kirsten's, but there were a lot of major flaws in the interior. Ultimately, the judges felt that Mindy had missed the brief and she was eliminated.	580,000	#7
53/11-4	Wednesday, 29 June 2022	Blind Pairing Duel Challenge — The final six were paired up and allowed to pick two ingredients each from a pantry. They faced off against the contestant with the same colour apron for a spot in the immunity challenge. The pairs were Daniel & Sarah, Alvin & Keyma and Billie & Julie. They had sixty minutes to cook using only the ingredients that they and their partner selected. Billie & Julie selected lemon, garlic, prawns and star anise, and Julie won. Daniel & Sarah picked fermented bean curd, steak, onions and asparagus, and Sarah won. Alvin & Keyma picked fish sauce, gochujang, habanero chillies and plantains, and Alvin won.	559,000	#7
54/11-5	Thursday, 30 June 2022	Time Shopping Immunity Challenge — Contestants purchase their ingredients, using time as their currency. The more ingredients they purchased, the less time on the clock. Julie's orange upside down cake with an orange and ginger ice cream was outstanding, although she did not serve the undercooked parts. Julie won immunity and became the first member of the top 5.	516,000	#8
Week 12 (Finals Week)
55/12-1	Sunday, 3 July 2022	Two-Round Oyster Bay Elimination — The Top 6 traveled to Tasmania to kick off Finals Week. They harvested their own oysters from the ocean in Great Oyster Bay, and all the contestants except Julie competed in a two-round elimination challenge. For the first round, the contestants were given 30 minutes to prepare condiments and accompaniments to dress six fresh oysters. Daniel's grilled and smoked oysters with soy sauce and coconut vinaigrette was declared the best dish, and he was the first to be declared safe. Following a split decision, Sarah's Goan-spiced Oysters Kilpatrick beat Billie's oysters with chicken fat dressing, and she was also declared safe. Billie, Keyma, and Alvin were left to cook in the 75-minute second round and prepare a dish celebrating oysters. Billie's Oysters Kilpatrick custard and Keyma's oyster Pisca Andina were well-received, but Alvin's Singaporean oyster omelette suffered from some textural issues. Ultimately, Alvin's dish failed to meet expectations, and he was sent home, finalizing the Top 5.	611,000	#3
56/12-2	Monday, 4 July 2022	Truffle Hunt Immunity Challenge — The Top 5 traveled to a truffle farm in Launceston and hunted for their own truffles with dogs. They were then given 60 minutes to prepare a dish highlighting the ingredient. Sarah, Billie, and Daniel's dishes were well-received, but all suffered from some negatives. Keyma's cachapa-inspired truffle dish and Julie's truffle-stuffed quail dish were declared the best dishes, and Keyma narrowly beat Julie to win immunity from the elimination and secure her place in the Top 4.	624,000	#7
57/12-3	Tuesday, 5 July 2022	Distillery Service Elimination — The last day in Tasmania saw the contestants visiting a distillery. Sarah, Daniel, Billie and Julie were each tasked with one course in a four-course service challenge. All of them needed to feature gin or whiskey in their dishes. The first course was presented by Sarah with mushroom and whiskey broth with togarashi parsnip chips. The second course was presented by Daniel, with gin squid served to the judges instead of a salmon confit which ended up overcooked. It was the dish of the day. Third was Billie's pearl barley encrusted lamb which also was well received. The meal was ended with Julie's whiskey toffee pudding, Whiskey Chili Ice Cream and Whiskey Caramel Sauce to dive for. It looked a million bucks in a plate and more than that, she hit the brief. While Sarah's broth was well balanced and her mushrooms and turnips were also great, the flavour of her broth was distracted by the togarashi. But the major flaw of Julie's pudding was overcooked and burnt, and, in the end, the judges felt that Julie's dish wasn't finals worthy, and she was eliminated, finalising the four finalists in the Grand Finale Week.	587,000	#7
58/12-4	Wednesday, 6 July 2022	Fast Track to the Semi-Finals: Home Cook to Pro Cook — Billie, Daniel, Keyma and Sarah faced off in a two-round challenge for a fast-track to the semi-finals. In round one, they had 60 minutes to cook a dish using the staple ingredients and cooking equipment found in average household kitchens. Sarah's boudin blanc with cassoulet and Billie's apple crumble and parfait stood out, and they advanced to the second round. A new high-tech kitchen was revealed, and they were given 90 minutes and full access to the pantry and garden to create a "pro cook" dish using the advanced equipment on offer. The judges enjoyed Sarah's confit scallops with a compound butter sauce and herb beurre blanc, but felt that she had poured too much of the sauce onto the dish as she was plating, thus overpowering the scallops. The judges loved Billie's saffron mousse with cherry sauce, inspired by her grandmother's peach dessert, and deemed it free of negatives. Therefore, Billie won the fast-track to the semi-finals and secured her spot in the Top 3.	583,000	#6
59/12-5	Thursday, 7 July 2022	MasterClass: Jock Zonfrillo, Andy Allen and the Final Four — In the final MasterClass of the season, Jock and Andy went head-to-head in a pub classic invention test, judged by Melissa and the final four, and Jock won. Billie, Daniel and Keyma then competed against the two judges in a three-course service challenge, having to feature pork, honey and watermelon in their dishes, and the judges won.	482,000	#9
Week 13 (Grand Finale Week)
60/13-1	Sunday, 10 July 2022	Pressure Test: Peter Gilmore's Raw Abrohols Island Scallop and Moo — Daniel, Sarah and Keyma competed in the final pressure test of the season, set by Peter Gilmore. They had two hours and thirty minutes to re-create two of Gilmore's most complex signature dishes: his raw Abrohols Island scallop with katsuobushi cream, Ossetra caviar and sea cucumber crackling, and Moo, a dessert consisting of a salted oloroso caramel, prune jam, vanilla ice cream and cocoa tuiles. Daniel, who fell behind in making his katsuobushi cream, excelled in the cook and his dishes tasted exactly like Peter's and were dishes of the day. Sarah burnt the biscuits for her dessert, forcing her to remake them, and her whipped cream was too soft. Keyma, however, struggled. She didn't have enough katsuobushi cream, throwing off the balance of her scallop dish. The whipped cream for her dessert split after she used the wrong amounts of double and pure cream, and her ice cream was too icy. Due to these negatives across both dishes, she was eliminated.	604,000	#5
61/13-2	Monday, 11 July 2022	Semi-Finals: Service Challenge — Sarah, Billie, and Daniel were given five-and-a-half hours to prepare and serve a three-course menu to twenty diners, as well as the three judges. Shannon Bennett returned to the kitchen to run the pass, as well as to provide mentorship and support to the three semi-finalists. Billie served all three of her courses on time, but her entree and her main had a few issues. The judges were excited about Billie's entree but while her mussels were cooked well, the flavours in her pea and horseradish soup entrée were out of balance, and in the end, they left a bit confused and the duck in her apricot chicken-inspired main course was overcooked. However, her Lamington-inspired dessert was deemed faultless, and it was dish of the day. Sarah's curry scampi entrée was very well received, but her main and dessert were served late. While her lamb saag main course was rich and complex, she was also late for service and her dessert contained undercooked pears. Daniel's cured kingfish entrée arrived on time and was acclaimed, but his main course and dessert both arrived late and were also marked with flaws. The coral trout in his main had perfectly cooked fish but it contained rubbery skin, and his curry sauce was unbalanced. His pineapple tarte tatin dessert was not his finest work, and while the flavours were good, the execution was well off the mark. Billie excelled in punctuality, and Sarah had cooked the strongest dishes overall, but Daniel had missed the mark on both those measures. This combine the fact that two flawed courses that were served late, Daniel was eliminated in third place, leaving Sarah and Billie to advance to the Grand Finale.	693,000	#6
62/13-3	Tuesday, 12 July 2022	Grand Finale — The Grand Finale consisted of two rounds instead of the usual three, thus giving more weight to the dessert pressure test. In the first round, Billie and Sarah were presented with three challenges: a mystery box, a brief and a cloche, from which they were each allowed to remove one. Billie took the mystery box off the table, after which Sarah removed the cloche, leaving both of them to cook with the brief. They then had 75 minutes to cook a dish that was both sweet and savoury. Sarah sailed through the challenge, and her butter chicken-inspired sticky wingettes with a sweet and savoury gravy was praised for both hitting the brief and for being luxurious and well-balanced. She received 26 points. Billie, on the other hand, struggled in the challenge, having to scrap a failed sorbet element and re-evaluate her dish halfway through the cook. Ultimately, the judges were impressed by the flavours of her cumin panna cotta with rosemary and rhubarb, but the panna cotta had failed to set. As a result, she received 21 points and fell behind Sarah. In the second round, they were given five hours and fifteen minutes to replicate Heston Blumenthal's Taffety Tart, consisting of ten elements. Sarah's dish matched Heston's in presentation and flavour, but missed the mark with some of the textures. Her puff pastry was too hard, and not as delicate as Heston's. Additionally, she had been very cautious about not adding too much liquid nitrogen to her ice cream, which backfired when it ended up being too loose. She received a 7 from Andy and Heston and an 8 from Jock and Melissa, giving her a total score of 56 points. Billie fell behind throughout the challenge, being dissatisfied with her puff pastry and crumble, and choosing to remake both from scratch despite being short on time. However, both of these risks paid off when the judges were amazed with her final dish. They all felt that she was near-perfect in terms of presentation, flavour, and texture, receiving a 9 from Jock, Andy, and Heston, and a 10 from Melissa. With this, she was able to catch up to and narrowly overtake Sarah, landing at a final score of 58 points. Ultimately, the minor textural errors in the pressure test cost Sarah the win, with Billie securing the title again, and becoming the first cook in MasterChef history to win the competition twice.	755,000	#6
62/13-3	Tuesday, 12 July 2022	Winner Announced - Billie McKay won the title of MasterChef 2022 and the $250,000 grand prize, while Sarah Todd received $30,000 as the runner-up. Daniel Lamble received $20,000 for finishing in third place.	875,000	#3
