= Sarah Todd =

Australian chef

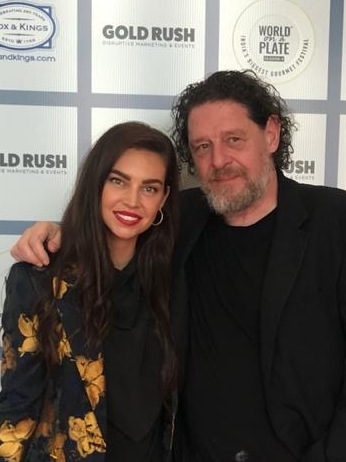
- Todd with Marco Pierre White
- Born: 26 October 1987 (age 39); Mackay, Queensland, Australia
- Occupations: Chef; model; restaurateur; author
- Known for: MasterChef Australia
- Partner: Declan Cleary
- Children: 3

Sarah Todd (born 26 October 1987) is an Australian celebrity chef, restaurateur, cookbook author, television personality, and model. She first gained recognition through her appearance on the sixth series of MasterChef Australia in 2014, where she finished ninth. Since then, she has established a culinary career, opening restaurants in India, authoring cookbooks, and hosting television programs. In 2022, she returned as a fan-favourite contestant for the fourteenth series, MasterChef Australia: Fans & Favourites, finishing as runner-up. She later competed in the show's seventeenth series, MasterChef Australia: Back To Win in 2025, finishing sixth.

== Career ==
Todd trained at Le Cordon Bleu, London. She competed on the sixth season of MasterChef Australia in 2014. After cooking aloo gobi on the show, she gained over 50,000 social media followers from India.

In 2015, Todd opened her first restaurant, Antares in Goa, India, which she co-owns and operates. The building and opening of Antares was documented in the SBS Australia series My Restaurant in India, which aired in Australia in 2016. The series has been aired in 150 countries.

During the time Todd spent in Goa, she also filmed Serve It Like Sarah, a 10-episode adventure, travel and food series airing on Fox Life India, Choice TV, New Zealand and Foxtel from 2016.

Todd's first cookbook My Healthy Model Cookbook was published by Penguin Australia in 2016.

In 2017, Todd joined fellow judges, Riyaaz Amlani and Vishal Dadlani, in the reality TV Show 'Grilled' on Fox Life India.

In 2018, Todd hosted the documentary Awesome Assam With Sarah Todd, which aired on Fox Life India, National Geographic Channel and Foxtel. The show was also featured in the Broadcast Audience Research Council India report and the content increased the viewership for the slot by almost 60%. It also had the second best ATS (Average Time Spent) among all the other content in the week on National Geographic.

In 2019, My Second Restaurant In India, which documents the building and opening Todd's second restaurant, The Wine Rack in Mumbai, aired on SBS Australia, W Channel in the UK, Choice TV New Zealand and Fox Life India.

On 8 January 2019, a local was burning land next door to her restaurant Antares in Goa, when embers flew onto the property causing a major fire. Three months later, the restaurant was rebuilt and in operation.

In 2020, Todd was invited to compete on Masterchef Australia's twelfth season, which exclusively featured high-performing past contestants who had failed to win their respective seasons. However, she refused the offer due to being busy with her career commitments at the time.

In 2022, Todd was again invited to compete on MasterChef Australia's fourteenth season, this time featuring a mix of returning contestants and new contenders. She accepted the offer, going on to improve upon her original placing by seven spots and finishing runner-up, with Billie McKay winning the title for the second time.

In 2025, Todd was invited for the third time to compete on MasterChef Australia's seventeenth season, featuring past contestants who have yet to win the title. She was eliminated on 27 July, finishing sixth.

== Personal life ==
Todd was in a relationship with Devinder Garcha. They had a son together in 2011. She and Garcha became engaged in 2013 but subsequently broke up.

In June 2025 it was confirmed that Todd and fellow MasterChef Australia: Back To Win contestant Declan Cleary had become partners after meeting on the show. In an announcement post on Facebook, Todd announced that she was pregnant. She gave birth to twin girls, Claudia and Charlotte, in December 2025.

== Filmography ==
| Year | Title | |
|---|---|---|
| 2012 | On Top | Todd appeared in the music video for the Johnny Ruffo song On Top which peaked at number 14 on the Australian ARIA charts. |
| 2014 | MasterChef Australia | Eliminated in Episode 28, won her place back into the competition in Episode 36, and was re-eliminated in Episode 45, finishing ninth. |
| 2016 | My Restaurant In India | In My Restaurant in India, follows Todd through the life-changing experience of chasing her dreams and setting up a business in Goa, India. |
| 2016 | Serve It Like Sarah | Australian cook Sarah Todd is in Goa, India where she is on a quest to immerse herself in the local cuisine. In Serve It Like Sarah, you will see her learn new cooking techniques and meet new people. You will get to watch along as she catches crabs, bakes with Goa's best, and visits an historic Portuguese mansion |
| 2017 | Grilled | Riyaaz Amlani, Vishal Dadlani and Sarah Todd grill the skills of aspiring entrepreneurs on the show. The winner of the 10-part series will clinch the ultimate dream investment of up to Rs 1.5 crore to start up their own culinary venture. |
| 2018 | Awesome Assam with Sarah Todd | The one-hour program is hosted by Sarah Todd and Udayan Duarah of Assam and showcases the heritage and vibrant beauty of the state, spread across Umananda to Majuli. |
| 2018 | The Good Cooks | In episode two of The Good Cooks, Aussie chef and restaurateur, Sarah Todd, travels to Fiji to learn both how ACIAR is helping local farmers and to learn how to cook like a Fijian. |
| 2019 | My Second Restaurant In India | Sequel of My Restaurant In India |
| 2020 | The Perfect Serve | Cross promotion with the Australian Open. |
| 2022 | MasterChef Australia | Runner-Up; granted $10,000 cash prize for winning Immunity Pin challenge, as well as $30,000 cash prize for placing runner-up. |
| 2022 | Hungry | Co-host a six part document series with George Calombaris |
| 2022 | Food Tales | Todd appeared in a Netflix four-episode documentary series as curator of Singapore's outdoor food festival GastroBeats for 2022, exploring the hawker culture in Singapore while featuring some of the stalls involved. |
