= Sashi Cheliah =

Singaporean-born Australian cook

- Born: Sashikumar Cheliah; 10 June 1979 (age 47); Singapore
- Education: ITE College, Yishun
- Occupation: Chef
- Predecessor: Diana Chan
- Successor: Larissa Takchi
- Spouse: Rabicca Vijayan (m. 1997)

Sashikumar Cheliah (born 10 June 1979) is a Singaporean-born Australian chef of Indian descent who won the tenth season of MasterChef Australia in 2018. He established his culinary career by opening pop-up restaurants in Melbourne and Adelaide. In 2022, he expanded his ventures to Chennai, India, and returned as a fan-favourite contestant for the show's fourteenth season, MasterChef Australia: Fans & Favourites, where he finished in 19th place. He currently appears on Celebrity MasterChef Tamil (2026) as one of three judges, alongside chefs Venkatesh Bhat and Shreeya Adka.

== Background and personal life ==
Cheliah was born and raised in Singapore where he attended Swiss Cottage Secondary School and ITE College, Yishun. He is the eldest of seven children. For 12 years, Cheliah worked for the Special Tactics and Rescue (STAR) unit of the Singapore Police Force (SPF), where he trained in tactics, rescue operations, counter terrorism, kidnappings and high-profile protection in the riot police. Cheliah is married to Rabicca Vijayan, who works as a nurse. They have two sons. The family moved to Adelaide, South Australia, Australia in 2012.

== Culinary career ==
Cheliah's interest in food began by watching his mother, who owned a café, and his aunties prepare family meals. His interest in cooking grew further after he moved to Australia. Cheliah was selected in the Top 24 to contest MasterChef Australia in 2018. He reached the finale on 31 July, which he won with a record 93 points out of 100. In 2022, Cheliah returned to compete on the show's fourteenth season, which featured a mix of returning contestants and new contenders. He finished in 19th place.

Cheliah started a pop-up restaurant named Gaja by Sashi in the Melbourne CBD, serving Singaporean dishes. In November 2019, Cheliah opened his restaurant Gaja in his home town of Adelaide.
