= Inch Chua =

- 蔡昀娟
- Inch Chua in 2026 in Geneva
- Born: Chua Yun Juan; 22 December 1988 (age 37); Singapore
- Occupations: Singer-songwriter, Musician, Actress
- Years active: 2004–present
- Musical career
- Also known as: iNCH
- Genres: Acoustic, indie rock, folk, folktronica
- Instruments: Vocals, guitar, piano, synthesizer, keyboard, programming, bass guitar
- Label: House Of Riot!

Chinese name
- Traditional Chinese: 蔡昀娟
- Simplified Chinese: 蔡昀娟
Transcriptions
Standard Mandarin
- Hanyu Pinyin: cài yún juān
- Website: www.thisisinch.com

Inch Chua (born Chua Yun Juan; 22 December 1988), stylized as iNCH, is a Singaporean singer-songwriter, musician, producer, actress and artist previously based in Los Angeles and New York. After rising to fame in Singapore's nascent indie scene as lead singer of the rock band Allura, Chua began to record on her own, blending acoustic folk with alternative rock, electronic music, jazz and pop influence. Inch Chua is backed live by her band, The Metric System.

== Personal life ==
During her childhood, Chua got the nickname "Inch", as this is how her given name Yun Juan may sound if spoken quickly. At 10 years old, Chua had been bitten on her face by a dog, necessitating 135 stitches and leaving some permanent scarring, which increased her sense of social isolation at the conformist all-girls' school she attended. As Chua described later, "I was the one digging for worms in the mud, and having the teachers shout at me for getting dirty. And when they had us drawing circles in class, everyone else would be using a compass, and I'd just shssss, whip one off. The other kids would say, 'That's not a real circle!' and I'd tell them 'You know, not everything has to be perfect.'"

== Musical career ==
Chua grew up without any musical training and became involved in the rock scene during a period of transition in Singapore, when eclectic artists were beginning to rise from the margins to challenge the conservative status quo. The history of rock n roll in the country dates back to the 1960s era of "pop yeh yeh", but for many decades the local scene was known for its lack of hard edges. Even in the 2000s, the mainstream was still dominated by western and Asian pop imports with local musicians pushed mostly to the underground. Chua became addicted, however, to this small alternative scene. Attending gigs, jobs, from the age of 14, she wanted to get involved. Inch Chua's first band was made up of musicians who exchanged their first words in cyberspace. Responding to a request for a singer, Chua found herself fronting Auburn's Epiphany at the age of 16.

=== From Auburn's Epiphany to Allura ===
In 2007, the band were selected to perform at the Baybeats Festival, the island's premier local summer music event. Shortly before the scheduled performance, the band's founder "pulled an Axl Rose," according to Chua, and fired all the other members, including Chua, the lead singer. Chua and her bandmates tried to pull out of the festival, but as the deadline had already passed, their pleas were denied. Scraping together new songs without their founder, they renamed themselves Allura (an unrelated US band originated around the same time) and went on with the show. Singapore's Allura became titans of the local rock scene, developing a cult following for their energetic gigs and the diminutive Chua's soaring, jazz-inflected vocals. The band released a debut EP, Wake Up and Smell the Seaweed, in 2008. But Allura broke up on the verge of recording a full-length album, when the male members of the band were drafted into Singapore's compulsory National Service. Initially planning to work together again, the members remained friends but played their farewell live gig in 2010.

=== Solo career ===
While she was still fronting Allura, Chua enrolled in Singapore's La Salle College of the Arts. She began recording in her bedroom on acoustic guitar, self-producing and teaching herself Garageband and Reason software. Chua also became an early adopter in Singapore of DIY digital distribution methods, making her own songs and dozens of covers and collaborations available to fans worldwide through intimate performances posted to YouTube. After the inception of the Bandcamp website, Chua distributed her studio recordings, beginning with 2009's The Bedroom EP, on a free or "pay what you want" basis through the site. This business strategy earned Chua a bit of mainstream media recognition in Singapore. However, when songs from The Bedroom were featured on Hype Machine and other international blogs, she gained wider recognition, becoming the first Singaporean solo artist ever invited to play at a major US festival, South by Southwest (SXSW) in Austin, Texas. Chua was later invited to represent Singapore at the Shanghai Expo in China the same year.

==== Wallflower ====
In 2010, after returning from these international gigs, Chua released her first full length album, Wallflower. Her work was described as "a schizophrenic potpourri of introspective acoustic tunes, chirpy electronica and introspective lyrics." The title song, as Chua noted in a TEDxSingapore talk, was inspired by her sense of loneliness as a child, a time when she pursued her art privately before opening up to others. The single released from the album, "Hurt," was described by Chua as her eulogy for a lost friend.

After releasing Wallflower to international attention, Chua collaborated with several local pop and hip hop artists, such as singer Nathan Hartono and rapper Shigga Shay, as well as Los Angeles-based YouTube sensation David Choi. Despite her fanbase in Asia (Chua was even asked to perform an original song to feature in a Malaysian mobile phone service TV advert) Chua did not seek to sign to a traditional large label, and she continued to speak directly to her fans via social media, and to focus on concerts, rather than selling recorded albums in stores.

===== MasterChef Singapore =====
In 2021, Chua participated on the second season of the Singaporean cooking reality show MasterChef Singapore, and was eliminated on the second week of the competition.

== Move to Los Angeles ==
Late in 2011, Chua decided to move to US temporarily. She sought to challenge herself with a new environment beyond Singapore's cozy indie music scene, where touring was more of a challenge. In December 2012, she was invited to perform at global TEDxWomen Conference in Washington D.C. Chua had also recently gone through a romantic break-up, and she began writing rawer songs, with a harsher rock sound than the softer style that marked her solo debut.

Chua wrote many of the songs for her second studio album, Bumfuzzle, during her time away from home, living in Los Angeles and playing small gigs throughout North America. Another DIY project, her second album was professionally recorded in Singapore and mixed and mastered in the US, but it was initially crowd-funded through the Indiegogo service by her fans. This allowed Chua, who had embraced digital distribution from the start, to also release CD and vinyl copies of her work for the first time and to also feature her visual artwork in the physical copies. The album was released on 26 August 2013. It was preceded by a single, "The Artful Dodger," on 5 March.

== Discography ==
=== With Allura ===
- Wake Up and Smell the Seaweed EP (2008)
- 1832 EP (2015)

=== Solo ===
Albums

- The Bedroom EP (2009)
- Peace, Love & Mistletoe EP (2009)
- Wallflower (2010)
- Bumfuzzle (2013)
- Letters To Ubin EP (2015)

Singles

- "Aqueous Oblivion" (2009)
- "Rule The World" (2010)
- "The More We Get Together" (2011)
- "The Artful Dodger" (2013)
- "MouseDeer" (2015)
- "Dust That Moves" (2016)
- "Sun & Moon" (2019)
- "Flags" Ft. Shigga Shay (2020)

== Music videos ==
Year	Song	Director(s)
2009	"Devotion in Reality"	Benjamin Tan
2010	"Rule The World"	Han West & Laetitia Gangotena
2011	"Hurt"	Jacky Lee
2013	"Artful Dodger"	Felipe P. Soares
2013	"Mousedeer"	Sandra Riley Tang & Benjamin Ong
2017	"Simple Kind of Life"	GELOYELLOW
2019	"Sun & Moon"	Jaydenation

Covers

Inch Chua, both as a solo artist and in collaboration with others, has recorded cover versions of work by artists including Shiina Ringo, Britney Spears, Radiohead, Bruno Mars, David Bowie, Nat King Cole, Ming Bridges, Death Cab for Cutie, Foo Fighters, Alicia Keys, Paul McCartney, Air, Beck, David Choi, Bright Eyes and Leonard Cohen. She also covered the song Rubber Duckie, from Sesame Street.
