= MasterChef Singapore season 2 =

Season of television series

MasterChef Singapore
- Season 2
- No. of episodes: 10

Release
- Original network: Mediacorp Channel 5
- Original release: 21 February – 25 April 2021

Season chronology
- ← Previous; Season 1 Next → Season 3

The second season of MasterChef Singapore began airing on 21 February 2021 and ended on 25 April 2021 on Mediacorp Channel 5.

The winner of this season was Derek Cheong, with Leon Lim as the runner-up.

== Top 12 ==
Source for names, hometowns, and ages. Occupations and nicknames as given on air or stated in cites.

| Contestant | Age | Occupation | Status |
|---|---|---|---|
| Derek Cheong | 23 | Engineering student | Winner 25 April |
| Leon Lim | 32 | Tutor | Runner-up 25 April |
| Trish Yee | 31 | Marketing Events Director | Eliminated 18 April |
| Zephyr Eng | 29 | Real Estate Broker | Eliminated 18 April |
| Nor Hadayah Mohamad | 42 | Homemaker | Eliminated 11 April |
| Jai Ganesh | 31 | Embroidery designer and painter/Former SAF officer | Eliminated 4 April |
| Mitchelle Chua | 46 | Flight attendant | Eliminated 28 March |
| Vasunthara “Vasun” Ramasamy | 39 | Private tutor | Eliminated 21 March |
| Melissa "Mel" Lim | 30 | Hotel manager | Eliminated 14 March |
| Tan Oon Yong | 32 | Dentist | Eliminated 7 March |
| Inch Chua | 32 | Singer-songwriter | Eliminated 28 February |
| Danial Khalis Aziz | 30 | Courier Manager | Eliminated 28 February |

== Elimination table ==
| Place | Contestant | Episode | | | | | | | | | | | | | | |
| Place | Contestant | 2 | | 3 | 4 | 5 | | 6 | | 7 | | 8 | | 9 | | 10 |
|---|---|---|---|---|---|---|---|---|---|---|---|---|---|---|---|---|
| 1 | Derek | IN | IN | WIN | WIN | HIGH | IMM | WIN | IMM | IN | IN | IN | IN | IN | IN | WINNER |
| 2 | Leon | HIGH | IMM | PT | PT | IN | WIN | IN | LOW | WIN | WIN | IN | IN | IN | IN | RUNNER-UP |
| 3 | Trish | IN | WIN | WIN | PT | WIN | IMM | IN | WIN | IN | IN | IN | IN | IN | ELIM | |
| 4 | Zephyr | HIGH | IMM | HIGH | PT | IN | IN | IN | WIN | WIN | LOW | IN | LOW | ELIM | | |
| 5 | Nor | IN | WIN | HIGH | PT | HIGH | IMM | IN | WIN | IN | IN | WIN | ELIM | | | |
| 6 | Ganesh | IN | LOW | WIN | LOW | HIGH | IMM | IN | LOW | IN | ELIM | | | | | |
| 7 | Mitchelle | WIN | IMM | WIN | WIN | IN | IN | IN | ELIM | | | | | | | |
| 8 | Vasun | HIGH | IMM | LOW | WIN | IN | ELIM | | | | | | | | | |
| 9 | Mel | HIGH | IMM | WIN | ELIM | | | | | | | | | | | |
| 10 | Oon | HIGH | IMM | ELIM | | | | | | | | | | | | |
| 11 | Danial | IN | ELIM | | | | | | | | | | | | | |
| 11 | Inch | IN | ELIM | | | | | | | | | | | | | |

(WINNER) This cook won the competition.
(RUNNER-UP) This cook finished as a runner-up in the finals.
(WIN) The cook won the individual challenge (Mystery Box Challenge, Skills Test, Pressure Test, or Elimination Test).
(WIN) The cook was on the winning team in the Team Challenge.
(HIGH) The cook was one of the top entries in the individual challenge but didn't win.
(IN) The cook wasn't selected as a top or bottom entry in an individual challenge.
(IN) The cook wasn't selected as a top or bottom entry in a team challenge.
(IMM) The cook didn't have to compete in that round of the competition and was safe from elimination.
(IMM) The cook was selected by Mystery Box Challenge winner and didn't have to compete in the Elimination Test.
(PT) The cook was on the losing team in the Team Challenge, competed in the Pressure Test, and advanced.
(NPT) The cook was on the losing team in the Team Challenge, did not compete in the Pressure Test, and advanced.
(LOW) The cook was one of the bottom entries in an individual challenge or Pressure Test, but advanced.
(LOW) The cook was one of the bottom entries in the Team Challenge, but advanced.
(ELIM) The cook was eliminated from MasterChef.

=== Guest judges ===
- Uncle Roger - Episode 2
- Aaron Wong - Episode 4
- Willin Low - Episode 9

=== Main guest appearances ===
- Zander Ng and Genevieve Lee - Episode 3
- Lay Kwan, Matthew and Jennifer from DBS's Zero Food Waste warriors, Ryan Clift - Episode 5
- Labyrinth "LG" Han and Mandy Pan - Episode 7
- Ivan Brehm - Episode 8
- Ignatius Chan - Episode 9

== Episodes ==
| No. | Title | meWatch Catchup | Original release date |
|---|---|---|---|
| 1 | "Episode 1" | Recap | 21 February 2021 |
Auditions: The 24 home cooks were greeted in the Jewel Changi Airport and they were informed that they would be facing each other in battles to decide who would be receiving a white apron, and told that there are only 12 aprons at stake. Contestants with similar signature dishes were put together against each other to decide which was the best home cook among them. The first battle were between four contestants, Aiman, Alderic, Inch, Mitchelle in shellfish, both Inch and Mitchelle name as co-winners and each received their aprons. In the second heat is Carina and Trish competed in pork, and Trish emerged as the winner and won her the apron. In the third aired heat, Derek and Oon cooked desserts and Derek won; in a surprise twist, Oon was also awarded the apron as well. In the fourth aired, and final audition battle, a four-way fight between Derrick, Leon, Nor and Umar competed in pastries: Leon was the first cook to win the apron, followed by Nor. Five other cooks who also advances to the top 12 were Danial, Ganesh, Mel, Vasun and Zephyr.
| 2 | "Episode 2" | Recap | 28 February 2021 |
Mystery Box Challenge 1: With Uncle Roger as a special guest, the contestants were given spices to cook their dish using one ingredient of their choice as a main ingredient. Contestants were each given an electronic timer of 1 hour to cook, with any remainder of time would bring forward to the upcoming elimination challenge. Once the dishes were sampled, the cooks may not make any more changes. The best dishes would receive immunity in the elimination challenge. Mitchelle was the first contestant to finish, and was immediately named the best dish and was immune; after Nor finished her task, Danial, Derek, Ganesh, Inch, Nor and Trish were announced as the six cooks in the bottom to cook again in the elimination test.; Challenge Winner/Immune: Mitchelle Chua; Immune: Vasun Ramasamy, Leon Lim, Zephyr Eng, Tan Oon Yong, Mel Lim; Elimination Test 1: The contestants were required to cook a dish there reflects on the personality. The judges also announced that two cooks would be sent home at the end of the challenge. Trish and Nor were named the best dishes while Danial, Ganesh and Inch were named the worst.; Winner: Trish Yee and Nor Hadayah Mohamad; Bottom three: Danial Khalis Aziz, Jai Ganesh and Inch Chua; Ganesh was declared safe, thus sending Danial and Inch home.; Eliminated: Danial Khalis Aziz and Inch Chua
| 3 | "Episode 3" | Recap | 7 March 2021 |
Team Challenge 1: Contestants must serve a high tea menu consist of five canapés that would fit the restaurant theme for the Fullerton Bay Hotel, at least three savories and two desserts. As Mitchelle and Vasun were named the best dishes in the last Mystery Box challenge, they were appointed as team captains. Mitchelle as the winner of the last challenge, would choose between two cups to determine the team's color and the theme for their high tea. Mitchelle chose blue and thus going for Asian theme, while Vasun was defaulted to red team with a western theme. The blue team consisted of Mitchelle, Derek, Zephyr, Ganesh and Mel, while the red team consist of Vasun, Nor, Oon, Leon and Trish. Both teams were also coached by season 1 winner Zander Ng and runner-up Genevieve Lee for the task. The blue team won the challenge with 49 votes to red team's 12, sending them to the Pressure test.; Team Challenge Winners/Immune: Mitchelle Chua, Derek Cheong, Zephyr Eng, Jai Ganesh and Mel Lim; Pressure Test 1: The red team were given 60 minutes to cook a new variant of Singapore-style noodles using any ingredients from the pantry. Trish and Nor were named the best dishes, and Oon and Vasun were named the worst dishes.; Challenge Winners: Trish Yee and Nor Hadayah Mohamad; Bottom two: Tan Oon Yong and Vasun Ramasamy; Oon was eliminated.; Eliminated: Tan Oon Yong
| 4 | "Episode 4" | Recap | 14 March 2021 |
Team Challenge 2: The nine cooks were split into three teams of three to cook a hawker culture dish. The task is a relay challenge, with each cook having 30 minutes to cook one part of the dish; once time expires, the cook have 45 seconds to handover to the next cook before they could continue. The cooks played Musical chairs to decide the teams with the colored apron hidden under each bench. The red team, in order of relay, consist of Leon, Mel and Ganesh, the blue team consist of Derek, Vasun and Mitchelle, and the yellow team consist of Zephyr, Trish and Nor. The Blue team won the challenge and thus granting immunity.; Team Challenge Winners/Immune: Derek Cheong, Vasun Ramasamy and Mitchelle Chua; Invention Test 1: The six cooks were given 75 minutes to cook a dish that consist of either one of the three 'scariest' ingredients presented by each judge- Bjorn Shen presented a monkfish, Damien D’Silva presented lamb's brain, and Audra Maurice presented blue cheese; the best dishes were respectively named to Zephyr, Leon and Ganesh, thus Trish, Mel and Nor were sent to the bottom three.; Challenge Winner: Zephyr Eng, Leon Lim and Jai Ganesh; Bottom three: Trish Yee, Mel Lim and Nor Hadayah Mohamad; Mel was named the overall worst dish, eliminating her.; Eliminated: Mel Lim
| 5 | "Episode 5" | Recap | 21 March 2021 |
Mystery Box Challenge 2: The eight cooks were tasked to cook a dish using only ingredients from the given crates in front of them, common leftover ingredients, with each ingredient revealed at a 15-minute interval. These ingredients were milk, orange rind and eggs. The winner would receive a $3,000 cash prize credited by DBS's application digibank and immunity from the Elimination Test. Three other cooks with the next best dishes will also be immune in the Elimination. Nor, Derek, Trish and Ganesh was named the best dish. Trish won the challenge and the $3,000 bonus.; Challenge Winner/Immune: Trish Yee; Immune: Nor Hadayah Mohamad, Derek Cheong and Jai Ganesh; Elimination Challenge 2: Contestants had to recreate Chef Ryan Clift's Faux Boudin Noir. Contestants, without first seeing or tasting the dish, or having a recipe to read, had to follow chef Clift as he cooked the dish and gave instructions. They had to finish their own dishes within ten seconds of chef Clift completing his dish. The cooks with the proper execution of Clift's Boudin Noir would pass the challenge. Leon's dish passed, while Vasun's dish was named the worst and sent her packing.; Challenge Winner: Leon Lim; Eliminated: Vasun Ramasamy
| 6 | "Episode 6" | Recap | 28 March 2021 |
Invention Test 2: Contestants were given 60 minutes to cook a dish of a certain international cuisine, with each cuisine assigned to a cook, determined by the country's flag placed under their knife blocks. Nor was given Greek cuisine, Leon with Moroccan, Zephyr with Korean, Ganesh with French, Trish with Mexican, Mitchelle with Italian, and Derek with Thai. The winner with the best dish would be given an "immunity pin", a fashion pin and the immunity to exempt any one of the next three elimination tests, which Derek won.; Challenge Winner: Derek Cheong; Elimination Challenge 3: The remaining seven cooks were given 75 minutes to cook a dessert using ingredients purchased from Lazada's Redmart, including the main ingredient of flour. Derek elect to use his immunity immediately, exempting him from the challenge. The best dishes were Trish, Zephyr and Nor, meaning Mitchelle, Ganesh and Leon were named bottom three.; Immune: Derek Cheong; Challenge Winners: Trish Yee, Zephyr Eng and Nor Hadayah Mohamad; Bottom three: Mitchelle Chua, Jai Ganesh and Leon Lim; Mitchelle was eliminated.; Eliminated: Mitchelle Chua
| 7 | "Episode 7" | Recap | 4 April 2021 |
Teams Challenge 3: Contestants were split into three teams of two to cook a two-course meal using ingredients they got from the Nippon Koi Farm prior. The Red team consist of Trish and Nor, The Green team consist of Leon and Zephyr, and the Blue team consist of Derek and Ganesh. They first have 15 minutes to collect fish from the farm before returning to the kitchen, where they have 60 minutes to cook. The Green team was named the winner.; Challenge Winners: Leon Lim and Zephyr Eng; Invention Test 3: Contestants have 2 hours 15 minutes to recreate a Black Forest ice-cream brownie presented by chef Mandy Pan. As Leon and Zephyr won the prior Team Challenge they were allowed to be assisted by chef Pan twice throughout the test. Leon was named the best dish and Zephyr and Ganesh were named bottom two.; Challenge Winner: Leon Lim; Bottom two: Zephyr Eng and Jai Ganesh; Ganesh's dish fell short and was sent home.; Eliminated: Jai Ganesh
| 8 | "Episode 8" | Recap | 11 April 2021 |
Mystery Box Challenge 3: Teams were give 60 minutes to cook a savory dish with coffee (pressed from Nespresso) as a main ingredient. Contestants were each assigned to a different coffee capsule: Nor gets Intenso, Leon gets Arondio, Derek gets Diavolitto, Zephyr gets Double Espresso Scuro and Trish gets Fortado. Nor won the challenge.; Challenge Winner: Nor Hadayah Mohamad; Elimination Challenge 4: Contestants have two hours to recreate four portions of Ivan Brehm's "Not a Bouillabaisse". Each contestant is given a recipe with parts of the procedures blanked out, except Nor who was given the entire recipe, given as an advantage for the previous challenge's win. Though three dishes failed to perform better, Zephyr and Nor were placed in the bottom two.; Bottom two: Zephyr Eng and Nor Hadayah Mohamad; Nor's dish was named the worst, eliminating her.; Eliminated: Nor Hadayah Mohamad
| 9 | "Episode 9" | Recap | 18 April 2021 |
Elimination Challenge 5: The final four cooks were greeted in Iggy's, and chef Willin Low assigned each cook one dish to sample prior to the commencement of the challenge (Zephyr with Otah Bolo Bun and Aka Ebi, Trish with Ock Scotch Egg and Laksa Threadfin, Derek with Tau Kwa Pop and Pho & Goi Cuon, and Leon with Negitoro Kueh Pie Tee and Chendol); cooks had four hours to work on their dishes assigned by White, and 90 minutes to conduct their dinner service, scheduled to begin on 7pm. The cook with the worst performance for the challenge will be eliminated immediately.; The judges eliminated Zephyr.; Eliminated: Zephyr Eng; Elimination Challenge 6: The final three cooks have 90 minutes to cook a dish that will impress the judges to advance to the finals. They have three minutes to access their pantry, thereafter the pantry is closed throughout the remainder of the challenge. However, after gathering the ingredients, the cook's baskets were randomly shuffled by the judges, and the cooks have to use their newly-shuffled baskets to cook their dish.; Derek and Leon advanced through to the final, eliminating Trish.; Eliminated: Trish Yee
| 10 | "Finale" | Recap | 25 April 2021 |
The two finalists will have to prepare three portions of their best appetizer, entrée, and dessert, each with a time limit of 45, 60 and 75 minutes respectively. The results are decided by a point system per each dish (each judge have a 10 point maximum) and the finalist with a higher score after three dishes become the winner.; Appetizer: Leon presented Rojak Roll with Churro, and Derek presented 'Spring Gazpacho with poached prawns. The score are respectively 27.5 and 26.; Entree: Leon presented Shrimp Ravioli with Chili Crab sauce, and Derek presented "The Colours of Fall" Spiced duck breast with square puree, vegetables and orange maple soy glaze. The scores are respectively 26 and 28.; Dessert: Leon presented a Trio of Asian desserts with Ginger Milk Pudding, Gula Melaka Sable and Pandan ice cream, and Derek presented Summer "Pina Colada". The scores are respectively 23.5 and 24.; Final Two: Derek Cheong and Leon Lim; After reviewing all of the meals from the contestants, the final scores are 77-78, making Derek the winner of this year's MasterChef Singapore, winning him the $15,000 kitchen package, a $7,000 cash prize from DBS, the trophy, the cookbook deal, and an internship with Shen and D’Silva.; MasterChef Winner: Derek Cheong
