= MasterChef Singapore season 3 =

MasterChef Singapore
- Season 3
- No. of episodes: 10

Release
- Original network: Mediacorp Channel 5
- Original release: 1 May – 3 July 2022

Season chronology
- ← Previous; Season 2 Next → Season 4

The third season of MasterChef Singapore began airing on 1 May 2022 and ended on 3 July 2022 on Mediacorp Channel 5.

The winner of this season was Johnathan Chew, with Nares Nareskanna as the runner-up and Andi Robani as the finalist.

== Top 12 ==
Source for names, hometowns, and ages. Occupations and nicknames as given on air or stated in cites.

Contestant	Age	Occupation	Status
Johnathan Chew	22	Dental Student	Winner 3 July
S "Nares" Nareskanna	31	Car Salesman	Runner-up 3 July
Andi Robani	41	Visual Arts Teacher	Eliminated 3 July
Sharlene Tan	38	Food Science Teacher	Eliminated 26 June
Ilya Nur Fadhly	36	Food Delivery Driver	Eliminated 19 June
Shamin D'Souza	45	Ex Cabin Crew	Eliminated 19 June; Returned 19 June; Eliminated 12 June
Alfa Matnoor	47	Marketing Consultant	Eliminated 5 June
Fiona Celeste Seow	38	Housewife	Eliminated 5 June
Raj Shagaran Mahalingam	58	Events Producer	Eliminated 29 May
Gooi Jia Yi	22	Science Student	Eliminated 22 May
Eka Mairina	43	Entertainer	Eliminated 8 May
Thomas Chong	24	University Student	Eliminated 8 May

== Elimination table ==
Place	Contestant	Episode																
Place	Contestant	2		3		4	5		6		7		8			9		10
1	Johnathan	WIN	IMM	HIGH	IMM	PT	IN	HIGH	WIN	WIN	IN	IN	IN	WIN	IMM	IN	LOW	WINNER
2	Nares	HIGH	IMM	IN	IN	WIN	IN	WIN	IN	IN	WIN	LOW	IN	IN	WIN	WIN	IMM	RUNNER-UP
3	Andi	IN	IN	HIGH	IMM	WIN	WIN	IMM	IN	LOW	WIN	WIN	IN	WIN	IMM	IN	WIN	ELIM
4	Sharlene	IN	WIN	HIGH	IMM	WIN	HIGH	IMM	HIGH	WIN	LOW	IN	IN	IN	LOW	IN	ELIM	
5	Ilya	HIGH	IMM	WIN	IMM	WIN	HIGH	IMM	IN	LOW	LOW	IN	WIN	IN	ELIM			
5	Shamin	WIN	IMM	IN	IN	WIN	WIN	IMM	IN	IN	IN	ELIM	RET	IN	ELIM			
7	Alfa	IN	IN	HIGH	WIN	WIN	HIGH	IMM	IN	ELIM								
7	Fiona	HIGH	IMM	IN	IN	PT	IN	LOW	IN	ELIM								
9	Raj	IN	IN	HIGH	LOW	LOW	IN	ELIM										
10	Jia Yi	IN	IMM	IN	LOW	ELIM												
11	Eka	IN	ELIM															
11	Thomas	IN	ELIM															

(WINNER) This cook won the competition.
(RUNNER-UP) This cook finished as a runner-up in the finals.
(WIN) The cook won the individual challenge (Mystery Box Challenge, Skills Test, Pressure Test, or Elimination Test).
(IMM) The cook was selected by Mystery Box Challenge winner and didn't have to compete in the Elimination Test.
(WIN) The cook was on the winning team in the Team Challenge.
(HIGH) The cook was one of the top entries in the individual challenge but didn't win.
(IN) The cook wasn't selected as a top or bottom entry in an individual challenge.
(IN) The cook wasn't selected as a top or bottom entry in a team challenge.
(IMM) The cook didn't have to compete in that round of the competition and was safe from elimination.
(IMM) The cook was selected by Mystery Box Challenge winner and didn't have to compete in the Elimination Test.
(RET) The cook won the Reinstation Challenge and returned to the competition.
(PT) The cook was on the losing team in the Team Challenge, competed in the Pressure Test, and advanced.
(NPT) The cook was on the losing team in the Team Challenge, did not compete in the Pressure Test, and advanced.
(LOW) The cook was one of the bottom entries in an individual challenge or Pressure Test, but advanced.
(LOW) The cook was one of the bottom entries in the Team Challenge, but advanced.
(ELIM) The cook was eliminated from MasterChef.

=== Guest judges ===
- Lisa Tang from Kausmo - Episode 4
- Liguang "LG" Han from Labyrinth, Petrina Loh from Morsels - Episode 5
- Ming Tan from V-ZUG, Mohamed Al-Matin from Le Matin Patisserie - Episode 6
- Gaggan Anand - Episode 8
- Kirk Westaway from JAAN, Tristin Farmer from Zen - Episode 9

=== Main guest appearances ===
- Gaggan Anand - Episode 2
- Shee Tse Koon & Lam Chee Kin from DBS Bank - Episode 3
