= MasterChef Singapore season 1 =

MasterChef Singapore
- Season 1
- No. of episodes: 8

Release
- Original network: Mediacorp Channel 5
- Original release: 2 September – 21 October 2018

Season chronology
- Next → Season 2

The first season of MasterChef Singapore began airing on 2 September 2018 and ended on 21 October 2018 on Mediacorp Channel 5.

The winner of this season was Zander Ng, with Genevieve "Gen" Lee as the runner-up.

== Top 18 ==
The top 18 were announced as follows:

Contestant	Age	Occupation	Status
Zander Ng	30	IT Business Manager	Winner 21 October
Genevieve "Gen" Lee	20	Student	Runner-up 21 October
Shamsydar Ani	28	Photographer	Eliminated 14 October
Sharon Gonzago	48	Housewife	Eliminated 14 October
Aaron Wong	41	Photographer	Eliminated 7 October
Sowmiya Venkatesan	40	Marketing Manager	Eliminated 30 September
Diana Ismail	59	Administrative Assistant	Eliminated 23 September
Nicholas Koh	39	Former Logistics Executive	Eliminated 16 September
Joshua Kalinan	51	Inflight Manager	Eliminated 9 September
Nachammai Vidhya	25	Doctor	Eliminated 9 September
Ripon Ali	29	Marketing Freelancer	Eliminated 2 September
Aries Tan	28	Make-up Artist	Eliminated 2 September
Chaik Koh	48	Chief Executive Officer	Eliminated 2 September
Firdaus Kordi	25	Research Assistant	Eliminated 2 September
Juliana Jalil	48	Gym Instructor	Eliminated 2 September
Kuan Yiou Lim	23	Business Student	Eliminated 2 September
Max Koh	27	Hire Car Driver	Eliminated 2 September
Weiyan Chee	30	Neuroscience Researcher	Eliminated 2 September

== Elimination table ==
Place	Contestant	Episode													
Place	Contestant	1			2		3	4		5	6		7		8
1	Zander	IN	IN	IN	IN	IN	WIN	WIN	HIGH	WIN	HIGH	IN	IN	WIN	WINNER
2	Gen	HIGH	IMM	LOW	HIGH	IN	PT	HIGH	LOW	LOW	WIN	IN	WIN	WIN	RUNNER-UP
3	Shamsydar	IN	IN	IN	HIGH	IN	WIN	IN	WIN	PT	HIGH	IN	IN	ELIM	
4	Sharon	IN	IN	HIGH	IN	IN	LOW	IN	HIGH	LOW	IN	IN	ELIM		
5	Aaron	IN	IN	WIN	WIN	WIN	WIN	IN	LOW	WIN	IN	ELIM			
6	Sowmiya	IN	HIGH	LOW	IN	IN	WIN	HIGH	IN	ELIM					
7	Diana	IN	HIGH	HIGH	IN	LOW	LOW	IN	ELIM						
8	Nicholas	HIGH	IMM	IN	IN	WIN	ELIM								
9-10	Joshua	WIN	IMM	IN	IN	ELIM									
9-10	Vidhya	IN	IN	LOW	HIGH	ELIM									
11-15	Aries	LOW	ELIM												
11-15	Chaik	IN	ELIM												
11-15	Juliana	IN	ELIM												
11-15	Kuan Yiou	IN	ELIM												
11-15	Weiyan	LOW	ELIM												
16-18	Ali	ELIM													
16-18	Firdaus	ELIM													
16-18	Max	ELIM													

(WINNER) This cook won the competition.
(RUNNER-UP) This cook finished as a runner-up in the finals.
(WIN) The cook won the individual challenge (Mystery Box Challenge/ Skills Test or Elimination Test).
(WIN) The cook was on the winning team in the Team Challenge and directly advanced to the next round.
(HIGH) The cook was one of the top entries in the individual challenge but didn't win.
(IN) The cook wasn't selected as a top or bottom entry in an individual challenge.
(IN) The cook wasn't selected as a top or bottom entry in a team challenge.
(IMM) The cook didn't have to compete in that round of the competition and was safe from elimination.
(IMM) The cook was selected by Mystery Box Challenge winner and didn't have to compete in the Elimination Test.
(PT) The cook was on the losing team in the Team Challenge, competed in the Pressure Test, and advanced.
(NPT) The cook was on the losing team in the Team Challenge, did not compete in the Pressure Test, and advanced.
(LOW) The cook was one of the bottom entries in an individual challenge or Pressure Test, and they advanced.
(LOW) The cook had the worst dish but was not eliminated from MasterChef.
(LOW) The cook was one of the bottom entries in the Team Challenge and they advanced.
(ELIM) The cook was eliminated from MasterChef.

== Main guest appearances ==
- Calvin Kang — Episode 3
- Muhammad Haikal Johari — Episode 4
- Caden & Max Morrice — Episode 5
- Ming Tan — Episode 5
- Marco Pierre White — Episode 7

== Episodes ==
No.	Title	Toggle Catchup	Original release date
1	"Season Premiere"	Catchup	2 September 2018
Audition Round, Part 1: The Top 18 cooks arrived at CHIJMES Hall where they were greeted by the three judges. Audra informed that in the first round of the final audition, only 10 cooks will earn a place in the MasterChef Kitchen. The first challenge asks the cooks to create a sambal; the first 15 cooks who successfully create their sambal will move on to the next round, with the first three cooks automatically earn a place in the MasterChef Kitchen and the top 10 without having to compete in the next round's challenge. The last three cooks left after the first 15 cooks complete their sambal will be eliminated. Joshua was the first cook to complete the challenge. Then, Nicholas and Gen complete the challenge, advancing them to the MasterChef Kitchen with Joshua. The last chef to be called safe, Aries, barely edged out Max, when both chefs had their sambal ready to sample, with the former raising her hand first. Ali and Firdaus were also eliminated.; Eliminated: Ali, Firdaus and Max; Audition Round, Part 2: As Joshua, Nicholas, and Gen looked on, the remaining 12 cooks took part in the final audition challenge. The remaining cooks are given 30 minutes to prepare a plate of fried rice with a runny sunny-side-up fried egg placed on top and it should pair with the sambal they prepared in first challenge. After judging, the first two cooks to be declared safe were Diana and Sowmiya. The next five cooks to be called, Aries, Chaik, Juliana, Kian Yiou, and Weiyan, were proclaimed as the 'bottom five' dishes by the judges; all five were eliminated from the competition.; Eliminated: Aries, Chaik, Juliana, Kian Yiou, and Weiyan; Elimination Challenge 1: The Top 10 contestants, now with their MasterChef aprons and cooking for the first time in the MasterChef Kitchen, were given their first official challenge of the competition. An elimination challenge, they had one hour to cook a dish that was inspired by their loved ones. The top three and the bottom three (Diana, Gen, Sowmiya, Sharon, Vidhya, and Aaron) were selected to be tasted; Aaron was declared the challenge winner.; Winner: Aaron; Bottom three: Gen, Sowmiya and Vidhya; Vidhya was named the worst dish for the challenge, but the judges saved her from elimination after they were impressed by her grandmother's mutton meatballs, thus no one was eliminated.; Eliminated: None
2	"Episode 2"	Catchup	9 September 2018
Mystery Box Challenge 1: The Top 10 contestants are given one hour to cook a dish that use only the ingredients which reflects the national colours of Singapore – red and white. As Vidhya was named the worst dish in the previous elimination challenge, she was penalised with a five-minute handicap. The top four dishes were Shamsydar, Aaron, Vidhya, and Gen. Aaron wins the challenge.; Challenge Winner: Aaron; Invention Test 1: Aaron is given a choice of three different dishes each representing the cuisines that have most inspired the three judges: D'Silva presented Garam Assam (Peranakan), Shen presented Squid & Schmaltz (Modern Middle East), and Morrice presented Yusheng (Chinese). Aaron, looking for an advantage, chose Morrice's Yusheng; the cooks then had one hour to make a Chinese-themed dish to impress. The two chefs with the worst dishes were both eliminated. Aaron and Nicholas made the two best dishes and were made team captains for the team challenge in the next episode. The bottom three were Joshua, Diana, and Vidhya.; Winners: Aaron and Nicholas; Bottom three: Joshua, Diana and Vidhya; Diana was declared safe, thus eliminating both Joshua and Vidhya.; Eliminated: Joshua and Vidhya
3	"Episode 3"	Catchup	16 September 2018
Team Challenge 1: The eight contestants are split into two teams with the winners of the last challenge, Aaron and Nicholas, assuming the role of team captains. The judges assigned Diana, Gen, and Sharon to join Nicholas on the Red Team, and Sowmiya, Shamsydar, and Zander to join Aaron on the Blue Team. After Nicolas ballots Western for the Red Team, the Blue Team is left to prepare an Asian meal. Each team is then given four hours to prepare at least four dishes in their chosen cuisine for 200 students from the Singapore Sports School. Amongst the 200 students is Calvin Kang, as well as athletes who participated in the Commonwealth Games, Southeast Asian Games and Youth Olympic Games. The students, after tasting each of the menus, cast their votes to decide which team had the best performance, and the team with the most votes would win. The Blue Team wins the challenge with 158 votes cast, beating the Red Team's 43.; Challenge Winners/Immune: Aaron, Sowmiya, Shamsydar, and Zander; Pressure Test 1: The losing cooks are challenged to make a curry meal in 75 minutes. They are allowed to choose any style of curry they want and have access to the full pantry. In addition to their curry dish, their curry must also begin with a starch, and they must also serve a side dish and a drink. At the end of judging, Gen's curry meal was named the best by the judges, sending Diana, Nicholas and Sharon to the Bottom three.; Bottom three: Diana, Nicholas and Sharon; Nicholas was eliminated.; Eliminated: Nicholas
4	"Episode 4"	Catchup	23 September 2018
Mystery Box Challenge 2: The top seven are given 90 minutes to cook a dessert. They have access to the full pantry, and their dessert must incorporate at least one of the eight ingredients found from the Mystery Box (Rock Sugar, Gula Melaka, brown sugar, Honey Rock Sugar, Jaggery, Winter Melon Strips, and Indian Black Rock Sugar). The top three dishes which were selected for tasting were Gen, Zander, and Sowmiya. Zander won the challenge after the judges were impressed on his flourless Chocolate Cake, which was inspired by an Old Fashioned cocktail.; Challenge Winner: Zander; Invention Test 2: The cooks were greeted by Michelin star chef Muhammad Haikal Johari before Zander was taken to the pantry for his advantage. Chef Haikal presented six ingredients, three Asian (satoimo, Thai basil, and tamarind) and three Western (veal sweetbread, lamb ribs, and foie gras). Zander was asked to choose two ingredients, one Asian and one Western. Zander, seeking his own advantage, chose Thai basil and veal sweetbread as Asian and Western ingredients respectively. The cooks have one hour to cook a fusion dish incorporating the two ingredients which selected by Zander. After judging the dishes, the top three dishes were Shamsydar, Zander, and Sharon, with Shamsydar's modern take on Nasi Lemak become the winning dish. The bottom three dishes were Gen, Diana, and Aaron.; Winner: Shamsydar; Bottom three: Gen, Diana and Aaron; The judges chose to eliminate Diana.; Eliminated: Diana
5	"Episode 5"	Catchup	30 September 2018
Team Challenge 2: The top six cooks were greeted in a local Cold Storage supermarket. Shamsydar, Zander, and Sharon, by-virtue of being the top three cooks in the last challenge, were assigned the role of team captains and were given red, green, and yellow aprons, respectively. The remaining three cooks went for a ballot to determine the team pairings – Gen drew the yellow apron, Sowmiya with the red apron, and Aaron with green. Each team was given a budget of S$50 to purchase their ingredients for the cooking part, among the ingredients have to be from the special buys shelves (lamb cutlets, Australian potato, cherry tomatoes, kale and barramundi fish). Teams then have one hour, using only the ingredients purchased from the supermarket to cook a family meal of four (consisting of a main and a dessert), with Morrice's nephew Max and his friend Caden joining in the panel. The green team's take on chilli crab pasta and the five-spice brulee impressed the judges and won the challenge, thus Aaron and Zander were exempt from the Pressure Test.; Challenge Winners/Immune: Aaron and Zander; Pressure Test 2: The four cooks were greeted by chef Ming Tan and were informed that they would be cooking an Asian-style Lobster Bisque. The cooks, without first seeing or tasting the dish, or having a recipe to read, had to follow chef Tan as he cooked the dish and gave instructions. They had to finish their own dishes within ten seconds of chef Tan completing his dish. The cooks with the proper execution of Tan's bisque would pass the challenge. Shamsydar, despite having allergies with seafood, served the best bisque of the challenge.; Bottom three: Gen, Sowmiya and Sharon; Sowmiya's presented the worst bisque, ultimately sending her home.; Eliminated: Sowmiya
6	"Episode 6"	Catchup	7 October 2018
Mystery Box 3: The cooks, with full access to the pantry, are given one hour to make a savoury dish using the mystery ingredient durian. The top three dishes tasted in the challenge were Shamsydar, Zander, and Gen. While all three dishes impressed the judges, Gen's dish of durian polenta croquembouche gave her the win and an advantage in the following elimination challenge.; Challenge Winner: Gen; Elimination Challenge 2: Bjorn Shen presented his "balls" (lamb kibbeh), "belly" (lamb belly), and "squash" (butternut squash noodles) and tasked the top five with recreating all three dishes. After sampling the dishes, the cooks were given two hours, a copy of the recipe, and all the necessary ingredients (the pantry would be closed for this challenge) to complete the task. Gen, being the winner in the Mystery Box challenge, was allowed to call on Chef Bjorn to assist her up to three times, for one minute each time, at any time during the cook.; Aaron's recreation of Shen's dishes fell short of the mark, eliminating him.; Eliminated: Aaron
7	"Episode 7"	Catchup	14 October 2018
Elimination Challenge 3: The final four cooks were blindfolded and were escorted to a 'secret' location (The English House) where they were greeted by Marco Pierre White for the Hell's Kitchen-inspired challenge. White assigned each cook one dish to sample prior to the commencement of the challenge (Shamsydar with Crocustade of Egg Maxim, Gen with Fish and Chips, Sharon with Chicken Pie, and Zander with Baked Custard Tarts); cooks had three hours to work on their dishes assigned by White, and 90 minutes to conduct their dinner service, scheduled to begin on 7pm. The cook with the worst performance for the challenge will be eliminated immediately.; White declared Gen the best performer for the challenge, but he also eliminated Sharon for having the worst dinner service.; Eliminated: Sharon; Challenge Winner: Gen; Elimination Challenge 4: The final three cooks have 90 minutes to cook a dish that will impress the judges to advance to the finals. They have three minutes to access their pantry, thereafter the pantry is closed throughout the remainder of the challenge. However, after gathering the ingredients, the cook's baskets were randomly shuffled by the judges, and the cooks have to use their newly-shuffled baskets to cook their dish. Zander presented his Salak and Portobello Mushroom Green Curry with Lamb, Gluttonous Rice and Thai Omelette, Shamsydar presented her Sous Vide Beef with Satay sauce and Bubur Terigu, and Gen presented her Crispy Ravioli and Dark Chocolate Ganache.; Zander and Gen advanced through to the final, eliminating Shamsydar.; Eliminated: Shamsydar; Note: This episode was broadcast on the 10.00pm time slot (which was pre-empted by the news broadcast) due to the broadcast of President's Star Charity 2018.
8	"Season Finale"	Catchup	21 October 2018
Season Finale: Singapore's two best home cooks, Gen and Zander, had to prepare a five-dish Asian-style course in 2.5 hours: a meat dish, a fish dish, a vegetable dish, a starch dish and a dessert.; Meat: Gen served Duck Confit with seared Duck Breast and candied Oranges, while Zander served Flank steak with Asian Chimichurri.; Fish: Gen served Clam Mornay, while Zander served Pan-seared Snapper with Lemongrass Beurre blanc.; Vegetables: Gen served roasted eggplants with Sichuan peppercorn sauce, while Zander served shaved Fennel salad with soy and honey.; Starch: Gen served Herb Quinoa salad, while Zander served Fettuccine Carbonara with Sichuan peppercorns.; Dessert: Gen served a Red Wine Fig Mochi with Ice Cream and Walnuts, while Zander served Ondeh-ondeh Panna cotta with Gula Melaka Sponge Cake.; Final Two: Gen and Zander; Winner Revealed: Zander Ng was named the first-ever MasterChef Singapore winner and won a $100,000 prize package, which include a cookbook deal, kitchen appliances, a trophy and a three-month internship with Bjorn Shen in Artichoke and Damian D’Silva in Folklore.; MasterChef Winner: Zander Ng
