= MasterChef Singapore season 4 =

MasterChef Singapore
- Season 4
- No. of episodes: 10

Release
- Original network: Mediacorp Channel 5
- Original release: 9 August – 15 October 2023

Season chronology
- ← Previous; Season 3

The fourth season of MasterChef Singapore began airing on 9 August 2023 and ended on 15 October 2023 on Mediacorp Channel 5.

This season introduced a new format to the show, as the three judges each selected four contestants to give aprons to. Then, the judges mentored their respective contestants throughout the competition.

The winner of this season was Inderpal Singh, with Tina Amin as the runner-up and Mandy Kee as the finalist.

== Top 12 ==
Source for names, hometowns, and ages. Occupations and nicknames as given on air or stated in cites.

Contestant	Age	Occupation	Mentor	Status
Inderpal Singh	33	Home-Based Cook	Audra	Winner 15 October
Tina Amin	42	Admin Officer	Audra	Runner-up 15 October
Mandy Kee	41	Sales Advisor	Audra	Eliminated 15 October
Aameer Ailmchandani	24	Spice Mixer	Damian	Eliminated 8 October
Divya Tolath	31	Business Strategist	Bjorn	Eliminated 1 October
Reuben Wong	30	Pharmacist	Damian	Eliminated 1 October
Aizat Haikal Saini	33	Former Flight Attendant	Damian	Eliminated 24 September
Jonathan Ng	37	Shipbroker	Bjorn	Eliminated 24 September
Louise Yuan	43	Marketing Manager	Audra	Eliminated 11 September
Amanda Chia	23	Law Graduate	Damian	Eliminated 28 August
Aretha Law	24	Aerospace Engineer	Bjorn	Eliminated 20 August
Saza Faradilla	27	Students Services	Bjorn	Eliminated 13 August

== Elimination table ==
Place	Contestant	Episode															
Place	Contestant	2		3	4		5		6		7		8		9		10
1	Inderpal	WIN	IMM	PT	IN	IN	HIGH	IMM	LOW	HIGH	IN	IN	IN	WIN	HIGH	WIN	WINNER
2	Tina	HIGH	WIN	IN	IN	LOW	WIN	IN	IN	IN	IN	HIGH	IN	IN	WIN	IMM	RUNNER-UP
3	Mandy	HIGH	LOW	IN	IN	WIN	HIGH	IMM	IN	HIGH	WIN	WIN	IN	WIN	IN	LOW	ELIM
4	Aameer	WIN	IMM	WIN	WIN	IMM	WIN	IN	LOW	HIGH	IN	IN	WIN	IN	IN	ELIM	
5	Divya	IN	IN	PT	IN	IN	WIN	IN	LOW	HIGH	IN	IN	IN	ELIM			
5	Reuben	IN	IN	WIN	WIN	IMM	IN	IMM	IN	WIN	IN	IN	HIGH	ELIM			
7	Aizat	WIN	IMM	WIN	WIN	IMM	IN	IMM	IN	LOW	IN	ELIM					
7	Jonathan	WIN	IMM	LOW	WIN	IMM	IN	IMM	WIN	IN	IN	ELIM					
9	Louise	WIN	IMM	IN	IN	IN	WIN	WIN	IN	ELIM							
10	Amanda	IN	LOW	WPT	IN	ELIM											
11	Aretha	WIN	IMM	ELIM													
12	Saza	IN	ELIM														

(WINNER) This cook won the competition.
(RUNNER-UP) This cook finished as a runner-up in the finals.
(WIN) The cook won the individual challenge (Mystery Box Challenge, Skills Test, Pressure Test, or Elimination Test).
(IMM) The cook was selected by Mystery Box Challenge winner and didn't have to compete in the Elimination Test.
(WIN) The cook was on the winning team in the Team Challenge.
(HIGH) The cook was one of the top entries in the individual challenge but didn't win.
(IN) The cook wasn't selected as a top or bottom entry in an individual challenge.
(IN) The cook wasn't selected as a top or bottom entry in a team challenge.
(IMM) The cook didn't have to compete in that round of the competition and was safe from elimination.
(IMM) The cook was selected by Mystery Box Challenge winner and didn't have to compete in the Elimination Test.
(RET) The cook won the Reinstation Challenge and returned to the competition.
(PT) The cook was on the losing team in the Team Challenge, competed in the Pressure Test, and advanced.
(NPT) The cook was on the losing team in the Team Challenge, did not compete in the Pressure Test, and advanced.
(WPT) The cook was on the winning team in the Team Challenge, but still competed in the Pressure Challenge, and advanced.
(LOW) The cook was one of the bottom entries in an individual challenge or Pressure Test, but advanced.
(LOW) The cook was one of the bottom entries in the Team Challenge, but advanced.
(ELIM) The cook was eliminated from MasterChef.

=== Guest judges ===
- Sashi Cheliah - Episode 2
- Fiona Ting from Mr. Bucket Chocolaterie - Episode 3
- Fariz Ramli from Revolver - Episode 5
- Alicia Wong from Nesuto & Co - Episode 6
- Isaac Henry from 67 Pall Mall, Malcolm Lee from Pangium - Episode 8
- Emmanuel Stroobant from V-ZUG - Episode 9
