= Guillaume Brahimi =

French chef in Australia

Guillaume Brahimi (born 11 August 1967 in Paris, France) is a French-born chef based in Sydney, Australia. He is currently head chef of Bistro Guillaume Sydney.

== Career ==
French-born Guillaume Brahimi is one of Australia's most popular and acclaimed chefs. He trained under Michelin-starred chef Joël Robuchon in Paris before moving to Sydney in the 1990s.

Brahimi accepted an offer to captain the restaurant Bilson's (later renamed Quay) at Sydney's Circular Quay. Between 1995 and 1996, Brahimi lifted the restaurant from its mediocre stature to Two Hat status. By 1998 the restaurant had earned Three Hats from the Australian Good Food Guide, joining the ranks of the few elite Sydney restaurants to earn this accolade each year.

In 2001, Brahimi secured the contract to run the Bennelong restaurant at the Sydney Opera House. The restaurant underwent extensive refurbishment and opened later that year, renamed Guillaume at Bennelong, awarded by Condé Nast Traveler and Gourmet Traveller. The restaurant was also awarded Two Hats in the 2004 and 2005 editions of The Sydney Morning Herald's Good Food Guide, and eventually Three Hats in 2006 and 2007. The restaurant fell back to Two Hat status in 2008 before regaining Three Hats during 2013, awarded in the 2014 Guide. The restaurant closed at the end of 2013 having lost the contract to run the venue.

In 2008, Brahimi launched Bistro Guillaume at Melbourne's Crown Casino. The restaurant is styled on the classic French bistro, and serves traditional bistro fare.

In 2009, Brahimi published his first book, Guillaume: Food for Friends, the proceeds being donated to a cancer research organisation named after a late friend, the Chris O'Brien LifeHouse at the Royal Prince Alfred Hospital in Sydney. His second book, French Food Safari, was co-authored with Maeve O'Mara in 2012. The book was made into a television series on SBS. In 2015 he published Guillaume: Food for Family, in which he shared his own family's favourite recipes. Royalties from that book were donated to the National Breast Cancer Foundation.

In 2012 Brahimi launched Bistro Guillaume at Crown Perth. The restaurant is also styled in the same vein as the Crown Casino in Melbourne.

In December 2013, Brahimi was a crew member aboard racing supermaxi yacht Perpetual Loyal in the 2013 Sydney to Hobart Yacht Race, with his other celebrity crew members, Karl Stefanovic, Larry Emdur, Tom Slingsby, Phil Waugh and Jude Bolton.

In 2014 Brahimi opened Guillaume in Paddington, Sydney, following the closure of Guillaume at Bennelong.

In November 2014, Brahimi received the Chevalier de l'Ordre National du Merite (Knight of the National Order of Merit) from the French government.

In 2016, Brahimi launched Bistro Guillaume Sydney.

In January 2021 Brahimi was appointed by Crown Sydney as its culinary ambassador helping to promote its dining precinct and the city more broadly as a food destination.

Brahimi is the host of SBS's food series, Plat du Tour which airs during the coverage of the Tour de France. Brahimi takes viewers on a tour of great French cooking during the 21 recipes that originate from different regions of France and correlate to the different Tour de France stages.

Brahimi has written food columns and articles for The Sydney Morning Herald and other publications. He is also actively involved in a number of charities, having hosted several charity events at his restaurant over the years. Outside of life in the food industry, Brahimi is known to be an avid rugby fan, and a keen supporter of the French National Rugby Team.

== Food ==
Brahimi's food has been described as "contemporary Australian cuisine with French influences". His dishes seek to celebrate Australian produce, articulated in modern style through French technique. The dishes might range from his signature East-meets-West entrée, basil infused tuna with mustard seed and soy vinaigrette, to Italian-inspired roasted marron wrapped in prosciutto with risotto, veal jus and truffle, to dishes closer to the classical French repertoire such as his duck confit with pommes Pont Neuf, foie gras and truffle.

== Television ==
Brahimi has been an in-house chef on the Australian version of Iron Chef on Channel Seven, specialising in French cooking. He has also been featured as one of the presenters of French Food Safari alongside Maeve O'Meara on the SBS Australia Network, and has appeared as a guest on both MasterChef Australia and Junior MasterChef Australia. In the fourth series of MasterChef Australia in 2012, the last six contestants worked under him for one day at his restaurant Guillaume at Bennelong, cooking a meal for 60 people as part of the competition.

In 2020, Brahimi took over from Gabriel Gaté as host of a French gastronomy show during the broadcast of the Tour de France on SBS, renamed from Taste Le Tour to Plat du Tour. Brahimi's show is different in that he explores local Australian produce alongside French fare related to the town of each stage location, whereas Gaté would physically visit each stage location to explore local food and wine.

== Charity work ==
Brahimi is a supporter of the Bestest Foundation and its Gala Dinner. Bestest raises funds for children who fall outside the standard boundaries of the larger established charities and helps get these children support to battle an illness, obtain equipment for disabilities, gain access to education or provide urgent assistance to children at risk. All funds raised go directly to children in need. In 2008, more than 50 chefs from Australia's best restaurants participated with teams from Matt Moran (Aria), Neil Perry (Rockpool), Philip Johnson (E'cco), Shannon Bennett (Vue de Monde) and Scott Hallsworth (Nobu).

== See also ==
- French Australians
