= Kumar Mahadevan =

Indian chef

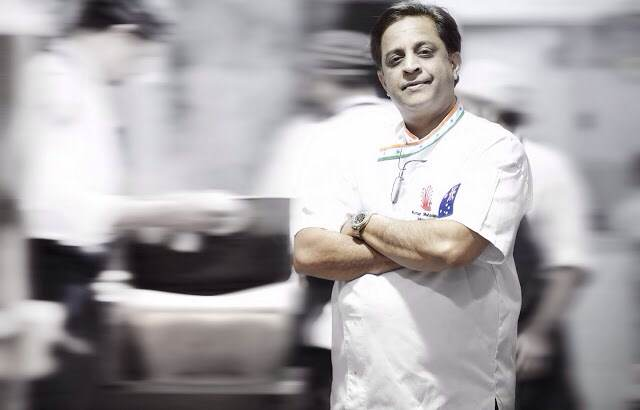
- Born: 23 November 1959 (age 66); Tirunelveli, Tamil Nadu, India
- Education: Madras Catering College
- Spouse: Suba Mahadevan (m. 1987)
- Children: 2
- Culinary career
- Cooking style: Contemporary South Indian cuisine
- Ratings
- Abhi's awarded 1 Chef's Hat by The Sydney Morning Herald Good Food Guide in 1995, 1996 & 1997. Aki's awarded 1 Chef's Hat by The Sydney Morning Herald Good Food Guide in 2011, 2012, 2013,2014,2015,2017.
- Current restaurants
- Abhi's; Aki's
- Website: akisindian.com.au www.abhisindian.com.au

Kumar Mahadevan (born 23 November 1959) is an Indian chef, restaurateur and media personality based in Australia. He has been referred to in Sydney's dining circles as the "Guru of Indian cuisine". He is recognized for introducing authentic Indian cuisine to the Australian public with his restaurant, Abhi's, in 1990. Following the success of Abhi's he opened his second restaurant, Aki's, at Sydney's prestigious dining precinct 'The Finger Wharf Woolloomooloo'. Aki's carried the accolades for Chef Kumar, being the only Indian restaurant to win the coveted 'Chef Hat' award for consecutive years since 2011 till present.

== Early life ==
Kumar Mahadevan was raised in Tirunelveli, a town in the South Indian state of Tamil Nadu. He was brought up in a typical Hindu Brahmin joint family, consisting of his grandmother, her three sons, their wives and children. His father was a steel merchant.

== Training and early cooking career ==
Kumar Mahadevan started an economics degree at the University of Madras at the age of 16, but dropped out a month later, when his family's fortunes fell. He then joined Madras Catering College, on the suggestion of a friend. Though granted a full scholarship for the three-year course, Kumar struggled to convince his parents as they expected him to pursue an academic discipline.

At the end of his first year, Kumar got a summer job at the five-star The Taj Mahal Palace Hotel in Mumbai. Kumar signed up for double and triple shifts, working for eighteen days consecutively, while commuting from his aunt's place, an hour and a half away. Starting out in butchery, he continued to work in every department under Cyrus Todiwala, a Parsi chef who now runs London's Cafe Spice Namaste. He graduated in 1979.

Kumar went back for his apprenticeship at the Taj, completing it in half the time. In 1981, when offered a higher salary, Kumar left for Basrah in Iraq, to work at the new Sheraton. With the Iran-Iraq war worsening and having helped to settle his father's debts, he returned to Mumbai in 1984.

== Career ==
Kumar went to Australia in 1985, to work in a joint venture by The Tea Board of India and Air India – the Mayur restaurant in Sydney, cooking for the likes of Elton John, Mick Jagger and the King of Bahrain. He worked 96-hour weeks over six days for meagre pay and had signed a four-year contract, with a clause that stated that if he left, his parents will have to pay a huge fine.

Kumar got married in July 1987, and his wife followed him to Sydney. But, the long hours and the low wages started to take a toll on Kumar, and he was desperate to leave. He came close to walking out in 1988, when he was forced to return to the kitchen within hours of his son's birth. Luck intervened, when Mayur's finances fell and Kumar was suddenly freed from his contract.

Kumar joined Sorrentino cafe in Sydney's Circular Quay in 1989. He became friends with the owner, Doug Moxon and they decided to open an Indian restaurant together. They found a place in North Strathfield and in 1990, Abhi's, named after his first son Abhinav, opened. In 1991, his second son Akilesh was born. In spite of receiving good feedback, Kumar and his wife struggled to make ends meet for the next few years.

== Success ==
In 1994, Les Luxford, the food critic at The Sydney Morning Herald went to Abhi's and published a review with the headline "The Search is Over" in April 1994. Abhi's then went on to become a neighbourhood eatery and culinary institution of Indian Gastronomy.

His other restaurant, Aki's, was opened in November 2003 on the recently restored Woolloomooloo Finger Wharf. Kumar enjoys creating dishes that combine flavours of South India with seafood and other produce of Australia.

== Awards ==
- Abhi's - 1 Chef's Hat in The Sydney Morning Herald Good Food Guide in 1995, 1996 and 1997. First Indian restaurant to receive this accolade
- Aki's - 1 Chef's Hat in The Sydney Morning Herald Good Food Guide in 2011, 2012, 2013. 2014, 2015, 2017, thus joining its sister restaurant in completing a hat-trick of Chef's Hats.
- Ambassador for Indian Cuisine for the inaugural Sydney International Food Festival (SIFF). Kumar was chosen by Joanna Savill, Director of SIFF, to represent the flavours and colours of Indian cuisine in the culinary event.
- Aki's - Best Indian/Sub Continental Restaurant 2011, 2012, 2013, 2014, 2016, 2017 by the Restaurant and Catering Association of NSW (RCA)
- Aki's - Best Indian Restaurant 2015 by the India Australia Business & Community Awards (IABCA).
- Aki's - 2 Hat from the Gault&Millau Awards 2015, 2016

== Television appearances ==
Kumar Mahadevan has had several national TV appearances on prime-time shows.

- MasterChef Australia (series 2) for an Indian Masterclass showcasing a South Indian dish – Eral Vendakkai Kuzhambu (Prawn Okra Curry) in MasterClass 4.
- MasterChef Junior Australia as a judge for the Indian challenge.
- MasterChef Australia (series 4) in Offsite Challenge 6 – the Sri Lankan Hindu wedding challenge, where he had to mentor the Red and Blue teams in their task to cook a traditional wedding banquet for 450 guests.
- SBS Food Safari with celebrity host Maeve O'Meara - Abhi's 2014
- SBS Food Safari Fire with celebrity host Maeve O'Meara - Abhi's & Aki's 2017 - 'Episode 5: The tandoor' with celebrity host Maeve O'Meara

== Personal life ==
In July 1987, Kumar Mahadevan married Suba Krishnamurthi, a commerce graduate from Chennai. He refers to her as his greatest inspiration and at times, his greatest critic. Since the success of Abhi's in 1994, she has helped Kumar with the running of both the restaurants.

They have two sons Abhinav (born 1988) and Akilesh (born 1991), after whom Kumar named both his restaurants. His other passions are photography, wine and travel. Every year, the couple visit their native place for inspiration.

== Books ==
In 2013, Kumar and Suba Mahadevan co-authored a book titled From India: food, family & tradition. The book presents traditional and modern recipes alongside their personal story of arranged marriage, international adventures and their ultimate move to Australia. Recipes are arranged according to the tastes – ‘sour’, ‘sweet’, ‘salt’, ‘bitter’ and ‘spice’, perhaps a nod to the Vedic concept of six tastes.

Awards:

- British Book Design & Production Awards 2013 in the 'lifestyle' category. The book has become an international
- Frankfurt International Book Festival 2014 - Silver Medal
