= MasterChef Australia series 4 =

MasterChef Australia
- Season 4
- Judges: Matt Preston; George Calombaris; Gary Mehigan
- No. of contestants: 24
- Winner: Andy Allen
- Runner-up: Julia Taylor
- No. of episodes: 70

Release
- Original network: Network Ten
- Original release: 6 May – 25 July 2012

Series chronology
- ← Previous; Series 3 Next → Series 5

The fourth series of the Australian cooking game show MasterChef Australia premiered on Sunday, 6 May 2012 at 7.30pm on Network Ten. Judges George Calombaris, Gary Mehigan and Matt Preston returned from the previous series. After the first week in Melbourne, the competition took the contestants to places nationally, such as Kangaroo Island and Tasmania, as well as the international destination, Italy. It also featured a number of guest chefs, including Jamie Oliver, Rick Stein and Buddy Valastro.

The fourth series was won by Andy Allen who defeated Julia Taylor and Audra Morrice in the grand finale on 25 July 2012. Andy would later go on to be a judge on the show himself from series 12 onwards.

== Changes ==
For the first time, the initial Top 50 portion of the show took place in and around Melbourne, Victoria. Contestants faced challenges at the Royal Exhibition Building and the South Melbourne Market, and visited Red Hill on the Mornington Peninsula, the Lake House in Daylesford, and Montsalvat in Eltham.

Sunday night challenges returned to the more traditional Mystery Box/Invention Test combination used in the first two series.

After featuring a range of challengers in Series 3 such as contestants and apprentices, Immunity Challenges now typically featured guest chefs (along with a team of helpers) facing off against the chosen contestant plus their choice of two contestant helpers. Both the contestant team and challenging team had to prepare three courses using a core ingredient provided, with the contestants gaining a time advantage (ninety minutes to sixty, for example). Matt Moran acted as a mentor to the contestant team.

There was no Second Chance Cook Off this season, so eliminated contestants had no chance to return.

The Grand Finale featured three finalists instead of two.

== Contestants ==
=== Top 24 ===
After a series of auditions and challenges, the winner was determined on 25 July 2012.

Contestant	Age	State	Occupation	Status
Andy Allen	24	NSW	Electrician	Winner 25 July
Julia Taylor	26	QLD	Legal Secretary	Runner-up 25 July
Audra Morrice	41	NSW	Account Manager	Third place 25 July
Mindy Woods	30	QLD	Physiotherapist	Eliminated 24 July
Ben Milbourne	30	TAS	Secondary School Teacher	Eliminated 23 July
Kylie Millar	24	NSW	Masters Student	Eliminated 22 July
Alice Zaslavsky	26	VIC	Secondary School Teacher	Eliminated 19 July
Beau Cook	27	VIC	Construction Worker	Eliminated 17 July
Wade Drummond	28	WA	Commercial Labourer	Eliminated 16 July
Debra Sederlan	50	VIC	Senior Account Manager	Eliminated 12 July
Amina Elshafei	27	NSW	Paediatric Nurse	Eliminated 5 July
Julia "Jules" Pike	28	NT	Customer Service Officer	Eliminated 5 July
Andrew Strickland	48	NSW	Hairdresser	Eliminated 2 July
Tregan Borg	25	VIC	Social Worker	Eliminated 28 June
Sam Davis	34	WA	Private Banker	Eliminated 25 June
Emma O'Shaughnessy	19	SA	Former Student	Eliminated 21 June
Filippo Silvestro	38	QLD	Financial Planner	Eliminated 18 June
Mario Mohorko	40	VIC	Automotive Detailer	Eliminated 14 June
Dalvinder Dhami	35	NSW	Public Servant	Eliminated 11 June
Tran Kim "TK" Nguyen	22	VIC	Law Student	Eliminated 31 May
Kath von Witt	38	NSW	Art Gallery Director	Eliminated 28 May
Matt Howell	18	VIC	Uni Student	Eliminated 24 May
Lydia Guerrini	38	WA	PhD Student	Eliminated 21 May
Kevin Perry	34	NSW	Casino Marketer	Eliminated 17 May

=== Future appearances ===
- In the Special All Stars Series Andy Allen, Julia Taylor, Ben Milbourne and Amina Elshafi appeared for the seafood challenge to help the final 4 for which Julia helped contestant Kate Bracks to win.
- In series 5 Kylie Miller appeared as a guest Judge for an elimination challenge, Ben appeared as a guest for Masterclass and Andy also appeared on Masterclass as well as the Grand Final.
- In series 6 Andy appeared as a Guest Judge for a Mystery Box and Invention Test Challenge.
- In a superstar themed week in series 7 Kylie appeared as a guest chef to set a pressure test, while Andy and Ben appeared as team captains for a team challenge.
- Audra Morrice appeared as one of the main judges for MasterChef Asia.
- Kylie also appeared on series 9 as guest judge for another pressure test.
- Andy appeared at the Auditions in series 10 to support the top 50. While Ben appeared at the Semi Finals round as a guest along with Alice Zaslavsky & Beau Cook.
- Audra is currently one of the Main Judges for MasterChef Singapore.
- In series 11 Andy appeared as a guest chef to compete against contestant Sandeep Pandit, was ultimately lost to Sandeep's perfect score.
- Andy (as a judge), Ben and Amina appeared on series 12. Ben was eliminated on 26 April 2020, finishing 22nd and Amina was eliminated on 12 May 2020, finishing 17th.
- In series 14 Mindy Woods appeared for another chance to win the title. Mindy was eliminated on 28 June 2022, finishing 7th.
- In series 16 Mindy & Beau appeared as guests for the 1st service challenge.
- Audra & Beau appeared on Series 17. Beau was eliminated on 22 June 2025, finishing 13th and Audra was eliminated on 6 July 2025, finishing 9th.

=== Audra's prior cooking experience ===
Australian newspaper The Sunday Telegraph reported that contestant Audra Morrice, whose occupation is listed as "account manager", actually owns a catering company called Audra's Gourmet Kitchen. The rules for the 2012 series, however, clearly state that contestants cannot have had any professional cooking experience, be it in a restaurant, catering, hotels or cookery education. The rules also exclude contestants who have done food preparation on a 'casual' or 'part-time' basis. The only exemptions to these clauses are reserved for those who have either worked in food service, or for very rudimentary food preparation such as sandwich making and fast food restaurants. A producer from Shine Australia has told The Telegraph: "Audra was upfront with producers regarding Audra’s Gourmet Kitchen. Her full-time employment was as a senior account manager with AAPT and this was a home-based hobby reserved for family and friends."

Years after competed in this series, Morrice would later take the role as judge in MasterChef Asia & MasterChef Singapore.

== Guest Chefs ==
- Shannon Bennett - Top 50: Part 4, Finals Week Elimination 3
- Jacques Reymond - Top 50: Part 5, Finals Week Elimination 3
- Dan Hong - Immunity Challenge 1
- Phillipa Grogan - MasterClass 2
- Peter Gilmore - Pressure Test 1
- Darren Robertson - Immunity Challenge 2
- Maggie Beer - Pressure Test 2
- Buddy Valastro - Pressure Test 2
- Shaun Presland - Immunity Challenge 3
- Jason Jones - MasterClass 4
- Philippe Leban - Immunity Challenge 4
- Rick Stein - Sunday Challenge 4
- Lorraine Pascale - MasterClass 5
- Jamie Oliver - Immunity Challenge 5
- Julie Goodwin - Sunday Challenge 5
- Adam Liaw - Sunday Challenge 5
- Kate Bracks - Sunday Challenge 5
- Hamish Ingham - Immunity Challenge 6
- Kumar Mahadevan - Offsite Challenge 6
- Christine Manfield - Pressure Test 5, Grand Finale
- Daniel Wilson - Immunity Challenge 7
- Heston Blumenthal - Sunday Challenge 7
- Vincent Gadan - Pressure Test 6, Offsite Challenge 9
- Tomislav Martinovic - Immunity Challenge 8
- Marco Pierre White - Elimination Challenge 8
- Massimo Bottura - Sunday Challenge 8
- Antonio Carluccio - Immunity Challenge 9
- Gualtiero Marchesi - Italy Team Challenge
- Neil Perry - MasterClass 10
- Massimo Spigaroli - MasterClass 10
- Grant King - Pressure Test 7
- Kylie Kwong - Elimination Challenge 10
- Adriano Zumbo - Offsite Challenge 9
- Kirsten Tibbles - Offsite Challenge 9
- Dean Gibson - Offsite Challenge 9
- Darren Purchese - Offsite Challenge 9
- Alistair Wise - Offsite Challenge 9
- Philippa Sibley - Offsite Challenge 9
- Guillaume Brahimi - Finals Week Elimination 1
- John Torode - Finals Week Elimination 2
- Mark Best - Finals Week Elimination 3
- Peter Doyle - Finals Week Elimination 3

== Elimination chart ==
No.	Week	2			3		4		5			6		7		8		9		10		11			Finals			
No.	Mystery Box Challenge Winner	Ben			Filippo		Julia		Dalvinder			Kylie		Audra		Wade		None		None		Andy			None			
No.	Invention Test Winner	None			Mindy		Mindy		Sam			Alice; Jules; Tregan		None		Tregan		Kylie		None		Mindy			None			
No.	Immunity Challenge	Lose: Ben (Andy, Emma)			Lose: Mindy (Amina, Julia)		Win: Mindy (Amina, Audra)		Lose: Amina			Lose: Alice; Jules; Tregan		Lose: Audra (Amina, Kylie)		Lose: Tregan (Jules, Julia)		Win: Kylie (Mindy)		Win: Alice		None			None			
1	Andy	Top 24	IN	Team Win	IN	Team Lose	IN	Team Win	IN	Team 3rd	Btm 2	IN	Team Win	IN	Team Win	IN	Team Lose	IN	Btm 3	IN	Team Lose	IN	IN	Team Lose	Top 3	Top 3	WIN	WINNER
2	Julia	Top 24	IN	Team Win	IN	Team Lose	Btm 3	Btm 2	IN	Team 2nd	Team Win	IN	Btm 2	IN	Team Win	Top 3	Btm 3	Top 3	Team Win	Top 4	Btm 2	Top 3	Btm 3	Btm 2	Top 3	Btm 2	Btm 3	Runner-up
3	Audra	Top 24	IN	Team Win	IN	Team Win	IN	Team Win	IN	Team 2nd	Team Win	Btm 3	Team Win	S.C. Winner	Team Win	IN	ADV	IN	Team Lose	IN	Team Win	IN	Btm 3	ADV	Btm 3	Top 3	Btm 2	Third-place
4	Mindy	Top 24	IN	Team Lose	S.C. Winner	Team Lose	S.C. Winner	Team Win	IN	Team 1st	Team Win	IN	Team Win	Top 4	Team Win	IN	Team Lose	IN	Team Win	Top 4	Team Win	S.C. Winner	Imm.	Team Lose	Btm 3	Top 3	Elim	Eliminated (Ep 69)
5	Ben	Top 24	S.C. Winner	Team Lose	IN	Team Win	IN	Team Win	IN	Team 1st	Team Lose	IN	Team Win	IN	Btm 2	IN	ADV	IN	Team Win	IN	Team Lose	Btm 3	IN	Team Win	Top 3	Elim	Eliminated (Ep 68)	
6	Kylie	Top 24	IN	Team Lose	IN	Team Win	IN	Team Win	IN	Team 1st	Team Lose	IN	Team Lose	IN	Team Lose	Top 3	Team Win	S.C. Winner	Team Win	IN	Team Win	Top 3	Imm.	Team Win	Elim	Eliminated (Ep 67)		
7	Alice	Top 24	IN	Team Win	IN	Team Lose	Top 3	Team Lose	IN	Team 2nd	Team Win	S.C. Winner	Team Win	IN	Team Win	IN	Team Lose	IN	Team Win	Top 4	Team Lose	Btm 3	Imm.	Elim	Eliminated (Ep 65)			
8	Beau	Top 24	IN	Team Lose	IN	Team Win	IN	Team Win	IN	Team 4th	Team Win	IN	Team Win	IN	Team Lose	IN	Team Win	Btm 3	Team Win	IN	Team Win	Btm 4	Elim	Eliminated (Ep 63)				
9	Wade	Top 24	IN	Team Lose	Btm 3	Team Win	IN	Team Win	IN	Team 4th	Team Win	IN	Team Win	Btm 3	Team Lose	IN	Team Win	IN	Team Lose	Top 4	Team Win	Elim	Eliminated (Ep 62)					
10	Debra	Top 24	Top 3	Team Win	Top 4	Team Lose	IN	Team Lose	IN	Team 2nd	Team Win	IN	Team Lose	Top 4	Team Lose	IN	Team Lose	IN	Team Lose	IN	Elim	Eliminated (Ep 59)						
11	Amina	Top 24	IN	Team Win	IN	Team Lose	IN	Team Lose	IN	Team 1st	Team Win	IN	Team Lose	IN	Team Lose	Btm 3	Team Lose	Btm 3	Elim	Eliminated (Ep 53)								
11	Jules	Top 24	IN	Btm 2	IN	Team Win	IN	Team Lose	IN	Team 4th	Team Lose	S.C. Winner	Team Win	IN	Team Win	IN	Btm 3	Top 3	Elim	Eliminated (Ep 53)								
13	Andrew	Top 24	IN	Team Win	IN	Team Lose	Btm 3	Team Lose	IN	Team 3rd	Team Lose	Btm 3	Team Win	Top 4	Team Win	Btm 3	Team Win	Elim	Eliminated (Ep 50)									
14	Tregan	Top 24	IN	Team Win	IN	Team Win	IN	Team Lose	Top 3	Team 4th	Team Lose	S.C. Winner	Team Lose	IN	Team Lose	S.C. Winner	Elim	Eliminated (Ep 47)										
15	Sam	Top 24	IN	Team Win	IN	Team Win	IN	Team Win	S.C. Winner	Team 1st	Btm 2	IN	Team Lose	IN	Team Win	Elim	Eliminated (Ep 44)											
16	Emma	Top 24	Top 3	Team Lose	IN	Team Lose	IN	Team Win	IN	Team 4th	Team Lose	IN	Team Lose	Btm 3	Elim	Eliminated (Ep 41)												
17	Filippo	Top 24	IN	Team Lose	Top 4	Btm 2	IN	Team Win	Top 3	Team 3rd	Team Win	IN	Team Lose	Elim	Eliminated (Ep 38)													
18	Mario	Top 24	IN	Team Win	IN	Team Win	IN	Team Lose	IN	Team 3rd	Team Win	IN	Elim	Eliminated (Ep 35)														
19	Dalvinder	Top 24	IN	Team Lose	Top 4	Team Win	Top 3	Team Lose	IN	Team 3rd	Team Lose	Elim	Eliminated (Ep 32)															
20	TK	Top 24	IN	Team Lose	Btm 3	Team Lose	IN	Elim	Eliminated (Ep 23)																			
21	Kath	Top 24	IN	Team Win	IN	Team Win	Elim	Eliminated (Ep 20)																				
22	Matt	Top 24	IN	Team Lose	IN	Elim	Eliminated (Ep 17)																					
23	Lydia	Top 24	IN	Team Win	Elim	Eliminated (Ep 14)																						
24	Kevin	Top 24	IN	Elim	Eliminated (Ep 11)																							
	Notes	^{See note 1}	^{See note 2}	None	None	None	None	None	^{See note 2}	^{See note 3}	^{See note 4}	^{See note 5}	None	^{See note 6}	None	None	^{See note 7}	^{See note 8}	^{See note 9}	^{See note 10}		None	^{See note 11}	^{See note 12}	^{See note 13}			^{See note 14}
	Eliminated	None		Kevin	Lydia	Matt	Kath	TK	None			Dalvinder	Mario	Filippo	Emma	Sam	Tregan	Andrew	Amina; Jules	Debra		Wade	Beau	Alice	Kylie	Ben	Mindy	Audra; 22 points (out of 30)
	Eliminated	None		Kevin	Lydia	Matt	Kath	TK	None			Dalvinder	Mario	Filippo	Emma	Sam	Tregan	Andrew	Amina; Jules	Debra		Wade	Beau	Alice	Kylie	Ben	Mindy	Julia; 68 points (out of 90)
	Eliminated	None		Kevin	Lydia	Matt	Kath	TK	None			Dalvinder	Mario	Filippo	Emma	Sam	Tregan	Andrew	Amina; Jules	Debra		Wade	Beau	Alice	Kylie	Ben	Mindy	Andy; 76 points to win

- ^1 In Week 1, through a series of auditions and Top 50 challenges the judges selected the top twenty-four contestants.
- ^2 In Weeks 2 and 5, there was no Bottom 3 for the Sunday Challenge.
- ^3 In Week 5 (Tasmania Week), Monday's challenge was a 4-Team Challenge. The losing team did not face elimination. The winning team competed for a spot in the Immunity Challenge.
- ^4 In Week 5 (Tasmania Week), the final round of the Elimination Challenge was a draw, and therefore neither contestant was eliminated.
- ^5 In Week 6, contestants were grouped in threes for the Invention Test; the winning team all competed in the Immunity challenge, while the losing team all fell into a Pressure Test.
- ^6 In Week 7, there was no Invention Test; the Mystery Box Challenge decided the Top and Bottom contestants.
- ^7 In Week 8, Audra and Ben won an individual challenge and did not take part in the Team Challenge. The Team Challenge featured three teams of 4, with the worst two teams facing the Elimination Challenge.
- ^8 In Week 9, there was no Mystery Box Challenge.
- ^9 In Week 9, the Elimination Challenge was a double elimination.
- ^10 In Week 10 (Italy Week), Sunday's challenge was a 5-Team Challenge. There was no losing team. The winning team members competed for a spot in the Immunity Challenge.
- ^11 In Semi-Final Week, Mindy, Kylie and Alice used their immunity pins to avoid the Elimination Challenge.
- ^12 In Semi-Final Week, Audra won an individual challenge and did not take part in the Team Challenge. Contestants were paired up for the Team Challenge with the winning team escaping elimination.
- ^13 In Finals Week, Sunday, Monday and Tuesday featured elimination challenges.
- ^14 In the Finale, the first round was an elimination round. Audra scored the fewest points and became the Third Place finisher.

== Episodes and Ratings ==
Ep#/Wk-Ep#	Original airdate	Episode Title / Event	Total viewers (5 Metro Cities)	Nightly Ranking	Weekly Ranking
Week 1
1/01-1	Sunday 6 May 2012	Series Premiere: Auditions - Hundreds of hopeful contestants competed for a place in the Top 50. They each had an hour (plus an additional five minutes in front of the judges of final cooking and presentation) to prepare a dish of their choice, with a number securing their place in the next stage of the competition.	1,368,000	4th	7th
2/01-2	Monday 7 May 2012	Top 50: Part 1 - After completing the audition round, the Top 50 contestants faced a Mystery Box challenge at the Royal Exhibition Building. With half given chicken and the other half beef, contestants had 90 minutes to create a dish using any cut of their given meat. Kevin's Cider Can Chicken was the dish of the day, giving him automatic entry into the Top 24, while the twelve contestants who impressed the judges the most moved on to challenge for six Top 24 spots.	996,000	9th	28th
3/01-3	Tuesday 8 May 2012	Top 50: Part 2 - The top 12 performers from the Mystery Box challenge had six hours to travel to the Mornington Peninsula, collect their choice of ingredients and prepare a dish that showed off the fresh produce of the region. Contestants struggled with organisation and timing, some forgetting ingredients, others getting lost, leading many to change their dish last minute. In the end, Audra, Amina, Andrew, Jules, TK and Dalvinder impressed the most and won their place in the Top 24.	1,078,000	11th	22nd
4/01-4	Wednesday 9 May 2012	Top 50: Part 3 - The remaining contestants were given the choice to compete for one of five spots in the Top 24, with elimination as the result should they fail. In a challenge set by Matt Moran, the ten contestants had to fillet and bone a salmon and produce a dish of their choice. In what was a first for many, filleting the fish proved a challenge, with a number of contestants failing to remove the scales. In the end, Alice, Matt, Sam, Tregan and Wade earned their spot in the main competition while five others were eliminated. The remaining challengers competed to gain an advantage in the next challenge: they had to quickly whip cream into 150 grams of butter and present it to the judges. Beau won the right to study the dish for the next challenge.	1,025,000	6th	25th
5/01-5	Thursday 10 May 2012	Top 50: Part 4 - In their first Pressure Test, Shannon Bennett brought a twist on the classic Peach Melba to the MasterChef hopefuls. With two hours on the clock, contestants struggled with the many technical components of the three-hatted dessert. The six standout performers (Andy, Julia, Kylie, Lydia, Ben and Beau) won their place in the Top 24, while the remaining contestants were assessed by the judges and whittled down to twelve final hopefuls to compete for the last 6 places in the competition.	1,010,000	5th	27th
6/01-6	Friday 11 May 2012	MasterClass 1	723,000	8th	>40th
Week 2
7/02-1	Sunday 13 May 2012	Top 50: Part 5 - The remaining twelve hopefuls faced a French Invention Test set by Jacques Reymond at Montsalvat, an artist colony in Eltham. With 90 minutes on the clock, contestants proved their worth cooking both sweet and savoury dishes. Reymond was very impressed with some contestants skill and ability to capture the "essence of France," and Debra, Filippo, Mindy, Kath, Mario and Emma secured the final places in the Top 24.	1,150,000	5th	14th
8/02-2	Monday 14 May 2012	Top 24 Cooking Challenge - In their first challenge as the Top 24, the contestants had 75 minutes to "put themselves on a plate". In the first challenge set in the MasterChef kitchen, many faltered, forgetting ingredients or producing food that was overcooked or deemed too simple. Emma, Ben and Debra were declared the Top 3, despite each having elements of their dishes that found fault with the judges. Ben was declared the winner, and went into a battle for immunity.	1,042,000	9th	23rd
9/02-3	Tuesday 15 May 2012	Immunity Challenge 1 - Dan Hong's Team beat Ben, Andy and Emma (2-1)	954,000	11th	29th
10/02-4	Wednesday 16 May 2012	Offsite Challenge 1 - In their first Team Challenge, the contestants took over the running of two of King's Cross best restaurants, Ortolan on Bayswater and Concrete Blonde. With five hours of preparation time and three hours to cook and serve, teams also had to run the Front of House and spruik to possible customers. The Red Team, under Emma's leadership struggled initially with delegation of duties, leading them to fall behind and start service late. After a shaky start, they found their rhythm and were praised for the quality of their dishes, especially with dessert made by Kylie. The Blue Team thrived under Andy's leadership and their ability to bring in customers. Their dishes earned praise from the judges, especially Ben's scallop main, but were criticised for their dessert. In the end, it was decided by how much money each restaurant made, and the Blue team's initial organisational edge saw them the victors by over $500. The Red Team were sent into their first elimination challenge.	933,000	9th	17th
11/02-5	Thursday 17 May 2012	Elimination Challenge 1 - In a three-round pasta-themed challenge, the Red Team fought for their places in the competition. In the first round, the contestants had to identify different kinds of pasta with the first six to make a wrong guess moving to the second round. First-in-line Kevin incorrectly labelled one of the hardest varieties (lasagnotte), and as no one else could identify it correctly, his decision pulled the next five people in the line into the second round. Kevin, Jules, TK, Mindy, Emma and Kylie then had to make 250 grams of fettuccine from scratch with the first four declared safe. Kevin and Jules were left in the final round, in which they had to reproduce a Ricotta & Egg Yolk Raviolo with Sage & Burnt Butter Sauce. Despite excelling in presentation, Kevin's lack of seasoning and imbalance of flavour led him to be the first eliminated contestant of the series.	996,000	6th	16th
12/02-6	Friday 18 May 2012	MasterClass 2	617,000	13th	>40th
Week 3
13/03-1	Sunday 20 May 2012	Sunday Challenge 1 - In the Mystery Box challenge, contestants were faced with a range of ingredients that had to be "cracked", such as eggs, crab, nuts and spices. With the judges only tasting their favourite three dishes, the twenty-three hopefuls fought to gain their attention with some inventive dishes. Filippo beat out Mindy and Debra to gain the advantage of picking the core ingredient for the Invention Test. Tasked with making the perfect sandwich using tomato as the core ingredient, the quality of dishes meant the judges were faced with a difficult decision. Filippo, Mindy and Debra excelled again and along with Dalvinder were the Top 4, but it was Mindy who impressed the most. While TK, Wade and Lydia made enough mistakes to fall into the Bottom 3, and face elimination.	1,330,000	5th	12th
14/03-2	Monday 21 May 2012	Pressure Test 1 - TK, Wade and Lydia faced a Peter Gilmore challenge, in which they had three and a half hours to replicate Quay's Eight Texture Chocolate Cake, consisting of a chocolate mousse, chocolate and hazelnut dacquoise, a caramel, vanilla and chocolate ganache, tempered chocolate disc and a warm chocolate sauce. Each contestant worked well under pressure, systematically tackling each component, although TK initially chose to disregard the order of steps provided, and having enough time to assemble the cake. In the end, TK recovered well to produce the best replication of Peter's dish, and while Wade was let down by his presentation, it was Lydia's curdled cream that sealed her elimination, becoming the second contestant eliminated from the game.	1,020,000	8th	28th
15/03-3	Tuesday 22 May 2012	Immunity Challenge 2 - The Blue Ducks team beat Mindy, Amina and Julia (2-1)	1,031,000	10th	26th
16/03-4	Wednesday 23 May 2012	Offsite Challenge 2 - In this yum cha challenge, contestants had to serve 5 different kinds of yum cha in Sydney's Chinese Garden of Friendship. The team with the most total votes from the visitors to the Garden would avoid elimination. Both teams faced struggles in preparation, with the Blue Team forgetting ingredients and Debra and Mindy's leadership of the Red Team causing confusion. While the quality of food was generally close, it was the Blue Team's initial speedy service that gave them the edge over Red with 148 votes to 97, sending the Red Team into elimination.	975,000	10th	32nd
17/03-5	Thursday 24 May 2012	Elimination Challenge 2 - The first of a two-part Elimination Challenge consisted of a Taste Test, in which the contestants had to guess the 25 ingredients of Gary's Moroccan Tajine, with the first 5 contestants to get an ingredient wrong going into the elimination round. Debra, Matt, Filippo, Emma and Andrew fought it out, given the choice of any 5 ingredients from the tajine to make a single dish in 45 minutes. Matt and Filippo were the bottom two, but despite some errors, it was Matt's undercooked lamb that sealed his elimination.	943,000	7th	36th
18/03-6	Friday 25 May 2012	MasterClass 3	728,000	9th	>40th
Week 4
19/04-1	Sunday 27 May 2012	Sunday Challenge 2 - In a biscuit-themed Mystery Box, Julia beat out Ben and Amina with her Melting Moments. In a Mexican-themed Invention Test Julia chose cactus and prickly pear as the core ingredient. And while Mindy won a second shot at immunity, beating Alice and Dalvinder, Julia found herself in the Bottom 3 with Andrew and Kath, and a Pressure Test battle.	1,237,000	5th	14th
20/04-2	Monday 28 May 2012	Pressure Test 2 - Kath, Andrew and Julia were faced with the task of reproducing Maggie Beer's Upside Down Grape Cake with Ginger, Raisin & Lemon Wafers and Olive Oil & Verjuice Ice Cream in only 90 minutes. Julia managed the best overall reproduction of the cake and its garnishes. Both Kath's and Andrew's cakes were very undercooked, but won praise for their accompaniments, Andrew with the best ice cream and Kath the best wafers. In the end, it was Kath's collapsed cake that led to her elimination.	1,040,000	8th	25th
21/04-3	Tuesday 29 May 2012	Immunity Challenge 3 - Mindy, Amina and Audra beat Shaun Presland's team (2-1)	1,040,000	8th	24th
22/04-4	Wednesday 30 May 2012	Offsite Challenge 3 - The teams were tasked with creating a three-course fundraising dinner for OzHarvest - a charity organisation that collects leftover produce from restaurants to feed the needy. The winner of the challenge would be decided by the guests, who paid as much as they thought the dinner was worth. Teams picked up ingredients on behalf of OzHarvest and created their menu from what was available. The Blue Team's decision to inform guests on where the produce was sourced led them to receive a $20,000 donation, winning them the challenge and raising $32,012 in total for the charity.	1,094,000	5th	19th
23/04-5	Thursday 31 May 2012	Elimination Challenge 3 - In the first part of the elimination, contestants had to correctly name 10 different kinds of poultry. The first five to guess incorrectly, would go on to the second elimination round. TK, Julia, Debra, Tregan and Alice had 60 minutes to cook a dish with poultry of their choice. The bottom two consisted of Julia - with undercooked duck - and TK. It was the latter's uninspiring turkey stir fry, which she put together in 10 minutes after overcooking her turkey breast, that sent her home.	1,053,000	6th	21st
24/04-6	Friday 1 June 2012	MasterClass 4	745,000	9th	>40th
Week 5 (Tasmania Week)
25/05-1	Sunday 3 June 2012	Sunday Challenge 3 - In the third Mystery Box of the Top 24, Dalvinder beat Audra and Beau with her nostalgic sweet & sour pork dish with egg dumplings. In the Invention Test, contestants got their pick from three classic "seductive" combinations to use as a core ingredient: strawberries & cream, champagne & caviar, or chocolate & roses, while Dalvinder had no restrictions. As there would be no bottom 3, Andy sat it out with a badly burnt hand. Tregan and Filippo were beaten by Sam and his refined "Seafood for Two" dish, which featured elements such as a champagne jelly and caviar cream.	1,330,000	6th	11th
26/05-2	Monday 4 June 2012	Salamanca Challenge - Tasmania Week began with a four-team Market Stall Challenge, which took place at Hobart's famous Salamanca Markets. The teams had to set up stalls and sell dishes made exclusively from market-sourced ingredients, with the team that impressed the judges with their quality and total earnings declared the winners. Each team served some delicious fare, but it was the Blue Team's (handpicked by Sunday Challenge winner Sam) range of clever dishes that won them the right to cook off for a shot at immunity.	1,037,000	9th	23rd
27/05-3	Tuesday 5 June 2012	Immunity Challenge 4 - As the winning team from the Salamanca Challenge, Sam, Kylie, Ben, Mindy and Amina traveled south to Kettering to cook for a spot in the Immunity Challenge. They first had to net a salmon, the weight of which would determine their cooking time, and then cook using their catch. Sam and Amina, who had the longest cooking times, produced the Top 2 dishes of the day but Sam's slightly overcooked salmon gave Amina the shot at immunity. In a more traditional Immunity Challenge, chef Philippe Leban of The Source at MONA, outcooked Amina on a tricky dessert, beating her on total points (25-22).	975,000	10th	29th
28/05-4	Wednesday 6 June 2012	Offsite Challenge 4 - The contestants were divided into two teams for an Afternoon Tea Challenge, Andrew captaining the Reds and Amina the Blues. The teams had to produce four dishes to serve at an afternoon tea at Launceston's Cataract Gorge for 100 guests, who would vote for their favourite. While some contestants foraged on local farms for ingredients for their dishes, others milled flour in Oatlands – a process that wasn't without incident. The Blue Team, buoyed by excellent presentation and a high quality of dishes (including Julia's Melting Moments), took the challenge by a landslide 60 votes to 12, leaving the Reds facing another Elimination Challenge.	1,115,000	5th	18th
29/05-5	Thursday 7 June 2012	Elimination Challenge 4 - The Elimination Challenge in Stanley began with a Skills Test – the contestants having to cook the perfect medium rare steak. Kylie, Ben, Andy and Sam were the first contestants found to have incorrectly cooked their meat, sending them through to the second round: an onion ring cook-off. Kylie and Ben most impressed, leaving Andy and Sam to compete in the final round: at the Stanley Hotel both contestants had to cook one dish for 50 people. Andy (cooking beef cheek) and Sam (cooking crayfish) were both praised for the quality of their food as well as their sportsmanship throughout preparation and service, leading the judges to declare a tie and keep them both in the competition.	999,000	7th	25th
30/05-6	Friday 8 June 2012	MasterClass 5	767,000	8th	>40th
Week 6
31/06-1	Sunday 10 June 2012	Sunday Challenge 4 - In the Mystery Box challenge, the contestants were given a single egg and asked to make it the hero of their dish. The Top 6 were selected and ranked, with Kylie's Poached Meringue the standout dish, over Mindy, Andy, Jules, Amina and Andrew, respectively. For the invention test, which was set by Rick Stein, the winning contestants, in ranking order, picked a type of seafood and a country to inspire dishes which their teams would prepare. Rick was impressed with most teams' ability to encapsulate the essence of their given country's cuisine, but it was Team Morocco, consisting of Jules, Alice and Tregan, who won the opportunity to cook for immunity. Given botargo to create a UK-inspired dish, Andrew, Dalvinder and Audra struggled with the unfamiliar ingredient and fell into the Bottom 3 and a Pressure Test.	1,132,000	5th	23rd
32/06-2	Monday 11 June 2012	Pressure Test 3 - Dalvinder, Audra and Andrew were given three and a half hours to replicate George's 'Greek Salad', an intricate dish featuring ten elements and various cooking techniques, such as a capsicum terrine, black olive sponge and a cucumber ice cream. Audra produced the best dish overall and was the first declared safe. While Andrew's decision to take a shortcut with his capsicum terrine led to it not setting as a result, it was Dalvinder who, despite having the best terrine, presented a dish that lacked flavour and had technical errors. That led to her elimination.	1,082,000	9th	27th
33/06-3	Tuesday 12 June 2012	Immunity Challenge 5 - Jamie Oliver beat Jules, Alice and Tregan (27-25-24-21, respectively)	1,294,000	4th	17th
34/06-4	Wednesday 13 June 2012	Offsite Challenge 5 - The contestants faced a 24-Hour Team Challenge, in which they had to run an entire day's service at the Shangri-La hotel in Sydney. Groups of three contestants each faced a shift in which they catered for hotel staff, served canapés for a function, covered room service orders and ran the hotel's restaurant. While both teams faced some problems with preparation and service, it was the speed and efficiency of the Blue Team that won them another Challenge victory.	1,054,000	9th	31st
35/06-5	Thursday 14 June 2012	Elimination Challenge 5 - In the first round of a three-round elimination, contestants were tasked with creating a dish in just 20 minutes. Kylie, Debra, Filippo and Amina produced the most impressive dishes and were declared safe. In the second round, the remaining contestants were given only 10 minutes to create a dish. Tregan, Sam and Emma's dishes were the best, with Mario and Julia left to face off in the final round. Given only five minutes, Mario opted for a simple salad while Julia cooked an intricate three-layered dessert. It was her innovative use of time and ingredients that saw her pronounced safe, as Mario was the seventh person eliminated.	1,058,000	6th	30th
36/06-6	Friday 15 June 2012	MasterClass 6	666,000	11th	>40th
Week 7
37/07-1	Sunday 17 June 2012	Sunday Challenge 5 - The contestants faced a Mystery Box set by the three previous MasterChef Australia winners: Julie Goodwin, Adam Liaw and Kate Bracks, who each brought a Box containing five of their favourite ingredients. The top four consisted of Audra, Andrew, Debra and Mindy, with Audra pronounced the winner thanks to her elegant dish of pork belly over noodles. Wade, Filippo and Emma's dishes were the least impressive, sending them into a Pressure Test.	973,000	6th	28th
38/07-2	Monday 18 June 2012	Pressure Test 4 - Wade, Emma and Filippo had to recreate Gary's Quiche Lorraine without the aid of a recipe, and create an accompanying salad. Emma's effort was deemed the best overall; with the creamiest custard, the flakiest pastry and the best salad, she was the first pronounced safe. The biggest flaw in Wade's quiche was undercooked pastry, and his salad was deemed "careless". But it was Filippo's uneven stuffing, use of the wrong cheese (cheddar instead of gruyère) and "old-fashioned" salad that were enough to see him eliminated.	1,048,000	11th	23rd
39/07-3	Tuesday 19 June 2012	Immunity Challenge 6 - Hamish Ingham's team beat Audra, Kylie and Amina (2-1)	1,036,000	9th	24th
40/07-4	Wednesday 20 June 2012	Offsite Challenge 6 - The two teams were tasked with catering a Sri-Lankan wedding ceremony for 450, with the guests to determine the challenge winner. Guest chef Kumar Mahadevan mentored the Red and Blue teams, both of whom struggled with the expectations of the challenge, the timing, food preparation and quality and having to work together despite competing against each other. The judges and guests were overall impressed with the dishes provided and it was a close call, but it was the Red Team who won by 243 votes to 207.	1,125,000	5th	20th
41/07-5	Thursday 21 June 2012	Elimination Challenge 6 - The Blue Team were faced with a cake-themed Elimination Challenge. Contestants had to pick out and correctly name a cake from a line-up. Emma and Ben were the first to guess incorrectly and were sent into the final elimination round. Ben offered to give up his place in the competition if it would save Emma, but after the judges made it clear that, should he leave, Emma would still have to cook, he decided to cook in the second round. Given 1 hour and 40 minutes to create a cake, both Ben and Emma were commended for their flavour combinations, but criticised for their "messy" presentation. In the end, Emma's dense sponge couldn't match Ben's sophisticated flavours and she was the ninth contestant eliminated.	1,108,000	5th	21st
42/07-6	Friday 22 June 2012	MasterClass 7	872,000	6th	34th
Week 8
43/08-1	Sunday 24 June 2012	Sunday Challenge 6 - In the Mystery Box Challenge contestants were given 60 minutes to make a soup of their choice. The top three consisted of Debra, Amina and Wade, with the latter's Mushroom Soup with Porcini Croutons picked as the judges' favourite. With "dude food" as the theme for the Invention Test, and Wade's pick of Japanese mayonnaise as the core ingredient, contestants cooked a host of indulgent and tasty dishes. Julia, Kylie and Tregan landed in the top three and it was Tregan that managed to win a shot at immunity, while Amina, Andrew and Sam were left as the bottom three.	1,375,000	6th	11th
44/08-2	Monday 25 June 2012	Pressure Test 5 - Andrew, Amina and Sam had two hours to replicate Christine Manfield's Smoked River Trout with Mussels and Turmeric Lemongrass Broth, a technical dish with 40 ingredients. This proved highly challenging for the contestants, and in the end, each dish was criticised. Andrew, despite having too much broth, cooked the best dish overall and was the first declared safe. And while Amina filleted her fish poorly and put too much white pepper in her broth, Sam's over-reduced broth and under-smoked fish despite having the best presentation, eliminated him from the competition.	1,150,000	7th	19th
45/08-3	Tuesday 26 June 2012	Immunity Challenge 7 - Daniel Wilson's team beat Tregan, Jules and Julia (2-1)	1,066,000	7th	25th
46/08-4	Wednesday 27 June 2012	Offsite Challenge 7 - In a 'home-style' challenge, contestants first had 90 minutes in the MasterChef house to cook for the chance at immunity from the next elimination. The top two dishes, picked from the judges' favorite five dishes, were Audra and Ben. The other three favourites were team captains in the next challenge: cooking a three-course meal in three different homes using ingredients only from those homes. Each team served up dishes with their own merits and criticisms given the nature of the challenge; the Yellow Team struggled cooking in a makeshift kitchen with limited cooking equipment. The Red Team were judged best overall, thus sending the Blue (with raw lamb) and Yellow (which did not serve up dessert in time) Teams to elimination.	1,099,000	5th	22nd
47/08-5	Thursday 28 June 2012	Elimination Challenge 7 - The eight losing contestants had their pick from 120 ingredients, with a catch: any ingredient, when picked, could only be used once and only by that contestant. Besides the "first-come, first-served" rule, they also had to incorporate every ingredient they picked in that round and were given only 30 minutes. In the first round, using 8 ingredients, Andy, Amina and Mindy were pronounced safe. In the second round, using 5 ingredients, Alice and Debra were the top two leaving Jules, Julia and Tregan in the final round. Despite all serving up quality dishes with minor flaws, it was Tregan who was eliminated.	1,044,000	7th	26th
48/08-6	Friday 29 June 2012	MasterClass 8	699,000	9th	>40th
Week 9
49/09-1	Sunday 1 July 2012	Sunday Challenge 7 - In an Invention Test set by Heston Blumenthal from The Fat Duck, contestants got their pick from six core ingredients that would be paired with an unknown ingredient chosen by Heston. After it was revealed that all the ingredients (bacon, Vegemite, cauliflower, beetroot, caviar and blue cheese) would be paired with chocolate, contestants were given full run of the pantry to cook a single dish that highlights the given flavour combination. Kylie won the challenge and a shot at immunity with her Blue Cheese & Honey Sundae with Chocolate Fudge Sauce, despite other great desserts from Julia and Jules, who completed the top three. Beau, Andrew and Amina were the bottom three, due to lack of concept in their dishes and poor flavour combinations.	1,070,000	9th	23rd
50/09-2	Monday 2 July 2012	Pressure Test 6 - Andrew, Amina and Beau were given two hours to recreate Vincent Gadan's "Essence of a Woman" dessert, an extremely intricate dish featuring a frozen salted parfait shaped like a vintage bottle of perfume, a rhubarb velvet, tempered chocolate and an isomalt sugar shard. Beau produced the best overall dish, receiving no criticism whatsoever. It was between Amina, who had clumsy presentation but great texture in her parfait, and Andrew. Despite having the best sugar work, it were the cracks in his sculpting chocolate (the tube of the "perfume bottle") and the lack of texture in his parfait that saw Andrew eliminated.	1,396,000	2nd	10th
51/09-3	Tuesday 3 July 2012	Immunity Challenge 8 - Kylie and Mindy beat Tomislav Martinovic's team (2-1)	1,355,000	1st	11th
52/09-4	Wednesday 4 July 2012	Offsite Challenge 8 - The teams were tasked with creating a pop-up restaurant. The Blue Team struggled with poor leadership, timing, and food preparation. The judges were overall impressed with the Mexican dishes provided by the Red Team and send the Blue Team into elimination.	1,255,000	6th	17th
53/09-5	Thursday 5 July 2012	Elimination Challenge 8 - Iconic British chef Marco Pierre White served as a mentor and guest judge on a series' first Double Elimination Challenge. In the first round, contestants were given 20 minutes to cook an entrée. Wade's simple sprout salad was deemed the best and he was instantly pronounced safe, followed by Audra and Debra. In the final round Jules, Andy and Amina were given 45 minutes to cook a main and an additional 15 minutes to serve up a dessert. Despite poor presentation on his main, Andy's dishes were pronounced the best overall as Amina and Jules were eliminated.	1,299,000	1st	13th
54/09-6	Friday 6 July 2012	MasterClass 9	832,000	5th	35th
Week 10 (Italy Week)
55/10-1	Sunday 8 July 2012	Sunday Challenge 8 - For their first Challenge of Italy week, the contestants split into teams of two and wandered the streets of Rome seeking inspiration for a "Roman story on a plate". After their expedition, the teams went to the Villa Aurelia where they had 90 minutes to cook, with Chef Massimo Bottura as a guest judge. The best dishes were judged to be the Green Team of Alice and Wade's Squid Ink Gnocchi, and the Orange Team of Julia and Mindy's Roman Seafood Stew. Their reward: to cook in the following day's Challenge for a shot at guaranteed immunity.	1,396,000	4th	4th
56/10-2	Monday 9 July 2012	Rome Pizza and Pasta Challenge - Alice, Wade, Mindy and Julia competed in a Pizza and Pasta Challenge, cooking lunch for 120 Roman diners, while the rest of the contestants served either on front of house or as dishwashers. The chefs responsible for the two best dishes of the day would win the right to cook for guaranteed immunity. With four hopefuls sharing limited kitchen space, the action was manic, with George having to step in to assist in order to get customers served. Mindy's pasta and Alice's pizza were a resounding hit with the judges, sending them through to the Immunity Challenge.	1,259,000	4th	13th
57/10-3	Tuesday 10 July 2012	Immunity Challenge 9 - Before facing off, Mindy and Alice set off on a 'taste tour' of Florence in preparation for the dishes they’d be making. Celebrity chef Antonio Carluccio judged the challenge, which took place over two rounds. The first was a taste test, with the contestants having to isolate the ingredients in a Ribollita. Alice won the round, and the option to choose either savoury or sweet for the next stage, choosing savoury. They then had 90 minutes to cook the same three savoury dishes. With judging extremely close, it came down to whose rabbit dish they preferred. Alice's was chosen, awarding her an Immunity Pin.	1,330,000	1st	8th
58/10-4	Wednesday 11 July 2012	Italy Team Challenge - The contestants competed in a 'Death Dish' Challenge, having to recreate Gualtiero Marchesi's risotto. Wade, Audra, Mindy, Kylie and Beau were considered the strongest, and formed the Red Team for the forthcoming challenge, while Julia, Ben, Debra, Andy and Alice made up the Green Team. The Team Challenge was at the Barilla Pasta Factory in Parma, with the teams cooking three pasta dishes each to feed 500 staff. As their advantage, the Reds got first choice of which pasta types they wanted to cook with. The teams both produced superb performances, but the Red Team's lasagne was such a hit it gave them the overall win, sending the Greens into elimination.	1,331,000	1st	9th
59/10-5	Thursday 12 July 2012	Elimination Challenge 9 - The Green Team were sent to the Tuscan village of Monticchiello (Pienza) to cook for 50 of its residents. Alice opted not to use her Immunity Pin. The first round consisted of a competition to roll 100g of acceptable quality Pici the fastest in order to choose what they wanted to cook on the menu for the second round. Ben completed the challenge first and chose to make Pici again in the 2nd round. Alice was second, choosing the Antipasti. Debra was sent back, allowing Julia and Andy to choose dessert and salted cod respectively, leaving her with the spit-roasted pig. In the 2nd round, the contestants were given four hours to prepare the dishes with the best being voted by the villagers and the rest decided by Gary and George. Alice was chosen by the villagers and Andy and Ben were declared safe, leaving Debra and Julia in the bottom two, whereupon Debra was eliminated for her pig dish. Exceptionally, she was allowed to attend the following MasterClass.	1,363,000	1st	7th
60/10-6	Friday 13 July 2012	MasterClass 10	898,000	4th	29th
Week 11 (Semi-Finals Week)
61/11-1	Sunday 15 July 2012	Sunday Challenge 8 - Contestants had to cook with whatever they found in one of nine fridges. Andy, Mindy and Audra excelled with their dishes, mostly compiled from leftovers. Andy made full use of the fresh ingredients in his fridge to make a winning Smoked Trout Pie. In the second round, the judges were joined by MasterChef magazine editor Sally Feldman. With a spot on the cover of the magazine at stake, contestants were given 90 minutes to cook a single dish that was cover-worthy. As an advantage for winning the "What's in the Fridge?" Challenge, Andy was given an extra 30 minutes. Dessert girls Mindy, Kylie and Julia came out on top of the challenge, with Mindy's chocolate tart crowned dish of the day. Wade, Alice and Ben produced the least impressive dishes. Alice was informed that, should she use her Immunity Pin, Beau would take her place in the following day's Pressure Test.	1,468,000	3rd	3rd
62/11-2	Monday 16 July 2012	Pressure Test 7 - With Alice opting not to use her Immunity Pin, she, Ben and Wade were faced with a Crispy-Scaled Snapper with a Squid Wafer, created by chef Grant King. The judges couldn't find fault with Ben's dish: despite suffering a shaky start, he plated a near-perfect reproduction. Wade and Alice were evenly matched, and it came down to their biggest mistakes. Alice had left a dangerous hooked bone in the fish, and Wade had put his squid spaghetti on top of his fish, making the crispy scales soggy. As the judges considered the latter the hero of the dish, Wade was eliminated.	1,355,000	1st	8th
63/11-3	Tuesday 17 July 2012	Elimination Challenge 10 - Alice, Mindy and Kylie all used their Immunity Pins to skip this challenge. The remaining contestants had to keep up with guest chef Kylie Kwong in the first round, where they created a crab dish and had to plate up along with Kylie. Ben and Andy plated the best dishes and were pronounced safe after this round. Audra, Beau and Julia then had to create a Chinese dish in 45 minutes with one of Kylie's favourite core ingredients and eight more from the pantry. Audra was the first deemed safe with her dish of deep-fried tofu, leaving the decision between Julia, who had cooked what the judges deemed the least Chinese, and Beau, whose dish was very simple and lacked punch. In the end, the judges went for Julia, and Beau was eliminated.	1,372,000	1st	6th
64/11-4	Wednesday 18 July 2012	Offsite Challenge 9 - The hopefuls had to cook a French dessert in an hour with free run of the pantry. Audra's Chocolate Frangipane Tart with Poached Pears not only won her immunity from the forthcoming Team Challenge and a guaranteed spot in Finals Week, but she also got to pick the pairs. The remaining six had to design an edible centerpiece inspired by Marie-Antoine Carême, with Adriano Zumbo as a mentor. They did prep work at Le Cordon Bleu in Sydney, and assembled their cakes at Sydney's Curzon Hall. Audra's choice to split up Kylie and Julia and putting Mindy and Andy - both weak in dessert - together, paid off. Mindy and Andy plated up the worst dish by far, and it was between the Green Team (Julia and Alice) and the Blue Team (Kylie and Ben). Green's choice to put a sugar box on the top didn't pay off, as it was too big and clumsy. Blue's cake suffered from a dense base, but looked the best overall. Kylie and Ben were sent into Finals Week, with the rest up for elimination.	1,426,000	1st	4th
65/11-5	Thursday 19 July 2012	Elimination Challenge 11 - Representatives from the contestants' families were invited into the kitchen and set them a challenge: to cook a single dish that shows them how much progress they made throughout the competition. Mindy served up the dish of the day and was the first sent into Finals Week. Andy also impressed, and was the second. It came down to Julia, with a simple dish that didn't really fit the brief, and Alice, with overcooked lamb. The latter was eliminated due to this key flaw.	1,291,000	1st	10th
66/11-6	Friday 20 July 2012	MasterClass 11	829,000	6th	34th
Week 12 (Finals Week)
67/12-1	Sunday 22 July 2012	Finals Week Elimination 1 - The hopefuls were taken to Guillaume at Bennelong at Sydney Opera House to cook for sixty guests under scrutiny of chef Guillaume Brahimi. The order in which the contestants got to pick which of the six signature dishes they'd cook for service was determined by chance. The result would be determined by kitchen performance, opinions around the dining room and the judges' tasting. Andy, Ben and Julia performed well enough all-round to be safe. Audra struggled in the kitchen, but the dish sent out in the end was "impeccable". Both Mindy and Kylie had great kitchen performances, but Mindy's mushrooms were undercooked and Kylie's parfait had curdled due to a host of technical errors. Kylie was eliminated, but was offered a pastry apprenticeship by Brahimi.	1,454,000	4th	15th
68/12-2	Monday 23 July 2012	Finals Week Elimination 2 - The contestants were given 20 minutes to make a perfect steak sauce. The hopefuls would then be ranked from 1 to 5 according to the quality of their sauce, thus determining the order in which they got to pick their cuts of beef for the second challenge. Audra produced the best sauce with Andy as a close second, with Julia performing the worst. For the second part of the challenge, the judges were joined by John Torode, host and judge of the original British MasterChef. The contestants were to pick a cut of beef of their choice and create a dish in 2 hours. Andy's sophisticated dish came out on top, with Julia and Ben on the bottom. With technical mistakes in both, it came down to lack of direction in Ben's dish as he was eliminated.	1,549,000	2nd	8th
69/12-3	Tuesday 24 July 2012	Finals Week Elimination 3 - The top 4 were asked to cook their signature dish worthy of three hats in 90 minutes with an open pantry. A three-hatted chef was paired with each contestant and were allowed 5 minutes to design and discuss the dish before cooking started. At any time during the 90 minutes, contestants were allowed one block of 15 minutes with their assigned chef for guidance. Andy produced the best dish for the third straight time, receiving no substantial criticism on his dish. Julia was accused of biting off more than she could chew for the 90 allotted minutes, but she delivered on flavour and was the next sent into the Grand Finale. It came down to Audra, whose dish disappointed the judges for not showing enough technique, and Mindy, who had drastically undercooked her fillet of barramundi. Top favourite Mindy was eliminated because of her serious mistake "that could've been easily set right".	1,520,000	1st	12th
70/12-4	Wednesday 25 July 2012	Grand Finale - Andy, Audra and Julia faced off in the Grand Finale, consisting of three challenges.: Entrée - The final three were given three hours to prep 35 hot entrées each and 30 minutes to plate them up during service. Each finalist could also select two eliminated contestants as commis chefs. The person with the lowest score would land in third place. Julia's dish was criticized for sounding like a main course, but was very well-received overall despite lacking punch of flavour. Andy's lacked visual balance due to the size of his tuna portion, but scored in taste. Audra's got rave reviews, but missed the brief as it contained too many cold salad elements. Julia scored 25, Andy 23 and Audra 22, eliminating her and pitting Julia and Andy against each other for the last two rounds.; Main - Andy and Julia were given 90 minutes to cook their own interpretation of "Australia's National Dish". Andy served up his modernised Seafood Basket with which the judges found little fault, despite insecure plating. Julia's lamb dish fared worse with slightly undercooked meat. Julia received 21 points; Andy got 28 (including a perfect 10), allowing him to overtake Julia with 51 to 46.; Dessert - Christine Manfield set the signature final sweet challenge with her "Gaytime Goes Nuts", a highly intricate dessert including a cylindrical biscuit, two ice creams, a mousse, a soil, a caramel and a honeycomb. Julia failed to plate up four perfect biscuits and her caramel ice cream lacked intensity. Andy did manage near-perfect looking desserts, but failed to fix his split caramel to a decent consistency and had a dense mousse on top. Julia scored 22 and Andy 25, tallying the final score to 76 for Andy and 68 for Julia out of a possible 90.	1,888,000 (Metro) 2,494,000 (Australia Wide)	2nd	5th
70/12-4	Wednesday 25 July 2012	The Winner Announced - Andy was crowned MasterChef Australia 2012. He won $100,000, a cookbook deal and professional training in the country's best kitchens. Julia was given $15,000 and a pastry apprenticeship with Adriano Zumbo, and Audra received $5,000 for her third-place finish.	2,191,000 (Metro) 2,911,000 (Australia Wide)	1st	1st

Preceded by Junior MasterChef Australia series 2	MasterChef Australia series 4; 6 May 2012 – 25 July 2012	Succeeded by MasterChef Australia All-Stars
