= Willin Low =

Singaporean chef

Willin Low is a restaurateur and chef in Singapore. His flagship restaurant, Wild Rocket, specializes in what Low describes as "mod sin" or modern Singaporean cuisine. Diners Club named Wild Rocket one of the top 50 restaurants in Asia.

== Career ==
In 2005, Low opened Wild Rocket at Mount Emily. It was closed in 2018.

Low also owned Pastaro, a pasta restaurant at Chancery Court.

Before entering the restaurant industry, Low practiced law for eight years.
