= MasterChef Singapore =

- Genre: Cookery; Reality competition; Food
- Created by: Franc Roddam
- Directed by: Kenny Png
- Judges: Audra Morrice; Damian d’Silva; Bjorn Shen
- Country of origin: Singapore
- Original language: English
- No. of seasons: 4
- No. of episodes: 38

Production
- Executive producers: Jocelyn Little; Andrew Holland; Steven Murphy; Fera Rosihan-Robinson
- Running time: 46—47 minutes
- Production companies: Beach House Pictures; Motion Content Group

Original release
- Network: Mediacorp
- Release: 2 September 2018 – 15 October 2023

MasterChef Singapore is a Singaporean reality competitive cooking show based on the original British MasterChef. It is produced by Beach House Pictures and Motion Content Group and airs on Mediacorp Channel 5. Bjorn Shen (Chef/Owner of Artichoke), Damian D'Silva (Executive Chef of Restaurant Kin) and Audra Morrice (MasterChef Australia series 4 finalist and MasterChef Asia judge) serve as the show's main judges.

The first season premiered at 9:30 pm on 2 September 2018. A second series was announced in August 2020; it premiered on 21 February 2021. A third season of MasterChef Singapore was announced on 19 August 2021, it premiered on 1 May 2022. The fourth season premiered on 9 August 2023.

== Series overview ==
=== Seasons ===
Season	Episodes	Premiere date	Finale date	No. of Finalists	Winner	Runner(s)-up	Judge 1	Judge 2	Judge 3
1	8	2 September 2018	21 October 2018	10 (18)	Zander Ng	Gen Lee	Bjorn Shen	Audra Morrice	Damian d'Silva
2	10	21 February 2021	25 April 2021	12 (24)	Derek Cheong	Leon Lim	Bjorn Shen	Audra Morrice	Damian d'Silva
3	10	1 May 2022	3 July 2022	12 (18)	Johnathan Chew	Nares Nareskanna	Bjorn Shen	Audra Morrice	Damian d'Silva
4	10	9 August 2023	15 October 2023	12 (18)	Inderpal Singh	Tina Amin	Bjorn Shen	Audra Morrice	Damian d'Silva

=== Specials ===
A two-part special, in which four returning contestants from the first season mentored four new contestants from disadvantaged backgrounds for a chance to win an internship in the food industry, aired on 2 and 9 November 2019.
