= All Star Family Feud =

- Genre: Game show
- Based on: Family Feud
- Presented by: Grant Denyer
- Country of origin: Australia
- Original language: English
- No. of seasons: 3
- No. of episodes: 28

Production
- Production locations: Melbourne, Victoria (2016–2017); Sydney, New South Wales (2018)
- Running time: 60 minutes
- Production company: FremantleMedia Australia

Original release
- Network: Network Ten
- Release: 14 March 2016 – 6 May 2018

Related
- Family Feud

All Star Family Feud is an Australian game show that aired on Network Ten from 14 March 2016 until 6 May 2018. The series, which is a spin off of Family Feud, sees celebrities compete in teams to raise money for their chosen charity. All Star Family Feud was filmed at Global Television Studios in Southbank, Melbourne from 2016 to 2017 and at Network Ten's Studios in Pyrmont, Sydney in 2018.

== Differences from regular Family Feud ==
The primary difference in game play of the All Star version compared to the civilian version is the number of rounds (as a 60-minute show compared to 30 minutes) and win conditions. Each game consists of six rounds (3 regular value rounds, 2 "double" rounds, and a "triple" round), with the winner being the team with more points at the end of the sixth round (there is no 300 points to win rule, and no Sudden Death). The first two members of each team face off twice, and the other two members face off once (with the exception of the 2017 The Bold and the Beautiful 30th Anniversary episode, where the Atlanta format of five players per team was used, where only the captain plays twice and the other four members play once).

The winning team wins an automatic $20,000 for their chosen charity and has a chance at Fast Money for a bonus $10,000. The losing team is automatically guaranteed $10,000 for their nominated charity.

As with Family Feud, losing Fast Money donated $10 a point.

== Season overview ==
Series	Episodes	Originally released	
Series	Episodes	First released	Last released
1	18	14 March 2016	21 November 2016
2	7	23 March 2017	27 November 2017
3	3	18 March 2018	6 May 2018

== Episodes ==
=== Season 1 (2016) ===
Note: Winners are listed in bold

No. overall	No. in season	Teams	Original release date	Viewers
1	1	NRL Stars vs **AFL Stars**	14 March 2016	648,000
**NRL Stars**; Team Members: Wendell Sailor, Preston Campbell, Robbie Kearns, Tohu Harris; Team captain: Wendell Sailor; Charity: Cure Brain Cancer; Money Raised: $10,000; **AFL Stars**; Team Members: Barry Hall, Brent Harvey, Jack Viney, Kevin Sheedy; Team captain: Barry Hall; Charity: Blue September; Money Raised: $30,000
2	2	MasterChef Australia: Judges vs **Contestants**	21 March 2016	674,000
**Judges**; Team Members: Gary Mehigan, George Calombaris, Matt Preston, Shannon Bennett; Team captain: Gary Mehigan; Charity: Sacred Heart Mission; Money Raised: $10,000; **Contestants**; Team Members: Julie Goodwin, Dani Venn, Emma Dean, Brent Owens; Team captain: Julie Goodwin; Charity: Cure MND Foundation; Money Raised: $30,000
3	3	Comedians: **Do** vs O'Neil	28 March 2016	570,000
**Do**; Members: Anh Do, Fiona O'Loughlin, Emily Taheny, Steven Gates; Team captain: Anh Do; Charity: Youth off the Streets; Money raised: $30,000; **O'Neil**; Members: Dave O'Neil, Em Rusciano, Harley Breen, Anne Edmonds; Team captain: Dave O'Nei; Charity: The Pyjama Foundation; Money raised: $10,000
4	4	**Neighbours** vs The Project	4 April 2016	670,000
**Neighbours**; Members: Olympia Valance, Alan Fletcher, Jackie Woodburne, Stefan Dennis; Team captain: Olympia Valance; Charity: Australian Childhood Foundation; Money raised: $30,000; **The Project**; Members: Carrie Bickmore, Waleed Aly, Peter Helliar, Steve Price; Team captain: Carrie Bickmore; Charity: Carrie's Beanies 4 Brain Cancer; Money raised: $10,000
5	5	**Shark Tank** vs Bondi Rescue	11 April 2016	585,000
**Shark Tank**; Members: Naomi Simson, Steve Baxter, Janine Allis, Glen Richards; Team captain: Naomi Simson; Charity: Cerebral Palsy Alliance; Money raised: $30,000; **Bondi Rescue**; Members: Nicola Atherton, Hoppo, Harries, Jesse Polock; Team captain: Nicola Atherton; Charity: Camp Quality; Money raised: $10,000
6	6	Creasey vs **Swan**	18 April 2016	500,000
**Creasey**; Members: Joel Creasey, Jenny (Mum), Thomas (Friend), Kyle (Friend); Team captain: Joel Creasey; Charity: JDRF (Juvenile Diabetes Research Foundation); Money raised: $10,000; **Swan**; Members: Chrissie Swan, Pat (Mum), Carmel (Aunt), Catherine (Sister); Team captain: Chrissie Swan; Charity: Ardoch Youth Foundation; Money raised: $30,000
7	7	Fitzy vs **Wippa**	25 April 2016	430,000
**Fitzy**; Members: Fitzy, Claire (Mum), Mick (Dad), Holly (Sister); Team captain: Fitzy; Charity: Kidsafe SA; Money raised: $10,000; **Wippa**; Members: Wippa, Christine (Mum), Norma (Grandmother), Louise (Sister); Team captain: Wippa; Charity: My Room (Children's Cancer Centre); Money raised: $30,000
8	8	Have You Been Paying Attention? vs **The Living Room**	27 April 2016	550,000
**HYBPA?**; Members: Tom Gleisner, Jane Kennedy, Sam Pang, Ed Kavalee; Team captain: Tom Gleisner; Charity: Igniting Change; Money raised: $10,000; **The Living Room**; Members: Amanda Keller, Barry Du Bois, Chris Brown, Miguel Maestre; Team captain: Amanda Keller; Charity: RUOK?; Money raised: $30,000
9	9	**The Real Housewives of Melbourne** vs I'm a Celebrity...Get Me Out of Here!	1 August 2016	668,000
**TRHWOM**; Members: Janet Roach, Gamble Breaux, Susie Mclean, Jackie Gillies; Team captain: Janet Roach; Charity: Roach Foundation; Money raised: $30,000; **IACGMOOH**; Members: Brendan Fevola, Jo Beth Taylor, Laurina Fleure, Paul Harragon; Team captain: Brendan Fevola; Charities: Mark Hughes Foundation & Rhino Revolution; Money raised: $10,000
10	10	Supercars Championship: **Ford** vs Holden	7 August 2016	357,000
**Ford**; Members: Mark Winterbottom, Chaz Mostert, Fabian Coulthard, Scott Pye; Team captain: Mark Winterbottom; Charity: Love Your Sister; Money raised: $30,000; **Holden**; Members: James Courtney, Garth Tander, Will Davison, Lee Holdsworth; Team captain: James Courtney; Charity: Movember; Money raised: $10,000
11	11	Radio: **GOLD** vs KIIS	8 August 2016	668,000
**GOLD**; Members: Lehmo, Jo Stanley, Brendan Jones, Amanda Keller; Team captain: Lehmo; Charities: Soldier On and Save Our Sons; Money raised: $30,000; **KIIS**; Members: Meshel Laurie, Matt Tilley, Stacey June, Kirsty Mercer; Team captain: Meshel Laurie; Charity: McAuley Women's Community Services; Money raised: $10,000
12	12	Callea vs **Campbell**	14 August 2016	457,000
**Callea**; Members: Anthony Callea, Santina (Mum), Matt (brother), Annie (friend); Team captain: Anthony Callea; Charity: Lifeline; Money raised: $10,000; **Campbell**; Members: Tim Campbell, Joh (sister), Kelly-Ann (cousin), Erin (sister); Team captain: Tim Campbell; Charity: RSPCA; Money raised: $30,000
13	13	The Wiggles vs **Human Nature**	21 August 2016	528,000
**The Wiggles**; Team Members: Anthony Field, Lachlan Gillespie, Simon Pryce, Emma Watkins; Team captain: Anthony Field; Charity: Legacy Australia; Money Raised: $10,000; **Human Nature**; Team Members: Toby Allen, Phil Burton, Andrew and Michael "Mike" Tierney; Team captain: Andrew Tierney; Charity: Sony Foundation; Money Raised: $30,000
14	14	**Wentworth** vs Prisoner	18 October 2016	392,000
**Wentworth**; Team Members: Celia Ireland, Katrina Milosevic, Kate Jenkinson, Bernard Curry; Team captain: Celia Ireland; Charity: One in Five; Money Raised: $30,000; **Prisoner** Team Members: Colette Mann, Val Lehman, Fiona Spence, Ian Smith; Team captain: Colette Mann; Charities: Positive Women & The MS Society; Money Raised: $10,000
15	15	Australian Survivor: Saanapu Tribe vs **Vavau Tribe**	30 October 2016	330,000
**Saanapu**; Team Members: Lee Carseldine, Elena Rowland, Sam Webb and Brooke Jowett; Team captain: Lee Carseldine; Charities: Exstonepillow & Livin; Money Raised: $10,000; **Vavau**; Team Members: Sue Clarke, Conner Bethune, Rohan Maclaren, Phoebe Timmins; Team captain: Sue Clarke; Charities: Act for Kids & Cure Brain Cancer Foundation; Money Raised: $30,000
16	16	Bachelorettes vs **Bachelors**	7 November 2016	544,000
**Bachelorettes**; Members: Georgia Love, Alex Nation, Keira Maguire, Heather Maltman; Team captain: Georgia Love; Charities: Cancer Council Victoria & Youth off the Streets; Money raised: $10,000; **Bachelors**; Members: Osher Günsberg, Richie Strahan, Davey Lloyd, Dave Billsborrow; Team captain: Osher Gunsberg; Charities: zero2hero & Fight Cancer Foundation; Money raised: $30,000; Note: The members are the former contestants from The Bachelor Australia and The Bachelorette Australia and host Osher Gunsberg.
17	17	BBL: Commentators vs **Cricketers**	20 November 2016	351,000
**BBL Commentators**; Members: Adam Gilchrist, Mel Jones, Mark Howard, Damien Fleming; Team captain: Adam Gilchrist; Charity: Alannah & Madeline Foundation; Money raised: $10,000; **BBL Cricketers**; Members: Shane Watson, Alyssa Healy, James Pattinson, Meg Lanning; Team captain: Shane Watson; Charity: Cure for MND Foundation; Money raised: $30,000
18	18	**TV Hosts** vs Newsreaders	21 November 2016	548,000
**TV Hosts**; Members: Kerri-Anne Kennerley, Tony Barber, Glenn Ridge, John Burgess; Team captain: Kerri-Anne Kennerley; Charity: Look Good Feel Better; Money raised: $30,000; **Newsreaders**; Members: Sandra Sully, Ron Wilson, Natarsha Belling, Stephen Quartermain; Team captain: Sandra Sully; Charities: McGrath Foundation and Unicorn Foundation; Money raised: $10,000

=== Season 2 (2017) ===
Note: Winners are listed in bold

No. overall	No. in season	Teams	Original release date	Viewers
19	1	The Bold and the Beautiful: Bold vs **Beautiful**	23 March 2017	457,000
This episode aired to coincide with the 30th anniversary of the show's premiere in the United States and a week of episodes filmed and set in Australia. NOTE: There were two rule changes for this episode only.: 1. Teams were five per side, as in the United States version.; 2. As such, only the team captain participated in two face-offs, the first round and the sixth round (triple point) round. The other four players per side participated in one face-off each.; **Bold**; Members: John McCook, Thorsten Kaye, Pierson Fodé, Scott Clifton, Don Diamont; Team captain: John McCook; Charity: Youth off the Streets; Money Raised: $10,000; **Beautiful**; Members: Katherine Kelly Lang, Heather Tom, Ashleigh Brewer, Jacqueline MacInnes Wood, Rena Sofer; Team captain: Katherine Kelly Lang; Charity: Big Brothers & Big Sisters; Money Raised: $30,000
20	2	Australian Survivor: Asaga Tribe vs **Samatau Tribe**	16 October 2017	373,000
**Asaga Tribe**; Members: Luke Toki, Michelle Dougan, Jericho Malabonga, Sarah Tilleke; Team captain: Luke Toki; Charity: Autism Spectrum Australia; Money raised: $10,000; **Samatau Tribe**; Members: Locky Gilbert, Tara Pitt, Mark Herlaar, Aimee Stanton; Team captain: Locky Gilbert; Charities: Mates4Mates & Smiling For Smiddy; Money raised: $21,620
21	3	Bachelorettes vs **Bachelors**	23 October 2017	561,000
**Bachelorettes**; Members: Sophie Monk, Laura Byrne, Tara Pavlovic, Florence Moerenhout; Team captain: Sophie Monk; Charity: The Daniel Morcombe Foundation; Money raised: $10,000; **Bachelors** Members: Matty Johnson, Cameron Cranley, Clancy Ryan, Jake Ellis; Team captain: Matty Johnson; Charity: Starlight Children's Foundation; Money raised: $30,000; Note: The members are the former contestants from The Bachelor Australia and The Bachelorette Australia.
22	4	Radio Hosts: **Hughes** vs Langbroek	30 October 2017	439,000
**Hughes**; Members: Dave Hughes, Holly (wife), Mick (brother), Selina (sister-in-law); Team captain: Dave Hughes; Charity: The Mirabel Foundation; Money raised: $30,000; **Langbroek**; Members: Kate Langbroek, Pete (husband), Bronte (niece), John-Paul (brother); Team captain: Kate Langbroek; Charity: Children's Cancer Foundation; Money raised: $10,000
23	5	I'm a Celebrity...Get Me Out of Here!: **Curry** vs Donovan	6 November 2017	398,000
**Curry**; Members: Lisa Curry, Dane Swan, Keira Maguire, Kris Smith; Team captain: Lisa Curry; Charity: Aussie Helpers; Money raised: $30,000; **Donovan**; Members: Casey Donovan, Steve Price, Ash Pollard, Anthony Callea; Team captain: Casey Donovan; Charity: PANCARE Foundation; Money raised: $10,000
24	6	Comedians: Jayasinha vs **Scott**	13 November 2017	439,000
**Jayasinha**; Members: Dilruk Jayasinha, Emily Taheny, Dave Thornton, Susie Youssef; Team captain: Dilruk Jayasinha; Charity: Shake it Up Australia Foundation; Money raised: $10,000; **Scott**; Members: Denise Scott, Colin Lane, Genevieve Morris, Merrick Watts; Team captain: Denise Scott; Charity: Women's Cancer Foundation; Money raised: $21,430
25	7	Radio Hosts: **Kyle** vs Jackie O	27 November 2017	N/A
**Kyle**; Members: Kyle Sandilands, Imogen Anthony (girlfriend), Nima (houseboy), Tanya (radio listener); Team captain: Kyle Sandilands; Charity: Zambi Wildlife Retreat; Money raised: $30,000; **Jackie O**; Members: Jackie Last, Tony (dad), Kelly (sister-in-law), Martin (radio listener); Team captain: Jackie Last; Charity: White Ribbon Australia; Money raised: $10,000

=== Season 3 (2018) ===
Note: Winners are listed in bold

No. overall	No. in season	Teams	Original release date	Viewers
26	1	Bachelor in Paradise Australia: Bachelorettes vs **Bachelors**	18 March 2018	165,000
**Bachelorettes**; Team Members: Laurina Fleure, Tara Pavlovic, Florence Moerenhout, Lisa Hyde; Team captain: Laurina Fleure; Charity: Australian Cancer Research Foundation; Money Raised: $10,000; **Bachelors**; Team Members: Jarrod Woodgate, Apollo Jackson, Davey Lloyd, Michael Turnbull; Team captain: Jarrod Woodgate; Charity: Camp Quality; Money Raised: $30,000
27	2	Commonwealth Games: **Track & Field** vs Swimming	19 March 2018	204,000
**Track & Field**; Team Members: Jane Flemming, Jana Pitman, Tatiana Grigorieva, Matt Shirvington; Team captain: Jane Flemming; Charity: Humpty Dumpty Foundation; Money Raised: $30,000; **Swimming**; Team Members: Nicole Livingstone, Daniel Kowalski, Lisa Curry, Matt Welsh; Team captain: Nicole Livingstone; Charity: Ovarian Cancer Research Foundation; Money Raised: $10,000
28	3	MasterChef Australia: Shakers vs **Stirrers**	6 May 2018	160,000
**Shakers**; Team Members: Brent Owens, Billie McKay, Elena Duggan, Diana Chan; Team captain: Brent Owens; Charity: Outside The Locker Room Foundation; Money Raised: $10,000; **Stirrers**; Team Members: Julie Goodwin, Kate Bracks, Andy Allen, Emma Dean; Team captain: Julie Goodwin; Charity: Coast Shelter – Love Bites; Money Raised: $30,000
