= Bachelor in Paradise (Australian TV series) season 2 =

Bachelor in Paradise
- Season 2
- No. of episodes: 13

Release
- Original network: Network 10
- Original release: 9 April – 2 May 2019

Season chronology
- ← Previous; Season 1 Next → Season 3

The second season of Bachelor in Paradise Australia premiered on 9 April 2019.

The series concluded on 2 May 2019 with a reunion episode.

== Contestants ==
Strahan and Nation were revealed on 10 March 2019. An extra 13 contestants were announced on 14 March 2019, which results in 15 cast members being announced, with more intruders to be revealed later. On 7 April 2019, Favios and Krslovic were announced as contestants by Network 10, resulting in 17 cast members. In Episode 2 on 10 April 2019, Obrochta arrived on the show and Bourne & Lloyd were announced at the end of the episode. O'Brien was announced in advertisements by Network 10 before the episode in which she intruded in, while Moerenhout was leaked before the season began & confirmed by Network 10 in an announcement on 17 April 2019. Murger was announced at the end of episode 10, the episode before she appeared.

Name	Age	Occupation	Residence	From	Arrived	Eliminated
Alex Nation	27	Melbourne, Victoria	Venue Manager	The Bachelor Australia, season 4	Episode 1	Split
Bill Goldsmith	31	Melbourne, Victoria	Mechanical Plumber	The Bachelorette Australia, season 4	Episode 1	Split
Nathan Favro	23	Sydney, New South Wales	Carpenter	The Bachelorette Australia, season 4	Episode 1	Split
Tenille Favios	26	Brisbane, Queensland	Flight Attendant	The Bachelor Australia, season 6	Episode 6	Split
Davey Lloyd	29	Sydney, New South Wales	Carpenter	The Bachelorette Australia, season 1; Bachelor in Paradise Australia, season 1	Episode 3 (Note: Originally eliminated in episode 4, before returning in episode 10)	Split
Florence Moerenhout	29	Melbourne, Victoria	Brand Manager	The Bachelor Australia, season 5; Bachelor in Paradise Australia, season 1	Episode 6	Split
Alisha Aitken-Radburn	26	Sydney, New South Wales	Political Adviser	The Bachelor Australia, season 6	Episode 1	Episode 13 (Split)
Jules Bourne	25	Kiama, New South Wales	Former Infantry Corporal	The Bachelorette Australia, season 4	Episode 3	Episode 13 (Split)
Caroline Lunny	26	Holliston, Massachusetts, USA	Realtor	The Bachelor US, season 22; Bachelor in Paradise US, season 5	Episode 7	Episode 12 (Leave Together)
Alex Bordyukov	30	Detroit, Michigan, USA	Information Systems Supervisor	The Bachelorette US, season 13	Episode 1	Episode 12 (Leave Together)
Zoe O'Brien	29	Melbourne, Victoria	Pharmacist	The Bachelor Australia, season 2	Episode 5	Episode 12 (Split)
Mack Reid	37	Perth, Western Australia	Small Business Owner	The Bachelorette Australia, season 3; Bachelor in Paradise Australia, season 1	Episode 8	Episode 12 (Split)
Elora Murger	28	Noosa, Queensland	Fitness Trainer	The Bachelor Australia, season 5; Bachelor in Paradise Australia, season 1	Episode 11	Episode 11
Connor Obrochta	25	St Petersburg, Florida, USA	Fashion Designer	The Bachelorette US, season 14; Bachelor in Paradise US, season 5	Episode 2	Episode 11 (Leave Together)
Shannon Baff	26	Melbourne, Victoria	Car Care Consultant	The Bachelor Australia, season 6	Episode 1	Episode 11 (Leave Together)
Ivan Krslovic	30	Melbourne, Victoria	Commercial Painter	The Bachelorette Australia, season 4	Episode 4	Episode 10
Daniel Maguire	31	Vancouver, Canada	Personal Trainer	The Bachelorette US, season 12; Bachelor in Paradise US, season 3 & season 4; Bachelor in Paradise Australia, season 1	Episode 9	Episode 10
Cass Wood	24	Sydney, New South Wales	Student	The Bachelor Australia, season 6	Episode 1	Episode 10 (Split)
Richie Strahan	33	Perth, Western Australia	Rope Access Technician	The Bachelorette Australia, season 1; The Bachelor Australia, season 4	Episode 2	Episode 10 (Split)
Wes Ford	32	Gold Coast, Queensland	Heavy Machinery Operator	The Bachelorette Australia, season 4	Episode 8	Episode 8
Brittney Weldon	25	Gold Coast, Queensland	Housing Officer	The Bachelor Australia, season 6	Episode 1	Episode 6
Rachael Gouvignon	34	Perth, Western Australia	Support Worker	The Bachelor Australia, season 4; Bachelor in Paradise Australia, season 1	Episode 1	Episode 6
Brooke Blurton	24	Perth, Western Australia	Youth Worker	The Bachelor Australia, season 6	Episode 1	Episode 6 (Quit)
Paddy Colliar	28	Geelong, Victoria	Gym Manager	The Bachelorette Australia, season 4	Episode 1	Episode 4
James Trethewie	33	Sydney, New South Wales	Financial Advisor	The Bachelorette Australia, season 3	Episode 1	Episode 4 (Quit)
Vanessa Sunshine	28	Melbourne, Victoria	Legal Secretary	The Bachelor Australia, season 6	Episode 2	Episode 2
Cat Henesey-Smith	25	Brisbane, Queensland	Fashion Designer	The Bachelor Australia, season 6	Episode 1	Episode 2 (Quit)

== Elimination table ==
Place	Contestant	Cycle						
Place	Contestant	1 (Note: Episodes 1, 2 and 3)	2 (Note: Episode 3 and 4)	3 (Note: Episodes 5 and 6)	4 (Note: Episodes 7 and 8)	5 (Note: Episodes 9 and 10)	6 (Note: Episode 11)	7 (Note: Episodes 12 and 13)
1–6
1–6	Alex N	In	Date (Brooke, Bill & Nathan)	Date (Group)	Date (Bill)	In	Date (Elora)	Stay/Split (Bill)
1–6	Bill	In	Date (Brooke & Alex N)	Date (Florence)	Date (Alex N)	In	In	Stay/Split (Alex N)
1–6	Nathan	Date (Vanessa)	Date (Alex N & Brooke)	Date (Group)	Date (Shannon)	Date (Tenille)	In	Stay/Split (Tenille)
1–6	Tenille	Not in Paradise		Date (Ivan)	In	Date (Nathan)	In	Stay/Split (Nathan)
1–6	Davey	Not in Paradise	Out			Back	In	Split (Florence)
1–6	Florence	Not in Paradise		Date (Bill)	In	Date (Daniel)	In	Split (Davey)
7–8	Alisha	In	Date (Davey & Jules)	Date (Group)	In	Date (Daniel)	Date (Jules)	Split (Jules)
7–8	Jules	Not in Paradise	Date (Alisha)	In	Last	In	Date (Alisha)	Split (Alisha)
9–10	Caroline	Not in Paradise			Date (Richie)	In	In	Leave/Split (Alex B)
9–10	Alex B	In	In	In	In	In	In	Leave/Split (Caroline)
11–12	Zoe	Not in Paradise		Date (Connor)	In	In	Last	Split (Mack)
11–12	Mack	Not in Paradise			In	Last	In	Split (Zoe)
13	Elora	Not in Paradise					Out (Alex N)	
14–15	Connor	In	Last	Date (Group & Zoe)	In	In	Leave/Split (Shannon)	
14–15	Shannon	Date (Paddy)	In	In	Date (Nathan)	In	Leave/Split (Connor)	
16–17	Ivan	Not in Paradise	In	Date (Group & Tenille)	In	Out		
16–17	Daniel	Not in Paradise				Out (Alisha & Florence)		
18–19	Cass	In	In	In	In	Split (Richie)		
18–19	Richie	In	In	Date (Group)	Date (Caroline)	Split (Cass)		
20	Wesley	Not in Paradise			Out			
21–23	Brittney	In	In	Out				
21–23	Rachael	Last	In	Out				
21–23	Brooke	In	Date (Alex N & Bill)	Quit (Group)				
24	Paddy	Date (Shannon)	Out					
25	James	In	Quit					
26–27	Vanessa	Out (Nathan)						
26–27	Cat	Quit						

Colour Key
The contestant is male.
The contestant is female.
Date The contestant went on a date and gave out a rose at the rose ceremony.
Date The contestant went on a date and received a rose at the rose ceremony.
In The contestant gave or received a rose at the rose ceremony, thus remaining in the competition.
Last The contestant received the last rose.
Last The contestant went on a date and received the last rose.
Back The contestant returned and received a rose at the rose ceremony.
Out The contestant went on a date and was eliminated.
Out The contestant was eliminated.
Quit The contestant had a date and voluntarily left the show.
Quit The contestant voluntarily left the show.
Leave/Split The couple left the show together but later split.
Split The couple broke up and were eliminated.
Stay/Split The couple decided to stay together, but split after Bachelor in Paradise Australia ended.
Stay The couple decided to stay together and won the competition.

== Episodes ==
No. Overall	No. in Season	Original Air Date	Event & Description
17	Episode 1	9 April 2019	Arrivals: Shannon, Bill, Brooke, Paddy, Cass, James, Cat, Brittney, Nathan, Alex B, Rachael and Alisha entered Paradise. Shannon's Date: Paddy.
18	Episode 2 (Note: The rose ceremony ended abruptly in Episode 2 due to Cat quitting. The end of the ceremony was shown in Episode 3 but will be listed here as a part of Episode 2.)	10 April 2019	Arrivals: Richie, Vanessa, Alex N and Connor entered Paradise. Vanessa's Date: Nathan. Rose Ceremony: Connor gave his rose to Shannon; Alex B gave his rose to Brooke; James gave Alex N his rose; Paddy gave his rose to Alisha; Richie gave Cass his rose; Nathan gave his rose to Brittney; and Bill gave Rachael his rose. Vanessa did not receive a rose and was sent home. Departure: Cat quit and left Paradise.
19	Episode 3	11 April 2019	Arrivals: Davey and Jules entered Paradise. Brooke's Double Date: Alex N and Bill. Bill's Double Date: Brooke and Nathan. Davey's Date: Alisha.
20	Episode 4	16 April 2019	Arrivals: Ivan entered Paradise. Jules' Date: Alisha. Alex N's Date: Brooke. Rose Ceremony: Cass gave Richie her rose; Alisha gave her rose to Jules; Brittney gave Ivan her rose; Rachael gave her rose to Nathan; Alex N gave Bill her rose; Brooke gave her rose to Alex B; and Shannon gave her rose to Connor. Davey and Paddy did not receive roses and were sent home. Departure: James quit and left Paradise.
21	Episode 5	17 April 2019	Arrivals: Zoe entered Paradise. Group Date: Richie, Alisha, Ivan, Brooke, Alex N, Connor and Nathan. Zoe's Date: Connor.
22	Episode 6	18 April 2019	Arrivals: Florence and Tenille entered Paradise. Florence's Date: Bill. Tenille's Date: Ivan. Rose Ceremony: Connor gave his rose to Shannon; Nathan gave his rose to Zoe; Richie gave Cass his rose; Jules gave Alisha his rose; Ivan gave his rose to Tenille; Bill gave Alex N his rose; and Alex B gave his rose to Florence. Brittney and Rachael did not receive roses and were sent home. Departure: Brooke quit and left Paradise.
23	Episode 7	23 April 2019	Arrivals: Caroline entered Paradise. Bill's Date: Alex N. Caroline's Date: Richie
24	Episode 8	24 April 2019	Arrivals: Wes and Mack entered Paradise. Nathan's Date: Shannon. Rose Ceremony: Alex N gave her rose to Bill; Caroline gave Alex B her rose; Tenille gave her rose to Ivan; Cass gave her rose to Richie; Shannon gave Connor her rose; Florence gave Mack her rose; Zoe gave her rose to Nathan; and Alisha gave her rose to Jules. Wes did not receive a rose and was sent home.
25	Episode 9	25 April 2019	Arrivals: Daniel entered Paradise. Daniel's Date #1: Alisha. Daniel's Date #1: Florence.
26	Episode 10	28 April 2019	Return: Davey returned to Paradise. Tenille's Date: Nathan. Rose Ceremony: Florence gave Davey her rose; Alex N gave her rose to Bill; Alisha gave Jules her rose; Shannon gave her rose to Connor; Tenille gave her rose to Nathan; Caroline gave Alex B her; and Zoe gave her rose to Mack. Ivan and Daniel did not receive roses and were sent home. Departures: Richie and Cass split up and left Paradise.
27	Episode 11	30 April 2019	Arrivals: Elora entered Paradise. Elora's Date: Alex N. Date: Alisha and Jules. Rose Ceremony: Nathan gave his rose to Tenille; Jules gave his rose to Alisha; Bill gave Alex N his rose; Alex B gave Caroline his rose; Davey gave his rose to Florence; Caroline gave Alex B her; and Mack gave his rose to Zoe. Elora did not receive a rose and was sent home. Departures:Connor gave his rose to Shannon at the rose ceremony and asked her to leave Paradise with him to continue their relationship in the outside world.
28	Episode 12	1 May 2019	Departures: Zoe and Mack split up and left Paradise. Caroline and Alex B left Paradise to continue their relationship in the outside world.
29	Episode 13	2 May 2019	Departures: Alisha and Jules decided to split up and leave Paradise. Commitment Ceremony #1: Alex N and Bill chose to stay together. Commitment Ceremony #2: Nathan and Tenille chose to stay together. Commitment Ceremony #3: Florence and Davey chose to split up.

== Ratings ==
No.	Title	Air date	Timeslot	Overnight ratings		Consolidated ratings		Total viewers	Ref(s)
No.	Title	Air date	Timeslot	Viewers	Rank	Viewers	Rank	Total viewers	Ref(s)
1	Episode 1 – Launch	9 April 2019	Tuesday 7:30 pm	553,000	12	53,000	10	606,000	
2	Episode 2	10 April 2019	Wednesday 7:30 pm	539,000	13	62,000	12	601,000	
3	Episode 3	11 April 2019	Thursday 7:30 pm	489,000	10	67,000	9	556,000	
4	Episode 4	16 April 2019	Tuesday 7:30 pm	526,000	12	50,000	10	576,000	
5	Episode 5	17 April 2019	Wednesday 7:30 pm	520,000	12	54,000	11	574,000	
6	Episode 6	18 April 2019	Thursday 7:30 pm	406,000	12	77,000	10	483,000	
7	Episode 7	23 April 2019	Tuesday 7:30 pm	513,000	13	52,000	13	565,000	
8	Episode 8	24 April 2019	Wednesday 7:30 pm	454,000	14	52,000	12	506,000	
9	Episode 9	25 April 2019	Thursday 7:30 pm	433,000	13	62,000	11	495,000	
10	Episode 10	28 April 2019	Sunday 7:30 pm	427,000	11	59,000	10	486,000	
11	Episode 11	30 April 2019	Tuesday 8:40 pm	440,000	17	95,000	15	535,000	
12	Episode 12	1 May 2019	Wednesday 8:40 pm	434,000	19	87,000	18	521,000	
13	Grand Finale Tell All	2 May 2019	Thursday 8:40 pm	454,000 417,000	12 17	83,000 109,000	11 12	537,000 526,000	
