= Bachelor in Paradise (Australian TV series) season 1 =

Bachelor in Paradise
- Season 1
- No. of episodes: 16

Release
- Original network: Network Ten
- Original release: 25 March – 30 April 2018

Season chronology
- Next → Season 2

The first season of Bachelor in Paradise Australia premiered on 25 March 2018.

== Contestants ==
The first batch of contestants were revealed on 25 March 2018, but only 14 contestants were confirmed. An additional 14 contestants, including four international contestants, have been revealed, resulting in 28 contestants.

Name	Age	Hometown	Occupation	From	Arrived	Eliminated
Sam Cochrane	34	Sydney, New South Wales	Voice Over Artist	The Bachelorette Australia, season 3	Episode 2	Engaged (Split June 2018)
Tara Pavlovic	27	Gold Coast, Queensland	Nanny	The Bachelor Australia, season 5	Episode 1	Engaged (Split June 2018)
Jarrod Woodgate	32	Melbourne, Victoria	Vineyard Manager	The Bachelorette Australia, season 3	Episode 3	Relationship (Split August 2019)
Keira Maguire	31	Sydney, New South Wales	Account Manager	The Bachelor Australia, season 4	Episode 1	Relationship (Split August 2019)
Grant Kemp	29	Los Angeles, California	Firefighter	The Bachelorette US, season 12; Bachelor in Paradise US, season 3	Episode 5	Split
Ali Oetjen	31	Adelaide, South Australia	Real Estate Agent	The Bachelor Australia, season 1	Episode 3	Split
Jake Ellis	31	Gold Coast, Queensland	Sales Professional	The Bachelorette Australia, season 2	Episode 1	Episode 16 (Split)
Megan Marx	29	Geraldton, Western Australia	Health Promotions Officer/Model	The Bachelor Australia, season 4	Episode 3	Episode 16 (Split)
Thomas Perass	31	Regina, Canada	International model	The Bachelorette Canada, season 1	Episode 10 (Note: Originally eliminated in episode 10, before returning in episode 11)	Episode 14 (Split)
Rachael Gouvignon	33	Perth, Western Australia	Support Worker	The Bachelor Australia, season 4	Episode 11	Episode 14 (Split)
Apollo Jackson	25	Gold Coast, Queensland	Magician	The Bachelorette Australia, season 3	Episode 9	Episode 14 (Quit)
Simone Ormesher	26	Melbourne, Victoria	Office Administrator	The Bachelor Australia, season 5	Episode 7	Episode 14 (Quit)
Jared Haibon	29	Warwick, Rhode Island, US	Actor & Bartender	The Bachelorette US, season 11; Bachelor in Paradise US, season 2; Bachelor in Paradise, season 3	Episode 6	Episode 14 (Quit)
Elora Murger	27	Sydney, New South Wales	Fitness Trainer	The Bachelor Australia, season 5	Episode 7	Episode 14
Florence Moerenhout	28	Melbourne, Victoria	Brand Manager	The Bachelor Australia, season 5	Episode 1 (Note: Originally eliminated in episode 4, before returning in episode 13)	Episode 14
Leah Costa	25	Melbourne, Victoria	Architecture Student	The Bachelor Australia, season 5	Episode 1	Episode 13 (Quit)
Eden Schwencke	34	Perth, Western Australia	Scaffolder	The Bachelorette Australia, season 3	Episode 1	Episode 13 (Quit)
Sasha Zhuravlyova	33	Melbourne, Victoria	Executive Assistant	The Bachelor Australia, season 4	Episode 11	Episode 12
Luke McLeod	33	Sydney, New South Wales	Business Culture Consultant	The Bachelorette Australia, season 3	Episode 1	Episode 10 (Quit)
Lisa Hyde	31	Sydney, New South Wales	Fashion Designer	The Bachelor Australia, season 2	Episode 1	Episode 10 (Quit)
Michael Turnbull	36	Brisbane, Queensland	Realtor	The Bachelorette Australia, season 1	Episode 1	Episode 10 (Quit)
Nina Rolleston	30	Brisbane, Queensland	Wedding Planner	The Bachelor Australia, season 3	Episode 1	Episode 8
Laurina Fleure	34	Melbourne, Victoria	Model	The Bachelor Australia, season 2	Episode 2	Episode 7 (Quit)
Daniel Maguire	32	Vancouver, Canada	Model	The Bachelorette US, season 12; Bachelor in Paradise US, season 3; Bachelor in Paradise US, season 4	Episode 5	Episode 6
Blake Colman	30	Perth, Western Australia	Investor/Entrepreneur	The Bachelorette Australia, season 3	Episode 1	Episode 6
Mackane Reid	35	Perth, Western Australia	Small Business Owner	The Bachelorette Australia, season 3	Episode 1	Episode 6
Davey Lloyd	28	Sydney, New South Wales	Carpenter	The Bachelorette Australia, season 1	Episode 1	Episode 2
Brett Moore	28	Perth, Western Australia	Personal Trainer	The Bachelorette Australia, season 3	Episode 1	Episode 2

== Elimination table ==
Place	Contestant	Week							
Place	Contestant	1 (Note: Episodes 1 and 2)	2 (Note: Episodes 3 and 4)	3 (Note: Episodes 5 and 6)	4 (Note: Episodes 7 and 8)	5 (Note: Episodes 9 and 10)	6 (Note: Episodes 11 and 12)	7 (Note: Episodes 13 and 14)	8 (Note: Episodes 15 and 16)
1–8	Tara	In	In	Date (Sam)	In	In	In	Date (Sam)	Engaged/Split (Sam)
1–8	Sam	In	In	Date (Tara)	In	Date (Thomas)	In	Date (Tara)	Engaged/Split (Tara)
1–8	Keira	In	Date (Michael)	In	Last	In	Date (Jarrod)	In	Stay/Split (Jarrod)
1–8	Jarrod	Not in Paradise	Date (Ali)	Last	Date (Simone)	Date (Thomas)	Date (Keira)	In	Stay/Split (Keira)
1–8	Ali	Not in Paradise	Date (Jarrod)	In	In	In	In	In	Stay/Split (Grant)
1–8	Grant	Not in Paradise		Date (Leah)	In	In	In	In	Stay/Split (Ali)
1–8	Megan	Not in Paradise	Date (Jake)	Date (Jared)	In	In	Date (Thomas)	In	Split (Jake)
1–8	Jake	Date (Florence)	Date (Megan)	In	In	In	In	In	Split (Megan)
9–10	Rachael	Not in Paradise					Date (Jared)	Split (Thomas)	
9–10	Thomas	Not in Paradise				Out (Bro Date)	Back (Megan)	Split (Rachael)	
11–12	Simone	Not in Paradise			Date (Jarrod)	Date (Apollo)	In	Leave/Split (Apollo)	
11–12	Apollo	Not in Paradise				Date	In	Leave/Split (Simone)	
13–14	Elora	Not in Paradise			Date (Michael)	Date	In	Out	
13–14	Florence	Date (Jake)	Out					Out	
15	Jared	Not in Paradise		Date (Megan)	In	In	Date (Rachael)	Quit	
16	Leah	Date (Davey)	In	Date (Grant)	In	In	Last	Quit	
17	Eden	In	In	In	In	Date (Elora)	In	Quit	
18	Sasha	Not in Paradise					Out		
19–20	Luke	In	In	In	In	Leave/Split (Lisa)			
19–20	Lisa	In	In	In	In	Leave/Split (Luke)			
21	Michael	In	Date (Keira)	In	Date (Elora)	Quit			
22	Nina	In	In	Date (Daniel)	Out				
23	Laurina	Date (Blake)	In	In	Quit				
24–26	Daniel	Not in Paradise		Out (Nina)					
24–26	Blake	Date (Laurina)	In	Out					
24–26	Mack	In	In	Out					
27–28	Davey	Out (Leah)							
27–28	Brett	Out							

Color Key
The contestant is male.
The contestant is female.
Date The contestant went on a date and gave out a rose at the rose ceremony.
Date The contestant went on a date and received a rose at the rose ceremony.
In The contestant gave or received a rose at the rose ceremony, thus remaining in the competition.
Last The contestant received the last rose.
Last The contestant went on a date and received the last rose.
Back The contestant returned, went on a date and gave out a rose.
Out The contestant went on a date and was eliminated.
Out The contestant was eliminated.
Out The contestant returned and was eliminated.
Quit The contestant had a date and voluntarily left the show.
Quit The contestant voluntarily left the show.
Leave/Split The couple left the show together but later split.
Split The couple broke up and were eliminated.
Stay/Split The couple decided to stay together, but split after Bachelor in Paradise Australia ended.
Stay The couple decided to stay together and won the competition.
Engaged/Split The couple was engaged, but split after Bachelor in Paradise Australia ended.

== Episodes ==
No. Overall	No. in Season	Original Air Date	Event & Description
1	Episode 1	25 March 2018	Arrivals: Tara, Michael, Luke, Lisa, Leah, Davey, Brett, Nina, Eden, Florence, Mack, Blake, Jake and Keira entered Paradise. Davey's Date: Leah. Jake's Date: Florence.
2	Episode 2	26 March 2018	Arrivals: Sam and Laurina entered Paradise. Laurina's Date: Blake. Rose Ceremony: Nina gave her rose to Eden; Leah gave Mack her rose; Keira gave her rose to Sam; Lisa gave her rose to Luke; Laurina gave Blake her rose; Tara gave Michael her rose; Florence gave her rose to Jake. Brett and Davey did not receive roses, and were sent home.
3	Episode 3	2 April 2018	Arrivals: Jarrod, Ali and Megan entered Paradise. Keira's Date: Michael. Megan's Date: Jake.
4	Episode 4	3 April 2018	Jarrod's Date: Ali. Rose Ceremony: Mack gave his rose to Ali; Jarrod gave his rose to Keira; Eden gave Nina his rose; Luke gave Lisa his rose; Blake gave his rose to Laurina; Sam gave his rose to Tara; Michael gave Leah his rose; and Jake gave his rose to Megan. Florence did not receive a rose and was sent home.
5	Episode 5	8 April 2018	Arrivals: Grant and Daniel entered Paradise. Grant's Date: Leah. Daniel's Date: Nina. Sam's Date: Tara.
6	Episode 6	9 April 2018	Arrivals: Jared entered Paradise. Jared's Date: Megan. Rose Ceremony: Leah gave her rose to Michael; Tara gave Sam her rose; Lisa gave Luke her rose; Ali gave her rose to Grant; Nina gave her rose to Eden; Laurina gave Jared her rose; Megan gave her rose to Jake; and Keira gave Jarrod her rose. Mack, Blake and Daniel did not receive roses, and were sent home.
7	Episode 7	10 April 2018	Arrivals: Elora and Simone entered Paradise. Elora's Date: Michael. Departure: Laurina quit and left Paradise.
8	Episode 8	11 April 2018	Simone's Date: Jarrod. Rose Ceremony: Eden gave Elora his rose; Grant gave his rose to Ali; Sam gave Tara his rose; Jake gave his rose to Megan; Jared gave his rose to Leah; Jarrod gave Simone his rose; Michael gave Lisa his rose; and Luke gave his rose to Keira. Nina did not receive a rose and was sent home.
9	Episode 9	15 April 2018	Arrivals: Apollo entered Paradise. Apollo's Date: Simone. Eden's Date: Elora.
10	Episode 10	16 April 2018	Arrivals: Thomas entered Paradise. Elora's Date: Apollo. Thomas' Date: After being rejected by all of the female contestants, Jarrod, Sam and Apollo joined Thomas on a "Bro Date". Rose Ceremony: Simone gave her rose to Apollo; Leah gave Jared her rose; Tara gave her rose to Sam; Ali gave Grant her rose; Keira gave her rose to Jarrod; Megan gave her rose to Jake; and Elora gave Eden her rose. Thomas did not receive a rose, and was sent home. Departures: Michael quit and left Paradise. Lisa and Luke left Paradise to continue their relationship in the outside world.
11	Episode 11	17 April 2018	Arrivals: Sasha and Rachael entered Paradise. Keira's Date: Jarrod. Return: Thomas returned to Paradise. Thomas' Date: Megan.
12	Episode 12	18 April 2018	Rachael's Date: Jared. Rose Ceremony: Apollo gave Simone his rose; Sam gave his rose to Tara; Grant gave his rose to Ali; Jarrod gave Keira his rose; Thomas gave Rachael his rose; Jake gave his rose to Megan; Eden gave Elora his rose; and Jared gave his rose to Leah. Sasha did not receive a rose, and was sent home.
13	Episode 13	22 April 2018	Thomas' Date: Rachael. Return: Florence returned to Paradise. Tara's Date: Sam. Departures: Eden and Leah quit and left Paradise.
14	Episode 14	23 April 2018	Rose Ceremony: Grant gave his rose to Ali; Thomas gave Rachael his rose; Jarrod gave his rose to Keira; Sam gave Tara his rose; Jake gave his rose to Megan; and Apollo gave his rose to Simone. Elora and Florence did not receive roses, and were sent home. Departures: Jared quit during the rose ceremony, forfeiting his rose. Apollo and Simone left Paradise to continue their relationship in the outside world.
15	Episode 15	29 April 2018	Date #1: Jarrod and Keira. Date #2: Ali and Grant. Date #3: Sam and Tara. Date #4: Jake and Megan.
16	Episode 16	30 April 2018	Departures: Jake and Megan decided to split up and leave Paradise. Commitment Ceremony #1: Jarrod and Keira chose to stay together. Commitment Ceremony #2: Ali and Grant chose to stay together, but split before the show aired. Commitment Ceremony #3: Sam proposed to Tara and she accepted.

== Ratings ==
No.	Title	Air date	Timeslot	Overnight ratings		Consolidated ratings		Total viewers	Ref(s)
No.	Title	Air date	Timeslot	Viewers	Rank	Viewers	Rank	Total viewers	Ref(s)
1	Episode 1	25 March 2018	Sunday 7:30 pm	750,000	4	74,000	3	824,000	
2	Episode 2	26 March 2018	Monday 7:30 pm	656,000	14	70,000	12	726,000	
3	Episode 3	2 April 2018	Monday 7:30 pm	707,000	9	53,000	8	760,000	
4	Episode 4	3 April 2018	Tuesday 7:30 pm	707,000	9	46,000	8	753,000	
5	Episode 5	8 April 2018	Sunday 7:30 pm	611,000	8	56,000	6	667,000	
6	Episode 6	9 April 2018	Monday 7:30 pm	673,000	10	62,000	10	735,000	
7	Episode 7	10 April 2018	Tuesday 7:30 pm	676,000	9	54,000	9	730,000	
8	Episode 8	11 April 2018	Wednesday 7:30 pm	736,000	7	51,000	6	787,000	
9	Episode 9	15 April 2018	Sunday 7:30 pm	629,000	9	64,000	6	693,000	
10	Episode 10	16 April 2018	Monday 7:30 pm	676,000	11	60,000	11	736,000	
11	Episode 11	17 April 2018	Tuesday 7:30 pm	660,000	10	71,000	9	731,000	
12	Episode 12	18 April 2018	Wednesday 7:30 pm	630,000	9	50,000	9	680,000	
13	Episode 13	22 April 2018	Sunday 7:30 pm	669,000	7	61,000	6	730,000	
14	Episode 14	23 April 2018	Monday 7:30 pm	666,000	10	58,000	10	724,000	
15	Episode 15	29 April 2018	Sunday 7:30 pm	627,000	9	44,000	8	671,000	
16	Grand Final The Proposal	30 April 2018	Monday 7:30 pm Monday 8:45 pm	661,000 774,000	12 8	39,000 64,000	12 8	700,000 838,000	
