= Warner Bros. International Television Production =

International television production studio, subsidiary of Warner Bros

Warner Bros. International Television Production Limited
- Logo used since 2023
- Type: Subsidiary
- Industry: Television production
- Founded: 2009; 17 years ago
- Headquarters: Chiswick Park Building 2, 566 Chiswick High Road, London, England
- Area served: Worldwide
- Products: Television programs
- Owner: Skydance
- Parent: Warner Bros. Television Studios
- Subsidiaries: Warner Bros. Television Studios UK; Warner Bros. Television Studios Spain; Warner Bros. Television Studios Australia; Warner Bros. International Television Production Netherlands; Warner Bros. International Television Production New Zealand
- Website: Official website Warner Bros Television Division

Warner Bros. International Television Production (WBITVP) is the global television production arm of Warner Bros. Television Studios. The division was formed in 2009 to produce original programming or local adaptations of Warner Bros. formats in non-U.S. territories. Warner Bros. International Television Production has also acquired numerous production companies including Shed Media in the United Kingdom and BlazHoffski Holding B.V. (including Dahl TV and BlazHoffski Levy Productions) in the Netherlands and Belgium. In 2014, Warner Bros. acquired Netherlands-based Eyeworks and its global subsidiaries outside North America in a US$270 million deal, giving Warner Bros. businesses in 15 new territories.

== History ==
In late-March 2007, Warner Bros. International Television Production shuttered down its London-based British international formats division that handled the licensing of its television formats to international countries with the London team disbanded and exiting the shuttered London formats division.

On 9 August 2009, Warner Bros. International Television Production launched its own international production division dedicated to producing local adaptations from its programming library including producing its own original production content called with the new division appointing Ronald Goes to became head of the new production division.

In August 2010, Warner Bros. International Television Production entered the British television production activities by taking a 55% majority stake in British independent television production and distribution company Shed Media Group alongside its production companies (namely Ricochet, Wall to Wall Media and Twenty Twenty Television) to expand Warner Bros.' international production business, giving Warner Bros. their own British television production subsidiary.

In late-September 2011, Warner Bros. International Television Production announced that they've taken a majority stake in Belgium/Netherlands-based production company BlazHoffski alongside the latter's Dutch production subsidiary Dahl TV (which they brought back in 2010) as part of Warner Bros.' strategy to further expand its international television production operations and boost its profile as a producer of local scripted and non-scripted content with Warner Bros. gaining control and taken over distribution of BlazHoffski's content formats.

In June 2012 after WBITVP's former senior VP of sales and acquisitions Chris Bonney had left the company to join Cineflix Media and WBITVP's former VP of European sales Claudia Danser had depatured to join Shine Group as MD of international IPs, Warner Bros. International Television Productions had appointed former Zodiak Media head of format acquisitions Ilan Astrung as VP of acquisitions with Warner Bros. International Television Production had created a newly formed position for Asrtrung as Ilan Astrung had been served as vice president of acquisitions and wouls oversee third party representation and first look deals from WBITVP, while WBITVP had appointed former NBCUniversal International Television Production vice president of format sales & production Charlotte Raben who have been named as vice president of format sales and would oversee Warner Bros. International Television Productions' scripted & unscripted formats from its London office and to expand WBITVP's operations in France Germany and Benelux, assuming third party representation & first look deals.

In January 2014, Warner Bros. International Television Production announced that they were in exclusive negotiations to acquire Dutch international production group Eyeworks in order to expand Warner Bros. International Television Production's global production activities. A month later on 11 February of that same year, Warner Bros. International Television Production announced that they had made an agreement to purchase Dutch international production group Eyeworks and their businesses outside of the United States to expand Warner Bros.' international television production operations overseas. The deal could also bring Warner Bros. International Television Productions to other countries and would launch local operations in those countries. The deal will exclude Eyeworks' American division Eyeworks USA which will become independent along with founder and CEO of Eyeworks Reinout Oerlemans will step down after the purchase. Four months later in June of that same year, Warner Bros. International Television Production and their parent company Warner Bros. Television Group had announced that they've completed their acquisition of Dutch international production group Eyeworks and its international operations outside the US expanding Warner Bros. International Television Production's operations and their TV production units into 13 additional countries with Warner Bros. taking over Eyeworks' international distribution activities along with founder and CEO Reinout Oerlemans exited Eyeworks. However, it excluded Eyeworks' American division Eyeworks USA which had been split from its parent company Eyeworks and had turned into an independent production company with former founder and CEO of Eyeworks Reinout Oerlemans moved to the United States and taken over Eyeworks' independent American division.

In February 2017, Warner Bros. International Television Production under its British production arm Warner Bros. Television Production UK announced that its managing directors Clare Hungate and Nick Emmerson had departed the British television production company Warner Bros. Television Production UK after three years of overseeing the group beginning in 2014. Three days later on the 13th of that month, Warner Bros. International Television Production had taken over the five British production subsidiaries of its British production arm Warner Bros. Television Production UK which were Wall to Wall Media, Twenty Twenty Television, Renegade Pictures, Ricochet and Yalli Productions into the London-based international TV production company Warner Bros. International Television Production following the departure of Clare Hungate and Nick Emmerson and the restructuring of its British production arm's operations.

In February 2025, Warner Bros. International Television Production entered the Italian television production activities by opening an Italian production business based in Milan as their new territory with Warner Bros. International Television Production Spain's Stefano Torrisi leading the new production division as their MD.

Following Warner Bros. Discovery's split announcement during June of that year, it was revealed on July 29, 2025 that Warner Bros. International Television Production would be transferred from American television production division Warner Bros. Television Group to Discovery Global as Warner Bros. retains its US television studios. However, on February 27, 2026, Paramount Skydance announced its intent to acquire the entirety of WBD, resulting in the split to be completely scrapped. On October 6, 2026, WBITVP was moved back to the Warner Bros. Television Group after the merger of Paramount and WBD is complete, which now known as Skydance.

In October of that year when Skydance had created & formed its Skydance TV Studios division, Warner Bros. International Television Productions have been moved to the newly established Skydance TV Studios arm of Skydance following the completion of Warner Bros. Discovery by Paramount Skydance with Warner Bros. International Televusion Production unit now being overseen by chairman and CEO of its former parent Warner Bros. Television Group, Channing Dungey, while WBITVP's president & CEO Ronald Goes have remained president of the unit following the move of Warner Bros. Intetnational Television Production to Skydance's newly established Skydance TV Studios division.

== Warner Bros. International Television Distribution ==
Warner Bros. International Television Distribution was founded in 1989 after the purchase of Lorimar Telepictures by Warner Communications. It distributes Warner Bros., HBO, and Turner content to the international television marketplace (broadcast, pay cable, basic cable, satellite, pay-per-view, subscription video-on-demand, digital platforms, etc.).

== Global divisions ==
=== Australia ===
Former logo used until 2023

Warner Bros. International Television Production Australia (WBITPA) was founded in 2004 as Eyeworks Australia before being rebranded in 2014.

As Eyeworks Australia, shows produced include Celebrity Splash, Being Lara Bingle, Gangs of Oz and Territory Cops. Following the rebrand, WBITPA began producing The Bachelor Australia from its fourth season, spin-offs The Bachelorette Australia from its second season & Bachelor in Paradise, as well as First Dates, the eighth season of Who Do You Think You Are?, Back in Time for Dinner, the sixteenth season of Dancing with the Stars and The Masked Singer Australia.

=== New Zealand ===
Warner Bros. International Television Production New Zealand produces some of New Zealand’s most successful entertainment shows including RuPaul's Drag Race Down Under, The Bachelor NZ, The Bachelorette NZ, The Block NZ, Celebrity Treasure Island, Glow Up, House of Drag and The Great Kiwi Bake Off.

Factual and documentary productions include Lost and Found, David Lomas Investigates, All or Nothing: New Zealand All Blacks and Heaven and Hell - The Centrepoint Story.

=== Spain ===
The Spanish subsidiary was acquired as part of the Eyeworks takeover in 2014. Eyeworks España was renamed Warner Bros. International Television Production España in December 2015.

Shows produced by Warner Bros. International Television Production España include Juego de juegos, based on Ellen's Game of Games; First Dates, based on the British show of the same name; Pesadilla en la Cocina, based on Ramsay's Kitchen Nightmares; ¿Quién quiere ser millonario? (España), based on the British Who Wants to Be a Millionaire?; and Ven a cenar conmigo, based on the British Come Dine with Me. Along with Mediaset España and Netflix, the company also co-produced Brigada Costa del Sol.

=== United Kingdom ===
Shed Productions was established in 1998, was acquired by Time Warner in 2010, and was rebranded as Warner Bros. Television Productions UK in June 2014 (which was later renamed as Warner Bros. Television Studios UK in 2020).

== See also ==
- List of Warner Bros. Discovery television programs#Warner Bros. International Television Production
