= The Bachelorette (Australian TV series) season 6 =

The Bachelorette
- Season 6
- Starring: Becky Miles; Elly Miles
- Presented by: Osher Günsberg
- No. of contestants: 20
- Winners: Pete Mann; Frazer Neate
- Runners-up: Adrian Baena; Joe Woodbury
- No. of episodes: 10

Release
- Original network: Network 10
- Original release: 7 October – 5 November 2020

Season chronology
- ← Previous; Season 5 Next → Season 7

The sixth season of The Bachelorette Australia premiered on Wednesday, 7 October 2020. In an Australian first, the season features Newcastle, New South Wales sisters Elly Miles, a 25-year-old nurse, and Becky Miles, a 30-year-old defence contracting specialist as Bachelorettes. Together, they will court 20 men. Elly previously appeared on the seventh season of The Bachelor Australia, where she finished in fifth place.

== Contestants ==
The season began with 20 contestants, who were revealed on 5 October 2020.

| Name | Age | Hometown | Occupation | Bachelorette | Eliminated |
|---|---|---|---|---|---|
| Pete Mann | 34 | Adelaide, South Australia | Café Owner | Becky | Winner |
| Frazer Neate | 28 | Brisbane, Queensland | Concretor | Elly | Winner |
| Adrian Baena | 26 | Sunshine Coast, Queensland | Kitesurfing Instructor | Becky | Becky's runner-up |
| Joe Woodbury | 25 | Newcastle, New South Wales | Labourer/NRL player | Elly | Elly's runner-up |
| Adam Todd | 24 | Perth, Western Australia | Geologist | Elly | Episode 9 |
| Shannon Karaka | 30 | Sydney, New South Wales | Sales | Becky | Episode 8 |
| James Boggia | 28 | Sunshine Coast, Queensland | Pro Wakeboarder | Elly | Episode 7 |
| Sam Vescio | 35 | Sydney, New South Wales | Lawyer | Becky | Episode 7 |
| Damien Stone | 31 | Melbourne, Australia | Property Valuer | Becky | Episode 6 |
| Agostino "Aggi" Guardiani | 30 | Melbourne, Australia | Business Owner | Becky | Episode 5 |
| Pascal Wallace | 33 | Sydney, New South Wales | CEO | Becky | Episode 4 |
| James "Harry" Harris | 35 | Adelaide, South Australia | Carpenter | Elly | Episode 4 (Quit) |
| Andrew Thomas | 30 | Adelaide, South Australia | Tour Guide/Voice Actor | Elly | Episode 3 |
| Rudy El Kholti | 30 | Sydney, New South Wales | Personal Trainer | Becky | Episode 3 |
| Saj Bakhsh | 25 | Adelaide, South Australia | Personal Trainer | Becky | Episode 3 |
| Trent Cray | 31 | Perth, Western Australia | Finance Broker | Elly | Episode 3 |
| Jake Ricciardo | 26 | Perth, Western Australia | Explosives Handler | Elly | Episode 2 |
| Nick Chamberlain | 25 | Sydney, New South Wales | Support Worker | Elly | Episode 1 |
| Samuel Minkin | 27 | Sydney, New South Wales | Musculoskeletal Therapist | Elly | Episode 1 |
| AB Sow | 27 | Brisbane, Queensland | Filmmaker/Dancer | Becky | Episode 1 (Quit) |

== Call-Out Order ==
Elly & Becky's call-out order
| # | Bachelors | Episode | | | | | | | | |
| # | Bachelors | 1 | 2 | 3 | 4 (Note: The rose ceremony was cancelled after Harry left and Pascal was eliminated during the cocktail party. Therefore, the remaining men are listed in alphabetical order.) | 5 | 6 | 7 | 8/9 | 10 |
|---|---|---|---|---|---|---|---|---|---|---|
| 1 | Sam | Harry | Shannon | Frazer | Pete | Adam | Pete | Adrian | Pete | Pete |
| 2 | Frazer | Shannon | Joe | Adam | Adam | Sam | Frazer | Frazer | Adrian | Frazer |
| 3 | AB | Pete | Adrian | Sam | Adrian | Joe | James | Pete | Frazer | Adrian |
| 4 | Andrew | Frazer | Frazer | Joe | Agostino | Adrian | Adrian | Joe | Joe | Joe |
| 5 | Trent | Sam | Pete | Pete | Damien | Damien | Adam | Shannon | Adam | |
| 6 | Pascal | Adam | Adam | Shannon | Frazer | Pete | Joe | Adam | Shannon | |
| 7 | Agostino | Rudy | Sam | James | James | Shannon | Sam | James; Sam | | |
| 8 | Pete | Joe | Damien | Pascal | Joe | Frazer | Shannon | James; Sam | | |
| 9 | Nick | Jake | Saj | Agostino | Sam | James | Damien | | | |
| 10 | James | Pascal | Rudy | Damien | Shannon | Agostino | | | | |
| 11 | Adrian | Adrian | Trent | Harry | Pascal | | | | | |
| 12 | Jake | Saj | James | Adrian | Harry | | | | | |
| 13 | Harry | James | Andrew | Andrew; Rudy; Saj; Trent | | | | | | |
| 14 | Shannon | Agostino | Pascal | Andrew; Rudy; Saj; Trent | | | | | | |
| 15 | Saj | Andrew | Agostino | Andrew; Rudy; Saj; Trent | | | | | | |
| 16 | Damien | Trent | Harry | Andrew; Rudy; Saj; Trent | | | | | | |
| 17 | Rudy | Damien | Jake | | | | | | | |
| 18 | Adam | Nick; Samuel | | | | | | | | |
| 19 | Samuel | Nick; Samuel | | | | | | | | |
| 20 | Joe | AB | | | | | | | | |

Colour Key

The contestant received the first impression "country rose", having the opportunity to go on the first double date and choose a Bachelor to join him on the date.
The contestant received a rose during a date.
The contestant received a rose outside of a date or the rose ceremony.
The contestant was eliminated outside the rose ceremony.
The contestant was eliminated.
The contestant quit the competition.
The contestant won the competition.

== Episodes ==
=== Episode 1 ===
Original airdate: 7 October 2020

| Event | Description |
|---|---|
| Country Rose | Harry |
| Rose ceremony | Nick & Samuel were eliminated. AB quit during the rose ceremony. |

=== Episode 2 ===
Original airdate: 8 October 2020

| Event | Description |
|---|---|
| Country Rose Date | Harry & Shannon |
| Group Date | Damien, Frazer, Pascal, Agostino, Pete, Jake, James, Adrian, Joe, Adam & Saj |
| Rose ceremony | Jake was eliminated. |

=== Episode 3 ===
Original airdate: 14 October 2020

| Event | Description |
|---|---|
| Elly's Single Date | Frazer |
| Group Date | Agostino, Damien, Joe, Rudy, Sam, Andrew, Harry, James, Adrian |
| One-on-One Time | Sam & Joe |
| Rose ceremony | Andrew, Rudy, Saj & Trent were eliminated. |

=== Episode 4 ===
Original airdate: 15 October 2020

| Event | Description |
|---|---|
| Becky's Single Date | Pete |
| Elly's Mini Date | James |
| Group Date | Pascal, Damien, James, Harry, Adrian, Adam, Shannon & Frazer |
| Rose ceremony | Harry quit during the cocktail party. Pascal was eliminated during the cocktail party. No formal rose ceremony was held |

=== Episode 5 ===
Original airdate: 21 October 2020

| Event | Description |
|---|---|
| Group Date | Everyone |
| Elly's Single Date | Adam |
| Becky's Mini Date | Sam |
| Rose ceremony | Agostino was eliminated. |

=== Episode 6 ===
Original airdate: 22 October 2020

| Event | Description |
|---|---|
| Double Date | Frazer & Pete |
| Group Date | Everyone |
| One-on-One Time | Adrian |
| Rose ceremony | Damien was eliminated. |

=== Episode 7 ===
Original airdate: 28 October 2020

| Event | Description |
|---|---|
| Group Date | Everyone |
| One-on-One Time | Shannon & Joe |
| Becky’s Single Date | Adrian |
| Rose ceremony | James and Sam were eliminated. |

=== Episode 8 ===
Original airdate: 29 October 2020

| Event | Description |
|---|---|
| Elly's Hometown #1 | Joe |
| Becky's Hometown #1 | Pete |
| Becky's Hometown #2 | Shannon |
| Elimination | Shannon was eliminated on his Hometown Date. |

=== Episode 9 ===
Original airdate: 4 November 2020

| Event | Description |
|---|---|
| Elly's Hometown #2 | Frazer |
| Becky's Hometown #3 | Adrian |
| Elly's Hometown #3 | Adam |
| Rose ceremony | Adam was eliminated. |

=== Episode 10 ===
Original airdate: 5 November 2020

| Event | Description |
|---|---|
| Elly's Final Date #1 | Joe |
| Becky's Final Date #1 | Pete |
| Elly's Final Date #2 | Frazer |
| Becky's Final Date #2 | Adrian |
| Becky's Final Decision | Pete is the winner. |
| Elly's Final Decision | Frazer is the winner. |

== Ratings ==
| No. | Title | Air date | Timeslot | Overnight ratings | | Consolidated ratings | | Total viewers | Ref(s) |
| No. | Title | Air date | Timeslot | Viewers | Rank | Viewers | Rank | Total viewers | Ref(s) |
|---|---|---|---|---|---|---|---|---|---|
| 1 | Episode 1 | 7 October 2020 | Wednesday 7:30 pm | 628,000 | 9 | 41,000 | 8 | 669,000 | |
| 2 | Episode 2 | 8 October 2020 | Thursday 7:30 pm | 543,000 | 8 | 66,000 | 8 | 609,000 | |
| 3 | Episode 3 | 14 October 2020 | Wednesday 7:30 pm | 468,000 | 15 | 62,000 | 13 | 530,000 | |
| 4 | Episode 4 | 15 October 2020 | Thursday 7:30 pm | 534,000 | 8 | 86,000 | 8 | 620,000 | |
| 5 | Episode 5 | 21 October 2020 | Wednesday 7:30 pm | 464,000 | 13 | 45,000 | 13 | 507,000 | |
| 6 | Episode 6 | 22 October 2020 | Thursday 7:30 pm | 499,000 | 9 | 65,000 | 8 | 565,000 | |
| 7 | Episode 7 | 28 October 2020 | Wednesday 7:30 pm | 487,000 | 14 | —N/a | —N/a | 487,000 | |
| 8 | Episode 8 | 29 October 2020 | Thursday 7:30 pm | 441,000 | 13 | —N/a | —N/a | 441,000 | |
| 9 | Episode 9 | 4 November 2020 | Wednesday 7:30 pm | 470,000 | 12 | —N/a | —N/a | 470,000 | |
| 10 | Grand Finale Final Decision | 5 November 2020 | Thursday 7:30 pm Thursday 8:30 pm | 500,000 573,000 | 12 9 | | | | |
