= The Bachelor (Australian TV series) season 5 =

The Bachelor
- Season 5
- Starring: Matty Johnson
- Presented by: Osher Günsberg
- No. of contestants: 22
- Winner: Laura Byrne
- Runner-up: Elise Stacy
- No. of episodes: 16

Release
- Original network: Network Ten
- Original release: 26 July – 14 September 2017

Season chronology
- ← Previous; Season 4 Next → Season 6

The fifth season of The Bachelor Australia premiered on 26 July 2017. This season features Matty Johnson, a 29-year-old marketing director from Sydney, New South Wales, courting 22 women. Johnson previously appeared on the second season of The Bachelorette Australia featuring Georgia Love, where he was the runner-up.

== Contestants ==
The season began with 22 contestants.

Name	Age	Hometown	Occupation	Eliminated
Laura Byrne	31	Sydney, New South Wales	Jewellery Designer	Winner
Elise Stacy	30	Perth, Western Australia	Marketing Executive	Runner-Up
Tara Pavlovic	27	Gold Coast, Queensland	Nanny	Episode 15
Florence Moerenhout	27	Melbourne, Victoria	Brand Manager	Episode 14
Elora Murger	27	Sydney, New South Wales	Fitness Trainer	Episode 13
Cobie Frost	30	Brisbane, Queensland	Coal Plant Operator	Episode 13
Lisa Carlton	24	Melbourne, Victoria	Model	Episode 12
Simone Ormesher	25	Melbourne, Victoria	Office Administrator	Episode 11
Jennifer Hawke	28	Sydney, New South Wales	Marketing Manager	Episode 10 (quit)
Michelle Paxton	31	Adelaide, South Australia	Police Officer	Episode 9
Stephanie Boulton	23	Perth, Western Australia	Safety Administrator	Episode 8
Alix McDermott	24	Austinmer, New South Wales	Body Painter	Episode 8
Sharlene Mik	26	Melbourne, Victoria	Wedding Planner	Episode 8
Leah Costa	24	Melbourne, Victoria	Architecture Student	Episode 7
Natalie Holmberg	26	Adelaide, South Australia	Midwife	Episode 6
Sian Kelly	24	Perth, Western Australia	Retail Assistant	Episode 5
Elizabeth Duncan	31	Sydney, New South Wales	Property Executive	Episode 5
Belinda Rygier	34	Brisbane, Queensland	Love Coach	Episode 4
Akoulina Ktoiants	29	Gold Coast, Queensland	Gymnastics Coach	Episode 3
Laura-Ann Rullo	27	Melbourne, Victoria	Criminal Lawyer	Episode 2
Stacey Simpson	26	Townsville, Queensland	Gym Instructor	Episode 1
Monica Brown	26	Melbourne, Victoria	Medical Receptionist	Episode 1

== Call-out order ==
Matty's call-out order
#	Bachelorettes	Episode															
#	Bachelorettes	1	2	3 (Note: The rose ceremony took place during the group date. Therefore, the women not on the group date are listed in alphabetical order.)	4	5 (Note: After Elora received her rose, the rose ceremony was cancelled when Matty pulled Sian aside and eliminated her outside of the rose ceremony. Therefore, the remaining women are listed in alphabetical order.)	6	7 (Note: The rose ceremony was cancelled after Leah was eliminated during the cocktail party. Therefore, the remaining women are listed in alphabetical order.)	8	9	10 (Note: The rose ceremony was cancelled after Jennifer decided to quit during the cocktail party. Therefore, the remaining women are listed in alphabetical order.)	11	12	13	14	15	16
1	Alix	Michelle	Elora	Laura	Cobie	Florence	Tara	Alix	Elora	Elise	Elise	Laura	Florence	Elise	Elise	Laura	Laura
2	Tara	Lisa	Lisa	Alix	Tara	Jennifer	Elora	Cobie	Florence	Tara	Cobie	Cobie	Cobie	Tara	Tara	Elise	Elise
3	Laura	Laura	Cobie	Belinda	Florence	Laura	Elise	Elise	Tara	Cobie	Elora	Elora	Tara	Laura	Laura	Tara	
4	Cobie	Alix	Alix	Cobie	Elora	Tara	Simone	Elora	Elise	Lisa	Florence	Elise	Elise	Florence	Florence		
5	Simone	Elora	Simone	Leah	Michelle	Sharlene	Alix	Florence	Laura	Laura	Laura	Tara	Laura	Elora			
6	Elise	Cobie	Laura	Lisa	Laura	Leah	Florence	Jennifer	Michelle	Florence	Lisa	Florence	Elora	Cobie			
7	Monica	Elise	Akoulina	Stephanie	Simone	Elora	Laura	Laura	Cobie	Jennifer	Simone	Lisa	Lisa				
8	Laura-Ann	Tara	Elise	Sharlene	Lisa	Alix	Stephanie	Lisa	Simone	Simone	Tara	Simone					
9	Elizabeth	Simone	Michelle	Michelle	Alix	Cobie	Lisa	Michelle	Jennifer	Elora	Jennifer						
10	Stephanie	Laura-Ann	Sian	Elise	Natalie	Elise	Cobie	Sharlene	Lisa	Michelle							
11	Sharlene	Akoulina	Elizabeth	Elora	Sian	Lisa	Leah	Simone	Stephanie; Alix								
12	Stacey	Leah	Florence	Simone	Jennifer	Michelle	Jennifer	Stephanie	Stephanie; Alix								
13	Sian	Sian	Stephanie	Elizabeth	Leah	Natalie	Sharlene	Tara	Sharlene								
14	Jennifer	Florence	Tara	Florence	Sharlene	Simone	Michelle	Leah									
15	Natalie	Stephanie	Jennifer	Jennifer	Stephanie	Stephanie	Natalie										
16	Michelle	Natalie	Sharlene	Natalie	Elizabeth	Sian											
17	Belinda	Belinda	Belinda	Sian	Elise	Elizabeth											
18	Florence	Jennifer	Natalie	Tara	Belinda												
19	Akoulina	Sharlene	Leah	Akoulina													
20	Lisa	Elizabeth	Laura-Ann														
21	Leah	Stacey; Monica															
22	Elora	Stacey; Monica															

The contestant received the first impression rose.
The contestant received a rose during a date.
The contestant received a rose outside of a date or the rose ceremony.
The contestant was eliminated.
The contestant was eliminated during a date.
The contestant quit the competition.
The contestant was eliminated outside the rose ceremony.
The contestant won the competition.

== Episodes ==
=== Episode 1 ===
Original airdate: 26 July 2017

Event	Description
First impression rose	Michelle
Rose ceremony	Monica & Stacey were eliminated.

=== Episode 2 ===
Original airdate: 27 July 2017

Event	Description
Single date	Elora; Lisa
Group date	Cobie, Elizabeth, Sian, Laura, Florence, Tara, Simone, Natalie, Leah and Jennifer
Rose ceremony	Laura-Ann was eliminated.

=== Episode 3 ===
Original airdate: 2 August 2017

Event	Description
Single date	Laura
Group date	Cobie, Stephanie, Michelle, Akoulina, Elora, Alix, Lisa, Belinda, Elise, Sharlene, Leah and Simone Alix got the group date rose during the banquet.
Rose ceremony	Akoulina was eliminated.

=== Episode 4 ===
Original airdate: 3 August 2017

Event	Description
Single date	Cobie
Group date	Everyone
Rose ceremony	Belinda was eliminated.

=== Episode 5 ===
Original airdate: 9 August 2017

Event	Description
Single date	Florence
Two-on-one date	Elizabeth and Jennifer
Rose ceremony	Elizabeth was eliminated during the two-on-one date. Sian was eliminated outside the rose ceremony.

=== Episode 6 ===
Original airdate: 10 August 2017

Event	Description
Single date	Tara
Group date	Leah, Elise, Laura, Elora, Natalie and Simone
One-on-one time	Simone
Rose ceremony	Natalie was eliminated.

=== Episode 7 ===
Original airdate: 16 August 2017

Event	Description
Single date	Alix
Group date	Leah, Jennifer, Laura, Lisa, Tara and Elise
One-on-one time	Laura
Rose ceremony	Leah was eliminated outside the rose ceremony.

=== Episode 8 ===
Original airdate: 17 August 2017

Event	Description
Single date	Elora
Group date	Everyone
One-on-one time	Florence
Rose ceremony	Sharlene was eliminated during the cocktail party. Alix & Stephanie were eliminated during the rose ceremony.

=== Episode 9 ===
Original airdate: 23 August 2017

Event	Description
Group date	Jennifer, Simone, Elise and Cobie
One-on-one time	Elise
Single date	Tara
Rose ceremony	Michelle was eliminated.

=== Episode 10 ===
Original airdate: 24 August 2017

Event	Description
Single date	Elise
Group date	Everyone
One-on-one time	Lisa, Tara, Cobie and Elora
Rose ceremony	Jennifer quit before the rose ceremony.

=== Episode 11 ===
Original airdate: 30 August 2017

Event	Description
Single date	Laura
Group date	Everyone
One-on-one time	Elise
Rose ceremony	Simone was eliminated.

=== Episode 12 ===
Original airdate: 31 August 2017

Event	Description
Single date	Florence
Group date	Everyone
One-on-one time	Tara
Rose ceremony	Lisa was eliminated.

=== Episode 13 ===
Original airdate: 6 September 2017

Event	Description
Group date	Everyone
One-on-one time	Elise
Single date	Cobie
Rose ceremony	Cobie was eliminated during her single date. Elora was eliminated during the rose ceremony.

=== Episode 14 ===
Original airdate: 7 September 2017

Event	Description
Hometown #1	Tara – Gold Coast, Queensland
Hometown #2	Florence – Melbourne, Victoria
Hometown #3	Elise – Encounter Bay, South Australia
Hometown #4	Laura – Sydney, New South Wales
Rose ceremony	Florence was eliminated.

=== Episode 15 ===
Original airdate: 13 September 2017

Event	Description
Single Date #1	Laura
Single Date #2	Elise
Single Date #3	Tara
Rose ceremony	Tara was eliminated.

=== Episode 16 ===
Original airdate: 14 September 2017
Location: Phang Nga, Thailand

Event	Description
Meet Matty's Family #1	Elise
Meet Matty's Family #2	Laura
Final Date #1	Elise
Final Date #2	Laura
Final Decision:	Laura is the winner

== Ratings ==
No.	Title	Air date	Timeslot	Overnight ratings		Consolidated ratings		Total viewers	Ref(s)
No.	Title	Air date	Timeslot	Viewers	Rank	Viewers	Rank	Total viewers	Ref(s)
1	Episode 1	26 July 2017	Wednesday 7:30 pm	846,000	5	53,000	5	899,000	
2	Episode 2	27 July 2017	Thursday 7:30 pm	739,000	6	116,000	5	855,000	
3	Episode 3	2 August 2017	Wednesday 7:30 pm	715,000	12	47,000	11	762,000	
4	Episode 4	3 August 2017	Thursday 7:30 pm	726,000	7	73,000	6	799,000	
5	Episode 5	9 August 2017	Wednesday 7:30 pm	753,000	7	57,000	9	810,000	
6	Episode 6	10 August 2017	Thursday 7:30 pm	764,000	6	87,000	5	851,000	
7	Episode 7	16 August 2017	Wednesday 7:30 pm	736,000	8	73,000	9	809,000	
8	Episode 8	17 August 2017	Thursday 7:30 pm	787,000	5	114,000	5	901,000	
9	Episode 9	23 August 2017	Wednesday 7:30 pm	749,000	7	57,000	7	806,000	
10	Episode 10	24 August 2017	Thursday 7:30 pm	736,000	6	82,000	6	818,000	
11	Episode 11	30 August 2017	Wednesday 7:30 pm	680,000	11	44,000	10	724,000	
12	Episode 12	31 August 2017	Thursday 7:30 pm	739,000	6	96,000	4	835,000	
13	Episode 13	6 September 2017	Wednesday 7:30 pm	717,000	9	50,000	10	767,000	
14	Episode 14	7 September 2017	Thursday 7:30 pm	717,000	7	108,000	6	825,000	
15	Episode 15	13 September 2017	Wednesday 7:30 pm	816,000	7	27,000	8	843,000	
16	Finale Final Decision	14 September 2017	Thursday 7:30 pm Thursday 9:00 pm	980,000 1,116,000	3 1	38,000 48,000	2 1	1,018,000 1,164,000	
