= The Bachelorette (Australian TV series) season 4 =

The Bachelorette
- Season 4
- Starring: Ali Oetjen
- Presented by: Osher Günsberg
- No. of contestants: 18
- Winner: Taite Radley
- Runner-up: Todd King
- No. of episodes: 12

Release
- Original network: Network 10
- Original release: 10 October – 15 November 2018

Season chronology
- ← Previous; Season 3 Next → Season 5

The fourth season of The Bachelorette Australia premiered on Network 10 on 10 October 2018. The season features Ali Oetjen, a 32-year-old healthy lifestyle motivator from Adelaide, South Australia, courting 18 men. Oetjen previously appeared on the first season of The Bachelor Australia featuring Tim Robards, where she finished in third place and later appeared on the first season of Bachelor in Paradise Australia.

== Contestants ==
The season began with 18 contestants.

Name	Age	Hometown	Occupation	Eliminated
Taite Radley	28	Ballarat, Victoria	Bank Manager	Winner
Todd King	26	Perth, Western Australia	Sales Rep	Runner-up
Bill Goldsmith	31	Melbourne, Victoria	Mechanical Plumber	Episode 11
Charlie Newling	31	Sydney, New South Wales	Builder	Episode 10
Daniel Noonan	30	Melbourne, Victoria	Personal Trainer	Episode 9
Dan Hobley	32	Perth, Western Australia	Sports Reporter	Episode 8
Paddy Colliar	27	Geelong, Victoria	Gym Manager	Episode 8
Robert Colangelo	29	Melbourne, Victoria	Plumber	Episode 7
Danny Harris-Wolf	39	Brisbane, Queensland	Chiropractic Student	Episode 6
Pete Stephen	27	Gold Coast, Queensland	Commercial Sales Assistant	Episode 6
Jules Bourne	24	Sydney, New South Wales	Former Infantry Corporal	Episode 5
Ivan Krslovic	29	Melbourne, Victoria	Commercial Painter	Episode 5
Nathan Favro	23	Sydney, New South Wales	Carpenter	Episode 4
Damien Rider	42	Gold Coast, Queensland	Retreat Director	Episode 3
Wesley Ford	31	Yeppoon, Queensland	Heavy Machinery Operator	Episode 3
Cheyne Neigh	28	Sydney, New South Wales	Construction Auditor	Episode 2
Ben Adamson	27	Katherine, Northern Territory	Air Conditioning Mechanic	Episode 1
Brendan Cavanagh	29	Sydney, New South Wales	Events Manager	Episode 1

== Call-Out Order ==
Ali's call-out order
#	Bachelors	Episode											
#	Bachelors	1	2	3	4 (Note: The rose ceremony was cancelled after Nathan was eliminated during the cocktail party. Therefore, the remaining men are listed in alphabetical order.)	5	6	7	8	9	10 (Note: The rose ceremony was cancelled after Charlie was eliminated during the cocktail party. Therefore, the remaining men are listed in alphabetical order.)	11	12
1	Charlie	Bill	Charlie	Robert	Bill	Bill	Taite	Daniel	Charlie	Todd	Bill	Todd	Taite
2	Robert	Ivan	Robert	Dan	Charlie	Charlie	Daniel	Todd	Bill	Charlie	Taite	Taite	Todd
3	Ivan	Todd	Taite	Todd	Dan	Taite	Dan	Bill	Taite	Bill	Todd	Bill	
4	Nathan	Danny	Danny	Taite	Danny	Paddy	Charlie	Paddy	Daniel	Taite	Charlie		
5	Bill	Wesley	Bill	Ivan	Daniel	Dan	Todd	Taite	Todd	Daniel			
6	Jules	Charlie	Wesley	Danny	Ivan	Daniel	Bill	Dan	Dan; Paddy				
7	Daniel	Robert	Nathan	Paddy	Jules	Robert	Paddy	Charlie	Dan; Paddy				
8	Wesley	Daniel	Pete	Daniel	Paddy	Danny	Robert	Robert					
9	Brendan	Dan	Paddy	Bill	Pete	Pete	Pete						
10	Danny	Jules	Ivan	Jules	Robert	Todd	Danny						
11	Cheyne	Taite	Damien	Charlie	Taite	Jules							
12	Ben	Damien	Dan	Nathan	Todd	Ivan							
13	Taite	Pete	Daniel	Pete	Nathan								
14	Damien	Cheyne	Todd	Damien; Wesley									
15	Paddy	Paddy	Jules	Damien; Wesley									
16	Dan	Nathan	Cheyne										
17	Pete	Ben; Brendan											
18	Todd	Ben; Brendan											

Color Key

The contestant received the first impression "wild rose", having the ability to steal a single date from another contestant.
The contestant received a rose during a date.
The contestant was eliminated outside the rose ceremony.
The contestant was eliminated during a date.
The contestant was eliminated.
The contestant quit the competition.
The contestant won the competition.

== Episodes ==
=== Episode 1 ===
Original airdate: 10 October 2018

Event	Description
Wild Rose	Bill
Rose ceremony	Ben & Brendan were eliminated.

=== Episode 2 ===
Original airdate: 11 October 2018

Event	Description
Single date	Charlie
Group date	Taite, Daniel, Todd, Damien, Dan, Robert, Danny, Jules, Ivan & Paddy
Rose ceremony	Cheyne was eliminated

=== Episode 3 ===
Original airdate: 17 October 2018

Event	Description
Single date	Robert
Group date	Everyone
One-on-one time	Ivan
Rose ceremony	Damien & Wesley were eliminated

=== Episode 4 ===
Original airdate: 18 October 2018

Event	Description
Single date	(Taite's Single Date); Bill used his wild rose
Group date	Bill, Charlie, Danny, Ivan, Jules, Paddy, Robert, Nathan
One-on-one time	Danny
Rose ceremony	Nathan was eliminated outside of the rose ceremony

=== Episode 5 ===
Original airdate 24 October 2018

Event	Description
Two-on-one date	Ivan & Bill; Ivan was eliminated
Group date	Dan, Todd, Charlie; Robert, Pete, Taite
One-on-one time	Charlie
Rose ceremony	Jules was eliminated

=== Episode 6 ===
Original airdate 25 October 2018

Event	Description
Single date	Taite
Group date	Everyone
Rose ceremony	Danny & Pete were eliminated

=== Episode 7 ===
Original airdate 31 October 2018

Event	Description
Group date	Everyone
One-on-one time	Daniel
Single date	Todd
Rose ceremony	Robert was eliminated

=== Episode 8 ===
Original airdate 1 November 2018

Event	Description
Single date	Charlie
Group date	Everyone
One-on-one time	Bill, Dan, Daniel, Taite, Todd
Rose ceremony	Dan & Paddy were eliminated

=== Episode 9 ===
Original airdate 7 November 2018

Event	Description
Group date	Everyone
One-on-one time	Bill
Single date	Taite
Rose ceremony	Daniel was eliminated

=== Episode 10 ===
Original airdate 8 November 2018

Event	Description
Hometown #1	Todd - Perth, Western Australia
Hometown #2	Taite - Ballarat, Victoria
Hometown #3	Bill - Melbourne, Victoria
Hometown #4	Charlie - Sydney, New South Wales
Rose ceremony	Charlie was eliminated outside the rose ceremony.

=== Episode 11 ===
Original airdate 14 November 2018

Event	Description
Single Date #1	Todd
Single Date #2	Taite
Single Date #3	Bill
Rose ceremony	Bill was eliminated

=== Episode 12 ===
Original airdate 15 November 2018

Event	Description
Meet Ali's Family #1	Taite
Meet Ali's Family #2	Todd
Final date #1	Todd
Final date #2	Taite
Final Decision:	Taite is the winner.

== Ratings ==
No.	Title	Air date	Timeslot	Overnight ratings		Consolidated ratings		Total viewers	Ref(s)
No.	Title	Air date	Timeslot	Viewers	Rank	Viewers	Rank	Total viewers	Ref(s)
1	Episode 1	10 October 2018	Wednesday 7:30 pm	631,000	11	54,000	10	685,000	
2	Episode 2	11 October 2018	Thursday 7:30 pm	539,000	11	81,000	9	621,000	
3	Episode 3	17 October 2018	Wednesday 7:30 pm	544,000	15	54,000	15	598,000	
4	Episode 4	18 October 2018	Thursday 7:30 pm	586,000	10	69,000	9	655,000	
5	Episode 5	24 October 2018	Wednesday 7:30 pm	622,000	9	51,000	8	673,000	
6	Episode 6	25 October 2018	Thursday 7:30 pm	589,000	8	64,000	8	653,000	
7	Episode 7	31 October 2018	Wednesday 7:30 pm	537,000	12	58,000	13	595,000	
8	Episode 8	1 November 2018	Thursday 7:30 pm	512,000	11	77,000	9	589,000	
9	Episode 9	7 November 2018	Wednesday 7:30 pm	601,000	11	51,000	11	652,000	
10	Episode 10	8 November 2018	Thursday 7:30 pm	605,000	8	85,000	5	690,000	
11	Episode 11	14 November 2018	Wednesday 7:30 pm	618,000	10	35,000	9	653,000	
12	Finale Final Decision	15 November 2018	Thursday 7:30 pm Thursday 9:00 pm	766,000 926,000	4 1	50,000 53,000	4 1	816,000 979,000	
