= Matty Johnson =

Australian media personality

- Born: Matthew David Johnson; 6 July 1987 (age 39); Brisbane, Queensland, Australia
- Other name: Matty J
- Occupations: Media personality, podcaster, presenter
- Years active: 2016–present
- Spouse: Laura Byrne (m. 2022)
- Children: 3

Matthew David Johnson (born 6 July 1987) is an Australian media personality, podcaster and presenter.

== Career ==
In 2016, Johnson first appeared on the second season of The Bachelorette Australia, where he ended as the runner-up.

In 2017, Johnson then appeared on the fifth season of The Bachelor Australia, where he chose Laura Byrne as the winner.

In 2019, Johnson co-hosted Luxury Escapes.

In 2021, Johnson competed in the eighteenth season of Dancing with the Stars Australia, where he was partnered with Ruby Gherbaz. He was eliminated sixth from the contest.

In 2025, Johnson appeared as a contestant on the eleventh season of I'm a Celebrity...Get Me Out of Here!, where he finished third.

== Personal life ==
Johnson married Laura Byrne in Mollymook, New South Wales on 11 November 2022. They have three daughters.
