= Michael Turnbull (soccer) =

Australian soccer player

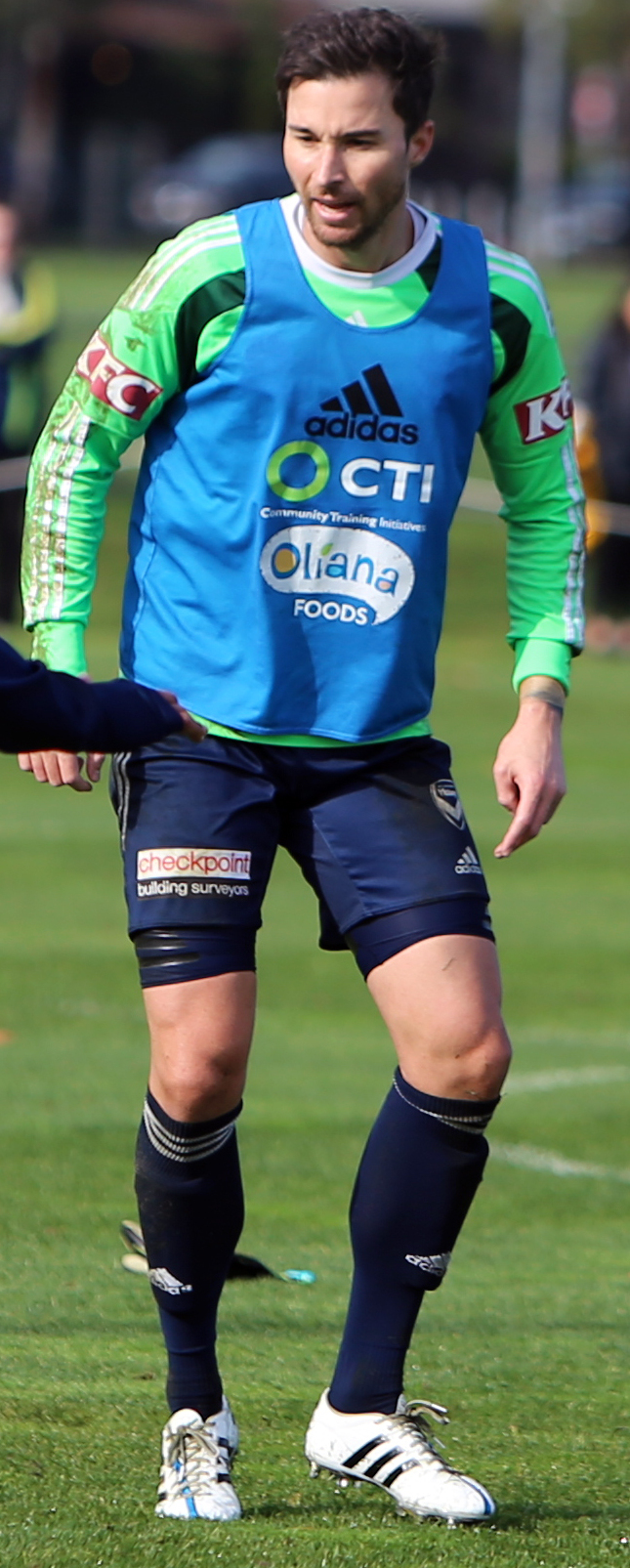
- Michael Turnbull training for Melbourne Victory in 2015

Personal information
- Full name: Michael David Turnbull
- Date of birth: 24 March 1981 (age 45)
- Place of birth: Brisbane, Queensland
- Height: 1.92 m (6 ft 3 1/2 in)
- Position: Goalkeeper

Youth career
- 1988–1994: Loganholme
- 1994–1997: Rochedale
- 1997–1999: A.I.S.

Senior career*
Years	Team	Apps	(Gls)
1999–2004	Marconi Stallions	106	(0)
2004–2005	Standard Liège	0	(0)
2006	Kingston City	11	(0)
2006–2007	New Zealand Knights	6	(0)
2007	Oakleigh Cannons	19	(0)
2008	Sydney United	0	(0)
2008	Wollongong FC	5	(0)
2009	Sydney Olympic	3	(0)
2014–2015	Brisbane Strikers	11	(0)
2015	Melbourne Victory	0	(0)
Total		161	(0)

International career
1999–2001	Australia U20	10	(0)
2004	Australia U23	1	(0)
Medal record
Representing Australia
Men's Association football
OFC U-19 Men's Championship
Winner	2001 Cook Islands/New Caledonia
- * Club domestic league appearances and goals

Michael David Turnbull (born 24 March 1981) is an Australian former professional footballer, businessman, and television personality who played as goalkeeper and reality television contestant. Turnbull was a member of the Australian squad at the 2000 Summer Olympics in Sydney, and played in two FIFA World Youth Championships. Turnball also featured as one of the bachelors on Network Ten's The Bachelorette Australia in 2015.

== Club career ==
Turnbull played with Marconi Stallions in the National Soccer League between 1997 and 2004.

In 2000, he briefly trained with AS Roma, however was never signed by the Italian club.

After leaving Marconi, Turnbull signed with Belgian team Standard Liège, however he was unable to break into the first team.

After leaving Belgium he signed with Bristol City for three years in England but had to return to Australia due to work visa issues.

In March 2006 Turnbull was signed by A-League team New Zealand Knights. He left at the end of the 2006–07 season after playing six matches for the Auckland team.

He later played for the Brisbane Strikers in NPL Queensland and in the FFA Cup.

On 24 April 2015, Melbourne Victory announced that they had signed Michael Turnbull leading into the A-League finals series. His stint ended without playing a game after the Victory went on to win the league's Premiership and Championship.

== International career ==
Turnbull played three matches for Australia U20 at the 1999 and 2001 FIFA World Youth Championships. At the 1999 tournament he played one match, a 4–0 loss against Ireland. At the 2001 tournament he played two games, a 2–0 win over Japan and a 3–0 loss to Czech Republic.

Turnbull was a member of the Australian team at the 2000 Summer Olympics where he was an unused substitute in Australia's three games.

== After football ==
Turnbull featured as one of the bachelors on Network Ten's The Bachelorette Australia in 2015. He made it to the final two to compete for the love of Sam Frost. He lost to Sasha Mielczarek in the finale.

Turnbull has built up a successful real estate business.

Turnbull featured as one of the bachelors on Network Ten's Bachelor in Paradise Australia in 2018.

== Career statistics ==
Appearances and goals by club, season and competition
Club	Season	League			Cup		Continental		Total	
Club	Season	Division	Apps	Goals	Apps	Goals	Apps	Goals	Apps	Goals
Marconi Stallions	1999–2000	National Soccer League	29	0	0	0	0	0	29	0
Marconi Stallions	2000–01	National Soccer League	6	0	0	0	0	0	6	0
Marconi Stallions	2001–02	National Soccer League	23	0	0	0	0	0	23	0
Marconi Stallions	2002–03	National Soccer League	23	0	0	0	0	0	23	0
Marconi Stallions	2003–04	National Soccer League	25	0	0	0	0	0	25	0
Marconi Stallions	Marconi total		106	0	0	0	0	0	106	0
Standard Liège	2004–05	Belgian First Division	0	0	0	0	0	0	0	0
Kingston City	2006	Victorian Premier League	11	0	0	0	0	0	11	0
New Zealand Knights	2006–07	A-League	6	0	2	0	0	0	8	0
Oakleigh Cannons	2007	Victorian Premier League	19	0	0	0	0	0	19	0
Sydney United	2008	NSW Premier League	0	0	0	0	0	0	0	0
Wollongong FC	2008	NSW Premier League	5	0	0	0	0	0	5	0
Sydney Olympic	2009	NSW Premier League	3	0	0	0	0	0	3	0
Brisbane Strikers	2014	National Premier Leagues	5	0	3	0	0	0	8	0
Brisbane Strikers	2015	National Premier Leagues	6	0	0	0	0	0	6	0
Brisbane Strikers	Strikers total		11	0	3	0	0	0	14	0
Melbourne Victory	2014–15	A-League	0	0	0	0	0	0	0	0
Career total			161	0	5	0	0	0	166	0

== Honours ==
Wollongong FC

- NSW Premier League Championship: 2008

Brisbane Strikers

- Canale Cup: 2014

'Melbourne Victory

- A-League Championship: 2014–15
- A-League Premiership: 2014–15

Australia U-20

- OFC U-19 Men's Championship: 2001

== See also ==
- List of New Zealand Knights FC players
