= Luxury Escapes =

Australian travel and lifestyle television program

- Genre: Travel
- Presented by: Matty Johnson, Sophie Falkiner, Cameron Daddo
- Country of origin: Australia
- No. of seasons: 6

Production
- Running time: 30 minutes (including commercials)

Original release
- Network: Network Ten
- Release: 12 November 2016

Luxury Escapes is an Australian travel and lifestyle television program created by a travel company of the same name. It was created through a partnership between Luxury Escapes magazine and the Seven Network. Luxury Escapes, also known as Luxury Escapes: The World's Best Holidays has been hosted by Matty Johnson, Sophie Falkiner and Cameron Daddo. The program was originally broadcast across Network Ten, 10 Peach, and 10 Play. As of 2023, it was produced by Foxtel, and is also on Binge.

The first season of six episodes was hosted by former AFL footballer Shane Jolley and premiered on 12 November 2016 on the Seven Network. Sophie Falkiner joined as the series as co-host for a second season which began 29 July 2017. The series moved to Network Ten for its third season which screened from 14 July 2018. The fourth season premiered on 13 July 2019 with Matty Johnson joining as co-host.

The series features both Australian and international locations, promoting tourist destinations around the world, and offering viewers access to special deals following each segment.

== See also ==
- Getaway
- Postcards
- Helloworld Travel
- List of Australian Television Series
