= The Bachelor (Australian TV series) season 4 =

The Bachelor
- Season 4
- Starring: Richie Strahan
- Presented by: Osher Günsberg
- No. of contestants: 25
- Winner: Alex Nation
- Runner-up: Niki Gogan
- No. of episodes: 16

Release
- Original network: Network Ten
- Original release: 27 July – 15 September 2016

Season chronology
- ← Previous; Season 3 Next → Season 5

The fourth season of The Bachelor premiered on 27 July 2016. This season features Richie Strahan, a 31-year-old Rope Access Technician from Perth, Western Australia, courting 25 women. Strahan previously appeared on the first season of The Bachelorette Australia featuring Sam Frost, where he finished in third place.

== Contestants ==
The season began with 22 contestants. In episode 7, three "intruders" were brought into the competition, bringing the total number of contestants to 25.

Name	Age	Hometown	Occupation	Eliminated
Alexandra "Alex" Nation	24	Mornington Peninsula, Victoria	Venue Manager	Winner
Nikki Gogan	28	Northam, Western Australia	Real Estate Agent	Runner-Up
Olena Khamula	23	Sydney, New South Wales	Makeup Artist	Episode 15
Rachael Gouvignon	31	Perth, Western Australia	Support Worker	Episode 14
Faith Williams (Note: Despite sharing a surname, Faith and Laura are not related.)	26	Brisbane, Queensland	Hairdresser	Episode 13
Stephanie "Steph" Dixon	25	Ballarat, Victoria	Model	Episode 12
Kirralee "Kiki" Morris	28	Sydney, New South Wales	Personal Assistant	Episode 11
Sarah Harding	26	Brisbane, Queensland	Sales Representative	Episode 10
Noni Janur	25	Gold Coast, Queensland	Swimwear Designer	Episode 9
Keira Maguire	29	Sydney, New South Wales	Account Manager	Episode 8
Georgia Tripos	24	Melbourne, Victoria	Artist	Episode 7
Megan Marx	27	Geraldton, Western Australia	Health Promotions Officer	Episode 7 (quit)
Sasha Zhuravlyova	31	Melbourne, Victoria	Executive Assistant	Episode 6
Eliza St John	31	Sydney, New South Wales	Event Coordinator	Episode 5
Marja Jacobsen	34	Sydney, New South Wales	Yoga Instructor	Episode 4
Sophie Edwards	28	Adelaide, South Australia	Customer Support Manager	Episode 4
Janey Birks	27	Brisbane, Queensland	Children's Entertainer	Episode 3
Tiffany Scanlon	29	Perth, Western Australia	Training Administrator	Episode 3
Tolyna Baan	32	Melbourne, Victoria	Personal Trainer	Episode 3
Laura Williams	25	Melbourne, Victoria	Project Manager	Episode 2
Mia MacKinnon	24	Sydney, New South Wales	Former Athlete/Student	Episode 2
Aimee Psellos	31	Melbourne, Victoria	Business Development Manager	Episode 1
Natalie Nazzari	27	Kalgoorlie, Western Australia	Communications Officer	Episode 1
Vintaea Carlos	25	Brisbane, Queensland	Massage Therapist	Episode 1 (quit)

== Call-out order ==
Richie's call-out order
#	Bachelorettes	Episode															
#	Bachelorettes	1	2	3	4	5	6	7	8 (Note: The rose ceremony was cancelled due to Keira's elimination during her single date. Therefore, the remaining contestants are listed in alphabetical order.)	9	10	11	12	13	14	15	16
1	Nikki	Tiffany	Nikki	Megan	Faith	Alex	Faith	Rachael	Olena	Steph	Alex	Nikki	Faith	Rachael	Nikki	Nikki	Alex
2	Megan	Megan	Olena	Noni	Keira	Nikki	Kiki	Alex	Alex	Faith	Steph	Olena	Alex	Nikki	Olena	Alex	Nikki
3	Janey	Alex	Rachael	Kiki	Rachael	Sasha	Nikki	Steph	Faith	Alex	Nikki	Rachael	Nikki	Alex	Alex	Olena	
4	Natalie	Faith	Georgia	Nikki	Nikki	Kiki	Keira	Nikki	Khalia	Rachael	Kiki	Steph	Olena	Olena	Rachael		
5	Georgia	Nikki	Noni	Olena	Olena	Faith	Olena	Noni	Kiki	Olena	Faith	Alex	Rachael	Faith			
6	Tiffany	Rachael	Keira	Keira	Georgia	Rachael	Georgia	Faith	Nikki	Nikki	Olena	Faith	Steph				
7	Eliza	Olena	Alex	Marja	Sasha	Georgia	Alex	Olena	Noni	Kiki	Rachael	Kiki					
8	Alex	Janey	Faith	Alex	Megan	Olena	Noni	Keira	Rachael	Sarah	Sarah						
9	Kiki	Mia	Kiki	Faith	Eliza	Megan	Megan	Kiki	Sarah	Khalia; Noni							
10	Aimee	Kiki	Sasha	Rachael	Noni	Keira	Rachael	Sarah	Steph	Khalia; Noni							
11	Rachael	Noni	Megan	Sophie	Alex	Noni	Sasha	Khalia	Keira								
12	Marja	Laura	Janey	Georgia	Kiki	Eliza		Georgia									
13	Sophie	Sophie	Tiffany	Sasha	Marja; Sophie			Megan									
14	Laura	Sasha	Eliza	Eliza	Marja; Sophie												
15	Tolyna	Eliza	Tolyna	Janey; Tiffany; Tolyna													
16	Mia	Marja	Marja	Janey; Tiffany; Tolyna													
17	Keira	Tolyna	Sophie	Janey; Tiffany; Tolyna													
18	Sasha	Georgia	Laura; Mia														
19	Faith	Keira	Laura; Mia														
20	Noni	Aimee; Natalie															
21	Vintaea	Aimee; Natalie															
22	Olena	Vintaea															
23	Steph (Note: This contestant was an intruder and did not join the competition until Episode 7.)																
24	Sarah																
25	Khalia																

The contestant received the white rose, giving her the ability to spend extra time in a secret room with the Bachelor whenever she wishes.
The contestant received a first impression rose.
The contestant received a rose during a date.
The contestant was eliminated.
The contestant was eliminated during a date.
The contestant quit the competition.
The contestant was eliminated outside the rose ceremony.
The contestant won the competition.

== Episodes ==
=== Episode 1 ===
Original airdate: 27 July 2016

Event	Description
First impression rose	Tiffany; Megan
White rose	Alex
Rose ceremony	Vintaea quit during the rose ceremony; Aimee & Natalie were eliminated.

=== Episode 2 ===
Original airdate: 28 July 2016

Event	Description
Single date	Nikki; Olena
Group date	Alex, Faith, Kiki, Tolyna, Keira, Sasha, Eliza, Laura, Georgia, and Mia
Rose ceremony	Laura & Mia were eliminated.

=== Episode 3 ===
Original airdate: 3 August 2016

Event	Description
Single date	Megan
Group date	Rachael, Alex, Nikki, Sasha, Marja, Janey, Kiki, Keira, Tolyna, Noni, Tiffany, and Sophie
One-on-one time	Rachael, Sasha, Janey, Tolyna, Noni and Tiffany
Rose ceremony	Janey, Tiffany & Tolyna were eliminated.

=== Episode 4 ===
Original airdate: 4 August 2016

Event	Description
Single date	Faith
Group date	Eliza, Georgia, Noni, Sophie, Rachael, Olena and Keira
One-on-one time	Keira
Rose ceremony	Marja & Sophie were eliminated.

=== Episode 5 ===
Original airdate: 10 August 2016

Event	Description
Single date	Alex
Group date	Sasha, Kiki, Megan and Nikki (and Noni)
One-on-one time	Nikki
Rose ceremony	Eliza was eliminated.

=== Episode 6 ===
Original airdate: 11 August 2016

Event	Description
Group date	Olena, Faith, Megan, Georgia, Nikki, Sasha, Noni, Alex, Rachael and Keira
One-on-one time	Faith
Single date	Kiki
Rose ceremony	Sasha was eliminated.

=== Episode 7 ===
Original airdate: 17 August 2016

Event	Description
Single date	Rachael
Intruders	Steph, Sarah & Khalia were introduced.
Group date	Khalia, Sarah & Steph
Rose ceremony	Megan quit during the rose ceremony; Georgia was eliminated.

=== Episode 8 ===
Original airdate: 18 August 2016

Event	Description
Single date	Olena; Keira
Group date	Alex, Steph, Rachael, Kiki, Sarah, Faith, Nikki and Noni
One-on-one time	Rachael & Noni
Rose ceremony	Keira was eliminated during her single date; the rose ceremony was cancelled.

=== Episode 9 ===
Original airdate: 24 August 2016

Event	Description
Single date	Steph
Group date	Everyone
Rose ceremony	Khalia & Noni were eliminated.

=== Episode 10 ===
Original airdate: 25 August 2016

Event	Description
Single date	Alex
Group date	Everyone
Rose ceremony	Sarah was eliminated.

=== Episode 11 ===
Original airdate: 31 August 2016

Event	Description
Single date	Nikki
Group date	Everyone
Rose ceremony	Kiki was eliminated.

=== Episode 12 ===
Original airdate: 1 September 2016

Event	Description
Single date	Faith; Rachael
Group date	N/A
Rose ceremony	Steph was eliminated.

=== Episode 13 ===
Original airdate: 7 September 2016

Event	Description
Single date	N/A
Group date	Everyone
Rose ceremony	Faith was eliminated.

=== Episode 14 ===
Original airdate: 8 September 2016

Event	Description
Hometown #1	Alex - Mornington Peninsula, Victoria
Hometown #2	Olena - Sydney, New South Wales
Hometown #3	Rachael - Perth, Western Australia
Hometown #4	Nikki - Northam, Western Australia
Rose ceremony	Rachael was eliminated.

=== Episode 15 ===
Original airdate: 14 September 2016; filmed at Ubud, Bali, Indonesia

Event	Description
Overnight #1	Alex
Overnight #2	Nikki
Overnight #3	Olena
Rose ceremony	Olena was eliminated.

=== Episode 16 ===
Original airdate: 15 September 2016
Location: Ubud, Bali, Indonesia

Event	Description
Meet Richie's Family #1	Alex
Meet Richie's Family #2	Nikki
Final Date #1	Nikki
Final Date #2	Alex
Final Decision:	Alex is the winner

== Ratings ==
No.	Title	Air date	Timeslot	Overnight ratings		Consolidated ratings		Total viewers	Ref(s)
No.	Title	Air date	Timeslot	Viewers	Rank	Viewers	Rank	Total viewers	Ref(s)
1	Episode 1	27 July 2016	Wednesday 7:30 pm	882,000	5	52,000	5	934,000	
2	Episode 2	28 July 2016	Thursday 7:30 pm	824,000	5	129,000	4	953,000	
3	Episode 3	3 August 2016	Wednesday 7:30 pm	819,000	8	60,000	7	879,000	
4	Episode 4	4 August 2016	Thursday 7:30 pm	771,000	5	80,000	5	851,000	
5	Episode 5	10 August 2016	Wednesday 7:30 pm	858,000	8	62,000	7	920,000	
6	Episode 6	11 August 2016	Thursday 7:30 pm	742,000	9	110,000	7	852,000	
7	Episode 7	17 August 2016	Wednesday 7:30 pm	838,000	7	37,000	7	875,000	
8	Episode 8	18 August 2016	Thursday 7:30 pm	777,000	8	94,000	6	871,000	
9	Episode 9	24 August 2016	Wednesday 7:30 pm	853,000	6	44,000	7	897,000	
10	Episode 10	25 August 2016	Thursday 7:30 pm	750,000	8	74,000	5	824,000	
11	Episode 11	31 August 2016	Wednesday 7:30 pm	821,000	8	44,000	8	865,000	
12	Episode 12	1 September 2016	Thursday 7:30 pm	857,000	5	73,000	4	930,000	
13	Episode 13	7 September 2016	Wednesday 7:30 pm	844,000	7	66,000	7	910,000	
14	Episode 14	8 September 2016	Thursday 7:30 pm	818,000	5	101,000	2	919,000	
15	Episode 15	14 September 2016	Wednesday 7:30 pm	909,000	5	43,000	4	952,000	
16	Finale Final Decision	15 September 2016	Thursday 7:30 pm Thursday 9:00 pm	1,103,000 1,324,000	3 1	32,000 53,000	2 1	1,134,000 1,377,000	
