= The Bachelorette (Australian TV series) season 3 =

The Bachelorette
- Season 3
- Starring: Sophie Monk
- Presented by: Osher Günsberg
- No. of contestants: 22
- Winner: Stu Laundy
- Runner-up: Jarrod Woodgate
- No. of episodes: 12

Release
- Original network: Network Ten
- Original release: 20 September – 26 October 2017

Season chronology
- ← Previous; Season 2 Next → Season 4

The third season of The Bachelorette Australia premiered on Network Ten on 20 September 2017. The season features Sophie Monk, a 37-year-old model and radio personality from Gold Coast, Queensland, courting 22 men.

== Contestants ==
The season began with 18 contestants. In episode 5, four "intruders" were brought into the competition, bringing the total number of contestants to 22.

| Name | Age | Hometown | Occupation | Eliminated |
|---|---|---|---|---|
| Stu Laundy (Note: Stu was an intruder in episode 5.) | 44 | Sydney, New South Wales | Publican | Winner |
| Jarrod Woodgate | 32 | Gippsland, Victoria | Vineyard Manager | Runner-up |
| Apollo Jackson | 24 | Gold Coast, Queensland | Magician | Episode 11 |
| Blake Colman | 29 | Perth, Western Australia | Investor/Entrepreneur | Episode 10 |
| James Trethewie | 31 | Sydney, New South Wales | Financial Adviser | Episode 9 |
| Sam Cochrane | 34 | Sydney, New South Wales | Voice Over Artist | Episode 8 |
| A.J. Illidge (Note: A.J. was an intruder in episode 5.) | 37 | Sydney, New South Wales | Chef | Episode 8 |
| Luke McLeod | 33 | Sydney, New South Wales | Business Culture Consultant | Episode 7 |
| Mack Reid | 35 | Perth, Western Australia | Small Business Owner | Episode 7 |
| Ryan Jones | 26 | Sydney, New South Wales | Construction Foreman | Episode 6 |
| Guy Anderson (Note: Guy was an intruder in episode 5.) | 37 | Sydney, New South Wales | Optometrist | Episode 6 |
| Brett Moore | 27 | Perth, Western Australia | Personal Trainer | Episode 5 |
| Harry Farran | 24 | Adelaide, South Australia | Restaurant Manager | Episode 5 |
| Hayden Felsenthal | 29 | Melbourne, Victoria | Marketing Manager | Episode 5 |
| Paul Schimpf (Note: Paul was an intruder in episode 5.) | 39 | Perth, Western Australia | Law Student | Episode 5 |
| Bingham Fitz-Henry | 25 | Brisbane, Queensland | Polo Player | Episode 4 |
| Eden Schwencke | 33 | Perth, Western Australia | Scaffolder | Episode 3 |
| Jefferson De La Rosa | 30 | Sydney, New South Wales | Events Manager | Episode 3 |
| Pete De Gail | 32 | Sydney, New South Wales | Fashion Designer | Episode 3 |
| Jourdan Siyal | 25 | Brisbane, Queensland | Bar Manager | Episode 2 |
| Chad Monkhouse | 37 | Melbourne, Victoria | Contact Services Manager | Episode 1 |
| Jamie | 38 | Perth, Western Australia | Engineer | Episode 1 |

== Call-out order ==
Sophie's call-out order
| # | Bachelors | Episode | | | | | | | | | | | |
| # | Bachelors | 1 | 2 | 3 | 4 | 5 | 6 | 7 | 8 | 9 | 10 | 11 | 12 |
|---|---|---|---|---|---|---|---|---|---|---|---|---|---|
| 1 | Apollo | Sam | Jarrod | Luke | James | Apollo | James | Stu | Apollo | Blake | Jarrod | Jarrod | Stu |
| 2 | Jarrod | Apollo | James | Mack | Sam | Luke | Mack | James | Jarrod | Stu | Apollo | Stu | Jarrod |
| 3 | Eden | Luke | Brett | Sam | Jarrod | Stu | Stu | Jarrod | Stu | Jarrod | Stu | Apollo | |
| 4 | James | Jarrod | Eden | Hayden | Apollo | Guy | Blake | Apollo | James | Apollo | Blake | | |
| 5 | Sam | James | Luke | Jarrod | Mack | Blake | Jarrod | Blake | Blake | James | | | |
| 6 | Jourdan | Harry | Ryan | James | Blake | Ryan | Sam | AJ | AJ; Sam | | | | |
| 7 | Luke | Bingham | Blake | Ryan | Luke | Mack | Luke | Sam | AJ; Sam | | | | |
| 8 | Chad | Blake | Apollo | Bingham | Hayden | James | Apollo | Luke; Mack | | | | | |
| 9 | Brett | Eden | Pete | Apollo | Harry | Sam | AJ | Luke; Mack | | | | | |
| 10 | Harry | Mackane | Harry | Harry | Brett | Jarrod | Guy | | | | | | |
| 11 | Jefferson | Jourdan | Mack | Blake | Ryan | AJ | Ryan | | | | | | |
| 12 | Jamie | Jefferson | Sam | Brett | Bingham | Brett; Harry; Hayden; Paul | | | | | | | |
| 13 | Pete | Brett | Hayden | Eden; Jefferson; Pete | | Brett; Harry; Hayden; Paul | | | | | | | |
| 14 | Hayden | Pete | Jefferson | Eden; Jefferson; Pete | | Brett; Harry; Hayden; Paul | | | | | | | |
| 15 | Bingham | Ryan | Bingham | Eden; Jefferson; Pete | | Brett; Harry; Hayden; Paul | | | | | | | |
| 16 | Mack | Hayden | Jourdan | | | | | | | | | | |
| 17 | Blake | Chad; Jamie | | | | | | | | | | | |
| 18 | Ryan | Chad; Jamie | | | | | | | | | | | |
| 19 | Guy | | | | | | | | | | | | |
| 20 | AJ | | | | | | | | | | | | |
| 21 | Paul | | | | | | | | | | | | |
| 22 | Stu | | | | | | | | | | | | |

Color Key

The contestant received the Double Delight rose, granting them two single dates.
The contestant received a rose during a date.
The contestant was eliminated outside the rose ceremony.
The contestant was eliminated during a date.
The contestant was eliminated.
The contestant quit the competition.
The contestant won the competition.

== Episodes ==
=== Episode 1 ===
Original airdate: 20 September 2017

| Event | Description |
|---|---|
| Double Delight rose | Sam |
| Rose ceremony | Chad & Jamie were eliminated. |

=== Episode 2 ===
Original airdate: 21 September 2017

| Event | Description |
|---|---|
| Single date | Jarrod |
| Group date | Harry, Bingham, Jourdan, Brett, Apollo, James, Sam, Ryan, Hayden, Blake |
| Rose ceremony | Jourdan was eliminated. |

=== Episode 3 ===
Original airdate: 27 September 2017

| Event | Description |
|---|---|
| Single date | Luke |
| Group date | Ryan, Jefferson, Sam, Pete, Brett, Eden, Jarrod, Mack |
| One-on-one time | Ryan |
| Rose ceremony | Eden, Jefferson and Pete were eliminated. |

=== Episode 4 ===
Original airdate: 28 September 2017

| Event | Description |
|---|---|
| Group date | Everyone |
| One-on-one time | James |
| Single date | Sam |
| Rose ceremony | Bingham was eliminated. |

=== Episode 5 ===
Original airdate: 4 October 2017

| Event | Description |
|---|---|
| Single date | Apollo |
| Intruders | Guy, AJ, Paul and Stu were introduced. |
| Group date | Everyone |
| Rose ceremony | Brett, Harry, Hayden and Paul were eliminated. |

=== Episode 6 ===
Original airdate: 5 October 2017

| Event | Description |
|---|---|
| Single date | James |
| Group date | Mack, Sam, Ryan, AJ, Blake, Stu, Guy, Jarrod |
| One-on-one time | Ryan |
| Rose ceremony | Ryan was eliminated during his one-on-one time. Guy was eliminated. |

=== Episode 7 ===
Original airdate: 11 October 2017

| Event | Description |
|---|---|
| Single date | Stu |
| Group date | Everyone |
| One-on-one time | Mack |
| Rose ceremony | Luke & Mack were eliminated. |

=== Episode 8 ===
Original airdate: 12 October 2017

| Event | Description |
|---|---|
| Single date | Apollo; Sam |
| Group date | AJ, Blake, James, Jarrod, Sam, Stu |
| One-on-one time | Blake |
| Rose ceremony | AJ & Sam were eliminated. |

=== Episode 9 ===
Original airdate: 18 October 2017

| Event | Description |
|---|---|
| Group date | Everyone |
| One-on-one time | Stu |
| Single date | Blake |
| Rose ceremony | James was eliminated. |

=== Episode 10 ===
Original airdate: 19 October 2017

| Event | Description |
|---|---|
| Hometown #1 | Jarrod – Gippsland, Victoria |
| Hometown #2 | Apollo – Gold Coast, Queensland |
| Hometown #3 | Stu – Sydney, New South Wales |
| Hometown #4 | Blake – Perth, Western Australia |
| Rose ceremony | Blake was eliminated. |

=== Episode 11 ===
Original airdate: 25 October 2017

| Event | Description |
|---|---|
| Single date #1 | Jarrod |
| Single date #2 | Stu |
| Single date #3 | Apollo |
| Rose ceremony | Apollo was eliminated |

=== Episode 12 ===
Original airdate: 26 October 2017

| Event | Description |
|---|---|
| Meet Sophie's Family #1 | Jarrod |
| Meet Sophie's Family #2 | Stu |
| Final date #1 | Jarrod |
| Final date #2 | Stu |
| Final decision: | Stu is the winner. |

== Ratings ==
| No. | Title | Air date | Timeslot | Overnight ratings | | Consolidated ratings | | Total viewers | Ref(s) |
| No. | Title | Air date | Timeslot | Viewers | Rank | Viewers | Rank | Total viewers | Ref(s) |
|---|---|---|---|---|---|---|---|---|---|
| 1 | Episode 1 | 20 September 2017 | Wednesday 7:30 pm | 951,000 | 2 | 66,000 | 2 | 1,007,000 | |
| 2 | Episode 2 | 21 September 2017 | Thursday 7:30 pm | 978,000 | 1 | 112,000 | 1 | 1,090,000 | |
| 3 | Episode 3 | 27 September 2017 | Wednesday 7:30 pm | 901,000 | 6 | 66,000 | 2 | 967,000 | |
| 4 | Episode 4 | 28 September 2017 | Thursday 7:30 pm | 809,000 | 5 | 91,000 | 2 | 900,000 | |
| 5 | Episode 5 | 4 October 2017 | Wednesday 7:30 pm | 812,000 | 7 | 60,000 | 6 | 872,000 | |
| 6 | Episode 6 | 5 October 2017 | Thursday 7:30 pm | 793,000 | 7 | 113,000 | 4 | 906,000 | |
| 7 | Episode 7 | 11 October 2017 | Wednesday 7:30 pm | 840,000 | 6 | 60,000 | 7 | 900,000 | |
| 8 | Episode 8 | 12 October 2017 | Thursday 7:30 pm | 985,000 | 1 | 119,000 | 1 | 1,104,000 | |
| 9 | Episode 9 | 18 October 2017 | Wednesday 7:30 pm | 828,000 | 7 | 55,000 | 7 | 883,000 | |
| 10 | Episode 10 | 19 October 2017 | Thursday 7:30 pm | 1,019,000 | 1 | 117,000 | 1 | 1,136,000 | |
| 11 | Episode 11 | 25 October 2017 | Wednesday 7:30 pm | 1,180,000 | 1 | 39,000 | 1 | 1,219,000 | |
| 12 | Finale Final Decision | 26 October 2017 | Thursday 7:30 pm Thursday 9:00 pm | 1,316,000 1,640,000 | 2 1 | 39,000 54,000 | 2 1 | 1,355,000 1,694,000 | |
