= Bachelor in Paradise (Australian TV series) =

Australian reality television series

- Also known as: Bachelor in Paradise Australia
- Genre: Reality
- Created by: Mike Fleiss
- Based on: Bachelor in Paradise
- Presented by: Osher Günsberg
- Country of origin: Australia
- Original language: English
- No. of seasons: 3
- No. of episodes: 42

Production
- Production location: Fiji
- Production company: Warner Bros. International Television Production

Original release
- Network: Network 10
- Release: 25 March 2018 – 9 August 2020

Related
- The Bachelor Australia; The Bachelorette Australia

Bachelor in Paradise Australia is an Australian elimination-style reality competition television series which is an adaptation of the American series of the same name. It is a spin-off of The Bachelor Australia and The Bachelorette Australia and features previous contestants who have been featured on those shows. The programme is hosted by Osher Günsberg and first premiered on Network Ten on 25 March 2018.

In October 2020, it was announced the series would not be returning to Network 10 in 2021, however it could return in the future.

== Plot ==
The show begins with an uneven number of men (bachelors) and women (bachelorettes). At every rose ceremony, either the men or the women have the power of handing out roses, with control switching each time. Those left without a rose are immediately sent home. New bachelors or bachelorettes are introduced each week, often arriving with a date card. By the end, there will be few couples remaining and they will need to decide whether to continue their relationship outside of Paradise or go their separate ways.

== After Paradise ==
A 'behind-the-scenes' show called After Paradise aired during season 1 after the rose ceremony each week on 10Play. It gave viewers an opportunity to have a peek at what happens in paradise that didn't make it to air. After Paradise was discontinued in season 2 and was replaced by a weekly Insider Guide hosted by Osher Günsberg.

== Season summary ==
Season	Original Run	Couples	Proposal	Still together	Relationship notes
1	25 March 2018 - 30 April 2018	Jarrod Woodgate & Keira Maguire	No	No	Woodgate and Maguire chose to enter into a relationship in the finale. They announced their separation in August 2018. Woodgate and Maguire reunited in late 2018, before splitting for good in August 2019.
1	25 March 2018 - 30 April 2018	Grant Kemp & Ali Oetjen	No	No	Kemp and Oetjen chose to enter into a relationship, however an update in the finale revealed they had ended their relationship. It was also revealed that Oetjen would be the Bachelorette in the upcoming season.
1	25 March 2018 - 30 April 2018	Sam Cochrane & Tara Pavlovic	Yes	No	Cochrane and Pavlovic got engaged in the finale. On 30 June 2018, they announced their separation.
2	9 April 2019 — 2 May 2019	Davey Lloyd & Florence Moerenhout	No	No	Moerenhout decided to end her relationship with Lloyd in the finale.
2	9 April 2019 — 2 May 2019	Bill Goldsmith & Alex Nation	No	No	Goldsmith and Nation chose to enter into a relationship in the finale, however in the 'tell all' episode, it was revealed they had ended their relationship.
2	9 April 2019 — 2 May 2019	Nathan Favro & Tenille Favios	No	No	Favro and Favios chose to enter into a relationship in the finale, however in the 'tell all' episode, it was revealed they had ended their relationship.
3	15 July 2020 — 9 August 2020	Matt Whyatt & Renee Barrett	No	No	Barrett and Whyatt chose to enter into a relationship, however immediately after the finale aired, Barrett revealed she and Whyatt had split shortly after filming wrapped.
3	15 July 2020 — 9 August 2020	Conor Canning & Mary Viturino	No	Yes	Canning and Viturino chose to enter into a relationship in the finale. They have three daughters together; Chanel (Viturino's from previous relationship), Summer (born 26 March 2021) and Luna (born 19 May 2022). The couple announced their engagement on 26 June 2023. A week later on 4 July 2023, the pair announced they are expecting their fourth child.
3	15 July 2020 — 9 August 2020	Glenn Smith & Alisha Aitken-Radburn	No	Yes	Smith and Aitken-Radburn chose to enter into a relationship in the finale. They announced their engagement on 13 October 2021. On 22 April 2023, they were married in Denmark, Western Australia.

== Ratings ==
Season	Episodes	Premiere			Finale					Ref
Season	Episodes	Premiere date	Premiere ratings	Rank	Finale date	Finale ratings (Grand final)	Rank	Finale ratings (The Proposal/Tell-All)	Rank	Ref
1	16	25 March 2018	750,000	#4	30 April 2018	661,000	#12	774,000	#8	
2	13	9 April 2019	553,000	#12	2 May 2019	454,000	#12	417,000	#17	
3	13	15 July 2020	507,000	#17	9 August 2020	414,000	#12	480,000	#9	
