= The Bachelorette (Australian TV series) season 2 =

The Bachelorette
- Season 2
- Starring: Georgia Love
- Presented by: Osher Günsberg
- No. of contestants: 18
- Winner: Lee Elliott
- Runner-up: Matty Johnson
- No. of episodes: 12

Release
- Original network: Network Ten
- Original release: 21 September – 27 October 2016

Season chronology
- ← Previous; Season 1 Next → Season 3

The second season of The Bachelorette Australia premiered on Network Ten on 21 September 2016. The season features Georgia Love, a 27-year-old journalist from Melbourne, Victoria, originally from Tasmania, courting 18 men.

== Contestants ==
The season began with 16 contestants. In episode 5, two "intruders" were brought into the competition, bringing the total number of contestants to 18.

Name	Age	Hometown	Occupation	Eliminated
Lee Elliott	35	Melbourne, Victoria	Mechanical Plumber	Winner
Matty Johnson	29	Sydney, New South Wales	Marketing manager	Runner-Up
Jake Ellis	30	Gold Coast, Queensland	Sales Professional	Episode 11
Courtney Dober	30	Sydney, New South Wales	Industrial Designer	Episode 10
Cameron Cranley	26	Perth, Western Australia	Firefighter	Episode 9
Clancy Ryan	29	Brisbane, Queensland	Medical Sales Rep	Episode 8
Matt Dunne	29	Melbourne, Victoria	General manager	Episode 7
Rhys Chilton	29	Brisbane, Queensland	Model	Episode 7
Sam Johnston	27	Sydney, New South Wales	Electrician	Episode 7
Todd Jesson	26	Melbourne, Victoria	Musician	Episode 7
Ryan Palk	28	Perth, Western Australia	Sailing Coach	Episode 6
Matteo	31	Sydney, New South Wales	Model	Episode 5
Tommy Saggus	31	Brisbane, Queensland	Employment Coach	Episode 4
Aaron Brady	34	Sunshine Coast, Queensland	Marketing CEO	Episode 3
Jay Geering	-	Adelaide, South Australia	Wellness Coach	Episode 3
Ben Lyall	32	Wollongong, New South Wales	Miner	Episode 2
Carlos Fang	29	Melbourne, Victoria	Entrepreneur	Episode 1
Dale Brown	29	Brisbane, Queensland	Personal Trainer	Episode 1

=== Future appearances ===
==== The Bachelor Winter Games ====
Courtney will represent The Bachelor Australia in The Bachelor Winter Games; a Winter Olympics themed spin-off of the American version of The Bachelor franchise.

== Call-Out Order ==
Georgia's call-out order
#	Bachelors	Episode											
#	Bachelors	1	2	3	4	5	6	7	8	9	10 (Note: The rose ceremony was cancelled due to Courtney's elimination prior to the rose ceremony. Therefore, the remaining contestants are listed in alphabetical order.)	11	12
1	Cameron	Courtney	Jake	Lee	Courtney	Clancy	Cameron	Courtney	Matty	Lee	Jake	Matty	Lee
2	Jake	Lee	Clancy	Matty	Jake	Matty	Matty	Cameron	Lee	Matty	Lee	Lee	Matty
3	Rhys	Cameron	Cameron	Cameron	Sam	Matt	Jake	Matty	Jake	Jake	Matty	Jake	
4	Courtney	Clancy	Rhys	Courtney	Clancy	Lee	Rhys	Jake	Courtney	Courtney	Courtney		
5	Dale	Jake	Tommy	Ryan	Matty	Todd	Lee	Clancy	Cameron	Cameron			
6	Ryan	Ryan	Lee	Clancy	Rhys	Cameron	Courtney	Lee	Clancy				
7	Matty	Jay	Matt	Rhys	Ryan	Sam	Sam	Matt; Todd					
8	Carlos	Matty	Sam	Jake	Lee	Rhys	Todd	Matt; Todd					
9	Lee	Tommy	Courtney	Tommy	Matt	Jake	Clancy	Rhys; Sam					
10	Aaron	Matt	Matty	Sam	Cameron	Ryan	Matt	Rhys; Sam					
11	Jay	Aaron	Jay	Matt	Tommy	Courtney	Ryan						
12	Tommy	Rhys	Aaron	Aaron; Jay		Matteo							
13	Matt	Ben	Ryan	Aaron; Jay									
14	Ben	Sam	Ben										
15	Clancy	Carlos; Dale											
16	Sam	Carlos; Dale											
17	Matteo (Note: This contestant was an intruder and did not join the competition until Episode 5.)												
18	Todd												

Color Key

The contestant received the first impression rose, having the ability to plan all dates for one week.
The contestant received a rose during a date.
The contestant was eliminated outside the rose ceremony.
The contestant was eliminated during a date.
The contestant was eliminated.
The contestant quit the competition.
The contestant won the competition.

== Episodes ==
=== Episode 1 ===
Original airdate: 21 September 2016

Event	Description
First impression rose	Courtney
Rose ceremony	Carlos & Dale were eliminated

=== Episode 2 ===
Original airdate: 22 September 2016

Event	Description
Single date	Jake
Group date	Rhys, Courtney, Ben, Matt, Ryan, Aaron, Clancy, Lee, Cameron and Sam
Rose ceremony	Ben was eliminated

=== Episode 3 ===
Original airdate: 28 September 2016

Event	Description
Single date	Lee
Group date	Tommy, Clancy, Cameron, Sam, Jay, Rhys, Aaron and Matty
Rose ceremony	Aaron & Jay were eliminated

=== Episode 4 ===
Original airdate: 29 September 2016

Event	Description
Single date	Courtney
Group date	Courtney, Ryan, Tommy, Matt, Cameron, Jake and Clancy
Rose ceremony	Tommy was eliminated

=== Episode 5 ===
Original airdate: 5 October 2016

Event	Description
Single date	Clancy
Group date	Everyone
Intruders	Matteo & Todd were introduced
Rose ceremony	Matteo was eliminated

=== Episode 6 ===
Original airdate: 6 October 2016

Event	Description
Single date	Cameron; Matty
Group date	Lee, Jake, Courtney, Sam, Matt, Ryan, Rhys and Todd
Rose ceremony	Ryan was eliminated

=== Episode 7 ===
Original airdate: 12 October 2016

Event	Description
Single date	Courtney
Two-on-one date	Rhys & Sam; Rhys & Sam were eliminated.
Rose ceremony	Matt & Todd were eliminated.

=== Episode 8 ===
Original airdate: 13 October 2016

Event	Description
Single date	Matty
Group date	Cameron, Clancy, Courtney, Jake and Lee
Rose ceremony	Clancy was eliminated

=== Episode 9 ===
Original airdate: 19 October 2016

Event	Description
Single date	Lee
Group date	Everyone
Rose ceremony	Cameron was eliminated

=== Episode 10 ===
Original airdate: 20 October 2016

Event	Description
Hometown #1	Matty - Sydney, New South Wales
Hometown #2	Jake - Gold Coast, Queensland
Hometown #3	Lee - Melbourne, Victoria
Hometown #4	Courtney - Sydney, New South Wales
Rose ceremony	Courtney was eliminated prior to the rose ceremony.

=== Episode 11 ===
Original airdate: 26 October 2016

Event	Description
Single Date #1	Lee
Single Date #2	Jake
Single Date #3	Matty
Rose ceremony	Jake was eliminated

=== Episode 12 ===
Original airdate: 27 October 2016

Event	Description
Meet Georgia's Family #1	Matty
Meet Georgia's Family #2	Lee
Final Date #1	Matty
Final Date #2	Lee
Final Decision:	Lee is the winner

== Ratings ==
No.	Title	Air date	Timeslot	Overnight ratings		Consolidated ratings		Total viewers	Ref(s)
No.	Title	Air date	Timeslot	Viewers	Rank	Viewers	Rank	Total viewers	Ref(s)
1	Episode 1	21 September 2016	Wednesday 7:30 pm	655,000	14	27,000	14	682,000	
2	Episode 2	22 September 2016	Thursday 7:30 pm	703,000	9	57,000	7	760,000	
3	Episode 3 (Note: Viewership from Adelaide is unusually low as a result of a statewide power outage in South Australia.)	28 September 2016	Wednesday 7:30 pm	570,000	14	54,000	14	624,000	
4	Episode 4	29 September 2016	Thursday 7:30 pm	599,000	13	71,000	10	670,000	
5	Episode 5	5 October 2016	Wednesday 7:30 pm	561,000	16	56,000	15	617,000	
6	Episode 6	6 October 2016	Thursday 7:30 pm	588,000	13	71,000	12	659,000	
7	Episode 7	12 October 2016	Wednesday 7:30 pm	624,000	12	64,000	14	688,000	
8	Episode 8	13 October 2016	Thursday 7:30 pm	613,000	11	87,000	10	700,000	
9	Episode 9	19 October 2016	Wednesday 7:30 pm	592,000	14	49,000	15	641,000	
10	Episode 10	20 October 2016	Thursday 7:30 pm	692,000	7	63,000	6	755,000	
11	Episode 11	26 October 2016	Wednesday 7:30 pm	697,000	9	21,000	10	718,000	
12	Finale Final Decision	27 October 2016	Thursday 7:30 pm Thursday 9:00 pm	790,000 972,000	6 1	30,000 37,000	6 1	820,000 1,009,000	
