= The Bachelorette (Australian TV series) =

- Also known as: The Bachelorette Australia
- Genre: Reality
- Created by: Mike Fleiss
- Based on: The Bachelorette
- Presented by: Osher Günsberg
- Country of origin: Australia
- Original language: English
- No. of seasons: 7
- No. of episodes: 80

Production
- Production locations: Hunters Hill, New South Wales (2015); Glenorie, New South Wales (2016–17); Oxford Falls, New South Wales (2018–20); Dural, New South Wales (2021)
- Running time: 60–90 minutes
- Production companies: Shine Australia (season 1); Warner Bros. International Television Production (season 2–7)

Original release
- Network: Network 10
- Release: 23 September 2015 – 25 November 2021

Related
- The Bachelor Australia; Bachelor in Paradise Australia

The Bachelorette Australia is a reality television adaptation of the American series of the same name, and a spin-off of The Bachelor Australia. The series, hosted by Osher Günsberg, premiered on 23 September 2015 on Network 10.

It was announced in November 2015 that unlike season 1 which was produced by Shine Australia, seasons 2–present would be produced by Warner Bros. International Television Production.

In June 2022, it was announced the series would not be returning to Network 10 in 2022, however it could return in the future.

== Premise ==
The series revolves around a single bachelorette and a pool of romantic interests. The conflicts in the series, both internal and external, stem from the elimination-style format of the show. Early in the season, the bachelorette goes on large group dates with the contestants, with the majority of sutors eliminated. As the season progresses, contestants are also eliminated on single dates and on elimination two-on-one dates. The process culminates with hometown visits to the families of the final contestants, overnight dates, should they choose to accept, at exotic locations with the final three contestants, and interaction with the bachelorette's family with the final two contestants.

Most seasons of the show are heterosexual-centric (a female seeking a male partner), however, the 7th season of the show features a bisexual bachelorette courting both male and female contestants.

== Elimination process ==
=== Single date ===
The bachelorette and one contestant go on a date. The bachelorette is given a chance to get to know the contestant on a more personal level, and the dates are usually very intimate. If the date goes well and the bachelorette wishes to spend more time with the contestant or get to know them further, she may present them with a rose at the date. This means that during the rose ceremony at the end of each episode, they will be safe and there will be no chance of them going home.

=== Group date ===
The bachelorette and a group of contestants participate in an activity. Sometimes the activity takes the form of a competition, with the winner or winners spending more time with the bachelorette. The bachelorette typically presents a rose to the contestant who makes the best impression during the group date.

=== Rose ceremony ===
The contestants who have not been eliminated stand in rows at one end of the room, and the bachelorette faces them. The bachelorette has a tray with roses. The bachelorette takes a rose and calls a contestant by name. The contestant steps forward, and the bachelorette asks, "Will you accept this rose?" The contestant accepts, takes the rose, and makes his way to the other side of the room (where all the contestants who have been given a rose are required to stand.) After all roses are distributed, the host tells the contestants who did not receive a rose to "please take a moment now to say your good-byes."

=== Hometown visits ===
The bachelorette visits the hometowns and families of each of the four remaining contestants. At the rose ceremony, one person is eliminated, leaving three. Another episode airs before the final rose ceremony, leaving two contestants.

=== The finale ===
The two remaining contestants separately meet with the bachelorette's family. At the end of the episode, the bachelorette will reveal their true love to the person of her choice. That contestant is said to be the winner of The Bachelorette Australia.

== Seasons ==
Season	Original run	Bachelorette	Profile	Winner	Proposal	Still Together
1	23 September – 22 October 2015	Sam Frost	Age: 26; Location: Melbourne, Victoria; Profession: Marketing Manager	Sasha Mielczarek	No	No
1	Frost chose to enter into a relationship with Mielczarek. On 27 December 2016, after 18 months of dating, the couple announced they had split.					
2	21 September – 27 October 2016	Georgia Love	Age: 27; Location: Melbourne, Victoria; Profession: Journalist	Lee Elliott	No	No
2	Love chose to enter into a relationship with Elliott. On 1 September 2019, the couple announced their engagement. After postponing their wedding twice due to Covid-19 restrictions, the couple married on 5 March 2021 in Hobart, Tasmania. They announced their divorce on March 1, 2025.					
3	20 September – 26 October 2017	Sophie Monk	Age: 37; Location: Gold Coast, Queensland; Profession: Radio and TV Personality	Stu Laundy	No	No
3	Monk chose to enter into a relationship with Laundy. On January 26, 2018, Monk announced her split from Laundy. Laundy later revealed he first knew of their break-up from Monk's social media post.					
4	10 October – 15 November 2018	Ali Oetjen	Age: 32; Location: Adelaide, South Australia; Profession: Healthy Fitness Trainer	Taite Radley	No	No
4	Oetjen chose to enter into a relationship with Radley. On 25 July 2020, after nearly two years of dating, the couple announced their separation.					
5	9 October – 14 November 2019	Angie Kent	Age: 29; Location: Sunshine Coast, Queensland; Profession: TV Personality	Carlin Sterritt	No	No
5	Kent chose to enter into a relationship with Sterritt. They announced their break-up on 1 July 2020.					
6	7 October – 5 November 2020	Elly Miles	Age: 25; Location: Newcastle, New South Wales; Profession: Nurse	Frazer Neate	No	No
6	7 October – 5 November 2020	Becky Miles	Age: 30; Location: Newcastle, New South Wales; Profession: Defence Contracting Specialist	Pete Mann	No	No
6	Elly chose to enter into a relationship with Frazer. On 4 December 2020, Miles confirmed that she had split from Neate. Becky chose to enter into a relationship with Pete. Miles announced the break-up on 6 November 2020, citing her relationship with Mann only lasted three days.					
7	20 October – 25 November 2021	Brooke Blurton	Age: 26; Location: Melbourne, Victoria; Profession: Youth Worker	Darvid Garayeli	No	No
7	Blurton chose to enter into a relationship with Garayeli. On 2 January 2022, Garayeli announced that he and Blurton had parted ways.					

== Ratings ==
Season	Episodes	Premiere			Finale					Ref
Season	Episodes	Premiere date	Premiere ratings	Rank	Finale date	Finale ratings (Finale)	Rank	Finale ratings (Final decision)	Rank	Ref
1	10	23 September 2015	0.875	8	22 October 2015	1.241	2	1.520	1	
2	12	21 September 2016	0.655	14	27 October 2016	0.790	6	0.972	1	
3	12	20 September 2017	0.951	2	26 October 2017	1.316	2	1.640	1	
4	12	10 October 2018	0.631	11	15 November 2018	0.766	4	0.926	1	
5	12	9 October 2019	0.716	6	14 November 2019	0.848	3	0.992	1	
6	10	7 October 2020	0.628	9	5 November 2020	0.500	12	0.573	9	
7	12	20 October 2021	0.397	14	25 November 2021	0.361	14	0.439	11	

== Awards and nominations ==
Year	Award	Category	Recipients and nominees	Result	Refs.
2016	Logie Awards of 2016	Best Reality Program	The Bachelorette Australia	Nominated	
