= Osher Günsberg =

Australian television presenter (born 1974)

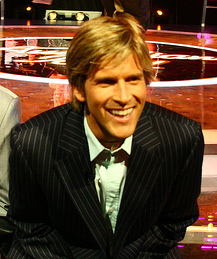
- Günsberg on the set of Australian Idol (c. 2007)
- Born: Andrew Günsberg; 29 March 1974 (age 52); London, England
- Other name: Andrew G
- Citizenship: Australia; United Kingdom
- Occupations: Television and radio presenter, journalist
- Years active: 1994–present
- Known for: The Masked Singer Australia; The Bachelor Australia; The Bachelorette Australia; Bachelor in Paradise Australia; Bondi Rescue
- Spouses: Noa Tishby (m. 2008; div. 2011) Audrey Griffen (m. 2016)
- Children: 2
- Website: www.oshergunsberg.com

Osher Günsberg (born Andrew Günsberg; 29 March 1974), formerly known by the stage name Andrew G, is an Australian television and radio presenter and journalist. He was the host of the reality TV series The Bachelor Australia, The Bachelorette Australia, and Bachelor in Paradise Australia. He is the narrator of the factual TV series Bondi Rescue as well as the host of the music talent show The Masked Singer Australia.

He is also known for his hosting roles on Channel [V], Australian Idol, Live to Dance on CBS, and radio shows including Take 40 Australia and The Hot Hits. Günsberg also narrated the factual television program Recruits. He was a regular contributor to The Project.

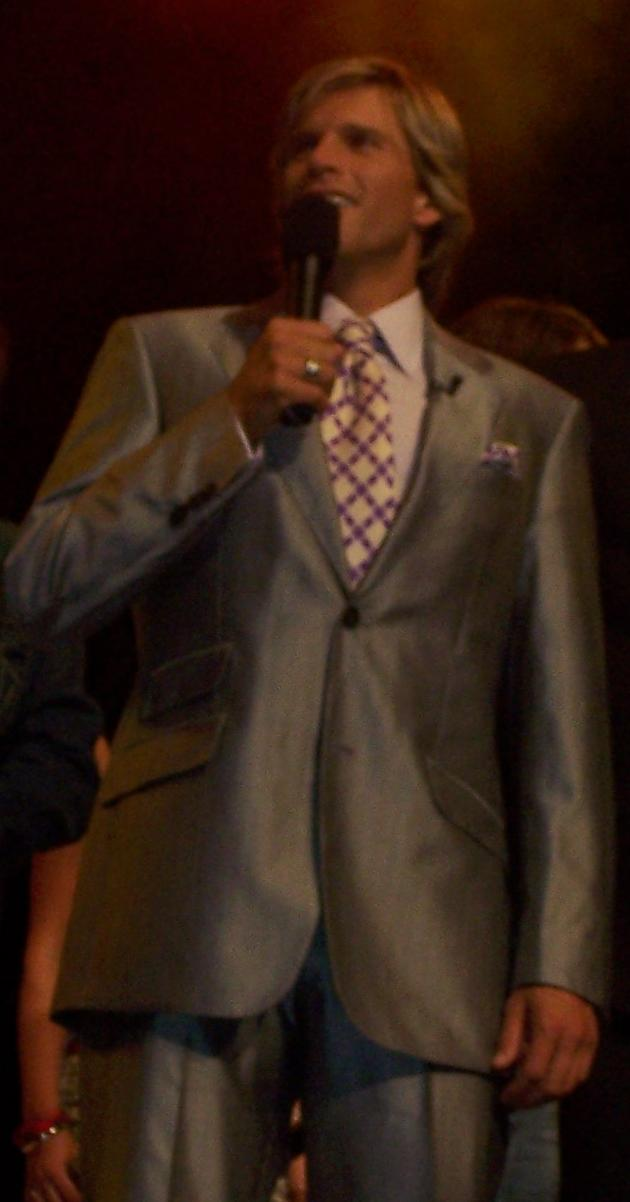
Günsberg in 2006

== Early life and education ==
Osher Günsberg was born Andrew Günsberg on 29 March 1974 in London, England, to a Czech-Jewish father and a Lithuanian mother. He moved to Australia when he was four months old. He grew up in Brisbane, Queensland.

He developed an interest in music, learning to read and write sheet music as well as play several instruments. He later worked as a roadie, before performing in several Brisbane-based bands.

== Music ==
Osher was active in the Brisbane band scene between 1994 and 1997, playing electric bass in Feeble's Junky and double bass in Resin Dogs.

== Radio ==
At 20, Günsberg started working as a "Black Thunder" driver and did on-air midnight-to-dawn shifts for B105 radio station in Brisbane, during which time he bore the nickname "Spidey". He filled in for late-night announcing shifts, before taking on the role of the regular midnight-dawn announcer.

At SAFM he adopted the stage name of "Andrew G", after his program director shortened his surname to its first letter. This change led to confusion between Günsberg and Australian former rugby league footballer for the Brisbane Broncos, Andrew Gee. In 2009, he decided to drop his abbreviated stage name and revert to his full surname.

In December 2009, he launched a re-formatted version of The Hot Hits, bringing the show live every week around Australia from Los Angeles. The show was re-named The Hot Hits Live from LA. In July 2010, after only six months on air, the show was nominated for an Australian Commercial Radio Award in the category of "Best Syndicated Program".

In November 2015, Southern Cross Austereo announced that Günsberg would join HIT 105's breakfast show with Abby Coleman and Stav Davidson.

== Podcasts ==
=== Better Than Yesterday ===
In 2013, Günsberg began releasing "The Osher Günsberg Podcast", a weekly interview show where he openly discusses and shares his own mental health journey, while having conversations with high profile guests. In 2019, the show's name changed to "Better Than Yesterday" to reflect the way that the podcast had developed from a straight interview conversation in the early years to a deeper exploration of how his guests overcome life's challenges. "Better Than Yesterday" is now released on a Monday and Friday in Australia.

=== DadPod ===
In 2019, Osher started a second weekly podcast with Charlie Clausen called "DadPod". As the two men both became fathers to babies within a month of each other, the show follows their learnings as they "forge a new understanding of what it is to be a modern father and how they helped their partners have the best birth possible."

== Television ==
=== Channel [V] ===
For seven years, Günsberg worked mainly in live broadcasting hosting the flagship request show, By Demand (later whatUwant) and various late night shows (including The Joint).

In 2006, it was announced that Günsberg would be leaving Channel [V].

=== Network 10 ===
Günsberg has appeared on Studio 10, The Project, All Star Family Feud, Thank God You're Here, Celebrity Joker Poker, Good News Week, Ready Steady Cook, Celebrity Name Game and Chris & Julia's Sunday Night Takeaway.

In 2003, Günsberg became co-host (with James Mathison) of Australian Idol on Network Ten. For this role, Günsberg was nominated for the Silver Logie in 2004. After Mathison announced that he was moving on to other projects, Günsberg hosted the seventh season of Australian Idol solo in 2009. He was also the compere of Network Ten's game show The Con Test.

He appeared on a celebrity episode of the Australian version of Ready Steady Cook in October 2005. As a committed vegan, his recipe ideas were not extremely well received by the audience. According to Günsberg, the audience's response when he revealed tofu on the menu, was "similar to the look you see on peoples [sic] faces when they view two dogs rooting on the side of the road — puzzled, curious, but all together uncomfortable."

He was one of the co-hosts of the televised Australia Day Eve celebrations on 25 January 2006. In October 2006, he was a contestant on the Australian comedy TV Show, Thank God You're Here, and played in Celebrity Joker Poker, winning $10,000 for charity. In 2007, he hosted The Con Test. In February 2007, he appeared as himself on the soap opera Neighbours. From 2007–09, he co-hosted the Sydney New Year's Eve telecast alongside Kim Watkins and Fuzzy.

Günsberg also narrated the Network 10 / Cordell-Jigsaw productions, Bondi Rescue and the second season of Recruits. He was a contestant in Season 2 Episode 34 of Good News Week that aired on Channel 10 on 14 September 2009. He has been an occasional guest host for Charlie Pickering and was a regular contributor to The Project. From 2013–2023, he was the host of the reality television series The Bachelor Australia. From 2015–2021, he was the host of the reality television series The Bachelorette Australia.

In 2017, Günsberg made a cameo appearance as himself on episode 4 of Offspring. Günsberg assumed his role as The Bachelor Australia host on Offspring and popped up in a kitchen scene with Nina (played by Asher Keddie). He offered Nina some friendly advice as she hosted a dinner party with her boyfriend Harry (played by Alexander England) and his ex-girlfriend Georgie (played by Emily Barclay).

From 2018–2020, he was the host of the reality television series Bachelor in Paradise Australia.

In July 2019, it was announced that he will be the host of the music talent show The Masked Singer Australia.

=== CBS ===
In October 2010, CBS announced that Günsberg would be the host of the Paula Abdul dance competition Live to Dance. The show made its debut in January 2011 on CBS. It was announced that Live to Dance would not return for a second season.

=== ABC ===
In 2012, Günsberg co-hosted the photographic competition show Photo Finish. In 2017, he made a cameo appearance as himself in the first episode of War on Waste.

== Personal life ==
Günsberg holds dual British and Australian citizenship.

In 2008, he married Israeli actress and producer Noa Tishby. On 27 December 2011, he announced on Twitter that his marriage to Tishby was over.

In September 2010, Günsberg exhibited a year of daily photographic self portraits (June 2009 – June 2010) at Mart Gallery in Surry Hills, Sydney, with part of the proceeds going to Lifeline.

At the age of 38, he decided to change his name to Osher – Hebrew for 'happiness' – in order to signal his changed outlook and attitude toward life. He claims that "something about being Osher just feels right". He is an avid cyclist. In October 2016, following criticism for attending Derby Day during the Melbourne Spring Racing Carnival, Günsberg stated "I say that I'm vegan because it's the quickest way to get the explanation across but the truth is I've never really called myself vegan".

In December 2016, Günsberg married freelance makeup artist Audrey Griffen, becoming a stepfather to her daughter Georgia. The couple met while Günsberg was filming season two of The Bachelor Australia, where Griffen was working as a makeup artist.

=== Mental health advocacy ===
In August 2017, he revealed he had been living with depression for many years, as well as social anxiety disorder and obsessive–compulsive disorder.

His memoir, Back, After the Break, was published by HarperCollins in August 2018. He has been open about his battles with psychosis, alcoholism, and suicidal ideation.

Preceded by Geoff Huegill	Cleo Bachelor of the Year; 2004	Succeeded by Ryan Phelan
