= The Bachelor (Australian TV series) season 3 =

The Bachelor
- Season 3
- Starring: Sam Wood
- Presented by: Osher Günsberg
- No. of contestants: 21
- Winner: Snezana Markoski
- Runner-up: Lana Jeavons-Fellows
- No. of episodes: 16

Release
- Original network: Network Ten
- Original release: 29 July – 17 September 2015

Season chronology
- ← Previous; Season 2 Next → Season 4

The third season of The Bachelor premiered on 29 July 2015. This season features Sam Wood, a 34-year-old Melbourne-based business owner and personal trainer, and founder of children's fitness company Gecko Kids, originally from Tasmania; courting 21 women.

== Contestants ==
The season began with 19 contestants. In episode 9, two "intruders" were brought into the competition, bringing the total number of contestants to 21.

Name	Age	Hometown	Occupation	Eliminated
Snezana Markoski	34	Perth, Western Australia	Scientific Sales Rep	Winner
Lana Jeavons-Fellows	27	Berowra, New South Wales	Communications Assistant	Runner-up
Sarah Mackay	25	Mornington, Victoria	Event Manager	Episode 15
Heather Maltman	29	Brisbane, Queensland	Filmmaker	Episode 14
Nina Rolleston	28	Brisbane, Queensland	Wedding Planner	Episode 13
Rachel Moore	29	Brisbane, Queensland	Food Blogger	Episode 12
Ebru Dallikavak	31	Melbourne	Portfolio Manager	Episode 10
Emily Simms	31	Melbourne	Advertising Executive	Episode 9 (Quit)
Bec Chin	28	Central Coast, New South Wales	Dietitian	Episode 9
Rachel Jones	28	Adelaide, South Australia	Charity Worker	Episode 8
Jasmin Brown	24	Brisbane, Queensland	Marketing Graduate	Episode 7
Jacinda Gugliemino	33	Sydney	Personal Assistant	Episode 6
Sandra Rato	27	Melbourne	Primary P.E. Teacher	Episode 5
Laura Musgrove	28	Sydney	Veterinary Surgeon	Episode 4
Joni Hodson	31	Melbourne	Motivational Speaker	Episode 4
Madeleine Van Orsouw	26	Melbourne	Fertility Nurse	Episode 3
Krystal Steele	30	Cannonvale, Queensland	Travel Agent	Episode 2
Tessa Moritz	33	Melbourne	Account Manager	Episode 2
Reshael Sirputh	28	Brisbane, Queensland	Accounts Manager	Episode 2
Jessica Lea	24	Gold Coast, Queensland	Hospitality Manager	Episode 1
Zilda Williams	31	Gold Coast, Queensland	Model	Episode 1

== Call-out order ==
Sam's call-out order
No.	Bachelorettes	Episodes															
No.	Bachelorettes	1	2	3	4	5	6	7	8	9	10	11	12	13	14	15	16
1	Snezana	Sarah	Sarah	Snezana	Heather	Nina	N/A	Emily	Snezana	Sarah	Heather	Lana	Sarah	Lana	Sarah	Lana	Snezana
2	Sarah	Heather	Jacinda	Sarah	Nina	Sarah	N/A	Sarah	Heather	Lana	Lana	Heather	Heather	Snezana	Snezana	Snezana	Lana
3	Laura	Snezana	Nina	Joni	Jasmin	Ebru	N/A	Bec	Sarah	Heather	Nina	Snezana	Nina	Sarah	Lana	Sarah	
4	Rachel J.	Joni	Heather	Emily	Jacinda	Heather	N/A	Ebru	Nina	Snezana	Snezana	Nina; Rachel M. Sarah	Snezana	Heather	Heather		
5	Ebru	Bec	Emily	Heather	Snezana	Jasmin	N/A	Snezana	Emily	Ebru	Sarah	Nina; Rachel M. Sarah	Lana	Nina			
6	Nina	Rachel J.	Snezana	Jacinda	Emily	Snezana	N/A	Heather	Ebru	Rachel M.	Rachel M.	Nina; Rachel M. Sarah	Rachel M.				
7	Jasmin	Ebru	Rachel J.	Bec	Sarah	Bec	N/A	Rachel J.	Bec	Nina	Ebru						
8	Heather	Nina	Sandra	Rachel J.	Bec	Emily	N/A	Nina	Rachel J.	Emily							
9	Jacinda	Tessa	Joni	Nina	Sandra	Jacinda	N/A	Jasmin		Bec							
10	Bec	Krystal	Bec	Jasmin	Rachel J.	Rachel J.	Jacinda										
11	Joni	Jacinda	Laura	Sandra	Ebru	Sandra											
12	Jessica	Madeleine	Ebru	Ebru	Joni; Laura												
13	Tessa	Emily	Jasmin	Laura	Joni; Laura												
14	Reshael	Jasmin	Madeleine	Madeleine													
15	Madeleine	Laura	Krystal; Reshael; Tessa														
16	Krystal	Reshael	Krystal; Reshael; Tessa														
17	Zilda	Sandra	Krystal; Reshael; Tessa														
18	Sandra	Jessica; Zilda															
19	Emily	Jessica; Zilda															
20	Lana																
21	Rachel M.																

Color key

The contestant received a white rose and with it the power to ask the Bachelor on a date at any time.
The contestant received a first impression rose.
The contestant received a rose during the date.
The contestant was part of a non-elimination bottom three.
The contestant was eliminated outside the rose ceremony.
The contestant was eliminated on a date.
The contestant was eliminated.
The contestant quit the competition.
The contestant won the competition.

== Episodes ==
=== Episode 1 ===
Original airdate: 29 July 2015

Event	Description
First impression rose	Sarah
White rose	Heather
Rose ceremony	Zilda and Jessica were eliminated

=== Episode 2 ===
Original airdate: 30 July 2015

Event	Description
One-on-one date	Sarah
Group date	Heather, Tessa, Jasmin, Emily, Madeleine, Snezana, Reshael, Jacinda, Sandra, Bec, Krystal, and Joni
Rose ceremony	Tessa, Reshael, and Krystal were eliminated

=== Episode 3 ===
Original airdate 5 August 2015

Event	Description
One-on-one date	Snezana was given single date by the Bachelor
One-on-one date (Girl's vote)	Madeleine was voted to go on a single date
Rose ceremony	Madeleine was eliminated

=== Episode 4 ===
Original airdate: 6 August 2015

Event	Description
Single date (White Rose)	Heather
Group date	Joni, Ebru, Laura, Sarah, Rachel J., Sandra, Jasmin
One-on-one time	Joni
Rose ceremony	Laura and Joni were eliminated

=== Episode 5 ===
Original airdate 12 August 2015

Event	Description
One-on-one date	Nina
Group date	Sandra, Ebru, Bec, Jasmin, Jacinda, Snezana, Sarah and Heather
Rose ceremony	Sandra was eliminated

=== Episode 6 ===
Original airdate: 13 August 2015

Event	Description
One-on-one date	"Groundhog" Dates: Bec, Ebru, Jacinda
Group date	None
Rose ceremony	No Rose Ceremony, Jacinda was eliminated before the ceremony

=== Episode 7 ===
Original airdate 19 August 2015

Event	Description
One-on-one date	Emily
Group date	Ebru, Heather, Sarah, Snezana, Rachel J., Jasmin, Bec, Nina
Rose ceremony	Jasmin was eliminated

=== Episode 8 ===
Original airdate 20 August 2015

Event	Description
One-on-one date	Snezana
Group date	Rachel J., Heather, Bec, Emily, Nina
Rose ceremony	Rachel J. was eliminated

=== Episode 9 ===
Original airdate 26 August 2015

Event	Description
One-on-one date	Bec, Sarah
Group date	*None, two single dates instead
Intruders	Lana & Rachel M. introduced
Rose ceremony	Bec was eliminated during her single date Emily quits before last rose is handed out

=== Episode 10 ===
Original airdate 27 August 2015

Event	Description
One-on-one date	Heather
Group date	Ebru, Rachel M., Nina, Snezana, Lana
Rose ceremony	Ebru was eliminated

=== Episode 11 ===
Original airdate 2 September 2015

Event	Description
One-on-one date	Lana
Group date	Lana, Heather, Snezana, Sarah, Nina, Rachel M.
Rose ceremony	Neither Sarah, Rachel M., or Nina were eliminated

=== Episode 12 ===
Original airdate 3 September 2015

Event	Description
One-on-one date	Sarah
Group date	Everyone
Rose ceremony	Rachel M. was eliminated

=== Episode 13 ===
Original airdate 9 September 2015

Event	Description
One-on-one date	Lana, Snezana, Heather, Sarah, Nina
Group date	None
Rose ceremony	Nina was eliminated

=== Episode 14 ===
Original airdate 10 September 2015

Event	Description
First Hometown	Heather – Brisbane, Queensland
Second Hometown	Lana – Berowra, New South Wales
Third Hometown	Sarah – Mornington, Victoria
Fourth Hometown	Snezana – Perth, Western Australia
Rose ceremony	Heather was eliminated.

=== Episode 15 ===
Original airdate: 16 September 2015.

Event	Description
First One-on-one date	Snezana
Second One-on-one date	Lana
Third One-on-one date	Sarah
Rose ceremony:	Sarah was eliminated.

=== Episode 16 ===
Original airdate: 17 September 2015; filmed at Fernhill in Mulgoa.

Event	Description
First Meet Sam's family	Snezana
Second Meet Sam's family	Lana
First Final date	Lana
Second Final date	Snezana
Final decision:	Snezana is the winner

== Ratings ==
No.	Title	Air date	Overnight ratings		Consolidated ratings		Total viewers	Ref(s)
No.	Title	Air date	Viewers	Rank	Viewers	Rank	Total viewers	Ref(s)
1	Episode 1	29 July 2015	846,000	6	52,000	6	898,000	
2	Episode 2	30 July 2015	739,000	8	58,000	6	797,000	
3	Episode 3	5 August 2015	805,000	8	35,000	7	840,000	
4	Episode 4	6 August 2015	794,000	8	70,000	4	864,000	
5	Episode 5	12 August 2015	922,000	6	46,000	6	968,000	
6	Episode 6	13 August 2015	911,000	3	55,000	3	966,000	
7	Episode 7	19 August 2015	877,000	6	40,000	7	917,000	
8	Episode 8	20 August 2015	817,000	6	83,000	5	900,000	
9	Episode 9	26 August 2015	906,000	5	50,000	4	956,000	
10	Episode 10	27 August 2015	889,000	5	102,000	3	991,000	
11	Episode 11	2 September 2015	984,000	3	53,000	3	1,037,000	
12	Episode 12	3 September 2015	942,000	3	83,000	1	1,026,000	
13	Episode 13	9 September 2015	920,000	7	56,000	6	976,000	
14	Episode 14	10 September 2015	981,000	3	90,000	1	1,071,000	
15	Episode 15	16 September 2015	1,050,000	2	27,000	1	1,079,000	
16	Finale Final Decision	17 September 2015	1,228,000 1,482,000	2 1	40,000 37,000	2 1	1,268,000 1,519,000	
