= The Bachelor (Australian TV series) season 8 =

The Bachelor
- Season 8
- Starring: Locky Gilbert
- Presented by: Osher Günsberg
- No. of contestants: 25
- Winner: Irena Srbinovska
- Runner-up: Bella Varelis
- No. of episodes: 14

Release
- Original network: Network 10
- Original release: 12 August – 24 September 2020

Season chronology
- ← Previous; Season 7 Next → Season 9

The eighth season of The Bachelor premiered on 12 August 2020. This season features Locky Gilbert, a 30-year-old adventure tour guide from Perth, Western Australia. Gilbert previously appeared on the fourth and seventh seasons of Australian Survivor, where he finished in fifth and twelfth place respectively.

As a result of the COVID-19 pandemic, filming in the mansion was suspended midway through the season. Two virtual episodes (referred to "Love In Lockdown" on the show) were produced during the hiatus via virtually through videoconferences. Production resumed in June throughout Australia on a lockdown format, Osher Günsberg continued to host at the mansion in Sydney, while Gilbert was isolated in Perth and the remaining contestants in their respective hometowns, the show stated that they would be unable to ensure the safety of contestants and crew, especially with the need for safety precautions which would need to be implemented and government restrictions such as social distancing and travel bans.

== Contestants ==
The season began with 23 contestants. Kaitlyn entered as an intruder in episode 2, and Bec entered as an intruder in episode 9, bringing the total number of contestants to 25.

Name	Age	Hometown	Occupation	Eliminated
Irena Srbinovska	31	Melbourne	Nurse	Winner
Bella Varelis	25	Sydney	Marketing Consultant	Runner-up
Bec Cvilikas	25	Sunshine Coast, Queensland	Senior Beauty Consultant	Episode 13
Izzy Sharman-Firth	29	Brisbane, Queensland	HR Advisor	Episode 13
Kaitlyn Bunyan-Hoppe	26	Gold Coast, Queensland	Personal Assistant	Episode 12
Juliette Herrera	34	Sydney, New South Wales	Stylist	Episode 11
Maddy Carver	25	Hobart, Tasmania	Teacher	Episode 11
Steph Harper	26	Geelong, Victoria	Special Needs Teacher	Episode 11
Roxi Kenny	29	Brisbane, Queensland	Mechanical Engineer	Episode 10 (Quit)
Nicole Campbell	26	Sydney, New South Wales	Professional Dancer	Episode 9
Bel Colwell	25	Walgett, New South Wales	Media Buyer	Episode 8
Areeba Emmanuel	25	Sydney, New South Wales	Home Loan Officer	Episode 7
Charley Bond	25	Brisbane, Queensland	P.E. Teacher	Episode 7
Gemma White	28	Gold Coast, Queensland	Property Manager	Episode 7
Laura Calleri	24	Perth, Western Australia	Marketing Coordinator	Episode 7
Marg Zogoulas	23	Melbourne, Victoria	Car Sales Consultant	Episode 7
Kristina Abramoff	24	Perth, Western Australia	PhD Scholar	Episode 6
Rosemary Sawtell	23	Brisbane, Queensland	Retail Manager	Episode 6
Clare Lange	26	Perth, Western Australia	Administration Assistant	Episode 5
Zoe-Clare McDonald	23	Brisbane, Queensland	Sales Manager	Episode 5
Georgie Glass	32	Hobart, Tasmania	Project Manager	Episode 3
Leilani Vakaahi	27	Forster, New South Wales	Partnerships Manager	Episode 3
Marlaina McPhillips	31	Melbourne, Victoria	Fundraising Coordinator	Episode 3
Nadine Kodsi	30	Melbourne, Victoria	Entrepreneur	Episode 1
Paige Royal	31	Melbourne, Victoria	Professional Model	Episode 1

== Call-out order ==
Note that the competition was suspended at the end of Episode 7 due to the COVID-19 pandemic, and resumed a few months later on a virtual format via video conference.

Locky's call-out order
#	Bachelorettes	Episode											
#	Bachelorettes	1	2/3	4/5	6	7	8	9	10	11	12	13	14
1	Steph	Nicole	Bella	Roxi	Irena	Bel	Izzy	Bec	Bec	Irena	Bella	Irena	Irena
2	Izzy	Steph	Kaitlyn	Nicole	Bella	Roxi	Kaitlyn	Izzy	Bella	Izzy	Izzy	Bella	Bella
3	Nicole	Bel	Juliette	Charley	Marg	Nicole	Irena	Irena	Irena	Kaitlyn	Bec	Bec; Izzy	
4	Irena	Charley	Steph	Maddy	Nicole	Steph	Steph	Steph	Izzy	Bella	Irena	Bec; Izzy	
5	Marlaina	Rosemary	Irena	Bel	Steph	Irena	Bella	Bella	Juliette	Bec	Kaitlyn		
6	Juliette	Bella	Zoe-Clare	Areeba	Bel	Izzy	Roxi	Kaitlyn	Kaitlyn	Maddy; Steph			
7	Maddy	Roxi	Laura	Irena	Kaitlyn	Maddy	Juliette	Juliette	Maddy	Maddy; Steph			
8	Areeba	Kristina	Nicole	Izzy	Roxi	Bella	Nicole	Roxi	Steph	Juliette			
9	Rosemary	Georgie	Bel	Bella	Izzy	Juliette	Maddy	Maddy	Roxi				
10	Zoe-Clare	Marlaina	Charley	Laura	Juliette	Kaitlyn	Bel	Nicole					
11	Leilani	Izzy	Roxi	Juliette	Areeba	Areeba; Charley; Gemma; Laura; Marg							
12	Clare	Irena	Izzy	Rosemary	Laura	Areeba; Charley; Gemma; Laura; Marg							
13	Georgie	Maddy	Marg	Gemma	Charley	Areeba; Charley; Gemma; Laura; Marg							
14	Bel	Laura	Maddy	Steph	Maddy	Areeba; Charley; Gemma; Laura; Marg							
15	Gemma	Gemma	Gemma	Kaitlyn	Gemma	Areeba; Charley; Gemma; Laura; Marg							
16	Marg	Marg	Areeba	Marg	Kristina; Rosemary								
17	Paige	Leilani	Rosemary	Kristina	Kristina; Rosemary								
18	Kristina	Clare	Clare	Clare; Zoe-Clare									
19	Roxi	Areeba	Kristina	Clare; Zoe-Clare									
20	Nadine	Juliette	Georgie; Leilani; Marlaina										
21	Laura	Zoe-Clare (Note: Zoe-Clare was unable to attend the rose ceremony as she was feeling unwell; therefore, she received a rose prior to the rose ceremony.)	Georgie; Leilani; Marlaina										
22	Charley	Nadine; Paige	Georgie; Leilani; Marlaina										
23	Bella	Nadine; Paige											
24	Kaitlyn												
25	Bec												

The contestant received the triple threat rose, which guarantees one Bachelorette a single date, a group date and a visit to the Bachelor Pad.
The contestant received a rose during the date.
The contestant received a rose outside of a date or the rose ceremony.
The contestant was eliminated.
The contestant was eliminated outside the rose ceremony.
The contestant was eliminated during the date.
The contestant quit the competition.
The contestant won the competition.

== Episodes ==
=== Episode 1 ===
Original airdate: 12 August 2020

Event	Description
Triple Threat Rose	Nicole
Rose ceremony	Nadine & Paige were eliminated.

=== Episode 2 ===
Original airdate: 13 August 2020

Event	Description
Single date	Bella
Group date	Irena, Rosemary, Maddy, Nicole, Roxi, Steph, Laura, Zoe-Clare, Areeba & Kaitlyn
Intruder	Kaitlyn

=== Episode 3 ===
Original airdate: 19 August 2020

Event	Description
One-on-one time	Kaitlyn
Rose ceremony	Georgie, Leilani & Marlaina were eliminated.

=== Episode 4 ===
Original airdate: 20 August 2020

Event	Description
Triple Threat Date	Nicole
Group Date	Areeba, Bel, Charley, Clare, Gemma, Izzy, Kaitlyn, Kristina, Laura, Nicole, Marg, & Roxi.
One-on-One Time	Roxi
Bach Pad Visit	Nicole

=== Episode 5 ===
Original airdate: 26 August 2020

Event	Description
Rose Ceremony	Clare & Zoe-Clare were eliminated.
Single Date	Irena

=== Episode 6 ===
Original airdate: 27 August 2020

Event	Description
Group Date	Everyone
One-on-One Time	Gemma
Rose Ceremony	Kristina & Rosemary were eliminated.

=== Episode 7 ===
Original airdate: 2 September 2020

Event	Description
Group Date	Roxi, Izzy, Bel, Maddy, Irena & Bella
Single Date	Roxi
Rose Ceremony	Areeba, Charley, Gemma, Laura & Marg were eliminated.

=== Episode 8 ===
Original airdate: 3 September 2020

Event	Description
Single Date	Izzy
Group Date	Irena, Maddy, Roxi, Kaitlyn, Bella & Juliette
Rose Ceremony	Bel was eliminated.

=== Episode 9 ===
Original airdate: 9 September 2020

Event	Description
Group Date	Bella, Steph, Nicole & Roxi
Intruder	Bec
Single Date	Bec
Rose Ceremony	Nicole was eliminated.

=== Episode 10 ===
Original airdate: 10 September 2020

Event	Description
Quit	Roxi
Single Date	Bec

=== Episode 11 ===
Original airdate: 16 September 2020

Event	Description
Group Date	Everyone
One-on-One Time	Steph
Single Date	Irena
Single Date	Izzy
Rose Ceremony	Maddy & Steph were eliminated, Juliette was eliminated outside the ceremony.

=== Episode 12 ===
Original airdate: 17 September 2020

Event	Description
Group Date	Everyone
Single Date	Bella
Rose Ceremony	Kaitlyn was eliminated.

=== Episode 13 ===
Original airdate: 23 September 2020

Event	Description
Hometown #1	Izzy
Hometown #2	Irena
Hometown #3	Bec
Hometown #4	Bella
Rose ceremony	Bec & Izzy were eliminated.

=== Episode 14 ===
Original airdate: 24 September 2020

Event	Description
Meet Locky's Family	Bella & Irena
Final Date #1	Irena
Final Date #2	Bella
Final Decision:	Irena is the winner

== Ratings ==
No.	Title	Air date	Timeslot	Overnight ratings		Consolidated ratings		Total viewers	Ref(s)
No.	Title	Air date	Timeslot	Viewers	Rank	Viewers	Rank	Total viewers	Ref(s)
1	Episode 1	12 August 2020	Wednesday 7:30 pm	681,000	8	26,000	7	707,000	
2	Episode 2	13 August 2020	Thursday 7:30 pm	604,000	8	88,000	6	692,000	
3	Episode 3	19 August 2020	Wednesday 7:30 pm	672,000	8	42,000	7	714,000	
4	Episode 4	20 August 2020	Thursday 7:30 pm	591,000	8	42,000	7	633,000	
5	Episode 5	26 August 2020	Wednesday 7:30 pm	582,000	12	36,000	10	618,000	
6	Episode 6	27 August 2020	Thursday 7:30 pm	538,000	10	55,000	8	593,000	
7	Episode 7	2 September 2020	Wednesday 7:30 pm	571,000	13	50,000	9	621,000	
8	Episode 8	3 September 2020	Thursday 7:30 pm	561,000	8	75,000	8	636,000	
9	Episode 9	9 September 2020	Wednesday 7:30 pm	549,000	13	39,000	12	588,000	
10	Episode 10	10 September 2020	Thursday 7:30 pm	570,000	9	62,000	7	632,000	
11	Episode 11	16 September 2020	Wednesday 7:30 pm	617,000	9	49,000	9	667,000	
12	Episode 12	17 September 2020	Thursday 7:30 pm	611,000	8	50,000	8	660,000	
13	Episode 13	23 September 2020	Wednesday 7:30 pm	584,000	11	37,000	11	621,000	
14	Finale Final Decision	24 September 2020	Thursday 7:30 pm Thursday 9:00 pm	694,000 879,000	7 5	34,000 50,000	8 5	728,000 929,000	
