= The Bachelor (Australian TV series) season 9 =

The Bachelor
- Season 9
- Starring: Jimmy Nicholson
- Presented by: Osher Günsberg
- No. of contestants: 23
- Winner: Holly Kingston
- Runner-up: Brooke Cleal
- No. of episodes: 16

Release
- Original network: Network 10
- Original release: 21 July – 2 September 2021

Season chronology
- ← Previous; Season 8 Next → Season 10

The ninth season of The Bachelor Australia premiered on 21 July 2021. This season features Jimmy Nicholson, a 31-year-old aeroplane pilot from Sydney, New South Wales.

== Contestants ==
The season began with 23 contestants.

Name	Age	Hometown	Occupation	Eliminated
Holly Kingston	27	Sydney, New South Wales	Marketing Manager	Winner
Brooke Cleal	27	Melbourne, Victoria	Occupational Therapist	Runner-up; Returned in Episode 12; Left Episode 8
Jacinta "Jay" Lal	31	Sydney, New South Wales	Nutritionist	Episode 15
Carlie Hodges	33	Melbourne, Victoria	Corporate Lawyer	Episode 14
Lily Price	23	Melbourne, Victoria	Crane Operator	Episode 13
Ashlee "Ash" Lawson	34	Brisbane, Queensland	Dance Teacher	Episode 13
Laura O'Loughlin	28	Adelaide, South Australia	Speech Pathologist	Episode 12
Tahnee Leeson	27	Melbourne, Victoria	Corporate Travel Manager	Episode 11
Stephanie Lynch	27	Perth, Western Australia	Business Development Manager	Episode 10
Rebekah Modernel	27	Sydney, New South Wales	Youth Support Worker	Episode 9
Sierah Swepstone	28	Melbourne, Victoria	Technical Analyst	Episode 8
Stevie Grey	29	Brisbane, Queensland	Hair Stylist	Episode 7
Tatum Hargraves	26	Gold Coast, Queensland	Company Director	Episode 7
Ashleigh Freckleton	28	Melbourne, Victoria	Speech Pathologist	Episode 6
Elena Wee	33	Sydney, New South Wales	Personal Trainer	Episode 5
Hannah Norman	26	Sydney, New South Wales	Nurse	Episode 4
Tamlyn Hoskins	25	Sydney, New South Wales	Customer Service Officer	Episode 4
Chanel Tang	34	Sydney, New South Wales	Flight Manager	Episode 3
Madison Allen	24	Melbourne, Victoria	Marketing Co-Ordinator	Episode 3
Belinda Robinson	29	Sunshine Coast, Queensland	Criminal Lawyer	Episode 2
Jacinta Boys	29	Melbourne, Victoria	Executive Recruiter	Episode 2
Annabelle O'Regan	28	Sydney, New South Wales	Medical Equipment Installer	Episode 1
Lauren Jenkins	29	Adelaide, South Australia	Office Administrator	Episode 1

== Call-out order ==
Jimmy's call-out order
#	Bachelorettes	Episode															
#	Bachelorettes	1	2	3	4	5	6 (Note: The rose ceremony was cancelled after Ashleigh was eliminated during the cocktail party. Therefore, the remaining women are listed in alphabetical order.)	7	8	9	10 (Note: The rose ceremony was cancelled after Stephanie quit during the cocktail party. Therefore, the remaining women are listed in alphabetical order.)	11 (Note: The rose ceremony took place during a group date in Glenworth Valley.)	12	13	14	15	16
1	Brooke	Jay	Brooke	Ash	Holly	Stephanie	Jay	Lily	Carlie	Laura	Holly	Carlie	Ash	Holly	Holly	Brooke	Holly
2	Carlie	Carlie	Lily	Carlie	Brooke	Tatum	Ash	Brooke	Laura (Note: The woman who received this rose in the group date was also guaranteed to be taken on the next single date.)	Tahnee	Carlie	Ash	Carlie	Jay	Brooke	Holly	Brooke
3	Jay	Lily	Stephanie	Jay	Tatum	Lily	Brooke	Tahnee	Ash	Jay	Ash	Holly	Brooke	Carlie	Jay	Jay	
4	Laura	Brooke	Holly	Stephanie	Lily	Carlie	Carlie	Rebekah	Rebekah	Ash	Jay	Laura	Lily	Brooke	Carlie		
5	Sierah	Ash	Jay	Lily	Jay	Brooke	Holly	Laura	Tahnee	Stephanie	Laura	Lily	Holly	Ash; Lily			
6	Belinda	Elena	Stevie	Ashleigh	Carlie	Holly	Laura	Jay	Stephanie	Carlie (Note: The rose ceremony was cancelled when Rebekah quit during the ceremony. Therefore, the remaining women are listed in alphabetical order.)	Lily	Jay	Jay	Ash; Lily			
7	Madison	Hannah	Ash	Rebekah	Ashleigh	Jay	Lily	Carlie	Lily	Holly	Tahnee	Tahnee	Laura				
8	Ashleigh	Rebekah	Elena	Laura	Rebekah	Ash	Rebekah	Sierah	Jay	Lily	Stephanie						
9	Tamlyn	Madison	Carlie	Brooke	Sierah	Laura	Sierah	Ash	Holly	Rebekah							
10	Rebekah	Sierah	Tatum	Holly	Tahnee	Tahnee	Stephanie	Holly	Sierah								
11	Tahnee	Stevie	Rebekah	Elena	Elena	Rebekah	Stevie	Stephanie	Brooke (Note: Brooke left the competition due to an urgent family matter.)								
12	Ash	Holly	Madison	Tatum	Stephanie	Sierah	Tahnee	Stevie									
13	Lauren	Belinda	Hannah	Hannah	Ash	Stevie	Tatum	Tatum									
14	Stevie	Tamlyn	Ashleigh	Tahnee	Stevie	Ashleigh	Ashleigh										
15	Hannah	Tatum	Tahnee	Stevie	Laura	Elena											
16	Holly	Laura	Tamlyn	Tamlyn	Hannah; Tamlyn												
17	Jacinta	Jacinta	Laura	Sierah	Hannah; Tamlyn												
18	Elena	Ashleigh	Chanel	Chanel; Madison													
19	Tatum	Chanel	Sierah	Chanel; Madison													
20	Annabelle	Tahnee	Belinda; Jacinta														
21	Chanel	Stephanie	Belinda; Jacinta														
22	Stephanie	Annabelle; Lauren															
23	Lily	Annabelle; Lauren															

The contestant received the business lounge key, which guarantees one Bachelorette uninterrupted time with Jimmy during their time in the mansion.
The contestant received a rose during the date
The contestant received a rose outside of a date or the rose ceremony.
The contestant was eliminated
The contestant was eliminated outside the rose ceremony
The contestant was eliminated during the date
The contestant quit the competition
The contestant won the competition

== Episodes ==
=== Episode 1 ===
Original airdate: 21 July 2021

Event	Description
Business Lounge key	Jay
Rose ceremony	Annabelle & Lauren were eliminated.

=== Episode 2 ===
Original airdate: 22 July 2021

Event	Description
Single date	Brooke
Group date	Stephanie, Laura, Rebekah, Tamlyn, Jacinta, Belinda, Sierah, Tahnee, Tatum & Lily
One-on-one time	Lily
Rose ceremony	Belinda & Jacinta were eliminated.

=== Episode 3 ===
Original airdate: 28 July 2021

Event	Description
Single date	Ash
Group date	Ashleigh, Carlie, Elena, Holly, Jay, Sierah, Stevie & Tahnee
One-on-one time	Carlie
Rose ceremony	Chanel & Madison were eliminated.

=== Episode 4 ===
Original airdate: 29 July 2021

Event	Description
Single Date	Holly
Group Date	Ashleigh, Brooke, Carlie, Hannah, Laura, Lily, Stephanie & Tatum
One-on-one time	Brooke
Rose ceremony	Hannah & Tamlyn were eliminated.

=== Episode 5 ===
Original airdate: 4 August 2021

Event	Description
Single Date	Stephanie
Group Date	Brooke, Carlie, Elena, Holly, Jay, Laura, Lily, Stevie, Tahnee & Tatum
One-on-one time	Tatum
Rose ceremony	Elena was eliminated.

=== Episode 6 ===
Original airdate: 5 August 2021

Event	Description
Single Date	Jay
Group Date	Rebekah, Stevie, Ashleigh, Laura & Sierah
One-on-one time	Ashleigh
Rose ceremony	Ashleigh was eliminated before the rose ceremony; the rose ceremony was cancelled.

=== Episode 7 ===
Original airdate: 11 August 2021

Event	Description
Single Date	Lily
Rose ceremony	Tatum quit before the rose ceremony; Stevie was eliminated.

=== Episode 8 ===
Original airdate: 12 August 2021

Event	Description
Leave	Brooke left the mansion due to a family matter.
Single Date	Carlie
Group Date	Everyone
One-on-one time	Laura & Sierah
Rose ceremony	Sierah was eliminated.

=== Episode 9 ===
Original airdate: 12 August 2021

Event	Description
Single Date	Laura
Group Date	Holly, Lily, Ash, Laura & Tahnee
One-on-one time	Tahnee
Rose ceremony	Rebekah quit during the rose ceremony; the remaining contestants received their roses.

=== Episode 10 ===
Original airdate: 18 August 2021

Event	Description
Single Date	Holly
Rose ceremony	Stephanie quit before the rose ceremony; the rose ceremony was cancelled.

=== Episode 11 ===
Original airdate: 18 August 2021

Event	Description
Group Date	Everyone
Single Date	Jay
Rose ceremony	Tahnee was eliminated.

=== Episode 12 ===
Original airdate: 19 August 2021

Event	Description
Group Date	Everyone
One-on-one time	Ash
Single Date	Carlie
Return	Brooke returned to the competition.
Rose ceremony	Laura was eliminated.

=== Episode 13 ===
Original airdate: 25 August 2021

Event	Description
Single Date	Brooke
Group Date	Everyone
Rose ceremony	Ash & Lily were eliminated.

=== Episode 14 ===
Original airdate: 26 August 2021

Event	Description
Hometown #1	Carlie – Mornington Peninsula, Victoria
Hometown #2	Jay – Sydney, New South Wales
Hometown #3	Holly – Sydney, New South Wales
Hometown #4	Brooke – Melbourne, Victoria
Rose ceremony	Carlie was eliminated.

=== Episode 15 ===
Original airdate: 1 September 2021

Event	Description
Single Date #1	Holly
Single Date #2	Jay
Single Date #3	Brooke
Rose ceremony	Jay was eliminated.

=== Episode 16 ===
Original airdate: 2 September 2021

Event	Description
Meet Jimmy's Family #1	Brooke
Meet Jimmy's Family #2	Holly
Final Date #1	Brooke
Final Date #2	Holly
Final decision:	Holly is the winner

== Ratings ==
No.	Title	Air date	Timeslot	Overnight ratings		Consolidated ratings		Total viewers	Ref(s)
No.	Title	Air date	Timeslot	Viewers	Rank	Viewers	Rank	Total viewers	Ref(s)
1	Episode 1	21 July 2021	Wednesday 7:30 pm	482,000	18	46,000	16	528,000	
2	Episode 2	22 July 2021	Thursday 7:30 pm	502,000	14	53,000	13	555,000	
3	Episode 3	28 July 2021	Wednesday 7:30 pm	360,000	22	24,000	>20	384,000	
4	Episode 4	29 July 2021	Thursday 7:30 pm	369,000	17	38,000	15	407,000	
5	Episode 5	4 August 2021	Wednesday 7:30 pm	366,000	21	38,000	20	404,000	
6	Episode 6	5 August 2021	Thursday 7:30 pm	375,000	20	44,000	18	418,000	
7	Episode 7	11 August 2021	Wednesday 7:30 pm	414,000	18	32,000	18	445,000	
8	Episode 8 (Note: This episode was aired along with another episode on a double episode night.)	12 August 2021	Thursday 7:30 pm	412,000	15	48,000	14	460,000	
9	Episode 9	12 August 2021	Thursday 8:40 pm	412,000	15	48,000	14	460,000	
10	Episode 10	18 August 2021	Wednesday 7:30 pm	471,000	17	31,000	18	502,000	
11	Episode 11	18 August 2021	Wednesday 8:30 pm	471,000	17	31,000	18	502,000	
12	Episode 12	19 August 2021	Thursday 7:30 pm	487,000	13	—N/a	—N/a	487,000	
13	Episode 13	25 August 2021	Wednesday 7:30 pm	445,000	17	—N/a	—N/a	445,000	
14	Episode 14	26 August 2021	Thursday 7:30 pm	470,000	13	—N/a	—N/a	470,000	
15	Episode 15	1 September 2021	Wednesday 7:30 pm	447,000	16	—N/a	—N/a	447,000	
16	Finale Final Decision	2 September 2021	Thursday 7:30 pm Thursday 8:40 pm	578,000 629,000	9 7			578,000 629,000	
