= The Bachelor (Australian TV series) season 2 =

The Bachelor
- Season 2
- Starring: Blake Garvey
- Presented by: Osher Günsberg
- No. of contestants: 30
- Winner: Sam Frost
- Runner-up: Lisa Hyde
- No. of episodes: 20

Release
- Original network: Network Ten
- Original release: 30 July – 2 October 2014

Season chronology
- ← Previous; Season 1 Next → Season 3

The second season of The Bachelor premiered on 30 July 2014. This season features Blake Garvey, a 31-year-old Perth-based real estate auctioneer, courting 30 women.

== Contestants ==
The season began with 24 contestants. In episode 8, six "intruders" were brought into the competition, bringing the total number of contestants to 30.

Name	Age	Hometown	Occupation	Eliminated
Samantha "Sam" Frost	25	Mornington Peninsula, Victoria	Financial Assistant	Winner
Lisa Hyde	27	Noosa, Queensland	Fashion Designer	Runner-up
Louise Pillidge	26	Thredbo, New South Wales	Event Manager	Episode 19
Jessica Jones	24	Central Coast, New South Wales	Accounting Student	Episode 18
Zoe O'Brien	25	Melbourne	Pharmacist	Episode 16
Laurina Fleure	30	Melbourne	Entrepreneur	Episode 15
Chantal Hrynieweski	26	Melbourne	Interior Designer	Episode 14
Lauren Birdsall	27	Sydney	Dancer	Episode 13
Mary O'Neill	27	Sydney	Acting Student	Episode 12
Rachel Miley-Smith	27	Sydney	Medical Sales Representative	Episode 12
Amber Gelinas	26	Calgary, Canada	Oil & Gas Consultant	Episode 11
Kara Bramham	24	Melbourne	Law Graduate	Episode 10
Anastasia	30	Sydney	Lawyer	Episode 9
Aley Greenblo	25	Sydney	Fashion Blogger	Episode 8
Tahnee Lee	24	Sydney	Social Media Coordinator	Episode 8
Alana Wilkie	26	Perth, Western Australia	Legal Secretary	Episode 7
Anita Cusack	30	Castlemaine, Victoria	Dog Groomer	Episode 6
Diana Dinu	28	Brisbane, Queensland	I.T. Student	Episode 6
Katrina Burgoyne	26	Newcastle, New South Wales	Musician	Episode 6
Lauren Smith	27	Adelaide, South Australia	Flight Attendant	Episode 5
Shana Leggett	26	Gold Coast, Queensland	Poker Dealer	Episode 4
Stacey-Louise	33	Traralgon, Victoria	Fitness Trainer	Episode 4
Holly Pearce	23	Sydney	Professional Netballer	Episode 4 (Quit)
Amanda Hatcher	28	Sydney	Account Manager	Episode 3
Bridgette-Rose Taylor	24	Brisbane, Queensland	Law Student	Episode 2
Tiarnar Tavita	31	Newcastle, New South Wales	Model	Episode 2
Emma Foster	31	Melbourne	Interior Designer	Episode 1
Emma Levitt	28	Perth, Western Australia	Make-Up Artist	Episode 1
Karla	31	Sydney	Nurse	Episode 1
Sam Aghan	25	Perth, Western Australia	Administrative Assistant	Episode 1

== Call-out order ==
Blake's call-out order
#	Bachelorettes	Episode																		
#	Bachelorettes	1	2	3	4	5	6	7	8 (Note: 6 contestants were added to the remaining women in this episode.)	9	10	11 (Note: The rose ceremony was cancelled due to Amber's elimination during the cocktail party. Therefore, the remaining contestants are listed in alphabetical order.)	12	13	14 (Note: There was no rose ceremony in this episode; instead, roses were handed out over the course of the masquerade cocktail party.)	15	16	18	19	20
1	Holly	Katrina	Holly	Holly	Lisa	Sam F.	Zoe	Laurina	Louise	Chantal	Zoe	Sam F.	Sam F.	Lisa	Louise	Sam F.	Louise	Lisa	Sam F.	Sam F.
2	Sam	Louise	Jessica	Anita	Alana	Amber	Louise	Sam F.	Lisa	Kara	Lauren B.	Lauren B.	Jessica	Laurina (Note: Laurina was unable to attend the rose ceremony as she was unwell in hospital; therefore, she received a rose prior to the rose ceremony.)	Jessica	Louise	Sam F.	Louise	Lisa	Lisa
3	Emma F.	Holly	Alana	Laurina	Zoe	Chantal	Chantal	Lisa	Zoe	Lisa	Louise	Chantal	Lisa	Sam F.	Lisa	Jessica	Jessica	Sam F.	Louise	
4	Amber	Jessica	Lisa	Sam F.	Chantal	Lisa	Kara	Jessica	Rachel	Zoe	Jessica	Jessica	Louise	Louise	Sam F.	Zoe	Lisa	Jessica		
5	Chantal	Zoe	Stacey-Louise	Lisa	Laurina	Zoe	Jessica	Chantal	Amber	Jessica	Mary	Laurina	Chantal	Zoe	Zoe	Lisa	Zoe			
6	Jessica	Bridgette-Rose	Zoe	Zoe	Amber	Katrina	Laurina	Louise	Sam F.	Laurina	Chantal	Lisa	Lauren B.	Jessica	Laurina	Laurina				
7	Bridgette-Rose	Diana	Lauren S.	Katrina	Sam F.	Jessica	Sam F.	Amber	Lauren B.	Sam F.	Laurina	Louise	Laurina	Chantal	Chantal					
8	Tiarnar	Laurina	Louise	Alana	Anita	Laurina	Lisa	Kara	Jessica	Lauren B.	Sam F.	Mary	Zoe	Lauren B.						
9	Kara	Stacey-Louise	Sam F.	Jessica	Kara	Louise	Amber	Zoe	Chantal	Amber	Lisa	Rachel	Mary; Rachel							
10	Lisa	Amanda	Diana	Diana	Jessica	Alana	Alana	Alana	Laurina	Rachel	Rachel	Zoe	Mary; Rachel							
11	Lauren S.	Shana	Amanda	Louise	Louise	Anita	Anita; Diana		Mary	Louise	Amber	Amber								
12	Louise	Lisa	Anita	Shana	Katrina	Diana	Anita; Diana		Anastasia	Mary	Kara									
13	Anita	Alana	Shana	Stacey-Louise	Diana	Kara	Katrina		Kara	Anastasia										
14	Amanda	Chantal	Katrina	Chantal	Lauren S.	Lauren S.			Aley; Tahnee											
15	Alana	Lauren S.	Amber	Kara	Shana; Stacey-Louise				Aley; Tahnee											
16	Zoe	Amber	Kara	Lauren S.	Shana; Stacey-Louise															
17	Shana	Kara	Chantal	Amber	Holly															
18	Karla	Tiarnar	Laurina	Amanda																
19	Emma L.	Sam F.	Bridgette-Rose; Tiarnar																	
20	Stacey-Louise	Anita	Bridgette-Rose; Tiarnar																	
21	Diana	Emma F. Emma L. Karla; Sam A.																		
22	Samantha	Emma F. Emma L. Karla; Sam A.																		
23	Katrina	Emma F. Emma L. Karla; Sam A.																		
24	Laurina	Emma F. Emma L. Karla; Sam A.																		
25	Mary (Note: This contestant was an intruder and did not join the competition until Episode 8.)																			
26	Rachel																			
27	Anastasia																			
28	Tahnee																			
29	Aley																			
30	Lauren B.																			

The contestant was in possession of the white rose – safe passage through the first two rose ceremonies.
The contestant received a first impression rose.
The contestant received a rose during a date
The contestant received a rose outside the rose ceremony.
The contestant was eliminated on a date.
The contestant was eliminated.
The contestant was eliminated outside the rose ceremony.
The contestant quit the competition.
The contestant won the competition.

== Episodes ==
=== Episode 1 ===
Original airdate: 30 July 2014

Event	Description
First impression rose	Katrina, Louise
White rose	Holly
Rose ceremony	Emma F, Emma L, Karla, and Sam A were eliminated

=== Episode 2 ===
Original airdate: 31 July 2014

Event	Description
One-on-one date	Jessica
Group date	Alana received a rose
Rose ceremony	Bridgette-Rose and Tiarnar were eliminated

=== Episode 3 ===
Original airdate: 6 August 2014

Event	Description
One-on-one date	Holly
Group date	
Rose ceremony	Amanda was eliminated

=== Episode 4 ===
Original airdate: 7 August 2014

Event	Description
One-on-one date	Lisa
Group date	Alana and Zoe received roses. Holly left the competition.
Rose ceremony	Shana and Stacey-Louise were eliminated

=== Episode 5 ===
Original airdate: 13 August 2014

Event	Description
One-on-one date	Sam F
Group date	Amber received a rose
Rose ceremony	Lauren S was eliminated

=== Episode 6 ===
Original airdate: 14 August 2014

Event	Description
Two-on-one date	Zoe and Katrina. Zoe received a rose. Katrina was eliminated
Group date	Sam, Amber, Lisa, Chantal, Louise, Diana, and Alana invited.
Rose ceremony	Anita and Diana were eliminated

=== Episode 7 ===
Original airdate: 20 August 2014

Event	Description
One-on-one date	Laurina
Group date	Alana, Amber, Jess, Lisa, Sam and Kara.
Rose ceremony	Alana was eliminated

=== Episode 8 ===
Original airdate 21 August 2014

Event	Description
One-on-one date	Louise
Group date	
Intruders	Mary, Rachel, Anastasia, Tahnee, Aley, and Lauren B introduced
Rose ceremony	Aley and Tahnee were eliminated

=== Episode 9 ===
Original airdate: 27 August 2014

Event	Description
One-on-one date	Chantal
Group date	Kara received a rose
Rose ceremony	Anastasia was eliminated

=== Episode 10 ===
Original airdate: 28 August 2014

Event	Description
One-on-one date	Zoe
Group date	
Rose ceremony	Kara was eliminated

=== Episode 11 ===
Original airdate: 3 September 2014

Event	Description
One-on-one date	Sam F, Lauren B, Laurina
Group date	None, as there were 3 one-on-one dates.
Cocktail party	Amber was eliminated during the cocktail party; therefore, there was no rose ceremony and the remaining girls all progressed to the next week.

=== Episode 12 ===
Original airdate: 4 September 2014

Event	Description
Group date	Sam F received a rose
One-on-one date	Jessica
Rose ceremony	Mary and Rachel were eliminated

=== Episode 13 ===
Original airdate: 10 September 2014

Event	Description
One-on-one date	Lisa
Group date	
Rose ceremony	Laurina had to go to hospital due to illness; therefore, she received a rose prior to the rose ceremony as she was unable to attend. Lauren B was eliminated.

=== Episode 14 ===
Original airdate: 11 September 2014

Event	Description
One-on-one date	Louise
Group date	
Cocktail party	There was no rose ceremony; instead, there was a masquerade themed cocktail party, where roses were handed out over the course of the evening. Chantal was eliminated.

=== Episode 15 ===
Original airdate: 17 September 2014

Event	Description
One-on-one date	Sam F
Group date	
Rose ceremony	Laurina was eliminated

=== Episode 16 ===
Original airdate: 18 September 2014

Event	Description
One-on-one date	Jessica, Lisa, Louise, Sam F, Zoe
Group date	None
Rose ceremony	Zoe was eliminated

=== Episode 17 ===
Original airdate: 24 September 2014

Event	Description
Women Tell All	The eliminated women returned for a tell all special, and gave their predictions of who would win out of the final 4 girls.

=== Episode 18 ===
Original airdate: 25 September 2014

Event	Description
First Hometown	Louise – Thredbo, New South Wales
Second Hometown	Sam F – Mornington Peninsula, Victoria
Third Hometown	Lisa – Noosa, Queensland
Fourth Hometown	Jessica – Central Coast, New South Wales
Rose ceremony	Jessica was eliminated

=== Episode 19 ===
Original airdate: 1 October 2014

Event	Description
First One-on-one date	Lisa
Second One-on-one date	Louise
Third One-on-one date	Sam F
Rose ceremony	Louise was eliminated

=== Episode 20 ===
Original airdate: 2 October 2014

Event	Description
First Meet Blake's family	Lisa
Second Meet Blake's family	Sam F
First Final date	Lisa
Second Final date	Sam F
Final decision:	Blake proposed to Sam F.

== Ratings ==
No.	Title	Air date	Overnight ratings		Consolidated ratings		Total viewers	Ref(s)
No.	Title	Air date	Viewers	Rank	Viewers	Rank	Total viewers	Ref(s)
1	Episode 1	30 July 2014	692,000	12	51,000	12	743,000	
2	Episode 2	31 July 2014	594,000	11	100,000	11	694,000	
3	Episode 3	6 August 2014	712,000	13	37,000	14	749,000	
4	Episode 4	7 August 2014	579,000	18	62,000	14	641,000	
5	Episode 5	13 August 2014	683,000	15	47,000	15	730,000	
6	Episode 6	14 August 2014	639,000	12	76,000	11	715,000	
7	Episode 7	20 August 2014	640,000	15	42,000	15	682,000	
8	Episode 8	21 August 2014	681,000	9	79,000	8	762,000	
9	Episode 9	27 August 2014	718,000	12	51,000	13	769,000	
10	Episode 10	28 August 2014	661,000	10	81,000	8	742,000	
11	Episode 11	3 September 2014	863,000	10	39,000	11	902,000	
12	Episode 12	4 September 2014	750,000	9	84,000	7	834,000	
13	Episode 13	10 September 2014	741,000	13	33,000	12	774,000	
14	Episode 14	11 September 2014	646,000	11	69,000	10	716,000	
15	Episode 15	17 September 2014	774,000	11	70,000	11	844,000	
16	Episode 16	18 September 2014	726,000	11	73,000	9	798,000	
17	Episode 17	24 September 2014	640,000	14	38,000	15	678,000	
18	Episode 18	25 September 2014	768,000	9	94,000	9	862,000	
19	Episode 19	1 October 2014	895,000	9	26,000	10	922,000	
20	Finale Final Decision	2 October 2014	1,026,000 1,374,000	3 1	22,000 62,000	3 1	1,048,000 1,436,000	
