= The Bachelor (Australian TV series) season 1 =

The Bachelor
- Season 1
- Starring: Tim Robards
- Presented by: Osher Günsberg
- No. of contestants: 25
- Winner: Anna Heinrich
- Runner-up: Rochelle Emmanuel-Smith
- No. of episodes: 13

Release
- Original network: Network Ten
- Original release: 8 September – 20 November 2013

Season chronology
- Next → Season 2

The Bachelor is an Australian reality dating show, adapted from the popular American Bachelor franchise. The first season of The Bachelor premiered on 8 September 2013. The season follows Tim Robards, a 30-year-old Sydney based chiropractor originally from Newcastle, as he romantically pursues a cast of 25 women, with the goal of finding his wife.

== Contestants ==
The season began with 25 contestants.

Name	Age	Hometown	Occupation	Eliminated
Anna Heinrich	26	Goulburn, New South Wales	Lawyer	Winner
Rochelle Emanuel-Smith	27	Perth, Western Australia	Model	Runner-up
Ali Oetjen	27	Adelaide, South Australia	Real Estate Agent	Episode 12
Danielle Sanby	24	Melbourne	Events Coordinator	Episode 11
Katherine Schmidhofer	33	Sydney	Child Psychologist	Episode 10
Natalie Sady	34	Melbourne	Model	Episode 9
Sarah Amey	22	Gold Coast, Queensland	Florist	Episode 9
Penny Palman	35	Melbourne	Fitness Instructor	Episode 8
Emily See-Winder	30	Sydney	Brand Strategist	Episode 7
Belle	29	Melbourne	Finance Manager	Episode 6
Ashlee Crabbe	25	Perth, Western Australia	PR Consultant	Episode 6
Alana Gray	29	Melbourne	Flight Attendant	Episode 6
Laura Clemesha	24	Sydney	Customer Relations	Episode 5
Stacey Lindall	28	Melbourne	Flight Attendant	Episode 5
Bianca Martin	31	Melbourne	Fitness Model	Episode 4
Judy Kuo	28	Sydney	Doctor	Episode 3
Sherri Mathieson	29	Gold Coast, Queensland	Make-Up Artist	Episode 3
Amy	24	Melbourne	Accountant	Episode 2
Elizabeth McMahon	34	Gold Coast, Queensland	Fashion Stylist	Episode 2
Emma Rose	25	Brisbane, Queensland	Events Director	Episode 2 (Quit)
Debra	32	Melbourne	Cosmetic Clinic Director	Episode 1
Erin	24	Brisbane, Queensland	Emergency Nurse	Episode 1
Jody Heidke	33	Gold Coast, Queensland	Pre-School Teacher	Episode 1
Joelene Booth	23	Sydney	Hair Stylist	Episode 1
Nikki Quinlan	23	Coolum Beach, Queensland	Professional Skateboarder	Episode 1

=== Future appearances ===
Ali Oetjen returned for the inaugural series of Bachelor in Paradise. Oetjen was later chosen as the bachelorette for the fourth season of The Bachelorette.

== Call-out order ==
Tim's call-out order
No.	Bachelorettes	Episodes												
No.	Bachelorettes	1	2	3	4	5	6	7	8	9	10	11	12	13
1	Laura	Judy	Sarah	Anna	Ali	Katherine	Natalie	Danielle	Anna	Rochelle	Anna	Ali	Rochelle	Anna
2	Emma	Sarah	Danielle	Penny	Penny	Rochelle	Anna	Sarah	Ali	Ali	Danielle	Anna	Anna	Rochelle
3	Sarah	Emily	Ali	Natalie	Sarah	Emily	Danielle	Rochelle	Sarah	Anna	Ali	Rochelle	Ali	
4	Danielle	Emma	Anna	Ali	Natalie	Anna	Sarah	Ali	Rochelle	Katherine	Rochelle	Danielle		
5	Ali	Danielle	Stacey	Alana	Anna	Ali	Rochelle	Anna	Danielle	Danielle	Katherine			
6	Erin	Rochelle	Rochelle	Danielle	Katherine	Penny	Katherine	Katherine	Katherine	Natalie; Sarah				
7	Katherine	Ali	Katherine	Belle	Laura	Sarah	Penny	Natalie	Natalie	Natalie; Sarah				
8	Amy	Alana	Bianca	Bianca	Belle	Danielle	Ali	Penny	Penny					
9	Alana	Anna	Belle	Laura	Alana	Natalie	Emily	Emily						
10	Penny	Belle	Laura	Rochelle	Ashlee	Alana	Alana; Ashlee; Belle							
11	Emily	Ashlee	Penny	Sarah	Emily	Ashlee	Alana; Ashlee; Belle							
12	Nikki	Katherine	Emily	Ashlee	Danielle	Belle	Alana; Ashlee; Belle							
13	Rochelle	Sherri	Natalie	Stacey	Stacey	Stacey								
14	Belle	Stacey	Sherri	Katherine	Rochelle	Laura								
15	Jody	Elizabeth	Ashlee	Emily	Bianca									
16	Debra	Natalie	Alana	Judy; Sherri										
17	Bianca	Amy	Judy	Judy; Sherri										
18	Elizabeth	Penny	Amy; Elizabeth											
19	Sherri	Bianca	Amy; Elizabeth											
20	Ashlee	Laura	Emma											
21	Natalie	Debra; Erin; Jody; Jolene; Nikki												
22	Anna	Debra; Erin; Jody; Jolene; Nikki												
23	Jolene	Debra; Erin; Jody; Jolene; Nikki												
24	Judy	Debra; Erin; Jody; Jolene; Nikki												
25	Stacey	Debra; Erin; Jody; Jolene; Nikki												

The contestant received a first impression rose.
The contestant received a rose during a date.
The contestant was eliminated on a date.
The contestant was eliminated.
The contestant quit the competition.
The contestant won the competition.

== Episodes ==
=== Episode 1 ===
Original airdate: 8 September 2013

First impression roses: With some one-on-one time in the garden at the Cocktail Party, Judy received the first rose on The Bachelor Australia, followed by Sarah, Emily and Emma.

Rose ceremony: Debra, Erin, Jody, Jolene and Nikki are eliminated.

=== Episode 2 ===
Original airdate: 9 September 2013

One-on-one date: Sarah was whisked away by private jet to go horseback riding on the beach at Byron Bay, New South Wales, for the first single date of the series. Sarah received the first rose.

Group date: Ali, Anna, Ashlee, Bianca, Danielle, Elizabeth, Emma, Katherine, Laura, Rochelle, Sherri and Stacey are invited on the group date. The group of girls go on a date with Tim to an elaborate photo shoot for a national magazine. With period costume, hair and make-up, it is a glamorous affair that has the girls looking their best. Danielle received a rose for the group date. Emma withdrew from the show before the Rose Ceremony took place.

Rose ceremony: Amy and Elizabeth are eliminated.

=== Episode 3 ===
Original airdate: 15 September 2013

One-on-one date: Tim surprised Anna with a helicopter ride over the Blue Mountains, where they had a picnic on top of the scenic skyway. Anna received the first rose.

Group date: On this week's group date Tim invites Alana, Ashlee, Danielle, Emily, Judy, Natalie, Rochelle and Sarah to go sand boarding on the dunes. Emily won the sand dune race, and her prize was riding on a camel with Tim.

Rose ceremony: Judy and Sherri are eliminated.

=== Episode 4 ===
Original airdate: 18 September 2013

One-on-one date: Ali was taken for a lap around Sydney Motorsport Park. Ali received the first rose.

Group date: Alana, Belle, Bianca, Danielle, Katherine, Laura, Natalie, Penny, Rochelle and Stacey are invited on a group date of dodgeball. Penny won a rose on the group date.

Rose ceremony: Bianca is eliminated.

=== Episode 5 ===
Original airdate: 25 September 2013

Group date: With 14 girls remaining, 5 of the contestants are taken on a Group Date. Tim chose to invite Sarah, Belle, Emily, Katherine, and Danielle to an old tall ship just on the outskirts of Sydney Harbour. Sarah had a cuddle at the wheel with Tim. After some lessons on navigation and dropping the sail, they all spotted a whale swimming close by. Later in the day, they all jumped into the sea for a swim and Tim selected Katherine for a date back at his pad and a home cooked meal of lamb roast. Katherine received a rose.

Pure fantasy date: Tim had a double date with Laura and Rochelle. The girls were taken to Darling Hotel overlooking Sydney Harbour where they got dressed up in evening gowns and awaited Tim who took them to a jewelry store wherein, they were given the run of the store and were lent a piece of their choice for the evening. Both girls chose earrings. The next venue was Curzon Hall for a romantic dinner, but the atmosphere was awkward. Towards the end of the dinner, Tim took Laura out to the rotunda in the garden in hope of getting to know her better, but there was no spark and she again, did not open up. After escorting her back and bringing Rochelle outside, Tim and Rochelle had an open-heart discussion. Tim chose to eliminate Laura. Tim then surprised Rochelle with a gift of diamond stud earrings and a rose.

Rose ceremony: Stacey is eliminated.

=== Episode 6 ===
Original airdate: 2 October 2013

Group date: The remaining 12 women were all invited on a farm day at Calmsley Hill City Farm at Abbotsbury, 40 km west of Sydney. Tim stated he wanted to see who embraced the simple life with a view into knowing a little more about his future partner. From the group, Tim took Dani to feed newborn lambs and Sarah to feed a calf. Later, a challenge was set to herd sheep into a pen and Anna won the challenge. This gave them some time apart from the group and they shared a kiss. They talked of how they missed each other in the last few weeks since their first one-on-one date. Tim told Anna he felt a connection with her. Towards the late afternoon, Tim told the girls he had a surprise set for the evening – a traditional barn dance. At nights' end, he thanked the girls for a great day and handed an envelope over, which was a one-on-one date invitation and Natalie was selected.

One-on-one date: Tim and Natalie went rock climbing in the Blue Mountains. After a tricky steep climb up, they enjoyed the vast views from atop and then Tim took Natalie into the Jenolan Caves. They shared some conversation and wine in the quiet solitude surrounded by many candles, which set a romantic mood. However, Natalie stated she was looking more for a mate long term, rather than marriage. She asked Tim to guess how old she was as she was the oldest of the bachelorettes and she wanted to know if that bothered him. He gave Natalie a rose.

Cocktail party: A small group ambush was being formed by Alana to hijack anyone that Tim took down into the garden for a one-on-one chat. He selected Ashlee, who became heavy-handed, asking what his intentions were. He was uncomfortable explaining he had to share what time he had with all of the girls. She felt she was wasting her time, waiting to go on a date with him. Alana, Belle and Danielle with a reluctant Rochelle trailing behind, broke up their conversation and cornered Tim at the pool bar, badgering him for more consistency with personal time and one on one dating in order to 'get to know each other better.'

Rose ceremony: With 11 girls and 8 roses to give out – 3 were to go home. Anna, Danielle, Sarah, Rochelle, Katherine, Penny, Ali and Emily received Roses. Belle, Ashlee and Alana were eliminated. Alana whispered to Tim that Rochelle was the girl for him. Belle said that either Rochelle or Anna was his girl. They each then kissed him goodbye.

=== Episode 7 ===
Original airdate: 9 October 2013

One-on-one date: "Indulge all your senses" invitation arrived and Danielle was Tim's one-on-one date. They were whisked away by sea plane to Berowra Waters Inn by the Hawkesbury River and indulged in a four-course meal. Dani received a rose at the end of their date, and they shared a kiss. In a cut-away scene, he said he was not sure what made her tick.

It was noted by the rest of the girls back at the house that Dani was in every group date and discussed they all agreed she was a mean girl – putting on a facade when Tim was around and was different when she was just with the other bachelorettes. Penny was hoping her turn for a one-on-one date would appear soon as she felt she was being overlooked.

Group date: While Tim and Danielle were gone, an invitation arrived for the group date. Sarah, Ali, Emily, Rochelle and Penny were chosen to meet up with Tim at the Australian Guide Dogs training centre. Each were given a puppy to 'train' and play with. First up, they were taken into the kennels to do a poop-scoop which Rochelle balked at. Tim then asked Ali to attend another chore which was to wash two puppies. Ali and Tim enjoyed a little time alone catching-up.

Tim was wondering who in the group was the most nurturing, comforting and loving with the puppies. He chose Sarah as the most natural with those qualities – her prize from the group date was an evening alone in a pocket of bushland where they lit an open fire and toasted marshmallows.

The next morning, Tim arrived at the house unannounced to surprise the girls who had just woken and were mingling in the kitchen in their PJ's and onesies. He wanted to cook them a hot breakfast, and wondered who was the most comfortable in their own skin sans make-up 'au naturel'.

Rose ceremony: With only 6 roses to give out to the remaining 7 contestants, Tim handed roses to Rochelle, Ali, Anna, Katherine and Natalie. With the final rose left, Tim excused himself momentarily then returned, asking Emily to accompany him outside wherein he explained he did not think they had a connection and that she had a wall up. He also said he did not want her to stand on the staircase alone and that it was her time to go. Thus, Emily was eliminated, and Tim returned giving Penny the final rose.

=== Episode 8 ===
Original airdate: 16 October 2013

Group date: All the girls were flown interstate from Sydney to Broome, Western Australia. From Perth, the capital of Western Australia, Broome is 2229 km (1385 miles.) They flew by private plane to the Crown Jewel of the Broome Coast, to Eco Beach, a beautiful and rugged part of the Kimberley region of northwestern Australia. They arrived to meet with Tim, who was seen from the beach, standing on a Catamaran, the Karma IV a 70' luxurious catamaran, waving at them. Natalie chose not the join the group as she had a phobia about boats. Tim, loving his outdoor sport and adventures, was keen to see who shared his love of the water. Penny grabbed an opportunity to rub Tim down with sunscreen, much to Sarah's annoyance. Sarah said she 'shuts down' on group dates and remained moody. Anna jumped in the sea and started to drift away because of the current. Tim jumped in and went for the rescue. He said it was a smart move on her behalf if it was a ploy to get a bit of one-on-one time with him.

On the speed boat back to the beach, Rochelle spotted Tim caressing Anna's hand on the rail discreetly and made comment that Anna and Tim had a strong bond and that she needs to step it up.

Natalie appeared and joined them but not all the girls were pleased to see her.

Tim announced he can only take one girl on a date, and he chose Penny. They sat by a campfire and shared wine and conversation. Penny told Tim about her divorce and how she was looking for love and she told him she was falling in love with him. Tim did not feel there was a spark between them and felt conflicted. He did not want to lead Penny on. He felt there was more of a friendship that they shared.

One-on-one date: "Catch it if you can" invitation arrived back at the resort and Anna was chosen for a one-on-one date. The next morning Tim and Anna headed off on a 4WD, driving the expanse of the isolated beach and met with a guide who was going to show them how to catch mud crabs in the mangroves. Later Tim and Anna ventured on to a picnic on the beach and shared some intimate discussions about their feelings for each other. Tim was impressed that Anna was not needy for love after she stated that at 26 years old, she has never had a boyfriend. In a cut away scene he stated he had a huge crush on Anna and loved her playful energy and that he felt he was falling for Anna, after experiencing giddiness and butterflies. Anna received a rose.

Rose ceremony: Back at the cocktail party before the Rose Ceremony was to take place, Tim took Sarah aside. She had a small conversation with Tim privately about not feeling comfortable on group dates and hence why she gets reserved. She felt uncomfortable seeing him with the other girls. Tim felt worldliness and maturity was stronger with some girls in the group. Back inside, the mood was mellow as all the girls were feeling insecure about Tim.

Tim asked Rochelle to go for a walk and told her he felt he had a connection with her. The roses were then handed out, to Ali, Sarah, Rochelle, Danielle, Katherine and Natalie. Penny was eliminated.

=== Episode 9 ===
Original airdate: 23 October 2013

As this episode opened with seven girls remaining, they are still having their week in Broome. Tim said he is in his head a lot but feels he has to now start thinking with his heart. The scene opens with the girls swimming in the sea and were called to the beach to read the new invitation, which Katherine read out loud. Rochelle stated she had not had a one-on-one date as yet. Sarah said she was hoping for a second date so they could spend more time with Tim on a one on one.

One-on-one date: Rochelle was chosen to go on the "Are You Ready to Come Out of Your Shell" date. As Tim drove Rochelle along a bumpy bush gravel road towards her surprise, they arrived to see a boat waiting for them to go pearl fishing. As they were heading for the precise spot along the river, Tim was delighting in seeing different layers emerge from Rochelle during their conversation.

Tim found a shell that he handed to Rochelle, who then pulled out a natural pearl, which was hers to keep. Tim and Rochelle headed back to the resort for champagne in the evening gardens, then went for an intimate dip in the spa. Rochelle received a Rose.

Group date: Back at Cable Beach Club Resort and Spa the girls were having a casual game of tennis when another invitation arrived. Anna read out the invitation themed 'Fly to Sea – Two from Three'. Sarah, Ali, and Dani were invited. There were gasps all round – someone is going home! The girls were flown out in a helicopter to the awaiting catamaran 'Great Escape' which had a landing pad on it. There was much excitement and screaming inside the cabin, but the girls felt trepidation as one was not coming back. They landed and greeted Tim, who was awaiting their arrival. They said it felt like they were in a James Bond film. Dani stated she was glad she was with Ali and Sarah as she did not care for their feelings and hoped she was not going home.

The date had the girls jumping from a rope that was rigged up to swing them out like a pendulum, wherein they had to let go once they were out far enough. Sarah went first and did a flop, followed by Ali and then Dani. Ali decided to have another go but once she was out the rope started to spin her wildly and she fell hard on the water, injuring her knee. After being brought on board by the crew, she was in shock, and it was decided to get the helicopter to pick her up to take her to the hospital. Tim was worried that Ali might not be able to continue in the show. He said he was upset and felt she was perfect because she was so positive even after the accident and suffering in pain.

Sarah and Dani were worried it would be one of them to go home as Tim would not send Ali home under those conditions. However, the date was abandoned, and they returned to the Resort.

Natalie said Sarah needs to grow up before she gets married and be in a relationship since she was only 22.

The girls were chatting, waiting for Tim's arrival. They were surprised at Sarah's lack of sympathy about Tim taking Ali to the hospital and staying by her side. It was unknown if Ali would be present at the Rose Ceremony. Tim said Ali being in hospital had a massive impact on him and all he could think about was Ali.

Rose ceremony: In the garden, the mood was flat, awaiting news of Ali and which two were being sent home. Tim walked in and said he felt the tension. They asked after Ali, and he said she was doing well. Suddenly, Ali appeared hobbling on crutches.

Tim only had four roses to give out to the remaining six girls. In order, Ali, Anna, Katherine and Dani received the roses. Natalie and Sarah were eliminated.

=== Episode 10 ===
Original airdate: 30 October 2013

This week's episode informs that Tim must choose which four out of the five remaining contestants he will choose to go on hometown dates with. The contestants are mingling on the balcony with their morning coffee when an invitation arrives for a one on one date and Katherine was selected for the "Journey from the Past into the Future" date. Dani speculated that it could be a visit to a museum.

One-on-one date: A limo pulled up and we see Tim and Katherine head off to a surprise date. Tim is concerned about Katherine as she is still quite reserved, but he wanted to know if the feelings and great night they previously shared back at his place, could be rekindled. They finally arrived in the dark of night to a paddock – Tim covers Katherine's eyes and walks her to a machine and tells her to pull the lever whereupon a Fun Fair amusement park lit up. After going on various rides and making fairy floss, they made their way to some hay bales to have champagne and to talk. Although a rose was tantalizingly sitting beside them, Tim elected not to give Katherine the rose as he did not want to get swept up on the date and make a rash decision. Katherine returned to the house with two stuffed animals but no rose, much to the remaining contestant's quiet delight.

Group date: The group date saw Ali, Danielle, Anna and Rochelle being taken to an Art Gallery to get their interpretation on a few pieces of art. They were then requested to go upstairs to the VIP Gallery for a surprise. Tim escorted Anna up first where they were met with a display of her childhood memorabilia. Ali, Dani then Rochelle were escorted up separately with Tim and they each talked about fond moments and memories as presented in the display.

Cocktail party: The atmosphere was intense as the girls waited for Tim to arrive. Upon his arrival he decided to take personal time out in the garden for a chat first with Ali, then Katherine and finally Rochelle – wanting to clear a few more questions he had.

Rose ceremony: Tim gave the first rose to Anna, then Danielle, Ali and finally the 4th rose to Rochelle. Katherine was eliminated.

=== Episode 11 ===
Original airdate: 6 November 2013

This week's episode – Meet the Families.

First stop was Goulburn, Anna's hometown. Anna was quite nervous as she had never brought a boyfriend home to meet her parents before. When Tim arrived in town, Anna showed him some of the township and revisited her primary school. Tim said he felt scared upon learning Anna's dad was a lawyer and being cross-examined. Anna also told Tim unfortunately her two sisters could not be there, as they both lived overseas. However, after coming home and introducing Tim to her mum, there were squeals of joy as her two sisters appeared in a wonderful surprise. After Anna's father arrived, he gave Tim a bit of a grueling session, then stated to the camera that he was impressed with Tim and found him personable and genuine. Tim said he felt very comfortable with the whole family.

Next was a visit to Perth, Western Australia – to meet Rochelle's parents. When Tim arrived, Rochelle and he went off for a game of mini-golf and a cold beer at the Waterfront. Afterwards they headed off home to meet with Rochelle's parents. During the course of dinner and the evening's conversation, Rochelle went introverted, which had Tim perplexed and it was awkward. Rochelle again stated she was too scared to open up fully to love.

Third, was a visit to the Gold Coast in sunny Queensland to visit Danielle's mum and sister. Firstly however, they met and went for a picnic and swim to the Currumbin Rock Pools . Danielle told Tim she had not really informed her mum about going on the show and that her mother only found out with short notice, that Tim was coming over for lunch to meet her. She felt quite anxious about her mother's reaction as she could be quite 'conservative'. Dani's mum and Tim had a quiet moment together in the garden and surprisingly enjoyed each other's company in that short time. This left a good impression and Dani's mum felt more relaxed than at the start of the home visit. Tim did not feel the relationship would go any deeper as Dani was still very reserved and had huge walls up.

Finally, they headed over to the Adelaide Hills, in South Australia, to meet Ali's parents and brother. Tim was excited to see Ali again and stated he loved her radiating energy. Ali took Tim to a small German township called Hahndorf where they shared one huge hotdog German style and couldn't finish it. Ali told Tim her parents had never approved of any ex-boyfriends she brought home previously for them to meet, and she was very anxious as she wanted their approval. Ali's dad and Tim went for a chat in the garden, and he asked Tim what had happened to Ali's leg when she had the accident in Broome. Later, Ali's parents had a private chat with her and asked her how she felt about Tim and what would she say if he asked for her hand in marriage. Ali's dad was happy to see his daughter so taken by Tim and thought they made a really good match.

Rose ceremony: With four girls left and only 3 roses to give out, Tim was in a dilemma about Rochelle and Danielle – the two home visits that did not go so well. Ali received the first rose followed by Anna. Tim then asked Rochelle to go outside as he still had a few questions to ask her. After escorting her back inside, he then took Danielle outside for a brief moment. The third rose went to Rochelle and Danielle was eliminated.

=== Episode 12 ===
Original airdate: 13 November 2013

Overnight dates: With the final three contestants left, Tim first met up with Ali and they went for a drive in a Porsche up to the Blue Mountains countryside and had a small picnic. Tim stated that if he was not dating all three girls at once, he could see himself falling for Ali, but it was difficult as he 'had feelings for all three girls'. That night during dinner at a cabin in the Blue Mountains, Ali declared her love for Tim again. Tim did not feel it was fair to say anything back while dating two other girls stating that he could not fully allow himself to feel that (love). After dinner, sitting by the log fire, he handed an envelope to Ali which had a note and key inside inviting them to stay the night as a couple. Tim declined saying it would not be fair on the other girls.

Next, we see Tim meeting Rochelle for a cruise on a luxury yacht 'Aqua Bay' on Sydney Harbour. He felt she still had barriers up and withheld secrets. Rochelle felt she was falling in love with Tim. Tim again stated to Rochelle, how important communication between them was to him. They headed off taking in the stunning and unbelievable Sydney Harbour views, to a secluded beach called Store Beach, for a picnic and swim. They also thought it would be fun to write a 'message in a bottle' and throw it into the sea. That evening over a platter of a variety of seafood on board the yacht, Tim said to Rochelle 'I love my time with you, and I want to keep continuing this'. When the desserts arrived, as they were lounging on the back deck, an invitation and key was on the tray offering them to stay the night as a couple, if they wished. Tim again declined to stay the night.

Finally, Tim met with Anna for their date in the botanic gardens and had a canape and champagne brunch. Tim reflected on how they banter well, and how being with Anna is easy and fun. Tim asked Anna outright 'I need to know what you are feeling and more importantly, what you see in me'. Anna stated the problems in not having boyfriends in the past was probably due to her not being open about her emotions. She said she wanted to make sure Tim was right for her as well. Tim said he needed to know that Anna really knew who he was. Anna replied she would try to be more open but did not want to fall for Tim 100 percent due to the possibility of being hurt and not end up being with him. After dinner, at the Milton Park Country House, Bowral – (125 km south of Sydney) they retired to the fireside and read the awaiting invitation letter and key to stay the night. Tim explained he did not feel comfortable staying the night with any of the girls due to respect for all the three finalists as he had strong feelings for each of them and it just did not feel right.

Prior to the Rose Ceremony, we see Tim heading into Bunda Jewellers in the city, to ask for help in getting an engagement ring designed, which would express the emotions and feelings he had whilst on this journey and wished for it to be featured in the original design.

Rose ceremony: Two roses are shown on the tray and with 3 finalists left – Ali, Anna and Rochelle. Prior to entering the Rose Ceremony, Tim was given a recording from each of them, to view, by the Host to assist Tim in his final decision. The girls awaited separately in the garden, each stating they would be devastated if they did not get a rose that night.

Rochelle received the first rose, followed by Anna and in a shock elimination, Ali was eliminated and left, broken-hearted.

In the next episode the final 2 – Anna and Rochelle – travel to Thailand where the final rose will be handed out. This trip will also see Tim's parents in Thailand wherein Tim's mother will get to meet the final two contestants.

=== Episode 13 ===
Original airdate: 20 November 2013

In the season Finale, Tim's quest for love reaches its dramatic conclusion on the stunning coast of Thailand, staying at the Pullman Phuket Arcadia resort in Phuket. Tim's family get to meet the final two girls, Anna and Rochelle.

Meet Tim's family: Rochelle was the first finalist to be introduced to Tim's family over lunch. Tim's mum had a private and probing conversation with Rochelle and thought Rochelle had not completely let her walls down. Next it was Anna's turn to be introduced to the family and they noticed how uplifting her energy was and how Tim could not stop smiling. Tim's sister commented that Tim was being 'himself when he was with Anna'. Tim's mother also had a private chat with Anna and Anna found some of the questions daunting and intense and discovered she had to admit she was in love with Tim.

Final dates: Tim has two final dates – Tim states 'it has gone from who will get the final rose to who will get all of my heart.'

Tim's first final date was with Anna – his surprise was a trip on a speed boat to an awaiting traditional Chinese Junk in the middle of Phang Nga Bay. They jumped off the Junk and swam to shore where they had some alone time. That evening, they went to a fire twirling dancing show. After the show, Anna gave Tim a gift box of cards she had drawn up, some 40, which she read out, the many and different reasons she loved him, and she finally declared that she was falling madly in love with him.

On Tim and Rochelle's final date, they met in the jungle and went for an elephant ride to the sea. That evening, they chatted privately, under the majestical starry night.

Final decision: Rochelle was first to walk down the path on the cliffside of the Resort, to hear Tim's final decision. 'There is only one girl I cannot live without' Tim declared to the camera. With Rochelle standing before him, he told Rochelle his 'heart was leading somewhere else' and Rochelle was not chosen to be the one he had fallen deeply in love with.

When Anna walked towards Tim for the final decision and greeted him, he said 'you have my heart and I have fallen deeply and madly in love with you'. He then pulled out a small gift box which was the ring he had designed which was of two bands of platinum with an infinity loop, symbolizing their journey together and moving forward. He slipped it onto Anna's middle finger of her right hand.

== Ratings ==
No.	Title	Air date	Overnight ratings		Consolidated ratings		Total viewers	Ref(s)
No.	Title	Air date	Viewers	Rank	Viewers	Rank	Total viewers	Ref(s)
1	Episode 1	8 September 2013	669,000	11	25,000	13	694,000	
2	Episode 2	9 September 2013	662,000	19	43,000	18	664,000	
3	Episode 3	15 September 2013	576,000	15	40,000	15	616,000	
4	Episode 4	18 September 2013	656,000	15	56,000	16	712,000	
5	Episode 5	25 September 2013	612,000	17	47,000	16	661,000	
6	Episode 6	2 October 2013	585,000	13	66,000	12	651,000	
7	Episode 7	9 October 2013	649,000	14	47,000	14	696,000	
8	Episode 8	16 October 2013	614,000	14	38,000	14	651,000	
9	Episode 9	23 October 2013	676,000	12	33,000	13	709,000	
10	Episode 10	30 October 2013	649,000	11	39,000	13	688,000	
11	Episode 11	6 November 2013	704,000	12	56,000	10	760,000	
12	Episode 12	13 November 2013	870,000	6	47,000	6	916,000	
13	Finale Final Decision	20 November 2013	1,016,000 1,186,000	4 1	38,000 40,000	4 1	1,054,000 1,226,000	
