= The Bachelors (Australian TV series) season 11 =

The Bachelors
- Season 11
- Starring: Ben Waddell; Luke Bateman; Wesley Senna Cortes
- Presented by: Osher Günsberg
- No. of contestants: 24
- Winners: Mckenna Lea; Ellie Rolfe
- Runners-up: Angela Valenti; Lana Chegodaev
- No. of episodes: 12

Release
- Original network: Network 10
- Original release: 3 December – 20 December 2023

Season chronology
- ← Previous; Season 10

The eleventh and final season of The Bachelor Australia, known as The Bachelors, premiered on 3 December 2023. For the second consecutive season, there are three Bachelors: Ben Waddell, a 36-year-old international model and environmentalist from Melbourne, Victoria; Luke Bateman, a 28-year-old lumberjack and former NRL player from Toowoomba, Queensland; and Wesley Senna Cortes, a 33-year-old theology student and marketing & sales manager from Brazil, living in Sydney, New South Wales.

This season is the first in the series to have been filmed in Melbourne, with production moving from the previous season's location on the Gold Coast in Queensland. Selected episodes were released 24 hours prior to broadcast, on video on demand streaming service 10Play, to reach younger audiences and increase the platform's viewership.

== Contestants ==
The season began with 24 contestants.

Name	Age	Hometown	Occupation	Bachelor	Eliminated	Place (Note: Placement reflects where they finished for their respective Bachelor.)
Mckenna Lea	25	Gold Coast, Queensland	PR Manager	Ben	Winner	1
Ellie Rolfe	29	Geraldton, Western Australia	Beauty Therapist	Luke	Winner	1
Brea Marshall	25	Tully Heads, Queensland	Mining Administrator	Wesley	Episode 12	Quit (Note: In Episode 9, Wesley choose to exclusively pursue Brea, eliminating his other connections. However, she broke up with him at the final rose ceremony.)
Angela Valenti	36	Melbourne, Victoria	Business Owner	Ben	Runner-Up	2
Lana Chegodaev	36	Sydney, New South Wales	Category Manager	Luke	Runner-Up	2
Aarthi Balakumar	29	Sydney, New South Wales	Health Projects Manager	Luke	Episode 10	3
Amelia Easey	25	Central Coast, New South Wales	Nursing Student	Ben	Episode 10	3
Maddison Lieberwirth	24	Melbourne, Victoria	Marketing Specialist	Ben	Episode 9	4
Nella Lelo	33	Sydney, New South Wales	Flight Attendant	Wesley	Episode 9	2-3
Natalie Benson	27	Melbourne, Victoria	Technical Specialist	Wesley	Episode 9	2-3
Caitlin Allan	25	Melbourne, Victoria	Jewellery Salesperson	N/A	Episode 8	11
Evangeline "Evie" Batalha	29	Adelaide, South Australia	Professional Development Specialist	N/A	Episode 8	12 (quit)
Jade Wilden	27	Brisbane, Queensland	Interior Designer	N/A	Episode 7	13 (quit)
Lisa Brehmer	23	Sydney, New South Wales	Interior Design Student	N/A	Episode 6	14-15
Tabitha von Sanden	27	Brisbane, Queensland	Registered Nurse	N/A	Episode 6	14-15
Anastasia Iliopoulos	32	Melbourne, Victoria	Property Developer	N/A	Episode 6	16 (quit)
Mel Ree	35	Darwin, Northern Territory	Indigenous Mentor	N/A	Episode 5	17
Dana Melnik	25	Sydney, New South Wales	Medical Researcher	N/A	Episode 4	18
Holly Trim	27	Sydney, New South Wales	Environmental Scientist	N/A	Episode 3	19
Angie Glavas	33	Melbourne, Victoria	Makeup Artist	N/A	Episode 2	20
Carla Di Matteo	23	Sydney, New South Wales	Hairdresser	N/A	Episode 1	21-23
Chrystal Mao	25	Melbourne, Victoria	IT Analyst	N/A	Episode 1	21-23
Kristen Sorrenson	32	Gold Coast, Queensland	Tattoo Artist	N/A	Episode 1	21-23
Yasemin Islek	32	Melbourne, Victoria	Model	N/A	Episode 1	24 (quit)

== Call-out order ==
#	Bachelorettes	Episode												
#	Bachelorettes	1	2	3	4	5	6	7	8	9	10	12		
1	Aarthi	Holly (Note: The contestant received a rose from Wesley)	Caitlin	Mckenna	Amelia	Nella	Jade	Maddison	Angela (Note: The contestant received a rose from Ben)	Brea		Ellie (Note: The contestant received a rose from Luke)	Mckenna	Brea
2	Amelia	Mckenna	Amelia; Dana; Evie; Lana; Mel; Nella; Tabitha	Tabitha	Aarthi	Lana	Ellie	Brea	Aarthi	Ellie	Mckenna	Lana	Angela	
3	Anastasia	Ellie	Amelia; Dana; Evie; Lana; Mel; Nella; Tabitha	Anastasia; Angela; Caitlin; Ellie; Lisa	Caitlin; Evie; Jade; Tabitha	Angela	Amelia	Caitlin; Evie	Natalie	Mckenna	Lana			
4	Angela	Brea	Amelia; Dana; Evie; Lana; Mel; Nella; Tabitha	Anastasia; Angela; Caitlin; Ellie; Lisa	Caitlin; Evie; Jade; Tabitha	Amelia; Anastasia; Maddison; Mckenna	Aarthi; Angela; Caitlin; Evie; Mckenna; Natalie; Nella	Caitlin; Evie	Mckenna	Lana	Ellie			
5	Angie	Aarthi	Amelia; Dana; Evie; Lana; Mel; Nella; Tabitha	Anastasia; Angela; Caitlin; Ellie; Lisa	Caitlin; Evie; Jade; Tabitha	Amelia; Anastasia; Maddison; Mckenna	Aarthi; Angela; Caitlin; Evie; Mckenna; Natalie; Nella	Lana	Brea	Angela	Angela			
6	Brea	Amelia	Amelia; Dana; Evie; Lana; Mel; Nella; Tabitha	Anastasia; Angela; Caitlin; Ellie; Lisa	Caitlin; Evie; Jade; Tabitha	Amelia; Anastasia; Maddison; Mckenna	Aarthi; Angela; Caitlin; Evie; Mckenna; Natalie; Nella	Nella	Lana	Aarthi	Aarthi; Amelia			
7	Caitlin	Jade	Amelia; Dana; Evie; Lana; Mel; Nella; Tabitha	Anastasia; Angela; Caitlin; Ellie; Lisa	Nella	Amelia; Anastasia; Maddison; Mckenna	Aarthi; Angela; Caitlin; Evie; Mckenna; Natalie; Nella	Angela	Maddison	Amelia	Aarthi; Amelia			
8	Carla	Evie	Amelia; Dana; Evie; Lana; Mel; Nella; Tabitha	Lana	Lana	Jade	Aarthi; Angela; Caitlin; Evie; Mckenna; Natalie; Nella	Aarthi	Ellie	Maddison				
9	Chrystal	Dana	Ellie	Amelia	Anastasia	Tabitha	Aarthi; Angela; Caitlin; Evie; Mckenna; Natalie; Nella	Natalie	Nella	Natalie; Nella				
10	Dana	Caitlin	Aarthi	Brea	Lisa	Evie	Aarthi; Angela; Caitlin; Evie; Mckenna; Natalie; Nella	Ellie	Amelia	Natalie; Nella				
11	Ellie	Angela	Jade	Aarthi	Mckenna	Natalie	Maddison	Amelia	Caitlin					
12	Evie	Tabitha	Angela	Mel	Ellie	Aarthi	Lana	Mckenna	Evie					
13	Holly	Angie	Mckenna	Nella	Natalie	Brea	Brea	Jade						
14	Jade	Natalie	Anastasia	Natalie	Angela	Caitlin	Lisa; Tabitha							
15	Kristen	Lana	Lisa	Evie	Mel	Lisa	Lisa; Tabitha							
16	Lana	Lisa	Brea	Jade	Maddison	Ellie	Anastasia							
17	Lisa	Maddison	Natalie	Dana	Brea	Mel								
18	Maddison	Nella	Maddison	Maddison	Dana									
19	Mckenna	Mel	Holly	Holly										
20	Mel	Anastasia	Angie											
21	Natalie	Carla; Chrystal; Kristen												
22	Nella	Carla; Chrystal; Kristen												
23	Tabitha	Carla; Chrystal; Kristen												
24	Yasemin	Yasemin												

The contestant went on a single date and moved on to the next week by default
The contestant received a rose outside of the rose ceremony
The contestant moved on to the next week by default
The contestant was eliminated
The contestant was eliminated during the date
The contestant was eliminated outside the rose ceremony
The contestant quit the competition
The contestant won the competition

== Episodes ==
=== Episode 1 ===
Original airdate: 3 December 2023

Event	Description
Self-Elimination	Yasemin
Rose ceremony	Carla, Chrystal and Kristen were eliminated.

=== Episode 2 ===
Original airdate: 4 December 2023

Event		Description
Luke's Single date		Ellie
Ben's Single date		Caitlin
Wesley's Single date		Jade
Group date	Ben's Invite	Angela, Anastasia, Natalie, Ellie
Group date	Luke's Invite	Aarthi, Mckenna, Maddison, Lisa
Group date	Wesley's Invite	Holly, Jade, Angie, Brea
Rose ceremony		Angie was eliminated.

=== Episode 3 ===
Original airdate: 5 December 2023

Event	Description
Ben's Single date	Mckenna
Luke's Single date	Tabitha
Wesley's Single date	Holly
Group date	Aarthi, Amelia, Brea, Dana, Evie, Holly, Jade, Lana, Maddison, Mel, Natalie, Nella
Rose ceremony	Holly was eliminated.

=== Episode 4 ===
Original airdate: 6 December 2023

Event	Description
Ben's Single date	Amelia
Wesley's Single date	Brea
Luke's Single date	Aarthi
Rose ceremony	Dana was eliminated.

=== Episode 5 ===
Original airdate: 10 December 2023

Event		Description
Wesley's Single date		Nella
Luke's Single date		Lana
Ben's Single date		Angela
Group date	Ben's Invite	Caitlin, Evie, Ellie
Group date	Luke's Invite	Tabitha, Mel, Aarthi
Group date	Wesley's Invite	Brea, Jade, Natalie
Group date	Self Invite	Lisa
Rose ceremony		Mel was eliminated.

=== Episode 6 ===
Original airdate: 11 December 2023

Event		Description
Wesley's Single date		Jade
Luke's Single date		Ellie
Ben's Single date		Amelia
Group date	Ben's Invite	Maddison, Anastasia
Group date	Luke's Invite	Lana, Tabitha
Group date	Wesley's Invite	Brea, Lisa
Self-Elimination		Anastasia
Surprise Date Elimination		Tabitha and Lisa were eliminated.

=== Episode 7 ===
Original airdate: 12 December 2023

Event		Description
Ben's Single date		Maddison
Wesley's Single date		Brea
Luke's Single date		Lana
Group date	Ben's Invite	Amelia, Angela, Mckenna
Group date	Luke's Invite	Aarthi, Ellie, Lana
Group date	Wesley's Invite	Jade, Nella, Natalie
Self-Elimination		Jade

=== Episode 8 ===
Original airdate: 13 December 2023

Event		Description
Ben's Single date		Angela
Luke's Single date		Aarthi
Wesley's Single date		Natalie
Group date	Ben's Invite	Amelia, Angela, Caitlin, Evie, Maddison, Mckenna
Group date	Luke's Invite	Aarthi, Ellie, Lana
Group date	Wesley's Invite	Brea, Natalie, Nella
Self-Elimination		Evie
Rose ceremony		Caitlin was eliminated.

=== Episode 9 ===
Original airdate: 17 December 2023

Event		Description
Elimination outside Rose ceremony		Natalie and Nella were eliminated.
Wesley's Single date		Brea
Luke's Single date		Ellie
Ben's Single date		Amelia
Group date	Ben's Invite	Amelia, Angela, Maddison, Mckenna
Group date	Luke's Invite	Aarthi, Ellie, Lana
Rose ceremony		Maddison was eliminated.

=== Episode 10 ===
Original airdate: 18 December 2023

Event	Description
Luke's Compatibility date	Aarthi, Ellie, Lana
Ben's Compatibility date	Mckenna, Amelia, Angela
Wesley's Compatibility date	Brea
Rose ceremony	Aarthi and Amelia were eliminated.

=== Episode 11 ===
Original airdate: 19 December 2023

The Bachelors met the in-laws and friends.

=== Episode 12 ===
Original airdate: 20 December 2023

Event	Description
Luke's Final Decision	Ellie
Ben's Final Decision	Mckenna
Wesley's Final Decision	Brea
Self-Elimination	Brea

== Ratings ==
No.	Title	Air date	Timeslot	Overnight ratings		Consolidated ratings		Total viewers	Ref(s)
No.	Title	Air date	Timeslot	Viewers	Rank	Viewers	Rank	Total viewers	Ref(s)
1	Episode 1	3 December 2023	Sunday 7:30 pm	224,000	11	25,000	13	407,000	
2	Episode 2	4 December 2023	Monday 7:30 pm	170,000	26	16,000	22	341,000	
3	Episode 3	5 December 2023	Tuesday 7:30 pm	153,000	23	23,000	22	314,000	
4	Episode 4	6 December 2023	Wednesday 7:30 pm	149,000	25	36,000	24	312,000	
5	Episode 5	10 December 2023	Sunday 7:30 pm	165,000	15	—N/a	—N/a	165,000	
6	Episode 6	11 December 2023	Monday 7:30 pm	186,000	23	—N/a	—N/a	186,000	
7	Episode 7	12 December 2023	Tuesday 7:30 pm	157,000	23	—N/a	—N/a	157,000	
8	Episode 8	13 December 2023	Wednesday 7:30 pm	146,000	22	—N/a	—N/a	146,000	
9	Episode 9	17 December 2023	Sunday 7:30 pm		—N/a	—N/a	—N/a		
10	Episode 10	18 December 2023	Monday 7:30 pm		—N/a	—N/a	—N/a		
11	Episode 11	19 December 2023	Tuesday 7:30 pm		—N/a	—N/a	—N/a		
12	Finale Final Decision	20 December 2023	Wednesday 7:30 pm		—N/a	—N/a	—N/a		
