= The Bachelor (Australian TV series) season 7 =

Season of television series

The Bachelor
- Season 7
- Starring: Matt Agnew
- Presented by: Osher Günsberg
- No. of contestants: 28
- Winner: Chelsie McLeod
- Runner-up: Abbie Chatfield
- No. of episodes: 16

Release
- Original network: Network 10
- Original release: 31 July – 19 September 2019

Season chronology
- ← Previous; Season 6 Next → Season 8

The seventh season of The Bachelor premiered on 31 July 2019. This season features Matt Agnew, a 31-year-old astrophysicist from Melbourne, Victoria, courting 28 women.

== Contestants ==
The season began with 20 contestants. In episode 2, eight "intruders" were brought into the competition, bringing the total number of contestants to 28.

| Name | Age | Hometown | Occupation | Eliminated |
|---|---|---|---|---|
| Chelsie McLeod | 28 | Melbourne, Victoria | Chemical Engineer | Winner |
| Abbie Chatfield | 23 | Brisbane, Queensland | Property Analyst | Runner-Up |
| Helena Sauzier | 25 | Perth, Western Australia | Wellness Coach | Episode 15 |
| Emma Roche | 32 | Sydney, New South Wales | Fashion Brand Manager | Episode 14 |
| Elly Miles | 24 | Newcastle, New South Wales | Nurse | Episode 13 |
| Kristen Czyszek | 25 | Brisbane, Queensland | China Researcher | Episode 12 |
| Sogand Mohtat | 30 | Sydney, New South Wales | Civil Engineer | Episode 11 |
| Mary Viturino | 31 | Melbourne, Victoria | Cook | Episode 10 |
| Nichole Wood | 25 | Gold Coast, Queensland | Café Manager | Episode 10 |
| Nikki Ferris | 24 | Sydney, New South Wales | Student | Episode 9 |
| Rachael Arahill | 23 | Sydney, New South Wales | Personal Trainer | Episode 9 |
| Cassandra Mamone | 33 | Adelaide, South Australia | Jewellery Designer | Episode 8 |
| Brianna Ferrante | 24 | Perth, Western Australia | Clerical Officer | Episode 7 |
| Monique Morley | 26 | Sydney, New South Wales | Fashion Designer | Episode 6 |
| Vakoo Kauapirura | 23 | Sydney, New South Wales | Model | Episode 6 |
| Julia Hyde | 28 | Sydney, New South Wales | Children's Entertainer | Episode 5 |
| Isabelle Davies | 29 | Gold Coast, Queensland | Pilates Instructor | Episode 4 |
| Jessica Brody | 30 | Melbourne, Victoria | Makeup Artist | Episode 3 |
| Jessie Fredriksen | 30 | Perth, Western Australia | Executive PA | Episode 3 |
| Renee Barrett | 25 | Darwin, Northern Territory | Healthcare Coordinator | Episode 3 |
| Danush Deravi | 34 | Melbourne, Victoria | Accountant | Episode 2 |
| Georgina Powell | 32 | Brisbane, Queensland | Cosmetic Nurse | Episode 2 |
| Hannah Chapman | 25 | Melbourne, Victoria | Social Media Manager | Episode 2 |
| Sam Royce | 29 | Melbourne, Victoria | Public Servant | Episode 2 |
| Tara Norman | 25 | Geelong, Victoria | Nurse | Episode 2 |
| Tash Dowell | 34 | Sydney, New South Wales | Sports Teacher | Episode 2 |
| Keely Spedding | 27 | Brisbane, Queensland | Textiles Designer | Episode 1 |
| Sophie Oddo | 25 | Melbourne, Victoria | Copywriter | Episode 1 |

== Call-out order ==
Matt's call-out order
| # | Bachelorettes | Episode | | | | | | | | | | | | | | | |
| # | Bachelorettes | 1 | 2 | 3 | 4 | 5 | 6 | 7 | 8 | 9 | 10 | 11 | 12 | 13 | 14 | 15 | 16 |
|---|---|---|---|---|---|---|---|---|---|---|---|---|---|---|---|---|---|
| 1 | Helena | Elly | Sogand | Elly | Monique | Abbie | Chelsie | Emma | Kristen | Elly | Abbie | Emma | Helena | Helena | Chelsie | Abbie | Chelsie |
| 2 | Chelsie | Chelsie | Chelsie | Nichole | Abbie | Chelsie | Emma | Kristen | Elly | Kristen | Chelsie | Helena | Chelsie | Abbie | Abbie | Chelsie | Abbie |
| 3 | Abbie | Sogand | Julia | Monique | Emma | Helena | Helena | Elly | Helena | Abbie | Elly | Abbie | Emma | Chelsie | Helena | Helena | |
| 4 | Kristen | Vakoo | Monique | Chelsie | Nikki | Kristen | Mary | Chelsie | Sogand | Emma | Kristen | Kristen | Elly | Emma | Emma | | |
| 5 | Brianna | Georgie | Helena | Abbie | Elly | Mary | Abbie | Helena | Nikki | Helena | Emma | Chelsie | Abbie | Elly | | | |
| 6 | Jessie | Hannah | Nikki | Kristen | Mary | Elly | Nichole | Abbie | Chelsie | Sogand | Sogand | Elly | Kristen | | | | |
| 7 | Isabelle | Mary | Elly | Helena | Nichole | Sogand | Brianna | Nichole | Mary | Mary | Helena | Sogand | | | | | |
| 8 | Mary | Kristen | Nichole | Vakoo | Chelsie | Emma | Rachael | Sogand | Emma | Nichole | Mary; Nichole | | | | | | |
| 9 | Hannah | Abbie | Renee | Isabelle | Cassandra | Vakoo | Elly | Rachael | Nichole | Chelsie | Mary; Nichole | | | | | | |
| 10 | Nichole | Helena | Mary | Emma | Julia | Brianna | Cassandra | Mary | Abbie | Nikki | | | | | | | |
| 11 | Vakoo | Emma | Jessica | Nikki | Sogand | Rachael | Nikki | Cassandra | Rachael | Rachael | | | | | | | |
| 12 | Emma | Nichole | Emma | Mary | Kristen | Cassandra | Kristen | Nikki | Cassandra | | | | | | | | |
| 13 | Keely | Jessie | Rachael | Julia | Rachael | Nikki | Sogand | Brianna | | | | | | | | | |
| 14 | Tash | Isabelle | Kristen | Rachael | Brianna | Nichole | Vakoo | | | | | | | | | | |
| 15 | Sophie | Tash | Brianna | Sogand | Helena | Monique | Monique | | | | | | | | | | |
| 16 | Georgie | Brianna | Isabelle | Brianna | Vakoo | Julia | | | | | | | | | | | |
| 17 | Cassandra | Cassandra | Cassandra | Cassandra | Isabelle | | | | | | | | | | | | |
| 18 | Sogand | Rachael | Jessie | Jessica; Jessie; Renee | | | | | | | | | | | | | |
| 19 | Elly | Keely; Sophie | Abbie | Jessica; Jessie; Renee | | | | | | | | | | | | | |
| 20 | Rachael | Keely; Sophie | Vakoo (Note: Vakoo was unable to attend the rose ceremony as she was unwell in hospital; therefore, she received a rose prior to the rose ceremony.) | Jessica; Jessie; Renee | | | | | | | | | | | | | |
| 21 | Julia | | Danush; Georgie; Hannah; Sam; Tara; Tash | | | | | | | | | | | | | | |
| 22 | Monique | | Danush; Georgie; Hannah; Sam; Tara; Tash | | | | | | | | | | | | | | |
| 23 | Sam | | Danush; Georgie; Hannah; Sam; Tara; Tash | | | | | | | | | | | | | | |
| 24 | Jessica | | Danush; Georgie; Hannah; Sam; Tara; Tash | | | | | | | | | | | | | | |
| 25 | Renee | | Danush; Georgie; Hannah; Sam; Tara; Tash | | | | | | | | | | | | | | |
| 26 | Tara | | Danush; Georgie; Hannah; Sam; Tara; Tash | | | | | | | | | | | | | | |
| 27 | Nikki | | | | | | | | | | | | | | | | |
| 28 | Danush | | | | | | | | | | | | | | | | |

The contestant received the golden ticket, a guaranteed date in Matt's hometown, along with a rose.
The contestant received a rose during a date.
The contestant received a rose outside of a date or the rose ceremony.
The contestant was eliminated.
The contestant was eliminated outside the rose ceremony.
The contestant was eliminated during a date.
The contestant quit the competition.
The contestant won the competition.

== Episodes ==
=== Episode 1 ===
Original airdate: 31 July 2019

| Event | Description |
|---|---|
| Golden Ticket | Elly |
| Rose ceremony | Sophie & Keely were eliminated. |

=== Episode 2 ===
Original airdate: 1 August 2019

| Event | Description |
|---|---|
| Single date | Sogand |
| Group date | Everyone |
| Intruders | Julia, Monique, Sam, Jessica, Renee, Tara, Nikki & Danush were introduced. |
| Rose ceremony | Danush, Georgie, Hannah, Sam, Tara & Tash were eliminated. |

=== Episode 3 ===
Original airdate: 7 August 2019

| Event | Description |
|---|---|
| Golden Ticket Date | Elly |
| Group Date | Monique, Renee, Nikki, Julia, Jessica, Helena, Nichole, Kristen, Jessie & Mary |
| One-on-one time | Nichole |
| Rose ceremony | Jessica, Renee & Jesse were eliminated. |

=== Episode 4 ===
Original airdate: 8 August 2019

| Event | Description |
|---|---|
| Single Date | Monique |
| Group Date | Helena, Nichole, Mary, Vakoo, Emma, Sogand, Cassandra, Rachael, Isabelle & Abbie |
| One-on-one time | Abbie |
| Rose ceremony | Isabelle was eliminated. |

=== Episode 5 ===
Original airdate: 14 August 2019

| Event | Description |
|---|---|
| Single date | Abbie; Helena |
| Group Date | Chelsie, Julia, Mary, Brianna, Sogand, Helena, Rachael & Vakoo. |
| One-on-one time | Chelsie |
| Rose ceremony | Julia was eliminated. |

=== Episode 6 ===
Original airdate: 15 August 2019

| Event | Description |
|---|---|
| Group date | Abbie, Monique, Sogand, Nikki, Brianna, Cassandra, Vakoo, Elly, Emma & Kristen |
| One-on-one time | Vakoo |
| Single Date | Chelsie |
| Rose Ceremony | Monique was eliminated outside the rose ceremony; Vakoo was eliminated. |

=== Episode 7 ===
Original airdate: 21 August 2019

| Event | Description |
|---|---|
| Single date | Emma |
| Group Date | Everyone |
| Rose ceremony | Brianna was eliminated. |

=== Episode 8 ===
Original airdate: 22 August 2019

| Event | Description |
|---|---|
| Single date | Kristen |
| Group Date | Elly, Cassandra, Sogand & Abbie |
| Rose ceremony | Cassandra was eliminated. |

=== Episode 9 ===
Original airdate: 28 August 2019

| Event | Description |
|---|---|
| Single date | Elly |
| Group Date | Nichole, Sogand, Helena, Kristen & Chelsie |
| Rose ceremony | Rachael was eliminated outside the ceremony; Nikki was eliminated. |

=== Episode 10 ===
Original airdate: 29 August 2019

| Event | Description |
|---|---|
| Group Date | Mary, Abbie, Helena, Emma & Elly |
| One-on-one time | Abbie |
| Single date | Chelsie |
| Rose ceremony | Mary & Nichole were eliminated. |

=== Episode 11 ===
Original airdate: 4 September 2019

| Event | Description |
|---|---|
| Group Date | Everyone |
| One-on-one time | Helena |
| Single date | Emma |
| Rose ceremony | Sogand was eliminated. |

=== Episode 12 ===
Original airdate: 5 September 2019

| Event | Description |
|---|---|
| Single date | Helena |
| Group Date | Everyone |
| One-on-one time | Chelsie |
| Rose ceremony | Kristen was eliminated. |

=== Episode 13 ===
Original airdate: 11 September 2019

| Event | Description |
|---|---|
| Group Date | Everyone |
| One-on-one time | Elly |
| Single date | Abbie |
| Rose ceremony | Elly was eliminated. |

=== Episode 14 ===
Original airdate: 12 September 2019

| Event | Description |
|---|---|
| Hometown #1 | Abbie - Brisbane, Queensland |
| Hometown #2 | Chelsie - Melbourne, Victoria |
| Hometown #3 | Emma - Sydney, New South Wales |
| Hometown #4 | Helena - Perth, Western Australia |
| Rose ceremony | Emma was eliminated. |

=== Episode 15 ===
Original airdate: 18 September 2019

| Event | Description |
|---|---|
| Single Date #1 | Chelsie |
| Single Date #2 | Abbie |
| Single Date #3 | Helena |
| Rose ceremony | Helena was eliminated. |

=== Episode 16 ===
Original airdate: 19 September 2019
Location: South Africa

| Event | Description |
|---|---|
| Meet Matt's Friends #1 | Abbie |
| Meet Matt's Friends #2 | Chelsie |
| Final Date #1 | Abbie |
| Final Date #2 | Chelsie |
| Final Decision: | Chelsie is the winner |

== Ratings ==
| No. | Title | Air date | Timeslot | Overnight ratings | | Consolidated ratings | | Total viewers | Ref(s) |
| No. | Title | Air date | Timeslot | Viewers | Rank | Viewers | Rank | Total viewers | Ref(s) |
|---|---|---|---|---|---|---|---|---|---|
| 1 | Episode 1 | 31 July 2019 | Wednesday 7:30pm | 828,000 | 5 | 68,000 | 5 | 896,000 | |
| 2 | Episode 2 | 1 August 2019 | Thursday 7:30pm | 693,000 | 6 | 136,000 | 3 | 829,000 | |
| 3 | Episode 3 | 7 August 2019 | Wednesday 7:30pm | 735,000 | 7 | 70,000 | 6 | 805,000 | |
| 4 | Episode 4 | 8 August 2019 | Thursday 7:30pm | 680,000 | 6 | 108,000 | 5 | 788,000 | |
| 5 | Episode 5 | 14 August 2019 | Wednesday 7:30pm | 783,000 | 5 | 59,000 | 5 | 843,000 | |
| 6 | Episode 6 | 15 August 2019 | Thursday 7:30pm | 742,000 | 5 | 105,000 | 4 | 848,000 | |
| 7 | Episode 7 | 21 August 2019 | Wednesday 7:30pm | 653,000 | 9 | 62,000 | 9 | 715,000 | |
| 8 | Episode 8 | 22 August 2019 | Thursday 7:30pm | 709,000 | 6 | 91,000 | 6 | 800,000 | |
| 9 | Episode 9 | 28 August 2019 | Wednesday 7:30pm | 744,000 | 7 | 57,000 | 7 | 806,000 | |
| 10 | Episode 10 | 29 August 2019 | Thursday 7:30pm | 720,000 | 6 | 95,000 | 6 | 815,000 | |
| 11 | Episode 11 | 4 September 2019 | Wednesday 7:30pm | 674,000 | 7 | 73,000 | 6 | 747,000 | |
| 12 | Episode 12 | 5 September 2019 | Thursday 7:30pm | 633,000 | 6 | 113,000 | 6 | 746,000 | |
| 13 | Episode 13 | 11 September 2019 | Wednesday 7:30pm | 701,000 | 7 | 51,000 | 7 | 755,000 | |
| 14 | Episode 14 | 12 September 2019 | Thursday 7:30pm | 797,000 | 7 | 93,000 | 2 | 890,000 | |
| 15 | Episode 15 | 18 September 2019 | Wednesday 7:30pm | 760,000 | 5 | 42,000 | 6 | 803,000 | |
| 16 | Finale Final Decision | 19 September 2019 | Thursday 7:30pm Thursday 9:00pm | 936,000 1,170,000 | 2 1 | 47,000 58,000 | 2 1 | 983,000 1,228,000 | |
