= Tim Robards =

Australian actor and model

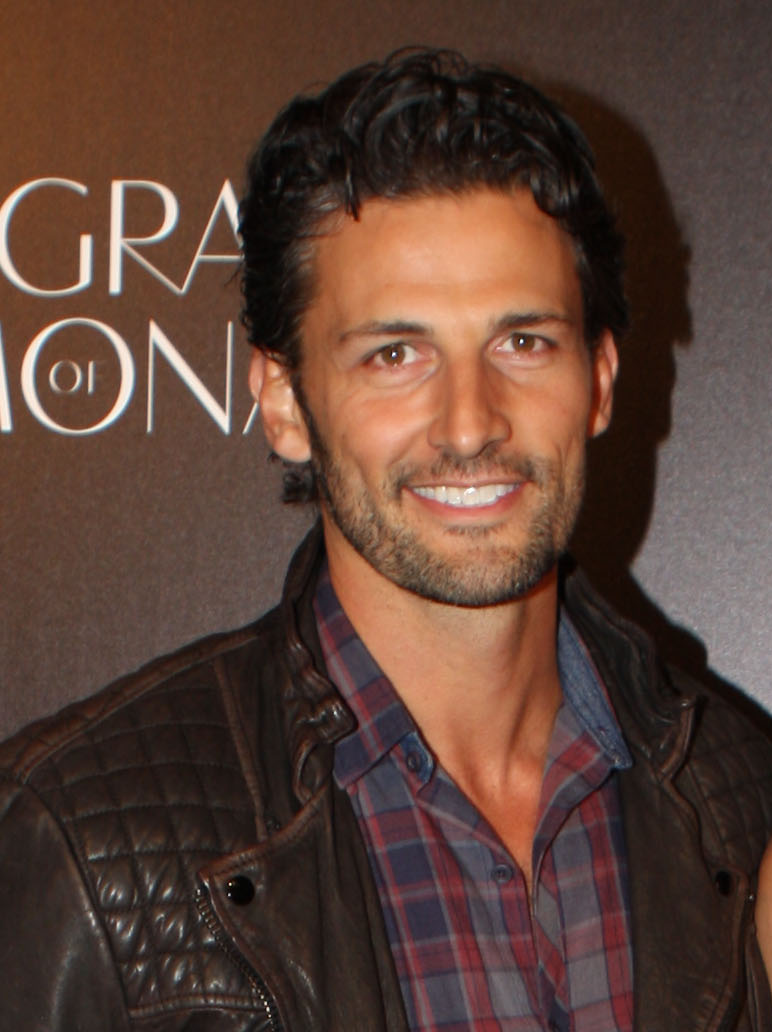
- Robards in 2014
- Born: 1 October 1982 (age 44); Newcastle, New South Wales
- Occupations: Actor; Chiropractor; Model; Television personality
- Years active: 2013–present
- Television: Neighbours
- Spouse: Anna Heinrich (m. 2018)
- Children: 2

Timothy Robards (born 1 October 1982) is an Australian actor, chiropractor, model, and television personality. Robards worked as a chiropractor for seven years, before he was cast in the first season of The Bachelor Australia. He chose Anna Heinrich in the finale. The couple later appeared on I'm a Celebrity...Get Me Out of Here! in 2015. Robards took part in the fifteenth season of Dancing with the Stars and appeared on Australian Ninja Warrior.

In 2018, Robards had a guest role in soap opera Neighbours as Pierce Greyson, which led to him joining the regular cast in 2019. Robards departed Neighbours early in 2020 to move back to Sydney as Heinrich was expecting their first child. The role of Pierce was recast to Don Hany for the character's final scenes, however, Robards later returned to the role in 2022 for a storyline filmed in Sydney. The following year, he appeared in the fourth season of SAS Australia: Who Dares Wins, and he will appear in the upcoming television drama The Good Hustle. Outside of television, Robards has worked as a model, a brand ambassador, and has developed a fitness program called The Robards Method.

== Early life and career ==
Robards was born on 1 October 1982 in Newcastle, New South Wales to Tanya and Colin Robards. He has a younger brother and sister, and attended Lambton High School. Robards planned on becoming a lawyer, however, he soon developed an interest in the health and fitness industry, and began pursuing a career in personal training after he graduated from high school. He credits his maternal grandmother for his interest in health and holistic medicine. Robards did a physics degree at University of Newcastle, before he moved to Sydney and completed a Bachelor of Medical Science at University of Wollongong in 2006, and a Masters of Chiropractic at Macquarie University in 2009. Robards then worked as a chiropractor for seven years, before being cast in The Bachelor Australia.

Robards also worked as a model. He was signed with male model agency Topless Events and Chadwick Models. He has appeared on the cover of DNA, been a brand ambassador for aussieBum, and nominated for the Cleo Bachelor of the Year.

== Media career ==
In July 2013, it was announced that Robards would be starring in Network Ten's new reality series The Bachelor Australia, where 25 women would compete for the chance to be his wife. Robards was approached by the producers to star in the series. During the finale, broadcast on 20 November 2013, Robards chose criminal lawyer Anna Heinrich over model Rochelle Emanuel-Smith. In 2015, both Robards and Heinrich joined the first season of I'm a Celebrity...Get Me Out of Here! as "intruders". Robards became the second celebrity to be voted out.

Robards then competed on the fifteenth season of Dancing with the Stars. He was partnered with professional dancer Camille Webb. When Webb was injured, Robards was paired with Giselle Peacock. They were eliminated in the third week, after finishing bottom of the table. Robards competed in the first series of Australian Ninja Warrior, but failed to advance past the heats. In 2018, he took on the course again. He fell on the penultimate obstacle and also reinjured his hamstring, which he had torn six weeks prior. However, he qualified for the second stage of the competition.

Robards developed and launched a fitness program and app called The Robards Method in 2015. In 2017, he released a health and nutrition book titled The 7:2:1 plan.

In July 2018, it was announced that Robards had joined the cast of Neighbours in his first acting role. He began playing wealthy investor Pierce Greyson in October. Executive producer Jason Herbison stated that Robards went through a long audition process for the role. Robards explained that he had made acting a priority at the beginning of 2018 and he worked with various acting coaches prior to the Neighbours audition. He later said that he would return to the show if the writers came up with another storyline for his character. He also said he would consider joining the cast full-time and relocating to Melbourne. On 14 February 2019, Robards announced that he would be rejoining the serial in a full-time capacity. In August 2020, Robards' character was recast to Don Hany for his final scenes, following Robards' decision to finish up early so he could return to Sydney to be with Heinrich, who was expecting their first child.

In his first acting role since leaving Neighbours, Robards joined Home and Away actors Sophie Dillman and Patrick O'Connor in the short film Sherbrooke Down: The Road to Cataract as Mace. The short was made to promote upcoming feature film Sherbrooke Down, which is in development. In March 2022, Robards reprised his Neighbours role for a storyline set and filmed in Sydney. Robards will appear in the upcoming drama series The Good Hustle, which stars Tammin Sursok. He also became a brand ambassador for the vitamin and supplement company Swisse's sports nutrition range Swisse Active.

In March 2023, Robards was cast on the fourth season of SAS Australia, which was filmed in the Middle East. Robards passed selection along with diver Matthew Mitcham. He appeared in an episode of the travel show Sydney Weekender in 2024. Robards makes a cameo appearance alongside his former Neighbours co-star April Rose Pengilly in the Australian horror film Drax. He also stars alongside Adrienne Bailon-Houghton in the 2026 romance-comedy film Chef's Kiss (titled From Italy with Love in Australia).

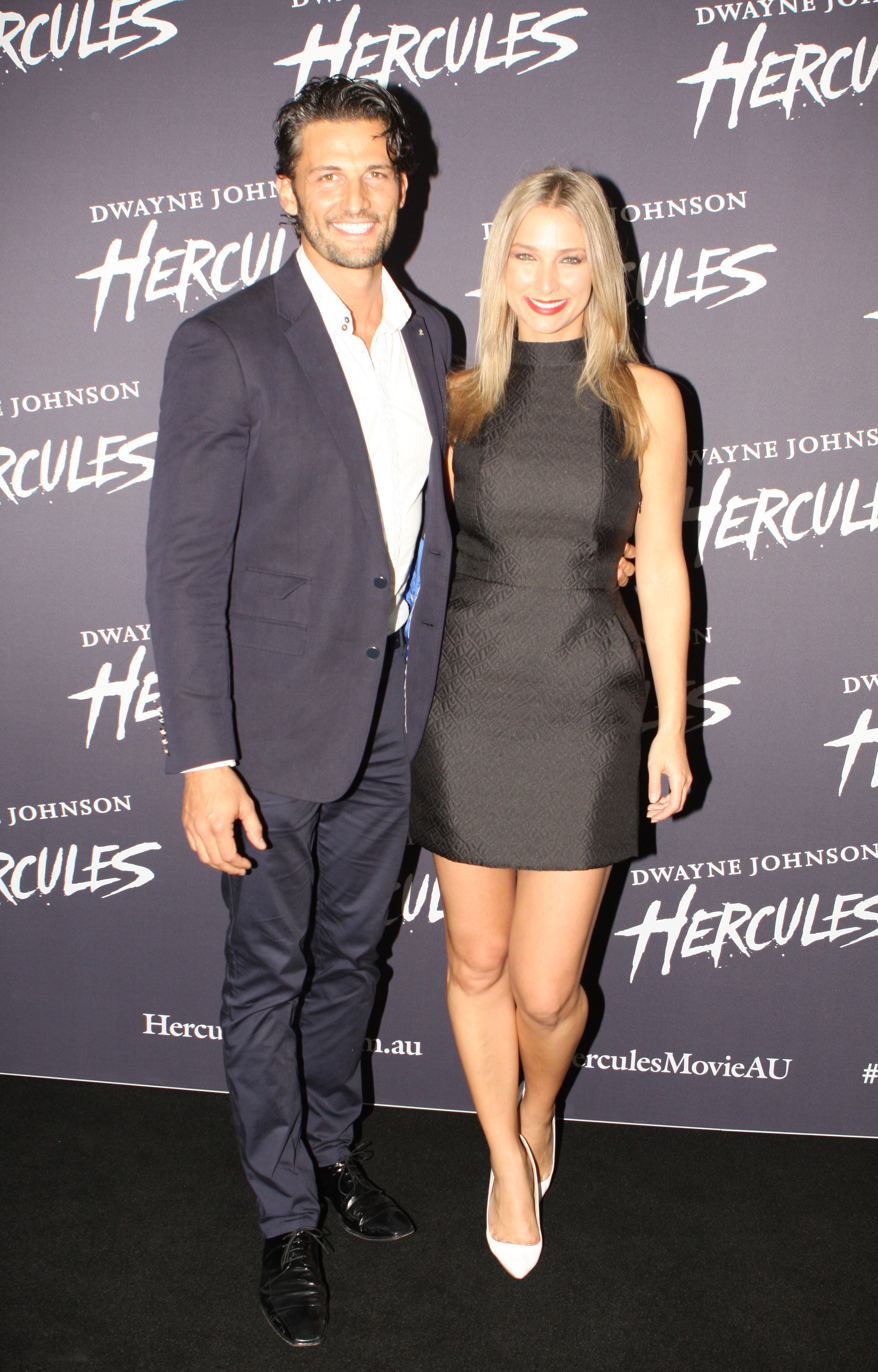
Robards with his wife, Anna Heinrich

== Personal life ==
Robards and Heinrich announced their engagement in May 2017. They were married in Apulia, southern Italy, in June 2018, making them the first couple from The Bachelor Australia franchise to marry. Heinrich appeared as one of eight contestants in the Australian television series The Real Dirty Dancing in 2019. On 2 May 2020, Robards and Heinrich announced that they were expecting their first child, and their daughter was born that November. In September 2023, Robards and Heinrich announced they were expecting their second child, and their daughter was born in March 2024.

In January 2022, Robards suffered a leg injury while playing football and had to undergo surgery to have a muscle reattached. He confirmed that he would have to use crutches and wear a leg brace for a month while he recovered.

== Filmography ==
Year	Title	Role	Notes
2013	The Bachelor Australia	Himself	The Bachelor
2015	I'm a Celebrity...Get Me Out of Here!	Himself	
2015	Dancing with the Stars	Himself	
2018	Australian Ninja Warrior	Himself	Competitor
2018–2020, 2022	Neighbours	Pierce Greyson	Regular role
2019	Chris & Julia's Sunday Night Takeaway	Himself	Guest
2020	Hughesy, We Have a Problem	Himself	Mystery Celebrity
2021	Sherbrooke Down: The Road to Cataract	Mace	Short film
2023	SAS Australia: Who Dares Wins	Himself	Contestant
2024	Sydney Weekender	Himself	
2025	Drax		
2026	Chef's Kiss	Mason	also known as From Italy with Love

== Bibliography ==
- The 7:2:1 plan (Pan Macmillan, 2017)
