= The Bachelor (Australian TV series) =

Australian reality television series

- Also known as: The Bachelor Australia
- Genre: Reality
- Created by: Mike Fleiss
- Based on: The Bachelor
- Presented by: Osher Günsberg
- Country of origin: Australia
- Original language: English
- No. of seasons: 11
- No. of episodes: 167

Production
- Production locations: Bayview, New South Wales (2013); Hunters Hill, New South Wales (2014–15); Glenorie, New South Wales (2016–17); Oxford Falls, New South Wales (2018–20); Dural, New South Wales (2021); Gold Coast, Queensland (2023); Brighton, Victoria (2023)
- Camera setup: Multi-camera
- Running time: 60–90 minutes (including commercials)
- Production companies: Shine Australia (seasons 1–3); Warner Bros. International Television Production (season 4–11)

Original release
- Network: Network 10
- Release: 8 September 2013 – 20 December 2023

Related
- The Bachelorette Australia; Bachelor in Paradise Australia

The Bachelor Australia is a reality television adaptation of the American series of the same name. The series, hosted by Osher Günsberg, first premiered on Network 10 on 8 September 2013. Its success resulted in spin-offs The Bachelorette Australia and Bachelor in Paradise Australia.

It was announced in November 2015 that unlike seasons 1–3 which were produced by Shine Australia, seasons 4–present would be produced by Warner Bros. International Television Production.

In May 2023, it was announced that season 11 would commence filming in Melbourne in July 2023 and in November 2023, it was announced that it would premiere on 3 December 2023. In May 2024, Ten announced the series was cancelled.

== Premise ==
The series focuses on a single bachelor and a pool of romantic interests. The conflicts in the series, both internal and external, stem from the elimination-style format of the show. Early in the season, the bachelor goes on large group dates with the women, with the majority of women eliminated during rose ceremonies. As the season progresses, women are also eliminated on single dates, elimination two-on-one dates and in cocktail parties. The process culminates with hometown visits to the families of the final four women, overnight dates, should they choose to accept, at exotic locations with the final three women, and interaction with the bachelor's family with the final two women. In some cases, the bachelor proposes to his final selection.

All seasons of the show have been heterosexual-centric (a male seeking a female partner), however, a bisexual edition of sister series, The Bachelorette has set a precedent that The Bachelor may include editions of the show that focus on different sexual orientations.

== Elimination process ==
=== Single Date ===
The bachelor and one woman go on a date. The bachelor is given a chance to get to know the woman on a more personal level, and the dates are usually very intimate. If the date goes well and the bachelor wishes to spend more time with the woman or get to know them further, he may present them with a rose at the date. This means that during the rose ceremony at the end of each episode, she will be safe and there will be no chance of her going home.

=== Group Date ===
The bachelor and a group of women participate in an activity. Sometimes the activity takes the form of a competition, with the winner or winners spending more time with the bachelor. The bachelor typically presents a rose to the woman who makes the best impression during the group date.

=== Rose Ceremony ===
The women who have not been eliminated stand in rows at one end of the room, and the bachelor faces them. The bachelor has a tray with roses. The bachelor takes a rose and calls a woman by name. The woman steps forward, and the bachelor asks, "Will you accept this rose?" The woman accepts, takes the rose, and makes her way to the other side of the room (where all the women who have been given a rose are required to stand.) When there is one rose remaining, host Osher Günsberg tells the bachelor, "When you're ready." After all roses are distributed, the host tells the women who did not receive a rose to "please take some time to say goodbye."

=== Hometown Visits ===
The bachelor visits the home towns and families of each of the four remaining women. At the rose ceremony, one woman is eliminated, leaving three. Another episode airs before the final rose ceremony, leaving two women.

=== The Finale ===
The two remaining women separately meet with the bachelor's family. At the end of the episode, the bachelor will reveal their true love to the woman of his choice and will often propose to her. That woman is said to be the winner of The Bachelor.

== Seasons ==
Season	Original run	Bachelor	Profile	Winner	Runner-up	Proposal	Still Together
1	8 September – 20 November 2013	Tim Robards	Age: 30; Location: Sydney, New South Wales; Profession: Chiropractor and Model	Anna Heinrich	Rochelle Emmanuel-Smith	No	Yes
1	Robards chose to enter into a relationship with Heinrich. The couple announced their engagement on 24 May 2017. On 7 June 2018, they were married in Manduria, Italy. They have two daughters together; born 12 November 2020, and born 1 March 2024.						
2	30 July – 2 October 2014	Blake Garvey	Age: 31; Location: Perth, Western Australia; Profession: Real Estate Auctioneer	Samantha "Sam" Frost	Lisa Hyde	Yes	No
2	Garvey proposed to Frost, which she accepted. On 3 October 2014, it was confirmed that Garvey had ended the relationship days before the finale aired, which had "blindsided" Frost. During an interview on The Project, Garvey declined to answer if he was involved with anyone else, however on 10 October 2014, it was reported Garvey was in a relationship with second runner-up Louise Pillidge. Garvey and Pillidge confirmed they were dating in a magazine interview on 20 October 2014. They announced their break-up on 18 April 2016, after 18 months together. Frost went on to star in the first season of The Bachelorette Australia.						
3	29 July – 17 September 2015	Sam Wood	Age: 34; Location: Melbourne, Victoria; Profession: Business Owner and Fitness Guru	Snezana Markoski	Lana Jeavons-Fellows	No	No
3	Wood chose to enter into a relationship with Markoski. On 14 December 2015, the couple announced their engagement. They married on 29 November 2018 in Byron Bay, New South Wales. They have four daughters together; Eve (Markoski's from previous relationship), Willow (born 8 October 2017), Charlie (born 23 July 2019), and Harper (born 4 May 2022).. In 2026, the couple effectively split following Sam being charged with domestic violence offences.						
4	27 July – 15 September 2016	Richie Strahan	Age: 31; Location: Perth, Western Australia; Profession: Rope Access Technician	Alexandra "Alex" Nation	Nikki Gogan	No	No
4	Strahan chose to enter into a relationship with Nation. On 7 August 2017, it was revealed that Strahan and Nation had ended their relationship. In 2019, they both appeared on the second season of Bachelor in Paradise Australia.						
5	26 July – 14 September 2017	Matty Johnson	Age: 29; Location: Sydney, New South Wales; Profession: Marketing Director	Laura Byrne	Elise Stacy	No	Yes
5	Johnson chose to enter into a relationship with Byrne. On 28 April 2019, the couple announced their engagement. On 11 November 2022, they were married in Mollymook, New South Wales. They have two daughters together; Marlie-Mae (born 20 June 2019), and Lola (born 4 February 2021).						
6	15 August – 4 October 2018	Nick Cummins	Age: 30; Location: Sydney, New South Wales; Profession: Former Professional Rugby Player	—N/a	Brittany Hockley; Sophie Tieman	No	No
6	Cummins chose Tieman and Hockley as the two finalists, however rejected both in the finale.						
7	31 July – 19 September 2019	Matt Agnew	Age: 31; Location: Melbourne, Victoria; Profession: Astrophysicist	Chelsie McLeod	Abbie Chatfield	No	No
7	Agnew chose to enter into a relationship with McLeod. On 17 November 2019, the couple announced they had split.						
8	12 August – 24 September 2020	Locky Gilbert	Age: 30; Location: Perth, Western Australia; Profession: Adventure Tour Guide	Irena Srbinovska	Bella Varelis	No	Yes
8	Gilbert chose to enter into a relationship with Srbinovska. They announced their engagement on 4 June 2022, and married on 10 March 2023. They welcomed their first child, Ava, on 23 February 2024.						
9	21 July – 2 September 2021	Jimmy Nicholson	Age: 31; Location: Sydney, New South Wales; Profession: Pilot	Holly Kingston	Brooke Cleal	No	Yes
9	Nicholson chose to enter into a relationship with Kingston. They announced their engagement on 28 August 2022, and married on 5 August 2023. They welcomed their first child, Lennox James, on 9 December 2024.						
10	9 – 29 January 2023	Felix Von Hofe	Age: 27; Location: Melbourne, Victoria; Profession: Professional NBL Player	Jessica Navin	Abigail Harley	No	No
10	9 – 29 January 2023	Von Hofe chose to enter into a relationship with Navin. Immediately after the finale aired, they released a statement confirming that they are no longer together.					
10	9 – 29 January 2023	Jed McIntosh	Age: 25; Location: Gippsland, Victoria; Profession: Musician	Alésia Delaney	Angela Ferdinands	No (Note: McIntosh proposed to Delaney, but she said no.)	No
10	9 – 29 January 2023	Delaney did not accept McIntosh's proposal, but instead agreed to enter into a relationship with him. On 14 February 2023, McIntosh confirmed that they are no longer together.					
10	9 – 29 January 2023	Thomas Malucelli	Age: 35; Location: Sydney, New South Wales; Profession: Restaurant Manager	Leah Cummings	Lauren Whybird	Yes	No
10	9 – 29 January 2023	Malucelli proposed to Cummings. Immediately after the finale aired, they released a statement confirming that they are no longer together.					
11	3 – 20 December 2023	Ben Waddell	Age: 36; Location: Melbourne, Victoria; Profession: International Model	Mckenna Lea	Angela Valenti	No	No
11	3 – 20 December 2023	Waddell chose to enter into a relationship with Lea. The day after the finale aired, the couple announced they had split.					
11	3 – 20 December 2023	Luke Bateman	Age: 28; Location: Toowoomba, Queensland; Profession: Lumberjack and Former NRL Player	Ellie Rolfe	Lana Chegodaev	No	No
11	3 – 20 December 2023	Bateman chose to enter into a relationship with Rolfe. They announced their breakup on 22 March 2024.					
11	3 – 20 December 2023	Wesley Senna Cortes	Age: 33; Location: Sydney, New South Wales; Profession: Marketing & Sales Manager and Theology Student	Brea Marshall	—N/a	No	No
11	3 – 20 December 2023	In episode 9, Senna Cortes chose to enter an exclusive relationship with Marshall and eliminated his other connections. However, she rejected him in the season finale.					

== Ratings ==
Season	Episodes	Premiere			Finale					Ref
Season	Episodes	Premiere date	Premiere ratings	Rank	Finale date	Finale ratings (Grand final)	Rank	Finale ratings (Winner announced)	Rank	Ref
1	13	8 September 2013	0.669	#11	20 November 2013	1.016	#4	1.186	#1	
2	20	30 July 2014	0.692	#12	2 October 2014	1.026	#3	1.374	#1	
3	16	29 July 2015	0.846	#6	17 September 2015	1.228	#2	1.482	#1	
4	16	27 July 2016	0.882	#5	15 September 2016	1.103	#3	1.324	#1	
5	16	26 July 2017	0.846	#5	14 September 2017	0.980	#3	1.116	#1	
6	16	15 August 2018	0.940	#4	4 October 2018	1.009	#2	1.241	#1	
7	16	31 July 2019	0.828	#5	19 September 2019	0.936	#2	1.170	#1	
8	14	12 August 2020	0.681	#8	24 September 2020	0.694	#7	0.879	#5	
9	16	21 July 2021	0.482	#18	2 September 2021	0.578	#9	0.629	#7	
10	12	9 January 2023	0.309	#15	29 January 2023	0.356	#9	0.372	#8	
11	12	3 December 2023	0.224	#11	20 December 2023	0.204	#20	0.204	#20	

== Criticism ==
The show has been subjected to allegations of sexism, in relation to its hyper-sexualised and stereotypical portrayal of women. This feminist reading of the show has prompted an ironic following, which has also manifested online through humorous columns and episode reviews.

== Spin-offs ==
On 14 November 2014, it was announced that Network Ten had commissioned the spin-off series The Bachelorette Australia. It was revealed that Network Ten were exploring launching local adaptations of some of the Bachelor spin-off programs including After the Rose, Bachelor Pad. In October 2017, Network Ten officially confirmed that a local adaptation of Bachelor in Paradise Australia will go into production and the first season premiered in 2018.

In 2025, a series spin off aired based on an elder Australian bachelor, and although the series falls under The Bachelor banner, it did not air on Network 10, instead it aired on Nine Network and was produced by Warner Bros. International Television Production Australia.

== Broadcast ==
In New Zealand, The Bachelor airs on Bravo TV under the title The Bachelor Australia.
