= The Bachelors (Australian TV series) season 10 =

The Bachelors
- Season 10
- Starring: Felix Von Hofe; Jed McIntosh; Thomas Malucelli
- Presented by: Osher Günsberg
- No. of contestants: 30
- Winners: Jessica Navin; Alésia Delaney; Leah Cummings
- Runners-up: Abigail Harley; Angela Ferdinands; Lauren Whybird
- No. of episodes: 12

Release
- Original network: Network 10
- Original release: 9 January – 29 January 2023

Season chronology
- ← Previous; Season 9 Next → Season 11

The tenth season of The Bachelor Australia, known as The Bachelors, premiered on 9 January 2023. For the first time in the franchise, this season features three Bachelors: Felix Von Hofe, a 27-year-old marketing manager, sports commentator and former professional NBL player from Melbourne, Victoria; Jed McIntosh, a 25-year-old musician from Gippsland, Victoria and multi-millionaire entrepreneur and co-founder of ACTS Music Group; and Thomas Malucelli, a 35-year-old restaurant manager from Sydney, New South Wales. The season was the first in the series to have been filmed on the Gold Coast in Queensland with the production having previously been traditionally filmed in Sydney, New South Wales.

== Contestants ==
The season began with 30 contestants, who were able to choose which bachelors they wished to court.

Name	Age	Hometown	Occupation	Bachelor	Eliminated	Place (Note: Placement reflects where they finished for their respective Bachelor.)
Jessica Navin	25	Townsville, Queensland	Retail Worker	Felix	Winner	1
Alésia Delaney	28	Sydney, New South Wales	Real Estate Agent	Jed	Winner	1
Leah Cummings	32	Adelaide, South Australia	Makeup Artist	Thomas	Winner	1
Abigail Harley	26	Sydney, New South Wales	Advisor	Felix	Runner-Up	2
Angela Ferdinands	25	Melbourne, Victoria	Model	Jed	Runner-Up	2
Lauren Whybird	28	Gold Coast, Queensland	Hairdresser	Thomas	Runner-Up	2
Krystal Thomas	26	Gold Coast, Queensland	Model	Felix	Episode 10	3
Kristen "Kiki" Joell	38	Gold Coast, Queensland	Marketing Director	Thomas	Episode 10	3
Courtney Mustac	33	Melbourne, Victoria	Designer	Jed	Episode 10	3 (quit)
Tilly Skok	24	Melbourne, Victoria	Event Coordinator	Felix	Episode 9	4
Bella Johnston	27	Sydney, New South Wales		Jed	Episode 9	4
Jasmine Absolom	24	Brisbane, Queensland	Business Development Officer	Jed (Ep 1–4); Thomas (Ep 5–9) (Note: Jasmine initially was dating Jed, but in week 4 expressed her interest in pursuing Thomas instead.)	Episode 9	4
Alicia "Lou" Bellbowen	31	Tweed Heads, New South Wales	Marketing Manager	Thomas	Episode 8	5
Eboni Burling	29	Brisbane, Queensland	Talent Acquisition Coordinator	Felix	Episode 7	5-6
Naomi Johnston	24	Sydney, New South Wales	Marketing Manager	Felix	Episode 7	5-6
Zara Jekyll	27	Sydney, New South Wales	Office Manager	Felix	Episode 6	7
Jenae Weston	29	Melbourne, Victoria	Beauty Entrepreneur	Thomas	Episode 5	6
Natasha "Tash" Zuanetti	31	Melbourne, Victoria	Property Manager	Jed	Episode 5	5 (quit)
Casey-Jo "CJ"	30	Perth, Western Australia	Wannabe Influencer	Thomas	Episode 5	7 (quit)
Marjorie Griffiths	25	Central Coast, New South Wales	Cleaning company owner	Thomas	Episode 5	8 (quit)
Jessica "Jess" Tomlinson	24	Broome, Western Australia	FIFO Worker	Jed	Episode 4	6
Yuri Nagata	21	Sydney, New South Wales	Student	Felix	Episode 4	8 (quit)
Marnie Klippelt	28	Brisbane, Queensland	Stay-At-Home Mum	Thomas	Episode 4	9
Abby Miller	21	Sydney, New South Wales	Retail Worker	Jed	Episode 3	7
Emma Lewis	25	Melbourne, Victoria	Summer Camp Worker	Felix	Episode 3	9
Aylin Sakaci	25	Brisbane, Queensland	Recruitment Consultant	Thomas	Episode 3	10
Caitlin Perry	25	Gold Coast, Queensland		Jed	Episode 2	8
Mikki Silberbach	26	Bondi, New South Wales		Felix	Episode 2	10
Jacinta Daher	30	Sydney, New South Wales		Thomas	Episode 2	11
Ella Thiele	21	Brisbane, Queensland	Marketing Coordinator	Felix	Episode 2	11 (quit)

== Call-out order ==
Felix's call-out order
#	Bachelorettes	Episode										
#	Bachelorettes	1	2	3	4	5	6	7	8	9	10	12
1	Abigail	Abigail; Eboni; Ella; Emma; Jessica; Krystal; Mikki; Naomi; Tilly; Yuri; Zara	Eboni; Emma; Krystal; Tilly; Zara	Abigail; Naomi; Yuri; Zara	Eboni; Jessica; Krystal	Jessica	Krystal	Abigail; Jessica	Abigail	Jessica	Abigail	Jessica
2	Eboni	Abigail; Eboni; Ella; Emma; Jessica; Krystal; Mikki; Naomi; Tilly; Yuri; Zara	Eboni; Emma; Krystal; Tilly; Zara	Abigail; Naomi; Yuri; Zara	Eboni; Jessica; Krystal	Abigail; Tilly	Eboni; Naomi; Tilly	Abigail; Jessica	Tilly	Abigail	Jessica	Abigail
3	Ella	Abigail; Eboni; Ella; Emma; Jessica; Krystal; Mikki; Naomi; Tilly; Yuri; Zara	Eboni; Emma; Krystal; Tilly; Zara	Abigail; Naomi; Yuri; Zara	Eboni; Jessica; Krystal	Abigail; Tilly	Eboni; Naomi; Tilly	Tilly	Jessica	Krystal	Krystal	
4	Emma	Abigail; Eboni; Ella; Emma; Jessica; Krystal; Mikki; Naomi; Tilly; Yuri; Zara	Eboni; Emma; Krystal; Tilly; Zara	Abigail; Naomi; Yuri; Zara	Abigail	Krystal	Eboni; Naomi; Tilly	Krystal	Krystal	Tilly		
5	Jessica	Abigail; Eboni; Ella; Emma; Jessica; Krystal; Mikki; Naomi; Tilly; Yuri; Zara	Eboni; Emma; Krystal; Tilly; Zara	Krystal	Tilly	Eboni	Abigail	Eboni; Naomi				
6	Krystal	Abigail; Eboni; Ella; Emma; Jessica; Krystal; Mikki; Naomi; Tilly; Yuri; Zara	Jessica	Tilly	Zara	Zara	Jessica	Eboni; Naomi				
7	Mikki	Abigail; Eboni; Ella; Emma; Jessica; Krystal; Mikki; Naomi; Tilly; Yuri; Zara	Naomi	Eboni	Naomi	Naomi	Zara					
8	Naomi	Abigail; Eboni; Ella; Emma; Jessica; Krystal; Mikki; Naomi; Tilly; Yuri; Zara	Abigail	Jessica	Yuri							
9	Tilly	Abigail; Eboni; Ella; Emma; Jessica; Krystal; Mikki; Naomi; Tilly; Yuri; Zara	Yuri	Emma								
10	Yuri	Abigail; Eboni; Ella; Emma; Jessica; Krystal; Mikki; Naomi; Tilly; Yuri; Zara	Mikki									
11	Zara	Abigail; Eboni; Ella; Emma; Jessica; Krystal; Mikki; Naomi; Tilly; Yuri; Zara	Ella									

Jed's call-out order
#	Bachelorettes	Episode										
#	Bachelorettes	1	2	3	4	5	6	7	8	9	10	12
1	Abby	Abby; Alésia; Angela; Bella; Caitlin; Courtney; Jasmine; Jess; Tash	Abby; Alésia; Courtney; Jess	Tash	Alésia; Bella	Angela	Bella	Angela	Courtney	Alésia	Alésia; Angela	Alésia
2	Alésia	Abby; Alésia; Angela; Bella; Caitlin; Courtney; Jasmine; Jess; Tash	Abby; Alésia; Courtney; Jess	Angela; Jasmine	Alésia; Bella	Alésia	Courtney	Bella	Alésia	Angela	Alésia; Angela	Angela
3	Angela	Abby; Alésia; Angela; Bella; Caitlin; Courtney; Jasmine; Jess; Tash	Abby; Alésia; Courtney; Jess	Angela; Jasmine	Angela	Courtney	Alésia	Alésia	Angela	Courtney	Courtney	
4	Bella	Abby; Alésia; Angela; Bella; Caitlin; Courtney; Jasmine; Jess; Tash	Abby; Alésia; Courtney; Jess	Alésia	Tash	Bella	Angela	Courtney	Bella	Bella		
5	Caitlin	Abby; Alésia; Angela; Bella; Caitlin; Courtney; Jasmine; Jess; Tash	Bella	Jess	Jasmine	Tash						
6	Courtney	Abby; Alésia; Angela; Bella; Caitlin; Courtney; Jasmine; Jess; Tash	Tash	Courtney	Courtney							
7	Jasmine	Abby; Alésia; Angela; Bella; Caitlin; Courtney; Jasmine; Jess; Tash	Angela	Bella	Jess							
8	Jess	Abby; Alésia; Angela; Bella; Caitlin; Courtney; Jasmine; Jess; Tash	Jasmine	Abby								
9	Tash	Abby; Alésia; Angela; Bella; Caitlin; Courtney; Jasmine; Jess; Tash	Caitlin									

Thomas' call-out order
#	Bachelorettes	Episode										
#	Bachelorettes	1	2	3	4	5	6	7	8	9	10	12
1	Aylin	Aylin; CJ; Jacinta; Jenae; Kiki; Lauren; Leah; Lou; Marjorie; Marnie	Aylin; CJ; Jenae; Lauren; Lou	Leah	CJ; Jenae; Lou	Kiki	Jasmine	Lauren	Leah	Lauren	Leah	Leah
2	CJ	Aylin; CJ; Jacinta; Jenae; Kiki; Lauren; Leah; Lou; Marjorie; Marnie	Aylin; CJ; Jenae; Lauren; Lou	Kiki; Marjorie; Marnie	CJ; Jenae; Lou	Leah	Lauren	Leah	Lauren	Leah	Lauren	Lauren
3	Jacinta	Aylin; CJ; Jacinta; Jenae; Kiki; Lauren; Leah; Lou; Marjorie; Marnie	Aylin; CJ; Jenae; Lauren; Lou	Kiki; Marjorie; Marnie	CJ; Jenae; Lou	Lou	Lou	Kiki	Kiki	Kiki	Kiki	
4	Jenae	Aylin; CJ; Jacinta; Jenae; Kiki; Lauren; Leah; Lou; Marjorie; Marnie	Aylin; CJ; Jenae; Lauren; Lou	Kiki; Marjorie; Marnie	Lauren	Lauren	Leah	Lou	Jasmine	Jasmine		
5	Kiki	Aylin; CJ; Jacinta; Jenae; Kiki; Lauren; Leah; Lou; Marjorie; Marnie	Aylin; CJ; Jenae; Lauren; Lou	Lou	Kiki	Jasmine	Kiki	Jasmine	Lou			
6	Lauren	Aylin; CJ; Jacinta; Jenae; Kiki; Lauren; Leah; Lou; Marjorie; Marnie	Kiki	Lauren	Leah	Jenae						
7	Leah	Aylin; CJ; Jacinta; Jenae; Kiki; Lauren; Leah; Lou; Marjorie; Marnie	Marjorie	Jenae	Marjorie	CJ; Marjorie						
8	Lou	Aylin; CJ; Jacinta; Jenae; Kiki; Lauren; Leah; Lou; Marjorie; Marnie	Marnie	CJ	Jasmine	CJ; Marjorie						
9	Marjorie	Aylin; CJ; Jacinta; Jenae; Kiki; Lauren; Leah; Lou; Marjorie; Marnie	Leah	Aylin	Marnie							
10	Marnie	Aylin; CJ; Jacinta; Jenae; Kiki; Lauren; Leah; Lou; Marjorie; Marnie	Jacinta									
11	Jasmine											

The contestant received a first impression rose.
The contestant went on a single date and moved on to the next week by default
The contestant received a rose outside of a date or the rose ceremony.
The contestant moved on to the next week by default
The contestant was eliminated
The contestant was eliminated during the date
The contestant was eliminated outside the rose ceremony
The contestant rejected a rose, but moved to pursue with other bachelor.
The contestant quit the competition
The contestant won the competition

== Episodes ==
=== Episode 1 ===
Original airdate: 9 January 2023

Event	Description
Felix's Roses	Abigail, Eboni, Ella, Emma, Jessica, Krystal, Mikki, Naomi, Tilly, Yuri, Zara
Jed's Roses	Abby, Alésia, Angela, Bella, Caitlin, Courtney, Jasmine, Jess, Tash
Thomas' Roses	Aylin, CJ, Jacinta, Jenae, Kiki, Lauren, Leah, Lou, Marjorie, Marnie

Note: The Bachelors had 10 roses each, but Jed gave one of his roses to Felix.

=== Episode 2 ===
Original airdate: 10 January 2023

Event	Description
Leave	Ella quit during the first night.
Felix's Group date	Naomi, Abigail, Yuri, Mikki, Jessica
Jed's Group date	Angela, Jasmine, Bella, Caitlin, Tash
Thomas' Group date	Kiki, Jacinta, Marjorie, Marnie, Leah
Rose ceremony	Mikki, Caitlin and Jacinta were eliminated.

=== Episode 3 ===
Original airdate: 11 January 2023

Event	Description
Jed's Single date	Tash
Thomas' Single date	Leah
Felix's Group date	Eboni, Emma, Jessica, Krystal, Tilly
Jed's Group date	Abby, Alésia, Bella, Courtney, Jess
Thomas' Group date	Aylin, CJ, Jenae, Lauren, Lou
Rose ceremony	Aylin, Emma and Abby were eliminated.

=== Episode 4 ===
Original airdate: 15 January 2023

Event	Description
Felix's Group date	Abigail, Tilly, Zara, Naomi, Yuri
Jed's Group date	Angela, Tash, Jasmine, Courtney, Jess
Thomas' Group date	Lauren, Kiki, Leah, Marjorie, Marnie
Rose ceremony	Yuri quit before the rose ceremony, Jess and Marnie were eliminated.

=== Episode 5 ===
Original airdate: 16 January 2023

Event	Description
Leave	CJ, Majorie and Tash quit.
Felix's Single date	Jessica
Jed's Single date	Alésia
Thomas' Single date	Kiki
Felix's Group date	Eboni, Krystal, Naomi, Zara
Jed's Group date	Alésia, Angela, Bella, Courtney
Thomas' Group date	Jasmine, Jenae, Lauren, Lou
Rose ceremony	Jenae was eliminated.

=== Episode 6 ===
Original airdate: 17 January 2023

Event	Description
Thomas` Group date	Kiki, Lou, Leah
Jed's Group date	Alésia, Courtney, Angela
Felix's Group date	Abigail, Zara, Jessica
Felix's Single date	Krystal
Thomas' Single date	Jasmine
Rose ceremony	Zara was eliminated.

Note: The girls on the group date where joined by their loved ones.

=== Episode 7 ===
Original airdate: 18 January 2023

Event	Description
Felix's Single date	Tilly
Jed's Single date	Angela
Thomas' Single date	Lauren
Felix's Group date	Eboni, Krystal, Naomi, Tilly
Jed's Group date	Alésia, Bella, Courtney
Thomas' Group date	Jasmine, Kiki, Lou
Rose ceremony	Eboni and Naomi were eliminated.
Return	Tash returned, but Jed rejected her.

=== Episode 8 ===
Original airdate: 22 January 2023

Event	Description
Felix's Single date	Abigial
Jed's Single date	Courtney
Thomas' Single date	Leah
Felix's Group date	Krystal, Tilly, Jessica
Jed's Group date	Alésia, Angela, Bella
Thomas' Group date	Jasmine, Lou, Kiki, Lauren
Rose ceremony	Lou was eliminated.

=== Episode 9 ===
Original airdate: 23 January 2023

Event	Description
Felix's Single date	Tilly
Jed's Single date	Alésia
Thomas' Single date	Lauren
Felix's Dinner date	Abigail, Jessica, Krystal, Tilly
Jed's Dinner date	Alésia, Angela, Bella, Courtney
Thomas' Dinner date	Jasmine, Kiki, Lauren, Leah
Rose ceremony	Tilly, Bella and Jasmine were eliminated.

=== Episode 10 ===
Original airdate: 24 January 2023

Event	Description
Felix's Single date	Jessica
Jed's Single date	Angela
Thomas' Single date	Kiki
Felix's Group date	Abigail, Jessica, Krystal
Jed's Group date	Alésia, Angela, Courtney
Thomas' Group date	Kiki, Lauren, Leah
Rose ceremony	Courtney quit before the rose ceremony, Krystal and Kiki were eliminated.

=== Episode 11 ===
Original airdate: 25 January 2023

The Bachelors met the in-laws and friends.

=== Episode 12 ===
Original airdate: 29 January 2023

Event	Description
Felix's Final Decision	Jessica
Jed's Final Decision	Alésia
Thomas' Final Decision	Leah

== Ratings ==
No.	Title	Air date	Timeslot	Overnight ratings		Consolidated ratings		Total viewers	Ref(s)
No.	Title	Air date	Timeslot	Viewers	Rank	Viewers	Rank	Total viewers	Ref(s)
1	Episode 1	9 January 2023	Monday 7:30 pm	309,000	15	58,000	12	367,000	
2	Episode 2	10 January 2023	Tuesday 7:30 pm	273,000	15	50,000	10	323,000	
3	Episode 3	11 January 2023	Wednesday 7:30 pm	281,000	12	—N/a	—N/a	281,000	
4	Episode 4	15 January 2023	Sunday 7:30 pm	252,000	8	45,000	8	297,000	
5	Episode 5	16 January 2023	Monday 7:30 pm	312,000	11	47,000	10	359,000	
6	Episode 6	17 January 2023	Tuesday 7:30 pm	288,000	13	44,000	10	332,000	
7	Episode 7	18 January 2023	Wednesday 7:30 pm	274,000	12	45,000	10	319,000	
8	Episode 8	22 January 2023	Sunday 7:30 pm	275,000	11	40,000	8	315,000	
9	Episode 9	23 January 2023	Monday 7:30 pm	277,000	14	49,000	12	326,000	
10	Episode 10	24 January 2023	Tuesday 7:30 pm	299,000	12	42,000	11	341,000	
11	Episode 11	25 January 2023	Wednesday 7:30 pm	280,000	11	—N/a	—N/a	280,000	
12	Finale Final Decision	29 January 2023	Sunday 7:30 pm Sunday 8:40 pm	356,000 372,000	9 8	22,000 24,000	9 8	378,000 396,000	
