= The Challenge: Australia =

Australian reality competition series

- Genre: Reality competition
- Created by: Mary-Ellis Bunim; Jonathan Murray
- Based on: The Challenge
- Presented by: Brihony Dawson
- Country of origin: Australia
- Original language: English
- No. of seasons: 1
- No. of episodes: 10

Production
- Executive producer: Stephen Tate
- Production locations: Buenos Aires & Pilar Argentina
- Camera setup: Multi-camera
- Running time: 45–50 minutes
- Production company: Bunim/Murray Productions

Original release
- Network: Network 10
- Release: 14 November – 13 December 2022

Related
- The Challenge: World Championship

The Challenge: Australia is the Australian adaptation of the American reality competition series The Challenge. The first season featured twenty-two Australian reality television contestants and celebrities competing against one another in various challenges to avoid elimination.

The series, hosted by TV presenter and sports commentator Brihony Dawson, premiered on Network 10 on 14 November 2022. Due to low viewership, the series was moved to 10 Shake from episode 7.

== Background ==
The Challenge: Australia features cast members from different reality shows, including: The Bachelor Australia, The Bachelorette Australia, Married at First Sight Australia, Love Island Australia, Big Brother Australia, Australian Survivor, MasterChef Australia, Australian Ninja Warrior, Australia's Got Talent and I'm a Celebrity...Get Me Out of Here! Australia as well as various celebrities.

In February 2022, a new series of international seasons of The Challenge was announced to air later in the year. The series comprises four new editions of The Challenge, which includes The Challenge: USA, The Challenge: Australia, The Challenge Argentina: El Desafío and The Challenge UK. These local renditions were followed by a fifth series in which winners and select contestants of each series will compete again in Cape Town, South Africa on another season titled The Challenge: World Championship, which aired on Paramount+.

In addition to the opportunity to represent the Australian series in World Championship, cast members also competed to win an A$200,000 prize pool and the Australian inaugural title of "Challenge Champion".

== Format ==
The Challenge: Australia consists of a main challenge, a winners' selection and an elimination round.

- Daily Challenge: Players compete in the main challenge in male/female teams of two. The last-place team is automatically sent to the elimination round. The winners earn the power to select a second team to compete in the elimination against the last-place team.
- Eliminations ("The Arena"): The last-place team from the daily challenge compete in an elimination round against the team selected by the winners of the daily challenge. The winners remain in the game while the losers are eliminated.

Twists

- The Algorithm: Introduced after the first elimination, an algorithm assigns players a new partner of the opposite gender for the next game cycle. Players must be assigned a new partner they haven't been paired with, or cannot have the same partner twice in a row if they have already partnered with each eligible remaining player. In Episode 5, as part of a twist (see below), the winners of the daily challenge were appointed as "the Algorithm" and chose the teams for the next cycle of the game, without the need to consider previous pairings. The Algorithm also selected teams during the Final Challenge.
- Halfway Point twist: To mark the halfway point of the season, a twist was announced after the "Ball & Chain" elimination in Episode 5. Firstly, the losers of the elimination were not eliminated. Secondly, the winners of the same elimination were awarded the option to remain as a team for the next cycle of the game or separate. Finally, the reigning daily challenge winners were appointed as the "Algorithm" and awarded the power to decide the teams for the next cycle of the game.

== Contestants ==
List of male contestants, with original series and final placings shown
| Male contestants | Original series/Known for | Finish |
|---|---|---|
| Troy Cullen | Australian Ninja Warrior 4 | Winner |
| Ciarran Stott | The Bachelorette Australia 5 | Runner-up |
| Conor Curran | Masterchef Australia 13 | Third place |
| Konrad Bien-Stephen | The Bachelorette Australia 7 | Episode 9 |
| Grant Crapp | Love Island Australia 1 | Episode 8 |
| Marley Biyendolo | Big Brother Australia 2021 | Episode 7 |
| Ryan Gallagher | Married at First Sight Australia 5 | Episode 6 |
| Johnny Eastoe | Australian Survivor: Champions V Contenders II | Episode 4 |
| David Subritzky | I'm a Celebrity...Get Me Out of Here! Australia 8 | Episode 3 |
| Jack Vidgen | Australia's Got Talent 5 | Episode 2 |
| Billy Dib | Professional boxer | Episode 1 |

List of female contestants, with original series and final placings shown
| Female contestants | Original series/Known for | Finish |
|---|---|---|
| Kiki Morris | The Bachelor Australia 4 | Winner |
| Brooke Jowett | Australian Survivor 2016 | Runner-up |
| Brittany Hockley | The Bachelor Australia 6 | Third place |
| Brooke Blurton | The Bachelor Australia 6 | Episode 9 |
| Megan Marx | The Bachelor Australia 4 | Episode 8 |
| Emily Seebohm | Olympian | Episode 7 |
| Cherneka "Sugar" Johnson | Professional boxer | Episode 6 |
| Cyrell Paule | Married at First Sight Australia 6 | Episode 4 |
| Jessica Brody | The Bachelor Australia 7 | Episode 3 |
| Audrey Kanongara | Love Island Australia 3 | Episode 2 |
| Suzan Mutesi | Actress & Influencer | Episode 1 |

== Gameplay ==
=== Challenge games ===
- Collect Four: Each team begins with a six-by-five board. Throughout the challenge, they must search the Estadio Juan Domingo Perón for their coloured tokens, and can either place the tokens on their board to try and line up four tokens in a row or place them on another team's board to block them. The team to line up four tokens on their board wins. Afterwards, to determine the last-place team, the remaining teams must continue searching the stadium for their tokens and place them on another team's board. The first team to have their board completely blocked is automatically sent to the Arena.
  - Winners: Emily & Ryan
- Truck It: Played two teams at a time, team members begin harnessed on opposite ends of a speeding truck. They must place pegs into slots of the truck to move to the middle, where the team member with the baton must pass it to their partner, who must then return to the end of the truck and smash a hanging pot before the truck reaches the end of the runway. The team with the fastest time wins while the team with the slowest time is automatically sent to the Arena. If multiple teams are unable to finish within the time limit, the last-place team is determined by distance covered.
  - Winners: Jessica & Troy
- Bolas For Blood: Teams must solve three math equations, search a mud pit for six balls to form the answers and clip them onto strings to form three bolas. Teams must then throw their bolas into their post from behind a line. The first team to land all three bolas wins while the last team to finish is automatically sent to the Arena.
  - Winners: Conor & Cyrell
- Build Me Up: Teams must transfer four 45-kilogram wine barrels across a field, stacking them to reach and set off flares atop three stations along the way. The team that sets off all three flares and transfers all four barrels to the finish line first wins while the last team to finish is automatically sent to the Arena.
  - Winners: Emily & Troy
- Buddy Blinders: Teams race 500 metres down a path to a pattern covered by blinds. There, one team member must balance one-footed on a narrow pole to open the blinds and reveal the pattern for their partner to memorise. After the team member balancing falls off, teams must return to their board at the start and attempt to replicate their pattern, repeating this process until they correctly recreate the entire pattern. The first team to finish wins while the last team to finish is automatically sent to the Arena.
  - Winners: Brittany & Conor
- Getting Tyred: Teams swim 300 metres across a lake before running to an abandoned town. There, they collect tyres or tokens and bring them to their station one kilometre away to earn points. Tokens are worth 1 point while tyres are worth 5, 10, 15 or 20 points. However, teams must complete a task to obtain tyres; the more points a tyre is worth, the harder the task is. Teams continue this process for two hours. The team with the most points at the end of two hours wins while the team fewest points is automatically sent to the Arena.
  - Winners: Brooke J. & Troy
- Runaway Ride: Played one team at a time, teams begin in a bus filled with dozens of coloured balls. As the bus loops around a racetrack, teams must study a pattern printed on a board along the track, then recreate it by finding and arranging the required balls in the bus. The team with the most correctly-slotted balls in the fastest time wins while the team with the fewest correct balls or the slowest time is automatically sent to the Arena.
  - Winners: Brooke B. & Ciarran
- Frozen Senseless: One team member must feel through a covered box at one end of a course for three cubes with shapes on each face. They must then meet their partner at the middle of the course and describe the pattern to them so they can assemble the cubes using puzzle pieces at the other end of the course. However, teams must immerse themselves in an ice bath at the middle of the course while communicating the descriptions. The first team to correctly assemble their cubes wins while the last team is automatically sent to the Arena.
  - Winners: Brooke J. & Troy
- Spin Class: All teams begin strapped to a giant wheel. After each spin, the team that the wheel lands on must answer a trivia question; if they are incorrect, they incur a strike. Teams are eliminated from the challenge once they incur three strikes. The last team standing wins while the first team eliminated is automatically sent to the Arena.
  - Winners: Conor & Kiki

=== Arena games ===
- Knot So Fast: Teams have 20 minutes to create as many knots as they can using a 50-metre rope within a pyramid structure. After those 20 minutes are up, teams switch positions and must untie their opponent's knots. The first team to untie their opponent's knots and drag the rope across a marked line wins.
  - Played by: Billy & Suzan vs. Cyrell & Jack
- In Your Face: Teams must stack cinder blocks on a box to release a set of balls. One team member must then throw the balls at ten targets of their opponent's faces while their partner tries to block their opponent's shots. The first team to hit all ten targets wins.
  - Played by: Audrey & Jack vs. David & Emily
- Spelling Eeb: Teams begin with stack of tyres. Each team member is asked to spell a word backwards; if they are incorrect, six tyres are added to their stack. Afterwards, teams must transfer and restack all their tyres on a platform at the opposite end of the Arena. The first team to restack all their tyres wins.
  - Played by: David & Jessica vs. Grant & Kiki
- A Dark Turn: While tied together, teams enter a dark container to find a stack of varying sized puzzle pieces. Using their sense of touch, they must identify the order the pieces are stacked in and replicate the stack using pieces outside. The first team to correctly replicate their stack wins.
  - Played by: Conor & Megan vs. Cyrell & Johnny
- Ball & Chain: Teams open six panels at the top of a three-metre wall to reveal six trivia questions. They must search among several 15-kilogram medicine balls wrapped in chains for six with the answers on them, and hang them on hooks below their respective question. The first team to correctly answer all six questions wins.
  - Played by: Brooke B. & Grant vs. Ryan & Sugar
- Balls In: Played in a male and female round. Each round, team members of the designated gender play both offense and defense. The offense player has three attempts to deposit a ball into a goal at the center of a ring while the defense player attempts to stop them by blocking them and knocking the ball out of bounds. Players then switch roles and repeat the process. The player who scores the most goals wins the round for their team. The first team to win two rounds wins. If teams are tied after both rounds, a coin flip is held to determine which gender participates in a tiebreaker round.
  - Played by: Emily & Grant vs. Ryan & Sugar
- You Move I Move: Teams must stand on and tilt two platforms to maneuver five balls through a table maze. The first team to move all five balls to the end of the maze wins.
  - Played by: Conor & Kiki vs. Emily & Marley
- In A Roll: Teams begin inside a giant steel wheel connected to a 100-metre rope with a ball at the end. They must spin the wheel to unravel the rope and pull the ball towards them. The first team to pull the ball towards their wheel twice wins.
  - Played by: Brittany & Ciarran vs. Grant & Megan
- Pato Brawl: Played in male and female rounds. Each round, team members of the designated gender begin at the center of the Arena with both hands on a pato ball. The first player to wrestle the ball out of their opponent's hands two out of three times wins the round for their team. The first team to win two rounds wins.
  - Played by: Brittany & Troy vs. Brooke B. & Konrad

=== Final Challenge ===
After the "Pato Brawl" elimination, the Algorithm selected new teams before it was announced the remaining six contestants would immediately commence the Final Challenge. The Final Challenge consisted of an Overnight Stage and three checkpoints, which players completed in male-female pairs; the Algorithm selected new pairs for each checkpoint. At the end of the Final Challenge, each individual's time from the three checkpoints was accumulated to determine the male and female winners of Australia, who receive $100,000 each. If, at any point, a teammate quits, their partner is also eliminated.

Day one

- Overnight Stage: Teams race to a campsite in an abandoned town and solve a puzzle. Once complete, one team member at a time may sleep in a tent while their partner must stand on a platform outside during this time.

Day two

- Checkpoint #1: Team members remain with their partner from the Overnight Stage for the checkpoint. Teams must collectively cycle 100 km on a stationary bike, then race to a river and swim to two buoys to collect bags of puzzle pieces. After returning the puzzle pieces to their station, teams must then run down a path to view and memorize an answer key before recreating the key at their station using the puzzle pieces.
- Checkpoint #2: Teams must carry a plank to a field and use it to transfer three barrels across the field without touching the ground. Once complete, teams proceed to the next checkpoint.
- Checkpoint #3: Teams must transfer 16 tyres labelled with the names of eliminated contestants from the season down a track and arrange them on a pole in the order they were eliminated. Afterwards, they must push a 1,500-kilogram car across a 100-metre field before proceeding to the finish line where the results are announced.
  - Winners: Kiki and Troy ($100,000 each)
  - Runners-up: Ciarran and Brooke J.
  - Third place: Brittany and Conor

== Game summary ==
| Episode | | Winners | Arena contestants | | Arena game | Arena outcome | |
| # | Challenge | Winners | Last place | Winners' pick | Arena game | Winners | Losers |
|---|---|---|---|---|---|---|---|
| 1 | Collect Four | Emily & Ryan | Cyrell & Jack | Billy & Suzan | Knot So Fast | Cyrell & Jack | Billy & Suzan |
| 2 | Truck It | Jessica & Troy | Audrey & Jack | David & Emily | In Your Face | David & Emily | Audrey & Jack |
| 3 | Bolas For Blood | Conor & Cyrell | David & Jessica | Grant & Kiki | Spelling Eeb | Grant & Kiki | David & Jessica |
| 4 | Build Me Up | Emily & Troy | Cyrell & Johnny | Conor & Megan | A Dark Turn | Conor & Megan | Cyrell & Johnny |
| 5 (Note: In a twist to mark the halfway point of the season, Ryan & Sugar were not eliminated after losing the "Ball & Chain" elimination in Episode 5. The winners of the elimination, Brooke B. & Grant, then had the choice to stay partnered for the next challenge or separate; they elected to separate. Afterwards, the reigning daily challenge winners, Brittany & Conor, were appointed as "the Algorithm" and selected the teams for the next challenge.) | Buddy Blinders | Brittany & Conor | Brooke B. & Grant | Ryan & Sugar | Ball & Chain | Brooke B. & Grant | Ryan & Sugar |
| 6 | Getting Tyred | Brooke J. & Troy | Emily & Grant | Ryan & Sugar | Balls In | Emily & Grant | Ryan & Sugar |
| 7 | Runaway Ride | Brooke B. & Ciarran | Conor & Kiki | Emily & Marley | You Move I Move | Conor & Kiki | Emily & Marley |
| 8 | Frozen Senseless | Brooke J. & Troy | Grant & Megan | Brittany & Ciarran | In A Roll | Brittany & Ciarran | Grant & Megan |
| 9 | Spin Class | Conor & Kiki | Brittany & Troy | Brooke B. & Konrad | Pato Brawl | Brittany & Troy | Brooke B. & Konrad |
| 10 | Final Challenge | Kiki | 2nd place: Brooke J.; 3rd place: Brittany | | | | |
| 10 | Final Challenge | Troy | 2nd place: Ciarran; 3rd place: Conor | | | | |

=== Episode progress ===
| Contestants | Episodes | | | | | | | | | |
| Contestants | 1 | 2 | 3 | 4 | 5 | 6 | 7 | 8 | 9 | Finale |
|---|---|---|---|---|---|---|---|---|---|---|
| Kiki | SAFE | SAFE | ELIM | SAFE | SAFE | SAFE | ELIM | SAFE | WIN | WINNER |
| Troy | SAFE | WIN | SAFE | WIN | SAFE | WIN | SAFE | WIN | ELIM | WINNER |
| Brooke J. | SAFE | SAFE | SAFE | SAFE | SAFE | WIN | SAFE | WIN | SAFE | SECOND |
| Ciarran | SAFE | SAFE | SAFE | SAFE | SAFE | SAFE | WIN | ELIM | SAFE | SECOND |
| Brittany | SAFE | SAFE | SAFE | SAFE | WIN | SAFE | SAFE | ELIM | ELIM | THIRD |
| Conor | SAFE | SAFE | WIN | ELIM | WIN | SAFE | ELIM | SAFE | WIN | THIRD |
| Brooke B. | SAFE | SAFE | SAFE | SAFE | ELIM | SAFE | WIN | SAFE | OUT | |
| Konrad | SAFE | SAFE | SAFE | SAFE | SAFE | SAFE | SAFE | SAFE | OUT | |
| Grant | SAFE | SAFE | ELIM | SAFE | ELIM | ELIM | SAFE | OUT | | |
| Megan | SAFE | SAFE | SAFE | ELIM | SAFE | SAFE | SAFE | OUT | | |
| Emily | WIN | ELIM | SAFE | WIN | SAFE | ELIM | OUT | | | |
| Marley | SAFE | SAFE | SAFE | SAFE | SAFE | SAFE | OUT | | | |
| Ryan | WIN | SAFE | SAFE | SAFE | LOSE | OUT | | | | |
| Sugar | SAFE | SAFE | SAFE | SAFE | LOSE | OUT | | | | |
| Cyrell | ELIM | SAFE | WIN | OUT | | | | | | |
| Johnny | SAFE | SAFE | SAFE | OUT | | | | | | |
| David | SAFE | ELIM | OUT | | | | | | | |
| Jessica | SAFE | WIN | OUT | | | | | | | |
| Audrey | SAFE | OUT | | | | | | | | |
| Jack | ELIM | OUT | | | | | | | | |
| Billy | OUT | | | | | | | | | |
| Suzan | OUT | | | | | | | | | |

Competition
The contestant finished the Final Challenge and won
The contestant finished the Final Challenge and lost
The contestant won the daily challenge
The contestant was not selected for the Arena
The contestant won the elimination in the Arena
The contestant lost in the Arena but was not eliminated due to a twist
The contestant lost in the Arena and was eliminated

== Team progress ==
For the first episode, players chose their own teams prior to the "Collect Four" challenge. From episode two, teams were decided by the Algorithm.

| Contestants | Episodes | | | | | | | | | | | |
| Contestants | 1 | 2 | 3 | 4 | 5 | 6 | 7 | 8 | 9 | Finale | | |
|---|---|---|---|---|---|---|---|---|---|---|---|---|
| Kiki | David | Ryan | Grant | Ciarran | Troy | Ciarran | Conor | Konrad | Conor | Ciarran | Troy | Conor |
| Troy | Brooke B. | Jessica | Brittany | Emily | Kiki | Brooke J. | Megan | Brooke J. | Brittany | Brooke J. | Kiki | Brittany |
| Brooke J. | Conor | Konrad | Ryan | Marley | Ciarran | Troy | Grant | Troy | Ciarran | Troy | Conor | Ciarran |
| Ciarran | Brittany | Megan | Emily | Kiki | Brooke J. | Kiki | Brooke B. | Brittany | Brooke J. | Kiki | Brittany | Brooke J. |
| Brittany | Ciarran | Johnny | Troy | Grant | Conor | Marley | Konrad | Ciarran | Troy | Conor | Ciarran | Troy |
| Conor | Brooke J. | Brooke B. | Cyrell | Megan | Brittany | Megan | Kiki | Brooke B. | Kiki | Brittany | Brooke J. | Kiki |
| Brooke B. | Troy | Conor | Konrad | Ryan | Grant | Konrad | Ciarran | Conor | Konrad | | | |
| Konrad | Megan | Brooke J. | Brooke B. | Sugar | Emily | Brooke B. | Brittany | Kiki | Brooke B. | | | |
| Grant | Jessica | Sugar | Kiki | Brittany | Brooke B. | Emily | Brooke J. | Megan | | | | |
| Megan | Konrad | Ciarran | Johnny | Conor | Marley | Conor | Troy | Grant | | | | |
| Emily | Ryan | David | Ciarran | Troy | Konrad | Grant | Marley | | | | | |
| Marley | Audrey | Cyrell | Sugar | Brooke J. | Megan | Brittany | Emily | | | | | |
| Ryan | Emily | Kiki | Brooke J. | Brooke B. | Sugar | Sugar | | | | | | |
| Sugar | Johnny | Grant | Marley | Konrad | Ryan | Ryan | | | | | | |
| Cyrell | Jack | Marley | Conor | Johnny | | | | | | | | |
| Johnny | Sugar | Brittany | Megan | Cyrell | | | | | | | | |
| David | Kiki | Emily | Jessica | | | | | | | | | |
| Jessica | Grant | Troy | David | | | | | | | | | |
| Audrey | Marley | Jack | | | | | | | | | | |
| Jack | Cyrell | Audrey | | | | | | | | | | |
| Billy | Suzan | | | | | | | | | | | |
| Suzan | Billy | | | | | | | | | | | |

== Ratings ==
| No. | Title | Air date | Timeslot | Overnight ratings | | Consolidated ratings | | Total viewers | Ref(s) |
| No. | Title | Air date | Timeslot | Viewers | Rank | Viewers | Rank | Total viewers | Ref(s) |
|---|---|---|---|---|---|---|---|---|---|
| 1 | "You Wanna Win Or Knot?" | 14 November 2022 | Monday 7:30 pm | 257,000 | 20 | 206,000 | —N/a | 463,000 | |
| 2 | "Mother Truckers" | 15 November 2022 | Tuesday 7:30 pm | 193,000 | >20 | 159,000 | —N/a | 352,000 | |
| 3 | "Rock-N-Bola" | 21 November 2022 | Monday 7:30 pm | 168,000 | >20 | —N/a | —N/a | 168,000 | |
| 4 | "Whine Barrels" | 22 November 2022 | Tuesday 7:30 pm | 136,000 | >20 | —N/a | —N/a | 136,000 | |
| 5 | "A Wonderful Bachy Holiday" | 28 November 2022 | Monday 8:30 pm | 96,000 | >20 | —N/a | —N/a | 96,000 | |
| 6 | "Tyred of You" | 28 November 2022 | Monday 9:30 pm | 72,000 | >20 | —N/a | —N/a | 72,000 | |
| 7 | "Ball Busters" | 5 December 2022 | Monday 9:00 pm | | —N/a | —N/a | —N/a | | |
| 8 | "Brain Freezer" | 5 December 2022 | Monday 10:00 pm | | —N/a | —N/a | —N/a | | |
| 9 | "Do Some Ninja Sh*t" | 12 December 2022 | Monday 09:00 pm | | —N/a | —N/a | —N/a | | |
| 10 | "The Final Push" | 13 December 2022 | Tuesday 09:00 pm | 11,000 | >20 | —N/a | —N/a | 11,000 | |
