= Dancing with the Stars (Australian TV series) season 22 =

Dancing with the Stars
- Season 22
- Hosted by: Chris Brown; Sonia Kruger
- Judges: Sharna Burgess; Craig Revel Horwood; Helen Richey; Mark Wilson
- Celebrity winner: Kyle Shilling
- Professional winner: Lily Cornish

Release
- Original network: Seven Network
- Original release: 15 June – 4 August 2025

Season chronology
- ← Previous; Season 21

The twenty-second season of the Australian Dancing with the Stars premiered on 15 June 2025 on Seven.

Sonia Kruger and Chris Brown returned as hosts, while Helen Richey, Mark Wilson, Craig Revel Horwood and Sharna Burgess all returned to the judging panel from the previous season.

== Couples ==
This season features 12 couples.

In November 2024, Shaun Micallef was announced as the first celebrity participant. In February 2025, Brittany Hockley, Harry Garside and Rebecca Gibney were announced to also be participating. The full cast of celebrities were announced on 10 February 2025.

Celebrity	Notability	Professional partner	Status
Susie O'Neill	Olympic swimmer	Lyu Masuda	Eliminated 1st on 29 June 2025
Karina Carvalho	7NEWS presenter & journalist	Andrey Gorbunov	Eliminated 2nd on 6 July 2025
Rebecca Gibney	Film & television actress	Ian Waite	Eliminated 3rd on 13 July 2025
Osher Günsberg	Television presenter	Sriani Argaet	Eliminated 4th on 20 July 2025
Harry Garside	Olympic boxer	Siobhan Power	Eliminated 5th on 27 July 2025
Mia Fevola	Social media personality	Gustavo Viglio	Eliminated 6th on 28 July 2025
Michael Usher	7NEWS presenter	Natalie Lowe	Finalists on 4 August 2025
Felicity Ward	Comedian & actress	Aric Yegudkin	Finalists on 4 August 2025
Brittany Hockley	KIIS Network presenter	Craig Monley	Finalists on 4 August 2025
Trent Cotchin	Former AFL player	Jessica Raffa	Finalists on 4 August 2025
Shaun Micallef	Comedian, actor & television presenter	Ash-Leigh Hunter	Runners-up on 4 August 2025
Kyle Shilling	Home and Away actor	Lily Cornish	Winners on 4 August 2025

== Scoring chart ==
The highest score each week is indicated in bold green with a dagger (†), while the lowest score each week is indicated in italicized red with a double-dagger (‡).

Dancing with the Stars (season 22) - Weekly scores
Couple	Pl.	Week										
Couple	Pl.	1	2	3	1+3	4	2+4	5	6	7		8
Couple	Pl.	1	2	3	1+3	4	2+4	5	6	Night 1	Night 2	8
Kyle & Lily	1st	—	**24**†	—		21	45	—	**40**†	—	29‡	**40**†
Shaun & Ash-Leigh	2nd	—	**24**†	—		24	48	—	23	—	30	37
Trent & Jessica	3rd	21	—	30	51	—		**35**†	—	34	—	35
Felicity & Aric	3rd	—	22	—		31	53	—	33	—	**33**†	33
Brittany & Craig	3rd	21	—	**31**†	**52**†	—		33	—	**35**†	—	32
Michael & Natalie	3rd	**27**†	—	25	**52**†	—		29	—	19‡	—	28‡
Mia & Gustavo	7th	—	23	—		**34**†	**57**†	—	28	—	31	
Harry & Siobhan	8th	21	—	25	46	—		25‡	—	20		
Osher & Sriani	9th	—	9‡	—		18‡	27‡	—	15‡			
Rebecca & Ian	10th	24	—	25	49	—		28				
Karina & Andrey	11th	—	23	—		20	43					
Susie & Lyu	12th	13‡	—	15‡	28‡							

=== Average chart ===
Couple	Rank by average	Total points	Number of dances	Total average
Trent & Jessica	1st	155	5	31.0
Kyle & Lily	2nd	154	5	30.8
Felicity & Aric	3rd	152	5	30.4
Brittany & Craig	3rd	152	5	30.4
Mia & Gustavo	5th	116	4	29.0
Shaun & Ash-Leigh	6th	138	5	27.6
Rebecca & Ian	7th	77	3	25.7
Michael & Natalie	8th	128	5	25.6
Harry & Siobhan	9th	91	4	22.8
Karina & Andrey	10th	43	2	21.5
Osher & Sriani	11th	42	3	14.0
Susie & Lyu	11th	28	2	14.0

== Weekly scores ==
Individual judges' scores in the charts below (given in parentheses) are listed in this order from left to right: Craig Revel Horwood, Helen Richey, Sharna Burgess, Mark Wilson.

=== Week 1 ===
Couples are listed in the order they performed.

Couple	Scores	Dance	Music
Trent & Jessica	21 (4, 6, 5, 6)	Tango	"Shivers" − Ed Sheeran
Brittany & Craig	21 (4, 6, 5, 6)	Cha-cha-cha	"Never Gonna Not Dance Again" − Pink
Harry & Siobhan	21 (3, 6, 5, 7)	Jive	"Good Golly, Miss Molly" − Little Richard
Susie & Lyu	13 (2, 4, 4, 3)	Tango	"Titanium" − David Guetta ft. Sia
Michael & Natalie	27 (6, 7, 6, 8)	Foxtrot	"They Can't Take That Away from Me" − Ella Fitzgerald & Louis Armstrong
Rebecca & Ian	24 (6, 6, 6, 6)	Cha-cha-cha	"Best of My Love" − The Emotions

=== Week 2 ===
Couples are listed in the order they performed.

Couple	Scores	Dance	Music
Felicity & Aric	22 (4, 6, 6, 6)	Paso doble	"Free Your Mind" − En Vogue
Kyle & Lily	24 (3, 7, 7, 7)	Cha-cha-cha	"Lil Boo Thang" − Paul Russell
Karina & Andrey	23 (5, 6, 5, 7)	Viennese waltz	"I Have Nothing" − Whitney Houston
Mia & Gustavo	23 (6, 5, 6, 6)	Cha-cha-cha	"Espresso" − Sabrina Carpenter
Osher & Sriani	9 (1, 3, 3, 2)	Foxtrot	"My Girl" − The Temptations
Shaun & Ash-Leigh	24 (5, 7, 6, 6)	Quickstep	"Sing, Sing, Sing (With a Swing)" − Benny Goodman

=== Week 3 ===
Couples are listed in the order they performed.

Couple	Scores	Dance	Music	Result
Michael & Natalie	25 (5, 7, 6, 7)	Paso Doble	"Live and Let Die" – Paul McCartney and Wings	Safe
Susie & Lyu	15 (2, 5, 4, 4)	Foxtrot	"Haven't Met You Yet" – Michael Bublé	Eliminated
Harry & Siobhan	25 (5, 6, 7, 7)	Contemporary	"I'm Not the Only One" – Sam Smith	Bottom two
Trent & Jessica	30 (6, 8, 8, 8)	Foxtrot	"Hold My Girl" – George Ezra	Safe
Rebecca & Ian	25 (5, 7, 6, 7)	Viennese Waltz	"At Last" – Etta James	Safe
Brittany & Craig	31 (7, 7, 8, 9)	Samba	"Higher Love" – Kygo and Whitney Houston	Safe

=== Week 4 ===
Couples are listed in the order they performed.

Couple	Scores	Dance	Music	Result
Kyle & Lily	21 (4, 6, 6, 5)	Viennese Waltz	"Lose Control" – Teddy Swims	Safe
Karina & Andrey	20 (4, 6, 5, 5)	Salsa	"No No No" – Boogaloo Assassins	Eliminated
Mia & Gustavo	34 (8, 8, 9, 9)	Viennese Waltz	"Runaway" – The Corrs	Safe
Shaun & Ash-Leigh	24 (4, 7, 6, 7)	Foxtrot	"Come Fly with Me" – Frank Sinatra	Safe
Osher & Sriani	18 (4, 5, 4, 5)	Jive	"You Make My Dreams" – Hall and Oates	Bottom two
Felicity & Aric	31 (6, 7, 9, 9)	Cha-cha-cha	"Love at First Sight" – Kylie Minogue	Safe

=== Week 5 ===
Couples are listed in the order they performed.

Couple	Scores	Dance	Music	Result
Rebecca & Ian	28 (6, 8, 7, 7)	Paso Doble	"Queen of the Night" – Whitney Houston	Eliminated
Brittany & Craig	33 (7, 8, 9, 9)	Tango	"Padam Padam" – Kylie Minogue	Safe
Harry & Siobhan	25 (4, 7, 7, 7)	Rumba	"A Touch of Paradise" – John Farnham	Safe
Michael & Natalie	29 (5, 8, 8, 8)	Viennese Waltz	"One and Only" – Adele	Bottom two
Trent & Jessica	35 (8, 9, 9, 9)	Jive	"Blue Suede Shoes" – Elvis Presley	Safe

=== Week 6 ===
Couples are listed in the order they performed.

Couple	Scores	Dance	Music	Result
Shaun & Ash-Leigh	23 (3, 7, 6, 7)	Paso Doble	"We Will Rock You" – Queen	Bottom two
Osher & Sriani	15 (2, 5, 4, 4)	Tango	"Fashion" – David Bowie	Eliminated
Mia & Gustavo	28 (7, 7, 7, 7)	Rumba	"Crazy for You" – Madonna	Safe
Felicity & Aric	33 (7, 8, 8, 10)	Foxtrot	"Birds of a Feather" – Billie Eilish	Safe
Kyle & Lily	40 (10, 10, 10, 10)	Jive	"I'm Still Standing" – Elton John	Safe

=== Week 7: Semifinals ===
(Night 1)

Couples are listed in the order they performed.

Couple	Scores	Dance	Music	Result
Harry & Siobhan	20 (4, 6, 5, 5)	Tango	"Whatever It Takes" – Imagine Dragons	Eliminated
Trent & Jessica	34 (7, 9, 9, 9)	Cha-cha-cha	"Smooth" – Santana ft. Rob Thomas	Safe
Brittany & Craig	35 (7, 9, 9, 10)	Waltz	"Dive" – Ed Sheeran	Safe
Michael & Natalie	19 (3, 6, 5, 5)	Jive	"Proud Mary" – Tina Turner	Safe

(Night 2)

Couples are listed in the order they performed.

Couple	Scores	Dance	Music	Result
Kyle & Lily	29 (4, 8, 9, 8)	Quickstep	"Wake Me Up" – Avicii	Safe
Felicity & Aric	33 (6, 9, 9, 9)	Samba	"All Night Long (All Night)" – Lionel Richie	Safe
Mia & Gustavo	31 (6, 8, 8, 9)	Foxtrot	"Ordinary People" – John Legend	Eliminated
Shaun & Ash-Leigh	30 (6, 8, 8, 8)	Cha-cha-cha	"Get Up Offa That Thing" – James Brown	Safe

=== Week 8: Final ===
Couples are listed in the order they performed.

Couple	Scores	Dance	Music	Result
Felicity & Aric	33 (7, 8, 9, 9)	Freestyle	"Happy" — C2C feat. Derek Martin	Finalists
Michael & Natalie	28 (7, 7, 7, 7)	Freestyle	"Come Alive" - The Greatest Showman cast	Finalists
Trent & Jessica	35 (8, 9, 9, 9)	Freestyle	"Beautiful Things" – Benson Boone	Finalists
Kyle & Lily	40 (10, 10, 10, 10)	Freestyle	"Native Tongue" - Mo'Ju	Winners
Brittany & Craig	32 (7, 9, 9, 7)	Freestyle	"Lanterns" - Birds of Tokyo	Finalists
Shaun & Ash-Leigh	37 (9, 10, 9, 9)	Freestyle	"If My Friends Could See Me Now" from Sweet Charity	Runners-up

== Ratings ==
Episode		Original airdate		Total Viewers^{[a]}	Rank	Source
1	"Week One"	15 June 2025	Sunday; 7:00 pm	981,000	3	
2	"Week Two"	22 June 2025	Sunday; 7:00 pm	909,000	4	
3	"Week Three"	29 June 2025	Sunday; 7:00 pm	921,000	4	
4	"Week Four"	6 July 2025	Sunday; 7:00 pm	939,000	4	
5	"Week Five"	13 July 2025	Sunday; 7:00 pm	889,000	4	
6	"Week Six"	20 July 2025	Sunday; 7:00 pm	909,000	4	
7	"Week Seven, Night 1"	27 July 2025	Sunday; 7:00 pm	943,000	4	
8	"Week Seven, Night 2"	28 July 2025	Monday; 7:30 pm	846,000	6	
9	"Week Eight: Final"	4 August 2025	Monday; 7:30 pm	937,000	5	

- ^{a} From 28 January 2024, OzTAM ratings changed. Viewership data now focus on National Reach and National Total ratings instead of the 5 metro centres and overnight shares.
