= Brittany Hockley =

Australian radio host, podcaster, television and media personality and author

- Born: 21 August 1987 (age 39); Port Macquarie, New South Wales, Australia
- Occupations: Radio host, podcaster, television, media personality, author
- Years active: 2018–present
- Employer: KIIS Network
- Television: The Bachelor Australia; Bachelor in Paradise Australia; The Challenge: Australia; I'm a Celebrity...Get Me Out of Here! Australia
- Spouse: Benjamin Siegrist (m. 2025)

Brittany Hockley (born 21 August 1987) is an Australian radio host, podcaster, television and media personality and author. She rose to fame as a runner up on the sixth season of Network 10's The Bachelor Australia, and then went on to appear on the third season of Bachelor in Paradise Australia. She currently co-hosts the drive radio show The Pick Up on the KIIS Network alongside Laura Byrne, and also co-hosts the Life Uncut podcast with Byrne.

== Career ==
In 2018, Hockley appeared as a contestant on Network 10's dating love reality show The Bachelor Australia, in the show's sixth season. She ended up as a runner up on the series, alongside Sophie Tieman, after Bachelor Nick Cummins, chose neither girls as his final decision.

In 2019, Hockley and Laura Byrne created and began hosting a podcast titled Life Uncut, which officially launched in July 2019.

In March 2020, Network 10 announced that Hockley would appear on the forthcoming third season of the dating show Bachelor in Paradise Australia. The show officially premiered in July, after being slated for April. She was eliminated and left the island in episode 10, alongside former The Bachelorette Australia contestant Timm Hanly.

Following the success of the podcast, in November 2021 it was announced that Hockley and Byrne had been picked up by the KIIS Network to produce a radio show titled Life Uncut Radio Show, which would debut in 2022 as a part of the network's Saturday weekly lineup.

In 2022, Hockley and Laura Byrne wrote and released a book together titled We Love Love.

In November 2022, Hockley appeared as a contestant on Network 10's brand new reality competition series, The Challenge: Australia. She was placed third overall.

In 2023, Hockley was announced as co-host of the revamped KIIS FM drive radio show The Pick Up alongside Laura Byrne.

In March 2024, Hockley was revealed to be a contestant on the forthcoming tenth season of Network 10's I'm a Celebrity...Get Me Out of Here! Australia. She was the eighth contestant to be eliminated, leaving the jungle on the 18 of April alongside Paralympian Ellie Cole.

In 2025, Hockley became a contestant on the twenty-second season of Seven Network's Dancing with the Stars Australia, where she was paired up with Craig Monley.

In 2026 Hockley and Byrne will move from the KIIS Network to Southern Cross Austereo.

== Personal life ==
In 2022, Hockley began dating Swiss footballer Benjamin Siegrist, who lived overseas. In June 2024, the couple announced their engagement. They got married on 4 June 2025. Hockley and Siegrist are currently pregnant with their first child.
