= Bachelor in Paradise (Australian TV series) season 3 =

Bachelor Season 3

Bachelor in Paradise
- Season 3
- No. of episodes: 13

Release
- Original network: Network 10
- Original release: 15 July – 9 August 2020

Season chronology
- ← Previous; Season 2

The third season of Bachelor in Paradise Australia premiered on 15 July 2020. Osher Günsberg reprised his role as host from the previous two series and the Bachelor Australia franchise.

Intended to air in April 2020, the airing of the show was held back by 10 to cover for the production shut-downs caused by the COVID-19 pandemic. The series premiered on 15 July 2020.

== Contestants ==
Abbie, Ciarran, Timm, Brittany and Jamie were revealed on 13 March 2020. Helena, Mary, Brittney and Cass were further announced on 17 June 2020. The full returning Episode 1 cast were revealed on 6 July 2020, which included Jake, Glenn, Janey and Niranga. Keira was also announced as an intruder and she first appeared in episode five. Jessica was announced as an intruder at the end of the first episode and Renee was announced at the end of the second, making their first appearance in the second and third episodes respectively. Alisha was announced as an intruder on 19 July 2020. Conor, Chris and Tim, who had not appeared on any season of The Bachelorette or a Bachelor franchise series, were announced as intruders on 22 July 2020. Kiki entered Paradise as an intruder in episode 5 and Jackson, Matt and Scot in episode 7.

Name	Age	Hometown	Occupation	From	Arrived	Eliminated
Glenn Smith	32	Perth, Western Australia	Refrigeration Mechanic	The Bachelorette Australia, season 5	Episode 1	Relationship (Married 22 April 2023)
Alisha Aitken-Radburn	27	Sydney, New South Wales	Political Adviser	The Bachelor Australia, season 6 Bachelor in Paradise Australia, season 2	Episode 4	Relationship (Married 22 April 2023)
Conor Canning	29	Hobart, Tasmania	Business Director & Auctioneer	N/A	Episode 4	Relationship
Mary Viturino	32	Melbourne, Victoria	Cook	The Bachelor Australia, season 7	Episode 1	Relationship
Matt Whyatt	28	Gold Coast, Queensland	BMX Stunt Rider	The Bachelorette Australia, season 5	Episode 7	Relationship (Split after Paradise)
Renee Barrett	26	Darwin, Northern Territory	Healthcare Coordinator	The Bachelor Australia, season 7	Episode 3	Relationship (Split after Paradise)
Ciarran Stott	26	Darwin, Northern Territory	Ex-Army Rifleman	The Bachelorette Australia, season 5	Episode 1	Episode 13 (Leave Together)
Kiki Morris	32	Sydney, New South Wales	Personal Assistant	The Bachelor Australia, season 4	Episode 5	Episode 13 (Leave Together)
Mia MacKinnon	28	Sydney, New South Wales	Model & Former Athlete	The Bachelor Australia, season 4	Episode 10	Episode 12 (Leave Together)
Scot Fuller	28	Byron Bay, New South Wales	Real Estate Agent	The Bachelorette Australia, season 5	Episode 7	Episode 12 (Leave Together)
Brittney Weldon	26	Gold Coast, Queensland	Housing Officer	The Bachelor Australia, season 6; Bachelor in Paradise Australia, season 2	Episode 1	Episode 12 (Leave Together)
Jackson Garlick	25	Sydney, New South Wales	Sales Manager	The Bachelorette Australia, season 5	Episode 7	Episode 12 (Leave Together)
Alex Mckay	26	Gold Coast, Queensland	Landscaper	The Bachelorette Australia, season 5	Episode 4	Episode 11 (Quit)
Keira Maguire	33	Sydney, New South Wales	Account Manager	The Bachelor Australia, season 4; Bachelor in Paradise Australia, season 1	Episode 5	Episode 11 (Quit)
Cass Mamone	34	Adelaide, South Australia	Jewellery Designer	The Bachelor Australia, season 7	Episode 1	Episode 10
Keely Spedding	28	Brisbane, Queensland	Textile Designer	The Bachelor Australia, season 7	Episode 9	Episode 10
Timm Hanly	27	Melbourne, Victoria	Fireproofer	The Bachelorette Australia, season 5	Episode 1	Episode 10 (Leave Together)
Brittany Hockley	32	Port Macquarie, New South Wales	Radiographer	The Bachelor Australia, season 6	Episode 1	Episode 10 (Leave Together)
Chris "Gilly" Gilleland	32	Geraldton, Western Australia	Mining Technician	—	Episode 4	Episode 8
Jamie Doran	40	Sydney, New South Wales	Firefighter	The Bachelorette Australia, season 5	Episode 1	Episode 8
Niranga Amarasinghe	28	Brisbane, Queensland	Aircraft Engineer	The Bachelorette Australia, season 5	Episode 1	Episode 8
Helena Sauzier	25	Perth, Western Australia	Wellness Coach	The Bachelor Australia, season 7	Episode 1	Episode 6
Jessica Brody	30	Melbourne, Victoria	Makeup Artist	The Bachelor Australia, season 7	Episode 2	Episode 6
Tim Lindenmayer	30	Adelaide, South Australia	Aircraft Engineer	—	Episode 4	Episode 4
Jake Ellis	33	Gold Coast, Queensland	Sales Professional	The Bachelorette Australia, season 2; Bachelor in Paradise Australia, season 1	Episode 1	Episode 4 (Quit)
Abbie Chatfield	24	Brisbane, Queensland	Property Analyst	The Bachelor Australia, season 7	Episode 1	Episode 2
Janey Birks	30	Brisbane, Queensland	Children's Entertainer	The Bachelor Australia, season 4	Episode 1	Episode 2

== Elimination table ==
Place	Contestant	Week						
Place	Contestant	1 (Note: Episodes 1 and 2)	2 (Note: Episodes 3 and 4)	3 (Note: Episodes 5 and 6)	4 (Note: Episodes 7 and 8)	5 (Note: Episodes 9 and 10)	6 (Note: Episodes 11 and 12)	7 (Note: Episode 13)
1-6
1-6	Alisha	Not in Paradise	Date (Cleanskins & Glenn)	In	In	In	In	Stay (Glenn)
1-6	Glenn	In	Date (Alisha)	In	In	In	In	Stay (Alisha)
1-6	Conor	Not in Paradise	Date (Alisha)	Date (Keira & Mary)	In	In	In	Stay (Mary)
1-6	Mary	In	In	Date (Conor)	In	In	In	Stay (Conor)
1-6	Matt	Not in Paradise			Date (Renee)	Date (Renee)	In	Stay/Split (Renee)
1-6	Renee	Not in Paradise	In	In	Date (Matt)	Date (Matt)	In	Stay/Split (Matt)
7–8	Ciarran	Date (Abbie)	In	Date (Kiki)	In	In	In	Leave/Split (Kiki)
7–8	Kiki	Not in Paradise		Date (Ciarran)	In	In	In	Leave/Split (Ciarran)
9–12	Mia	Not in Paradise				In	Leave/Split (Scott)	
9–12	Scot	Not in Paradise			Last	In	Leave/Split (Mia)	
9–12	Brittney	Last (Timm)	In	In	In	In	Leave/Split (Jackson)	
9–12	Jackson	Not in Paradise			In	Date (Cass)	Leave/Split (Brittany)	
13–14	Alex	Not in Paradise	In	Date (Jess)	In	In	Split (Keira)	
13–14	Keira	Not in Paradise		Last (Conor)	In	Last	Split (Alex)	
15–16	Cass	In	In	In	Date (Niranga)	Out (Jackson)		
15–16	Keely	Not in Paradise				Out		
17–18	Timm	Date (Brittany & Brittney)	In	In	In	Leave/Split (Brittany)		
17–18	Brittany	Date (Timm)	In	In	In	Leave/Split (Timm)		
19–21	Gilly	Not in Paradise	Date (Alisha)	In	Out			
19–21	Jamie	In	Last	In	Out			
19–21	Niranga	In	In	In	Out (Cass)			
22–23	Helena	In	Date (Jake)	Out				
22–23	Jessica	In	In	Out				
24–25	Tim	Not in Paradise	Out (Alisha)					
24–25	Jake	In	Quit (Helena)					
26–27	Abbie	Out (Ciarran)						
26–27	Janey	Out						

Colour Key
The contestant is male.
The contestant is female.
Date The contestant went on a date and gave out a rose at the rose ceremony.
Date The contestant went on a date and received a rose at the rose ceremony.
In The contestant gave or received a rose at the rose ceremony, thus remaining in the competition.
Last The contestant received the last rose.
Last The contestant went on a date and received the last rose.
Out The contestant went on a date and was eliminated.
Out The contestant was eliminated.
Quit The contestant had a date and voluntarily left the show.
Quit The contestant voluntarily left the show.
Leave/Split The couple left the show together but later split.
Split The couple broke up and were eliminated.
Stay/Split The couple decided to stay together, but split after Bachelor in Paradise Australia ended.
Stay The couple decided to stay together and won the competition.

== Episodes ==
No. Overall	No. in Season	Original Air Date	Event & Description
30	Episode 1	15 July 2020	Arrivals: Timm, Abbie, Helena, Brittney, Brittany, Glenn, Niranga, Mary, Janey, Jake, Ciarran, Cass and Jamie entered Paradise. Timm's Double Date: Brittney and Brittany.
31	Episode 2	16 July 2020	Arrivals: Jessica entered Paradise. Abbie's Date: Ciarran. Rose Ceremony: Jake gave his rose to Cass; Timm gave Brittany his rose; Glenn gave his rose to Helena; Niranga gave his rose to Mary; Ciarran gave Jess his rose; and Jamie gave his rose to Brittney. Abbie and Janey did not receive roses and were sent home.
32	Episode 3	21 July 2020	Arrivals: Renee entered Paradise. Jake's Date: Helena.
33	Episode 4	22 July 2020	Arrivals: Alisha, Alex, Conor, Chris (Gilly) and Tim entered Paradise. Alisha's Date: Conor, Gilly and Tim. Date: Conor received a date card and chose to take Brittney, however Brittney fell ill before the date. Glenn and Alisha went on the date instead. Rose Ceremony: Alisha gave her rose to Glenn; Cass gave her rose to Niranga; Brittany gave Timm her rose; Renee gave her rose to Gilly; Jess gave Ciarran her rose; Helena gave Alex her rose; Mary gave her rose to Conor; and Brittney gave Jamie her rose. Tim did not receive a rose and was sent home. Departure: Jake quit during the rose ceremony, wanting to give his relationship with ex, Megan, another try.
34	Episode 5	26 July 2020	Arrivals: Keira and Kiki entered Paradise. Keira's Date: Conor.
35	Episode 6	27 July 2020	Kiki's Date: Ciarran. Conor's Date: Mary. Jessica's Date: Alex. Rose Ceremony: Timm could not be at the rose ceremony, so he gave Brittany a rose beforehand. Glenn gave his rose to Alisha; Conor gave Mary his rose; Gilly gave his rose to Renee; Ciarran gave his rose to Kiki; Jamie gave Brittney his rose; Niranga gave Cass his rose; and Alex gave his rose to Keira. Helena and Jess did not receive roses and were sent home.
36	Episode 7	28 July 2020	Arrivals: Jackson, Matt and Scot entered Paradise. Matt's Date: Renee.
37	Episode 8	29 July 2020	Niranga's Date: Cass. Rose Ceremony: Mary gave her rose to Conor; Brittany gave her rose to Timm; Alisha gave Glenn her rose; Renee gave her rose to Matt; Kiki gave Ciarran her rose; Keira gave her rose to Alex; Cass gave Jackson her rose; and Brittney gave her rose to Scot. Gilly, Jamie and Niranga did not receive roses and were sent home.
38	Episode 9	2 August 2020	Arrivals: Keely entered Paradise. Cass' Date: Jackson.
39	Episode 10	3 August 2020	Arrivals: Mia entered Paradise. Matt's Date: Renee. Rose Ceremony: Jackson gave his rose to Brittney; Ciarran gave Kiki his rose; Conor gave his rose to Mary; Glenn gave his rose to Alisha; Scot gave Mia his rose; Matt gave his rose to Renee; and Alex gave Keira his rose. Cass and Keely did not receive roses and were sent home. Departures: Timm and Brittany left Paradise to continue their relationship in the outside world.
40	Episode 11	4 August 2020	Departures: Keira and Alex split up and left Paradise.
41	Episode 12	4 August 2020	Departures: Brittney and Jackson left Paradise to continue getting to know each other on the outside. Rose Ceremony: Mary and Conor gave each other a rose; Alisha and Glenn gave each other a rose; Kiki and Ciarran gave each other a rose; and Renee and Matt gave each other a rose. Mia and Scott decided to leave Paradise together.
42	Episode 13	9 August 2020	Departures: Ciarran and Kiki decided to leave Paradise together instead of going to the commitment ceremony. Commitment Ceremony #1: Matt and Renee chose to stay together. Commitment Ceremony #2: Conor and Mary chose to stay together. Commitment Ceremony #3: Alisha and Glenn chose to stay together.

== Ratings ==
No.	Title	Air date	Timeslot	Overnight ratings		Consolidated ratings		Total viewers	Ref(s)
No.	Title	Air date	Timeslot	Viewers	Rank	Viewers	Rank	Total viewers	Ref(s)
1	Episode 1 — Launch	15 July 2020	Wednesday 7:30 pm	507,000	17	45,000	18	552,000	
2	Episode 2	16 July 2020	Thursday 7:30 pm	501,000	13	95,000	10	595,000	
3	Episode 3	21 July 2020	Tuesday 7:30 pm	494,000	16	68,000	16	562,000	
4	Episode 4	22 July 2020	Wednesday 7:30 pm	499,000	19	83,000	19	582,000	
5	Episode 5	26 July 2020	Sunday 7:30 pm	434,000	9	62,000	9	496,000	
6	Episode 6	27 July 2020	Monday 7:30 pm	517,000	16	48,000	16	565,000	
7	Episode 7	28 July 2020	Tuesday 7:30 pm	576,000	14	48,000	12	624,000	
8	Episode 8	29 July 2020	Wednesday 7:30 pm	600,000	10	54,000	9	654,000	
9	Episode 9	2 August 2020	Sunday 7:30 pm	488,000	10	40,000	10	527,000	
10	Episode 10	3 August 2020	Monday 7:30 pm	532,000	18	36,000	18	573,000	
11	Episode 11	4 August 2020	Tuesday 7:30 pm	521,000	15	38,000	15	558,000	
12	Episode 12	5 August 2020	Wednesday 7:30 pm	490,000	15	55,000	16	544,000	
13	Grand Finale Final Decision	9 August 2020	Sunday 7:30 pm	414,000 480,000	12 9	37,000 59,000	10 9	451,000 539,000	
