= McClelland College =

Location
- Frankston, Victoria; Australia
- Coordinates: 38°8′49″S 145°9′32″E

Information
- Type: Public, secondary school
- Enrollment: 800+
- Colours: deep purple, grey and teal
- Website: www.mcclellandcollege.vic.edu.au

McClelland College, is a secondary school in Karingal. The school resides in the suburb of Frankston located in Victoria, Australia. The school has received a lot of government funding for their research into new learning environments and for their new VCE centre.

Previously known as Karingal Park Secondary College, the school was created after a merger of two other secondary colleges in the same area, Karingal Secondary College (formerly Karingal High School) and Ballam Park Secondary College (formerly Ballam Park Technical College). Karingal High School was originally located in the Life Saving Club in Frankston, during the 1950s, before relocating to the suburb of Karingal.

In 2009 Karingal Park Secondary College changed its name to McClelland Secondary College, although it was also known as McClelland College by the community. This decision was taken by the staff of the school and the local council. This led to a change in the school's uniform, and the school's colours are now purple and grey.

== School uniforms ==
The school uniform was chosen by the College Council after a consultative process with the body. It has been described as conservative and distinctive, and originally included the option of a blazer, but this was not taken up by the majority. During summer months, in terms 1 and 4, girls wear a summer dress, grey socks, and black shoes, with a purple college jumper. Boys also wear grey socks and black shoes, and the purple college jumper, in combination with grey trousers or shorts and a white shirt. For winter dress, in terms 3, girls wear the white college shirt and either a grey skirt or trousers. Boys are permitted to wear trousers or shorts during winter, and must also wear a tie.

== Notable alumni ==
Name	Year	Information
Brihony Dawson	2001	Television presenter, singer and sports commentator known for The Challenge.
Dylan Roberton	2009	AFL Player who played for the Fremantle Football Club and the St Kilda Football Club.
Brooke Hogan	2010	Australia's Next Top Model contestant in 2013 and a current Model and TV Presenter.
Georgia Gourlay	2017	AFLW Player who played for the Collingwood Football Club.
Mikayla Williamson	2023	AFLW Player who currently plays for the Hawthorn Football Club.
