= The Bachelorette (Australian TV series) season 7 =

The Bachelorette
- Season 7
- Starring: Brooke Blurton
- Presented by: Osher Günsberg
- No. of contestants: 20
- Winner: Darvid Garayeli
- Runner-up: Jamie-Lee Dayz
- No. of episodes: 12

Release
- Original network: Network 10
- Original release: 20 October – 25 November 2021

Season chronology
- ← Previous; Season 6

The seventh season of The Bachelorette Australia premiered on Wednesday, 20 October 2021. In a world first, the season features Brooke Blurton, a 26-year-old social worker from Melbourne, Victoria, who is the first bisexual Bachelorette in The Bachelor franchise history, courting 10 men and 10 women. She is also Australia's first Indigenous lead. Brooke previously appeared on the sixth season of The Bachelor Australia, where she finished in third place; and the second season of Bachelor in Paradise Australia.

== Contestants ==
The first four contestants, Jamie-Lee, Darvid, Holly and Konrad, were revealed on social media prior to the full cast being revealed. Jamie-Lee was previously a contestant with Brooke in season 6 of The Bachelor. The season began with 16 contestants, who were revealed on 18 October 2021. In episode 4, Jessica, Luca, Millie and Will entered the competition as intruders, bringing the total number of contestants to 20.

| Name | Age | Hometown | Occupation | Eliminated |
|---|---|---|---|---|
| Darvid Garayeli | 27 | Brisbane, Queensland | Landscaper | Winner |
| Jamie-Lee Dayz | 30 | Sydney, New South Wales | Psychology Student | Runner-up |
| Holly Langford | 27 | Sydney, New South Wales | Marketing Administrator | Episode 11 |
| Konrad Bien-Stephens | 31 | Melbourne, Victoria | Carpenter | Episode 10 |
| Kurt Herzog | 29 | Castle Hill, New South Wales | Sports Mentor | Episode 9 |
| Millie Rubio | 22 | Sydney | Gym Manager | Episode 9 |
| Luca Fraraccio | 25 | Gold Coast, Queensland | P.E. Teacher | Episode 8 |
| Will Sadler | 31 | Adelaide, South Australia | Landscaper | Episode 8 |
| Steve Pliatsikas | 29 | Sydney, New South Wales | Podiatrist | Episode 7 |
| Taje Fowler | 23 | Sydney, New South Wales | Youth Worker | Episode 7 |
| Jessica Debono | 28 | Melbourne, Victoria | HR Consultant | Episode 6 |
| Ryan Carmichael | 29 | Sydney, New South Wales | Plumber | Episode 6 |
| Carissa Croft | 30 | Gold Coast, Queensland | Psychologist | Episode 5 (Quit) |
| Jess Franklin | 30 | Adelaide, South Australia | Software Sales Executive | Episode 4 |
| Matthew "Matt" Pottier | 31 | Brisbane, Queensland | Metal Fabricator | Episode 4 |
| Emily Bebbington | 25 | Sydney, New South Wales | Vet Receptionist | Episode 4 |
| Rebecca "Bec" Pressing | 30 | Melbourne, Victoria | Charity Officer | Episode 4 |
| Ritu Chhina | 25 | Melbourne, Victoria | Filmmaker | Episode 3 |
| Beau Tauwhara | 34 | Sydney, New South Wales | Photographer | Episode 2 |
| Johann Alessandrini | 27 | Sydney, New South Wales | Carpenter | Episode 1 |

== Call-Out Order ==
Brooke's call-out order
| # | Bachelors/ Bachelorettes | Episode | | | | | | | | | | | |
| # | Bachelors/ Bachelorettes | 1 | 2 | 3 | 4 | 5 (Note: The rose ceremony was cancelled after Carissa left during the cocktail party. Therefore, the remaining men and women are listed in alphabetical order.) | 6 | 7 | 8 | 9 | 10 | 11 (Note: Holly was eliminated during her single date. Therefore, the remaining men and women are listed in alphabetical order.) | 12 |
|---|---|---|---|---|---|---|---|---|---|---|---|---|---|
| 1 | Holly | Darvid | Darvid | Holly | Konrad | Luca | Jamie-Lee | Millie | Holly | Jamie-Lee | Darvid | Darvid | Darvid |
| 2 | Darvid | Holly | Holly | Emily | Carissa | Kurt | Millie | Holly | Kurt | Darvid | Jamie-Lee | Jamie-Lee | Jamie-Lee |
| 3 | Beau | Kurt | Konrad | Darvid | Kurt | Darvid | Holly | Darvid | Darvid | Holly | Holly | Holly | |
| 4 | Carissa | Carissa | Matt | Carissa | Luca | Holly | Konrad | Luca | Konrad | Konrad | Konrad | | |
| 5 | Konrad | Ritu | Ritu | Konrad | Millie | Jamie-Lee | Luca | Konrad | Jamie-Lee | Kurt; Millie | | | |
| 6 | Ryan | Taje | Kurt | Kurt | Holly | Jessica | Will | Kurt | Millie | Kurt; Millie | | | |
| 7 | Ritu | Beau | Taje | Bec | Darvid | Konrad | Taje | Will | Luca; Will | | | | |
| 8 | Taje | Konrad | Carissa | Matt | Steve | Millie | Steve | Jamie-Lee | Luca; Will | | | | |
| 9 | Kurt | Ryan | Emily | Steve | Ryan | Ryan | Kurt | Steve; Taje | | | | | |
| 10 | Matt | Bec | Steve | Ryan | Will | Steve | Darvid | Steve; Taje | | | | | |
| 11 | Jess | Matt | Jamie-Lee | Jamie-Lee | Jessica | Taje | Jessica; Ryan | | | | | | |
| 12 | Emily | Emily | Jess | Taje | Jamie-Lee | Will | Jessica; Ryan | | | | | | |
| 13 | Johann | Steve | Bec | Jess | Taje (Note: Taje was unable to attend the rose ceremony as she was feeling unwell; therefore, she received a rose prior to the rose ceremony.) | Carissa | | | | | | | |
| 14 | Bec | Jess | Ryan | Ritu | Jess; Matt; Emily; Bec | | | | | | | | |
| 15 | Steve | Jamie-Lee (Note: Jamie-Lee was unable to attend the rose ceremony as she was feeling unwell; however, Brooke had guaranteed her a rose.) | Beau | | Jess; Matt; Emily; Bec | | | | | | | | |
| 16 | Jamie-Lee | Johann | | | Jess; Matt; Emily; Bec | | | | | | | | |
| 17 | Millie | | | | Jess; Matt; Emily; Bec | | | | | | | | |
| 18 | Will | | | | | | | | | | | | |
| 19 | Jessica | | | | | | | | | | | | |
| 20 | Luca | | | | | | | | | | | | |

Colour Key

The contestant received the first impression rose, granting them the first single date.
The contestant received a rose during a date.
The contestant received a rose outside of a date or the rose ceremony.
The contestant was unable to attend the rose ceremony, but received a rose.
The contestant was eliminated outside the rose ceremony.
The contestant was eliminated.
The contestant quit the competition.
The contestant won the competition.

== Episodes ==
=== Episode 1 ===
Original airdate: 20 October 2021

| Event | Description |
|---|---|
| First Impression Rose | Darvid |
| Rose ceremony | Johann was eliminated. |

=== Episode 2 ===
Original airdate: 21 October 2021

| Event | Description |
|---|---|
| Group Date | Jamie-Lee, Beau, Matt, Bec, Ryan, Carissa, Kurt, Holly, Jess & Konrad |
| Single Date | Darvid |
| Rose ceremony | Beau was eliminated. |

=== Episode 3 ===
Original airdate: 27 October 2021

| Event | Description |
|---|---|
| Single Date | Holly |
| Group Date | Jess, Jamie-Lee, Bec, Emily, Ritu, Kurt, Konrad, Steve, Taje & Darvid |
| Rose ceremony | Ritu was eliminated. |

=== Episode 4 ===
Original airdate: 28 October 2021

| Event | Description |
|---|---|
| Single Date | Konrad |
| Group Date | Carissa, Jamie-Lee, Taje, Matt, Ryan, Kurt & Emily. |
| One-on-one time | Carissa |
| Intruders | Millie, Will, Jessica & Luca were introduced |
| Rose ceremony | Jess, Matt, Emily & Bec were eliminated. |

=== Episode 5 ===
Original airdate: 3 November 2021

| Event | Description |
|---|---|
| Single Date | Luca |
| Group Date | Darvid, Holly, Kurt, Steve, Jessica, Millie, Will & Luca |
| One-on-one time | Kurt |
| Rose ceremony | Carissa quit during the cocktail party. Brooke cancelled the rose ceremony. |

=== Episode 6 ===
Original airdate: 4 November 2021

| Event | Description |
|---|---|
| Single Date | Jamie-Lee |
| Group Date | Everyone |
| Rose ceremony | Jessica & Ryan were eliminated. |

=== Episode 7 ===
Original airdate: 10 November 2021

| Event | Description |
|---|---|
| Single Date | Millie |
| Group Date | Everyone |
| Rose ceremony | Steve & Taje were eliminated. |

=== Episode 8 ===
Original airdate: 17 November 2021

| Event | Description |
|---|---|
| Single Date | Holly |
| Group Date | Everyone |
| One-on-one time | Kurt |
| Rose ceremony | Luca & Will were eliminated. |

=== Episode 9 ===
Original airdate: 18 November 2021

| Event | Description |
|---|---|
| Group Date | Everyone |
| One-on-one time | Konrad |
| Single Date | Darvid |
| Rose ceremony | Kurt & Millie were eliminated. |

=== Episode 10 ===
Original airdate: 18 November 2021

| Event | Description |
|---|---|
| Hometown #1 | Konrad |
| Hometown #2 | Jamie-Lee |
| Hometown #3 | Darvid |
| Hometown #4 | Holly |
| Rose ceremony | Konrad was eliminated. |

=== Episode 11 ===
Original airdate: 24 November 2021

| Event | Description |
|---|---|
| Single Date #1 | Darvid |
| Single Date #2 | Jamie-Lee |
| Single Date #3 | Holly |
| Rose ceremony | Holly was eliminated on her single date |

=== Episode 12 ===
Original airdate: 25 November 2021

| Event | Description |
|---|---|
| Meet Brooke's Friends #1 | Darvid |
| Meet Brooke's Friends #2 | Jamie-Lee |
| Final Date #1 | Jamie-Lee |
| Final Date #2 | Darvid |
| Final Decision: | Darvid is the winner. |

== Ratings ==
| No. | Title | Air date | Timeslot | Overnight ratings | | Consolidated ratings | | Total viewers | Ref(s) |
| No. | Title | Air date | Timeslot | Viewers | Rank | Viewers | Rank | Total viewers | Ref(s) |
|---|---|---|---|---|---|---|---|---|---|
| 1 | Episode 1 | 20 October 2021 | Wednesday 7:30 pm | 397,000 | 14 | 453,000 | 13 | 754,000 | |
| 2 | Episode 2 | 21 October 2021 | Thursday 7:30 pm | 345,000 | 16 | 331,000 | 13 | 676,000 | |
| 3 | Episode 3 | 27 October 2021 | Wednesday 7:30 pm | 253,000 | 20 | 31,000 | 17 | 284,000 | |
| 4 | Episode 4 | 28 October 2021 | Thursday 7:30 pm | 314,000 | 18 | 44,000 | 4 | 358,000 | |
| 5 | Episode 5 | 3 November 2021 | Wednesday 7:30 pm | 288,000 | 24 | 43,000 | 6 | 331,000 | |
| 6 | Episode 6 | 4 November 2021 | Thursday 7:30 pm | 344,000 | 15 | —N/a | —N/a | 344,000 | |
| 7 | Episode 7 | 10 November 2021 | Wednesday 7:30 pm | 249,000 | 21 | —N/a | —N/a | 249,000 | |
| 8 | Episode 8 | 17 November 2021 | Wednesday 7:30 pm | 256,000 | —N/a | —N/a | —N/a | 256,000 | |
| 9 | Episode 9 | 18 November 2021 | Thursday 7:30 pm | 270,000 | —N/a | —N/a | —N/a | 270,000 | |
| 10 | Episode 10 | 24 November 2021 | Wednesday 7:30 pm | 332,000 | 18 | —N/a | —N/a | 332,000 | |
| 11 | Grand Finale Final Decision | 25 November 2021 | Thursday 7:30 pm Thursday 8:30 pm | 361,000 439,000 | 14 11 | | | | |
