= Brooke Blurton =

Indigenous Australian media personality

- Born: 1 January 1995 (age 31); Carnarvon, Western Australia
- Occupations: Media personality, author, podcaster, youth worker
- Years active: 2018–present
- Employer: Nova
- Known for: the Bachelor
- Television: The Bachelorette; The Challenge: Australia; Neighbours
- Movement: Indigenous Voice to Parliament; opposition to Australia Day
- Awards: Full list
- Website: www.rgm.com.au/entertainment/brooke-blurton/

Brooke Blurton (born 1 January 1995) is an Indigenous Australian media personality, author, podcaster and youth worker. She is best known as a participant in various editions of the reality television franchise the Bachelor, where she was a contestant on the sixth season of the Bachelor Australia and season two of Bachelor in Paradise Australia, and subsequently the franchise's first Indigenous and bisexual lead during the seventh Australian season of the Bachelorette.

== Early life ==
Blurton, a Noongar-Yamatji woman, was born on 1 January 1995, in Carnarvon, Western Australia, to a mother of Aboriginal and Malaysian descent and a father of English descent. Blurton's mother and grandmother both died when she was 11 years old. Blurton subsequently spent time in foster care, before living with her father during adolescence.

Blurton came out as bisexual to her family when she was 19.

== Career ==
=== 2018–2021: The Bachelor ===
Blurton made her debut television appearance in 2018 as one of 28 contestants on season 6 of the Bachelor Australia vying to win the attention of former professional rugby union footballer Nick Cummins. Blurton quit the competition in the fifteenth episode, finishing in third place. In 2019, Blurton appeared on season two of Bachelor in Paradise Australia. In 2021, Blurton was announced as the lead for season seven of the Bachelorette Australia; becoming the first Indigenous and bisexual lead in The Bachelor franchise to do so, with the series featuring both male and female contestants for the first time.

=== 2022–present: Television and media work ===
In 2022, Blurton was a contestant on the first season of reality competition series The Challenge: Australia. She also made a guest appearance as herself in an episode of soap opera Neighbours.

Since July 2022, Brooke has co-hosted Nova's Not So PG podcast with actor Matty Mills, which focuses on their experiences as members of the Indigenous and the LGBTQ+ communities. In October 2022, Blurton's memoir, Big Love: Reclaiming Myself, My People, My Country, was published. She has written two novels for young adult readers with Melanie Saward. The first, A Good Kind of Trouble, was published on 29 January 2025. It was shortlisted for the Ethel Turner Prize for Young People's Literature at the 2026 NSW Premier's Literary Awards. A sequel, Making Trouble, was published on 31 March 2026.

== Filmography ==
=== Television ===
List of on-screen appearances, with year, title, role, notes, and references shown
Year	Title	Role	Notes	Ref.
2018	The Bachelor Australia	Herself	15 episodes (season 6)	
2019	Bachelor in Paradise Australia	Herself	6 episodes (season 2)	
2021	The Bachelorette Australia	the Bachelorette	12 episodes (season 7)	
2022	The Challenge: Australia	Herself	9 episodes	
2022	Neighbours	Herself	Guest appearance	

=== Podcasts ===
List of podcast appearances, with year, title, role, notes, and references shown
Year	Title	Role	Notes	Ref.
2022–present	Not So PG	Host	With co-host Matty Mills	

== Bibliography ==
- Blurton, Brooke. Big Love: Reclaiming Myself, My People, My Country. HarperCollins. ISBN 978-1-4607-1453-9.
- Blurton, Brooke; Saward, Melanie (29 January 2025). A Good Kind of Trouble. HarperCollins. ISBN 978-1-4607-6149-6.
- Blurton, Brooke; Saward, Melanie (31 March 2026). Making Trouble (Volume 2). HarperCollins. ISBN 978-1-4607-6150-2.

== Personal life ==
Blurton dated Australian songwriter and musician G Flip throughout 2021.

She currently resides in Melbourne.

=== Political views ===
Blurton has advocated for the abolition of Australia Day, stating:

"It is a constant reminder of pain, a constant reminder of history, segregation, exclusion and brutality. How is that a celebration?"

She has also supported the Indigenous Voice to Parliament.

== Awards and nominations ==
=== New South Wales Premier's Literary Awards ===
New South Wales Premier's Literary Awards and nominations received by Brooke Blurton
Year	Nominee / work	Award	Result	Ref.
2026	A Good Kind of Trouble (with Melanie Saward)	Ethel Turner Prize for Young People's Literature	Shortlisted	
