= The Pick Up =

- Genre: Lifestyle
- Running time: 60 minutes
- Country of origin: Australia
- Language: English
- Home station: KIIS 106.5 Sydney
- Syndicates: KIIS 101.1 Melbourne; KIIS 97.3 Brisbane; Mix 102.3 Adelaide
- Hosted by: Brittany Hockley; Laura Byrne
- Produced by: Grace Garde
- Original release: September 2011 – December 2025
- Audio format: Stereo
- Website: The Pick Up

The Pick Up was an Australian drive radio show with Brittany Hockley and Laura Byrne. It was broadcast on the KIIS Network from 3pm to 4pm on weekdays. Daily podcasts were available for download from the show's website.

== History ==
In August 2011, ARN Media signed Chrissie Swan and Yumi Stynes to host a national drive show across the Mix Network aimed at women, primarily mothers in the 25 to 44 age demographic picking up children from school.

In April 2012, writer and comedian Wendy Harmer joined the show as a regular on Thursdays to discuss issues pertaining to women and families.

In August 2012, Yumi Stynes was appointed breakfast presenter with Mix 106.5 in Sydney and was replaced by Jane Hall.

In December 2014, Chrissie Swan left the show due to her contract not being renewed.

In January 2015, Katie 'Monty' Dimond and Zoe Marshall were announced as the new hosts of the 3PM Pick-Up. In December 2015, ARN Media announced that Meshel Laurie and Katie 'Monty' Dimond would host the show from January 2016.

In January 2017, ARN Media announced that Rebecca Judd and Yumi Stynes would host the show alongside Katie 'Monty' Dimond. Meshel Laurie has left the show to focus on Matt & Meshel and other media commitments.

In November 2020, ARN Media announced that Kate Langbroek would host the show and join Monty Dimond and Yumi Stynes from 27 January 2021, replacing Rebecca Judd who decided to take a break from media at the time.

In October 2022, ARN Media announced that the show would be cancelled and that Kate Langbroek, Monty Dimond and Yumi Stynes would leave the KIIS Network.

In January 2023, ARN Media announced the show would be rebranded to The Pick Up and would be hosted by Brittany Hockley and Laura Byrne.

At the end of 2025, Byrne and Hockley will move to Southern Cross Austereo and the show will no longer air on the KIIS Network.

At ARN's 2026 Upfronts, it was announced that Kent Small (Smallzy), will bring 'The Smallzy Show' to the 3-4PM time slot in 2026, on The KIIS Network.
