= Mali Hudson =

- Home and Away character
- Portrayed by: Kyle Shilling
- Duration: 2023–present
- First appearance: 11 January 2023
- Introduced by: Lucy Addario
In-universe information
- Occupation: Surfboard shaper Surfing instructor
- Mother: Victoria Hudson
- Brothers: Iluka Hudson
- Sisters: Elandra Hudson

Mali Hudson is a fictional character from the Australian television soap opera Home and Away, played by Kyle Shilling. The character made his first screen appearance during the episode broadcast on 11 January 2023. Shilling is the first Indigenous actor to portray a regular main character in the soap. He auditioned for other roles in Home and Away but was unsuccessful for those roles. Producers liked Shilling's auditions and created the role of Mali for him. Shilling hoped his casting would inspire young Aboriginal viewers to pursue acting careers. Mali is introduced into the series as friend of Dean Thompson (Patrick O'Connor) and works as a surfboard shaper in Dean's surfboard shop. Mali is characterised as cheeky, caring and family oriented. Mali's Indigenous culture has largely been written into his characterisation. The show hired an Indigenous cultural consultant to work with scriptwriters to ensure the representation of the culture was correct. Writers also introduced Mali's family during his tenure, consisting of his mother, Victoria Hudson (Ursula Yovich), his sister Elandra Hudson (Rarriwuy Hick) and brother, Iluka Hudson (Dion Williams).

Writers created a relationship storyline with Rose Delaney (Kirsty Marillier), who is a police officer. Her job is contentious to their dynamic because of the police mistrust that exists in the Indigenous community in Australia. Writers explored the issue in depth as the pair try to overcome their differences. Their relationship ultimately fails despite Shilling and Marillier both claiming the characters have "undeniable" chemistry. One of Mali's first notable storylines featured him being caught up in a bomb explosion. The accident results in Mali having a perforated eardrum and explores his coping mechanisms during his recovery. In 2024, writers used Mali's brother Iluka to include Mali in criminal themed stories. These were at odd's with his characterisation but writers navigated him through a feud with the Allen family. They hold Mali and his friends hostage, stab Levi Fowler (Tristan Gorey), severely assault Iluka and damage his friendship with Mackenzie Booth (Emily Weir). Mali then gets involved in gang violence in a revenge attack on the Allens. Writers placed the character through a brief period of self-reflection and Mali vows to never make the same mistakes again. They then explored his artistic talents via a story where he contemplates becoming a professional artist.

Mali has been well received by critics of the genre, with some claiming Shilling "made history" with the role and another branding it a "ground-breaking role". Mali has also been described as a "popular character", a "firm favourite" and a "fan favourite". Mali has also been noted by critics as being "happy-go-lucky" and "caring", so his role in the show's criminal stories has been deemed "uncharacteristic" of him.

== Casting ==
Actor and rapper Kyle Shilling was cast in the role of Mali and it was his first television role. Shilling had auditioned for other roles on Home and Away but failed to gain the roles. Shilling's first audition was a lead nurse role but casting directors did not think it suited him. Producers liked his "energy" and how he auditioned and decided to create a new character for Shilling to play. Shilling told Alice Penwill from Inside Soap that in his audition he was "cheeky, dropping a few jokes, having fun" and producers told him they wanted these characteristics for Mali. In May 2022, Shilling revealed that he had signed up to appear in an ongoing role in a "high profile" show, but could not reveal its identity. Shilling felt ill and nervous on his first day filming. He recalled arriving on-set with "head spins and a bad feeling" in his stomach. He became so anxious that half an hour before filming his first scenes he vomited four times. Shilling spent his first six months on-set filming in secrecy before his casting was publicised. Both the character and Shilling's casting details were announced on 5 December 2022 via Australian news websites. Confirming his casting via his Instagram account, Shilling revealed he was "stoked" to join the show, describing it as an "absolute privilege". He added that he could not wait for viewers to watch Mali's story.

Shilling is the first Indigenous actor to portray a regular main character in the soap. Home and Away also released a promotional photograph of Mali, depicting him with a surfboard complete with an Aboriginal design by artist Brentyn Lugnan. This conveyed that the character would be a keen surfer. Shilling is from the Wiyabal clan of the Bundjalung people. He hoped his casting would serve as inspiration to other Aboriginal viewers, especially the younger demographic who he hoped would be more inclined to pursue an acting career. He noted that when he grew up in the 1990s, there were no Aboriginal characters in Home and Away or television in general to relate to. He told Jessie Stoelwinder from PerthNow that had Mali been on television then, "I would have been more driven as a young person to want to better myself and explore acting." He added that "as Indigenous people, we are always categorised as athletes; there was never any other avenue I thought I could go down. When you feel like you’re stereotyped your whole life, that has a huge effect. Looking back on my 10-year-old self, if I had seen someone like Mali Hudson on such a big series, I would have wanted to be him." Upon winning the role, Shilling was told that the writers and producers wanted to develop his character around him and what he did in his audition. His character and storylines were developed alongside an Aboriginal script consultant, who also helped with the creative decisions for Mali and his introduction. Shilling made his first on-screen appearance as Mali during the episode broadcast on 11 January 2023.

== Development ==
=== Characterisation ===
"Mali has this solid line where he goes: 'When I see something I like, I go for it.' Mali doesn’t do things half hearted, he goes in guns blazing with everything – his career, his family, his friendships, possible relationships."

— Shilling on Mali's characterisation.

Shilling told Nadine Morton from The Canberra Times that Mali is characterised as being "fun, he's cheeky, he cares for his family". He later assessed that despite Mali's "fun" side, he can be an "annoying" character at times. He told Stuff's Kerry Harvey that "Mali is this positive person who loves his family and loves his culture." He told Rachel Lucas from Whattowatch.com "Mali’s a great, switched-on bloke" and that he would like writers to create him serious storylines.

In an interview with Emma Ruben (National Indigenous Times), Shilling delineated Mali as "family-oriented, loving, caring, cheeky, culturally driven." In an interview printed in Woman's Day, Shilling summed up Mali as "cheeky, fun and caring". He told Metro's Stephen Patterson that Mali is a "happy chappy and is a good bloke". He described him as family oriented because he is "always helping" and "taking care of" his family members. Shilling revealed that Mali is also driven when he wants to achieve something in his career, family or relationships. Mali enjoys teaching surfing because it is "everything that he wants to do: be in the ocean, be surfing, to work around surf equipment all day." Mali wears sleeveless tank tops in the show, including a Togati shirt designed by Shilling's brother Perry Langham.

Mali has been shown on-screen with facial hair. Shilling was diagnosed with Alopecia affecting his facial hair and the show's make-up department helped him cover it up for filming. Viewers noticed his facial hair loss and began commenting about it online and even trolled Shilling about Mali's appearance. This led Shilling to publicise his diagnosis and asked viewers to be mindful of the comments they make via social media.

As the show's first Aboriginal regular character, producers hired an Indigenous cultural consultant to work with scriptwriters to ensure the representation of the culture was correct. They originally offered Shilling the opportunity to help develop such stories, but he did not feel confident he could "navigate the wider population of Indigenous culture" alone. The entire production team ensure Shilling is comfortable with the particular stories they create for Mali, especially when "it is related through cultural reasoning or events." Shilling praised the show's efforts but noted it had taken too many years for them to incorporate the culture into the show via Mali's storylines. Shilling revealed that the cultural advisor had to be mindful of which particular groups of people he took information from. He noted that because there are varying Indigenous peoples across Australia, they needed to be careful not to incorrectly portray aspects of Mali's story. Writers portrayed Mali as being from the Bundjalung people and the cultural adviser tried to use traditions from those people in the character's scenes. He revealed that he received positive feedback from fellow Indigenous Australians and the general public who were interested in learning about the culture.

Shilling noted how Home and Away had successfully introduced cultural traditions for their Māori family, the Paratas. Shilling revealed that writers planned to introduce Mali's cultural background "slowly" but he was excited about the opportunity to explore it. He added that he anticipated writers exploring Mali's family and even introducing corroboree ceremony celebrations. In his first episode, Mali used the term "jarjum", meaning baby in Indigenous Bundjalung language. Shilling revealed that he received a positive reaction online from its use and described it as "great" the show included his language. One Aboriginal Australian tradition they used on-screen was a smoking ceremony that involves smouldering native plants to produce smoke. Shilling revealed that Ray Meagher who plays original character Alf Stewart was happy about the inclusion.

=== Introduction ===
To facilitate Mali's arrival in the show, the Seven Network aired a promotional trailer about Mali's initial stories. Shilling told Bridie Tanner from ABC North Coast that Mali is not labelled as anything upon his introduction and "he is there to make a difference in his own life". When the character was announced, it was alluded that Mali has a connection to an established character, which was later confirmed to be Dean Thompson (Patrick O'Connor). The pair are old friends and Shilling commented "you see their friendship blossom again after reconnecting on screen, its a great story." In his first scenes, it is established that Mali is a surfboard shaper, who helps design and build the surfboards for Dean's shop. Shilling told Inside Soap's Penwill that Mali had been referenced as the "mysterious surfboard-shaper" in previous episodes. Mali has been shaping the boards for Dean for "the past few years" but now viewers finally "put a name and face to him". Shilling stated that if he could have one item from any television character, it would be Mali's surfboard "because that thing is amazing."

Dean introduces Mali to his partner Ziggy Astoni (Sophie Dillman) and John Palmer (Shane Withington), who invites Mali to join the surf lifesaver team. Dean and Ziggy later realise that Mali has "a specific reason" for visiting the Bay, but he keeps it to himself. Shilling told Tanner that Mali comes into the show "as a helping hand" to Dean, but he eventually gets a "life changing option" of whether or not to stay in Summer Bay. Shilling likened the storyline to a "tug of war" in which it is unclear whether or not Mali will stay.

Dean asks Mali to run the surf board shop full-time because he wants to concentrate on parenthood. Shilling told Lucas that "Mali is very family-orientated" and it wants "to do right by" his family and his friends. The story gives Mali a reason to stay in Summer Bay and a permanent placement within the series. Mali later goes onto run the local surf board shop following Dean and Ziggy's departure. Shilling described the actors departures as "emotional". He added that O'Connor became his friend so "when his character offers me the board shop, there was such a sense of him also offering me this space now." Shilling believed that Mali had "big shoes to fill" by taking over the role of surf board shop from Dean.

=== Relationship with Rose Delaney ===
Writers paired Mali in a relationship storyline with Rose Delaney (Kirsty Marillier). Shilling recalled that filming the start of their romance was odd because Home and Away films scenes for episodes in a non-chronological order. He was filming Mali and Rose in a relationship on his third day on-set and the following day filming scenes where they had only just met. She is portrayed as a police officer in the series and it became a topical storyline exploring Indigenous community's relationship with the police. The duo first meet on the beach and decide to go on a date. Shilling told Inside Soap's Penwill that Mali is "intrigued" by Rose when he witnesses her with Xander Delaney (Luke Van Os). When he learns that Xander and Rose are siblings, he "sees an opening" and asks her out. Their date is successful but Mali later sees Rose in her police uniform and is shocked. Shilling revealed that Mali is unhappy about Rose's job and "Mali reveals that back home, they don't get along with the police. Mali's been through so much that he doesn't know how to trust her – its a tough one for him to navigate." He added that the story provided an example of the mistrust between the Indigenous community and the police in Australia. He added there is "a lot of police brutality so its a really important thing to show on screen." Shilling described Rose as a "stubborn" character and is "blunt" with Mali, explaining she does not want to date someone who misjudges her because of her job. He added "she tries to put forward her point to Mali that not all police officers are the same." Writers continued to develop their relationship despite their differences. Shilling stated that Mali figures out Rose's "blunt" persona and realises there is a "cheekiness" to her that he is attracted to. He believed that Mali's mutual "cheeky" personality created "a good balance between them".

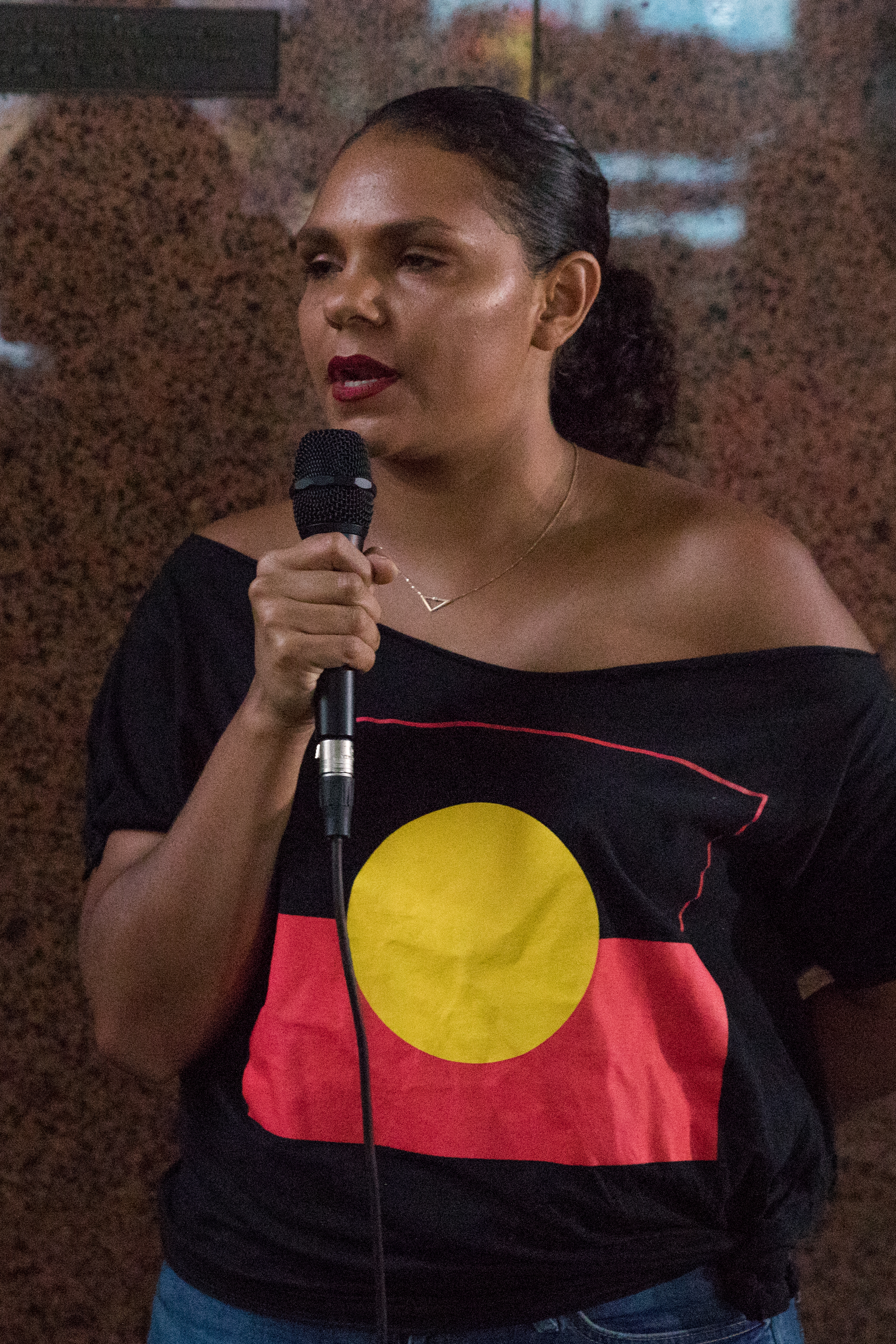
Rarriwuy Hick (pictured) was introduced as Mali's sister Elandra, who accuses him of leaving his home for a "fling" with Rose.

Rose decides to give Mali another chance and begins to understand his reasoning for mistrusting police. Marillier told Tamara Cullen from TV Week that "Rose is receptive to his feelings and makes him feel heard." She added that Rose likes Mali's confidence and finds him "very alluring". Rose went without romance following her break-up with Tex Wheeler (Lucas Linehan), a criminal who betrayed and humiliated her. Their initial date is successful and she dresses up to meet him at his caravan. The situation becomes passionate but Rose suddenly pulls away and flees the caravan. Marillier explained that Rose has trust issues because of Tex's betrayal. She added "on the most basic level, she's simply worried about getting hurt again." Rose decides to keep seeing Mali and Marillier explained "they enjoy each other's company - so much so, they can't keep away from each other, even if they try." She added Rose wants a "easy and fun" relationship, Mali is "an exact encapsulation of that" and they have "undeniable" chemistry.

Producers cast Rarriwuy Hick to play Mali's sister Elandra Hudson, the actress confirmed her casting by sharing a photograph of Mali and Elandra. When she arrives in Summer Bay, Elandra catches Mali and Rose in bed together at his caravan. She accuses Mali of leaving home for a fling. Writers Elandra to reveal that Mali had left home abruptly and moved to Summer Bay without explanation. She tells Rose that she wants Mali to return home with her but Rose defends him, noting that he has made a positive contribution to the community. Rose then realises she has developed feelings for Mali. After Elandra's departure, Shilling confirmed that she would return later in Mali's story.

Shilling told Daniel Kilkelly from Digital Spy that Mali and Rose were well matched but are "still discovering who each other are". He believed they had the potential to develop a "really beautiful" partnership and claimed it was difficult to imagine them not being together after filming so many scenes for their stories together. Shilling branded them an "awesome duo" and hoped they had a future as either lovers or friends. He could see them remaining friends after a break-up because they are both "mature enough as characters".

Writers planned a temporary break-up for Mali and Rose. This occurs when Mali argues with Rose about how she handles a police investigation into Xander's assault. After the explosion, Shilling wanted the characters to reunite because "this whole situation will show both of them who they really are afterwards", adding it would either "make or break their relationship". When they get back together, writers revisited the Aboriginal police mistrust story. This time they introduced Mali's mother Victoria Hudson (Ursula Yovich). Mali kept Rose a secret from Victoria but he decides to introduce them. They get along but Victoria and Elandra are shocked when they learn Rose is a police officer. Victoria tells Mali his father would be ashamed of him for being involved with the police.

Further relationship stories writers explored via them were trust issues. Mali confesses his love for Rose but quickly revokes it, leading Rose to confusion. She then plans a date at Mali's home but is shocked when the house has been trashed. A threatening message also reads "stay away from my wife", which leads Rose to suspect Mali is cheating on her. Rose goes into police mode and is determined to catch the culprit. She even takes Mali into police questioning which shocks him. Marillier revealed that Mali is "livid" with Rose, but defended her character because "Rose needs someone she can trust" and needs to know if he has cheated. She added that at this point in the story, Mali and Rose's chemistry is "undeniable". Xander offers advice into resolving their conflict and tries to make Mali see Rose is a "hothead" who jumps to conclusions. Other issues included Rose's envy of Mali and Kirby's strong connection to their Indigenous and Pacific cultures. Mali also interferes in Rose's family life, trying to unite her and her estranged biological father, Samuel Edwards (Bert La Bonté). His actions cause Rose to warn him not to involve himself in her family matters.

Producers later cast Matilda Brown as Zara Campbell and she was billed as a "blast from the past" for Mali. Her introduction created speculation with viewers online that she could ruin Mali and Rose's relationship. It was later revealed that Zara was Mali's promised wife from his childhood. Home and Away shared a spoiler video on their social media accounts warning that Zara could potentially "reignite an old flame" with Mali and indeed jeopardise his relationship with Rose.

In 2024, Rose's job in the police force continued to break-down their relationship. When Mali helps his friend, Tane Parata (Ethan Browne) hide after he kidnaps baby Maia and Rose is conflicted. She needs to apprehend Tane's accomplices even if that means arresting her own boyfriend. Writers permanently separated the characters later that year, following their continued disagreements about her job and trust issues.

=== Bomb explosion and injury ===
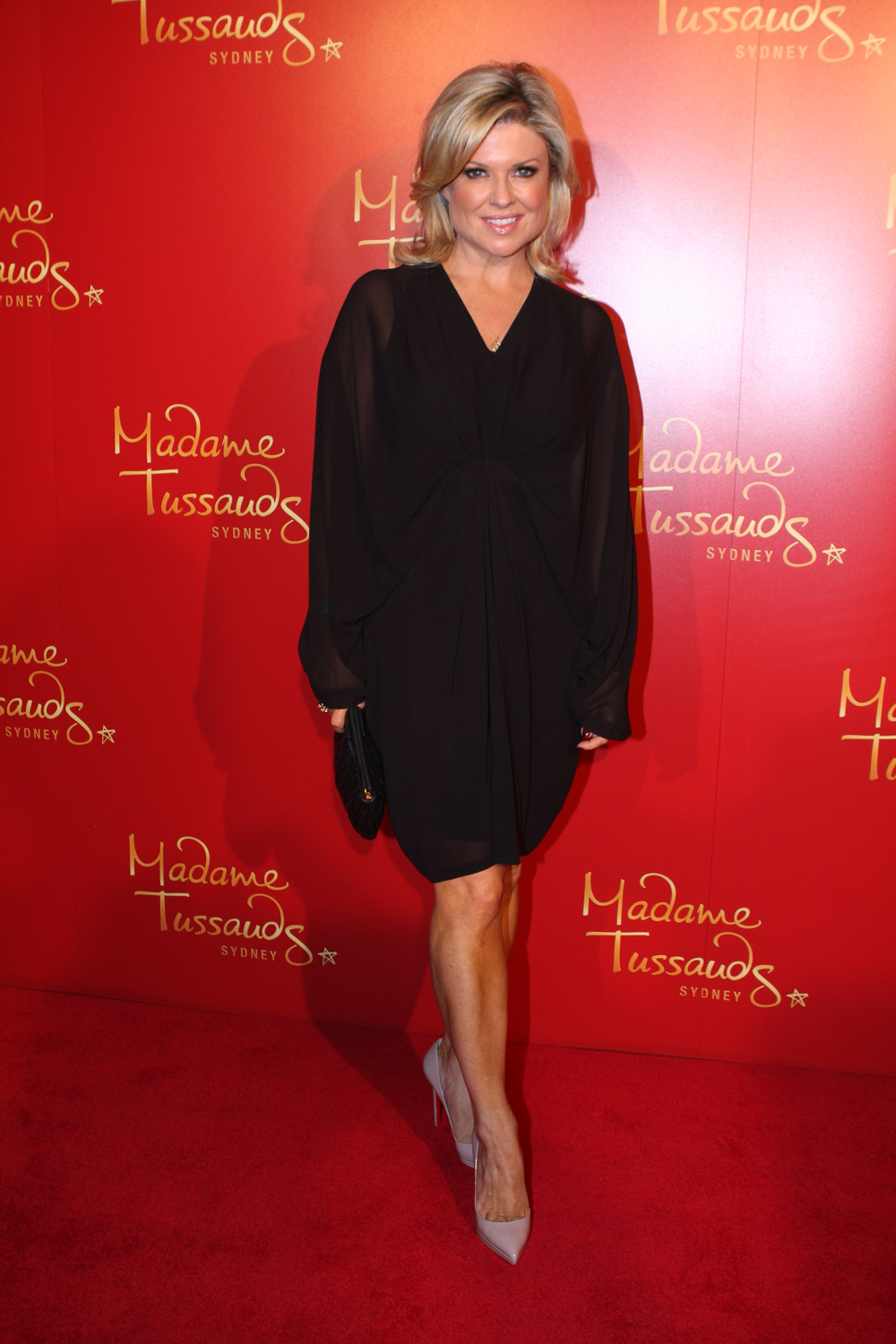
Mali gets caught up in a bomb explosion which was intended to kill Marilyn Chambers, played by Emily Symons (pictured).

In 2023, Mali was included in a dramatic storyline which featured him being injured in an explosion. The story was connected to the character, Marilyn Chambers (Emily Symons), who becomes a target of the cult business Stunning Organics. She has a dispute with them and they retaliate by sending Marilyn a bomb, which gets into several characters' possession and finally ends up in a car being driven by John and Roo Stewart (Georgie Parker). Mali discovers the threat and rushes to save John and Roo. The Seven Network released a promotional trailer featuring Mali being caught in the explosion, with the tagline "Home and Away's explosive week". In the UK, a promotional trailer suggested that the explosion would be fatal.

Shilling told Kilkelly that producers gave informed that he would be involved in the storyline six week before filming it. He believed the advance noticed helped him to better prepare, adding "it really helped me to execute the scene better." He was "excited" to prove himself as an actor in one of the show's big stories, adding that the stunt "was a lot of fun". Shilling revealed that Mali chases the car and then "sprints towards the danger zone". Shilling revealed that the production hired stunt double for actors not comfortable performing their own stunts. Shilling opted to perform his own stunts, but received advice from the doubles. Shilling explained that Mali puts himself in danger to protect John, who had formed an "unlikely friendship" with. Shilling explained that writers formed the friendship because Dean and Ziggy had been written out of the show and John needed support despite being reluctant to accept Mali's help. Shilling added "I love their relationship and it just gets more fun as time goes on." Shilling told Whattowatch's Lucas that Mali realises John is "needy" and in need of someone to talk to. He noted that once John let Mali in, "the friendship just bloomed from that day on." Shilling and Withington also created their own special handshake which writers featured on-screen between Mali and John. Shilling concluded that Mali is driven by "his appreciation to friends and family. He always talks about how important those relationships are", so Mali does not contemplate saving him, "because that's who he is".

He described to Lucas an "awesome atmosphere" during filming the stunt, recalling he was "in the elements, scurrying around open flame and feeling the heat from the fire." He described everyone present on set as being focused and "really switched on" because everyone could be affected had there been any errors. When the explosion occurs, Mali is injured by the blast and has a perforated eardrum. Shilling told Inside Soap's Sarah Ellis that Mali is in "a pretty bad state" post explosion. Writers depicted him as being in denial about his injury, as he tries to navigate life as he did before his injury. Shilling revealed to Kilkelly that "Mali is stubborn" throughout the story and refuses help from other characters. His perforated eardrum affects his balance which means he cannot teach surfing lessons and will result in financial income loss. He added that Mali goes on a "journey" in which "he wants to prove that he can do it himself. its a stressful time for Mali, but we do see friends step up for him."

=== Feud with the Allens ===
Writers explored a series of dramatic and violent stories for Mali in mid-2024. They were developed following the introduction of his brother, Iluka Hudson (Dion Williams). He was billed as a "bad boy" character and Mali's older brother, who arrives in town and begins romancing Kirby. Mali quickly tries to warn Kirby off and becomes suspicious of his brother's reasons for visiting. Hew soon discovers that Iluka is hiding from a dangerous family, the Allens, who Mali also knows personally.

The Allen siblings consist of Nat Allen (Claire Lovering), Gordie Allen (Brandon McClelland) and Campbell Allen (John Harding). They arrive in Summer Bay in search of Iluka and the money he has stolen from them. Nat and her brothers invade Mackenzie Booth's (Emily Weir) home, where Iluka is living. They hold Mali, Mackenzie and her boyfriend Levi Fowler (Tristan Gorey) hostage and demand that Iluka come home. Mali delays calling Iluka to protect him but violence ensues and Levi is stabbed. Mackenzie is then tasked with saving Levi's life as the Allens refuse to allow an ambulance to be called. Iluka eventually arrives and Nat reveals the grudge is also personal, revealing that Iluka was romantically involved with her. She continues to hold them hostage, making Levi's condition worse. The Allen's eventually take Iluka hostage and drives away.

The story was also used to reintroduce the criminal gang, The River Boys. Mali wants revenge against the Allen's for assaulting Iluka and leaving him for dead on a roadside. He gains help from Dean's friends, Rory Templeton (Joshua Orpin) and David 'Dingo' Lewis (JK Kazzi), who are from the River Boys. They meets with the Allens in a secluded street and face-off for a fight. Shilling told Wade Sellers from TV Week that "the only thing on Mali's mind is that he has to stick up for his family, he wants to show they’re not taking the situation lightly. He's willing to do anything for his brother." Nat pulls a knife out during the fight and the situation escalates. Shilling added that Mali does not back down because he has "really reached his breaking point, he's on the brink of seeing red. No-one knows the extent a person would go to while they're at that heightened point of anger." As the fight worsens, Rose arrives with police to break it up and make arrests. Elandra is later revealed to be the police informant, which shocks Mali. She is adamant that if she did not, Mali could have been killed in the fight.

Writers also explored the story's impact on Mali's friendship with Mackenzie. After Levi's stabbing she turns against Mali and blames him for Levi's stabbing. Mackenzie also evicts Iluka from her home, which worsens the rift between them. Mali issues Mackenzie an ultimatum that either she reconsider or he leaves too. Weir told Sellers that Mackenzie goes into "protection mode, for her, Levi and her household after the trauma." She noted that Mackenzie is unable to forgive Mali and Iluka because of "the gravity of the situation" which nearly killed her boyfriend. In the conclusion to the storyline, Iluka is written out of the show. Mali initially wants Iluka to work at the surfboard shop with him, but he later rejects Mali's offer. Iluka returns home with Elandra leaving Mali and Mackenzie able to forgive each other and move on. The plot also allowed writers to bring a permanent conclusion to Mali and Rose's relationship. Rose ends their relationship because Mali could not trust her regarding the Allens. Writers included scenes of self-reflection for Mali when he realises that he did not recognise his true self throughout the crime stories. Following more involvement with the River Boys, Mali visits his home town to gain a better perspective on the events. When he returns, writers portrayed Mali confident and determined not to repeat his past mistakes.

=== Art story ===
In 2024, writers created a new storyline for Mali exploring his artistic talents. They had previously portrayed his art via his designs on surfboards but when Mali paints a canvass, his friend Kirby Aramoana (Angelina Thomson) is impressed by his work and encourages him to enter an art competition. He is unsuccessful and tries to hide the outcome from Kirby. She later finds his returned painting with a letter of commendation and is confused why Mali is not proud. Kirby encourages Mali to frame the canvas and he reveals her support means more than winning. An art gallery owner and judge from the competition contacts Mali, wanting to display his work. Kirby and Rose try to convince Mali to explore the opportunity and he eventually explores the possibility of becoming an artist. When the gallery owner offers Mali full-time work and a large pay-out in exchange for fifteen paintings. After seeking advice from Alf, Mali turns down the offer.

== Reception ==
For his portrayal of Mali, Shilling received a nomination for the Rising Star accolade at the 2023 Digital Spy Reader Awards. Shauna Bannon Ward from RSVP Live opined that Shilling "made history when he joined Home and Away as the show's first indigenous main character." Stuff's Harvey branded Mali a "ground-breaking role". Shannon McGuire from National Indigenous Times praised the show for using an Aboriginal script consultant, stating it was "a vital part in the conception of Shilling's on-screen character and his storylines this will support positive Indigenous representation on screen." Emma Ruben from the publication branded Mali a "suave surfer". Tia Thomas writing for Now to Love stated "Mali quickly became a favourite among fans as he settled into town." Daily Mirror's Joe Crutchley also noted he "quickly become a firm favourite" with viewers. Seven News reporter Pip Christmass also agreed he "quickly become a Home and Away fan favourite".

In August 2023, Amy Jones from OK! noted that Mali had "already been at the heart of big storylines". She called him the show's "new hunk", adding that Mali "delighted fans with his addition" to the show. Digital Spy's Kilkelly branded the explosion plot as "huge scenes for Mali" and described his actions as "a heroic move in the show's big explosion storyline". He later branded Mali a "popular character" and his involvement in criminal stories "uncharacteristic". He added that Mali moving on from the ordeal as "a positive turning point" for the character. Whattowatch's Lucas branded Mali a "happy-go-lucky board shop manager" and the explosion story a "horrifying event that will leave the bay reeling." She also described Shilling's casting as "a landmark signing for Home and Away". Writing for Woman, Lucas branded him the show's new "new hunk-with-a-surfboard" character. TV Week's Cullen described "a gripping week" of episodes that featured the bomb explosion and called the stunt a "deadly" and "heart-stopping moment". She later opined that "Mali has charm, good looks and a way with the ladies."

Of Mali and Rose's doomed relationship, Scott Ellis from TV Week assessed that "from the moment they met, Rose's job has been an issue for Mali. There's no doubt they love each other, but he grew up in a world where breaking the law was no big deal - and she's a cop." Metro's Patterson assessed that Mali's "kindness and generosity proceeds him, though his selflessness comes with some inner turmoil, given that the Bay isn’t exactly close to where he typically resides." He added that Mali "has proven to be quite the hit" with other characters in the series. Inside Soap's Ellis defended Mali over a viewer complaint about his behaviour during the Rose and Zara story. She stated "at least Mali has finally done the right thing now, and Zara's gone."
