= Laura Byrne =

Australian radio host and podcaster

- Born: 26 March 1986 (age 40); Sydney, New South Wales, Australia
- Occupations: Radio host, podcaster, writer
- Years active: 2017–present
- Employer: KIIS Network
- Television: The Bachelor Australia; Dancing with the Stars Australia
- Spouse: Matty Johnson (m. 2022)
- Children: 3

Laura Byrne (born 26 March 1986) is an Australian radio host, business owner, podcaster and writer who was the winner of the fifth season of Network 10's The Bachelor Australia. She currently hosts the drive radio show The Pick Up on the KIIS Network alongside Brittany Hockley, and also co-hosts the Life Uncut Podcast with Hockley. Byrne is also the Founder and Designer of Australian Jewellery label ToniMay.

== Career ==
In 2017, Byrne first appeared on the fifth season of Network 10's The Bachelor Australia, where she was chosen as the winner.

In 2019, Byrne and Brittany Hockley hosted a podcast titled Life Uncut, which officially launched in July 2019. Following the success of the podcast, in November 2021 it was announced that Byrne and Hockley had been picked up by the KIIS Network to produce a radio show titled Life Uncut Radio Show, which would debut in 2022 as a part of the network's Saturday weekly lineup.

In 2022, Byrne and Hockley wrote and released a book together titled We Love Love.

In 2023, Byrne was announced as co-host of the revamped KIIS FM drive radio show The Pick Up alongside Hockley. Byrne competed in the twentieth season of Seven Network's Dancing with the Stars Australia, where she was partnered with Danil Saveliev. She was eliminated sixth from the contest. In 2026 Byrne and Hockley will move from the KIIS Network to Southern Cross Austereo.

== Personal life ==
Byrne met Matty Johnson, when they appeared together on The Bachelor Australia. They began a relationship after the show. In April 2019, Byrne and Johnson announced their engagement. Later that year on 20 June 2019, the couple had a daughter. Their second daughter was born on 4 February 2021. Byrne has also had two miscarriages in 2018 and 2020. Byrne and Johnson got married on 11 November 2022. Byrne and Johnson welcomed their third daughter in late September 2025.

== Appearances ==
Year	Title	Role	Notes
2017	The Bachelor Australia	Contestant	Winner
2023	Dancing with the Stars Australia	Contestant	Sixth eliminated
