= Brihony Dawson =

Australian singer, TV presenter, sports commentator (born 1984)

- Born: Brihony June Dawson; 1984 (age 41–42)
- Education: Ballarat Academy of Performing Arts
- Occupations: Television presenter; sports commentator; singer
- Years active: 2010–present
- Employer: Network 10
- Known for: Last Mistress; LadyHood
- Television: The Challenge Australia
- Spouse: Shae Dawson (née Wright) (m. 2020)
- Website: www.brihonydawson.com

Brihony June Dawson (born 1984) is an Australian television presenter, sports commentator and singer. In 2022, they were billed as the first non-binary presenter to front a major TV show in Australia, as well as the first non-binary host of The Challenge reality TV franchise.

== Early life ==
Dawson studied at Karingal Park Secondary College, graduating in 2001, and the Ballarat Academy of Performing Arts, graduating with a Bachelor of Theatre Production in 2004.

== Career ==
Dawson has toured extensively as a vocalist, including between 2011 and 2015 in the band Last Mistress, alongside fellow members Gabriel Atkinson on lead guitar, Ken Hennessy on bass guitar, Anthony Troiano on drums and Dean Williams on rhythm guitar. Since 2016, Dawson has been with the band LadyHood as a singer. They have played with acts such as Aerosmith, Guns N' Roses and Daryl Braithwaite.

Dawson was the host of the AFL Grand Final Preview Show on Channel 31 in 2020 and the on-ground host of the 2021 AFL Women's Grand Final. They also hosted Women's Footy on the Nine Network in 2022 and was the boundary rider for Fox Footy at women's AFL games. In November 2022, it was announced they would be co-hosting the 2022 W Awards alongside Sarah Jones.

Aside from covering the AFLW Grand Final, Dawson has also worked as a host of the Australian Grand Prix, the Sydney Gay and Lesbian Mardi Gras and The Women's Footy Show. In 2023, they were announced as the on-the-ground host for the ABC coverage of the Sydney WorldPride Opening Concert, which aired on 24 February 2023. Dawson was offered a role on The Challenge after a TV executive saw them hosting a sports function at the Melbourne Cricket Ground.

In August 2022, Dawson was announced as the host of Network 10's The Challenge: Australia, a local spin-off adaption of the long-running American reality show The Challenge, which was first broadcast in November 2022. They were widely reported as being the first non-binary presenter fronting a major Australian television series, (Note: Brihony Dawson themselves told Geelong Advertiser they were the "first non-binary host in Australia on a major TV network". Meanwhile, TV Week reported that Dawson was "the first ever non-binary host on primetime Australian TV".) as well as the first non-binary, non-male host of The Challenge TV franchise. Dawson has described The Challenge as "like Survivor meets Big Brother meets Ninja Warrior". After trying out various approaches as host, they decided with producer Stephen Tate against imitating the "ominous" style of U.S. host T. J. Lavin, and to "do the Brihony version" instead.

Dawson also co-hosted The Challenge: World Championship on Paramount+, alongside host T.J. Lavin and the hosts of the show's other international spin-offs: Mark Wright, from the United Kingdom, and Marley, from Argentina.

In 2023, they were announced as a member of the Australian jury for the 2023 Eurovision Song Contest.

== Personal life ==
Dawson married Shae Wright in March 2020. However the pair ended their relationship in 2022.

Dawson is now in a relationship with singer Karina Chavez.
