= Angie Kent =

Australian television personality and author (born 1990)

- Born: Angela Bernice Kent; 6 February 1990 (age 36); Sunshine Coast, Queensland, Australia
- Occupations: Television personality; social media personality; author; marketing assistant; production assistant; support worker
- Years active: 2015–present
- Known for: Gogglebox Australia; The Bachelorette Australia
- Notable work: Filmography
- Television: Space Invaders

Angela Bernice Kent (born 6 February 1990) is an Australian television personality, social media personality, and author, who is best known for appearing alongside Yvie Jones on Gogglebox Australia from 2015 to 2018.

Kent has since gone on to appear in various television shows, including as the Bachelorette on the fifth season of The Bachelorette Australia, on the fifth season of I'm a Celebrity...Get Me Out of Here!, on season 17 of Dancing with the Stars and Dancing with the Stars: All Stars, and Space Invaders.

== Early life ==
Angela Bernice Kent was born on 6 February 1990. She has a brother, Brad.

== Career ==
From 2015 to 2018, Kent featured alongside her friend Yvie Jones on Gogglebox Australia for 8 seasons. The pair departed the show together in December 2018; shortly after, they were announced as contestants on the fifth season of I'm a Celebrity...Get Me Out of Here!, which began airing on 13 January 2019. Kent was the 10th celebrity to be eliminated from the show.

In 2019, Kent starred in the fifth season of The Bachelorette Australia. On 27 February 2020, Kent released her debut book, If You Don't Laugh You'll Cry (ISBN 9780733643293).

== Filmography ==
List of on-screen appearances, with year, title, role, notes, and reference shown
Year	Title	Role	Notes	Ref.
2015–2018	Gogglebox Australia	Herself	68 episodes (alongside Yvie Jones)	
2019	I'm a Celebrity...Get Me Out of Here!	Herself	Contestant (season 5)	
2019	The Bachelorette Australia	Herself	The Bachelorette (season 5); 12 episodes	
2020	Dancing with the Stars	Herself	Contestant (season 17)	
2022	Dancing with the Stars: All Stars	Herself	Contestant (season 19)	
2023	Space Invaders	Herself	Host	

== Bibliography ==
- Kent, Angie (27 February 2020). If You Don't Laugh You'll Cry: Life and Love from Either Side of the TV Screen. Little, Brown Book Group. ISBN 978-0-7336-4329-3.
