= Space Invaders (TV series) =

- Presented by: Peter Walsh; Cherie Barber; Lucas Callaghan; Angie Kent
- Country of origin: Australia
- Original language: English
- No. of seasons: 6
- No. of episodes: 56

Production
- Running time: 60 mins (including ads)
- Production company: WTFN

Original release
- Network: Nine Network
- Release: 27 February 2021 – 18 April 2026

Space Invaders is an Australian lifestyle television program which first aired on the Nine Network on 27 February 2021. The series transforms the homes and lives of those who have found themselves in mess and clutter. The series first featured presenters Peter Walsh, Cherie Barber and Lucas Callaghan.

In May 2021, the series was renewed for a second season. The second season began airing on 19 February 2022. In August 2022, Lucas Callaghan was confirmed as not returning to the series third season and was replaced by Angie Kent. The third season premiered on 4 February 2023. A fourth season was announced in May 2023 and premiered on 3 February 2024. In May 2024, a casting call was announced for a fifth season. The fifth season premiered on 8 February 2025. In October 2025, the series was renewed for a sixth season and premiered on 28 February 2026. In April 2026, it was announced the series is being paused due to high costs.

== The Team ==
- Peter Walsh - Organisation and decluttering
- Cherie Barber - Renovations
- Angie Kent - Treasure hunting and upcycling (season 3–)
- Lucas Callaghan - Treasure hunting (season 1–2)

== Series overview ==
Season	Episodes	Originally released	
Season	Episodes	First released	Last released
1	10	22 February 2021	22 May 2021
2	10	19 February 2022	30 April 2022
3	10	4 February 2023	8 April 2023
4	10	3 February 2024	6 April 2024
5	8	8 February 2025	29 March 2025
6	8	28 February 2026	18 April 2026

== Episodes ==
=== Season One (2021) ===
No. overall	No. in season	Title	Original release date	Australia viewers
1	1	"Julie and Peter"	27 February 2021	403,000
2	2	"Liza and Fletcher"	6 March 2021	368,000
3	3	"Kashmira and Siddarth"	13 March 2021	307,000
4	4	"Jamie"	20 March 2021	348,000
5	5	"Sharon, Darren and Zara"	27 March 2021	351,000
6	6	"Faye and Maddison"	17 April 2021	228,000
7	7	"Bill and Fiona"	1 May 2021	294,000
8	8	"Harry and Anna"	8 May 2021	N/A
9	9	"Maria and Josie"	15 May 2021	N/A
10	10	"Arielle, Mark and family"	22 May 2021	N/A

=== Season Two (2022) ===
No. overall	No. in season	Title	Original release date	Australia viewers
11	1	"Lisa and Jason"	19 February 2022	314,000
12	2	"Carolyn"	26 February 2022	383,000
13	3	"Sally and Mark"	5 March 2022	385,000
14	4	"Gary and Neriezza"	19 March 2022	235,000
15	5	"Rob and Sharon"	26 March 2022	247,000
16	6	"Caroline and Adrian"	2 April 2022	256,000
17	7	"Steve and Maria"	9 April 2022	273,000
18	8	"Amara, Sokhem and Sokhey"	16 April 2022	282,000
19	9	"Dean"	23 April 2022	223,000
20	10	"Michelle and Denis"	30 April 2022	325,000

=== Season Three (2023) ===
No. overall	No. in season	Title	Original release date	Australia viewers
21	1	"Bec and Julian"	4 February 2023	278,000
22	2	"Jill"	11 February 2023	277,000
23	3	"Jo and Shayne"	18 February 2023	261,000
24	4	"Kim"	25 February 2023	285,000
25	5	"Luke and David"	4 March 2023	263,000
26	6	"Holly and Darren"	11 March 2023	310,000
27	7	"Silvana and Jose"	18 March 2023	259,000
28	8	"Nina and Dom"	25 March 2023	184,000
29	9	"Penny, Jaime and Carol"	1 April 2023	268,000
30	10	"Georgina and Nathan"	8 April 2023	276,000

=== Season Four (2024) ===
No. overall	No. in season	Title	Original release date	Australia viewers (National)
31	1	"Jo and Efrem"	3 February 2024	458,000
32	2	"Ben, Carla and Christine"	10 February 2024	412,000
33	3	"Karisha and Simon"	17 February 2024	456,000
34	4	"Sandra and Denise"	24 February 2024	N/A
35	5	"Kylie and Paul"	2 March 2024	486,000
36	6	"Kathy, Ruby and Ella"	9 March 2024	437,000
37	7	"Tracey and Stuart"	16 March 2024	451,000
38	8	"Favourite Families Special"	23 March 2024	424,000
39	9	"Garman and Ingrid"	30 March 2024	438,000
40	10	"Chris and Daniel"	6 April 2024	411,000

- On 28 January 2024, OzTAM's ratings data recording system changed. Viewership data will now focus on National Total ratings instead of providing data on the 5 metro centres and overnight shares, meaning from season 4 and beyond, only National total ratings will be added to episodes.

=== Season Five (2025) ===
No. overall	No. in season	Title	Original release date	Australia viewers (National)
41	1	"Steve and Megan"	8 February 2025	405,000
42	2	"Renata"	15 February 2025	N/A
43	3	"Maree and Bridget"	22 February 2025	417,000
44	4	"Jo, Monique and Jake"	1 March 2025	477,000
45	5	"Dianne and Sonia"	8 March 2025	482,000
46	6	"Melanie"	15 March 2025	259,000
47	7	"Leona"	22 March 2025	404,000
48	8	"Iliana"	29 March 2025	433,000

=== Season Six (2026) ===
No. overall	No. in season	Title	Original release date	Australia viewers (National)
49	1	"Val, Bill and Nicole"	28 February 2026	410,000
50	2	"Michael"	7 March 2026	406,000
51	3	"Rita & Yezeg"	14 March 2026	365,000
52	4	"Annie"	21 March 2026	391,000
53	5	"Marg & Chris"	28 March 2026	421,000
54	6	"Ange & Marlon"	4 April 2026	451,000
55	7	"Steve & Sarah"	11 April 2026	413,000
56	8	"Belinda & James"	18 April 2026	303,000

== See also ==
- Your Life on the Lawn
- List of Australian television series
