= Kyle Shilling =

Australian actor (born 1993)

- Born: 18 November 1993 (age 32); Taree, New South Wales, Australia
- Occupations: Actor, Rapper, Dancer
- Employer: Seven Network
- Known for: Home and Away

Kyle Shilling (born 18 November 1993) is an Australian actor, hip-hop musician and dancer best known for playing Mali Hudson on Seven Network's soap opera Home and Away since 2023. He is the show's first full time Indigenous Australian actor.

Kyle was crowned winner of Dancing With The Stars Australia 2025 with his professional dancer partner Lily Cornish.

Kyle is also known by his hip-hop artist name ‘BLACX’.

== Early life ==
Shilling is a Widjabul man of the Bundjalung Nation. He grew up in the towns of Taree and Pottsville in New South Wales. He has a twin brother.

Shilling started learning traditional Indigenous dance from the age of 10, and applied for the dance course at NAISDA Dance College while he was in high school. After a successful audition, he spent four years training in different dance styles such as contemporary, ballet, jazz and other cultural forms of dance. He graduated in 2018 with a Diploma in Professional Dance Performance.

== Dance career ==
Shilling began his professional career at Bangarra Dance Theatre which he joined in 2015. His first production was the company's Lore, before he toured Australia with the world premiere production of The Man with the Iron Neck (Legs on the Wall), followed by Sunshine Super Girl (Performing Lines) based on the life of tennis player Evonne Goolagong Cawley. Kyle also toured with Black Cockatoo for The Ensemble Theatre.

Shilling has performed at the Australian Dance Awards, and in Message Sticks at the Sydney Opera House, he also spent six weeks in Tennant Creek working with six communities to create a dance performance as part of the Desert Harmony Festival. Shilling has also collaborated with 2NDTOE on the educational piece Alice Can Dance in the Northern Territory, and he has worked with the community in Taree and Alice Springs as a choreographer and dance teacher.

Shilling is a hip hop and rap artist, known as BLACX. He has released several original tracks.

== Film and television ==
In 2017, Shilling appeared in the short film Hoax, which was shown at the Brisbane Short Film Festival and shortlisted for the Toronto International Film Festival.

In December 2022, it was announced Shilling had joined the cast of Home and Away after landing the role of surfer, Mali Hudson. Mali arrived in Summer Bay in January 2023 as a friend of River Boy, Dean Thompson, and has since gone on to run Manta Ray Boards the local surf school and board shop.

In February 2025, it was announced on Sunrise that Shilling would be a contestant on the twenty-second season of Dancing with the Stars Australia. He was partnered with Lily Cornish.

On 4 August 2025, the season wrapped and Shilling was announced as winner, defeating comedian Shaun Micallef.

== Filmography ==
Year	Title	Role	Notes
2017	Hoax	Eddie	Short film
2023–Present	Home and Away	Mali Hudson	Series Regular: 485+ Episodes
2025	Dancing with the Stars	Self	9 episodes
