= The Bachelorette (Australian TV series) season 5 =

The Bachelorette
- Season 5
- Starring: Angie Kent
- Presented by: Osher Günsberg
- No. of contestants: 21
- Winner: Carlin Sterritt
- Runner-up: Timm Hanly
- No. of episodes: 12

Release
- Original network: Network 10
- Original release: 9 October – 14 November 2019

Season chronology
- ← Previous; Season 4 Next → Season 6

The fifth season of The Bachelorette Australia premiered on Network 10 on Wednesday, 9 October 2019. The season features Angie Kent, a 29-year-old marketing and production assistant and former Gogglebox Australia star from Sydney, courting 21 men.

The first episode involved a twist with an undercover intruder, Angie's brother Brad Kent (under an anonymous name Mark), a personal trainer, entering the mansion to gain an insight into the other contestants.

== Contestants ==
Three contestants, Ciarran, Timm and Jamie, were revealed by Network 10 on social media prior to the full cast being revealed.

The season began with 20 contestants which were revealed on 6 October 2019. In episode 3, Ryan entered the competition as an intruder, bringing the total number of contestants to 21.

Name	Age	Hometown	Occupation	Eliminated
Carlin Sterritt	30	Sydney, New South Wales	Fitness Trainer/Actor	Winner
Timm Hanly	27	Melbourne, Victoria	Fireproofer	Runner-up
Ryan Anderson	32	Sydney, New South Wales	Rescue Dog Advocate	Episode 11
Jackson Garlick	25	Sydney, New South Wales	Sales Manager	Episode 10
Alex Mckay	26	Gold Coast, Queensland	Landscaper	Episode 9
Matt Whyatt	27	Gold Coast, Queensland	BMX Stunt Rider	Episode 9
Jamie Doran	39	Sydney, New South Wales	Firefighter	Episode 8
Ciarran Stott	25	Darwin, Northern Territory	Ex-Army Rifleman	Episode 7
Haydn Trick	32	Sydney, New South Wales	Firefighter/Carpenter	Episode 7
Glenn Smith	31	Perth, Western Australia	Refrigeration Mechanic	Episode 6
Adam Sellars	34	Sunshine Coast, Queensland	Freedive Instructor	Episode 5
Tom Bowdidge	31	Brisbane, Queensland	Cabin Crew	Episode 5
Scot Fuller	27	Byron Bay, New South Wales	Real Estate Agent	Episode 5
Jesse Owens	31	Perth, Western Australia	House and Land Specialist	Episode 4
Niranga Amarasinghe	28	Brisbane, Queensland	Aircraft Engineer	Episode 4
Kayde Wilkie	25	Perth, Western Australia	Luxury Car Sales Executive	Episode 3
Mitch Gould	31	Hervey Bay, Queensland	Plumber	Episode 3
Jess Glasgow	36	Noosa Heads, Queensland	Local Politician	Episode 2
Warwick Adams	36	Gold Coast, Queensland	Construction Supervisor	Episode 2
Josh Cox	37	Melbourne, Victoria	Mobile Zoo Owner	Episode 1
Oliver Bailey	25	New South Wales	Heating Technician	Episode 1

== Call-Out Order ==
Angie's call-out order
#	Bachelors	Episode											
#	Bachelors	1	2 (Note: The rose ceremony was cancelled after Jess was eliminated during the cocktail party. Therefore, the remaining men are listed in alphabetical order.)	3	4	5	6	7 (Note: Haydn was eliminated during the cocktail party. The episode ended without a rose ceremony, therefore the remaining men are listed in alphabetical order.)	8	9	10	11	12
1	Timm	Carlin	Carlin	Jackson	Timm	Ciarran	Ciarran	Jackson	Timm	Ryan	Ryan	Carlin	Carlin
2	Carlin	Matt	Adam	Ciarran	Ciarran	Ryan	Carlin	Carlin	Ryan	Carlin	Timm	Timm	Timm
3	Jamie	Jackson	Alex	Ryan	Haydn	Jamie	Ryan	Alex	Carlin	Timm	Carlin	Ryan	
4	Kayde	Niranga	Ciarran	Scot	Jackson	Alex	Timm	Jamie	Matt	Jackson	Jackson		
5	Matt	Haydn	Glenn	Carlin	Alex	Jackson	Haydn	Matt	Jackson	Matt; Alex			
6	Jessie	Tom	Haydn	Timm	Ryan	Haydn	Alex	Ryan	Alex	Matt; Alex			
7	Alex	Mitch	Jackson	Adam	Tom	Carlin	Jackson	Timm	Jamie				
8	Glenn	Warwick	Jamie	Matt	Scot	Matt	Matt	Haydn					
9	Josh	Jamie	Jesse	Jamie	Carlin	Timm	Jamie	Ciarran					
10	Oliver	Adam	Kayde	Alex	Adam	Glenn	Glenn						
11	Jackson	Alex	Matt	Glenn	Jamie	Adam; Tom; Scot							
12	Ciarran	Ciarran	Mitch	Niranga	Glenn	Adam; Tom; Scot							
13	Adam	Glenn	Niranga	Tom	Matt	Adam; Tom; Scot							
14	Tom	Scot	Scot	Jesse	Jesse; Niranga								
15	Niranga	Timm	Timm	Haydn	Jesse; Niranga								
16	Warwick	Jesse	Tom	Kayde; Mitch									
17	Scot	Kayde	Jess	Kayde; Mitch									
18	Mitch	Jess	Warwick										
19	Haydn	Josh; Oliver											
20	Jess	Josh; Oliver											
21	Ryan												

Colour Key

The contestant received the first impression "yellow rose", having the opportunity to spend 24 hours alone with Kent on the first date.
The contestant received a rose during a date.
The contestant received a rose during the rose ceremony or outside of a date.
The contestant was eliminated outside the rose ceremony.
The contestant was eliminated during a date.
The contestant was eliminated.
The contestant quit the competition.
The contestant won the competition.

== Episodes ==
=== Episode 1 ===
Original airdate: 9 October 2019

Event	Description
Yellow Rose	Carlin
Rose ceremony	Josh & Oliver were eliminated.

=== Episode 2 ===
Original airdate: 10 October 2019

Event	Description
Yellow Rose Date	Carlin
Group Date	Matt, Scot, Jackson, Jesse, Timm, Jess, Warwick, Jamie & Carlin.
Rose ceremony	Warwick quit before the cocktail party. Jess was eliminated during the cocktail party.

=== Episode 3 ===
Original airdate: 16 October 2019

Event	Description
Single Date	Jackson
Group Date	Ciarran, Scot, Alex, Glenn, Niranga, Haydn, Timm, Tom, Adam & Kayde
Intruder	Ryan
One-on-one time	Ciarran
Rose ceremony	Kayde & Mitch were eliminated.

=== Episode 4 ===
Original airdate: 17 October 2019

Event	Description
Group Date	Haydn, Ciarran, Ryan, Matt, Jesse, Niranga, Carlin, Jamie
Single Date	Timm
Rose ceremony	Jesse & Niranga were eliminated.

=== Episode 5 ===
Original airdate: 23 October 2019

Event	Description
Group Date	Adam, Jackson, Glenn, Alex, Scot, Tom, Ciarran & Timm
One-on-one time	Ciarran
Single Date	Ryan
Rose ceremony	Adam, Tom & Scot were eliminated.

=== Episode 6 ===
Original airdate: 24 October 2019

Event	Description
Single Date	Ciarran
Group Date	Everyone
Rose ceremony	Glenn was eliminated.

=== Episode 7 ===
Original airdate: 30 October 2019

Event	Description
Group Date	Everyone
One-on-one time	Jackson
Single Date	Carlin
Rose ceremony	Haydn was eliminated during the cocktail party. Ciarran quit during the cocktail party.

=== Episode 8 ===
Original airdate: 31 October 2019

Event	Description
Single Date	Timm
Rose ceremony	Jamie was eliminated.

=== Episode 9 ===
Original airdate: 6 November 2019

Event	Description
Group Date	Everyone
One-on-one time	Ryan
Rose ceremony	Matt & Alex were eliminated.

=== Episode 10 ===
Original airdate: 7 November 2019

Event	Description
Hometown #1	Terrigal, New South Wales – Timm
Hometown #2	Sharkies Beach, New South Wales – Ryan
Hometown #3	Sydney – Jackson
Hometown #4	Sydney – Carlin
Rose ceremony	Jackson was eliminated.

=== Episode 11 ===
Original airdate: 13 November 2019

Event	Description
Single Date #1	Timm
Single Date #2	Ryan
Single Date #3	Carlin
Rose ceremony	Ryan was eliminated.

=== Episode 12 ===
Original airdate: 14 November 2019

Event	Description
Meet Angie's Family #1	Timm
Meet Angie's Family #2	Carlin
Final Date #1	Carlin
Final Date #2	Timm
Final Decision:	Carlin is the winner.

== Ratings ==
No.	Title	Air date	Timeslot	Overnight ratings		Consolidated ratings		Total viewers	Ref(s)
No.	Title	Air date	Timeslot	Viewers	Rank	Viewers	Rank	Total viewers	Ref(s)
1	Episode 1	9 October 2019	Wednesday 7:30 pm	716,000	6	95,000	5	811,000	
2	Episode 2	10 October 2019	Thursday 7:30 pm	631,000	8	140,000	6	771,000	
3	Episode 3	16 October 2019	Wednesday 7:30 pm	667,000	8	89,000	7	757,000	
4	Episode 4	17 October 2019	Thursday 7:30 pm	694,000	6	144,000	4	842,000	
5	Episode 5	23 October 2019	Wednesday 7:30 pm	629,000	8	85,000	7	713,000	
6	Episode 6	24 October 2019	Thursday 7:30 pm	624,000	4	136,000	3	760,000	
7	Episode 7	30 October 2019	Wednesday 7:30 pm	593,000	7	69,000	8	669,000	
8	Episode 8	31 October 2019	Thursday 7:30 pm	642,000	5	105,000	4	749,000	
9	Episode 9	6 November 2019	Wednesday 7:30 pm	696,000	7	99,000	6	795,000	
10	Episode 10	7 November 2019	Thursday 7:30 pm	696,000	5	97,000	3	799,000	
11	Episode 11	13 November 2019	Wednesday 7:30 pm	829,000	3	52,000	3	881,000	
12	Grand Finale Final Decision	14 November 2019	Thursday 7:30 pm Thursday 8:40 pm	848,000 992,000	3 1	46,000 44,000	2 1	895,000 1,049,000	
