= The Bachelor (Australian TV series) season 6 =

The Bachelor
- Season 6
- Starring: Nick Cummins
- Presented by: Osher Günsberg
- No. of contestants: 28
- Winner: No winner
- Runners-up: Brittany Hockley; Sophie Tieman
- No. of episodes: 16

Release
- Original network: Network Ten
- Original release: 15 August – 4 October 2018

Season chronology
- ← Previous; Season 5 Next → Season 7

The sixth season of The Bachelor premiered on 15 August 2018. This season features Nick Cummins, a 30-year-old former professional rugby player from Sydney, courting 28 women.

== Contestants ==
The season began with 25 contestants. In episode 7, three "intruders" were brought into the competition, bringing the total number of contestants to 28.

| Name | Age | Hometown | Occupation | Eliminated |
|---|---|---|---|---|
| Brittany Hockley | 30 | Port Macquarie, New South Wales | Radiographer | Episode 16 |
| Sophie Tieman | 25 | Moreton Bay, Queensland | Property Valuer | Episode 16 |
| Brooke Blurton | 23 | Carnarvon, Western Australia | Youth Worker | Episode 15 (quit) |
| Cassandra "Cass" Wood | 23 | Sydney, New South Wales | Student | Episode 14 |
| Dasha Gaivoronski | 32 | Adelaide, South Australia | Personal Trainer | Episode 13 |
| Emily Dibden | 25 | Canberra, Australian Capital Territory | Dance Teacher | Episode 13 |
| Shannon Baff | 25 | Melbourne, Victoria | Car Care Consultant | Episode 12 |
| Jamie-Lee Dayz | 27 | Sydney, New South Wales | Venue Manager | Episode 11 |
| Tenille Favios | 25 | Brisbane, Queensland | Flight Attendant | Episode 10 (quit) |
| Deanna Salvemini | 28 | Adelaide, South Australia | Dental Nurse | Episode 9 |
| Romy Poulier | 30 | Brisbane, Queensland | Photo Shoot Director | Episode 8 (quit) |
| Alisha Aitken-Radburn | 25 | Canberra, Australian Capital Territory | Political Adviser | Episode 8 |
| Brittney Weldon | 25 | Gold Coast, Queensland | Housing Officer | Episode 8 |
| Cat Henesey-Smith | 24 | Brisbane, Queensland | Fashion Designer | Episode 8 |
| Ashlea Harvey | 30 | Gold Coast, Queensland | Property Consultant | Episode 7 |
| Rhiannon Doherty | 28 | Gold Coast, Queensland | Sales Representative | Episode 7 |
| Vanessa Sunshine | 27 | Melbourne, Victoria | Legal Secretary | Episode 6 |
| Blair Thomas | 27 | Gold Coast, Queensland | P.E. Teacher | Episode 5 |
| Aleksandra Sekuloska | 31 | Melbourne, Victoria | Yoga Teacher | Episode 4 |
| Steph Crothers | 23 | Melbourne, Victoria | Children's Entertainer | Episode 4 |
| Cayla Tudehope | 27 | Sunshine Coast, Queensland | Energy Healer | Episode 3 |
| Christina Karklis | 23 | Brisbane, Queensland | Retail Manager | Episode 3 |
| Kayla Gray | 25 | Mount Gambier, South Australia | Flight Attendant | Episode 3 |
| Juliana Bahr-Thomson | 29 | Sydney, New South Wales | Lifeguard | Episode 2 |
| Renee Cuzens | 30 | Melbourne, Victoria | Business Analyst | Episode 2 |
| Autumn Jay | 29 | Melbourne, Victoria | Digital Designer | Episode 1 |
| Susie McDougall | 30 | Perth, Western Australia | Account Manager | Episode 1 |
| Urszula Mosijewski | 34 | Melbourne, Victoria | Creative Director | Episode 1 |

== Call-out order ==
Nick's call-out order
| # | Bachelorettes | Episode | | | | | | | | | | | | | | | |
| # | Bachelorettes | 1 | 2 | 3 | 4 | 5 | 6 (Note: The rose ceremony took place during the group date. Therefore, the women not on the group date are listed in alphabetical order.) | 7 | 8 | 9 | 10 (Note: The rose ceremony was cancelled after Tenille decided to quit during the cocktail party. Therefore, the remaining women are listed in alphabetical order.) | 11 | 12 | 13 | 14 | 15 (Note: The rose ceremony was cancelled after Brooke decided to quit before the rose ceremony. Therefore, the remaining women are listed in alphabetical order.) | 16 |
|---|---|---|---|---|---|---|---|---|---|---|---|---|---|---|---|---|---|
| 1 | Shannon | Brooke | Shannon | Brittany | Dasha | Sophie | Rhiannon | Tenille | Emily | Brittany | Sophie | Cass | Brooke | Brittany | Brooke | Brittany | Brittany; Sophie |
| 2 | Brooke | Brittany | Romy | Brooke | Rhiannon | Tenille | Cass | Jamie-Lee | Brooke | Brooke | Brittany | Shannon | Sophie | Sophie | Sophie | Sophie | Brittany; Sophie |
| 3 | Brittany | Dasha | Rhiannon | Dasha | Tenille | Brittany | Brittany | Sophie | Sophie | Cass | Brooke | Brooke | Brittany | Cass | Brittany | Brooke | |
| 4 | Cayla | Kayla | Tenille | Sophie | Ashlea | Rhiannon | Alisha | Alisha | Shannon | Shannon | Cass | Brittany | Cass | Brooke | Cass | | |
| 5 | Cat | Rhiannon | Brittany | Ashlea | Sophie | Brooke | Shannon | Cat | Cass | Dasha | Dasha | Sophie | Emily | Dasha; Emily | | | |
| 6 | Tenille | Cat | Aleksandra | Vanessa | Shannon | Dasha | Romy | Brooke | Deanna | Sophie | Emily | Dasha | Dasha | Dasha; Emily | | | |
| 7 | Renee | Shannon | Cat | Emily | Alisha | Romy | Ashlea | Romy | Dasha | Emily | Jamie-Lee | Emily | Shannon | | | | |
| 8 | Kayla | Alisha | Alisha | Romy | Romy | Cass | Brooke | Cass | Brittany | Jamie-Lee | Shannon | Jamie-Lee | | | | | |
| 9 | Steph | Tenille | Brooke | Cass | Brooke | Shannon | Cat | Shannon | Tenille | Tenille | Tenille | | | | | | |
| 10 | Sophie | Sophie | Kayla | Rhiannon | Blair | Emily | Dasha | Brittany | Jamie-Lee | Deanna | | | | | | | |
| 11 | Cass | Aleksandra | Emily | Alisha | Brittany | Vanessa | Emily | Emily | Alisha; Brittney | | | | | | | | |
| 12 | Emily | Steph | Dasha | Cat | Emily | Ashlea | Sophie | Dasha | Alisha; Brittney | | | | | | | | |
| 13 | Ashlea | Cass | Vanessa | Tenille | Cat | Alisha | Tenille | Deanna | Romy | | | | | | | | |
| 14 | Christina | Renee | Cass | Blair | Vanessa | Cat | Vanessa | Brittney | Cat | | | | | | | | |
| 15 | Susie | Emily | Ashlea | Shannon | Cass | Blair | | Ashlea; Rhiannon | | | | | | | | | |
| 16 | Autumn | Ashlea | Steph | Steph | Aleksandra; Steph | | | Ashlea; Rhiannon | | | | | | | | | |
| 17 | Romy | Blair | Blair | Aleksandra | Aleksandra; Steph | | | | | | | | | | | | |
| 18 | Urszula | Juliana | Christina | Cayla; Christina; Kayla | | | | | | | | | | | | | |
| 19 | Juliana | Christina | Sophie | Cayla; Christina; Kayla | | | | | | | | | | | | | |
| 20 | Rhiannon | Cayla | Cayla | Cayla; Christina; Kayla | | | | | | | | | | | | | |
| 21 | Blair | Romy | Juliana; Renee | | | | | | | | | | | | | | |
| 22 | Alisha | Vanessa | Juliana; Renee | | | | | | | | | | | | | | |
| 23 | Aleksandra | Autumn; Susie; Urszula | | | | | | | | | | | | | | | |
| 24 | Dasha | Autumn; Susie; Urszula | | | | | | | | | | | | | | | |
| 25 | Vanessa | Autumn; Susie; Urszula | | | | | | | | | | | | | | | |
| 26 | Deanna | | | | | | | | | | | | | | | | |
| 27 | Jamie-Lee | | | | | | | | | | | | | | | | |
| 28 | Brittney | | | | | | | | | | | | | | | | |

The contestant received the key to Nick's bachelor pad.
The contestant received a rose during a date.
The contestant received a rose outside of a date or the rose ceremony.
The contestant was eliminated.
The contestant was eliminated during a date.
The contestant quit the competition.
The contestant was eliminated outside the rose ceremony.
The contestant won the competition.

== Episodes ==
=== Episode 1 ===
Original airdate: 15 August 2018

| Event | Description |
|---|---|
| Bachelor Pad Key | Brooke |
| Rose ceremony | Autumn, Susie & Urszula were eliminated. |

=== Episode 2 ===
Original airdate: 16 August 2018

| Event | Description |
|---|---|
| Single date | Shannon; Romy |
| Group date | Brooke, Aleksandra, Christina, Sophie, Cass, Cayla, Vanessa, Cat, Alisha and Romy |
| Rose ceremony | Juliana & Renee were eliminated |

=== Episode 3 ===
Original airdate: 22 August 2018

| Event | Description |
|---|---|
| Single date | Brittany |
| Group date | Everyone |
| One-on-one time | Vanessa |
| Bachelor Pad Key Date | Brooke |
| Rose ceremony | Cayla, Christina & Kayla were eliminated |

=== Episode 4 ===
Original airdate: 23 August 2018

| Event | Description |
|---|---|
| Single date | Dasha |
| Group date | Rhiannon, Tenille, Vanessa, Romy, Cat, Shannon, Brooke, Sophie, Brittany, Emily, Ashlea and Cass |
| One-on-one time | Cat |
| Rose ceremony | Aleksandra & Steph were eliminated |

=== Episode 5 ===
Original airdate: 29 August 2018

| Event | Description |
|---|---|
| Single date | Sophie |
| Group date | Everyone |
| One-on-one time | Brooke |
| Rose ceremony | Blair was eliminated |

=== Episode 6 ===
Original airdate: 30 August 2018

| Event | Description |
|---|---|
| Single date | Rhiannon |
| Group date | Brittany, Shannon, Cass, Alisha, Romy and Vanessa |
| Rose ceremony | Vanessa was eliminated |

=== Episode 7 ===
Original airdate: 5 September 2018

| Event | Description |
|---|---|
| Intruders | Deanna, Jamie-Lee and Brittney were introduced |
| Group date | Emily, Brooke, Cat, Ashlea, Alisha, Cass, Deanna, Jamie-Lee, Brittney W. |
| Single date | Tenille |
| Rose ceremony | Ashlea & Rhiannon were eliminated |

=== Episode 8 ===
Original airdate: 6 September 2018

| Event | Description |
|---|---|
| Group date | Cass, Cat, Brittany, Dasha, Emily, Tenille, Deanna and Brittney |
| One-on-one time | Emily |
| Single date | Brooke |
| Rose ceremony | Cat was eliminated outside the rose ceremony; Romy quit during the rose ceremony; Alisha & Brittney W. were eliminated during the rose ceremony. |

=== Episode 9 ===
Original airdate: 12 September 2018

| Event | Description |
|---|---|
| Single date | Brittany |
| Group date | Cass, Brooke, Tenille, Sophie, Deanna and Jamie-Lee |
| Rose ceremony | Deanna was eliminated |

=== Episode 10 ===
Original airdate: 13 September 2018

| Event | Description |
|---|---|
| Group date | Dasha, Sophie, Brittany and Brooke |
| One-on-one time | Sophie |
| Single date | Jamie-Lee |
| Rose ceremony | Tenille quit before the rose ceremony; the rose ceremony was cancelled. |

=== Episode 11 ===
Original airdate: 19 September 2018

| Event | Description |
|---|---|
| Single date | Cass |
| Group date | Everyone |
| One-on-one time | Dasha |
| Rose ceremony | Jamie-Lee was eliminated |

=== Episode 12 ===
Original airdate: 20 September 2018

| Event | Description |
|---|---|
| Group date | Everyone |
| One-on-one time | Brooke |
| Single date | Emily |
| Rose ceremony | Shannon was eliminated |

=== Episode 13 ===
Original airdate: 26 September 2018

| Event | Description |
|---|---|
| Group date | Everyone |
| One-on-one time | Brittany |
| Single date | Sophie |
| Rose ceremony | Dasha & Emily were eliminated |

=== Episode 14 ===
Original airdate: 27 September 2018

| Event | Description |
|---|---|
| Hometown #1 | Cass – Sydney |
| Hometown #2 | Brooke – Perth, Western Australia |
| Hometown #3 | Sophie – Moreton Bay, Queensland |
| Hometown #4 | Brittany – Port Macquarie, New South Wales |
| Rose ceremony | Cass was eliminated. |

=== Episode 15 ===
Original airdate: 3 October 2018

| Event | Description |
|---|---|
| Single Date #1 | Sophie |
| Single Date #2 | Brittany |
| Single Date #3 | Brooke |
| Rose ceremony | Brooke quit before the rose ceremony. |

=== Episode 16 ===
Original airdate: 4 October 2018
Location: New Caledonia

| Event | Description |
|---|---|
| Meet Nick's Family #1 | Brittany |
| Meet Nick's Family #2 | Sophie |
| Final Date #1 | Sophie |
| Final Date #2 | Brittany |
| Final Decision: | No one is the winner |

== Ratings ==
| No. | Title | Air date | Timeslot | Overnight ratings | | Consolidated ratings | | Total viewers | Ref(s) |
| No. | Title | Air date | Timeslot | Viewers | Rank | Viewers | Rank | Total viewers | Ref(s) |
|---|---|---|---|---|---|---|---|---|---|
| 1 | Episode 1 | 15 August 2018 | Wednesday 7:30 pm | 940,000 | 4 | 65,000 | 3 | 1,004,000 | |
| 2 | Episode 2 | 16 August 2018 | Thursday 7:30 pm | 822,000 | 5 | 113,000 | 3 | 935,000 | |
| 3 | Episode 3 | 22 August 2018 | Wednesday 7:30 pm | 819,000 | 6 | 81,000 | 6 | 902,000 | |
| 4 | Episode 4 | 23 August 2018 | Thursday 7:30 pm | 807,000 | 5 | 116,000 | 3 | 925,000 | |
| 5 | Episode 5 | 29 August 2018 | Wednesday 7:30 pm | 871,000 | 5 | 71,000 | 3 | 942,000 | |
| 6 | Episode 6 | 30 August 2018 | Thursday 7:30 pm | 820,000 | 5 | 116,000 | 2 | 941,000 | |
| 7 | Episode 7 | 5 September 2018 | Wednesday 7:30 pm | 805,000 | 7 | 74,000 | 6 | 880,000 | |
| 8 | Episode 8 | 6 September 2018 | Thursday 7:30 pm | 899,000 | 1 | 138,000 | 1 | 1,043,000 | |
| 9 | Episode 9 | 12 September 2018 | Wednesday 7:30 pm | 884,000 | 5 | 83,000 | 4 | 967,000 | |
| 10 | Episode 10 | 13 September 2018 | Thursday 7:30 pm | 869,000 | 4 | 101,000 | 1 | 975,000 | |
| 11 | Episode 11 | 19 September 2018 | Wednesday 7:30 pm | 854,000 | 6 | 63,000 | 5 | 919,000 | |
| 12 | Episode 12 | 20 September 2018 | Thursday 7:30 pm | 882,000 | 3 | 85,000 | 1 | 967,000 | |
| 13 | Episode 13 | 26 September 2018 | Wednesday 7:30 pm | 721,000 | 8 | 90,000 | 7 | 811,000 | |
| 14 | Episode 14 | 27 September 2018 | Thursday 7:30 pm | 835,000 | 3 | 151,000 | 1 | 986,000 | |
| 15 | Episode 15 | 3 October 2018 | Wednesday 7:30 pm | 822,000 | 6 | 46,000 | 6 | 868,000 | |
| 16 | Finale Final Decision | 4 October 2018 | Thursday 7:30 pm Thursday 9:00 pm | 1,009,000 1,241,000 | 2 1 | 64,000 87,000 | 2 1 | 1,073,000 1,328,000 | |
