= Dinesh Wicks =

Australian screen composer

- Born: Dinesh Wickremeratne; 26 November 1974 (age 51); Colombo, Sri Lanka
- Occupations: Composer, music entrepreneur
- Years active: 1992–present
- Known for: Cinematic scores
- Notable work: MasterChef, Shark Tank, Lego Masters, Sea Patrol, Holey Moley

Dinesh Wicks (born 26 November 1974) is an Australian composer, creative director and music entrepreneur. He is the co-founder of The D.A's Office, a music production and composition house specialising in music for screen.

Dinesh Wickremeratne was born in Colombo, Sri Lanka in 1974, moving to Australia with his parents in 1976 and residing in Sydney until relocating to Los Angeles in 2012.

Wicks is a featured composer on the scores for over 300 TV series, and together with his creative and business partner Adam Gock has won the APRA AMCOS Screen Music Award for 'Most Performed Composer – Australia' nine times (2022, 2021, 2020, 2019, 2018, 2017, 2015, 2012, 2011).

Wicks and Gock were recognised for their contribution to the Australian music industry in 2014 with the coveted APRA AMCOS International Achievement Award.

The D.A's Office also won the US ASCAP's Top Series Music Award in 2013 and 2014.

Wicks and Gock expanded the company to include US operations in 2012 and Wicks has since been based in Los Angeles, CA where he resides with his wife, dog rescue co-ordinator Nicky Wicks and their various dogs.

Wicks is also the co-founder of the ScoreMofo music library and music for branded content agency LAMP.

Some of Wicks' best known works are the musical scores for series Masterchef, Shark Tank, Lego Masters, Sea Patrol, Holey Moley, Love on the Spectrum, Hardball and Hell's Kitchen.

Wicks and Gock also write pop music under the moniker Cali Satellites with various guest vocalists.

== Filmography ==
=== Films ===
- The Final Winter (2007)

=== Television ===
- MasterChef Australia – Series 1–13 (International Title Music & Underscore)
- MasterChef Worldwide (Underscore)
- MasterChef USA (Underscore)
- Holey Moley – Series 1 & 2 (Theme & underscore)
- Holey Moley Australia – Series 1 (Theme & underscore)
- Last One Laughing (LOL) (Theme & underscore)
- Gogglebox Australia – Series 1-11 (Theme & underscore)
- Crikey! It's the Irwins – Series 1 & 2 (Theme & underscore)
- Crikey! It's the Irwins – Bindi's Wedding Special – (Theme & underscore)
- Love On The Spectrum – Series 1 & 2 (Theme & underscore)
- Lego Masters Australia Series 1-3 (Underscore)
- Lego Masters USA – (Underscore)
- Lego Masters Netherlands/Belgium/Sweden (Underscore)
- LEGO Monkie Kid (Underscore)
- Married At First Sight Australia – Series 8 (Underscore)
- Hardball – Series 1 & 2 (Theme & underscore)
- Ron Iddles: The Good Cop (Theme & underscore)
- Exposed: The Case of Keli Lane (Theme & underscore)
- Exposed: The Ghost Train Fire (Theme & underscore)
- Under Investigation – Series 1 (Theme & underscore)
- Kakadu (Theme & underscore)
- Wild Australia: After The Fires (Theme & underscore)
- Bear: Koala Hero (Theme & underscore)
- Junior MasterChef USA (Underscore)
- Junior MasterChef Australia – Series 1-3 (Underscore)
- Junior MasterChef Australia International Title Music
- My Kitchen Rules The Rivals – Series 11 (Underscore)
- Hell's Kitchen Australia (Underscore)
- Great Australian Bake Off – Season 4 & 5 (Underscore)
- Sea Patrol – Series 1–5 (Theme & underscore)
- The Biggest Loser Transformed (Underscore)
- The Biggest Loser USA – Series 17 (Underscore)
- The Biggest Loser Australia: Next Generation – Series 8 (Title Music Reworking Of “Time After Time”)
- The Biggest Loser Australia: Singles (Title Music Reworking Of “You Got The Love”)
- The Biggest Loser Australia: Families (Title Music Reworking Of “We Are Family”)
- The Biggest Loser UK (Reworking Of Title Music)
- The Chefs' Line Australia – Series 1 & 2 (Theme & underscore)
- The Chefs' Line Nederland – Series 2 (Theme & underscore)
- Shark Tank Australia – Series 1-4 (Underscore)
- Farmer Wants A Wife Australia – Series 5, 10 &11 (Underscore)
- The Apprentice Australia (Underscore)
- Seven Two It's Time
- Seven Network Australia (Promotional Music Theme)
- Minute To Win It Australia (Theme & underscore)
- Hughesy We Have A Problem – Series 3 & 4 (Theme & underscore)
- Travel Guides – Series 1-5 (Theme & underscore)
- Changing Rooms (Theme & underscore)
- 20 to One (Theme)
- Family Feud (Theme & underscore)
- All Star Family Feud (Theme & underscore)
- Outback Wrangler (Theme & underscore)
- Ten News Theme
- Network Ten (Title Music & Underscore)
- Iron Chef Australia (Underscore)
- Family Food Fight Series 1 & 2 (Underscore)
- Beauty & The Geek Australia 2013 (Series 5) (Underscore)
- Beauty & The Geek 2009 (International Title Music)
- Celebrity Apprentice (Underscore)
- Celebrity Apprentice Australia (Series 1–3) (Underscore & Theme)
- The Big Music Quiz (Theme & Gameplay music)
- The Big Music Quiz Nederland – Series 3 (Theme)
- The Big Music Quiz Poland (Theme)
- Aussie Inventions that Changed the World (Theme & underscore)
- Restoration Australia – Series 2 (Underscore)
- Escape the City (Theme)
- Sydney's Crazy Rich Asians (Theme & underscore)
- My 80 Year Old Flatmate (Underscore)
- How Australia Got It's MOJO (Titles remix)
- Marry Me Marry My Family – Series 1 & 2 (Theme & underscore)
- Date Night (Theme & underscore)
- Deadly Intelligence (aka Dead Scientists) (Theme)
- Making Child Prodigies (Theme & underscore)
- Outback (Theme & underscore)
- The Driving Test (Theme & underscore)
- The Employables (Theme & underscore)
- Trial by Kyle (Theme & underscore)
- Love It or List It (Theme)
- News of the Wild (Theme)
- Spelling Star UK (Underscore)
- Undressed (Theme & underscore)
- El Gran Reto Musical (Spain) (Theme & underscore)
- Ice Wars (Theme & underscore)
- Silent No More (Theme & underscore)
- This Time Next Year – Series 2 (Theme & underscore)
- Giving Life (Red Cross) (Theme)
- Murder Calls (Theme & underscore)
- Demolition Man (Theme & underscore)
- Testing teachers (Theme & underscore)
- The F Word (Underscore)
- Local Justice – (Theme & underscore)
- Most Extreme: Alien Planet (Underscore)
- Behave Yourself (Theme & underscore)
- Common Sense (Theme & underscore)
- This Time Next Year (Theme & underscore)
- According to Chrisley (Underscore)
- Teddies (Theme & underscore)
- Hiccup and Sneeze (Theme & underscore)
- Secret Life Of Pearls (Theme & underscore)
- You're Back in the Room (Theme & underscore)
- The Challenge – Rivals III (Underscore)
- Unreal Estate (Theme & underscore)
- Silvia's Italian Table (Theme)
- Ready For Take Off – Series 1 & 2 (Theme & underscore)
- The Great Australian Spelling Bee – Series 1 & 2 (Theme & underscore)
- Saltwater Heroes (Theme & underscore)
- Storm Season (Theme & underscore)
- Hot Plate (Underscore)
- Australia The Story Of Us (Underscore)
- Life After Sport (Theme & underscore)
- Manu: My France – Series 1 & 2 (Theme & underscore)
- Anh Does Italy (Theme & underscore)
- Anh Does Britain (Theme & underscore)
- Anh Does Brazil (Theme & underscore)
- Anh Does Scandinavia (Theme & underscore)
- Anh Does Vietnam (Theme & underscore)
- Anh's Brush with Fame – Season 1, 2, 3 & 4 (Theme & underscore)
- Faboriginal (Theme & underscore)
- The Observer Effect (Theme & Underscore)
- Tabatha Takes Over – Series 5 (Underscore)
- Wide World Of Sports NRL (Title Music)
- Class Of… (Theme & underscore)
- Bollywood Star (Theme & Underscore)
- Once Upon A Time In Cabramatta (Underscore)
- The Renovators Australia (Underscore)
- The Renovators Australia (International Title Music)
- Compass Factual (Title Music)
- Life's Big Questions Factual (Title Music)
- The One (Theme & underscore)
- The Suspects (Theme & underscore)
- The Boss Is Coming To Dinner (Theme & underscore)
- Dating In The Dark Australia (Underscore)
- Shintaro (Title & underscore)
- The Strip (Title Music & underscore)
- Wide World Of Sports Cricket Theme (Title Music Remix Featuring Lucius Borich (Cog) & Dj Mark Dynamix)
- Wide World Of Sports NRL & State Of Origin Theme (Title Music)
- Romeo & Juliet A Monkey's Tale (Theme & underscore)
- Kung Fu Monk (Co-Wrote with New York Hip Hop Legends “The Wu Tang Clan”)
- Speed Science (Theme & underscore)
- Speed Dynasties (Theme & underscore)
- Could It Happen Here (Theme & underscore)
- Tsunami Lines (Theme & underscore)
- The Resort (Theme & underscore)
- Firies (Theme & underscore)
- Who Gets To Stay in Australia (Underscore)
- Love & Other Mental Disorders (Theme & underscore)
- We Have Me (Theme & underscore)
