= APRA Music Awards of 2023 =

2023 Australian music award ceremony

- Date: 27 April 2023
- Location: International Convention Centre Sydney, Australia
- Website: apraamcos.com.au/awards/

The APRA Music Awards of 2023 were the 41st annual series, known as the APRA Awards. The awards are given in a series of categories in three divisions and in separate ceremonies throughout the year: the APRA Music Awards, Art Music Awards and Screen Music Awards. The APRA Music Awards are provided by APRA AMCOS (Australasian Performing Right Association and Australasian Mechanical Copyright Owners Society) and celebrate excellence in contemporary music, honouring songwriters and publishers that have achieved artistic excellence and outstanding success in their fields. In January, 20 songs shortlisted for Song of the Year were announced. On 30 March 2023, the final nominations were provided. Winners of the 2023 Ted Albert Award for Outstanding Services to Australian Music were Colin Hay and Colleen Ironside. APRA Music Awards were presented on 27 April 2023 at International Convention Centre Sydney.

Art Music Awards were distributed by APRA AMCOS together with Australian Music Centre (AMC) on 15 August 2023 at Carriageworks in Sydney, Gadigal land. Screen Music Awards are jointly presented by APRA AMCOS and Australian Guild of Screen Composers (AGSC) to "acknowledge excellence and innovation in the field of screen composition." The ceremony was held on 9 November 2023 at The Forum, Melbourne, Naarm land.

== APRA Music Awards ==
=== Ted Albert Award for Outstanding Services to Australian Music ===
- Colin Hay
- Colleen Ironside

=== APRA Song of the Year ===
Title and/or artist	Writer(s)	Publisher(s)	Result	Ref.
"I Feel Electric" by Daniel Johns featuring Moxie Raia	Daniel Johns, Laura Raia p.k.a. Moxie Raia, Maxwell Bidstrup, Mark Landon	BMG, Concord Music Publishing	Nominated	
"Lupa" by King Stingray	Yirrŋa Gotjiringu Yunupingu	Sony Music Publishing	Nominated	
"Lydia Wears a Cross" by Julia Jacklin	Julia Jacklin	Mushroom Music	Nominated	
"One Song" by Archie Roach	Archie Roach	Mushroom Music	Nominated	
"Say Nothing" by Flume featuring May-a	Harley Streten p.k.a. Flume, Sarah Aarons	Kobalt Music Publishing o.b.o. Future Classic, Sony Music Publishing	Won	

=== Breakthrough Songwriter of the Year ===
Writer(s)	Publisher(s)	Result	Ref.
18Yoman p.k.a. Vincent Goodyer	Universal/M.C.A. Music Publishing	Nominated	
Ashton Hardman-Le Cornu, Caleb Harper, Kieran Lama, Peppa Lane (Spacey Jane)	Kobalt Music Publishing o.b.o. Dew Process	Nominated	
Budjerah p.k.a. Budjerah Julum Slabb	Mushroom Music	Nominated	
Sampa the Great p.k.a. Sampa Tembo	Kobalt Music Publishing	Won	
Yirrŋa Yunupiŋu, Roy Kellaway (King Stingray)	Sony Music Publishing	Nominated	

=== Most Performed Australian Work ===
Title and/or artist	Writer(s)	Publisher(s)	Result	Ref.
"Clarity" by Vance Joy	Vance Joy p.k.a. James Keogh, Joel Little	Mushroom Music o.b.o. Unified, Sony Music Publishing	Nominated	
"Growing Up Is _____" by Ruel	Ruel p.k.a. Ruel Van Dijk, M-Phazes p.k.a. Mark Landon, Julian Bunetta	Universal Music Publishing, Concord Music Publishing*, Mushroom Music o.b.o. Hipgnosis	Nominated	
"Hurtless" by Dean Lewis	Dean Lewis, Jon Hume	Universal Music Publishing, Concord Music Publishing	Nominated	
"On My Knees" by Rüfüs Du Sol	Jonathon George, James Hunt, Tyrone Lindqvist, Jason Evigan	Kobalt Music Publishing, Sony Music Publishing	Nominated	
"Stay" by the Kid LAROI and Justin Bieber	The Kid Laroi p.k.a. Charlton Howard, Justin Bieber, Magnus Høiberg, Charlie Puth, Omer Fedi, Blake Slatkin, Michael Mule, Isaac De Boni	Sony Music Publishing, Universal/MCA Music Publishing, Warner Chappell Music, Kobalt Music Publishing, Concord Music Publishing	Won	

=== Most Performed Australian Work Overseas ===
Writer(s)	Publisher(s)	Result	Ref.
Toni Watson (p.k.a. Tones and I) for "Dance Monkey"	Kobalt Music Publishing, Warner Chappell Music Publishing	Won	

=== Most Performed Alternative Work ===
Title and/or artist	Writer(s)	Publisher(s)	Result	Ref.
"Apple Crumble" by Lime Cordiale and Idris Elba	Louis Leimbach, Oli Leimbach, Dave Hammer, Idris Elba	Universal Music Publishing, Kobalt Music Publishing	Nominated	
"Hurtless" by Dean Lewis	Dean Lewis, Jon Hume	Universal Music Publishing, Concord Music Publishing	Won	
"The Man Himself" by Gang of Youths	Dominik Borzestowski, Maxwell Dunn, Thomas Hobden, Jung Kim, David Le'aupepe	Universal Music Publishing	Nominated	
"Superstar" by Sycco	Sasha McLeod (p.k.a. Sycco)	Sony Music Publishing	Nominated	
"Touch Back Down" by Ocean Alley	Nicholas Blom, Baden Donegal, Lachlan Galbraith, Mitchell Galbraith, Angus Goodwin, Tom O'Brien	Warner Chappell Music	Nominated	

=== Most Performed Blues & Roots Work ===
Title and/or artist	Writer(s)	Publisher(s)	Result	Ref.
"I Believe" by Ziggy Alberts	Ziggy Alberts	Kobalt Music Publishing	Nominated	
"I Want You to Know" by Ash Grunwald	Ash Grunwald, Fergus James	Mushroom Music	Nominated	
"Livin' Like Kings" by the Black Sorrows	Joe Camilleri, Nicholas Smith	Mushroom Music, Jesharo Music	Nominated	
"My Heart Is in the Wrong Place" by Vika and Linda	Ben Salter	Universal Music Publishing	Nominated	
"We Deserve to Dream" by Xavier Rudd	Xavier Rudd	Sony Music Publishing	Won	

=== Most Performed Country Work ===
Title and/or artist	Writer(s)	Publisher(s)	Result	Ref.
"Get It Girl" by Taylor Moss	Taylor Moss, Michael Delorenzis, Michael Paynter, Alys Edwards	Mushroom Music	Nominated	
"God Took His Time on You" by Casey Barnes	Casey Barnes, Kaci Brown, Samuel Gray	Mushroom Music, Kobalt Music Publishing	Won	
"Good Beer" by Seaforth	Jordan Dozzi, Thomas Jordan, Mitchell Thompson, Rocky Block	Warner Chappell Music	Nominated	
"Love Is Real" by Morgan Evans	Morgan Evans, Parker Nohe, Jordan Reynolds	Warner Chappell Music	Nominated	
"Raised Like That" by James Johnston	James Johnston	—N/a	Nominated	

=== Most Performed Dance/Electronic Work ===
Title and/or artist	Writer(s)	Publisher(s)	Result	Ref.
"Heavy" by Flight Facilities featuring Your Smith	Hugo Gruzman, James Lyell, Jono Ma, Caroline Smith p.k.a. Your Smith	Kobalt Music Publishing o.b.o. Future Classic, Concord Music Publishing	Nominated	
"Honest" by Peking Duk featuring Slayyyter	Adam Hyde, Reuben Styles-Richards, Kristy Lee Peters, Catherine Garner p.k.a. Slayyyter	BMG	Nominated	
"On My Knees" by Rüfüs Du Sol	Jonathon George, James Hunt, Tyrone Lindqvist, Jason Evigan	Kobal Music Publishing, Sony Music Publishing	Won	
"Running Away" by Rumor	Mitchell Curley, Len Pearce	—N/a	Nominated	
"Say Nothing" by Flume featuring May-a	Harley Streten p.k.a. Flume, Sarah Aarons	Kobalt Music Publishing o.b.o. Future Classic, Sony Music Publishing	Nominated	

=== Most Performed Hip Hop / Rap Work ===
Title and/or artist	Writer(s)	Publisher(s)	Result	Ref.
"Let's Trot!" by Brothers and Joel Fletcher	Issam Ahmad, Bassam Ahmad, Joel Fletcher Allan p.k.a. Joel Fletcher	120 Publishing	Won	
"Not Sober" by the Kid LAROI featuring Polo G & Stunna Gambino	Charlton Howard p.k.a. The Kid LAROI, Khaled Rohaim, Isaias p.k.a. Garcia Stunna Gambino, Taurus Bartlett p.k.a. Polo G, Subhaan Rahman	Sony Music Publishing, Universal/MCA Music Publishing, Warner Chappell	Nominated	
"Show Business" by Hilltop Hoods featuring Eamon	Barry Francis (p.k.a. DJ Debris), Matthew Lambert (p.k.a. Suffa), Daniel Smith (p.k.a. MC Pressure), Andrew Burford	Sony Music Publishing, Universal Music Publishing	Nominated	
"Wicked" by Say True God?	Nixon Jackson	—N/a	Nominated	
"Wish You Well" by Baker Boy featuring Bernard Fanning	Danzal Baker p.k.a. Baker Boy, Bernard Fanning, Pip Norman	Universal Music Publishing, Mushroom Music	Nominated	

=== Most Performed Pop Work ===
Title and/or artist	Writer(s)	Publisher(s)	Result	Ref.
"Clarity" by Vance Joy	Vance Joy p.k.a. James Keogh, Joel Little	Mushroom Music o.b.o. Unified, Sony Music Publishing	Nominated	
"Complete Mess" by 5 Seconds of Summer	Michael Clifford, Luke Hemmings, Calum Hood, Ashton Irwin	Sony Music Publishing	Nominated	
"Glow by Jessica Mauboy	Jessica Mauboy, Jessica Higgs (p.k.a. George Maple), Cosmo Liney, Patrick Liney	Universal Music Publishing, Kobalt Music Publishing	Nominated	
"Growing Up Is _____" by Ruel	Ruel p.k.a. Ruel Van Dijk, M-Phazes p.k.a. Mark Landon, Julian Bunetta	Universal Music Publishing, Concord Music Publishing*, Mushroom Music o.b.o. Hipgnosis	Nominated	
"Stay" by the Kid LAROI and Justin Bieber	The Kid Laroi p.k.a. Charlton Howard, Justin Bieber, Magnus Høiberg, Charlie Puth, Omer Fedi, Blake Slatkin, Michael Mule, Isaac De Boni	Sony Music Publishing, Universal/MCA Music Publishing, Warner Chappell Music, Kobalt Music Publishing, Concord Music Publishing	Won	

=== Most Performed R&B / Soul Work ===
Title and/or artist	Writer(s)	Publisher(s)	Result	Ref.
"Bang My Line" by Cosmo's Midnight featuring Tkay Maidza	Cosmo Liney, Patrick Liney, Tkay Maidza, Brett Ramson	Kobalt Music Publishing, BMG	Nominated	
"Safety" by Becca Hatch	Becca Hatch, Hau Latukefu, Jamie Muscat, Willie Tafa, Solo Tohi	Sony Music Publishing	Nominated	
"Send My Love" by Jordan Rakei	Jordan Rakei, Imraan Paleker, Jonathan Harvey, Christopher Hyson, James Macrae	Sony Music Publishing	Nominated	
"Still Dream" by Miiesha	Miiesha Young, Lucy Blomkamp, Stephen Collins	Sony Music Publishing	Won	
"Tuesday" by Kye featuring Jerome Farah	Kylie Chirunga, Jerome Farah, Jacob Farah, Vincent Goodyer	Mushroom Music	Nominated	

=== Most Performed Rock Work ===
Title and/or artist	Writer(s)	Publisher(s)	Result	Ref.
"Around in Circles" by Jimmy Barnes	Jimmy Barne, Jane Barnes, Mark Lizotte	Sony Music Publishing, Mushroom Music	Nominated	
"Lunchtime" by Spacey Jane	Ashton Hardman-Le Cornu, Caleb Harper, Kieran Lama, Peppa Lane	Kobalt Music Publishing o.b.o. Dew Process	Nominated	
"Milkumana" by King Stingray	Roy Kellaway, Jerome Gotjirringu Yunupiŋu	Sony Music Publishing	Nominated	
"Rising Seas" by Midnight Oil	Jim Moginie	Sony Music Publishing	Nominated	
"Struck by Lightning" by the Chats	Matthew Boggis, Joshua Hardy, Eamon Sandwidth	Universal Music Publishing	Won	

=== Most Performed International Work ===
Title and/or artist	Writer(s)	Publisher(s)	Result	Ref.
"ABCDEFU" by Gayle	Taylor Rutherfurd p.k.a. Gayle, Sara Davis, David Pittenger	Universal/MCA Music Publishing, Peermusic, Downtown Music	Nominated	
"As It Was" by Harry Styles	Harry Styles, Thomas Hull, Tyler Johnson	Universal Music Publishing, Concord Music Publishing	Won	
"Easy on Me" by Adele	Adele Adkins p.k.a. Adele, Greg Kurstin	Universal Music Publishing, Sony Music Publishing	Nominated	
"Shivers" by Ed Sheeran	Ed Sheeran, Kal Lavelle, Steve Mac, Johnny McDaid	Sony Music Publishing, Universal Music Publishing	Nominated	
"That's What I Want" by Lil Nas X	Lil Nas X, Keegan Bach, Omer Fedi, Blake Slatkin, Ryan Tedder	Sony Music Publishing, Kobalt Music Publishing, Universal/MCA Music Publishing, Downtown Music	Nominated	

== Art Music Awards ==
=== Work of the Year: Chamber Music ===
Title	Composer / librettist	Performer	Result	Ref.
Pine Chant	Lachlan Skipworth	Sara Fraker, Jackie Glazier, Marissa Olegario, Lachlan Skipworth	Won	
Septet	Paul Dean	Paul Dean, Trish Dean, Imants Larsen, Peter Luff, David Mitchell, Phoebe Russell, Natsuko Yoshimoto	Nominated	
Sound Fields	Felicity Wilcox	Rubiks Collective	Nominated	
String Quartet No. 2	Jack Symonds	Australian String Quartet	Nominated	

=== Work of the Year: Choral ===
Title	Composer / librettist	Performer	Result	Ref.
Brought to Light: Symphony No. 5	Stuart Greenbaum	Cantori New York, Mark Shapiro (conductor)	Nominated	
Heavenly Father	Brooke Shelley	Sydney Chamber Choir, Sam Allchurch (conductor)	Nominated	
Swerve	Meta Cohen / Leona Cohen	Quartet Berlin-Tokyo, Theodor Schüz Ensemble, Philipp Amelung (artistic director)	Nominated	
Three Night Songs	Heather Percy	Sydney Chamber Choir, Sam Allchurch (conductor)	Won	

=== Work of the Year: Dramatic ===
Title	Composer / librettist	Performer	Result	Ref.
Panbe Zan	Shervin Mirzeinali	Maximillian Alduca, Majid Amani, Harry Birch, Danial Bozorgi, Arman Gouniaei, Ehsan Kachooei, Agnes Sarkis, Ali Yarmohammadi, Marjan Lotfali (director)	Won	
Precious Bedeviller AKA One Person Watching	May Lyon	Australian Ballet Bodytorque Ensemble	Nominated	
The Call	Connor D'Netto / Kate Miller-Heidke, Keir Nuttall	Ali McGregor, Queensland Symphony Orchestra, Zoe Zeniodi (conductor)	Nominated	
Watershed: The Death of Dr Duncan	Joe Twist / Christos Tsiolkas, Alana Valentine	Adelaide Chamber Singers and Chamber Orchestra, Christie Anderson (conductor)	Nominated	

=== Work of the Year: Electroacoustic/Sound Art ===
Title	Composer	Performer	Result	Ref.
Gaze Upon the Liquid Sky	Zinia Chan	Jasper Ly, Peter Dumsday	Nominated	
Mother	Mindy Meng Wang	Daniel Janestch, Anita Quayle, Mindy Meng Wang	Nominated	
Spirals	Rebecca Bracewell	Rebecca Bracewell	Won	
Tactable	Liam Mulligan	Liam Mulligan	Nominated	

=== Work of the Year: Jazz ===
Title	Composer	Performer	Result	Ref.
Busy/Quiet	Nat Bartsch	Nat Bartsch Quartet, Ellen Kirkwood, Loretta Palmeiro	Won	
Hill of Grace	Vanessa Perica	Australian National Jazz Orchestra Youth Big Band, Vanessa Perica (conductor)	Nominated	
Upon These Open Skins	Emily-Rose Sarkova	Emily-Rose and the Wild Things	Nominated	
Written in the Dark	Matthew Sheens	Matt Penmann, Kenneth Salters, Matthew Sheens, Hugh Stuckey	Nominated	

=== Work of the Year: Large Ensemble ===
Title	Composer	Performer	Result	Ref.
Annunciation Triptych	Liza Lim	Melbourne Symphony Orchestra, Michael Pisani (cor anglais), Nicholas Carter (conductor)	Nominated	
Concerto for Double Bass and Orchestra	Paul Dean	Phoebe Russell and Queensland Symphony Orchestra, Johannes Fritzsch (conductor)	Won	
Diapsalmata: Portrait of a Self	Kym Alexandra Dillon	Stephen Marsh, Kym Alexandra Dillon and Forest Collective, Elliott Gyger (conductor)	Nominated	
Release	Ella Macens	Sydney Symphony Orchestra, Simone Young (conductor)	Nominated	

=== Performance of the Year: Jazz / Improvised Music ===
Title	Composer	Performer	Result	Ref.
Barefaced	Sophie Min	Shamin (Benjamin Shanon, Sophie Min)	Nominated	
The Cloud Maker	Freya Schack-Arnott, Aviva Endean, Sunny Kim, Jasmin Wing-Yin Leung, Maria Moles, Te Kahureremoa Taumata	Freya Schack-Arnott, Aviva Endean, Sunny Kim, Jasmin Wing-Yin Leung, Maria Moles, Te Kahureremoa Taumata	Won	
Ritual Diamonds	Christopher Hale	Simon Barker, Theo Carbo, Christopher Hale, Andrea Keller, Woo Minyoung, Jamie Oehlers	Nominated	
When	Daniel Jenatsch, Anita Quayle, Mindy Meng Wang	Daniel Jenatsch, Anita Quayle, Mindy Meng Wang	Nominated	

=== Performance of the Year: Notated Composition ===
Title	Composer / librettist	Performer	Result	Ref.
Hey Hey It's Tuesday	Matthew Shlomowitz	Speak Percussion	Nominated	
Ligeia	Joe Chindamo	Colin Prichard, Adelaide Symphony Orchestra, Brad Cohen (conductor)	Nominated	
nyernur, nyarkur (to see, to hear)	Lou Bennett	Omega Ensemble and Lou Bennett	Won	
While You Sleep	Kate Neal	Jacob Abela, Phoebe Green, Isabel Hede, Zachary Johnston, David Moran	Nominated	

=== Award for Excellence in Music Education ===
Organisation / individual	Work	Result	Ref.
Australian National Academy of Music (ANAM)	ANAM Set Festival	Nominated	
Laura Andrew and Elizabeth Jigalin	Cobar High School's Sounds & Stories	Won	
Musica Viva Australia	Musica Viva Australia National Education Program	Nominated	
West Australian Youth Jazz Orchestra (WAYJO)	WAYJO 2022 Annual Pathways Programs	Nominated	

=== Award for Excellence in Experimental Music ===
Organisation / individual	Work	Result	Ref.
Aviva Endean	Stranger	Nominated	
Chamber Made	My Self in That Moment	Nominated	
Eve Klein	City Symphony	Won	
Lamorna Nightingale	BackStage Music	Nominated	

=== Richard Gill Award for Distinguished Services to Australian Music ===
Organisation / individual	Result	Ref.
William Barton	awarded	

=== Luminary Award: Individual (National) ===
Individual	Work	Result	Ref.
Roland Peelman	Sustained service to Australian music as a conductor, pianist, artistic director and mentor to composers, singers and instrumentalists	awarded	

=== Luminary Award: Organisation (National) ===
Organisation	Work	Result	Ref.
Moorambilla Voices	Long-term commitment to creating Australian art music with and for young people in regional NSW	awarded	

=== Luminary Award: State & Territory Awards ===
Organisation	Work	Result	Ref.
AJ America (Australian Capital Territory)	Leadership in the ACT	awarded	
SIMA (New South Wales)	Leadership through performance, artist development and education programs in Australian jazz	awarded	
Made Now Music (Queensland)	Made Now Music label and concert series	awarded	
Creative Original Music Adelaide (COMA) (South Australia)	COMA programs	awarded	
Julius Schwing (Tasmania)	Multiple album releases through his label Isthmus Music, touring and career development, and cultivating and fostering the Tasmanian improvised/experimental music scene	awarded	
Miranda Hill (Victoria)	Homophonic!	awarded	
Tone List (Western Australia)	Audible Edge Festival of Sound	awarded	

== Screen Music Awards ==
Nominees for Screen Music Awards were announced on 5 October 2023. The winners received their trophies in a ceremony held at The Forum, Melbourne (Naarm) on 9 November 2023.

=== Feature Film Score of the Year ===
Title	Composer	Result	Ref.
The Portable Door	Benjamin Speed	Won	
Talk to Me	Cornel Wilczek, Thomas Rouch	Nominated	
The Secret Kingdom	Chris Wright	Nominated	
The Survival of Kindness	Anna Liebzeit	Nominated	

=== Best Music for an Advertisement ===
Title	Composer	Result	Ref.
Coopers Beer: "Roll On"	Dan Higson, Nick West	Nominated	
NRMA Insurance: "Until Then – Duel"	Jeremy Richmond	Nominated	
Samsung Galaxy Earbuds	Lance Gurisik	Won	
The Voice on Air Promo	Reigan Derry, Graham Donald, Charlton Hill, Justin Shave	Nominated	

=== Best Music for Children's Programming ===
Title	Composer	Result	Ref.
Crazy Fun Park	Cornel Wilczek	Nominated	
"Dragon": Bluey	Joff Bush, Jazz D'Arcy, Daniel O'Brien	Nominated	
Ivy + Bean	Michael Yezerski	Won	
ScaryGirl	Ack Kinmonth	Nominated	

=== Best Music for a Documentary ===
Title	Composer	Result	Ref.
Flyways	Cezary Skubiszewski	Won	
Kindred	Caitlin Yeo, Damien Lane	Nominated	
The Australian Wars: "Episode 1"	Erkki Veltheim	Nominated	
The Black Hand	Jason Fernandez	Nominated	

=== Best Music for a Mini-Series or Telemovie ===
Title	Composer	Result	Ref.
The Clearing	Mark Bradshaw	Won	
Guillermo del Toro's Cabinet of Curiosities: Episode 5: "Pickman's Model"	Michael Yezerski	Nominated	
In Limbo	Matteo Zingales	Nominated	
Savage River	Bryony Marks	Nominated	

=== Best Music for a Short Film ===
Title	Composer	Result	Ref.
Black Canvas	Tony King	Nominated	
Mud Crab	James Mountain	Won	
My Bubble-Wrapped Exorcism	Alex Olijnyk, Moses Carr	Nominated	
Scorpion Ascent	Nir Tsfaty	Nominated	

=== Best Music for a Television Series or Serial ===
Series or Serial	Composer	Result	Ref.
Deadloch	Amanda Brown	Won	
Irreverent	David Hirschfelder, Samuel Hirschfelder	Nominated	
Last King of the Cross	David McCormack, Antony Partos	Nominated	
Safe Home	Helena Czajka	Nominated	

=== Best Original Song Composed for the Screen ===
Song title	Work	Composer	Result	Ref.
"Glow"	The Red Shoes: Next Step	Dominic Cabusi, Bronte Maree O'Neill	Nominated	
"Monos Lithos"	Monolith	Benjamin Speed, Leigh Marsh	Nominated	
"Rollercoaster"	Soundtrack to Our Teenage Zombie Apocalypse	Damien Lane, Jodi Phillis	Won	
"The Aeroplane"	Upright	Tim Minchin	Nominated	

=== Best Soundtrack Album ===
Title	Composer	Result	Ref.
Blueback	Nigel Westlake	Won	
Folau	Ned Beckley, 'Ofa Fotu, Joshua Hogan	Nominated	
Mud Crab	James Mountain	Nominated	
The Messenger	Bryony Marks	Nominated	

=== Best Television Theme ===
Title	Composer	Result	Ref.
Deadloch	Amanda Brown	Nominated	
Ivy + Bean	Michael Yezerski	Won	
The Clearing	Mark Bradshaw	Nominated	
The Messenger	Bryony Marks	Nominated	

=== Most Performed Screen Composer – Australia ===
Composer	Title(s)	Result	Ref.
Adam Gock, Dinesh Wicks	MasterChef Australia, Anh's Brush with Fame, Beauty and the Geek Australia	Won	
Jay Stewart	The Block, Better Homes and Gardens, House Rules	Nominated	
Mitch Stewart	MasterChef Australia, Travel Guides, Love on the Spectrum	Nominated	
Neil Sutherland	Border Security, MythBusters, Bondi Vet	Nominated	

=== Most Performed Screen Composer – Overseas ===
Composer	Title(s)	Result	Ref.
Adam Gock, Dinesh Wicks	MasterChef Australia, Lego Masters	Nominated	
Joff Bush	Bluey	Won	
Neil Sutherland	Border Security, MythBusters, Bondi Vet	Nominated	
Nick Cave, Warren Ellis	Dahmer, Peaky Blinders	Nominated	
