= Phoebe Russell =

Australian bassist

- Born: 1995 or 1996 (age 30–31)
- Genres: Classical
- Occupation: Musician
- Instrument: Double bass

Phoebe Russell is an Australian classical double bass player.

== Career ==
After studying piano in primary school, Russell studied at the Australian National Academy of Music in her home town of Melbourne. She moved to Berlin at the age of 17, studied at the Hochschule für Musik Hanns Eisler Berlin, made her debut in the double bass section of the Berlin Philharmonic, and graduated from the Karajan Academy there. She bought an Italian double bass made in Brescia in 1700 from her mentor and principal double bass of the Berlin Philharmonic, Klaus Stoll.

She has performed with leading orchestras and conductors in more than 20 countries around the world and in Australia, including as principal double bass in the Australian World Orchestra. She won the award for "Work of the Year: Large Ensemble" at the APRA Music Awards of 2023 for her recording of Paul Dean's Concerto for Double Bass and Orchestra with the Queensland Symphony Orchestra conducted by Johannes Fritzsch.

She returned to Australia when Alondra de la Parra was announced as the Queensland Symphony Orchestra's (QSO) musical director. Since 2017, she is the principal double bass player of the QSO and plays a double bass by Giovanni Maria Del Bussetto (1640–1681). She also teaches double bass at the Queensland Conservatorium of Music and gives classes at the Guildhall School of Music, London, the Melbourne and Sydney Conservatoriums of Music, the Australian National Academy of Music and at the Pontificia Universidad Javeriana, Bogotá, Colombia.

== Personal life ==
Russell is married to the Colombian-born composer Bernardo Alviz whom she met in London.
