= Ensemble Q =

Australian chamber music group

Ensemble Q is an Australian chamber music group (Q for Queensland) that was formed in 2017 by co-directors Paul Dean (clarinetist) and Trish Dean (cellist). They are professionally associated with the Queensland Performing Arts Centre, Queensland Conservatorium, and Musica Viva. Ensemble Q performs contemporary and classical works, but their deepest roots belong to 20th and 21st century music.

Ensemble Q has been very favorably reviewed in Australia, and enjoys a strong international presence on Facebook, Instagram, and YouTube.

== Discography ==
Album	Composer	Work
"Mahler 4".	Gustav Mahler, arr. Klaus Simon	Klaus Simon's arrangement for 15 piece chamber ensemble of Mahler's Symphony No 4. Live performance recording by Ensemble Q, led by Elizabeth Layton. Soprano Greta Bradman appears courtesy of Universal Music.
"Fantasy & Folksong".	Benjamin Britten	Phantasy for Oboe, violin, viola and cello.
	Luciano Berio	Folksongs, featuring mezzo soprano Lotte Betts-Dean
	Krzysztof Penderecki	Quartet for clarinet and string trio
"Ciaccona".	Osvaldo Golijov	Lullaby & Doina (from the film "The Man Who Cried")
	Guiseppe Colombi	Chiacona a Basso Solo
	William Walton	Passacaglia for Solo Cello
	Silvius Leopold Weiss	Ciacona, arranged for solo cello by Trish Dean
	Paul Dean	Chaconne for Solo Cello (in the time of Covid 19)
	Krzysztof Penderecki	Ciaccona in Memoriam Giovanni Paolo II, with Natsuko Yoshimoto, violin
	Sally Beamish	The Wise Maid
