= Adam Gock =

Australian composer and creative director

- Occupations: Businessman, composer
- Known for: Cinematic scores
- Notable work: Masterchef, Shark Tank, Lego Masters, Sea Patrol, Holey Moley
- Father: Les Gock

Adam Gock is an Australian businessman and composer. He is the co-founder of The D.A's Office, a music production and composition house specializing in music for screen.

== Career ==
Gock is a featured composer on the scores for over 300 TV series, and together with his creative and business partner Dinesh Wicks has won the APRA AMCOS Screen Music Award for 'Most Performed Composer – Australia' nine times (2022, 2021, 2020, 2019, 2018, 2017, 2015, 2012, 2011).

Gock and Wicks were recognized for their contribution to the Australian music industry in 2014 with the coveted APRA AMCOS International Achievement Award. Gock and Wicks expanded the company to include US operations in 2012 with offices in New York and Los Angeles. The D.A's Office also won the US ASCAP's Top Series Music Award in 2013 and 2014.

Gock is also the co-founder of the ScoreMofo music library and music for branded content agency LAMP. Some of Gock's best known works are the musical scores for series MasterChef, Shark Tank, Lego Masters, Sea Patrol, Holey Moley, Love on the Spectrum, Hardball and Hell's Kitchen. Gock and Wicks also write pop music under the moniker Cali Satellites with various guest vocalists.
