= Dating in the Dark =

Dutch reality show

- Original work: Daten In het Donker (The Netherlands)
- Owner: ITV Studios Netherlands
- Years: 2009–present

Dating in the Dark (Dutch: Daten in het Donker) is a reality show created in the Netherlands where 3 single men and 3 single women move into a light-tight house getting to know each other and form bonds in total darkness.

== Format ==
=== Dating ===
Three men and three women are sequestered in separate wings of the house, unable to have any conversation or contact with the opposite sex unless in the dark room. Initially, all six contestants have a group date in which they all sit at a table in the dark room exchanging names and getting to know one another's voices and personality types. After this date, each contestant can invite another contestant for a one-on-one date; these dates are also held in the dark room.

Throughout the show, the host provides the men and women with additional insights by providing personality profiles showing which contestants are their best matches and also allowing them to view items the others have brought to the house, such as items of clothing or luggage. Other episodes include sketch artists drawing contestants' impressions of each other.

After the one-on-one dates, each contestant can choose to invite another that they wish to see. The contestants enter the dark room for the final time and are revealed to each other one at a time. During the reveal process the couple must remain silent.

=== The Reveal Process ===
While being shown in the light, a contestant cannot see the other contestant's reaction. Each contestant is standing at opposite ends of the dark room with a very large two-way mirror between them. A color camera films from the dark side of the mirror while the other is illuminated on the other side. A separate infrared camera films the person on the dark side's reaction; the two images are combined in post-production. This is done, in part, by using video editing software to fade the infrared image of the person being revealed to black before they are illuminated, then seamlessly showing the color image of the person being revealed as it is faded in and out. During the reveal process the couple must remain silent.

=== The Balcony ===
The show culminates with each contestant choosing whether to meet another on the balcony of the house. The contestant will go to the balcony and wait for his or her prospective partner to join him or her. Joining the other on the balcony signifies that the contestants both want to pursue a relationship; exiting the house through the front door signifies that they do not want to pursue a relationship. Cameras are set up to show both the meeting balcony and the front door.

== International versions ==
Country	Name	Host(s)	TV station	Premiere	Finale
Australia	Dating in the Dark Australia	Laura Dundovic	FOX8	1 December 2010	29 May 2012
Brazil	Romance no Escuro	Eliana	SBT	29 June 2010	2 January 2011
Chile	La Pieza Oscura	José Miguel Viñuela	Mega	1 June 2011	
China	完美暗恋; Wanmei Anlian	Zhū Róng	Guangdong TV	27 August 2011	
Colombia	Cita a ciegas	Carolina Cruz	RCN	August 2010	
Finland	Treffit pimeässä	Susanna Laine	Sub	24 December 2010	
France	L'amour est aveugle	Arnaud Lemaire	TF1	16 April 2010	
Germany	Dating im Dunkeln		RTL	21 November 2010	
India	MTV Dating in the Dark	Nora Fatehi	MTV India	8 June 2018	31 August 2018
Israel	דייט בחשיכה; Date BaHashekha	Yaron Brovinsky	Reshet	13 October 2012	
Italy	Appuntamento al buio		Sky Uno	May 2011	
Netherlands	Daten In het Donker	Renate Verbaan	RTL 5	6 April 2009	present
Netherlands	Daten In het Donker	Gigi Ravelli	RTL 5	6 April 2009	present
Norway	Dating i mørket		NRK3	12 January 2011	
Romania	Intalnire pe intuneric	Andreea Raicu	Prima TV	4 August 2010	
Serbia	Sami u tami	Nikolina Pišek	Prva Srpska Televizija	9 April 2013	
Slovenia	Zmenek na slepo	Jasna Kuljaj	Planet TV	Spring 2014	
Sweden	Dating in the Dark		kanal 5	2 March 2010	
Turkey	Aşkın Gözü Kördür		Kanal D	4 June 2009	
Ukraine	Побачення у темряві		Inter	16 February 2011	30 March 2011
United Kingdom	Dating in the Dark	Scott Mills	Sky Living	9 September 2009	5 July 2011
United Kingdom	Dating in the Dark	Sarah Harding	Sky Living	9 September 2009	5 July 2011
United Kingdom	Dating in the Dark	Mathew Horne	ITV2	15 September 2016	20 October 2016
United States	Dating in the Dark	Rossi Morreale	ABC	20 July 2009	13 September 2010
