= Sam Frost (actress) =

Australian actress (born 1989)

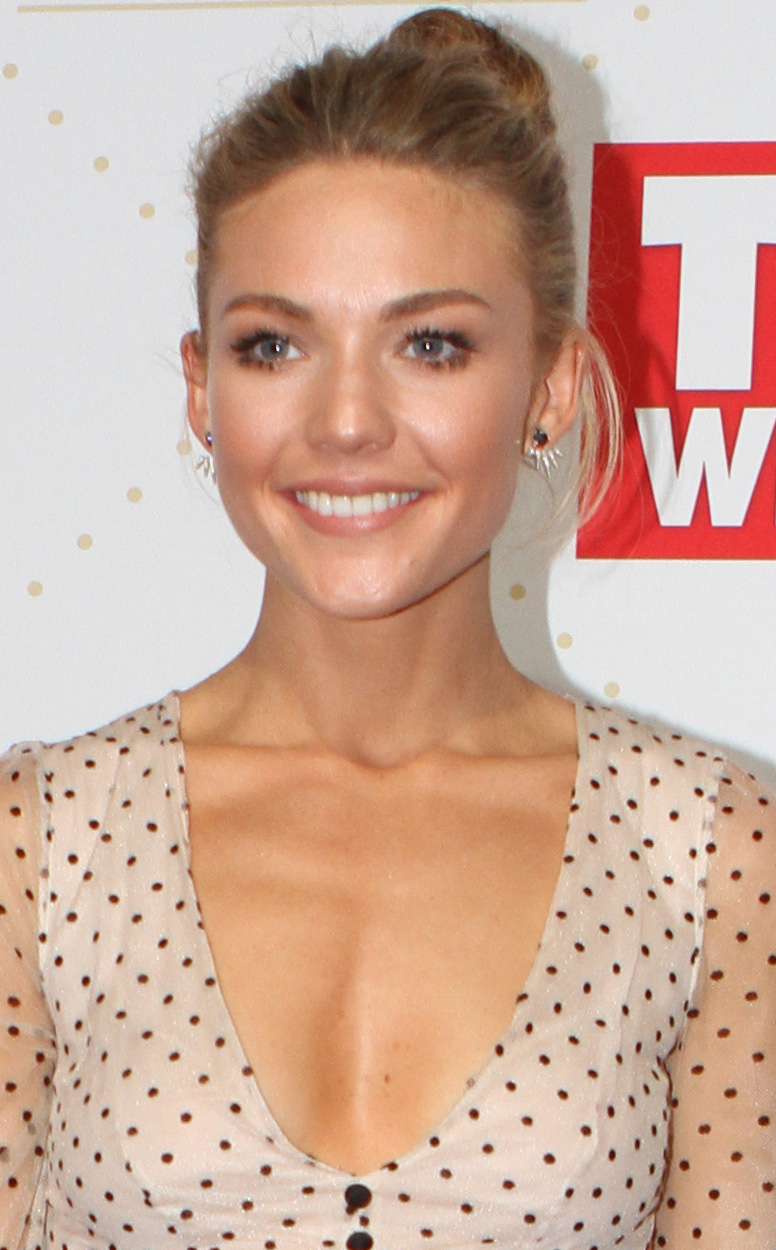
- Frost in May 2016
- Born: Samantha Frost; 4 April 1989 (age 37); Ferntree Gully, Victoria, Australia
- Occupations: Actress; media personality
- Years active: 2008–present
- Partner: Jordie Hansen (2022–present)
- Children: 2

Samantha Frost (born 4 April 1989) is an Australian media personality and actress. Frost won season 2 of The Bachelor Australia in 2014. She later starred in Australia's first season of The Bachelorette, which aired in 2015. Frost went on to co-host a breakfast radio show for 2Day FM in 2017 and began her acting career on the Australian television soap opera Home and Away, playing the role of Jasmine Delaney. She received a nomination for the Logie Award for Most Popular New Talent in 2018.

Before appearing on The Bachelor, Frost was a financial consultant for the BMW group. In 2020, Frost and her sister launched an online foundation called Believe By Sam Frost that focuses on mental health.

== Early life ==
Frost was born in Ferntree Gully on 4 April 1989 to Australian parents who were divorced in 1992 when Frost was three years old. Frost was raised mostly by her mother and her step-father as one of six children. Frost is the middle child, she has an older sister and four brothers, two younger and two older. Frost attended the Swinburne University of Technology in 2008 where she studied community welfare, specialising in youth and family protection, and graduated in 2010. Prior to starring on The Bachelor, Frost began work for the BMW Australia Group in 2012 as a sales executive. She later progressed to a finance and insurance consultant for the company. Frost's step-father died in 2012 of a stroke.

== Career ==
=== 2014–2017: The Bachelor and Rove and Sam ===
Frost appeared on season 2 of The Bachelor Australia in July 2014. She and 29 other women competed to win the heart of Blake Garvey, a then 31-year old real estate agent from Perth. In the final episode of the show, Garvey had to choose between Frost and her competitor Lisa Hyde. Garvey chose Frost and she accepted his proposal during the season finale. A proposal in the season finale is highly unusual on the Australian format of The Bachelor, which subsequently sparked a lot of interest around the couple. Shortly after, an official statement released by Network 10 said the engagement between the pair had been called off. Garvey ended the relationship days before the finale aired, which "completely blindsided" Frost. Garvey later entered into a relationship with second runner-up Louise Pillidge.

Frost went on to star in the first season of The Bachelorette Australia, broadcast in 2015. Frost's season aired across five weeks and surpassed the television ratings of the first two seasons of The Bachelor Australia. Frost chose Sasha Mielczarek – a then 30-year old construction manager from rural New South Wales – as her final contestant in the shows season finale. An article published by Network 10 stated "from the first rose to the last, the chemistry between the pair was undeniable", as the couple shared numerous single dates and intimate moments throughout the show. Following the show's conclusion, Frost and Mielczarek maintained a long-distance relationship and continued their romance for an additional 18 months, until a public statement released by Frost's management team announced the news of their split.

Following Frost's season of The Bachelorette Australia, she joined the 2Day FM radio station as a breakfast radio co-host in November 2015. Frost co-hosted the Rove and Sam national prime time breakfast radio show with comedian/media personality, Rove McManus. McManus and Frost's show struggled in the ratings and they achieved an audience share of only 3% of the Sydney market at the beginning of 2016. The pair managed a 0.8 percent increase by the end of the year. The show ran for 18-months. In January 2017, Southern Cross Austereo announced the Rove and Sam show would be downgraded from its prime position to an evening show due to poor ratings. It was replaced by The Em Rusciano Radio Show with Harley Breen. Five months after the show's demotion, 2Day FM cancelled Rove and Sam. Frost's contract with the station ended on 30 June 2017.

=== 2017–present: Hells Kitchen Australia and Home and Away ===
Frost joined the cast of Hell's Kitchen Australia on Channel 7 as a contestant, alongside fellow reality television stars, actors and sports personalities. The show aired throughout August and September 2017. Frost lasted up until the final week when she was eliminated by host and chef Marco Pierre White, after leaving the meat station unattended allowing a batch of lamb rumps to overcook.

That same year, Frost joined the main cast of Australian soap opera Home and Away as Jasmine Delaney. She made her debut during the season finale broadcast on 18 December 2017. The soap, which first screened in 1988, is ranked within the top 10 most watched Australian local television shows. Her character was described by Channel 7 as a spirited Aussie girl with a big heart and a dark past. When Frost auditioned for the role she had no prior acting experience, which led to some criticism as trained professionals were snubbed, however, Frost was defended by other Home and Away actors and crew. Julie McGauran, the Seven Network head of drama, also stood up for Frost's casting in the role. For her portrayal of Jasmine, Frost received a nomination for the Logie Award for Most Popular New Talent in May 2018.

Frost was announced as the ambassador for Everest Race Day in its second year of running. The race which debuted on Australian turf in 2017 is run on the second Saturday of October and is the richest turf race in the world with prize money of $15 million. While Frost was attending the race event, a gelding from Grafton won The Everest and took home $6 million of prize money. The day was one of the largest the Australian Turf Club has seen reaching its capacity of 40,000 guests. The gates of the Australian Turf Club had to be shut after midday due to the massive attendance.

In 2020, Frost took part in the three-part special The All New Monty: Guys and Gals, which follows 15 celebrities who strip to raise money and awareness for men's and women's cancers. It was hosted by Shane Jacobson and Frost's Home and Away co-star Georgie Parker, with the routines choreographed by Todd McKenney.

Frost's role on Home and Away spanned across five years. In October 2021, she faced widespread public scrutiny for a video she uploaded to her Instagram account detailing her decision not to take the COVID-19 vaccine, and for comparing the public backlash she faced to "segregation". In the video she stated: "there are many reasons why people aren't getting vaccinated... there's a few reasons why I'm not... I've spoken to my doctor and my psychologist about it and I'm going to keep that private". Consequently, Frost deactivated her Instagram account for two-weeks before reactivating it. Channel 7 later made COVID vaccinations mandatory for all staff and stated that all employees would need to be double vaccinated by 10 January 2022. Days after this statement was released, Frost claimed she would be getting vaccinated in February 2022 following a medical procedure. Channel 7 planned to temporarily write her character out of the show and allow for her to return to filming once she was fully vaccinated. However, on 17 December 2021, Channel 7 announced that Frost had decided to leave Home and Away permanently. Frost later explained that she chose to leave her "dream job" to focus on her family, friends and mental health.

Following her exit from Home and Away, Frost announced in March 2022 that she and her sister, Kris Ross would appear in the second season of reality series My Road to Adventure, which follows the pair travelling in a motor home along the Great Ocean Road. They previously appeared in an episode during the first season.

== Believe by Sam Frost ==
In 2020, Frost and her sister Kristine Ross co-founded Believe By Sam Frost, a website that focuses on helping young girls who are struggling with mental health issues. Frost used the platform to open up about suffering with depression. Frost's mother Debbie had a long battle with mental health and eating disorders while raising six children as a single parent. When her mother's partner Paul died of a stroke, her mental health deteriorated and Frost called Beyond Blue to ask for help. Frost has since hosted fundraiser events and has donated to the Beyond Blue Foundation. Having opened up about her own struggles with mental health, Frost wanted to provide other young women like herself with the necessary tools to cope and deal with such difficult times. She said: "For me, depression has been something that I've battled my whole life". The Believe website offers advice on a number of mental health related topics such as social media, anxiety, and body image. In addition to Believe by Sam Frost, Frost and her sister also launched a project titled Stronger by Believe in which they promote body image and self-confidence while hosting workshops with teenage girls.

In March 2022, Frost released a memoir called Believe, which was co-written with her sister, and is about mental health from Frost's personal experience.

== Personal life ==
Frost met her partner Jordie Hansen, a landscaper and former Australian Survivor contestant, through her brother in early 2022. After leaving Home and Away, Frost moved from New South Wales back to Victoria to live with Hansen. The couple co-host the Jordie and Sam's Rural Roadtrip podcast. On 7 July 2022, Frost and Hansen announced their engagement. In September, they announced they were expecting their first child, and they relocated to Queensland the following month. Frost and Hansen welcomed their first child, a son, on 7 March 2023. In November 2024, Frost confirmed she and Hansen were expecting their second child, and their son was born on 29 March 2025.

== Filmography ==
=== Acting ===
| Year | Title | Role | Note |
|---|---|---|---|
| 2017–2022 | Home and Away | Jasmine Delaney | Season 30–35 (main role, 432 episodes) |

=== Self appearances ===
| Year | Title | Role | Note |
|---|---|---|---|
| 2014 | The Bachelor | Contestant | Season 2 (winner) |
| 2015 | The Bachelorette | Bachelorette | Season 1 |
| 2015 | Have You Been Paying Attention? | Herself | Season 3 (2 episodes) |
| 2017 | Hell's Kitchen Australia | Contestant | Season 1 (eliminated week 5) |
| 2018 | Endless Summer: 30 Years of Home and Away | Herself | Documentary |
| 2019 | Home and Away: Christmas in Summer Bay | Herself | Documentary (episodes 1 & 5) |
| 2020 | Behave Yourself! | Guest | Season 1 (2 episodes) |
| 2020 | My Road to Adventure | Herself | Season 1 (1 episode) |
| 2020 | The All New Monty: Guys and Gals | Herself | Charity special |
| 2023 | Australian Survivor | Herself (uncredited) | Season 10 (1 episode) |

== Awards and nominations ==
| Year | Association | Category | Work | Result | Ref |
|---|---|---|---|---|---|
| 2018 | Logie Awards | Most Popular New Talent | Home and Away | Nominated | |
| 2020 | AACTA Awards | Audience Choice Award – Favourite TV Contestant of the Decade | The Bachelor | Nominated | |
| 2020 | Inside Soap Awards | Best Daytime Star | Home and Away | Nominated | |
