= The Bachelorette (Australian TV series) season 1 =

The Bachelorette
- Season 1
- Starring: Sam Frost
- Presented by: Osher Günsberg
- No. of contestants: 14
- Winner: Sasha Mielczarek
- Runner-up: Michael Turnbull
- No. of episodes: 10

Release
- Original network: Network Ten
- Original release: 23 September – 22 October 2015

Season chronology
- Next → Season 2

The first season of The Bachelorette Australia premiered on Network Ten on 23 September 2015. The season features Sam Frost, a 26-year-old Marketing Manager from Melbourne, Victoria, courting 14 men. Frost previously appeared on the second season of The Bachelor Australia, where although she won the show and received a proposal from Blake Garvey, the two separated prior to the finale airing.

== Contestants ==
The season began with 14 contestants.

Name	Age	Hometown	Occupation	Eliminated
Sasha Mielczarek	30	Bowral, New South Wales	Construction Manager	Winner
Michael Turnbull	34	Brisbane, Queensland	Professional Soccer Player	Runner-Up
Richie Strahan	30	Perth, Western Australia	Rope Access Technician	Episode 9
Alex Cameron	35	Avoca Beach, New South Wales	Financial Consultant	Episode 8
Dave Billsborrow	30	Sydney, New South Wales	Plumber	Episode 7
Davey Lloyd	25	Sydney, New South Wales	Carpenter	Episode 6
Kayne Buik	25	Perth, Western Australia	Mining Electrician	Episode 5
Tony Strugar	32	Brisbane, Queensland	Airline Cabin Manager	Episode 5
Kieren Nicholson	28	Melbourne, Victoria	Exercise Physiologist	Episode 4
Will Ferrier	31	Perth, Western Australia	Musician	Episode 4
Drew Woolford	31	Brisbane, Queensland	Sleep Technician	Episode 3
David Witko	31	Melbourne, Victoria	International Model	Episode 2
Shane Leverett	27	Byron Bay, New South Wales	Charity Ambassador	Episode 1
Luke Haddrick	28	Sydney, New South Wales	Marketing Manager	Episode 1

=== Future appearances ===
Richie Strahan was later chosen as the bachelor on the fourth season of The Bachelor. Michael Turnbull and Davey Lloyd returned for the inaugural series of Bachelor in Paradise. Strahan later returned for the second season of Bachelor in Paradise.

== Call-out order ==
Color key

The contestant received a first impression rose.
The contestant received a rose during the date or after the date.
The contestant was eliminated outside the rose ceremony.
The contestant was eliminated.
The contestant quit the competition.
The contestant won the competition.
The contestant was eliminated during a date.

Sam's Call-Out Order
#	Bachelors	Episodes									
#	Bachelors	1	2	3	4	5	6	7	8	9	10
1	Dave	Sasha	Dave	Sasha	Alex	Davey	Richie	Sasha	Michael	Sasha	Sasha
2	Alex	Alex	Richie	Michael	Richie	Michael	N/A	Michael	Sasha	Michael	Michael
3	Davey	Drew	Michael	Dave	Michael	Sasha	N/A	Richie	Richie	Richie	
4	David	Dave	Davey	Richie	Sasha	Dave	N/A	Alex	Alex		
5	Sasha	Tony	Alex	Kieren	Kayne	Alex	N/A	Dave			
6	Drew	Kieren	Sasha	Alex	Dave	Richie	Davey				
7	Tony	Richie	Will	Will	Tony	Kayne					
8	Kayne	Michael	Drew	Kayne	Davey	Tony					
9	Luke	David	Tony	Davey	Kieren; Will						
10	Kieren	Will	Kieren	Tony	Kieren; Will						
11	Shane	Kayne	Kayne	Drew							
12	Will	Davey	David								
13	Michael	Luke; Shane									
14	Richie	Luke; Shane									

== Episodes ==
=== Episode 1 ===
Original airdate: 23 September 2015

Event	Description
First impression rose	Sasha
Rose ceremony	Luke and Shane were eliminated

=== Episode 2 ===
Original airdate: 24 September 2015

Event	Description
One-on-one date	Dave
Group date	David, Michael, Sasha, Kieren, Drew, Richie, Kayne, and Tony
Rose ceremony	David was eliminated

=== Episode 3 ===
Original airdate: 30 September 2015

Event	Description
One-on-one date	Sasha
Group date	Kieren, Richie, Michael, Dave, Will, Tony, Kayne, and Davey
Rose ceremony	Drew was eliminated

=== Episode 4 ===
Original airdate: 1 October 2015

Event	Description
One-on-one date	Alex
Group date	Will, Kayne, Richie, Dave, Davey, and Sasha
Rose ceremony	Kieren and Will were eliminated

=== Episode 5 ===
Original airdate: 7 October 2015

Event	Description
Two-on-one date	Davey and Tony; Tony was eliminated.
Group date	Dave, Michael, Alex, Sasha, Kayne, and Richie
Rose ceremony	Kayne was eliminated.

=== Episode 6 ===
Original airdate: 8 October 2015

Event	Description
Group date	Dave, Sasha, Alex, Michael and Davey
One-on-one date	Richie
Rose ceremony	Davey was eliminated outside the rose ceremony.

=== Episode 7 ===
Original airdate: 14 October 2015

Event	Description
One-on-one date	Sasha
Group date	None
Rose ceremony	Dave was eliminated

=== Episode 8 ===
Original airdate: 15 October 2015

Event	Description
First Hometown	Michael - Brisbane, Queensland
Second Hometown	Alex - Avoca Beach, New South Wales
Third Hometown	Richie - Perth, Western Australia
Fourth Hometown	Sasha - Bowral, New South Wales
Rose ceremony	Alex was eliminated

=== Episode 9 ===
Original airdate: 21 October 2015

Event	Description
First One-on-one date	Sasha
Second One-on-one date	Richie
Third One-on-one date	Michael
Rose ceremony	Richie was eliminated

=== Episode 10 ===
Original airdate: 22 October 2015

Event	Description
First Meet Sam's family	Michael
Second Meet Sam's family	Sasha
First Final date	Michael
Second Final date	Sasha
Final decision:	Sasha is the winner

== Ratings ==
No.	Title	Air date	Overnight Viewers		Consolidated ratings		Total viewers	Ref(s)
No.	Title	Air date	Viewers	Rank	Viewers	Rank	Total viewers	Ref(s)
1	Episode 1	23 September 2015	875,000	8	87,000	7	962,000	
2	Episode 2	24 September 2015	973,000	1	77,000	1	1,050,000	
3	Episode 3	30 September 2015	992,000	5	36,000	4	1,028,000	
4	Episode 4	1 October 2015	875,000	4	121,000	2	996,000	
5	Episode 5	7 October 2015	918,000	6	50,000	5	968,000	
6	Episode 6	8 October 2015	855,000	6	105,000	1	960,000	
7	Episode 7	14 October 2015	879,000	7	44,000	6	923,000	
8	Episode 8	15 October 2015	930,000	1	71,000	1	1,001,000	
9	Episode 9	21 October 2015	1,026,000	3	34,000	1	1,060,000	
10	Finale Final Decision	22 October 2015	1,241,000 1,520,000	2 1	27,000 43,000	2 1	1,268,000 1,563,000	
