= Dating in the Dark Australia =

Television series

- Genre: Reality
- Presented by: Laura Dundovic
- Country of origin: Australia
- Original language: English
- No. of seasons: 2
- No. of episodes: 16

Production
- Running time: 45 minutes
- Production company: Shine Australia

Original release
- Network: Fox8
- Release: 1 December 2010 – 29 May 2012

Related
- Dating in the Dark

Dating in the Dark Australia premiered on the Fox8 subscription television on 1 December 2010. The show's format is based on a Dutch dating show called Daten in het Donker (English: "Dating in the Dark"). The series is hosted by Laura Dundovic. A second season premiered on 10 April 2012.

The premise of the show involves three single guys and three single girls who are brought together in one house. They only come into contact with the opposite sex in a dark room, with high definition night vision cameras capturing their meetings. The contestants are encouraged to touch each other to see if they like the physical body of the person they may go on a romantic date with.
