= Class Of... =

- Genre: factual
- Country of origin: Australia
- Original language: English
- No. of seasons: 1
- No. of episodes: 10

Original release
- Network: Network Ten
- Release: 15 August 2012 – September 2012

Class Of... is an Australian factual program all about schools that aired on Network Ten on 15 August 2012; originally in 2011.
