= Hell's Kitchen Australia =

- Genre: Reality
- Presented by: Marco Pierre White
- Country of origin: Australia
- Original language: English
- No. of series: 1
- No. of episodes: 15

Production
- Executive producer: Matt Apps
- Production locations: Sydney, New South Wales
- Production company: ITV Studios Australia

Original release
- Network: Seven Network
- Release: 6 August – 5 September 2017

Hell's Kitchen Australia is an Australian cooking reality competition television series which premiered on the Seven Network on 6 August 2017. The series was hosted by British chef Marco Pierre White, who previously hosted two seasons of the British version of the format and appeared on MasterChef Australia.

== Production ==
The series began casting for celebrity contestants in late 2016, and filmed in Sydney for six weeks in March and April 2017. It is produced for the Seven Network by ITV Studios Australia.

Program sponsorships include Aldi, Airtasker, Diaego, Lurpak and Sony Pictures.

== Celebrities ==
The following ten celebrities have been competing in the series to win AU$50,000 for their chosen charity.

Celebrities	Known for	Status
Debra Lawrance	Actress	Winner; 5 September 2017
Gaz Beadle	Geordie Shore star	Runner-up; 5 September 2017
Willie Mason	Former NRL player	Eliminated; 5 September 2017
Lincoln Lewis	Actor	Eliminated; 5 September 2017
Sam Frost	The Bachelorette Australia star & radio presenter	Eliminated; 4 September 2017
Issa Schultz	The Chase Australia chaser	Eliminated; 29 August 2017
Jess Fox	Olympian	Eliminated; 29 August 2017
David Oldfield	One Nation co-founder	Eliminated; 22 August 2017
Pettifleur Berenger	Real Housewives of Melbourne star	Eliminated; 15 August 2017
Candice Warner	Former Ironwoman	Eliminated; 8 August 2017

=== Results and elimination ===
Celebrity was on the Blue Team
Celebrity was on the Red Team
Celebrity was on the White Team
Indicates that the celebrity won the series
Indicates that the celebrity finished runner-up
Indicates that the celebrity finished in third place
Indicates that the celebrity was in the bottom 3
Indicates that the celebrity was evicted immediately (no bottom three)

Elimination results per celebrity
No.	Celebrity	Week 1	Week 2	Week 3	Week 4	Week 5		Grand Final
No.	Celebrity	Week 1	Week 2	Week 3	Week 4	Night 1	Night 2	Grand Final
1	Debra	Safe	Bottom 3	Safe	Safe	Safe	Safe	Winner (Week 5)
2	Gaz	Safe	Safe	Safe	Safe	Safe	Safe	Runner-up (Week 5)
3	Willie	Safe	Safe	Bottom 3	Safe	Safe	Safe	Third Place (Week 5)
4	Lincoln	Safe	Safe	Safe	Bottom 3	Safe	Eliminated	Eliminated (Week 5)
5	Sam	Safe	Safe	Safe	Safe	Eliminated	Eliminated (Week 5)	
6	Issa	Safe	Safe	Bottom 3	Bottom 3	Eliminated (Week 4)		
6	Jess	Bottom 3	Safe	Safe	Bottom 3	Eliminated (Week 4)		
8	David	Safe	Bottom 3	Bottom 3	Eliminated (Week 3)			
9	Pettifleur	Bottom 3	Bottom 3	Eliminated (Week 2)				
10	Candice	Bottom 3	Eliminated (Week 1)					
Bottom three		Candice Jess Pettifleur	David Debra Pettifleur	David Issa Willie	Issa Jess Lincoln	None		
Eliminated		Candice	Pettifleur	David	Jess	Sam	Lincoln	Willie
Eliminated		Candice	Pettifleur	David	Jess	Sam	Lincoln	Gaz
Eliminated		Candice	Pettifleur	David	Issa	Sam	Lincoln	Gaz
Eliminated		Candice	Pettifleur	David	Issa	Sam	Lincoln	Debra

== Series details ==
=== Week 1 ===
==== Services ====
- Episodes 1 to 3
- Airdates - 6 to 8 August 2017
- Description - A celebrity from the losing team in two dinner services and a lunch service (60 covers), based on their performance that night, is chosen by Marco to go into an elimination challenge at the end of the week. Winners of the first challenge gain immunity, winners of the second can be excused from doing prep work for both kitchens. Before service 1, each person must make an egg dish, Debra won immunity, and they get masterclasses to get new menu. In a relay challenge before service 2, a member from each team must finely chop an onion, garlic, parsley, slice a big mushroom and truss a chicken with the head chopped off and wishbone removed, in which Blue team won 3–2. Service 2 always featured Marco and/or the sous chefs leaving the kitchen mid-service, and anyone working the pass must relay, expedite and co-ordinate orders and manage the dessert orders and clear-downs on their own. Before service 3, which is always the more hectic lunch service, everybody is assigned to a different position, and the red team's steamer leaked water, making it out of order. Debra was out during service as she badly cut herself trying to grab a knife to cut fruits for the dessert.

Service	Scores		Worst performer	Reason
Service	Blue team	Red team	Worst performer	Reason
1	7	7.5	Candice	Problems with the fish station
2	7	6.5	Jess	Problems with the beef, on the Pass and didn't help the team.
3	7.5	7	Pettifleur	Wasn't a team player and communication issues.

==== Last chance cook-off ====
- Episode 3
- Airdates - 8 August 2017
- Description: - In a "Taste it & Make it" elimination challenge, the three celebrities had to taste a dish that Marco had created, which was a chicken skewer with spring onion and madras curry powder cooked in olive oil, and remake it.

Celebrity	Dish	Position	Reason	Result
Jess	Chicken skewer with curry powder and spring onion.	1	Very similar to Marco's dish.	Safe
Pettifleur	Chicken skewer with curry powder, salt, pepper and spring onion cooked in butter.	2	The chicken was dry, wrong seasoning, cooked in butter, but everything else was fine.	Safe
Candice	Chicken skewer with cumin and spring onion.	3	The chicken was undercooked, and she had the wrong spice.	Eliminated

=== Week 2 ===
==== Services ====
- Episodes 4 to 6
- Airdates - 13 to 15 August 2017
- Description - A celebrity from the losing team in two dinner services and a lunch service (70 covers per service), based on their performance that night, is chosen by Marco to go into an elimination challenge at the end of the week. The menu is completely different from last week. In the cases were teams draw even, Marco nominates the weakest celebrity from both teams, then chooses the weakest overall to send to elimination. Issa won the immunity challenge before the first service as he beat Debra on the 'Perfectly Cooked Skinless Salmon Fillet Challenge', despite Debra made a perfect Ceviche to strategically save her injured hand from contacts with heat and water. Before service 2's relay challenge, they were at Sydney Fish Market to learn to prepare shellfish as they were special items on the menu. The teams must unshell and de-vein the shrimps, shuck oysters from the back (the English method) with sea water retained, devein, gut and cut the marron into halves, and one will separate and gut the already-cooked crab, with the claws separated and one piece of shell cracked open. Sam sits out the challenge as Red team has a one-person advantage. Pettifleur secured the win 3–1 overall after her crab retained more of the claws' meat than Issa. This time, with Red team's win, they can choose to cook for the portion of guests out of 70 for the dinner service, but they forego the number's advantage in that regard and split it fairly (35 for each team), in which Marco said that David should have listened to Lincoln and took on 5 extra covers given the extra-person advantage, rather than trying to hamstring them by increasing their workload. Pettifleur is taken away from the red team as she must prepare and serve the extra starter: The 70's style shrimp cocktail table-side for both red and blue team unassisted from the kitchen crew. During service 2, Lincoln's mother was amongst the guests, and Marco had to shut down an incorrect claim by a customer where the salmon starter was frozen, and ask David not to engage because she was incorrect, and has never tried salmon confit-style, before walking out to monitor them from his office. After that service, Jacqueline, Lincoln's mother, fuelled the State of Origin-like rivalry, while Issa met his fan. In service 3, David and Gaz's partners and friends were amongst the customers.

Service	Scores		Worst performer	Reason
Service	Blue team	Red team	Worst performer	Reason
1	7.5	7.5	Pettifleur	Poor performance on the pass and arguing with Marco Debra was picked from blue team because Issa was immuned, and was notably slow serving the starters and desserts.
2	6	6.5	Debra	Poor performance during service, over garnished the starters, poor organization and slow work during desserts. She nominated herself as the most likely to survive the elimination challenge. With Red team's win, David was spared from his problems as an expeditor.
3	7.5	7.5	David	Didn't stay loyal to his team and left his position during desserts. Issa was picked in the blue team as the weakest of the blue team, but was spared because it was his best service thus far.

==== Last chance cook-off ====
- Episode 6
- Airdates - 15 August 2017
- Description: - In a "Taste it & Make it" elimination challenge, the three celebrities had to taste a dish that Marco had created, which was a turkey schnitzel with Parmesan and rosemary cooked in clarified butter.

Celebrity	Dish	Position	Reason	Result
Debra	Chicken schnitzel with Parmesan and thyme, cooked in olive oil and then clarified butter.	1	Cooked the best schnitzel out of everyone, despite all having the wrong protein and herb.	Safe
David	Chicken schnitzel with Parmesan and parsley, cooked in olive oil and butter rubbed in.	2	The breadcrumb was too thick. However, Marco's preferred David's schnitzel over Pettifleur's	Safe
Pettifleur	Chicken schnitzel with Parmesan and thyme, cooked in olive oil.	3	Uneven breadcrumb as Pettifleur did not use flour while preparing the chicken. Marco preferred David's schnitzel over Pettifleur's.	Eliminated

=== Week 3 ===
==== Services ====
- Episodes 7 to 9
- Airdates - 20 to 22 August 2017
- Description - A celebrity from the losing team in two dinner services and a lunch service, with the restaurant at capacity (80 covers), based on their performance that night, is chosen by Marco to go into an elimination challenge at the end of the week. Before service 1, they learn to make Venetian-style risotto with grated onion and garlic, cooked in butter, olive oil, white wine (Pinot Grigio) and rosemary, then coated in Parmesan and butter, but in a two-people team challenge, they have 45 minutes (instead of 30 in the demonstration) to make a risotto of their choice. Lincoln and Jess' risotto beat Willie and Issa's risotto that both almost replicated Marco's only with added chicken stock and mushrooms, and they gain immunity. Before service 2, they learn to make tagliatelle pasta from scratch with the dough already made by Pina, before a pairs team challenge. Using the pre-made batches of dough, they must roll and hang as much tagliatelle as they can in each 5-minute interval. Blue team lost because most of the tagliatelle became unusable after Willie and Gaz tangled them, so blue team's punishment is to make all the pasta special for both teams, which was replaced by macaroni as both team don't have enough usable tagliatelle together, while also making everyone work at station that they have yet to be in.

Service	Scores		Worst performer	Reason
Service	Blue team	Red team	Worst performer	Reason
1	7	8	Issa	Weak cook, cannot allow Debra to protect him again, negative diner feedbacks on desserts, but had his best service thus far.
2	7	6.5	David	Did not support Sam at the start of service. It was Issa (pass) and Debra's (meat) worst services.
3	6	7	Willie	Negative diner feedback to Willie's dish, cannot allow Debra to protect him again.

==== Last chance cook-off ====
- Episode 9
- Airdates - 22 August 2017
- Description: - In a "Taste it & Make it" elimination challenge, the three celebrities had to taste a dish that Marco had created, which was beef and pork meatballs, served with parsley and manchego cheese, and finished in the oven

Celebrity	Dish	Position	Reason	Result
Willie	Beef and pork meatballs with parsley and manchego cheese	1	Best meatballs out of everyone	Safe
Issa	Beef and pork meatballs with parsley and manchego cheese	2	The taste wasn't very strong, but the actual meatball was better, because he changed from lamb to pork late in cook.	Safe
David	Turkey and pork meatballs with parsley and manchego cheese	3	Only person to finish the cook in the oven, but meatballs were dry, wrong primary protein and incorrect binding agent (flour instead of bread.)	Eliminated

=== Week 4 ===
==== Services ====
- Episodes 10 to 12
- Airdates - 28 and 29 August 2017
- Description - In the first service, a chef from the losing team is chosen from the 2 dinner services and a lunch service (80 covers plus a turnover-round of 10 covers) based on their performance that night, and Marco forewarned that two celebrities will be eliminated at the end of the week. Before service one, all must create a family-sized salad to be individually portioned off table-side. Lincoln won with a Caesar salad, but with an invented salad dressing with honey, soy sauce and mayonnaise with unlikely help from Mason, who made his own steak salad since they both can't make Caesar dressing. With the blue team back to the most comfortable stations, except Debra chose to work at the pass. Before second service, teams must cut a lamb's entire rib cage into 10 lamb chops and 10 lamb racks, then pan-fry the lamb cutlets with olive oil, lemon juice and rosemary. The relay is: With the pine already removed, 6 of 7 members trims and cuts the lamb cutlets (Issa sits out), then they must marinade and cook their own lambs, but they must use their own marinade. With Mason, Gary and Lincoln having the same marinade (thyme, rosemary, olive oil and mint), Mason decided to pour white wine vinegar during cooking. In the head-to-head, Sam beat Gary for her quantity, and her clever time management for managing three uneven-sized cutlets. Debra beat Lincoln in quantity., despite both are perfectly cooked. Mason won it for the blue team as Sam's cutlets were unseasoned. Blue team won, and elected Lincoln to make the lamb rack special for both teams on top of being in charge of the fish station, with Sam in charge of the meat and the Moroccan-style lamb rump. Marco questioned Mason's tactic as he could have taken on the role himself, so Marco put him as a floater-sweeper. In the second service, when both teams scored equally, Marco nominated Lincoln and Issa as the weakest in their respective teams, Issa was chosen because he has diminished role and presence in the kitchen as the one in charge of the fish. In the third service, Issa served as a waiter for delivering food for the blue team as he was already in the last-chance cook-off, while the remaining chefs were scored individually by diners, with Marco choosing the weakest from the lowest ranked chefs. Sam's family were amongst the guests. They compete in a last chance cook off.

Service	Scores						Worst performer	Reason
Service	Blue team			Red team			Worst performer	Reason
1	8			7.5			Jess	Sam worked at three stations (Starters, Desserts and pass) by herself and Lincoln had immunity.
2	7.5			7.5			Issa	Issa contributed less than Lincoln, despite being Issa's best service thus far.
Service	Debra	Willie	Gaz	Sam	Jess	Lincoln	Worst performer	Reason
3	8	7.5	7.5	9	8	7.5	Lincoln	Lincoln was the weakest out of Gaz, Willie, and Lincoln.

==== Last chance cook-off ====
- Episode 12
- Airdates - 29 August 2017
- Description: - In a "Taste it & Make it" elimination challenge, the three celebrities had to taste a dish that Marco had created, which was a Blue-eyed cod fillet, with boiled potatoes with saffron, accompanied by a smoked paprika mayonnaise. Unlike past weeks, two chefs were dismissed in this week.

Celebrity	Dish	Position	Reason	Result
Lincoln	Barramundi fillet with boiled potatoes and saffron, turmeric and cayenne, accompanied by a sweet paprika mayonnaise	1	Had the best fish out of everyone, though the potatoes were seasoned badly, and the wrong fish and spices were picked	Safe
Issa	Blue-eyed cod fillet with boiled potatoes and turmeric, accompanied by a sweet paprika mayonnaise	2	Overcooked fish, wrong spice and mayonnaise	Eliminated
Jess	Barramundi fillet with boiled potatoes and saffron, accompanied by a hot paprika mayonnaise	2	Undercooked fish, wrong fish and mayonnaise	Eliminated

=== Week 5 - Finals Week ===
- Episodes 13 to 15
- Airdates - 4 and 5 September 2017
- Description - This week saw the final five cooks being merged into one team. Instead of Blue and Red Teams, they became the White Team. The weakest cook, as picked by Marco, from the two services (60 covers plus a turnover-round of 0 covers) are immediately eliminated, but the guests score the team as a whole.

Before service one, all contestants become the instructors, expeditor and taste-tester, and their family members must recreate a dish under the contestant's orders (risotto, family-sized salad, egg florentine, fillet of skin-on salmon) under more lenient time limits (30 minutes for salmon, 35 for egg florentine, 45 for risotto). Dennis (Debra's husband) made family-sized salmon salad, Jacquiline (Lincoln's mother) made a salmon fillet, Kristine (Sam's sister) made Asian-style salmon with asparagus. Emma, (Gaz's girlfriend) came second with the egg florentine. Willie won with his wife, Claire's saffron risotto. The group scored 7.5 overall. In the second service, which is a lunch service, Willie was praised for his efficiency, despite manning 2 fish stations all by himself with most of the guest ordering the salmon main. He was the only person who survived from the fish station. Lincoln was put into the cookoff because he was supposed to be manning the meat station with Gaz, but was demoted to garnish by Gaz. Debra was put into the cookoff by default as Gaz managed most of the workload on the relay and commanded the pass after Marco left the kitchen, and Debra couldn't keep up after they arrived, despite being her best service ever. Gaz and Willie commanded their stations and

There was also a final last chance cook-off between Debra and Lincoln to decide the third and final place in the grand final (Dubbed the "Summer Bay cook-off" as both starred in Home and Away). The dish that they had to cook was kidneys (served pink), coated with flour, chilli power and English mustard on white bread toast with a devilled sauce in 30 minutes.

The components in question are: Type of bread (white, brioche, cob loaf), main offal (pig heart, liver, kidneys, must pick one from the larder, and cannot change once decisions are made), coating before cooking (flour, chilli power and English mustard; flour, smoked paprika and cayenne; flour, paprika and turmeric) and the agent used to thicken the pre-prepared devil's sauce (butter, oil, cream). The winner of the cook-off was Debra, which saw Lincoln's dismissal from Hell's Kitchen. Willie and Gaz can observe live on the other side of the pass.

Service Night	Eliminated Celebrity	Reason
1	Sam	Left the meat station, and let a whole batch of lamb rump steak overcook. Debra was spared by Marco, despite losing control of her station (starters and dessert).
2	Lincoln	Debra had the better dish in the last chance cook off, Lincoln got a couple things wrong (brioche instead of white bread, cream used for thickening agent instead of butter, both got the spices wrong) as well as poor cooking techniques (putting kidneys in to cook far too early, flour in pan, over-soaked the bread in butter, burnt one batch.)

=== Grand Final ===
- Episode 15
- Airdates - 5 September 2017
- Description: The remaining 3 chefs compete in an elimination challenge: Roast and carve a full chicken each in 75 minutes, but must include 2 garnishes and a sauce or gravy, and the oven pre-set to 180. Marco is the expeditor, the judges that would be in the blind tastings are the eliminated guests, hidden in the function room away from the restaurant. They would be scored from 1–3, with 3 being the best. David caused issues when he scored Gaz's and Debra's chicken tied for 2 points.

Celebrity	Dish	Position	Assorted Comments	Result
Gaz	Roast chicken with wild mushrooms, green beans, roasting juices and Bearnaise sauce	1	Sam: Perfect presentation, chicken was moist and juicy, all was needed was a bread to clean the sauce up. Lincoln: I'd be stoked if this was served to me in a restaurant. Perfect beans, beautiful beans. Issa: I love the Bearnaise sauce that goes well with the chicken.	Safe
Debra	Tarragon-roasted chicken with roasted asparagus, parsnip mashed potatoes and gravy	2	Sam, Candice, Lincoln: Great strong flavours, but Candice found bone on the breast tip. David: Overcooked asparagus, otherwise a great dish.	Safe
Willie	Roast chicken with mushrooms, braised lettuce and rosemary-infused gravy	3	Pettifleur: Lettuce looks overcooked and wilted, dry meat David: Lovely wild mushrooms, don't like the wilted lettuce	Eliminated

==== Final service ====
- Episode 15
- Airdates - 5 September 2017
- Description: Right after the elimination of Willie, the final service will involve all contestants, with Debra and Gaz being head chefs, they must pick the members and position them and themselves accordingly (dubbed "The Ashes cook-off" by Lincoln as Gaz is from England, and Debra is Australian ). Gaz (pass) picked Willie (fish), Sam (starters, desserts), Lincoln (meat), Issa (starters, desserts). Debra (floater) picked Jess (meat), David (fish), Candice (starters, desserts) and Pettifleur (starters, desserts). Both team captains have white hats, while the rest have black hats. The final dinner service will have 120 covers, meaning the restaurant will be completely turned over twice (2x60 covers), while the kitchen must be cleaned down and reset with them. The menu consists of 3 starters, 2 mains, 3 desserts. The guest will write comments, but will not score. Colin Fassnidge of My Kitchen Rules amongst the guests in the second round of diners. Debra won because she led the team of cooks with the least experience, despite her missing that David pre-dressed the second orders of asparagus starter before they were ordered, then him mishearing the two extra orders of salmon was for Gaz's team, and David again completely messing up on the timing. Gaz's presence was badly drowned by Willie as he has never truly taken on a leadership role in the first round of service, and leaving the salmon station. Debra's $50,000 goes towards the Ovarian Cancer Foundation, but she decided to split it, so $25,000 of which would go towards Australian Wounded Heroes. Debra also received the winner's trophy and Marco's knife.

== Reception ==
=== Ratings ===
Hell's Kitchen Australia debuted to 817,000 viewers and was second in its timeslot to The Block (1,212,000).

No.	Title	Air date	Timeslot	Overnight ratings		Consolidated ratings		Total viewers	Ref(s)
No.	Title	Air date	Timeslot	Viewers	Rank	Viewers	Rank	Total viewers	Ref(s)
1	Episode 1	6 August 2017	Sunday 7:00pm	817,000	4	48,000	5	865,000	
2	Episode 2	7 August 2017	Monday 7:30pm	615,000	16	44,000	16	659,000	
3	Episode 3	8 August 2017	Tuesday 7:30pm	632,000	12	37,000	11	669,000	
4	Episode 4	13 August 2017	Sunday 8:00pm	544,000	9	32,000	10	545,000	
5	Episode 5	14 August 2017	Monday 7:30pm	607,000	16	36,000	14	644,000	
6	Episode 6	15 August 2017	Tuesday 7:30pm	527,000	16	31,000	14	558,000	
7	Episode 7	20 August 2017	Sunday 8:00pm	543,000	9	51,000	9	594,000	
8	Episode 8	21 August 2017	Monday 7:30pm	529,000	19	45,000	18	574,000	
9	Episode 9	22 August 2017	Tuesday 7:30pm	540,000	14	37,000	13	576,000	
10	Episode 10	28 August 2017	Monday 7:30pm	546,000	16	51,000	14	597,000	
11	Episode 11	29 August 2017	Tuesday 7:30pm	504,000	15	50,000	14	554,000	
12	Episode 12	29 August 2017	Tuesday 9:00pm	488,000	16	61,000	15	549,000	
13	Episode 13	4 September 2017	Monday 7:30pm	509,000	19	49,000	18	558,000	
14	Episode 14	5 September 2017	Tuesday 7:30pm	482,000	17	53,000	15	535,000	
15	Episode 15	5 September 2017	Tuesday 9:00pm	528,000	15	70,000	11	598,000	

=== Critical reception ===
Colin Vickery, television writer for the Herald Sun was critical of the show, describing Marco Pierre White as "a cartoon version of himself". Vickery also criticised the low-grade nature of the celebrities and the paltry prize on offer. Denise Eriksen, journalist for The New Daily said the show "was a shocker" and that "Seven's execs should have pulled the plug on the show because it doesn't have huge celebrities, it's not that funny and Marco Pierre White isn't Gordon Ramsay". David Knox of TV Tonight, gave the series a rating of 2 out of 5 stars, criticising the show on its low-grade celebrities and that it "lacks the authenticity required of committing to a stripped primetime format in what is already an over-crowded genre".

== See also ==
- List of Australian television series
- List of cooking shows
