= The Boss Is Coming to Dinner =

- The Boss is Coming to Dinner opening title card
- Country of origin: Australia
- No. of series: 1
- No. of episodes: 2

Production
- Producer: Shine Australia
- Running time: Approx 48 minutes per episode

Original release
- Network: Nine Network
- Release: 22 September – 29 September 2010

Related
- The Boss is Coming to Dinner UK

The Boss Is Coming to Dinner is an Australian programme, based on the UK version. The series is by Shine Australia for the Nine Network.

The show see three nervous applicants will host a dinner party in their own home to impress their potential employer. After an evening at their homes, the candidates all take part in an employment challenge, where the boss reduces the field from three to two. The top two are then invited to the boss's home for dinner and the final judgement.

On 1 October 2010, Channel Nine dropped the whole series following low ratings, leaving behind some of the remaining unaired episodes.

== Episode Guide ==
No.	Title	Boss	Person hired	Original release date
1	"Episode One"	TBA	TBA	22 September 2010
2	"Episode Two"	TBA	TBA	29 September 2010

== Ratings ==
=== Series 1 ===
Episode	Date Aired	Timeslot	Rating	Nightly Rank	Weekly Rank
1.01	22 September 2010	Wednesday 8:30pm	788,000	18	78
1.02	29 September 2010	Wednesday 8:30pm	646,000	21	83
