= The Big Music Quiz =

- Title card of The Big Music Quiz
- Genre: Game show
- Presented by: Darren McMullen
- Country of origin: Australia
- Original language: English
- No. of seasons: 1
- No. of episodes: 8

Production
- Production locations: Melbourne, Victoria
- Running time: 60 Minutes (Including Commercials)
- Production company: Endemol Shine Australia

Original release
- Network: Seven Network
- Release: 28 August – 12 October 2016

The Big Music Quiz is an Australian television game show based on the French series called Le Grand Blind Test (The Grand Blind Test). The show was hosted by Darren McMullen, and it aired on the Seven Network in 2016. The show pits celebrities together in which they need to answer a range of music trivia challenges, which include identifying original artists of popular cover titles, recognizing song titles played at ten times its normal speed and trying to work out a song sung in a different language.

== Background ==
On 13 March 2016 it was announced that the Seven Network had purchased the local rights for an Australian version of The Big Music Quiz. It was also confirmed that production would start in April with Darren McMullen to present.

Three days after the announcement, an audience call was released. It required enthusiastic audience members willing to stand and dance as part of the show.

== Format ==
The celebrities begin in a warm up (Round 1) where they are tested in their musical knowledge by identifying original artists of popular cover titles. Top scoring celebrities must pick teams which then compete against each other in the following three rounds (2-4)... they are to recognise song titles played at ten times their normal speed, go through a personalised round where they are tested on extracts linked to their career and try to work out a cover version of a song sung in a different language. In the fifth round members from each team go head to head deciphering songs that have been altered in several ways. And in the final round (6), the highest scoring team face off individually against each other... each celebrity in that team must shout out the song titles they hear within the two minutes given.

== Rounds ==
=== Round 1: The Warm Up ===
This round determines Team Captains and their teams. Each of the eight guest panelists plays as individuals and listens to a list of known songs. After the music has played, each panelist writes down the name of the artist; they only have 20 seconds to write down their answer and a "cheat sheet" appears at the 15-second mark. The two panelists highest scoring panelists become Team Captains and then choose their teams in a schoolyard pick.

=== Round 2: Unlikely Covers ===
Each team has 30 seconds to name the original artist of cover songs performed by live guests. The first team to identify the original artist buzzes in (the buzzer cannot be used for the first seven seconds of each song).

=== Round 3: Headphone Heroes ===
The teams must listen to people singing with headphones on. The teams have 30 seconds to buzz in when they can identify the original artist (the buzzer cannot be used for the first seven seconds of each song).

=== Round 4: Personal Playlist ===
Teams must guess the name of the artists in a themed segment which takes musical inspiration from one, or some, of the panelists. The game is played as a team; however, all of the panelists can score points for their team if they get the correct answer. Panelists have access to a cheat sheet for the last five seconds of each track.

=== Round 5: Twisted Tunes ===
In the final team round, a panelist from each team goes head-to-head to identify the original artist. The songs may be harder to identify as they have been twisted, sped up, slowed down, and reversed. The first panelist to buzz in with the correct answer scores the points. The game is played four times so each panelist gets a turn. At the end of this round, the team with the highest score moves into the Final Round while the losing team head off to learn a dance routine to a popular song.

=== Round 6: The Final ===
The winning team now play as individuals. Each player has 60 seconds to guess as many of the original artists as possible. The panelist with the highest score is crowned The Big Music Quiz Champion for the night. The losing team closes the show with their dance routine.

== Episodes ==
No.	Original release date	Australian viewers
1	28 August 2016	1,211,000
Left Team: Kris Smith (Captain), Lawrence Mooney, Giaan Rooney and Emily Taheny (Winner); Right Team: Dave Gleeson (Captain), Melanie Vallejo, Alec Snow and Ella Hooper; Unlikely Covers Guest: The Madin Brothers on Umbrella Bikes
2	4 September 2016	930,000
Left Team: Sam Mac (Captain), Bindi Irwin, Erin Holland and Jai Waetford; Right Team: Ada Nicodemou (Captain), Rebel Wilson, Brendan Jones (Winner) and Adam Garcia; Unlikely Covers Guest: David Balaban on Sitar and Aman Kalyan on Tabla
3	11 September 2016	843,000
Left Team: Joel Creasey (Captain), Lucy Durack, Jimmy Rees (Winner) and Claire Hooper; Right Team: Kate Ceberano (Captain), Em Rusciano, Steve Hooker and Andrew O'Keefe; Unlikely Covers Guest: Justin Brady on Harmonica
4	18 September 2016	873,000
Left Team: Christie Whelan (Captain), Lawrence Mooney, Isabella Giovinazzo and Matt Parkinson; Right Team: Michala Banas (Captain), Jeff Green, Em Rusciano (Winner) and Manu Feildel; Unlikely Covers Guest: Miles Brown on Theremin
5	25 September 2016	842,000
Left Team: Didier Cohen (Captain & Winner), Tim Ross, Kylie Gillies and Matt Cooper; Right Team: Emily Taheny (Captain), Larry Emdur, Denise Scott and Dami Im; Unlikely Covers Guest: A-Capella Band, The Drums of War
6	1 October 2016	887,000
Left Team: Lucy Durack (Captain), Lehmo, Russell Morris (Winner) and Melanie Vallejo; Right Team: Cal Wilson (Captain), Dylan Lewis, Denise Scott and Jude Bolton; Unlikely Covers Guest: Gypsy Sextet Group, The Woohoo Revue
7	2 October 2016	527,000
Left Team: Jackie O (Captain), James Tobin, Rachael Beck and Matthew Mitcham; Right Team: Ella Hooper (Captain), Anthony Albanese (Winner), Libby Trickett and Toby Truslove; Unlikely Covers Guest: New Orleans-Style Brass Band, The Horns of Leroy
8	12 October 2016	562,000
Left Team: Miranda Tapsell (Captain), Tommy Little, Clare Bowditch and Tom Williams; Right Team: Georgie Parker (Captain), Rebel Wilson (Winner), Joel Creasey and Cyrus Villanueva; Unlikely Covers Guest: 11 year old Jeremy Young on Guitar

== Viewership ==
=== Season 1 ===
No.	Title	Air date	Timeslot	Overnight ratings		Consolidated ratings		Total viewers	Ref(s)
No.	Title	Air date	Timeslot	Viewers	Rank	Viewers	Rank	Total viewers	Ref(s)
1	Episode 1	28 August 2016	Sunday 7:30pm	1,211,000	3	41,000	2	1,252,000	
2	Episode 2	4 September 2016	Sunday 7:30pm	930,000	4	27,000	4	957,000	
3	Episode 3	11 September 2016	Sunday 7:30pm	843,000	5	38,000	5	881,000	
4	Episode 4	18 September 2016	Sunday 7:30pm	873,000	4	40,000	4	913,000	
5	Episode 5	25 September 2016	Sunday 7:30pm	842,000	5	54,000	5	896,000	
6	Episode 6	1 October 2016	Saturday 7:30pm	887,000	7	36,000	7	923,000	
7	Episode 7	2 October 2016	Sunday 7:30pm	527,000	8	32,000	8	559,000	
8	Episode 8	12 October 2016	Wednesday 7:30pm	562,000	17	29,000	17	590,000	
