= The Biggest Loser Australia season 11 =

The Biggest Loser Australia
- Season 11
- Starring: Fiona Falkiner (Host); Shannan Ponton; Libby Babet
- No. of episodes: 28

Release
- Original network: Network Ten
- Original release: 14 March – 1 May 2017

Season chronology
- ← Previous; Season 10

The Biggest Loser Australia: Transformed, the eleventh and final season of the Australian version of the original NBC reality television series The Biggest Loser, premiered on 14 March 2017. The live series finale was held on Monday 1 May 2017 at 11 am during the airing of Studio 10.

The season had very low viewership, routinely being beaten not only by rival commercial networks in the ratings, but also rating behind public broadcasters ABC and SBS. After its second week on air, the show was dropped from airing on Sundays nights, continuing only through Monday to Thursday in its third week on air. With continued falling ratings, the program was pulled from prime time and moved to a daytime slot at 1:00 pm (where re-runs previously aired) from 3 April. The live finale aired at 11am on 1 May 2017 and was watched by 92,000 viewers.

== Game variations ==
- Teams: Due to having two trainers this season, the teams will be split into two teams of eight
- Mind Sessions: Each week, the contestants will have "Mind Sessions" with weight management psychologist Glenn Mackintosh where they will discuss their mental and physical wellbeing, including analysing the body image baggage they are carrying around and how it can add up on the scales
- Voting: For the first time, viewers will get to vote during the Live Grand Final
- Winners: There will be two winners. One winner will be based on weight loss (like prior seasons) and will win $50,000. The other will be decided by the viewers who will choose the contestant who has transformed their life the most and that winner will win $100,000.

== Contestants ==
There is slated to be two teams of eight, totaling up to 16 contestants. In week six, the top eight were merged into one team and began to compete as individuals. They were given new black shirts to signify this.

Contestants	Age	Occupation	Team	Singles	Status
Brett	40	Stonemason & Tradesman	Blue Team	Black Player	The Biggest Loser ($50,000)
Lisa-Faye	45	Catering Manager	Orange Team	Black Player	Finalist
Lynton	27	Flight instructor	Blue Team	Black Player	Most Transformed – Australia's Vote Winner ($100,000)
Nikki	25	Full-time Mum	Orange Team	Black Player	Finalist
Sophia	33	Hospitality Waitress	Orange Team	Black Player	Finalist; Originally Eliminated (Week 3), Returned (Week 5)
Simon	34	Sales & Marketing Manager	Orange Team	Black Player	Finalist
Simmo	30	Sales Manager	Blue Team	Black Player	Eliminated (Week 7)
Josh	35	Excavator	Orange Team	Black Player	Originally Eliminated (Week 4), Returned (Week 5), Eliminated (Week 6)
Amy	27	Business Management Advisor	Blue Team	None	Eliminated (Week 6)
Matt	38	Marketing Manager	Blue Team	None	Eliminated (Week 5)
Luke	35	Sales Manager	Orange Team	None	Eliminated (Week 4)
Jake	38	IT Manager & Former Model	Orange Team	None	Eliminated (Week 3)
Steph	36	Teacher	Orange Team	None	Eliminated (Week 2)
Anna	40	Apprentice Butcher	Blue Team	None	Eliminated (Week 2)
Sarah	32	Student Nurse	Blue Team	None	Eliminated (Week 1)
Jenny	60	Intensive Care Paramedic	Blue Team	None	Eliminated (Week 1)

== Weigh-ins ==
Below the Yellow Line & competed in the Arena Challenge The week's biggest loser Had immunity for the week Below the Yellow Line & Eliminated due to Arena Challenge Eliminated before Weigh In due to Elimination Challenge Won a spot in the arena based on Weigh-In (for previously eliminated contestants) Automatic Elimination based on Weigh-In (for previously eliminated contestants) The series' biggest loser and winner of $50,000 The viewer's choice and winner of $100,000
Contestant	Age	Starting weight (kg)	Week								Finale	Weight lost (kg)	Percentage lost
Contestant	Age	Starting weight (kg)	1	2	3	4	5		6	7	Finale	Weight lost (kg)	Percentage lost
Brett	40	116.8	110.4	108.1	103.9	102.3	X	100.4	92.4	91.5	82.5	34.3	29.36%
Lisa-Faye	45	103.5	97.2	94.6	92.2	91.3	X	88.7	82.7	82.0	68.5	35.0	33.81%
Lynton	27	124.2	117.9	115.2	111.4	109.9	X	106.2	99.8	98.0	81.2	43.0	34.62%
Nikki	25	78.1	74.2	72.3	71.4	70.5	X	68.2	65.0	64.7	62.0	16.1	20.61%
Simon	34	108.2	102.3	100.9	97.7	96.8	X	92.9	87.0	86.8	86.6	21.6	19.96%
Sophia	33	106.3	99.7	98.1	N/A		93.4	90.8	84.9	84.0	73.0	33.3	31.33%
Simmo	30	135.0	125.7	121.6	116.4	113.3	X	110.8	100.5	N/A		34.5	25.56%
Josh	35	147.7	138.6	133.7	130.8	N/A	127.6	123.9	115.1*		97.0*	50.7	34.33%
Amy	27	106.0	101.6	99.9	96.4	94.4	X	90.8	N/A			15.2	14.34%
Matt	38	115.3	111.7	109.5	107.1	105.4	X	102.9				12.4	10.75%
Luke	35	123.4	116.6	113.3	109.5	109.9	107.3					16.1	13.05%
Jake	38	122.0	116.9	113.5	111.3		106.5					15.5	12.70%
Steph	36	102.2	95.9	93.8			91.7					10.5	10.27%
Anna	40	117.2	111.3	N/A			101.6				71.2*	46.0	39.25%
Sarah	32	114.5	109.3				106.9				94.5*	20.0	17.47%
Jenny	60	90.4	N/A				81.1					9.3	10.29%

- In week six, Simon had a 1 kg advantage, which resulted in Josh landing in the bottom 5.
- While the eliminated contestants final weights weren't revealed at Finale, in the 'at home' packages during the penultimate episode it was revealed that Sarah had lost 20 kg, Anna was now 71.2 kg, and Josh was now 97 kg.

=== Weight Loss History ===
Amount of kilograms lost/gained per week
Contestant	1	2	3	4	5		6	7	Finale
Brett	–6.4	–2.3	–4.2	–1.6	X	–1.9	–8.0	–0.9	–9.0
Lisa-Faye	–6.3	–2.6	–2.4	–0.9	X	–2.6	–6.0	–0.7	–13.5
Lynton	–6.3	–2.7	–3.8	–1.5	X	–3.7	–6.4	–1.8	–16.8
Nikki	–3.9	–1.9	–0.9	–0.9	X	–2.3	–3.2	–0.3	–2.7
Simon	–5.9	–1.4	–3.2	–0.9	X	–3.9	–5.9	–0.2	–0.2
Sophia	–6.6	–1.6			–4.7	–2.6	–5.9	–0.9	–11.0
Simmo	–9.3	–4.1	–5.2	–3.1	X	–2.5	–10.3		
Josh	–9.1	–4.9	–2.9		–3.2	–3.7	–8.8		–18.1
Amy	–4.4	–1.7	–3.5	–2.0	X	–3.6			
Matt	–3.6	–2.2	–2.4	–1.7	X	–2.5			
Luke	–6.8	–3.3	–3.8	+0.4	–2.6				
Jake	–5.1	–3.4	–2.2		–4.8				
Steph	–6.3	–2.1			–2.1				
Anna	–5.9				–9.7				–30.4
Sarah	–5.2				–2.4				–12.4
Jenny					–9.3				

=== Percentage Loss History ===
Percentage of body weight lost per week
Contestant	1	2	3	4	5		6	7	Finale
Brett	5.48%	2.08%	3.89%	1.54%	X	1.89%	7.97%	0.97%	9.84%
Lisa-Faye	6.09%	2.67%	2.54%	0.98%	X	2.93%	6.76%	0.85%	16.46%
Lynton	5.07%	2.29%	3.30%	1.35%	X	3.48%	6.03%	1.80%	17.14%
Nikki	4.99%	2.56%	1.24%	1.26%	X	3.37%	4.69%	0.46%	4.17%
Simon	5.45%	1.37%	3.17%	0.92%	X	4.20%	6.35%	0.23%	0.23%
Sophia	6.21%	1.60%			4.79%	2.86%	6.50%	1.06%	13.10%
Simmo	6.89%	3.26%	4.28%	2.66%	X	2.26%	9.30%		
Josh	6.16%	3.54%	2.17%		2.45%	2.99%	7.10%		15.73%
Amy	4.15%	1.67%	3.50%	2.07%	X	3.96%			
Matt	3.12%	1.97%	2.19%	1.59%	X	2.43%			
Luke	5.51%	2.83%	3.35%	–0.37%	2.37%				
Jake	4.18%	2.91%	1.94%		4.31%				
Steph	6.16%	2.19%			2.24%				
Anna	5.03%				8.72%				29.92%
Sarah	4.54%				2.20%				11.60%
Jenny					10.29%				

=== Combined Weight Loss & Percentage ===
Combined Team amount
Week	Blue Team		Orange Team	
Week	Loss	Percent	Loss	Percent
Week 1	–41.1	4.96%	–50.0	5.61%
Week 2	–15 (–13 + –2)	2.64%	–16.3	2.32%
Week 3	–20.1 (–19.1 + –1)	3.63%	–15.4	2.45%
Week 4	–9.9	1.85%	3.3 (–2.3 + –1)	0.89%
Week 5	–14.2	2.70%	–15.1	3.15%

- In week 2, The Blue Team received a 2 kg advantage in a challenge
- In week 3, The Blue Team received a 1 kg advantage in a challenge
- In week 4, The Orange Team received a 1 kg advantage in a challenge

== The Power ==
A bracelet given to a challenge winning contestant, team, or the biggest loser for the week. The bracelet holds different powers each week.

Week 1: Immunity – Given to the orange team in the first challenge. All team members had to decide who on their team would receive it. It was given to Nikki.

Week 2: Exclusion of Opposite Team Member – Given to Simmo for being the biggest loser of week 1. He had the power to exclude a member of the orange team from either the team challenge or weigh in. He chose for Josh to sit out of the weigh in, meaning his weight wouldn't count towards the orange team's total.

Week 3: Two Votes – Given to Josh for being the biggest loser of week 2. The power was that if the orange team lost the team challenge and faced elimination, Josh would have two votes. Orange team was sent to elimination and his vote, for Luke, was counted as two votes.

Week 4: Choice of Immunity – Given to Simmo for being the biggest loser of week 3. He had the power to grant someone immunity, anyone, except for himself. He could use it at any point this week and he gave it to Nikki after the elimination challenge.

Week 5: Advantage in Cooking Challenge – Given to Simmo for being the biggest loser of week 4, he has the power to decide who will cook twice for the orange team, he chose Nikki & Simon.

Week 6: Advantage in Running Challenge – Given to Simon for being the biggest loser of week 5. The contestants did a running challenge where at the end of each kilometre they put back on the weight they lost. Simon's power meant that he only had to do 900m for every 1 km the others were doing.

== Elimination Results ==
=== Description ===
Week 1: Jenny – Vote (5–1) – Due to losing the elimination challenge, the blue team was sent to elimination and had to vote for a contestant to leave, Jenny was voted for 5 times with herself voting for Amy, this was enough votes for Jenny to be eliminated, Brett and Lynton's vote were not revealed.

Week 1: Sarah – Elimination Arena – Different from previous seasons, the bottom 3 contestants were sent to the elimination arena where the lowest scoring of the 3 was eliminated. Amy, Matt & Sarah were bottom 3 in Weigh In, they had to face off in 2 rounds, first they had to ride elliptical bike up to 3 km in the fastest time, Matt was the fastest and was safe. In the second round, Amy & Sarah had to ride the same elliptical bike but had to keep above 50RPM, first to drop below was eliminated, meaning Sarah was the first under 50RPM and was eliminated.

Week 2: Anna – Vote (3–1–1–1) – Due to losing the elimination challenge, the blue team was sent to elimination and had to vote for a contestant to leave, Anna was voted for 3 times with herself voting for Brett, she was the only one to receive more than 1 vote meaning she was eliminated, with the other 2 votes each individually going to Amy & Matt

Week 2: Steph – Elimination Arena – Simon, Sophia & Steph were bottom 3 in Weigh In, they had to face off in 2 rounds, first round each had to stand in the centre of six FitLite trainers, they light up in a certain sequence, each contestant had to race over and hit each one to make the next light up over 50 times, Simon was the first one to get through the 50 light sequence and was made safe from elimination. Second round was in two stages; the first stage was a balance beam, with more of the FitLites placed to the side of it. Stop along the way, deactivate the lights with your feet. If you fall off the beam you go back to the start, the second stage was to climb a knotted rope and deactivate another light at the top. Both Sophia & Steph passed the balance beam but neither could climb the rope so it went into sudden death. Sudden Death involved both of the girls placing their feet on the lowest knot of the rope and hang on with first one to fall off being eliminated, Steph was first to fall and was eliminated.

Week 3: Sophia – Votes (3–2–1–1–1) – Due to losing the elimination challenge, the orange team was sent to elimination and had to vote for a contestant to leave, Sophia was voted for 3 times with herself voting for Josh, she received the most votes meaning she was eliminated, Josh's vote counted for two times as he had The Power meaning his vote, for Luke, was counted as 2 votes, the other two votes each individually went to Nikki & Simon

Week 3: Jake – Elimination Arena – Jake, Josh & Nikki were bottom 3 in Weigh In, they had to face off in 2 rounds, first round balance on a hemisphere ball with a small ball balanced on a paddle. If the ball falls off or you fall off the ball, they lose the round, Jake & Nikki were the first two to fall off making Josh safe. In the second round, stand on your toes on a small ledge. First to give up is out of the challenge and out of the competition. Jake was the first to fall off meaning he was eliminated.

Week 4: Josh – Votes (4–1) – Due to losing the elimination challenge, the orange team was sent to elimination and had to vote for a contestant to leave, Josh was voted for 4 times with himself voting for Luke, he received the most votes meaning he was eliminated, Simon's vote was revealed although it wouldn't've affected the outcome.

Week 4: Luke – Elimination Arena – Lisa-Faye, Simon & Luke were bottom 3 in Weigh In, they had to face off in 2 rounds, first round Ride 1 km on an Assalult Bike, Transfer a 40 kg medicine ball from one side to another while trying to balance on blocks and then attempt to keep shooting them until they land them in their frame above them and repeat the process until they have landed all four medicine balls. If they fall off the blocks or drop the ball they must go back to the start, Simon was the first to successfully land all four of his medicine balls making him safe. In the second round, hold the medicine ball above your head. First to drop their ball below their head is out of the challenge and out of the competition. Luke was the first to drop his ball below his head meaning he was eliminated.

Week 5: Josh & Sophia – Salvation Arena – Josh, Anna, Luke, Jake & Sophia were top 5 in Weigh In, they had to face off in 2 rounds Transfer weights from the either middle pole or theirs to their opposition pole while attempting to stay on a balance beam and while trying to keep the weight of their own pole. If they fall off the balance beam or drop the weight they must go back to the start. If their pole runs out of room they lose the round, Anna, Jake, Luke and Sophia were the first to get their poles full meaning Josh Returned. In the second round, hold the dumb bell above your barrier. First three to drop their dumb bell below their barrier is out of the challenge and out of the competition, Josh and Luke were the first two out but after 90 minutes the contest was stepped up a level, Anna and Sophia had to keep their arms extended the whole time and could no longer move their hand around the dump bell, Anna was the last one out meaning Sophia Returned.

=== Results ===
Elimination results
Elimination due to Elimination Arena Elimination due to Elimination Vote Had immunity for the vote Returned to Competition due to Arena Challenge
	Week 1		Week 2		Week 3		Week 4		Week 5			Week 6		Week 7		
Eliminated	Jenny	Sarah	Anna	Steph	Sophia	Jake	Josh	Luke	Josh	Sophia	Matt	Amy	Josh	N/A	N/A	Simmo
Result	5–1	Arena	3–1–1–1	Arena	3–2–1–1–1	Arena	4–1	Arena	Arena	Arena	Arena	2–1–1	Arena	Arena	Arena	Arena
Contestant	Vote	Result	Vote	Result	Vote	Result	Vote	Result	Result	Result	Result	Vote	Result	Result	Result	Result
Brett	Unknown		Anna									Amy		Elimination Round	N/A	Top 6
Lisa-Faye					Sophia		Josh	Safe					Safe	Elimination Round	N/A	Top 6
Lynton	Unknown		Anna								Safe	Simmo	Safe	Qualifying Round	Elimination Round	Top 6
Nikki					Simon	Safe	Josh						Safe	Qualifying Round	Top 6	N/A
Simon				Safe	Sophia		Josh	Safe						Qualifying Round	Elimination Round	Top 6
Sophia				Safe	Josh				Round 2	Returned			Safe	N/A	Top 6	N/A
Simmo	Jenny		Anna								Safe	Amy		Elimination Round	N/A	Eliminated
Josh					Luke x2	Safe	Luke		Returned				Eliminated			
Amy	Jenny	Safe	Matt									Brett				
Matt	Jenny	Safe	Amy								Eliminated					
Luke					Sophia		Josh	Eliminated	Round 2	Eliminated						
Jake					Nikki	Eliminated			Round 2	Eliminated						
Steph				Eliminated												
Anna	Jenny		Brett						Round 2	Eliminated						
Sarah	Jenny	Eliminated														
Jenny	Amy															

== Challenges ==
=== Summary ===
Wk	Ep	Challenge	Location	Prize	Winner(s)
1	1	Kayak race across Sydney Harbour	Sydney Heads	The Power: Immunity	Orange Team (Nikki)
1	2	Cook a healthy version of fried chicken, chips and coleslaw	TBL House Kitchen	2 kg advantage in Elimination Challenge	Blue Team
1	3	Holding weights on their shoulders	South Coast, NSW	Safe from challenge elimination	Orange Team
2	5	Cook sugar-free gut loving wheelies	TBL House Kitchen	Exclusive use of the house gym for a week	Orange Team
2	6	Lift weights to a pontoon and bring to shore	Ku-ring-gai National Park	Safe from challenge elimination	Orange Team
2	7	Relay Challenge	Elimination Arena	2 kg advantage in weigh in	Blue Team
3	9	Prepare a healthy meal that can feed a family of five for just $25	TBL House Kitchen	Chose an Orange Team member to sit out of next challenge	Blue Team
3	10	Obstacle Course	Glenworth Valley, NSW	Safe from elimination	Blue Team
3	11	Head-to-head challenge	Elimination Arena	1 kg advantage in Weigh In	Orange Team
4	13	Cooking Challenge	GWS Giants Kitchen	Advantage in the next challenge	Orange Team
4	14	Totem Pole Challenge	Outside TBL Gym	Safe from Elimination	Blue Team
5	17	Nutrition Challenge	TBL House Kitchen	Spa Treatment	Blue Team
5	19	Health & Fitness Quiz	Outside TBL Gym	Immunity at weigh in for the winning duo	Brett & Lisa-Faye
6	21	Muddy Obstacle Team Challenge		Safe from elimination	Orange Team
6	23	Running Challenge	Elimination Arena	1 kg individual weight advantage in weigh in	Simon

=== Week 1 ===
Episode 1: Kayak Race – Each team had to start at the pier of Q Station, then race down to the beach to retrieve 8 paddles for their kayak (one per team member) with 4 buried in the sand and 4 tied to a buoy in the water. Then the teams had to split into 4 sets of two (except one as they were sick) then had to race 3.5 km across Sydney Heads from North to South, the first team that had all 4 kayaks cross the finish line first won the challenge and received The Power as reward.

Episode 2: Healthy Cooking – Each team had to choose 2 team members from their team to cook a healthy version of fried chicken, chips and coleslaw, Orange Team chose Lisa & Nikki and Blue Team chose Anna & Matt, they had 60 minutes to do so, they had an open pantry to use. The meals were judged by chef Tobie Puttock, who announced Anna & Matt as the winners meaning the Blue Team won and received advantage for the next challenge, which was revealed in the next challenge as a 10 kg advantage.

Episode 3: Elimination Challenge – Each team member had to each choose an amount of weight to each lift on their shoulders to hold for 30 minutes, the team with the most combined amount left after the 30 minutes won the challenge, the Orange Team was the team left with the most weight meaning they won keeping them safe from the challenge elimination.

=== Week 2 ===
Episode 5: Healthy Wagon Wheel – Each team had to make a replica of Sarah Wilson's sugar-free gut loving wheelies, a homage to Wagon Wheel, in a relay challenge, each team member had 15 minutes each to make a part, totalling 1hr & 45 minutes. Sarah was the judge and announced the Orange Team and received exclusive use of the house gym for a week as reward.

Episode 6: Elimination Challenge – Three members of each team were tethered to a chain, they had to duck and weave under each other to untangle the chains and release a pole. Once the pole is released a stack of weights can be shifted, one at a time, to the pontoon on the water. All the weights must be on the pontoon before you can move on. Once all the weight is aboard six team members will wade out to lift and carry the pontoon back to shore. The Orange Team was the first team to finish, making them safe from the elimination.

Episode 7: Relay Challenge – The challenge will be over four rounds, each round competitors will be eliminated until the deciding round. The first round is box jumps! Matt of the blue team comes last and is eliminated. Next round, a minute's worth of shoulder dropping. Pick up a medicine ball onto their shoulder and drop it back down. Jake and Luke of the orange team are the least and are eliminated. Next round is Planks, first three to drop out of the position won't go to round four. Amy, Lynton and Simmo are first to drop out and are eliminated leaving Brett to fight it out against Steph, Sophia and Simon in the final round. The final round is squats, the last person standing is the winner, which was Brett makin blue team the winners.

=== Week 3 ===
Episode 9: $25 meal challenge – The challenge involved 2 members from each team preparing a healthy meal that can feed a family of five for $25. Lisa-faye & Jake (Orange Team) volunteer and Amy & Brett (Blue Team) volunteer and cooked Chicken with Roasted Vegetables and a Salad. Hayden Quinn (of MasterChef Australia) is the judge of the meals and reveals that the Blue Team's meal was the best of the two declaring them the winners, winning an advantage in the next challenge.

Episode 10: Obstacle Course – The challenge involved picking a member of the team to saw through a log. Then pairs will carry two smaller logs through a number of other obstacles. A mud pit, over a dirt mound, over a series of hurdles, across a river and then through a tire course. Once you've cleared the final obstacle you have to put your log upright at the end of the course. When both logs are in position one person runs a bag through the course again, the bag has their team banner inside and they have to display it at the end on the logs. Last to do so will face elimination. As the Orange Team had 2 more members than the Blue Team, The Blue Team had the advantage to keep out one of the Orange's members, they chose Simon, the other was by default as Josh had an injury and had to sit out. The Blue Team were the victors in the challenge and were safe from elimination.

Episode 11: Head-to-Head Challenge – Tie challenge was a Head-to-head competition over five rounds, first to win three rounds gets wins the challenge, they can't use the same person each round, each team will have to pick which person will go in each time. First round was a rope climb, first to scale the rope three times and ring the bell three times will win the round for their team, Jake (orange) & Simmo (blue) competed, Jake was first to finish and won the round. Second round was rowing, first to row 500m won the round, Lisa-Faye (orange) & Lynton (blue) competed, Lynton was first to finish winning the round. Round three was tug-o-war, first to pull the rope across the line won the round, Luke (orange) & Brett (blue) competed, Brett pulled the rope across the line first and won the round. Round four was a barbell raise beep test where they had to lift the bar 5 times in 30 seconds, then 6 times in 30 seconds. It keeps increasing up to 15 in 30 seconds, meaning a lift per 2 seconds, Simon (orange) & Amy (blue) competed, Amy was first to finish and won the round, meaning that blue had won three rounds giving them the challenge win and a 1 kg advantage for weigh in.

== Episodes ==
The Biggest Loser Australia (season 11) overnight ratings, with metropolitan viewership and nightly position
Week	Episode		Original airdate	Timeslot	Viewers^{[a]}	Nightly rank^{[a]}	Source
1	1	"Launch"	14 March 2017	Tuesday 7:30 pm	474,000	#18	
1	2	"First Benchmark Training Session"	15 March 2017	Wednesday 7:30 pm	486,000	#18	
1	3	"Elimination Challenge #1"	16 March 2017	Thursday 7:30 pm	431,000	#18	
2	4	"First Weigh In & Elimination"	19 March 2017	Sunday 7:00 pm	305,000	#15	
2	5	"Wagon Wheel Cooking Challenge"	20 March 2017	Monday 7:30 pm	335,000	—N/a	
2	6	"Elimination Challenge #2"	21 March 2017	Tuesday 7:30 pm	289,000	—N/a	
2	7	"Arena Challenge"	22 March 2017	Wednesday 7:30 pm	374,000	#19	
3	8	"Second Weigh In & Elimination"	27 March 2017	Monday 7:30 pm	284,000	—N/a	
3	9	"$25 Family Meal Challenge"	28 March 2017	Tuesday 7:30 pm	275,000	—N/a	
3	10	"Obstacle Course Challenge"	29 March 2017	Wednesday 7:30 pm	254,000	—N/a	
3	11	"Head-to-Head Challenge"	30 March 2017	Thursday 7:30 pm	317,000	—N/a	
4	12	"Third Weigh In & Elimination"	3 April 2017	Monday 1:00 pm	89,000	—N/a	
4	13	"AFL Training & Cooking Challenge"	4 April 2017	Tuesday 1:00 pm	—N/a		
4	14	"Elimination Challenge"	5 April 2017	Wednesday 1:00 pm	—N/a		
4	15	"Mind Health Equine Session"	6 April 2017	Thursday 1:00 pm	—N/a		
5	16	"Fourth Weigh In & Elimination"	10 April 2017	Monday 1:00 pm	—N/a		
5	17	"Nutrition Cooking Challenge"	11 April 2017	Tuesday 1:00 pm	—N/a		
5	18	"Return of the Eliminated Contestants"	12 April 2017	Wednesday 1:00 pm	—N/a		
5	19	"Immunity Challenge"	13 April 2017	Thursday 1:00 pm	—N/a		
6	20	"Fifth Weigh In & Elimination"	17 April 2017	Monday 1:00 pm	—N/a		
6	21	"Elimination Challenge"	18 April 2017	Tuesday 1:00 pm	—N/a		
6	22	"Makeovers"	19 April 2017	Wednesday 1:00 pm	—N/a		
6	23	"Running Challenge"	20 April 2017	Thursday 1:00 pm	—N/a		
7	24	"Sixth Weigh In & Elimination"	24 April 2017	Monday 1:00 pm	—N/a		
7	25	"Second Benchmark Training Session"	25 April 2017	Tuesday 1:00 pm	—N/a		
7	26	"Final Elimination & Final Weigh In"	26 April 2017	Wednesday 1:00 pm	—N/a		
7	27	"Top 6 at home"	27 April 2017	Thursday 1:00 pm	—N/a		
8	28	"Finale"	1 May 2017	Monday 11:00 am	—N/a		

- ^{a} Ratings data is from OzTAM and represents the live and same day average viewership from the 5 largest Australian metropolitan centres (Sydney, Melbourne, Brisbane, Perth and Adelaide).
