= Paul Dean (clarinetist) =

Australian clarinetist, composer, conductor

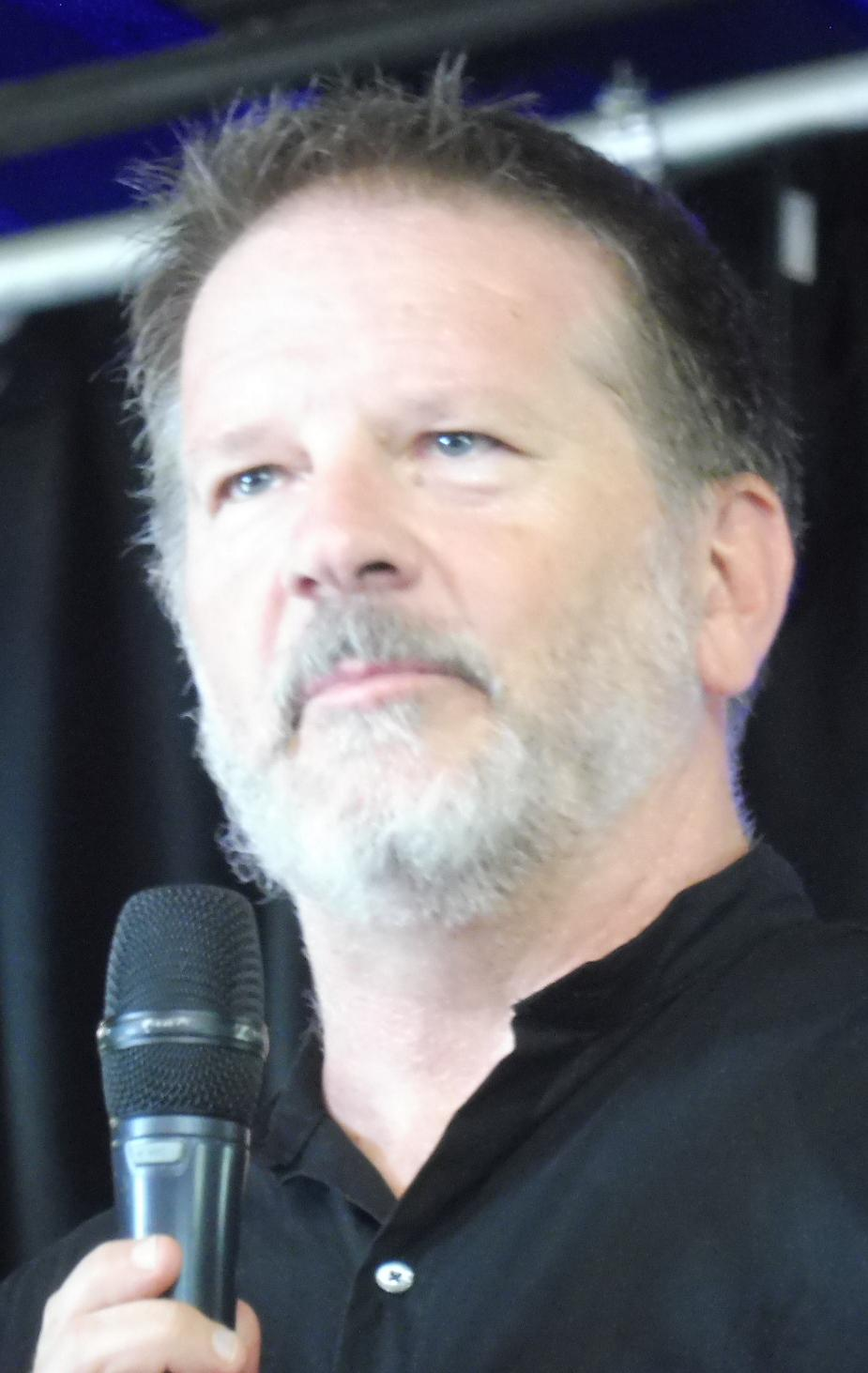
Paul Dean, 2021

Paul Dean (born 1966) is an Australian clarinetist, composer and conductor

== Career ==
Dean was born in Brisbane, Australia. A graduate of the Queensland Conservatorium where he received the Medal of Excellence, Dean won the Australian Clarinet Competition, the Mattara National Concerto Competition, the Coleman Chamber Ensemble Competition in Los Angeles (as a member of the Movellan Wind Quintet).

He often performs together with his brother, the Australian composer, violist and conductor, Brett Dean.

Paul Dean is one of the members of the Southern Cross Soloists, based in Brisbane. As soloist, recitalist and chamber musician, Paul Dean has performed in Norway, England, Japan, the USA and Canada.

From 1987 until 2000 he was principal clarinet with the Queensland Symphony Orchestra.

In 2003 Dean was a soloist with the Adelaide Symphony Orchestra and The Queensland Orchestra. He toured nationally with the Australian String Quartet, playing the Brahms Quintet, Op. 115, and toured New Zealand and the US with the Southern Cross Soloists in the same year.

In 2004 he was a guest artist at the Sydney Festival and the Australian String Quartet’s Bridgewater Mill Series, toured nationally with the Macquarie Trio and performed over 50 concerts throughout Australia with the Southern Cross Soloists.

Described by London’s The Sunday Times as "the excellent Paul Dean", he has toured extensively throughout USA, Asia, Europe and New Zealand. His performance of the Frankel Clarinet Quintet, Op. 28, at the 1997 International Clarinetfest in Lubbock, Texas, won him a standing ovation.

Dean served as the artistic director of Southern Cross Soloists, the SunWater & Stanwell Winter Music School and the Bangalow Music Festival, as well as making regular appearances at festivals throughout Australia. In 2007 he was artistic director of the Bonyi International Youth Music Festival in Brisbane. In 2011 he was appointed the artistic director for Tutti Youth Music Festival Beijing, an international youth music festival dedicated to music education, a position he still holds in 2022.

In 2010, Dean was appointed as artistic director of the Australian National Academy of Music in Melbourne, succeeding his brother Brett Dean in that post. Dean was appointed composer-in-residence by the Melbourne Symphony Orchestra for the 2019 season.

Dean and his wife, cellist Trish (née O'Brien), founded the Brisbane-based chamber group Ensemble Q in 2017.

As a composer, his works include Turmoil, Peace and Celebration for cello and piano (2014). His opera Dry River Run to a libretto by Rodney Hall was premiered in September 2018. In November 2022, he won the Paul Lowin Prize for orchestral composition with his Symphony nr. 1, Black Summer.

As a conductor, Dean has worked with the Queensland Youth Orchestras, and in 2021 he was appointed chief conductor of the Brisbane Symphony Orchestra. He is the Kinnane Professor of Music at the University of Queensland.

== Recordings ==
- 1990: From Fire by Fire, Queensland Wind Soloists
- 1996: Frankel: Chamber Works, Queensland Symphony Chamber players
- 1999: Ariel's Music, with Queensland Symphony Orchestra and Richard Mills
- 2006: Night Window, with Brett Dean and Stephen Emmerson (nominated for Best Classical Album at the ARIA Music Awards of 1999)
- 2009: Sublime Mozart: Works for Clarinet, Paul Dean, Grainger Quartet, The Queensland Orchestra, Guillaume Tourniaire (conductor): Mozart: Clarinet Concerto, K. 622; Clarinet Quintet, K. 581
  (Melba MR 301122)
- 2012: The Romantic Clarinet, with Stephen Emmerson (Melba MR 301138)
- 2013: Music for Clarinet and Orchestra, with Queensland Symphony Orchestra and Richard Mills (ABC 476 4465)
