= List of Macquarie University people =

This is a list of Macquarie University people.

== Academia and science ==
Name	Macquarie University qualifications or faculty role	Notability	Notes
Janine Deakin	BSc (Honours), PhD in Biology	Australian geneticist and a professor at the University of Canberra	

== Business ==
Name	Macquarie University qualifications or faculty role	Notability	Notes
Rodney Adler		Australian businessman and former HIH director	
Matt Barrie	MAppFin	Australian businessman	
Peter Bush	BA	Australian businessman, Chairman of Pacific Brands and a director of Insurance Australia Group, former CEO of McDonald's Australia and former Chair of Nine Entertainment	
Greg Coffey	BEcon	Australian hedge fund manager	
David Leckie		Australian businessman and former CEO of Seven West Media	
Catherine Livingstone	BA (Hons)	Australian businesswoman and President of the Business Council of Australia, the Chairwoman of Telstra and a Director of Macquarie Group and Worley	
David Murray	MBA	Australian businessman, former CEO of the Commonwealth Bank and Chairman of the Future Fund Board of Guardians	
Napoleon Perdis		Australian makeup artist and businessman	
Stephen Ting	BEcon	Hong Kong businessman and CEO of Next Media	

== Government and politics ==
=== Australia ===
- Peter Andren, Australian politician, former Member for Calare in the Australian House of Representatives
- Kerry Bartlett, Australian politician, former Member for Macquarie in the Australian House of Representatives
- Meredith Burgmann, Australian politician, former President of the New South Wales Legislative Council
- Sam Dastyari, Australian politician, former Senator representing New South Wales
- Peter Debnam, Australian politician, former NSW Leader of the Opposition and member of the New South Wales Legislative Assembly representing Vaucluse
- Victor Dominello, Australian politician, Minister in the O'Farrell, Baird, Berejiklian and Perrottet ministries
- Trish Doyle, Australian politician, member of the New South Wales Legislative Assembly for the electorate of Blue Mountains
- Harry Edwards, Australian politician and economist
- John Faulkner, Australian politician, former Senator representing New South Wales
- John Hewson AM, Australian politician and former leader of the Liberal Party of Australia
- Stephen Jones, Australian politician, Minister in the Albanese government
- Mike Kelly AM, Australian politician, Minister in the Gillard and Rudd governments
- David Leyonhjelm, Australian politician, former Senator representing New South Wales
- Jann McFarlane, Australian politician, former Member for Stirling in the Australian House of Representatives
- Sally McManus, Australian union leader, Secretary of the Australian Council of Trade Unions
- Tania Mihailuk, Australian politician, member of the New South Wales Legislative Council and former member of the New South Wales Legislative Assembly
- Rev. Fred Nile, Australian politician, former member of the New South Wales Legislative Council
- Rob Oakeshott, Australian politician, former Member for Lyne in the Australian House of Representatives
- Jamie Parker, Australian politician, former member of the New South Wales Legislative Assembly representing Balmain
- Tanya Plibersek, Australian politician, Minister in the Rudd, Gillard and Albanese governments
- Steven Pringle, former member of the New South Wales Legislative Assembly
- Eric Roozendaal, Australian politician, Minister in the Iemma, Rees, and Keneally ministries
- Janelle Saffin, Australian politician, Member of the New South Wales Legislative Assembly and former Member for Page in the Australian House of Representatives
- Carl Scully, Australian politician, Minister in the Carr government
- Helen Sham-Ho OAM, Australian politician, former Member of the New South Wales Legislative Council
- Lisa Singh, Australian politician, former Senator representing Tasmania
- Jim Soorley, Australian politician, former Lord Mayor of Brisbane
- Karin Sowada, Australian politician, former Senator representing New South Wales
- Rob Stokes, Australian politician, Minister in the O'Farrell, Baird, Berejiklian and Perrottet ministries

=== International ===
Name	Macquarie University qualifications or faculty role	Notability	Notes
Maliina Abelsen	MPol, AppSocRes	Greenlandic politician, Finance minister of Greenland	
Patricia Holmes		Australian diplomat, former Australian Ambassador to Argentina	
Martin Indyk		American academic and former diplomat, United States Ambassador to Israel	
Freddie Pitcher		Nauruan politician, former President of Nauru	
David Stuart		Australian diplomat, former Australian Ambassador to Austria	
Harini Amarasuriya	MA in Applied and Development Anthropology	Sri Lankan politician, Prime Minister of Sri Lanka	
Rose Mwebaza	PhD, Environment and Natural Resource Governance	Uganda lawyer	

=== Other ===
- Peter Anderson, Australian former police minister and former Director of the Centre for Policing
- John Avery, Australian Chief Commissioner of the New South Wales Police Force
- Alison Broinowski, Australian academic, journalist, writer and former Australian public servant
- John Connor, Australian chief executive of Climate Institute of Australia
- Kathryn Greiner, Australian politician, alderman of the City of Sydney
- Frank Howarth, Australian public servant; former Director of the Australian Museum
- Greg Lindsay, Australian founder and executive director of the Centre for Independent Studies
- Judy Mundey, Australian feminist and activist
- Cameron Murphy AM, Australian civil libertarian
- Christine Nixon, Australian former Chief Commissioner of Victoria Police and Chair, Monash College and Deputy Chancellor, Monash University
- Kathryn Paterson, Australian New Zealand public servant
- Andrew Scipione, Australian Chief Commissioner of the New South Wales Police Force
- Patricia Scott, Australian public servant
- Jeannette Young, Australian medical doctor and Chief Health Officer of Queensland

== Arts ==
Name	Macquarie University qualifications or faculty role	Notability	Notes
Rosemary Blight		Australian film producer	
Murray Cook		Australian musician, founding member of The Wiggles	
Nevill Drury	MA (Hons)	Australian writer	
Anthony Field		Australian musician, founding member of The Wiggles	
Adam Hills		Australian comedian	
Linda Klarfeld		Czech Australian sculptor	
Chris Lilley	BA	Australian comedian	
Jennifer Maiden		Australian poet	
Greg Page		Australian musician, founding member of The Wiggles	

- Thea Astley AO, Australian writer, four time Miles Franklin Award winner
- Boey Kim Cheng, Singapore-born Australian poet
- Timothy Hawkes OAM, Australian educator and writer, headmaster of The King's School, Parramatta
- Paul Kraus, Australian writer
- Jeni Mawter, Australian writer
- Liane Moriarty, Australian writer
- Şahînê Bekirê Soreklî, Kurdish writer
- Kimberley Starr, Australian writer
- Les Wicks, Australian poet

== Media ==
Name	Macquarie University qualifications or faculty role	Notability	Notes
Rachael Carpani		Australian film actress, television actress	
Sophie Falkiner		Australian television presenter	
Yalda Hakim		Australian television presenter and news presenter	
Margaret Pomeranz		Australian film critic	

- Jane Caro, Australian writer
- Anja Coleby, Australian model, television actress, television producer
- Miranda Devine, Australian journalist
- Michael Duffy, Australian journalist, writer, radio presenter
- Martin Flood, Australian quiz show contestant, top prize winner on Australia's Who Wants to Be a Millionaire?
- Kate Forsyth, Australian writer and journalist
- Hugh Mackay AO, Australian journalist, novelist, psychologist and sociologist
- Robert Ovadia, Australian journalist and television presenter
- Peter Overton, Australian journalist and television presenter
- Hugh Riminton, Australian journalist and television presenter
- Magdalena Roze, Australian meteorologist and television presenter
- Shane Smith, Australian-Canadian film festival programmer and television producer
- Keith Windschuttle, Australian historian and writer, editor of Quadrant
- Irfan Yusuf, Australian social commentator and writer

== Law ==
- Lloyd Babb SC, Australian barrister and NSW Director of Public Prosecutions
- Jayne Jagot, Australian judge, Judge of the Federal Court of Australia
- Lindy Jenkins, Australian judge, Justice of the Supreme Court of Western Australia
- Brian Preston SC, Australian judge, Chief Justice of the Land and Environment Court of New South Wales

== Religion ==
- Paul Barnett, Australian Anglican bishop, historian and biblical scholar
- Graham Joseph Hill, academic at the University of Divinity
- Tony Nichols, Australian Anglican bishop

== Sport ==
- Grant Brits, Australian swimmer
- Christine Jensen Burke, Australian-New Zealand mountain climber
- Liz Ellis, Australian netball player, former captain of Australian netball team
- Rachael Gunn, Australian Olympian and academic
- Patrik Hefti, Liechtenstein association football player
- Lauren Jackson, Australian basketball player
- Holly Lincoln-Smith, Australian water polo player
- Joel Milburn, Australian athlete
- Ian Thorpe, Australian swimmer (attended)
- Tom Trbojevic, rugby league player, currently playing for Manly Sea Eagles
- Melissa Wu, Australian diver

== Administration ==
=== Chancellor ===
Order	Chancellor	Years	Notes
1	Sir Garfield Barwick AK, GCMG, QC	1967–1978	
2	Percy Partridge AC	1978–1984	
3	Michael Kirby AC, CMG	1984–1993	
4	Tim Besley AC	1994–2001	
5	Maurice Newman AC	2002–2008	
6	Michael Egan AO	2008–2019	
7	Martin Parkinson AC, PSM	2019–present	

=== Deputy Chancellor ===
Order	Name	Title	Years	Notes
1	John Lincoln AM	Deputy Chancellor	1976–2000	
1	John Lincoln AM	Emeritus Deputy Chancellor	2000–2011	

=== Vice-Chancellors ===
Order	Chancellor	Years	Notes
1	Alexander Mitchell	1965–1975	
2	Edwin Webb	1976–1986	
3	Dianne Yerbury AO	1987–2006	
4	Steven Schwartz AM	2006–2012	
5	S Bruce Dowton	2012–present	

== Other faculty ==
Notable past and current faculty members include:

- Wally Abraham, Australian architect and town planner
- Deidre Anderson, Australian sports psychologist and Deputy Vice-Chancellor
- Joan Beck, Egyptian archaeology, Honorary Fellow of Macquarie University
- David Christian, British-American historian
- Max Coltheart AM, Australian cognitive scientist and academic at Macquarie University
- Raewyn Connell, Australian sociologist
- Stephen Crain, American-Australian linguist
- Paul Davies, British physicist, writer and broadcaster
- Patrick De Deckker (de), Australian paleontologist
- William Dumbrell, Australian biblical scholar
- Tim Flannery, Australian mammalogist, palaeontologist, environmentalist and global warming activist
- Jacqueline Jarrett Goodnow, Australian cognitive psychologist
- Jenny Hammond, Australian linguist
- Anita Heiss, Australian writer, presenter and commentator
- Ann Henderson-Sellers, Australian climatologist
- Ian Hogbin, British-born Australian anthropologist
- Bryan Horrigan, Australian legal academic
- Geoffrey Hull, Australian linguist
- Sohail Inayatullah, Pakistani-Australian futurologist
- Naguib Kanawati, Egyptian-Australian Egyptologist
- Daniel Kane, Australian linguist
- Konrad Kwiet, German Australian historian
- Marion Maddox, Australian writer, academic and political commentator
- Richard Makinson, Australian physicist
- Gabriele Marranci, Italian anthropologist
- John Mathews, Australian competitive dynamics and global strategist
- Christian Matthiessen, Swedish linguist
- Pat Michie, Australian neuroscientist/psychologist and academic at Newcastle University
- B. K. Misra, neurosurgeon
- Michael Morgan AO, Australian neurosurgeon
- José Enrique Moyal, Israeli-Australian mathematician
- Alanna Nobbs, Australian historian and writer
- Marlene Norst, Austrian Australian linguist
- Boyo Ockinga, Australian Egyptologist, epigrapher, and philologist
- Suzanne O'Reilly, Australian geologist
- Brian Orr, Australian physicist
- Pam Peters, Australian linguist
- Josef Pieprzyk, Polish-Australian cryptologist
- Ingrid Piller, Australian linguist
- Jim Piper AM, New Zealand-Australian physicist
- Andrew Pitman, British atmospheric scientist
- Arthur William Pryor, Australian physicist
- Murry Salby, American atmospheric scientist
- Leonie Sandercock, Canadian Australian urban theorist
- Patricia Margaret Selkirk, Australian biologist
- David Skellern AO, Australian electronic engineer and computer scientist
- Christina Slade, Australian academic and vice-chancellor of Bath Spa University
- Ross Street, Australian mathematician and Fellow of the Australian Mathematical Society
- Keith Suter, Australian social scientist
- Esther Szekeres, Hungarian–Australian mathematician
- David Throsby AO, Australian economist
- Andrew Tink AM, Australian former politician, writer and legal academic
- Alfred van der Poorten, Dutch Australian mathematician and Fellow of the Australian Mathematical Society
- John Veevers, Australian geologist
- Neil Weste, Australian inventor and engineer
- Clive Williams, British Australian political scientist
