= Clive Williams =

Clive Williams may refer to:

- Clive Williams (rugby union) (born 1947), Welsh rugby union player
- Clive Williams (professor) (born 1945), British-born former Australian Army military intelligence officer and academic
- Clive Andrew Williams (1915–1980), Aboriginal Australian political activist
