= Lorna Fejo =

Australian activist (1930–2022)

Lorna Fejo in 2009

Lorna "Nanna Nungala" Fejo (14 June 1930 – 25 February 2022) was a Warumungu woman who worked in Indigenous health in the Northern Territory of Australia, including the development of a program called "Strong women, Strong Babies and Strong Culture". As a member of the Stolen Generations, having been removed from her family as a young child, she was named by Prime Minister Kevin Rudd, in his historic Apology to the Stolen Generations on 13 February 2008.

== Early life and education ==
Lorna "Nanna Nungala" Fejo was born on 14 June 1930 to an Aboriginal mother and white father.

At four years of age, Lorna Fejo was forcibly removed from her family and community at Tennant Creek along with her sister, brother, and older cousin, by an Aboriginal stockman and two white men. She never again saw her mother, who died before Fejo was able to leave institutional care. Fejo was initially sent to The Bungalow (in Alice Springs), and was later sent to Methodist missions on Goulburn Island and then Croker Island along with her sister. Her brother and cousin were sent to work at a cattle station and a Catholic mission respectively.

After Darwin had been bombed by Japanese planes in World War II, Fejo was evacuated to Sydney via Oenpelli and Pine Creek. In Sydney she attended first Haberfield Primary School, before being moved to Otford to join other children from Croker Island, where she attended the Wollongong High School. After the war she returned to Croker Island, and received further schooling (3rd year high school) by Mr Greentree. She also helped to teach the youngest children, and she enjoyed this time. She was then moved to Darwin to live at the Methodist Overseas Mission, before being allowed to leave the mission at age sixteen to take a domestic job in Darwin.

== Career ==
Fejo undertook many cleaning jobs, including at schools, a remand home, and then Darwin Hospital at Larrakeyah. After marriage in 1951 the couple moved into a shack at Stuart Park in Darwin, before eventually becoming the fourth family receive a 2-bedroom Housing Commission house at Rapid Creek in Darwin.

She and the children were evacuated to Adelaide, South Australia, after Cyclone Tracy in December 1974, where they stayed until mid 1975, when they returned to Rapid Creek. Fejo returned to work at Darwin Hospital until being transferred to the newly-opened Royal Darwin Hospital in 1978.

John Mathews at the new Menzies School of Health selected Fejo as an Indigenous person who could communicate effectively with other Indigenous people in the field of health. She soon learnt much about health and health services and was able to impart valuable knowledge to others, and trained local women. During this time she developed the "Strong women, Strong Babies and Strong Culture" program.

Fejo retired from the Health Department in 1998, but continued to play a role in the health education of Indigenous people as a consultant for several more years, including developing palliative care services for Indigenous Australians.

== Honours and recognition ==
In 1998, an article in the Medical Journal of Australia said:

Lorna played a major role in communicating the health priorities and values of Aboriginal people to non-Aboriginal researchers, to facilitate research projects in a culturally appropriate manner, and to work with other Aboriginal people to show how knowledge and research findings can be fed back to communities and applied to achieve practical health benefits.

In 1998 Fejo was given the Australian Medical Association's Best Individual Contribution to Healthcare in Australia Award, for her contribution as the coordinator of the Strong Women, Strong Babies, Strong Culture program in the Northern Territory.

In 2000 Fejo was awarded the Centenary Medal, for services to the Aboriginal community.

Also in 2000, she was awarded the Australian Achiever Award for her contribution to the "Strong Women" program.

In 2008 Fejo was named by the Prime Minister of Australia, Kevin Rudd, in his historic Apology to the Stolen Generations, on 13 February 2008.

== Personal life ==
She married Larrakia man James (Jimmy) Fejo on at the Methodist Church on 29 April 1951, and moved into a shack at Stuart Park. They had 11 children in total, of whom 7 survived: Rosemary, Christine, Rodney, Aleeta, Eric, Mirella and Richard Fejo.

In 1973 Fejo became a member of the Church of Jesus Christ of Latter-day Saints.

She was the last remaining elder for the Yapayapa group, and continued to return to Country in Tennant Creek for ceremonies and to teach the younger generation their cultural heritage, such as finding and using bush tucker.

== Death and legacy ==
Fejo died on 25 February 2022, at the age of 91.

The "Strong women, Strong Babies and Strong Culture" continued long after her retirement, earning the Charles Darwin Research & Innovation Award in September 2009.
