= Margaret Pomeranz =

Australian film critic (born 1944)

Margaret Pomeranz AM
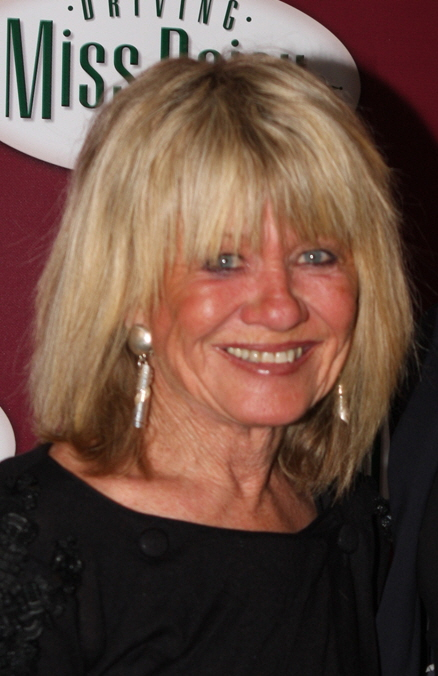
- Pomeranz in 2013
- Born: Margeret Anne Jones-Owen; 15 July 1944 (age 82); Waverley, New South Wales, Australia
- Education: Presbyterian Ladies' College, Sydney; Macquarie University; National Institute of Dramatic Art
- Occupation: Film critic
- Employer: Australian Broadcasting Corporation
- Known for: Film critic; television personality; producer; writer
- Board member of: Advertising Standards Board; Film Critics Circle of Australia; Watch on Censorship; Australian Writers' Foundation
- Spouse: Hans Pomeranz
- Children: 2

Margaret Pomeranz AM (born Margeret Anne Jones-Owen, 15 July 1944) is an Australian film critic, writer, producer, and television personality. She is known for her collaboration with film critic David Stratton, hosting The Movie Show on SBS Television from 1986 until 2004, and then, for the following 10 years, co-hosting ABC Television's film program, At the Movies, and the pair were subsequently appointed to various roles together, such as being patrons of the Adelaide Film Festival. She has also appeared as herself in several Australian comedy programs, such as The Weekly with Charlie Pickering, and in various cameo roles. She appeared as a judge in several episodes of the 2026 reboot of the ABC program Race Around the World, in which young filmmakers competed by making ten films over ten weeks.

== Early life and education ==
Pomeranz was born Margeret Anne Jones-Owen on 15 July 1944 in Waverley, a suburb of Sydney.

She did her schooling at the Presbyterian Ladies' College, Sydney in Croydon. She developed a love of cinema at an early age, being a regular attendee at her local cinema's Saturday afternoon matinée screenings, which included a double feature, short film, and serial.

Pomeranz enrolled for an engineering degree at the University of Sydney, but, after deciding that she was more interested in the arts and humanities, switched to a Bachelor of Arts degree in German and social psychology at the newly-opened Macquarie University.

Her German studies led her to travel to Vienna, where she spent two-and-a-half years. There, she worked as a stringer for The Bulletin and ABC Rural Radio. She wrote stories about such things as Australian sales to Hungarian farmers, and the effects of the Russian wheat crop failing. Returning to Australia in 1971, having been strongly influenced by European intellectualism and its related philosophical freedom, she completed her degree at Macquarie before enrolling in a screenwriting course at the Playwrights' Studio at the National Institute of Dramatic Art (NIDA).

== Career ==
Pomeranz joined the Special Broadcasting Service (SBS) in 1980 as writer and producer, working as executive producer on TV programs such Front Up and Subsonics, and the AFI and IF Awards.

=== With David Stratton ===
Pomeranz was appointed producer for David Stratton's film presentations, and, after being convinced by senior management and Stratton to take on a co-hosting role on The Movie Show as a short-term arrangement, continued in that role from its launch on 30 October 1986 until 2004. From 1 July 2004 she appeared on the ABC Television version of the program, At the Movies, again with Stratton, concluding on 9 December 2014.

Two articles which analysed their reviews at SBS and ABC showed that Stratton was generally a slightly harsher critic than Pomeranz. At SBS, they both gave five stars to only four films: Evil Angels (1988), Return Home (1990), The Piano (1993), and Lantana (2001). At the ABC, they both gave five stars to only six films: Brokeback Mountain (2005), Good Night, and Good Luck (2005), No Country for Old Men (2007), Samson and Delilah (2009), A Separation (2011), and Amour (2012). They disagreed particularly on Romper Stomper (David refusing to rate it because of the racist violence in the film), The Castle (1997), Last Train to Freo (2006), Human Touch (2004), and Kenny (2006), with Stratton awarding fewer stars than Pomeranz on all but Human Touch.

She has been described as "a great Ginger Rogers to David’s Fred Astaire (he gave her class, she gave him sex appeal, etc etc)."

=== Watch on Censorship ===
Pomeranz is also an anti-censorship campaigner. Watch on Censorship was created by a group of journalists, lawyers, and people working in film-related occupations, at a public meeting held at the Chauvel Cinema in Sydney in 1996, to counter what they saw as increasing tightening of the censorship of films and other media in Australia. It became an incorporated body, with the aim "to protect and promote the rights of adult Australians to freedom of speech and expression in all media". Pomeranz was for years chair and vice-chair of Watch on Censorship, before it disbanded in November 2012.

She was a prominent attendee and was briefly detained by police at an attempted 2003 protest screening of the controversial film Ken Park, banned in Australia. She has been critical of the Australian Office of Film and Literature Classification (now the Australian Classification Board), the Australian censorship body, on a number of occasions.

=== Other activities ===
Pomeranz was president of the Film Critics Circle of Australia, served on the Advertising Standards Bureau and was a member of the inaugural Australian Writers' Foundation. In 2015, she became an ambassador for the National Film and Sound Archive of Australia, to raise awareness about the need to preserve Australia's audio-visual cultural heritage.

On 29 January 2015, it was announced that Pomeranz had signed with Foxtel to present film and television programs on Foxtel Arts, along with Graeme Blundell, in a new series called Screen. Screen stopped production in 2020, and past episodes are available on YouTube.

In July 2022, Pomeranz appeared in a ticketed public event at ACMI in conversation with filmmaker Warwick Thornton.

Pomeranz has appeared regularly on The Weekly with Charlie Pickering as a guest reviewer giving humorous reviews of TV shows, such as Married at First Sight Below Deck, Love in the Jungle and cast member Tom Gleeson's show, Hard Quiz

As of 2026 she continues to recommend films screened on SBS on Demand, under the moniker "Margaret Pomeranz Presents".

In 2026 Pomeranz was one of a panel of three judges for several episodes, including the 10th and final one, of Race Around the World, in which the short films of six young filmmakers were judged over ten episodes.

== Recognition and honours ==
Pomeranz is an approved critic on the film review aggregator website Rotten Tomatoes.

Pomeranz was made a Member of the Order of Australia in the 2005 Australia Day Honours, for "service to the film industry as a critic and reviewer, promoter of Australian content, and advocate for freedom of expression in film".

In 2011, to mark 25 years of their partnership on television, ACMI in Melbourne hosted an exhibition titled Margaret and David: 25 Years Talking Movies.

In 2015, Pomeranz and Stratton were named patrons of the French Film Festival in Australia.

On 13 April 2016, Pomeranz and Stratton were both awarded honorary doctorates (Doctor of Letters) at Macquarie University, for their contribution to the film industry

In 2017, Pomeranz became the first woman to be honoured with a star on Winton's Walk of Fame during The Vision Splendid Outback Film Festival in Winton, Queensland.

Pomeranz and Stratton received the Don Dunstan Award in 2018 and were both Patrons of the Adelaide Film Festival.

In May 2023, Pomeranz was awarded an honorary doctorate (Letters) from the University of Sydney "for her impact on popular culture, film and performing arts".

=== Ongoing legacy ===
"David and Margaret" have become icons in Australia. Film critic and comedians Alexei Toliopoulos rates Pomeranz "my actual hero of all time". In April 2025, he and Zachary Ruane created a new show for the Melbourne International Comedy Festival, titled Refused Classification, based on her arrest in 2003.

== Cameos ==
Pomeranz had an uncredited role in the 1994 film The Adventures of Priscilla, Queen of the Desert as the mother of Adam (played by Guy Pearce).

She has also appeared as herself in several Australian comedy programs and promotions, including:

- 1993 Australian comedy film Hercules Returns
- Australian sketch comedy show Full Frontal in a 1995 episode
- A 2000 episode of Australian comedy show Pizza, a show known for celebrity cameos
- Lawrence Leung's Choose Your Own Adventure (2009), where she and Stratton review Lawrence Leung's attempt to set a world record for solving the Rubik's Cube whilst sky diving, as they sit on the landing site in their trademark armchairs
- A 2010 video promoting the new Triple J breakfast team of Tom Ballard and Alex Dyson, where she joined the two men to "satisfy the female demographic"

== Personal life ==
While in Vienna in the middle of her studies around 1969-70, Pomeranz had a significant relationship with Austrian Jewish man named Peter Rindl, an Austrian Jew who had joined the French Resistance and was awarded a medal by French president Charles de Gaulle. She later said that it was he who encouraged her to believe in herself. She had intended to return to him after finishing her degree in Australia.

However, a friend in Austria had asked her to transport a Viennese sachertorte back to Australia and give it to a relative, who turned out to be Hans Pomeranz, then a successful young film editor who was in the throes of making a film. He had founded the post-production studio Spectrum Films in 1964/5, which has been a significant force in the Australian film industry. He and Margaret went to the cinema a lot, both being fans of French and Italian new wave films by directors such as Truffaut and Fellini. They married after she had enrolled at NIDA. Hans was a Dutch Jew, who had spent most of World War II separated from his parents. They remained married for many years after separating in 1984, maintaining close family ties and co-parenting their two sons. Hans received a Medal of the Order of Australia in 2004, "for service to the film industry, particularly as a supporter of emerging film makers, and to the community". He died in 2007, having had his life extended by a heart transplant 13 years earlier.

Their two sons, Josh and Felix, followed their parents into the film industry, with their wives also involved. Josh became general manager of Spectrum in 1998. As of August 2026, he is managing director of the company. Felix, works in visual effects, and is based with his family in England and Wales.

Pomeranz and Stratton were close friends as well as colleagues, with Pomeranz saying that they had "probably only had two disagreements in all those years – both about films".

== See also ==
- Censorship in Australia
- 2004 in Australian television
- List of Old Girls of PLC Sydney
- List of Macquarie University people
