= List of Hard Quiz episodes =

Episodes of Australian quiz show

Hard Quiz is an Australian television comedy quiz show which premiered on the Australian Broadcasting Corporation (ABC) on 19 October 2016. Hosted by Tom Gleeson, the show is a spin-off of his "Hard Chat" segment on the satirical television news program The Weekly with Charlie Pickering. It is filmed at the ABC Melbourne studios in Southbank in front of a studio audience.

== Series overview ==
Series	Episodes	Originally released	
Series	Episodes	First released	Last released
1	10	19 October 2016	21 December 2016
2	18	2 August 2017	29 November 2017
3	22	21 February 2018	30 January 2019
4	20 + 1 Special	6 February 2019	2 October 2019
5	40 + 1 Special	5 February 2020	10 February 2021
6	35 + 1 Special	17 February 2021	22 December 2021
7	24 + 1 Special	2 February 2022	21 December 2022
8	30 + 1 Special	8 February 2023	20 December 2023
9	34 + 1 Special	7 February 2024	18 December 2024
10	33 + 1 Special	29 January 2025	17 December 2025
11	TBA	7 January 2026	TBA

== Episodes ==
=== Series 1 (2016) ===
Names in Bold are the winners

No.	Title	Original release date	Australian viewers
1	"Episode 1"	19 October 2016	681,000
Contestants: Sue – Flags expert Liz – Brat Pack expert Miles – Doctor Who expert **Mark – British Army Field Marshals expert** Tom's round: Tom's subject – Burke & Wills
2	"Episode 2"	26 October 2016	532,000
Contestants: Lucy – Wars of the Roses expert James – Military aviation Expert; Pierre – Punk rock expert **Renae – Richard Gasquet expert** Tom's round: Tom's subject – Greek alphabet Note: This episode features the first ever "hard-off" and the first ever 3-way "hard-off".
3	"Episode 3"	2 November 2016	595,000
Contestants: Nicolas – Seinfeld expert Steve – Capital Cities expert **Alan – Michael Collins expert** Lara – The Human Body expert Tom's round: Tom's subject – Corporate Scandals
4	"Episode 4"	9 November 2016	634,000
Contestants: Frances – The Simpsons expert Duncan – Beethoven expert Allan – Cold Chisel expert **Cherie – Australian medical inventions expert** Tom's round: Tom's subject – The Moon
5	"Episode 5"	16 November 2016	572,000
Contestants: **Jason – Nintendo expert** Andy – World War II Aircraft expert Michael – Summer Olympics expert Holly – Eurovision expert Tom's round: Tom's subject – Capital punishment
6	"Episode 6"	23 November 2016	593,000
Contestants: Wes – Oscar-Winning Film Directors expert **Joanna – The Beatles expert** Joel – Australian Prime Ministers expert Michelle – Microbes expert Tom's round: Tom's subject – Submarines
7	"Episode 7"	30 November 2016	592,000
Contestants: Elyce – Australian comedy expert Paul – FIFA World Cup expert **Tom – Wombats expert** Nathan – The Chronicles of Narnia expert Tom's round: Tom's subject – Fad diets
8	"Episode 8"	7 December 2016	543,000
Contestants: Angie – J. R. R. Tolkien expert **Sebastian – Elton John expert** David – Renaissance art expert Mac – Frasier expert Tom's round: Tom's subject – Australian Stamps
9	"Episode 9"	14 December 2016	632,000
Contestants: **Sally – Harry Potter expert** TK – 1980s computers expert Josh – Australian Reality Television expert Claus – Charles Darwin expert Tom's round: Tom's subject – Cannabis
10	"Episode 10"	21 December 2016	553,000
Contestants: Kim – Downton Abbey expert Kieren – Cricket expert **Rowena – The Brady Bunch expert** Daniel – European languages expert Tom's round: Tom's subject – Paris

=== Series 2 (2017) ===
Names in Bold are the winners

No.	Title	Original release date	Australian viewers
11	"Episode 1"	2 August 2017	643,000
Contestants: **Zoe – Princess Diana expert** Walter – Friends expert Peter – Apollo program expert Andrew – Banknotes expert Tom's round: Tom's subject – Extreme Sports
12	"Episode 2"	9 August 2017	631,000
Contestants: Ed – South Park expert **Simon – Titanic expert** Sam – wives of Henry VIII expert Rebecca – Matthew Reilly expert Tom's round: Tom's subject – Bees
13	"Episode 3"	16 August 2017	646,000
Contestants: Peter – Queen Victoria expert Caroline – Simon & Garfunkel expert **Jamie – Thomas the Tank Engine expert** Nick – Rachmaninoff expert Tom's round: Tom's subject – Chess
14	"Episode 4"	23 August 2017	683,000
Contestants: Alex – Astronomy expert **Andrew – Hawke & Keating expert** Lyn – South Sydney Rabbitohs expert Alex – The Princess Bride expert Tom's round: Tom's subject – RSPCA
15	"Episode 5"	30 August 2017	668,000
Contestants: Robyn – Tom Hanks expert Conan – George Orwell expert **Peter – Australian venomous animals expert** James – Commercial Aviation expert Tom's round: Tom's subject – Gambling
16	"Episode 6"	6 September 2017	641,000
Contestants: Andy – Saturday Night Live expert Paul – Southern cassowary expert Paran – Sigmund Freud expert **Margaret – The West Wing expert** Tom's round: Tom's subject – Potatoes
17	"Episode 7"	13 September 2017	667,000
Contestants: Ilona – Pterosaur expert Bill – Albert Einstein expert Daniel – Red Bull Air Race expert **Alyssa – Dynasty expert** Tom's round: Tom's subject – Hanna-Barbera
18	"Episode 8"	20 September 2017	630,000
Contestants: Jen – Amelia Earhart expert **Jim – The Rockford Files expert** Will – Thermodynamics expert Carolyn – Grace Kelly expert Tom's round: Tom's subject – Monkeys
19	"Episode 9"	27 September 2017	616,000
Contestants: Jay – Babe Ruth expert **Brett – Billy Joel expert** Rowan – Cold War expert Megan – The Mighty Boosh expert Tom's round: Tom's subject – Clouds
20	"Episode 10"	4 October 2017	697,000
Contestants: Angela – Pride and Prejudice expert **Pawel – Formula One expert** Greg – Grammar expert Caitlin – Judy Garland expert Tom's round: Tom's subject – Pacific Ocean
21	"Episode 11"	11 October 2017	653,000
Contestants: Cheryl – Australian Explorers expert Paul – Happy Days expert Arthur – Bangladesh Cricket Team expert **Jacob – Hunter S. Thompson expert** Tom's round: Tom's subject – Typography
22	"Episode 12"	18 October 2017	591,000
Contestants: Emilia – ABBA expert Rob – Apple Inc. expert Cam – Board Games expert **Rebecca – Shirley Temple expert** Tom's round: Tom's subject – Mathematics
23	"Episode 13"	25 October 2017	665,000
Contestants: Sarah – Buffy the Vampire Slayer expert Matt – The Smashing Pumpkins expert Andrew – Julio-Claudian dynasty expert **Peter – Oasis expert** Tom's round: Tom's subject – Margaret Court
24	"Episode 14"	1 November 2017	659,000
Contestants: Jared – NBA expert Ross – Quentin Tarantino expert **Peter – WWII Weapons expert** Jess – Sex and the City expert Tom's round: Tom's subject – The Sound of Music
25	"Episode 15"	8 November 2017	678,000
Contestants: **Markos – James Bond expert** Simon – Birds of Australia expert Phil – Greg Norman expert Robyn – Kiss expert Tom's round: Tom's subject – Indonesia
26	"Episode 16"	15 November 2017	598,000
Contestants: **Carolyn – Roger Federer expert** Geoff – Robin Hood expert Greg – Caravaggio expert Andrew – Madonna expert Tom's round: Tom's subject – Senses
27	"Episode 17"	22 November 2017	664,000
Contestants: Charles – Horses expert Daniel – French and Saunders expert Sarah – Terry Pratchett expert **Mark – John F. Kennedy expert** Tom's round: Tom's subject – Phobias
28	"Episode 18"	29 November 2017	639,000
Contestants: Neel – Avatar: The Last Airbender expert Bronwyn – Phil Spector expert **Paul – 1975 Australian Constitutional Crisis expert** Jamie – The Oscars expert Tom's round: Tom's subject – New York City

=== Series 3 (2018–19) ===
Names in Bold are the winners

No.	Title	Original release date	Australian viewers
29	"Episode 1"	21 February 2018	550,000
Contestants: Leon – Vintage Australian Washing Machines expert Mark – Premier League expert Tom – Winston Churchill expert **Evelyn – Audrey Hepburn expert** Tom's round: Tom's subject – French Colonies
30	"Episode 2"	28 February 2018	526,000
Contestants: Dave – Benedict Cumberbatch expert **Paul – Led Zeppelin expert** Kelly – United States geography expert Velvet – One Direction expert Tom's round: Tom's subject – Magicians
31	"Episode 3"	7 March 2018	534,000
Contestants: Colleen – Homer's The Odyssey expert Kevin – John Farnham expert Vivien – Australian Insects expert **Lisa – The French Resistance expert** Tom's round: Tom's subject – Beer
32	"Episode 4"	14 March 2018	630,000
Contestants: Georgina – Mary MacKillop expert John – The Rolling Stones expert Theja – Sachin Tendulkar expert **Julia – Miss Marple expert** Tom's round: Tom's subject – The Circus
33	"Episode 5"	21 March 2018	608,000
Contestants: Greg – Tour de France expert Leigh – Wicked expert **Sue – Edward III of England expert** Ben – "Weird Al" Yankovic expert Tom's round: Tom's subject – Chairs
34	"Episode 6"	28 March 2018	672,000
Contestants: Peter – Jimi Hendrix expert **Mark – Rolex expert** Anna – Futurama expert Colleen – Russian Revolution expert Tom's round: Tom's subject – Umpires Note: Contestant Mark is the partner of Renae, who appeared in episode 2 of Series 1.
35	"Episode 7"	11 April 2018	570,000
Contestants: Winnie – Origami expert Tim – Fawlty Towers expert **Dianne – Eleanor of Aquitaine expert** Andrew – Mountain pygmy possum expert Tom's round: Tom's subject – Confectionery
36	"Episode 8"	18 April 2018	557,000
Contestants: Evie – Star Trek expert **Tim – Black Sabbath expert** Chris – Nikola Tesla expert Alison – Piano expert Tom's round: Tom's subject – Quiz Shows
37	"Episode 9"	25 April 2018	567,000
Contestants: Michael – Abraham Lincoln expert **Rob – WWE expert** Gemma – The Goonies expert Matthew – Great white shark expert Tom's round: Tom's subject – Anzac Day
38	"Episode 10"	19 September 2018	672,000
Contestants: **Ross – Elon Musk expert** Kate – The Strokes expert Kogu – A-League expert David – The Human Eye expert Tom's round: Tom's subject – Conspiracies
39	"Episode 11"	26 September 2018	649,000
Contestants: James – Star Wars expert Anthony – Ned Kelly expert Nicole – Bon Jovi expert **Bec – Australian Macropods expert** Tom's round: Tom's subject – Toilets
40	"Episode 12"	3 October 2018	646,000
Contestants: Maree – Alfred Hitchcock expert Stuart – Ironman World Championship expert Maddy – Tripod expert **Andrew – Freemasonry expert** Tom's round: Tom's subject – Darts
41	"Episode 13"	10 October 2018	686,000
Contestants: **Zara – Justin Timberlake expert** Suzanne – Radiohead expert Alex – Barack Obama expert Paul – Classic Holden cars expert Tom's round: Tom's subject – Feminism
42	"Episode 14"	17 October 2018	704,000
Contestants: **Liv – Thunderbirds expert** Matt – Sydney Swans expert Brad – Rubik's Cube expert Mark – Nuclear physics expert Tom's round: Tom's subject – Play School Note: The final credits acknowledged that contestant Liv Watts died prior to the broadcast of the episode.
43	"Episode 15"	31 October 2018	679,000
Contestants: Jim – Skateboarding expert Amanda – Maria Montessori expert **Nicole – Duran Duran expert** Martin – Stanley Kubrick expert Tom's round: Tom's subject – Underwear
44	"Episode 16"	7 November 2018	776,000
Contestants: Phil – Pearl Harbor expert Valerie – Peep Show expert **Jason – Back to the Future expert** Mark – Muhammad Ali expert Tom's round: Tom's subject – CWA
45	"Episode 17"	14 November 2018	710,000
Contestants: Steve – Tropical cyclones expert Jacqui – Foo Fighters expert **Darren – Knots expert** Damien – Sherlock Holmes expert Tom's round: Tom's subject – Shane Warne
46	"Episode 18"	21 November 2018	741,000
Contestants: Chris – Scotch whisky expert Kathryn – Kath & Kim expert Brad – U.S. Masters expert **Rachael – The Hunger Games expert** Tom's round: Tom's subject – Dictators
47	"Episode 19"	28 November 2018	742,000
Contestants: **John – Pinball expert** Maddie – Round the Twist expert David – Bruce Lee expert Jessi – Alaska expert Tom's round: Tom's subject – Museums
48	"Episode 20"	5 December 2018	646,000
Contestants: Andrew – US serial killers expert Geoff – The Great Escape expert **Erin – David Bowie expert** Chris – RuPaul's Drag Race expert Tom's round: Tom's subject – Delta Goodrem Note: The final credits acknowledged that contestant Geoff Ogden-Browne died in July 2018, prior to the broadcast of the episode.
49	"Episode 21"	12 December 2018	623,000
Contestants: Alan – Meryl Streep expert Liz – AFLW expert **Michael – Khmer Empire expert** Kim – My Little Pony expert Tom's round: Tom's subject – Kidneys
50	"Episode 22"	30 January 2019	600,000
Contestants: Shah – Rugby World Cup expert Susan – Treehouse book series expert **Spencer – Vespa expert** David – Elvis Presley expert Tom's round: Tom's subject – Gold

=== Series 4 (2019) ===
Names in Bold are the winners

No.	Title	Original release date	Australia viewers
51	"Episode 1"	6 February 2019	572,000
Contestants: Erwin – Kylie Minogue expert **Gavin – Bathurst 1000 expert** Cale – The Office expert Christine – Cremation expert Tom's round: Tom's subject – Cairns
52	"Episode 2"	13 February 2019	607,000
Contestants: Charles – Meccano expert **Katie – Alcatraz expert** Darryl – R.E.M. expert Kate – Indonesian Political History expert Tom's round: Tom's subject – The First Fleet
53	"Episode 3"	20 February 2019	610,000
Contestants: William – Whales expert Grahame – World Geography expert **Janine – Life of Pi expert** Nick – Sir Donald Bradman expert Tom's round: Tom's subject – Australian TV Presenters
54	"Episode 4"	27 February 2019	662,000
Contestants: Russell – The Big Bang Theory expert Neil – The Adventures of Tintin expert **Maree – Queen expert** Jo – Jonestown massacre expert Tom's round: Tom's subject – Predators Note: The winner of this episode performed the final sign off in AUSLAN
55	"Episode 5"	6 March 2019	694,000
Contestants: Keiara – Gilmore Girls expert John – American Civil War expert Jancarol – Yes expert **Thom – Banksia expert** Tom's round: Tom's subject – Public holidays
56	"Episode 6"	13 March 2019	627,000
Contestants: Edem – Rollercoasters expert Paul – Manchester United expert **Eliza – The Shining expert** Carly – Watergate expert Tom's round: Tom's subject – Flowers
57	"Episode 7"	20 March 2019	697,000
Contestants: Charles – Horses expert **Lucy – Wars of the Roses expert** Theja – Sachin Tendulkar expert Leon – Vintage Australian Washing Machines expert Tom's round: Tom's subject – Duds Note: The episode featured contestants who had lost previous episodes of Hard Quiz, and was titled Battle of the Duds.
58	"Episode 8"	27 March 2019	657,000
Contestants: Chris – Zimbabwe national cricket team expert Marc – Pokémon expert Jess – Batavia expert **Kate – Absolutely Fabulous expert** Tom's round: Tom's subject – ASIO
59	"Episode 9"	3 April 2019	728,000
Contestants: **Paul – Wright Brothers expert** Jane – The Book of Mormon expert Jamie – Aerosmith expert John – Volkswagen Beetle expert Tom's round: Tom's subject – Assassinations
60	"Episode 10"	10 April 2019	728,000
Contestants: Drew – Bill Clinton expert Pat – Neptune expert Belinda – Press Gang expert **Caitlin – Taylor Swift expert** Tom's round: Tom's subject – Barbie
61	"Episode 11"	31 July 2019	667,000
Contestants: David – Joan Crawford expert Hollee – BTS expert Joe – John Eales expert **Seraphya – Jewish holidays expert** Tom's round: Tom's subject – Deep sea creatures
62	"Episode 12"	7 August 2019	590,000
Contestants: Luke – Steve Waugh expert **Nic – Luna Park Sydney expert** Hayley – David Foster Wallace expert James – Frank Sinatra expert Tom's round: Tom's subject – Gods
63	"Episode 13"	14 August 2019	619,000
Contestants: Wynonah – Dolly Parton expert **Ali – Toy Story expert** Kaushik – Pete Sampras expert Ann – Dogs expert Tom's round: Tom's subject – Marriage
64	"Episode 14"	21 August 2019	641,000
Contestants: Gary – The Rocky Horror Picture Show expert **Neeharika – Brooklyn Nine-Nine expert** Steve – Air traffic control expert Joseph – Napoleonic Wars expert Tom's round: Tom's subject – Australian Open
65	"Episode 15"	28 August 2019	616,000
Contestants: Sonia – French cheeses expert Sam – World chess champions expert James – The White Stripes expert **Mike – Leaders of the Soviet Union expert** Tom's round: Tom's subject – Vaccines
66	"Episode 16"	4 September 2019	517,000
Contestants: **Jeremy – Nick Riewoldt expert** Alix – Croquet expert Julie – Barry Manilow expert Steve – Toenails expert Tom's round: Tom's subject – Easter
67	"Episode 17"	11 September 2019	605,000
Contestants: Jim – Skateboarding expert Conan – George Orwell expert **Winnie – Origami expert** Walter – Friends expert Tom's round: Tom's subject – Losers Note: The episode featured contestants who had lost previous episodes of Hard Quiz, and was titled Battle of the Duds.
68	"Episode 18"	18 September 2019	570,000
Contestants: Natali – Strictly Ballroom expert Wayne – Australian Light Horse expert **Amy – Bee Gees expert** Harley – Breaking Bad expert Tom's round: Tom's subject – Doris Day
69	"Episode 19"	25 September 2019	630,000
Contestants: **Lyn – David Cassidy expert** Harrison – Coffee expert Neal – Anne Frank expert Dan – 1868 Aboriginal Cricket Tour expert Tom's round: Tom's subject – Handkerchiefs Note: In this episode, the winner Lyn was the first ever to get all five of her questions correct in the final round.
70	"Episode 20"	2 October 2019	670,000
Contestants: Fraser – World War II Tanks expert Tracey – Manhattan expert **Mel – Bananarama expert** Chris – He-Man and the Masters of the Universe expert Tom's round: Tom's subject – Hats

=== Series 5 (2020–21) ===
Names in Bold are the winners

No.	Title	Original release date	Australia viewers
72	"Episode 1"	5 February 2020	550,000
Contestants: Vinny – Lady Gaga expert Jess – W. B. Yeats expert **Brigid – Xanadu expert** Michael – Typewriters expert Tom's round: Tom's subject – Peanuts
73	"Episode 2"	12 February 2020	597,000
Contestants: Kreisha – The Young Ones expert Abhi – Victor Chang expert **Simon – Makybe Diva expert** Frank – Volvo expert Tom's round: Tom's subject – Insurance
74	"Episode 3"	19 February 2020	588,000
Contestants: Tony – Louis Armstrong expert Nick – Boston Red Sox expert Sarah – Arnold Schwarzenegger expert **Chris – McDonald's expert** Tom's round: Tom's subject – United Nations
75	"Episode 4"	26 February 2020	610,000
Contestants: Rhys – The Lord of the Rings expert Matt – Ayrton Senna expert Michelle – Barbarella expert **Peter – Eric Abetz expert** Tom's round: Tom's subject – Andy Lee
76	"Episode 5"	4 March 2020	598,000
Contestants: **Lauren – Little House on the Prairie expert** Edward – Amedeo Modigliani expert Glenys – Thylacine expert Gaya – Rihanna expert Tom's round: Tom's subject – Washington, D.C.
77	"Episode 6"	11 March 2020	573,000
Contestants: **Daniel – U2 expert** Bethany – Hercule Poirot expert Nellie – Home Alone expert Mim – Squids expert Tom's round: Tom's subject – Ita Buttrose
78	"Episode 7"	18 March 2020	753,000
Contestants: **Kate – Fremantle Dockers expert** Matt – Elizabeth I expert Shrikan – Will & Grace expert Christian – The Tube expert Tom's round: Tom's subject – Crying
79	"Episode 8"	25 March 2020	809,000
Contestants: Maria – Brooklyn Bridge expert **Brittany – Kurt Cobain expert** Oliver – Badminton expert James – 90s Disney Cartoons expert Tom's round: Tom's subject – Escapes
80	"Episode 9"	1 April 2020	821,000
Contestants: Dennis – The Bold and the Beautiful expert **Pat – Australia's 45th Parliament expert** James – Helicopters expert Rob – Siamese fighting fish expert Tom's round: Tom's subject – Boudicca
81	"Episode 10"	8 April 2020	778,000
Contestants: Laura – Game of Thrones expert **Will – Franklin D. Roosevelt expert** Jocelyn – Grand Slam Tennis expert Warwick – Electronic organs expert Tom's round: Tom's subject – Prince Philip, Duke of Edinburgh
82	"Episode 11"	15 April 2020	733,000
Contestants: Kathy – Disneyland expert **Jack – The Hitchhiker's Guide to the Galaxy expert** Hanan – M*A*S*H expert Adam – Fender Guitars expert Tom's round: Tom's subject – Angela Merkel
83	"Episode 12"	22 April 2020	723,000
Contestants: **Roj – The Blues Brothers expert** Kate – Jack Russell Terrier expert Tina – Roald Dahl expert Miles – Mazda MX-5 expert Tom's round: Tom's subject – Gardening Australia
84	"Episode 13"	29 April 2020	711,000
Contestants: Kaushik – Pete Sampras expert **Josh – Australian Reality television expert** Matt – Sydney Swans expert Julie – Barry Manilow expert Tom's round: Tom's subject – Rejects Note: The episode featured contestants who had lost previous episodes of Hard Quiz, and was titled Battle of the Duds.
85	"Episode 14"	6 May 2020	708,000
Contestants: Carmen – Gossip Girl expert Nelson – Tiger Woods expert Chris – Jack the Ripper expert **Branwell – Julia Gillard expert** Tom's round: Tom's subject – Angels
86	"Episode 15"	13 May 2020	760,000
Contestants: Ash – Clarinet expert Darren – Australian pythons expert **Sebastian – Transformers expert** Penny – Islamic political movements expert Tom's round: Tom's subject – Fake Bands
87	"Episode 16"	15 July 2020	707,000
Contestants: **Alyce – Rafael Nadal expert** Mitchell – SpongeBob SquarePants expert Oslo – New Yorker Cartoons expert Julie – Dingoes expert Tom's round: Tom's subject – A Star Is Born
88	"Episode 17"	22 July 2020	724,000
Contestants: Ryan – Guinea Pigs expert Patrick – Vintage sneakers expert **Steven – Peanuts comics expert** Katharina – Penicillin expert Tom's round: Tom's subject – Avocados
89	"Episode 18"	29 July 2020	705,000
Contestants: Ken – Australian Geography expert Trent – Shakespeare's Richard III expert **Chris – Canberra Raiders expert** Sue – Dewey Decimal System expert Tom's round: Tom's subject – Dance Crazes
90	"Episode 19"	5 August 2020	746,000
Contestants: Marie – Barbra Streisand expert Gus – Wolverine expert Seamus – Halo expert **Jess – The Handmaid's Tale expert** Tom's round: Tom's subject – Balls
91	"Episode 20"	12 August 2020	733,000
Contestants: Kristy – Arab-Israeli Conflict expert Michelle – Savage Garden expert **Dave – Saturn expert** Leo – Chicago Bulls expert Tom's round: Tom's subject – Fleas
92	"Episode 21"	19 August 2020	737,000
Contestants: Rochelle – The Korean War expert Rebecca – Red Hot Chili Peppers expert Martin – Ducati Motorcycles expert **Crissy – The Great Plague expert** Tom's round: Tom's subject – Carbon dioxide
93	"Episode 22"	26 August 2020	698,000
Contestants: Jim – Calculus expert **Sean – Kākāpō expert** Helen – Theseus expert Steph – Neighbours expert Tom's round: Tom's subject – Crime
94	"Episode 23"	2 September 2020	672,000
Contestants: Patrick – Survivor expert Anna – James Herriot expert **David – Shane Warne expert** Peter – WWII Dam Busters Raid expert Tom's round: Tom's subject – Jingles
95	"Episode 24"	9 September 2020	682,000
Contestants: **Cynthia – Sylvester Stallone expert** Heather – Labyrinths expert Aaron – Leeds United F.C. expert Daley – Rats expert Tom's round: Tom's subject – Rebrands
96	"Episode 25"	16 September 2020	696,000
Contestants: Chris – Allan Border expert Ian – Bridge expert **Mary – Bluey expert** Iovita – Cleopatra expert Tom's round: Tom's subject – Holes
97	"Episode 26"	23 September 2020	729,000
Contestants: Claus – Charles Darwin expert **Kim – My Little Pony expert** Kevin – John Farnham expert David – The Human Eye expert Tom's round: Tom's subject – Flops Note: This episode featured contestants who had lost previous episodes of Hard Quiz, and was titled Battle of the Duds.
98	"Episode 27"	30 September 2020	705,000
Contestants: Suzanne – Pomeranians expert Stewart – Alien expert Aidan – UFC expert **Mark – Recorder expert** Tom's round: Tom's subject – TAFE
99	"Episode 28"	7 October 2020	643,000
Contestants: **Angus – Verdi Operas expert** Rosanne – Prince Charles expert Adam – Dungeons & Dragons expert Jane – Kill Bill expert Tom's round: Tom's subject – Euclidean Geometry
100	"Episode 29"	14 October 2020	756,000
Contestants: **Stephen – Prince expert** Craig – Holden Torana expert Tara – David Unaipon expert Jean – Studio Ghibli Films expert Tom's round: Tom's subject – Rhyming Slang
101	"Episode 30"	21 October 2020	671,000
Contestants: Naill – Australian hip hop expert Evie – Oliver Sacks expert **Jen – The Office expert** Owen – Julius Caesar expert Tom's round: Tom's subject – Revenge
102	"Episode 31"	28 October 2020	688,000
Contestants: Richard – Aircraft of the Royal Australian Air Force expert Jarrod – Seattle Seahawks expert **Jane – Forrest Gump expert** Shona – Leonardo da Vinci expert Tom's round: Tom's subject – Drag Queens
103	"Episode 32"	4 November 2020	596,000
Contestants: Bob – Siege of Tobruk expert **Steve – Shaun the Sheep expert** Frank – The Theory of Evolution expert Connor – Ferguson TE20 expert Tom's round: Tom's subject – Rove
104	"Episode 33"	11 November 2020	610,000
Contestants: **Jacqui – Tudor Monarchs expert** Therese – Adrian Mole expert Charlie – Vincent motorcycles expert Eoin – Superman expert Tom's round: Tom's subject – Television Finales
105	"Episode 34"	18 November 2020	586,000
Contestants: Rob – Fred Astaire expert Alicia – Black Books expert **Edwin – Australian native epiphytic orchids expert** Adam – Bret "The Hitman" Hart expert Tom's round: Tom's subject – Girl Guides
106	"Episode 35"	25 November 2020	670,000
Contestants: **Richard – Andy Warhol expert** Helen – Dressmaking expert Lisa – Kate Ceberano expert Roy – Donkey Kong expert Tom's round: Tom's subject – Poo
107	"Episode 36"	2 December 2020	639,000
Contestants: Paul – Manchester United expert Ed – South Park expert Wynonah – Dolly Parton expert **Fraser – World War II Tanks expert** Tom's round: Tom's subject – Failures Note: This episode featured contestants who had lost previous episodes of Hard Quiz, and was titled Battle of the Duds.
108	"Episode 37"	9 December 2020	618,000
Contestants: Carolyn – James Dean expert **Stevo – Pluto expert** Richard – Boomboxes expert Annie – Parks and Recreation expert Tom's round: Tom's subject – Ghosts
109	"Episode 38"	16 December 2020	623,000
Contestants: Katie – Alexander the Great expert **Jackson – The Golden Girls expert** Andy – Vietnam War expert Harry – Teeth expert Tom's round: Tom's subject – Clocks
111	"Episode 39"	3 February 2021	622,000
Contestants: Janet – Dugongs expert Sarah – Bob's Burgers expert Ross – Space Shuttle Disasters expert **Patrick – Pipe Organs expert** Tom's round: Tom's subject – Witches
112	"Episode 40"	10 February 2021	598,000
Contestants: Katherine – Australian Constitution expert Steve – Australian Venomous Snakes expert **Odette – The Mitford Sisters expert** Tommy – Marvel Cinematic Universe expert Tom's round: Tom's subject – General Knowledge

=== Series 6 (2021) ===
Names in Bold are the winners

No.	Title	Original release date	Australia viewers
113	"Episode 1"	17 February 2021	684,000
Contestants: Tamara – Greek Mythology expert **Michael – SpaceX expert** Megan – Rake expert Jason – Holden Commodore expert Tom's round: Tom's subject – Cracks
114	"Episode 2"	24 February 2021	584,000
Contestants: Aaron – Tuba expert Annette – Gone with the Wind expert Patrick – Paul McCartney expert **Louis – Battle of Britain expert** Tom's round: Tom's subject – Buckets
115	"Episode 3"	3 March 2021	579,000
Contestants: **Steph – Degrassi expert** Jackson – The British Open expert Jonathan – Bob Dylan expert Judith – Alfred the Great expert Tom's round: Tom's subject – Calisthenics
116	"Episode 4"	10 March 2021	629,000
Contestants: Ray – Wally Lewis expert Deb – Mel Brooks expert Sasha – Mushrooms expert **Shaun – Stephen Sondheim expert** Tom's round: Tom's subject – Ice
117	"Episode 5"	17 March 2021	621,000
Contestants: Rob – Kanye West expert **Jacob – Robert F. Kennedy expert** Liz – Jane Austen expert Trish – Gavin & Stacey expert Tom's round: Tom's subject – Protests
118	"Episode 6"	24 March 2021	640,000
Contestants: **Cynthia – Olivia Newton-John expert** Dave – Collingwood Magpies expert Steph – Garlic expert Jeremy – Top Gun expert Tom's round: Tom's subject – Paperclips
119	"Episode 7"	31 March 2021	740,000
Contestants: **Andrew – Milk expert** Jack – Field Hockey expert Catherine – Elizabeth Kenny expert Nick – Willy Wonka & the Chocolate Factory expert Tom's round: Tom's subject – Nuclear Bombs Note: This episode featured no correct answers during the Head-to-Head for the first time, with the winner being decided in Tom's Tie Breaker.
120	"Episode 8"	7 April 2021	653,000
Contestants: Bill – HMAS Melbourne expert Hannah – Justin Bieber expert Ben – Socceroos expert **Rob – Jim Henson expert** Tom's round: Tom's subject – Skincare
121	"Episode 9"	14 April 2021	683,000
Contestants: Prue – Schitt's Creek expert Isaac – Japanese Railways expert **Alice – Percy Jackson expert** Roger – Hank Williams expert Tom's round: Tom's subject – UFOs
122	"Episode 10"	21 April 2021	653,000
Contestants: **Heath – Ghostbusters expert** Jodi – Pink Floyd expert Simon – Classic Minis expert Josh – The Kim Dynasty expert Tom's round: Tom's subject – Hotels
123	"Episode 11"	28 April 2021	623,000
Contestants: **Kristy – Arab-Israeli Conflict expert** Julie – Dingoes expert Charlie – Vincent motorcycles expert Vinny – Lady Gaga expert Tom's round: Tom's subject – Toms Note: This episode featured contestants who had lost previous episodes of Hard Quiz, and was titled Battle of the Duds.
124	"Episode 12"	5 May 2021	663,000
Contestants: Antonia – European Union expert Stephen – Black holes expert **Linda – Mary Poppins expert** Anton – Novak Djokovic expert Tom's round: Tom's subject – Pete Evans
125	"Episode 13"	12 May 2021	636,000
Contestants: Phil – My Fair Lady expert **Michael – Qantas Flight 32 expert** Rachael – TikTok expert Mohan – Ricky Ponting expert Tom's round: Tom's subject – Meghan Markle
126	"Episode 14"	19 May 2021	620,000
Contestants: Andrew – Spartacus expert **Tom – Glee expert** Ben – Penguins expert Vanessa – The Trump Presidency expert Tom's round: Tom's subject – Breastfeeding
127	"Episode 15"	26 May 2021	672,000
Contestants: **Colin – Lockheed C-130 Hercules expert** Campbell – Little Shop of Horrors expert Kate – Simone Biles expert Brad – World of Warcraft expert Tom's round: Tom's subject – Vanilla
128	"Episode 16"	2 June 2021	661,000
Contestants: Zac – Star Wars Action Figures expert Bruce – Hanging Rock expert **Jessie – Tomorrow, When The War Began expert** Megan – Goo Goo Dolls expert Tom's round: Tom's subject – Dating
129	"Episode 17"	16 June 2021	662,000
Contestants: Sotiria – The First Persian Empire expert **Jake – The Wiggles expert** Sanjay – Scrubs expert Keith – Guinness expert Tom's round: Tom's subject – Celebrity Dogs
130	"Episode 18"	18 August 2021	679,000
Contestants: George – Kosciuszko National Park expert Felicity – Violin expert Chris – Nelson Mandela expert **Jenna – Sailor Moon expert** Tom's round: Tom's subject – Secrets
131	"Episode 19"	25 August 2021	568,000
Contestants: Tim – Mad Max expert **Christine – House of Windsor expert** Lisa – Björk expert Jack – Social Psychology expert Tom's round: Tom's subject – Flamingos
132	"Episode 20"	1 September 2021	592,000
Contestants: Sophie – Dracula expert Erin – Hillary Clinton expert Sach – Virat Kohli expert **Paul – Gibson Guitars expert** Tom's round: Tom's subject – Camouflage
133	"Episode 21"	8 September 2021	591,000
Contestants: **Cassie – Frozen expert** Peter – Tenzing Norgay expert Bec – Diamonds expert Hugh – Turnbull government expert Tom's round: Tom's subject – Feet
134	"Episode 22"	15 September 2021	601,000
Contestants: **Daniel – French and Saunders expert** Nelson – Tiger Woods expert Jim – Calculus expert Maria – Brooklyn Bridge expert Tom's round: Tom's subject – Recycling Note 1: This episode featured contestants who had lost previous episodes of Hard Quiz, and was titled Battle of the Duds. Note 2: The final credits acknowledged that contestant Maria died prior to the broadcast of the episode.
135	"Episode 23"	22 September 2021	630,000
Contestants: Michelle – Petula Clark expert Ryan – McDonnell Douglas F/A-18 Hornet expert **Rosalie – How to Train Your Dragon expert** Troy – Periodic table expert Tom's round: Tom's subject – Housewives
136	"Episode 24"	29 September 2021	577,000
Contestants: Miriam – Women's Suffrage "Monster Petition" expert Alex – William the Conqueror expert **Anthony – The Castle expert** Sheridan – Silverchair expert Tom's round: Tom's subject – Bec and Lleyton
137	"Episode 25"	6 October 2021	623,000
Contestants: Chris – Grug expert Shelby – Meghan Markle expert Tim – Money laundering expert **Debs – Les Misérables expert** Tom's round: Tom's subject – Whistles
138	"Episode 26"	13 October 2021	552,000
Contestants: **Luke – Ace Ventura expert** Sarah – Kray twins expert Deborah – Airbus A320 expert Dean – Mortal Kombat expert Tom's round: Tom's subject – Tattoos
139	"Episode 27"	20 October 2021	595,000
Contestants: Jean – King Henry VII expert Marcus – Dinosaurs expert **Kim – The Adventures of Priscilla, Queen of the Desert expert** Charlie – Shaquille O'Neal expert Tom's round: Tom's subject – Social Media
140	"Episode 28"	27 October 2021	549,000
Contestants: Jonny – Manchester City expert **Lisa – Australian Blue Tongued Lizards expert** Nick – Mariah Carey expert Kim – The Baby-Sitters Club expert Tom's round: Tom's subject – Morning Television
141	"Episode 29"	3 November 2021	646,000
Contestants: Steve – Bob Geldof expert Kshira – Machine learning expert Mike – Powerful owl expert **Jen – The Matrix Trilogy expert** Tom's round: Tom's subject – Bubbles
142	"Episode 30"	10 November 2021	647,000
Contestants: **Jason – Chernobyl disaster expert** Rueben – Ultimate Frisbee expert Naomi – Wallace and Gromit expert Kim – Hanson expert Tom's round: Tom's subject – Wet Things
143	"Episode 31"	17 November 2021	617,000
Contestants: **Mel – Duke Kahanamoku expert** Riley – AC/DC expert Berlinda – Australian Dung Beetle Project expert Bree – Mean Girls expert Tom's round: Tom's subject – The French
144	"Episode 32"	24 November 2021	522,000
Contestants: **Cris – Australian railways expert** Nicola – The Twilight Saga expert Matthew – Midnight Oil expert Michelle – Danish Kings of England expert Tom's round: Tom's subject – Graffiti
145	"Episode 33"	1 December 2021	574,000
Contestants: Miles – Mazda MX-5 expert Nick – Sir Donald Bradman expert **Lisa – Kate Ceberano expert** Ash – Clarinet expert Tom's round: Tom's subject – Defeat Note: This episode featured contestants who had lost previous episodes of Hard Quiz, and was titled Battle of the Duds.
146	"Episode 34"	8 December 2021	501,000
Contestants: Damien – Neil Armstrong expert Kevin – Vintage Synthesizers expert **Pip – Dance Academy expert** Penny – Sierra Leone expert Tom's round: Tom's subject – Brussels sprouts
147	"Episode 35"	15 December 2021	537,000
Contestants: Jason – '80s and '90s supermodels expert **Peta – Stephen King's It expert** Debbie – Billy Idol expert Amrith – The Witcher expert Tom's round: Tom's subject – Natalie Imbruglia

=== Series 7 (2022) ===
Names in Bold are the winners

No.	Title	Original release date	Australia viewers
149	"Episode 1"	2 February 2022	562,000
Contestants: **Tim – Los Angeles Dodgers expert** Craig – Lawrence of Arabia expert Anthony – Project Mercury expert Leanne – Get Smart expert Tom's round: Tom's subject – Cakes
150	"Episode 2"	9 February 2022	534,000
Contestants: **Elise – Phil Collins expert** Hew – Telecom Phonecards expert Elli – High School Musical expert Matt – Frank Lloyd Wright expert Tom's round: Tom's subject – Mums
151	"Episode 3"	16 February 2022	550,000
Contestants: **Josh – Fast & Furious expert** Jules – Bananas expert Nicola – Leon Trotsky expert Jarrod – Sun expert Tom's round: Tom's subject – Halloween
152	"Episode 4"	23 February 2022	589,000
Contestants: **Allan – Deep Purple expert** Matt – Isle of Wight expert Clem – E.T. the Extra-Terrestrial expert Erin – Suncorp Super Netball expert Tom's round: Tom's subject – Goats
153	"Episode 5"	2 March 2022	637,000
Contestants: Michael – Bugs Bunny expert Donna – To Kill a Mockingbird expert Bill – Magic: The Gathering expert **Sarah – St Kilda Saints expert** Tom's round: Tom's subject – Chalk
154	"Episode 6"	9 March 2022	571,000
Contestants: **Erica – Kurt Vonnegut expert** Reilly – Britney Spears expert Stacey Jane – Wayne's World expert Gavin – Condoms expert Tom's round: Tom's subject – Chickens
155	"Episode 7"	16 March 2022	453,000
Contestants: **Nick – Willy Wonka and the Chocolate Factory expert** Brad – World of Warcraft expert Sach – Virat Kohli expert Megan – Goo Goo Dolls expert Tom's round: Tom's subject – Frauds Note: This episode featured contestants who had lost previous episodes of Hard Quiz, and was titled Battle of the Duds.
156	"Episode 8"	23 March 2022	477,000
Contestants: **Jade – Toby Price expert** Brian – Australian Greens expert Aaron – Malaria expert Billie – Lano and Woodley expert Tom's round: Tom's subject – Curses
157	"Episode 9"	30 March 2022	422,000
Contestants: **Sarah – Harry Potter Movies expert** Elliot – George W. Bush expert Darren – Bricks expert Rinaldo – Diego Maradona expert Tom's round: Tom's subject – The Wild West
158	"Episode 10"	6 April 2022	569,000
Contestants: Kellie – Stargate SG-1 expert Amol – Mahatma Gandhi expert Jennifer – Australian Poetry expert **Jools – Scott Pilgrim expert** Tom's round: Tom's subject – Ducks
159	"Episode 11"	13 April 2022	563,000
Contestants: Mike – Richard Wagner expert **Jordan – Nicole Kidman expert** Suelynn – Buddhism expert Lesley – Fight Club expert Tom's round: Tom's subject – Ninjas
160	"Episode 12"	20 April 2022	497,000
Contestants: Chloe – Adolf Hitler expert Aiden – Fortnite expert Susie – Jesus Christ Superstar expert **Scott – Agatha Christie expert** Tom's round: Tom's subject – Rainbows
161	"Episode 13"	27 April 2022	533,000
Contestants: Sharmeen – Tutankhamun expert **Simon – Feet expert** Kooka – Mister Ed expert Chloe – Jake Gyllenhaal expert Tom's round: Tom's subject – Mirrors
162	"Episode 14"	4 May 2022	505,000
Contestants: **Bec – Diamonds expert** Jack – Social Psychology expert Anton – Novak Djokovic expert Berlinda – Australian Dung Beetle Project expert Tom's round: Tom's subject – Logie Awards Note: This episode featured contestants who had lost previous episodes of Hard Quiz, and was titled Battle of the Duds.
163	"Episode 15"	25 May 2022	544,000
Contestants: **Garrie – Robert Mapplethorpe expert** Mark – Melbourne Storm expert Maggie – Metallica expert Siobhan – Bridgerton expert Tom's round: Tom's subject – Mysteries
164	"Episode 16"	1 June 2022	547,000
Contestants: Elisabeth – Puberty Blues expert **Jim – Green Day expert** Josh – Bible expert Anna – Weimaraners expert Tom's round: Tom's subject – Korea
165	"Episode 17"	28 September 2022	543,000
Contestants: **Tony – Final Fantasy expert** Linda – Jacqueline Kennedy Onassis expert Callum – Arnott's Biscuits expert Rachel – Father Ted expert Tom's round: Tom's subject – Torture
166	"Episode 18"	5 October 2022	549,000
Contestants: Scott – Los Angeles Lakers expert **Bayley – Beauty and the Beast expert** Peter – Easy Rider expert Brooke – Keeping Up with the Kardashians expert Tom's round: Tom's subject – Dolly Magazine
167	"Episode 19"	12 October 2022	471,000
Contestants: Daniel – Ratatouille expert Tim – Australian Owls expert Wayne – Ford Mustang expert **Kylie – The Real Housewives of New York City expert** Tom's round: Tom's subject – Buttons
168	"Episode 20"	19 October 2022	528,000
Contestants: **Suzanne – Rush expert** Jagger – Family Guy expert Courtney – Macbeth expert Takura – Armageddon expert Tom's round: Tom's subject – Left-Handers
169	"Episode 21"	26 October 2022	515,000
Contestants: **Marisa – Jackass expert** Allan – Miles Davis expert Zac – 2008 financial crisis expert Tom – Hamish & Andy expert Tom's round: Tom's subject – The Beach
170	"Episode 22"	2 November 2022	520,000
Contestants: Harry – Teeth expert Rachael – TikTok expert Kogu – A-League expert **Bree – Mean Girls expert** Tom's round: Tom's subject – Leftovers Note: This episode featured contestants who had lost previous episodes of Hard Quiz, and was titled Battle of the Duds.
171	"Episode 23"	9 November 2022	541,000
Contestants: Maria – The Phantom expert Spencer – Love Actually expert **Span – Republican China expert** Theo – Eddie McGuire expert Tom's round: Tom's subject – Time
172	"Episode 24"	16 November 2022	478,000
Contestants: Phil – Bruce Springsteen expert Mark – Flags expert Miek – Hamilton expert **Matt – Hokusai expert** Tom's round: Tom's subject – Competitive eating

=== Series 8 (2023) ===
Names in Bold are the winners

No.	Title	Original release date	Australia viewers
174	"Episode 1"	8 February 2023	492,000
Contestants: Mikey – Antique Purses expert Izzy – Smallpox expert **Ed – The Legend of Zelda expert** Jasmine – The Lion King expert Tom's round: Tom's subject – Neuroscience
175	"Episode 2"	15 February 2023	476,000
Contestants: **Glen – Tina Arena expert** Fiona – Tasmanian Devil expert James – Breaker Morant expert Rach – Typefaces expert Tom's round: Tom's subject – Pies
176	"Episode 3"	22 February 2023	468,000
Contestants: Tuki – Seinfeld expert Judy – Galápagos tortoise expert Austin – Samantha Stosur expert **Ash – Freddie Mercury expert** Tom's round: Tom's subject – Perth
177	"Episode 4"	1 March 2023	480,000
Contestants: Joel – Australian Currency expert Ange – Pugs expert Megan – Monsters, Inc. expert **Anna – Frida Kahlo expert** Tom's round: Tom's subject – Shampoo
178	"Episode 5"	8 March 2023	515,000
Contestants: Meg – Echidnas expert Paige – Grey's Anatomy expert **Luca – Anthony Albanese expert** Kevin – Rin Tin Tin expert Tom's round: Tom's subject – Shoes
179	"Episode 6"	15 March 2023	513,000
Contestants: Michael – Bugs Bunny expert **Spencer – Love Actually expert** Miek – Hamilton expert Deborah – Airbus A320 expert Tom's round: Tom's subject – Hoaxes Note: This episode featured contestants who had lost previous episodes of Hard Quiz, and was titled Battle of the Duds.
180	"Episode 7"	22 March 2023	499,000
Contestants: Harley – Tony Hawk expert Terry – Parachuting expert **Pip – Glenn McGrath expert** Shayla – Mad Men expert Tom's round: Tom's subject – Acid
181	"Episode 8"	29 March 2023	542,000
Contestants: Sam – Colonoscopy expert Robin – Joseph Stalin expert Anna – Nicki Minaj expert **Eleanor – Platypus expert** Tom's round: Tom's subject – Castles
182	"Episode 9"	5 April 2023	554,000
Contestants: **Tab – Pineapples expert** Greg – Daniel Ricciardo expert James – Geoffrey Chaucer expert Drew – Blade Runner expert Tom's round: Tom's subject – Soap
183	"Episode 10"	12 April 2023	472,000
Contestants: Esther – Scouts Australia expert Laura – The Incredibles expert Nick – Penny-farthings expert **Adam – Michael Jordan expert** Tom's round: Tom's subject – Spaghetti
184	"Episode 11"	19 April 2023	416,000
Contestants: Justin – Australian finches expert Ash – Beyoncé expert Mary-Lou – SeaChange expert **Cass – Rent expert** Tom's round: Tom's subject – Advertising
185	"Episode 12"	26 April 2023	484,000
Contestants: Justin – Cuban Missile Crisis expert Jane – George Michael expert **Cyrus – Western Bulldogs expert** Naomi – The Sims expert Tom's round: Tom's subject – Onions
186	"Episode 13"	3 May 2023	482,000
Contestants: Jenn – Encanto expert Sam – Brett Whiteley expert **Izzy – George Harrison expert** Benny – Man vs. Wild expert Tom's round: Tom's subject – Podcasts
187	"Episode 14"	10 May 2023	461,000
Contestants: Chad – Australian zoos expert Tammy – BoJack Horseman expert **Jane – Salt-N-Pepa expert** David – Anna Pavlova expert Tom's round: Tom's subject – Babies
188	"Episode 15"	17 May 2023	430,000
Contestants: Chantel – Hello Kitty expert Henry – Gilbert and Sullivan expert Mark – Triumph Motorcycles expert **Shannon – Michael J. Fox expert** Tom's round: Tom's subject – Big Things
189	"Episode 16"	24 May 2023	472,000
Contestants: Marcus – Dinosaurs expert Katharina – Penicillin expert Matt – Isle of Wight expert **Kate – Simone Biles expert** Tom's round: Tom's subject – Mistakes Note: This episode featured contestants who had lost previous episodes of Hard Quiz, and was titled Battle of the Duds.
190	"Episode 17"	31 May 2023	408,000
Contestants: Lee – Machin postage stamps expert Ellie – Animal Crossing expert **Richard – Morse code expert** Lani – Good Will Hunting expert Tom's round: Tom's subject – Ashes Note: All four contestants featured in this episode were ex-pat Brits, and was titled The Ashes: Tom vs The Poms.
191	"Episode 18"	2 August 2023	461,000
Contestants: Connor – Bones expert Alex – Cricket bats expert **Paul – Australian parrots expert** Flick – WikiLeaks expert Tom's round: Tom's subject – Dave Hughes
192	"Episode 19"	9 August 2023	478,000
Contestants: **Steve – Sydney Opera House expert** Jacquie – AFL umpire expert Ben – Android expert Lisa – Gladiators expert Tom's round: Tom's subject – Trade Unions
193	"Episode 20"	16 August 2023	193,000
Contestants: Jo – Australian Microbats expert Darcy – Minecraft expert Peter – Mars expert **Sarah – Billy Madison expert** Tom's round: Tom's subject – Boy Bands
194	"Episode 21"	23 August 2023	497,000
Contestants: PJ – The IT Crowd expert Michael – Celine Dion expert Grahman – Avro Lancaster expert **Prashant – African Venomous Snakes expert** Tom's round: Tom's subject – Censorship
195	"Episode 22"	30 August 2023	450,000
Contestants: Danielle – Harry Styles expert David – Wheat expert **Lochie – Pulp Fiction expert** Jax – Evonne Goolagong Cawley expert Tom's round: Tom's subject – Scandals
196	"Episode 23"	6 September 2023	434,000
Contestants: Paul – Harp expert Neil – Beekeeping expert John – Nauru expert **Hester – The Late Show expert** Tom's round: Tom's subject – Mascots
197	"Episode 24"	13 September 2023	402,000
Contestants: Nina – Modern Family expert Rory – Brisbane Broncos expert Patricia – Schindler's List expert **Steve – S Club 7 expert** Tom's round: Tom's subject – Lawyers
198	"Episode 25"	20 September 2023	400,000
Contestants: Kate – Katy Perry expert **Pete – René Descartes expert** Sarah – Human Immune System expert Matt – Come from Away expert Tom's round: Tom's subject – Queensland
199	"Episode 26"	27 September 2023	477,000
Contestants: Steph – Backstreet Boys expert Jordan – Pirates of the Caribbean expert Brett – Australian wine expert **Jess – Sir David Attenborough expert** Tom's round: Tom's subject – Cutlery
200	"Episode 27"	4 October 2023	470,000
Contestants: Maria – The Phantom expert Peter – Easy Rider expert Allan – Miles Davis expert **Chloe – Adolf Hitler expert** Tom's round: Tom's subject – Hard Quiz Note: This episode featured contestants who had lost previous episodes of Hard Quiz, and was titled Battle of the Duds.
201	"Episode 28"	11 October 2023	464,000
Contestants: Sammy – Bratz expert Helen – Kate Bush expert **Vic – The Goodies expert** Vicki – Kakadu National Park expert Tom's round: Tom's subject – Idols
202	"Episode 29"	18 October 2023	421,000
Contestants: **Natalie – Scooby-Doo expert** Seath – The Salvation Army expert Bel – Slipknot expert Dan – The Big Lebowski expert Tom's round: Tom's subject – Regional Festivals
203	"Episode 30"	25 October 2023	421,000
Contestants: **Andrew – Elvis Presley expert** Anthony – Charlotte Hornets expert Ash – Jurassic Park expert Eliza – Gough Whitlam expert Tom's round: Tom's subject – Nothing

=== Series 9 (2024) ===
Names in Bold are the winners

No.	Title	Original release date	Australia viewers (National) (Note: On 28 January 2024, OzTAM's ratings data recording system changed. Viewership data now focuses on National Total ratings instead of providing data on the 5 metro centres and overnight shares.)
205	"Episode 1"	7 February 2024	724,000
Contestants: Ange – Marilyn Monroe expert **Jack – Godzilla expert** Jon – Whale shark expert Andrea – Swan Lake expert Tom's round: Tom's subject – Collaboration
206	"Episode 2"	14 February 2024	692,000
Contestants: Judy – Rod Stewart expert **Luka – Cholera expert** Facundo – The Sopranos expert Sean – Bunnings expert Tom's round: Tom's subject – Stocks
207	"Episode 3"	21 February 2024	677,000
Contestants: Julie – Chocolate expert Regan – Joh Bjelke-Petersen expert **Patrice – 30 Rock expert** Matthew – Paula Abdul expert Tom's round: Tom's subject – Themed Restaurants
208	"Episode 4"	28 February 2024	623,000
Contestants: Anj – The Real Housewives of Beverly Hills expert **Paul – James Bond Movies expert** Adela – Victorian Women's Fashion expert Craig – Sydney Harbour Bridge expert Tom's round: Tom's subject – Geese
209	"Episode 5"	6 March 2024	661,000
Contestants: Ben – Shania Twain expert Julia – Women in Greek Mythology expert Susan – 7 Up Documentary Series expert **Girish – Spices expert** Tom's round: Tom's subject – Deception
210	"Episode 6"	13 March 2024	673,000
Contestants: Matt – Cronulla-Sutherland Sharks expert **Jessica – Mulan expert** Brad – Vintage Roller Skates expert Elle – Doja Cat expert Tom's round: Tom's subject – Prison
211	"Episode 7"	20 March 2024	710,000
Contestants: Zoe – Sex and the City expert Jonathan – Iggy Pop expert **Georgia – Australian Diamonds netball team expert** Rob – Land Rovers expert Tom's round: Tom's subject – Ham
212	"Episode 8"	27 March 2024	701,000
Contestants: Sasky – NASCAR expert **Bronwyn – Mercator projection expert** Thomas – Ash Barty expert Finley – Sheep shearing expert Tom's round: Tom's subject – Film festivals
213	"Episode 9"	3 April 2024	721,000
Contestants: James – LeBron James expert **Kate – Phar Lap expert** Mike – Super Smash Bros. expert Christine – Vegemite expert Tom's round: Tom's subject – Hair
214	"Episode 10"	10 April 2024	679,000
Contestants: Sam – Colonoscopy expert **Bel – Slipknot expert** Jasmine – The Lion King expert Takura – Armageddon expert Tom's round: Tom's subject – Garbage Note: This episode featured contestants who had lost previous episodes of Hard Quiz, and was titled Battle of the Duds.
215	"Episode 11"	17 April 2024	706,000
Contestants: Lucy – Catherine, Princess of Wales expert **Callum – Oysters expert** Mark – Lost in Space expert Ruby – Concorde expert Tom's round: Tom's subject – Taps
216	"Episode 12"	24 April 2024	597,000
Contestants: **Helen – When Harry Met Sally... expert** Wayne – Curling expert Patrick – The Real Housewives of Melbourne expert Melinda – Douglas Mawson expert Tom's round: Tom's subject – Worms
217	"Episode 13"	1 May 2024	702,000
Contestants: Mel – The Inbetweeners expert Reuben – Van Halen expert **Ray – America's Cup expert** Samuel – Howard government expert Tom's round: Tom's subject – Billies
218	"Episode 14"	8 May 2024	656,000
Contestants: Emily – Pompeii expert Steve – Norman Lindsay expert Keir – John Coltrane expert **Jason – Lana Del Rey expert** Tom's round: Tom's subject – Buses
219	"Episode 15"	15 May 2024	708,000
Contestants: Dawn – Mata Hari expert Sonny – Grand Theft Auto expert **Dave – Champagne expert** Lillian – The Hobbit expert Tom's round: Tom's subject – Word games
220	"Episode 16"	22 May 2024	692,000
Contestants: Dave – Alice Cooper expert Michelle – Anne of Green Gables expert **Paula – Chickens expert** Kurt – Alexander McQueen expert Tom's round: Tom's subject – Balls
221	"Episode 17"	29 May 2024	673,000
Contestants: Connor – The Last of Us expert Shweta – Shah Rukh Khan expert **Callum – DeLorean expert** Ann – Trombone expert Tom's round: Tom's subject – Gum
222	"Episode 18"	5 June 2024	583,000
Contestants: Susan – Francis Bacon expert **Fernando – Che Guevara expert** Catherine – Ted Lasso expert Shannon – Dr. Dre expert Tom's round: Tom's subject – 9
223	"Episode 19"	12 June 2024	691,000
Contestants: Evan – Ötzi the Iceman expert Madeline – Carlton Blues expert **Ellen – Babylon 5 expert** Michael – Microsoft Excel expert Tom's round: Tom's subject – Countdown
224	"Episode 20"	19 June 2024	693,000
Contestants: Mary – Kim Kardashian expert Jane – Skyhooks expert David – Geocaching expert **Cameron – Mr. Olympia expert** Tom's round: Tom's subject – Pants
225	"Episode 21"	26 June 2024	567,000
Contestants: Alex – Coldplay expert **Sylvia – As Time Goes By expert** Tony – Capital Cities expert Lizzie – Ada Lovelace expert Tom's round: Tom's subject – Moons
226	"Episode 22"	3 July 2024	658,000
Contestants: Melody – Cheap Trick expert Cameron – Spider-Man expert **Fen – Paint and Pigments expert** Eldin – Marbles expert Tom's round: Tom's subject – Nicknames
227	"Episode 23"	10 July 2024	689,000
Contestants: **Dave – Australian Masters expert** Katie – French language expert Jazz – Rage Against the Machine expert Hannah – Muriel's Wedding expert Tom's round: Tom's subject – Roundabouts
228	"Episode 24"	17 July 2024	540,000
Contestants: Seb – Dumb and Dumber expert Jared – Guns N' Roses expert Catherine – Pac-Man expert **Nigel – Lavender expert** Tom's round: Tom's subject – Predictions
229	"Episode 25"	9 October 2024	540,000
Contestants: **Joel – Australian Currency expert** Ash – Jurassic Park expert Vicki – Kakadu National Park expert Neil – Beekeeping expert Tom's round: Tom's subject – Afterthoughts Note: This episode featured contestants had lost previous episodes of Hard Quiz, and was titled Battle of the Duds.
230	"Episode 26"	16 October 2024	522,000
Contestants: Kira – The Evil Dead expert Sam – Drone racing expert Raph – Polar bears expert **Deb – Powderfinger expert** Tom's round: Tom's subject – Checks
231	"Episode 27"	23 October 2024	617,000
Contestants: Pru – Knitting expert **Dave – Great Pyramid of Giza expert** Patsy – Claudia Karvan expert Tony – Mozart expert Tom's round: Tom's subject – Panic Note: In this episode, Patsy holds the record high score of 120 after The People's Round.
232	"Episode 28"	30 October 2024	546,000
Contestants: **Alan – Tea expert** Yssy – Twin Peaks expert Andy – Sonic the Hedgehog expert Mel – Brett Lee expert Tom's round: Tom's subject – Tyra Banks
233	"Episode 29"	6 November 2024	560,000
Contestants: David – Crusades expert **Catherine – Empire Records expert** Bryce – Volkswagen Golf expert Gemma – Spice Girls expert Tom's round: Tom's subject – Jigsaw puzzles
234	"Episode 30"	13 November 2024	574,000
Contestants: Naomi – The Sims expert **Elliot – George W. Bush expert** David – Anna Pavlova expert Debbie – Billy Idol expert Tom's round: Tom's subject – Sequels Note: This episode featured contestants had lost previous episodes of Hard Quiz, and was titled Battle of the Duds.
235	"Episode 31"	20 November 2024	652,000
Contestants: Ana – Shaun Micallef expert **David – Bitcoin expert** Shen – Richard III expert Jesse – Blink-182 expert Tom's round: Tom's subject – Bed
236	"Episode 32"	27 November 2024	581,000
Contestants: Jo – Blur expert Luigi – Giro d'Italia expert **Chelsea – All Aussie Adventures expert** Michael – Blood expert Tom's round: Tom's subject – Finals
237	"Episode 33"	4 December 2024	637,000
Contestants: Aki – Serena Williams expert Kathryn – Sidney Nolan expert Tony – Harley-Davidson expert **Penelope – Clueless expert** Tom's round: Tom's subject – Bridges
238	"Episode 34"	11 December 2024	644,000
Contestants: Kev – Boeing expert Gen – Anaesthesia expert **Lily – Supernatural expert** Paul – Michael Caine expert Tom's round: Tom's subject – Nikki Webster

=== Series 10 (2025) ===
Names in Bold are the winners

No.	Title	Original release date	Australia viewers (National)
240	"Episode 1"	29 January 2025	573,000
Contestants: Tom – Suez Canal expert Julie – Jerry Seinfeld expert Frank – Australian decimal coins expert **Michelle – Crosby, Stills, Nash & Young expert** Tom's round: Tom's subject – Nepotism
241	"Episode 2"	5 February 2025	597,000
Contestants: Georgina – Australian native pigeons expert Dougie – Harpsichord expert Ali – Dirty Dancing expert **Luke – WrestleMania expert** Tom's round: Tom's subject – Weather
242	"Episode 3"	12 February 2025	557,000
Contestants: **Christa – Olivia Rodrigo expert** Jen – Breastfeeding expert Dinan – Canberra expert Rob – Sharks expert Tom's round: Tom's subject – SBS
243	"Episode 4"	19 February 2025	570,000
Contestants: Angus – Duke and Duchess of Windsor expert Noah – The Kid Laroi expert Angelique – Blythe Dolls expert **Charmaine – Shrek expert** Tom's round: Tom's subject – X-rays
244	"Episode 5"	26 February 2025	619,000
Contestants: Terry – William Wallace expert Tom – Black holes expert **Viv – The Wizard of Oz expert** Steph – Mammalian sperm expert Tom's round: Tom's subject – Mondays
245	"Episode 6"	5 March 2025	587,000
Contestants: Grace – ABBA expert **Nathan – Llamas expert** Paulette – Australian ultralight aircraft expert Nashy – Steven Universe expert Tom's round: Tom's subject – Clowns
246	"Episode 7"	12 March 2025	613,000
Contestants: Bec – US presidential assassinations expert **Brendan – Monty Python expert** Nathan – Poker expert Mel – Contraception expert Tom's round: Tom's subject – Boxes
247	"Episode 8"	19 March 2025	547,000
Contestants: **Sam – Community expert** Kara – Nail polish expert Ray – Octopuses expert Alison – The Sound of Music expert Tom's round: Tom's subject – Inflation
248	"Episode 9"	26 March 2025	570,000
Contestants: Paula – John McEnroe expert **Andrew – Cocktails expert** Jean – Amy Winehouse expert Paul – The Simpsons expert Tom's round: Tom's subject – Perfume
249	"Episode 10"	2 April 2025	633,000
Contestants: Connor – Bones expert Mary – Kim Kardashian expert **Sasky – NASCAR expert** Facundo – The Sopranos expert Tom's round: Tom's subject – Sleep Note: This episode featured contestants who had lost previous episodes of Hard Quiz, and was titled Battle of the Duds.
250	"Episode 11"	9 April 2025	598,000
Contestants: Matt – Tornadoes expert Viv – Pancreas expert Marco – Eminem expert **Georgia – Five Nights at Freddy's expert** Tom's round: Tom's subject – Redheads
251	"Episode 12"	23 April 2025	580,000
Contestants: Stella – Gene Wilder expert **Jimmy – Trixie Mattel expert** Mark – Coral expert Aru – Rafael Nadal expert Tom's round: Tom's subject – Beef
252	"Episode 13"	23 July 2025	634,000
Contestants: Sophie – Barbie expert Noel – Mona Lisa expert Stat – New York Yankees expert **Isobel – Sunscreen expert** Tom's round: Tom's subject – Paper
253	"Episode 14"	30 July 2025	689,000
Contestants: **Max – Dennis Rodman expert** Henry – Mercedes-Benz expert Jane – The Faraway Tree expert Katherine – Alkanes expert Tom's round: Tom's subject – Girl groups
254	"Episode 15"	6 August 2025	664,000
Contestants: Kellie – Rammstein expert Julio – Cochlear implant expert **Elias – It's Always Sunny in Philadelphia expert** Nicole – Annabel Crabb expert Tom's round: Tom's subject – Anarchy
255	"Episode 16"	13 August 2025	524,000
Contestants: Luke – John Deere expert Shannen – My Chemical Romance expert Leo – Groucho Marx expert **Malika – The Princess Bride expert** Tom's round: Tom's subject – Statues
256	"Episode 17"	20 August 2025	630,000
Contestants: Dawn – Mata Hari expert Kevin – Rin Tin Tin expert Judy – Rod Stewart expert **David – Crusades expert** Tom's round: Tom's subject – Memes Note: This episode featured contestants who had lost previous episodes of Hard Quiz, and was titled Battle of the Fuddy Duds.
257	"Episode 18"	27 August 2025	593,000
Contestants: **Jared – Elizabeth II expert** Sam – Punctuation expert Damien – Keytar expert Nicki – The Room expert Tom's round: Tom's subject – Beans
258	"Episode 19"	3 September 2025	675,000
Contestants: Annmarie – The Australian Census expert Charlie – Anne Boleyn expert **René – Buddy Holly expert** Rachael – Below Deck expert Tom's round: Tom's subject – International Days
259	"Episode 20"	10 September 2025	636,000
Contestants: Liam – Steely Dan expert Paul – Boogieboarding expert **Steph – Skyrim expert** Lucy – Noel Fielding expert Tom's round: Tom's subject – Woodwork
260	"Episode 21"	17 September 2025	582,000
Contestants: Paul – Peter Sellers expert **Ella – The Chats expert** Liam – Beer expert Samantha – Great Fire of London expert Tom's round: Tom's subject – Romance novels
261	"Episode 22"	24 September 2025	595,000
Contestants: **Georgie – Pearl Jam expert** Michael – Asbestos expert Umair – Meta expert Amy – The Muppets expert Tom's round: Tom's subject – Plagiarism
262	"Episode 23"	1 October 2025	613,000
Contestants: Sophie – Vanderpump Rules expert David – Martin Scorsese expert Wendy – Insulators expert **Danny – Chopin expert** Tom's round: Tom's subject – Oil
263	"Episode 24"	8 October 2025	594,000
Contestants: Chris – Teenage Mutant Ninja Turtles expert Geoff – Guillotine expert Hannah – Human circulatory system expert **Gemma – Olympic swimming expert** Tom's round: Tom's subject – Trolls
264	"Episode 25"	15 October 2025	580,000
Contestants: **Pru – Knitting expert** Sarah – Kray twins expert Cameron – Spider-Man expert James – Breaker Morant expert Tom's round: Tom's subject – Death Note: This episode featured contestants who had lost previous episodes of Hard Quiz, and was titled Battle of the Duds.
265	"Episode 26"	22 October 2025	629,000
Contestants: Andrew – Lawn bowls expert **Alex – Hyaenas expert** Geordie – Aunty Donna expert Jye – The O.C. expert Tom's round: Tom's subject – Clichés
266	"Episode 27"	29 October 2025	564,000
Contestants: Shane – Suzi Quatro expert **Anna – Multi-level marketing expert** Sadie – The Lion, the Witch and the Wardrobe expert Gavin – Dirt expert Tom's round: Tom's subject – Cheating
267	"Episode 28"	5 November 2025	614,000
Contestants: Liz – Sewage expert **Julian – Red Dwarf expert** Adam – Sydney Roosters expert Ellie – Queen Victoria's children expert Tom's round: Tom's subject – Plastic
268	"Episode 29"	12 November 2025	598,000
Contestants: **Shuban – Arsenal F.C. expert** Jacqui – Stray Kids expert Jonathan – Avatar expert Lisa – Australian Megabats expert Tom's round: Tom's subject – Airports
269	"Episode 30"	19 November 2025	589,000
Contestants: Ben – David Fincher Films expert Alex – Killer Whales expert **Julie – The B-52s expert** Mike – Vintage Sewing Machines expert Tom's round: Tom's subject – Rage
270	"Episode 31"	26 November 2025	564,000
Contestants: Martin – Concrete expert Finn – King Gizzard & the Lizard Wizard expert Freddie – Mario Kart expert **Victoria – The X-Files expert** Tom's round: Tom's subject – Lips
271	"Episode 32"	3 December 2025	554,000
Contestants: Rod – North Melbourne Kangaroos expert Peter – Steven Spielberg expert **Daniel – Ford Falcon expert** Evie – Billie Eilish expert Tom's round: Tom's subject – Musicals
272	"Episode 33"	10 December 2025	554,000
Contestants: Ben – Invasive Animals expert Rachel – Sumo expert Abby – Saw expert **Eve – Medea expert** Tom's round: Tom's subject – Universe

=== Series 11 (2026) ===
Names in Bold are the winners

No.	Title	Original release date	Australia viewers (National)
274	"Episode 1"	7 January 2026	522,000
Contestants: Manon – Quebec expert Sara-Jane – Bringing Up Baby expert **Joel – Daft Punk expert** Dennis – Rick and Morty expert Tom's round: Tom's subject – Walks
275	"Episode 2"	14 January 2026	526,000
Contestants: Catherine – French horn expert Sas – Franklin's lost expedition expert Terry – Kookaburras expert **Max – American Psycho expert** Tom's round: Tom's subject – One-hit wonders
276	"Episode 3"	21 January 2026	516,000
Contestants: **Tegan – A Nightmare on Elm Street expert** Scott – Warren Buffett expert Adam – MRI expert Mia – Curb Your Enthusiasm expert Tom's round: Tom's subject – Scotland
277	"Episode 4"	28 January 2026	517,000
Contestants: **Ryan – Fleetwood Mac expert** Matt – Mammoths expert Kismet – Aladdin expert Meredith – Grace and Frankie expert Tom's round: Tom's subject – String
278	"Episode 5"	4 February 2026	630,000
Contestants: Tanveer – Noodles expert Jess – Stefanos Tsitsipas expert Zane – Somerton Man expert **Olivia – House MD expert** Tom's round: Tom's subject – Records
279	"Episode 6"	11 February 2026	567,000
Contestants: Jo – Australian funnel-web spiders expert **Pete – State of Origin expert** Jack – North American P-51 Mustang expert Angelina – The Nanny expert Tom's round: Tom's subject – Stretching
280	"Episode 7"	18 February 2026	571,000
Contestants: Lindy – Holden Racing Team expert Blake – Brazilian jiu-jitsu expert Eimile – Geordie Shore expert **Siamak – Silence of the Lambs expert** Tom's round: Tom's subject – Spoons
281	"Episode 8"	25 February 2026	587,000
Contestants: Darcy – Highgate Cemetery expert Sarah – Psychedelics expert **Emily – Die Hard expert** Shane – Kelly Clarkson expert Tom's round: Tom's subject – Robots
282	"Episode 9"	22 July 2026	567,000
Contestants: Sara – Mazda RX-7 expert **Tamsin – Asterix expert** Andrew – Melbourne Cup expert Marty – Wonder Woman expert Tom's round: Tom's subject – Complaints
283	"Episode 10"	29 July 2026	584,000
Contestants: Steph – Mammalian sperm expert **Lizzie – Ada Lovelace expert** Liam – Steely Dan expert Luke – John Deere expert Tom's round: Tom's subject – Second Chances Note: This episode featured contestants who had lost previous episodes of Hard Quiz, and was titled Battle of the Duds.
284	"Episode 11"	5 August 2026	557,000
Contestants: Catherine – Millinery expert Jack – Murriyang (The Parkes Radio Telescope) expert **Adam – Pablo Escobar expert** Matilda – RuPaul's Drag Race expert Tom's round: Tom's subject – Kissing
285	"Episode 12"	12 August 2026	567,000
Contestants: Zoë – Dynasties of China expert **Bridie – Franz Kafka expert** Dil – Formula One expert Mark – Merino expert Tom's round: Tom's subject – Legs
286	"Episode 13"	19 August 2026	579,000
Contestants: **Ruth – Beastie Boys expert** Jon – Medieval footwear expert Dominique – NRLW expert Rico – Sacha Baron Cohen expert Tom's round: Tom's subject – Interior design
287	"Episode 14"	26 August 2026	596,000
Contestants: **Fraser – Veep expert** Elise – Cloudstreet expert Paddy – The Beach Boys expert Rose – Tumblr expert Tom's round: Tom's subject – Glue
288	"Episode 15"	2 September 2026	580,000
Contestants: **Jarrod – Mountain gorillas expert** Genevieve – How I Met Your Mother expert Sheryl – Edith Head expert Ben – General theory of relativity expert Tom's round: Tom's subject – Richard Wilkins
289	"Episode 16”	9 September 2026	527,000
Contestants: Jaeger – Frank Sinatra expert Karyn – Olympic Diving expert Gordon – Carnivorous plants expert **Tiana – Spanish language expert** Tom's round: Tom's subject – Shopping
290	"Episode 17”	16 September 2026	563,000
Contestants: Gary – F Troop expert Debi – Khabib Nurmagomedov expert **Hanlon – Crowded House expert** Zoe – Eggs expert Tom's round: Tom's subject – Things That Suck
291	"Episode 18”	23 September 2026	548,000
Contestants: Andrew – Lawn Bowls expert **Susan – Francis Bacon expert** Shane – Suzi Quatro expert Liz – Sewage expert Tom's round: Tom's subject – Nannas Note: This episode featured contestants who had lost previous episodes of Hard Quiz, and was titled Battle of the Fuddy Duds.
292	"Episode 19”	30 September 2026	515,000
Contestants: **Amy – The Last Romanovs expert** Varun – ADHD expert Sharon – Snow White expert Daim – Lady Gaga expert Tom's round: Tom's subject – The Internet
293	"Episode 20”	7 October 2026	588,000
Contestants: Lizzy – Insects expert Kieran – The Big Day Out expert Mardi – Grease expert **Oscar – Doctor Who expert** Tom's round: Tom's subject – Betrayal
294	"Episode 21”	14 October 2026	582,000
Contestants: Freya – Wind turbines expert Sepanta – Lionel Messi expert Greg – The Naked Gun movies expert Helen – Delta Goodrem expert Tom's round: Tom's subject – TBA

=== Specials ===
Names in Bold are the winners

No.	Title	Original release date	Australian viewers
71	"Celebrity Hard Quiz"	18 December 2019	613,000
Contestants: **Lucy Durack – Sleepless in Seattle expert** Waleed Aly – Batman expert Celia Pacquola – Stephen King expert Hamish Blake – Lego expert Tom's round: Tom's subject – Christmas
110	"Hard Quiz Kids Special"	23 December 2020	575,000
Contestants: Sam – The Simpsons expert **Olivia – Harry Potter expert** Nash – Melbourne Metro Rail Network expert Scarlett – Cardiothoracics expert Tom's round: Tom's subject – Teachers
148	"Hard Quiz: Has Beens"	22 December 2021	431,000
Contestants: Rhonda Burchmore – Barbie expert Tony Armstrong – Red Hot Chili Peppers expert **Tim Rogers – Joni Mitchell expert** Ann-Maree Biggar – Beauty and the Beast expert Tom's round: Tom's subject – Comebacks
173	"Mad As Hell Does Hard Quiz"	21 December 2022	458,000
Contestants: Christie Whelan Browne – The Office expert Tosh Greenslade – Joe Dirt expert Emily Taheny – Paul Kelly expert **Francis Greenslade – A Midsummer Night's Dream expert** Tom's round: Tom's subject – Hell
204	"Hard Quiz: Influencers"	20 December 2023	441,000
Contestants: Mully – Fast & Furious expert **Bridget Chant – Friends expert** Nalopia – Game of Thrones expert Ian Zaro – Beyoncé expert Tom's round: Tom's subject – Rocket Science
239	"Neighbours Does Hard Quiz"	18 December 2024	574,000
Contestants: Stefan Dennis – James Bond Movies expert Georgie Stone – Brooklyn Nine-Nine expert Alan Fletcher – The Doors expert **Madeleine West – Fleetwood Mac expert** Tom's round: Tom's subject – Neighbours
273	"Battle of the Networks"	17 December 2025	708,000
Contestants: Larry Emdur (Seven Network) – Australian Game Shows expert **Leigh Sales (ABC) – '80s TV Show Openers expert** Angela Bishop (Network 10) – Phil Collins expert Karl Stefanovic (Nine Network) – Australian Cricket expert Tom's round: Tom's subject – Marc Fennell (SBS)
