= At the Movies (Australian TV program) =

2004–2014 Australian movie review TV program

- Starring: Margaret Pomeranz; David Stratton
- Country of origin: Australia
- Original language: English
- No. of seasons: 11

Production
- Producer: Claude Gonzalez
- Running time: 26 minutes per episode

Original release
- Network: ABC
- Release: 1 July 2004 – 9 December 2014

At the Movies is an Australian television program on ABC that was hosted by film critics Margaret Pomeranz and David Stratton and presented from 2004 to 2014, where they discussed the films opening in theatres that week.

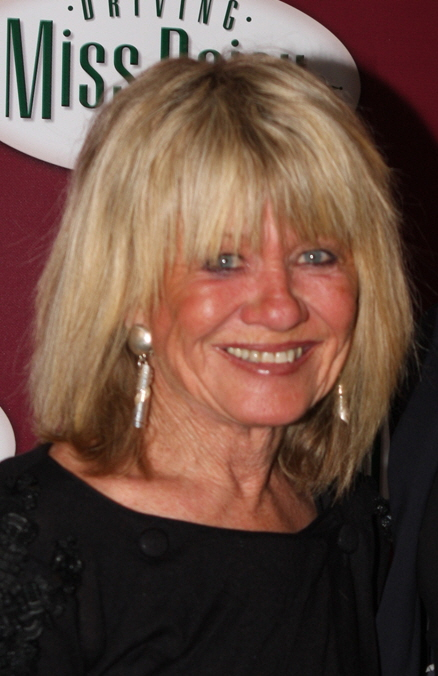
Host Margaret Pomeranz

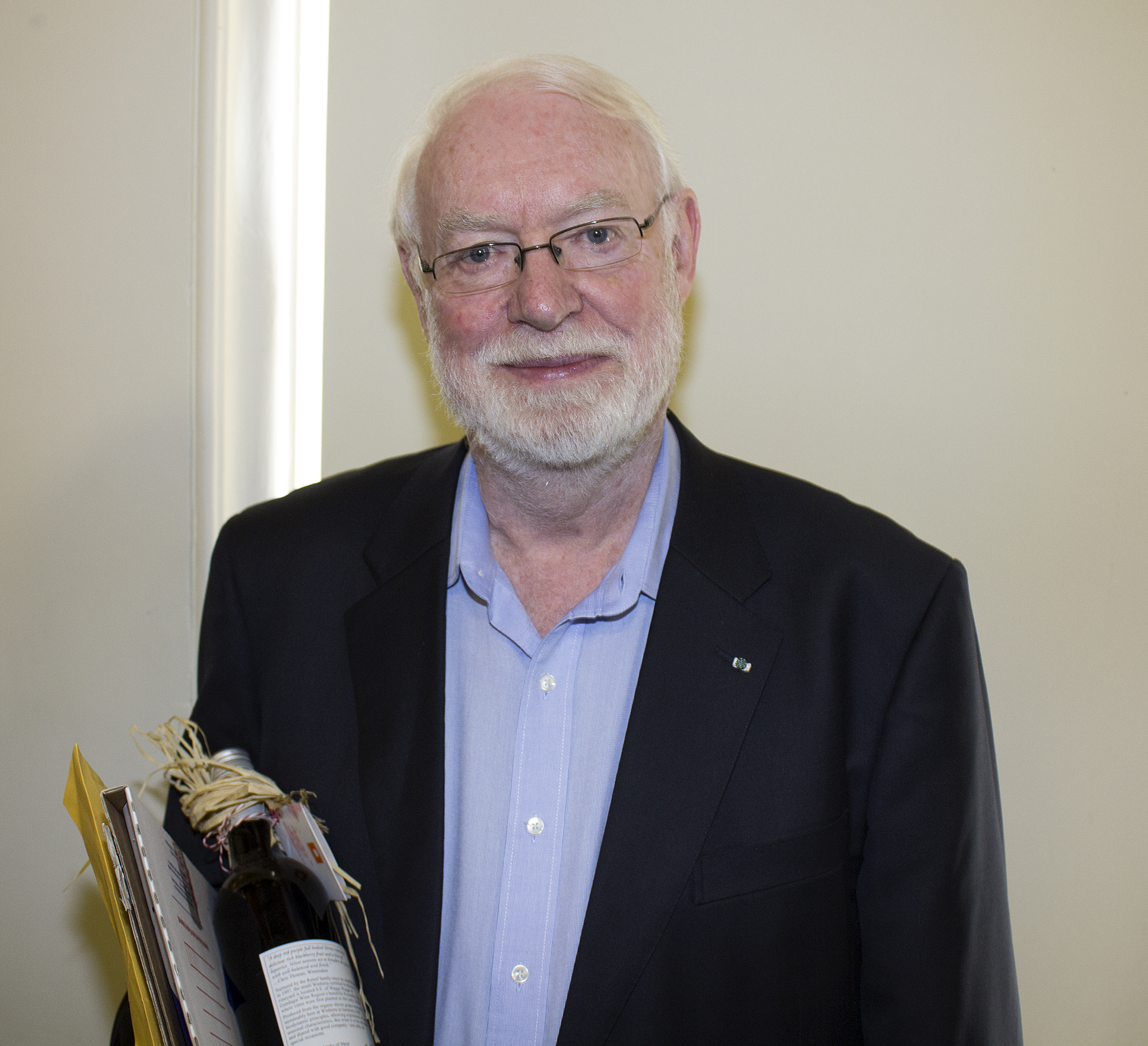
Host David Stratton

== History ==
The program, which began in mid-2004, is a continuation of the pair's earlier program The Movie Show, which aired on SBS One from 1986 to 2004. The pair left SBS after expressing dissatisfaction with high-level decisions.

The weekly half-hour program consists of film reviews and discussions as well as interviews with cast and crew members. The hosts also occasionally broadcast from film events such as the Cannes Film Festival.

The pair's 25 years of presenting film reviews on television was celebrated in a special show on 26 October 2011, filmed before an audience and special guests, hosted by Cate Blanchett and Geoffrey Rush.

On 16 September 2014, Stratton and Pomeranz announced they would be retiring at the end of the 2014 series. The final episode aired on 9 December 2014, and Stratton and Pomeranz said farewell to over 700,000 viewers, making it one of the most-watched season finales on the ABC in the history of the station.

== 5-star films ==
Only seven films have achieved a perfect 5-star rating by both Pomeranz and Stratton.

- Good Night, and Good Luck
- Brokeback Mountain
- No Country for Old Men
- Samson and Delilah
- A Separation
- Amour
- Birdman or (the Unexpected Virtue of Ignorance)

In the previous SBS format, several films achieved 5 stars from both Margaret and David, including films such as Goodfellas, The Thin Red Line, Schindler's List, 2001: A Space Odyssey, Aliens, Eyes Wide Shut, Russian Ark, The Thin Blue Line, Evil Angels, Return Home, The Piano, Lantana, and Three Colours: Red.

== In other media ==
Pomeranz and Stratton both appeared in a parody of themselves and At the Movies in the fourth episode of the ABC show Lawrence Leung's Choose Your Own Adventure. They have also appeared in the ABC shows The Chaser's War on Everything, Review with Myles Barlow, Good Game and Dance Academy. Pomeranz has also appeared in recurring spoofs of the show on The Weekly with Charlie Pickering. In December 2020, they appeared in a spoof YouTube video reviewing the year 2020. Around 2006 Hopscotch Entertainment released a DVD Margaret & David at the Movies interactive quiz, hosted by Stratton and Pomeranz, containing around 1500 film-based questions (and answers), with list of rules and scoresheet.

In 2025, Alexei Toliopoulos and Zachary Ruane will be touring a comedy stage show Refused Classification based upon Margaret and David's historical legal battles surrounding film censorship, focusing in particular on their relation to Ken Park.
