= Richard Fejo =

Richard Fejo, also known as Uncle Richie, is a Larrakia elder from Darwin in the Northern Territory of Australia.

== Biography ==
The youngest of seven children, Fejo is of direct male descent of the Larrakia people, the traditional owners of Darwin, through his father James Fejo, grandfather Juma Fejo and great-grandfather King Charles. His mother, Nangala Lorna Fejo was Warumungu, an advocate for the Stolen Generations recognised in Kevin Rudd's speech during the Australia Government's Apology to Australia's Indigenous peoples in 2008.

As a Larrakia elder, Fejo has been offering Welcome to Country ceremonies in Darwin since 1994. In 2020 he was invited to perform the Welcome to Country when the Australian Football League held its Dreamtime at the 'G match in Darwin.

He is the senior elder on campus at Flinders University, where he was awarded an Honorary Doctorate in 2022.

He is on the board of the National Disability Insurance Agency and the NT chair of the Australia Day Council of the Northern Territory. He was the chair of the Darwin Waterfront Corporation until 2024 when he resigned over Northern Territory Government policies to lower the age of criminal responsibility in the Northern Territory to 10 years old.

Richie is also a comedian and singer-songwriter, performing regularly in Darwin and across Australia. He was in Darwin when it was hit by Cyclone Tracy.
