= Hard Quiz Kids =

Australian game quiz show

- Presented by: Tom Gleeson
- Country of origin: Australia
- Original language: English
- No. of series: 3
- No. of episodes: 30

Production
- Executive producers: John Tabbagh; Chris Walker
- Producers: Kevin Whyte; Charlie Pickering; Tom Gleeson
- Production locations: Melbourne, Victoria
- Running time: 30 minutes
- Production company: Thinkative Television

Original release
- Network: ABC Family
- Release: 8 June 2024 – present

Related
- Hard Quiz

Hard Quiz Kids is an Australian television comedy children's quiz show which premiered on ABC Family on 8 June 2024. Hosted by Tom Gleeson, the show is a spin-off of the quiz show Hard Quiz, also hosted by Gleeson. It is filmed at the ABC Melbourne studios in Southbank in front of a studio audience. Contestants are mainly aged from 10 to 13 years old, although some 14-year-olds participated.

It is routine for Gleeson to mock the contestants or their subject and contestants will often make jokes at Gleeson's expense, all of which is accepted and appears to be encouraged.

Hard Quiz Kids was nominated for the 2025 and 2026 Logie Award for Best Children’s Program. Hard Quiz Kids was nominated for the 2025 AACTA Award for Best Children’s Program

== Format ==
Each episode of Hard Quiz Kids features four contestants, each of whom has selected a specialist subject area. No subject area (including those selected in "Tom's Round") may be used more than once. Each correct answer is worth 5 points, while each wrong answer costs 5 points.

=== Expert Round ===
The contestants, in turn, each receive five questions regarding their specialist subject areas. They must buzz in to respond and are locked out of a question if they got it wrong or took too long to give an answer, giving the other players a chance to answer. A contestant may attempt to answer a question from another contestant's subject area. This is known as "The Steal". If a Steal is successful, the contestant receives 10 points but will only lose 5 points for an incorrect Steal attempt.

=== Tom's Round ===
The contestants, using their monitors, lock in their answers to each of the five multiple-choice questions from a subject Gleeson has chosen in advance. A selected response must be locked in by pressing the red buzzer. Each question has 4 options except for the last question, which has 6 options and is played for double points (10 points for a right answer). The lowest scorer at the end of this round is out of the game, with their podium now displaying the words "Too Soft".

=== The People's Round (Against the Clock) ===
In this round, general knowledge questions are given out within a rather vague time limit (between 35 and over 90 seconds, depending on the episode). The contestants, again, buzz in to respond. The lowest scorer when time expires is also out of the game.

=== Tiebreaker: Hard-Off ===
In the event of a tie for lowest scorer when an elimination is required, the tie is broken with a "hard-off", where Gleeson presents two options for a given question (often pertaining to the relative difficulty of two given tasks or physical hardness of two materials), which the first contestant to buzz in then answers. If the answering contestant chooses correctly, the other contestant is eliminated and vice versa if the answer given is incorrect.

When more than two contestants play a hard-off, multiple questions can be played. If a contestant answers correctly, they are safe from elimination and the hard-off continues until only one contestant is not safe. If a contestant answers incorrectly, they are eliminated and all other contestant in the hard-off become safe.

=== Final round: Hard Quiz (Head to Head) ===
The final two contestants alternate answering questions regarding their chosen subject area in a best of five penalty shootout-style format with the winner receiving a trophy – the limited-edition big brass mug. The contestant also gets to sign off the show with the catchphrase "Thanks for playing, hard".

If the final two contestants have got the same amount of correct answers after five questions, an extra question will be asked to each contestant on their specialty subject.

==== Tom's Tiebreaker ====
After the extra questions and if the players are still tied, one numerical question will be asked on Tom's specialty subject of the day. Each contestant will be required to guess the correct answer, starting with the player that got the first question during the final round, and the closer of the two wins the show.

== Series overview ==
| Series | Episodes | Originally released | |
| Series | Episodes | First released | Last released |
|---|---|---|---|
| 1 | 10 | 8 June 2024 | 10 August 2024 |
| 2 | 10 | 4 October 2025 | 6 December 2025 |
| 3 | 10 | 10 October 2026 | TBA |

== Episodes ==
=== Series 1 ===
Names in Bold are the winners

| No. | Title | Original release date |
|---|---|---|
| 1 | "Episode 1" | 8 June 2024 |
Contestants: **Aston - Birds of prey expert** Callista - Greek Mythology expert Toby - Minecraft expert Pippa - wives of Henry VIII expert Tom's round: Tom's subject – Grown-ups
| 2 | "Episode 2" | 15 June 2024 |
Contestants: Toby - Hamilton expert Gretta - Leadbeater's possums expert Thomas - Caterpillar earthmovers expert **Emma - Seinfeld expert** Tom's round: Tom's subject – Telephones
| 3 | "Episode 3" | 22 June 2024 |
Contestants: Olivia - Sam Kerr expert Paris - Babushka dolls expert **Leela - 80s Aussie rock bands expert** Xavier - The Lego Batman Movie expert Tom's round: Tom's subject – Real estate
| 4 | "Episode 4" | 29 June 2024 |
Contestants: Max - Capital Cities expert Ayesha - Hello Kitty expert Rav - Aviation Disasters expert **Connor - The Wizard of Oz expert** Tom's round: Tom's subject – Jumping
| 5 | "Episode 5" | 6 July 2024 |
Contestants: **Sam - Flags expert** Aisha - Taylor Swift expert Casey - Fire Rescue Victoria expert Matilda - Wings of Fire expert Tom's round: Tom's subject – Theme Parks
| 6 | "Episode 6" | 13 July 2024 |
Contestants: Jimmy - Saltwater crocodiles expert **Milly - The Legend of Zelda: Tears of the Kingdom expert** Max - World War II expert Josie - The Loud House expert Tom's round: Tom's subject – Chips
| 7 | "Episode 7" | 20 July 2024 |
Contestants: Shahbaaz - Guru Nanak Dev Ji expert Layla - The Norris Nuts expert **Fleur - Mean Girls The Musical expert** Eitan - Mickey Mouse expert Tom's round: Tom's subject – Astrophysics
| 8 | "Episode 8" | 27 July 2024 |
Contestants: Khean - Anne Frank expert Aaradhya - Space Travel expert Imogen - Microraptor expert **Heath - Puffing Billy Railway expert** Tom's round: Tom's subject – Philosophy
| 9 | "Episode 9" | 3 August 2024 |
Contestants: Bridget - H_{2}O: Just Add Water expert Shani - Quokkas expert Hugo - Taj Mahal expert **Ollie - The Beatles expert** Tom's round: Tom's subject – Dessert
| 10 | "Episode 10" | 10 August 2024 |
Contestants: **Quinn - Kraftwerk expert** George - Ants expert Riham - Lego Ninjago expert Thea - Percy Jackson expert Tom's round: Tom's subject – Driving

=== Series 2 ===
| No. | Title | Original release date |
|---|---|---|
| 1 | "Episode 1" | 4 October 2025 |
Contestants: Mila - Bluey expert Inaya - Solar system expert Gus - Godzilla and the Monsterverse expert **Carlos - Roblox expert** Tom's round: Tom's subject – Dress-ups
| 2 | "Episode 2" | 11 October 2025 |
Contestants: Shanvitha - Young Sheldon expert Chase - Mr. Olympia expert **Naomi - Harry Styles expert** Luca - Cassowaries expert Tom's round: Tom's subject – Sugar
| 3 | "Episode 3" | 18 October 2025 |
Contestants: Campbell - Star Trek expert **Frankie - Pitch Perfect expert** Elijah - Cristiano Ronaldo expert Audrey - Nevermoor expert Tom's round: Tom's subject – Enemies
| 4 | "Episode 4" | 25 October 2025 |
Contestants: **Zak - Australian politics expert** Isla - Elephants expert Angus - Toy Story expert Audrey - Stray Kids expert Tom's round: Tom's subject – Slang
| 5 | "Episode 5" | 1 November 2025 |
Contestants: Hugo - Fungi expert Lila - Ned Kelly expert **Jessica - Charlie and the Chocolate Factory expert** Maksin - Lin-Manuel Miranda expert Tom's round: Tom's subject – Fire
| 6 | "Episode 6" | 8 November 2025 |
Contestants: **Seb - The Listies expert** Kolo - Homer's The Odyssey expert Josephine - My Chemical Romance expert Lyra - Orangutans expert Tom's round: Tom's subject – Snow
| 7 | "Episode 7" | 15 November 2025 |
Contestants: Will - Lego expert Carla - Olivia Rodrigo expert Chihiro - Warrior Cats expert **Lochlan - Melbourne Trams expert** Tom's round: Tom's subject – Rocks
| 8 | "Episode 8" | 22 November 2025 |
Contestants: Veda - Dolphins expert **Viyona - Jasprit Bumrah expert** Tyler - Titanic expert Hrishi - Pluto expert Tom's round: Tom's subject – Fruits & Vegetables
| 9 | "Episode 9" | 29 November 2025 |
Contestants: Noah - Pokémon expert **Anja - Cleopatra expert** Felix - Cats the Musical expert Clancy - Kath & Kim expert Tom's round: Tom's subject – Farts
| 10 | "Episode 10" | 6 December 2025 |
Contestants: Ned - Dungeons & Dragons expert **Jon - Inca Empire expert** Mischa - Lilo & Stitch expert Peyton - Modern Family expert Tom's round: Tom's subject – Pets

=== Series 3 ===
| No. | Title | Original release date |
|---|---|---|
| 1 | "Episode 1" | 10 October 2026 |
Contestants: Olive - Ariana Grande expert **Hugo - Fortnite** expert Mia - Doctor Who expert Ryan - Dinosaurs expert Tom's round: Tom's subject – The Economy
| 2 | "Episode 2" | 17 October 2026 |
Contestants: Leela - Wednesday expert **Florence - A Midsummer Night's Dream** expert Ayush - Bangladesh expert Max - Diary of a Wimpy Kid expert Tom's round: Tom's subject – Surprises
| 3 | "Episode 3" | 24 October 2026 |
Contestants: Liora - The Hunger Games expert **Joe - Lee Kernaghan expert** Olive - Ball Pythons expert Ryder - The London Underground expert Tom's round: Tom's subject – Sandwiches

== Awards and nominations ==
| Year | Award | Category | Nominee(s) | Result | Ref. |
|---|---|---|---|---|---|
| 2025 | 14th AACTA Awards | Best Children's Series | Hard Quiz Kids | Nominated | |
| 2025 | TV Week Logies | Best Children's Program | Hard Quiz Kids | Nominated | |
| 2026 | AACTA Awards (15th) | Best Children's Series | Hard Quiz Kids | Nominated | |
| 2026 | TV Week Logies | Best Children's Program | Hard Quiz Kids | Nominated | |
