= Stephen Crain =

Australian psycholinguist

Stephen Crain FASSA is the director of the ARC Centre of Excellence in Cognition and its Disorders (CCD), and a distinguished professor at Macquarie University in the Department of Linguistics. He is a well-known researcher specializing in language acquisition, focusing specifically on syntax and semantics. Crain views language acquisition as based on language-specific faculties, and he conducts his research in the tradition of Chomskyan generative grammar. Recently, Crain has proposed that language is based on a universal logical system, and he has begun to explore the neural correlates of language acquisition from a cross-linguistic perspective using magnetoencephalography (MEG). Crain received a BA in philosophy from the University of California, Los Angeles in 1971 and a PhD in cognitive science with an emphasis in linguistics from the University of California, Irvine in 1980. Crain was employed as a professor of linguistics at the University of Connecticut from 1986 to 1995. During that time he was also a senior scientist at Haskins Laboratories in New Haven, Connecticut. After leaving UConn, he took a position as professor of linguistics at the University of Maryland, College Park, from 1995 to 2003, before accepting a position as a professor of cognitive science at Macquarie in 2004, where he has remained since. He was deputy director of the Macquarie Centre for Cognitive Science from 2004 until 2010, and director of the Centre for Language Sciences from 2007 until 2010. He led the successful bid for an ARC Centre of Excellence in Cognition and its Disorders, which is funded from 2011 until 2017.

Crain was awarded an Australian Research Council Federation Fellowship (2004–2009), and is a Fellow of the Academy of Social Sciences in Australia (2006–current). He is currently the chair of the National Committee on Mind and Brain (Australian Academy of Science), and is a presidential nominee on the MIT Corporation Visiting Committee for the Department of Linguistics and Philosophy. Crain is a visiting professor at the Beijing Language and Culture University, China, and at the Kanazawa Institute of Technology, Japan. He was appointed Macquarie University Distinguished Professor in 2010.

Crain is on the executive board of the Society for Language Development, the advisory board of Language Acquisition, and the editorial boards of Semantics and Pragmatics, the Journal of Child Language, Biolinguistics, and the Cambridge University Press, Linguistics Series. He has been invited to speak at over fifty international conferences. His recent research grants include an ARC Discovery grant to study the acquisition of logical words in English, Chinese and Japanese, an ARC LIEF grant to build the Southern Hemisphere's first MEG (magnetoencephalography) brain-imaging laboratory, and an ARC Linkage Industrial Partners grant (with the Kanazawa Institute of Technology and the Yokogawa Electric Corporation) to build the world's first MEG system designed for the study of language processing in preschool-aged children. For the last decade, Crain's research has focused on children's acquisition of semantic knowledge, in particular young children's knowledge of logical expressions. Much of this has been cross-linguistic research, with a particular focus on Mandarin Chinese. Some of Crain's recent work is summarized in a 2012 book, The Emergence of Meaning, published by Cambridge University Press.
