= John Mathews (professor) =

Australian professor of global strategy

John A. Mathews (born 5 February 1946) is an Australian professor of competitive dynamics and global strategy. He currently holds the Eni Chair of Competitive Dynamics and Global Strategy at LUISS Guido Carli University, in Rome, and concurrently holds a Chair of Strategy at the Macquarie Graduate School of Management, Macquarie University, in Sydney.

Mathews has focused on the dynamics of technological catch-up by East Asian countries in high-tech industries, semiconductors, flat panel displays and most recently in alternative energy industries, solar photovoltaics and LEDs. He has developed dynamic strategy frameworks for analyzing these processes, and formulated a strategic synthesis in terms of the fundamental categories of resources, activities and routines. His most recent work applies this framework to explicating the reasons for success of industrial clusters, particularly those found in Taiwan, China and India.

His book published in 2006, Strategizing, Disequilibrium and Profit (Stanford University Press), took these issues as framework to explore the evolution of industries and strategizing behaviors of firms theoretically. Strongly influenced by Joseph A. Schumpeter, Mathews viewed the disequilibrium and the dynamics of the economic system as both a setting and outcome of firms’ strategizing behaviours. Entrepreneurship plays a central role in creating the bundles of resources, activities and routines.

His work (in 2010/11) focuses on the intersection between the development of new low-carbon industries and renewable energies; the rise of China and India and their pursuit of an East Asian model of development and highly-focused industrial clusters; and the adaptation of the capitalist economic system with its enormous growth and innovation potential to the demands of operating within natural ecological limits – such as within the framework of a ‘Circular Economy’ as advanced in China.

== Major publications ==
1. Tiger Technology: The Creation of a Semiconductor Industry in East Asia(Cambridge University Press, 2000) (with Dong-Sung Cho)
2. Organizing in the knowledge age: Anticipating the cellular form, Academy of Management Executive (with RE Miles, CC Snow, G Miles and HJ Coleman)
3. Dragon multinationals: New players in 21st century globalization, Asia-Pacific Journal of Management, 2006 (Winner of Best Paper prize in APJM)
4. A Silicon Valley of the East: Creating Taiwan’s semiconductor industry, California Management Review, 1999
5. Dragon Multinational, (Oxford University Press, 2002)
6. Competitive advantages of the latecomer firm: A resource-based view, Asia Pacific Journal of Management, 2002
7. Origins and dynamics of Taiwan’s R&D consortia, Research Policy, 2002
8. Fashioning a new Korean model out of the crisis, Cambridge Journal of Economics, 1998
9. National systems of economic learning in East Asia, International Journal of Technology Management, 1999
10. A Silicon Island of the East: Semiconductor industry in Singapore, California Management Review, 1999
