= Dong-Sung Cho =

South Korean researcher (born 1949)

- Born: 12 January 1949 (age 77); Seoul, South Korea
- Education: Seoul National University (BBA); Harvard Business School (PhD)
- Dong-Sung Cho
- Hangul: 조동성
- Hanja: 趙東成
- RR: Jo Dongseong
- MR: Cho Tongsŏng

Dong-Sung Cho (born 1949) is a Korean educator and scholar.

His research has focused on business strategy, sustainability, and national competitiveness.

== Early life and education ==
A native of Seoul, Dong-Sung Cho graduated from Seoul National University with a Bachelor of Business Administration degree and earned his doctoral degree in Business Administration from Harvard Business School. Upon graduation, he worked at Gulf Oil for 2 years before becoming the youngest professor at Seoul National University.

== Career ==
=== Seoul National University (1978–2014) ===
From 1978 to 2014, Dong-Sung Cho was Professor of Strategy and International Business at Seoul National University, serving as the Dean of the SNU College of Business Administration (2001–2003) and the Dean of the Graduate School of International and Area Studies (1999–2001).

=== Cheung Kong Graduate School of Business (2014–2016) ===
From 2014 to 2016, he served as Professor of Strategy at the Cheung Kong Graduate School of Business (CKGSB), an American modeled business school in Beijing, China.

=== Incheon National University Presidency (2016–2020) ===
From 2016 to 2020, he served as President of Incheon National University.

=== Leadership roles in higher education ===
From 2017 to 2019, Dr. Cho served as the president of the Federation of University Presidents representing 32 regional universities in Gyeonggi Province and Incheon. From 2018 to 2020, he was Chairman of the Korean University Accreditation Institute which is given the authority by the Ministry of Education to accredit 190 universities in Korea every 5 years.

=== Visiting professorships ===
He was a visiting professor at Harvard Business School, University of Michigan, Boston University, Duke University, INSEAD in France, Helsinki School of Economics and Business Administration (now Aalto University), University of Sydney, the University of Tokyo, Hitotsubashi University, Peking University, Zhejiang University and Nankai University.

=== Current positions ===
Currently he is Professor Emeritus of Strategy & International Business at Seoul National University and Chairman of the Institute for Industrial Policy Studies (IPS) in Korea. IPS carries out empirical studies on worldwide industrial policies and has published annual reports on national brand valuations since 2000. Additionally, he is the 2nd President of the Hanseatic League of Universities (HLU), an alliance of more than 100 universities worldwide. In 2019, the Hanseatic League of Universities (HLU) launched the World's Universities with Real Impact (WURI) ranking system. During that period, Cho served as the president of HLU, which co-presents the annual rankings with the United Nations Institute for Training and Research (UNITAR), the Taylor Institute of Franklin University Switzerland (TIFUS), and the Institute for Policy and Strategy on National Competitiveness (IPSNC).

He also serves as Board Director of the Korea Professional Football League, Chairman of the Board of the National Nature Trust, Honorary Consul General of Finland in Seoul Dean of the Corps of Honorary Consuls in Korea, and Honorary Chairman of the Institute of K-Brand Promotion.

== Development and research ==
Dong-Sung Cho developed his mechanism-based view (MBV) theory as a new way of looking at strategic management theory differentiating from the aspects of resource-based theories of Jay Barney or Michael Porter. Cho developed the Ser-M model, which provides a holistic view of organizational strategy.

== Publications ==
Cho published 115 academic papers in major journals. Among the 70 books that he authored or coauthored, 19 are in English and 5 in Chinese. He also has written three novels.

== Awards and honors ==
In 2007, he received the Order of Service Merit - Yellow Stripes award from the government of Korea. Maeil Economic Daily listed Cho among leading management scholars in Korea in 2010. In 2015, the President of Finland awarded him The Knight, First Class of the Order of the White Rose of Finland.

Cho received honorary doctoral degrees from Inje University, Busan in 2007 and Aalto University, Helsinki in 2011.
