= Pat Michie =

Australian psychologist

Patricia Therese Michie FASSA (née O'Hara) is emeritus Professor of Psychology, and co-director of the Schizophrenia Program of the Priority Research Centre in Translational Neuroscience and Mental Health at the University of Newcastle.

== Career ==
Michie's significant research in mismatch negativity (MMN) provided the first evidence for MMN as a potential early marker for schizophrenia. Her collaboration in this area with Dr Rebbekah Atkinson and Professor Ulrich Schall (also from the University of Newcastle), found two potential markers, which could allow early intervention, and potentially increase the chance of successful long-term treatments. Their resulting paper, published in Biological Psychiatry in 2012, was one of the most highly cited papers that year, as reported by the Schizophrenic Research Institute.

Since her retirement, in May 2009, she has focussed on animal models of schizophrenia using MMN as an endophenotype. She has also published extensively on auditory and visual selection attention, stop-signal inhibition and task-switching. She now works full-time in research with no administrative or teaching responsibilities. She has on-going research collaborators with numerous colleagues at the University of Newcastle, and with other Australian researchers based in Perth, Sydney, Wollongong, Melbourne and Brisbane as well international researchers in Finland and Japan.

== Qualifications ==
- PhD, Macquarie University
- Bachelor of Arts (Honours), University of New England – graduated 1963

== Current positions ==
- Emeritus Professor of Psychology
- Co-director of the Schizophrenia Program of the Priority Research Centre in Translational Neuroscience and Mental Health at the University of Newcastle
- Elected Fellow of the Academy of the Social Sciences in Australia
- Chair of the National Committee of Brain and Mind of the Australian Academy of Science

== Prior positions ==
Prior to retirement, Michie held the positions of:

- Acting Deputy Vice Chancellor (Research)
- Pro-Vice Chancellor (Research), and
- Professor of Psychology at the University of Newcastle.

Michie also previously held professorial positions at the University of Western Australia and Macquarie University.

== Publications ==
Michie has a large number of published journal articles and conference papers, dating back to 1970. for a complete list refer to her staff profile at the University of Newcastle.

== Media references ==
- All in the mind: Fragmented Minds Part 2 – ABC Radio National Podcast. Lynne Malcolm: Saturday 8 April 2006 1:00PM
- Newcastle Herald Article: University in schizophrenia DNA breakthrough By BELINDA-JANE DAVIS 23 July 2014, 10 p.m
- The Maitland Mercury: Insight into schizophrenia By Emma Swain 24 July 2014, midnight
