= Hard Quiz =

Australian game quiz show

- Presented by: Tom Gleeson
- Country of origin: Australia
- Original language: English
- No. of series: 11
- No. of episodes: 281 (list of episodes)

Production
- Production locations: Melbourne, Victoria
- Running time: 30 minutes
- Production company: Thinkative Television

Original release
- Network: ABC TV
- Release: 19 October 2016 – present

Related
- Hard Quiz Kids

Hard Quiz is an Australian television comedy quiz show which premiered on the Australian Broadcasting Corporation (ABC) on 19 October 2016. Hosted by Tom Gleeson, the show is a spin-off of his "Hard Chat" segment on the satirical television news program The Weekly with Charlie Pickering. It is filmed at the ABC Melbourne studios in Southbank in front of a studio audience.

It is routine for Gleeson to mock the contestants or their subject and contestants will often make jokes at Gleeson's expense, all of which is accepted and appears to be encouraged.

Gleeson has claimed he was surprised by the success of the program, saying he had given up hope of being a star.

On 24 May 2019, Gleeson announced he was stepping down as host and quitting the program via a media release. On 26 May 2019, Gleeson was announced as a nominee for the Gold Logie Award for Most Popular Personality on Australian Television. He later tweeted that he would "un-axe" the show if he wins the Gold Logie. Gleeson subsequently won the Gold Logie and the show was announced to be returning on 31 July 2019.

It was announced by Gleeson on 31 July 2019, in a radio interview with Triple M, that the show's return in 2020 for its fifth series would see it expand to 40 new episodes.

== Format ==
Each episode of Hard Quiz features four contestants, each of whom has selected a specialist subject area. No subject area (including those selected in "Tom's Round") may be used more than once. Each correct answer is worth 5 points, while each wrong answer costs 5 points.

=== Expert Round ===
The contestants, in turn, each receive five questions regarding their specialist subject areas. They must buzz in to respond and are locked out of a question if they got it wrong or took too long to give an answer, giving the other players a chance to answer. A contestant may attempt to answer a question from another contestant's subject area. This is known as "Stealing an answer". If a Steal is successful, the contestant receives 10 points but will only lose 5 points for an incorrect Steal attempt (in series 1, a failed Steal resulted in the contestant losing 10 points).

=== Tom's Round ===
The contestants, using their monitors, lock in their answers to each of the five multiple-choice questions from a subject Gleeson has chosen in advance. A selected response must be locked in by pressing the red buzzer. Each question has 4 options except for the last question, which has 6 options and is played for double points (10 points for a right answer). The lowest scorer at the end of this round is out of the game, with their podium now displaying the words "Too Soft".

=== The People's Round (Against the Clock) ===
In this round, general knowledge questions are given out within a rather vague time limit (between 35 and over 90 seconds, depending on the episode). The contestants, again, buzz in to respond. The lowest scorer when time expires is also eliminated.

=== Tiebreaker: Hard-Off ===
In the event of a tie for lowest scorer when an elimination is required, the tie is broken with a "hard-off", where Gleeson presents two options for a given question (often pertaining to the relative difficulty of two given tasks or physical hardness of two materials), which the first contestant to buzz in then answers. If the answering contestant chooses correctly, the other contestant is eliminated and vice versa if the answer given is incorrect.

When more than two contestants play a hard-off, multiple questions can be played. If a contestant answers correctly, they are safe from elimination and the hard-off continues until only one contestant is not safe. If a contestant answers incorrectly, they are eliminated and all other contestants in the hard-off become safe.

=== Final round: Hard Quiz (Head to Head) ===
The final two contestants alternate answering questions regarding their chosen subject area in a best of five penalty shootout-style format with the winner receiving a trophy – the limited-edition big brass mug, or in the case of the "Battle of The Duds" episodes, the aforementioned big brass mug with a hole in the bottom. The contestant also gets to sign off the show with the catchphrase "Thanks for playing, hard".

If the final two contestants have got the same amount of correct answers after five questions, an extra question will be asked to each contestant on their specialty subject.

==== Tom's Tiebreaker ====
After the extra questions and if the players are still tied, one numerical question will be asked on Tom's specialty subject of the day. Each contestant will be required to guess the correct answer, starting with the player that got the first question during the final round, and the closer of the two wins the show.

== Awards ==
Year	Award	Category	Nominee(s)	Result	Ref.
2017	7th AACTA Awards	Best Light Entertainment Series	Hard Quiz	Nominated	
2018	8th AACTA Awards	Best Entertainment Program	Hard Quiz	Nominated	
2018	Logie Awards of 2018	Most Popular Entertainment Program	Hard Quiz	Nominated	
2019	Logie Awards of 2019	Most Popular Personality on Australian Television	Tom Gleeson	Won	
2019	Logie Awards of 2019	Most Popular Presenter	Tom Gleeson	Nominated	
2019	Logie Awards of 2019	Most Popular Entertainment Program	Hard Quiz	Nominated	
2019	AACTA Awards (9th)	Best Light Entertainment Television Series	Hard Quiz	Nominated	
2020	AACTA Awards (10th)	Best Light Entertainment Television Series	Hard Quiz	Nominated	
2021	AACTA Awards (11th)	Best Light Entertainment Television Series	Hard Quiz	Won	
2021	AACTA Awards (11th)	Best Comedy Performer	Tom Gleeson	Nominated	
2021	AACTA Awards (11th)	Favourite Television Host	Tom Gleeson	Nominated	
2022	Logie Awards of 2022	Most Popular Personality on Australian Television	Tom Gleeson	Nominated	
2022	Logie Awards of 2022	Most Popular Presenter	Tom Gleeson	Nominated	
2022	Logie Awards of 2022	Most Popular Entertainment Program	Hard Quiz	Nominated	
2022	Logie Awards of 2022	Most Outstanding Entertainment or Comedy Program	Hard Quiz	Nominated	
2022	AACTA Awards (12th)	Best Comedy Program	Hard Quiz	Nominated	
2022	AACTA Awards (12th)	Best Comedy Performer	Tom Gleeson	Won	
2023	Logie Awards of 2023	Most Popular Entertainment Program	Hard Quiz	Nominated	
2023	Logie Awards of 2023	Most Outstanding Entertainment Program	Hard Quiz	Nominated	
2024	AACTA Awards (13th)	Best Comedy Entertainment Program	Hard Quiz	Won	
2024	AACTA Awards (13th)	Best Comedy Performer	Tom Gleeson	Nominated	
2024	Logie Awards of 2024	Best Comedy Entertainment Program	Hard Quiz	Nominated	
2025	AACTA Awards (14th)	Best Comedy Entertainment Program	Hard Quiz	Won	
2025	AACTA Awards (14th)	Best Comedy Performer	Tom Gleeson	Won	
2025	Logie Awards of 2025	Best Comedy Entertainment Program	Hard Quiz	Nominated	
2026	AACTA Awards (15th)	Best Comedy Entertainment Program	Hard Quiz	Won	
2026	AACTA Awards (15th)	Best Comedy Performer	Tom Gleeson	Won	
2026	Logie Awards of 2026	Best Comedy Entertainment Program	Hard Quiz	Nominated	

== Hard Quiz Kids ==
In May 2024, a version of Hard Quiz featuring 10 to 13 year old contestants, titled Hard Quiz Kids was announced. It premiered on ABC Family and ABC iView on 8 June 2024. A second season premiered on 4 October 2025. A third season will premiere on 10 October 2026.

== Merchandise ==
In 2020, a board game for Hard Quiz was released, titled Hard Quiz The Game, and can be played with 3–6 players. It was produced by University Games. In 2023, a Fast Game edition was released.

== International adaptation ==
In 2020, a Dutch version of the show called Hard Spel premiered, hosted by comedian Richard Groenendijk (nl).

== See also ==
- The Weekly with Charlie Pickering
- The Einstein Factor
- Hard Quiz Kids
