= Michael K. Morgan =

Australian neurosurgeon (born 1956)

Michael K. Morgan AO
- Born: 25 November 1956 (age 69); Royal Tunbridge Wells, Kent, England, United Kingdom
- Citizenship: Australian
- Education: University of Sydney Macquarie University
- Awards: MBBS, MMedEd, MD, DSc
- Scientific career
- Fields: Neurosurgery

Michael Kerin Morgan AO (born 25 November 1956) is an Australian neurosurgeon. Morgan is Emeritus Professor at Macquarie University. Morgan is a retired cerebrovascular surgeon at Macquarie University Hospital, Sydney.

Morgan was born in Royal Tunbridge Wells in Kent, England, to Dr Frank and Sue Morgan of Coogee Sydney, and returned with his family to Australia in 1957. He attended St Patrick's College Strathfield. He completed his medical degree at the University of Sydney in 1980 and his M.D. in 1991. Following completion of his neurosurgical training in 1986 at Sydney's Royal Prince Alfred Hospital and the Royal Alexandra Hospital for Children, Morgan undertook a Fellowship in Neurosurgery at the Mayo Clinic in Rochester, Minnesota, under the mentorship of Thoralf M. Sundt, Jr. Morgan was appointed Professor of Neurosurgery at the University of Sydney in 1998 and Chair of Neurosurgery at Royal North Shore Hospital until 2006. In 2006 he became the inaugural Dean of Medicine at Macquarie University. Morgan was Vice President of health and Medical Development Macquarie University between 2011 and 2015. As a cerebrovascular neurosurgeon in Sydney Morgan managed more than 4,000 intracranial aneurysms and 800 arteriovenous malformations (AVM) of the brain and spine.

== Honours ==
Morgan was inducted into the American Academy of Neurological Surgery in 1999. In 2012, Morgan was awarded an Honorary PhD (Neurosurgery) Universiti Kebangsaan Malaysia for service to UKM. In 2014, Morgan was the Goldwater Memorial Visiting Professor at Barrow Neurological Institute in Phoenix Arizona. In 2014, Morgan was awarded an Officer in the general division (AO) of the Order of Australia "For distinguished service to medicine as a neurovascular surgeon, researcher and educator, as an international leader and mentor, and to professional organisations."

== Notable publications ==
Morgan's most cited publications (> 100 citations each) are:

- Piepgras, D. G.; Morgan, M. K.; Sundt, T. M.; Yanagihara, T.; Mussman, L. M. (1988). "Intracerebral hemorrhage after carotid endarterectomy". Journal of Neurosurgery. 68 (4): 532–6. doi:10.3171/jns.1988.68.4.0532. PMID 3351580.
- Sekhon LH, Morgan MK, Sorby W, Grinnell V (August 1998). "Combined endovascular stent implantation and endosaccular coil placement for the treatment of a wide-necked vertebral artery aneurysm: technical case report". Neurosurgery. 43 (2): 380–3, discussion 384. doi:10.1097/00006123-199808000-00127. PMID 9696096.
- Johnston IH, Whittle IR, Besser M, Morgan MK (May 1987). "Vein of Galen malformation: diagnosis and management". Neurosurgery. 20 (5): 747–58. doi:10.1227/00006123-198705000-00013. PMID 3601022.
