= Murry Salby =

American atmospheric scientist

Murry Lewis Salby
- Education: Georgia Institute of Technology
- Known for: Atmospheric research
- Scientific career
- Fields: Atmospheric science
- Workplaces: University of Colorado Boulder; Macquarie University
- Thesis: Planetary waves in the upper atmosphere (1978)

Murry Lewis Salby was an American atmospheric scientist who focused on upper atmospheric wave propagation for most of his early career, and who later argued against aspects of the scientific consensus that human activity contributes to climate change. He has written two textbooks, Fundamentals of Atmospheric Physics (1996), and Physics of the Atmosphere and Climate (2011). The latter textbook, building on his first book, offers an overview of the processes controlling the atmosphere of Earth, weather, energy, and climate physics.

From the mid 1980s Salby conducted research at the University of Colorado Boulder. In 2005, the National Science Foundation opened an investigation into Salby's federal funding arrangements and found that he had displayed "a pattern of deception [and] a lack of integrity" in his handling of federal grant money. He resigned at Colorado in 2008 and became professor of climate risk at Macquarie University in Macquarie Park, New South Wales. In 2013 the university dismissed him on grounds of refusal to teach and misuse of university resources. He died in 2022.

== Education and career ==
Salby received his bachelor's degree in aerospace engineering in 1973 and his PhD in environmental dynamics in 1978 at the Georgia Institute of Technology. Salby focused on upper atmospheric wave propagation for most of his early career. He began as an assistant professor at the University of Colorado, Boulder in 1984. Salby then became an associate professor in 1985 and full professor in 1991, gaining tenure in 1997.

== Academic research ==
Salby was the first to document the influence of meteorological variability on long-term stratospheric ozone changes. This role of natural variability on stratospheric ozone depletion has inspired related studies and large research projects and has been recognised in several WMO Ozone Depletion Assessments.

== University of Colorado and National Science Foundation controversy ==
In 1994 Salby set up a non-profit company to receive federal award funds from the National Science Foundation and other agencies for research in parallel with his research work at the University of Colorado, and in 2003 he formed another company as a subcontractor to receive charges for his efforts. Following allegations of an overlap between funding applications, the National Science Foundation began an investigation in March 2005. It advised the University of Colorado, which sought information from Salby but he did not cooperate with this investigation. In October 2006 the university produced its investigation memo, and suspended Salby's privilege of submitting proposals from the university as well as restricting his access to university research facilities. In 2007, Salby was on sabbatical in Australia. Before the university made its final adjudication, Salby resigned from his faculty position. The National Science Foundation investigation report issued on 20 February 2009 found that Salby had overcharged his grants and violated financial conflict of interest policies, displaying "a pattern of deception, a lack of integrity, and a persistent and intentional disregard of NSF and University rules and policies" and a "consistent willingness to violate rules and regulations, whether federal or local, for his personal benefit." It debarred Salby from receiving federal assistance and benefits until 13 August 2012.

== Macquarie University controversy and court case ==
After leaving Colorado, Salby joined the faculty of Macquarie University in Australia, where he was appointed Professor of Climate Risk in 2008. In May 2011, Salby's research showing that ozone levels over Antarctica had begun to recover since the Montreal Protocol banned the use of ozone-depleting substances, was published in Geophysical Research Letters.

Macquarie terminated Salby's employment in 2013 after an extended period during which he repeatedly refused to fulfil his teaching responsibilities, and ultimately failed to turn up to take a scheduled class. Salby also ignored written instructions, made an unauthorised trip to Europe, and inappropriately used university resources including a corporate credit card. When this was discovered, the university cancelled his return ticket from Paris. Macquarie University stated that the dismissal was due to Salby's misconduct, and not "in any way related to his views on climate science".

In Salby v Macquarie University Justice Rolf Driver of the Federal Circuit Court of Australia ruled that Salby had failed to establish any of the elements of his case against Macquarie University regarding the termination of his employment and dismissed the case. Salby published a counterstatement.

== Bibliography ==
- Stratospheric Constituent Response to Vertically Propagating Equatorial Waves, Defense Technical Information Center, 1988.
- Fundamentals of Atmospheric Physics, Academic Press, 23 May 1996.
- Physics of the Atmosphere and Climate, Cambridge University Press, 16 January 2012. ISBN 978-1-139-16122-0.
