= Clive Williams (professor) =

British-born Australian Army Military Intelligence officer and academic

Clive Williams MG
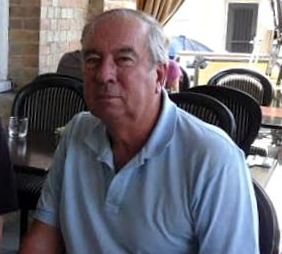
- Williams in 2013
- Born: Clive Owen Gestern Williams; 1 March 1945 (age 81); London England
- Education: MA Hons Criminology BA Hons
- Alma mater: University of Melbourne; King's College London
- Occupations: Academic, Visiting Professor, Military / Defence Intelligence, Lecturer, Author
- Military career
- Allegiance: Australia
- Branch: Australian Army
- Conflicts: Vietnam War
- Awards: Medal for Gallantry
- Website: Clive Williams

Clive Owen Gestern Williams, MG (born 1 March 1945) is a British-born former Australian Army Military Intelligence officer, and academic with research interests in terrorism and counterterrorism, politically motivated violence, insurgency and counterinsurgency.

== Career ==
=== Military ===
Williams was born in London but his early career was as an officer in Australian Military Intelligence, which included a number of overseas intelligence appointments. As a 2nd Lieutenant in the Australian Army Intelligence Corps (AUSTINT), he served with 1st Battalion Royal Australian Regiment in the Vietnam War between 1965 and 1966, and was awarded the Medal for Gallantry. He served in the Australian Army until 1981.

=== Civilian ===
==== Defence Intelligence ====
After leaving the Army, Williams pursued a civilian career in Australian Defence Intelligence, working mainly on transnational issues. He had a Chevening Scholarship at the War Studies Department, King's College London in 1987. His last Defence appointment was Director of Security Intelligence with responsibility for running high-level security investigations. He left Defence in 2002

=== Academic ===
Clive Williams has worked and lectured internationally on terrorism-related issues since 1980, and started running terrorism courses at the Australian National University (ANU) in 1996. Since leaving Defence in 2002, Williams has run terrorism and national security-related master's course electives at the ANU and a number of Australian and overseas universities. This included a master's course unit on Terrorism Law at the University of Sydney. He regularly conducts field work in his areas of research interest, including Afghanistan. He has been a visiting professor at the ANU College of Law's Centre for Military and Security Law since January 2012.

Clive Williams is also an adjunct professor / lecturer at Macquarie University Sydney Australia and a visiting professor at the University of New South Wales, Canberra

=== Career highlights ===
- Defence Intelligence Organisation (DIO) Attaché in Washington 1990-1993
- Head of Imagery Exploitation Centre 1993-1994
- Director Major Powers Section, DIO 1994-1998
- Director of Security Intelligence 1998-2002
- Associate of the International Academy of Investigative Psychology (AIAIP)

=== Professional associations ===
Dr. Clive Williams is a member of :

- The International Association of Bomb Technicians and Investigators (IABTI)
- The International Association of Chiefs of Police (IACP)
- The Australian Institute of Professional Intelligence Officers (AIPIO)
- ( An Associate of ) The International Academy of Investigative Psychology (IAIP).

== Publications ==
- "Australian security policy, post-11 September" in the Australian Journal of International Affairs, April 2002
- "Doctrine, Training and Combat with 1st Battalion The Royal Australian Regiment, 1965-66 in The Australian Army and the Vietnam War" Eds Peter Dennis and Jeffrey Grey, Army History Unit, 2002
- "The Sydney Olympics: The Trouble Free Games SDSC Working Paper No 371", November 2002
- "Australia’s Evolving Maritime Environment" in Protecting Australia’s Maritime Borders: The MV Tampa and Beyond Eds Martin Tsamenyi and Chris Rahman, University of Wollongong, 2002
- Countering Terror: New Directions Post "911" Eds Clive Williams and Brendan Taylor, Canberra Papers on Strategy and Defence No 147, 2003
- "The Question of Links Between Al Qaeda and Southeast Asia" in After Bali: The Threat of Terrorism in Southeast Asia Eds Kumar Ramakrishna and See Seng Tan Institute of Defence and Strategic Studies, Singapore, 2003
- "Unlawful Activities at Sea: An Australian Perspective" in The Strategic Importance of Seaborne Trade and Shipping Papers in Australian Maritime Affairs No 10, University of Wollongong, 2003
- "Islamic Extremism and Wahhabism" in Globalisation and the New Terror Ed David Martin Jones, Edward Elgar, 2004
- "Terrorism Explained", New Holland, 2004
- "Australia" in Terrorism in Southeast Asia Eds Wilson John and Swati Parashar, Observer Research Foundation, Longman, 2005
- 'Terrorism' in Strategy and Security in the Asia-Pacific Eds Robert Ayson and Desmond Ball, Allen & Unwin, 2006
