= List of Gogglebox Australia episodes =

Gogglebox Australia is an Australian reality/observational television series on Network Ten and The LifeStyle Channel that premiered on 11 February 2015. The series, which is a local adaptation of the British series of the same name, sees Australian families, couples and friends watching and commenting on a variety of television programs and movies. The series airs on subscription television channel Lifestyle first, and then airs on free-to-air network Network Ten a day later.

The fifteenth season premiered on Lifestyle on 9 March 2022, following the airing of a celebrity special on 2 March 2022.

== Series overview ==
Series	Episodes	Originally released	
Series	Episodes	First released	Last released
1	10	11 February 2015	15 April 2015
2	8	30 September 2015	18 November 2015
3	8	6 April 2016	25 May 2016
4	8	24 August 2016	12 October 2016
5	8	15 February 2017	5 April 2017
6	8	4 October 2017	22 November 2017
7	10	7 February 2018	11 April 2018
8	10	29 August 2018	31 October 2018
9	11	6 February 2019	17 April 2019
10	10	14 August 2019	16 October 2019
11	10	26 February 2020	29 April 2020
12	10	26 August 2020	28 October 2020
13	10	17 February 2021	21 April 2021
14	10	8 September 2021	10 November 2021
15	Special	2 March 2022	
15	9	9 March 2022	4 May 2022
16	10	24 August 2022	26 October 2022
17	10	22 February 2023	26 April 2023
18	10	16 August 2023	18 October 2023
18	Special	25 October 2023	
19	10	21 February 2024	24 April 2024
20	10	14 August 2024	16 October 2024
21	10	20 February 2025	24 April 2025
22	10	28 August 2025	30 October 2025
22	Special	2 November 2025	
23	10	19 February 2026	23 April 2026
23	Special	30 April 2026	
24	10	23 August 2026	25 October 2026

== Episodes ==
=== Season 1 (2015) ===
No. overall	Episode	Original release date	Aus. viewers
1	Episode 1	11 February 2015 (LS)	146,000
1	Episode 1	12 February 2015 (Ten)	495,000
Shows featured: My Kitchen Rules, One Born Every Minute, Sky News and Studio 10 reports on the Liberal leadership crisis, I'm a Celebrity...Get Me Out of Here!, Dance Moms, Dinner with Lions, 60 Minutes story on the Sydney siege, Selling Houses Australia and Shark Tank.
2	Episode 2	18 February 2015 (LS)	107,000
2	Episode 2	19 February 2015 (Ten)	438,000
Shows featured: Family Feud, Fashion Police, 9News report on the Cricket World Cup, My Kitchen Rules, David Attenborough's Animal Attraction, Mamma Mia!, Outback ER, My Strange Addiction and Four Corners Bali 9 Special.
3	Episode 3	25 February 2015 (LS)	107,000
3	Episode 3	26 February 2015 (Ten)	493,000
Shows featured: The Real Housewives of Melbourne, Shark Tank, Four Corners Greyhound Racing Special, Downton Abbey, Top Gun and I'm a Celebrity...Get Me Out of Here!.
4	Episode 4	4 March 2015 (LS)	116,000
4	Episode 4	5 March 2015 (Ten)	503,000
Shows featured: The Sound of Music, The Block, Sky News story on the BRIT Awards, Embarrassing Bodies Down Under, SBS World News report on the NRL drug scandal, Life Below Zero, My France with Manu, My Kitchen Rules, The Graham Norton Show and Stephen Fry: Out There.
5	Episode 5	11 March 2015 (LS)	120,000
5	Episode 5	12 March 2015 (Ten)	445,000
Shows featured: The Real Housewives of Melbourne, Heston's Fantastical Food, SBS World News Eurovision news telecast, Survivor: Worlds Apart, The Undateables, Reinventing the Royals, The Big Bang Theory, Extreme Cheapskates and Dateline MH370 special.
6	Episode 6	18 March 2015 (LS)	140,000
6	Episode 6	19 March 2015 (Ten)	376,000
Shows featured: Neighbours 30th year anniversary special, Adam Zkt. Eva (Adam Looking for Eve), SBS World News report on Pete Evans's paleo cookbook for children, The Walking Dead, Insight's story on dogs' emotions, I'm a Celebrity...Get Me Out of Here! Australia finale, Jaws, Top Gear and Millionaire Hot Seat.
7	Episode 7	25 March 2015 (LS)	131,000
7	Episode 7	26 March 2015 (Ten)	381,000
Shows featured: Keeping Up with the Kardashians, Antiques Roadshow, Easter with the Australian Women's Weekly, Titanic, Selling Houses Australia, 60 Minutes story on Jake Bilardi, Bondi Rescue and My Kitchen Rules.
8	Episode 8	1 April 2015 (LS)	138,000
8	Episode 8	2 April 2015 (Ten)	471,000
Shows featured: Gold Coast Cops, Gardening Australia, Ten Eyewitness News story on Zayn Malik leaving One Direction, Million Dollar Minute, Hell's Kitchen, 2015 Cricket World Cup Final, Forrest Gump, The Footy Show and RuPaul's Drag Race.
9	Episode 9	8 April 2015 (LS)	150,000
9	Episode 9	9 April 2015 (Ten)	518,000
Shows featured: Holiday Report with Tom Williams, Stop Laughing...This Is Serious, The Amazing Race U.S., The Truth about Meat, The Wizard of Oz, Cyberbully, Comedy Central Roast of Justin Bieber and Tattoo Tales.
10	Episode 10	15 April 2015 (LS)	134,000
10	Episode 10	16 April 2015 (Ten)	594,000
Shows featured: The Real Housewives of Melbourne, Extreme Births, Nine News coverage of Richie Benaud's death, My Kitchen Rules, Game of Thrones, Bondi Vet, Dateline story on organ trafficking in China, Insight story on siblings and Duck Dynasty.

=== Season 2 (2015) ===
No. overall	Episode	Original release date	Aus. viewers
11	Episode 1	30 September 2015 (LS)	145,000
11	Episode 1	1 October 2015 (Ten)	563,000
Shows featured: The Bachelorette Australia, The Celebrity Apprentice Australia, World's Biggest Pets, Australian Story, Nigella Feasts, The X Factor Australia, RBT and Gruen.
12	Episode 2	7 October 2015 (LS)	138,000
12	Episode 2	8 October 2015 (Ten)	559,000
Shows featured: The Block, Doctor Who, The X Factor Australia, TBL Families, AFL Grand Final 2015, Tattoo Fixers, The Project, Catalyst and Dirty Dancing.
13	Episode 3	14 October 2015 (LS)	130,000
13	Episode 3	15 October 2015 (Ten)	674,000
Shows featured: How Not to Behave, The Bachelorette Australia, The Verdict, When Harry Met Sally..., The Secret World of Lego, Australian Story, The Chase Australia and The Great Australian Bake Off.
14	Episode 4	21 October 2015 (LS)	127,000
14	Episode 4	22 October 2015 (Ten)	720,000
Shows featured: A Current Affair, Beach Cops, Mesmerised, House Husbands, River Cottage Australia, Ka-ching: Pokie Nation, Back in Time for Dinner, Kitchen Nightmares and Gruen.
15	Episode 5	28 October 2015 (LS)	147,000
15	Episode 5	29 October 2015 (Ten)	565,000
Shows featured: The Bachelorette Australia, What Really Happens in Thailand, Family Feud, Crocodile Dundee, Border Security, TBL Families, SBS News and Geordie Shore.
16	Episode 6	4 November 2015 (LS)	121,000
16	Episode 6	5 November 2015 (Ten)	682,000
Shows featured: The Block, Age Gap Love, The Living Room, A Place to Call Home, How Not to Behave, The Project, ABC News and The Empire Strikes Back.
17	Episode 7	11 November 2015 (LS)	141,000
17	Episode 7	12 November 2015 (Ten)	631,000
Shows featured: The X Factor Australia, RBT, The Great Australian Bake Off, Don't Tell the Bride, Kitchen Cabinet, Bondi Vet, Sunday Night and Catalyst.
18	Episode 8	18 November 2015 (LS)	131,000
18	Episode 8	19 November 2015 (Ten)	643,000
Shows featured: TBL Families, A Current Affair, Mary: The Making of a Princess, Bargain Hunt, ABC News, MythBusters, Born in the Wrong Body and Grease.

=== Season 3 (2016) ===
No. overall	Episode	Original release date	Aus. viewers
19	Episode 1	6 April 2016 (LS)	181,000
19	Episode 1	7 April 2016 (Ten)	629,000
Shows featured: You're Back in the Room, All Star Family Feud, My Kitchen Rules, Pretty Woman, Reno Rumble, Keeping Australia Alive, The Secret Life of 6 Year Olds and Territory Cops.
20	Episode 2	13 April 2016 (LS)	169,000
20	Episode 2	14 April 2016 (Ten)	590,000
Shows featured: Married at First Sight Australia, Luke Warm Sex, American Idol, AFL Footy Show, Long Lost Family Australia, The Story of God with Morgan Freeman, Insight and I Am Cait.
21	Episode 3	20 April 2016 (LS)	177,000
21	Episode 3	21 April 2016 (Ten)	534,000
Shows featured: The Real Housewives of Melbourne, Bondi Rescue, My France with Manu, The Project's 60 Minutes Lebanon Scandal Coverage, The Great Pottery Throw Down, Downton Abbey, Indian Wedding Race, Beauty & the Beach and Catfish
22	Episode 4	27 April 2016 (LS)	187,000
22	Episode 4	28 April 2016 (Ten)	548,000
Shows featured: My Kitchen Rules, Sky News Australia Coverage on Prince's Death, The Weekly with Charlie Pickering, Married at First Sight Australia, The Project's 60 Minutes Lebanon Scandal Coverage, 60 Minutes story on, Game of Thrones, Australian Story on Michelle Bridges, Rachel Hunter's Tour of Beauty and Gallipoli.
23	Episode 5	4 May 2016 (LS)	185,000
23	Episode 5	5 May 2016 (Ten)	728,000
Shows featured: The Voice, My Kitchen Rules Grand Final, Married at First Sight Australia, Kebab Kings, MasterChef Australia, Keeping Australia Alive, Selling Houses Australia and The Bodyguard.
24	Episode 6	11 May 2016 (LS)	201,000
24	Episode 6	12 May 2016 (Ten)	523,000
Shows featured: Home and Away, A Current Affair, Seven Year Switch, The Voice, Keeping Up with the Kardashians, Family Feud, My Crazy Obsession, Shark Tank and Logie Awards of 2016.
25	Episode 7	18 May 2016 (LS)	203,000
25	Episode 7	19 May 2016 (Ten)	582,000
Shows featured: House Rules, Is Your Brain Male or Female, The Real Housewives of Melbourne, Q&A, MasterChef Australia, Wentworth, The Tiny Tots Talent Agency and Eurovision.
26	Episode 8	25 May 2016 (LS)	222,000
26	Episode 8	26 May 2016 (Ten)	530,000
Shows featured: Kiss Bang Love, The Voice, Seven Year Switch, 60 Days In, The Project story on milk production, The Queen's 90th Birthday Celebrations, Judge Judy and The Feed.

=== Season 4 (2016) ===
No. overall	Episode	Original release date	Aus. viewers
27	Episode 1	24 August 2016 (LS)	238,000
27	Episode 1	25 August 2016 (Ten)	569,000
Shows featured: The Bachelor Australia, coverage of the 2016 Summer Olympics, 20 to One, Australian Survivor, Gruen's story on the Census, A Current Affair's story on Indonesia's proposed alcohol ban in Bali, The Great Australian Spelling Bee and Beaches.
28	Episode 2	31 August 2016 (LS)	189,000
28	Episode 2	1 September 2016 (Ten)	619,000
Shows featured: Australia's Cheapest Weddings, Anh's Brush with Fame, The Block, Offspring, Zumbo's Just Desserts, You Can't Ask That, The Recruit and Four Corners story on the Middle Eastern refugee crisis.
29	Episode 3	7 September 2016 (LS)	232,000
29	Episode 3	8 September 2016 (Ten)	570,000
Shows featured: Married at First Sight Australia, The Big Music Quiz, Willy Wonka & the Chocolate Factory, Australian Survivor, Feeding the Super Rich, The Feed's story on teen bullying, Millionaire Hot Seat and Stranger on the Bridge.
30	Episode 4	14 September 2016 (LS)	181,000
30	Episode 4	15 September 2016 (Ten)	730,000
Shows featured: Married at First Sight Australia, Border Security: Australia's Front Line, The Bachelor Australia, RBT, 800 Words, Call Me Dad, The Living Room and Anh's Brush with Fame.
31	Episode 5	21 September 2016 (LS)	242,000
31	Episode 5	22 September 2016 (Ten)	705,000
Shows featured: The Bachelor Australia, The Project, Australia's Next Top Model, Catalyst, Doctor Doctor, Kings Cross ER: St Vincent's Hospital, The Chase Australia and Why Are We Getting So Fat?
32	Episode 6	28 September 2016 (LS)	234,000
32	Episode 6	29 September 2016 (Ten)	670,000
Shows featured: The Block, Find My First Love, The Bachelorette Australia, Insight's story on older parents, Better Homes and Gardens, The Case Of: JonBenet Ramsey, Thelma & Louise and Who Do You Think You Are? story on Peter Garrett.
33	Episode 7	5 October 2016 (LS)	202,000
33	Episode 7	6 October 2016 (Ten)	690,000
Shows featured: Australian Survivor, I Own Australia's Best Home, 7.30 story on the U.S. Election, The Brownlow Medal, The AFL Footy Show, The AFL Grand Final, The Wrong Girl, Highway Patrol, Conviction, Aussie Gold Hunters and Zumbo's Just Desserts.
34	Episode 8	12 October 2016 (LS)	231,000
34	Episode 8	13 October 2016 (Ten)	714,000
Shows featured: The X Factor, The Great Australian Bake Off, Todd Sampson's Body Hack, Hyde & Seek, The Bolt Report, If You Are The One, 60 Days In, Airbnb: Dream or Nightmare and The Secret Daughter.

=== Season 5 (2017) ===
No. overall	Episode	Original release date	Aus. viewers
35	Episode 1	15 February 2017 (LS)	152,000
35	Episode 1	16 February 2017 (Ten)	725,000
Shows featured: Married at First Sight Australia, Media Watch coverage of fake news, I'm a Celebrity...Get Me Out of Here!, Heston's Recipe for Romance, This Is Us, My Kitchen Rules, Ice Wars, Bride & Prejudice and Boy to Man.
36	Episode 2	22 February 2017 (LS)	184,000
36	Episode 2	23 February 2017 (Ten)	752,000
Shows featured: Travel Guides, I'm a Celebrity...Get Me Out of Here!, Undressed, Four Corners story on the Australian vitamin industry, The Secret Life of Brothers & Sisters, The New Celebrity Apprentice, Murder Uncovered, Hoges and Gok's Chinese Takeaway.
37	Episode 3	1 March 2017 (LS)	183,000
37	Episode 3	2 March 2017 (Ten)	714,000
Shows featured: The Real Housewives of Sydney, Married at First Sight Australia, Bride & Prejudice, The Living Room, A Current Affair story on the Centrelink cashless debit card, Is Australia Racist?, Big Little Lies and Hugh's War on Waste.
38	Episode 4	8 March 2017 (LS)	172,000
38	Episode 4	9 March 2017 (Ten)	771,000
Shows featured: My Kitchen Rules, The Weekly with Charlie Pickering, Dance Moms, My Year 12 Life, Bull, Selling Houses Australia, The Adventures of Priscilla, Queen of the Desert, Pointless and Dating Naked.
39	Episode 5	15 March 2017 (LS)	184,000
39	Episode 5	16 March 2017 (Ten)	674,000
Shows featured: The Real Housewives of Sydney, The Project, Hotel Hell, I'm a Celebrity...Get Me Out of Here!, Chris Humfrey's Animal Instinct, The Biggest Loser, Fatal Attraction, Too Posh to Parent and Trust Me, I'm a Doctor.
40	Episode 6	22 March 2017 (LS)	215,000
40	Episode 6	23 March 2017 (Ten)	722,000
Shows featured: Married at First Sight Australia, Jamie & Jimmy's Food Fight Club, Travel Guides, Planet Earth II, Highway Patrol, Demolition Man, Botched, Undercover Boss and Australian Story.
41	Episode 7	29 March 2017 (LS)	214,000
41	Episode 7	30 March 2017 (Ten)	687,000
Shows featured: Neighbours, Sunday Night interview with Pete Evans, The Cook Who Changed Our Lives, Millionaire Hot Seat, Bondi Rescue, The Real Housewives of Sydney, The Project story on filmed sexual assault at a Sydney high school, Todd Sampson's Life on the Line and Keeping Up with the Kardashians.
42	Episode 8	5 April 2017 (LS)	197,000
42	Episode 8	6 April 2017 (Ten)	634,000
Shows featured: My Kitchen Rules, The Feed, Planet Earth II, Married at First Sight Australia, The Graham Norton Show, Wentworth, 24 Hours in A&E, The Ballroom Boys and E.T. the Extra-Terrestrial.

=== Season 6 (2017) ===
No. overall	Episode	Original release date	Aus. viewers
43	Episode 1	4 October 2017 (LS)	151,000
43	Episode 1	5 October 2017 (Ten)	824,000
Shows featured: The Bachelorette Australia, 2017 AFL Grand Final, 2017 NRL Grand Final, Cannonball, First Dates, Australian Survivor, A Current Affair story on Hugh Hefner’s death, Look Me In The Eye, Hard Quiz and Love It or List It Australia.
44	Episode 2	11 October 2017 (LS)	141,000
44	Episode 2	12 October 2017 (Ten)	826,000
Shows featured: The Block, Gruen, Border Security, The Graham Norton Show, Rick Stein's Spain, Little Big Shots, Micro Monsters, The Archibald and Court Justice: Sydney.
45	Episode 3	18 October 2017 (LS)	157,000
45	Episode 3	19 October 2017 (Ten)	777,000
Shows featured: Australian Survivor, The Bachelorette Australia, RBT, Housemates, Food Safari Earth, Antiques Roadshow, Get Krack!n, Insight, Project Runway and The Greeks.
46	Episode 4	25 October 2017 (LS)	165,000
46	Episode 4	26 October 2017 (Ten)	952,000
Shows featured: The Block, Lawless: The Real Bushrangers, Michael Hutchence: The Last Rockstar, The Grand Tour, A Current Affair story on phone scammers, The Millionaire Matchmaker, All Star Family Feud, Ink Master: Revenge and The Living Room.
47	Episode 5	1 November 2017 (LS)	203,000
47	Episode 5	2 November 2017 (Ten)	618,000
Shows featured: The Block finale, Family Food Fight, The Bachelorette Australia finale, The Project's story on the parliamentary eligibility crisis, The Secret Life of Queen Victoria, Sisters, Q&A same-sex marriage debate, The Wall and The Story of Us with Morgan Freeman.
48	Episode 6	8 November 2017 (LS)	184,000
48	Episode 6	9 November 2017 (Ten)	588,000
Shows featured: First Dates, RBT, The Good Doctor, The Sixth Sense, Vet on the Hill, CRAM!, Apex Gang: Behind the Headlines, The Great British Bake Off and 24 Hours in A&E.
49	Episode 7	15 November 2017 (LS)	177,000
49	Episode 7	16 November 2017 (Ten)	602,000
Shows featured: The Secret Daughter, Territory Cops, Instant Hotel, Gruen, Africa, Love It or List It Australia, The Mosque Next Door, The Graham Norton Show and Braveheart.
50	Episode 8	22 November 2017 (LS)	193,000
50	Episode 8	23 November 2017 (Ten)	562,000
Shows featured: Instant Hotel, The Project's story on the result of the Australian Marriage Law Postal Survey, Fox Sports coverage of Socceroos v Honduras, Countdown to Life: The Extraordinary Making of You, The Wall, Sunday Night's story on Prince Harry and Meghan Markle, Family Food Fight, The Surgeon and The Soldier, Catfish: The TV Show and Love Actually.

=== Season 7 (2018) ===
No. overall	Episode	Original release date	Aus. viewers
51	Episode 1	7 February 2018 (LS)	150,000
51	Episode 1	8 February 2018 (Ten)	714,000
Shows featured: My Kitchen Rules, Hughesy, We Have a Problem, I'm a Celebrity...Get Me Out of Here!, No More Boys and Girls: Can Our Kids Go Gender Free?, Married at First Sight Australia, The Sunday Project, Home and Away and The Checkout.
52	Episode 2	14 February 2018 (LS)	116,000
52	Episode 2	15 February 2018 (Ten)	649,000
Shows featured: The Real Housewives of Melbourne, A Current Affair, I'm a Celebrity...Get Me Out of Here!, Travel Guides, Australian Story, The Front Bar: Winter Edition, Human Planet, Grand Designs Australia and Neighbours.
53	Episode 3	21 February 2018 (LS)	132,000
53	Episode 3	22 February 2018 (Ten)	629,000
Shows featured: Married at First Sight Australia, The Project, My Kitchen Rules, Blue Planet II, Running Wild with Bear Grylls, Hawke: The Larrikin and the Leader, 24 Hours in Emergency, Dogs: The Untold Story and Underbelly Files: Chopper.
54	Episode 4	28 February 2018 (LS)	123,000
54	Episode 4	1 March 2018 (Ten)	692,000
Shows featured: Australian Spartan, I'm a Celebrity...Get Me Out of Here!, Riot, One Born Every Minute, Married at First Sight Australia, Date Night, Muslims Like Us, Rick Stein's Road to Mexico and Think Tank.
55	Episode 5	7 March 2018 (LS)	124,000
55	Episode 5	8 March 2018 (Ten)	602,000
Shows featured: My Kitchen Rules, Australia's Cheapest Weddings, The Late Late Show with James Corden, Australian Story, Project Runway All Stars, Hannah Gadsby's Nakedy Nudes, 60 Minutes, Hotel Hell and Ghost.
56	Episode 6	14 March 2018 (LS)	181,000
56	Episode 6	15 March 2018 (Ten)	554,000
Shows featured: I'm a Celebrity...Get Me Out of Here! finale, Married at First Sight Australia, The Project's story on International Women's Day, Manu's American Road Trip, Bondi Rescue, Selling Houses Australia, Travel Guides, 999: What's Your Emergency?, Safe Harbour and Jane.
57	Episode 7	21 March 2018 (LS)	147,000
57	Episode 7	22 March 2018 (Ten)	610,000
Shows featured: Married at First Sight Australia, Hughesy, We Have a Problem, American Idol, The Secret Life of 4 Year Olds, Hard Quiz, The Graham Norton Show, Four Corners, SBS World News coverage of Stephen Hawking's death, The Project's report on Nick Cummins being the new Bachelor and Muriel's Wedding.
58	Episode 8	28 March 2018 (LS)	174,000
58	Episode 8	29 March 2018 (Ten)	469,000
Shows featured: Bachelor in Paradise Australia, Blue Planet II, My Kitchen Rules, Sando, The Great Australian Bake Off, Dr. Jeff: Rocky Mountain Vet, Wasted! The Story of Food Waste, Show Me the Movie! and Britannia.
59	Episode 9	4 April 2018 (LS)	165,000
59	Episode 9	5 April 2018 (Ten)	561,000
Shows featured: Bachelor in Paradise Australia, The Project and Sky News coverage of the cricket ball-tampering scandal, Selling Houses Australia, Tonya Harding: The Price of Gold, Antiques Roadshow, The Living Room, Undercover High, The Chase Australia and The Millionaire Matchmaker.
60	Episode 10	11 April 2018 (LS)	171,000
60	Episode 10	12 April 2018 (Ten)	533,000
Shows featured: Bachelor in Paradise Australia, Body Fixers, Employable Me, Food Safari Fire, RBT, He Named Me Malala, Back to the Future and 24 Hours in Emergency.

=== Season 8 (2018) ===
No. overall	Episode	Original release date	Aus. viewers
61	Episode 1	29 August 2018 (LS)	194,000
61	Episode 1	30 August 2018 (Ten)	806,000
Shows featured: Australian Survivor: Champions vs. Contenders, ABC News and Sky News coverage of the Liberal Party of Australia leadership spills, The Block, The Bachelor Australia, Who Is America?, You Can't Ask That, Dance Boss, Bite Club and Rock Legends: Aretha Franklin.
62	Episode 2	5 September 2018 (LS)	174,000
62	Episode 2	6 September 2018 (Ten)	774,000
Shows featured: Take Me Out, The Weekly with Charlie Pickering, Gardening Australia, The Bachelor Australia, Nigel Slater's Middle East, Pointless, Robin Williams: Come Inside My Mind, Little Big Shots and Australian Story.
63	Episode 3	12 September 2018 (LS)	207,000
63	Episode 3	13 September 2018 (Ten)	825,000
Shows featured: Australian Survivor: Champions vs. Contenders, The Project's story on the death of Burt Reynolds, Great Continental Railway Journeys, Take Me Out, Neighbours, True Story with Hamish & Andy, The Block, The Pacific: In the Wake of Captain Cook with Sam Neill and Russell Coight's All Aussie Adventures.
64	Episode 4	19 September 2018 (LS)	221,000
64	Episode 4	20 September 2018 (Ten)	735,000
Shows featured: The Bachelor Australia, SBS World News and ABC News coverage of Serena Williams at the US Open, Inside the Factory, Australian Survivor: Champions vs. Contenders, Sunday Night's story on Olivia Newton-John, Magic for Humans, Speed, Insight and Days That Shaped America: 9/11.
65	Episode 5	26 September 2018 (LS)	204,000
65	Episode 5	27 September 2018 (Ten)	615,000
Shows featured: The Bachelor Australia, The Footy Show, The Block, Hard Quiz, Sunday Night, Carpool Karaoke: When Corden Met McCartney Live From Liverpool, Playing for Keeps, Alone: Redemption and Four Corners.
66	Episode 6	3 October 2018 (LS)	184,000
66	Episode 6	4 October 2018 (Ten)	813,000
Shows featured: Love It or List It Australia, 2018 AFL Grand Final and 2018 NRL Grand Final, Take Me Out, The Chefs' Line, Cruising with Jane McDonald, Australian Survivor: Champions vs. Contenders, America's Next Top Model, Gordon Ramsay's 24 Hours to Hell and Back and Footloose.
67	Episode 7	10 October 2018 (LS)	175,000
67	Episode 7	11 October 2018 (Ten)	677,000
Shows featured: The Bachelor Australia, 60 Minutes, All Together Now, Bake Off: The Professionals, Game of Games, Highway Patrol, Go Back to Where You Came From Live, Boy to Man and Jimmy Barnes: Working Class Boy.
68	Episode 8	17 October 2018 (LS)	174,000
68	Episode 8	18 October 2018 (Ten)	729,000
Shows featured: Australian Survivor: Champions vs. Contenders, Seven News coverage of the wedding of Princess Eugenie and Jack Brooksbank, Attenborough: Wild Mothers and Babies, The Bachelorette Australia, Manifest, Joanna Lumley's Silk Road Adventure, Insight, Inside the Factory and Ambulance Australia.
69	Episode 9	24 October 2018 (LS)	190,000
69	Episode 9	25 October 2018 (Ten)	745,000
Shows featured: The Block, ABC News and The Project's coverage of Prince Harry and Meghan's Australian tour, Blind Date, One Born Every Minute, Rick Stein's Taste of Shanghai, Queer Eye, Australian Story, ABC coverage of the 2018 Invictus Games opening ceremony, Extreme Cheapskates and The Silence of the Lambs.
70	Episode 10	31 October 2018 (LS)	189,000
70	Episode 10	1 November 2018 (Ten)	724,000
Shows featured: The Block, Bride & Prejudice, Family Food Fight, The Bachelorette Australia, Antiques Roadshow, Driving Test, Sacrifice, Vet Gone Wild and 24 Hours in A&E.

=== Season 9 (2019) ===
No. overall	Episode	Original release date	Aus. viewers
71	Episode 1	6 February 2019 (LS)	139,000
71	Episode 1	7 February 2019 (Ten)	715,000
Shows featured: Married at First Sight, The Project, My Kitchen Rules, Tidying Up with Marie Kondo, The Secret Life of 4 and 5 Year Olds, The Family Law, Aftermath: Beyond Black Saturday, Hughesy, We Have a Problem and The Indian Pacific: Australia's Longest Train Journey.
72	Episode 2	13 February 2019 (LS)	120,000
72	Episode 2	14 February 2019 (Ten)	565,000
Shows featured: Married at First Sight, The Great British Bake Off, Escape from the City, Operation: Live, America's Got Talent: The Champions, Ed Stafford: First Man Out, Magical Land of Oz, Show Me the Movie! and Dr. Pimple Popper.
73	Episode 3	20 February 2019 (LS)	136,000
73	Episode 3	21 February 2019 (Ten)	650,000
Shows featured: I'm a Celebrity...Get Me Out of Here! finale, The Project, Travel Guides, My Kitchen Rules, Changing Rooms, The Real Housewives of Beverly Hills, Sinkholes: Deadly Drops, Instant Hotel and Honey Badgers: Masters of Mayhem.
74	Episode 4	27 February 2019 (LS)	144,000
74	Episode 4	28 February 2019 (Ten)	647,000
Shows featured: Dancing with the Stars, John Torode's Middle East, Married at First Sight, Chris & Julia's Sunday Night Takeaway, Better Homes and Gardens, Bad Mothers, The Secret Life of the Zoo, Secrets of the Chocolate Factory: Inside Cadbury and Inside Birmingham Children's Hospital.
75	Episode 5	6 March 2019 (LS)	133,000
75	Episode 5	7 March 2019 (Ten)	646,000
Shows featured: Instant Hotel, A Current Affair, Married at First Sight, Project Runway All Stars, Ambulance Australia, My Kitchen Rules, Dynasties, The Feed and My Best Friend's Wedding.
76	Episode 6	13 March 2019 (LS)	142,000
76	Episode 6	14 March 2019 (Ten)	645,000
Shows featured: Dancing with the Stars, SBS World News coverage of International Women's Day, Mexican Dynasties, American Idol, Highway Patrol, Selling Houses Australia, Botched, The Vet Life and Leaving Neverland.
77	Episode 7	20 March 2019 (LS)	123,000
77	Episode 7	21 March 2019 (Ten)	567,000
Shows featured: Married at First Sight, Skin Wars, ABC News coverage of the Christchurch mosque shootings, Hughesy, We Have a Problem, Where the Wild Men Are, Dirty John, Australian Story, Julius Caesar Revealed and Bondi Rescue.
78	Episode 8	27 March 2019 (LS)	165,000
78	Episode 8	28 March 2019 (Ten)	584,000
Shows featured: Dancing with the Stars, The Project, Married at First Sight, Paul Hollywood's Pies and Puds, Travel Guides, My Kitchen Rules, The Weekly with Charlie Pickering, Finding My Twin Stranger and Louis Theroux: Dark States.
79	Episode 9	3 April 2019 (LS)	184,000
79	Episode 9	4 April 2019 (Ten)	579,000
Shows featured: American Idol, The Project, First Dates, 4 Men, 175 Babies: Britain's Super Sperm Donors, Selling Houses Australia, Inside Nature's Giants, Australia in Colour, Antiques Roadshow and The Blues Brothers.
80	Episode 10	10 April 2019 (LS)	177,000
80	Episode 10	11 April 2019 (Ten)	537,000
Shows featured: Married at First Sight, Dancing with the Stars, Bachelor in Paradise Australia, One Born Every Minute, Employable Me, Christians Like Us, Dr. K's Exotic Animal ER and After Life.
81	Episode 11	17 April 2019 (LS)	219,000
81	Episode 11	18 April 2019 (Ten)	437,000
Shows featured: Game of Thrones, Thrones 360, Our Planet, Bachelor in Paradise Australia, You Can't Ask That, Hughesy, We Have a Problem, The Secret Life of Kids, Gordon, Gino and Fred's Road Trip and The Recording Studio.

=== Season 10 (2019) ===
No. overall	Episode	Original release date	Aus. viewers
82	Episode 1	14 August 2019 (LS)	184,000
82	Episode 1	15 August 2019 (Ten)	704,000
Shows featured: The Bachelor Australia, SeaChange, Australia's Got Talent, Australian Survivor, Hard Quiz, Gordon Ramsay: Uncharted, Anh's Brush with Fame, Love Me as I Am and This Time Next Year.
83	Episode 2	21 August 2019 (LS)	205,000
83	Episode 2	22 August 2019 (Ten)	669,000
Shows featured: The Block, The Project, Dogs Behaving (Very) Badly, The Bachelor Australia, Grand Designs Australia, Medicine or Myth?, Live PD: Police Patrol, Blown Away and Miriam's Deathly Adventure.
84	Episode 3	28 August 2019 (LS)	168,000
84	Episode 3	29 August 2019 (Ten)	804,000
Shows featured: The Proposal, Richard Hammond's Miracles of Nature, Australian Survivor, Superfoods: The Real Story, Old People's Home for 4 Year Olds, Saturday Night Rove, Emma Willis: Delivering Babies, This Time Next Year and The Chase Australia.
85	Episode 4	4 September 2019 (LS)	170,000
85	Episode 4	5 September 2019 (Ten)	607,000
Shows featured: Australian Survivor, New Dads, The Bachelor Australia, Legends of the Lost with Megan Fox, Judi Dench's Wild Borneo Adventure, Better Homes and Gardens, 60 Minutes, Extreme Engagement and Bohemian Rhapsody.
86	Episode 5	11 September 2019 (LS)	168,000
86	Episode 5	12 September 2019 (Ten)	626,000
Shows featured: The Block, Sydney's Crazy Rich Asians, Antiques Roadshow, Hyperdrive, Out There with Jack Randall, Say Yes to the Dress, Australian Story, Myth or Science: The Power of Poo and Highway Patrol.
87	Episode 6	18 September 2019 (LS)	156,000
87	Episode 6	19 September 2019 (Ten)	759,000
Shows featured: The Bachelor Australia, Sweet Home Sextuplets, I Am... Roxy!, Let's Talk About Sex, Life, My 80 Year Old Flatmate, Sunday Night, The Butcher and 24 Hours in A&E.
88	Episode 7	25 September 2019 (LS)	161,000
88	Episode 7	26 September 2019 (Ten)	558,000
Shows featured: The Bachelor Australia, Meet the Orangutans, Australia's Got Talent, Australian Survivor, Old People's Home for 4 Year Olds, Pawn Stars, The Pool, RBT and The Titan Games.
89	Episode 8	2 October 2019 (LS)	155,000
89	Episode 8	3 October 2019 (Ten)	556,000
Shows featured: The Masked Singer Australia, 2019 AFL Grand Final, Gino's Italian Escape, Gruen, The All New Monty: Ladies' Night, Bondi Rescue, The Feed, Skin Wars and Aussie Inventions That Changed the World.
90	Episode 9	9 October 2019 (LS)	136,000
90	Episode 9	10 October 2019 (Ten)	704,000
Shows featured: Bride & Prejudice, 2019 NRL Grand Final, Love It or List It, The Real Dirty Dancing, Vet on the Hill, The Great Australian Bake Off, Paramedics, Celebrity Name Game and How Australia Got Its Mojo.
91	Episode 10	16 October 2019 (LS)	148,000
91	Episode 10	17 October 2019 (Ten)	794,000
Shows featured: Love Island Australia, Japan: Earth's Enchanted Islands, The Bachelorette, The Masked Singer, Julia Zemiro's Home Delivery, The Block, In a Man's World, Struggle Street and One Born Every Minute.

=== Season 11 (2020) ===
No. overall	Episode	Original release date	Aus. viewers
92	Episode 1	26 February 2020 (LS)	163,000
92	Episode 1	27 February 2020 (Ten)	685,000
Shows featured: Married at First Sight, 7.30, Australian Survivor: All Stars, Kings of Pain, My Kitchen Rules, Griff's Great Australian Rail Trip, Dancing with the Stars, Extreme Cake Makers and Stacey Dooley Sleeps Over.
93	Episode 2	4 March 2020 (LS)	156,000
93	Episode 2	5 March 2020 (Ten)	645,000
Shows featured: Pooch Perfect, ABC report on Holden's closure, Married at First Sight, Rick Stein's Secret France, Hughesy, We Have a Problem, First Dates, Wrongly Released: Free to Kill, Making It, SBS World News coverage of Mardi Gras and Kylie's Secret Night.
94	Episode 3	11 March 2020 (LS)	139,000
94	Episode 3	12 March 2020 (Ten)	611,000
Shows featured: Australian Survivor: All Stars, The Project, Shahs of Sunset, Meet the Sloths, Love on the Spectrum, Botched, Ambulance Australia, 60 Minutes and Love Is Blind.
95	Episode 4	18 March 2020 (LS)	147,000
95	Episode 4	19 March 2020 (Ten)	604,000
Shows featured: Married at First Sight, A Current Affair and SBS World News reports on the coronavirus pandemic, My Kitchen Rules, Dr. Pimple Popper, Australian Story, Great Australian Railway Journeys, Dancing with the Stars, Tom Kerridge's American Feast and Billy Connolly's Big Send Off.
96	Episode 5	25 March 2020 (LS)	187,000
96	Episode 5	26 March 2020 (Ten)	736,000
Shows featured: Neighbours, Q&A, Sky News, ABC News and SBS World News coverage of the coronavirus pandemic, ABC News coverage of the death of Kenny Rogers, 100 Humans, Australian Survivor: All Stars, Bear: Koala Hero, Married at First Sight, Border Security: Australia's Front Line, Treehouse Masters and Rocketman.
97	Episode 6	1 April 2020 (LS)	216,000
97	Episode 6	2 April 2020 (Ten)	787,000
Shows featured: My Kitchen Rules, Seven News, Spy in the Wild, Love on the Spectrum, Dancing with the Stars, The Moaning of Life, Bondi Rescue, Selling Houses Australia, Keeping Up with the Kardashians and You Can't Ask That.
98	Episode 7	8 April 2020 (LS)	202,000
98	Episode 7	9 April 2020 (Ten)	759,000
Shows featured: Married at First Sight, Tiger King, House Rules, Australian Survivor: All Stars, Food Safari Water, RBT, Tutankhamun: Life, Death and Legacy, Glow Up and The Late Late Show with James Corden.
99	Episode 8	15 April 2020 (LS)	199,000
99	Episode 8	16 April 2020 (Ten)	874,000
Shows featured: MasterChef Australia, 7.30, House Rules, The Bold and the Beautiful, Love Is Blind, Casino Royale, Paramedics, Richard Hammond's Big and March of the Penguins 2: The Next Step.
100	Episode 9	22 April 2020 (LS)	189,000
100	Episode 9	23 April 2020 (Ten)	601,000
Shows featured: Lego Masters, One World: Together at Home, MasterChef, Seven Worlds, One Planet, My Feet Are Killing Me, Gino's Italian Express, Free Solo, Welcome to Plathville, and You Can't Ask That.
101	Episode 10	29 April 2020 (LS)	184,000
101	Episode 10	30 April 2020 (Ten)	851,000
Shows featured: Britain's Got Talent, Too Hot to Handle, MasterChef Australia, Alone: The Beast, Marry Me, Marry My Family, Tiger King, Insight, Sweet Home Sextuplets, Sky News coverage of Anzac Day and Kokoda: The Spirit Lives.

=== Season 12 (2020) ===
No. overall	Episode	Original release date	Aus. viewers
102	Episode 1	26 August 2020 (LS)	202,000
102	Episode 1	27 August 2020 (Ten)	611,000
Shows featured: The Block, SBS World News, The Masked Singer Australia, The Bachelor Australia, Gordon Ramsay: Uncharted, Australian Ninja Warrior, Anh's Brush with Fame, Farmer Wants a Wife and The Elephant Hospital.
103	Episode 2	2 September 2020 (LS)	164,000
103	Episode 2	3 September 2020 (Ten)	604,000
Shows featured: Plate of Origin, The Masked Singer Australia, Paul Hollywood: City Bakes, Farmer Wants a Wife, Halifax: Retribution, The Big Flower Fight, Fight for Planet A: Our Climate Challenge, 90 Day Fiancé and The Joy of Painting.
104	Episode 3	9 September 2020 (LS)	172,000
104	Episode 3	10 September 2020 (Ten)	631,000
Shows featured: The Bachelor Australia, SBS World News, Natural World, The Block, (Un)well, Further Back in Time for Dinner, Emergency, America's Got Talent and The Living Room.
105	Episode 4	16 September 2020 (LS)	175,000
105	Episode 4	17 September 2020 (Ten)	644,000
Shows featured: Freeman, Drunk History, The Bachelor Australia, Plate of Origin, Save This Shark, Inside the Tower of London, Anh's Brush with Fame, Indian Matchmaking and Misery.
106	Episode 5	23 September 2020 (LS)	187,000
106	Episode 5	24 September 2020 (Ten)	654,000
Shows featured: The Masked Singer Australia, 9-1-1: Lone Star, The All New Monty: Guys & Gals, My Octopus Teacher, The World's Most Scenic Railway Journeys, The Speed Cubers, Keeping Up with the Kardashians, McMillions and The Block.
107	Episode 6	30 September 2020 (LS)	196,000
107	Episode 6	1 October 2020 (Ten)	475,000
Shows featured: The Bachelor Australia, The Ellen DeGeneres Show, Plate of Origin, Todd Sampson's Body Hack, Highway Patrol, My Pregnant Husband, Tiny Creatures, Gardening Australia and Taboo.
108	Episode 7	7 October 2020 (LS)	161,000
108	Episode 7	8 October 2020 (Ten)	613,000
Shows featured: The Block, Planet America, SBS World News, Our Planet, Rick Stein's Long Weekends, Bondi Rescue, Antiques Road Trip, Lindy Chamberlain: The True Story, Indian Matchmaking and Better Homes and Gardens.
109	Episode 8	14 October 2020 (LS)	189,000
109	Episode 8	15 October 2020 (Ten)	661,000
Shows featured: The Bachelorette, Infested! Living with Parasites, Junior MasterChef Australia, Halifax: Retribution, Sing On!, The Social Dilemma, Botched, Anh's Brush with Fame and A Secret Love.
110	Episode 9	21 October 2020 (LS)	173,000
110	Episode 9	22 October 2020 (Ten)	632,000
Shows featured: The Bachelorette Australia, Outback Ringer, John Torode's Asia, Floor Is Lava, The Secret Life of the Zoo, Paramedics, The World's Most Luxurious Prison, Gruen and Say I Do.
111	Episode 10	28 October 2020 (LS)	152,000
111	Episode 10	29 October 2020 (Ten)	700,000
Shows featured: SAS Australia finale, 2020 AFL Grand Final, The Living Room, Australia Come Fly With Me, Borat Subsequent Moviefilm, Junior MasterChef Australia, Class Action Park, The American Barbecue Showdown and David Attenborough: A Life on Our Planet

=== Season 13 (2021) ===
No. overall	Episode	Original release date	Aus. viewers
112	Episode 1	17 February 2021 (LS)	183,000
112	Episode 1	18 February 2021 (Ten)	502,000
Shows featured: Holey Moley, ABC News, We Are the Champions, Bridgerton, The Amazing Race Australia, Field Trip With Curtis Stone, Four Corners Downfall: The Last Days of Trump special, Fake Famous and Growing Old Disgracefully.
113	Episode 2	24 February 2021 (LS)	149,000
113	Episode 2	25 February 2021 (Ten)	517,000
Shows featured: Married at First Sight, Toddlers Behaving (Very) Badly, Animals on the Loose: A You vs. Wild Movie, Hairy Bikers' Mediterranean Adventure, Stutter School, Back Roads, The Toys That Made Us, Bling Empire and The End.
114	Episode 3	3 March 2021 (LS)	130,000
114	Episode 3	4 March 2021 (Ten)	596,000
Shows featured: The Cube, One Wild Day, Married at First Sight, The Invisible Man, Wife Swap Australia, The Great Pottery Throw Down, Tiger, Labor of Love and Our Dementia Choir.
115	Episode 4	10 March 2021 (LS)	148,000
115	Episode 4	11 March 2021 (Ten)	554,000
Shows featured: Ultimate Tag, SBS World News coverage of Mardi Gras, Hughesy, We Have a Problem, Rick Stein's Road to Mexico, The Amazing Race Australia, Amazing Grace, Framing Britney Spears, Territory Cops and Space Invaders.
116	Episode 5	17 March 2021 (LS)	168,000
116	Episode 5	18 March 2021 (Ten)	483,000
Shows featured: Oprah with Meghan and Harry, Nine News: The Crown in Crisis, SBS World News coverage of The Queen's first statement regarding Meghan Markle and Prince Harry's claims in the Oprah interview, ABC News coverage of Prince William's statement on racism, The Royal Fallout, Married at First Sight, Spy in the Wild, Marriage or Mortgage, Border Security, 24 Hours in A&E, We are the Champions and The Black Full Monty.
117	Episode 6	24 March 2021 (LS)	157,000
117	Episode 6	25 March 2021 (Ten)	509,000
Shows featured: The Great British Bake Off, SBS World News coverage of March 4 Justice, The Project story of NSW Police Commissioner Mick Fuller's consent app proposal, Dancing with the Birds, Antiques Roadshow, Insight: Favourite Child, Filthy Cities: Revolutionary Paris, Exposed: The Ghost Train Fire, Married at First Sight and Fisk.
118	Episode 7	31 March 2021 (LS)	138,000
118	Episode 7	1 April 2021 (Ten)	496,000
Shows featured: The Amazing Race Australia, A Current Affair interview with Scott Morrison, Britain's Got Talent: Acts That Stormed the World, Hard Quiz, Great Australian Railway Journeys, James May: Our Man in Japan, Jojo Rabbit, Botched and Tina.
119	Episode 8	7 April 2021 (LS)	162,000
119	Episode 8	8 April 2021 (Ten)	536,000
Shows featured: Old People's Home for 4 Year Olds, The Project report on Hey Hey It's Saturday racism, 7.30, Highway Patrol, Married At First Sight, The Secret Life of the Zoo, Rick Stein's Far Eastern Odyssey, Bondi Rescue, The Living Room and Exposed: The Ghost Train Fire.
120	Episode 9	14 April 2021 (LS)	154,000
120	Episode 9	15 April 2021 (Ten)	540,000
Shows featured: Married at First Sight, SBS World News coverage of the Death and funeral of Prince Philip, Duke of Edinburgh, Dancing with the Stars, The Dog House, Insight, Marilyn Monroe: Auction of a Lifetime, Ambulance UK, Stackorama! and David Attenborough's Seven Worlds, One Planet.
121	Episode 10	21 April 2021 (LS)	154,000
121	Episode 10	22 April 2021 (Ten)	605,000
Shows featured: MasterChef Australia, Grand Designs Australia, Lego Masters, Wild Metropolis, Anh's Brush with Fame, Worn Stories, Dancing with the Stars and Old People's Home for 4 Year Olds.

=== Season 14 (2021) ===
No. overall	Episode	Original release date	Aus. viewers
122	Episode 1	8 September 2021 (LS)	179,000
122	Episode 1	9 September 2021 (Ten)	633,000
Shows featured: The Bachelor Australia, The Block, The Voice, The Great Pottery Throw Down, What Does Australia Really Think About..., 90 Day Fiancé, Question Everything and Australian Survivor: Brains V Brawn
123	Episode 2	15 September 2021 (LS)	173,000
123	Episode 2	16 September 2021 (Ten)	610,000
Shows featured: The Voice finale, ABC News coverage of the 20th anniversary of the September 11 attacks, Australian Survivor: Brains V Brawn finale, Luxe Listings Sydney, Antiques Road Trip, The Hundred with Andy Lee, Strong Female Lead, The Greatest Dancer and Mirror Mirror
124	Episode 3	22 September 2021 (LS)	173,000
124	Episode 3	23 September 2021 (Ten)	529,000
Shows featured: SAS Australia, Aussie Snake Wranglers, Making It Australia, The Masked Singer Australia, Back to the Rafters, Buried by the Bernards, Paramedics, Gordon, Gino and Fred's American Road Trip and Osher Günsberg: A Matter of Life and Death
125	Episode 4	29 September 2021 (LS)	165,000
125	Episode 4	30 September 2021 (Ten)	667,000
Shows featured: The Block, The Project report on Melbourne anti-lockdown protests and the 2021 Mansfield earthquake, 2021 AFL Grand Final, The Great Celebrity Bake Off, Young Talent Time: Unmasked, Sexy Beasts, Rick Stein: From Venice to Istanbul, Lost for Words, Say Yes to the Dress and The School That Tried to End Racism
126	Episode 5	6 October 2021 (LS)	166,000
126	Episode 5	7 October 2021 (Ten)	634,000
Shows featured: SAS Australia, 2021 NRL Grand Final, Love It or List It Australia, Ted Lasso, Spy in the Wild, The Cheap Seats, Insight: Celibacy, LuLaRich and Tall Poppy: A Skater's Story
127	Episode 6	13 October 2021 (LS)	154,000
127	Episode 6	14 October 2021 (Ten)	577,000
Shows featured: Celebrity MasterChef Australia, Naked and Afraid, The Real Housewives of Melbourne, Hey Hey We're 50, Weakest Link: The Block special, The Masked Singer Australia, Lost for Words, The White Lotus and Adam and Poh's Malaysia in Australia
128	Episode 7	20 October 2021 (LS)	165,000
128	Episode 7	21 October 2021 (Ten)	596,000
Shows featured: The Real Housewives of Melbourne, The Dog House Australia, The Block, Love Island Australia, The Great British Sewing Bee, Gruen, Girls Can't Surf, SAS Australia finale and Hell's Kitchen
129	Episode 8	27 October 2021 (LS)	143,000
129	Episode 8	28 October 2021 (Ten)	505,000
Shows featured: The Bachelorette Australia,The Greek Islands with Julia Bradbury, Love It or List It Australia, Highway Patrol, I Love A Mama's Boy, Big Deal, Spreadsheet, Trial by Media and Tiny World
130	Episode 9	3 November 2021 (LS)	156,000
130	Episode 9	4 November 2021 (Ten)	580,000
Shows featured: Parental Guidance, The Project story on Bert Newton's death, The Real Housewives of Melbourne, The Block, Great Canadian Railway Journeys, The Bachelorette, Fires, Wrinkles the Clown and Wentworth
131	Episode 10	10 November 2021 (LS)	135,000
131	Episode 10	10 November 2021 (Ten)	503,000
Shows featured: The Block, Bargain Hunt, Big Brother VIP, Long Lost Family: The Unknown Soldiers, Love Island Australia, Celebrity MasterChef Australia, Incarceration Nation, Sex, Love & Goop & Dads

=== Season 15 (2022) ===
No. overall	Episode	Original release date	Aus. viewers
–	Celebrity Special	2 March 2022 (LS)	148,000
–	Celebrity Special	3 March 2022 (Ten)	571,000
Shows featured: Australian Survivor: Blood V Water, Married at First Sight, Dancing with the Stars: All Stars, Celebrity MasterChef UK, SAS Australia, The Rescue, Shane: King of Spin and We're Here
132	Episode 1	9 March 2022 (LS)	132,000
132	Episode 1	10 March 2022 (Ten)	574,000
Shows featured: Meet the Meerkats, The Great Australian Bake Off, Would I Lie to You? Australia, Space Invaders, First Dates, Outback Ringer, Celebrity Gogglebox Australia on Married at First Sight, Dancing with the Stars: All Stars, Celebrity MasterChef UK and Shane: King of Spin and ABC News on the death of Shane Warne
133	Episode 2	16 March 2022 (LS)	116,000
133	Episode 2	17 March 2022 (Ten)	483,000
Shows featured: Married at First Sight, Australia Unites: Red Cross Flood Appeal, The Dog House Australia, Byron Baes, SAS Australia, Million Pound Menu, The Tinder Swindler, The Hundred with Andy Lee and Insight
134	Episode 3	23 March 2022 (LS)	109,000
134	Episode 3	23 March 2022 (Ten)	434,000
Shows featured: Too Hot to Handle, Crikey! It's Shark Week, Dancing with the Stars: All Stars, Australian Survivor: Blood V Water, Making Fun, Property Brothers: Forever Home, Life on the Outside, Police Strike Force and Freddie Mercury: The Final Act
135	Episode 4	30 March 2022 (LS)	102,000
135	Episode 4	31 March 2022 (Ten)	502,000
Shows featured: Is It Cake?, The Project report on Ash Barty's retirement from tennis, Married at First Sight, Ambulance Australia, Rachel Khoo's Chocolat, Queer Eye: More than a Makeover, A Dog's World, You, Me & My Ex and Hollywood Medium with Tyler Henry
136	Episode 5	6 April 2022 (LS)	111,000
136	Episode 5	7 April 2022 (Ten)	533,000
Shows featured: Love Is Blind, The Project report on the Chris Rock–Will Smith slapping incident, Selling Houses Australia, Married at First Sight, Dancing with the Stars: All Stars finale, Puff: Wonders of the Reef, Underbelly: Vanishing Act, Tomorrow Tonight and the Shane Warne Memorial Service
137	Episode 6	13 April 2022 (LS)	109,000
137	Episode 6	14 April 2022 (Ten)	370,000
Shows featured: Luxe Listings Sydney, Travel Guides, Australian Survivor: Blood V Water finale, America's Got Talent: Extreme, Animals with Cameras, Bridgerton, The People's Republic of Mallacoota, Formula 1: Drive to Survive and The Living Room
138	Episode 7	20 April 2022 (LS)	111,000
138	Episode 7	21 April 2022 (Ten)	543,000
Shows featured: MasterChef Australia, Out Greatest National Parks, Lego Masters, The Ultimatum: Marry or Move On, Hard Quiz, Super Rich Sleepover, Would I Lie to You? Australia, Tiny Oz and My Feet Are Killing Me
139	Episode 8	27 April 2022 (LS)	119,000
139	Episode 8	28 April 2022 (Ten)	543,000
Shows featured: The Voice, First Dates, The Kardashians, Hey Hey It's 100 Years, Botched, Inside the Tower of London, Secrets of Playboy, Barons and Project Runway
140	Episode 9	4 May 2022 (LS)	138,000
140	Episode 9	5 May 2022 (Ten)	570,000
Shows featured: The Weekly with Charlie Pickering, Lego Masters, The Repair Shop Australia, MasterChef Australia, Old Enough!, The Cheap Seats, White Hot: The Rise & Fall of Abercrombie & Fitch, Grand Designs Australia and Nurses

=== Season 16 (2022) ===
No. overall	Episode	Original release date	Aus. viewers
141	Episode 1	24 August 2022 (LS)	146,000
141	Episode 1	25 August 2022 (Ten)	450,000
Shows featured: The Block, Our Yorkshire Farm, The Masked Singer, Paul Hollywood Eats Japan, Stuck, House of the Dragon and My Kitchen Rules
142	Episode 2	31 August 2022 (LS)	99,000
142	Episode 2	1 September 2022 (Ten)	381,000
Shows featured: Selling the OC, Wild Japan: Snow Monkeys, The Hundred with Andy Lee, The Julia Child Challenge, Old People's Home for Teenagers, The Bridge, Fearless: The Inside Story of the AFLW, Alone: Frozen and The Masked Singer
143	Episode 3	7 September 2022 (LS)	121,000
143	Episode 3	8 September 2022 (Ten)	410,000
Shows featured: Farmer Wants a Wife, Meet the Hedgehogs, My Kitchen Rules Grand Final, The Amazing Race Australia, Cosmic Love, Domino Masters, Rick Stein's Cornwall, Summer Love and Trainwreck: Woodstock '99
144	Episode 4	14 September 2022 (LS)	114,000
144	Episode 4	15 September 2022 (Ten)	400,000
Shows featured: The Block, Extreme Weddings: Australia, ABC News, Seven News and Sky News coverage of the Death and funeral of Queen Elizabeth II, The Project's coverage of the Accession of King Charles III and ABC News' broadcast of King Charles III's first speech, Snowflake Mountain, The Streets with Dan Hong, Raising A F***ing Star, Australian Story, The Cheap Seats and The Lord of the Rings: The Rings of Power
145	Episode 5	21 September 2022 (LS)	133,000
145	Episode 5	22 September 2022 (Ten)	219,000
Shows featured: The Bridge, 90 Day: The Single Life, The Great Pottery Throw Down, Iron Chef: Quest for an Iron Legend, We're All Gonna Die (Even Jay Baruchel), Farmer Wants a Wife, Untold: The Race of the Century, Buy My House and The Rehearsal
146	Episode 6	28 September 2022 (LS)	108,000
146	Episode 6	29 September 2022 (Ten)	441,000
Shows featured: The Block, 2022 AFL Grand Final, The Amazing Race Australia, Indian Matchmaking, Old People's Home for Teenagers, Next Level Chef, Armed and Dangerous, Blown Away and Below Deck Mediterranean
147	Episode 7	5 October 2022 (LS)	112,000
147	Episode 7	6 October 2022 (Ten)	415,000
Shows featured: Farmer Wants a Wife, 2022 NRL Grand Final, My Lottery Dream Home, Courtney's Closet, Handmade: Good with Wood, Joe Millionaire: For Richer or Poorer, This England, Hard Quiz and ABBA: The Missing 40 Years
148	Episode 8	12 October 2022 (LS)	101,000
148	Episode 8	13 October 2022 (Ten)	557,000
Shows featured: Luxe Listings Sydney, The Real Love Boat, Dishing It Up, The Block, Animals with Cameras: Oceans, Australia's Got Talent, Keep On Dancing, The Great British Bake Off and Dr. Pimple Popper
149	Episode 9	19 October 2022 (LS)	101,000
149	Episode 9	20 October 2022 (Ten)	458,000
Shows featured: The Traitors, Bling Empire, Kitchen Nightmares Australia, Mirror Mirror: Love and Hate, Naked and Afraid of Love, Taronga: Who's Who in the Zoo, Lost for Words, 90 Day: The Single Life and Tom Gleeson's Secrets of the Australian Museum
150	Episode 10	26 October 2022 (LS)	126,000
150	Episode 10	27 October 2022 (Ten)	493,000
Shows featured: Extreme Weddings: Australia, Gordon, Gino and Fred's Road Trip, Wild Croc Territory, Selling in the City, Me and My Tourettes, The Block, Undressed with Kathryn Eisman, Australia's Got Talent and A League of Their Own

=== Season 17 (2023) ===
No. overall	Episode	Original release date	Aus. viewers
151	Episode 1	22 February 2023 (LS)	124,000
151	Episode 1	23 February 2023 (Ten)	480,000
Shows featured: Australian Idol, Married at First Sight, Grand Designs Australia, Australian Survivor: Heroes V Villains, The White Lotus, Big Miracles, Taskmaster Australia and Better Date Than Never
152	Episode 2	1 March 2023 (LS)	102,000
152	Episode 2	2 March 2023 (Ten)	416,000
Shows featured: Married at First Sight, 10 News First report on the Sydney Gay and Lesbian Mardi Gras, The Project story on Olivia Newton-John's State Memorial Service, RocKwiz, South Park, Would I Lie to You? Australia, Starstruck, Queerstralia, Last King of the Cross and sMothered
153	Episode 3	8 March 2023 (LS)	112,000
153	Episode 3	9 March 2023 (Ten)	405,000
Shows featured: Space Invaders, The Dog House Australia, Australian Survivor: Heroes V Villains, We Interrupt This Broadcast, Break Point, Back in Time for the Corner Shop, Trixie Motel, Perfect Match and The Last of Us
154	Episode 4	15 March 2023 (LS)	103,000
154	Episode 4	16 March 2023 (Ten)	395,000
Shows featured: Married at First Sight, River Cottage United, The Hundred with Andy Lee, Colin From Accounts, Wildlife ER, The Swap, 1923, Blowing LA and Surgeons
155	Episode 5	22 March 2023 (LS)	115,000
155	Episode 5	23 March 2023 (Ten)	350,000
Shows featured: Australian Idol, The Repair Shop, Grand Designs Australia, Tulsa King, Jamie Cooks Italy, Dinosaur with Stephen Fry, Physical: 100, Hard Quiz and MH370: The Plane That Disappeared
156	Episode 6	29 March 2023 (LS)	123,000
156	Episode 6	30 March 2023 (Ten)	368,000
Shows featured: Married at First Sight, The Weekly with Charlie Pickering, Australian Survivor: Heroes V Villains, Selling Houses Australia, Best In Dough, Ted Lasso, The Swap, Are You the One? and Big Ben Restored
157	Episode 7	5 April 2023 (LS)	117,000
157	Episode 7	6 April 2023 (Ten)	284,000
Shows featured: I'm a Celebrity...Get Me Out of Here!, The Super Squirrels, Alone Australia, The Antiques Yard, Rabbit Hole, Britain's Got Talent: The Ultimate Magician, Gunther's Millions, Clarkson's Farm and RPA
158	Episode 8	12 April 2023 (LS)	88,000
158	Episode 8	13 April 2023 (Ten)	364,000
Shows featured: I'm a Celebrity...Get Me Out of Here!, Farmhouse Fixer, Lego Masters: Grand Masters, Farmer Wants a Wife, Frozen Planet II, Great Australian Stuff, Michael Palin: Into Iraq, The Great Cookbook Challenge with Jamie Oliver and Dawn of the Dolphins
159	Episode 9	19 April 2023 (LS)	88,000
159	Episode 9	20 April 2023 (Ten)	386,000
Shows featured: Farmer Wants a Wife, Young MasterChef, Our Yorkshire Farm, Bondi Rescue, Jury Duty, Grease: Rise of the Pink Ladies, Emergency NYC, So Freakin Cheap and Finding Michael
160	Episode 10	26 April 2023 (LS)	92,000
160	Episode 10	27 April 2023 (Ten)	381,000
Shows featured: Travel Guides, The Project's stories on the death of Father Bob Maguire and Barry Humphries' death, Don't Forget the Lyrics! USA, Lego Masters: Grand Masters, Beef, Selling Houses Australia, Asking For It, I'm a Celebrity...Get Me Out of Here! and MILF Manor

=== Season 18 (2023) ===
No. overall	Episode	Original release date	Aus. viewers
161	Episode 1	16 August 2023 (LS)	68,000
161	Episode 1	17 August 2023 (Ten)	442,000
Shows featured: The Voice, FIFA Women's World Cup: Quarter-final: Matildas vs France, The Great Australian Bake Off, Hunted, The Block, Dogs Behaving (Very) Badly Australia, War on Waste, The Traitors and FBOY Island
162	Episode 2	23 August 2023 (LS)	80,000
162	Episode 2	24 August 2023 (Ten)	385,000
Shows featured: The Great Pottery Throw Down, The Project story on Michael Parkinson's death, Down for Love, Location Location Location Australia, RFDS, The Hundred with Andy Lee, The Deepest Breath, Adam and Poh's Great Australian Bites and Dirty House Rescue: Queens of Clean
163	Episode 3	30 August 2023 (LS)	119,000
163	Episode 3	31 August 2023 (Ten)	413,000
Shows featured: The Block, Wild Isles, Thank God You're Here, Shark Tank, Billionaire Blooms, Mother and Son, Outback Farm, Stanley Tucci: Searching for Italy and And Just Like That...
164	Episode 4	6 September 2023 (LS)	128,000
164	Episode 4	7 September 2023 (Ten)	420,000
Shows featured: WTFAQ, The Cheap Seats, Designing the Hebrides, The Ultimatum: Marry or Move On, AI v Human: The Creativity Experiment, Telemarketers, B&B by the Sea, RuPaul's Drag Race Down Under and Special Ops: Lioness
165	Episode 5	13 September 2023 (LS)	113,000
165	Episode 5	14 September 2023 (Ten)	458,000
Shows featured: The Masked Singer, Help, I've Gone Viral!, The Traitors finale, The Block, Rick Stein's Far Eastern Odyssey, The Voice, The Great Celebrity Bake Off, Painkiller and Lily's Life Hacks
166	Episode 6	20 September 2023 (LS)	119,000
166	Episode 6	21 September 2023 (Ten)	462,000
Shows featured: Gino's Italian Express, The Masked Singer, Jewish Matchmaking, Big Beasts, Hard Quiz, Ready to Mingle, Con Girl, The Inspired Unemployed (Impractical) Jokers and The Lovers
167	Episode 7	27 September 2023 (LS)	92,000
167	Episode 7	28 September 2023 (Ten)	435,000
Shows featured: Selling the OC, Mt Hutt Rescue, The Block, Shark Tank, New Leash on Life, Alaska Off the Grid, I Kissed a Boy, Paradise Kitchen Bali and Revealed: Danielle Laidley: Two Tribes
168	Episode 8	4 October 2023 (LS)	100,000
168	Episode 8	5 October 2023 (Ten)	430,000
Shows featured: Love It or List It Australia, 2023 AFL Grand Final and 2023 NRL Grand Final, Old People's Home for Teenagers, The Block, Below Deck Mediterranean, Thank God You're Here finale, Five Star Chef, Hoarder House Flippers and Finding Satoshi
169	Episode 9	11 October 2023 (LS)	109,000
169	Episode 9	12 October 2023 (Ten)	398,000
Shows featured: The Real Housewives of Sydney, Luke Nguyen's India, The Voice, The Amazing Race: Celebrity Edition, The Great British Sewing Bee, Heat, The Point: Referendum Road Trip, Love Triangle and Adam Hills: Grow Another Foot
170	Episode 10	18 October 2023 (LS)	127,000
170	Episode 10	19 October 2023 (Ten)	422,000
Shows featured: SAS Australia: Who Dares Wins, The Real Housewives of Sydney, The Project story on Cal Wilson's death, The Amazing Race: Celebrity Edition, Animals Up Close with Bertie Gregory, George Clarke's Amazing Spaces, Beckham, Hot Yachts and The Block
–	Celebrity Special for ReachOut Australia	25 October 2023 (LS)	133,000
–	Celebrity Special for ReachOut Australia	26 October 2023 (Ten)	433,000
Shows featured: Married at First Sight, I'm a Celebrity...Get Me Out of Here!, Selling Houses Australia, The Masked Singer, FBOY Island Australia, MasterChef Australia, 2023 AFL Grand Final, 2023 NRL Grand Final, FIFA Women's World Cup: Quarter-final: Matildas vs France and John Farnham: Finding the Voice

=== Season 19 (2024) ===
No. overall	Episode	Original release date	Aus. viewers
171	Episode 1	21 February 2024 (LS)	
171	Episode 1	22 February 2024 (Ten)	538,000
Shows featured: Married at First Sight, Life in Colour with David Attenborough, Australian Survivor: Titans V Villains, Live Italian, Barbie Dreamhouse Challenge, Australian Idol, The Dog House Australia and Nemesis
172	Episode 2	28 February 2024 (LS)	
172	Episode 2	29 February 2024 (Ten)	N/A
Shows featured: Married at First Sight, Paul Hollywood Eats Mexico, Big Miracles, Better Date Than Never, Boy Swallows Universe, Ambulance Australia, The Garden: Commune or Cult, Deal or No Deal and The Bad Skin Clinic
173	Episode 3	6 March 2024 (LS)	
173	Episode 3	7 March 2024 (Ten)	N/A
Shows featured: Australian Idol, Somebody Feed Phil, Grand Designs New Zealand, Australian Survivor: Titans V Rebels, Earthsounds, NCIS: Sydney, King Con: The Life and Times of Hamish McLaren, Tipping Point and Strip
174	Episode 4	13 March 2024 (LS)	
174	Episode 4	14 March 2024 (Ten)	N/A
Shows featured: Married at First Sight, Ready Steady Cook, The 1% Club, Blown Away, Compass, Ted, Dance Life, Griselda and Stone Cold Takes on America
175	Episode 5	20 March 2024 (LS)	
175	Episode 5	21 March 2024 (Ten)	N/A
Shows featured: Australian Idol, Gordon, Gino and Fred: Viva España!, Australian Survivor: Titans V Rebels, Queens, Space Invaders, Apples Never Fall, Tex Mex Motors, The Hundred with Andy Lee and Teen Mom: Family Reunion
176	Episode 6	27 March 2024 (LS)	
176	Episode 6	28 March 2024 (Ten)	N/A
Shows featured: I'm a Celebrity...Get Me Out of Here!, The Sunday Project report on Princess Kate's cancer diagnosis, Jamie's One-Pan Wonders, Married at First Sight, Selling Houses Australia, Gordon Ramsay's Food Stars, High Country, Hard Quiz and Robert De Niro: Hiding in the Spotlight
177	Episode 7	3 April 2024 (LS)	
177	Episode 7	4 April 2024 (Ten)	N/A
Shows featured: Married at First Sight, A Real Bug's Life, I'm a Celebrity...Get Me Out of Here!, Amanda and Alan's Italian Job, Alone Australia, Antiques Road Trip, The Greatest Night in Pop, Gardening Australia and Buying Beverly Hills
178	Episode 8	10 April 2024 (LS)	
178	Episode 8	11 April 2024 (Ten)	N/A
Shows featured: Gordon Ramsay's Food Stars, Going Fur Gold, I'm a Celebrity...Get Me Out of Here!, Love Is Blind, Britain by Steam: Full Speed Ahead, Ink Master, Mary & George, America's Got Talent: Fantasy League and Still: A Michael J. Fox Movie
179	Episode 9	17 April 2024 (LS)	
179	Episode 9	18 April 2024 (Ten)	N/A
Shows featured: Farmer Wants a Wife, Stanley Tucci: Searching for Italy, Bluey, Lego Masters, Love & Translation, The Dog House Australia, White Fever, The McBee Dynasty: Real American Cowboys and The Sunday Project report on the 2024 Bondi Junction stabbings
180	Episode 10	24 April 2024 (LS)	
180	Episode 10	25 April 2024 (Ten)	N/A
Shows featured: I'm a Celebrity...Get Me Out of Here!, Our Living World, Love on the Spectrum, MasterChef Australia, Limitless with Chris Hemsworth, The Real Housewives of Cheshire, Rick Stein's Cornwall, Insight story on super fans and Heartbreak High

=== Season 20 (2024) ===
No. overall	Episode	Original release date	Aus. viewers
181	Episode 1	14 August 2024 (LS)	N/A
181	Episode 1	15 August 2024 (Ten)	N/A
Shows featured: Hunted, Secret World of Sound with David Attenborough, Dancing with the Stars, Colin from Accounts, The Block, FBOY Island Australia, Sprint and Bondi Rescue
182	Episode 2	21 August 2024 (LS)	N/A
182	Episode 2	22 August 2024 (Ten)	N/A
Shows featured: The Voice, Logie Awards of 2024, The Block, Thank God You're Here, Inside the Mind of a Dog, Too Hot to Handle, Fake, The Secret World of Snacks and Ray Martin: The Last Goodbye
183	Episode 3	28 August 2024 (LS)	N/A
183	Episode 3	29 August 2024 (Ten)	N/A
Shows featured: The Voice, The Assembly, Chimp Crazy, Hunted, Made in Bondi, RuPaul's Drag Race Global All Stars, OceanXplorers, Barbecue Showdown and Curtis McGrath Unstoppable
184	Episode 4	4 September 2024 (LS)	N/A
184	Episode 4	4 September 2024 (Ten)	N/A
Shows featured: The Block, Guy Montgomery's Guy Mont-Spelling Bee, Great Australian Walks, Dogs Behaving (Very) Badly Australia, Last King of the Cross, Finding Magic Mike, Daughters, Below Deck Mediterranean and The Man with 1000 Kids
185	Episode 5	11 September 2024 (LS)	N/A
185	Episode 5	12 September 2024 (Ten)	N/A
Shows featured: Hunted, The Project interview with Rachael Gunn, Secret Lives of Orangutans, The Amazing Race: Celebrity Edition, Say Yes to the Dress, My Kitchen Rules, Downey's Dream Cars, Return to Paradise and The Hundred with Andy Lee
186	Episode 6	18 September 2024 (LS)	N/A
186	Episode 6	19 September 2024 (Ten)	N/A
Shows featured: The Voice, The Project, The Bolt Report and ABC News reports on the Trump-Harris presidential debate, The Inspired Unemployed (Impractical) Jokers, FBOY Island Australia, The Secret Lives of Mormon Wives, Critical Incident, Secrets of the Hells Angels, The Amazing Race: Celebrity Edition and Jack Whitehall: Fatherhood with My Father
187	Episode 7	25 September 2024 (LS)	N/A
187	Episode 7	26 September 2024 (Ten)	N/A
Shows featured: Friends, Taskmaster Australia, The Great Australian Bake Off, Luxury Escapes: The World's Best Holidays, Shaun Micallef's Origin Odyssey, Back in the Groove, American Nightmare, Searching for Soul Food and Barbie
188	Episode 8	2 October 2024 (LS)	N/A
188	Episode 8	3 October 2024 (Ten)	N/A
Shows featured: My Kitchen Rules, The Project story on the 2024 AFL Grand Final, Penguin Town, Take 5 with Zan Rowe, English Teacher, Thank God You're Here, The Penguin, The Block and Dr. Pimple Popper
189	Episode 9	9 October 2024 (LS)	N/A
189	Episode 9	10 October 2024 (Ten)	N/A
Shows featured: The Great Outdoors, 2024 NRL Grand Final, FBOY Island Australia, Moonshiners: Master Distiller, Chef's Table, Selling Sunset, Aussie Shore and Australian Story
190	Episode 10	16 October 2024 (LS)	N/A
190	Episode 10	17 October 2024 (Ten)	N/A
Shows featured: Dessert Masters, Secrets of the Octopus, The Amazing Race: Celebrity Edition, Nobody Wants This, Outlast, Australia's Most Dangerous Prisoners, Will & Harper, Travel Man and The Twelve

=== Season 21 (2025) ===
No. overall	Episode	Original release date	Aus. viewers
191	Episode 1	20 February 2025	N/A
Shows featured: Married at First Sight, The Secret Lives of Animals, Australian Survivor: Brains V Brawn II, The Role of a Lifetime, Australian Idol, I'm a Celebrity...Get Me Out of Here!, Big Miracles and Island Echoes with Nornie Bero
192	Episode 2	27 February 2025	N/A
Shows featured: The Real Housewives of Sydney, Below Deck Down Under, Beast Games, The Dog House Australia, The White Lotus, Deal or No Deal, Married at First Sight, Apple Cider Vinegar and Eat the Invaders
193	Episode 3	6 March 2025	N/A
Shows featured: Australian Survivor: Brains V Brawn II, Mammals, Selling Houses Australia, NCIS: Sydney, No Taste Like Home with Antoni Porowski, Blink, Muslim Matchmaker, Australia: An Unofficial History and Hard Quiz
194	Episode 4	13 March 2025	N/A
Shows featured: Married at First Sight, 10 News First and The Project coverage on Cyclone Alfred, With Love, Meghan, Australian Idol, Space Invaders, Good Cop/Bad Cop, Young, Famous & African, Muster Dogs: Collies and Kelpies and The Graham Norton Show
195	Episode 5	19 March 2025	N/A
Shows featured: Australian Survivor: Brains V Brawn II, Memory Bites with Matt Moran, Formula 1: Drive to Survive, A Real Bug's Life, Geordie Stories: Charlotte's New Baby, Back Roads, Is It Cake?, Deli Boys and Dr. Pimple Popper
196	Episode 6	27 March 2025	N/A
Shows featured: Alone Australia, The Real Housewives of Sydney, Sam Pang Tonight, Inside, Harry Potter: Wizards of Baking, Amanda & Alan's Spanish Job, The Americas, Landman and Tipping Point
197	Episode 7	3 April 2025	N/A
Shows featured: Australian Idol, Field Trip With Curtis Stone, The Later Daters, Australian Survivor: Brains V Brawn II, Smoggie Queens, Taskmaster Australia, Creative Types with Virginia Trioli, Adolescence and David Blaine: Do Not Attempt
198	Episode 8	10 April 2025	N/A
Shows featured: Married at First Sight, Love Triangle, The Project story on the death of Val Kilmer, Australian Idol, Urvi Went to an All Girls' School, Sydney's Super Tunnel, Gold & Greed: The Hunt for Fenn's Treasure, Secrets of the Zoo, MobLand and Runn
199	Episode 9	17 April 2025	N/A
Shows featured: Australian Survivor: Brains V Brawn II, Airborne: Nature in Our Skies, Love on the Spectrum, Restoration Australia, The Studio, Judi Love's Culinary Cruise, Dirty Jobs with Mike Rowe, The White Lotus and Botched
200	Episode 10	24 April 2025	N/A
Shows featured: Farmer Wants a Wife, The Project coverage of the Death and funeral of Pope Francis, Travel Guides, The Secret DNA of Us, Secrets of the Penguins, Claire Hooper's House of Games, Baylen Out Loud, The Last of Us and The Dog House Australia

=== Season 22 (2025) ===
No. overall	Episode	Original release date	Aus. viewers
201	Episode 1	28 August 2025	N/A
Shows featured: Australian Survivor: Australia V The World, The Voice, The Block, Somebody Feed Phil, Trainwreck: Poop Cruise, Great Australian Road Trips, The Great Australian Bake Off and Playing Gracie Darling
202	Episode 2	4 September 2025	N/A
Shows featured: My Kitchen Rules, Dogs Behaving (Very) Badly Australia, Are You My First?, The Block, The Wild Ones, The Great Canadian Pottery Throw Down, Fit for TV: The Reality of The Biggest Loser, Stans and Big Backyard Quiz
203	Episode 3	11 September 2025	N/A
Shows featured: The Amazing Race: Celebrity Edition, The Pasta Queen, Australian Survivor: Australia V The World, Playground, Grand Designs New Zealand, The Voice, Underdogs, Paramedics and The Thursday Murder Club
204	Episode 4	18 September 2025	N/A
Shows featured: Talkin' 'Bout Your Gen, Great British Railway Journeys, My Kitchen Rules, NCIS: Tony & Ziva, KPopped, Jay & Pamela, Love Is Blind: UK, Australian Story and Dancing with Sharks
205	Episode 5	25 September 2025	N/A
Shows featured: The Amazing Race: Celebrity Edition, The Real Housewives of London, Revealed: Death Cap Murders, Botched Presents: Plastic Surgery Rewind, Ocean with David Attenborough, Off the Grid with Colin and Manu, Tipping Point, The People vs Robodebt and Tulsa King
206	Episode 6	2 October 2025	N/A
Shows featured: The Block, RFDS, Dolphins Up Close with Bertie Gregory, Interior Design Masters with Alan Carr, Beyond Bali with Lara Lee, Mother and Son, Aussie Shore, Ruby Red Handed: Stealing America's Most Famous Pair of Shoes and The Inspired Unemployed's: The List
207	Episode 7	9 October 2025	N/A
Shows featured: Love It or List It Australia, Deal or No Deal, 007: Road to a Million, Below Deck, Back Roads, Top End Bub, The Reluctant Traveller with Eugene Levy, Fake or Fortune? and The Paper
208	Episode 8	16 October 2025	N/A
Shows featured: My Kitchen Rules, Sam Pang Tonight, Hard Quiz Kids, Octopus!, The Celebrity Traitors, Building the Band, Hotel Costiera, Tell Me What You Really Think and Olivia Attwood: Getting Filthy Rich
209	Episode 9	23 October 2025	N/A
Shows featured: The Golden Bachelor, The Assembly, The Amazing Race: Celebrity Edition, NCIS: Sydney, The Voice, Zillow Gone Wild, James Can Eat, Chad Powers and Dr. Pimple Popper: Breaking Out
210	Episode 10	30 October 2025	N/A
Shows featured: The Block, Wife Swap: The Real Housewives Edition, My Kitchen Rules, KPop Demon Hunters, The Dog House Australia: Package Deal, Is It Cake? Halloween, The Twisted Tale of Amanda Knox, End Game with Tony Armstrong and Ozzy: No Escape from Now
–	Episode 11 (Best of 2025)	2 November 2025	N/A

=== Season 23 (2026) ===
No. overall	Episode	Original release date	Aus. viewers
211	Episode 1	19 February 2026	N/A
Shows featured: Married at First Sight, Australian Idol, I'm a Celebrity...Get Me Out of Here!, The Cook Up with Adam Liaw, Grand Designs Transformations, Below Deck Down Under, Millionaire Hot Seat and Heated Rivalry
212	Episode 2	26 February 2026	N/A
Shows featured: Australian Survivor: Redemption, Muster Dogs, Married at First Sight, I'm a Celebrity...Get Me Out of Here!, Australia's Greatest Conman?, Game of Wool, Reality Check: Inside America's Next Top Model, A Sorority Mom's Guide to Rush! and Cool Runnings
213	Episode 3	4 March 2026	N/A
Shows featured: Australian Idol, Taronga: Who's Who in the Zoo, The Traitors US, NCIS: Sydney, Being Gordon Ramsay, Todd Sampson's Why?, Queer Eye, Going Places with Ernie Dingo and Sunny Nights
214	Episode 4	12 March 2026	N/A
Shows featured: Australian Survivor: Redemption, Scrubs, Married at First Sight, Born to Be Wild, Selling Houses Australia, Pole to Pole with Will Smith, Marshals: A Yellowstone Story, The Hospital: In the Deep End and Tonight at the Museum
215	Episode 5	19 March 2026	N/A
Shows featured: The Piano, Age of Attraction, Space Invaders, Jamie: Eat Yourself Healthy, Britain's Got Talent, The Imposter, Formula 1: Drive to Survive, Amanda and Alan's Greek Job and The Devil Is Busy
216	Episode 6	26 March 2026	N/A
Shows featured: Australian Idol, AFC Women's Asian Cup Final: Japan vs Matildas, 10 News report on the AFC Women's Asian Cup Final, The Dinosaurs, Australian Survivor: Redemption, Love Story: John F. Kennedy Jr. & Carolyn Bessette, Surfest 40 Years, New York Gourmet with Justine Schofield, Louis Theroux: Inside the Manosphere and The Great Pottery Throw Down
217	Episode 7	2 April 2026	N/A
Shows featured: Wild Winter, Deal or No Deal, Jury Duty Presents: Company Retreat, The Madison, Creative Types with Virginia Trioli, Women & the Wind, Homebodies, Top Chef and The Secret Lives of Mormon Wives
218	Episode 8	9 April 2026	N/A
Shows featured: Love on the Spectrum, Rooster, Australian Survivor: Redemption, Married at First Sight, Parenthood, Back Roads, Tour de Fred: Northern Ireland, Beast Games and Curfew
219	Episode 9	16 April 2026	N/A
Shows featured: Australian Idol, Tipping Point, Love Overboard, Donna Hay Coastal Celebrations, Australian Survivor: Redemption, Our Medicine, Gold Wars Downunder, Judgment: Cases That Changed Australia and The Audacity
220	Episode 10	23 April 2026	N/A
Shows featured: The Floor, Secrets of the Bees, MasterChef Australia, The Piano, My Reno Rules, Locals Welcome, The Miniature Wife, The Claudia Winkleman Show and About Face
–	Episode 11 (Fan Favourites)	30 April 2026	N/A

=== Season 24 (2026) ===
No. overall	Episode	Original release date	Aus. viewers
221	Episode 1	23 August 2026	N/A
Shows featured: The Block, The Traitors, The Voice, Ted Lasso, Portrait Artist of the Year, Shaun Micallef's Origin Odyssey, The Great Australian Bake Off and Two Years Later
222	Episode 2	30 August 2026	N/A
Shows featured: Alone Australia, Cheetahs Up Close with Bertie Gregory, The Traitors, Take 5 with Zan Rowe, Let's Marry Harry, Banjo & Ro's Grand Island Hotel, Bridey Drake: Pure Average, Dancing with the Stars: The Next Pro and Lioness
223	Episode 3	6 September 2026	N/A
Shows featured: The Voice, 60 Minutes, Deal or No Deal: Celebrity Jackpot, Dalliance, Monsters of God, Matt Preston's Plating Locally, Young Farts Trailer Parts, States of Mind and Spicks and Specks
224	Episode 4	13 September 2026	N/A
Shows featured: The Traitors, Untold Raygun: Breaking Badly, Lion, The Block, Deadliest Dinners Australia, Widow's Bay, First Dates, Back Roads and The Magic Faraway Tree
225	Episode 5	20 September 2026	N/A
Shows featured: Love Is Blind: UK, Sydney Harbour Cops, The Simpsons: Yellow Mirror, 70 Years of Television, Pompeii: Out of Time with Tom Hiddleston, Selling Houses Australia, Death Valley and Precious Metal: A Love Story
226	Episode 6	27 September 2026	N/A
Shows featured: Who Wants to Be a Millionaire?, In the Eye of the Storm: Chasers, Gardening Australia, The Voice, Travel Guides, Million Dollar Nannies, Physical 100: Italy, Shaun Micallef's Origin Odyssey and MobLand
227	Episode 7	4 October 2026	TBD
Shows featured: Wonka's The Golden Ticket, Shaun Micallef's Parents' Evening, The Voice, Class Clowns, Getaway, Not Her First Rodeo, Breaking Bread with Tony Shalhoub, Last Seen and Team Moms: Baseball
228	Episode 8	11 October 2026	TBD
Shows featured: My Kitchen Rules, 1 Euro House, Portrait Artist of the Year, Gold Wars Downunder, The Love Hypothesis, The Jury: Skeleton in the Garden, Would You Rather: Decide to Survive, Marshals: A Yellowstone Story and Drew Binsky: Ultimate Traveler
229	Episode 9	18 October 2026	TBD
Shows featured: Africa: Earth's Wild Home, Chefs Ahoy, South Park, The Celebrity Traitors, Hard Quiz Kids, The State of Man, Off the Grid with Colin and Manu, Double Lives of Suburban Wives and 70 Up
230	Episode 10	18 October 2026	TBD
Shows featured: Sam Pang Tonight, Tina Arena: Unravel Me, Bill Bailey's Korea, Château DIY Australia, Recipe of the Year, The Last First: Winter K2, The Girls: A Khloé Kardashian Project, Gnomes and Aussie Shore
