= Gogglebox Australia =

Australian reality television series

- Genre: Reality television
- Based on: Gogglebox by: Stephen Lambert; Tania Alexander; Tim Harcourt
- Narrated by: Jo Van Es
- Country of origin: Australia
- Original language: English
- No. of seasons: 24
- No. of episodes: 230 (list of episodes)

Production
- Production locations: Melbourne, Victoria; Sydney, New South Wales; Brisbane, Queensland
- Running time: 50 minutes
- Production company: Shine Australia

Original release
- Network: LifeStyle (2015–2024); Network 10 (2015–present)
- Release: 11 February 2015 – present

Gogglebox Australia is an Australian reality television program which airs on Network 10. It is an adaptation of the British series of the same name. The series, which is produced by Shine Australia, was originally a co-production between subscription television (STV) channel Lifestyle (owned by Foxtel) and free-to-air (FTA) network Network 10. It aired on Lifestyle first, and then aired on Network 10 a day later.

== Production ==
The concept of Gogglebox Australia is based on the 2013 British reality show Gogglebox, in which people watch and comment on the week's popular television shows and films in their own homes. Producers chose ten households, featuring "a cross-section of modern Australian society, from larrikins to gays, from migrant families to battlers, yuppies and empty-nesters", to discuss the shows. The cast are filmed with remote-controlled cameras, while the crew stay out of their way in other parts of the house.

Voiceover artist Jo Van Es narrates the series. She initially had doubts that she would secure the role following her audition, and thought it would be a short contract. Van Es read a sample of the script without viewing the footage, which she described as "a little bit tricky", and she was told to give a largely neutral delivery. She said, "I thought, 'This is a weird concept for a show. It will probably be something I do for a little while and it will disappear into the winds like a lot of jobs do.' But it's just grown and grown." Van Es starts her recordings during Tuesday afternoons and the sessions last for around an hour. When footage of a certain scene is not available to view, the writers and producers explain to Van Es how the tone of the narration should be and what words to emphasise. Over the seasons, Van Es' delivery has added more sass compared to the "straight" narration style of the early seasons.

Ten episodes of Gogglebox Australia were initially commissioned. The first season aired on The LifeStyle Channel (later rebranded Lifestyle) and Network 10 between February and April 2015. At the conclusion of its debut season, the series was renewed for a second season, which premiered on STV on 30 September 2015, and on FTA on 1 October 2015.

On 21 September 2015, the series was renewed for a third season; which premiered on STV on 6 April 2016, and on FTA on 7 April 2016. On 8 February 2016, it was announced a fourth season had been commissioned; which premiered on STV on 24 August 2016, and on FTA on 25 August 2016.

On 4 November 2016, the series was renewed for a fifth season, which premiered on 15 February 2017. The series was later renewed for a sixth season, which premiered on 4 October 2017.

In November 2017, Foxtel announced that the series was renewed for two further seasons to air in 2018, with each season to increase from eight to 10 episodes. The ninth season premiered on 6 February 2019.

The twelfth season premiered on 26 August 2020 and the thirteenth season on 17 February 2021. The fourteenth season premiered on 8 September 2021.

In October 2021, Foxtel announced a celebrity one-off special of Gogglebox would feature in 2022. On 3 February 2022, Hamish and Zoë Foster Blake were confirmed as the first two cast members of the special. On 11 February, the full cast was announced. On 25 February 2022, Dylan Alcott and Andy Allen, Tim Campbell and Anthony Callea joined the special. In March 2022, it was announced there would be more Celebrity specials in the future. In September 2023, it was announced that a second Celebrity Gogglebox special had been commissioned to air in the week following the eighteenth series' finale, on 25 October on Lifestyle and on 26 October 2023 on Network 10. On 15 October 2023, the celebrities participating in the second special were announced.

On 25 July 2022, it was announced cast member Di Kershaw had died after a short illness. In November 2024, Foxtel announced it would end its association with the show, with Network 10 airing the program exclusively from 2025.

In July 2025, it was announced that former cast member Emmie Silbery has passed away, aged 96, following a battle with dementia.

== Cast ==
=== Current ===
Viewers	Duration	About (Information)
Symon and Adam	Season 1–10, 14–	Best mates and larrikins, the physiotherapy students met on a university pub crawl in Melbourne. In the season 3 premiere, it was announced Symon and Adam had graduated from university and begun their careers. Symon and Adam decided to quit the show at the end of season 10 but returned to the show in season 14.
Anastasia and Faye	Season 1–	Both born in Melbourne to Greek parents.
The Dalton family	Season 1–	Parents Matt and Kate, and their two daughters Holly and Millie, who live in Toorak, an inner suburb of Melbourne.
Keith and Lee	Season 1–	With two grown-up children, the pair have celebrated 30 years of marriage and live in an outer-northern suburb of Melbourne.
Matty, Sarah Marie and Jad	Season 6–	Lebanese Australians Matty, his wife Sarah Marie, and best friend Jad are from Sydney. Matty is the brother of Dubai-based radio star Kris Fade. They have been joined intermittently by their sons Malik and Lyon, since 2020 and 2023 respectively. In 2023 and 2024, Sarah Marie was absent from the majority of seasons 17 to 20, due to being on maternal leave.
Tim and Leanne	Season 9–	Tim and Leanne are siblings from Melbourne.
Milo and Nic	Season 11–	Best mates and flatmates, Milo and Nic met whilst working in a retail surf store over a decade ago on the Gold Coast.
The Delpechitra family	Season 1–13, 15–	Parents Patrick and Tracey, sons Wendel and Ethan, and daughter Vestal. Patrick and Tracey moved from Sri Lanka to Australia 25 years ago and live in Sydney's west. The Delpechitra family did not appear in season 14 due to COVID-19 restrictions in Sydney but returned in season 15.
Kevin, Bob, Mia & Jared	Season 16–	First Nations Brisbane based family, partners Bob and Kevin and their friends from university Mia and Jared. They have been joined intermittently by Mia's daughter Malaya since 2025.
Mia, Bree & Lainey	Season 19–	Mia and Bree are sisters with best friend Lainey, from the Shire in southern Sydney.

=== Former ===
Viewers	Duration	About (Information)
The Silbery family	Season 3–20	Three generations of women – great grandma Emily Milligan, mum Kerry, and daughter Isabelle – based in Melbourne. Emily stepped down from the series in 2023, since the premiere of season 17, after being diagnosed with dementia and moving to an aged care home. Kerry and Isabelle were joined intermittently by Izzy's daughter Ruby during their final season in 2024. Emily died on 8 July 2025 and the season 22 premiere was dedicated to her.
Mick and Di	Season 1–15	Indigenous art dealers who have been married for nearly 50 years, live in inner-city Sydney. Di died on 22 July 2022 and the season 16 premiere was dedicated to her.
Kaday and Chantel	Season 11–14	Kaday and Chantel met while hanging washing in their shared Sydney Eastern suburbs apartment building. Kaday and Chantel chose not to return to season 15.
The Elias Family	Season 11–13	Parents Les and Danielle, eldest son Jacob, daughter Lily-Rose and youngest daughter Ivy are from the suburbs of Sydney. The Elias family did not appear in season 14 due to COVID-19 restrictions in Sydney and chose not to return for season 15.
The Jackson family	Season 1–10	Parents Stacey and Grant and their six children Corey, Britney, Jesse, Chase, Kane and Nate from Penrith, in western Sydney.
Angie and Yvie	Season 1–8	The Sunshine Coast housemates whose place is bustling and chaotic thanks to the small circus of dogs they foster. Angie and Yvie chose to leave the show at the end of season 8 because Angie had left their house in Sydney and couldn't travel regularly to Sydney anymore.
Wayne and Tom	Season 1–8	The Melbourne couple met at a country dance. They have raised three children together and are engaged. The couple and their dog, Satie, share the lounge together every night. In the season 2 premiere, it was revealed that Satie had died. Wayne and Tom quit the series at the end of season 8.
The Kidd family	Season 1–2	Parents Stuart and Janet, son Michael, his wife Elena, and youngest son Roger from the Blue Mountains. They did not return for season 3 due to availability issues. Stuart died from suicide in May 2018. The season 8 premiere was dedicated to him.
Zina and Vivian	Season 3–5	Melburnian house-mates who have been friends since high school. They did not return for season 6 as Vivian had moved overseas and Zina was embarking on new adventures.

=== Cast timeline ===
Viewers	Seasons																							
Viewers	1	2	3	4	5	6	7	8	9	10	11	12	13	14	15	16	17	18	19	20	21	22	23	24
Symon Lovett & Adam Densten																							(Note: Adam & Symon were absent from Episode 3 of Season 23.)	
Anastasia Katselas & Faye Kontos				(Note: Faye was absent for episodes 1 and 2 of season 4 as she was on holiday. Anastasia was joined by her mother Angela in Faye's absence.)																			(Note: Anastasia & Faye were absent from Episode 7 of Season 23 as they were on holiday in Bali.)	
Mick & Di† Kershaw				(Note: Mick & Di was absent in Episodes 6 and 7 of Season 4 as they were on holiday in Italy.)							(Note: Mick and Di were absent from the final 5 episodes of Season 11 due to complications with Covid-19 restrictions.)													
Keith & Lee Loo		(Note: Lee & Keith were absent for episodes 4 and 5 of season 2 as they were on holiday for their 30th wedding anniversary.)												(Note: Lee & Keith were absent from Episode 3 of Season 14 because they were self-isolating due to being Covid-19 close contacts.)										
The Dalton family															(Note: The Dalton Family were absent from Episode 4 of Season 15 as they were self-isolating from Covid-19.)				(Note: Kate was absent from Episode 9 of Season 19 as she was on holiday in India.)	(Note: Kate was absent from Episodes 7–10 of Season 20 as she was on holiday in South America.)				(Note: Kate was absent from Episodes 7 and 8 of Season 24 as she was on holiday in Europe.)
The Delpechitra family																								(Note: Vestal was absent from Episodes 5–8 of Season 24 due to her honeymoon holiday in Japan; The Delpechitra family were absent from Episodes 6–7 of Season 24 as they joined Vestal in Japan to help celebrate honeymoon holiday.)
The Jackson family																								
Angie Kent & Yvie Jones						(Note: Angie & Yvie were absent from Episode 6 of Season 6 due to illness.)		(Note: Angie & Yvie were absent from Episode 5 of season 8 due to illness.)																
Wayne & Tom Walsh																								
The Kidd family																								
Zina Joy & Vivian Ly																								
The Silbery family								(Note: Emily was absent from Episode 5 of Season 8 due to illness.)			(Note: Emily was absent for the majority of Season 11 due to complications with Covid-19 restrictions.)						(Note: Since the premiere of season 17, Emily has not appeared on the series as she stepped down from the show after being diagnosed with dementia.)							
Matty Fahd, Sarah Marie & Jad Nehmetallah																(Note: Matty, Sarah Marie & Jad were absent from Episode 10 of Season 16 due to Matty having contracted an illness.)	(Note: Sarah Marie was absent for the majority of Season 17 due to having been pregnant and expecting a second child.)	(Note: Sarah Marie was absent from the majority of Seasons 18–20 as she was on maternal leave following the birth of her second child, Lyon; Matty & Jad were absent from Episode 9 of Season 18 due to illness.)			(Note: Jad was absent from Episode 2 of Season 21 due to his honeymoon holiday.)			(Note: Jad was absent from Episodes 1 and 2 of Season 24 as he was on holiday; Matty, Sarah Marie & Jad were absent from Episode 6 of Season 24 due to illness.)
Tim Lai & Leanne																				(Note: Tim & Leanne were absent from Episode 10 of Season 20.)		(Note: Tim & Leanne were absent from Episode 10 of Season 22.)		
Milo & Nic																								
Kaday & Chantel																								
The Elias family																								
Kevin Yow Yeh, Bob Smith, Mia Strasek-Barker & Jared Hutchison																			(Note: Mia was absent from seasons 19 and 20 as she was on maternal leave following the birth of her child.)		(Note: Jared was absent from Episode 3 of Season 21 as he was on holiday.)			
Mia, Bree & Lainey																					(Note: Mia, Bree & Lainey were absent from Episode 10 of Season 21 as they were on holiday.)			

=== Celebrity Gogglebox ===
This is a list of the celebrities who appeared on Celebrity Gogglebox specials.

Cast members		Series	Year
Hamish Blake and Zoë Foster Blake		Special 1	2022
Terri, Bindi and Robert Irwin		Specials 1–2	2022–2023
Dave Hughes	Holly Ife	Special 1	2022
Dave Hughes	Kate Langbroek and Tess Hughes	Special 2	2023
Julia Morris and Nazeem Hussain	—N/a	Special 1	2022
Julia Morris and Nazeem Hussain	Urzila Carlson	Special 2	2023
Matt Preston and Lachy Hulme		Special 1	2022
Alex Perry, Joh Bailey and Cheyenne Tozzi		Special 1	2022
Celia Pacquola and Luke McGregor		Special 1	2022
Dylan Alcott and Andy Allen		Specials 1–2	2022–2023
Tim Campbell and Anthony Callea		Specials 1–2	2022–2023
Carrie Bickmore and Fifi Box		Special 2	2023
Anne Edmonds and Lloyd Langford		Special 2	2023
Krissy Marsh and Nicole O'Neill		Special 2	2023
Darren Purchese and Natalie Tran		Special 2	2023

== Episodes ==
Series	Episodes	Originally released	
Series	Episodes	First released	Last released
1	10	11 February 2015	15 April 2015
2	8	30 September 2015	18 November 2015
3	8	6 April 2016	25 May 2016
4	8	24 August 2016	12 October 2016
5	8	15 February 2017	5 April 2017
6	8	4 October 2017	22 November 2017
7	10	7 February 2018	11 April 2018
8	10	29 August 2018	31 October 2018
9	11	6 February 2019	17 April 2019
10	10	14 August 2019	16 October 2019
11	10	26 February 2020	29 April 2020
12	10	26 August 2020	28 October 2020
13	10	17 February 2021	21 April 2021
14	10	8 September 2021	10 November 2021
15	Special	2 March 2022	
15	9	9 March 2022	4 May 2022
16	10	24 August 2022	26 October 2022
17	10	22 February 2023	26 April 2023
18	10	16 August 2023	18 October 2023
18	Special	25 October 2023	
19	10	21 February 2024	24 April 2024
20	10	14 August 2024	16 October 2024
21	10	20 February 2025	24 April 2025
22	10	28 August 2025	30 October 2025
22	Special	2 November 2025	
23	10	19 February 2026	23 April 2026
23	Special	30 April 2026	
24	10	23 August 2026	25 October 2026

== Awards and nominations ==
Year	Award	Category	Result	Ref.
2016	Logie Awards of 2016	Best Factual Program	Won	
2016	6th AACTA Awards	Best Light Entertainment Television Series	Nominated	
2017	Logie Awards of 2017	Best Factual Program	Won	
2017	Logie Awards of 2017	Most Outstanding Factual or Documentary Program	Nominated	
2018	Logie Awards of 2018	Most Popular Entertainment Program	Won	
2018	8th AACTA Awards	Best Entertainment Program	Nominated	
2019	Logie Awards of 2019	Most Popular Entertainment Program	Won	
2019	Logie Awards of 2019	Most Outstanding Entertainment Program	Nominated	
2019	9th AACTA Awards	Best Factual Entertainment Program	Nominated	
2020	10th AACTA Awards	Best Factual Entertainment Program	Won	
2023	Logie Awards of 2023	Most Popular Entertainment Program	Won	
2025	Logie Awards of 2025	Best Structured Reality Program	Nominated	

== Spin-off ==
On 4 November 2016, a spin-off series titled Common Sense Australia was commissioned, which similar to Gogglebox Australia is a local adaptation of a British series of the same name, and is jointly commissioned by both Foxtel and Network Ten.

The sister channel and streaming platform of the British version of the show, E4 and 4 on Demand, aired the first three series of the show.
