= Common Sense Australia =

2017 Australian reality TV series

- Genre: Reality Television
- Based on: Common Sense
- Narrated by: Jo Van Es
- Country of origin: Australia
- Original language: English
- No. of series: 1
- No. of episodes: 8

Production
- Running time: 50 minutes
- Production company: Shine Australia

Original release
- Network: LifeStyle (Pay TV); Network Ten (free-to-air)
- Release: 5 July – 23 August 2017

Common Sense Australia is an Australian adaptation of the British series of the same name and a spinoff to Gogglebox Australia. The series, which is produced by Endemol Shine Australia, is a co-production between subscription television (STV) network The LifeStyle Channel and free-to-air (FTA) network Network Ten. It aired on The LifeStyle Channel first, and then aired on Network Ten a day later.

Common Sense was commissioned in November 2016, similar to Gogglebox Australia, is a local adaptation of a British series of the same name, and is jointly commissioned by both Foxtel and Network Ten.

== Format ==
Common Sense features a cast of real people who gather the week's most talked-about news topics while in conversation with one another in their workplaces, from topics of general news and current affairs to the latest in politics, sport and popular culture.

== Cast ==
People	Ages	Information
Kathy & Nicki	45 & 31	Hairdressing mums
Lord Frank & Robert	74 & 70	Business partners
Brett & Lawrence	29 & 27	Removalists and best mates
Helen & Sarah	30 & 32	Entrepreneurs
Aileen, Jean & Ted	89, 92 & 86	Retirees
Ayden & Jake	21 & 29	Real estate agents
Mark & Neal	53 & 39	Barristers
The Yip Family	39-70	Darren, Trudi, Aileen and Matthew, potato sellers
Betty, Lois & Michelle Anne	78, 75 & 49	Lois and Michelle Anne are mother and daughter, along with their business partner Betty who are all co-owners of a bra shop
Eric & Luke	56 & 26	Butchers

== Series overview ==
Season	Episodes	Network Ten (FTA)			The Lifestyle Channel (STV)		
Season	Episodes	Timeslot	First aired	Last aired	Timeslot	First aired	Last aired
1	8	Thursday 8:30pm	6 July 2017	24 August 2017	Wednesday 7:30pm	5 July 2017	23 August 2017

== Episodes ==
No. overall	No. in season	Title	STV air date	STV viewers	FTA air date	FTA viewers
1	1	"Episode 1"	5 July 2017	56,000	6 July 2017	463,000
Topics featured:
2	2	"Episode 2"	12 July 2017	N/A	13 July 2017	342,000
Topics featured:
3	3	"Episode 3"	19 July 2017	N/A	20 July 2017	228,000
Topics featured:
4	4	"Episode 4"	26 July 2017	N/A	27 July 2017	354,000
Topics featured:
5	5	"Episode 5"	2 August 2017	N/A	3 August 2017	N/A
Topics featured:
6	6	"Episode 6"	9 August 2017	N/A	10 August 2017	N/A
Topics featured:
7	7	"Episode 7"	16 August 2017	N/A	17 August 2017	298,000
Topics featured:
8	8	"Episode 8"	23 August 2017	N/A	24 August 2017	194,000
Topics featured:
