= Old People's Home for 4 Year Olds =

- Genre: Factual; Documentary; Family
- Created by: CPL Productions
- Based on: Old People's Home for 4 Year Olds
- Starring: Sue Kurrle; Stephanie Ward; Nicola Kertanegara; Evan Kidd
- Narrated by: Annabel Crabb
- Country of origin: Australia
- Original language: English
- No. of series: 2
- No. of episodes: 10

Production
- Executive producer: Debbie Cuell
- Producers: Brooke Hulsman; Josie Mason-Campbell; Steve Bibb; Bethan Arwell-Lewis
- Editor: Julie Hanna
- Camera setup: Multiple-camera setup
- Running time: 57–60 minutes
- Production company: Endemol Shine Australia

Original release
- Network: ABC TV
- Release: 27 August 2019 – present

Old People's Home for 4 Year Olds is an Australian factual television series based on the Channel 4 British show of the same name. It premiered on the ABC and ABC iview on 27 August 2019 at 8:30 pm and shows once a week at 8:30 pm on Tuesdays.

The show follows 11 retirement home residents and 10 pre-school aged children, who spend time with each other playing games and participating in different planned and mixed activities.

It was renewed in August 2020 for a second series which premiered at 8:30 pm on 6 April 2021.

On 30 August 2022, ABC premiered a five-part series titled Old People's Home for Teenagers, where seniors aged between 74 and 93 years old, and teenagers aged between 14 and 16 years old, participate in the experience. During episode 2, after two weeks into the experiment, 76-year old senior participant James 'Jim' Tully died during filming. After a 5-day pause in filming, the episode dealt with his death and allowed the seniors and teenagers an opportunity to share in their grief of the loss of their new friend.

== Series overview ==
| Series | Episodes | Originally released | |
| Series | Episodes | First released | Last released |
|---|---|---|---|
| 1 | 5 | 27 August 2019 | 24 September 2019 |
| 2 | 5 | 4 April 2021 | 4 May 2021 |

== Ratings ==
=== Series 1 ===
| No. | Title | Air date | Overnight ratings | | Consolidated ratings | | Total viewers | Ref(s) |
| No. | Title | Air date | Viewers | Rank | Viewers | Rank | Total viewers | Ref(s) |
|---|---|---|---|---|---|---|---|---|
| 1 | Loneliness & Friendships | 27 August 2019 | 478,000 | 15 | 138,000 | 10 | 615,000 | |
| 2 | Remembrance | 3 September 2019 | 628,000 | 9 | 112,000 | 8 | 742,000 | |
| 3 | Mood & Depression | 10 September 2019 | 657,000 | 9 | 137,000 | 8 | 794,000 | |
| 4 | Confidence & Mobility | 17 September 2019 | 546,000 | 12 | 98,000 | 11 | 645,000 | |
| 5 | Impact | 24 September 2019 | 664,000 | 8 | 125,000 | 7 | 788,000 | |

=== Series 2 ===
| No. | Title | Air date | Overnight ratings | | Consolidated ratings | | Total viewers | Ref(s) |
| No. | Title | Air date | Viewers | Rank | Viewers | Rank | Total viewers | Ref(s) |
|---|---|---|---|---|---|---|---|---|
| 1 | Fragility & Friendships | 6 April 2021 | 593,000 | 8 | 151,000 | 7 | 743,000 | |
| 2 | Memory | 13 April 2021 | 546,000 | 12 | 152,000 | 7 | 696,000 | |
| 3 | Confidence | 20 April 2021 | 498,000 | 12 | 132,000 | 9 | 631,000 | |
| 4 | Mobility | 27 April 2021 | 621,000 | 10 | 148,000 | —N/a | 765,000 | |
| 5 | Impact | 4 May 2021 | 637,000 | 7 | 148,000 | —N/a | 785,000 | |

== Awards and accolades ==
| Year | Nominee | Category | Result |
|---|---|---|---|
| 2019 | Old People's Home for 4 Year Olds | AACTA Award for Best Documentary or Factual Program | Won |
| 2020 | Old People's Home for 4 Year Olds | C21 Media International Format Award for Best Factual Format | Won |
| 2020 | Old People's Home for 4 Year Olds | International Emmy Award for Best Non-Scripted Entertainment | Won |

== See also ==
- List of Australian television series
- The Secret Life of 4 Year Olds
- Kids Say the Darndest Things
- The World's Strictest Parents
- The Voice Kids Australia
