= Murder Uncovered =

Australian true-crime series

- Genre: Crime
- Narrated by: Michael Usher
- Country of origin: Australia
- Original language: English
- No. of series: 1
- No. of episodes: 5 (List of episodes)

Production
- Running time: 60-120 mins (including ads)

Original release
- Network: Seven Network
- Release: 8 February – 27 March 2017

Murder Uncovered is an Australian true-crime series that first screened on the Seven Network on 8 February 2017 hosted by Michael Usher. This investigative series reopens infamous cases of killings and crimes in Australian criminal history.

== Broadcast ==
The third episode of Murder Uncovered, titled "Two Weddings and 29 Funerals", was scheduled to be aired on 22 February 2017, but was indefinitely pulled for legal reasons. The timeslot intended for the episode was instead used to broadcast a short message by Michael Usher explaining the schedule change, followed by an episode of Bride & Prejudice. It was later rescheduled to air on 20 March, but was rescheduled again to air on Monday, 27 March. The reason for the broadcast block was reported by Fairfax Media to be due to a judge in the Victorian Supreme Court requesting the Seven Network to co-operate for fear it might prejudice jurors in the then-ongoing trial of Stephen Asling, charged with murdering Graham "The Munster" Kinniburgh in 2003.

== Episodes ==
No. Overall	No. in Season	Title	Original airdate	Duration	Australian Viewers		Nightly Rank	Ref.
No. Overall	No. in Season	Title	Original airdate	Duration	Part 1	Part 2	Nightly Rank	Ref.
1	1	David & Catherine Birnie	8 February 2017	120 minutes	957,000	799,000	#3	
2	2	Murray Hearne	15 February 2017	60 minutes	577,000		#14	
3	3	Angelika Gavare	1 March 2017	60 minutes	675,000		#10	
4	4	Leanne Holland	8 March 2017	120 minutes	656,000	662,000	#12	
5	5	Two Weddings and 29 Funerals	27 March 2017	120 minutes	693,000	549,000	#11	

== See also ==
- List of Australian television series
- Crime in Australia
