= Taronga: Who's Who in the Zoo =

Australian factual TV series

- Also known as: Secrets of the Zoo: Down Under; Inside Taronga Zoo
- Genre: Reality; Factual
- Narrated by: Naomi Watts; Virginia Gay
- Country of origin: Australia
- Original language: English
- No. of seasons: 6
- No. of episodes: 42 (list of episodes)

Production
- Executive producer: John McAvoy
- Producers: Matthew Keygan; Simon Steel
- Camera setup: Multi-camera
- Running time: 44–47 minutes
- Production company: McAvoy Media

Original release
- Network: Nine Network
- Release: 8 February 2020 – present

Taronga: Who's Who in the Zoo is an Australian factual television series which goes behind the scenes at both Taronga Zoo Sydney and Taronga Western Plains Zoo at Dubbo. It is produced by McAvoy Media and follows the 240 keepers and vets caring for 5,000 animals. The ten part series' first three seasons were narrated by actress Naomi Watts and the fourth season is narrated by Virginia Gay.

The first series of the program premiered on 8 February 2020. The series was placed on hiatus from 21 March due to special A Current Affair broadcasts focusing on the COVID-19 pandemic occupying the program's timeslot. The program returned on 20 May 2020. The second series premiered on 22 October 2021. The third season premiered on 7 October 2022. The series fourth season returned on 22 November 2023, with Virginia Gay replacing Naomi Watts as narrator. The fifth season of the series premiered on 13 November 2024. The series sixth season premiered on 4 November 2025.

== Series overview ==
Season	No. of episodes	Originally aired	
Season	No. of episodes	Series premiere	Series finale
1	10	8 February 2020	10 June 2020
2	12	22 October 2021	14 January 2022
3	10	7 October 2022	13 January 2023
4	10	22 November 2023	23 February 2024
5	10	13 November 2024	7 February 2025
6	TBA	4 November 2025	TBA

== Episodes ==
=== Season 1 (2020) ===
No.	Title	Original release date	Australian viewers
1	Kibali	8 February 2020	601,000
2	Koala Rescue	15 February 2020	451,000
3	Platypus	22 February 2020	229,000^{[a]}
4	Lemur	29 February 2020	398,000
5	Waru	7 March 2020	468,000
6	Nala	14 March 2020	507,000
7	3 Chimps	20 May 2020	444,000
8	Giraffe Move	27 May 2020	479,000
9	Fishing Cat	3 June 2020	518,000
10	Mr Hobbs	10 June 2020	442,000

=== Season 2 (2021–22) ===
No.	Title	Original release date	Australian viewers
1	Naomi's Baby	22 October 2021	390,000
2	Giraffe Migration	29 October 2021	362,000
3	Squirrel Monkey	5 November 2021	430,000
4	Bilby Release	12 November 2021	357,000
5	Hungry Hippo	19 November 2021	315,000
6	Kartika the Tiger	26 November 2021	386,000
7	Nala's Pup	3 December 2021	374,000
8	Lion Move	10 December 2021	361,000
9	Red Panda Implant	17 December 2021	339,000
10	Roo Can't Chew	31 December 2021	307,000
11	Charlie's Walk	7 January 2022	412,000
12	The Devil You Know	14 January 2022	355,000

== Notes ==
- ^{a} This episode did not air on this night in New South Wales and Queensland due to coverage of the 2020 All Stars match, and aired at a later date.
