= RBT (TV series) =

- Promotional title card
- Genre: Factual television
- Narrated by: Andrew Daddo
- Composer: Neil Sutherland
- Country of origin: Australia
- Original language: English
- No. of seasons: 21
- No. of episodes: 201

Production
- Production locations: New South Wales (2010–2018, 2024–present); South Australia (2018–2020); Victoria (2020–present)
- Running time: 22 minutes
- Production companies: Screentime (2010–2022); EndemolShine Australia (2022–present)

Original release
- Network: Nine Network
- Release: 27 June 2010 – present

RBT is an Australian factual television series that looks at the everyday workings of sobriety check points by Random Breath Testing (or RBT) police units, and is narrated by Australian actor Andrew Daddo.

The show began on the Nine Network in June 2010 and follows RBT patrols in Australia testing for alcohol and drug-affected and reckless drivers. The premiere attracted 1.32 million viewers. The second season began in February 2011, followed by a third in September 2011. RBT entered its 12th season in November 2018.

== Filming locations ==
Seasons 1 through 11 (and season 20) were filmed in New South Wales, with production switching to South Australia in season 12. Starting in mid 2020, the show is filmed in Victoria, with some unused clips from South Australia also being part of the current filming location until early 2021. Starting from 2024, the show returns filming in New South Wales, but still continues being filmed in Victoria.

== International screenings ==
The show is transmitted in the UK on Watch under the working title Booze Patrol Australia.

The show is also transmitted in South Africa on IGNITION TV.

== Episodes ==
=== Season 1 (2010) ===
No. overall	No. in season	Title	Original release date	Australian viewers
1	1	TBA	27 June 2010	1,320,000
2	2	TBA	4 July 2010	N/A
3	3	TBA	11 July 2010	N/A
4	4	TBA	18 July 2010	1,440,000
5	5	TBA	25 July 2010	N/A
6	6	TBA	1 August 2010	N/A
7	7	TBA	8 August 2010	N/A
8	8	TBA	15 August 2010	N/A
9	9	TBA	22 August 2010	N/A
10	10	TBA	29 August 2010	N/A
11	11	TBA	5 September 2010	N/A
12	12	TBA	12 September 2010	1,410,000
13	13	TBA	19 September 2010	N/A
14	14	TBA	26 September 2010	998,000

=== Season 2 (2011) ===
No. overall	No. in season	Title	Original release date	Australian viewers
15	1	TBA	3 February 2011	N/A
16	2	TBA	10 February 2011	N/A
17	3	TBA	17 February 2011	N/A
18	4	TBA	24 February 2011	N/A
19	5	TBA	3 March 2011	N/A
20	6	TBA	10 March 2011	850,000
21	7	TBA	17 March 2011	N/A
22	8	TBA	24 March 2011	N/A
23	9	TBA	31 March 2011	N/A
24	10	TBA	7 April 2011	734,000
25	11	TBA	TBA	TBD
26	12	TBA	TBA	TBD
27	13	TBA	TBA	TBD
28	14	TBA	TBA	TBD
29	14	TBA	TBA	TBD
30	15	TBA	TBA	TBD
31	16	TBA	TBA	TBD
32	17	TBA	TBA	TBD
33	18	TBA	TBA	TBD
34	19	TBA	TBA	TBD

=== Season 3 (2011–2012) ===
No. overall	No. in season	Title	Original release date	Australian viewers
30	1	"Smoking Pat"	15 February 2012	591,000
31	2	"Surprise Party"	22 February 2012	558,000
A driver, who is accompanied by her parents, heads straight through an RBT without stopping, prompting a brief police chase.
35	6	TBA	12 November 2012	725,000
36	7	TBA	19 November 2012	727,000
37	8	TBA	26 November 2012	929,000
38	9	TBA	10 December 2012	684,000
39	10	TBA	17 December 2012	686,000

=== Season 4 (2013) ===
No. overall	No. in season	Title	Original release date	Australian viewers
46	7	TBA	13 November 2013	670,000
47	8	"Cannabis Cancer Cure"	20 November 2013	747,000
48	9	TBA	27 November 2013	719,000
49	10	TBA	4 December 2013	782,000

=== Season 5 (2015) ===
No. overall	No. in season	Title	Original release date	Australian viewers
50	1	"Wrong Side Of The Road Robert"	1 April 2015	N/A
51	2	"The Runner"	8 April 2015	652,000
52	3	"Twice In One Night"	25 June 2015	321,000
53	4	"Double Hook Up"	1 July 2015	615,000
54	5	"Mystery Car"	15 July 2015	617,000
55	6	"A Night In Kings Cross"	22 July 2015	N/A
56	7	"The Neighbourhood Caper"	10 September 2015	645,000
57	8	"The Painter"	17 September 2015	542,000

=== Season 6 (2015) ===
No. overall	No. in season	Title	Original release date	Australian viewers
58	1	"Subway Fugitive"	24 September 2015	678,000
59	2	"P Plate Speeder"	1 October 2015	730,000
60	3	"BP Stakeout"	15 October 2015	795,000
61	4	"From Pub To Pizza Hut"	22 October 2015	777,000
62	5	"Orange Foot Runner"	29 October 2015	725,000
63	6	"Bathurst Blade"	5 November 2015	842,000
64	7	"P Plate Over"	12 November 2015	815,000
65	8	"Holiday Is Over"	19 November 2015	770,000

=== Season 7 (2016) ===
No. overall	No. in season	Title	Original release date	Australian viewers
66	1	"A Dangerous Combination"	3 August 2016	619,000
67	2	"Dreadlock Hippie"	10 August 2016	694,000
68	3	"Repeat Offender"	17 August 2016	732,000
69	4	"Faint Hearted"	24 August 2016	825,000
70	5	"Mum Was Right"	24 August 2016	825,000
71	6	"Tradie in Trouble"	8 September 2016	641,000
72	7	"Lessons Learned"	15 September 2016	711,000
73	8	"Brekkie in Bed"	22 September 2016	756,000

=== Season 8 (2016) ===
No. overall	No. in season	Title	Original release date	Australian viewers
74	1	"Carpenter at Wedding"	30 September 2016	N/A
75	2	"Mardi Gras P-Plater"	6 October 2016	N/A
76	3	"Victor Akali"	13 October 2016	N/A
77	4	"Cricket Not Out"	13 October 2016	N/A
78	5	"Off The Hook"	14 November 2016	744,000
79	6	"Lovely Soul"	21 November 2016	759,000
80	7	"Sorry Mum"	5 December 2016	736,000
81	8	"Luck of the Irish"	12 December 2016	720,000

=== Season 9 (2017) ===
No. overall	No. in season	Title	Original release date	Australian viewers
82	1	"Lumberjack"	2 February 2017	603,000
83	2	"Take Me In"	9 February 2017	618,000
84	3	"Gentle Giant"	16 February 2017	626,000
85	4	"Parole Buster"	16 February 2017	626,000
86	5	"Barina Blues"	23 February 2017	625,000
87	6	"She Loves Me Not"	23 February 2017	625,000
88	7	"Don't Drink and Drive"	2 March 2017 (Note: Except NSW & QLD)	284,000
89	8	"To Be Sure"	9 March 2017	276,000
90	9	"Don't Pass Go"	16 March 2017	N/A
91	10	"No Fines"	23 March 2017	257,000
92	11	"Crying Husband"	23 March 2017	257,000

=== Season 10 (2017) ===
No. overall	No. in season	Title	Original release date	Australian viewers
93	1	"The Carer"	30 March 2017	309,000
94	2	"Birthday Present"	6 April 2017	N/A
95	3	"Stitched Up"	27 April 2017	353,000
96	4	"Woodstock"	4 May 2017	662,000
97	5	"Spiked Drink"	11 May 2017	271,000
98	6	"Pig Hunter"	18 May 2017	290,000
99	7	"Uteless"	25 May 2017	532,000
100	8	"Ice Queen"	1 June 2017	584,000
101	9	"Elliot's Brother"	10 August 2017	362,000
102	10	"Unlucky Thirteen"	17 August 2017	323,000

=== Season 11 (2018) ===
No. overall	No. in season	Title	Original release date	Australian viewers
103	1	"Meat Tray"	15 February 2018	471,000
104	2	"Boss's Fault"	22 February 2018	545,000
105	3	"Banana Wine"	1 March 2018	468,000
106	4	"Chicken Catcher"	8 March 2018	560,000
107	5	"Designated Driver"	17 May 2018	N/A
108	6	"Speedy Chef"	24 May 2018	N/A
109	7	"Lucky Unlucky"	31 May 2018	N/A
110	8	"Merry Widower"	7 June 2018	559,000
111	9	"Sleepy Driver"	14 June 2018	N/A
112	10	"Clean & Serene"	21 June 2018	540,000

=== Season 12 (2018–2019) ===
No. overall	No. in season	Title	Original release date	Australian viewers
113	1	"Tattoo You"	18 November 2018	554,000
114	2	"Close Shave"	25 November 2018	507,000
115	3	"Lucky Escape"	21 March 2019	171,000
116	4	"Footy Regret"	28 March 2019	197,000
117	5	"Fountain of Youth"	10 April 2019	243,000
118	6	"Essendon Tragic"	2 May 2019	223,000
119	7	"Mini Moke Blokes"	9 May 2019	275,000
120	8	"Child Seat"	16 May 2019	233,000
121	9	"Green Machine"	23 May 2019	258,000
122	10	"V8 Dreaming"	30 May 2019	235,000

=== Season 13 (2019–2020) ===
No. overall	No. in season	Title	Original release date	Australian viewers
123	1	"Lucky Skipper"	6 June 2019	516,000
124	2	"Baby Shower"	13 June 2019	170,000
125	3	"Her Big Surprise"	20 June 2019	454,000
126	4	"Sack Your Hairdresser"	27 June 2019	178,000
127	5	"Hungry P-Plater"	11 November 2019	472,000
128	6	"Werewolf"	18 November 2019	548,000
129	7	"Man With A Van"	25 November 2019	544,000
130	8	"Last Glass Of Wine"	2 December 2019	511,000
131	9	"Don't Trust Your Friends"	13 February 2020	442,000
132	10	"Surprise"	20 February 2020	428,000

=== Season 14 (2020) ===
No. overall	No. in season	Title	Original release date	Australian viewers
133	1	"Almond Shotgun"	27 February 2020	411,000
134	2	"Fireworks"	5 March 2020	437,000
135	3	"No Lights"	12 March 2020	194,000
136	4	"Carton"	19 March 2020	204,000
137	5	"Donut Family"	26 March 2020	545,000
138	6	"Sparkly Face"	2 April 2020	599,000
139	7	"Best Friends"	6 April 2020	510,000
140	8	"Wake Up"	13 April 2020	422,000
141	9	"Hard Done By"	23 April 2020	534,000
142	10	"Early Knock Off"	8 July 2020	544,000

=== Season 15 (2020) ===
No. overall	No. in season	Title	Original release date	Australian viewers
143	1	"Caught in the Net"	15 July 2020	534,000
144	2	"Kiwi Stubby"	22 July 2020	560,000
145	3	"No Cakes Today"	29 July 2020	578,000
146	4	"Interstate Regret"	5 August 2020	311,000
147	5	"New Years Mistake"	5 October 2020	396,000
148	6	"Festival Girls"	12 October 2020	386,000
149	7	"Melton's Finest"	19 October 2020	365,000
150	8	"Long Day"	26 October 2020	365,000
151	9	"Very Close"	17 November 2020	440,000
152	10	"Country Pills"	29 November 2020	391,000

=== Season 16 (2021) ===
No. overall	No. in season	Title	Original release date	Australian viewers
153	1	"Conspiracy Theory"	25 January 2021	270,000
154	2	"Hippy Bus"	27 May 2021	206,000
155	3	"Father's Regret"	3 June 2021	235,000
156	4	"Regret"	10 June 2021	416,000
157	5	"Date Night"	29 July 2021	185,000
158	6	"New Year's Bad Luck"	9 September 2021	463,000
159	7	"Chicken Man"	16 September 2021	519,000
160	8	"Yes Sir"	23 September 2021	484,000
161	9	"Caught Carer"	30 September 2021	512,000
162	10	"Spitting Chippie"	22 November 2021	468,000

=== Season 17 (2022) ===
No. overall	No. in season	Title	Original release date	Australian viewers
163	1	"Double Speed"	10 February 2022	451,000
164	2	"Clean Slate"	17 February 2022	459,000
165	3	"What a Doobie"	24 February 2022	447,000
166	4	"Negative Mrs"	3 March 2022	438,000
167	5	"Slow Learner"	8 September 2022	455,000
168	6	"Left High & Dry"	29 September 2022	420,000
169	7	"Bad Boss"	13 October 2022	380,000
170	8	"Fun on the Run"	20 October 2022	405,000
171	9	"Worthy Impound"	27 October 2022	402,000

=== Season 18 (2023) ===
No. overall	No. in season	Title	Original release date	Australian viewers
172	1	"Tassie Regret"	9 February 2023	412,000
173	2	"Should Have Walked"	16 February 2023	460,000
174	3	"Clutching Her Pearls"	23 February 2023	469,000
175	4	"Taking It Easy"	19 October 2023	374,000
176	5	"Home Made Booze"	26 October 2023	440,000
177	6	"Speeding Street Kid"	2 November 2023	389,000
178	7	"Two Brothers"	9 November 2023	392,000
179	8	"Train Wreck"	23 November 2023	414,000
180	9	"Please Forgive Me"	30 November 2023	427,000

=== Season 19 (2024) ===
No. overall	No. in season	Title	Original release date	Australian viewers
181	1	"The Gambler"	8 February 2024	638,000
182	2	"The Rockstar"	15 February 2024	633,000
183	3	"Esoteric Festival"	22 February 2024	703,000
184	4	"My Dream"	29 February 2024	582,000
185	5	"It Was Yesterday"	1 May 2024	N/A
186	6	"Alcohol Of Course"	8 May 2024	N/A
187	7	"Passed In Not Passed Out"	15 May 2024	N/A
188	8	"My Own Stupidity"	19 June 2024	N/A
189	9	"One Puff Poison"	18 July 2024	N/A
190	10	"Cowboy Lady Panic"	17 October 2024	N/A
191	11	"Red Eye Stoner"	24 October 2024	N/A

=== Season 20 (2024-2025) ===
No. overall	No. in season	Title	Original release date	Australian viewers
192	1	"COVID Research"	11 November 2024	N/A
193	2	"One Too Many"	18 November 2024	N/A
194	3	"Bad Karma"	25 November 2024	N/A
195	4	"Back to Jail"	6 February 2025	N/A
196	5	"Chicken Run"	13 February 2025	N/A
197	6	"Totally Ace"	20 February 2025	N/A
198	7	"Stung by a Stinger"	13 April 2025	N/A
199	8	"Livelihood Lost"	20 April 2025	N/A
200	9	"Stressed For Nothing"	4 June 2025	N/A
201	10	"Mr Two Slabs"	16 July 2025	N/A

=== Season 21 (2026) ===
No. overall	No. in season	Title	Original release date	Australian viewers
202	1	"Standards & Limits"	26 February 2026	N/A
203	2	"Calculated Risk"	15 October 2026	N/A
204	3	"Bakery Fight"	22 October 2026	TBD
205	4	"Second Hand Smoke"	29 October 2026	TBD
206	5	"Leave a Message"	5 November 2026	TBD
207	6	"Pretty Little Penny"	12 November 2026	TBD
208	7	"Not Old and Silly"	19 November 2026	TBD
