= Seven Year Switch =

- Also known as: The Super Switch
- Genre: Reality Series
- Presented by: Jo Lamble; Peter Charleston
- Country of origin: Australia
- Original language: English
- No. of series: 3
- No. of episodes: 33

Production
- Running time: 60-90 minutes

Original release
- Network: Seven Network
- Release: 15 March 2016 – 18 September 2019

Seven Year Switch is an Australian reality-television series based on the 2015–2018 American series of the same name. The series aired on the Seven Network, starting on 15 March 2016. The show featured four married couples whose relationships are in turmoil. The married people are matched with a person from one of the other couples and live together for 14 days, during which time there are no rules. At the end of the 14 days each of the couples reunite and make the decision to either part ways or reaffirm their commitment.

The series was renewed in August 2016, with the second season debuting on 17 April 2017.

In 2019 the Seven Network announced a reboot of the series called The Super Switch.

== Season 1 (2016) ==
=== Couples ===
Married Couple		Compatible Person	Relationship Decision
1	Brad	Jackie	Staying Together (later divorced)
1	Tallena	Tim	Staying Together (later divorced)
2	Tim	Tallena	Staying Together
2	Jackie	Brad	Staying Together
3	Ryan	Michelle	Staying Together (later separated)
3	Cassie	Jason	Staying Together (later separated)
4	Jason	Cassie	Separate
4	Michelle	Ryan	Separate

==== Brad & Tallena ====
Brisbane couple Brad and Tallena met on Tinder. They were supposed to get married in February but postponed it because of time, stress, and money. Now the wedding’s back on, but they need to make things right before the big day. After the show the couple married and then divorced.

==== Tim & Jackie ====
These Brisbane fitness trainers met at the gym. They hooked up after work one night over a few drinks and their relationship started from there, but it seems that’s where the intimacy in their relationship began and ended. Their lack of any kind of romance is the number one issue for Jackie, followed by the resentment that’s building from running their fitness business from their home. After the show, Jackie got pregnant with their son, and the couple remain together as of October 2018. They have since welcomed a baby girl as well.

==== Ryan & Cassie ====
Cassie has 2 daughters: 11-month-old Emmerson with Ryan and nine-year-old Ramani from a previous relationship, though her biggest child is Ryan himself. Cassie is sick of dealing with a man-child. Cassie wants to reignite the passion she once had with Ryan. Ryan and Cassie had another baby girl, Mena, on 14 June 2016. After the show the couple remained together until mid-2017, when they separated.

==== Jason & Michelle ====
This Gold Coast couple has been together for seven years and have a four-year-old son and an eight-month-old daughter together. While Michelle is focused on being a good mum, Jason spends all his time establishing his motorbike business during the day and doing web design at night to make extra cash for his family. Michelle wants more affection from Jason. The couple announced they had split in the reunion episode.

=== Ratings ===
No.	Title	Air date	Timeslot	Overnight ratings		Consolidated ratings		Total viewers	Ref(s)
No.	Title	Air date	Timeslot	Viewers	Rank	Viewers	Rank	Total viewers	Ref(s)
1	Episode 1	15 March 2016	Tuesday 9pm	858,000	7	99,000	4	957,000	
2	Episode 2	22 March 2016	Tuesday 9pm	760,000	8	113,000	6	873,000	
3	Episode 3	29 March 2016	Tuesday 9pm	826,000	9	149,000	6	975,000	
4	Episode 4	5 April 2016	Tuesday 9pm	772,000	9	155,000	7	927,000	
5	Episode 5	19 April 2016	Tuesday 9pm	925,000	6	163,000	3	1,088,000	
6	Episode 6	26 April 2016	Tuesday 9:30pm	789,000	10	215,000	7	1,004,000	
7	Episode 7	3 May 2016	Tuesday 8:40pm	820,000	10	159,000	8	979,000	
8	Episode 8	10 May 2016	Tuesday 8:50pm	849,000	8	160,000	7	1,008,000	
9	Episode 9	17 May 2016	Tuesday 8:50pm	903,000	6	113,000	5	1,037,000	
10	Reunion	23 May 2016	Monday 8:50pm	785,000	11	137,000	8	922,000	

== Season 2 (2017) ==
A second season was announced in August 2016, and premiered on 17 April 2017.

=== Couples ===
Married Couple		Compatible Person	Relationship Decision
1	Johnny	Stacey Louise	Staying together
1	Tracey	Sarge	Staying together
2	Sarge	Tracey	Separate
2	Stacey Louise	Johnny	Separate
3	Michael	Kaitlyn	Staying together
3	Felicity	Mark	Staying together
4	Mark	Felicity	Staying together
4	Kaitlyn	Michael	Staying together

=== Ratings ===
No.	Title	Air date	Timeslot	Overnight ratings		Consolidated ratings		Total viewers	Ref(s)
No.	Title	Air date	Timeslot	Viewers	Rank	Viewers	Rank	Total viewers	Ref(s)
1	Episode 1	17 April 2017	Monday 9pm	618,000	11	74,000	10	692,000	
2	Episode 2	18 April 2017	Tuesday 9pm	627,000	10	73,000	10	700,000	
3	Episode 3	24 April 2017	Monday 9pm	493,000	16	74,000	14	567,000	
4	Episode 4	25 April 2017	Tuesday 9pm	551,000	14	64,000	13	615,000	
5	Episode 5	1 May 2017	Monday 9pm	465,000	—N/a	65,000	19	530,000	
6	Episode 6	8 May 2017	Monday 8:40pm	484,000	—N/a	54,000	20	538,000	
7	Episode 7	9 May 2017	Tuesday 8:40pm	507,000	18	56,000	15	563,000	
8	Episode 8	15 May 2017	Monday 8:40pm	519,000	20	52,000	19	571,000	
9	Episode 9	16 May 2017	Tuesday 8:40pm	529,000	16	72,000	15	601,000	
10	Episode 10	22 May 2017	Monday 8:40pm	609,000	15	76,000	13	685,000	
11	Episode 11	23 May 2017	Tuesday 8:40pm	600,000	14	63,000	14	663,000	
12	Episode 12	29 May 2017	Monday 8:40pm	660,000	13	72,000	12	732,000	
13	Episode 13	30 May 2017	Tuesday 8:40pm	649,000	12	63,000	11	712,000	

== Other versions ==
- American version by Kinetic Content in 2015 for FYI, moved to Lifetime for Season 3
- British version by 7 Wonder Productions in 2018 for Channel 4

== The Super Switch ==
The Super Switch is a spin-off series which aired on the Seven Network in 2019. The series premiered on 11 June June 2019 on Channel 7 and 7plus.

The series format was slightly changed: six couples still swapped partners, however three of each swapped couple were divided into two separate mansions.

=== Couples ===
Original Couple		Compatible Person	Relationship Decision
1	Ben	Olga	Staying together
1	Christie	Tyler	Staying together
2	Tyler	Christie	Staying together
2	Olga	Ben	Staying together
3	Kendrick	Aimee	Staying together
3	Romina	Marcus	Staying together
4	Marcus	Romina	Staying together
4	Aimee	Kendrick	Staying together
5	Lachlan	Neesha	Staying together
5	Miranda	Justin	Staying together
6	Justin	Miranda	Staying together
6	Neesha	Lachlan	Staying together
