= Bride & Prejudice (TV series) =

Australian reality dating television show

- Genre: Reality
- Based on: American version of Bride & Prejudice
- Country of origin: Australia
- Original language: English
- No. of seasons: 2
- No. of episodes: 20

Production
- Running time: 60 minutes

Original release
- Network: Seven Network
- Release: 30 January 2017 – 28 November 2018

Bride & Prejudice (also known as Bride & Prejudice: The Forbidden Weddings) is an Australian reality dating television show which premiered on the Seven Network on 30 January 2017. The series is an adaptation of an American program of the same name which aired for one season in 2016 on FYI, until the program got a second season on Lifetime in 2020. The program follows couples planning to wed, but whose family disapprove of their relationship.

A second season premiered on 29 October 2018 with six new couples. During the second season, a casting call was made for new couples with a third season confirmed for 2019.

A 5-episode British version began broadcasting on Channel 4 on 5 June 2018.

== Production ==
Seven put out a casting call in June 2016 seeking couples in diverse, multicultural or progressive relationships. At the network's upfronts in October 2016, the network announced a "controversial new show" which was still filming at the time, whose format was being kept under wraps because disclosing details and the title of the program could affect participants. It was confirmed in December 2016 that the program was Bride & Prejudice.

== Broadcast ==
=== American series ===
The original series began airing on 15 March 2016 on FYI. Like Married at First Sight with its fifth season, the series moved to Lifetime for its second season under the name Bride & Prejudice: Forbidden Love, and premiered on 26 February 2020.

=== Australian series ===
The series began airing at 9:00 pm on 30 January 2017. Episode 5 aired out of timeslot on Wednesday, 22 February 2017 as a late replacement due to an episode of Murder Uncovered being pulled from its regular timeslot for legal reasons. The second season debuted on 29 October 2018 and aired two further episodes in the following two days.

== Deceased stars ==
- Micah Downey died suddenly on 28 December 2019 at aged 26. The cause of death was down to an overdose of a mix of illegal prescription drugs.
- James Ciseau killed in a car crash in Queensland, Australia on 29 November 2021.
- Tori Ciseau died by suicide just one year after the death of her husband, James.

== Ratings ==
=== Season 1 (2017) ===
No.	Title	Air date	Overnight ratings		Consolidated ratings		Total viewers	Ref(s)
No.	Title	Air date	Viewers	Rank	Viewers	Rank	Total viewers	Ref(s)
1	Episode 1	30 January 2017	874,000	8	52,000	8	927,000	
2	Episode 2	6 February 2017	764,000	10	64,000	8	828,000	
3	Episode 3	13 February 2017	636,000	10	92,000	11	727,000	
4	Episode 4	20 February 2017	731,000	11	80,000	10	811,000	
5	Episode 5	22 February 2017	712,000	8	68,000	7	780,000	
6	Episode 6	27 February 2017	714,000	11	75,000	10	789,000	
7	Episode 7	6 March 2017	700,000	11	73,000	8	773,000	
8	Episode 8	13 March 2017	708,000	12	84,000	10	792,000	

=== Season 2 (2018) ===
No.	Title	Air date	Timeslot	Overnight ratings		Consolidated ratings		Total viewers	Ref(s)
No.	Title	Air date	Timeslot	Viewers	Rank	Viewers	Rank	Total viewers	Ref(s)
1	Episode 1	29 October 2018	Monday 7:30pm	633,000	12	51,000	12	684,000	
2	Episode 2	30 October 2018	Tuesday 7:30pm	583,000	10	50,000	10	634,000	
3	Episode 3	31 October 2018	Wednesday 7:30pm	525,000	13	57,000	14	582,000	
4	Episode 4	5 November 2018	Monday 7:30pm	629,000	7	65,000	7	694,000	
5	Episode 5	6 November 2018	Tuesday 7:30pm	744,000	8	56,000	9	800,000	
6	Episode 6	7 November 2018	Wednesday 7:30pm	583,000	12	69,000	10	653,000	
7	Episode 7	12 November 2018	Monday 7:30pm	668,000	11	57,000	9	725,000	
8	Episode 8	13 November 2018	Tuesday 7:30pm	653,000	7	57,000	6	710,000	
9	Episode 9	14 November 2018	Wednesday 7:30pm	623,000	9	60,000	8	682,000	
10	Episode 10	19 November 2018	Monday 7:30pm	687,000	8	64,000	7	751,000	
11	Episode 11	20 November 2018	Tuesday 7:30pm	711,000	6	58,000	6	769,000	
12	Episode 12	26 November 2018	Monday 7:30pm	699,000	6	55,000	6	754,000	
