= Aussie Shore =

Australian reality television series

- Genre: Reality
- Created by: Paramount
- Country of origin: Australia
- Original language: English
- No. of seasons: 3
- No. of episodes: 22

Production
- Production locations: Cairns (Screen Queensland Studios); Gold Coast
- Production company: Paramount Television Studios

Original release
- Network: Paramount+
- Release: October 3, 2024 – present

Related
- Shore franchise Geordie Shore; Love Island Australia

Aussie Shore is an Australian reality television series that premiered on October 3, 2024, on Paramount+. It is the first Australian branch of the American show Jersey Shore. The show follows the daily lives of twelve housemates who live together for several weeks in Cairns, Queensland.

== Production ==
In February 2022, Paramount Global announced a new line of unscripted series and renewals for MTV Entertainment Studios that included seven new versions of the Shore franchise.

In October 2023, the show was first announced under the name "Aussie Shore", confirming its launch sometime in 2024.

Charlotte Crosby is credited as the "boss" of the team and, therefore, makes recurring appearances on the show. Starting with the third season, Cosby is replaced by Tammy Hembrow.

== Overview ==
=== Season 1 ===
The first season premiered on October 3, 2024. Prior to the premiere on August 11, 2024, the first cast member, Callum Hole, star of Love Island Australia and I'm a Celebrity...Get Me Out of Here! Australia, was announced. The remaining cast members were announced on August 29, 2024. The season was filmed between May and June 2024 in Cairns, Queensland. Gabby Vandenbergh left the series for personal reasons after the second episode. Nardos last appeared in the seventh episode; in the eighth, Charlotte Crosby announced she would not be returning to the series.

=== Season 2 ===
In February 2025 the show was renewed for a second season, which premiered on September 25, 2025. The season was filmed between May and June, on location. Thomas Tuck didn't return after the first season. It includes three new cast members: Rihanna and italian australians Francesco and Lachie. Cooper Black decided to leave the show for personal reasons, while Callum Hole joined the rest of the cast at some parties.

=== Season 3 ===
The third season premiered on October 22, 2026. In November 2025, the renewal of the program for a third season was announced. The filming took place at a residence on Gold Coast. Kyle Tierney, Lachie Di Sebastiano, Lily Stephenson, and Rhiana Pearson did not return for this season; instead, they were replaced by new cast members: Amber, Keelie, Marto, Roxy, and Taine.

== Cast ==
=== Current cast ===
Participants	Age (Note: Ages reflect at the time of filming.)	Hometown	Description (Note: From the second season onwards, the cast and their respective descriptions were no longer presented in the show's introduction.)	Season
Callum Hole (Note: In the second season, Callum Hole only appeared in episode 2 during a boat party, and in episode 9 during the final party at the house.)	25	Gold Coast	"Your boys is the Rizzonator" (1)	1–
Catia Sinigaglia	23	Melbourne	"I've got the rig out and I'm ready to launch" (1)	1–
Con Mourmourakis	27	Wollongong	"Step on my toes, I'll stomp on yours" (1)	1–
Jaeda Chamberlain	22	Sydney	"I do use my tits to an advantage" (1)	1–
Lexie Dyer	23	Gold Coast	"I came out of my mum's vagina having a party" (1)	1–
Manaaki Hoepo	22	Melbourne	"I'm a little bit of a shit-stirrer" (1)	1–
Francesco Caricato	21	Brisbane	—N/a	2–
Amber Christie			—N/a	3–
Taine Hauparoa			—N/a	3–
Marto			—N/a	3–
Keelie Hubbard			—N/a	3–
Roxy			—N/a	3–

=== Former cast ===
Participants	Age	Hometown	Description	Season
Kyle Tierney	25	Brisbane	"Everyone needs a Kyle in their life" (1)	1–2
Lily Stephenson	21	Cairns	"I'm the queen cuz I'm the hottest in Cairns" (1)	1–2
Cooper Black	27	Gold Coast	"Turn up that music and watch me dance" (1)	1–2
Gabby Vandenbergh	22	Adelaide	"I'm just doing shit I wanna do"	1
Nardos Feleke	25	Perth	"My dream job is no job"	1
Thomas "Tom" Tuck	24	Melbourne	"I'm a little bit of a sly fox"	1
Lachie Di Sebastiano	26	Melbourne	—N/a	2
Rhiana Pearson	23	Victoria	—N/a	2

==== Duration of cast ====
Current cast members
Cast member	Series 1										Series 2										Series 3									
Cast member	1	2	3	4	5	6	7	8	9	10	1	2	3	4	5	6	7	8	9	10	1	2	3	4	5	6	7	8	9	10
Catia																														
Con																														
Manaaki																														
Jaeda																														
Lexie																														
Callum																														
Francesco																														
Amber																														
Taine																														
Marto																														
Keelie																														
Roxy																														
Former cast members
Gabby																														
Nardos																														
Tom																														
Kyle																														
Lily																														
Cooper																														
Rhiana																														
Lachie																														

- = Cast member is featured in this episode.
- = Cast member arrives in the house.
- = Cast member voluntarily leaves the house.
- = Cast member leaves and returns to the house in the same episode.
- = Cast member joins the series, but leaves the same episode.
- = Cast member returns to the house.
- = Cast member features in this episode, but outside of the house.
- = Cast member does not feature in this episode.
- = Cast member leaves the series.
- = Cast member returns to the series.
- = Cast member is removed from the series.
- = Cast member features in this episode despite not being an official cast member at the time.
- = Cast member returns to the series, but leaves same episode.

== Other appearances ==
As well as appearing on Aussie Shore, some of the cast members have also competed on other reality television shows.

- The Traitors Australia
  - Manaaki Hoepo – Season 3 (2026) – 4th evicted

== Episodes ==
=== Series overview ===
Series	Episodes	Originally released	
Series	Episodes	First released	Last released
1	10	3 October 2024	28 November 2024
2	10	25 September 2025	19 November 2025
3	TBA	22 October 2026	TBA

=== Season 1 (2024) ===
No. overall	No. in season	Title	Original release date
1	1	"Ready to Launch"	October 3, 2024
2	2	"I'm Back Bitches"	October 3, 2024
3	3	"Banana Humping"	October 10, 2024
4	4	"Something in the Air"	October 17, 2024
5	5	"Truth or Dare"	October 24, 2024
6	6	"Goon Sack"	October 31, 2024
7	7	"The Ick"	November 7, 2024
8	8	"Bad Bitch Birthday Behaviour"	November 14, 2024
9	9	"Boat Party from Hell"	November 21, 2024
10	10	"Out with a Bang"	November 28, 2024

=== Season 2 (2025) ===
No. overall	No. in season	Title	Original release date
11	1	"I Live in Brisbane"	September 25, 2025
12	2	"10 Kebabs"	September 25, 2025
13	3	"Mud In My Box"	October 2, 2025
14	4	"Dap Me Up"	October 9, 2025
15	5	"Too Much Tongue"	October 16, 2025
16	6	"It’s A Set-Up"	October 23, 2025
17	7	"Emergency Meeting"	October 30, 2025
18	8	"People Call Me Bubbles"	November 6, 2025
19	9	"Hobbled In Hot"	November 13, 2025
20	10	"I'm A Shark"	November 20, 2025

=== Season 3 (2026) ===
No. overall	No. in season	Title	Original release date
21	1	"Welsh Nut Custard"	October 22, 2026
22	2	"I Do Facials"	October 22, 2026
23	3	"Suit With No Shirt"	October 29, 2026
24	4	"Extra Sauce"	November 5, 2026
25	5	"I Forgot Undies"	November 12, 2026
26	6	TBA	November 19, 2026
27	7	TBA	November 26, 2026
28	8	TBA	December 3, 2026
29	9	TBA	December 10, 2026
30	10	TBA	December 17, 2026
