= Tipping Point Australia =

Australian television quiz show

- Genre: Quiz show
- Based on: Tipping Point by: Hugh Rycroft; Matthew Boulby; Richard Osman
- Presented by: Todd Woodbridge
- Theme music composer: Marc Sylvan
- Original language: English
- No. of seasons: 3
- No. of episodes: 500+

Production
- Producers: Owen Matthews; Elliot J. Spencer; Amelia Fisk; Miles Reeves; Becky Taylor
- Production location: Docklands Studios Melbourne, Docklands, Victoria
- Running time: 60 minutes (inc. adverts)
- Production company: Endemol Shine Australia

Original release
- Network: Nine Network
- Release: 29 January 2024 – present

Tipping Point Australia is an Australian game show which has aired on the Nine Network since 29 January 2024. The show is presented by Todd Woodbridge, and features three contestants answering questions about general knowledge in order to win counters on a large coin pusher arcade machine to try to win money and prizes. It replaced Millionaire Hot Seat, which had aired on the Nine Network between 2009 and 2023.

== Games ==
=== Bank Builder ===
The show begins with the first of four rounds, the Bank Builder round. Each contestant starts with three counters. The host will ask a question, then the contestants will buzz in to try to answer that question. If a contestant answers a question correctly, they are given two options; they can put a counter in the machine to try and win $100 ($300 in special edition) for each counter, or force one of their opponents to play a counter into the machine instead.

There are two "mystery counters" in the machine at the start of the game. If a contestant pushes one of these counters over the tipping point, that contestant wins a mystery prize. In addition, two "double counters" are also in the machine; if a contestant pushes one of these counters into the win zone, the value of the entire drop is doubled, or quadrupled if both double counters fall into the machine during that contestant's turn. Both the mystery and double counters are also worth $100.

Unlike the UK version, there is no penalty pot, meaning that if a contestant gives a wrong answer to a question or fails to answer that question within three seconds, they will lose a counter completely from the three they were given at the start of the round. When a contestant has no more counters, they sit it out until the next round. The last remaining contestant to have counters doesn't need to buzz in to answer questions, but still must answer correctly in order to use those counters.

=== Quickfire ===
In the Quickfire round, contestants are given 30 seconds (as opposed to 45 seconds in the UK version) to answer as many questions as they can. The amount of questions they get right are turned into counters that they can put into the machine to try and win cash. In this round, the leader at the end of the Bank Builder round decides who will play first. In the event of a tie for first place, the contestant who answered the first question correctly out of the two is given priority. The contestant with the lowest amount of money in their bank at the end of this round is eliminated.

=== Head-to-head ===
The remaining two contestants go head-to-head, with the host asking each contestant two questions each alternately (as opposed to three questions each in the UK version). Contestants may choose to answer the question themselves or pass the question to their opponent to answer. Answering a question correctly earns a counter, whereas answering incorrectly gives that counter to the opponent. In this round, the leader at the end of the Quickfire round is asked the first question. Whoever has the most money at the end of this round moves on to the final round.

If there is a tie for last place at the end of either the Quickfire round or the Head-to-Head round, the two affected contestants are asked a tiebreaker question, and the first contestant to buzz in may answer. A correct answer advances that contestant to the next round, while an incorrect answer eliminates that contestant from the game.

=== Jackpot Round ===
The contestant who has the most money at the end of the Head-to-Head round then proceeds onto the Jackpot Round for the chance to win the $20,000 jackpot. The winning contestant chooses a drop zone to place the jackpot counter into, before dropping it into the machine. From this point until the end of the last question, all counters that fall into the win zone are still worth $100 and are all counted towards the contestant's winnings, regardless of whenever or wherever they fall. The mystery and double counters are still in effect.

The contestant is then presented with five question categories (as opposed to six in the UK version), which can be played in any order. All questions have three choices and contestants are given the option of playing for one, two or three counters, with the question difficulty being increased with the amount of counters played for. If the contestant answers the question correctly, they are awarded the amount of counters played for and drop them into the machine to attempt to push the jackpot counter over the tipping point into the win zone to win the $20,000 jackpot. If the contestant answers the question incorrectly, they then move onto another category (if any remain).

==== Jackpot Temptation ====
Once all question categories have been exhausted, and if the jackpot counter remains in the machine, "Jackpot Temptation" is played, where the host will attempt to entice the contestant to give up all the money they have accumulated so far. Unlike the UK version which has a straight trade option of three counters for the jackpot counter's original value, the contestant is given up to three temptation options, typically in the form of more counters, increasing the value of the jackpot counter itself (typically to 40,000, but occasionally a larger amount depending on the jackpot counter's position), and a family holiday or a new car. From this point on, the only counters that have any value are the jackpot counter and any remaining double (2x) counters, which are only in effect if one or both ends up falling into the win zone with the jackpot counter, which would see the value of the jackpot counter doubled or quadrupled respectively.

The winning contestant has two options; they can either take the money that they earned from the start of the game and end the game at this point, or they can risk the money they had earned to play on. If they choose to take any of the host's temptation offers, they are given the amount of counters that were offered. If they can successfully push the jackpot counter over into the win zone, they win whatever amount of money/additional prize that was offered, however if they are unsuccessful, they walk away with nothing except for any prizes they may have won during the game.

As of 3 August 2026, the most money ever won in the Jackpot round was $100,000, by 20-year-old student and sailor Anna Crispey from Melbourne, Victoria, on the 20 October 2025 episode.

== Ratings ==
Tipping Point Australia usually rates highest in its timeslot against rival game show The Chase Australia on the Seven Network, and 10 News on Network 10.

== International transmissions ==
- New Zealand – The show is available on TVNZ+ for streaming.
