= Mitre 10 Dream Home =

New Zealand reality television series

- Genre: Reality show
- Created by: David Baldock
- Directed by: John Hagen; Michael Huddleston; Myles Thomas; Liz Kruse; Leon Sefton
- Presented by: Jayne Kiely (series 1–10); Simon Barnett (series 11)
- Theme music composer: Rob Winch
- Country of origin: New Zealand
- Original language: English
- No. of series: 11
- No. of episodes: 110 (118 including Offcuts)

Production
- Executive producers: John McEwen; Tina McLaren; Gavin Wood
- Producers: Norman Elder; David Baldock
- Running time: 60 minutes (including commercials)

Original release
- Network: TV2
- Release: September 1999 – 3 September 2013

Mitre 10 Dream Home is a reality television series that screened on TV2 in New Zealand, originally presented by Jayne Kiely, with Simon Barnett presenting series 11. Two couples are challenged to show the country whether or not they are able to work well together, they turn a dilapidated house into their Dream Home. Each week, the two teams renovate a room or area of the house in the space of one weekend. Viewers vote for the room they like best, with the votes from the viewers and judges helping determine which team wins the competition. The winning team wins the Dream Home they create, and the second team have the option to purchase their Dream Home at a public auction. In 2013 the competition was changed to building a new home from scratch.

== Copyright dispute ==
The 'Dream Home' concept enjoyed success in New Zealand over a period of ten years and inspired a similar venture in Australia. In 2003 the show's creators Ninox Television Ltd and the Australian production company Nine Films & Television Pty Ltd entered into an arrangement. Consequently, Australia's Nine Network screened two series of the very successful show called The Block, though the production company failed to pay Ninox any licence fees. In 2005 Ninox Television Ltd launched legal action, alleging that the latter's TV series infringed copyright. The case progressed to the Federal Court of Australia. The court eventually ruled against Ninox, concluding that though the shows were very similar in character, "simply by reason of the fact that there are large elements of unscripted dialogue and interaction within the overall framework of the programs, there cannot be any substantial reproduction."

== The teams ==
There are two teams competing to build their Dream Home, and are known as the Blue Team and the Yellow Team (from series 11, the Orange Team and the Black Team). The team consists of the chosen couples to compete in the show. Couples with young children and that do not already own their own home are usually chosen. Each team includes their own builder to assist with the construction of the home, an architect, and a designer who not only creates the final plans for the home, but helps with the building process. Each team also has a budget advisor known as the team's Red Coat (as this person always wears a red coat), who advise the team on their spending during the project and make suggestions with any budget related matters.

=== Team selection ===
Finalist teams are chosen and the finalist teams have the task of designing their Dream Home. The design must meet certain criteria, such as being environmentally friendly and a certain size. The judges are looking for any unique design aspects that have not been seen elsewhere, such as in a magazine. The finalists present their design concept to the judges as a portfolio and a model and given their reasons why they should compete to win their Dream Home. The potential teams are told whether they become the blue or yellow team if chosen to compete in the competition. The best possible blue team and best possible yellow team chosen by the judges become the teams to compete to build their Dream Home.

== The Project ==
After the teams are chosen in the second episode, they meet with their builders, designers and architects to discuss the design for their Dream Home. The house is designed based on the design created by the couple prior to selection, but often the architects may find the design is simply not feasible and redesign the house from scratch. The teams also visit Mitre 10 and Farmers (the major sponsors of the show) to choose possible items for the house as well as building materials.

Once all the design work is complete, the original home is prepared to be remodelled into a Dream Home. The teams first demolish any parts of the original home. In the earlier series this was simply gutting out the inside of the existing home but, in later series, the teams demolished everything except a couple of original walls and the floor. Rules were changed from the 2006 series onwards, requiring at least 30% of the original wall stud to be kept. Once the home is demolished, builders build the shell of the house; putting up any frame work (and usually the roof). Teams do not play a part of this construction, and very little of it is shown. In series 11, the framework for the houses was constructed by builders and the roofing and bottom layer of the exterior cladding was installed before the teams started construction.

Each week, the teams construct a room in the house (or outside area) over a weekend. While there is some variance between each series, the following rooms are usually constructed each week:

- Week 1: Teams are chosen and house is designed by potential teams.
- Week 2: Master Bedroom
- Week 3: Bathroom (and ensuites if any)
- Week 4: Lounge/Living and Dining Area
- Week 5: Children's bedrooms (usually 2 rooms)
- Week 6: Hall way and laundry
- Week 7: Kitchen
- Week 8: Exterior of house clad and painted
- Week 9: Landscaping of gardens as well as building decks and garage
- Week 10: Final show no actual building takes place, winner announced and second house auctioned.

While much of the construction work is done by the team members, some tasks are done exclusively by qualified tradesmen for both teams. These are tasks that could not easily be done by the team members, however the costs of this must be met from the team's budget. These jobs include carpetlaying, plumbing, and electrical work, as well as the construction of the roof on the house and pavement driveway and garage.

== Competition rules ==
Rules that the teams must adhere to during the construction of their Dream Home include that:

- While teams are allowed to call in extras to assist with the building of the house, such as friends or family members, the extras must not be qualified builders or tradesmen, that is, unless they pay the builder or tradesman out of the team's budget. The exception to this rule is the team can call in a tradesman to carry out a task outside of the tradesman's field of work. For example, the team can call in a plumber to help with painting or a painter to help with plumbing.
- The teams have a certain budget to adhere to each week, which the team's Red Coat advises on. The Red Coat keeps track of spending, and reports as to whether the team underspent or overspent on their budget. If the budget exceeds the recommended amount, the team has less to spend in later rooms.
- The construction of the room is done under a certain time limit, usually from 8:00 on a Saturday morning until 17:00 on Sunday afternoon (a total of 33 hours). Often the teams work into the early hours of Sunday morning and then be back on site to continue work after sunrise. The teams must down tools and vacate the house once the time limit has been reached, whether or not the room is complete. The final minutes are often spent tidying any work for the final presentation. In some series, factors outside the show's control (e.g. rain during the exterior cladding weekend) have meant that teams have been ordered to down tools and vacate during the weekend, with time remaining made up on a later date.
- The house must adhere to certain safety aspects, such as rails on the staircases. If these aspects are not included, even if the team did not have time to add such features, then a penalty is imposed. This is usually a cash fine out of the team's budget.

== The Winner ==
Each week the three judges view the rooms constructed and judge the standard of the workmanship, design aspects, and whether the project was actually completed, looking for any possible flaws. The judges then decide which room constructed that week deserves to win, which carries a small weighting in determining the final winner. Viewers of the show also can vote for the room they liked the best by calling the shows 0900 number or by placing a vote by text message.

The final show is live and viewers are still able to place their votes for the overall project prior to the winner being announced. The winner wins the Dream Home they constructed, including all the furnishings. The second place team wins all the furnishings in the home, and also money for a deposit to enable them to purchase the house at the auction, should they hold the top bid. The auction takes place with bidding open to any members of the public attending the auction. Throughout the shows history, the second place teams have always won the house in the auction, except in series 6, where the winners did not walk away with the home on the show, due to the auction closing below reserve, but managed to settle outside the show.

== Series ==
Series 1-5 took place at the end of the year, whereas series 6-10 took place at the start. This means there was no series in 2004, although most of series 6's filming took place during that year. Series 11 took place during the middle of the year.

=== Series 1 (1999) ===
This series took place in Blenheim. The potential teams were chosen by building a mailbox with the best two mailboxes being the couples that would compete in the competition. The design of the houses were done solely by the architects but with input from the competing couples, the couples were shown the houses before they were placed on site and were given the opportunity to locate where on the section the house would be located. The houses were 1930s style bungalow houses, the interior was gutted out and exterior cladding removed but the teams built their Dream Home in the shell of the original home maintaining much of its original look, even the timber windows were kept as opposed to replacing them with modern aluminium window joinery. The house were not viewed by judges; instead, the winner was solely determined by viewer votes. Viewers could vote by calling the 0900 number (text messaging was not used by many New Zealanders at the time).

=== Series 2 (2000) ===
This series took place in Hastings. There was scant difference between the first and second series, except for the added requirement to increase the floorspace of the house by 25%. The houses were 1960s style state house.

=== Series 3 (2001) ===
This series took place in Timaru. There was scant difference between this and earlier series. The houses were, as in series 1, 1930s style bungalows.

=== Series 4 (2002) ===
This series took place in Wanganui. The way that the teams were chosen was changed: potential teams were required to design the house before selection. The houses were located on site before the series began, and were 1940s or 1950s style state houses. This is the first series where the final product resembled a house that looked nothing like its original design, with much of the original house having been demolished. Teams were required to increase the floor space of the house by 50%.

=== Series 5 (2003) ===
This series took place in Dunedin. The original houses were once again 1950s state houses but the houses this time were demolished down to the original floor boards and a single wall, but some materials from the original houses were reused in the new house. This was the first series where the couples and their designers were given the opportunity to see the room the other team had completed and give their view, usually picking any faults out to the shows viewers.

=== Series 6 (2005) ===
This series took place in Upper Hutt. The houses had their floor space increased between 100% and 200%, creating much larger houses. The original houses were 1950s state houses painted by the show producers in blue and yellow before the series began.

=== Series 7 (2006) ===
This series took place in Whangārei. The amount of floor space the teams had to increase and the size of the property were both reduced, and a requirement was put in place that the teams had to keep at least 30% of the original wall structure. The final result produced a house that looked nothing like the original.

=== Series 8 (2007) ===
This series took place in Whakatāne. This was the first series were the series was produced by TVNZ instead, the show still remained hosted by Jayne Kiely and included the same judges. The show became much more like a reality TV show with a Shed Cam, where members of the team could sit in front of the camera and express anything they needed to say to the viewers. As well as this, the show became more competitive, showing rivalry between the two teams, as opposed to in the past, where the two teams had treated each other as their future neighbours and were much more friendly. A rising property market in every region since the show began has made purchasing the Dream Home for the team who come second much harder. In this series, both teams faced the reality that if they didn't win their Dream Home the couple would not be able to afford to purchase the property at auction. The auction for the second place teams Dream Home did not meet reserve and viewers were left uncertain of whether the family would be able to purchase the home but it was revealed the following day the family managed to negotiate to purchase the property. At the time the winner was announced, transmission of the show was cut at the crucial moment. However, it was rescreened minutes later.

=== Series 9 (2008) ===
This series took place in Hāwera. The show was branded as Mitre 10 Dream Home Ultimate with bigger houses on a bigger section and bigger prizes to be won. The teams also won prizes for winning the room each week. The series returned to being produced by Ninox Films. The winner was the Yellow team. The Blue team won their auction with no other bidders trying to take them on.

=== Series 10 (2009) ===
This series took place in Greymouth. The expectations for the houses in this series were scaled back to reflect tougher economic time as a result of the recession. The houses had to "reflect their original character" and the budget was reduced. However, there was still an expectation of a 100% increase in the floorspace of the houses. Four couples were shortlisted for the show, competing in pairs for each of the two houses. Rather unusually, neither of the two couples picked to compete for the Blue House were chosen to renovate that house. Instead, one of the couples originally picked to compete for the Yellow house was chosen to renovate the Blue House and competed as the "Blue Team". The way the judges come to their decision as to who is the winner each week was changed. Each of the three judges rate each team a score out of ten. The scores are added together and the team with the highest score wins for the week. This makes it possible for the judges decision to be a tie, which was the result in the first week. In this case, both teams won a prize for winning the room for that week. The Yellow Team won this series, and the Blue Team were successful in buying their house at the auction.

=== Series 11 (2013) ===
This series took place in Kaiapoi, a satellite town of Christchurch which was badly affected by the 2010 Canterbury earthquake and the subsequent 2011 Christchurch earthquake. After four years off the air Mitre 10 Dream Home returned in July 2013, with Simon Barnett replacing Jayne Kiely as host. Unlike the previous series, the six finalist families were announced early in 2013 and the public were given a chance to vote for their favourite with the top voted family securing a spot on the show. The other family was picked by the judges. The 2013 series saw the show's first same sex couple. Due to changes in the building code post-earthquake, especially concerning foundations (the land the houses are being built on is classified TC2 "green-yellow", requiring more specialised foundations), the teams could no longer renovate a relocatable house instead the teams were required to design and build a house from scratch.

The team colours were changed in 2013 to orange and black, in keeping with the new Mitre 10 Mega logo. While the houses in previous series had three bedroom each, the houses in this series both had over three bedrooms. This series also introduced DIY challenges, on top of the main challenge with cash prizes.

In addition to a 1-hour show on Tuesday nights, a 30-minute show titled Mitre 10 Dream Home: Offcuts was screened on a Saturday night. The Offcuts show featured behind the scenes footage, highlights and a chance for the teams to reflect the previous weeks show.

The orange team were the winning team in 2013. Both teams were given a valuation for their homes of around $500,000 each, but both only sold for $375,000, with the only other bids, controversially, being vendor bids.

== International versions ==
=== Australian adaptation ===
In May 2023, it was announced Australia’s Seven Network would be adapting the series, to be produced by Endemol Shine Australia, to air in 2024. In June 2023, it was announced Dr Chris Brown will host the series. In March 2024, buyer’s agent Simon Cohen, interior designer Rosie Morley, and Lana Taylor of Three Birds Renovations were announced as series judges. The series premiered on 26 May 2024.

=== Canadian adaptation ===
A Canadian adaptation of the show, Rona Dream Home, was hosted by Caroline Redekopp and aired for two seasons after premiering in 2004 on Global. It was sponsored by Rona, Inc.

A French Canadian adaptation of the show also debuted in 2004, airing on French language channel TVA for seven seasons before concluding in 2009.

== See also ==
- Extreme Makeover: Home Edition
- My Lottery Dream Home
- Prize home lottery
- Show home
- Dream Home (Australian TV series)
