= List of Chris & Julia's Sunday Night Takeaway episodes =

Chris & Julia's Sunday Night Takeaway (frequently referred to as Sunday Night Takeaway or simply Takeaway) is an Australian television variety show, presented by Chris Brown & Julia Morris. It is based on the British television show of a similar name, Ant & Dec's Saturday Night Takeaway, created and presented by Ant McPartlin and Declan Donnelly.

The following lists each series, a brief summary of segments, including changes to what was used, appearances by guests, ratings for each episode, scores from the "Chris vs. Julia" segment and information on guest announcers that appear.

== Series overview ==
| Series | Episodes | Start date | End date | Ave. viewers (millions) |
|---|---|---|---|---|
| 1 | 8 | 24 February 2019 | 14 April 2019 | 0.270 |
| TR | 2 | 18 April 2020 | 25 April 2020 | 0.1405 |

== Series 1 (2019) ==
Ratings

| Episode | Date | Viewers (millions) | Rank | Source |
|---|---|---|---|---|
| 1 | 24 February 2019 | 0.383 | 9 | |
| 2 | 3 March 2019 | 0.290 | 15 | |
| 3 | 10 March 2019 | 0.259 | 13 | |
| 4 | 17 March 2019 | 0.279 | 19 | |
| 5 | 24 March 2019 | 0.246 | 16 | |
| 6 | 31 March 2019 | 0.285 | 20 | |
| 7 | 7 April 2019 | 0.161 | — | |
| 8 | 14 April 2019 | 0.254 | 16 | |

I’m A Celebrity... Get out of my Ear!

| Show | Date | Celebrities |
|---|---|---|
| 1 | 24 February 2019 | Grant Denyer |
| 2 | 3 March 2019 | Tim Robards & Anna Heinrich |
| 5 | 24 March 2019 | Angie Kent & Yvie Jones |
| 7 | 7 April 2019 | Josh Gibson & Kris Smith |
| 8 | 14 April 2019 | Lisa Wilkinson |

Undercover Pranks

| Show | Date | Celebrities |
|---|---|---|
| 3 | 10 March 2019 | Steve Price |
| 4 | 17 March 2019 | Osher Günsberg |

Audience Surprise

| Show | Date | Shows featured in | Celebrities featured in |
|---|---|---|---|
| 1 | 24 February 2019 | Gold Coast Triathlon | |
| 1 | 24 February 2019 | Bachelor in Paradise Australia | Osher Günsberg |
| 1 | 24 February 2019 | Dancing with the Stars | Amanda Keller, Grant Denyer, Jorja Freeman, Craig Revel Horwood, Sharna Burgess, Tristan MacManus |
| 3 | 10 March 2019 | 10 News First | Chris Bath & Lachlan Kennedy |
| 4 | 17 March 2019 | NCIS (TCIS) | Peter Phelps |
| 5 | 24 March 2019 | Bathurst 1000 | James Courtney, David Reynolds & Craig Lowndes |
| 6 | 31 March 2019 | Jersey Boys | Ryan González, Cameron MacDonald, Thomas McGuane, Glaston Toft & the cast of Jersey Boys Australia. |
| 6 | 31 March 2019 | N/A | Tanya Hennesy |
| 6 | 31 March 2019 | I'm A Celebrity...Get Me Out of Here! | |
| 8 | 14 April 2019 | NCIS with Budget Direct | Magda Szubanski |

Little Chris & Julia

| Show | Date | Celebrity |
|---|---|---|
| 1 | 24 February 2019 | George Ezra |
| 3 | 10 March 2019 | Andrew Bogut |

Singalong Live

| Show | Date | Celebrities | Song |
|---|---|---|---|
| 1 | 24 February 2019 | Mark Gable & Ian Hulmes | Run to Paradise |
| 3 | 10 March 2019 | Pseudo Echo | Funkytown |
| 5 | 25 March 2019 | Shannon Noll | What About Me |
| 7 | 7 April 2019 | Dave Faulkner & Brad Shepherd | What's My Scene? |

Chris VS. Julia

| Challenge Number | Date | Challenge | Winner | Chris' score | Julia's score | Celebrities |
|---|---|---|---|---|---|---|
| 1 | 24 February 2019 | Trials - 'Revenge Time' | Chris | 1 (10) | 0 (8) | Shane Warne, Keira Maguire, Richard Reid |
| 2 | 3 March 2019 | TBC | Chris | 1 (Won) | 0 (Lost) | N/A |
| 3 | 7 April 2019 | Saturday Night Fever Dancer | Julia | 0 (Lost) | 1 (Won) | Timomatic |
| 4 | 14 April 2019 | Reading the News with Natarsha Belling | Julia | 0 (11) | 2 (14) | Natarsha Belling |
| Total: | | | Julia | 2 | 3 | |

Celebrity announcers

| Show | Date | Celebrities |
|---|---|---|
| 1 | 24 February 2019 | Shane Warne |
| 2 | 3 March 2019 | Hanson |
| 3 | 10 March 2019 | Ronn Moss |
| 4 | 17 March 2019 | Justin Lacko |
| 6 | 31 March 2019 | Ronan Keating |
| 7 | 7 April 2019 | Matt Preston |

"End of the Show Show"

| Show | Date | Celebrity | Song |
|---|---|---|---|
| 8 | 14 April 2019 | Anthony Callea | Love from Takeaway |

== Takeaway Reheated (2020) ==
Ratings

| Episode | Date | Viewers (millions) | Rank | Source |
|---|---|---|---|---|
| 1 | 18 April 2020 | 0.175 | — | |
| 2 | 25 April 2020 | 0.106 | — | |
| 3 | 2 May 2020 | TBC | — | |
| 4 | 9 May 2020 | TBC | — | |
| 5 | 16 May 2020 | TBC | — | |
| 6 | 23 May 2020 | TBC | — | |
