= Master the Mess =

- Genre: Home improvement
- Presented by: Clea Shearer; Joanna Teplin
- Country of origin: United States
- Original language: English
- No. of seasons: 1
- No. of episodes: 12

Production
- Executive producer: Reese Witherspoon
- Production company: Hello Sunshine

Original release
- Network: DirecTV
- Release: September 4 – October 9, 2018

Master the Mess is an American reality home improvement television series hosted by professional organizers Clea Shearer and Joanna Teplin. The series premiered on DirecTV on September 4, 2018, and ran for one season, consisting of 12 mini-episodes. The concept was later expanded into the Netflix series Get Organized with The Home Edit in 2019.

== Overview ==
Master The Mess follows professional organizers Clea Shearer and Joanna Teplin as they reorganize closets, pantries, bathrooms, and other household spaces for both celebrity and non-celebrity clients. The show was announced on July 10 2018, and premiered on September 4, 2018 on DirecTV.

The series was created as part of Hello Sunshine Video On Demand, a subscription channel provided by a partnership between AT&T and Reese Witherspoon's production company Hello Sunshine. The series ran for one season, consisting of 12 mini-episodes. In 2019 Shearer and Teplin expanded the concept into the Netflix series Get Organized with The Home Edit.

== Episodes ==
=== Season 1 ===
No.	Title	Original release date
1	"Meet Clea & Joanna"	September 4, 2018
2	"Sexy Section"	September 4, 2018
3	"Work Wives"	September 11, 2018
4	"Critter Phobia"	September 11, 2018
5	"Olivia Culpo"	September 18, 2018
6	"Diamond in the Rough"	September 18, 2018
7	"Hot Mess Express"	September 25, 2018
8	"Shay Mitchell"	September 25, 2018
9	"Life or Death Pantry"	October 2, 2018
10	"Down the Rabbit Hole"	October 2, 2018
11	"Rainbow Twins"	October 9, 2018
12	"Keeping up With Clea"	October 9, 2018
