= Chris & Julia's Sunday Night Takeaway =

Television show

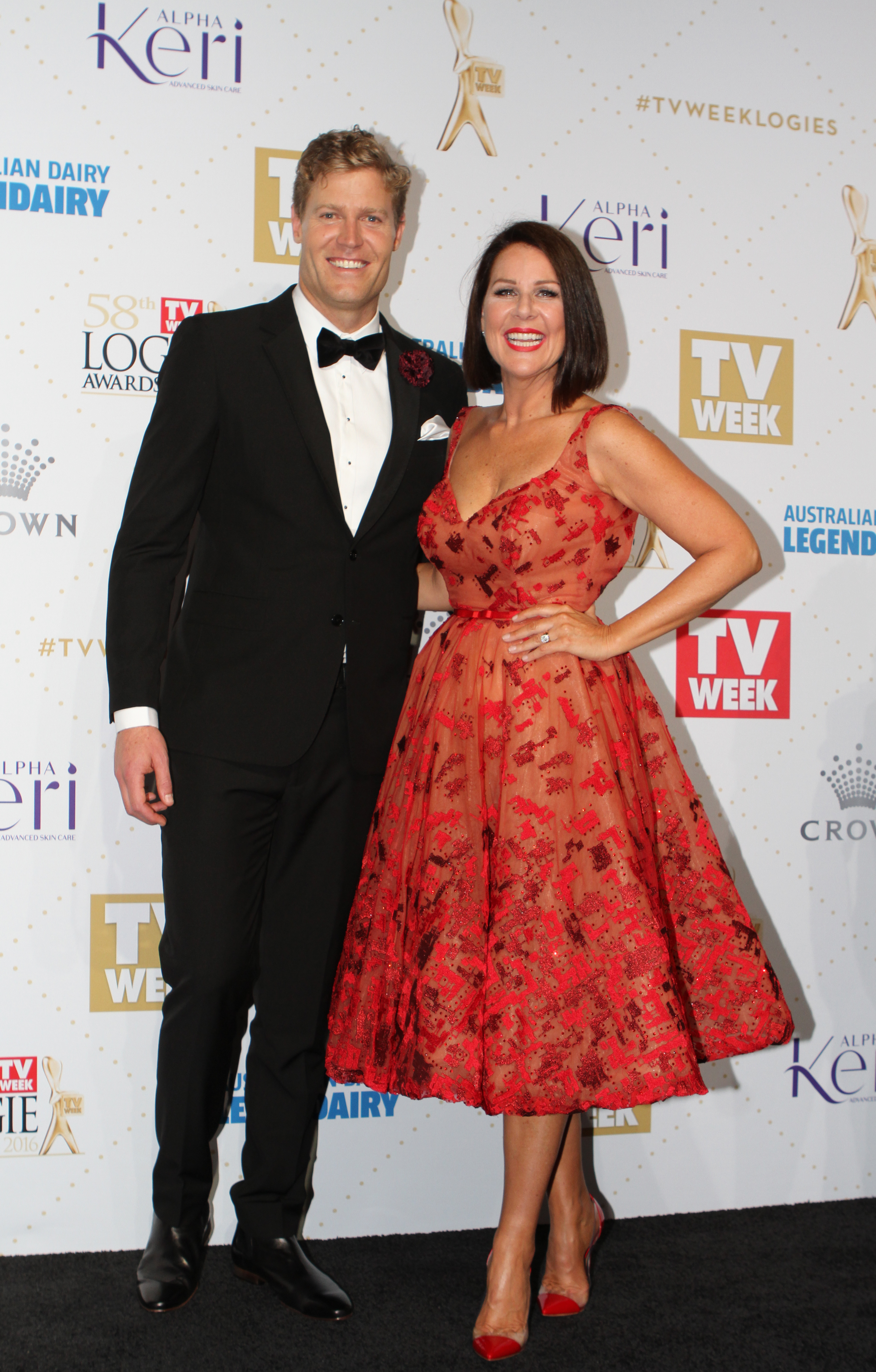
- Also known as: Sunday Night Takeaway; Takeaway
- Genre: Entertainment; Variety
- Created by: Anthony McPartlin; Declan Donnelly
- Based on: Ant & Dec's Saturday Night Takeaway
- Presented by: Chris Brown; Julia Morris
- Starring: Beau Ryan
- Theme music composer: Nile Rodgers; Bernard Edwards; Bobby Carter
- Opening theme: Takeaway (remix of Saturday Night Takeaway by Audiofreaks)
- Country of origin: Australia
- Original language: English
- No. of series: 1
- No. of episodes: 8 (list of episodes)

Production
- Production locations: Sydney, New South Wales
- Camera setup: Multi-camera setup
- Running time: 90 minutes (Approx; inc. adverts)
- Production company: ITV Studios Australia

Original release
- Network: Network 10
- Release: 24 February – 14 April 2019

Chris & Julia's Sunday Night Takeaway (frequently referred to as Sunday Night Takeaway or simply Takeaway) is an Australian television variety show, presented by Chris Brown and Julia Morris. It premiered on Network 10 on 24 February 2019 and aired on Sunday nights. It is based on the British television show, Ant & Dec's Saturday Night Takeaway, created and presented by Anthony McPartlin and Declan Donnelly. The show features a mixture of live and pre-recorded entertainment, quiz segments and competitions. Chris & Julia's Sunday Night Takeaway was filmed at Fox Studios Australia.

== Format ==
Sunday Night Takeaway is a variety show which has a number of segments including 'Undercover', 'In for a Dollar', 'Happiest Minute', 'I'm a Celebrity...Get Out of My Ear!', 'Audience Surprise', 'Little Chris & Julia', 'Home Run', 'Read My Lips', 'Couch Watch', 'Game of Phones', 'Singalong Live', 'Chris vs. Julia' and 'Win the Ads'. These segments and games are mostly adapted from the British version of the show, Ant & Dec's Saturday Night Takeaway, and the different games and segments in the show are similar to or replicas of those on Saturday Night Takeaway.

=== Takeaway Reheated ===
From 18 April 2020, Network Ten aired encores of the show during the COVID-19 pandemic on Saturday nights at 6 pm, which included newly filmed content from the homes of Dr Chris Brown, Julia Morris and Beau Ryan. After its second episode, Takeaway Reheated was moved to a new timeslot of Saturdays at 4 pm. Its final episode aired on 23 May 2020.

== Ratings ==
Series	Episodes	Premiere			Finale			Source
Series	Episodes	Premiere date	Premiere viewers	Rank	Finale date	Finale viewers	Rank	Source
1	8	24 February 2019	0.383	9	14 April 2019	0.254	16	
TR	6	18 April 2020	0.175	TBC	23 May 2020	TBC	TBC	TBC
