= Raffle House =

UK-based company

Raffle House Ltd is a UK-based company specialising in property raffles, providing participants with a chance to win houses and other high-value prizes through raffle draws. Founded in 2017 by Benno Spencer, the company is headquartered in London, England.

== History ==
The company was established in 2017 and offers property raffles. The company sells raffle tickets online. A winner is selected randomly once all tickets are sold at the specified deadline. The winner elects whether to take receipt of the property or a commensurate alternative cash prize.

== Charitable initiatives ==
A portion of the proceeds from each raffle is donated to charities. The company has partnered with organisations such as Brain Tumour Research to support housing and humanitarian efforts.
