= Clea Shearer =

American entrepreneur

Clea Shearer is an American entrepreneur, co-founder of the home organization company The Home Edit, co-host of the Netflix series Get Organized with The Home Edit and co-host of ABC's revival of Extreme Makeover: Home Edition. Shearer attended the Parsons School of Design in New York City and is the co-author of the New York Times bestseller books, The Home Edit: A Guide to Organizing and Realizing Your House Goals and The Home Edit Life: The No-Guilt Guide to Owning What You Want and Organizing Everything.

== Career ==
Shearer met her business partner, Joanna Teplin, in 2015, and within hours of first meeting, the two began building their business, deciding on a name, setting up their website, domain, and social media handles, designing their logo and filling out paperwork. Their business, The Home Edit, began to take off after they organized actress Christina Applegate's house in exchange for an Instagram post about them on Applegate's account. On September 4, 2018, Master the Mess, a reality home improvement series hosted by Shearer and Teplin, was released on DirecTV. A Netflix show about the business, Get Organized with The Home Edit, hosted by Shearer and Teplin, was released on September 9, 2020, and its second season was released on April 1, 2022. In January 2022, Walmart announced it was teaming up with Shearer and Teplin for a new product line of organizational tools that were easy to use and tied to specific rooms. Shearer stated that one of their biggest goals at The Home Edit is "making sure we democratize organization as much as possible."

On February 23, 2022, it was announced that Reese Witherspoon's media company, Hello Sunshine, had acquired The Home Edit.

On June 5, 2023, it was announced that a revival of Extreme Makeover: Home Edition was in development at ABC. On May 7, 2024, the series was ordered with Shearer and Joanna Teplin as co-hosts. The revival premiered on January 2, 2025, and has been on hiatus since February 20, 2025.

== Personal life ==
Shearer is married to photographer, John Shearer. The couple lives in Nashville with their two children, daughter, Stella Blue, and son, Sutton Gray.

On April 7, 2022, Shearer announced she had breast cancer and was undergoing a double mastectomy.
