= Joanna Teplin =

American entrepreneur

- Born: August 20, 1979 (age 47); Chapel Hill, North Carolina, U.S.
- Career
- Show: Extreme Makeover: Home Edition
- Network: ABC

Joanna Teplin (born August 20, 1979) is an American entrepreneur, co-founder of the home organization company The Home Edit, co-host of the Netflix series Get Organized with The Home Edit and co-host of ABC's upcoming revival of Extreme Makeover: Home Edition. Teplin is the co-author of the New York Times bestseller books, The Home Edit: A Guide to Organizing and Realizing Your House Goals and The Home Edit Life: The No-Guilt Guide to Owning What You Want and Organizing Everything.

== Career ==
Teplin met her business partner, Clea Shearer, in 2015. Within hours of first meeting, the two began building their business, deciding on a name, setting up their website, domain, and social media handles, designing their logo and filling out paperwork. Their business, The Home Edit, began to take off after they organized actress Christina Applegate's house in exchange for an Instagram post about them on Applegate's account.

On September 4, 2018, Master the Mess, a reality home improvement series co-hosted by Teplin and Shearer, was released on DirecTV. A Netflix show about the business, Get Organized with The Home Edit, also co-hosted by Teplin and Shearer, was released on September 9, 2020, and its second season was released on April 1, 2022.

In January 2022, Walmart announced it was teaming up with Teplin and Shearer for a new product line of organizational tools that were easy to use and tied to specific rooms.

On June 5, 2023, it was announced that a revival of Extreme Makeover: Home Edition was in development at ABC. On May 7, 2024, the series was ordered with Teplin and Clea Shearer serving as co-hosts. The revival premiered on January 2, 2025.

== Personal life ==
Teplin graduated from the University of California, Santa Barbara in 2001 with a bachelor's degree in film studies. Upon graduation, she moved to San Francisco to work at a high-end boutique shop called Union Street Papery. Joanna and her husband, Jeremy Rubin have two kids together, their son, Miles Reid, and their daughter, Marlowe Aerin. Teplin is afraid of flying.
