= My Reno Rules =

2026 Australian reality TV series

- Genre: Reality television Renovation
- Presented by: Dr. Chris Brown
- Judges: Neale Whitaker; Simon Cohen; Julia Green
- Country of origin: Australia
- Original language: English
- No. of series: 1
- No. of episodes: 8

Production
- Production location: Bulleen, Victoria, Australia
- Running time: 90 mins (inc. ads)
- Production company: Endemol Shine Australia

Original release
- Network: Seven Network
- Release: 21 April 2026 – present

Related
- My Restaurant Rules; My Kitchen Rules; House Rules; Dream Home

My Reno Rules is an Australian reality renovation television series which premiered on 21 April 2026 on the Seven Network. The series sees four teams renovate two houses with the renovated houses given to two home viewers and the winning team receiving $1 million cash prize. The series is hosted by Dr. Chris Brown and features entrepreneur Adrian Portelli.

The series was won by Mitch & Shaz who received $1 million prize, however the remaining teams all received a cash prize, Franky & Isaac received $250k for second, Emma & Michelle received $100k for third and Nathan & Julia received $50k for fourth. The two home viewers were given the choice of the house or $2 million each, they both opted for the $2 million.

== Production ==
In June 2025, a casting call opened for a new renovation series for the Seven Network looking for teams to renovate two houses, this would be the third reno series within 13 years for Seven after House Rules (2013–20) and Dream Home (2024), respectively. In July 2025, more details on the series were released, including the series will be hosted by Chris Brown, there will be four teams to renovate two houses which will be rewarded to two series viewers and the winning team will receive a cash prize. The houses, located in Bulleen, were donated by Rewards program LMCT+ founder, Adrian Portelli, who was formally an auction buyer of multiple homes on Nine Network’s, The Block. In August 2025, former The Block judge, Neale Whitaker, was announced as a series judge alongside buyer’s agent from Luxe Listings Sydney, Simon Cohen, and interior design expert Julia Green. Filming is scheduled to shoot from 26 September to 27 November 2025. In October 2025, the series was officially confirmed by Seven at their annual upfronts. In November 2025, production was temporarily shut down as asbestos was found in one of the houses being renovated. The first teaser trailer was released on 6 March 2026. The series will premiere on 21 April 2026. The teams and prize money of $100,000 were revealed on 10 April 2026.

== Contestants ==
| House | Team | Age | City/State | Relationship | Occupations |
|---|---|---|---|---|---|
| 1 | Emma & Michelle | 33 & 56 | Queensland | Daughter & Mother | Interior Designer and Hair & Beauty |
| 1 | Nathan & Julia | Both 34 | Victoria | Married Parents | Electrcian and Stay-at-home mum |
| 2 | Franky & Issac | 38 & 23 | Melbourne | Best mates | Audio Visual |
| 2 | Mitch & Shaz | Both 34 | Queensland | Married with a child | Landscape project manager & Interior Designer |

== Score history ==
Teams' progress through the competition
| Team | Cycle scores | | | | Total score (out of 120) | Result |
|---|---|---|---|---|---|---|
| Team | 1 | 2 | 3 | 4 | Total score (out of 120) | Result |
| Mitch & Shaz | 25 | 25 | 20 | 29.5 | 99.5 | Winners |
| Franky & Issac | 20.5 | 28.5 | 22 | 26 | 97 | Runners-up |
| Emma & Michelle | 20.5 | 21.5 | 29 | 25 | 96 | Third place |
| Nathan & Julia | 22.5 | 23 | 26.5 | 23 | 95 | Fourth place |

== Competition progress ==
The four teams are challenged to transform the interiors and facades of two houses in Bulleen. Each week the teams are allocated to the rooms they must renovate. Once all weeks are complete, the top scoring team overall will receive a grand prize, originally set at $100k but has become subject to change over the duration of the series.

=== Cycle 1 ===
- Episodes 1 & 2
- Airdate — 21 & 22 April
- Description — The four teams arrive in Bulleen, Victoria and are split into two house teams. Each team works on two rooms during the week and the team with the highest score leads the leaderboard.
- Adrian's judging — Adrian does a solo walk through of the rooms and the team he believes have the best rooms is awarded $10k extra on their budget. This week he awarded this to Mitch & Shaz.
- Prize increase — Originally announced to be $100k to the winning overall highest scoring team of the series, after the first renovations were complete, Adrian bumped up the prize to $250k.

Renovation summary
Week 1
| House | Team | Room(s) | Judges' Scores | | | Total (out of 30) | Running Total (Week 1) |
| House | Team | Room(s) | Julia | Neale | Simon | Total (out of 30) | Running Total (Week 1) |
|---|---|---|---|---|---|---|---|
| 1 | Emma & Michelle | Living Room & Guest Bedroom | | | | 20.5 | 20.5 / 30 |
| 1 | Nathan & Julia | Kids' bedroom & Bathroom | | | | 22.5 | 22.5 / 30 |
| 2 | Franky & Issac | Bathroom & Guest Bedroom | | | | 20.5 | 20.5 / 30 |
| 2 | Mitch & Shaz | Living Room & Kids' Bedroom | | | | 25 | 25 / 30 |

=== Cycle 2 ===
- Episodes 3 & 4
- Airdate — 28 April & 4 May
- Description — The four teams begin work on their second rooms. Each team works on two rooms during the week and the team with the highest score leads the leaderboard.
- Adrian's judging — Adrian does a solo walk through of the rooms and the team he believes have the best rooms is awarded $10k extra on their budget. This week he awarded this to Franky & Issac.
- Prize increase — After the second renovations were complete, Adrian announced the prize had been bumped up again to $1 million for the winner and $250k for second place.

Renovation summary
Week 2
| House | Team | Room(s) | Judges' Scores | | | Total (out of 30) | Running Total (Week 1 & 2) |
| House | Team | Room(s) | Julia | Neale | Simon | Total (out of 30) | Running Total (Week 1 & 2) |
|---|---|---|---|---|---|---|---|
| 1 | Emma & Michelle | Study, Parent's Lounge & Ensuite | | | | 21.5 | 42 / 60 |
| 1 | Nathan & Julia | Master Bedroom & Hallway | | | | 23 | 45.5 / 60 |
| 2 | Franky & Issac | Entrance Foyer, Walk-in-robe & Master Bedroom | | | | 28.5 | 49 / 60 |
| 2 | Mitch & Shaz | Parent's Retreat, Ensuite & Bedroom | | | | 25 | 50 / 60 |

=== Cycle 3 ===
- Episodes 5 & 6
- Airdate — 12 & 19 May
- Description — The four teams begin work on their last interior rooms. Each team works on their rooms during the week and the team with the highest score leads the leaderboard.
- Adrian's judging — Adrian does a solo walk through of the rooms and the team he believes have the best rooms is awarded $10k extra on their budget. This week he awarded this to Emma & Michelle.

Renovation summary
Week 3
| House | Team | Room(s) | Judges' Scores | | | Total (out of 30) | Running Total (Week 1 to 3) |
| House | Team | Room(s) | Julia | Neale | Simon | Total (out of 30) | Running Total (Week 1 to 3) |
|---|---|---|---|---|---|---|---|
| 1 | Emma & Michelle | Laundry, Stairs & Living Room | | | | 29 | 71 / 90 |
| 1 | Nathan & Julia | Kitchen, Dining Room & Powder Room | | | | 26.5 | 72 / 90 |
| 2 | Franky & Issac | Laundry, Stairs & Living Room | | | | 22 | 71 / 90 |
| 2 | Mitch & Shaz | Kitchen & Dining Room | | | | 20 | 70 / 90 |

== Ratings ==
| Phase | No. | Title | Air date | Timeslot | National total viewers | Night rank | Ref(s) |
|---|---|---|---|---|---|---|---|
| Week 1 | 1 | First Rooms Begin | 21 April 2026 | Tuesday 7:30 pm | 638,000 | 5 | |
| Week 1 | 2 | First Room Reveals | 22 April 2026 | Wednesday 7:30 pm | 693,000 | 3 | |
| Week 2 | 3 | Second Rooms Begin | 28 April 2026 | Tuesday 7:30 pm | 545,000 | 7 | |
| Week 2 | 4 | Second Room Reveals | 5 May 2026 | Tuesday 7:30 pm | 571,000 | 8 | |
| Week 3 | 5 | Third Rooms Begin | 12 May 2026 | Tuesday 7:30 pm | 493,000 | 13 | |
| Week 3 | 6 | Third Rooms Revealed | 19 May 2026 | Tuesday 7:30 pm | 596,000 | 8 | |
| Week 4 | 7 | Back and Frontyards Begin | 26 May 2026 | Tuesday 7:30 pm | 565,000 | 9 | |
| Week 4 | 8 | Yards revealed and Grand Final | 2 June 2026 | Tuesday 7:30 pm | 718,000 | 6 | |
