= Mitre 10 (New Zealand) =

New Zealand hardware store chain

Mitre 10 New Zealand Limited

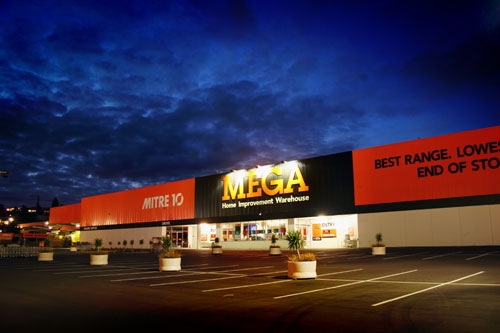
- Type: Private
- Industry: Retail and trade building supplies
- Founded: 20 June 1974; 52 years ago
- Headquarters: Auckland, New Zealand
- Number of locations: 86 (2026)
- Area served: New Zealand
- Key people: Lindsay Rowles (CEO) Mark Conelly (CFO) Peter Muggleston (CDO)
- Products: Building materials; Hardware; Tools; Plumbing; Kitchens; Paint; Housewares; Electrical; Gardening; Plants
- Website: www.mitre10.co.nz

Mitre 10 is a New Zealand chain of home improvement stores established in June 1974. The company sells a range of household hardware, building supplies, heaters, air conditioners, garden products, barbecues and camping gear.

There are 86 Mitre 10 member stores around New Zealand, including 19 in Auckland. Together, the members employ more than 8,000 staff.

== History ==
Mitre 10 was started in Melbourne, Australia in 1959 as a local co-operative, with the initial 8 independent operators pooling their resources for shared advertising and promotion. Separate state-based companies were formed in the years following. An overall licensing company was established in 1964.

The co-operative concept became known to New Zealand hardware shop owners, and on 28 June 1974 the New Zealand Herald reported "some of the smaller firms in the timber and hardware merchandising field are grouping together to present a unified buying and selling front." The first member's meeting in 1974 consisted of twelve members representing fifteen stores.

In the late 1980s the chain expanded its to include home and garden products. In 1994 the "Mitre 10 Home and Trade" brand was established. Two brand names (Hammer Hardware, Mitre 10 Mega) further expanded the Mitre 10 presence in both the small and large towns and cities. There were 50 Mitre 10 stores in 1999, 113 in 2003 and 83 in 2019.

In 2010 Mitre 10 (New Zealand) Limited took full ownership of the Mitre 10 brands for New Zealand after changes to the ownership of the Mitre 10 operation in Australia. Despite sharing the same heritage, the modern operations in New Zealand and Australia are separate.

=== Sponsorships ===
Mitre 10 was formerly involved in the production of Mitre 10 Dream Home, a reality television series which ran from 1999 until 2013.

From 2016 to 2020, Mitre 10 became the sponsor of the National Provincial Championship, which became colloquially known as the Mitre 10 Cup.

In partnership with Kiwibank, the company annually runs the Mitre 10 Awards to acknowledge and support community projects.

== MEGA Stores ==
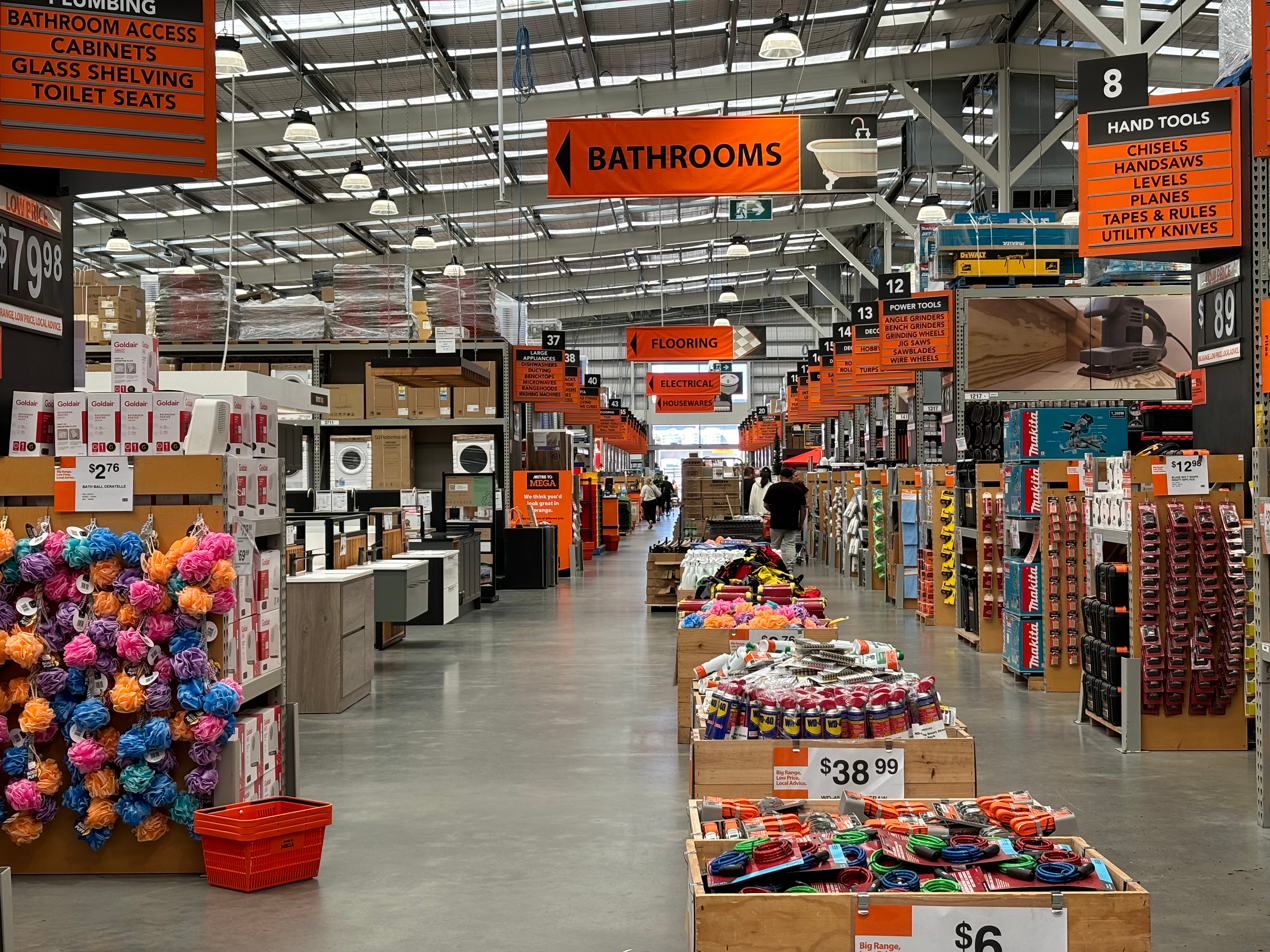
Mitre 10 MEGA store in Hornby

Mitre 10 Mega is a chain of big-box stores. Mega stores offer customers a larger product range than standard Mitre 10 stores, including a larger range of garden-related products. The first Mega store opened in Hastings Central in 2004.
