= Prize home lottery =

Type of lottery

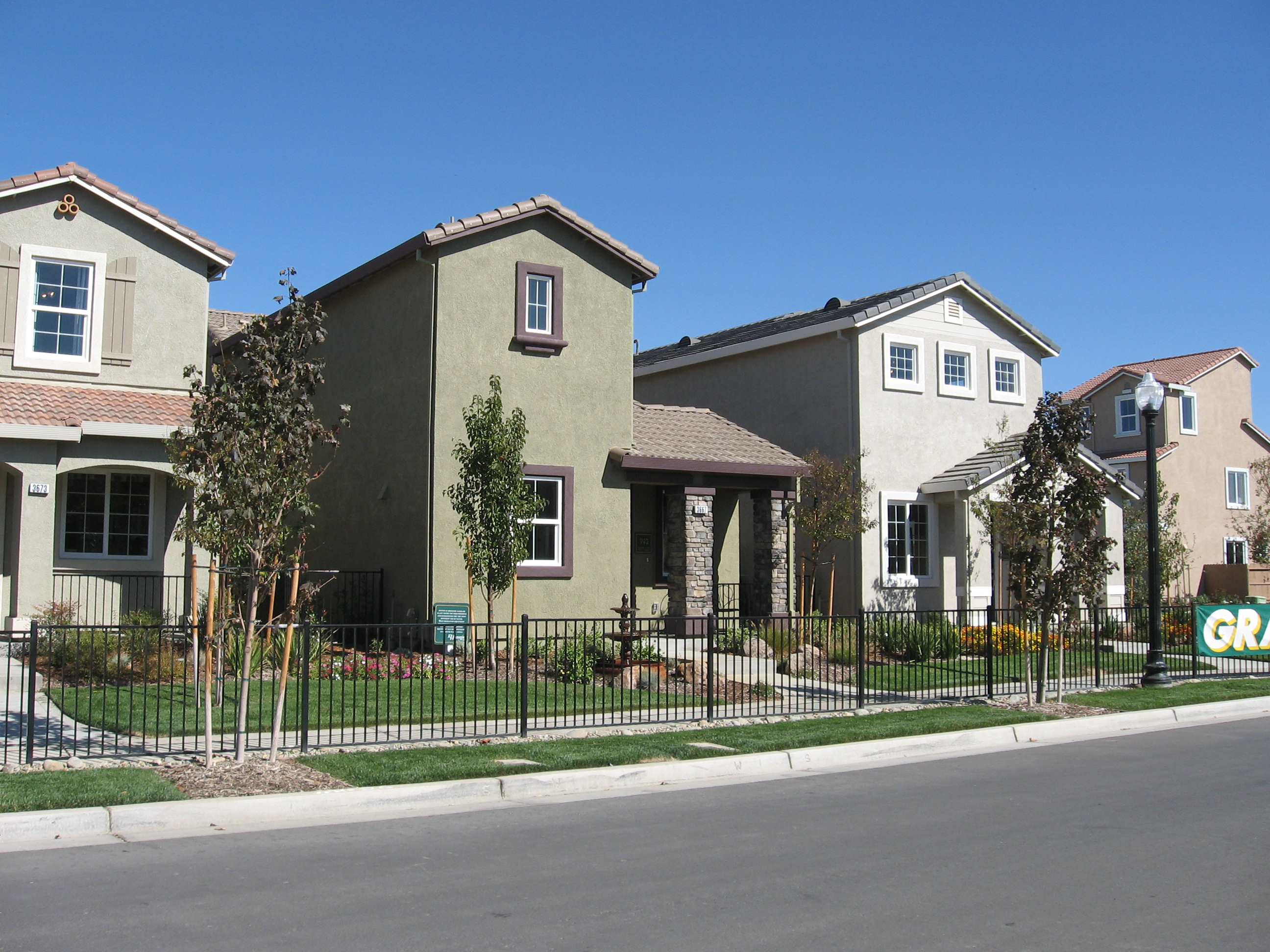
Show homes are commonly awarded in prize home lotteries

A prize home lottery, or property raffle, is a type of lottery in which a single-unit residential building is awarded as opposed to a lump sum financial prize. Prize home lotteries began to appear across North America, Australia, and Western Europe in the 1950s. While a number of homes built prior to this have historically been associated with lottery winnings, typically they were funded with traditional lottery earnings and not through a formal prize home lottery.

== History ==
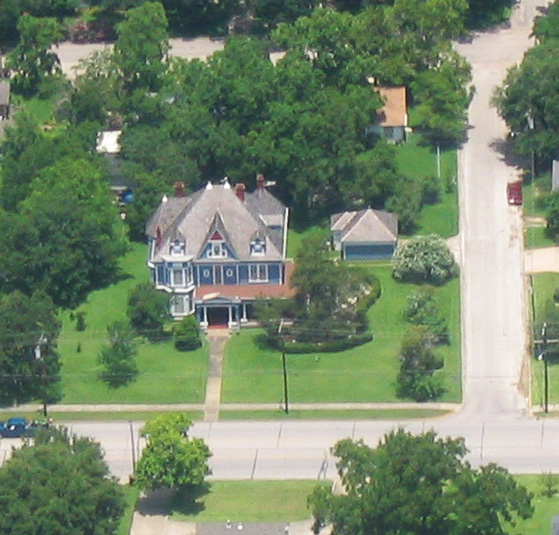
The 1902 Sangster House in Navasota, Texas was funded with traditional lottery earnings, not through a prize home lottery.

The earliest home lotteries took place in Canada. The first home lottery in North America was in 1934 in Vancouver, Canada. In the spring of 1939, Toronto mayor Ralph Day came under scrutiny since the earliest home lotteries were not governmentally regulated. In 1944, the Ottawa Journal announced that the Canadian province of Ontario was experiencing "an epidemic of house lotteries."

Outside of Canada, the idea of a prize home lottery started becoming widespread in the United States, Australia, and Western Europe in the 1950s. Today, a contemporary example can be seen in the RSL Australia Prize Home Lottery, which is a notable prize home lottery in Australia.

== Government regulation ==
Prize home lotteries have historically been subject to government regulation and have sometimes led to lawsuits. For example, in 1958, an entrepreneur named Ronald A. Hodges registered Canadian patents pertaining to prize home lotteries, including one patent for "division of property in a dream home contest." This led to a lawsuit, R. v. Hodges in 1959. In 1960, the Supreme Court of Canada ruled prize home lotteries illegal in Canada. This decision did not last long, however, as numerous dream home lotteries were held in Canada in the 1960s.

== In television ==
Although prize home lotteries became widespread in the 1950s, it was not until 2015 that the concept of a prize home lottery was used as the premise of a television programme with HGTV's My Lottery Dream Home. Hosted by David Bromstad, the programme is a joint production between Seven Network and Beyond International. In 2021, My Lottery Dream Home International, a related programme with a global as opposed to American focus premiered with host Laurence Llewelyn-Bowen. Other television programmes like Mitre 10 Dream Home and Extreme Makeover: Home Edition award prize homes though their selection process is not in the form of a lottery.

== Notable prize home lotteries ==
- RSL Art Union Prize Home Lottery
- HGTV Dream Home Lottery
- Klondike Days Dream Home Lottery

== See also ==
- Extreme Makeover: Home Edition
- List of lotteries
- Mitre 10 Dream Home
- My Lottery Dream Home
- Show home
- Raffle House
