= Extreme Makeover: Home Edition =

American reality television series

- Logo for the HGTV iteration
- Genre: Reality television
- Presented by: Ty Pennington; Jesse Tyler Ferguson; Clea Shearer; Joanna Teplin
- Composers: Eric Allaman (2004–2009); Rob Cairns (2006–2009); Rudy Guess (2006–2008); Brad Chiet (2004–2008)
- Country of origin: United States
- No. of seasons: 11
- No. of episodes: 219 (+ 14 specials) (list of episodes)

Production
- Running time: 43 minutes (86 minutes for two-part episodes)
- Production companies: Hoosick Falls Productions; Base Camp Films; Monkupower, Inc.; Denise Cramsey Productions; Tom Forman Productions; Hello Sunshine (2025–present); Walt Disney Television Alternative (2025–present); Endemol USA (2004–2012); Endemol Shine North America (2020; 2025–present); Greengrass Productions (2003–2012; 2025–present)

Original release
- Network: ABC
- Release: February 15, 2004 – January 13, 2012
- Network: HGTV
- Release: February 16 – April 5, 2020
- Network: ABC
- Release: January 2 – February 20, 2025

Extreme Makeover: Home Edition (EM:HE; sometimes informally referred to as Extreme Home Makeover) is an American reality television series that aired from February 15, 2004, to January 13, 2012, on ABC and in 2020 on HGTV. It premiered on January 2, 2025, for its tenth season on ABC and its eleventh season overall. The series is a spin-off of Extreme Makeover that features a family, which has faced some sort of hardship, having their home completely remodeled to better suit their exact needs. The pilot aired in December 2003.

The series was produced by Endemol USA in association with Disney–ABC Television Group's Greengrass Television. The original ABC run was hosted by Ty Pennington; the HGTV season was hosted by actor Jesse Tyler Ferguson. The executive producers in the original series were Brady Connell and George Verschoor. On May 7, 2024, the series was revived again and returned to ABC for the first time since 2012, with Joanna Teplin and Clea Shearer from the website The Home Edit as co-hosts.

The program originally aired on Sunday evenings, but was moved to Friday nights during the 2011–12 television season. Upon the airing of its final episode in series form during its original run, and for the 2012 special holiday run, it was ABC's last series to air solely in 4:3 standard definition. However, when the show was revived by HGTV, it was converted into high definition and widescreen presentation.

== Overview ==
Extreme Makeover: Home Edition premiered as a thirteen-part special on Wednesday, December 3, 2003, and had its official series premiere on Sunday, February 15, 2004. It was among ABC's top-rated series and has become far more popular than the original Extreme Makeover, which struggled in the ratings through its last two seasons and quietly ended with its episodes burned off wholesale in July 2007. The show ranked 41st in its first season, averaging 10.6 million viewers per episode, with the pilot episode bringing in 12 million viewers. However its ratings soared thereafter with the second season entering the top 20, finishing 15th for the year, averaging 15.8 million viewers per episode. The next four seasons each ranked at least in the top 30, with seasons two and three ranking in the top 20, and seasons four and five ranking in the top 25. The sixth season, however, fell out of the top 35, and ranked 38th, averaging 10.3 million viewers per episode. The seventh season ranked 39th, averaging 9.1 million viewers. By season eight, the show barely ranked in the top 50 with just over 8.5 million viewers per episode on average. The last season ranked below the top 100 (finishing at #101) and averaged only 5.8 million viewers per episode.

Series reruns began airing on TV Land in August 2007, making it the youngest non-original show to air on the network.

The show is hosted by Ty Pennington, formerly a carpenter on the show Trading Spaces. The series is devoted to rebuilding families' homes when the family is in need of new hope.

During the 2005–06 season, the show went to areas hit by Hurricane Katrina and helped communities to rebuild themselves with help from other organizations.

The show also had a series of specials that later became a regular series during the 2004–05 television season entitled Extreme Makeover: Home Edition: How'd They Do That? It was a short-lived spin-off of Extreme Makeover: Home Edition that featured extra behind-the-scenes footage of what had happened in that week's episode. An occasional special would feature The Muppets, property of ABC, engaging in comical scenes with the design team. However, their scenes were usually filmed after the renovation.

== Episodes ==
Season	Episodes	Originally released		
Season	Episodes	First released	Last released	Network
1	13	February 15, 2004	July 18, 2004	ABC
2	24	September 26, 2004	May 22, 2005	ABC
3	26	August 14, 2005	May 21, 2006	ABC
4	25	September 17, 2006	May 20, 2007	ABC
5	26	September 30, 2007	May 18, 2008	ABC
6	25	September 28, 2008	May 17, 2009	ABC
7	24	October 11, 2009	May 22, 2010	ABC
8	22	September 26, 2010	May 15, 2011	ABC
9	13	September 25, 2011	January 13, 2012	ABC
10	10	February 16, 2020	April 5, 2020	HGTV
11	8	January 2, 2025	February 20, 2025	ABC
Specials	14	May 6, 2004	December 17, 2012	ABC

== Production ==
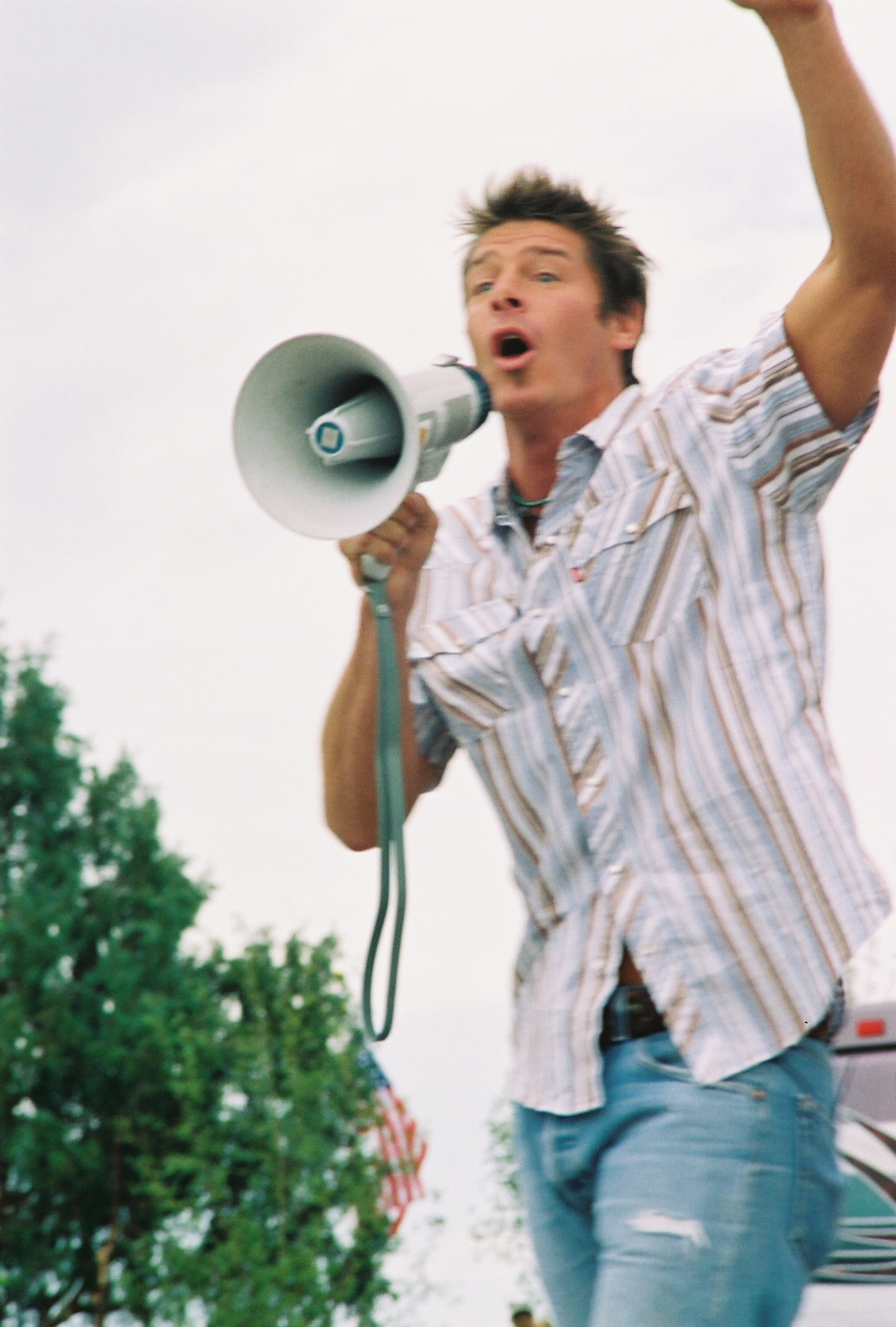
Host Ty Pennington during an episode shooting, January 2006.

Two episodes in two different cities are shot at the same time (a few days apart), using two different production crews. There are also two groups of designers. Ty Pennington flies back and forth between the cities to do the "door knock", the braveheart march, and the "reveal", as well as to finish up work on his projects, which he mentions and gives walk-throughs in his magazine. The amount of work that Ty and the design team put into the house itself and the projects they take on depend mostly on the amount of filming needed to be done. In some circumstances, such as smaller makeovers or makeovers scheduled to be two-hour episodes, the lead designers lay out a general idea for their projects, and the show's backup designers take over. Generally, the lead designers are notified in advance of the makeover recipients, to enable them to start their plans ahead of time. At several makeovers, they have been criticized for never doing any work at all, and just being there to put on a show.

=== Format ===
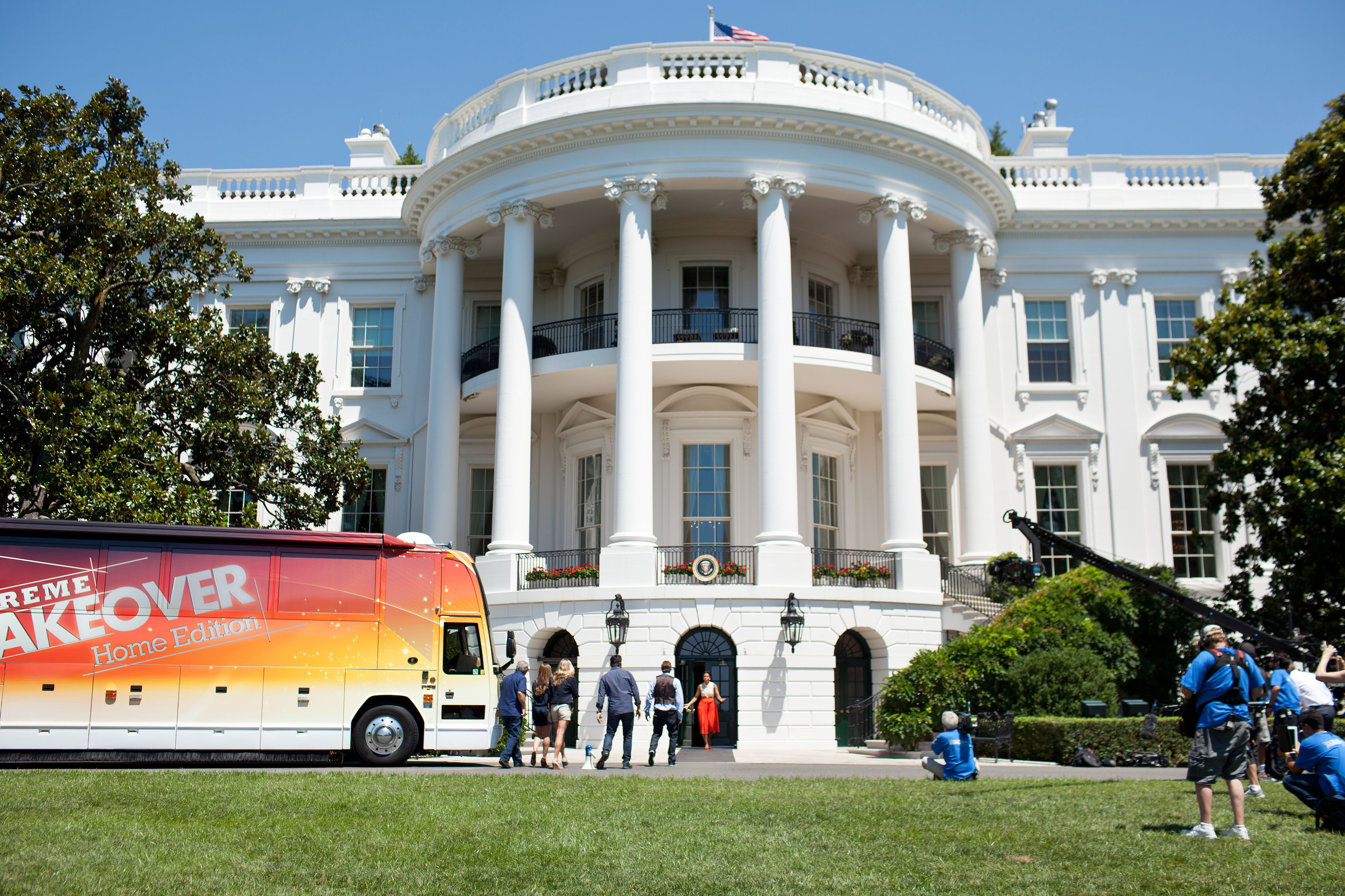
Then–first lady Michelle Obama participates in the filming of an Extreme Makeover: Home Edition episode, White House, 2011.

ABC received thousands of applications from families in need, and the team said that it was extremely hard to filter through the stories and choose only one of them. The families they looked for must have met two criteria: first, they must have been truly deserving and in need of the makeover, and second, they must have been the kind of people who gave something of themselves back to their community. The main theme of the show was advocacy, as each family that was selected helped to address a wide range of issues in American society. The show had helped families who had been victimized by a form of loss or tragic event, experienced a certain hardship and most of all, advocated on ways to treat, face and prevent such losses. The show helped families of veterans, single parents, and families with children who had illnesses ranging from childhood cancers to HIV/AIDS, as well as children with mental illnesses and disabilities such as autism. The show helped families victimized by natural disasters such as tornadoes and hurricanes, as well as families who had dealt with house fires and mold contamination. Other instances included families who had either lost loved ones or had loved ones injured in car accidents (including alcohol-related incidents), domestic violence, gang-related crimes and drug abuse. Every episode made a family stand as an advocate of awareness of such problems.

The majority of episodes were one hour; however, in some instances (mainly if complications were involved, or if the makeover involved more than just the family home) the episode was aired as a two-parter and started at 7 p.m. Eastern Time (one hour ahead of its normal 8 p.m. Eastern Time slot). In the UK and some countries, some of the two‑hour episodes aired as one single program instead of as two separate parts.

The first season of Extreme Makeover: Home Edition took place mostly in Southern California, particularly Greater Los Angeles. Season two extended the renovation outside California and beyond, including Alaska and Hawaii.

Most shows in the first three seasons began with a shot of Pennington in the team's bus saying, "I'm Ty Pennington, and the renovation starts right now!" The exceptions were those episodes which featured a guest host in his place.

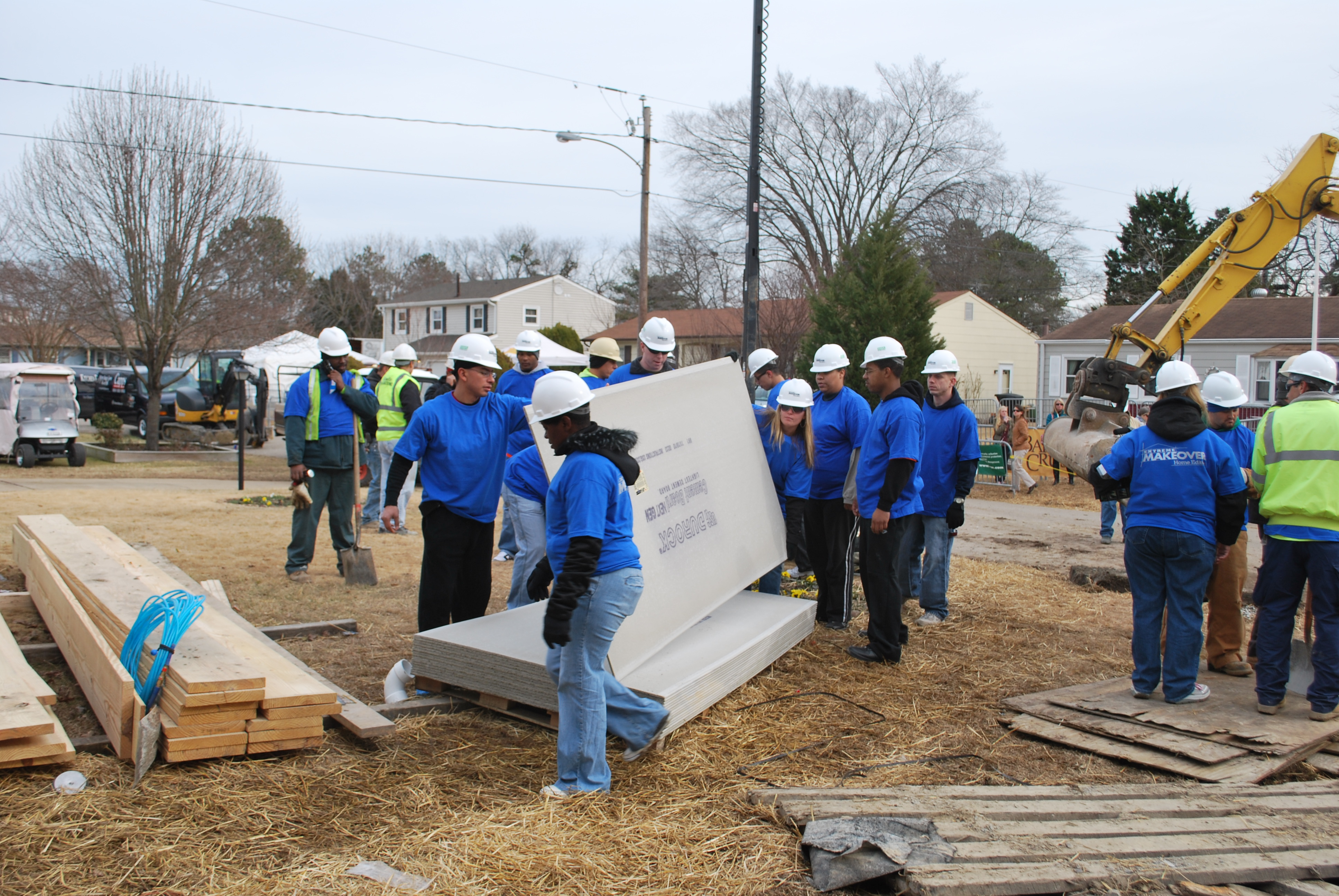
U.S. Navy Sailors (CVN-71) help build a home in an episode of Extreme Home Makeover: Home Edition, Virginia Beach, Va., 2011.

In the fourth and fifth seasons, the opening shot was of Pennington in a location iconic of the state the episode was in, and a declaration of what state the episode was in was added to the tagline. Then, the chosen family was briefly profiled; their nomination video was shown to the team (and to the television audience).

Pennington then brought the team together in a huddle and led them in a chant of "Let's do it!" Next, Pennington and the design team visited the family's home and proceeded to give the family a "wake-up call" (courtesy of Pennington's infamous bullhorn) by shouting "Good morning, [family's name] family!" then introduced each family member. The team then went throughout the house, finding out about the family's interests as design inspiration.

The family was then sent off on a one-week vacation (where applicable, airfare was provided by Southwest Airlines, whose involvement was noted at the end of the show, mostly Disneyland) while the house was renovated or demolished, depending on its condition and the family's needs. Two families in separate seasons (The Sears Family, season 2, episode 13; and The Kubena Family, season 3, episode 17) did not include vacations because their respective family's daughters were in isolation at each local hospital. They received video messages via laptop computer from Pennington's camera. The videos displayed on the laptop were superimposed on broadcasts to avoid both screen glare and the requirement of paying advertising royalties on the software used in the videos.

Beginning with season 3, the demolitions became quite creative: the team had used falling trees, tanks, and even monster trucks to accomplish the task where needed. In one episode (The Miller Family, season 5, episode 7), the team used dynamite to blow up their radon-contaminated house in Wyoming. In 2008, a rather innovative episode showed Pennington and his team rolling a five hundred pound bowling ball through the house to eventually demolish a family's "bowling-themed, Big Lebowski–inspired" bathroom.

A local home builder (sometimes two builders) and community volunteers began basic work (electrical, plumbing, roofing, and, if the house was demolished, framing a new one) while the design team began designing the creative aspects of the house. Once the basic work was completed, the design team then added the finishing touches. Pennington selected a portion of the house to be his "secret room" (except in the case when the secret project took place in the backyard), which no one was allowed to view prior to final reveal (with one exception in The Pauni Family, season 4, episode 10, which involved a commercial kitchen; the health inspector had to approve the kitchen and issue the permit before it could be used). Shows often featured design team members making a trip to a local Sears store as well as special guest appearances. The IQAir Clean Air Team was often called in to provide ultra-clean air for families with special health issues.

At the end of the week, the family returned to their home to see cheering crowds and the view of their home blocked by a bus (for larger projects, two buses would block the home). When Pennington and the family gave the order, originally "Bus driver, hit it!" in season 1 (usually only called by Pennington), and later the much more famous, "Bus driver, move that bus!!" (or "those buses!!"), starting in season 2, with the family participating in the call to the bus driver, the family saw the end result of the team's efforts. Pennington's secret room was usually the last item featured on the show. Often, a child's bedroom, the parent's master bedroom or a business room received Pennington's special attention. Some episodes featured special gifts given to the family by outside parties. The show always ended with Pennington saying, "There's only one thing left to say: welcome home [family's name] family, welcome home". This was often followed by a standing ovation from the family, design team, and whoever else was there as the show ends.

== Team ==
Cast	Role
ABC version (original; 2004–12)
Alle Ghadban	Design (season 1)
Constance Ramos	Architect (seasons 1–3)
Dawson Connor	Landscaping (season 1)
Michael Moloney	Interior Design/Glamour (seasons 1–9)
Paige Hemmis	Carpentry (seasons 1–9)
Paul DiMeo	Carpentry (seasons 1–9)
Preston Sharp	Exteriors/Big Ideas (seasons 1–4)
Tracy Hutson	Shopping/Style (seasons 1–9)
Ty Pennington	Host/Design Team Leader/Carpentry (seasons 1–9)
Ed Sanders	Carpentry (seasons 2–9)
Eduardo Xol	Landscaping (seasons 2–8)
Daniel Kucan	Interior Design (season 3)
Tanya McQueen	Interior Design (seasons 3–5)
John Littlefield	Carpentry (seasons 4–9)
Didiayer Snyder	Design (seasons 5–7)
Rib Hillis	Carpentry (seasons 5–6)
Jillian Harris	Designer (seasons 7–9)
Xzibit	Designer (seasons 7–9)
Leigh Anne Tuohy	Designer (season 8)
Jeff Dye	Designer (season 9)
Sabrina Soto	Designer (season 9)
HGTV version (2020)
Breegan Jane	Carpentry (season 10)
Carrie Locklyn	Shopping/Style (season 10)
Darren Keefe	Carpentry (season 10)
Jesse Tyler Ferguson	Host/Design Team Leader (season 10)
ABC version (revival; 2025)
Joanna Teplin	Host (season 11)
Clea Shearer	Host (season 11)
Wendell Holland	Designer (season 11)
Arianne Bellizaire	Designer (season 11)

== Reaction and criticism ==
Despite the show's positive message, EM:HE has been scrutinized for several issues, including the show's ethics, its authenticity, and leaving some families with an increase in mortgage payments and property taxes due to higher assessments and worsening their circumstances.

Ethically speaking, the show has often been criticized by some viewers and the media for unnecessary contributions and glorifying excessive McMansion-like construction and lifestyles, such as in a Mother Jones article that questioned giving a six-bedroom, seven-bath, seven-television house to a family of four in Kingston, Washington.

Authentically speaking, one such claim was frequently made against the show's lead designers, particularly Ty Pennington. At several makeovers, they have been criticized for never doing any work at all, with anonymous contractors mostly doing the work and the designers performing only light work for the cameras. In 2007, during the makeover for the Carter Family in Billings, Montana, a local radio DJ accused Pennington of using a spray can of grease on his face to make it look like he was really working, only to be confronted over the air by Pennington himself, who called in from the construction site. The largest piece of evidence to prove the design team's contribution to the house and the family is a severe hand injury that Ed Sanders received during a 2006 makeover in Ohio for the family of Jason Thomas. While creating a wood carving of the American flag, Sanders removed part of the guard for a hand-held wood grinder, which led to him slicing one of his hands open.

In an article entitled "ABC's 'Extreme Exploitation'", The Smoking Gun published an e-mail sent on March 10, 2006, from an ABC employee sent to the network's affiliate base, relaying a message from the program's casting agent detailing specific tragedies and rare illnesses sought by the show. Included were a "Muscular Dystrophy Child", a "Family who has multiple children w/ Down Syndrome (either adopted or biological)" and a child with a congenital insensitivity to pain with anhidrosis. This last request included a parenthetical remark stating, "There are only 17 known cases in US - let me know if one is in your town!" This e-mail has led some major media networks and blogs to accuse the show of opportunism in seeking out the most sensational stories in a push for higher ratings.

Another criticism aimed at the show surrounds financial issues that some of the families have had after receiving the home makeover, which, following the onset of the Great Recession, received media attention. As of 2020, nine of the original show's recipient families have given up their homes due to financial issues, including two foreclosures. While most cases were reported as resulting from instances such as unemployment, accumulations of medical bills, or property tax rate increases, the most widely publicized cases featured families who had defaulted on home equity loans taken out on their homes since receiving them, one of which resulted in a foreclosure. In a 2018 interview with TheWrap, Pennington explained the nature of these cases. "There's a couple of stories that families lost their home. We left them with a financial adviser. However, if the family chooses to triple-mortgage their house to start a business that they've never done before just to see if they can get into it, that's their own demise. That's how you lose your home, is you're like, 'Oh, let's use it as a lottery ticket and see what we can get out of it. And then you lose it because you can't make the payment. But that's what press does. They were like, 'This is too good to be true, what is really happening?' But with 'Extreme', it really was that good."

The five children of the Higgins family, aged 14–21, filed a lawsuit against ABC after they were evicted by a family that had taken them in before the show came to renovate the family's house. The five children "say that the producers took advantage of the family's hard-luck story and promised them new cars and other prizes to persuade them to participate in the program", according to the LA Times. On July 17, 2007, Judge Paul Gutman ruled against the siblings, stating that the plaintiffs failed to prove their case. The decision of the trial court was affirmed on appeal. The case was later settled for $50,000.

Questions arose when Theresa "Momi" Akana was picked for a Hawaii-set episode. The Honolulu Advertiser investigated her family's tax records and found out that she and her husband each made over $100,000 in salary. Denise Cramsey, the executive producer of the show, responded that "I think Momi certainly fits the bill." She defended the choice by stating that the show looks beyond the family's finances and considers other factors, including family plight and contributions to the community.

== Spin-off ==
Another spinoff, Extreme Makeover: Home Edition: How'd They Do That?, aired for one season between November 1, 2004 and May 23, 2005; it featured extra behind-the-scenes footage of what had happened in that week's episode.

== Broadcast ==
On December 15, 2011, ABC announced that Extreme Makeover: Home Edition would end its run on January 13, 2012, but continue to air network specials.

Reruns of the series aired on Discovery Family from April 2020 to September 2022.

== Reboots ==
On January 15, 2019, HGTV announced that they would be reviving the series; the revival premiered on February 16, 2020, running for 10 episodes until April 5, 2020.

On June 5, 2023, it was announced that another revival of Extreme Makeover: Home Edition was in development at ABC. On May 7, 2024, the series was ordered with Clea Shearer and Joanna Teplin as hosts. The revival premiered on January 2, 2025.

== International versions ==
This list includes both officially licensed versions and so-called copies of this show, mostly inspired by that, but not licensed by Endemol Shine Group, the current owner of the format.

Country	Title	Broadcaster	Host	Original run	Source(s)
Albania	Nga e Para	Vizion Plus	Anila Çela	April 16, 2019	
Argentina	Extreme Makeover: Home Edition Argentina	Telefe	Andy Kusnetzoff	November 11, 2013	
Belgium	Extreme Makeover: Vlaanderen	Play4	James Cooke	October 1, 2022 – October 12, 2023	
Brazil	Extreme Makeover Social	RecordTV	Cristiana Arcangeli	September 25, 2010 – December 15, 2012	
Brazil	Extreme Makeover Brasil: Casa dos Sonhos	GNT	Otaviano Costa	March 10, 2020 – present	
Bulgaria	Бригада нов дом	bTV	Maria Silvester	March 10, 2016 – present	
Czech Republic	Jak se staví sen	TV Prima	Pavel Cejnar	September 12, 2007	
Czech Republic	Mise nový domov	TV Nova	Tereza Pergnerová	October 16, 2016	
France	Tous ensemble	TF1	Marc-Emmanuel Dufour	October 3, 2009 – June 20, 2015	
France	Tous pour un	NRJ 12	Alexandra Holzhammer, Valérie Aparicio, Laura Olivier	January 1 – June 20, 2017	
Greece	Extreme Makeover: Home Edition	ANT1	Spiros Soulis	November 20, 2026	
Italy	Extreme Makeover: Home Edition Italia	Canale 5	Alessia Marcuzzi	January 23, 2013 – June 23, 2014	
Israel	Extreme Makeover Israel	Channel 10	Amos Tamam	June 12, 2013 – 2014	
Norway	Ekstrem oppussing	TV3	Asgeir Borgemoen	April 3 – December 18, 2005	
Philippines	Extreme Makeover: Home Edition Philippines	TV5	Paolo Bediones	April 15 – June 17, 2012	
Poland	Nasz nowy dom	Polsat	Katarzyna Dowbor (2013–2023); Elżbieta Romanowska (2023–present)	September 29, 2013 – present	
Romania	Visuri la cheie	Pro TV	Dragoș Bucur (2014–2017, 2019–present) Corneliu Ulici (2018)	October 29, 2014 – present	
Serbia	Radna akcija	Prva TV	Tamara Grujić	December 11, 2010 – July 15, 2016	
Serbia	S Tamarom u akciji Radna Akcija sa Tamarom	RTS 1 Prva TV	Tamara Grujić	March 11, 2016 – present	
Serbia	Kuća od srca	B92; RTV Pink	Žarko Lazić	September 22, 2014 – present	
Spain	Esta casa era una ruina	Antena 3	Jorge Fernández	| scope="row" | Turkey | Yeni Evimiz | Kanal D | Ertem Șener | November 24, 2026 | style="text-align:center;" | |}	
Ukraine	Время строить	Inter	Oksana Marchenko	December 2 – 23, 2017	

== See also ==
- Mitre 10 Dream Home
- My Lottery Dream Home
- Prize home lottery
- Show house
