= Dream Home (Australian TV series) =

- Genre: Reality television
- Based on: Mitre 10 Dream Home by David Baldock
- Presented by: Chris Brown
- Judges: Simon Cohen; Rosie Morley; Lana Taylor
- Country of origin: Australia
- Original language: English
- No. of series: 1
- No. of episodes: 20

Production
- Production company: Endemol Shine Australia

Original release
- Network: Seven Network
- Release: 26 May – 9 July 2024

Dream Home is an Australian reality television series based on the New Zealand series Mitre 10 Dream Home, which premiered on 26 May 2024 on the Seven Network. The series follows state-based teams of two who renovate each other's homes, with the team receiving the highest score winning $100k off their mortgage. The series is hosted by Dr Chris Brown.

Although the series was not renewed for a second season at Seven's annual upfronts in November 2024, it may return in the future. However, the series was quietly shelved due to production costs. In 2026, a new renovation show from the same production team, titled My Reno Rules was announced, with Chris Brown returning as host and Simon Cohen judging.

== Production ==
On 11 May 2023, a casting call for a new, untitled renovation show was announced by Endemol Shine Australia. On 16 May 2023, it was announced that the Seven Network would be adapting the series, titled Dream Home to be produced by Endemol Shine Australia, to air in 2024. In June 2023, it was confirmed that Dr Chris Brown would host the series. In March 2024, buyer's agent Simon Cohen, interior designer Rosie Morley, and Lana Taylor of Three Birds Renovations were announced as series judges.

== Teams ==
Team	Relationship	House location	Occupation	Status
Rhys & Liam Almond	Brothers	Deception Bay, Queensland	Tradies	Winners
Lara & Peter Bird	Married with children	Belrose, New South Wales	Wedding florist & marine electrician	Runners-up
Taeler & Ellie Jordan	Sisters	Watsonia North, Victoria	Architect & HR advisor	Third place
Hannah & Jonny	New parents	Coorparoo, Queensland	Digital marketing & DJ	Eliminated (NSW Round 2)
Brad & Mel Pinto	Married with children	Northcote, Victoria	Songwriter/musician & shopping centre delivery manager	Eliminated (NSW Round 2)
Jacinta & Jordan	Married with children	Punchbowl, New South Wales	Brow specialist and tax accountant	Eliminated (NSW Round 2)

== Elimination history ==
Teams' progress through the competition
Phase:	Interior renovations							Grand Finale	
Phase:	VIC Houses		QLD Houses		NSW Houses		Round Total (out of 180)	Backyard	
Team	Scores						Round Total (out of 180)	Round Total (out of 40)	Result
Rhys & Liam	26	20	27	27	28	21	3rd (149)	37.5	Winners
Lara & Peter	22.5	26.5	26.5	28.5	23.5	24.5	1st (152)	37	Runners-Up
Taeler & Ellie	24.5	26	30	26	19	24	2nd (149.5)	31	Third Place
Jacinta & Jordan	23	25.5	23	19	25.5	29	4th (145)	Eliminated (Episode 19)	
Hannah & Jonny	23.5	22.5	24.5	28	24	22	5th (144.5)	Eliminated (Episode 19)	
Brad & Mel	20	25.5	22	25.5	25	20.5	6th (138.5)	Eliminated (Episode 19)	

=== House evaluation ===
At the end of the full house reveal, each house is reevaluated and given a new selling price.

Interior Renovation House Evaluation
Team	Evaluation		Added Value
Team	Before Renovation	After Renovation	Added Value
Taeler & Ellie	$800,000	$1,300,000	$500,000
Brad & Mel	$1,400,000	$2,800,000	$1,400,000
Hannah & Jonny	$900,000	$1,900,000	$1,000,000
Rhys & Liam	$600,000	$1,600,000	$1,000,000
Lara & Peter	$2,250,000	$2,950,000	$700,000
Jacinta & Jordan	$1,000,000	$2,000,000	$1,000,000

== Series details ==
The six teams are challenged to transform the interiors and front facades of each other's homes. Each house is split over two rounds. In the first round, three teams are allocated to a home (that does not belong to them) and are given two and a half weeks to renovate the rooms they are allocated based on a design brief given by the homeowners. In the second round, each team must renovate the remaining rooms in each house in seven days. Once all rounds are complete, the top scoring three teams overall will move onto the final round, which is backyard renovations, where the highest scoring team will receive $100,000 off their mortgage.

=== Interior renovations ===
==== Victoria Houses ====
===== Round 1 =====
- Episodes 1 to 4
- Airdate — 26 May to 2 June
- Description — In round 1, three teams head to Taeler and Ellie's House in Watsonia & Brad and Mel's house in Northcote. Each team must deliver their first set of rooms based on the homeowners design briefs and deliver the rooms after two and a half weeks. The winners at the end of the round received $5,000.

Team	House	Rooms allocated	Scores			Total (out of 30)	Running Total (VIC round 1)
Team	House	Rooms allocated	Lana	Rosie	Simon	Total (out of 30)	Running Total (VIC round 1)
Hannah & Jonny	Brad & Mel's (Northcote, VIC)	Living Room & Bedroom Two	8	7.5	8	23.5	23.5 / 30
Taeler & Ellie	Brad & Mel's (Northcote, VIC)	Bathroom & Bedroom 4	8.5	8	8	24.5	24.5 / 30
Jacinta & Jordan	Brad & Mel's (Northcote, VIC)	Dining Room & Kitchen	8	7	8	23	23 / 30
Rhys & Liam	Taeler & Ellie's (Watsonia, VIC)	Kitchen, Dining, Pantry & Laundry	8.5	9	8.5	26	26 / 30
Lara & Peter	Taeler & Ellie's (Watsonia, VIC)	Living Room & Bedroom Two	8	7.5	7	22.5	22.5 / 30
Brad & Mel	Taeler & Ellie's (Watsonia, VIC)	Main Bedroom & Bathroom	7	6.5	6.5	20	20 / 30

===== Round 2 =====
- Episodes 5 to 7
- Airdate — 3 to 9 June
- Description — In round 2, the teams head back to Taeler and Ellie's House in Watsonia & Brad and Mel's house in Northcote to renovate their second rooms. They must each deliver rooms based on the homeowners design briefs and deliver the rooms after seven days. The winners at the end of the round received $5,000.

Team	House	Rooms allocated	Scores			Total (out of 30)	Running Total (VIC round 1 & 2)
Team	House	Rooms allocated	Lana	Rosie	Simon	Total (out of 30)	Running Total (VIC round 1 & 2)
Hannah & Jonny	Brad & Mel's (Northcote, VIC)	Hallway & Girls Bedroom 2	7.5	7	8	22.5	46 / 60
Taeler & Ellie	Brad & Mel's (Northcote, VIC)	Facade & Girls Bedroom 1	8.5	9	8.5	26	50.5 / 60
Jacinta & Jordan	Brad & Mel's (Northcote, VIC)	Laundry, Master Bedroom & Walk-in robe	8.5	8.5	8.5	25.5	48.5 / 60
Rhys & Liam	Taeler & Ellie's (Watsonia, VIC)	Study, Bedroom Hallway & Ensuite	7	6.5	6.5	20	46 / 60
Lara & Peter	Taeler & Ellie's (Watsonia, VIC)	Main Hallway & Facade	9.5	8	9	26.5	49 / 60
Brad & Mel	Taeler & Ellie's (Watsonia, VIC)	Master Bedroom & Walk-in robe	8	8.5	9	25.5	45.5 / 60

==== Queensland Houses ====
===== Round 1 =====
- Episodes 8 to 10
- Airdate — 10 to 16 June
- Description — In round 1, three teams head to Hannah and Jonny's House in Coorparoo & Rhys and Liam's house in Deception Bay. Each team must deliver their first set of rooms based on the homeowners design briefs and deliver the rooms after two and a half weeks. The winners at the end of the round received $5,000.

Team	House	Rooms allocated	Scores			Total (out of 30)	Running Total (VIC round 1 to QLD round 1)
Team	House	Rooms allocated	Lana	Rosie	Simon	Total (out of 30)	Running Total (VIC round 1 to QLD round 1)
Hannah & Jonny	Rhys & Liam’s (Deception Bay, QLD)	Kitchen & Guest Bedroom	8	8.5	8	24.5	70.5 / 90
Brad & Mel	Rhys & Liam’s (Deception Bay, QLD)	Dining Room & Bathroom	8	7.5	6.5	22	67.5 / 90
Jordan & Jacinta	Rhys & Liam’s (Deception Bay, QLD)	Living Room & Laundry	7.5	7.5	8	23	71.5 / 90
Rhys & Liam	Hannah & Jonny’s (Coorparoo, QLD)	Living Room & Laundry	8.5	9	9.5	27	73 / 90
Taeler & Ellie	Hannah & Jonny’s (Coorparoo, QLD)	Bathroom & Dining Room	10	10	10	30	80.5 / 90
Lara & Peter	Hannah & Jonny’s (Coorparoo, QLD)	Kitchen & Guest Bedroom	9	9	8.5	26.5	75.5 / 90

===== Round 2 =====
- Episodes 11 to 13
- Airdate — 17 to 23 June
- Description — In round 2, the teams head back to Hannah and Jonny's House in Coorparoo & Rhys and Liam's house in Deception Bay. Each team must deliver their remaining set of rooms based on the homeowners design briefs and deliver the rooms after seven days. The winners at the end of the round received $5,000.

Team	House	Rooms allocated	Scores			Total (out of 30)	Running Total (VIC round 1 to QLD round 2)
Team	House	Rooms allocated	Lana	Rosie	Simon	Total (out of 30)	Running Total (VIC round 1 to QLD round 2)
Hannah & Jonny	Rhys & Liam’s (Deception Bay, QLD)	Facade & Downstairs Bathroom	9.5	9.5	9	28	98.5 / 120
Brad & Mel	Rhys & Liam’s (Deception Bay, QLD)	Nursery & Ensuite	8.5	8.5	8.5	25.5	93 / 120
Jordan & Jacinta	Rhys & Liam’s (Deception Bay, QLD)	Master Bedroom, WIR & Entry	6.5	6	6.5	19	90.5 / 120
Rhys & Liam	Hannah & Jonny’s (Coorparoo, QLD)	Bathroom, Facade & Balcony	9	9	9	27	100 / 120
Taeler & Ellie	Hannah & Jonny’s (Coorparoo, QLD)	Master Bedroom, WIR & Entry	8	9	9	26	106.5 / 120
Lara & Peter	Hannah & Jonny’s (Coorparoo, QLD)	Nursery, Wallway & Ensuite	9.5	9	10	28.5	104 / 120

==== New South Wales Houses ====
===== Round 1 =====
- Episodes 14 to 16
- Airdate — 24 to 30 June
- Description — In round 1, three teams head to Jacinta and Jordan's House in Punchbowl & Lara and Peter's house in Belrose. Each team must deliver their first set of rooms based on the homeowners design briefs and deliver the rooms after two and a half weeks. The winners at the end of the round received $5,000.

Team	House	Rooms allocated	Scores			Total (out of 30)	Running Total (VIC round 1 to NSW round 1)
Team	House	Rooms allocated	Lana	Rosie	Simon	Total (out of 30)	Running Total (VIC round 1 to NSW round 1)
Lara & Peter	Jacinta & Jordan’s (Punchbowl, NSW)	Dining Room, Master Bedroom & WIR	8	8	7.5	23.5	127.5 / 150
Hannah & Jonny	Jacinta & Jordan’s (Punchbowl, NSW)	Living Room & Ensuite	8	8	8	24	122.5 / 150
Taeler & Ellie	Jacinta & Jordan’s (Punchbowl, NSW)	Kitchen, Pantry, Laundry & Powder Room	6.5	6.5	6	19	125.5 / 150
Jacinta & Jordan	Lara & Peter’s (Belrose, NSW)	Living Room & Ensuite	8.5	8	9	25.5	116 / 150
Rhys & Liam	Lara & Peter’s (Belrose, NSW)	Kitchen, Laundry & Bathroom	9	9.5	9.5	28	128 / 150
Brad & Mel	Lara & Peter’s (Belrose, NSW)	Master Bedroom, WIR & Dining Room	9	8	8	25	118 / 150

===== Round 2 =====
- Episodes 17 to 19
- Airdate — 1 to 8 July
- Description — In round 2, the teams head back to Jacinta and Jordan's House in Punchbowl & Lara and Peter's house in Belrose. Each team must deliver the remaining rooms based on the homeowners design briefs and deliver the rooms after seven days. The highest scoring team received $10k to keep. The lowest overall scoring three teams will be eliminated while the highest overall scoring teams will go into the final round, backyard renovations.

Team	House	Rooms allocated	Scores			Total (out of 30)	Final Total (VIC round 1 to NSW round 2)
Team	House	Rooms allocated	Lana	Rosie	Simon	Total (out of 30)	Final Total (VIC round 1 to NSW round 2)
Lara & Peter	Jacinta & Jordan’s (Punchbowl, NSW)	Bathroom & Kids Bedroom	8	8	8.5	24.5	1st (152)
Hannah & Jonny	Jacinta & Jordan’s (Punchbowl, NSW)	Facade & Entry Hall	8	7	7	22	5th (144.5)
Taeler & Ellie	Jacinta & Jordan’s (Punchbowl, NSW)	Living Room & Kids Bedroom	8	8	8	24	2nd (149.5)
Jacinta & Jordan	Lara & Peter’s (Belrose, NSW)	Facade & Entryway	9.5	9.5	10	29	4th (145)
Rhys & Liam	Lara & Peter’s (Belrose, NSW)	Bathroom & Kids Bedroom	7	7	7	21	3rd (149)
Brad & Mel	Lara & Peter’s (Belrose, NSW)	Living Room & Kids Bedroom	7	7	6.5	20.5	6th (138.5)

=== Grand Finale ===
==== Backyard renovations ====
- Episode 20
- Airdate — 9 July
- Description — In the final round, the top three teams will return to their own homes and renovate their backyards, the leaderboard will be wiped clean. The eliminated teams return and will also give a collective score for each team. The highest scoring team at the end of the round will receive $100,000 off their mortgage.

Team	Team house location	Backyard areas	Scores				Total (out of 40)
Team	Team house location	Backyard areas	Lana	Rosie	Simon	Eliminated teams	Total (out of 40)
Rhys & Liam^{1}	Deception Bay, QLD	Deck, pool, cubby house & firepit	9	9.5	9.5	9.5	37.5
Lara & Peter	Belrose, NSW	Mediterranean-style entertaining area & pool	9.5	9	9	9.5	37
Taeler & Ellie	Watsonia North, VIC	Deck, alfresco area, firepit & spa	8	7.5	7.5	8	31

Notes

- ^1As Liam's house was the one being renovated on the series, they decided that Rhys would receive the $100k off his mortgage.

== Ratings ==
Wk.	Ep no.	Episode titles by stage of season			Air date	Timeslot	National reach viewers (millions)	National total viewers (millions)	Night rank	Source
1	1	Victoria Houses (Brad & Mel's and Taeler & Ellie's)	Round 1	Introduction	26 May 2024	Sunday 7:00 pm	2.253	0.950	2	
1	2	Victoria Houses (Brad & Mel's and Taeler & Ellie's)	Round 1	Renovations underway	27 May 2024	Monday 7:30 pm	1.464	0.632	7	
1	3	Victoria Houses (Brad & Mel's and Taeler & Ellie's)	Round 1	Renovations continue	28 May 2024	Tuesday 7:30 pm	1.272	0.602	8	
1	4	Victoria Houses (Brad & Mel's and Taeler & Ellie's)	Round 1	Room Reveals & Scores	2 June 2024	Sunday 7:00 pm	1.996	0.808	4	
2	5	Victoria Houses (Brad & Mel's and Taeler & Ellie's)	Round 2	Introduction	3 June 2024	Monday 7:30 pm	1.437	0.582	9	
2	6	Victoria Houses (Brad & Mel's and Taeler & Ellie's)	Round 2	Renovations underway	4 June 2024	Tuesday 7:30 pm	1.308	0.535	7	
2	7	Victoria Houses (Brad & Mel's and Taeler & Ellie's)	Round 2	Room Reveals & Scores	9 June 2024	Sunday 7:00 pm	1.131	0.443	8	
3	8	Queensland Houses (Hannah & Jonny's and Rhys & Liam’s)	Round 1	Introduction	10 June 2024	Monday 7:30 pm	1.448	0.661	7	
3	9	Queensland Houses (Hannah & Jonny's and Rhys & Liam’s)	Round 1	Renovations underway	11 June 2024	Tuesday 7:30 pm	1.340	0.581	7	
3	10	Queensland Houses (Hannah & Jonny's and Rhys & Liam’s)	Round 1	Room Reveals & Scores	16 June 2024	Sunday 7:00 pm	1.876	0.788	5	
4	11	Queensland Houses (Hannah & Jonny's and Rhys & Liam’s)	Round 2	Introduction	17 June 2024	Monday 7:30 pm	1.323	0.651	10	
4	12	Queensland Houses (Hannah & Jonny's and Rhys & Liam’s)	Round 2	Renovations underway	18 June 2024	Tuesday 7:30 pm	1.321	0.630	7	
4	13	Queensland Houses (Hannah & Jonny's and Rhys & Liam’s)	Round 2	Room Reveals & Scores	23 June 2024	Sunday 7:00 pm	1.743	0.801	4	
5	14	New South Wales; Houses (Jacinta & Jordan's and Lara & Peter’s)	Round 1	Introduction	24 June 2024	Monday 7:30 pm	1.436	0.672	7	
5	15	New South Wales; Houses (Jacinta & Jordan's and Lara & Peter’s)	Round 1	Renovations underway	25 June 2024	Tuesday 7:30 pm	1.419	0.644	4	
5	16	New South Wales; Houses (Jacinta & Jordan's and Lara & Peter’s)	Round 1	Room Reveals & Scores	30 June 2024	Sunday 7:00 pm	1.740	0.734	5	
6	17	New South Wales; Houses (Jacinta & Jordan's and Lara & Peter’s)	Round 2	Introduction	1 July 2024	Monday 7:30 pm	1.364	0.701	8	
6	18	New South Wales; Houses (Jacinta & Jordan's and Lara & Peter’s)	Round 2	Renovations underway	2 July 2024	Tuesday 7:30 pm	1.379	0.682	8	
6	19	New South Wales; Houses (Jacinta & Jordan's and Lara & Peter’s)	Round 2	Room Reveals & Final Scores	8 July 2024	Monday 7:30 pm	1.433	0.746	7	
7	20	Grand Finale (Backyard renovations)		Renovation, reveal and winners announced	9 July 2024	Tuesday 7:30 pm	1.454	0.807	6	

== Reception ==
An early review from David Knox of TV Tonight said the format is not original enough and can be easily compared to House Rules or The Block. An article from Yahoo! stated viewers also found it similar to House Rules, however viewers did enjoy the series. Ben Pobjie from The Sydney Morning Herald wrote, "But Dream Home is a kinder and gentler enterprise than that show, emphasising dreams over property values at every turn. Here the two-person teams are actually renovating each other's houses, giving lots of opportunity for tearful "we just want to give them the home of their dreams" speeches.".
