= Get Organized with The Home Edit =

- Genre: Reality show
- Based on: The Home Edit: A Guide to Organizing and Realizing Your House Goals
- Country of origin: United States
- Original language: English
- No. of seasons: 2
- No. of episodes: 16

Production
- Running time: 40–47 minutes
- Production company: Hello Sunshine

Original release
- Network: Netflix
- Release: September 9, 2020 – April 1, 2022

Get Organized with The Home Edit is a 2020 reality television series about The Home Edit, a professional organizing company founded by Clea Shearer and Joanna Teplin.

== Overview ==
Get Organized with The Home Edit follows Clea Shearer and Joanna Teplin as they transform cluttered spaces for celebrity and non-celebrity clients using The Home Edit's signature organizational methods, color coordination, and labeling systems. The series premiered on September 9, 2020, with a second season released on April 1, 2022.

The series was produced for Netflix following Master the Mess, a short-form series released through Hello Sunshine and DirecTV in 2018. The concept began with The Home Edit book, followed by home organization and lifestyle products, and the streaming series.

The Home Edit was the first acquisition of Hello Sunshine, in 2023, after it had been acquired by Candle Media, in 2022.

== Cast ==
Guest stars

- Season 1: Reese Witherspoon, Rachel Zoe, Khloe Kardashian, Eva Longoria, Retta, Neil Patrick Harris, Jordana Brewster, Kane Brown
- Season 2: Drew Barrymore, Winnie Harlow, Chris Pratt, Lauren Conrad, Kelsea Ballerini, Tyler Hubbard, Kevin Hart

== Episodes ==
=== Series overview ===
| Season | Episodes | Originally released |
|---|---|---|
| 1 | 8 | September 9, 2020 |
| 2 | 8 | 1 April 2022 |

=== Season 1 (2020) ===
| No. overall | No. in season | Title | Original release date |
|---|---|---|---|
| 1 | 1 | "Reese Witherspoon and a Doctor's Dream Closet" | September 9, 2020 |
Reese Witherspoon hires Clea and Joanna to help display some of her memorable movie and TV looks. The team revives a pediatrician’s cluttered closet.
| 2 | 2 | "Rachel Zoe and a Multipurpose Garage" | September 9, 2020 |
The duo returns to Rachel Zoe’s closet to tame her clothes, bags and shoes. A family's chaotic garage turns into an orderly and defined space.
| 3 | 3 | "Khloé Kardashian and a Bedroom Overhaul" | September 9, 2020 |
The team reimagines Khloé Kardashian's garage, creating organized zones. A vibrant event planner gets a bedroom to match her personality.
| 4 | 4 | "Eva Longoria and a Kitchen for Five" | September 9, 2020 |
Eva Longoria moves her son into a big-boy room and wants to revamp his closet. A family of five needs help with a kitchen bursting at the seams.
| 5 | 5 | "Retta and a Converted Office" | September 9, 2020 |
Retta calls on Clea and Joanna to set up a "leisure lounge." An office full of boxes blossoms into a peaceful retreat for parents with three boys.
| 6 | 6 | "Neil Patrick Harris and a Brooklyn Kitchen" | September 9, 2020 |
Neil Patrick Harris and husband David Burtka want to redo their twins’ basement playroom. The team gets cooking in a family's overcrowded kitchen.
| 7 | 7 | "Jordana Brewster and a Youth Center" | September 9, 2020 |
The pair tackles storage in Jordana Brewster’s pantry, fridge and freezer. A neighborhood after-school program gets a dazzling, color-coded makeover.
| 8 | 8 | "Kane Brown and Two Siblings' Shared Bedroom" | September 9, 2020 |
Country music star Kane Brown and his wife want their pantry to sing. Clea and Joanna work their magic to maximize a bedroom for two growing boys.

=== Season 2 (2022) ===
| No. overall | No. in season | Title | Original release date |
|---|---|---|---|
| 9 | 1 | "Drew Barrymore & An Atlanta Pantry" | 1 April 2022 |
The Home Edit team highlights healthy snacks in a family's jumbled pantry then tackles a crowded test kitchen on the set of The Drew Barrymore Show.
| 10 | 2 | "Winnie Harlow & A Little Girl’s Bedroom" | 1 April 2022 |
After getting a glam room in order for trailblazing supermodel Winnie Harlow, Clea and Joanna give a 9-year-old superfan a surprise bedroom makeover.
| 11 | 3 | "Chris Pratt & A Home Office" | 1 April 2022 |
Joanna and Clea divide Katherine Schwarzenegger and Chris Pratt's garage into zones. Busy clients who are giving back to the community need storage.
| 12 | 4 | "Lauren Conrad, Kelsea Ballerini & A Kids’ Bedroom" | 1 April 2022 |
The team streamlines spaces for celeb entrepreneur Lauren Conrad, country star Kelsea Ballerini, and a family of four living in a two-bedroom condo.
| 13 | 5 | "Danielle Brooks & A Multi-Purpose Room" | 1 April 2022 |
Clea and Joanna design a "mom cave" for actress Danielle Brooks and then help a modern family contain the clutter in their historical 1930s home.
| 14 | 6 | "Florida Georgia Playroom & An Open-Face Closet" | 1 April 2022 |
Florida Georgia Line's Tyler Hubbard wants a colorful playroom for his kids. A teacher living in the city needs to get her new apartment in order.
| 15 | 7 | "Topper Guild & A Creative Studio" | 1 April 2022 |
The team helps a young family make the house they inherited feel like their own and creates a "prank lounge" for teen TikTok star Topper Guild.
| 16 | 8 | "Kevin Hart & A Guest House Office" | 1 April 2022 |
A selfless single mom gets the office of her dreams. Later, the crew edits a massive sneaker collection for one of Kevin Hart's good friends.

== Reception ==
Hillary Kelly from Curbed compares Get Organized with The Home Edit with Tidying Up with Marie Kondo: "If viewers see in Marie Kondo the pursuit of a pared-back Japanese aesthetic, Get Organized represents the tenacious way Americans hold onto and celebrate their excess — we want to keep our stuff and make it pretty, too, dammit." According to Marshall Bright from Refinery29, "[i]f KonMari can be summed up as “sparking joy,” The Home Edit only needs one word: product. ... the appeal is immaculate, often rainbow-ordered rows of things, displayed in and on product, product, and yet more product. ... If Kondo may produce trash from the disposal of existing possessions, The Home Edit is asking us to parade more future landfill waste into our homes."
