= Endemol Shine Australia =

Television production company

Endemol Shine Australia Pty Ltd.
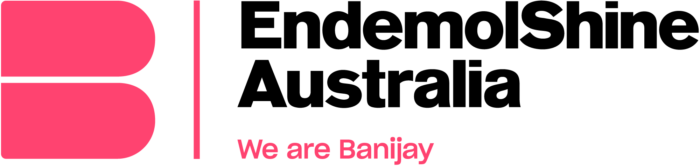
- Formerly: Shine Australia (2010–2015)
- Type: Subsidiary
- Industry: Television production
- Predecessor: Endemol Australia; Endemol Southern Star
- Founded: 2010; 16 years ago
- Headquarters: Sydney, Australia
- Key people: Peter Newman (CEO)
- Parent: Shine Group (2010–2015); Endemol Shine Group (2015–2020); Banijay Entertainment (2020–2026; 2026–present)
- Website: www.endemolshine.com.au

Endemol Shine Australia is a subsidiary of Banijay Entertainment, a global content production and distribution company. The current CEO of Endemol Shine Australia is Peter Newman.

Endemol Shine Australia is based in Sydney. The company's programming includes various shows on Australian free-to-air networks and pay TV channels, such as MasterChef, Australian Survivor, Big Brother, LEGO Masters, Australian Ninja Warrior, Married at First Sight, Gogglebox Australia, and Ambulance Australia. Endemol Shine Australia also produces dramas such as Offspring, Peter Allen: Not the Boy Next Door, and INXS: Never Tear Us Apart.

Endemol Shine Australia also included the rights to the Hanna-Barbera Pty, Ltd./Taft-Hardie Group Pty. Ltd. library from 2015 to 2020. Following an acquisition of shares, production company Endemol Australia merged with Shine Australia on July 26, 2015.

== History ==
In January 2010, Shine Australia was founded as a part of the Shine Group. It was jointly led by CEOs Mark Fennessy and Carl Fennessy, who had previously worked at FremantleMedia Australia and Crackerjack Productions. Shine Australia is not to be mistaken for the long-serving entertainment and talent company Shine International Entertainment, who own the registered trademark, and have been operating in Australia since 1932.

In February 2016, producer Imogen Banks began to head a new division of Endemol Shine Australia called EndemolShine Banks, which focused on drama productions.

In 2020, Peter Newman became the CEO.

== Productions ==
Program is still in production.

Title	Network	Years	Notes
Junior MasterChef Australia	Network Ten	2010–2011; 2020–present	
The Boss Is Coming to Dinner	Nine Network	2010	
Letters and Numbers	SBS	2010–2012	
The Biggest Loser	Network Ten	2011–2017	Prior seasons produced by FremantleMedia Australia (2006–2010)
Australia's Next Top Model	Fox8	2011–2016	Prior seasons produced by Granada Media Australia (2005–2010)
The Shire	Network Ten	2012	
The Voice Australia	Nine Network	2012–2016	Subsequent seasons are produced by ITV Studios Australia
MasterChef Australia	Network Ten	2012–present	Prior seasons produced by FremantleMedia Australia (2009–2011)
Wife Swap Australia	LifeStyle You	2012	Subsequent seasons produced by Screentime
Location Location Location Australia	Lifestyle Channel; Network Ten	2012–2014, 2023	
MasterChef Australia All Stars	Network Ten	2012	
Beauty and the Geek Australia	Seven Network; Nine Network	2012–2014, 2021–2022	Prior seasons produced by Southern Star Group (2010–2011) and Endemol Southern Star (2009)
SlideShow	Seven Network	2013	
Embarrassing Bodies Down Under	LifeStyle You	2013	
MasterChef Australia: The Professionals	Network Ten	2013	
Aussie Pickers	A&E	2013–2014	
The Bachelor Australia	Network Ten	2013–2015	Subsequent seasons produced by Warner Bros. International Television Production
The Voice: Kids	Nine Network	2014	
So You Think You Can Dance Australia	Network Ten	2014	Prior seasons produced by FremantleMedia Australia (2008–2010)
INXS: Never Tear Us Apart	Seven Network	2014	Telemovie
Living with the Enemy	SBS	2014	
The Face	Fox8	2014	
Catching Milat	Seven Network	2015	Limited series
The Beautiful Lie	ABC	2015	
The Great Australian Spelling Bee	Network Ten; Eleven	2015–2016	
Shark Tank Australia	Network Ten	2015–2018	Subsequent seasons produced by Curio Pictures
Gogglebox Australia	Lifestyle Channel; Network Ten	2015–present	
Offspring	Network Ten	2016–2017	Prior seasons produced by Endemol Australia (2010–2014)
Brock	Network Ten	2016	Limited series
The Big Music Quiz	Seven Network	2016	
Australian Survivor	Network Ten	2016–present	Prior seasons produced by other production companies. In association with Castaway Television Productions
Married at First Sight Australia	Nine Network	2016–present	Previous season produced by Nine Network
Blue Murder: Killer Cop	Seven Network	2017	
Wake in Fright	Network Ten	2017	Co-produced with Lingo Pictures
Sisters	Network Ten	2017	
Look Me in the Eye	SBS	2017	
The Wall	Seven Network	2017	
Family Food Fight	Nine Network	2017–2018	
Australian Ninja Warrior	Nine Network; Network Ten	2017–2022; 2027–present	
Pointless	Network Ten	2018–2019	
Ambulance Australia	Network Ten	2018–present	
Changing Rooms	Network Ten	2019	Prior seasons before the revival, from 1998 to 2005, were produced by other production companies.
One Born Every Minute Australia	Network Ten	2019	
Old People's Home for 4 Year Olds	ABC	2019–present	
Lego Masters	Nine Network	2019–present	
Big Brother	Seven Network; Network Ten	2020–present	Co-production with Seven Studios. Prior seasons before the revival, seasons were produced by Endemol Shine's predecessors Endemol Southern Star (2001–2008) and Endemol Australia (2012–2014)
Ultimate Tag	Seven Network	2021	
RFDS	Seven Network	2021–present	
Hunted Australia	Network Ten	2022–2023	
Echoes	Netflix	2022	co-production with That Kid Ed Productions
Bali 2002	Stan	2022	co-production with Screentime
Love Triangle	Stan	2022–2025	
Would I Lie to You? Australia	Network Ten	2022–2023	
The Traitors	Network Ten	2022–2023	Subsequent seasons produced by South Pacific Pictures
Old People's Home for Teenagers	ABC	2022–2023	
The Hundred with Andy Lee	Nine Network	2022–present	Previous season produced by Screentime. Format based on a concept by Screentime.
Blow Up	Seven Network	2023	
Rush	Nine Network	2023	co-production with Nine Network
The Summit	Nine Network	2023–2024	
Dessert Masters	Network Ten	2023–2024	
NCIS: Sydney	Paramount+ Australia	2023–present	
Gordon Ramsay's Food Stars	Nine Network	2024	co-production with Studio Ramsay Global
Ready Steady Cook	Network Ten	2024	Prior seasons produced by Endemol Southern Star (2005–2009) and Southern Star Group (2009–2013)
Dream Home	Seven Network	2024	
Stranded on Honeymoon Island	Seven Network	2024	
Headliners	ABC	2024	
RBT	Nine Network	2024–present	Prior seasons produced by Screentime
Tipping Point Australia	Nine Network	2024–present	
Deal or No Deal	Network Ten	2024–present	Prior seasons produced by Endemol Southern Star (2003–2009) and Southern Star Group (2009–2013)
Shaun Micallef's Origin Odyssey	SBS	2024–present	
Shaking Down the Thunder	Seven Network	2025	Docu-series
No Holds Barred: The GWS Giants	Seven Network	2025	Docu-series
Portrait Artist of the Year	ABC	2025–present	
My Reno Rules	Seven Network	2026–present	
MAFS: After the Dinner Party	Stan	2026–present	
Race Around the World	ABC	2026–present	Prior seasons produced by ABC TV

== See also ==
- Shine Group
- Shine Limited
- Shine America
