= Chris Brown (veterinarian) =

Australian veterinarian and television presenter (born 1978)

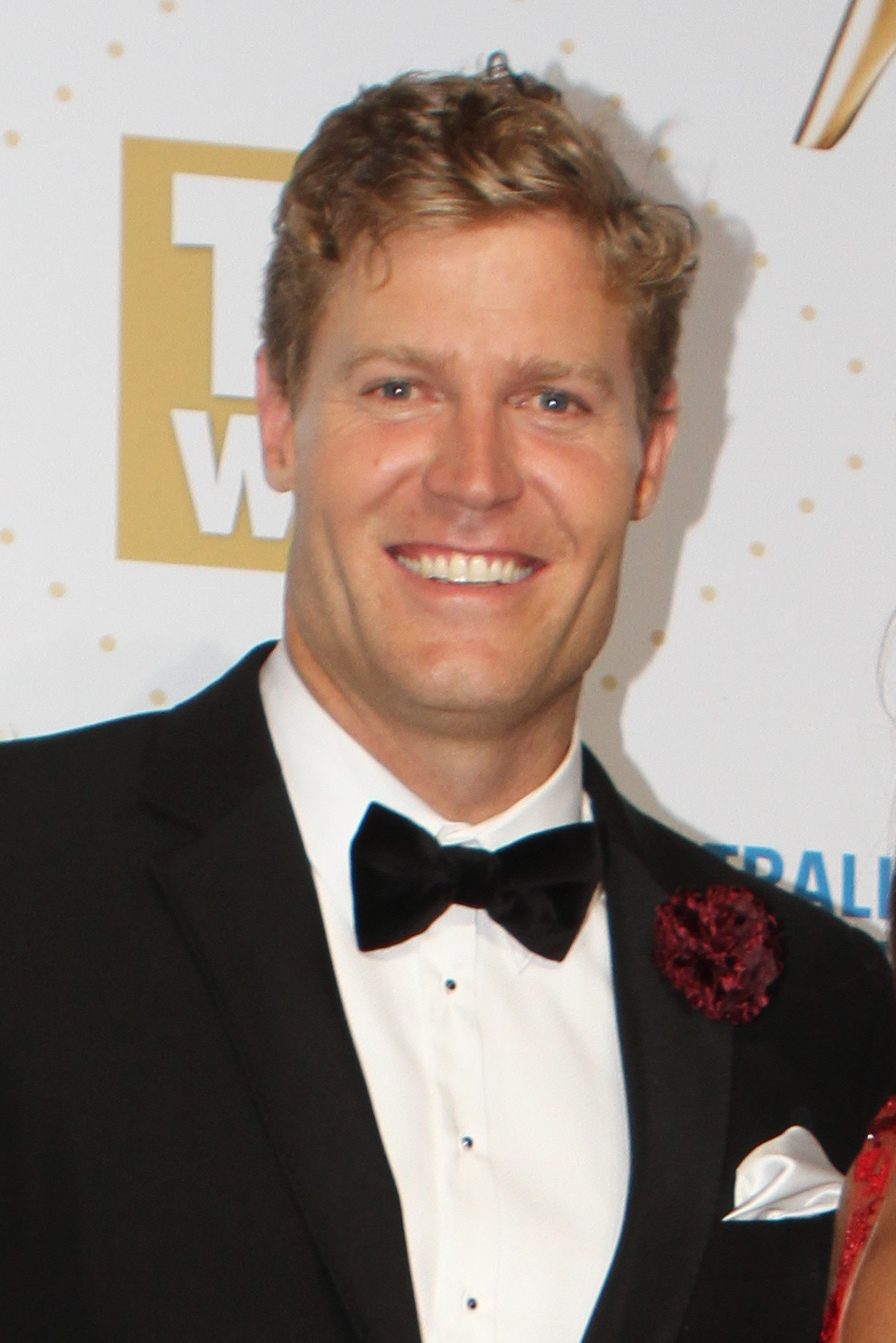
- Brown in 2016
- Born: 11 September 1978 (age 48); Newcastle, New South Wales, Australia
- Education: University of Sydney
- Occupations: Veterinarian, television presenter, author
- Years active: 2003–present
- Employer: Seven Network

Chris Brown (born 11 September 1978) is an Australian veterinarian, television presenter and author. He is best known for the television series Bondi Vet, which began screening in 2009. He hosted The Open Road with Doctor Chris on CBS.

In Australia, he appeared on the lifestyle program The Living Room, and alongside Julia Morris was the presenter of the local version of I'm a Celebrity...Get Me Out of Here!.

== Early life and education ==
Brown was born and grew up in Merewether Heights, Newcastle, New South Wales, where his father was a local vet. He attended Merewether Heights Public School and Merewether High School. His first pet was a cow called Bridget. He graduated from The University of Sydney with First Class Honours in Veterinary Science in 2001.

After graduating from university, Brown began work at a clinic in Sydney's North Shore. He travelled to remote Aboriginal communities in the Northern Territory to treat animals.

== Media career ==
Brown was discovered after a media manager heard him telling stories in a Sydney bar in 2003.

Brown's first television presenting role as a vet was on Harry's Practice in 2003, for which he was nominated for a "Most Popular New Talent" Logie Award. He became a presenter on Channel Nine's Burke's Backyard in 2004 and made regular appearances on Today. His first book, The Family Guide to Pets, was released in 2005 and sold over 25,000 copies.

In 2008, he began writing a column called "Pet Page" in Woman's Day magazine and was interviewed on radio stations Triple M and Vega FM. He also began Bondi Vet on Network Ten, a factual television program that chronicles his life and work at a veterinary clinic at Bondi Junction. Since 28 September 2013, the show is seen on Saturday mornings in the United States on the CBS network, under the title of Dr. Chris: Pet Vet.

In 2010, Brown became a regular guest panelist on Network Ten's talk show The Project, and he served as a fill-in host for Charlie Pickering before Pickering left.

In 2012, Brown began co-hosting Network Ten's lifestyle show The Living Room with Amanda Keller, Miguel Maestre and Barry Du Bois. Brown presents the travel and pet segments on the program.

On 1 February 2015, Brown began co-hosting the Australian version of I'm a Celebrity...Get Me Out of Here! with Julia Morris, also on Network Ten. He and Morris have co-presented all series to date, from 2015 to 2023.

In March 2017, Brown announced he was stepping down as host of Bondi Vet due to an extensive schedule.

Vet Gone Wild, a series that began airing on Animal Planet (US) in June 2018, features Brown helping animals in various situations outside of Sydney. He even ventures out to other countries in some episodes.

In 2018, it was announced that he would host a local version of Saturday Night Takeaway alongside Julia Morris. He began hosting on 24 February 2019 on Network 10, with the name Chris & Julia's Sunday Night Takeaway.

In February 2023, it was announced Brown had signed with Seven Network and would be leaving Network 10 in July 2023 after his final hosting duties of I'm a Celebrity...Get Me Out of Here!.

In June 2023, Seven announced the first two projects Brown will take on, that being host of their upcoming renovation competition, Dream Home, and host and producer of an untitled adventure series.

In October 2023, Daryl Somers announced that he would be stepping back from hosting Seven Network's Dancing with the Stars Australia, and that Brown would be taking over his duties for the show's 21st season set to premiere in 2024. He will co-host alongside Sonia Kruger.

In November 2024, it was announced Brown will host a wildlife series for Seven titled Once In A Lifetime. In October 2025, the series was revealed during Seven's annual upfronts would now air in 2026, with Brown travelling around the world with a celebrity veterinary assistant to treat animals. There was also official confirmation of him hosting a new renovation series, My Reno Rules.

He has also filled in for Larry Emdur on The Morning Show..

In September 2026, Brown was announced as a co-host of KIIS 1065 Sydney's new breakfast radio program, KIIS Breakfast with Chris, Amy & Jack, alongside Amy Gerard and Jack Charles, with the show scheduled to launch on 9 November 2026.

== Personal life ==
Photography has been one of Brown's hobbies since he was a child. He is now an ambassador for Canon. He stated, "Photography has always been a bit of a secret pleasure for me. I'll often grab a camera before or after work to escape for some 'me' time, and you'll find me with one of my eyes wedged up against the viewfinder, trying to capture that elusive shot."

Brown owns the website drool.pet, where he shares pet tips, insights and sells a range of treats, washes and care products.

Brown has worn size 15 shoes since he was 14 years old. In his home town, the only shoes he could buy to fit were purple and green.

Surfing is one of Brown's hobbies, which he could be seen doing on episodes of Bondi Vet. While surfing in Chile on a 12-foot wave, he got whiplash and tore his groin.

== Filmography ==
| Year | Title | Notes |
|---|---|---|
| 2003 | Harry's Practice | Co-host |
| 2004 | Burke's Backyard | Cast member |
| 2008–2016 | Bondi Vet | Host |
| 2012–2022 | The Living Room | Co-host |
| 2015–2023 | I'm A Celebrity...Get Me Out Of Here! | Co-host |
| 2018 | Vet Gone Wild | Host |
| 2019 | Chris & Julia's Sunday Night Takeaway | Co-host |
| 2021–2022 | The Dog House Australia | Narrator |
| 2022 | DC League of Super-Pets | Voice of Mark (Australian release only) |
| 2024 | Dream Home | Host |
| 2024–present | Dancing with the Stars Australia | Co-host |
| 2026 | My Reno Rules | Host |
