= Long Lost Family =

Long Lost Family may refer to:

- Long Lost Family (British TV series) (2011–present), based on the Dutch series Spoorloos
- Long Lost Family (American TV series) (2016–present), also based on Spoorloos
- Long Lost Family (Australian TV series) (2016), also based on Spoorloos
