= Nurses (Australian TV series) =

Nurses is an Australian factual television series that looks at the everyday working of nurses in major city hospitals in Sydney. From the turnstile of medical dramas that come through the doors of St.Vincent's Hospital on a Saturday night, to the race against the clock of an organ delivery for a heart transplant, or an emergency caesarean operation inside North Sydney's Mater Hospital

The series is produced by ITV Studios Australia for the Seven Network in Australia and UKTV in Britain where it is known as Nurses Down Under.

== Episodes ==
No.	Title	Original release date	Aus. viewers
1	"Episode 1"	18 August 2021	604,000
Sydney's bustling nightlife wreaks chaos in the Emergency Department; a young woman undergoes a complicated heart surgery and an ICU patient threatens violence against the medical staff.
2	"Episode 2"	25 August 2021	421,000
Sydney's bustling nightlife wreaks chaos in the Emergency Department; a young woman undergoes a complicated heart surgery and an ICU patient threatens violence against the medical staff.
3	"Episode 3"	1 September 2021	401,000
4	"Episode 4"	8 September 2021	N/A
5	"Episode 5"	15 September 2021	N/A

== See also ==
- Paramedics
- Ambulance Australia
- Emergency Call
