= Emergency Call (Australian TV series) =

Australian television series

- Genre: Factual, Reality, Occupational
- Country of origin: Australia
- Original language: English
- No. of seasons: 1
- No. of episodes: 6

Production
- Production locations: Melbourne, Australia, Brisbane, Australia
- Running time: 30 minutes

Original release
- Network: Seven Network
- Release: 8 October – 13 November 2018

Emergency Call is an Australian factual television series on the Seven Network. It follows emergency telephone workers as they field calls and dispatch emergency responders. This series, unlike Ambulance Australia, is based in Melbourne, Victoria, Australia (police and ambulance) and Brisbane, Queensland, Australia (ambulance only). The series is based on the Belgian French series Emergency Call with local versions of the format also produced by Germany's VOX, the Netherlands EO/NPO1, Italy's RAI2 and C8 in France.

== Episodes ==
No.	Title	Original release date	Viewers
1	"Episode 1"	8 October 2018	512,000
In Brisbane，Ambulance call-taker Julie starts her 12-hour shift at midnight. For all the stab victims and injured patients often with poor outcomes, she got to help a family deliver their second baby, but with a difficult wait to hear his first cry after coming out blue despite being a full-term baby. In Melbourne's ESTA 000 police call centre, a diverted call lead Lauren to an African man who is possibly schizophrenic, and is worried about possibly being recruited by a cult. At the ESTA 000 ambulance call centre., Antoinette has to guide a family to nurse a son that had a suspected overdose and had seizures back to health.
2	"Episode 2"	15 October 2018	579,000
Young call taker Antoinette starts her evening/night shift at Melbourne's ESTA 000's ambulance call centre with a desperate call from a woman whose husband has just collapsed in the front yard after work and is now unconscious. While in the police call centre, Lauren talks to on an informant that is trailing an erratic driver. On another call, follows up on a woman on a prior call about a domestic fight involving her ex-husband trying to get the kids away from her current partner. Kate also starts her shift at the Melbourne police call centre, then takes an eerie call when two passengers were involved in a pre-meditated car crash attack when another car crashed into them from behind for the second time during the police distress call. Later, Antoinette ends her shift on high after delivering an overdue baby boy, the third baby for the family, and the second delivered by Antoinette as a call-taker.
3	"Episode 3"	22 October 2018	N/A
Call-taker Luke starts his shift at ESTA 000's ambulance call centre with a call from a frantic mother, who has tripped and dropped her young baby. Louise talks through a caller where a veteran soccer player collapsed in the middle of the field after a seizure, but having very shallow breaths. He later made a full recovery, but retired from playing. Lauren starts her shift in the police call after a domestic abuse case. Luke takes leave early in his shift after an irate and rude caller complained about the lack of help while his wife suffers a cardiac arrest.
4	"Episode 4"	29 October 2018	N/A
Joel begins his night shift at ESTA 000's police call centre with a call from a concerned woman after witnessing two teenage women being assaulted by 8 men. In the ambulance centre, Antoinette responds to a man, whose wife is suffering from a severe asthma attack. She was deceased en route to hospital. Tori starts her shift in Brisbane's ambulance dispatch centre with a caller that discovered a body of his deceased neighbour. Back in Melbourne, Luke takes caller from a distressed mother, whose daughter has a history of endangering herself by walking towards oncoming traffic. Louise takes a break from her shift with a call from a man whose wife suffers from a seizure partly due to an ovarian cyst.
5	"Episode 5"	6 November 2018	N/A
Following on from last episode, Louise returns to continue her shift, and receives a call from a neighbour's of a samurai sword stabbing victim. In the morning, Antoinette takes a call from a mother whose infant daughter was having febrile convulsion after a high fever, and she recovered in time after losing her breathing for 2 minutes. In ESTA 000's police call centre, Joel and Lauren takes three related calls about a primary school brawl involving teenagers, and causing nuisance in the nearby neighbourhood.
6	"Episode 6"	13 November 2018	N/A
Sharon starts her shift in ESTA 000 police centre, and receives a call from a concerned young woman, who later revealed to be a second-year paramedics student, over the planned disappearance of her mother due to marriage issues. While in Brisbane, Louise receives a call from a woman where her mother and sister suffered burns from a butane explosion, where the fire is already extinguished. In ESTA 000 police centre, Kate starts her shift and deals with an elderly woman with an unexpected young woman who turns up in her house, before answering a follow-up call where a man is being assaulted by a gang of thugs in an area where a local police station is far away. In Brisbane, Julie takes the final call of her shift from a concerned man, where someone is lying in the middle of the road, seemingly having been hit by a car, but as the caller has no credit (not knowing calls to emergency services are free), he gave the wrong number for the return call, the directions were good enough to ascertain that the patient is unconscious.

== See also ==
- Paramedics
- Ambulance Australia
- Ambulance
