= Ask the Doctor (TV series) =

Australian factual television series

- Starring: Dr Sandro Demaio; Dr Renee Lim; Dr Shalin Naik; Dr Caroline West
- Country of origin: Australia
- Original language: English
- No. of seasons: 2
- No. of episodes: 24

Production
- Executive producer: Ariel White
- Producer: Ged Wood
- Running time: 30 minutes
- Production companies: WTFN Entertainment; Australian Broadcasting Corporation; Film Victoria

Original release
- Network: ABC
- Release: 16 May 2017 – 30 July 2019

Ask the Doctor is an Australian factual television series produced by WTFN Entertainment. The series explores healthcare, the latest in medical treatments and answer viewers questions to help them live healthier lives. The first series cast comprised Dr. Shalin Naik, Dr. Renee Lim and Dr. Sandro Demaio. The second series replaced Dr Lim with Dr Caroline West. In each episode they tackle a different healthcare issue such as obesity, sleep deprivation, exercise and digestive health.

The series first broadcast on ABC on 16 May 2017 in the Tuesday 8:00 pm time slot, where it remained for the rest of the series. The first season consists of 12 episodes.

The second series of 12 episodes was aired on ABC in two parts; the first 6 episodes weekly from 2 October 2018 and the remaining 6 beginning 25 Jun 2019

The first series received mixed reviews.
