= Long Lost Family (British TV series) =

- Genre: Documentary
- Based on: Spoorloos by KRO-NCRV
- Presented by: Davina McCall; Nicky Campbell
- Country of origin: United Kingdom
- Original language: English
- No. of series: 15 (Regular); 8 (What Happened Next); 6 (Born Without Trace); 1 (Switched at Birth); 1 (Shipped to Australia)
- No. of episodes: 91 (Regular); 25 (What Happened Next); 15 (Born Without Trace); 1 (Switched at Birth); 1 (Shipped to Australia)

Production
- Producers: Juliet Singer; Thea Hickson
- Running time: 60 minutes (inc. adverts)
- Production company: Wall to Wall

Original release
- Network: ITV
- Release: 21 April 2011 – present

Long Lost Family is a British television series that has aired on ITV since 21 April 2011. The programme, which is presented by Davina McCall and Nicky Campbell, aims to reunite close relatives after years of separation. It is made by the production company Wall to Wall. Two other series have been produced as well, What Happened Next, a show revisiting some previous guests with updates, and Born Without Trace, a show aiming to help foundlings locate any of their biological family. A number of special episodes have been released as well. Long Lost Family is based on the Dutch series Spoorloos (English: Without a Trace), airing on NPO 1 from 1990 and made by KRO-NCRV.

== Background ==
The series is based on the long running Dutch TV programme Spoorloos, which aired from 2 February 1990 to 11 December 2024 before being cancelled in February 2025 due to several reunion mismatches. Early Spoorloos shows included studio interviews with people who knew a missing person and ended with the missing person joining them in the studio. Later shows focused more on biological family reunions outside the studio with DNA matching done behind the scenes.

The show led to several international versions:

- A Danish version called Sporløs, has aired 19 series since 1999.
- A Finnish version called Kadonneen jäljillä has been airing since 2009.
- A Norwegian version called Sporløs has been airing on TV 2 since 2010.
- The British version, called Long Lost Family, airing since April 2011.
- A Hungarian version aired on RTL, called Keresem a családom, was aired from 2015 to 2020.
- An Australian version (also Long Lost Family), hosted by Chrissie Swan and Anh Do, was screened for a single series on the Ten Network in 2016.
- A US version (also Long Lost Family), presented by Chris Jacobs and Lisa Joyner and sponsored by TLC and Ancestry.com, aired 6 series between 2016 and 2019.

== Format ==
The British version of the show is presented by Davina McCall and Nicky Campbell, and often offers a last chance for people who may be desperate to find or learn more about long lost relatives. Given the large numbers contacting the show, the series only helps a selection of people, most of whom eventually appear and participate on screen. With the help of the hosts, each guest is then guided and supported through the process of tracing the member of their family they have been seeking, in some cases for more than 50 or 60 years.

Using the show's resources, the programme is often able to devote considerable time to track down archival materials and scour public records. They also use intermediaries, referred to in the show as "trained intermediaries", who are (as per the Adoption and Children Act 2002) able to access adoption files, uncover birth or death record details, reveal new legal names for adopted children, and initiate first contact on behalf of the show.

The show also explores the background and context of each family's estrangement and tracks the often complex and emotional process of finding each lost relative before they are reunited. They reveal background details to each case (as agreed to by the guests) and elements of the social context. They also uncover reasons why these estrangements occurred, from the young single mothers who willingly or unwillingly surrendered their babies, to parents who abandoned their children, and to underlying familial, financial, and institutional pressures that led to forced fostering or adoptions.

Sometimes, for privacy reasons, the entire backstory is not provided in detail, nor a person’s current familial situation explained clearly. Further, not all reunions are positive either, with aged relatives sometimes deceased, or others not willing to appear on camera, and some who do not wish to face decades old family secrets. In the UK and other versions, the family are usually told distressing news away from the cameras out of respect.

== Transmissions ==
=== Regular series ===
Series	Episodes	Originally aired	
Series	Episodes	First aired	Last aired
1	6	21 April 2011	26 May 2011
2	7	12 April 2012	31 May 2012
3	8	17 June 2013	12 August 2013
4	8	14 July 2014	1 September 2014
5	6	3 June 2015	8 July 2015
6	7	13 July 2016	24 August 2016
7	7	26 July 2017	6 September 2017
8	7	17 July 2018	28 August 2018
9	7	10 June 2019	19 August 2019
The Unknown Soldiers	1	21 October 2019	
10	5	18 January 2021	15 February 2021
11	9	5 July 2021	31 August 2021
12	7	13 June 2022	25 July 2022
13	7	3 July 2023	14 August 2023
14	6	8 July 2024	25 August 2024
15	7	18 September 2025	29 January 2026

=== What Happened Next ===
A revisited series called Long Lost Family: What Happened Next has aired on ITV since 2014.

Series	Episodes	Originally aired	
Series	Episodes	First aired	Last aired
1	3	9 September 2014	14 October 2014
2	3	9 May 2017	23 May 2017
3	3	11 June 2018	2 July 2018
Christmas Reunion	1	17 December 2018	
4	3	29 July 2019	12 August 2019
Twin Special	1	28 October 2019	
5	3	6 July 2020	20 July 2020
6	2	15 April 2021	27 May 2021
7	3	8 August 2022	22 August 2022
8	3	4 April 2023	20 April 2023

=== Born Without Trace ===
Series	Episodes	Originally aired	
Series	Episodes	First aired	Last aired
Special	1	25 February 2019	
1	2	1 June 2020	2 June 2020
2	3	24 May 2021	26 May 2021
3	3	23 May 2022	25 May 2022
4	3	26 June 2023	28 June 2023
5	3	10 June 2024	12 June 2024
6	3	18 June 2025	2 July 2025

== Awards and nominations ==
Year	Group	Award	Result
2013	RTS Television Award	"Popular Factual and Features"	Won
2014	BAFTA Awards	"Features Programme"	Won
2014	RTS Television Award	"Popular Factual and Features"	Nominated
2014	RTS Television Award	"Presenter" (Davina McCall)	Nominated
2015	National Television Awards	"Most Popular Factual Entertainment Programme"	Nominated
2021	BAFTA Awards	"Features Programme" (Born Without Trace)	Won
2021	RTS Television Award	"Formatted Popular Factual"	Nominated
2026	Sandford St Martin Award	"Radio Times Readers’ Award"	Won

== Reception ==
Michael Deacon of The Daily Telegraph gave the show a mixed review, stating "the presenters seemed to be trying slightly too hard to squeeze tears out of their interviewees". Deacon also commented, "I wonder what the producers would do if the two people they brought together, instead of embracing joyfully, launched into a furious rally of accusations and blame. Perhaps I'll tune in next week to see whether it happens, although that will depend on whether I can stomach more of Pavlov’s Piano, or for that matter Davina McCall's habit of talking to her interviewees, even the elderly ones, as if she were their proud mother, waving them off at the school gate".

Lucy Mangan of The Guardian gave a more positive review, commenting "Within its own parameters, it succeeds quite nicely. Davina's common touch remains infallible and her co-host Nicky Campbell's almost pathological lack of charisma is obscured and alleviated by his status as an adopted son himself, [which] makes the whole thing slightly less painful than it might have been". Mangan summed up the show as a "lovely documentary".

Alice-Azania Jarvis of The Independent gave a show a mixed to positive review, saying: "It was all very warm and fuzzy and just what you'd expect, apart from the presenters, who struck me as an odd duo. His connection is obvious – adopted at four days old – hers rather less so. Still, she's really rather good: none of the overgrown-yoof presenting she favours on Big Brother, much more concerned (grown-up) friend. I can't imagine this continuing for more than a couple of series – it's all a little one-trick: once you've got the hang of the tracking-down-strangers part, there's only so much to be astonished about. But, for the meantime, it ain't bad".

Sam Wollaston of The Guardian praised Long Lost Family, calling it "very good" and "so much more interesting than Who Do You Think You Are?". He added, "It's so moving because it's real, and it's about separation and hurt, guilt and regret, growing up, identity, belonging, family, love, life. Now I'm blubbing, like a baby."

The Long Lost Family Special – The Mother And Baby Home Scandal won the "Radio Times Readers’ Award" at the 2026 Sandford St Martin Awards, which recognize excellence in broadcasting on religion, ethics, and spirituality.
