= St John Western Australia =

Non-profit, charitable organisation

St John WA
- St John WA Logo
- Abbreviation: SJWA
- Formation: 1891
- Type: Charitable organisation Limited company
- Headquarters: Belmont, Western Australia, 6104
- Location: Western Australia
- CEO: Kevin Brown
- Key people: Sally Carbon (Chair & Commandery Lieutenant)
- Parent organisation: St John Ambulance Australia
- Subsidiaries: St John Medical Services
- Affiliations: Order of St John; St John International
- Staff: 1,518 (2017)
- Volunteers: 9,140 (2017)
- Website

St John Ambulance Western Australia (St John WA) is a non-profit, charitable organisation providing first aid services and training, urgent care, patient transport, ambulance and other medical services in Western Australia. It has provided the ambulance service in Western Australia since 1922. These services are provided through a combination of paid and volunteer staff. St John WA is funded through a combination of government funding, Lotterywest grants, corporate and private donations and user pays services.

Western Australia and the Northern Territory are the only two states or territories in Australia which do not have ambulance services provided by government agencies. Neither are these services in those two regulated by legislation.

== History ==
St John Ambulance Western Australia (St John WA) is part of the international Order of St John, a humanitarian organisation that traces its roots back to the Knights Hospitaller who provided care to the sick and injured during the Crusades.

In Western Australia, St John has been part of the community since 1891. Founded by Dr George McWilliams and Mathieson Jacoby, the organisation initially focused on providing first aid training to the public.

In 1922, St John WA expanded its services by forming the St John Ambulance Brigade, dedicated to offering on-site first aid and patient transport to hospitals. This initiative marked the beginning of the organisation’s role as Western Australia’s primary ambulance service provider, a responsibility it continues to uphold.

Throughout its history, St John WA has grown significantly, now operating a comprehensive fleet of ambulance vehicles and other support units. The organisation relies on a combination of paid staff and volunteers to deliver a wide range of services, including first aid training, urgent care, patient transport, event health services, and emergency medical services.

St John WA is the world’s largest single ambulance service by geographic coverage. It operates across 2.5 million square kilometres across Western Australia, as well as Christmas Island.

In April 2025, St John WA began collaborating with the production team of the Australian factual television series “Paramedics” to film its sixth season in Western Australia. The show aims to showcase the daily experiences and challenges faced by paramedics in the region, and is the first of its kind in Western Australia, previously seasons having been filmed in South Australia and Victoria. The series is scheduled to air on Channel 9 in mid-2026.

== Vehicles ==
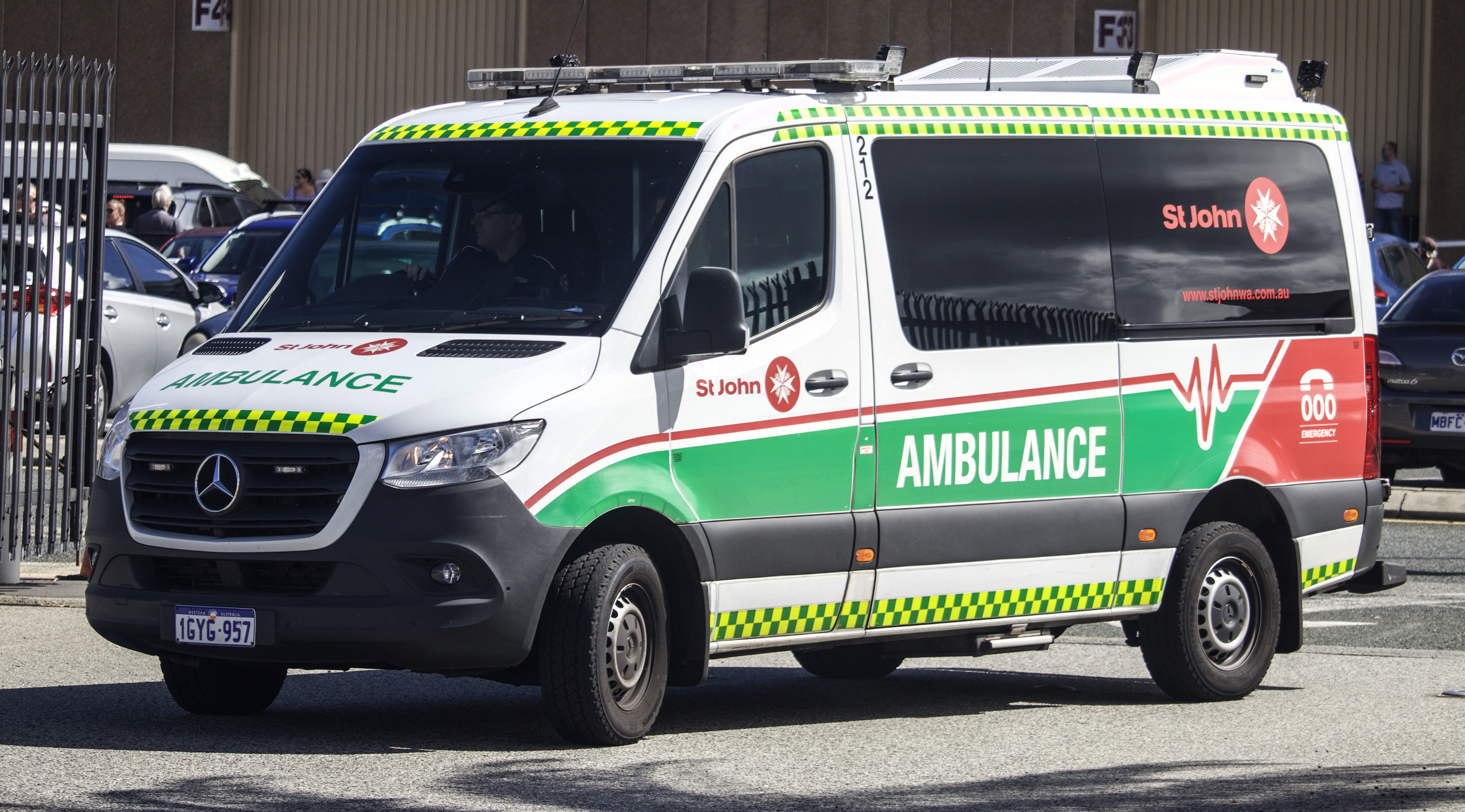
Mercedes-Benz Sprinter ambulance

As of 2017, St John WA has a fleet of 531 ambulance vehicles and 217 other vehicles:

- Ambulance – Mercedes Benz Sprinter (various specifications, including 4 × 4), Toyota Land Cruiser Troop Carrier (regional only), Ford F 150/250 (past use).
- Paramedic/Command – Subaru Forester, Holden Colorado 7/Trailblazer, Toyota Land Cruiser 100/200, Ford Ranger (regional), Ford Falcon (still some regional use, older models).
- Event Health Services – Mercedes Benz Sprinter (first aid post/event management), Volkswagen Caddy, Hyundai Staria, Subaru Forester, Kia Sportage and Isuzu Truck.
- Support and Transfer – Mercedes Benz Sprinter (logistics and transfer), Toyota HiAce (wheelchair patients), MAN truck (multiple patient vehicle), Isuzu N Series (incident support vehicles and command post).
- Helicopters – Operated by DFES, the RAC Rescue Helicopter service consists of three AW139’s, each out of Perth and Bunbury, and one as a backup. It is crewed by St John Critical Care paramedics and provides search and rescue operations and critical medical transport across Western Australia.

== Uniform ==
Previous uniforms were the traditional white shirts with khaki tunics and pants with black epaulettes. The high collar tunic was replaced with a soft collar and black tie. A khaki peaked cap, which in later years became a white topped peaked cap, were replaced during the 1970s with blue trousers and a white smock for summer uniform, along with a white skivvy and blue jacket for winter. In 1981 the uniforms changed to blue trousers, blue shirt and a blue jacket with tie for winter. In 1983 a padded winter jacket with reflective stripes replaced the blue jacket. Ties were discontinued at that time as they were impractical in the field. In 1995 a light green shirt, teamed with dark green pants and jacket was introduced. In the late 2000s the uniforms were upgraded to the new style of all over, utility suit. These consist of a black undershirt with dark green shirt, jacket and pants with reflective stripes. Rescue helmets are utilised in certain situations along with high visibility vests with officer rank visible.

== Services and Roles ==
Metropolitan Ambulance Service

The Metropolitan Ambulance Service provides emergency medical response across Perth and surrounding urban areas. Crewed by Paramedics and Ambulance Officers, this service responds to Triple Zero (000) calls, delivering pre hospital care and rapid transport to hospitals. It is also supported by Critical Care Paramedics and clinicians who operate as single responders in specially equipped vehicles, providing life support and clinical leadership at complex or high-acuity incidents.

Country Ambulance Service

Covering the largest area in the world for a single ambulance service, the Country Ambulance Service delivers critical pre-hospital care to regional and remote communities across Western Australia. It relies on a combination of Volunteer Ambulance Officers, Community Paramedics, and paid Paramedics to respond to emergencies and transport patients across vast distances.

Event Health Service

Event Health Services provides first aid and emergency medical support at public events, concerts, and festivals. Staffed by mostly volunteer Ambulance Officers, Student Medics, Nurses, Qualified Paramedics and even Doctors, this service ensures the safety of crowds through on-site medical care and rapid response capabilities.

Industry Medical Service

The Industry Medical Service delivers tailored medical support to high-risk and remote worksites, such as mining and construction sites. Roles within this service include on-site Paramedics, Medics, and Health and Safety Advisors trained to manage workplace incidents and occupational health needs. This service provides primary pre-hospital health care coverage for Perth Airport.

Patient Transport Service

St John's Patient Transport Service offers non-emergency transport for patients requiring medical oversight during transfers between hospitals, aged care facilities, or home. Staffed by a combination of paid and volunteer Transport Officers, the service ensures safe and comfortable journeys for patients who do not require urgent care.

Primary Health Care/Urgent Care

St John WA operates a network of Urgent Care Centres that provide walk-in medical treatment for non-life-threatening conditions such as minor injuries and illnesses. These centres are staffed by doctors, nurses, and allied health professionals, helping to reduce pressure on hospital emergency departments by offering accessible, high-quality care. In addition to urgent care, some locations also offer General Practice (GP) services and dental care, providing comprehensive, community-based healthcare under one roof.

State Control Centre

The State Control Centre (SCC) is the hub of emergency communications, where call takers and dispatchers manage incoming Triple Zero (000) ambulance calls and coordinate emergency responses across the state. This team ensures timely and efficient dispatch of resources, supporting both metro and country services 24/7.

== Incidents ==
In July 2009, the ABC's Four Corners broadcast a report identifying failures in St John's call-out system, specifically the failure of call centre operators to appropriately prioritise and respond ambulances. The program identified four deaths in which dispatch and prioritisation errors were involved. The WA Health Minister, Dr Kim Hames, has since promised to review "reports of significant wrongdoing, and see if it is correct" in order to prevent recurrence of such events.

On 24 March 2015, the ABC's 7.30 reported on poor management and culture within St John in Western Australia which led an ambulance officer to commit suicide.

== St John First Responder app ==
The St John First Responder app was designed for use in Western Australia and allows users to send their GPS coordinates to emergency service call centres when dialing 000. The app also provides an in-built first aid guide, automated external defibrillator locator, first aid tips and more. Over 200,000 Western Australians have downloaded the app. Registered first responders must have current cardiopulmonary resuscitation certification and completed a first aid course within the last three years to be approved on the platform.
