= Rhonda Galbally =

Australian disability advocate

Rhonda Galbally AC
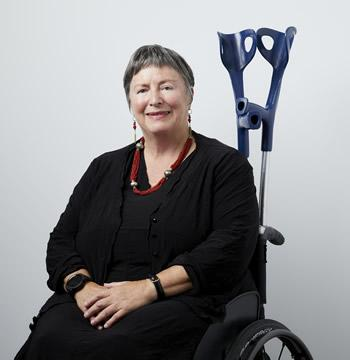
- Born: 1948 (age 77–78)
- Occupations: Health, social services and disability rights advocate
- Board member of: National Disability Insurance Agency (2013–present)
- Children: Megan Galbally
- Family: Eva Lewis - Granddaughter Amber Lewis - Granddaughter

Rhonda Galbally AC has been a CEO, chair and board member for over thirty years, across business and the not for profit sector, the public sector and philanthropy.

As a woman with a lifelong disability, Galbally first began focusing on disability rights and policy in the early 1980s while working as the senior policy officer for the Victorian Council for Social Services. Galbally next became the CEO of the Sidney Myer Fund and the Myer Foundation, in that role she served as chair of the Australian Association of Philanthropy.

Galbally was appointed as the founding CEO of a number of new organisations, including the Australian Commission for the Future, the Australian International Health Institute, the Australian National Preventative Health Agency and OurCommunity Pty Ltd. Galbally established the Victorian Health Promotion Foundation (VicHealth) as the first organisation in the world to use a levy on tobacco for tobacco control, reducing demand for alcohol, tackling risk factors for heart disease, cancer and diabetes, injury prevention, sexual health and mental health promotion. Galbally was appointed as the independent chair of the Review of Drugs Poisons and Controlled Substances Legislation (the Galbally Review).

Galbally chaired the Royal Women's Hospital. She was a member of the expert four-person panel that developed the Victorian Charter of Human Rights and Responsibilities. Galbally then went on to chair the Federal Government's National People with Disability and Carers' Council.

Galbally was a board member of the National Disability Insurance Agency (NDIA) and Principal Member of the Independent Advisory Council which provided advice to the NDIA about the importance of self-determination, social and economic inclusion, peer support and contemporary living models including the right to a mainstream life for people with disabilities.

With a career spanning many decades and positions at the highest levels, Galbally considers that a highlight was developing the National Disability and Carer Alliance that brought together people with disabilities, families and carers with services to campaign for the National Disability insurance Scheme by developing the Every Australian Counts Campaign.

Galbally is a current Commissioner of the Royal Commission into Violence, Abuse, Neglect and Exploitation of People with Disabilities.

== Honours and awards ==
In 1991 Galbally was appointed an Officer (AO) of the Order of Australia. She was inducted onto the Victorian Honour Roll of Women in 2005. She has received honorary doctorates from RMIT University in and La Trobe University, and was awarded the Centenary Medal in 2001. In 2019 Galbally was promoted to Companion (AC) of the Order of Australia.

== Published works ==
- Just Passions. Melbourne: Pluto Press. 2004. ISBN 1-86403-296-0.
