= Sydney Harbour Patrol =

- Genre: Documentary
- Created by: WTFN
- Country of origin: Australia
- Original language: English
- No. of series: 1
- No. of episodes: 2

Production
- Running time: 60 min

Original release
- Network: Discovery Channel
- Release: 30 October 2016 – present

Sydney Harbour Patrol is an Australian factual television show that follows marine police, salvage teams, ship yards and environmental protection units in Sydney, Australia. The series is produced by WTFN and screened on the Foxtel Discovery Channel.
