= WTFN =

Australian television production company

WTFN Entertainment Pty Ltd
- Industry: Production company
- Founded: 2001; 25 years ago
- Headquarters: Melbourne, Australia
- Key people: Daryl Talbot (CEO); Steve Oemcke (Chief Creative Officer)
- Website: wtfn.com

WTFN is an Australian production company based in Melbourne. The company produces numerous observational documentary, lifestyle and reality series across many television networks.

== History ==
WTFN was founded by Daryl Talbot and Steve Oemcke in 2001. Talbot, a former journalist for the Bendigo Advertiser, had worked in television for a number of years and produced Postcards for Nine, and Oemcke began at a Channel 8 newsroom in central Victoria, and found fame as a host of the Seven Network’s long-running game show Wheel Of Fortune.

The company's first production was observational series Bread, which broadcast in 2003 on Network Ten, and followed people starting a small business. WTFN quickly gained prominence producing titles that included Coxy's Big Break, Bondi Vet, and The Living Room. Bondi Vet has gone on to be sold in over 100 countries.

In 2012, the company launched international distribution company Fred Media, which represents both WTFN's programs and those from other production houses. The company has signed a number of international content output deals, including a 2011 deal with US based Discovery Communications, a 2012 deal with South African Okhule Media, and a 2014 deal with Chinese broadcaster Tianjin TV. It opened a Los Angeles based office in 2012.

The company received attention in 2012 after the broadcast of McDonalds's Gets Grilled on Seven. The documentary was the recipient of allegations of bias due to it being funded by McDonald's, but WTFN and Seven defended the program, saying that the producers maintained full editorial control over the content.

In 2013, WTFN made a move into producing drama content after acquiring production company The Film Company and appointing its head, Richard Keddie, as WTFN's Director of Drama and Features. WTFN had its first foray into feature films in 2016 with the release of Oddball starring Shane Jacobson, and children's television drama series Larry the Wonderpup in 2018.

WTFN began a succession of Victorian based observational documentary series for Nine Network in 2018 with Paramedics, followed by Emergency which films at The Royal Melbourne Hospital, and Mega Zoo shot across Melbourne Zoo, Werribee Open Range Zoo, and Healesville Sanctuary. Other series the company has gone on to produce include MTV American franchise Teen Mom spin-off Teen Mom Australia, Sydney Harbour Force for Discovery, Code 1: Minute by Minute and Police Strike Force for Seven, and decluttering/renovation series Space Invaders for Nine.

WTFN has expanded its distribution capabilities into digital distribution eco-system RADAR MCN, pioneering the concept of "Total Distribution". Radar brings together content production, channel management, content licensing and digital rights protection. The channel network attracts hundreds of millions of viewers across numerous AVOD channels including Youtube, Facebook, Snap, TikTok, Instagram and a range of FAST channels. Radar has been granted Youtube’s CMS affiliation status, which allows Radar to manage third party channels and content rights.

The name WTFN derives from a conversation Talbot and Oemcke had when starting the business. When discussing how to raise funding for their first pilot, one of the pair suggested putting in the money themselves and the other responded with "why the fuck not?", a phrase which was condensed into WTFN.

== Productions ==
=== Television ===
- A Pub Too Far
- Ask the Doctor
- Australia Plays Broadway
- Beyond the Boundary
- Bollywood Star
- Bondi Vet
- Bread
- Code 1: Minute by Minute
- Coxy's Big Break
- Danger! Wild Animals
- Discover Downunder
- Don't Come Monday
- Dr. Lisa to the Rescue
- Dream Job
- Emergency
- First On Scene
- G'day Cirque du Soleil
- Go For Your Life
- Great Innovators: The Rise of Australian Wine
- Guide to the Good Life
- Holidays For Sale
- Jade's Quest: To the Ends of the Earth
- Just Go
- Keeping Up with the Joneses
- Larry the Wonderpup
- Lee Chan's World Food Tour
- Long Lost Family
- Lost & Found
- McDonald's Gets Grilled
- Meet the Menagerie
- Megafactories
- Mega Zoo
- Melbourne Woman
- Mercurio's Menu
- Miguel's Feasts
- Oddball: The Nature of a Movie
- On Display
- On Thin Ice – Jade's Polar Dream
- Operation Thailand
- Our Wild Weather
- Paramedics
- Police Strike Force
- Real Rangers
- Shopping for Love
- Space Invaders
- Sudden Impact
- Supercar Showdown
- Sydney Harbour Force
- Sydney Harbour Patrol
- Talk to the Animals
- Tattoo Tales
- Teen Mom Australia
- Test Drive
- The Great Water Challenge
- The Great Weekend
- The Living Room
- The Making Of…
- The People Speak
- The Renovation King
- The Ultimate Rider
- The Wild Life of Tim Faulkner
- Tony Robinson Down Under (a.k.a. Tony Robinson Explores Australia)
- Tony Robinson's London Games Unearthed
- Tony Robinson's Time Travels
- Tony Robinson's Time Walks
- Tony Robinson's Tour of Duty
- Travels with the Bondi Vet
- Trishna & Krishna: The Quest for Separate Lives
- Vet on the Hill
- We're Talking Animals
- West Gate Bridge Disaster: The Untold Stories
- Wilde About Golf
- Your Domain
- Your Very First Puppy

=== Film ===
- Oddball
