= Rob Moodie (doctor) =

Rob Moodie (born 1953, c. Melbourne) is Professor of Public Health at the Melbourne School of Population and Global Health at the University of Melbourne. Prior to this he was Professor of Global Health at the Nossal Institute of Global Health. He was named Victorian Father of the Year in 2005. He is married and has two children.

He graduated in medicine at the University of Melbourne in 1976, and has also studied Tropical Medicine at Paris University and Public Health at Harvard University. He has worked for the Save the Children Fund, Médecins Sans Frontières, the Burnet Institute, the World Health Organization and UNAIDS. He was CEO of the Victorian Health Promotion Foundation (VicHealth) from 1998 to 2007.

He was chair of the Melbourne Storm rugby league club from 2006 to 2010, and wrote a regular column in Cosmos magazine on medical oddities.
