= Victorian Health Promotion Foundation =

Coordinates: 37.803287°S 144.968634°E

VicHealth
- Victorian Health Promotion Foundation

Agency overview
- Formed: 1987
- Type: foundation
- Employees: 85 (Includes part-time and full time. Updated August 2022)
- Annual budget: A$43.053 million (FY 2022–23
- Minister responsible: The Hon. Mary-Anne Thomas, MP, Minister for Health and Minister for Ambulance Services
- Agency executives: The Hon. Nicola Roxon, Chair; Dr Sandro Demaio, CEO
- Parent department: Department of Health
- Key document: Tobacco Act 1987
- Website: vichealth.vic.gov.au

The Victorian Health Promotion Foundation is a statutory authority in the Australian state of Victoria, originally funded by hypothecated taxation raised by the Victorian Tobacco Act 1987. It was the first health promotion body in the world to be funded by a tax on tobacco.

Better known as VicHealth, the organisation has a mandate to promote good health for all Victorians. With a focus on promoting good health and preventing chronic disease, it leads and advocates for excellence in health-promoting policies and programs for:

- Active communities and sport
- Social connection and mental wellbeing
- Healthy and sustainable food systems
- Reducing harm from alcohol and tobacco products

== History ==
=== Founding and early history (1987–1997) ===
In 1987, the Victorian Health Promotion Foundation (VicHealth) was established with funding from government-collected tobacco taxes and mandated to promote health in the State of Victoria.

In 1988, VicHealth moved to buy out tobacco company sponsorship of sport and the arts. As a result, Quit, Heart Health and other health promotion programs replaced tobacco sponsorships. The Anti-Cancer Council of Victoria (now the Cancer Council Victoria) received funding from VicHealth to run its SunSmart and Quit programs, and VicHealth funded the first Victorian breast cancer screening program.

In 1989, VicHealth funded significant research into Alzheimer's disease at the Mental Health Research Institute.

In 1994, VicHealth held its first national conference to examine the pioneering developments of working with sport and art organisations to promote health. VicHealth also funded the research arm of the Early Psychosis Prevention and Intervention Centre, a program aimed to increase the capacity to intervene and prevent youth suicide.

In 1995, VicHealth launched Healthy Families of the Future, a program to improve mental health and wellbeing within families.

In 1996, VicHealth was recognised with the World Health Organization Medal for Excellence and the Active for Life program launched in schools to teach children about making exercise a healthy lifetime habit to prevent heart disease.

=== 1998–2007 ===
In 1998–1999, VicHealth launched the Koori Health Research and Community Development Unit and the Mental Health Promotion Plan for Victoria; focusing on social connection, freedom from discrimination and economic participation as major factors impacting on mental health.

In 2000, The VicHealth Centre for Tobacco Control opened, focusing on legal, economic and social research to strengthen tobacco control initiatives.

In 2001, smokefree dining in Victoria was introduced and the Together We Do Better campaign was launched.

In 2002–2003, VicHealth launched Leading the Way, a project dedicated to promoting healthy eating and active living in local communities.

In 2006, VicHealth ran a 10,000 Steps Walking Challenge during the Melbourne 2006 Commonwealth Games, the largest of its kind to take place in Victoria. More than 1600 clubs participated in the Australian Drug Foundation's Good Sports program, an initiative supported by VicHealth designed to change the booze culture that exists in many sporting clubs. VicHealth established a partnership with the AFL to advance violence prevention activity through sport.

In 2007, VicHealth supported a State Government ban on the sale of alcopop tubes and created the Victorian Health Inequalities Network to encourage public dialogue about the development of coherent strategies to reduce inequalities.

=== 2008–2013 ===
In 2008, VicHealth hosted the 2008 World Conference on the Promotion of Mental Health in Melbourne, and the Streets Ahead program was started. The organisation began funding thirty State Sporting Associations to increase club-level involvement in sports, and its Motion program sought to increase community arts participation. In 2012, VicHealth began a workplace health program to address issues ranging from individual stress to the effects of prolonged sitting.

The "Seed Challenge" campaign of 2013 sought to increase Victorians' consumption of healthy foods.

=== 2014–2022 ===
VicHealth was named a World Health Organization Collaborating Centre for Leadership in Health Promotion in September 2014. In the same year, the organisation formed a panel of experts, "Leading Thinkers", to examine various health challenges from a range of theoretical perspectives. A second round of arts funding began in 2015, as did the VicHealth Citizens' Jury on Obesity, a collection of online and in-person focus groups looking at simplifying healthy eating.

In 2018, "This Girl Can - Victoria" was launched to increase women's physical activity and health. In 2021, the "Future Healthy" campaign was started to provide funding for a range of community organisations.

=== 2023–current ===
In 2023, VicHealth launched VicHealth Strategy 2023, a document outlining the Victorian Health Department's plan for improving public health in the state of Victoria, Australia.

In March 2023, VicHealth invested $3.5 million in JumpStart! initiative, which is focused on creating communities that support the health of young people. Two JumpStart! ideas in the Shepparton region have already been revealed, with both ASHEfest and Valley Sport receiving $40,000 in funding.

At the same year, VicHealth launched a large-scale campaign against vaping, in particular unveiling a sculpture on the harms of vaping, promoting a draft law on regulating the use of electronic cigarettes among young people.

Also, VicHealth and Monash University released the Kids Building Future Healthy program, where students were given the mission to design and build communities where people are connected, active, and eating well, using the game Minecraft Education Edition.

In 2023, VicHealth launched RealityCheck mental health platform that provides resources and tools for individuals to manage their mental well-being. The platform offers a range of features, including mood tracking, journaling, and meditation exercises. RealityCheck also provides personalized recommendations based on user input and offers support from mental health professionals.

== Strategic imperatives ==
VicHealth's Action Agenda for Health Promotion 2013–2023 focuses on the following five strategic imperatives:

- promoting healthy eating
- encouraging regular physical activity
- preventing tobacco use
- preventing harm from alcohol
- improving mental wellbeing

These priorities are consistent with VicHealth's obligations under the Tobacco Act of 1987. They also align with State Government policy and program directions, and national and international health promotion priorities and policies such as the World Health Organization (WHO) charters and declarations for Health Promotion.

These priorities were consistent with VicHealth's obligations under the Tobacco Act of 1987. They also align with State Government policy and program directions, and national and international health promotion priorities and policies, such as the World Health Organization (WHO) charters and declarations for Health Promotion.

With a focus on reshaping systems for a healthier Victoria, the 2023-2033 VicHealth strategy is evidence-based to address complex emerging health challenges. Instead of tackling individual behaviour, VicHealth is addressing the underlying systems that impact health and well-being:

- Neighbourhood and built systems
- Commercial and economic systems
- Food systems

== Organisation ==
VicHealth has a Board of Governance that is responsible to the Victorian Minister for Health. The current CEO is Professor Anna Peeters AM, PhD. Her predecessors were Dr Sandro Demaio, Dr Lyn Roberts AO (Acting), Jerril Rechter, Todd Harper, Rob Moodie and Rhonda Galbally. Sir Gustav Nossal led VicHealth's first Board, followed by Professor John Funder. VicHealth's current Chair is the Hon Nicola Roxon.

Senior Management Team: The senior management team consists of various executives and directors who are responsible for overseeing specific departments or functional areas within the organization, such as health promotion, communications, finance, and research.

Departments/Units: VicHealth may have several departments or units, each focused on different aspects of health promotion and disease prevention. Examples of such departments might include programs targeting physical activity, mental health, tobacco control, alcohol, and healthy eating.

Health Promotion Programs: VicHealth designs and implements a range of health promotion programs and initiatives aimed at improving the health and well-being of Victorians. These programs may involve partnerships with government agencies, community organisations, and other stakeholders.

Research and Evaluation Team: VicHealth invests in research and evaluation to inform evidence-based strategies and measure the impact of their initiatives.

Partnerships and Collaborations: VicHealth collaborates with various organisations, government agencies, community groups, and NGOs to leverage their expertise, resources, and networks to achieve their health promotion goals.

== See also ==
- Health Promotion
- Tobacco control
