= Long Lost Family (American TV series) =

- Genre: Documentary
- Based on: Spoorloos by KRO-NCRV
- Presented by: Chris Jacobs; Lisa Joyner
- Country of origin: United States
- Original language: English
- No. of seasons: 6
- No. of episodes: 53

Production
- Executive producers: Pam Healey; John Hesling; Dan Peirson; Kathryn Takis
- Running time: 42–86 minutes
- Production company: Shed Media

Original release
- Network: TLC
- Release: March 6, 2016 – December 13, 2019

Related
- Long Lost Family (UK); Long Lost Family (Australia)

Long Lost Family is an American documentary television series based on the Dutch series Spoorloos created by broadcaster KRO-NCRV that premiered on March 6, 2016, on TLC. Presented by Chris Jacobs and Lisa Joyner, the show helps provide aid to individuals looking to be reunited with long-lost biological family members. The show is produced by Shed Media for TLC, and is co-sponsored by Ancestry.com, which provides family history research and DNA testing to help make discoveries possible.

== Format ==
The show follows the British series very closely, offering a chance for people who are desperate to find long lost relatives. The series helps a handful of people, some of whom have been searching in vain for many years, find the family members they are desperately seeking. It explores the background and context of each family's estrangement and tracks the detective work and often complex and emotional process of finding each lost relative before they are reunited. With the help and support of Chris and Lisa, each relative is guided and supported through the process of tracing the member of their family they have been desperately seeking.

== Episodes ==
=== Series overview ===
Season	Episodes	Originally released	
Season	Episodes	First released	Last released
1	8	March 6, 2016	April 24, 2016
2	13	February 12, 2017	April 25, 2017
3	6	November 6, 2017	December 11, 2017
4	9	April 8, 2018	May 16, 2018
5	9	October 8, 2018	December 17, 2018
6	8	October 25, 2019	December 13, 2019

=== Season 1 (2016) ===
No. overall	No. in season	Title	Original release date
1	1	"I've Waited for This Call for 45 Years"	March 6, 2016
2	2	"Your Mom's Been Here the Whole Time"	March 13, 2016
3	3	"Nobody Knew I Existed"	March 20, 2016
4	4	"I Should Have Fought Harder to Keep Her"	March 27, 2016
5	5	"Am I Who I Think I Am?"	April 3, 2016
6	6	"Why Did You Leave Me?"	April 10, 2016
7	7	"Everything Your Parents Told You Was a Lie"	April 17, 2016
8	8	"Alone in a Crowded Room"	April 24, 2016
9	9	"I Knew I’d Never See My Mom Again"	April 24, 2016

=== Season 2 (2017) ===
No. overall	No. in season	Title	Original release date
9	1	"There's No Easy Way to Say This"	February 12, 2017
Susan looks for both the biological mother she lost and the child she had to give up for adoption.
10	2	"The Court Said No, We Were Too Young"	February 19, 2017
Mary is searching for Monica 30 years after she was taken by CPS; In Lincoln Park, New Jersey, John and Lucy search for the son they gave up.
11	3	"I Want to Heal My Mother's Heart"	February 26, 2017
Sheryl desperately wants to fill in the blanks on her son that she gave up 46 years ago; Joshua is emotional about his search to heal his mother’s broken heart about the son she was forced to give away.
12	4	"Born Together, Stay Together"	March 5, 2017
At 22 years old, Tiffany discovers that her mother was never her biological parent, leaving her extremely confused; Twins Shirley and Sheila want to know the truth about where their birth mother went.
13	5	"One More Reason to Fight for My Life"	March 12, 2017
Tammy was separated from her two younger brothers Forrest and Daniel after they were taken away by CPS and feels overwhelmed and hopeless in her search for them; As a child, Tineke was bullied for being half black and longs to find her mother to feel accepted.
14	6	"Did You Have Dreams, Did You Follow Them?"	March 19, 2017
Musician Mark has been eager to find his mother after discovering that she was a cellist.
15	7	"All the Leaves Fell Off My Family Tree"	March 26, 2017
16	8	"The Last Time I Saw My Mother, I Was 5 Years Old"	April 2, 2017
17	9	"Do I Call Him My Son?"	April 9, 2017
18	10	"If You Bring Your Baby Home, You Can't Come Home"	April 16, 2017
19	11	"Am I a Secret She Had to Keep?"	April 23, 2017
20	12	"It's the Fulfillment Of a Promise"	April 24, 2017
21	13	"We Don't Need Anything From Them Besides Love"	April 25, 2017

=== Season 3 (2017) ===
No. overall	No. in season	Title	Original release date
22	1	"She Just Drove Off and Never Returned"	November 6, 2017
23	2	"My First Chapter Is Unwritten"	November 13, 2017
24	3	"If I'd Only Known About Her"	November 20, 2017
25	4	"The Letters Just Stopped Coming"	November 27, 2017
26	5	"There's More to Saying Sorry"	December 4, 2017
27	6	"My Birth Certificate Reads 'Jane Doe'"	December 11, 2017

=== Season 4 (2018) ===
No. overall	No. in season	Title	Original release date	US viewers (millions)
28	1	"The First and Last Time I Saw My Sister"	April 8, 2018	1.42
29	2	"She Never Came Back"	April 15, 2018	1.13
30	3	"You Think They Are Blood"	April 22, 2018	1.50
31	4	"You Have Been Loved Your Whole Life"	April 29, 2018	1.46
32	5	"28 Foster Homes"	May 6, 2018	1.42
33	6	"A Slamming Door"	May 13, 2018	1.18
34	7	"Nothing Short of a Miracle"	May 14, 2018	0.85
35	8	"This Is Your Truth"	May 15, 2018	0.94
36	9	"That Was My One Shot"	May 16, 2018	1.26

=== Season 5 (2018) ===
No. overall	No. in season	Title	Original release date	US viewers (millions)
37	1	"A Baby In A Shoe Box"	October 8, 2018	N/A
38	2	"A Mysterious Disappearance"	October 15, 2018	N/A
39	3	"Waiting a Lifetime"	October 22, 2018	N/A
40	4	"A Hole in My Soul"	October 29, 2018	N/A
41	5	"Feelings of Abandonment"	November 5, 2018	N/A
42	6	"Secrets Are Better Kept Than Said"	November 12, 2018	N/A
43	7	"She Chose Another Person Over Her Child"	November 19, 2018	N/A
44	8	"I Want To Go Back"	November 26, 2018	N/A
45	9	"She's Gone"	December 17, 2018	N/A

=== Season 6 (2019) ===
No. overall	No. in season	Title	Original release date	US viewers (millions)
46	1	"Why Couldn't They Raise Us?"	October 25, 2019	0.87
47	2	"I'm the Only One Left"	November 1, 2019	0.92
48	3	"Are They Looking For Me?"	November 8, 2019	0.89
49	4	"Not My Child to Keep"	November 15, 2019	0.91
50	5	"An Adult Orphan"	November 22, 2019	0.85
51	6	"What Family Feels Like"	November 29, 2019	0.88
52	7	"The Missing Piece"	December 6, 2019	0.93
53	8	"Switched in the Hospital"	December 13, 2019	0.93

== Production ==
=== Development ===
On February 2, 2016, it was announced that TLC had given the production a series order. It was reported that the series would be hosted by Chris Jacobs and Lisa Joyner and produced by Shed Media.

Season one of Long Lost Family premiered on March 6, 2016. On June 9, 2016, it was announced that TLC had renewed the series for a second season. Season 3 had 6 additional episodes for 2017 and began airing on November 6, 2017. On March 20, 2018, it was announced that the series had been renewed for a third season set to premiere on April 8, 2018. On September 7, 2018, it was announced that additional episodes for 2018 were expected to premiere on October 8, 2018.

=== Marketing ===
Alongside the initial series announcement, TLC released the first teaser trailer for the series. On March 20, 2018, TLC released the official trailer for season three.

== International versions ==
The British program began airing in 2011 and has so far distributed fourteen series and several specials. It is hosted by Davina McCall and Nicky Campbell.

There is also a Norwegian version of called Sporløs that has been airing on Norwegian channel TV 2 since 2010 with six seasons so far.

An Australian version of Long Lost Family, hosted by Chrissie Swan and Anh Do, began airing around the same time as the U.S. version in 2016, but was canceled by 2017.
