= Emergency (2020 TV series) =

- Genre: Factual television
- Narrated by: Susie Godfrey
- Country of origin: Australia
- Original language: English
- No. of seasons: 5
- No. of episodes: 50

Production
- Executive producer: Virginia Hodgson
- Producers: Tania Palich, Lorna Musgrove
- Production location: Royal Melbourne Hospital
- Cinematography: Rod Campbell, Mark Hooper, Tim Mills, Campbell Munro
- Running time: 60 minutes (including commercials)
- Production company: WTFN

Original release
- Network: Nine Network
- Release: 8 July 2020 – present

Related
- Paramedics

Emergency is an Australian factual television series that looks at the everyday working of doctors and nurses in the Royal Melbourne Hospital, and is narrated by Australian actress Susie Godfrey.

The show premiered on 8 July 2020, and focuses on the reveal the tribulations and triumphs of the Royal's dedicated doctors and nurses as they deal with victims of vicious assaults, horror car crashes and other tragedies, caring for the constant stream of patients coming through the door every day.

The show was renewed for a second season, which began airing 24 May 2021. Season 3 aired from 18 July 2022. Season 4 was announced in 2022 and aired from 19 October 2023. The fifth season later premiered on 7 November 2024.

The series is retitled "The Emergency Ward" for its UK broadcasts.

== Episodes ==
=== Series overview ===
Series	Episodes	Originally released	
Series	Episodes	First released	Last released
1	10	8 July 2020	9 September 2020
2	10	24 May 2021	17 November 2021
3	10	18 July 2022	22 September 2022
4	10	19 October 2023	22 February 2024
5	10	7 November 2024	16 October 2025

=== Season 1 (2020) ===
No. overall	No. in season	Title	Original release date	Australia viewers (millions)
1	1	"Episode 1"	8 July 2020	630,000
Dr Emma West is tasked with assessing an aggressive man who has been stabbed. Meanwhile, Dr Michelle Thornhill is confronted with 30 year old expectant mother Fraya, who has a dislocated shoulder, and Dr Jonathan Papson and Emergency Specialist Dr Mya Cubitt have to attend to 23-year-old Jack, whose car slammed into a pole.
2	2	"Episode 2"	15 July 2020	646,000
A gunshot victim arrives under police guard and Dr Sarah fears the patient could die from his injuries. Dr Jonathan treats a critical footy player after an on-field collision. Nurse Lucy worries a pregnant patient can't feel her baby move.
3	3	"Episode 3"	22 July 2020	591,000
Dr Fiona has to stop a young man's heart beating, in order to save him. A patient with a gruesome head wound has Dr Sarah on full alert. Nurse Julie helps a smitten young couple who spend most of their first date in emergency.
4	4	"Episode 4"	29 July 2020	603,000
Dr Mark tries to help a car crash patient under police guard, but the man appears to be hiding something suspicious in his underpants. Dr Miriam examines a cheerful 82-year-old biker with fractures, who suddenly takes a turn for the worse.
5	5	"Episode 5"	5 August 2020	568,000
Dr Mark assembles a crack team to save a man with life-threatening gunshot wounds. Dr Jonathan suspects a surf-coach has a shattered leg from a horror car crash, which could spell the end of the young man's career.
6	6	"Episode 6"	12 August 2020	489,000
Dr Emma's patient could lose her fingers after a high-speed car crash. A gunshot victim has Dr Michael on high alert. Dr Michelle stitches up a young man who walked into a wall while checking his phone.
7	7	"Episode 7"	19 August 2020	598,000
Security crash-tackles a violent man trying to smear blood onto hospital staff. Dr Jonathan's car crash patient wasn't wearing a seatbelt, but she's more worried what her dad will say. Dr Mya's scared patient has an unstoppable nosebleed.
8	8	"Episode 8"	26 August 2020	553,000
Dr Steve's young patient could lose his hand after a shocking accident at an abattoir. A severe asthmatic struggles to breathe, but Dr Bjorn suspects another trigger. A wayward spider sends a high-speed road crash victim to Dr Jana.
9	9	"Episode 9"	2 September 2020	547,000
A life hangs in the balance as Dr Emma rushes to meet a critically injured road trauma victim at the helipad. Dr Lauren treats an American schoolboy who plunged 10 metres down a cliff and is bleeding heavily from an open fracture.
10	10	"Episode 10"	9 September 2020	585,000
Dr Miriam treats a heavily pregnant mum-to-be who collapsed at a train station platform, falling face-first and landing on her stomach. Dr Sarah fears for a cyclist who was hit by a car and can't feel his feet.

=== Season 2 (2021) ===
No. overall	No. in season	Title	Original release date	Australia viewers (millions)
11	1	"Episode 1"	24 May 2021	302,000
Dr Mya and Nurse Ebony brace themselves as paramedics bring in a man who's been on a two-day drug bender. Dr Emma calls in back-up to save a mum who's clinging to life.
12	2	"Episode 2"	31 May 2021	306,000
In Royal Melbourne Emergency, a teen jockey has been crushed under a horse, fracturing her pelvis. This potentially career-ending injury isn't Dr Mya Cubitt's biggest worry.
13	3	"Episode 3"	7 June 2021	304,000
At Royal Melbourne emergency, an abattoir worker has cut her fingers off. Can Dr Bjorn Makein and nurse Sarah Thomas save her hand?
14	4	"Episode 4"	14 June 2021	357,000
A crane operator is crushed under falling steel at work and is flown to The Royal Melbourne. Dr Jonathan Papson calls in reinforcements as the young worker's vital signs worsen.
15	5	"Episode 5"	21 June 2021	369,000
A teen has fractured her pelvis in a road accident. Dr Luke De La Rue reassures the promising footballer. Dr Miriam Yassa helps an off-road motorbiker who collided with a roo.
16	6	"Episode 6"	28 June 2021	335,000
At Royal Melbourne Emergency a paramedic becomes the patient after stepping on a deadly snake while jogging. Drs Dunne and Alexander treat a seriously injured grandmother.
17	7	"Episode 7"	5 July 2021	407,000
In The Royal Melbourne Hospital’s Emergency Department, Dr Sarah Whitelaw battles to save a teen driver with major head injuries after rolling his car. A trail bike rider crashes horribly, but impresses Dr Michelle Thornhill with his wit.
18	8	"Episode 8"	12 July 2021	299,000
Doctors rush to save a man bleeding internally after being thrown from a horse. A law student's condition puzzles Dr Luke. Dr George has grave fears for a handy man.
19	9	"Episode 9"	10 November 2021	N/A
20	10	"Episode 10"	17 November 2021	N/A

=== Season 3 (2022) ===
No. overall	No. in season	Title	Original release date	Australia viewers (millions)
21	1	"Episode 1"	18 July 2022	N/A
22	2	"Episode 2"	25 July 2022	N/A
23	3	"Episode 3"	1 August 2022	N/A
24	4	"Episode 4"	8 August 2022	390,000
25	5	"Episode 5"	15 August 2022	354,000
26	6	"Episode 6"	22 August 2022	358,000
27	7	"Episode 7"	29 August 2022	373,000
28	8	"Episode 8"	5 September 2022	347,000
29	9	"Episode 9"	12 September 2022	359,000
30	10	"Episode 10"	22 September 2022	N/A

=== Season 4 (2023-2024) ===
No. overall	No. in season	Title	Original release date	Australia viewers (millions)
31	1	"Episode 1"	19 October 2023	282,000
32	2	"Episode 2"	26 October 2023	298,000
33	3	"Episode 3"	2 November 2023	309,000
34	4	"Episode 4"	9 November 2023	333,000
35	5	"Episode 5"	23 November 2023	337,000
36	6	"Episode 6"	30 November 2023	315,000
37	7	"Episode 7"	1 February 2024	1,193,000
38	8	"Episode 8"	8 February 2024	1,162,000
39	9	"Episode 9"	15 February 2024	1,048,000
40	10	"Episode 10"	22 February 2024	1,191,000

=== Season 5 (2024-2025) ===
No. overall	No. in season	Title	Original release date	Australia viewers (millions)
41	1	"Episode 1"	7 November 2024	N/A
At The Royal Melbourne Hospital, time is critical as Dr Scott Taylor's unresponsive patient deteriorates with a suspected brain bleed. Dr Tristan Harding must straighten a young man's dislocated ankle before the blood supply cuts off.
