= Lisa Joyner =

American television personality

- Joyner in 2026
- Born: Lisa Marie Joyner; December 31, 1966 (age 59); El Cajon, California
- Occupations: Television personality, entertainment reporter
- Spouse: Jon Cryer (m. 2007)
- Children: 1

Lisa Marie Joyner (born December 31, 1966) is an American entertainment reporter, and television host.

== Life and career ==
Joyner was born to Malaysian parents in El Cajon, California and was raised by adoptive parents in Fort Myers, Florida. She has reported on celebrity news in the Los Angeles area for KTTV and KCBS-TV. She first gained national recognition for her InFANity segments on the TV Guide Network. Joyner has been married to actor Jon Cryer since 2007. She and her husband adopted a baby girl, whom they named Daisy. Joyner is both an adoptive parent and an adoptee; in her 30s, she searched for and found her birth family. Along with Tim Green, she hosted the US version of Find My Family on the ABC network. The show reunited adoptees with their birth families. In March 2016, she started co-hosting Long Lost Family with Chris Jacobs on TLC. Per confirmation from Cryer, Joyner and he are both practicing Methodists.
