= Ambulance (TV programme) =

British television series

- Genre: Documentary
- Directed by: Bruce Fletcher
- Narrated by: Kris Marshall (2016); Christopher Eccleston (2017–2026)
- Composer: Matthew Cracknell
- Country of origin: United Kingdom
- Original language: English
- No. of series: 16
- No. of episodes: 107

Production
- Running time: 57–60 minutes
- Production company: Dragonfly

Original release
- Network: BBC One
- Release: 27 September 2016 – 15 April 2026

Related
- Ambulance Australia

Ambulance is a documentary series that follows the "life and death decisions on the frontline". Broadcast on BBC One, the format showcases their work "from control rooms to the crews on the street".

The series was broadcast from 27 September 2016 to 15 April 2026. As of November 2026, Ambulance has yet to be commissioned by BBC One for any further series.

== Episodes ==
=== Series overview ===
| Series | Ambulance Service | Episodes | | Originally released | |
| Series | Ambulance Service | Episodes | | First released | Last released |
|---|---|---|---|---|---|
| 1 | London | 3 | | 27 September 2016 | 11 October 2016 |
| 2 | West Midlands | 8 | | 24 August 2017 | 12 October 2017 |
| 3 | West Midlands | 8 | | 26 April 2018 | 29 November 2018 |
| 4 | North West | 8 | | 18 October 2018 | 16 May 2019 |
| 5 | North West | 12 | 6 | 30 May 2019 | 11 July 2019 |
| 5 | North West | 12 | 6 | 4 June 2020 | 16 July 2020 |
| 6 | London | 8 | | 16 September 2020 | 4 November 2020 |
| 7 | North West | 6 | | 12 August 2021 | 23 September 2021 |
| 8 | North West | 6 | | 30 September 2021 | 1 November 2021 |
| 9 | North East | 6 | | 11 August 2022 | 6 October 2022 |
| 10 | North East | 6 | | 13 October 2022 | 6 February 2023 |
| 11 | North West | 6 | | 24 August 2023 | 28 September 2023 |
| 12 | North West | 6 | | 31 January 2024 | 20 March 2024 |
| 13 | London | 6 | | 17 October 2024 | 21 November 2024 |
| 14 | London | 6 | | 24 April 2025 | 12 June 2025 |
| 15 | Yorkshire | 6 | | 21 October 2025 | 25 November 2025 |
| 16 | Yorkshire | 6 | | 11 March 2026 | 15 April 2026 |

=== Series 1: London Ambulance Service (2016) ===
| No. overall | No. in series | Original release date | Viewers (millions) |
|---|---|---|---|
| 1 | 1 | 27 September 2016 | 4.43 |
The first episode reveals the dilemmas faced by the London Ambulance Service as they are forced to bump patients down the queue so they can prioritise the sickest, deal with time wasters and cope with the ever-present threat that a major incident is just a 999 call away. Closing Song: I'm Getting Ready by Michael Kiwanuka
| 2 | 2 | 4 October 2016 | 4.95 |
Episode two joins the staff in the nerve-centre control room on the night shift, when amongst the thousands of calls they receive, they also have to contend with hoaxers, frequent callers and runaway patients. At one point, 125 patients are waiting for assistance and the ambulance allocators are forced to prioritise the sickest patients, even if that means bumping others down the queue. Closing Song: Coles Corner by Richard Hawley
| 3 | 3 | 11 October 2016 | 4.16 |
The London Ambulance Service brace themselves for a demanding weekend shift. As Londoners head out to play, the Ambulance Service often has to pick up the pieces. They need prepare for a torrent of cases, all with their own unique challenges. Closing Song: Wheels by Grand Drive

=== Series 2: West Midlands Ambulance Service (2017) ===
| No. overall | No. in series | Original release date | Viewers (millions) |
|---|---|---|---|
| 4 | 1 | 24 August 2017 | 4.45 |
Paramedics race to help a man that has suddenly collapsed.
| 5 | 2 | 31 August 2017 | 4.90 |
The highly skilled team race to help a patient who has been stabbed five times.
| 6 | 3 | 7 September 2017 | 4.69 |
A woman having a heart attack is taken to the Cardiac Unit at Royal Stoke Hospital.
| 7 | 4 | 14 September 2017 | 4.67 |
A specialist team is dispatched to a serious car accident in Warwickshire.
| 8 | 5 | 21 September 2017 | 4.72 |
A call comes in from a terrified mum whose toddler is fitting.
| 9 | 6 | 28 September 2017 | 4.27 |
Justin helps deliver a baby, goes to a prolific caller and surprises a drunk patient.
| 10 | 7 | 5 October 2017 | 4.38 |
Two brothers battling with addiction strikes a personal chord for paramedic Nina.
| 11 | 8 | 12 October 2017 | 4.57 |
The West Midlands Ambulance Service must deal with the severe consequences of Storm Doris.

=== Series 3: West Midlands Ambulance Service (2018) ===
| No. overall | No. in series | Original release date | Viewers (millions) |
|---|---|---|---|
| 12 | 1 | 26 April 2018 | 4.38 |
A day shift takes an unexpected turn for two West Midlands Ambulance Service Paramedics.
| 13 | 2 | 3 May 2018 | 4.35 |
Extra staff are brought in on New Year's Eve, but the night doesn't go as planned.
| 14 | 3 | 10 May 2018 | 4.06 |
A West Midlands Ambulance Service specialist trauma team are called to a brutal stabbing.
| 15 | 4 | 17 May 2018 | 3.95 |
A day shift with paramedic crews brings a spike in mental health cases.
| 16 | 5 | 24 May 2018 | 4.55 |
A specialist paramedic attends a machete attack but his less urgent jobs are as troubling.
| 17 | 6 | 31 May 2018 | 4.44 |
It is the last Saturday night before Christmas and Sui has to prioritise stabbing victims.
| 18 | 7 | 22 November 2018 | N/A |
West Midlands Ambulance Service must manage problems of a winter NHS crisis that has left patients queuing in the corridors of Royal Stoke Hospital.
| 19 | 8 | 29 November 2018 | N/A |
West Midlands Ambulance Service crews pay a heavy emotional toll after attending troubling cases of addiction and attempted suicide.

=== Series 4: North West Ambulance Service (2018–2019) ===
| No. overall | No. in series | Original release date | Viewers (millions) |
|---|---|---|---|
| 20 | 1 | 18 October 2018 | 4.22 |
Over a busy weekend in Manchester, North West Ambulance Service paramedics Andrea and Glynn attend an RTC, while Debbie and Shaun try to persuade a homeless man to go to hospital.
| 21 | 2 | 25 October 2018 | 3.81 |
During a 12-hour night shift with North West Ambulance Service, call handler Elly tackles an increasing volume of calls, and there are surprises for paramedics April and Clare.
| 22 | 3 | 1 November 2018 | 4.40 |
A suspected terror incident requires a large-scale response and brings back memories of the Manchester Arena attack for the paramedics.
| 23 | 4 | 6 December 2018 | N/A |
Call handler Joe faces his first unsupervised shift answering 999 calls on a busy night for the North West Ambulance Service.
| 24 | 5 | 25 April 2019 | 4.26 |
A Friday night shift takes an unexpected turn for paramedic Jon. A panicked caller needs help for a friend who has given birth in a hotel room despite not knowing she was pregnant.
| 25 | 6 | 2 May 2019 | 3.92 |
Joining North West Ambulance Service for a twelve-hour night shift. Call handler Elly tackles an increasing volume of calls, and there are surprises for paramedics April and Clare.
| 26 | 7 | 9 May 2019 | N/A |
The BAFTA-winning series follows ambulance crews in the wake of England's defeat at the 2018 World Cup.
| 27 | 8 | 16 May 2019 | 3.82 |
While most enjoy a hot May bank holiday weekend in Manchester, North West Ambulance Service paramedics Gary and Claire need face matters of life and death.

=== Series 5: North West Ambulance Service (2019–2020) ===
Series 5, again following the North West Ambulance Service, was split into two parts: the six episodes aired in 2019 were filmed in Manchester, and the six episodes shown in 2020 were filmed in Liverpool.

| No. overall | No. in series | Original release date | Viewers (millions) |
|---|---|---|---|
Part 1 – Manchester
| 28 | 1 | 30 May 2019 | 3.93 |
Call handler Laura offers life-saving advice to a panicked 999 caller.
| 29 | 2 | 6 June 2019 | N/A (<3.82) (Note: Not reported in the weekly top 15 programmes for four-screen viewer ratings.) |
Paramedics Alice and Lauren of the North West Ambulance Service respond to an emergency call for a baby not breathing.
| 30 | 3 | 13 June 2019 | N/A (<3.88) |
Doctor Ian and paramedic Nikki see the human consequences of youth violence when they attend a 13-year-old who has been stabbed and two young men who've been shot.
| 31 | 4 | 20 June 2019 | N/A (<4.15) |
North West Ambulance Service faces the pressure of the busiest day of the winter so far with an overwhelming volume of calls and severe delays handing over patients in hospital.
| 32 | 5 | 4 July 2019 | N/A |
Advanced paramedic Luke puts his specialist training to use when he is dispatched to a life-threatening motorcycle accident.
| 33 | 6 | 11 July 2019 | N/A |
Following the North West Ambulance Service on their hectic shifts.
Part 2 – Liverpool
| 34 | 1 | 4 June 2020 | N/A |
Following ambulance teams attending to the 1.4 million people of Merseyside on St Patrick's Day weekend
| 35 | 2 | 11 June 2020 | N/A |
The control room team feel the pressure on a busy night as they receive calls concerning a cocaine binge, a traffic collision and an accident involving a cherry picker.
| 36 | 3 | 18 June 2020 | N/A |
North West Ambulance Service mobilises extra resources as thousands of visitors arrive in Liverpool for the Grand National.
| 37 | 4 | 2 July 2020 | N/A |
Paramedics treat a burglar who has broken his leg escaping from the scene of his crime, and the air ambulance team receive a call about a school pupil who may have fallen from a bridge.
| 38 | 5 | 9 July 2020 | N/A |
A man found slumped in his car in the city centre turns on the good samaritan who called an ambulance for him, leaving the caller needing emergency hospital treatment.
| 39 | 6 | 16 July 2020 | N/A |
Call handler Brogan has to guide one caller through the process of performing lifesaving CPR while they wait for an ambulance to arrive.

=== Series 6: London Ambulance Service (2020) ===
| No. overall | No. in series | Original release date | Viewers (millions) |
|---|---|---|---|
| 40 | 1 | 16 September 2020 | N/A |
Filmed in the autumn of 2019, cameras follow a new cast of characters from the London Ambulance Service as they care for the nine million people of the city.
| 41 | 2 | 23 September 2020 | N/A |
Joining ambulance staff caring for nine million people on a day of political protests in the capital.
| 42 | 3 | 30 September 2020 | N/A |
The Friday night shift takes its toll on crews in the capital as they deal with reports of an armed male and two stabbings.
| 43 | 4 | 7 October 2020 | N/A |
Payday in London results in a high volume of calls for the ambulance service and increased violence.
| 44 | 5 | 14 October 2020 | N/A |
Following ambulance crews on duty in London on Halloween 2019. Crews respond to a significant incident at a bus crash in Orpington.
| 45 | 6 | 21 October 2020 | N/A |
This episode shines a light on mental health services and the struggles faced by others which have a deep and lasting impact on the staff and crews.
| 46 | 7 | 28 October 2020 | N/A |
A 999 call for a patient who has been found hanging takes priority on the night shift.
| 47 | 8 | 4 November 2020 | N/A |
A Friday night shift takes its toll on crews as they deal with reports of an armed male and two stabbings in the capital.

=== Series 7: North West Ambulance Service (2021) ===
| No. overall | No. in series | Original release date | Viewers (millions) |
|---|---|---|---|
| 48 | 1 | 12 August 2021 | N/A |
Storm Christoph and the second wave of the COVID pandemic cause mounting pressures for NWAS crews on Merseyside.
| 49 | 2 | 19 August 2021 | N/A |
The NHS in the North West battles with the second wave of COVID-19.
| 50 | 3 | 26 August 2021 | N/A |
The crews attend continuous COVID-19 cases, including a woman who is 20-weeks pregnant.
| 51 | 4 | 2 September 2021 | N/A |
Focusing on mental health crisis' across Liverpool, including an asylum seeker struggling with isolation.
| 52 | 5 | 9 September 2021 | N/A |
North West Ambulance Service calls up military personnel to help them care for the public effectively as the Covid-19 pandemic takes its toll.
| 53 | 6 | 23 September 2021 | N/A |
A quiet start to the night shift is broken by a 999 call on behalf of a 13-year-old patient who is stuck on a bus having dislocated her knee.

=== Series 8: North West Ambulance Service (2021) ===
| No. overall | No. in series | Original release date | Viewers (millions) |
|---|---|---|---|
| 54 | 1 | 30 September 2021 | N/A |
A call to help a patient threatening to jump off a bridge requires an urgent response during a busy day shift for the staff of North West Ambulance Service.
| 55 | 2 | 7 October 2021 | N/A |
Crewmates Dec and Nicole are urgently dispatched to a baby who has stopped breathing, and they also attend to a 12-year-old patient with a history of being bullied.
| 56 | 3 | 14 October 2021 | N/A |
A 999 call for a patient who has fallen from a horse in a remote area takes priority for crewmates Chris and Lee on a very busy day shift in Lancashire.
| 57 | 4 | 21 October 2021 | N/A |
One year on from the beginning of national lockdown, Lancashire ambulance crews attend to patients whose health problems have been bought on or exacerbated by isolation caused by the lockdown.
| 58 | 5 | 28 October 2021 | N/A |
On a busy night shift in Lancashire, a call for a patient threatening to take his life by walking into the sea in Blackpool takes priority for the North West Ambulance Service.
| 59 | 6 | 1 November 2021 | N/A |
As society opens up, the Easter bank holiday has consequences for North West Ambulance Service. A call for a patient stuck in a forest in Cumbria takes priority.

=== Series 9: North East Ambulance Service (2022) ===
| No. overall | No. in series | Original release date | Viewers (millions) |
|---|---|---|---|
| 60 | 1 | 11 August 2022 | N/A |
A crew from the North East Ambulance Service attends to a family who arrived in the UK just 17 days earlier as refugees from Iraq.
| 61 | 2 | 18 August 2022 | N/A |
A high number of Category 1 emergency calls puts the North East Ambulance Service and the hospitals in the region under relentless pressure.
| 62 | 3 | 25 August 2022 | N/A |
A 999 call for a patient driving the wrong way up a slip road kicks off another busy shift for the team covering the 2,300 square miles of Teesside.
| 63 | 4 | 1 September 2022 | N/A |
Crewmates Joe and Hayley attend a number of emergencies, including a baby who is not responding, a centenarian who has had a fall, and a patient who has jumped off a bridge.
| 64 | 5 | 29 September 2022 | N/A |
The North East Ambulance Service and Great North Air Ambulance Service work as a team after multiple urgent 999 calls alert them to a collision on the motorway.
| 65 | 6 | 6 October 2022 | N/A |
Crewmates Paula and Phil attend a patient who is feeling suicidal, and the call-out takes a worrying turn when the patient begins hallucinating in the back of the ambulance.

=== Series 10: North East Ambulance Service (2022–23) ===
This series was split into two halves, with the first three episodes broadcast in October 2022. The series' last three episodes - which were originally planned to air in November 2022, were put on hold due to the 2022 FIFA World Cup tournament. It was then revealed during the 2022-23 festive season, that the remaining episodes from the series would resume broadcasting on Wednesday 4 January 2023.

| No. overall | No. in series | Original release date | Viewers (millions) |
|---|---|---|---|
| 66 | 1 | 13 October 2022 | N/A |
A night shift takes a turn for the worse as multiple Darlington crews respond to a category-1 call for a patient in cardiac arrest.
| 67 | 2 | 20 October 2022 | N/A |
Chris and Iqra respond to an urgent 999 call for a suicidal patient who is struggling to pay the bills amid the increasing cost of living crisis.
| 68 | 3 | 27 October 2022 | N/A |
Staff shortages and a rise in 999 calls stretch the North East Ambulance Service to its limits, meaning only the most critical patients will get an ambulance.
| 69 | 4 | 4 January 2023 | N/A |
The North East Ambulance Service responds to multiple 999 calls for patients at breaking point and struggling with their mental health.
| 70 | 5 | 11 January 2023 | N/A |
A suicidal patient phones in a bomb threat, and the crews have a very busy St Patrick's Day.
| 71 | 6 | 6 February 2023 | N/A |
Emily and Gayle treat an 81-year-old diabetic who has fallen off his mobility scooter.

=== Series 11: North West Ambulance Service (2023) ===
This series was filmed across Lancashire and Greater Manchester during the ongoing NHS strikes, affecting paramedics on the frontline and behind the picket line. The series began on 24 August 2023, for a six-week run, until 28 September 2023.

| No. overall | No. in series | Original release date | Viewers (millions) |
|---|---|---|---|
| 72 | 1 | 24 August 2023 | N/A |
Filmed during a historical period of uncertainty for the NHS, this episode introduces the staff of NWAS across Lancashire, from the picket line to the front line.
| 73 | 2 | 31 August 2023 | N/A |
Multiple resources are dispatched to a patient who has fallen 20 feet from a tree and requires urgent treatment for a suspected broken back and open wrist fracture.
| 74 | 3 | 7 September 2023 | N/A |
A busy weekend night shift across Lancashire sees advanced paramedic Shaun dispatched to a baby born in the passenger seat of a car.
| 75 | 4 | 14 September 2023 | N/A |
Crewmates Mandy and Lauren help an elderly patient at the local boatyard, who has been on the floor for two days before being discovered by his neighbour.
| 76 | 5 | 21 September 2023 | N/A |
An urgent call from someone threatening to use a nerve agent against the emergency services leads to a major incident standby being declared.
| 77 | 6 | 28 September 2023 | N/A |
Ambulance crews respond to a road traffic accident where a man who has severely injured himself requires advanced pain relief.

=== Series 12: North West Ambulance Service (2024) ===
The series began on 31 January 2024, for a six-week run until 20 March 2024. Due to scheduling conflicts regarding the 2024 Six Nations Championship, there were no episodes on 7 February 2024 and 28 February 2024.

| No. overall | No. in series | Original release date | Viewers (millions) |
|---|---|---|---|
| 78 | 1 | 31 January 2024 | N/A |
Multiple emergency services respond to two separate reports of unexploded bombs in Greater Manchester, one with a primary school and nursery nearby.
| 79 | 2 | 14 February 2024 | N/A |
Multiple resources are dispatched to a patient who has fallen 20 feet from a tree and requires urgent treatment for a suspected broken back and open wrist fracture.
| 80 | 3 | 21 February 2024 | N/A |
The ambulance service responds to two separate calls for patients with severe burns, both in need of urgent treatment at the region’s only specialist burns unit.
| 81 | 4 | 6 March 2024 | N/A |
Ambulance crews struggle to deal with life threatening emergencies while also being the last resort for those who have no one else to turn to.
| 82 | 5 | 13 March 2024 | N/A |
On the Easter bank holiday weekend, the ambulance service receive a spike in the number of mental health-related calls.
| 83 | 6 | 20 March 2024 | N/A |
While ambulances queue outside hospital with their patients, care is delayed for others ringing 999.

=== Series 13: London Ambulance Service (2024) ===
Filmed in Spring 2024, the series was aired from 17 October 2024 until 21 November 2024, and follows crews of the London Ambulance Service.

| No. overall | No. in series | Title | Original release date | Viewers (millions) |
|---|---|---|---|---|
| 84 | 1 | "Crew under Attack" | 17 October 2024 | N/A |
London Ambulance Service manage a multi-storey flat fire and face the impact of assaults, both on patients and themselves.
| 85 | 2 | "Fire at the Police Station" | 24 October 2024 | N/A |
As crews are diverted to a fire, the ambulance service is placed under pressure.
| 86 | 3 | "Hoax Caller" | 31 October 2024 | N/A |
In the control room, dispatchers tackle a persistent hoax caller.
| 87 | 4 | "Shooting on the High Street" | 7 November 2024 | N/A |
Pete leads a team in the tactical operations centre, responding to reports of a shooting.
| 88 | 5 | "What Are You Scared Of?" | 14 November 2024 | N/A |
Paramedics race to save the foot of a patient who has fallen from a climbing wall.
| 89 | 6 | "No Room at A&E" | 21 November 2024 | N/A |
Delays across hospitals in south west London leave patients waiting for an ambulance.

=== Series 14: London Ambulance Service (2025) ===
Filmed in 2024, the series was aired from 24 April 2025. As with the previous series it again follows crews of the London Ambulance Service. Due to scheduling conflicts with the 80th anniversary celebrations of VE Day and the second semi-final of the Eurovision Song Contest there were no episodes on 8 May 2025 and 15 May 2025.

| No. overall | No. in series | Title | Original release date | Viewers (millions) |
|---|---|---|---|---|
| 90 | 1 | "Crisis on the Streets" | 24 April 2025 | N/A |
One of London's specialist mental health cars helps to ease pressure on the service from the growing number of patients in crisis, including a homeless university student living rough.
| 91 | 2 | "After Dark" | 1 May 2025 | N/A |
As London sleeps, crews battle to care for vulnerable, lonely and critically ill patients, including an elderly man who has suffered catastrophic trauma after a fall downstairs.
| 92 | 3 | "XL Bully Attack" | 22 May 2025 | N/A |
After a frantic 999 caller reports witnessing a relative being attacked by an XL bully dog. Crews are dispatched, but the dangerous dog is still on the loose.
| 93 | 4 | "Stabbed on the Streets" | 29 May 2025 | N/A |
Crews respond to a patient in traumatic cardiac arrest after being stabbed. With his life hanging in the balance, doctors have no choice but to operate on him at the roadside.
| 94 | 5 | "Stalker on the Line" | 5 June 2025 | N/A |
Call handler Caelainn and her colleagues are sexually harassed by a persistent caller using a withheld number, which makes it hard to block his repeated calls.
| 95 | 6 | "Saved by a Stranger" | 12 June 2025 | N/A |
Patient Ron suddenly stops breathing whilst visiting London from the Isle of Wight. With his condition critical, a bystander intervenes to try to save his life.

=== Series 15: Yorkshire Ambulance Service (2025) ===
Filmed in 2025, the series was aired from 21 October 2025. It followed crews of the Yorkshire Ambulance Service.

Episode 5 of the series that aired on 18 November 2025 was the show’s 100th episode.

| No. overall | No. in series | Title | Original release date | Viewers (millions) |
|---|---|---|---|---|
| 96 | 1 | "Bradford Nights" | 21 October 2025 | N/A |
Bailey is left shaken by the sudden decline of a regular patient who has been left feeling suicidal after discovering the shelter he lives in is closing down.
| 97 | 2 | "The Spy Who Waited" | 28 October 2025 | N/A |
As hospitals in North Yorkshire face overwhelming pressure, Adam and Joe prove laughter is the best medicine as they care for an elderly patient suffering from stroke symptoms.
| 98 | 3 | "School Run Collision" | 4 November 2025 | N/A |
Every parent’s worst nightmare unfolds when five-year-old Harry is hit by a car. Paramedics battle through rush hour traffic to reach him.
| 99 | 4 | "Stranger in the Dales" | 11 November 2025 | N/A |
Ingleton crew Barney and Chloe are dispatched to a woman who is discovered collapsed at a bus stop and are shocked to discover how and why she got there.
| 100 | 5 | "Broken Heart" | 18 November 2025 | N/A |
Critical care paramedic Nick is dispatched to a 78-year-old man who was found collapsed at home. Surrounded by the patient’s family, Nick must deliver some heartbreaking news.
| 101 | 6 | "Don’t Let Go" | 25 November 2025 | N/A |
Every second counts as critical care paramedic Zach tries to stabilise an 11-year-old boy who has been seriously injured in a multi-car crash.

=== Series 16: Yorkshire Ambulance Service (2026) ===
Filmed in 2025, the series first aired from 11 March 2026. It followed crews of the Yorkshire Ambulance Service.

| No. overall | No. in series | Title | Original release date | Viewers (millions) |
|---|---|---|---|---|
| 102 | 1 | "Punched by a Patient" | 11 March 2026 | N/A |
A persistent and abusive caller causes major disruption for the team in control, and crewmates Sarah and Louise are shaken after an attack on them by a patient having a seizure.
| 103 | 2 | "The Last Holiday" | 18 March 2026 | N/A |
Alan watches on as crewmates Tracey and Lauren help his wife Jean from the floor of their caravan. Alarm bells ring as checks reveal she is suffering from life-threatening sepsis.
| 104 | 3 | "The Siege" | 25 March 2026 | N/A |
Central Leeds crew, Nagina and Mo, are called to a scene where police are negotiating an end to a siege at which a man is threatening to harm himself and the officers attending.
| 105 | 4 | "Down the Ditch" | 1 April 2026 | N/A |
Critical care paramedic Matt administers pain relief to patient Neil, before he is rushed to hospital, where doctors will assess him for suspected head and neck injuries.
| 106 | 5 | "Lost in the Woods" | 8 April 2026 | N/A |
The team in ambulance control try to assist paramedics Sam and Sophie, who are deep in woodland struggling to locate a patient they’ve been told has had a fit while out on a walk.
| 107 | 6 | "Hold Me Tight" | 15 April 2026 | N/A |
Alistair attends to Paul, who has fallen onto concrete from a ladder. The specialist paramedic must assess his multiple injuries and reassure his patient, who fears he is dying.

== Reception ==
Michael Hogan, writing for The Daily Telegraph gave the second series 4 stars, saying "All human life was here. We witnessed birth, death and resurrection in the space of just two shifts. It sure beats Casualty".

== Awards and nominations ==
In 2018, Ambulance won its first major award, the BAFTA for the best factual series or strand.

| Year | Award | Category | Result |
|---|---|---|---|
| 2018 | British Academy Television Awards | Best Factual Series or Strand | Won |

== International versions ==
Ambulance Australia screens on Network Ten in Australia.

The first series of Ambulance (אמבולנס), was aired on Reshet in Israel during 2018.
