= Chris Jacobs (television host) =

American television personality

Christopher K. Jacobs
- Born: January 30, 1970 (age 56); Chicago, Illinois
- Occupation: Television host
- Years active: 1995-present
- Notable credit(s): Overhaulin', The Insider, Entertainment Tonight, Long Lost Family

Chris Jacobs (born January 30, 1970) is a television host and personality. He is the host of Long Lost Family on TLC and also the host of Overhaulin'. For several years, he was an on-air talent for the NFL Network, guest hosting several episodes of "NFL AM" as well as "Up to the Minute" updates. He formerly hosted The Insider and worked as a correspondent for Entertainment Tonight.

== Biography ==
=== Career ===
Jacobs had moderate success with roles in television (like CSI: Crime Scene Investigation ) (Two and a Half Men), film (like 44 Minutes: The North Hollywood Shoot-Out) and commercial projects for eight years before being tapped to co-host Overhaulin' in 2004. After the show went on hiatus in 2008, he co-presented The Insider with Lara Spencer from 2009 to 2011.

On March 5, 2011, it was announced that he had been named a correspondent for Entertainment Tonight. He left ET in early 2013 after Overhaulin' returned for a sixth season on Velocity in the fall of 2012.

From 2013, when Jacobs left Entertainment Tonight, he became a weekend presenter for the NFL Network and has hosted several live events for Discovery networks, including Skywire Live, Skyscraper Live, Chopper Live, Gold Rush Live, and Klondike Live. He began co-hosting Velocity's live broadcast of the Barrett-Jackson Auto Auctions in 2014. The final season of the series Overhaulin' finished airing in November 2015.

In June 2015, production began on Long Lost Family, which debuted on TLC on March 6, 2016. Jacobs hosted the show along with Lisa Joyner until its end in 2019.

In January 2019, Jacobs became a spokesperson for wrench.com, a tech startup focusing on bringing mobile mechanics direct to the customer.

In February 2022, Jacobs was announced as the newest member of the Mecum collector car auction's broadcast team on MotorTrend.

=== Personal life ===
Jacobs was adopted at the age of 14 months. In 1993, at the age of 22 years, he was reunited with his birth mother, Mary Hagberg, through an adoption location service with the support of his adoptive parents. He attended New Trier High School in Winnetka, Illinois and then Cranbrook School in Bloomfield Hills, Michigan before moving to California in 1988 where he attended Whittier College, earning a bachelor's degree in English. He also attended and graduated from Western State University College of Law and was later admitted to the state bar of California in 1995, although he has been inactive since 1999.
