= Sandro Demaio =

Australian medical doctor, public health expert

Alessandro "Sandro" Demaio is an Australian medical doctor, public health expert and advocate, author, TV presenter and executive, with a focus on non-communicable diseases.

== Education ==
Sandro Demaio holds a Master’s degree in public health, a PhD in non-communicable diseases, and has held fellowships at Harvard Medical School, Copenhagen School of Global Health, Johns Hopkins Bloomberg School of Public Health and the University of Melbourne.

== Career ==
Sandro started as a medical doctor at the Alfred Hospital in Australia.

Sandro was an Assistant Professor and Course Director at the University of Copenhagen's School of Global Health. He founded the PLOS Global Health Blog.

In 2012, Sandro co-founded NCDFREE, a global social movement against non-communicable diseases.

Between 2012 and 2016, Sandro was a regular columnist with The Conversation and Huffington Post.

In 2015, he founded festival21. The festival was held annually from 2015 to 2019 in Melbourne.

From 2015 to 2018, Sandro has worked as Medical Officer for Non-communicable Conditions and Nutrition in the Department of Nutrition for Health and Development at the World Health Organization in Geneva.

In 2018, Sandro established The Sandro Demaio Foundation, a not-for-profit to drive and support public health projects across Australia. Also, in 2018, Sandro became CEO of EAT Foundation, the science-based global platform for food systems transformation, and authored the cookbook "Doctor's Diet."

In 2019, Demaio became the CEO of the Victorian Health Promotion Foundation.

From 2017 to 2019, Dr Demaio co-hosted the ABC and Netflix television show Ask the Doctor, an exploratory factual medical series broadcasting across Australia and worldwide.

He is also a regular contributor to ABC, ABC Radio Melbourne and Radio National. He appears on podcasts and has published more than 35 scientific papers and 110 articles for The British Journal of Sports Medicine, The Lancet and Medical Journal of Australia. Demaio also launched a podcast, "In Good Health,".

In 2023, Sandro Demaio contributed to and starred in the ABC TV Show Magda’s Big National Health Check with Magda Szubanski.
