= Paramedics (Australian TV series) =

Australian television series

- Genre: Factual television
- Narrated by: Samuel Johnson
- Country of origin: Australia
- Original language: English
- No. of seasons: 6
- No. of episodes: 75

Production
- Production locations: Melbourne, Victoria (2018–2022); Adelaide, South Australia (2024–2025); Perth, Western Australia (2026)
- Running time: 60 minutes (including commercials)
- Production company: WTFN

Original release
- Network: Nine Network
- Release: 4 October 2018 – present

Related
- Emergency

Paramedics is an Australian factual television series that looks at the everyday working of paramedics in Victoria, South Australia, and Western Australia. It is narrated by Australian actor, Samuel Johnson.

The show premiered on 4 October 2018, and showcased the everyday workings of Paramedics operating in road ambulances, helicopters, single responder intensive/critical care vehicles and motorcycles.

The first four seasons were filmed in Victoria with Ambulance Victoria, while Season 5 shifted to Adelaide, South Australia, featuring SA Ambulance. Filming for Season 7 begun in April 2025 and will follow the work of St John WA Paramedics in Western Australia. The seventh season will premiere on 8 October 2026.

== Episodes ==
Series	Episodes	Originally released	
Series	Episodes	First released	Last released
1	10	4 October 2018	6 December 2018
2	20	11 February 2020	21 July 2020
3	12	11 August 2021	21 October 2021
4	10	29 September 2022	8 December 2022
5	13	15 April 2024	28 August 2024
6	10	15 July 2025	30 September 2025

=== Season 1 (2018) ===
No. overall	No. in series	Title	Original release date	Viewers (millions)
1	1	"Episode 1"	4 October 2018	633,000
Every second counts as Taz and Amanda treat a swimmer who collapses after leaving a sauna – they must act quickly to prevent a cardiac arrest. Jamie and Mike deliver friendly first-aid to a colourful character having a tough time. Natalie and Leonard find a novel way to lift an elderly patient’s spirits. Matt and his helicopter crew take flight to help a two-year-old girl who’s fallen unconscious and stopped breathing.
2	2	"Episode 2"	11 October 2018	684,000
Mark and Carina race to help a critically injured paraglider who’s crashed into a cliff but challenging terrain hinders progress as night closes in. Jamie and Mike struggle to convince a cyclist hit by a car to go to hospital, fearing her adrenaline is masking multiple injuries. A bed bugs case has Nicola and Michelle getting itchy all over, while Taz and Amanda rush to aid a man who’s collapsed in agony at his workplace.
3	3	"Episode 3"	18 October 2018	717,000
Mark and Carina race to save a young woman struggling to breathe from a severe asthma attack. Matt airlifts a trauma patient to hospital after a horror car crash. Taz and Amanda find a fun way of deciding who drives the ambulance.
4	4	"Episode 4"	25 October 2018	662,000
Nat and Leonard get a surprise while treating a suspected drug overdose, who was later found to be wanted by police after breaching bail conditions. A heartbreaking fall for a 98-year-old woman requires a delicate rescue mission.
5	5	"Episode 5"	1 November 2018	639,000
Nat and Leonard battle to save an elderly woman after a suspected stroke. Taz and Amanda race to help a child trapped in a car outside a kindergarten, all while the on-board GPS led them astray, and later found a family dog is also in the car.
6	6	"Episode 6"	8 November 2018	627,000
Matt treats a patient burnt in a work-place explosion, but bad weather jeopardises the flight to hospital. Nat presses Leonard to propose marriage. Mark struggles with a misbehaving driver who’s crashed into a pole.
7	7	"Episode 7"	15 November 2018	651,000
Mark is called to a volatile emergency as a man leaps from a moving car and goes on a rampage. Flight paramedic Ray races to a camping trip SOS. Amanda and Leonard treat a badly injured tourist after an ill-fated skateboarding attempt.
8	8	"Episode 8"	22 November 2018	785,000
Every second counts as paramedics try to reach an unconscious patient by breaking into her house. Mark and Carina treat a man with a life-threatening condition, where the only way to save him is to stop his heart.
9	9	"Episode 9"	29 November 2018	861,000
A mysterious young woman found unresponsive on a bus has Carina baffled. Matt becomes concerned after a frightened car crash survivor loses her memory. Risky and Nicola are confronted by an unwanted intruder.
10	10	"Episode 10"	6 December 2018	848,000
Mark races to help a young father in danger of losing his arm, following a horrific workplace accident. After a car crash leaves a trail of destruction creating chaos, Nat and Leonard are shocked by a patient’s surprising revelation.

=== Season 2 (2020) ===
No. overall	No. in series	Title	Original release date	Viewers (millions)
11	1	"Episode 1"	11 February 2020	741,000
The series, produced with the help of Ambulance Victoria, features unrivalled access to paramedics, with vision captured from up to 60 cameras rigged in ambulances, helicopters, and on motorbikes.
12	2	"Episode 2"	18 February 2020	696,000
A shocking motorcycle accident leaves a family man in critical condition. Can surgery in the back of an ambulance keep him alive? Cam races to help a baby arriving in a hurry. Amanda and Taz help a little patient who's had a big fall.
13	3	"Episode 3"	25 February 2020	691,000
Matt attempts a difficult rescue of an injured paraglider. A horse trainer is critical after being kicked in the head. An aggressive patient at a train station puts Taz and Amanda to the test. A hit-and-run endangers a baby.
14	4	"Episode 4"	3 March 2020	666,000
A mother is badly injured in a car crash and is desperate to find her baby girl. A shop assistant mysteriously collapses. Will expectant parents meet their baby in the back of the ambulance before Mike or Eamon can get them to hospital?
15	5	"Episode 5"	10 March 2020	642,000
Carina and Doddsy battle traffic to save a child. Taz and Amanda have a hair-raising encounter with a dog bite victim. Cullen responds to a devastating road accident. Glenice takes a coastal trek to reach the victim of a selfie gone wrong.
16	6	"Episode 6"	1 April 2020	694,000
Leonard and Nat are called to a road accident that leaves a driver trapped, showing signs of amnesia. A mountain bike crash results in shocking facial injuries. Eamon and Mike play referee to an allergy patient and his mum. Note: This episode was scheduled to air on 17 March 2020, however was delayed to 1 April 2020 due to a special Nine News bulletin on the Coronavirus disease 2019.
17	7	"Episode 7"	8 April 2020	595,000
Can Cam's detective skills crack a critical case? Nicola and Risky are baffled by a woman's bizarre symptoms. A laid back patient with a major problem has Leonard and Amanda on tenterhooks and Ray helps the victim of a high-speed car crash.
18	8	"Episode 8"	15 April 2020	595,000
Cam answers a dangerous callout to save a patient in crisis. What surprise does Amanda have in store to celebrate Taz's ten years in the service? Mike and Eamon's concerns grow for a newlywed couple who've come off their motorbike.
19	9	"Episode 9"	22 April 2020	544,000
A bumpy ride for Amanda and Taz as they rush to a foster mum in agony. Flight paramedic Matt races to help a student who is critically injured in a school sporting accident. Eamon works his charms on a distressed cyclist.
20	10	"Episode 10"	29 April 2020	542,000
A gripping emergency airlift for a woman who's suffered a massive stroke. A patient refuses to go to hospital without his beloved dog, and a fun day at a water park turns into a nightmare.
21	11	"Episode 11"	6 May 2020	521,000
Mike and Eamon treat a car accident victim who's also been brutally stabbed. Nat and Leonard help a golfer who's feeling sub-par. And Glenice meets a hero dog who raises the alarm when his owner is thrown from her horse.
22	12	"Episode 12"	13 May 2020	550,000
Australia's ambulance crews fight to save lives in this gripping factual series. Cameras capture unguarded moments of compassion, love and laughter, giving unprecedented insight into the daily lives of these emergency service heroes.
23	13	"Episode 13"	20 May 2020	553,000
Australia's ambulance crews fight to save lives in this gripping factual series. Cameras capture unguarded moments of compassion, love and laughter, giving unprecedented insight into the daily lives of these emergency service heroes.
24	14	"Episode 14"	27 May 2020	531,000
Glenice rushes to the rescue of a scared elderly man who's been trapped in his bathtub for days. Cam is called out to help a tiny patient in big trouble. A grave situation for Taz and Amanda, and Nat wins herself an admirer.
25	15	"Episode 15"	3 June 2020	590,000
A retired cowboy gets back in the ring with disastrous results, Glenice helps a young couple fighting to save their 6-year-old daughter who's suffering from a shocking disease, and Amanda and Taz get a lesson on making a marriage last.
26	16	"Episode 16"	10 June 2020	488,000
Carina and Doddsy rush to a car crash where a young man's life hangs in the balance. Amanda and Leonard help a scared Mum who has found her 11-year-old daughter lifeless on the floor, and is Leonard's baby about to make an early entrance?
27	17	"Episode 17"	16 June 2020	470,000
Cullen fights to save a man who's choking to death. Will Mike and Eamon need to break down doors to get to a possible stroke patient? Carina and Doddsy are called to help one of their own, after a young paramedic is attacked on the job.
28	18	"Episode 18"	23 June 2020	522,000
Cam worries his patient might give birth to twins in the back of the ambulance while Mike and Eamon's patient has a scare at early stages of her pregnancy. A puzzling case for Nat and Leonard and big dreams for a budding little paramedic.
29	19	"Episode 19"	30 June 2020	593,000
Flight paramedic Ray joins a massive rescue mission in treacherous conditions near Victoria's Twelve Apostles. Amanda finds an admirer in a patient with a colourful past. Can Glenice save the victim of a horror car crash?
30	20	"Episode 20"	21 July 2020	610,000
An agitated burns victim puts Ray and the helicopter crew to the test. A baby's allergic reaction has Mike and Eamon working their charm on both bub and an anxious Mum, and a critically ill bus driver makes the toughest journey of his life.

=== Season 3 (2021) ===
No. overall	No. in series	Title	Original release date	Viewers (millions)
31	1	"Episode 1"	11 August 2021	485,000
Australia's ambulance crews are there for everyday people having their worst days. Natalie and Leonard comfort a school boy who's fallen metres out of a tree.
32	2	"Episode 2"	18 August 2021	522,000
Nat and Leonard head to a hotel pool, after a romantic escape ends in disaster for a young mum. Eamon and Mike treat a traumatised child attacked by a dog.
33	3	"Episode 3"	25 August 2021	508,000
In rugged bushland, a car has crashed one hundred metres down a ravine. Rescuing the injured driver turns into a nightmare for flight paramedic Ray.
34	4	"Episode 4"	1 September 2021	561,000
A little girl's terrifying seizure has Glenice on high alert. Marlie and Tanie treat a skateboard rider who has crashed at high speed without a helmet.
35	5	"Episode 5"	8 September 2021	526,000
Simon and Michaela perform a high risk intervention on a seizure patient. Cullen races to a man with horrific injuries from a horrific crash.
36	6	"Episode 6"	15 September 2021	519,000
Cullen faces every parent's nightmare as a six-year-old child is hit by a car. Simon and Michaela battle to help a man whose pacemaker is misfiring.
37	7	"Episode 7"	22 September 2021	337,000
A 38-year-old man has suffered a massive attack while enjoying a day off with his wife in their spa. A teen footballer has collapsed after a bruising tackle. Note: This episode did not air on this night in Victoria, and aired at a later date.
38	8	"Episode 8"	29 September 2021	N/A
A 76 yr old motorbike rider suffers horrific injuries after catapulting into trees. Al and Cam race to a lung cancer survivor gasping for air. Mike joins the 'fun' ambulance.
39	9	"Episode 9"	6 October 2021	N/A
Steve and Emily are ready for anything as an office worker is hot and dizzy and down to his undies; Eamon is unimpressed with Mike's fashion sense; a former gravedigger surprises Cullen by laughing in the face of death.
40	10	"Episode 10"	TBA	TBD

=== Season 4 (2022) ===
No. overall	No. in series	Title	Original release date	Viewers (millions)
31	1	"Episode 1"	29 September 2022	N/A
Flight paramedic Steve heads to the country after a tractor topples over and crushes a farmer. Taz and Erika hope for the best as a much-loved grandma collapses.
32	2	"Episode 2"	6 October 2022	N/A
Flight paramedic Steve and the team respond to a crash, where a single-mum has gone off a bridge into water. Leonard needs all his skills to help a karate student with cardiac arrest.
33	3	"Episode 3"	13 October 2022	N/A
Cam's confronted with carnage after a motorcyclist crashes into parked cars. New partners Jodie and Nathan rush to an overheated triathlete who collapses over the finish line.
34	4	"Episode 4"	20 October 2022	N/A
Nicola and Risky find a driver who's had a seizure and crashed. Mike and Eamon get red flags treating a mother having a stroke.
35	5	"Episode 5"	27 October 2022	N/A
Flight paramedic Steve and the team respond to a horrific crash, where a single-mum has gone off a bridge and into water. MICA paramedic Leonard helps a karate student.
36	6	"Episode 6"	3 November 2022	N/A
Mike and Eamon worry a teen could have life-changing head injuries after a fall and seizure at school. Steve and Jade deliver essential care for an incredible woman.
37	7	"Episode 7"	9 November 2022	N/A
Alarm bells ring for Cam and Doddsy as a fit young man suddenly has multiple seizures. Leonard and Cullen attempt a trick-move to stop a woman's heart from racing.
38	8	"Episode 8"	17 November 2022	N/A
MICA Matt faces a grim scenario, as a dearly loved great grandfather's lung collapses. Brett and Teagan are on high alert, when a mother can't wake her child.
39	9	"Episode 9"	1 December 2022	N/A
Steve and Jade carry a fabulous range of painkillers, but their motorbike crash victim doesn't seem to want any. Teagan and Brett are called to a potential heart attack.
40	10	"Episode 10"	8 December 2022	N/A
A suburban shooting has Cam and Al battling to save a young man's life. Risky and Nicola are super-impressed with a spritely 92-year-old. Nathan and Jodie patch up a dirt bike rider.

=== Season 5 (2024) ===
No. overall	No. in series	Title	Original release date	Viewers (millions)
41	1	"Episode 1"	15 April 2024	N/A
A woman collapses with no heartbeat. Sally and Olivia fear a young boy has a head injury. Aaron and Laura help a footballer who's smashed her face with a school dance coming.
42	2	"Episode 2"	22 April 2024	N/A
Daniel rushes to a woman having a life-threatening allergic reaction from a takeaway. Sam and Chris struggle to help a partygoer after an accident in the busy nightclub district.
43	3	"Episode 3"	29 April 2024	N/A
Bill rushes to a woman whose heart is racing out of control. While Laura gives a cyclist the all-clear, Aaron happily rides the man's pushbike home.
44	4	"Episode 4"	6 May 2024	N/A
Bill rushes to a woman whose heart is racing out of control. While Laura gives a cyclist the all-clear, Aaron happily rides the man's pushbike home.
45	5	"Episode 5"	13 May 2024	N/A
Dan is in a race against time treating a woman who feels like her heart is leaping out her chest. Laura and Aaron confront a nightmare situation after a young driver crashes.
46	6	"Episode 6"	20 May 2024	N/A
Nhi and Carlos under pressure to bring an overdose patient back from the brink of death. Ben and Tarnya apply their superhero skills to a toddler struggling to breathe.
47	7	"Episode 7"	27 May 2024	N/A
A Dad suddenly suffers seizures while driving his family. Aaron and Laura treat a daredevil after a crash on his bike and Chris and Sam play "word of the day".
48	8	"Episode 8"	3 June 2024	N/A
Aaron resets a netballer's shoulder, but is he prepared for her cheeky banter? Chris teams up with Laura to help a Parkinson's patient with an infection that could turn septic.
49	9	"Episode 9"	18 June 2024	N/A
A confronting case for Nhi and Carlos as they are called to a woman running in front of traffic. Dan helps a star footballer at training. New dad Bill races to a baby in trouble.
50	10	"Episode 10"	25 June 2024	N/A
A terrified patient with a failing heart has Aaron and Laura on high alert. Chris and Sam meet their oldest ever patient. 104-year-old Nelly has face injuries after a fall.
51	11	"Episode 11"	14 August 2024	N/A
Every second counts as Bill battles to save a woman with catastrophic head injuries after she fell four metres. Laura and Aaron rush to a mum found unconscious in her car.
52	12	"Episode 12"	21 August 2024	N/A
A collapse shocks Olivia and Sally as their patient appears to be having a heart attack. Carlos and Nhi fear for their safety as a volatile woman lashes out in the ambulance.
53	13	"Episode 13"	28 August 2024	N/A
A baby could arrive before Bill gets the pregnant mother to hospital. Nhi and Carlos crash a birthday party after the guest of honour collapses in front of her terrified family.

=== Season 6 (2025) ===
No. overall	No. in series	Title	Original release date	Australian viewers (National)
54	1	"Episode 1"	15 July 2025	715,000
55	2	"Episode 2"	22 July 2025	669,000
56	3	"Episode 3"	5 August 2025	521,000
57	4	"Episode 4"	12 August 2025	465,000
58	5	"Episode 5"	19 August 2025	571,000
59	6	"Episode 6"	26 August 2025	517,000
60	7	"Episode 7"	2 September 2025	641,000
61	8	"Episode 8"	9 September 2025	594,000
62	9	"Episode 9"	23 September 2025	396,000
63	10	"Episode 10"	30 September 2025	558,000
