= Long Lost Family (Australian TV series) =

- Also known as: Long Lost Family Australia
- Genre: Documentary
- Presented by: Chrissie Swan; Anh Do
- Starring: Julia Robson (Investigator)
- Country of origin: Australia
- Original language: English
- No. of series: 1
- No. of episodes: 8

Production
- Running time: 60 minutes (inc. adverts)
- Production company: WTFN

Original release
- Network: Network Ten
- Release: 11 August 2014 – 11 May 2016

Long Lost Family Australia is an Australian television series on Network Ten which premiered on 16 March 2016 and featured eight episodes.

It is based on Dutch format Spoorloos developed by broadcaster KRO, who sold it to the UK, where it was called Long Lost Family, a BAFTA award-winning British television series that has aired on ITV since 2011. Presented by Chrissie Swan and Anh Do and featuring private investigator Julia Robson, it aimed to reunite close relatives after years of separation. It was made by the production company WTFN.

In a February 2017 interview, Ten's Chief Content Officer Beverley McGarvey confirmed there were no plans to air further seasons of the program.

== Series Summary ==
Series	Episodes	Originally released	
Series	Episodes	First released	Last released
1	8	11 August 2014	11 May 2016

=== Season 1 (2016) ===
No.	Title	Original release date	Australian viewers
1	"Episode One"	11 August 2014	564,000
In the series premiere, Anh and Chrissie tell the real and moving stories of people searching for lost family members.
2	"Episode Two"	23 March 2016	491,000
28-year-old Shane, who was adopted out at birth, yearns to find the birth mother he never knew. And Colin, 68, is on a quest to find his estranged son, who he hasn't seen for over four decades.
3	"Episode Three"	30 March 2016	502,000
Chrissie Swan & Anh Do will guide and support 42-year-old Terri King, a terminally-ill woman running out of time to find the mother who thought adoption was her daughter's only chance at a decent life
4	"Episode Four"	6 April 2016	453,000
Debbie is determined to find her father after learning that her mother is terminally ill. Plus, Trevor searches for his birth mother who gave him up for adoption when he was just a baby.
5	"Episode Five"	13 April 2016	401,000
A 76-year-old man searches for the daughter he abandoned at a tragic time of grief. Meanwhile, 69-year-old Patricia searches for the daughter she gave up when she was a teenager.
6	"Episode Six"	20 April 2016	339,000
21-year-old Tiffany searches for her half brother & sister on behalf of her mother Catherine. With only a hospital bracelet and a box of photos, 20-year-old Shantelle, searches for her older sister.
7	"Episode Seven"	4 May 2016	549,000
49-year-old Susan searches for her biological mother Brenda. Meanwhile, 45-year-old Natalieann longs to reconnect with her father Bill who she has not spoken to for 24 years.
8	"Episode Eight"	11 May 2016	464,000
47-year-old Amanda searches for her biological mother after the passing of her adoptive parents. Meanwhile, 53-year-old Jenny tries to track down her birth mother to understand why she was given up.
