= Ambulance Australia =

Australian factual television series

- Genre: Factual television
- Based on: Ambulance
- Narrated by: Lisa Wilkinson; Chris Bath
- Country of origin: Australia
- Original language: English
- No. of seasons: 5
- No. of episodes: 38 + 3 specials

Production
- Executive producers: Sarah Thornton; Tony De La Pena; Keely Sonntag
- Producers: Maria Handas; Natalie Green
- Production locations: Sydney (seasons 1, 2, 5–present); Brisbane, Queensland (seasons 3, 4)
- Camera setup: Multi-camera
- Running time: 50–75 minutes
- Production company: Endemol Shine Australia

Original release
- Network: Network 10
- Release: 16 October 2018 – present

Related
- Ambulance

Ambulance Australia is an Australian factual television program on Network 10 that follows the New South Wales, Queensland and Victoria Ambulance services from the Triple Zero Control Centres to paramedics on the road. It is based on the original UK factual series Ambulance.

The show premiered on 16 October 2018, and followed NSW Ambulance call-takers, dispatchers and paramedics as they faced high pressure situations on a daily basis. They are the first to respond to urgent and emergency calls, using their training and experience to make split second decisions that can mean the difference between life and death as they step into situations that can be emotionally fraught or physically dangerous. Filming for Season 1 occurred in mostly metropolitan areas of Sydney.

The show was renewed for a second season, which premiered on Tuesday 26 February 2019. This series focused on the summer period from December 2018 to February 2019. A special three-episode season called Ambulance Australia: Ultimate Emergencies premiered on Sunday 8 September 2019, with some of the worst emergencies of the first and second seasons.

A third season was renewed on 22 September 2019, filming with the Queensland Ambulance Service, to showcase the "Sunshine State's" paramedics and their crucial work, in the state with the highest number of responses to medical incidents every year. It premiered on 6 February 2020, a fourth season was commissioned in October 2020 and premiered on 9 February 2022.

== Episodes ==
=== Series overview ===
Series	Ambulance service	Episodes	Originally released	
Series	Ambulance service	Episodes	First released	Last released
1	New South Wales Ambulance	8	16 October 2018	4 December 2018
2	New South Wales Ambulance	8	26 February 2019	30 May 2019
Specials	New South Wales Ambulance	3	8 September 2019	22 September 2019
3	Queensland Ambulance Service	8	6 February 2020	26 March 2020
4	Queensland Ambulance Service	8	9 February 2022	6 April 2022
5	New South Wales Ambulance	8	7 February 2024	7 August 2024

=== Season 1 (2018) ===
No. overall	No. in season	Title	Original release date	Australian viewers
1	1	"Episode 1"	16 October 2018	638,000
Follow Sydney Ambulance workers from the call takers to the paramedics on the scene. Tonight paramedics rush to help a pregnant woman who has gone into labour after a car accident.
2	2	"Episode 2"	23 October 2018	734,000
A woman falls off a 15-meter cliff. A rookie paramedic faces a confronting case. A catastrophic crash threatens the life of a beloved husband. A young son is trapped seizing in a bathroom.
3	3	"Episode 3"	30 October 2018	673,000
A shortage in ambulances. Long wait times for patients heading to Liverpool Hospital. A horrific motor vehicle accident. Brain injury. A house fire. Suspected domestic violence. All this in the day-in-the-life of a paramedic.
4	4	"Episode 4"	6 November 2018	605,000
A call taker tries to revive a hanging patient over the phone when the family's given up. A heart attack turns into a race against the clock. A gruesome double stabbing pushes the limits of the team.
5	5	"Episode 5"	13 November 2018	600,000
It is not an ordinary Sunday for NSW Ambulance, as eighty thousand people hit the streets in Sydney's annual City2Surf. Paramedics drive through the crowds to locate someone in trouble. A deadly drug overdose and a drunk and enraged ice addict – all this in a day in the life of a paramedic.
6	6	"Episode 6"	20 November 2018	618,000
In this episode we see the highest possible medical intervention, while a legally blind patient with PTSD vents his frustration for the lack of hours for home care aid, while a spike in GHB and cocaine overdose cases sends late-night crew into action during a blood moon Friday night.
7	7	"Episode 7"	27 November 2018	731,000
Crews are called to a motorcycle accident in peak hour traffic, and paramedics must solve the cause of an elderly woman's excruciating pain. Call taker Laura celebrates her last shift in the control centre before leaving to become a paramedic, while a devastating car crash on the far outskirts of Sydney throws crews into overdrive as they face the tyranny of distance.
8	8	"Episode 8"	4 December 2018	734,000
Former call-taker Laura goes out on her very first shift on the road as a paramedic. Her first call-out sees her attend a man suffering chest pains at Sydney's busy airport, while veteran paramedic Carolyn faces a life or death situation when a 90-year-old woman suffers a heart attack. On a construction site, Duty Operations Manager Brian needs to rescue a worker who's fallen from a height. But getting him out of the building site into the ambulance proves to be extremely tricky.

=== Season 2 (2019) ===
No. overall	No. in season	Title	Original release date	Australian viewers
9	1	"Episode 1"	26 February 2019	441,000
The officers deal with a high volume of pregnancy-related calls in summer; emergency workers respond to a car crash on a remote dirt road.
10	2	"Episode 2"	5 March 2019	451,000
Paramedics Ali and Josh respond to an urgent stabbing and get stuck in the middle of a terrifying street brawl, and the worst hail storm tears through the city.
11	3	"Episode 3"	12 March 2019	463,000
The crews attend the scene of an explosion at a worksite, which has left three men with burns and smoke inhalation, a motor vehicle accident involving two cars, a young girl who has fallen from a horse, and a man with a sore finger. Sisters Sam and Tammie receive a surprise when a suspected deceased patient is found alive and well.
12	4	"Episode 4"	19 March 2019	476,000
This episode focuses on the Duty Operations Managers (DOMS). Mick attends a suspected terrorist incident at a consulate, newly promoted Joe goes to the scene of a factory explosion that has left one man with 40 per cent burns to his body. Brian recalls the Victoria fires as he treats firefighters at a north western Sydney bushfire.
13	5	"Episode 5"	26 March 2019	483,000
With an emergency phone call every ten seconds, it is Australia's biggest night: New Year's Eve! The ambulance service is stretched to its limits and then something terrible occurs at the worst possible time: a cardiac arrest...
14	6	"Episode 6"	2 April 2019	439,000
Ambulance Australia follows people in the business of saving lives, going beyond the flashing lights to the heart and soul of heroes.
15	7	"Episode 7"	23 May 2019	454,000
Paramedics are called to a bomb threat at Sydney Airport, while good friends Mosh and Karen are called to a 35-week pregnant woman who has not felt her baby move in 10 hours and has severe bleeding.
16	8	"Episode 8"	30 May 2019	411,000
It is one of the busiest days of the year for paramedics, Australia Day. Faced with an increase in alcohol related calls Sam and Tammy attend to a man passed out in the middle of the road in his car.

=== Season 3 (2020) ===
No. overall	No. in season	Title	Original release date	Australian viewers
17	1	"Episode 1"	6 February 2020	481,000
A sudden car crash in front of their ambulance forces Pete and Phil to perform one of the most extraordinary resuscitations from a deadly heart attack ever captured on film. Also, call taker Jaimi talks a family through a labour while waiting for paramedics to arrive. Paramedics rush to a number of MDMA overdoses after the RiverFire Festival and Listen Out Brisbane Music Festival.
18	2	"Episode 2"	13 February 2020	525,000
Senior Operations Supervisor Brad responds to an injured driver involved in a fatal car crash as a result of speeding. In the midst of the graveyard shift, the Operations Centre springs into action when Callum receives a report of a multi-causality stabbing from a home invasion in Brisbane's North.
19	3	"Episode 3"	20 February 2020	494,000
The team face the realities of life between birth and death. A newborn baby birthed in a car, an infant needing CPR and a two-year-old boy struggling to breathe.
20	4	"Episode 4"	27 February 2020	447,000
When a motorbike rider falls traveling at high speed, his injuries are so severe that highly trained paramedic, Aaron, must turn the side of the road into an operating theatre to save his life.
21	5	"Episode 5"	5 March 2020	547,000
A woman stranded on a remote walking track, unable to make her way out, must rely on the help of emergency services, and a devastating house fire causes a severe case of smoke inhalation.
22	6	"Episode 6"	12 March 2020	526,000
A frantic call from a witness to a serious motor vehicle accident requires concise and reassuring advice from the emergency medical dispatcher in the Operations Centre as the caller steps in to help.
23	7	"Episode 7"	19 March 2020	506,000
The importance of first aid is shown while paramedics battle the logistics of extricating a man at a train station. Things turn bizarre as paramedics help a man struck in the groin by a javelin.
24	8	"Episode 8"	26 March 2020	675,000
A fast-acting neighbour responds to panicked calls for help as emergency medical dispatcher Sarah's clear and calm advice attempts to avoid a potentially lethal incident from escalating.

=== Season 4 (2022) ===
No. overall	No. in season	Title	Original release date	Australian viewers
25	1	"Episode 1"	9 February 2022	294,000
In this season's premiere, we follow Shane and Shelly, who must help a patient in need of urgent care after an incident involving a car. The incident is classified as a code 1A, the most serious emergency.
26	2	"Episode 2"	16 February 2022	278,000
A man claims to have jumped off Brisbane's Story Bridge and we see the effects this has on the professionals who are racing to piece together a puzzle to try and save a life.
27	3	"Episode 3"	23 February 2022	N/A
The low blood sugar levels of 23-year-old type one diabetic have led to a dangerous seizure. Another code 1A comes in for two-year-old Levi, suffering serious respiratory issues.
28	4	"Episode 4"	2 March 2022	N/A
When a head-on collision leaves one driver trapped in their car, Tash, a specialist Critical Care Paramedic, is faced with a difficult decision to try and save the woman's life.

=== Season 5 (2024) ===
No. overall	No. in season	Title	Original release date	Australian viewers
33	1	"Episode 1"	7 February 2024	N/A
During this episode, paramedics are called to a 7-year-old boy gasping for air, and a serious multi motor vehicle accident where a rescue is hampered by downed power lines and a childbirth emergency.
34	2	"Episode 2"	14 February 2024	N/A
A child makes an alarming call about a 5-year-old stuck in mud, but all is not as it seems. A suspected stroke is reported at an alleged workplace, only to find a severely intoxicated man at a party.
35	3	"Episode 3"	21 February 2024	N/A
Ambulance NSW responds to an 88-year-old's severe head wound, a hair-raising motorbike accident, a life-saving CPR call, a serious burns incident and a challenging 170kg patient extraction.

=== Specials ===
No. in season	Title	Original release date	Australian viewers
1	"Ultimate Emergencies: Episode 1"	8 September 2019	277,000
2	"Ultimate Emergencies: Episode 2"	15 September 2019	301,000
3	"Ultimate Emergencies: Episode 3"	22 September 2019	278,000

== International distribution ==
In 2019, Season 1 of the series is aired on TVNZ 2 in New Zealand and TVNZ On Demand, the same week as Australia airing the week after the corresponding episode in season 2. On 13 February 2020, New Zealand began airing the second season of the show. Seasons 1 and 2 of the series are available for streaming through Amazon Prime and on BBC iPlayer in the United Kingdom.
