= Dancing with the Stars (Australian TV series) season 18 =

Dancing with the Stars
- Season 18
- Hosted by: Daryl Somers; Sonia Kruger
- Judges: Todd McKenney; Paul Mercurio; Helen Richey; Mark Wilson
- Celebrity winner: Luke Jacobz
- Professional winner: Jorja Freeman

Release
- Original network: Seven Network
- Original release: 11 April – 25 April 2021

Season chronology
- ← Previous; Season 17 Next → Season 19

The eighteenth season of the Australian Dancing with the Stars, also known as Dancing with the Stars: All Stars, debuted on 11 April 2021.

Following the conclusion of the seventeenth season, it was announced that the show would not return for another season on Network 10. However, in December 2020, Seven announced that the channel had regained the rights to the series, and would be bringing the show back with an All-Stars edition in 2021. For the first time in the show's history, the series was pre-recorded at the ICC in Sydney in March 2021 instead of aired live. The series also aired nightly instead of weekly.

Daryl Somers and Sonia Kruger, who hosted the show from its inception in 2004, until 2007 and 2011 respectively, replaced Grant Denyer and Amanda Keller as hosts. Meanwhile, original judges Todd McKenney, Paul Mercurio, Helen Richey, and Mark Wilson replaced Sharna Burgess, Craig Revel Horwood, and Tristan MacManus on the judging panel.

== Couples ==
The line-up was announced on 16 March 2021, consisting of ten former contestants, including five former winners, as well as four wild card contestants who hadn't previously competed on the show.

Celebrity	Notability	Professional partner	Status
Fifi Box Season 6	Radio broadcaster	Jeremy Garner	Eliminated 1st on 11 April 2021
Erin McNaught Season 12	Model	Julian Caillon	Eliminated 2nd on 12 April 2021
Schapelle Corby	Drug smuggler	Shae Mountain	Eliminated 3rd on 13 April 2021
Jessica Gomes	Model	Lyu Masuda	Eliminated 4th on 18 April 2021
Matty Johnson	The Bachelor Australia star	Ruby Gherbaz	Eliminated 5th & 6th on 19 April 2021
Tom Williams Season 2	TV presenter	Alexandra Vladimirov	Eliminated 5th & 6th on 19 April 2021
Jamie Durie Season 6	Horticulturist	Siobhan Power	Eliminated 8th & 9th on 20 April 2021
Renee Bargh	TV presenter	Jarryd Byrne	Eliminated 8th & 9th on 20 April 2021
Ada Nicodemou Season 3	Actress	Aric Yegudkin	Finalists on 25 April 2021
Kyly Clarke Season 14	Model	Gustavo Viglio	Finalists on 25 April 2021
Lincoln Lewis Season 9	Film & television actor	Lily Cornish	Finalists on 25 April 2021
Manu Feildel Season 11	Chef	Katrina Patchett	Finalists on 25 April 2021
Bec Hewitt Season 1	Actress	Craig Monley	Runners-up on 25 April 2021
Luke Jacobz Season 8	Actor & television presenter	Jorja Freeman	Winners on 25 April 2021

== Scoring chart ==
The highest score each week is indicated in bold green with a dagger (†), while the lowest score each week is indicated in italicized red with a double-dagger (‡).

Color key:

Winners
Runners-up
Finalists
Bottom two or three
Eliminated

Dancing with the Stars (season 18) - Weekly scores
Couple	Pl.	Night						
Couple	Pl.	1	2	3	4	5	6	7
Luke & Jorja	1st	—N/a	31	—N/a	**38**†	—N/a	40+10=**50**†	**40**† (Note: This couple finished in first place.)
Bec & Craig	2nd	31	—N/a	31	—N/a	39+10=**49**†	—N/a	**40**† (Note: This couple finished in second place.)
Lincoln & Lily	3rd	29	—N/a	29	—N/a	36+9=45	—N/a	38 (Note: This couple competed in the Finals.)
Ada & Aric	3rd	—N/a	30	—N/a	37	—N/a	37+9=46	37
Kyly & Gustavo	3rd	**33**†	—N/a	**37**†	—N/a	38+8=46 (Note: This couple was in the bottom two or bottom three, but was not eliminated.)	—N/a	37
Manu & Katrina	3rd	—N/a	23‡	—N/a	33	—N/a	29+7=36‡	32‡
Jamie & Siobhan	7th	—N/a	28	—N/a	29	—N/a	31+6=37 (Note: This couple was eliminated.)	
Renee & Jarryd	7th	—N/a	**36**†	—N/a	35	—N/a	34+8=42	
Matty J & Ruby	9th	23	—N/a	26	—N/a	31+6=37		
Tom & Alexandra	9th	28	—N/a	27	—N/a	28+7=35‡		
Jessica & Lyu	11th	—N/a	28	—N/a	19‡			
Schapelle & Shae	12th	26	—N/a	20‡				
Erin & Julian	13th	—N/a	26					
Fifi & Jeremy	14th	22‡						

== Nightly scores ==
Unless indicated otherwise, individual judges scores in the charts below (given in parentheses) are listed in this order from left to right: Todd McKenney, Helen Richey, Paul Mercurio, Mark Wilson.

=== Night 1 ===
Couples are listed in the order they performed.

Couple	Scores	Dance	Music	Result
Tom & Alexandra	28 (7, 7, 7, 7)	Tango	"Love Runs Out" — OneRepublic	Safe
Bec & Craig	31 (7, 8, 8, 8)	Foxtrot	"Titanium" — Madilyn Paige	Safe
Lincoln & Lily	29 (7, 7, 7, 8)	Quickstep	"Hit the Road Jack" — Throttle	Safe
Kyly & Gustavo	33 (8, 8, 8, 9)	Jive	"Candyman" — Christina Aguilera	Safe
Matty J & Ruby	23 (6, 5, 6, 6)	Cha-cha-cha	"Shut Up and Dance" — Walk the Moon	Bottom two
Fifi & Jeremy	22 (5, 5, 6, 6)	Cha-cha-cha	"Murder on the Dancefloor" — Sophie Ellis-Bextor	Eliminated
Schapelle & Shae	26 (6, 6, 7, 7)	Viennese waltz	"At Last" — Etta James	Safe

=== Night 2 ===
A three-way tie occurred between Erin & Julian, Jamie & Siobhan, and Jessica & Lyu. The judges first saved Jessica & Lyu. The judges then chose to save Jamie & Siobhan based on their judges' scores, eliminating Erin & Julian.

Couples are listed in the order they performed.

Couple	Scores	Dance	Music	Result
Ada & Aric	30 (7, 8, 7, 8)	Cha-cha-cha	"Domino" — Jessie J	Safe
Luke & Jorja	31 (8, 8, 7, 8)	Tango	"Feel So Close" — Calvin Harris	Safe
Erin & Julian	26 (6, 7, 8, 5)	Viennese waltz	"You Don't Own Me" — Grace, feat. G-Eazy	Eliminated
Renee & Jarryd	36 (9, 9, 9, 9)	Cha-cha-cha	"Rain on Me" — Lady Gaga & Ariana Grande	Safe
Jamie & Siobhan	28 (7, 7, 7, 7)	Foxtrot	"Stand by Me" — Ben E. King	Bottom three
Jessica & Lyu	28 (6, 6, 8, 8)	Viennese waltz	"Stuck with U" — Ariana Grande & Justin Bieber	Bottom three
Manu & Katrina	23 (6, 6, 5, 6)	Foxtrot	"Isn't She Lovely" — Stevie Wonder	Safe

=== Night 3 ===
Couples are listed in the order they performed.

Couple	Scores	Dance	Music	Result
Bec & Craig	31 (7, 8, 8, 8)	Jive	"Saturday Night's Alright for Fighting" — Elton John	Safe
Lincoln & Lily	29 (7, 7, 8, 7)	Tango	"There's Nothing Holdin' Me Back" — Shawn Mendes	Safe
Kyly & Gustavo	37 (9, 9, 9, 10)	Foxtrot	"Haven't Met You Yet" — Michael Bublé	Safe
Matty J & Ruby	26 (6, 6, 7, 7)	Viennese waltz	"Like I'm Gonna Lose You" — Meghan Trainor, feat. John Legend	Bottom two
Schapelle & Shae	20 (4, 5, 6, 5)	Charleston	"Crazy in Love" — Swing Republic, feat. Karina Kappel	Eliminated
Tom & Alexandra	27 (6, 7, 7, 7)	Foxtrot	"Ordinary People" — John Legend	Safe

Judges' votes to save

- Wilson: Matty J & Ruby
- Mercurio: Matty J & Ruby
- Richey: Matty J & Ruby
- McKenney: Did not vote, but would have voted to save Schapelle & Shae

=== Night 4 ===
Couples are listed in the order they performed.

Couple	Scores	Dance	Music	Result
Manu & Katrina	33 (9, 8, 8, 8)	Salsa	"Last Dance" — Donna Summer	Safe
Renee & Jarryd	35 (9, 9, 9, 8)	Tango	"Applause" — Lady Gaga	Safe
Luke & Jorja	38 (8, 10, 10, 10)	Rumba	"Last Request" — Paolo Nutini	Safe
Jessica & Lyu	19 (3, 5, 5, 6)	Jive	"Joker & the Thief" — Wolfmother	Eliminated
Jamie & Siobhan	29 (8, 7, 7, 7)	Cha-cha-cha	"Need You Tonight" — INXS	Bottom two
Ada & Aric	37 (9, 9, 9, 10)	Jive	"Jump, Jive an' Wail" — Louis Prima	Safe

Judges' votes to save

- Wilson: Jamie & Siobhan
- Mercurio: Jamie & Siobhan
- Richey: Jamie & Siobhan

=== Night 5 ===
Couples are listed in the order they performed.

Couple	Scores	Dance	Music	Result
Lincoln & Lily	36 (8, 9, 9, 10)	Jive	"Johnny B. Goode" — Chuck Berry	Safe
Kyly & Gustavo	38 (8, 10, 10, 10)	Contemporary	"Read All About It" — Emeli Sande	Bottom three
Tom & Alexandra	28 (6, 7, 7, 8)	Cha-cha-cha	"You Can Leave Your Hat On" — Joe Cocker & "Kiss" — Tom Jones	Eliminated
Matty J & Ruby	31 (8, 7, 8, 8)	Samba	"Jump in the Line (Shake, Senora)" — Harry Belafonte	Eliminated
Bec & Craig	39 (9, 10, 10, 10)	Cha-cha-cha	"Let's Get Loud" — Jennifer Lopez	Safe
Bec & Craig	10	Lindy Hop; Marathon	"Sing, Sing, Sing" — Benny Goodman & "Do Your Thing" — Basement Jaxx	
Lincoln & Lily	9	Lindy Hop; Marathon	"Sing, Sing, Sing" — Benny Goodman & "Do Your Thing" — Basement Jaxx	
Kyly & Gustavo	8	Lindy Hop; Marathon	"Sing, Sing, Sing" — Benny Goodman & "Do Your Thing" — Basement Jaxx	
Tom & Alex	7	Lindy Hop; Marathon	"Sing, Sing, Sing" — Benny Goodman & "Do Your Thing" — Basement Jaxx	
Matty J & Ruby	6	Lindy Hop; Marathon	"Sing, Sing, Sing" — Benny Goodman & "Do Your Thing" — Basement Jaxx	

Judges' votes to save

- Wilson: Kyly & Gustavo
- Mercurio: Kyly & Gustavo
- Richey: Kyly & Gustavo
- McKenney: Did not vote, but would have voted to save Matty J & Ruby

=== Night 6 ===
Couples are listed in the order they performed.

Couple	Scores	Dance	Music	Result
Manu & Katrina	29 (7, 7, 7, 8)	Tango	"Missionary Man" — Eurythmics	Bottom three
Ada & Aric	37 (9, 9, 10, 9)	Waltz	"Kissing You" — Des'ree	Safe
Jamie & Siobhan	31 (7, 8, 8, 8)	Argentine tango	"Por una Cabeza" — The Tango Project	Eliminated
Renee & Jarryd	34 (8, 9, 8, 9)	Rumba	"You Say" — Lauren Daigle	Eliminated
Luke & Jorja	40 (10, 10, 10, 10)	Paso doble	"In the Air Tonight" — Phil Collins	Safe
Luke & Jorja	10	Disco; Marathon	"Gimme! Gimme! Gimme! (A Man After Midnight)" — ABBA, "Shake Your Groove Thing" — Peaches & Herb & "Born to Be Alive" — Patrick Hernandez	
Ada & Aric	9	Disco; Marathon	"Gimme! Gimme! Gimme! (A Man After Midnight)" — ABBA, "Shake Your Groove Thing" — Peaches & Herb & "Born to Be Alive" — Patrick Hernandez	
Renee & Jarryd	8	Disco; Marathon	"Gimme! Gimme! Gimme! (A Man After Midnight)" — ABBA, "Shake Your Groove Thing" — Peaches & Herb & "Born to Be Alive" — Patrick Hernandez	
Manu & Katrina	7	Disco; Marathon	"Gimme! Gimme! Gimme! (A Man After Midnight)" — ABBA, "Shake Your Groove Thing" — Peaches & Herb & "Born to Be Alive" — Patrick Hernandez	
Jamie & Siobhan	6	Disco; Marathon	"Gimme! Gimme! Gimme! (A Man After Midnight)" — ABBA, "Shake Your Groove Thing" — Peaches & Herb & "Born to Be Alive" — Patrick Hernandez	

Judges' votes to save

- Wilson: Manu & Katrina
- Mercurio: Jamie & Siobhan
- Richey: Renee & Jarryd
- McKenney: Manu & Katrina

=== Night 7: The Winner Announced ===
Couples are listed in the order they performed.

Couple	Scores	Dance	Music	Result
Lincoln & Lily	38 (9, 9, 10, 10)	Freestyle	"Seven Nation Army" — The White Stripes	Finalists
Bec & Craig	40 (10, 10, 10, 10)	Freestyle	"Lovely" — Billie Eilish	Runners-up
Ada & Aric	37 (9, 10, 9, 9)	Freestyle	"You Can't Stop the Beat" — Nikki Blonsky	Finalists
Kyly & Gustavo	37 (9, 10, 9, 9)	Freestyle	"Toxic" — Britney Spears	Finalists
Manu & Katrina	32 (8, 8, 8, 8)	Freestyle	"Pump Up the Jam" — Technotronic	Finalists
Luke & Jorja	40 (10, 10, 10, 10)	Freestyle	"Natural" — Imagine Dragons	Winners

== Dance chart ==
- Night 1: One unlearned dance
- Night 2: One unlearned dance
- Night 3: One unlearned dance
- Night 4: One unlearned dance
- Night 5: One unlearned dance & Lindy Hop marathon
- Night 6: One unlearned dance & disco marathon
- Night 7: Freestyle

Dancing with the Stars (season 18) - Dance chart
Couple	Night								
Couple	1	2	3	4	5		6		7
Luke & Jorja	—N/a	Tango	—N/a	Rumba	—N/a	—N/a	Paso doble	Disco; Marathon	Freestyle
Bec & Craig	Foxtrot	—N/a	Jive	—N/a	Cha-cha-cha	Lindy Hop; Marathon	—N/a	—N/a	Freestyle
Ada & Aric	—N/a	Cha-cha-cha	—N/a	Jive	—N/a	—N/a	Waltz	Disco; Marathon	Freestyle
Kyly & Gustavo	Jive	—N/a	Foxtrot	—N/a	Contemp.	Lindy Hop; Marathon	—N/a	—N/a	Freestyle
Lincoln & Lily	Quickstep	—N/a	Tango	—N/a	Jive	Lindy Hop; Marathon	—N/a	—N/a	Freestyle
Manu & Katrina	—N/a	Foxtrot	—N/a	Salsa	—N/a	—N/a	Tango	Disco; Marathon	Freestyle
Jamie & Siobhan	—N/a	Foxtrot	—N/a	Cha-cha-cha	—N/a	—N/a	Argentine tango	Disco; Marathon	
Renee & Jarryd	—N/a	Cha-cha-cha	—N/a	Tango	—N/a	—N/a	Rumba	Disco; Marathon	
Matty J & Ruby	Cha-cha-cha	—N/a	Viennese waltz	—N/a	Samba	Lindy Hop; Marathon			
Tom & Alexandra	Tango	—N/a	Foxtrot	—N/a	Cha-cha-cha	Lindy Hop; Marathon			
Jessica & Lyu	—N/a	Viennese waltz	—N/a	Jive					
Schapelle & Shae	Viennese waltz	—N/a	Charleston						
Erin & Julian	—N/a	Viennese waltz							
Fifi & Jeremy	Cha-cha-cha								

== Ratings ==
Episode		Original airdate	Timeslot	Viewers (in millions)	Rank (Night)	Source
1	"Night One"	11 April 2021	Sunday 7:00 pm	0.744	5	
2	"Night Two"	12 April 2021	Monday 7:30 pm	0.558	9	
3	"Night Three"	13 April 2021	Tuesday 7:30 pm	0.588	10	
4	"Night Four"	18 April 2021	Sunday 7:00 pm	0.621	7	
5	"Night Five"	19 April 2021	Monday 7:30 pm	0.644	9	
6	"Night Six"	20 April 2021	Tuesday 7:30 pm	0.577	9	
7	"Night Seven"	25 April 2021	Sunday 7:00 pm	0.802	4	
7	"Night Seven: The Winner Announced"	25 April 2021	Sunday 7:00 pm	0.827	3	
