= Dancing with the Stars (Australian TV series) season 19 =

Dancing with the Stars
- Season 19
- Hosted by: Daryl Somers; Sonia Kruger
- Judges: Todd McKenney; Paul Mercurio; Helen Richey; Mark Wilson
- Celebrity winner: Grant Denyer
- Professional winner: Lily Cornish
- No. of episodes: 7

Release
- Original network: Seven Network
- Original release: 20 February – 3 April 2022

Season chronology
- ← Previous; Season 18 Next → Season 20

The nineteenth season of Dancing with the Stars, also known as Dancing with the Stars: All Stars 2, premiered on Seven on 20 February 2022.

Following the success of the first All-Stars season, it was announced that the show would return for another season, also featuring former contestants as well as wildcards. The series was again pre-recorded and was filmed at the ICC in Sydney.

Daryl Somers and Sonia Kruger returned as hosts, whilst Todd McKenney, Helen Richey, Paul Mercurio and Mark Wilson returned to the judging panel.

== Couples ==
The line-up was announced on 19 September 2021, consisting of ten former contestants, including four former winners. As well as four wildcard contestants who hadn't previously competed in the show. The line-up also featured Grant Denyer, who won the fourth season and went on host the Channel 10 iteration of the show which lasted two seasons (sixteenth and seventeenth seasons).

Celebrity	Notability	Professional partner	Status
Cameron Daddo	Actor	Megan Wragg	Eliminated 1st on 20 February 2022
Angie Kent Season 17	Reality personality	Julian Caillon	Eliminated 2nd on 27 February 2022
Bridie Carter Season 7	Actress	Craig Monley	Eliminated 3rd on 6 March 2022
Sam Mac	Television presenter	Ruby Gherbaz	Eliminated 4th on 13 March 2022
Anthony Koutoufides Season 5	AFL player	Jessica Raffa	Eliminated 5th & 6th on 20 March 2022
Kylie Gillies Season 9	Television presenter	Aric Yegudkin	Eliminated 5th & 6th on 20 March 2022
Olympia Valance Season 16	Actress	Gustavo Viglio	Eliminated 7th & 8th on 27 March 2022
Rob Mills Season 9	Actor	Alarna Donovan	Eliminated 7th & 8th on 27 March 2022
David Rodan Season 14	AFL player	Alexandra Vladimirov	Finalists on 3 April 2022
Deni Hines	Singer	Lyu Masuda	Finalists on 3 April 2022
Kris Smith	Model	Siobhan Power	Finalists on 3 April 2022
Ricki-Lee Coulter Season 14	Singer	Jarryd Byrne	Finalists on 3 April 2022
Courtney Act Season 16	Drag queen	Joshua Keefe	Runners-up on 3 April 2022
Grant Denyer Season 4	Television host	Lily Cornish	Winners on 3 April 2022

== Scoring chart ==
The highest score each week is indicated in bold green with a dagger (†), while the lowest score each week is indicated in italicized red with a double-dagger (‡).

Color key:

Winners
Runners-up
Finalists
Bottom two or three
Eliminated

Dancing with the Stars (season 19) - Weekly scores
Couple	Pl.	Week								
Couple	Pl.	1	2	3	4	5	6	7		
Couple	Pl.	Grant & Lily	1st	26	—	**40**†	—	39+10=**49**†	—	**40**† (Note: This couple finished in first place.)
Courtney & Josh	2nd	—	**40**†	—	**39**†	—	40+10=**50**†	**40**† (Note: This couple finished in second place.)		
David & Alexandra	3rd	—	**40**†	—	38	—	40+8=48	**40**† (Note: This couple competed in the Finals.)		
Deni & Lyu	3rd	—	39	—	33 (Note: This couple was in the bottom two or bottom three, but was not eliminated.)	—	32+4=36‡	38		
Ricki-Lee & Jarryd	3rd	**34**†	—	34	—	35+6=41	—	37		
Kris & Siobhan	3rd	19‡	—	29	—	23+4=27‡	—	34‡		
Olympia & Gustavo	7th	—	38	—	38	—	37+6=43 (Note: This couple was eliminated.)			
Rob & Alarna	7th	—	27	—	28	—	34+2=36‡			
Anthony & Jessica	9th	30	—	28‡	—	35+2=37				
Kylie & Aric	9th	29	—	**40**†	—	34+8=42				
Sam & Ruby	11th	—	22‡	—	19‡					
Bridie & Craig	12th	33	—	36						
Angie & Julian	13th	—	25							
Cameron & Megan	14th	23								

== Weekly scores ==
Unless indicated otherwise, individual judges scores in the charts below (given in parentheses) are listed in this order from left to right: Todd McKenney, Helen Richey, Paul Mercurio, Mark Wilson.

=== Week 1 ===
Couples are listed in the order they performed.

Couple	Scores	Dance	Music	Result
Grant & Lily	26 (6, 6, 7, 7)	Cha-cha-cha	"Ice Ice Baby" — Vanilla Ice	Safe
Bridie & Craig	33 (7, 9, 8, 9)	Foxtrot	"Don’t Dream It's Over" — Sixpence None the Richer	Safe
Ricki-Lee & Jarryd	34 (8, 8, 8, 10)	Cha-cha-cha	"On the Floor" — Jennifer Lopez, feat. Pitbull	Safe
Cameron & Megan	23 (5, 6, 6, 6)	Tango	"Whatever It Takes" — Imagine Dragons	Eliminated
Anthony & Jessica	30 (7, 7, 8, 8)	Viennese waltz	"What a Wonderful World" — Louis Armstrong	Safe
Kylie & Aric	29 (8, 7, 6, 8)	Cha-cha-cha	"Rescue Me" — Fontella Bass	Safe
Kris & Siobhan	19 (4, 5, 5, 5)	Viennese waltz	"Kiss from a Rose" — Seal	Bottom two

=== Week 2 ===
Couples are listed in the order they performed.

Couple	Scores	Dance	Music	Result
David & Alexandra	40 (10, 10, 10, 10)	Cha-cha-cha	"September" — Earth, Wind & Fire	Safe
Deni & Lyu	39 (10, 10, 9, 10)	Samba	"Love On Top" — Beyoncé	Safe
Olympia & Gustavo	38 (9, 9, 10, 10)	Argentine tango	"Santa Maria (del Buen Ayre)" — Gotan Project	Safe
Sam & Ruby	22 (5, 6, 5, 6)	Tango	"Someone to You" — Banners	Bottom two
Angie & Julian	25 (6, 5, 7, 7)	Cha-cha-cha	"Electricity" — Silk City & Dua Lipa	Eliminated
Courtney & Josh	40 (10, 10, 10, 10)	Jive	"Proud Mary" — Tina Turner	Safe
Rob & Alarna	27 (6, 7, 7, 7)	Cha-cha-cha	"Dynamite" — BTS	Safe

=== Week 3 ===
Couples are listed in the order they performed.

Couple	Scores	Dance	Music	Result
Grant & Lily	40 (10, 10, 10, 10)	Viennese waltz	"Don't Give Up" — Shannon Noll & Natalie Bassingthwaighte	Safe
Ricki-Lee & Jarryd	34 (9, 8, 8, 9)	Jazz	"Too Darn Hot" — Ella Fitzgerald	Safe
Kris & Siobhan	29 (7, 7, 7, 8)	Paso doble	"Devil Inside" — INXS	Safe
Kylie & Aric	40 (10, 10, 10, 10)	Viennese waltz	"Say Something" — A Great Big World & Christina Aguilera	Safe
Anthony & Jessica	28 (6, 7, 7, 8)	Jive	"Crazy Little Thing Called Love" — Queen	Bottom two
Bridie & Craig	36 (8, 9, 9, 10)	Samba	"Suit & Tie" — Justin Timberlake, feat. Jay-Z	Eliminated

Dance-off

- "Hello" — The Cat Empire

Judges' votes to save

- Wilson: Anthony & Jessica
- Mercurio: Anthony & Jessica
- Richey: Anthony & Jessica
- McKenney: Did not vote, but would have voted to save Anthony & Jessica

=== Week 4 ===
Couples are listed in the order they performed.

Couple	Scores	Dance	Music	Result
David & Alexandra	38 (10, 9, 9, 10)	Argentine tango	"Human" — Rag'n'Bone Man	Safe
Olympia & Gustavo	38 (9, 9, 10, 10)	Samba	"Levitating" — Dua Lipa	Safe
Rob & Alarna	28 (7, 8, 7, 6)	Quickstep	"What a Man Gotta Do" — Jonas Brothers	Safe
Courtney & Josh	39 (10, 10, 9, 10)	Paso doble	"Hanuman" — Rodrigo y Gabriela	Safe
Deni & Lyu	33 (9, 7, 9, 8)	Foxtrot	"Rewrite the Stars" — Zac Efron & Zendaya	Bottom two
Sam & Ruby	19 (4, 6, 5, 4)	Jive	"Hey Ya!" — Outkast	Eliminated

Dance-off

- "Hips Don't Lie" — Shakira, feat. Wyclef Jean

Judges' votes to save

- Wilson: Deni & Lyu
- Mercurio: Deni & Lyu
- Richey: Sam & Ruby
- McKenney: Deni & Lyu

=== Week 5: Semifinals: Night 1 ===
Couples are listed in the order they performed.

Couple	Scores	Dance	Music	Result
Grant & Lily	10	Rock and Roll; Marathon	"Jailhouse Rock" — Elvis Presley "Rock This Town" — Stray Cats "Great Balls of Fire" — Jerry Lee Lewis	
Kylie & Aric	8	Rock and Roll; Marathon	"Jailhouse Rock" — Elvis Presley "Rock This Town" — Stray Cats "Great Balls of Fire" — Jerry Lee Lewis	
Ricki-Lee & Jarryd	6	Rock and Roll; Marathon	"Jailhouse Rock" — Elvis Presley "Rock This Town" — Stray Cats "Great Balls of Fire" — Jerry Lee Lewis	
Kris & Siobhan	4	Rock and Roll; Marathon	"Jailhouse Rock" — Elvis Presley "Rock This Town" — Stray Cats "Great Balls of Fire" — Jerry Lee Lewis	
Anthony & Jessica	2	Rock and Roll; Marathon	"Jailhouse Rock" — Elvis Presley "Rock This Town" — Stray Cats "Great Balls of Fire" — Jerry Lee Lewis	
Kylie & Aric	34 (8, 9, 9, 8)	Samba	"Mas que Nada" — Sérgio Mendes, feat. Black Eyed Peas	Eliminated
Grant & Lily	39 (9, 10, 10, 10)	Paso doble	"Everybody Wants to Rule the World" — Lorde	Safe
Ricki-Lee & Jarryd	35 (8, 9, 9, 9)	Rumba	"I'm Not the Only One" — Sam Smith	Safe
Anthony & Jessica	35 (8, 8, 10, 9)	Quickstep	"Puttin' on the Ritz 2017 (Jazzy Radio Mix)" — Taco, feat. tomX	Eliminated
Kris & Siobhan	23 (5, 6, 6, 6)	Samba	"Mi Gente" — J Balvin & Willy William	Bottom three

Dance-off

- "You'll Be Mine (Party Time)" — Gloria Estefan

Judges' votes to save

- Wilson: Kris & Siobhan
- Mercurio: Anthony & Jessica
- Richey: Kylie & Aric
- McKenney: Kris & Siobhan

=== Week 6: Semifinals: Night 2 ===
Couples are listed in the order they performed.

Couple	Scores	Dance	Music	Result
Courtney & Josh	10	Charleston; Marathon	"Bang Bang" — will.i.am "It Don't Mean a Thing (If It Ain't Got That Swing)" — Ella Fitzgerald & Duke Ellington "A Little Party Never Killed Nobody (All We Got)" — Fergie, Q-Tip & GoonRock	
David & Alex	8	Charleston; Marathon	"Bang Bang" — will.i.am "It Don't Mean a Thing (If It Ain't Got That Swing)" — Ella Fitzgerald & Duke Ellington "A Little Party Never Killed Nobody (All We Got)" — Fergie, Q-Tip & GoonRock	
Olympia & Gustavo	6	Charleston; Marathon	"Bang Bang" — will.i.am "It Don't Mean a Thing (If It Ain't Got That Swing)" — Ella Fitzgerald & Duke Ellington "A Little Party Never Killed Nobody (All We Got)" — Fergie, Q-Tip & GoonRock	
Deni & Lyu	4	Charleston; Marathon	"Bang Bang" — will.i.am "It Don't Mean a Thing (If It Ain't Got That Swing)" — Ella Fitzgerald & Duke Ellington "A Little Party Never Killed Nobody (All We Got)" — Fergie, Q-Tip & GoonRock	
Rob & Alarna	2	Charleston; Marathon	"Bang Bang" — will.i.am "It Don't Mean a Thing (If It Ain't Got That Swing)" — Ella Fitzgerald & Duke Ellington "A Little Party Never Killed Nobody (All We Got)" — Fergie, Q-Tip & GoonRock	
Olympia & Gustavo	37 (9, 9, 10, 9)	Foxtrot	"Fever" — Peggy Lee	Eliminated
David & Alex	40 (10, 10, 10, 10)	Contemporary	"Bohemian Rhapsody" — Connie Talbot	Safe
Deni & Lyu	32 (8, 8, 8, 8)	Paso doble	"Rise" — Katy Perry	Bottom three
Courtney & Josh	40 (10, 10, 10, 10)	Foxtrot	"Let There Be Love" — Natalie Cole	Safe
Rob & Alarna	34 (8, 8, 9, 9)	Viennese waltz	"Love Songs Ain't for Us" — Amy Shark, feat. Keith Urban	Eliminated

Dance-off

- "Throw Your Hands Up (Dançar Kuduro)" — Qwote, feat. Pitbull & Lucenzo

Judges' votes to save

- Wilson: Olympia & Gustavo
- Mercurio: Olympia & Gustavo
- Richey: Deni & Lyu
- McKenney: Deni & Lyu (Since the other judges were not unanimous, Todd McKenney, as head judge, made the final decision to save Deni & Lyu.)

=== Week 7: Grand Finale ===
The judges' votes had no effect on deciding the winners; that was determined by the audience votes.

Couples are listed in the order they performed.

Couple	Scores	Dance	Music	Result
David & Alex	40 (10, 10, 10, 10)	Freestyle	"Singin' in the Rain" — Gene Kelly & "Umbrella" — Rihanna, feat. Jay-Z	Finalists
Grant & Lily	40 (10, 10, 10, 10)	Freestyle	"Uptown Funk" — Mark Ronson, feat. Bruno Mars	Winners
Ricki-Lee & Jarryd	37 (9, 9, 10, 9)	Freestyle	"Do You Love Me" — The Contours	Finalists
Deni & Lyu	38 (10, 9, 9, 10)	Freestyle	"River" — Bishop Briggs	Finalists
Courtney & Josh	40 (10, 10, 10, 10)	Freestyle	"Treat People with Kindness" — Harry Styles	Runners-up
Kris & Siobhan	34 (9, 8, 8, 9)	Freestyle	"Beggin'" — Måneskin	Finalists

== Dance chart ==
- Week 1: One unlearned dance
- Week 2: One unlearned dance
- Week 3: One unlearned dance
- Week 4: One unlearned dance
- Week 5: One unlearned dance & Rock and Roll marathon
- Week 6: One unlearned dance & Charleston marathon
- Week 7: Freestyle

Dancing with the Stars (season 19) - Dance chart
Couple	Week								
Couple	1	2	3	4	Week 5		Week 6		7
Grant & Lily	Cha-cha-cha	—	Viennese waltz	—	Paso doble	Rock and Roll; Marathon	—	—	Freestyle
Courtney & Josh	—	Jive	—	Paso doble	—	—	Foxtrot	Charleston; Marathon	Freestyle
David & Alexandra	—	Cha-cha-cha	—	Argentine tango	—	—	Contemp.	Charleston Marathon	Freestyle
Deni & Lyu	—	Samba	—	Foxtrot	—	—	Paso doble	Charleston Marathon	Freestyle
Kris & Siobhan	Viennese waltz	—	Paso doble	—	Samba	Rock and Roll Marathon	—	—	Freestyle
Ricki-Lee & Jarryd	Cha-cha-cha	—	Jazz	—	Rumba	Rock and Roll Marathon	—	—	Freestyle
Olympia & Gustavo	—	Argentine tango	—	Samba	—	—	Foxtrot	Charleston Marathon	
Rob & Alarna	—	Cha-cha-cha	—	Quickstep	—	—	Viennese waltz	Charleston Marathon	
Anthony & Jessica	Viennese waltz	—	Jive	—	Quickstep	Rock and Roll Marathon			
Kylie & Aric	Cha-cha-cha	—	Viennese Waltz	—	Samba	Rock and Roll Marathon			
Sam & Ruby	—	Tango	—	Jive					
Bridie & Craig	Foxtrot	—	Samba						
Angie & Julian	—	Cha-cha-cha							
Cameron & Megan	Tango								

== Ratings ==
Episode		Original airdate	Timeslot	Viewers	Rank	Source
1	"Week One"	20 February 2022	Sunday 7:00 pm	588,000	5	
2	"Week Two"	27 February 2022	Sunday 7:00 pm	605,000	6	
3	"Week Three"	6 March 2022	Sunday 7:00 pm	596,000	5	
4	"Week Four"	13 March 2022	Sunday 7:00 pm	517,000	6	
5	"Week Five"	20 March 2022	Sunday 7:00 pm	491,000	6	
6	"Week Six"	27 March 2022	Sunday 7:00 pm	501,000	6	
7	"Week Seven"	3 April 2022	Sunday 7:00 pm	564,000	6	
