= Dancing with the Stars (Australian TV series) season 20 =

Dancing with the Stars
- Season 20
- Hosted by: Daryl Somers; Sonia Kruger
- Judges: Sharna Burgess; Craig Revel Horwood; Todd McKenney; Mark Wilson
- Celebrity winner: Phil Burton
- Professional winner: Ash-Leigh Hunter
- No. of episodes: 7

Release
- Original network: Seven Network
- Original release: 18 June – 23 July 2023

Season chronology
- ← Previous; Season 19 Next → Season 21

The twentieth season of the Australian Dancing with the Stars premiered on 18 June 2023 on Seven.

Daryl Somers and Sonia Kruger returned as hosts, while Todd McKenney and Mark Wilson returned to the judging panel. Craig Revel Horwood and Sharna Burgess, who had both served as judges when the series aired on Network 10, replaced Helen Richey and Paul Mercurio. Richey was unavailable due to her husband recovering from surgery, while Mercurio was focused on his political career as a member of the Parliament of Victoria.

== Couples ==
This season featured fourteen celebrity contestants. The line-up was announced on 11 May 2023.

Celebrity	Notability	Professional partner	Status
Matt Preston	Food critic & television presenter	Jessica Raffa	Withdrew on 2 July 2023
Charlie Albone	Better Homes and Gardens landscaper	Ruby Gherbaz	Eliminated 1st on 9 July 2023
Gavin Wanganeen	AFL player	Megan Wragg	Eliminated 2nd on 16 July 2023
Issa Schultz	The Chase Australia star	Lily Cornish	Eliminated 3rd & 4th on 16 July 2023
James Magnussen	Olympic swimmer	Natalie Lowe	Eliminated 3rd & 4th on 16 July 2023
Sally Pearson	Olympic hurdler & 7NEWS presenter	Mitch Kirkby	Eliminated 5th on 17 July 2023
Laura Byrne	Podcaster & radio presenter	Danil Saveliev	Eliminated 6th & 7th on 17 July 2023
Pia Miranda	Film & television actress	Declan Taylor	Eliminated 6th & 7th on 17 July 2023
Christie Whelan Browne	Stage & screen actress	Craig Monley	Finalists on 23 July 2023
Mary Coustas	Comedian & actress	Aric Yegudkin	Finalists on 23 July 2023
Paulini	Singer-songwriter	Igor Ifliand	Finalists on 23 July 2023
Virginia Gay	Stage & screen actress	Ian Waite	Finalists on 23 July 2023
Emily Weir	Home and Away actress	Lyu Masuda	Runners-up on 23 July 2023
Phil Burton	Human Nature singer	Ash-Leigh Hunter	Winners on 23 July 2023

== Scoring chart ==
The highest score each week is indicated in bold green with a dagger (†), while the lowest score each week is indicated in italicized red with a double-dagger (‡).

Color key:

Winners
Runners-up
Finalists
Bottom two or four
Withdrew from competition
Eliminated

Dancing with the Stars (season 20) - Weekly scores
Couple	Pl.	Week								
Couple	Pl.	1	2	3	1+3	4	2+4	5		6
Couple	Pl.	1	2	3	1+3	4	2+4	Night 1	Night 2	6
Phil & Ash-Leigh	1st	—	29	—	—	35	64	—	39	**39**† (Note: This couple finished in first place.)
Emily & Lyu	2nd	26	—	**40**†	**66**†	—	—	**35**†	—	**39**† (Note: This couple finished in second place.)
Virginia & Ian	3rd	—	**32**†	—	—	**36**†	**68**†	—	**40**†	36 (Note: This couple competed in the Finals.)
Christie & Craig	3rd	—	30	—	—	34	64	—	37 (Note: This couple was in the bottom two or bottom four, but was not eliminated.)	36
Mary & Aric	3rd	18	—	26	44	—	—	34	—	31
Paulini & Igor	3rd	**28**†	—	30	58	—	—	25	—	30‡
Pia & Declan	7th	—	23	—	—	24	47	—	33 (Note: This couple was eliminated.)	
Laura & Danil	7th	—	19	—	—	28	47	—	19‡	
Sally & Mitch	9th	—	27	—	—	27	54	—	31	
James & Natalie	10th	27	—	26	53	—	—	26		
Issa & Lily	10th	20	—	25	45	—	—	22		
Gavin & Megan	12th	8‡	—	20	28	—	—	18‡		
Charlie & Ruby	13th	—	8‡	—	—	17‡	25‡			
Matt & Jessica	14th	10	—	6‡	16‡ (Note: This couple withdrew from the competition.)					

== Weekly scores ==
Unless indicated otherwise, individual judges scores in the charts below (given in parentheses) are listed in this order from left to right: Craig Revel Horwood, Sharna Burgess, Todd McKenney, Mark Wilson.

=== Week 1 ===
Couples are listed in the order they performed.

Couple	Scores	Dance	Music
Emily & Lyu	26 (6, 7, 6, 7)	Samba	"Can't Touch It" — Ricki-Lee Coulter
James & Natalie	27 (6, 7, 7, 7)	Tango	"Love Me Again" — John Newman
Issa & Lily	20 (3, 5, 6, 6)	Foxtrot	"Moondance" — Van Morrison
Gavin & Megan	8 (1, 3, 1, 3)	Cha-cha-cha	"Move Your Feet" — Junior Senior
Mary & Aric	18 (4, 5, 4, 5)	Tango	"Castle On The Hill" — Ed Sheeran
Paulini & Igor	28 (7, 7, 7, 7)	Samba	"Pon de Replay" — Rihanna
Matt & Jessica	10 (3, 3, 3, 1)	Foxtrot	"Ain't That A Kick In The Head" — Dean Martin

=== Week 2 ===
Couples are listed in the order they performed.

Couple	Scores	Dance	Music
Pia & Declan	23 (5, 6, 6, 6)	Cha-cha-cha	"Mercy" — Duffy
Sally & Mitch	27 (6, 7, 7, 7)	Quickstep	"It Don't Mean a Thing" — Duke Ellington
Charlie & Ruby	8 (1, 3, 2, 2)	Jive	"Blinding Lights" — The Weeknd
Christie & Craig	30 (7, 8, 7, 8)	Viennese waltz	"You Are the Reason" — Calum Scott, feat. Leona Lewis
Laura & Danil	19 (5, 5, 4, 5)	Jive	"One Way or Another (Teenage Kicks)" — One Direction
Phil & Ash-Leigh	29 (7, 7, 7, 8)	Viennese waltz	"Iris" — Goo Goo Dolls
Virginia & Ian	32 (8, 8, 8, 8)	Paso doble	"Paint It Black" — Ciara

=== Week 3 ===
Before the dance-off, Matt announced his decision to withdraw from the competition due to a knee injury sustained during training for the first show.

Couples are listed in the order they performed.

Couple	Scores	Dance	Music	Result
Mary & Aric	26 (6, 7, 6, 7)	Samba	"Freedom! '90" — George Michael	Safe
Paulini & Igor	30 (7, 8, 7, 8)	Foxtrot	"Beauty and the Beast" — Angela Lansbury	Safe
Matt & Jessica	6 (1, 3, 1, 1)	Paso doble	"Let's Stick Together" — Bryan Ferry	Withdrew
Gavin & Megan	20 (4, 5, 5, 6)	Tango	"Song 2" — Blur	Bottom two
Emily & Lyu	40 (10, 10, 10, 10)	Contemporary	"Stayin' Alive" — Bee Gees	Safe
James & Natalie	26 (6, 7, 6, 7)	Cha-cha-cha	"Head & Heart" — Joel Corry	Safe
Issa & Lily	25 (4, 7, 7, 7)	Jive	"Greased Lightnin'" — John Travolta	Safe

=== Week 4 ===
Couples are listed in the order they performed.

Couple	Scores	Dance	Music	Result
Christie & Craig	34 (8, 9, 8, 9)	Cha-cha-cha	"How Will I Know" — Whitney Houston	Safe
Pia & Declan	24 (6, 7, 5, 6)	Argentine tango	"Asi Se Baila El Tango" — from Take The Lead	Safe
Sally & Mitch	27 (7, 7, 6, 7)	Jive	"Made You Look" — Meghan Trainor	Bottom two
Charlie & Ruby	17 (3, 4, 4, 6)	Rumba	"Let It Go" — James Bay	Eliminated
Virginia & Ian	36 (9, 9, 9, 9)	Quickstep	"Happy" — C2C, feat. Derek Martin	Safe
Laura & Danil	28 (6, 8, 7, 7)	Foxtrot	"Fallin'" — Jessica Mauboy	Safe
Phil & Ash-Leigh	35 (8, 9, 9, 9)	Paso doble	"Another One Bites the Dust" — Queen	Safe

Dance-off performances

- Sally & Mitch: "At This Moment" — Billy Vera and the Beaters (Waltz)
- Charlie & Ruby: "X" — Jonas Brothers, feat. Karol G (Salsa)

Judges' votes to save

- Wilson: Sally & Mitch
- Burgess: Sally & Mitch
- Horwood: Sally & Mitch
- McKenney: Did not vote

=== Week 5 ===
Night 1

Couples are listed in the order they performed.

Couple	Scores	Dance	Music	Result
Paulini & Igor	25 (6, 6, 6, 7)	Jive	"2 Be Loved (Am I Ready)" — Lizzo	Bottom four
James & Natalie	26 (7, 7, 6, 6)	Viennese waltz	"Hold My Hand" — Lady Gaga	Eliminated by judges' votes
Issa & Lily	22 (3, 5, 7, 7)	Paso doble	"(I Can't Get No) Satisfaction" — The Rolling Stones	Eliminated by judges' votes
Gavin & Megan	18 (2, 5, 5, 6)	Rumba	"Just Give Me a Reason" — Pink, feat. Nate Ruess	Eliminated immediately
Emily & Lyu	35 (9, 9, 9, 8)	Quickstep	"Walking on Sunshine" — Katrina and the Waves	Safe
Mary & Aric	34 (8, 8, 9, 9)	Paso doble	"Bad Romance" — Lady Gaga	Safe

Dance-off performances

- Paulini & Igor: "At This Moment" — Billy Vera and the Beaters (Waltz)
- Issa & Lily: "Black Betty" — Spiderbait (Charleston)
- James & Natalie: "At This Moment" — Billy Vera and the Beaters (Waltz)

Judges' votes to save

- Wilson: Paulini & Igor
- Burgess: Paulini & Igor
- Horwood: Paulini & Igor
- McKenney: Did not vote

Night 2

Couples are listed in the order they performed.

Couple	Scores	Dance	Music	Result
Laura & Danil	19 (5, 5, 4, 5)	Cha-cha-cha	"Break Free" — Ariana Grande, feat. Zedd	Eliminated by judges' votes
Phil & Ash-Leigh	39 (9, 10, 10, 10)	Foxtrot	"The Way You Look Tonight" — Frank Sinatra	Safe
Sally & Mitch	31 (7, 8, 8, 8)	Tango	"Pompeii" — Bastille	Eliminated immediately
Virginia & Ian	40 (10, 10, 10, 10)	Foxtrot	"Feeling Good" — Nina Simone	Safe
Pia & Declan	33 (8, 8, 9, 8)	Paso doble	"I Ran (So Far Away)" — Flock of Seagulls	Eliminated by judges' votes
Christie & Craig	37 (10, 10, 7, 10)	Samba	"New Rules" — Dua Lipa	Bottom four

Dance-off performances

- Pia & Declan: "Black Betty" — Spiderbait (Charleston)
- Laura & Danil: "X" — Jonas Brothers, feat. Karol G (Salsa)
- Christie & Craig: "Black Betty" — Spiderbait (Charleston)

Judges' votes to save

- Wilson: Christie & Craig
- Burgess: Christie & Craig
- Horwood: Christie & Craig
- McKenney: Did not vote

=== Week 6: Finale ===
Couples are listed in the order they performed.

Couple	Scores	Dance	Music	Result
Emily & Lyu	39 (9, 10, 10, 10)	Freestyle	"Spice Up Your Life" — Spice Girls	Runners-up
Paulini & Igor	30 (7, 7, 8, 8)	Freestyle	"24K Magic" — Bruno Mars	Finalists
Mary & Aric	31 (7, 9, 7, 8)	Freestyle	"Rise Up" — Andra Day	Finalists
Phil & Ash-Leigh	39 (9, 10, 10, 10)	Freestyle	"Land of a Thousand Dances" — Wilson Pickett	Winners
Christie & Craig	36 (8, 10, 8, 10)	Freestyle	"Stairway to Heaven" — Led Zeppelin	Finalists
Virginia & Ian	36 (9, 9, 9, 9)	Freestyle	"A Little Party Never Killed Nobody (All We Got)" — Fergie, Q-Tip & GoonRock	Finalists

== Dance chart ==
The celebrities and professional partners danced one of these routines for each corresponding week:

- Week 1: Cha-cha-cha, foxtrot, samba, or tango
- Week 2: One unlearned dance
- Week 3: One unlearned dance
- Week 4: One unlearned dance
- Week 5: One unlearned dance
- Week 6: Freestyle

Dancing with the Stars (season 20) - Dance chart
Couple	Week						
Couple	1	2	3	4	5		6
Couple	1	2	3	4	Night 1	Night 2	6
Phil & Ash-Leigh	—	Viennese waltz	—	Paso doble	—	Foxtrot	Freestyle
Emily & Lyu	Samba	—	Contemp.	—	Quickstep	—	Freestyle
Christie & Craig	—	Viennese waltz	—	Cha-cha-cha	—	Samba	Freestyle
Mary & Aric	Tango	—	Samba	—	Paso doble	—	Freestyle
Paulini & Igor	Samba	—	Foxtrot	—	Jive	—	Freestyle
Virginia & Ian	—	Paso doble	—	Quickstep	—	Foxtrot	Freestyle
Laura & Danil	—	Jive	—	Foxtrot	—	Cha-cha-cha	
Pia & Declan	—	Cha-cha-cha	—	Argentine tango	—	Paso doble	
Sally & Mitch	—	Quickstep	—	Jive	—	Tango	
Issa & Lily	Foxtrot	—	Jive	—	Paso doble		
James & Natalie	Tango	—	Cha-cha-cha	—	Viennese waltz		
Gavin & Megan	Cha-cha-cha	—	Tango	—	Rumba		
Charlie & Ruby	—	Jive	—	Rumba			
Matt & Jessica	Foxtrot	—	Paso doble				

== Ratings ==
Episode		Original airdate		Viewers	Rank	Source
1	"Week One"	18 June 2023	Sunday 7:00 pm	647,000	3	
2	"Week Two"	25 June 2023	Sunday 7:00 pm	645,000	3	
3	"Week Three"	2 July 2023	Sunday 7:00 pm	647,000	5	
4	"Week Four"	9 July 2023	Sunday 7:00 pm	582,000	5	
5	"Week Five (a)"	16 July 2023	Sunday 7:00 pm	614,000	4	
6	"Week Five (b)"	17 July 2023	Monday 7:30 pm	552,000	8	
7	"Week Six Finale"	23 July 2023	Sunday 7:00 pm	702,000	3	
