= Dancing with the Stars (Australian TV series) season 21 =

Dancing with the Stars
- Season 21
- Hosted by: Chris Brown; Sonia Kruger
- Judges: Sharna Burgess; Craig Revel Horwood; Helen Richey; Mark Wilson
- Celebrity winner: Lisa McCune
- Professional winner: Ian Waite

Release
- Original network: Seven Network
- Original release: 7 July – 12 August 2024

Season chronology
- ← Previous; Season 20 Next → Season 22

The twenty-first season of the Australian Dancing with the Stars program premiered on 7 July 2024 on Seven.

Chris Brown replaced Daryl Somers who left the series after hosting the last three seasons. Sonia Kruger returned, moving to host. Craig Revel Horwood, Sharna Burgess, and Mark Wilson returned while Helen Richey, who took last season off, returned to the judging panel with Todd McKenney not joining this season due to a scheduling conflict.

== Couples ==
The season featured 12 couples.

On 3 February 2024, Ben Cousins was announced as the first celebrity participant. The rest of the celebrities were announced on 18 February 2024.

| Celebrity | Notability | Professional partner | Status |
|---|---|---|---|
| Nadia Bartel | Fashion designer & model | Lyu Masuda | Eliminated 1st on 21 July 2024 |
| Hayden Quinn | Television cook | Lily Cornish | Eliminated 2nd on 28 July 2024 |
| Julie Goodwin | MasterChef Australia winner & author | Andrey Gorbunov | Eliminated 3rd & 4th on 4 August 2024 |
| Nova Peris | Olympic field hockey player & politician | Craig Monley | Eliminated 3rd & 4th on 4 August 2024 |
| Ben Cousins | AFL player & 7NEWS sports presenter | Siobhan Power | Eliminated 5th on 11 August 2024 |
| Adam Dovile | Better Homes and Gardens presenter | Jessica Raffa | Eliminated 6th & 7th on 11 August 2024 |
| Shane Crawford | AFL player | Ash-Leigh Hunter | Eliminated 6th & 7th on 11 August 2024 |
| James Stewart | Home and Away actor | Jorja Freeman | Fifth place on 12 August 2024 |
| Nikki Osborne | Comedian | Aric Yegudkin | Fourth place on 12 August 2024 |
| Ant Middleton | SAS Australia: Who Dares Wins presenter | Alexandra Vladimirov | Third place on 12 August 2024 |
| Samantha Jade | Singer-songwriter | Gustavo Viglio | Runners-up on 12 August 2024 |
| Lisa McCune | Stage & screen actress | Ian Waite | Winners on 12 August 2024 |

== Scoring chart ==
The highest score each week is indicated in bold green with a dagger (†), while the lowest score each week is indicated in italicized red with a double-dagger (‡).

Color key:

Winners
Runners-up
Third place
Fourth place
Fifth place
Bottom two, three or four
Excused from competition for the week
Eliminated

Dancing with the Stars (season 21) - Weekly scores
| Couple | Pl. | Week | | | | | | | | |
| Couple | Pl. | 1 | 2 | 3 | 1+3 | 4 | 2+4 | 5 | 6 | |
| Couple | Pl. | 1 | 2 | 3 | 1+3 | 4 | 2+4 | 5 | Night 1 | Night 2 |
|---|---|---|---|---|---|---|---|---|---|---|
| Lisa & Ian | 1st | **30**† | — | 30 | **60**† | — | — | **39**† | **39**† | 40+39=**79**† |
| Samantha & Gustavo | 2nd | — | **31**† | — | — | **34**† | **65**† | **39**† | **39**† | 38+38=76 |
| Ant & Alexandra | 3rd | 18 | — | 30 | 48 | — | — | 27 | 37 | 34+36=70‡ |
| Nikki & Aric | 4th | — | 20 | — | — | 26 | 46 | 35 | 34 | 31 |
| James & Jorja | 5th | 25 | — | **31**† | 56 | — | — | 34 | 35 | 30‡ |
| Adam & Jessica | 6th | — | 26 | — | — | 28 | 54 | 32 | 28 | |
| Shane & Ash-Leigh | 6th | — | 22 | — | — | 26 | 48 | 29 | 30 | |
| Ben & Siobhan | 8th | 14‡ | — | 16 | 30‡ | — | — | 21 | 17‡ | |
| Julie & Andrey | 9th | — | — | 27 | 27 | — | — | 27 | | |
| Nova & Craig | 9th | — | 19‡ | — | — | 19‡ | 38‡ | 19‡ | | |
| Hayden & Lily | 11th | — | 20 | — | — | 27 | 47 | | | |
| Nadia & Lyu | 12th | 17 | — | 15‡ | 32 | | | | | |

== Weekly scores ==
Individual judges' scores in the charts below (given in parentheses) are listed in this order from left to right: Craig Revel Horwood, Helen Richey, Sharna Burgess, Mark Wilson.

=== Week 1 ===
Couples are listed in the order they performed.

Julie Goodwin was not able to perform this week, due to an injury she had sustained in rehearsal.

| Couple | Scores | Dance | Music |
|---|---|---|---|
| Lisa & Ian | 30 (7, 8, 8, 7) | Tango | "Rumour Has It" - Adele |
| Nadia & Lyu | 17 (3, 5, 5, 4) | Cha-cha-cha | "Treasure" - Bruno Mars |
| Ant & Alex | 18 (3, 5, 5, 5) | Paso doble | "Born to Be Wild" - Steppenwolf |
| James & Jorja | 25 (4, 6, 7, 8) | Cha-cha-cha | "Sway" - Michael Buble |
| Ben & Siobhan | 14 (2, 4, 4, 4) | Foxtrot | "Hallelujah I Love Her So" - Ray Charles |

=== Week 2 ===
Couples are listed in the order they performed.

| Couple | Scores | Dance | Music |
|---|---|---|---|
| Samantha & Gustavo | 31 (7, 8, 8, 8) | Quickstep | "Do Your Thing" - Basement Jaxx |
| Adam & Jess | 26 (5, 7, 7, 7) | Jive | "Rubberneckin'" - Elvis Presley |
| Nova & Craig | 19 (3, 6, 5, 5) | Viennese waltz | "Unforgettable" - Nat King Cole |
| Nikki & Aric | 20 (3, 5, 6, 6) | Cha-cha-cha | "I Wanna Dance with Somebody (Who Loves Me)" - Whitney Houston |
| Hayden & Lily | 20 (4, 6, 6, 4) | Tango | "Bones" - Imagine Dragons |
| Shane & Ash-Leigh | 22 (2, 7, 6, 7) | Cha-cha-cha | "Moves Like Jagger" - Maroon 5, feat. Christina Aguilera |

=== Week 3 ===
Couples are listed in the order they performed.

| Couple | Scores | Dance | Music | Result |
|---|---|---|---|---|
| Lisa & Ian | 30 (7, 8, 7, 8) | Jive | "Jailhouse Rock" - Elvis Presley | Safe |
| James & Jorja | 31 (5, 8, 9, 9) | Contemporary | "Before You Go" - Lewis Capaldi | Safe |
| Nadia & Lyu | 15 (3, 4, 4, 4) | Tango | "Poker Face" - Lady Gaga | Eliminated |
| Ant & Alex | 30 (6, 7, 8, 9) | Viennese waltz | "Until I Found You" - Stephen Sanchez | Safe |
| Ben & Siobhan | 16 (3, 5, 4, 4) | Cha-cha-cha | "Forget You" - Cee Lo Green | Bottom two |
| Julie & Andrey | 27 (6, 7, 7, 7) | Viennese waltz | "Breakaway" - Kelly Clarkson | Safe |

Dance-off performances

- Nadia & Lyu: "Come Away with Me" — Norah Jones (Waltz)
- Ben & Siobhan: "Rhythm Is Gonna Get You" — Gloria Estefan (Salsa)

Judges' votes to save

- Horwood: Nadia & Lyu
- Richey: Ben & Siobhan
- Burgess: Ben & Siobhan
- Wilson: Ben & Siobhan

=== Week 4 ===
Couples are listed in the order they performed.

| Couple | Scores | Dance | Music | Result |
|---|---|---|---|---|
| Nikki & Aric | 26 (6, 6, 7, 7) | Tango | "Toxic" – Britney Spears | Bottom two |
| Hayden & Lily | 27 (5, 7, 7, 8) | Rumba | "Why" – Annie Lennox | Eliminated |
| Samantha & Gustavo | 34 (8, 8, 8, 10) | Samba | "Lush Life" – Zara Larsson | Safe |
| Shane & Ash-Leigh | 26 (4, 7, 7, 8) | Viennese waltz | "I Won't Give Up" – Jason Mraz | Safe |
| Nova & Craig | 19 (3, 5, 5, 6) | Jive | "Dance with Me Tonight" – Olly Murs | Safe |
| Adam & Jessica | 28 (5, 7, 8, 8) | Argentine tango | "Assassin's Tango" – John Powell | Safe |

Dance-off performances

- Nikki & Aric: "Pencil Full of Lead" — Paolo Nutini (Charleston)
- Hayden & Lily: "Come Away with Me" — Norah Jones (Waltz)

Judges' votes to save

- Horwood: Nikki & Aric
- Richey: Nikki & Aric
- Burgess: Nikki & Aric
- Wilson: Did not vote

=== Week 5 ===
Couples are listed in the order they performed.

| Couple | Scores | Dance | Music | Result |
|---|---|---|---|---|
| Ant & Alexandra | 27 (5, 8, 7, 7) | Jive | "Wake Me Up Before You Go-Go" - Wham! | Safe |
| James & Jorja | 34 (7, 8, 10, 9) | Foxtrot | "I've Got You Under My Skin" - Frank Sinatra | Safe |
| Nikki & Aric | 35 (8, 9, 9, 9) | Rumba | "Shallow" - Lady Gaga & Bradley Cooper | Safe |
| Nova & Craig | 19 (4, 5, 5, 5) | Cha-cha-cha | "I Love the Nightlife (Disco 'Round)" - Alicia Bridges | Eliminated |
| Ben & Siobhan | 21 (4, 6, 5, 6) | Viennese waltz | "Bed of Roses" - Bon Jovi | Bottom three |
| Julie & Andrey | 27 (6, 7, 7, 7) | Foxtrot | "Big Spender" - Shirley Bassey | Eliminated |
| Adam & Jessica | 32 (7, 8, 8, 9) | Paso doble | "Best of You" - Foo Fighters | Safe |
| Lisa & Ian | 39 (9, 10, 10, 10) | Quickstep | "I Got Rhythm" - Judy Garland | Safe |
| Shane & Ash-Leigh | 29 (6, 8, 7, 8) | Samba | "Livin' la Vida Loca" - Ricky Martin | Safe |
| Samantha & Gustavo | 39 (9, 10, 10, 10) | Cha-cha-cha | "Respect" - Aretha Franklin | Safe |

=== Week 6 ===
Night 1 (Semi-final)

Couples are listed in the order they performed.

| Couple | Scores | Dance | Music | Result |
|---|---|---|---|---|
| Shane & Ash-Leigh | 30 (6, 8, 8, 8) | Quickstep | "Ballroom Blitz" - The Sweet | Eliminated |
| Adam & Jessica | 28 (4, 7, 9, 8) | Rumba | "Make You Feel My Love" - Adele | Eliminated |
| Nikki & Aric | 34 (8, 8, 9, 9) | Quickstep | "Valerie" - Mark Ronson & Amy Winehouse | Safe |
| Ant & Alexandra | 37 (7, 10, 10, 10) | Contemporary | "Into My Arms" - Nick Cave | Safe |
| Ben & Siobhan | 17 (2, 5, 5, 5) | Argentine tango | "In the Air Tonight" - Phil Collins | Eliminated immediately |
| Samantha & Gustavo | 39 (9, 10, 10, 10) | Foxtrot | "Let's Call the Whole Thing Off" - Sarah Vaughan | Safe |
| Lisa & Ian | 39 (9, 10, 10, 10) | Viennese waltz | "Golden Hour" - JVKE | Safe |
| James & Jorja | 35 (9, 8, 9, 9) | Paso doble | "Bad Habits" - Ed Sheeran | Bottom four |

Dance-off performances

- Adam & Jessica: "Rhythm Is Gonna Get You" — Gloria Estefan (Salsa)
- James & Jorja: "Pencil Full of Lead" — Paolo Nutini (Charleston)
- Shane & Ash-Leigh: "Rhythm Is Gonna Get You" — Gloria Estefan (Salsa)

Judges' votes to save

- Horwood: James & Jorja
- Richey: James & Jorja
- Burgess: James & Jorja
- Wilson: Shane & Ash-Leigh

Night 2 (Final)

During the first round, the couples performed their freestyle routine. Once the fifth and fourth places had been announced, the top three couples performed their favorite dance of the season. Couples are listed in the order they performed.

| Couple | Scores | Dance | Music | Result |
|---|---|---|---|---|
| Samantha & Gustavo | 38 (9, 10, 10, 9) | Freestyle | "Show Me How You Burlesque" - Christina Aguilera | Runners-up |
| Samantha & Gustavo | 38 (9, 9, 10, 10) | Foxtrot | "Let's Call the Whole Thing Off" - Sarah Vaughan | Runners-up |
| James & Jorja | 30 (7, 7, 9, 7) | Freestyle | "Trouble" - Elvis Presley/"Hit the Road Jack" - 2WEI | Fifth place |
| Nikki & Aric | 31 (7, 7, 9, 8) | Freestyle | "Bad Guy" - Billie Eilish | Fourth place |
| Ant & Alexandra | 34 (8, 8, 8, 10) | Freestyle | "Burn" - 2WEI feat. Edda Hayes | Third place |
| Ant & Alexandra | 36 (8, 8, 10, 10) | Contemporary | "Into My Arms" - Nick Cave | Third place |
| Lisa & Ian | 40 (10, 10, 10, 10) | Freestyle | "That's Entertainment!" - Judy Garland | Winners |
| Lisa & Ian | 39 (10, 10, 9, 10) | Viennese waltz | "Golden Hour" - JVKE | Winners |

== Ratings ==
| Episode | | Original airdate | | Total Viewers^{[a]} | Rank | Source |
|---|---|---|---|---|---|---|
| 1 | "Week One" | 7 July 2024 | Sunday; 7:00 pm | 938,000 | 4 | |
| 2 | "Week Two" | 14 July 2024 | Sunday; 7:00 pm | 927,000 | 5 | |
| 3 | "Week Three" | 21 July 2024 | Sunday; 7:00 pm | 989,000 | 4 | |
| 4 | "Week Four" | 28 July 2024 | Sunday; 7:00 pm | 743,000 | 11 | |
| 5 | "Week Five" | 4 August 2024 | Sunday; 7:00 pm | 780,000 | 8 | |
| 6 | "Week Six (Night 1)" | 11 August 2024 | Sunday; 7:00 pm | 882,000 | 6 | |
| 7 | "Week Six (Night 2)" | 12 August 2024 | Monday; 7:00 pm | 889,000 | 6 | |

- ^{a} From 28 January 2024, OzTAM ratings changed. Viewership data now focus on National Reach and National Total ratings instead of the 5 metro centres and overnight shares.
