= Dancing with the Stars: All Stars =

Dancing with the Stars: All Stars may refer to:

- Dancing with the Stars (American season 15)
- Dancing with the Stars (Australian season 18)
- Dancing with the Stars (Australian season 19)

== See also ==
- Dancing with the Stars
