= Dancing with the Stars (Australian TV series) season 1 =

Dancing with the Stars
- Season 1
- Hosted by: Daryl Somers; Sonia Kruger
- Judges: Todd McKenney; Paul Mercurio; Helen Richey; Mark Wilson
- Celebrity winner: Bec Cartwright
- Professional winner: Michael Miziner
- No. of episodes: 8

Release
- Original network: Seven Network
- Original release: 5 October – 23 November 2004

Season chronology
- Next → Season 2

The first season of the Australian Dancing with the Stars premiered on 5 October 2004. Daryl Somers and Sonia Kruger served as the hosts, while Todd McKenney, Paul Mercurio, Helen Richey, and Mark Wilson served as the judges.

Home and Away actress Bec Cartwright and Michael Mizner were announced as the winners on 23 November 2004, while politician Pauline Hanson and Salvatore Vecchio finished in second place.

== Couples ==
This season featured eight celebrity contestants.

| Celebrity | Notability | Professional partner | Status |
|---|---|---|---|
| James Tomkins | Olympic rower | Patrice Smith | Eliminated 1st on 12 October 2004 |
| Gabrielle Richens | Model | Mark Hodge | Eliminated 2nd on 19 October 2004 |
| Katrina Warren | Veterinarian | Csaba Szirmai | Eliminated 3rd on 26 October 2004 |
| Matt Shirvington | Olympic sprinter | Natalie Lowe | Eliminated 4th on 2 November 2004 |
| John Wood | Actor | Jenni Pedersen | Eliminated 5th on 9 November 2004 |
| Justin Melvey | Television actor | Kym Johnson | Eliminated 6th on 16 November 2004 |
| Pauline Hanson | Politician | Salvatore Vecchio | Runners-up on 23 November 2004 |
| Bec Cartwright | Home and Away actress | Michael Miziner | Winners on 23 November 2004 |

== Scoring chart ==
The highest score each week is indicated in bold green with a dagger (†), while the lowest score each week is indicated in italicized red with a double-dagger (‡).

Color key:

Winners
Runners-up
Withdrew from competition
Eliminated

Dancing with the Stars (season 1) - Weekly scores
| Couple | Pl. | Avg. | Week | | | | | | | | |
| Couple | Pl. | Avg. | 1 | 2 | 1+2 | 3 | 4 | 5 | 6 | 7 | 8 |
|---|---|---|---|---|---|---|---|---|---|---|---|
| Bec & Michael | 1st | 32.4 | ?? | 32 | ?? | ?? | ?? | ?? | ??+??=?? | ??+??=?? | 33+37+40=**110**† (Note: This couple finished in first place.) |
| Pauline & Salvatore | 2nd | 25.7 | 14 | 29 | 43 | ?? | ?? | ?? | ??+??=?? | ??+??=?? | ??+??+??=87‡ (Note: This couple finished in second place.) |
| Justin & Kym | 3rd | 30.5 | ?? | ?? | ?? | ?? | ?? | ?? | ??+??=?? | 36+??=?? (Note: This couple was eliminated.) | |
| John & Jenni | 4th | 24.8 | ?? | ?? | ?? | ?? | ?? | ?? | ??+??=?? | | |
| Matt & Natalie | 5th | 27.8 | ?? | ?? | ?? | ?? | ?? | ?? | | | |
| Katrina & Csaba | 6th | 24.5 | ?? | ?? | ?? | ?? | ?? | | | | |
| Gabrielle & Mark | 7th | 26.6 | ?? | 32 | ?? | ?? | | | | | |
| James & Patrice | 8th | 25.0 | 26 | 24 | 50 | | | | | | |

== Dance chart ==
The couples performed the following each week:

- Week 1: One unlearned dance (Cha-cha-cha or Waltz)
- Week 2: One unlearned dance (Quickstep or Rumba)
- Week 3: One unlearned dance (Jive or Tango)
- Week 4: One unlearned dance (Foxtrot or Paso Doble)
- Week 5: Samba
- Week 6: Two unlearned dances
- Week 7: Two unlearned dances
- Week 8: Favorite ballroom dance, Favorite latin dance, and Freestyle

Dancing with the Stars (season 1) - Dance chart
| Couple | Week | | | | | | | | | | | |
| Couple | 1 | 2 | 3 | 4 | 5 | 6 | | 7 | | 8 | | |
|---|---|---|---|---|---|---|---|---|---|---|---|---|
| Bec & Michael | Waltz | Rumba | Tango | Paso Doble | Samba | Foxtrot | Jive | Quickstep | Cha-Cha-Cha | ?? | Rumba | Freestyle |
| Pauline & Salvatore | Cha-Cha-Cha | Quickstep | Jive | Foxtrot | Samba | Tango | Paso Doble | Waltz | Rumba | ?? | Samba | Freestyle |
| Justin & Kym | Cha-Cha-Cha | Quickstep | Jive | Foxtrot | Samba | Waltz | ?? | Tango | ?? | | | |
| John & Jenni | Waltz | Rumba | Tango | Paso Doble | Samba | ?? | ?? | | | | | |
| Matt & Natalie | Waltz | Rumba | Tango | Paso Doble | Samba | | | | | | | |
| Katrina & Csaba | Cha-Cha-Cha | Quickstep | Jive | Foxtrot | | | | | | | | |
| Gabrielle & Mark | Waltz | Rumba | Tango | | | | | | | | | |
| James & Patrice | Cha-Cha-Cha | Quickstep | | | | | | | | | | |

| Preceded by None | Dancing with the Stars (Australian version); Season 1 | Succeeded by Dancing with the Stars (Australian season 2) |
