= Dancing with the Stars (Australian TV series) season 4 =

Dancing with the Stars
- Season 4
- Hosted by: Daryl Somers; Sonia Kruger
- Judges: Todd McKenney; Paul Mercurio; Helen Richey; Mark Wilson
- Celebrity winner: Grant Denyer
- Professional winner: Amanda Garner
- No. of episodes: 10

Release
- Original network: Seven Network
- Original release: 21 February – 9 May 2006

Season chronology
- ← Previous; Season 3 Next → Season 5

The fourth season of the Australian Dancing with the Stars premiered on 21 February 2006. Daryl Somers and Sonia Kruger returned as hosts, while Todd McKenney, Paul Mercurio, Helen Richey, and Mark Wilson returned as judges.

Weather presenter Grant Denyer and Amanda Garner were announced as the winners on 9 May 2006, while professional boxer Kostya Tszyu and Luda Kroitor finished in second place.

== Couples ==
This season featured ten celebrity contestants.

| Celebrity | Notability | Professional partner | Status |
|---|---|---|---|
| Ian "Molly" Meldrum | Music critic | Alana Patience | Eliminated 1st on 28 February 2006 |
| Luke Ricketson | NRL player | Eliza Campagna | Eliminated 2nd on 7 March 2006 |
| Alicia Molik | Tennis player | John Paul Collins | Eliminated 3rd on 14 March 2006 |
| Simone Callahan | Shane Warne's ex-wife | Gordon Derbogosijan | Eliminated 4th on 28 March 2006 |
| Jennifer Hawkins | Miss Universe 2004 | Sergei Bolgarschii | Eliminated 5th on 4 April 2006 |
| Kate Langbroek | Television presenter | Alexander Bryan | Eliminated 6th on 18 April 2006 |
| Noeline Brown | Actress | Carmello Pizzino | Eliminated 7th on 25 April 2006 |
| Toby Allen | Singer | Leanne Bampton | Eliminated 8th on 2 May 2006 |
| Kostya Tszyu | Professional boxer | Luda Kroitor | Runners-up on 9 May 2006 |
| Grant Denyer | Weather presenter | Amanda Garner | Winners on 9 May 2006 |

== Scoring chart ==
The highest score each week is indicated in bold green with a dagger (†), while the lowest score each week is indicated in italicized red with a double-dagger (‡).

Color key:

Winners
Runners-up
Bottom two
Eliminated

Dancing with the Stars (season 4) - Weekly scores
| Couple | Pl. | Week | | | | | | | | | | |
| Couple | Pl. | 1 | 2 | 1+2 | 3 | 4 | 5 | 6 | 7 | 8 | 9 | 10 |
|---|---|---|---|---|---|---|---|---|---|---|---|---|
| Grant & Amanda | 1st | 25 | 29 | 54 | 31 | 31 | 25 | 25 | **39**† | 30+31=61 | 29+36=**65**† | 36+40+33=**109**† (Note: This couple finished in first place.) |
| Kostya & Luda | 2nd | 26 | 27 | 53 | 30 | 26 | 31 | 27 | 31 | 31+31=**62**† (Note: This couple was in the bottom two, but was not eliminated.) | 24+28=52‡ | 33+34+34=101‡ (Note: This couple finished in second place.) |
| Toby & Leanne | 3rd | **32**† | **32**† | **64**† | **35**† | **32**† | **32**† | **34**† | 35 | 30+32=**62**† | 35+28=63 (Note: This couple was eliminated.) | |
| Noeline & Carmello | 4th | 23 | 26 | 49 | 28 | 24 | 24 | 18‡ | 23 | 22+20=42‡ | | |
| Kate & Alex | 5th | 19 | 25 | 44 | 19‡ | 16‡ | 18‡ | 24 | 17‡ | | | |
| Jennifer & Serghei | 6th | 25 | 31 | 56 | 26 | 31 | 29 | 24 | | | | |
| Simone & Gordon | 7th | 14‡ | 24 | 38‡ | 22 | 21 | 19 | | | | | |
| Alicia & John-Paul | 8th | 23 | 20‡ | 43 | 26 | 18 | | | | | | |
| Luke & Eliza | 9th | 19 | 28 | 47 | 25 | | | | | | | |
| Molly & Alana | 10th | 16 | 22 | 38‡ | | | | | | | | |

== Weekly scores ==
Individual judges scores in the chart below (given in parentheses) are listed in this order from left to right: Todd McKenney, Helen Richey, Paul Mercurio, Mark Wilson.

=== Week 1 ===
Couples performed either the cha-cha-cha or the waltz, and are listed in the order they performed.

| Couple | Scores | Dance | Music |
|---|---|---|---|
| Grant & Amanda | 25 (5, 6, 7, 7) | Cha-cha-cha | "Mustang Sally" — Wilson Pickett |
| Jennifer & Sergei | 25 (7, 7, 6, 5) | Waltz | "Lotus" — Secret Garden |
| Luke & Eliza | 19 (4, 5, 5, 5) | Cha-cha-cha | "Don't Cha" — The Pussycat Dolls |
| Kate & Alexander | 19 (3, 5, 6, 5) | Waltz | "Tennessee Waltz" — Pee Wee King |
| Noeline & Carmello | 23 (6, 6, 5, 6) | Cha-cha-cha | "Tea for Two" — Louise Groody & John Barker |
| Toby & Leanne | 32 (8, 8, 8, 8) | Waltz | "What the World Needs Now Is Love" — Dionne Warwick |
| Simone & Gordon | 14 (3, 4, 3, 4) | Cha-cha-cha | "I Will Survive" — Gloria Gaynor |
| Alicia & John Paul | 23 (5, 5, 7, 6) | Waltz | "I Have Nothing" — Whitney Houston |
| Molly & Alana | 16 (5, 4, 3, 4) | Cha-cha-cha | "You Can Leave Your Hat On" — Joe Cocker & "Can You Feel It" — The Jacksons |
| Kostya & Luda | 26 (7, 6, 7, 6) | Waltz | "From Russia with Love" — Matt Monro |

=== Week 2 ===
Musical guests: Westlife

Couples performed either the quickstep or the rumba, and are listed in the order they performed.

| Couple | Scores | Dance | Music | Result |
|---|---|---|---|---|
| Kostya & Luda | 27 (7, 7, 6, 7) | Rumba | "Hero" — Mariah Carey | Safe |
| Luke & Eliza | 28 (7, 7, 7, 7) | Quickstep | "I Get a Kick Out of You" — Frank Sinatra | Safe |
| Alicia & John Paul | 20 (5, 5, 5, 5) | Rumba | "Untitled (How Could This Happen to Me?)" — Simple Plan | Bottom two |
| Molly & Alana | 22 (6, 5, 5, 6) | Quickstep | "Walk Like an Egyptian" — The Bangles | Eliminated |
| Jennifer & Sergei | 31 (8, 7, 8, 8) | Rumba | "You're Beautiful" — James Blunt | Safe |
| Grant & Amanda | 29 (7, 7, 8, 7) | Quickstep | "Do Your Thing" — Basement Jaxx | Safe |
| Kate & Alexander | 25 (6, 6, 6, 7) | Rumba | "Only Time" — Enya | Safe |
| Noeline & Carmello | 26 (7, 6, 6, 7) | Quickstep | "Le Jazz Hot!" — Henry Mancini | Safe |
| Toby & Leanne | 32 (8, 8, 7, 9) | Rumba | "Father Figure" — George Michael | Safe |
| Simone & Gordon | 24 (6, 6, 6, 6) | Quickstep | "Bewitched Theme" — The Hit Crew | Safe |

=== Week 3 ===
Couples performed either the jive or the tango, and are listed in the order they performed.

| Couple | Scores | Dance | Music | Result |
|---|---|---|---|---|
| Jennifer & Sergei | 26 (6, 7, 7, 6) | Tango | "Libertango" — Bond | Safe |
| Luke & Eliza | 25 (5, 6, 7, 7) | Jive | "L-O-V-E" — Nat King Cole | Eliminated |
| Kate & Alexander | 19 (5, 5, 4, 5) | Tango | "Turning Japanese" — The Vapors | Bottom two |
| Kostya & Luda | 30 (7, 7, 8, 8) | Tango | "Wags the Dog, He Likes to Tango" — The Wiggles | Safe |
| Simone & Gordon | 22 (6, 5, 6, 5) | Jive | "Are You Gonna Be My Girl" — Jet | Safe |
| Toby & Leanne | 35 (9, 8, 9, 9) | Tango | "Peter Gunn" — Henry Mancini | Safe |
| Noeline & Carmello | 28 (8, 6, 7, 7) | Jive | "Stuff Like That There" — Bette Midler | Safe |
| Alicia & John Paul | 26 (6, 6, 7, 7) | Tango | "Objection (Tango)" — Shakira | Safe |
| Grant & Amanda | 31 (8, 7, 8, 8) | Jive | "Wake Me Up Before You Go-Go" — Wham! | Safe |

=== Week 4 ===
Couples performed either the foxtrot or the paso doble, and are listed in the order they performed.

| Couple | Scores | Dance | Music | Result |
|---|---|---|---|---|
| Kostya & Luda | 26 (6, 7, 7, 6) | Paso doble | "Gonna Fly Now" — DeEtta West & Nelson Pigford | Safe |
| Simone & Gordon | 21 (5, 5, 6, 5) | Foxtrot | "Theme from New York, New York" — Frank Sinatra | Safe |
| Alicia & John Paul | 18 (2, 5, 7, 4) | Paso doble | "Best of You" — Foo Fighters | Eliminated |
| Kate & Alexander | 16 (5, 4, 4, 3) | Paso doble | "Theme from Star Wars" — John Williams | Bottom two |
| Grant & Amanda | 31 (8, 8, 8, 7) | Foxtrot | "A Foggy Day" — Fred Astaire | Safe |
| Jennifer & Sergei | 31 (7, 8, 8, 8) | Paso doble | "España cañí" — Erich Kunzel | Safe |
| Noeline & Carmello | 24 (6, 6, 6, 6) | Foxtrot | "Rose's Turn" — Bette Midler | Safe |
| Toby & Leanne | 32 (8, 8, 7, 9) | Paso doble | "Superstar" — from Jesus Christ Superstar | Safe |

=== Week 5 ===
Musical guest: Olivia Newton-John

Couples performed the samba and are listed in the order they performed.

| Couple | Scores | Dance | Music | Result |
|---|---|---|---|---|
| Grant & Amanda | 25 (6, 7, 7, 5) | Samba | "Livin' la Vida Loca" — Ricky Martin | Safe |
| Jennifer & Sergei | 29 (7, 8, 6, 8) | Samba | "Lo-Lo Džama" — Šum svistu | Safe |
| Kostya & Luda | 31 (8, 8, 8, 7) | Samba | "Tequila" — The Champs | Safe |
| Simone & Gordon | 19 (4, 5, 5, 5) | Samba | "You Make Me Feel Like Dancing" — Leo Sayer | Eliminated |
| Toby & Leanne | 32 (7, 8, 8, 9) | Samba | "I'm Going Bananas" — Madonna | Safe |
| Kate & Alexander | 18 (4, 4, 5, 5) | Samba | "Gasolina" — Daddy Yankee | Bottom two |
| Noeline & Carmello | 24 (6, 6, 6, 6) | Samba | "Copacabana" — Barry Manilow | Safe |

=== Week 6 ===
Couples are listed in the order they performed.

| Couple | Scores | Dance | Music | Result |
|---|---|---|---|---|
| Toby & Leanne | 34 (9, 9, 8, 8) | Cha-cha-cha | "You Should Be Dancing" — Bee Gees | Safe |
| Kostya & Luda | 27 (6, 7, 8, 6) | Viennese waltz | "Waltz No. 2" — Dmitri Shostakovich | Safe |
| Jennifer & Sergei | 24 (5, 6, 6, 7) | Jive | "Just a Gigolo" — Irving Caesar | Eliminated |
| Kate & Alexander | 24 (6, 6, 6, 6) | Viennese waltz | "Once Upon a Dream" — from Sleeping Beauty | Safe |
| Noeline & Carmello | 18 (5, 5, 4, 4) | Rumba | "You've Got a Friend" — James Taylor | Bottom two |
| Grant & Amanda | 25 (6, 6, 7, 6) | Waltz | "If You Don't Know Me by Now" — Simply Red | Safe |

=== Week 7 ===
Musical guest: Shannon Noll

Couples are listed in the order they performed.

| Couple | Scores | Dance | Music | Result |
|---|---|---|---|---|
| Kate & Alexander | 17 (3, 4, 5, 5) | Jive | "Mickey" — Toni Basil | Eliminated |
| Kostya & Luda | 31 (8, 7, 8, 8) | Foxtrot | "Change Partners" — Vic Damone | Safe |
| Noeline & Carmello | 23 (6, 6, 5, 6) | Tango | "Whatever Lola Wants" — Sarah Vaughan | Bottom two |
| Toby & Leanne | 35 (9, 9, 8, 9) | Viennese waltz | "Tenterfield Saddler" — Peter Allen | Safe |
| Grant & Amanda | 39 (10, 9, 10, 10) | Paso doble | "Pump It" — Black Eyed Peas | Safe |

=== Week 8 ===
Musical guest: Mark Sholtez

Each couple performed two routines and are listed in the order they performed.

| Couple | Scores | Dance | Music | Result |
|---|---|---|---|---|
| Toby & Leanne | 30 (7, 8, 7, 8) | Jive | "Time Warp" — from The Rocky Horror Show | Safe |
| Toby & Leanne | 32 (8, 9, 7, 8) | Foxtrot | "Can't Take My Eyes Off You" — Frankie Valli | Safe |
| Noeline & Carmello | 20 (6, 5, 5, 4) | Viennese waltz | "Storybook" — David Campbell | Eliminated |
| Noeline & Carmello | 22 (6, 6, 5, 5) | Paso doble | "The Shady Dame from Seville" — from Victor/Victoria | Eliminated |
| Kostya & Luda | 31 (8, 8, 8, 7) | Quickstep | "Zing! Went the Strings of My Heart" — Hal Le Roy & Eunice Healey | Safe |
| Kostya & Luda | 31 (7, 8, 8, 8) | Jive | "Do You Love Me" — The Contours | Safe |
| Grant & Amanda | 30 (7, 8, 9, 6) | Tango | "El Tango de Roxanne" — from Moulin Rouge! | Safe |
| Grant & Amanda | 31 (9, 7, 8, 7) | Viennese waltz | "Chim Chim Cher-ee" — from Mary Poppins | Safe |

=== Week 9 ===
Musical guests: The Veronicas

Each couple performed two routines, one of which was the American Smooth, and are listed in the order they performed.

| Couple | Scores | Dance | Music | Result |
|---|---|---|---|---|
| Kostya & Luda | 24 (6, 6, 6, 6) | Cha-cha-cha | "Something Worth Fighting For" — Larisa Dolina | Bottom two |
| Kostya & Luda | 28 (7, 7, 7, 7) | American Smooth | "Beauty and the Beast" — from Beauty and the Beast | Bottom two |
| Toby & Leanne | 35 (9, 9, 8, 9) | American Smooth | "Orange Colored Sky" — Natalie Cole | Eliminated |
| Toby & Leanne | 28 (6, 8, 6, 8) | Quickstep | "Duelling Banjos" — from Deliverance | Eliminated |
| Grant & Amanda | 29 (6, 7, 8, 8) | Rumba | "I Hate You Then I Love You" — Luciano Pavarotti & Celine Dion | Safe |
| Grant & Amanda | 36 (9, 9, 9, 9) | American Smooth | "Singin' in the Rain" — from Singin' in the Rain | Safe |

=== Week 10 ===
Musical guests: Alex Lloyd & The Young Divas

Each couple performed three routines: their favourite ballroom dance, favourite Latin dance, and their freestyle routine. Couples are listed in the order they performed.

| Couple | Scores | Dance | Music | Result |
|---|---|---|---|---|
| Kostya & Luda | 33 (8, 9, 8, 8) | Quickstep | "Zing! Went the Strings of My Heart" — Hal Le Roy & Eunice Healey | Runners-up |
| Kostya & Luda | 34 (9, 8, 9, 8) | Samba | "Tequila" — The Champs | Runners-up |
| Kostya & Luda | 34 (8, 8, 10, 8) | Freestyle | "The Old Fashioned Way" — Charles Aznavour | Runners-up |
| Grant & Amanda | 36 (9, 9, 9, 9) | Foxtrot | "A Foggy Day" — Fred Astaire | Winners |
| Grant & Amanda | 40 (10, 10, 10, 10) | Paso doble | "Pump It" — Black Eyed Peas | Winners |
| Grant & Amanda | 33 (8, 8, 9, 8) | Freestyle | "The Ding-Dong Daddy of the D-Car Line" — Cherry Poppin' Daddies & "Sing, Sing, Sing (With a Swing)" — Benny Goodman | Winners |

== Dance chart ==
The couples performed the following each week:

- Week 1: One unlearned dance (Cha-cha-cha or waltz)
- Week 2: One unlearned dance (Quickstep or rumba)
- Week 3: One unlearned dance (Jive or tango)
- Week 4: One unlearned dance (Foxtrot or paso doble)
- Week 5: Samba
- Weeks 6–7: One unlearned dance
- Week 8: Two unlearned dances
- Week 9: One unlearned dance & American Smooth
- Week 10: Two favourite dances of the season & freestyle

Dancing with the Stars (season 4) - Dance chart
| Couple | Week | | | | | | | | | | | | | |
| Couple | 1 | 2 | 3 | 4 | 5 | 6 | 7 | 8 | | 9 | | 10 | | |
|---|---|---|---|---|---|---|---|---|---|---|---|---|---|---|
| Grant & Amanda | Cha-cha-cha | Quickstep | Jive | Foxtrot | Samba | Waltz | Paso doble | Tango | Viennese waltz | Rumba | American Smooth | Foxtrot | Paso doble | Freestyle |
| Kostya & Luda | Waltz | Rumba | Tango | Paso doble | Samba | Quickstep | Foxtrot | Viennese waltz | Jive | Cha-cha-cha | American Smooth | Quickstep | Samba | Freestyle |
| Toby & Leanne | Waltz | Rumba | Tango | Paso doble | Samba | Cha-cha-cha | Viennese waltz | Jive | Foxtrot | American Smooth | Quickstep | | | |
| Noeline & Carmello | Cha-cha-cha | Quickstep | Jive | Foxtrot | Samba | Rumba | Tango | Waltz | Paso doble | | | | | |
| Kate & Alex | Waltz | Rumba | Tango | Paso doble | Samba | Viennese waltz | Jive | | | | | | | |
| Jennifer & Serghei | Waltz | Rumba | Tango | Paso doble | Samba | Jive | | | | | | | | |
| Simone & Gordon | Cha-cha-cha | Quickstep | Jive | Foxtrot | Samba | | | | | | | | | |
| Alicia & John Paul | Waltz | Rumba | Tango | Paso doble | | | | | | | | | | |
| Luke & Eliza | Cha-cha-cha | Quickstep | Jive | | | | | | | | | | | |
| Molly & Alana | Cha-cha-cha | Quickstep | | | | | | | | | | | | |

| Preceded by Dancing with the Stars (Australian season 3) | Dancing with the Stars (Australian version); Season 4 | Succeeded by Dancing with the Stars (Australian season 5) |
