= Dancing with the Stars (Australian TV series) season 3 =

Dancing with the Stars
- Season 3
- Hosted by: Daryl Somers; Sonia Kruger
- Judges: Todd McKenney; Paul Mercurio; Helen Richey; Mark Wilson
- Celebrity winner: Ada Nicodemou
- Professional winner: Aric Yegudkin
- No. of episodes: 10

Release
- Original network: Seven Network
- Original release: 6 September – 8 November 2005

Season chronology
- ← Previous; Season 2 Next → Season 4

The third season of the Australian Dancing with the Stars premiered on 6 September 2005. Daryl Somers and Sonia Kruger returned as hosts, while Todd McKenney, Paul Mercurio, Helen Richey, and Mark Wilson returned as judges.

Home and Away actress Ada Nicodemou and Aric Yegudkin were announced as the winners on 8 November 2005, while Seven News presenter Chris Bath and Trenton Shipley finished in second place.

== Couples ==
This season featured ten celebrity contestants.

Celebrity	Notability	Professional partner	Status
Tania Zaetta	Television presenter	Michael Miziner	Eliminated 1st on 13 September 2005
Michael Caton	Actor	Kym Johnson	Eliminated 2nd on 20 September 2005
Ky Hurst	Ironman	Masha Belash	Eliminated 3rd on 27 September 2005
Nicky Buckley	Television presenter	Andrew Palmer	Eliminated 4th on 4 October 2005
Dawn Fraser	Olympic swimmer	Gordon Gilkes	Eliminated 5th on 11 October 2005
David Campbell	Singer	Luda Kroitor	Eliminated 6th on 18 October 2005
Brodie Holland	AFL player	Alana Patience	Eliminated 7th on 25 October 2005
Ian "Dicko" Dickson	Television presenter	Leanne Bampton	Eliminated 8th on 2 November 2005
Chris Bath	Seven News presenter	Trenton Shipley	Runners-up on 9 November 2005
Ada Nicodemou	Home and Away actress	Aric Yegudkin	Winners on 9 November 2005

== Scoring chart ==
The highest score each week is indicated in bold green with a dagger (†), while the lowest score each week is indicated in italicized red with a double-dagger (‡).

Color key:

Winners
Runners-up
Bottom two
Eliminated

Dancing with the Stars (season 3) - Weekly scores
Couple	Pl.	Week										
Couple	Pl.	1	2	1+2	3	4	5	6	7	8	9	10
Ada & Aric	1st	24	24	48	29	29	**32**†	31	**34**†	32+24=56	30+35=65	36+33+34=103‡ (Note: This couple finished in first place.)
Chris & Trenton	2nd	**30**†	**28**†	**58**†	**33**†	**31**†	31	31	33	29+29=58	28+40=**68**† (Note: This couple was in the bottom two, but was not eliminated.)	32+34+40=**106**† (Note: This couple finished in second place.)
Dicko & Leanne	3rd	28	23	51	30	26	24	**32**†	29	35+27=**62**†	26+37=63‡ (Note: This couple was eliminated.)	
Brodie & Alana	4th	21	18	39‡	30	25	27	23	28	18+20=38‡		
David & Luda	5th	27	26	53	27	27	29	28	24‡			
Dawn & Gordon	6th	24	22	46	24	17‡	23	21‡				
Nicky & Andrew	7th	20‡	23	43	26	23	20‡					
Ky & Masha	8th	24	24	48	26	25						
Michael & Kym	9th	23	21	44	22‡							
Tania & Michael	10th	23	17‡	40								

== Weekly scores ==
Individual judges scores in the chart below (given in parentheses) are listed in this order from left to right: Todd McKenney, Helen Richey, Paul Mercurio, Mark Wilson.

=== Week 1 ===
Couples performed either the cha-cha-cha or the waltz, and are listed in the order they performed.

Couple	Scores	Dance	Music
Ada & Aric	24 (6, 6, 6, 6)	Cha-cha-cha	"Come On Over Baby (All I Want Is You)" — Christina Aguilera
David & Luda	27 (6, 7, 7, 7)	Waltz	"Open Arms" — Air Supply
Dicko & Leanne	28 (7, 7, 7, 7)	Cha-cha-cha	"Bad" — Michael Jackson
Chris & Trenton	30 (6, 8, 8, 8)	Waltz	"Weekend in New England" — Barry Manilow
Michael & Kym	23 (6, 6, 6, 5)	Cha-cha-cha	"Sway" — Michael Bublé
Ky & Masha	24 (5, 6, 7, 6)	Waltz	"Dreamcatcher" — Secret Garden
Tania & Michael	23 (5, 6, 6, 6)	Cha-cha-cha	"Me Against the Music" — Britney Spears & Madonna
Nicky & Andrew	20 (5, 5, 5, 5)	Waltz	"A Time for Us" — Henry Mancini
Brodie & Alana	21 (4, 6, 5, 6)	Cha-cha-cha	"Rock DJ" — Robbie Williams
Dawn & Gordon	24 (6, 6, 6, 6)	Waltz	"I Still Call Australia Home" — Peter Allen

=== Week 2 ===
Couples performed either the quickstep or the rumba, and are listed in the order they performed.

Couple	Scores	Dance	Music	Result
David & Luda	26 (6, 7, 6, 7)	Rumba	"Chains" — Tina Arena	Safe
Tania & Michael	17 (4, 5, 4, 4)	Quickstep	"Almost Like Being in Love" — Frank Sinatra	Eliminated
Dawn & Gordon	22 (5, 6, 5, 6)	Rumba	"Out of Reach" — Gabrielle	Safe
Brodie & Alana	18 (3, 5, 5, 5)	Quickstep	"Part-Time Lover" — Stevie Wonder	Safe
Chris & Trenton	28 (7, 7, 7, 7)	Rumba	"Secret" — Maroon 5	Safe
Ada & Aric	24 (6, 6, 6, 6)	Quickstep	"Go Daddy-O" — Big Bad Voodoo Daddy	Safe
Ky & Masha	24 (6, 6, 6, 6)	Rumba	"Take My Breath Away" — Jessica Simpson	Bottom two
Michael & Kym	21 (6, 6, 4, 5)	Quickstep	"Let's Face the Music and Dance" — Robbie Williams	Safe
Nicky & Andrew	23 (5, 6, 6, 6)	Rumba	"The Lady in Red" — Chris de Burgh	Safe
Dicko & Leanne	23 (8, 5, 5, 5)	Quickstep	"The Muppet Show Theme" — Jim Henson & Sam Pottle	Safe

=== Week 3 ===
Couples performed either the jive or the tango, and are listed in the order they performed.

Couple	Scores	Dance	Music	Result
Dicko & Leanne	30 (7, 6, 8, 9)	Jive	"Greased Lightnin'" — from Grease	Safe
Michael & Kym	22 (6, 5, 5, 6)	Jive	"Great Balls of Fire" — Jerry Lee Lewis	Eliminated
Nicky & Andrew	26 (6, 6, 7, 7)	Tango	"Hey Sexy Lady" — Shaggy	Safe
Ada & Aric	29 (8, 7, 7, 7)	Jive	"Mambo No. 5" — Lou Bega	Safe
Ky & Masha	26 (6, 6, 7, 7)	Tango	"Tanguera" — Musica & Poesia	Safe
Dawn & Gordon	24 (6, 6, 6, 6)	Tango	"Guapita" — Malando	Bottom two
Brodie & Alana	30 (7, 7, 8, 8)	Jive	"Saturday Night's Alright for Fighting" — Elton John	Safe
David & Luda	27 (7, 6, 7, 7)	Tango	"Tango D'Amour" — Vicky Leandros	Safe
Chris & Trenton	33 (7, 8, 9, 9)	Tango	"Jealousy" — Billy Fury	Safe

=== Week 4 ===
Musical guest: Craig David

Couples performed either the foxtrot or the paso doble, and are listed in the order they performed.

Couple	Scores	Dance	Music	Result
Chris & Trenton	31 (7, 8, 8, 8)	Paso doble	"El gato montés" — Manuel Penella	Safe
Dawn & Gordon	17 (4, 5, 4, 4)	Paso doble	"España cañí" — Erich Kunzel	Safe
Brodie & Alana	25 (6, 6, 7, 6)	Foxtrot	"The Pink Panther Theme" — Henry Mancini	Safe
Ada & Aric	29 (8, 7, 7, 7)	Foxtrot	"You're the Boss" — The Brian Setzer Orchestra, feat. Gwen Stefani	Safe
Dicko & Leanne	26 (7, 7, 6, 6)	Foxtrot	"It Had to Be You" — Harry Connick Jr.	Safe
Ky & Masha	25 (4, 6, 8, 7)	Paso doble	"Also sprach Zarathustra" — Richard Strauss & "Where Do You Go" — No Mercy	Eliminated
Nicky & Andrew	23 (6, 6, 6, 5)	Paso doble	"Eye of the Tiger" — Survivor	Safe
David & Luda	27 (6, 7, 7, 7)	Paso doble	"The Phantom of the Opera" — from The Phantom of the Opera	Bottom two

=== Week 5 ===
Couples performed the samba and are listed in the order they performed.

Couple	Scores	Dance	Music	Result
Chris & Trenton	31 (8, 8, 7, 8)	Samba	"Hot Hot Hot" — Buster Poindexter	Safe
David & Luda	29 (6, 7, 8, 8)	Samba	"Shake Your Bon-Bon" — Ricky Martin	Bottom two
Brodie & Alana	27 (7, 7, 6, 7)	Samba	"Iko Iko" — The Belle Stars	Safe
Dawn & Gordon	23 (5, 6, 6, 6)	Samba	"Macarena" — Los del Rio	Safe
Nicky & Andrew	20 (5, 5, 5, 5)	Samba	"Mas que Nada" — Sérgio Mendes	Eliminated
Ada & Aric	29 (8, 7, 7, 7)	Samba	"You'll Be Mine (Party Time)" — Gloria Estefan	Safe
Dicko & Leanne	24 (7, 5, 6, 6)	Samba	"Soul Bossa Nova" — Quincy Jones	Safe

=== Week 6 ===
Couples are listed in the order they performed.

Couple	Scores	Dance	Music	Result
Chris & Trenton	31 (7, 8, 8, 8)	Cha-cha-cha	"Blame It on the Boogie" — Jackson 5	Safe
Dicko & Leanne	32 (8, 8, 8, 8)	Waltz	"Moon River" — Henry Mancini	Safe
David & Luda	28 (6, 7, 8, 7)	Quickstep	"Top Hat, White Tie and Tails" — Fred Astaire	Bottom two
Dawn & Gordon	21 (5, 5, 6, 5)	Foxtrot	"Beyond The Sea" — Robbie Williams	Eliminated
Brodie & Alana	23 (5, 6, 6, 6)	Rumba	"Alta marea" — Patrizio Buanne	Safe
Ada & Aric	31 (7, 8, 8, 8)	Tango	"Tango Passion" — Vio Friedmann	Safe

=== Week 7 ===
Musical guest: Jimmy Barnes

Couples are listed in the order they performed.

Couple	Scores	Dance	Music	Result
Dicko & Leanne	29 (7, 7, 7, 8)	Rumba	"Light My Fire" — José Feliciano	Safe
Brodie & Alana	28 (7, 7, 7, 7)	Waltz	"Until It's Time for You to Go" — Buffy Sainte-Marie	Safe
David & Luda	24 (5, 6, 6, 7)	Cha-cha-cha	"Ain't No Mountain High Enough" — Jimmy Barnes	Eliminated
Chris & Trenton	33 (8, 8, 8, 9)	Foxtrot	"Nobody But Me" — Lou Rawls	Safe
Ada & Aric	34 (9, 8, 9, 8)	Paso doble	"Malagueña" — Brian Setzer	Safe

=== Week 8 ===
Each couple performed one new routine, and then all couples participated in a group Viennese waltz for individual points. Couples are listed in the order they performed.

Brodie Holland's two dances had been pre-recorded the previous week, due to a prior sporting commitment in Arizona. A tango and jive were also recorded on the same night, to be aired in week 9 had he not been eliminated.

Couple	Scores	Dance	Music	Result
Chris & Trenton	29 (6, 7, 8, 8)	Jive	"Hey Dolly" — Louis Armstrong	Safe
Brodie & Alana	18 (6, 5, 4, 3)	Paso doble	"Don't Let Me Be Misunderstood" — The Animals	Eliminated
Ada & Aric	32 (8, 8, 8, 8)	Waltz	"If I Were A Painting" — Kenny Rogers	Safe
Dicko & Leanne	35 (9, 8, 9, 9)	Tango	"James Bond Theme" — John Barry & Orchestra	Safe
Chris & Trenton	29 (5, 8, 8, 8)	Group; Viennese waltz	"Kiss from a Rose" — Seal	
Brodie & Alana	20 (3, 6, 6, 5)	Group; Viennese waltz	"Kiss from a Rose" — Seal	
Ada & Aric	24 (5, 6, 6, 7)	Group; Viennese waltz	"Kiss from a Rose" — Seal	
Dicko & Leanne	27 (7, 6, 7, 7 )	Group; Viennese waltz	"Kiss from a Rose" — Seal	

=== Week 9 ===
Each couple performed two routines, and are listed in the order they performed.

Couple	Scores	Dance	Music	Result
Dicko & Leanne	26 (6, 6, 7, 7)	Paso doble	"Bohemian Rhapsody" — Queen	Eliminated
Dicko & Leanne	37 (8, 9, 10, 10)	Waltz	"Mull of Kintyre" — Paul McCartney and Wings	Eliminated
Chris & Trenton	28 (6, 7, 8, 7)	Quickstep	"Sing, Sing, Sing" — Benny Goodman	Bottom two
Chris & Trenton	40 (10, 10, 10, 10)	Rumba	"You'll Never Find Another Love like Mine" — Lou Rawls	Bottom two
Ada & Aric	30 (8, 7, 7, 8)	Rumba	"I Finally Found Someone" — Bryan Adams	Safe
Ada & Aric	35 (9, 8, 9, 9)	Jive	"Jump, Jive an' Wail" — Louis Prima	Safe

=== Week 10 ===
Musical guests: Human Nature & John Farnham

Each couple performed three routines: their favourite ballroom dance, favourite Latin dance, and their freestyle routine. Couples are listed in the order they performed.

Couple	Scores	Dance	Music	Result
Chris & Trenton	32 (8, 8, 8, 8)	Samba	"Hot Hot Hot" — Buster Poindexter	Runners-up
Chris & Trenton	34 (7, 9, 9, 9)	Waltz	"Weekend in New England" — Barry Manilow	Runners-up
Chris & Trenton	40 (10, 10, 10, 10)	Freestyle	"TNT" — AC/DC & "Sex Bomb" — Tom Jones	Runners-up
Ada & Aric	36 (9, 9, 9, 9)	Paso doble	"Malagueña" — Brian Setzer	Winners
Ada & Aric	33 (9, 8, 8, 8)	Waltz	"If I Were A Painting" — Kenny Rogers	Winners
Ada & Aric	34 (9, 9, 9, 7)	Freestyle	"Billie Jean" & "Smooth Criminal" — Michael Jackson	Winners

== Dance chart ==
The couples performed the following each week:

- Week 1: One unlearned dance (Cha-cha-cha or waltz)
- Week 2: One unlearned dance (Quickstep or rumba)
- Week 3: One unlearned dance (Jive or tango)
- Week 4: One unlearned dance (Foxtrot or paso doble)
- Week 5: Samba
- Weeks 6–7: One unlearned dance
- Week 8: One unlearned dance & group Viennese waltz
- Week 9: One unlearned dance & favourite dance of the season
- Week 10: Two favourite dances of the season & freestyle

Dancing with the Stars (season 3) - Dance chart
Couple	Week													
Couple	1	2	3	4	5	6	7	8		9		10		
Ada & Aric	Cha-cha-cha	Quickstep	Jive	Foxtrot	Samba	Tango	Paso doble	Waltz	Group; Viennese waltz	Rumba	Jive	Jive	Waltz	Freestyle
Chris & Trenton	Waltz	Rumba	Tango	Paso doble	Samba	Cha-cha-cha	Foxtrot	Jive	Group; Viennese waltz	Quickstep	Rumba	Paso doble	Tango	Freestyle
Dicko & Leanne	Cha-cha-cha	Quickstep	Jive	Foxtrot	Samba	Waltz	Rumba	Tango	Group; Viennese waltz	Paso doble	Waltz			
Brodie & Alana	Cha-cha-cha	Quickstep	Jive	Foxtrot	Samba	Rumba	Waltz	Paso doble	Group; Viennese waltz					
David & Luda	Waltz	Rumba	Tango	Paso doble	Samba	Quickstep	Cha-cha-cha							
Dawn & Gordon	Waltz	Rumba	Tango	Paso doble	Samba	Foxtrot								
Nicky & Andrew	Waltz	Rumba	Tango	Paso doble	Samba									
Ky & Masha	Waltz	Rumba	Tango	Paso doble										
Michael & Kym	Cha-cha-cha	Quickstep	Jive											
Tania & Michael	Cha-cha-cha	Quickstep												

Preceded by Dancing with the Stars (Australian season 2)	Dancing with the Stars (Australian version); Season 3	Succeeded by Dancing with the Stars (Australian season 4)
