= Dancing with the Stars (Australian TV series) season 2 =

Dancing with the Stars
- Season 2
- Hosted by: Daryl Somers; Sonia Kruger
- Judges: Todd McKenney; Paul Mercurio; Helen Richey; Mark Wilson
- Celebrity winner: Tom Williams
- Professional winner: Kym Johnson
- No. of episodes: 10

Release
- Original network: Seven Network
- Original release: 8 February – 26 April 2005

Season chronology
- ← Previous; Season 1 Next → Season 3

The second season of the Australian Dancing with the Stars premiered on 8 February 2005. Daryl Somers and Sonia Kruger returned as hosts, while Todd McKenney, Paul Mercurio, Helen Richey, and Mark Wilson returned as judges.

The Great Outdoors presenter Tom Williams and Kym Johnson were announced as the winners on 26 April 2005, while NRL player Ian Roberts and Natalie Lowe finished in second place.

== Couples ==
This season featured ten celebrity contestants.

| Celebrity | Notability | Professional partner | Status |
|---|---|---|---|
| Steven Bradbury | Olympic speed skater | Sarah West | Eliminated 1st on 15 February 2005 |
| Sara-Marie Fedele | Big Brother housemate | Trent Whiddon | Eliminated 2nd on 22 February 2005 |
| Shane Gould | Olympic swimmer | Csaba Szirmai | Eliminated 3rd on 1 March 2005 |
| Suzie Wilks | Television presenter | Jonathan Doone | Eliminated 4th on 8 March 2005 |
| Nikki Webster | Singer | Sasha Farber | Eliminated 5th on 15 March 2005 |
| Derryn Hinch | Radio personality | Patrice Smith | Eliminated 6th on 5 April 2005 |
| Jason Smith | Home and Away actor | Luda Kroitor | Eliminated 7th on 12 April 2005 |
| Holly Brisley | Actress | Mark Hodge | Eliminated 8th on 19 April 2005 |
| Ian Roberts | NRL player | Natalie Lowe | Runners-up on 26 April 2005 |
| Tom Williams | Television presenter | Kym Johnson | Winners on 26 April 2005 |

== Scoring chart ==
The highest score each week is indicated in bold green with a dagger (†), while the lowest score each week is indicated in italicized red with a double-dagger (‡).

Color key:

Winners
Runners-up
Bottom two
Eliminated

Dancing with the Stars (season 2) - Weekly scores
| Couple | Pl. | Week | | | | | | | | | | |
| Couple | Pl. | 1 | 2 | 1+2 | 3 | 4 | 5 | 6 | 7 | 8 | 9 | 10 |
|---|---|---|---|---|---|---|---|---|---|---|---|---|
| Tom & Kym | 1st | 25 | **31**† | **56**† | 32 | 25 | **29**† | **31**† | **36**† | 29+23=52 | 36+34=**70**† | 34+35+40=**109**† (Note: This couple finished in first place.) |
| Ian & Natalie | 2nd | 24 | 18 | 42 | 23 | 22 | 18‡ (Note: This couple was in the bottom two, but was not eliminated.) | 20‡ | 21 | 19+21=40‡ | 22+27=49‡ | 28+29+37=94‡ (Note: This couple finished in second place.) |
| Holly & Mark | 3rd | 23 | **31**† | 54 | 29 | **30**† | **29**† | 29 | 31 | 30+26=**56**† | 32+37=69 (Note: This couple was eliminated.) | |
| Jason & Luda | 4th | 21 | 19 | 40 | 23 | 13‡ | 25 | 24 | 24 | 26+20=46 | | |
| Derryn & Patrice | 5th | 17‡ | 16‡ | 33‡ | 21‡ | 14 | 27 | 20‡ | 9‡ | | | |
| Nikki & Sasha | 6th | **28**† | 27 | 55 | **33**† | 29 | 24 | 20‡ | | | | |
| Suzie & Jonathan | 7th | 18 | 27 | 45 | 27 | 26 | 23 | | | | | |
| Shane & Csaba | 8th | 23 | 25 | 48 | 27 | 24 | | | | | | |
| Sara-Marie & Trent | 9th | 19 | 19 | 38 | 24 | | | | | | | |
| Steven & Sarah | 10th | 19 | 22 | 41 | | | | | | | | |

== Weekly scores ==
=== Week 1 ===
Couples performed either the cha-cha-cha or the waltz, and are listed in the order they performed.

| Couple | Scores | Dance | Music |
|---|---|---|---|
| Nikki & Sasha | 28 | Cha-cha-cha | "She's a Lady" — Tom Jones |
| Ian & Natalie | 24 | Waltz | "Love Ain't Here Anymore" — Take That |
| Jason & Luda | 21 | Cha-cha-cha | "Rollover DJ" — Jet |
| Derryn & Patrice | 17 | Waltz | "Take It to the Limit" — Eagles |
| Sara-Marie & Trent | 19 | Cha-cha-cha | "Think" — Aretha Franklin |
| Steven & Sarah | 19 (3, 6, 6, 5) | Waltz | "It Is You (I Have Loved)" — Dana Glover |
| Tom & Kym | 25 | Cha-cha-cha | "Car Wash" — Christina Aguilera & Missy Elliott |
| Suzie & Jonathan | 18 (4, 5, 4, 5) | Waltz | "When I Need You" — Leo Sayer |
| Holly & Mark | 23 | Cha-cha-cha | "Tilt Ya Head Back" — Christina Aguilera & Nelly |
| Shane & Csaba | 23 | Waltz | "You Light Up My Life" — Whitney Houston |

=== Week 2 ===
Couples performed either the quickstep or the rumba, and are listed in the order they performed.

| Couple | Scores | Dance | Music | Result |
|---|---|---|---|---|
| Sara-Marie & Trent | 19 | Quickstep | "Diamonds Are a Girl's Best Friend" — Marilyn Monroe | Bottom two |
| Steven & Sarah | 22 | Rumba | "When You Say Nothing at All" — Ronan Keating | Eliminated |
| Derryn & Patrice | 16 | Rumba | "Angels" — Robbie Williams | Safe |
| Holly & Mark | 31 | Quickstep | Chicago medley — from Chicago | Safe |
| Suzie & Jonathan | 27 | Rumba | "In the Air Tonight" — Phil Collins | Safe |
| Tom & Kym | 31 | Quickstep | "We Are in Love" — Harry Connick Jr. | Safe |
| Ian & Natalie | 18 | Rumba | "I Just Can't Stop Loving You" — Michael Jackson & Siedah Garrett | Safe |
| Jason & Luda | 19 | Quickstep | "Spiderman Theme" — Michael Bublé | Safe |
| Nikki & Sasha | 27 | Quickstep | "Stop it I Like It" — Rick Guard | Safe |
| Shane & Csaba | 25 | Rumba | "Burn for You" — John Farnham | Safe |

=== Week 3 ===
Couples performed either the jive or the tango, and are listed in the order they performed.

| Couple | Scores | Dance | Music | Result |
|---|---|---|---|---|
| Ian & Natalie | 23 | Tango | "Toxic" — Britney Spears | Safe |
| Nikki & Sasha | 33 | Jive | "Hanky Panky" — Madonna | Safe |
| Derryn & Patrice | 21 | Tango | "Cell Block Tango" — from Chicago | Safe |
| Sara-Marie & Trent | 24 | Jive | "Are You Gonna Be My Girl" — Jet | Eliminated |
| Tom & Kym | 32 | Jive | "Shake a Tail Feather" — The Blues Brothers | Safe |
| Suzie & Jonathan | 27 | Tango | "Santa Maria" — Gotan Project | Bottom two |
| Jason & Luda | 23 | Jive | "Footloose" — Kenny Loggins | Safe |
| Holly & Mark | 29 | Jive | "Would You...?" — Touch and Go | Safe |
| Shane & Csaba | 27 | Tango | "Carmen Tango" — Georges Bizet | Safe |

=== Week 4 ===
Couples performed either the foxtrot or the paso doble, and are listed in the order they performed.

| Couple | Scores | Dance | Music | Result |
|---|---|---|---|---|
| Ian & Natalie | 22 | Paso doble | "Theme from Gladiator" — Hans Zimmer | Safe |
| Jason & Luda | 13 (4, 4, 1, 4) | Foxtrot | "Sunday Morning" — Maroon 5 | Bottom two |
| Derryn & Patrice | 14 | Paso doble | "España cañí" — Erich Kunzel | Safe |
| Holly & Mark | 30 | Foxtrot | "Come Fly with Me" — Michael Bublé | Safe |
| Tom & Kym | 25 | Foxtrot | "For Once in My Life" — Michael Bublé | Safe |
| Nikki & Sasha | 29 | Foxtrot | "Moondance" — Michael Bublé | Safe |
| Shane & Csaba | 24 | Paso doble | "Concierto de Aranjuez" — Joaquín Rodrigo | Eliminated |
| Suzie & Jonathan | 26 | Paso doble | "Allegretto" — Bond | Safe |

=== Week 5 ===
Couples performed the samba and are listed in the order they performed.

| Couple | Scores | Dance | Music | Result |
|---|---|---|---|---|
| Ian & Natalie | 18 | Samba | "It's Not Unusual" — Tom Jones | Bottom two |
| Jason & Luda | 25 | Samba | "Kiss Kiss" — Holly Valance | Safe |
| Holly & Mark | 29 | Samba | "Edmundo (In the Mood)" — Elza Soares | Safe |
| Derryn & Patrice | 27 | Samba | "I Go to Rio" — Peter Allen | Safe |
| Tom & Kym | 29 | Samba | "Hey Mama" — Black Eyed Peas | Safe |
| Nikki & Sasha | 24 | Samba | "Maria" — Ricky Martin | Safe |
| Suzie & Jonathan | 23 (6, 6, 6, 5) | Samba | "Cherry, Cherry" — Neil Diamond | Eliminated |

=== Week 6 ===
Couples are listed in the order they performed.

| Couple | Scores | Dance | Music | Result |
|---|---|---|---|---|
| Tom & Kym | 31 | Waltz | "I Wonder Why" — Curtis Stigers | Safe |
| Derryn & Patrice | 20 | Quickstep | "Dancin' Fool" — from Copacabana | Bottom two |
| Holly & Mark | 29 | Rumba | "Ain't No Sunshine" — Bill Withers | Safe |
| Nikki & Sasha | 20 (1, 6, 7, 6) | Tango | "Ride It" — Geri Halliwell | Eliminated |
| Ian & Natalie | 20 | Jive | "Runaround Sue" — Dion | Safe |
| Jason & Luda | 24 | Paso doble | "Carmina Burana" — Carl Orff | Safe |

=== Week 7 ===
Couples are listed in the order they performed.

| Couple | Scores | Dance | Music | Result |
|---|---|---|---|---|
| Jason & Luda | 24 (6, 6, 5, 7) | Waltz | "Only One Road" — Celine Dion | Safe |
| Holly & Mark | 31 (7, 8, 8, 8) | Tango | "Libertango" — Bond | Safe |
| Ian & Natalie | 21 (5, 5, 5, 6) | Quickstep | "Puttin' On the Ritz" — Irving Berlin | Bottom two |
| Tom & Kym | 36 (9, 9, 9, 9) | Rumba | "Sweetest Sin" — Jessica Simpson | Safe |
| Derryn & Patrice | 9 (2, 3, 2, 2) | Cha-cha-cha | "A Little Less Conversation" — Elvis Presley vs. JXL | Eliminated |

=== Week 8 ===
Musical guest: Guy Sebastian

Each couple performed one new routine, and then all couples participated in a group Viennese waltz for individual points. Couples are listed in the order they performed.

| Couple | Scores | Dance | Music | Result |
|---|---|---|---|---|
| Ian & Natalie | 19 (5, 5, 4, 5) | Cha-cha-cha | "It's Raining Men" — Geri Halliwell | Bottom two |
| Tom & Kym | 29 (7, 7, 8, 7) | Tango | "Whatever Lola Wants" — Gotan Project | Safe |
| Jason & Luda | 26 (5, 6, 7, 8) | Rumba | "Sweetest Berry" — Guy Sebastian | Eliminated |
| Holly & Mark | 30 (7, 8, 7, 8) | Paso doble | "Malagueña" — Connie Francis | Safe |
| Ian & Natalie | 21 (5, 5, 5, 6) | Group; Viennese waltz | "Fallin'" — Alicia Keys | |
| Tom & Kym | 23 (6, 5, 6, 6) | Group; Viennese waltz | "Fallin'" — Alicia Keys | |
| Jason & Luda | 20 (5, 5, 5, 5) | Group; Viennese waltz | "Fallin'" — Alicia Keys | |
| Holly & Mark | 26 (7, 6, 6, 7) | Group; Viennese waltz | "Fallin'" — Alicia Keys | |

=== Week 9 ===
Each couple performed two routines, and are listed in the order they performed.

| Couple | Scores | Dance | Music | Result |
|---|---|---|---|---|
| Holly & Mark | 32 (8, 8, 8, 8) | Waltz | "Springtime Ballet" — from Bilitis | Eliminated |
| Holly & Mark | 37 (9, 9, 9, 10) | Cha-cha-cha | "September" — Earth, Wind & Fire | Eliminated |
| Ian & Natalie | 22 (5, 5, 6, 6) | Foxtrot | "Wade in the Water" — Eva Cassidy | Bottom two |
| Ian & Natalie | 27 (6, 7, 7, 7) | Rumba | "Walk On By" — Dionne Warwick | Bottom two |
| Tom & Kym | 36 (9, 9, 9, 9) | Paso Doble | | Safe |
| Tom & Kym | 34 (9, 8, 9, 8) | Samba | "(I've Had) The Time of My Life" — Bill Medley & Jennifer Warnes | Safe |

=== Week 10 ===
Musical guest: Anthony Callea

Each couple performed three routines: their favourite ballroom dance, their favourite Latin dance, and their freestyle routine. Couples are listed in the order they performed.

| Couple | Scores | Dance | Music | Result |
|---|---|---|---|---|
| Tom & Kym | 34 (8, 9, 9, 8) | Quickstep | "We Are in Love" — Harry Connick Jr. | Winners |
| Tom & Kym | 35 (9, 8, 9, 9) | Jive | "Shake a Tail Feather" — The Blues Brothers | Winners |
| Tom & Kym | 40 (10, 10, 10, 10) | Freestyle | "You Can Leave Your Hat On" — Joe Cocker & "Kiss" — Tom Jones | Winners |
| Ian & Natalie | 28 (7, 7, 7, 7) | Quickstep | "Puttin' On the Ritz" — Irving Berlin | Runners-up |
| Ian & Natalie | 29 (7, 7, 8, 7) | Jive | "Runaround Sue" — Dion | Runners-up |
| Ian & Natalie | 37 (9, 9, 10, 9) | Freestyle | "Three Times a Lady" — Commodores & "Last Dance" — Donna Summer | Runners-up |

== Dance chart ==
The couples performed the following each week:

- Week 1: One unlearned dance (Cha-cha-cha or waltz)
- Week 2: One unlearned dance (Quickstep or rumba)
- Week 3: One unlearned dance (Jive or tango)
- Week 4: One unlearned dance (Foxtrot or paso doble)
- Week 5: Samba
- Weeks 6–7: One unlearned dance
- Week 8: One unlearned dance & group Viennese waltz
- Week 9: One unlearned dance & favourite dance of the season
- Week 10: Two favourite dances of the season & freestyle

Dancing with the Stars (season 2) - Dance chart
| Couple | Week | | | | | | | | | | | | | |
| Couple | 1 | 2 | 3 | 4 | 5 | 6 | 7 | 8 | | 9 | | 10 | | |
|---|---|---|---|---|---|---|---|---|---|---|---|---|---|---|
| Tom & Kym | Cha-cha-cha | Quickstep | Jive | Foxtrot | Samba | Waltz | Rumba | Tango | Group; Viennese waltz | Paso Doble | Samba | Quickstep | Jive | Freestyle |
| Ian & Natalie | Waltz | Rumba | Tango | Paso doble | Samba | Jive | Quickstep | Cha-cha-cha | Group; Viennese waltz | Foxtrot | Rumba | Quickstep | Jive | Freestyle |
| Holly & Mark | Cha-cha-cha | Quickstep | Jive | Foxtrot | Samba | Rumba | Tango | Paso doble | Group; Viennese waltz | Waltz | Cha-cha-cha | | | |
| Jason & Luda | Cha-cha-cha | Quickstep | Jive | Foxtrot | Samba | Paso doble | Waltz | Rumba | Group; Viennese waltz | | | | | |
| Derryn & Patrice | Waltz | Rumba | Tango | Paso doble | Samba | Quickstep | Cha-cha-cha | | | | | | | |
| Nikki & Sasha | Cha-cha-cha | Quickstep | Jive | Foxtrot | Samba | Tango | | | | | | | | |
| Suzie & Jonathan | Waltz | Rumba | Tango | Paso doble | Samba | | | | | | | | | |
| Shane & Csaba | Waltz | Rumba | Tango | Paso doble | | | | | | | | | | |
| Sara-Marie & Trent | Cha-cha-cha | Quickstep | Jive | | | | | | | | | | | |
| Steven & Sarah | Waltz | Rumba | | | | | | | | | | | | |

| Preceded by Dancing with the Stars (Australian season 1) | Dancing with the Stars (Australian version); Season 2 | Succeeded by Dancing with the Stars (Australian season 3) |
