= Dancing with the Stars (Australian TV series) season 14 =

Dancing with the Stars
- Season 14
- Hosted by: Daniel McPherson; Edwina Bartholomew
- Judges: Adam Garcia; Kym Johnson; Todd McKenney; Helen Richey
- Celebrity winner: David Rodan
- Professional winner: Melanie Hooper
- No. of episodes: 10

Release
- Original network: Seven Network
- Original release: 30 September – 25 November 2014

Season chronology
- ← Previous; Season 13 Next → Season 15

The fourteenth season of Dancing with the Stars debuted on 30 September 2014. Daniel McPherson and Edwina Bartholomew returned as hosts, while Adam Garcia, Kym Johnson, Todd McKenney, and Helen Richey returned as judges.

Former AFL player David Rodan and Melanie Hooper were announced as the winners on 25 November, while Home and Away actress Lynne McGranger and Carmelo Pizzino finished in second place, and singer Ricki-Lee Coulter and Jarryd Byrne finished in third.

== Couples ==
This season featured eleven celebrity contestants. The cast was announced on 28 August. Actor Paul Fenech was originally part of the cast, but withdrew after he was arrested in September.

Celebrity	Notability	Professional partner	Status
Ashley Hart	Model	Julz Tocker	Eliminated 1st on 7 October 2014
April Rose Pengilly	Actress & model	Aric Yegudkin	Eliminated 2nd on 14 October 2014
Kyly Clarke	Model	Damian Whitewood	Withdrew on 14 October 2014
Mark Holden	Singer	Jessica Prince	Eliminated 3rd on 21 October 2014
Eamon Sullivan	Olympic swimmer	Ash-Leigh Hunter; Melanie Hooper (Week 5)	Eliminated 4th on 30 October 2014
Torah Bright	Olympic snowboarder	Robbie Kmetoni; Jarryd Byrne (Week 5)	Withdrew on 4 November 2014
Matt Cooper	NRL player	Masha Belash; Ash-Leigh Hunter (Week 5)	Eliminated 5th on 11 November 2014
Tai Hara	Home and Away actor	Jorja Freeman; Masha Belash (Week 5)	Eliminated 6th on 18 November 2014
Ricki-Lee Coulter	Singer-songwriter	Jarryd Byrne; Carmelo Pizzino (Week 5)	Third place on 25 November 2014
Lynne McGranger	Home and Away actress	Carmelo Pizzino; Robbie Kmetoni (Week 5)	Runners-up on 25 November 2014
David Rodan	AFL player	Melanie Hooper; Jorja Freeman (week 5)	Winners on 25 November 2014

== Scoring chart ==
The highest score each week is indicated in bold green with a dagger (†), while the lowest score each week is indicated in italicized red with a double-dagger (‡).

Color key:

Winners
Runners-up
Third place
Bottom two
Withdrew from competition
Eliminated

Dancing with the Stars (season 14) - Weekly scores
Couple	Pl.	Week												
Couple	Pl.	1	2	1+2	3	4	5	6	5+6	7	8	7+8	9	10
David & Melanie	1st	34	28	62	33	**36**†	**38**†	33+10=43	**81**†	36+35=**71**†	33+28=61‡	132	30+40=**70**†	40+40+40=**120**† (Note: This couple finished in first place.)
Lynne & Carmelo	2nd	29	30	59	32	25	29	28+5=33	62	30+32=62	29+32=61‡	123‡	28+35=63‡	36+38+36=110‡ (Note: This couple finished in second place.)
Ricki-Lee & Jarryd	3rd	31	34	65	30	33	32	36+8=**44**†	76	33+35=68	36+37=73	**141**†	27+37=64	40+38=78 (Note: This couple finished in third place.)
Tai & Jorja	4th	32	23	55	23	22 (Note: This couple was in the bottom two, but was not eliminated.)	32	35+9=**44**†	76	26+32=58	35+34=69	127	29+36=65 (Note: This couple was eliminated.)	
Matt & Masha	5th	28	27	55	32	29	32	32+7=39	71	24+32=56‡	38+37=**75**†	131		
Torah & Robbie	6th	15‡	**35**†	50	21	33	30	31+6=37	67	(Note: This couple withdrew from the competition.)				
Eamon & Ash-Leigh	7th	29	32	61	**35**†	28	26‡	27+4=31‡	57‡					
Mark & Jessica	8th	19	17‡	36‡	4‡	12‡								
Kyly & Damian	9th	**35**†	34	**69**†										
April & Aric	10th	32	30	62	29									
Ashley & Julz	11th	28	23	51										

== Weekly scores ==
Individual judges scores in the charts below (given in parentheses) are listed in this order from left to right: Todd McKenney, Helen Richey, Kym Johnson, Adam Garcia.

=== Week 1 ===
Couples are listed in the order they performed.

Couple	Scores	Dance	Music
Ashley & Julz	28 (7, 7, 7, 7)	Cha-cha-cha	"I Will Never Let You Down" — Rita Ora
Eamon & Ash-Leigh	29 (6, 8, 7, 8)	Foxtrot	"Story of My Life" — One Direction
Kyly & Damian	35 (9, 9, 9, 8)	Contemporary	"Read All About It" — Emeli Sande
David & Melanie	34 (9, 8, 8, 9)	Cha-cha-cha	"Everybody" — Justice Crew
Lynne & Carmelo	29 (7, 7, 7, 8)	Viennese waltz	"It's a Man's Man's Man's World" — James Brown
Matt & Masha	28 (6, 7, 8, 7)	Cha-cha-cha	"Timber" — Pitbull, feat. Kesha
Mark & Jessica	19 (2, 6, 6, 5)	Foxtrot	"You Make Me Feel So Young" — Frank Sinatra
April & Aric	32 (8, 8, 8, 8)	Viennese waltz	"Say Something" — A Great Big World, feat. Christina Aguilera
Torah & Robbie	15 (1, 3, 5, 6)	Foxtrot	"Rather Be" — Clean Bandit, feat. Jess Glynne
Tai & Jorja	32 (8, 8, 8, 8)	Contemporary	"All of Me" — John Legend
Ricki-Lee & Jarryd	31 (7, 8, 8, 8)	Cha-cha-cha	"Move" — Little Mix

=== Week 2 ===
Couples are listed in the order they performed.

Couple	Scores	Dance	Music	Result
David & Melanie	28 (7, 7, 7, 7)	Samba	"I Want You Back" — The Jackson 5	Safe
Matt & Masha	27 (6, 7, 7, 7)	Waltz	"Let It Go" — Idina Menzel	Safe
April & Aric	30 (7, 7, 8, 8)	Samba	"Bamboleo" — Gipsy Kings	Safe
Mark & Jessica	17 (3, 5, 5, 4)	Viennese waltz	"She's Leaving Home" — The Beatles	Bottom two
Lynne & Carmelo	30 (8, 8, 7, 7)	Jive	"Shake a Tail Feather" — Ray Charles	Safe
Kyly & Damian	34 (7, 9, 9, 9)	Waltz	"You Raise Me Up" – Josh Groban	Safe
Ashley & Julz	23 (5, 6, 6, 6)	Salsa	"(I've Had) The Time of My Life" — Bill Medley & Jennifer Warnes	Eliminated
Eamon & Ash-Leigh	32 (8, 8, 8, 8)	Paso doble	"The Pretender" — Foo Fighters	Safe
Ricki-Lee & Jarryd	34 (8, 8, 9, 9)	Contemporary	"One Sweet Day" — Mariah Carey & Boyz II Men	Safe
Tai & Jorja	23 (5, 6, 6, 6)	Foxtrot	"Keep it Loose, Keep it Tight" — Amos Lee	Safe
Torah & Robbie	35 (9, 8, 9, 9)	Contemporary	"Roar" — Katy Perry	Safe

=== Week 3 ===
Couples are listed in the order they performed.

Couple	Scores	Dance	Music	Result
Matt & Masha	32 (8, 8, 8, 8)	Tango	"Love Runs Out" — OneRepublic	Safe
Eamon & Ash-Leigh	35 (9, 9, 8, 9)	Quickstep	"Puttin' On the Ritz" — Irving Berlin	Safe
April & Aric	29 (7, 7, 7, 8)	Rumba	"You Ruin Me" — The Veronicas	Eliminated
David & Melanie	33 (7, 9, 9, 8)	Viennese waltz	"If I Knew" — Bruno Mars	Safe
Tai & Jorja	23 (5, 6, 6, 6)	Jive	"Don't Stop" — 5 Seconds of Summer	Safe
Mark & Jessica	4 (1, 1, 1, 1)	Jazz	"House of Fun" — Madness	Safe
Torah & Robbie	21 (5, 5, 6, 5)	Samba	"Problem" — Ariana Grande, feat. Iggy Azalea	Bottom two
Ricki-Lee & Jarryd	30 (7, 8, 8, 7)	Rumba	"Halo" — Beyoncé	Safe
Lynne & Carmelo	32 (8, 8, 8, 8)	Tango	"Addicted to You" — Avicii	Safe

=== Week 4 ===
Couples are listed in the order they performed.

Couple	Scores	Dance	Music	Result
David & Melanie	36 (9, 9, 9, 9)	Quickstep	"Let's Go Crazy" — Prince & The Revolution	Safe
Matt & Masha	29 (6, 7, 8, 8)	Salsa	"U Can't Touch This" — MC Hammer	Safe
Eamon & Ash-Leigh	28 (7, 8, 7, 6)	Tango	"Rock and Roll All Nite" — Kiss	Safe
Torah & Robbie	33 (9, 8, 8, 8)	Jive	"Shake It Off" — Taylor Swift	Safe
Lynne & Carmelo	25 (6, 6, 6, 7)	Cha-cha-cha	"It's My Party" — Jessie J	Safe
Tai & Jorja	22 (4, 6, 6, 6)	Cha-cha-cha	"Party Rock Anthem" — LMFAO	Bottom two
Mark & Jessica	12 (1, 3, 3, 5)	Paso doble	"Highway To Hell" — AC/DC	Eliminated
Ricki-Lee & Jarryd	33 (8, 8, 8, 9)	Foxtrot	"Time After Time" — Cyndi Lauper	Safe

=== Week 5 ===
Couples are listed in the order they performed.

Couple	Scores	Dance	Music
Tai & Masha	32 (8, 8, 8, 8)	Paso doble	"My Songs Know What You Did in the Dark (Light Em Up)" — Fall Out Boy
Torah & Jarryd	30 (7, 7, 8, 8)	Viennese waltz	"The Only Exception" — Paramore
Eamon & Melanie	26 (5, 7, 7, 7)	Jive	"Dance with Me Tonight" — Olly Murs
Matt & Ash-Leigh	32 (9, 8, 8, 7)	Foxtrot	"Moondance" — Van Morrison
David & Jorja	38 (10, 9, 9, 10)	Rumba	"Thinking Out Loud" — Ed Sheeran
Ricki-Lee & Carmelo	32 (8, 8, 8, 8)	Jive	"Another Man" — Itch, feat. Megan Joy
Lynne & Robbie	29 (7, 7, 7, 8)	Foxtrot	"Dark Paradise" — Lana Del Rey

Couples performed one unlearned dance style with a different partner selected by the general public; no elimination took place.

=== Week 6 ===
Couples are listed in the order they performed.

Couple	Scores	Dance	Music	Result
Ricki-Lee & Jarryd	36 (9, 9, 9, 9)	Paso doble	"Thriller" — Michael Jackson	Safe
David & Melanie	33 (9, 8, 8, 8)	Tango	"Black Widow" — Iggy Azalea, feat. Rita Ora	Safe
Eamon & Ash-Leigh	27 (6, 7, 7, 7)	Samba	"Fun House" — Pink	Eliminated
Matt & Masha	32 (8, 8, 8, 8)	Paso doble	"Sympathy for the Devil" — The Rolling Stones	Safe
Tai & Jorja	35 (9, 8, 9, 9)	Tango	"Little Drop of Poison" — Tom Waits	Safe
Lynne & Carmelo	28 (7, 7, 7, 7)	Quickstep	"That Old Black Magic" — Frank Sinatra	Safe
Torah & Robbie	31 (8, 7, 8, 8)	Paso doble	"Bring Me to Life" — Evanescence	Bottom two
Eamon & Ash-Leigh	4	Halloween; Marathon	"This is Halloween" — from The Nightmare Before Christmas, "Devil Gate Drive" — Suzi Quatro, "Monster Mash" — Bobby "Boris" Pickett & "The Time Warp" — from The Rocky Horror Picture Show	
Lynne & Carmelo	5	Halloween; Marathon	"This is Halloween" — from The Nightmare Before Christmas, "Devil Gate Drive" — Suzi Quatro, "Monster Mash" — Bobby "Boris" Pickett & "The Time Warp" — from The Rocky Horror Picture Show	
Torah & Robbie	6	Halloween; Marathon	"This is Halloween" — from The Nightmare Before Christmas, "Devil Gate Drive" — Suzi Quatro, "Monster Mash" — Bobby "Boris" Pickett & "The Time Warp" — from The Rocky Horror Picture Show	
Matt & Masha	7	Halloween; Marathon	"This is Halloween" — from The Nightmare Before Christmas, "Devil Gate Drive" — Suzi Quatro, "Monster Mash" — Bobby "Boris" Pickett & "The Time Warp" — from The Rocky Horror Picture Show	
Ricki-Lee & Jarryd	8	Halloween; Marathon	"This is Halloween" — from The Nightmare Before Christmas, "Devil Gate Drive" — Suzi Quatro, "Monster Mash" — Bobby "Boris" Pickett & "The Time Warp" — from The Rocky Horror Picture Show	
Tai & Jorja	9	Halloween; Marathon	"This is Halloween" — from The Nightmare Before Christmas, "Devil Gate Drive" — Suzi Quatro, "Monster Mash" — Bobby "Boris" Pickett & "The Time Warp" — from The Rocky Horror Picture Show	
David & Melanie	10	Halloween; Marathon	"This is Halloween" — from The Nightmare Before Christmas, "Devil Gate Drive" — Suzi Quatro, "Monster Mash" — Bobby "Boris" Pickett & "The Time Warp" — from The Rocky Horror Picture Show	

=== Week 7 ===
Due to Torah being injured, she was replaced by Ash-Leigh Hunter in the team dance. Because of Torah's injury, there was also no elimination this week.

Couples are listed in the order they performed.

Couple	Scores	Dance	Music
David & Melanie	36 (9, 9, 9, 9)	Jive	"Happy" — Pharrell Williams
Matt & Masha	24 (5, 6, 7, 6)	Rumba	"Impossible" — James Arthur
Tai & Jorja	26 (6, 6, 7, 7)	Viennese waltz	"Hallelujah" — Jeff Buckley
Lynne & Carmello	30 (7, 7, 8, 8)	Jazz	"Le Jazz Hot!" — from Victor/Victoria
Ricki-Lee & Jarryd	33 (8, 8, 8, 9)	Viennese waltz	"Fallin'" — Alicia Keys
Lynne & Carmello Matt & Masha Tai & Jorja	32 (8, 8, 8, 8)	Team Rock (Paso doble & Tango)	"Thunderstruck" — AC/DC
Ash-Leigh & Robbie David & Melanie Ricki-Lee & Jarryd	35 (8, 8, 10, 9)	Team Pop (Cha-cha-cha & Samba)	"Bom Bom" — Sam and the Womp

=== Week 8 ===
Couples are listed in the order they performed.

Couple	Scores	Dance	Music	Result
Tai & Jorja	35 (8, 10, 9, 8)	Paso doble	"Scott & Fran's Paso Doble" — from Strictly Ballroom	Safe
Tai & Jorja	34 (9, 8, 8, 9)	Rumba	"Stay with Me" — Sam Smith	Safe
Matt & Masha	38 (9, 10, 9, 10)	Foxtrot	"It's a Beautiful Day" — Michael Bublé	Eliminated
Matt & Masha	37 (9, 9, 10, 9)	Argentine tango	"Asi se Baila el Tango" — Veronica Verdier	Eliminated
David & Melanie	33 (8, 9, 8, 8)	Rumba	"Only Love Can Hurt Like This" — Paloma Faith	Safe
David & Melanie	28 (7, 7, 7, 7)	Foxtrot	"Ain't No Mountain High Enough"—Marvin Gaye & Tammi Terrell	Safe
Lynne & Carmelo	29 (7, 7, 7, 8)	Foxtrot	"You're the Boss" — Elvis Presley & Ann-Margret	Safe
Lynne & Carmelo	32 (8, 8, 8, 8)	Waltz	"Open Arms" — Mariah Carey	Safe
Ricki-Lee & Jarryd	36 (9, 9, 9, 9)	Jive	"Bang Bang" — Jessie J, Ariana Grande & Nicki Minaj	Safe
Ricki-Lee & Jarryd	37 (10, 9, 9, 9)	Tango	"Everybody Wants to Rule the World" — Lorde	Safe

=== Week 9 - Semifinals ===
Each semi-finalist was mentored by one of the four judges this week, and this judge was unable to score their corresponding couple in round one.

Couples are listed in the order they performed.

Couple	Mentor	Scores	Dance	Music	Result
Ricki-Lee & Jarryd	Kym Johnson	27 (9, 9, X, 9)	Quickstep	"Do Your Thing" — Basement Jaxx	Safe
Ricki-Lee & Jarryd	Kym Johnson	37 (9, 9, 10, 9)	Broadway	"Cinema Italiano" — Kate Hudson	Safe
Tai & Jorja	Helen Richey	29 (9, X, 10, 10)	Argentine tango	"El Sonido De La Milonga" — Campo	Eliminated
Tai & Jorja	Helen Richey	36 (9, 9, 9, 9)	Urban	"Talk Dirty" — Jason Derulo, feat. 2 Chainz	Eliminated
Lynne & Carmelo	Adam Garcia	28 (10, 9, 9, X)	Salsa	"Conga" — Gloria Estefan	Safe
Lynne & Carmelo	Adam Garcia	35 (8, 10, 9, 8)	Charleston	"Pencil Full of Lead" — Paolo Nutini	Safe
David & Melanie	Todd McKenney	30 (X, 10, 10, 10)	Contemporary	"Latch" — Sam Smith	Safe
David & Melanie	Todd McKenney	40 (10, 10, 10, 10)	Bollywood	"Ek Ajnabee" — Sunidhi Chauhan, Sukhwinder Singh & Vishal Dadlani	Safe

=== Week 10 - Grand Finale ===
Couples are listed in the order they performed.

Couple	Scores	Dance	Music	Result
Ricki-Lee & Jarryd	40 (10, 10, 10, 10)	Paso doble	"Malaguena" — Domingo DeGrazia	Third place
Ricki-Lee & Jarryd	38 (9, 10, 9, 10)	Freestyle	"Shot Me Down" — David Guetta, feat. Skylar Grey	Third place
David & Melanie	40 (10, 10, 10, 10)	Quickstep	"Jumpin' Jack" — Big Bad Voodoo Daddy	Winners
David & Melanie	40 (10, 10, 10, 10)	Freestyle	"P.Y.T. (Pretty Young Thing)" — Michael Jackson	Winners
David & Melanie	40 (10, 10, 10, 10)	Cha-cha-cha	"Everybody" — Justice Crew	Winners
Lynne & Carmelo	36 (9, 9, 9, 9)	Jazz	"I'm a Woman" — from Smokey Joe's Cafe	Runners-up
Lynne & Carmelo	38 (9, 9, 10, 10)	Freestyle	"I Just Wanna Dance" — Alison Jiear	Runners-up
Lynne & Carmelo	36 (9, 9, 9, 9)	Jive	"Shake a Tail Feather" — Ray Charles	Runners-up

== Dance chart ==
The couples performed the following each week:

- Weeks 1–5: One unlearned dance
- Week 6: One unlearned dance & dance marathon
- Week 7: One unlearned dance & team dance
- Week 8: Week 5 dance & one unlearned dance
- Week 9: Two unlearned dances
- Week 10: Audience's choice, judges' choice & freestyle

Dancing with the Stars (season 14) - Dance chart
Couple	Week															
Couple	1	2	3	4	5	6		7		8		9		10		
David & Melanie	Cha-cha-cha	Samba	Viennese waltz	Quickstep	Rumba	Tango	Halloween; Marathon	Jive	Team; Dance	Rumba	Foxtrot	Contemp.	Bollywood	Quickstep	Freestyle	Cha-cha-cha
Lynne & Carmelo	Viennese waltz	Jive	Tango	Cha-cha-cha	Foxtrot	Quickstep	Halloween; Marathon	Jazz	Team; Dance	Foxtrot	Waltz	Salsa	Charleston	Jazz	Freestyle	Jive
Ricki-Lee & Jarryd	Cha-cha-cha	Contemp.	Rumba	Foxtrot	Jive	Paso doble	Halloween; Marathon	Viennese waltz	Team; Dance	Jive	Tango	Quickstep	Broadway	Paso doble	Freestyle	
Tai & Jorja	Contemp.	Foxtrot	Jive	Cha-cha-cha	Paso doble	Tango	Halloween; Marathon	Viennese waltz	Team; Dance	Paso doble	Rumba	Argentine tango	Urban			
Matt & Masha	Cha-cha-cha	Waltz	Tango	Salsa	Foxtrot	Paso doble	Halloween; Marathon	Rumba	Team; Dance	Foxtrot	Argentine tango					
Torah & Robbie	Foxtrot	Contemp.	Samba	Jive	Viennese waltz	Paso doble	Halloween; Marathon									
Eamon & Ashleigh	Foxtrot	Paso doble	Quickstep	Tango	Jive	Samba	Halloween; Marathon									
Mark & Jessica	Foxtrot	Viennese waltz	Jazz	Paso doble												
Kyly & Damian	Contemp.	Waltz														
April & Aric	Viennese waltz	Samba	Rumba													
Ashley & Julz	Cha-cha-cha	Salsa														

== Reception ==
=== Viewership ===
Episode		Original airdate	Viewers (in millions)	Rank	Source
1	Week 1	30 September 2014	1.040	#6	
2	Week 2	7 October 2014	0.882	#7	
3	Week 3	14 October 2014	0.946	#5	
4	Week 4	21 October 2014	0.954	#2	
5	Week5	28 October 2014	0.902	#4	
6	Week 6	30 October 2014	0.898	#5	
7	Week 7	4 November 2014	0.883	#9	
8	Week 8	11 November 2014	0.886	#6	
9	Week 9	18 November 2014	0.908	#5	
10	Week 10	25 November 2014	1.063	#1	
