= Amanda Garner =

Australian dancer

Amanda Garner (born 1985) is a professional ballroom dancer from Australia. She is best known for her appearances on two seasons of the Australian version of Dancing with the Stars, partnering Grant Denyer to victory in the fourth season (2006).

== Early life ==
Garner was born in the rural town of Shepparton, Victoria where she still resides and trains. Amanda spent her childhood in the country town of Shepparton with her 5 other siblings and parents Peter and Barbara. As a child Amanda Garner started Hip Hop dancing but then progressed to ballroom and Latin.

== Career ==
Garner was the 3rd ranked latin dancer in Australia, having won various national championships. In 2006, Garner partnered Grant Denyer on Australia's Dancing with the Stars. Denyer and Garner won the season. Garner also partnered Jamie Durie in the sixth season (2007), finishing fourth.

Garner also works as a hair and beauty therapist.

Preceded by Ada Nicodemou & Aric Yegudkin	Dancing with the Stars (Australia) winner Season 4 (Early 2006 with Grant Denyer)	Succeeded by Anthony Koutoufides & Natalie Lowe
