= Kyly Clarke =

Australian former model

- Born: Kyly Boldy; 9 August 1981 (age 45)
- Occupations: Founder and creator of Lyfestyled By Kyly Clarke Candle & Diffuser Collection, blogger on Lyfestyled, model, television presenter and actress
- Spouse: Michael Clarke (m. 2012–2020)
- Children: 1
- Modeling information
- Height: 5 ft 8 in (173 cm)
- Hair color: brown
- Eye color: brown

Kyly Clarke (née Boldy; born 9 August 1981) is an Australian former model.

She was a presenter for The Weather Channel in Australia in 2009. Clarke has a background in modelling and acting since 1999.

Clarke won the Miss Indy 1999, Australian Swimwear Model of the Year 2002, Miss Adrenalin Sports Model of the Year 2003, Miss Hawaiian Island 2003, FHM Miss Snow Bunny 2003 and Miss Manly Warringah Sea Eagles NRL 2003. She also represented Australia overseas in the following competitions:

- Miss Australia in Face of Tourism 1999 - Singapore
- Miss Australia in Miss Queen of the World 2000 - Germany
- Miss Australia in Miss Venus Swimwear Model 2001- USA

In 2004, Clarke trained with the Australian Theatre for Young People in Sydney furthering her skills in acting.

Clarke dated Australian cricket captain Michael Clarke for 18 months before they married on 15 May 2012 in Wolgan Valley Blue Mountains NSW. In 2015 they had their first child. The pair announced their separation in February 2020.

Clarke was a participant in the fourteenth series of Dancing with the Stars.
