= Aric Yegudkin =

Australian choreographer (born 1985)

- Born: 14 November 1985 (age 41)
- Education: University of New South Wales
- Occupations: Choreographer; Dancer
- Years active: 2005—present
- Notable work: Dancing with the Stars; So You Think You Can Dance Australia
- Spouse: Masha Belash (m. 2018)

Aric Yegudkin is an Australian choreographer and professional dancer born on 14 November 1985. Yegudkin is best known as a professional dancer on the Australian Dancing with the Stars.

== Early life ==
Yegudkin started taking ballroom dance lessons at 8 years old after his parents noticed him dancing to Michael Jackson songs. They chose ballroom for their son because they were Russian as was the local ballroom dance teacher. Yegudkin competed as a Latin American dancer in dancesport competitions. In July 2001, Yegudkin partnered with Masha Belash, and the two began competing together in the youth category of dancesport. Together the pair won the Australian National Youth Latin American Championship three times.

Yegudkin is an accredited Dancesport Australia instructor. He also holds a Bachelor of Commerce from the University of New South Wales.

== Career ==
Yegudkin first competed as a professional dancer Australian Dancing With the Stars in season 3. He won his first season of the reality dance competition with celebrity partner Ada Nicodemou. After winning their season of Dancing with the Stars, Nicodemou and Yegudkin competed against past winners Tom Williams and Kym Johnson in a special televised competition. Both couples performed three dances over two weeks for the panel of judges. Nicodemou and Yegudkin won the competition and were given the "Champion of Champions" trophy. Yegudkin's other past Dancing With the Stars partners include Haley Bracken, Zoe Cramond, Rhiannon Fish and April Rose Pengilly. For the fifteenth season of Dancing with the Stars, Yegudkin was partnered with presenter Emma Freedman in which they won on 7 September 2015. In October 2016 Channel Seven announced Dancing with the Stars would not return, making Freedman and Yegudkin the final winners of the series on Seven Network. After Network Ten revived the show in 2019, Yegudkin returned partnering Michelle Bridges in season sixteen and then Claudia Karvan in season seventeen.

Yedgukin's Dancing with the Stars results are shown on the table below:

Season	Partner	Place
3	Ada Nicodemou	1st
11	Haley Bracken	2nd
12	Zoe Cramond	3rd
13	Rhiannon Fish	2nd
14	April Rose Pengilly	10th
15	Emma Freedman	1st
16	Michelle Bridges	7th
17	Claudia Karvan	3rd
18	Ada Nicodemou	3rd
19	Kylie Gillies	9th
20	Mary Coustas	3rd
21	Nikki Osborne	4th

Outside of television, Yegudkin has served as a choreographer and dancer in the Australian touring stage show Shake, Rattle 'n'Roll. Yegudkin has also performed in productions of Burn the Floor and Dance, Dance, Dance. In January 2017, Yegudkin and Belash announced they would be opening a dance studio in Sydney called Move by Aric and Masha.

== Personal life ==
Yegudkin proposed to his professional dance partner Masha Belash in 2013. Yegudkin and Belash married in October 2018. Their wedding was featured in Vogue Australia the following April. The couple are parents to twin daughters born in 2020.
