= Mark Wilson (dancer) =

Australian ballroom dancer (born 1962)

- Born: 1962 (age 63–64); Australia
- Occupations: Dancer; TV personality; TV contestant; former dance teacher
- Employer: Seven Network
- Known for: Ballroom dance, Judge on TV series Dancing with the Stars

Mark Wilson is an Australian professional ballroom dancer and dance teacher. He is a television personality, best known for being an original judge on the reality TV show – Dancing with the Stars (on the Seven Network) appearing for the first ten seasons. In 2021, he returned as a judge with other former original judges Paul Mercurio, Todd McKenney and Helen Richey, along with original host Daryl Somers.

== Biography ==
Wilson has been crowned as the Australian Dancesport Champion on five occasions – four times in New Vogue and once in Modern. He has competed throughout the UK, Europe and Japan. On two occasions, he came 15th in the World Dancesport Championship finals: once at Blackpool Tower in 1989 and again in Tokyo in 1990. Mark has also appeared in popular ABC TV show –That's Dancin', winning the professional series.

Wilson has been a judge on other various dance shows, such as Tattersalls Australian Dancesport Championship. He coaches new judges and acts as a junior development officer for Dancesport Victoria and its school dance programs. He teaches students of all ages at his own studio. These students range from beginners to medalists and competition couples.

He was a contestant on another Australian reality TV show – It Takes Two, which also airs on the Seven Network.
