= Helen Richey (dancer) =

Helen Susan Richey
- Born: 19 January 1945 (age 80); Bacchus Marsh, Victoria, Australia
- Genres: Ballroom dancer, Latin dance
- Occupation(s): Dancer, TV personality

Helen Susan Richey (born 19 January 1945) is a former competitive ballroom and latin dancer and is now a dance coach and judge. She appears as a judge in the Australian television series Dancing with the Stars.

== Biography ==
Richey was born 19 January 1945 in Bacchus Marsh, Victoria, Australia. She started dancing at a very early age, studying Ballet and Tap. At 15, she won the coveted Lily Ellison Award and two years later she met her future husband Robert, taking up Ballroom and Latin dancing. After winning the Australian Rising Stars Ballroom Championship, they travelled to the United Kingdom to further their dancing careers. Originally planning to visit for six months, they stayed for 27 years.

Her competitive career included becoming undefeated All England Latin Champion as well as the South of England Latin Champion and the Imperial Latin Champion. In the major international events, Helen was placed third in the World Professional Latin Championship, equal third in the British Professional Latin Championship, runner-up in the United Kingdom Professional Latin and was twice placed third in the International Professional Latin Championship. For seven consecutive years, Helen was a Grand Finalist in the British Professional Championship, one of the most prestigious events. She was also Australia's official representative in the World Championships in both the Ballroom and Latin Styles for over 10 years and was a regular semi-finalist in the Ballroom Style.

After retiring from competitive dancing, Helen has become one of the world's leading coaches and most sought-after adjudicators. She has judged the national dance championships of almost every country in the world. Helen has coached World Champions, British Champions and Australian Champions. Many of the professional dancers in all of the series of Dancing with the Stars have been trained wholly or in part by Helen.
