= Dancing with the Stars (Australian TV series) season 8 =

Dancing with the Stars
- Season 8
- Hosted by: Daniel MacPherson; Sonia Kruger
- Judges: Todd McKenney; Helen Richey; Mark Wilson
- Celebrity winner: Luke Jacobz
- Professional winner: Luda Kroitor
- No. of episodes: 10

Release
- Original network: Seven Network
- Original release: 31 August – 9 November 2008

Season chronology
- ← Previous; Season 7 Next → Season 9

The eighth season of the Australian Dancing with the Stars debuted on 31 August 2008. Actor Daniel MacPherson replaced Daryl Somers as host, while Sonia Kruger returned as co-host. Todd McKenney, Helen Richey, and Mark Wilson returned as judges. Paul Mercurio did not return and was not replaced.

Home and Away actor Luke Jacobz and Luda Kroitor were announced as the winners on 9 November 2008, while boxer Danny Green and Natalie Lowe finished in second place, and AFL player Paul Licuria and Eliza Campagna finished in third.

== Couples ==
This season featured ten celebrity contestants.

Celebrity	Notability	Professional partner	Status
Brooke Hanson	Olympic swimmer	John-Paul Collins	Eliminated 1st on 7 September 2008
James Tobin	Television presenter	Jade Hatcher	Eliminated 2nd on 14 September 2008
Cal Wilson	Comedian	Craig Monley	Eliminated 3rd on 21 September 2008
Red Symons	Musician	Ana Andre	Eliminated 4th on 28 September 2008
Jodi Gordon	Home and Away actress	Stefano Oliveri	Eliminated 5th on 12 October 2008
Toni Pearen	Actress	Henry Byalikov	Eliminated 6th on 19 October 2008
Charli Delaney	Hi-5 singer	Csaba Szirmai	Eliminated 7th on 2 November 2008
Paul Licuria	AFL player	Eliza Campagna	Third place on 9 November 2008
Danny Green	Boxer	Natalie Lowe	Runners-up on 9 November 2008
Luke Jacobz	Home and Away actor	Luda Kroitor	Winners on 9 November 2008

== Scoring chart ==
The highest score each week is indicated in bold green with a dagger (†), while the lowest score each week is indicated in italicized red with a double-dagger (‡).

Color key:

Winners
Runners-up
Third place
Bottom two
Eliminated

Dancing with the Stars (season 8) - Weekly scores
Couple	Pl.	Week											
Couple	Pl.	1 (Note: The couples were scored on a 40-point scale due to the presence of a guest judge.)	2	1+2	3	4	5	6	7	8	9	8+9	10
Luke & Luda	1st	24	29	53	20 (Note: This couple was in the bottom two, but was not eliminated.)	25	26	23	23+23=46	25+24=**49**†	28+26=**54**†	**103‡**	29+26+30=**85**† (Note: This couple finished in first place.)
Danny & Natalie	2nd	28	32	60	**24**†	20	24	19‡	17+25=42‡	20+25=45	24+29=53	98	23+22+26=71 (Note: This couple finished in second place.)
Paul & Eliza	3rd	29	31	60	23	23	**27**†	**28**†	22+30=**52**†	20+23=43	25+25=50	93	30+24=54 (Note: This couple finished in third place.)
Charli & Csaba	4th	27	31	58	22	22	26	24	24+27=51	18+21=39‡	26+20=46‡ (Note: This couple was eliminated.)	85†	
Toni & Henry	5th	**35**†	31	**66**†	23	**28**†	24	24	25+18=43				
Jodi & Stefano	6th	28	28	56	23	24	25	22					
Red & Ana	7th	19	17‡	36‡	14‡	19‡	21‡						
Cal & Craig	8th	22	**34**†	56	21	22							
James & Jade	9th	18‡	23	41	17								
Brooke & John-Paul	10th	19	22	41									

== Weekly scores ==
Unless indicated otherwise, individual judges scores in the chart below (given in parentheses) are listed in this order from left to right: Todd McKenney, Helen Richey, Mark Wilson.

=== Week 1 ===
Individual judges scores in the chart below (given in parentheses) are listed in this order from left to right: Todd McKenney, Helen Richey, Mark Wilson, Bruno Tonioli.

Bruno Tonioli served as a guest judge.

Couples performed either the cha-cha-cha or the foxtrot. Couples are listed in the order they performed.

Couple	Scores	Dance	Music
Charli & Csaba	27 (6, 7, 7, 7)	Cha-cha-cha	"Pictures" — Sneaky Sound System
James & Jade	18 (4, 5, 5, 4)	Foxtrot	"Miss You" — Musiq Soulchild
Brooke & John-Paul	19 (4, 5, 5, 5)	Cha-cha-cha	"Dancing in the Moonlight" — Toploader
Danny & Natalie	28 (7, 7, 7, 7)	Foxtrot	"Feeling Good" — Michael Bublé
Cal & Craig	22 (6, 6, 6, 4)	Cha-cha-cha	"Pump It Up" — Elvis Costello
Paul & Eliza	29 (7, 8, 8, 6)	Foxtrot	"Dream Catch Me" — Newton Faulkner
Luke & Luda	24 (5, 7, 6, 6)	Cha-cha-cha	"Don't Stop the Music" — Rihanna
Red & Ana	19 (5, 5, 4, 5)	Foxtrot	"Theme from Get Smart" — Hugo Montenegro
Toni & Henry	35 (9, 9, 9, 8)	Cha-cha-cha	"Mercy" — Duffy
Jodi & Stefano	28 (6, 8, 8 ,6)	Foxtrot	"Two Hearts" — Kylie Minogue

=== Week 2 ===
Individual judges scores in the chart below (given in parentheses) are listed in this order from left to right: Todd McKenney, Helen Richey, Mark Wilson, Bruno Tonioli.

Bruno Tonioli served as a guest judge.

Couples performed either the jive or the tango. Couples are listed in the order they performed.

Couple	Scores	Dance	Music	Result
Danny & Natalie	32 (8, 8, 8, 8)	Jive	"Good Golly, Miss Molly" — Little Richard	Safe
Cal & Craig	34 (9, 8, 8, 9)	Tango	"Mamma Mia" — ABBA	Safe
Jodi & Stefano	28 (6, 8, 7, 7)	Jive	"The Girl Can't Help It" — Tommy Castro	Safe
Luke & Luda	29 (6, 7, 8, 8)	Tango	"Hey Sexy Lady" — Shaggy	Safe
James & Jade	23 (5, 6, 6, 6)	Jive	"Ça plane pour moi" — Plastic Bertrand	Safe
Toni & Henry	31 (8, 7, 8, 8)	Tango	"Toxic" — Britney Spears	Safe
Red & Ana	17 (3, 5, 5, 4)	Jive	"Women in Uniform" — Skyhooks	Bottom two
Brooke & John-Paul	22 (5, 6, 5, 6)	Tango	"Maneater" — Nelly Furtado	Eliminated
Paul & Eliza	31 (7, 8, 8, 8)	Jive	"The Pretender" — Foo Fighters	Safe
Charli & Csaba	31 (8, 8, 7, 8)	Tango	"My Love" — Justin Timberlake	Safe

=== Week 3 ===
Couples performed either the samba or the waltz. Couples are listed in the order they performed.

Couple	Scores	Dance	Music	Result
Toni & Henry	23 (7, 8, 8)	Samba	"Work" — Kelly Rowland	Safe
Jodi & Stefano	23 (7, 8, 8)	Waltz	"See the Day" — Girls Aloud	Safe
Luke & Luda	20 (6, 7, 7)	Samba	"I Don't Feel Like Dancin'" — Scissor Sisters	Bottom two
James & Jade	17 (5, 6, 6)	Waltz	"Someday My Prince Will Come" — Barbra Streisand	Eliminated
Cal & Craig	21 (7, 7, 7)	Samba	"What Is Love" — Haddaway	Safe
Paul & Eliza	23 (7, 8, 8)	Waltz	"Open Arms" — Journey	Safe
Charli & Csaba	22 (7, 7, 8)	Samba	"Mas que Nada" — Black Eyed Peas, feat. Sérgio Mendes	Safe
Red & Ana	14 (4, 5, 5)	Waltz	"Are You Lonesome Tonight?" — Elvis Presley	Safe
Danny & Natalie	24 (7, 8, 9)	Waltz	"Somewhere Over the Rainbow" — Eva Cassidy	Safe

=== Week 4 ===
Couples performed either the paso doble or the quickstep. Couples are listed in the order they performed.

Couple	Scores	Dance	Music	Result
Charli & Csaba	22 (6, 8, 8)	Quickstep	"Right Now" — Pussycat Dolls	Bottom two
Paul & Eliza	23 (7, 8, 8)	Paso doble	"The Plaza of Execution" — from The Legend of Zorro & "Will and Elizabeth" — from Pirates of the Caribbean	Safe
Cal & Craig	22 (7, 7, 8)	Quickstep	"I Want to Be Evil" — Eartha Kitt	Eliminated
Red & Ana	19 (6, 6, 7)	Paso doble	"España cañí" — Salsamerica	Safe
Luke & Luda	25 (9, 8, 8)	Quickstep	"Wonderwall" — Paul Anka	Safe
Jodi & Stefano	24 (7, 8, 9)	Paso doble	"Malagueña" — Connie Francis	Safe
Toni & Henry	28 (9, 9, 10)	Quickstep	"Let's Go Crazy" — Prince	Safe
Danny & Natalie	20 (6, 7, 7)	Paso doble	"The Final Countdown" — Europe	Safe

=== Week 5 ===
Couples performed either the Argentine tango or the salsa. Couples are listed in the order they performed.

Couple	Scores	Dance	Music	Result
Jodi & Stefano	25 (8, 9, 8)	Argentine tango	"To Tango Tis Nefelis" — Haris Alexiou	Bottom two
Toni & Henry	24 (8, 8, 8)	Salsa	"American Boy" — Estelle	Safe
Danny & Natalie	24 (8, 8, 8)	Argentine tango	"Tangoscuro" — Debayres	Safe
Charli & Csaba	26 (8, 9, 9)	Salsa	"Low" — Flo Rida, feat. T-Pain	Safe
Red & Ana	21 (7, 7, 7)	Argentine tango	"Época" — Gotan Project	Eliminated
Luke & Luda	26 (8, 9, 9)	Salsa	"Bailamos" — Enrique Iglesias	Safe
Paul & Eliza	27 (9, 9, 9)	Argentine tango	"Niebla Del Riachuelo" — Otros Aires	Safe

=== Week 6 ===
Couples performed either the rumba or the West Coast Swing. Couples are listed in the order they performed.

Couple	Scores	Dance	Music	Result
Luke & Luda	23 (7, 8, 8)	West Coast Swing	"All Right Now" — Free	Safe
Paul & Eliza	28 (10, 9, 9)	Rumba	"Secret Garden" — Bruce Springsteen	Safe
Danny & Natalie	19 (5, 7, 7)	West Coast Swing	"A Little Less Conversation" — Elvis Presley vs. JXL	Bottom two
Jodi & Stefano	22 (6, 8, 8)	Rumba	"Bleeding Love" — Leona Lewis	Eliminated
Toni & Henry	24 (8, 8, 8)	Rumba	"No Air" — Jordin Sparks & Chris Brown	Safe
Charli & Csaba	24 (8, 8, 8)	West Coast Swing	"Don't Wanna Go to Bed Now" — Gabriella Cilmi	Safe

=== Week 7 ===
Each couple performed two routines. Couples are listed in the order they performed.

Couple	Scores	Dance	Music	Film	Result
Toni & Henry	25 (9, 8, 8)	Jive	"Maniac"	Flashdance	Eliminated
Toni & Henry	18 (5, 7, 6)	Foxtrot	"Always Look On The Bright Side Of Life"	Monty Python's Life of Brian	Eliminated
Luke & Luda	23 (6, 9, 8)	Jive	"Greased Lightnin'"	Grease	Bottom two
Luke & Luda	23 (7, 8, 8)	Paso doble	"Star Wars Theme"	Star Wars	Bottom two
Charli & Csaba	24 (8, 8, 8)	Paso doble	"Scott & Fran's Paso Doble"	Strictly Ballroom	Safe
Charli & Csaba	27 (9, 9, 9)	Rumba	"Colors of the Wind"	Pocahontas	Safe
Paul & Eliza	22 (6, 8, 8)	West Coast Swing	"You Never Can Tell"	Pulp Fiction	Safe
Paul & Eliza	30 (10, 10, 10)	Tango	"The Phantom of the Opera"	The Phantom of the Opera	Safe
Danny & Natalie	17 (3, 7, 7)	Salsa	"My Way (A mi manera)"	Happy Feet	Safe
Danny & Natalie	25 (8, 8, 9)	Rumba	"Stand by Me"	Stand by Me	Safe

=== Week 8 ===
Each couple performed two routines. Couples are listed in the order they performed.

Couple	Scores	Dance	Music	Result
Paul & Eliza	20 (6, 7, 7)	Cha-cha-cha	"SexyBack" — Justin Timberlake	Safe
Paul & Eliza	23 (7, 8, 8)	Salsa	"Wanna Be Startin' Somethin' 2008" — Michael Jackson, feat. Akon	Safe
Danny & Natalie	20 (6, 7, 7)	Cha-cha-cha	"Closer" — Ne-Yo	Safe
Danny & Natalie	25 (9, 8, 8)	Quickstep	"Little Green Bag" — from Reservoir Dogs	Safe
Charli & Csaba	18 (5, 7, 6)	Jive	"Yeh, Yeh" — Matt Bianco	Safe
Charli & Csaba	21 (7, 7, 7)	Foxtrot	"1234" — Feist	Safe
Luke & Luda	25 (8, 9, 8)	Rumba	"Last Request" — Paolo Nutini	Safe
Luke & Luda	24 (8, 8, 8)	Foxtrot	"Jump" — Van Halen	Safe

=== Week 9 ===
Each couple performed two routines, one of which chosen by the judges and the other of which was a segue of three different dance styles. Couples are listed in the order they performed.

Couple	Scores	Dance	Music	Result
Paul & Eliza	25 (8, 9, 8)	Jive	"Travelin' Band" — Creedence Clearwater Revival	Bottom two
Paul & Eliza	25 (8, 9 ,8)	Segue (Waltz, Rumba & Foxtrot)	"Take It to the Limit" — Eagles, "Falling into You" — Celine Dion & "Cheek to Cheek" — Doris Day	Bottom two
Danny & Natalie	24 (8, 8, 8)	Foxtrot	"I've Got the World on a String"—Michael Bublé	Safe
Danny & Natalie	29 (10, 9, 10)	Segue (Paso doble, Waltz & Jive)	"Don't Hold Back" — The Potbelleez, "Love Theme from Romeo and Juliet" — Henry Mancini & "You Can't Stop the Beat" — from Hairspray	Safe
Charli & Csaba	26 (9, 9, 8)	Tango	"Santa Maria" — Gotan Project	Eliminated
Charli & Csaba	20 (6, 7, 7)	Segue (Cha-cha-cha, Quickstep & Salsa)	"Kiss (Prince song)" — Prince, "Keep Young and Beautiful" — Annie Lennox & "Groove Is in the Heart" — Deee-Lite	Eliminated
Luke & Luda	28 (9, 10, 9)	West Coast Swing	"Just a Gigolo" — Louis Prima	Safe
Luke & Luda	26 (9, 9, 8)	Segue (Quickstep, Salsa & Tango)	"Do It Well" — Jennifer Lopez, "Desire" — U2 & "Peter Gunn" — Max Sedgley & Sarah Vaughan	Safe

=== Week 10 ===
Each couple performed their favourite dance of the season and a group cha-cha-cha, after which the couple with the lowest combined score was eliminated, and then the remaining two couples performed their freestyle routines. Couples are listed in the order they performed.

Couple	Order	Scores	Dance	Music	Result
Danny & Natalie	1	23 (7, 8, 8)	Tango	"Eye of the Tiger" — Survivor	Runners-up
Danny & Natalie	5	26 (9, 9, 8)	Freestyle	"Gonna Fly Now" — Bill Conti	Runners-up
Luke & Luda	2	29 (10, 10, 9)	Waltz	"Come Away with Me" — Norah Jones	Winners
Luke & Luda	6	30 (10, 10, 10)	Freestyle	"Boogie Wonderland" — from Happy Feet	Winners
Paul & Eliza	3	30 (10, 10, 10)	Quickstep	"Mr. Pinstripe Suit" — Big Bad Voodoo Daddy	Third place
Danny & Natalie	4	22 (8, 7, 7)	Group; Cha-cha-cha	"In These Shoes" — Kirsty MacColl	
Luke & Luda	4	26 (8, 9, 9)	Group; Cha-cha-cha	"In These Shoes" — Kirsty MacColl	
Paul & Eliza	4	24 (8, 8, 8)	Group; Cha-cha-cha	"In These Shoes" — Kirsty MacColl	

== Dance chart ==
- Week 1: Cha-cha-cha or foxtrot
- Week 2: Jive or tango
- Week 3: Samba or waltz
- Week 4: Paso doble or quickstep
- Week 5: Argentine Tango or salsa
- Week 6: Rumba or West Coast Swing
- Week 7: Two unlearned dances
- Week 8: Two unlearned dances
- Week 9: Judges' choice & a segue of three dance styles
- Week 10: Favourite dance of the season, cha-cha-cha showdown & freestyle

Dancing with the Stars (season 8) - Dance chart
Couple	Week														
Couple	1	2	3	4	5	6	7		8		9		10		
Luke & Luda	Cha-cha-cha	Tango	Samba	Quickstep	Salsa	West Coast Swing	Jive	Paso doble	Rumba	Foxtrot	West Coast Swing	Segue	Waltz	Group; Cha-cha-cha	Freestyle
Danny & Natalie	Foxtrot	Jive	Waltz	Paso doble	Argentine tango	West Coast Swing	Salsa	Rumba	Cha-cha-cha	Quickstep	Foxtrot	Segue	Tango	Group; Cha-cha-cha	Freestyle
Paul & Eliza	Foxtrot	Jive	Waltz	Paso doble	Argentine tango	Rumba	West Coast Swing	Tango	Cha-cha-cha	Salsa	Jive	Segue	Quickstep	Group; Cha-cha-cha	
Charli & Csaba	Cha-cha-cha	Tango	Samba	Quickstep	Salsa	West Coast Swing	Paso doble	Rumba	Jive	Foxtrot	Tango	Segue			
Toni & Henry	Cha-cha-cha	Tango	Samba	Quickstep	Salsa	Rumba	Jive	Foxtrot							
Jodi & Stefano	Foxtrot	Jive	Waltz	Paso doble	Argentine tango	Rumba									
Red & Ana	Foxtrot	Jive	Waltz	Paso doble	Argentine tango										
Cal & Craig	Cha-cha-cha	Tango	Samba	Quickstep											
James & Jade	Foxtrot	Jive	Waltz												
Brooke & John-Paul	Cha-cha-cha	Tango													

Preceded by Dancing with the Stars (Australian season 7)	Dancing with the Stars (Australian version); Season 8	Succeeded by Dancing with the Stars (Australian season 9)

== Reception ==
=== Viewership ===
Episode		Original airdate	Viewers (in millions)	Rank (Night)	Source
1	"Week One"	31 August 2008	1.333	#5	
2	"Week Two"	7 September 2008	1.334	#5	
3	"Week Three"	14 September 2008	1.167	#10	
4	"Week Four"	21 September 2008	1.113	#10	
5	"Week Five"	28 September 2008	1.213	#3	
6	"Week Six"	12 October 2008	1.167	#9	
7	"Week Seven"	19 October 2008	1.255	#4	
8	"Week Eight"	26 October 2008	1.344	#3	
9	"Week Nine"	2 November 2008	1.384	#1	
10	"Week Ten"	9 November 2008	1.453	#1	
