= Dancing with the Stars (Australian TV series) season 5 =

Dancing with the Stars
- Season 5
- Hosted by: Daryl Somers; Sonia Kruger
- Judges: Todd McKenney; Paul Mercurio; Helen Richey; Mark Wilson
- Celebrity winner: Anthony Koutoufides
- Professional winner: Natalie Lowe
- No. of episodes: 10

Release
- Original network: Seven Network
- Original release: 26 September – 28 November 2006

Season chronology
- ← Previous; Season 4 Next → Season 6

The fifth season of the Australian Dancing with the Stars premiered on 26 September 2006. Daryl Somers and Sonia Kruger returned as hosts, while Todd McKenney, Paul Mercurio, Helen Richey, and Mark Wilson returned as judges.

AFL player Anthony Koutoufides and Natalie Lowe were announced as the winners on 28 November 2006, while chess player Arianne Caoili and Carmelo Pizzino finished in second place.

A controversy occurred in the semifinal round when judge Todd McKenney stated that he believed Arianne Caoili had received professional dance lessons prior to the competition; Caoili denied this. Channel 7's Today Tonight supported McKenney's claims, producing video footage of Caoili attending salsa classes, but Caoili said she had just started taking salsa lessons when the producers offered her a place on the show.

== Couples ==
This season featured ten celebrity contestants.

Celebrity	Notability	Professional partner	Status
Fiona Falkiner	The Biggest Loser finalist	Serghei Bolgarschii	Eliminated 1st on 3 October 2006
Tom Waterhouse	Businessman	Alana Patience	Eliminated 2nd on 10 October 2006
Kerry Armstrong	Actress & author	Christopher Ryan	Eliminated 3rd on 17 October 2006
Gary Sweet	Film & television actor	Eliza Campagna	Eliminated 4th on 24 October 2006
Amanda Keller	Television & radio presenter	Csaba Szirmai	Eliminated 5th on 31 October 2006
Chris Hemsworth	Home and Away actor	Abbey Ross	Eliminated 6th on 7 November 2006
Andrew Gaze	National Basketball League player	Linda De Nicola	Eliminated 7th on 14 November 2006
Tamsyn Lewis	Olympic track and field athlete	Arsen Kishishian	Eliminated 8th on 21 November 2006
Arianne Caoili	Chess player	Carmello Pizzino	Runners-up on 28 November 2006
Anthony Koutoufides	AFL player	Natalie Lowe	Winners on 28 November 2006

== Scoring chart ==
The highest score each week is indicated in bold green with a dagger (†), while the lowest score each week is indicated in italicized red with a double-dagger (‡).

Color key:

Winners
Runners-up
Bottom two
Eliminated

Dancing with the Stars (season 5) - Weekly scores
Couple	Pl.	Week										
Couple	Pl.	1	2	1+2	3	4	5	6	7 (Note: The couples were scored on a 50-point scale due to the presence of a guest judge.)	8	9	10
Anthony & Natalie	1st	27	26	53	29	29	26 (Note: This couple was in the bottom two, but was not eliminated.)	35	37+33=70	33+25=58	33+35=**68**†	33+35+40=**118**† (Note: This couple finished in first place.)
Arianne & Carmello	2nd	**32**†	25	**57**†	28	**32**†	27	**37**†	34+36=70	36+29=**65**†	30+28=58	33+27+36=96‡ (Note: This couple finished in second place.)
Tamsyn & Arsen	3rd	29	27	56	**33**†	31	**32**†	31	42+36=**78**†	28+33=61	26+29=55‡ (Note: This couple was eliminated.)	
Andrew & Linda	4th	30	26	56	21	21‡	25	20‡	22+23=45‡	28+23=51‡		
Chris & Abbey	5th	18‡	20‡	38‡	20‡	29	28	24	21+28=49			
Amanda & Csaba	6th	19	**28**†	47	26	25	29	25				
Gary & Eliza	7th	19	**28**†	47	27	26	15‡					
Kerry & Christopher	8th	27	24	51	27	24						
Tom & Alana	9th	28	22	50	23							
Fiona & Serghei	10th	20	20‡	40								

== Weekly scores ==
Unless indicated otherwise, individual judges scores in the chart below (given in parentheses) are listed in this order from left to right: Todd McKenney, Helen Richey, Paul Mercurio, Mark Wilson.

=== Week 1 ===
Couples performed either the cha-cha-cha or the waltz, and are listed in the order they performed.

Couple	Scores	Dance	Music
Gary & Eliza	19 (4, 5, 5, 5)	Cha-cha-cha	"Addicted to Love" — Robert Palmer
Tamsyn & Arsen	29 (7, 7, 7, 8)	Waltz	"I Will Always Love You"—Dolly Parton
Tom & Alana	28 (8, 7, 6, 7)	Cha-cha-cha	"Señorita" — Justin Timberlake
Amanda & Csaba	19 (4, 5, 5, 5)	Waltz	"Phenomenal Woman" — Olivia Newton-John
Fiona & Sergei	20 (3, 5, 6, 6)	Cha-cha-cha	"Day-O (The Banana Boat Song)" — Harry Belafonte
Anthony & Natalie	27 (6, 8, 6, 7)	Waltz	"Run to You" — Whitney Houston
Kerry & Christopher	27 (7, 7, 6, 7)	Cha-cha-cha	"Ain't No Other Man" — Christina Aguilera
Chris & Abbey	18 (5, 5, 4, 4)	Waltz	"The Wings" — from Brokeback Mountain
Arianne & Carmello	32 (7, 9, 8, 8)	Cha-cha-cha	"I Like the Way" — BodyRockers
Andrew & Linda	30 (8, 6, 8, 8)	Waltz	"Mr. Bojangles" — Sammy Davis Jr.

=== Week 2 ===
Couples performed either the quickstep or the rumba, and are listed in the order they performed.

Couple	Scores	Dance	Music	Result
Tom & Alana	22 (5, 5, 7, 5)	Quickstep	"Good Morning" — from Singin' in the Rain	Safe
Anthony & Natalie	26 (6, 7, 6, 7)	Rumba	"What's Left of Me" — Nick Lachey	Safe
Fiona & Sergei	20 (4, 5, 6, 5)	Quickstep	"Piccadilly" — Ted Heath Orchestra	Eliminated
Tamsyn & Arsen	27 (7, 7, 6, 7)	Rumba	"Fairy Tale" — Toni Braxton	Safe
Gary & Eliza	28 (7, 6, 8, 7)	Quickstep	"42nd Street" — from 42nd Street	Safe
Andrew & Linda	26 (6, 6, 7, 7)	Rumba	"One" — U2 & Mary J. Blige	Safe
Kerry & Christopher	24 (6, 6, 6, 6)	Quickstep	"Get Happy" — Judy Garland	Bottom two
Amanda & Csaba	28 (7, 6, 8, 7)	Rumba	"Buttons" — The Pussycat Dolls	Safe
Chris & Abbey	20 (5, 5, 5, 5)	Rumba	"Babylon" — David Gray	Safe
Arianne & Carmello	25 (7, 6, 6, 6)	Quickstep	"Anything Goes" — from Indiana Jones and the Temple of Doom	Safe

=== Week 3 ===
Couples performed either the jive or the tango, and are listed in the order they performed.

Couple	Scores	Dance	Music	Result
Kerry & Christopher	27 (6, 7, 7, 7)	Jive	"Long Tall Sally" — Little Richard	Safe
Chris & Abbey	20 (5, 5, 5, 5)	Tango	"Assassin's Tango" — John Powell	Safe
Tom & Alana	23 (5, 6, 6, 6)	Jive	"Great Gosh A'Mighty" — Little Richard	Eliminated
Amanda & Csaba	26 (6, 7, 7, 6)	Tango	"Mary and Steve's Tango" — Mervyn Warren	Safe
Arianne & Carmello	28 (7, 7, 7, 7)	Jive	"Bandstand Boogie" — Barry Manilow	Safe
Anthony & Natalie	29 (7, 8, 7, 7)	Tango	"El Vaquero" — Prandi Sounds	Safe
Gary & Eliza	27 (7, 7, 7, 6)	Jive	"Bad Bad Leroy Brown" — Frank Sinatra	Safe
Tamsyn & Arsen	33 (8, 9, 8, 8)	Tango	"Sensation" — Musica & Poesia	Bottom two
Andrew & Linda	21 (5, 6, 5, 5)	Tango	"Watching You" — Rogue Traders	Safe

=== Week 4 ===
Musical guest: Ronan Keating

Couples performed either the paso doble or the foxtrot, and are listed in the order they performed.

Couple	Scores	Dance	Music	Result
Andrew & Linda	21 (2, 6, 7, 6)	Paso doble	"Holding Out for a Hero" — Bonnie Tyler	Safe
Gary & Eliza	26 (6, 7, 6, 7)	Foxtrot	"Me and My Shadow" — Robbie Williams & Jonathan Wilkes	Bottom two
Tamsyn & Arsen	31 (7, 8, 8, 8)	Paso doble	"Spanish Paso Doble" — from The Mask of Zorro	Safe
Arianne & Carmello	32 (8, 8, 8, 8)	Foxtrot	"Why Don't You Do Right?" — Sinéad O'Connor	Safe
Chris & Abbey	29 (7, 7, 8, 7)	Paso doble	"Marita"	Safe
Kerry & Christopher	24 (5, 6, 6, 7)	Foxtrot	"Moondance" — Van Morrison	Eliminated
Anthony & Natalie	29 (7, 7, 7, 8)	Paso doble	"The Stampede" — from The Lion King	Safe
Amanda & Csaba	25 (5, 6, 7, 7)	Paso doble	"Black Betty" — Spiderbait	Safe

=== Week 5 ===
Musical guest: Guy Sebastian

Couples performed the samba and are listed in the order they performed.

Couple	Scores	Dance	Music	Result
Arianne & Carmello	27 (6, 7, 7, 7)	Samba	Gypsy Kings medley	Safe
Anthony & Natalie	26 (6, 7, 7, 6)	Samba	"All Night Long (All Night)" — Lionel Richie	Bottom two
Amanda & Csaba	29 (7, 7, 8, 7)	Samba	"Bootylicious" — Destiny's Child	Safe
Chris & Abbey	28 (6, 7, 8, 7)	Samba	"Jump in the Line (Shake, Senora)" — Harry Belafonte	Safe
Gary & Eliza	15 (3, 5, 3, 4)	Samba	"These Boots Are Made for Walkin'" — Jessica Simpson	Eliminated
Tamsyn & Arsen	32 (8, 8, 8, 8)	Samba	"The Race" & "Mas que Nada" — The Black Eyed Peas	Safe
Andrew & Linda	25 (6, 6, 7, 6)	Samba	"Magalenha" — Sérgio Mendes	Safe

=== Week 6 ===
Couples are listed in the order they performed.

Couple	Scores	Dance	Music	Result
Tamsyn & Arsen	31 (8, 8, 7, 8)	Salsa	"Shake Up the Party" — Joy Enriquez	Safe
Chris & Abbey	24 (6, 6, 6, 6)	Foxtrot	"Dream a Little Dream of Me" — Michael Bublé	Safe
Andrew & Linda	20 (5, 5, 5, 5)	Salsa	"Stayin' Alive" — Bee Gees	Safe
Amanda & Csaba	25 (6, 6, 7, 6)	Foxtrot	"I Wanna Be Loved by You" — Sinéad O'Connor	Eliminated
Anthony & Natalie	35 (9, 8, 9, 9)	Quickstep	"That Old Black Magic" — Sammy Davis Jr.	Bottom two
Arianne & Carmello	37 (9, 9, 9, 10)	Salsa	"Ran Kan Kan" — Tito Puente	Safe

=== Week 7 ===
Individual judges scores in the chart below (given in parentheses) are listed in this order from left to right: Todd McKenney, Helen Richey, Paul Mercurio, Mark Wilson, Dicko.

Ian "Dicko" Dickson appeared as a guest judge.

Each couple performed one new routine, and then all couples participated in a group West Coast Swing for individual points. Couples are listed in the order they performed.

Couple	Scores	Dance	Music	Result
Arianne & Carmello	34 (6, 7, 8, 7, 6)	Tango	"Jealousy" — Billy Fury	Safe
Chris & Abbey	21 (5, 5, 3, 3, 5)	Salsa	"Get Busy" — Sean Paul	Eliminated
Tamsyn & Arsen	42 (9, 9, 8, 8, 8)	Foxtrot	"The Way You Look Tonight" — Michael Bublé	Safe
Andrew & Linda	22 (5, 5, 4, 4, 4)	Quickstep	"Sweet Georgia Brown" — Brother Bones and His Shadows	Bottom two
Anthony & Natalie	37 (5, 8, 8, 8, 8)	Salsa	"Johnny's Mambo" — from Dirty Dancing	Safe
Arianne & Carmello	36 (6, 8, 7, 8, 7)	Group; West Coast Swing	"We Will Rock You" — Queen & "SexyBack" — Justin Timberlake	
Chris & Abbey	28 (7, 6, 3, 6, 6)	Group; West Coast Swing	"We Will Rock You" — Queen & "SexyBack" — Justin Timberlake	
Tamsyn & Arsen	36 (7, 7, 7, 8, 7)	Group; West Coast Swing	"We Will Rock You" — Queen & "SexyBack" — Justin Timberlake	
Andrew & Linda	23 (4, 6, 4, 5, 4)	Group; West Coast Swing	"We Will Rock You" — Queen & "SexyBack" — Justin Timberlake	
Anthony & Natalie	33 (6, 7, 7, 7, 6)	Group; West Coast Swing	"We Will Rock You" — Queen & "SexyBack" — Justin Timberlake	

=== Week 8 ===
Couples are listed in the order they performed.

Couple	Scores	Dance	Music	Result
Tamsyn & Arsen	28	Cha-cha-cha	"It's So Nice to Have a Man Around The House" — Della Reese	Safe
Tamsyn & Arsen	33 (8, 9, 8, 8)	Quickstep	"Billy-A-Dick" — Bette Midler	Safe
Anthony & Natalie	33	Foxtrot	"As If We Never Said Goodbye" — Barbra Streisand	Bottom two
Anthony & Natalie	25 (4, 7, 7, 7)	Cha-cha-cha	"Rhythm of the Night" — DeBarge	Bottom two
Arianne & Carmello	36 (9, 9, 9, 9)	Paso doble	"Terre Aride" — Cirque du Soleil	Safe
Arianne & Carmello	29	Waltz	"His Eye Is on the Sparrow" — Lauryn Hill & Tanya Blount	Safe
Andrew & Linda	28 (7, 7, 7, 7)	Foxtrot	"Business of Love" — Domino	Eliminated
Andrew & Linda	23	Jive	"Knock on Wood" — Amii Stewart	Eliminated

=== Week 9 ===
Each couple performed two routines, one of which was the Argentine tango, and are listed in the order they performed.

Couple	Scores	Dance	Music	Result
Tamsyn & Arsen	26	Jive	"Baby Did a Bad Bad Thing" — Chris Isaak	Eliminated
Tamsyn & Arsen	29	Argentine tango	"Por una Cabeza" — from Scent of a Woman	Eliminated
Anthony & Natalie	35	Argentine tango	"Tanguera" — Musica & Poesia	Bottom two
Anthony & Natalie	33	Jive	"Blue Suede Shoes" — Elvis Presley	Bottom two
Arianne & Carmello	30	Rumba	"The Prayer" — Celine Dion & Andrea Bocelli	Safe
Arianne & Carmello	28	Argentine tango	"The Tango Lesson" — Gotan Project	Safe

=== Week 10 ===
Musical guests: Human Nature, Rogue Traders, Shannon Noll & Natalie Bassingthwaighte

Couple	Scores	Dance	Music	Result
Anthony & Natalie	33 (8, 8, 9, 8)	Quickstep	"That Old Black Magic" — Sammy Davis Jr.	Winners
Anthony & Natalie	35 (7, 9, 10, 9)	Lindy Hop	"Moonlight Serenade" — Glenn Miller	Winners
Anthony & Natalie	40 (10, 10, 10, 10)	Freestyle	"Together We Are One"—Delta Goodrem	Winners
Arianne & Carmello	33 (8, 8, 9, 8)	Paso doble	"Terre Aride" — Cirque du Soleil	Runners-up
Arianne & Carmello	27 (6, 7, 7, 7)	Lindy Hop	"Zoot Suit Riot" — Cherry Poppin' Daddies	Runners-up
Arianne & Carmello	36 (9, 9, 9, 9)	Freestyle	West Side Story medley	Runners-up

== Dance chart ==
The couples performed the following each week:

- Week 1: One unlearned dance (Cha-cha-cha or waltz)
- Week 2: One unlearned dance (Quickstep or rumba)
- Week 3: One unlearned dance (Jive or tango)
- Week 4: One unlearned dance (Foxtrot or paso doble)
- Week 5: Samba
- Week 6: One unlearned dance
- Week 7: One unlearned dance & group West Coast Swing
- Week 8: Two unlearned dances
- Week 9: One unlearned dance & Argentine tango
- Week 10: Favourite dance of the season, Lindy Hop & freestyle

Dancing with the Stars (season 5) - Dance chart
Couple	Week														
Couple	1	2	3	4	5	6	7		8		9		10		
Anthony & Natalie	Waltz	Rumba	Tango	Paso doble	Samba	Quickstep	Salsa	Group; West Coast Swing	Foxtrot	Cha-cha-cha	Argentine tango	Jive	Quickstep	Lindy Hop	Freestyle
Arianne & Carmello	Cha-cha-cha	Quickstep	Jive	Foxtrot	Samba	Salsa	Tango	Group; West Coast Swing	Paso doble	Waltz	Rumba	Argentine tango	Paso doble	Lindy Hop	Freestyle
Tamsyn & Arsen	Waltz	Rumba	Tango	Paso doble	Samba	Salsa	Foxtrot	Group; West Coast Swing	Cha-cha-cha	Quickstep	Jive	Argentine tango			
Andrew & Linda	Waltz	Rumba	Tango	Paso doble	Samba	Salsa	Quickstep	Group; West Coast Swing	Foxtrot	Jive					
Chris & Abbey	Waltz	Rumba	Tango	Paso doble	Samba	Foxtrot	Salsa	Group; West Coast Swing							
Amanda & Csaba	Waltz	Rumba	Tango	Paso doble	Samba	Foxtrot									
Gary & Eliza	Cha-cha-cha	Quickstep	Jive	Foxtrot	Samba										
Kerry & Christopher	Cha-cha-cha	Quickstep	Jive	Foxtrot											
Tom & Alana	Cha-cha-cha	Quickstep	Jive												
Fiona & Serghei	Cha-cha-cha	Quickstep													

Preceded by Dancing with the Stars (Australian season 4)	Dancing with the Stars (Australian version); Season 5	Succeeded by Dancing with the Stars (Australian season 6)
