= Dancing with the Stars (Australian TV series) season 9 =

Dancing with the Stars
- Season 9
- Hosted by: Daniel MacPherson; Sonia Kruger
- Judges: Todd McKenney; Helen Richey; Mark Wilson
- Celebrity winner: Adam Brand
- Professional winner: Jade Hatcher
- No. of episodes: 10

Release
- Original network: Seven Network
- Original release: 5 July – 6 September 2009

Season chronology
- ← Previous; Season 8 Next → Season 10

The ninth season of the Australian Dancing with the Stars debuted on 5 July 2009. Daniel MacPherson and Sonia Kruger returned as hosts, while Todd McKenney, Helen Richey, and Mark Wilson returned as judges.

Singer Adam Brand and Jade Hatcher were announced as the winners on 6 September 2009, while journalist Matt White and Ash-Leigh Hunter finished in second place, and television presenter Kylie Gillies and Carmelo Pizzino finished in third.

== Couples ==
This season featured eleven celebrity contestants.

Celebrity	Notability	Professional partner	Status
Peter "Spida" Everitt	AFL player	Linda De Nicola	Eliminated 1st on 12 July 2009
Rob Mills	Singer	Sriani Argaet	Eliminated 2nd on 19 July 2009
Emily Scott	Model	Michael Miziner	Eliminated 3rd on 26 July 2009
Layne Beachley	Professional surfer	Dannial Gosper	Eliminated 4th on 2 August 2009
Fiona O'Loughlin	Comedian	Craig Monley	Eliminated 5th on 9 August 2009
Jessica McNamee	Actress	Stefano Oliveri	Eliminated 6th on 16 August 2009
Lincoln Lewis	Home and Away actor	Luda Kroitor	Eliminated 7th on 23 August 2009
Gerrard Gosens	Paralympic goalball player	Jessica Raffa	Eliminated 8th on 30 August 2009
Kylie Gillies	Television presenter	Carmelo Pizzino	Third place on 6 September 2009
Matt White	Journalist	Ash-Leigh Hunter	Runners-up on 6 September 2009
Adam Brand	Singer	Jade Hatcher	Winners on 6 September 2009

== Scoring chart ==
The highest score each week is indicated in bold green with a dagger (†), while the lowest score each week is indicated in italicized red with a double-dagger (‡).

Color key:

Winners
Runners-up
Third place
Bottom two
Eliminated

Dancing with the Stars (season 9) - Weekly scores
Couple	Pl.	Week										
Couple	Pl.	1	2	1+2	3	4	5	6	7	8	9	10
Adam & Jade	1st	15‡	21	36	21	9	21	12	19+21=40 (Note: This couple was in the bottom two, but was not eliminated.)	21+17=38	21+26=47	21+21+24=66 (Note: This couple finished in first place.)
Matt & Ash-Leigh	2nd	22	23	45	21	25	22	16	21+25=**46**†	27+23=**50**†	27+26=53	29+25+30=**84**† (Note: This couple finished in second place.)
Kylie & Carmelo	3rd	22	**24**†	**46**†	18	25	19	**27**†	18+26=44	22+27=49	25+28+10=**63**†	23+26=49 (Note: This couple finished in third place.)
Gerrard & Jessica	4th	20	17	37	15‡	8‡	16‡	11‡	15+19=34‡	17+20=37‡	17+18=35‡ (Note: This couple was eliminated.)	
Lincoln & Luda	5th	20	22	42	21	23	23	13	21+20=41	17+27=44		
Jessica & Stefano	6th	20	**24**†	44	**23**†	**27**†	**25**†	25	19+24=43			
Fiona & Craig	7th	21	16‡	37	20	22	**25**†	19				
Layne & Dannial	8th	22	19	41	21	18	23					
Emily & Michael	9th	**23**†	19	42	**23**†	20						
Rob & Sriani	10th	19	23	42	20							
Spida & Linda	11th	17	16‡	33‡								

== Weekly scores ==
Individual judges scores in the chart below (given in parentheses) are listed in this order from left to right: Todd McKenney, Helen Richey, Mark Wilson.

=== Week 1 ===
Musical guest: Mark Vincent — "You Raise Me Up"

Couples performed either the cha-cha-cha or the waltz. Couples are listed in the order they performed.

Couple	Scores	Dance	Music
Lincoln & Luda	20 (6, 7, 7)	Cha-cha-cha	"Wish You Well" — Bernard Fanning
Kylie & Carmelo	22 (7, 8, 7)	Waltz	"Tennessee Waltz" — Redd Stewart & Pee Wee King
Rob & Sriani	19 (5, 7, 7)	Cha-cha-cha	"Love Shack" — The B-52s
Layne & Dannial	22 (6, 8, 8)	Waltz	"Apologize" — OneRepublic, feat. Timbaland
Jessica & Stefano	20 (6, 7, 7)	Cha-cha-cha	"Under Pressure" — Queen & David Bowie
Spida & Linda	17 (5, 6, 6)	Waltz	"When I Need You" — Leo Sayer
Emily & Michael	23 (8, 7, 8)	Cha-cha-cha	"Get Shaky" — The Ian Carey Project
Fiona & Craig	21 (7, 7, 7)	Waltz	"Rainbow Connection" — Jim Henson
Adam & Jade	15 (4, 5, 6)	Cha-cha-cha	"Let's Groove" — Earth, Wind & Fire
Matt & Ash-Leigh	22 (7, 8, 7)	Cha-cha-cha	"April Sun in Cuba" — Dragon
Gerrard & Jessica	20 (6, 7, 7)	Waltz	"Only One Road" — Celine Dion

=== Week 2 ===
Couples performed either the rumba or the tango. Couples are listed in the order they performed.

Couple	Scores	Dance	Music	Result
Jessica & Stefano	24 (8, 8, 8)	Tango	"Whatever Lola Wants" — Gotan Project, feat. Sarah Vaughan	Safe
Layne & Dannial	19 (6, 7, 6)	Rumba	"Umbrella" — Rihanna, feat. Jay-Z	Bottom two
Emily & Michael	19 (6, 6, 7)	Tango	"Sweet Dreams (Are Made of This)" — Eurythmics	Safe
Spida & Linda	16 (4, 6, 6)	Rumba	"Halo" — Beyoncé	Eliminated
Adam & Jade	21 (7, 7, 7)	Tango	"Cell Block Tango" — from Chicago	Safe
Kylie & Carmelo	24 (8, 8, 8)	Rumba	"True Colors" — Cyndi Lauper	Safe
Rob & Sriani	23 (7, 8, 8)	Tango	"Simple Irresistible" — Robert Palmer	Safe
Fiona & Craig	16 (4, 6, 6)	Rumba	"I'm Like a Bird" — Nelly Furtado	Safe
Matt & Ash-Leigh	23 (7, 8, 8)	Tango	"Rock the Casbah" — The Clash	Safe
Gerrard & Jessica	17 (5, 6, 6)	Rumba	"The Horses" — Daryl Braithwaite	Safe
Lincoln & Luda	22 (8, 7, 7)	Tango	"Womanizer" — Britney Spears	Safe

=== Week 3 ===
Couples performed either the foxtrot or the jive. Couples are listed in the order they performed.

Couple	Scores	Dance	Music	Result
Emily & Michael	23 (7, 8, 8)	Jive	"Great Balls of Fire" — Jerry Lee Lewis	Safe
Fiona & Craig	20 (6, 7, 7)	Foxtrot	"LOVE" — Nat King Cole	Bottom two
Matt & Ash-Leigh	21 (6, 7, 8)	Jive	"Let's Twist Again" — Chubby Checker	Safe
Gerrard & Jessica	15 (5, 5, 5)	Foxtrot	"Mack the Knife" — Bobby Darin	Safe
Rob & Sriani	20 (6, 7, 7)	Jive	"Hound Dog" — Elvis Presley	Eliminated
Layne & Dannial	21 (7, 7, 7)	Foxtrot	"Orange Colored Sky" — Natalie Cole	Safe
Adam & Jade	21 (6, 7, 8)	Jive	"Jailhouse Rock" — Elvis Presley	Safe
Kylie & Carmelo	18 (4, 7, 7)	Foxtrot	"Ain't That a Kick in the Head?" — Dean Martin	Safe
Jessica & Stefano	23 (7, 8, 8)	Jive	"Rock Around the Clock" — Bill Haley & His Comets	Safe
Lincoln & Luda	21 (7, 7, 7)	Jive	"Johnny B. Goode" —Chuck Berry	Safe

=== Week 4 ===
Couples performed either the quickstep or the salsa. Couples are listed in the order they performed.

Couple	Scores	Dance	Music	Result
Layne & Dannial	18 (6, 6, 6)	Salsa	"Right Round" — Flo Rida, feat. Kesha	Bottom two
Lincoln & Luda	23 (7, 8, 8)	Quickstep	"Are You Gonna Be My Girl" — Jet	Safe
Fiona & Craig	22 (7, 7, 8)	Salsa	"Down Under" — Men at Work	Safe
Matt & Ash-Leigh	25 (8, 8, 9)	Quickstep	"Can't Buy Me Love" — The Beatles	Safe
Kylie & Carmelo	25 (9, 8, 8)	Salsa	"Jai Ho!" — A.R. Rahman & The Pussycat Dolls, feat. Nicole Scherzinger	Safe
Adam & Jade	9 (2, 4, 3)	Quickstep	"Wake Me Up Before You Go-Go" — Wham!	Safe
Gerrard & Jessica	8 (2, 3, 3)	Salsa	"Wanna Be Startin' Somethin'" — Michael Jackson	Safe
Emily & Michael	20 (6, 7, 7)	Quickstep	"Counting the Beat" — The Swingers	Eliminated
Jessica & Stefano	27 (8, 9, 10)	Quickstep	"Cabaret" — Liza Minnelli	Safe

=== Week 5 ===
Couples performed either the Aussie Smooth or the paso doble. Couples are listed in the order they performed.

Couple	Scores	Dance	Music	Result
Jessica & Stefano	25 (9, 8, 8)	Paso doble	"Poker Face" — Lady Gaga	Safe
Kylie & Carmelo	19 (6, 7, 6)	Aussie Smooth	"Norwegian Wood" — The Beatles	Safe
Adam & Jade	21 (7, 7, 7)	Paso doble	"España cañí" — Pascual Marquina Narro	Safe
Layne & Dannial	23 (7, 8, 8)	Aussie Smooth	"Piano Man" — Billy Joel	Eliminated
Lincoln & Luda	23 (7, 8, 8)	Paso doble	"Battle Theme from Troy" — James Horner	Safe
Fiona & Craig	25 (8, 8, 9)	Aussie Smooth	"If I Ain't Got You" — Alicia Keys	Safe
Gerrard & Jessica	16 (5, 5, 6)	Aussie Smooth	"Never Tear Us Apart" — INXS	Safe
Matt & Ash-Leigh	22 (7, 7, 8)	Paso doble	"Tusk" — Fleetwood Mac	Bottom two

=== Week 6 ===
Musical guest: Pixie Lott — "Mama Do"

Couples performed either the samba or the West Coast Swing. Couples are listed in the order they performed.

Couple	Scores	Dance	Music	Result
Fiona & Craig	19 (6, 7, 6)	Samba	"Rich Girl" — Gwen Stefani	Eliminated
Matt & Ash-Leigh	16 (5, 6, 5)	West Coast Swing	"Higher Ground" — Stevie Wonder	Safe
Kylie & Carmelo	27 (10, 9, 8)	Samba	"Spice Up Your Life" — Spice Girls	Safe
Adam & Jade	12 (4, 4, 4)	West Coast Swing	"Don't Stop" — Fleetwood Mac	Safe
Jessica & Stefano	25 (8, 9, 8)	Samba	"Crazy in Love" — Beyoncé, feat. Jay-Z	Safe
Lincoln & Luda	13 (4, 4, 5)	West Coast Swing	"I Kissed a Girl" — Katy Perry	Safe
Gerrard & Jessica	11 (3, 4, 4)	Samba	"I Know You Want Me" — Pitbull	Bottom two

=== Week 7 ===
Each couple performed two routines. Couples are listed in the order they performed.

Couple	Scores	Dance	Music	Film	Result
Matt & Ash-Leigh	21 (7, 7, 7)	Salsa	"Men in Black" — Will Smith	Men in Black	Safe
Matt & Ash-Leigh	25 (8, 9, 8)	Foxtrot	"Singin' in the Rain" — Gene Kelly	Singin' in the Rain	Safe
Gerrard & Jessica	15 (5, 5, 5)	Paso doble	"Theme from Indiana Jones" — John Williams	Raiders of the Lost Ark	Safe
Gerrard & Jessica	19 (6, 6, 7)	Tango	"Por una Cabeza" — The Tango Project	Scent of a Woman	Safe
Jessica & Stefano	19 (6, 6, 7)	Waltz	"Moon River" — Audrey Hepburn	Breakfast at Tiffany's	Eliminated
Jessica & Stefano	24 (8, 8, 8)	Rumba	"I Will Always Love You" — Whitney Houston	The Bodyguard	Eliminated
Adam & Jade	19 (7, 6, 6)	Samba	"Soul Bossa Nova" — Quincy Jones	Austin Powers	Bottom two
Adam & Jade	21 (7, 7, 7)	Aussie Smooth	"My Favorite Things" — Julie Andrews	The Sound of Music	Bottom two
Kylie & Carmelo	18 (6, 6, 6)	Quickstep	"Footloose" — Kenny Loggins	Footloose	Safe
Kylie & Carmelo	26 (8, 9, 9)	Paso doble	"Theme from Superman" — John Williams	Superman	Safe
Lincoln & Luda	21 (7, 7, 7)	Rumba	"Maria" — Gene Kelly	West Side Story	Safe
Lincoln & Luda	20 (7, 6, 7)	Aussie Smooth	"Somewhere, My Love"	Doctor Zhivago	Safe

=== Week 8 ===
Each couple performed two routines. Couples are listed in the order they performed.

Couple	Scores	Dance	Music	Result
Kylie & Carmelo	22 (6, 8, 8)	Cha-cha-cha	"Can't Get You Out of My Head" — Kylie Minogue	Safe
Kylie & Carmelo	27 (9, 9, 9)	Tango	"When Doves Cry" — Prince	Safe
Gerrard & Jessica	17 (5, 6, 6)	Cha-cha-cha	"Let It Rock" — Kevin Rudolf, feat. Lil Wayne	Safe
Gerrard & Jessica	20 (6, 7, 7)	Quickstep	"Tell Her About It" — Billy Joel	Safe
Matt & Ash-Leigh	27 (9, 9, 9)	Waltz	"(You Make Me Feel Like) A Natural Woman" — Aretha Franklin	Safe
Matt & Ash-Leigh	23 (7, 8, 8)	Samba	"They Don't Care About Us" — Michael Jackson	Safe
Lincoln & Luda	17 (7, 5, 5)	Foxtrot	"We Made You" — Eminem	Eliminated
Lincoln & Luda	27 (9, 9, 9)	Salsa	"U Can't Touch This" — MC Hammer	Eliminated
Adam & Jade	21 (7, 7, 7)	Salsa	"Whenever, Wherever" — Shakira	Bottom two
Adam & Jade	17 (5, 6, 6)	Foxtrot	"Use Somebody" — Kings of Leon	Bottom two

=== Week 9 ===
Musical guest: Jimmy Barnes — "Hallelujah I Love Her So" & "Working Class Man"

Each couple performed two routines, one of which chosen by the judges and the other of which was a segue of three different dance styles. The four couples then competed in an Aussie Smooth dance-off where the judges awarded ten bonus points to the couple they felt performed the best. Couples are listed in the order they performed.

Couple	Scores	Dance	Music	Result
Gerrard & Jessica	17 (5, 6, 6)	Salsa	"Rhythm Is Gonna Get You" — Gloria Estefan and the Miami Sound Machine	Eliminated
Gerrard & Jessica	18 (6, 6, 6)	Segue	"If You Don't Know Me by Now" — Harold Melvin & the Blue Notes, "Because of You" — Kelly Clarkson & "Tequila" — The Champs	Eliminated
Kylie & Carmelo	25 (8, 8, 9)	Foxtrot	"California Dreamin'" — The Mamas and the Papas	Safe
Kylie & Carmelo	28 (9, 9, 10)	Segue	"When a Man Loves a Woman" — Percy Sledge, "99 Red Balloons" — Nena & "When I Grow Up" — The Pussycat Dolls	Safe
Matt & Ash-Leigh	27 (9, 9, 9)	Cha-cha-cha	"Save the Last Dance for Me" — Michael Bublé	Bottom two
Matt & Ash-Leigh	26 (8, 9, 9)	Segue	"La Cumparsita" — Gerardo Matos Rodríguez, "Bring Me to Life" — Evanescence & "Sympathy for the Devil" — The Rolling Stones	Bottom two
Adam & Jade	21 (7, 7, 7)	Quickstep	"Mr. Pinstripe Suit" — Big Bad Voodoo Daddy	Safe
Adam & Jade	26 (9, 9, 8)	Segue	"Khe Sanh" — Cold Chisel, "Roxanne" — The Police & "Antmusic" — Adam and the Ants	Safe
Kylie & Carmelo	10	Group; Aussie Smooth	"Iris" — Goo Goo Dolls	
Adam & Jade	No scores received	Group; Aussie Smooth	"Iris" — Goo Goo Dolls	
Gerrard & Jessica	No scores received	Group; Aussie Smooth	"Iris" — Goo Goo Dolls	
Matt & Ash-Leigh	No scores received	Group; Aussie Smooth	"Iris" — Goo Goo Dolls	

=== Week 10 ===
Musical guests:

- Jersey Boys Medley: "Sherry", "Walk Like a Man", "Big Girls Don't Cry" & "Who Loves You"
- Hugh Sheridan — "Just Can't Throw Us Away"

Each couple performed their favourite dance of the season and a group cha-cha-cha, after which the couple with the lowest combined score was eliminated, and then the remaining two couples performed their freestyle routines. Couples are listed in the order they performed.

Couple	Order	Scores	Dance	Music	Result
Kylie & Carmelo	1	23 (7, 8, 8)	Jive	"Like It Like That" — Guy Sebastian	Third place
Matt & Ash-Leigh	2	29 (9, 10, 10)	Aussie Smooth	"You and Me" — Lifehouse	Runners-up
Matt & Ash-Leigh	5	30 (10, 10, 10)	Freestyle	"Pennsylvania 6-5000" — Glenn Miller and His Orchestra	Runners-up
Adam & Jade	3	21 (7, 7, 7)	Rumba	"Fields of Gold" — Eva Cassidy	Winners
Adam & Jade	6	24 (8, 8, 8)	Freestyle	"Ready for Love" — Adam Brand	Winners
Kylie & Carmelo	4	26 (8, 9, 9)	Group; Cha-cha-cha	"I Like It Like That" — The Blackout All-Stars	
Matt & Ash-Leigh	4	25 (9, 8, 8)	Group; Cha-cha-cha	"I Like It Like That" — The Blackout All-Stars	
Adam & Jade	4	21 (7, 7, 7)	Group; Cha-cha-cha	"I Like It Like That" — The Blackout All-Stars	

== Dance chart ==
- Week 1: Cha-cha-cha or waltz
- Week 2: Rumba or tango
- Week 3: Foxtrot or jive
- Week 4: Quickstep or salsa
- Week 5: Aussie Smooth or paso doble
- Week 6: Samba or West Coast Swing
- Week 7: Two unlearned dances
- Week 8: Two unlearned dances
- Week 9: Judges choice, a segue of three dance styles & Aussie Smooth dance-off
- Week 10: Favourite dance of the season, cha-cha-cha showdown & freestyle

Dancing with the Stars (season 9) - Dance chart
Couple	Week															
Couple	1	2	3	4	5	6	7		8		9			10		
Adam & Jade	Cha-cha-cha	Tango	Jive	Quickstep	Paso doble	West Coast Swing	Samba	Aussie Smooth	Salsa	Foxtrot	Quickstep	Segue	Group; Aussie Smooth	Rumba	Group; Cha-cha-cha	Freestyle
Matt & Ash-Leigh	Cha-cha-cha	Tango	Jive	Quickstep	Paso doble	West Coast Swing	Salsa	Foxtrot	Waltz	Samba	Cha-cha-cha	Segue	Group; Aussie Smooth	Aussie Smooth	Group; Cha-cha-cha	Freestyle
Kylie & Carmelo	Waltz	Rumba	Foxtrot	Salsa	Aussie Smooth	Samba	Quickstep	Paso doble	Cha-cha-cha	Tango	Foxtrot	Segue	Group; Aussie Smooth	Jive	Group; Cha-cha-cha	
Gerrard & Jessica	Waltz	Rumba	Foxtrot	Salsa	Aussie Smooth	Samba	Paso doble	Tango	Cha-cha-cha	Quickstep	Salsa	Segue	Group; Aussie Smooth			
Lincoln & Luda	Cha-cha-cha	Tango	Jive	Quickstep	Paso doble	West Coast Swing	Aussie Smooth	Rumba	Foxtrot	Salsa						
Jessica & Stefano	Cha-cha-cha	Tango	Jive	Quickstep	Paso doble	Samba	Waltz	Rumba								
Fiona & Craig	Waltz	Rumba	Foxtrot	Salsa	Aussie Smooth	Samba										
Layne & Dannial	Waltz	Rumba	Foxtrot	Salsa	Aussie Smooth											
Emily & Michael	Cha-cha-cha	Tango	Jive	Quickstep												
Rob & Sriani	Cha-cha-cha	Tango	Jive													
Spida & Linda	Waltz	Rumba														

Preceded by Dancing with the Stars (Australian season 8)	Dancing with the Stars (Australian version); Season 9	Succeeded by Dancing with the Stars (Australian season 10)
