= Dancing with the Stars (Australian TV series) =

Australian celebrity talent show

- Genre: Reality competition
- Based on: Strictly Come Dancing by: Fenia Vardanis; Richard Hopkins; Karen Smith
- Creative director: Kelley Abbey
- Presented by: Sonia Kruger; Daryl Somers; Daniel MacPherson; Mel B; Shane Bourne; Edwina Bartholomew; Grant Denyer; Amanda Keller; Chris Brown
- Judges: Helen Richey; Todd McKenney; Mark Wilson; Paul Mercurio; Joshua Horner; Adam Garcia; Kym Johnson; Craig Revel Horwood; Sharna Burgess; Tristan MacManus
- Voices of: Andrew Peters; Damian Nicholas
- Composers: Dorian West, Neil Sutherland and others
- Country of origin: Australia
- Original language: English
- No. of seasons: 18
- No. of episodes: 164

Production
- Production locations: Global Television Studios, South Melbourne, Victoria (2004–15); Disney Studios Australia, Sydney, New South Wales (2019, 2024–present); Docklands Studios Melbourne, Melbourne, Victoria (2020); International Convention Centre Sydney, Darling Harbour, Sydney, New South Wales (2021–2022); State Sports Centre, Sydney Olympic Park, Sydney, New South Wales (2023)
- Running time: 90–150 minutes (including commercials)
- Production companies: Granada Media Australia (2004–2007); Freehand Group (2008–2013); FremantleMedia Australia (2014–2015); Warner Bros. International Television Production (2019–present); Produced under licence from BBC Studios (known as BBC Worldwide during 2004–2015)

Original release
- Network: Seven Network
- Release: 5 October 2004 – 7 September 2015
- Network: Network 10
- Release: 18 February 2019 – 29 March 2020
- Network: Seven Network
- Release: 11 April 2021 – present

Dancing with the Stars is an Australian light entertainment reality show which originally aired on the Seven Network from 2004 to 2015 and on Network 10 from 2019 to 2020. It returned to the Seven Network from 2021 onwards.

In its original version on the Seven Network, it was broadcast live from the HSV-7 studios (now Global Television studios) in Melbourne; on Network 10, it aired live from Fox Studios Australia (now Disney Studios Australia) in Sydney and Docklands Studios in Melbourne.

The show is based on the British BBC Television series Strictly Come Dancing and is part of BBC Worldwide's international Dancing with the Stars franchise.

The show pairs celebrities with professional ballroom dancers who each week compete against each other in a dance-off to impress a panel of judges and ultimately the audience in order to survive weekly elimination.

== History ==
=== 2004–2015: Seven's original iteration ===
The show debuted in a short run from October to November 2004, then returned the following February.

The show was a ratings success averaging around 2 million viewers a week nationally during its peak which places the series at number 1 of the entire day.

The logo used for the first seven series of Dancing with the Stars is similar to the logo used by Strictly Come Dancing. The logo used for the eighth series and beyond is similar to that used by the American version of Dancing with the Stars.

In October 2016, it was announced the program had been cancelled after 15 seasons by the Seven Network, despite previously suggesting a sixteenth season would air in 2017.

=== 2019–2020: 10's iteration ===
In September 2018, Network 10 announced the series would be revived and hosted by television presenters and former contestants Grant Denyer and Amanda Keller. The revival premiered on 18 February 2019. In October 2019, the series was renewed for a seventeenth season, which premiered on 9 February 2020.

In October 2020, Network 10 announced the revived series was cancelled.

=== 2021–present: Seven's second iteration ===
In December 2020, Seven announced they had re-gained the rights to the series, and would produce a second revival series with an All-Stars edition in 2021. Unlike previous iterations, these seasons were pre-recorded, with voting from the studio audience replacing the televoting used in previous iterations.

The series was filmed at the ICC in Sydney during March 2021. The season premiered on 11 April 2021. In March 2023, the series was renewed for a 20th season which premiered on 18 June 2023, the season all-stars and featured all first time contestants. In October 2023, the series was renewed for a 21st season, it was also announced that Daryl Somers would be leaving the show, and he was replaced by veterinarian Chris Brown, with Kruger returning to her hosting position to co-host alongside Brown.

== Cast ==
=== Hosts ===
From seasons 1 to 7 and season 18 to 20, entertainer Daryl Somers and dancer/actress/television presenter Sonia Kruger were the two primary hosts. For season 8, Somers was replaced by actor Daniel MacPherson, when Somers returned to the Nine network to host the revived Hey Hey It's Saturday. Kruger continued to co-host with MacPherson, until the start of season 12, when she also went to the Nine network. Kruger was subsequently replaced by former Spice Girl Melanie Brown, who is a former contestant in the American version of the show, in season 5. In 2013, Brown was replaced by Sunrise weather presenter Edwina Bartholomew. In 2015, Shane Bourne replaced Daniel MacPherson as co-host.

It was announced in September 2018 that in 2019, a 16th season would begin. A whole new cast and crew would be involved in a new production with a "fresh look" with Grant Denyer and Amanda Keller co-hosting.

Host	Season																					
Host	1	2	3	4	5	6	7	8	9	10	11	12	13	14	15	16	17	18	19	20	21	22
Sonia Kruger	●	●	●	●	●	●	●	●	●	●	●							●	●	●	●	●
Daryl Somers	●	●	●	●	●	●	●											●	●	●		
Daniel MacPherson								●	●	●	●	●	●	●								
Mel B												●										
Edwina Bartholomew													●	●	●							
Shane Bourne															●							
Grant Denyer																●	●					
Amanda Keller																●	●					
Chris Brown																					●	●

=== Judges ===
From seasons 1 to 7, the judging panel consisted of four primary judges: Todd McKenney, Helen Richey, Paul Mercurio and Mark Wilson. At the start of season 8, Mercurio left the judging panel. Before the eleventh season began, Wilson was fired by the Seven network and replaced by Joshua Horner. McKenney, Richey and Horner made up the primary judging panel starting in 2011. Kym Johnson, former pro dancer on both the American and Australian versions of the show, and Adam Garcia join the judging panel in 2013. In 2015, Bruno Tonioli, who judged on both British and American versions, replaced Garcia as a judge for the first three weeks before leaving just three judges for the rest of the season.

Ian "Dicko" Dickson and Bruno Tonioli have also appeared as guest judges throughout the series, providing feedback and scores as part of their judging role. Pamela Anderson, Damian Whitewood, Olivia Newton-John and Dame Edna Everage have also appeared as guest judges on the Seven Network series, but providing comments and feedback only.

For season 16, the judging panel consisted of three primary judges: Craig Revel Horwood, Sharna Burgess and Tristan MacManus.

For seasons 18 and 19, the original panel of Todd McKenney, Helen Richey, Paul Mercurio and Mark Wilson returned.

For season 20, McKenney and Mercurio departed, while Burgess and Revel Horwood returned to the series.

Judge	Season																					
Judge	1	2	3	4	5	6	7	8	9	10	11	12	13	14	15	16	17	18	19	20	21	22
Todd McKenney	●	●	●	●	●	●	●	●	●	●	●	●	●	●	●			●	●	●		
Helen Richey	●	●	●	●	●	●	●	●	●	●	●	●	●	●	●			●	●		●	●
Mark Wilson	●	●	●	●	●	●	●	●	●	●								●	●	●	●	●
Paul Mercurio	●	●	●	●	●	●	●											●	●			
Joshua Horner											●	●										
Kym Johnson													●	●	●							
Adam Garcia													●	●								
Craig Revel Horwood																●	●			●	●	●
Sharna Burgess																●	●			●	●	●
Tristan MacManus																●	●					

=== Professional partners ===
Color key:

Winner
Runner-up
Third place
Fourth place
Fifth place
Celebrity partner withdrew from the competition
Celebrity partner participating in the competition

Professional dancer	Season																					
Professional dancer	1	2	3	4	5	6	7	8	9	10	11	12	13	14	15	16	17	18	19	20	21	22
Ana Andre								Red Symons														
Sriani Argaet									Rob Mills													Osher Günsberg
Leanne Bampton			Ian "Dicko" Dickson	Toby Allen																		
Masha Belash			Ky Hurst								Nathan Bracken			Matt Cooper	Matthew Mitcham							
Serghei Bolgarschii				Jennifer Hawkins	Fiona Falkiner		Jessica Rowe			Melinda Schneider												
Olya Bourtasova							James Courtney															
Alexander Bryan				Kate Langbroek																		
Dianne Buswell															Jude Bolton							
Jarryd Byrne													Jesinta Campbell	Ricki-Lee Coulter	Ash Pollard	Olympia Valance	Celia Pacquola	Renee Bargh	Ricki-Lee Coulter			
Henry Byalikov								Toni Pearen														
Julian Caillon																	Angie Kent	Erin McNaught	Angie Kent			
Eliza Campagna				Luke Ricketson	Gary Sweet	David Graham	Michael Klim	Paul Licuria		Jason Stevens												
Sandro Catalano							Patti Newton															
John Paul Collins				Alicia Molik		Kate Ceberano		Brooke Hanson														
Lily Cornish																Jett Kenny	Christian Wilkins	Lincoln Lewis	Grant Denyer	Issa Schultz	Hayden Quinn	Kyle Shilling
Marco De Angelis																Cassandra Thorburn						
Gordon Derbogosijan				Simone Callahan																		
Alarna Donovan																			Rob Mills			
Jonathan Doone		Suzie Wilks																				
Sasha Farber		Nikki Webster																				
Jorja Freeman														Tai Hara		Samuel Johnson	Ed Kavalee	Luke Jacobz			James Stewart	
Amanda Garner				Grant Denyer		Jamie Durie																
Jeremy Garner																Denise Scott		Fifi Box				
Ruby Gherbaz																		Matty Johnson	Sam Mac	Charlie Albone		
Gordon Gilkes			Dawn Fraser																			
Andrey Gorbunov																					Julie Goodwin	Karina Carvalho
Dannial Gosper									Layne Beachley	Jo Beth Taylor			Libby Trickett									
Steven Grace						Naomi Robson																
Paul Green						Fifi Box																
Jade Hatcher								James Tobin	Adam Brand		Mark Occhilupo		Zac Stenmark									
Mark Hodge	Gabrielle Richens	Holly Brisley									Jan Stephenson											
Melanie Hooper											Damien Leith	Brian Mannix	Tony Barber	David Rodan								
Brendan Humphreys						Tatiana Grigorieva																
Ash-Leigh Hunter									Matt White				Steve Hooker	Eamon Sullivan	Mat Rogers					Phil Burton	Shane Crawford	Shaun Micallef
Igor Ifliand																				Paulini		
Kym Johnson	Justin Melvey	Tom Williams	Michael Caton																			
Joshua Keefe															Samantha Harris	Courtney Act			Courtney Act			
Mitch Kirkby																				Sally Pearson		
Arsen Kishishian					Tamsyn Lewis					Alex Fevola	Brynne Edelsten											
Robbie Kmetoni														Torah Bright								
Luda Kroitor		Jason Smith	David Campbell	Kostya Tszyu			Anh Do	Luke Jacobz	Lincoln Lewis	George Houvardas	Dan Ewing	Johnny Ruffo										
Natalie Lowe	Matt Shirvington	Ian Roberts			Anthony Koutoufides	Tim Campbell		Danny Green												James Magnussen		Michael Usher
Lyu Masuda																		Jessica Gomes	Deni Hines	Emily Weir	Nadia Bartel	Susie O'Neill
Brendon Midson										Esther Anderson	Samantha Armytage											
Michael Miziner	Bec Cartwright		Tania Zaetta						Emily Scott	Rachael Finch			Sophia Pou									
Craig Monley							Bridie Carter	Cal Wilson	Fiona O'Loughlin									Bec Hewitt	Bridie Carter	Christie Whelan Browne	Nova Peris	Brittany Hockley
Shae Mountain																	Dami Im	Schapelle Corby				
Violeta Mugica																	Travis Cloke					
Linda de Nicola					Andrew Gaze	Wendell Sailor	Mark Beretta		Peter Everitt													
Stefano Oliveri								Jodi Gordon	Jessica McNamee													
Christopher Page												Vogue Williams										
Andrew Palmer			Nicky Buckley																			
Katrina Patchett																		Manu Feildel				
Alana Patience			Brodie Holland	Molly Meldrum	Tom Waterhouse					Rob Palmer	Manu Feildel		Brendan Jones	Paul Fenech	Larry Emdur							
Giselle Peacock															John Paul Young							
Jenni Pedersen	John Wood																					
Liza van Pelt										David Wirrpanda												
Carmello Pizzino				Noeline Brown	Arianne Caoili				Kylie Gillies	Tamara Jaber	Lara Bingle	Kerri-Anne Kennerley	Sally Obermeder	Lynne McGranger	Lynette Bolton							
Siobhan Power																Curtly Ambrose		Jamie Durie	Kris Smith		Ben Cousins	Harry Garside
Jessica Prince												Caine Eckstein	Jordan Stenmark	Mark Holden								
Jessica Raffa									Gerrard Gosens	Blair McDonough	Nick Bracks	Brendan Fevola	Cosentino						Anthony Koutoufides	Matt Preston	Adam Dovile	Trent Cotchin
Emily Reilly						Todd Woodbridge																
Abbey Ross					Chris Hemsworth																	
Christopher Ryan					Kerry Armstrong																	
Elena Samodanova												Shannon Noll										
Damien Samuel												Jessica Watson										
Gleb Savchenko												Erin McNaught										
Danil Saveliev																				Laura Byrne		
Karina Schembri							David Hobson															
Trenton Shipley			Chris Bath																			
Patrice Smith	James Tomkins	Derryn Hinch																				
Csaba Szirmai	Katrina Warren	Shane Gould			Amanda Keller		Corinne Grant	Charli Delaney														
Declan Taylor																				Pia Miranda		
Julz Tocker														Ashley Hart								
Salvatore Vecchio	Pauline Hanson																					
Gustavo Viglio																Constance Hall	Chloe Lattanzi	Kyly Clarke	Olympia Valance		Samantha Jade	Mia Fevola
Alexandra Vladimirov																Jimmy Rees	Dean Wells	Tom Williams	David Rodan		Ant Middleton	
Ian Waite																				Virginia Gay	Lisa McCune	Rebecca Gibney
Camille Webb															Tim Robards							
Sarah West		Steven Bradbury																				
Trent Whiddon		Sara-Marie Fedele																				
Megan Wragg																Miguel Maestre	Beau Ryan		Cameron Daddo	Gavin Wanganeen		
Michael Wojick							Elka Graham															
Damian Whitewood												Danielle Spencer	Tina Arena	Kyly Clarke	Kelly Cartwright							
Aric Yegudkin			Ada Nicodemou								Haley Bracken	Zoe Cramond	Rhiannon Fish	April Rose Pengilly	Emma Freedman	Michelle Bridges	Claudia Karvan	Ada Nicodemou	Kylie Gillies	Mary Coustas	Nikki Osborne	Felicity Ward
Paul Zaidman						Kimberley Davies																

== Series overview ==
Season	No. of stars	Duration dates		Celebrity honour places			Network
Season	No. of stars	Premiere	Finale	Winner	Second place	Third place	Network
1	8	5 October 2004	23 November 2004	Bec Hewitt & Michael Miziner	Pauline Hanson & Salvatore Vecchio	Justin Melvey & Kym Johnson	Seven
2	10	8 February 2005	26 April 2005	Tom Williams & Kym Johnson	Ian Roberts & Natalie Lowe	Holly Brisley & Mark Hodge	Seven
3	10	6 September 2005	8 November 2005	Ada Nicodemou & Aric Yegudkin	Chris Bath & Trenton Shipley	Ian "Dicko" Dickson & Leanne Bampton	Seven
4	10	21 February 2006	9 May 2006	Grant Denyer & Amanda Garner	Kostya Tszyu & Luda Kroitor	Toby Allen & Leanne Bampton	Seven
5	10	3 October 2006	28 November 2006	Anthony Koutoufides & Natalie Lowe	Arianne Caoili & Carmello Pizzino	Tamsyn Lewis & Arsen Kishishian	Seven
6	10	20 February 2007	1 May 2007	Kate Ceberano & John-Paul Collins	Fifi Box & Paul Green	Tim Campbell & Natalie Lowe	Seven
7	10	25 September 2007	27 November 2007	Bridie Carter & Craig Monley	Anh Do & Luda Kroitor	David Hobson & Karina Schembri	Seven
8	10	31 August 2008	9 November 2008	Luke Jacobz & Luda Kroitor	Danny Green & Natalie Lowe	Paul Licuria & Eliza Campagna	Seven
9	11	5 July 2009	6 September 2009	Adam Brand & Jade Hatcher	Matt White & Ash-Leigh Hunter	Kylie Gillies & Carmello Pizzino	Seven
10	11	27 June 2010	29 August 2010	Rob Palmer & Alana Patience	Tamara Jaber & Carmello Pizzino	Alex Fevola & Arsen Kishishian	Seven
11	11	8 May 2011	10 July 2011	Manu Feildel & Alana Patience	Haley Bracken & Aric Yegudkin	Damien Leith & Melanie Hooper	Seven
12	11	15 April 2012	17 June 2012	Johnny Ruffo & Luda Kroitor	Danielle Spencer & Damian Whitewood	Zoe Cramond & Aric Yegudkin	Seven
13	12	1 October 2013	26 November 2013	Cosentino & Jessica Raffa	Rhiannon Fish & Aric Yegudkin	Tina Arena & Damian Whitewood	Seven
14	11	30 September 2014	25 November 2014	David Rodan & Melanie Hooper	Lynne McGranger & Carmello Pizzino	Ricki-Lee Coulter & Jarryd Byrne	Seven
15	11	19 July 2015	7 September 2015	Emma Freedman & Aric Yegudkin	Matthew Mitcham & Masha Belash	Ash Pollard & Jarryd Byrne	Seven
16	11	18 February 2019	22 April 2019	Samuel Johnson & Jorja Freeman	Courtney Act & Joshua Keefe	Constance Hall & Gustavo Viglio	Ten
17	10	9 February 2020	29 March 2020	Celia Pacquola & Jarryd Byrne	Christian Wilkins & Lily Cornish	Claudia Karvan & Aric Yegudkin	Ten
18	14	11 April 2021	25 April 2021	Luke Jacobz & Jorja Freeman	Bec Hewitt & Craig Monley	Ada Nicodemou & Aric Yegudkin; Kyly Clarke & Gustavo Viglio; Lincoln Lewis & Lily Cornish; Manu Feildel & Katrina Patchett	Seven
19	14	20 February 2022	3 April 2022	Grant Denyer & Lily Cornish	Courtney Act & Joshua Keefe	David Rodan & Alexandra Vladimirov; Deni Hines & Lyu Masuda; Kris Smith & Siobhan Power; Ricki-Lee Coulter & Jarryd Byrne	Seven
20	14	18 June 2023	23 July 2023	Phil Burton & Ash-Leigh Hunter	Emily Weir & Lyu Masuda	Christie Whelan Browne & Craig Monley; Mary Coustas & Aric Yegudkin; Paulini & Igor Ifliand; Virginia Gay & Ian Waite	Seven
21	12	7 July 2024	12 August 2024	Lisa McCune & Ian Waite	Samantha Jade & Gustavo Viglio	Ant Middleton & Alexandra Vladimirov	Seven
22	12	15 June 2025	4 August 2025	Kyle Shilling & Lily Cornish	Shaun Micallef & Ash-Leigh Hunter	Trent Cotchin & Jessica Raffa; Michael Usher & Natalie Lowe; Felicity Ward & Aric Yegudkin; Brittany Hockley & Craig Monley	Seven

== Champion of Champions ==
In late 2005, the winners of series two (Tom Williams) and three (Ada Nicodemou) competed against each other for the title of Champion of Champions. Series one winner Bec Hewitt did not compete, as she was pregnant at the time. Ada Nicodemou and her partner Aric Yegudkin won the championship, defeating Tom Williams and his partner, Kym Johnson, based on the judges' scores.

=== Scoring chart ===
Red numbers indicate the couples with the lowest score for each week.
Green numbers indicate the couples with the highest score for each week.
indicates the winning couple.
indicates the runner-up couple.

Couple	Place	1	2	1+2
Ada & Aric	1	31+31+31=93	29+33+38=100	193
Tom & Kym	2	25+33+33=91	26+31+40=97	188

=== Running Order ===
Individual judges scores in the chart below (given in parentheses) are listed in this order from left to right: Todd McKenney, Helen Richey, Paul Mercurio, Mark Wilson.

=== Week 1 ===
Running order

Couple	Score	Style	Music
Ada & Aric	31 (7, 8, 8, 8)	Cha-Cha-Cha	"Get The Party Started" – Pink
Ada & Aric	31 (8, 8, 8, 7)	Samba	"Bamboléo"—Gipsy Kings
Ada & Aric	31 (9, 8, 8, 6)	Period Jive	"In the Mood"—Glenn Miller
Tom & Kym	25 (6, 7, 6, 6)	Cha-Cha-Cha	"Get The Party Started"—Pink
Tom & Kym	33 (9, 8, 8, 8)	Quickstep	"That's Dancing"—Henry Mancini
Tom & Kym	33 (7, 9, 8, 9)	Period Jive	"Boogie Woogie Bugle Boy"—The Andrews Sisters

=== Week 2 ===
Running order

Couple	Score	Style	Music
Ada & Aric	29 (7, 7, 8, 7)	Foxtrot	"On the Sunny Side of the Street" – Steve Tyrell
Ada & Aric	33 (9, 8, 8, 8)	Ballroom Segue	"Big Spender" – Shirley Bassey "Money, Money, Money" – ABBA "I Have Nothing"—Whitney Houston
Ada & Aric	38 (10, 9, 10, 9)	Freestyle	"Chopper Chase from The Italian Job"—John Powell
Tom & Kym	26 (6, 7, 7, 6)	Foxtrot	"On the Sunny Side of the Street" – Steve Tyrell
Tom & Kym	31 (7, 8, 8, 8)	Latin Segue	"España cañí"—Pascual Marquina Narro "Harlem Nocturne"—Earle Hagen "Proud Mary"—John Fogerty
Tom & Kym	40 (10, 10, 10, 10)	Freestyle	"History Repeating"—The Propellerheads feat. Shirley Bassey "(I Can't Get No) Satisfaction"—The Rolling Stones

== Ratings ==
Season	Market					
Season	Sydney	Melbourne	Brisbane	Adelaide	Perth	5-Cities
1	624,250	543,625	320,375	183,250	223,125	1,894,625
2	590,500	590,100	315,700	191,200	219,500	1,907,000
3	610,900	633,500	327,700	205,300	234,800	2,011,800
4	685,600	647,900	430,700	218,200	251,800	2,234,100
5	549,800	517,700	277,200	182,200	207,000	1,733,900
6	576,400	569,900	314,700	189,500	209,200	1,859,600
7	555,300	543,700	294,700	174,200	219,400	1,786,800
8	399,400	402,100	193,200	109,500	171,000	1,275,300
9	424,300	397,900	311,100	144,900	169,700	1,447,700

== See also ==
- Dancing with the Stars
- Strictly Dancing
