= Melanie Hooper =

Australian ballroom and Latin dancer

Melanie Hooper is an Australian ballroom and Latin dancer. She was a professional dancer on Australia's Dancing with the Stars. She also toured with dance show Burn the Floor.

== Early life ==
Melanie Hooper was born in Townsville, Australia. Hooper began dancing at age 13.

== Career ==
Hooper moved to Brisbane at age 21 to advance her dance career. She began competing in Sydney and Melbourne. Then, to further her career she moved to London, England. Her dancing titles include UK Rising Star Professional Latin Champion, German Professional Rising Star Latin Champion, Australian Open Professional Latin Champion, and Moscow World Professional Latin. In 2008, Hooper joined the dance show Burn the Floor. She was with the production when it moved to Broadway in 2009.

Hooper joined Australia's Dancing with the Stars in 2011, In her first season as a professional dancer, she partnered Damien Leith. They placed third. Her 2012 partner was 80's rocker Brian Mannix. In spite of low scores, Mannix and Hooper made it to week eight of the competition. The following season she was paired with television performer Tony Barber. Barber was the second celebrity eliminated. In 2014, her partner was AFL player David Rodan. Rodan and Hooper received five perfect scores on their way to winning the competition.

Hooper toured the United Kingdom with Strictly Come Dancing professional Brendan Cole's tours in 2012, 2013, and 2014.

== Personal life ==
In 2013, Hooper was engaged to Jarrod Tranter. Hooper married Tranter in 2015.
