= Luda Kroitor =

Australian dancer

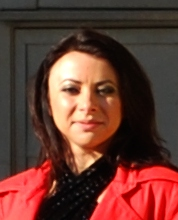
- Luda Kroitor, September 2009
- Occupations: Television personality and dancer
- Notable credit: Dancing with the Stars

Luda Kroitor is a salsa dancer from Australia. She is a five time world Salsa champion. She also won Australia's Dancing with the Stars twice.

== Early life ==
Kroitor was born in Moldova. She moved to Australia at ten years old. At ten years old, she partnered with dancer Oliver Pineda.

== Career ==
Kroitor is the former five time world Salsa champion with dance partner Oliver Pineda. She is known for her role as dance instructor on Dancing with the Stars. She rose to fame after winning Dancing with the Stars series 8, with her partner Luke Jacobz, who was an actor on Home and Away and McLeod's Daughters. She also won while partnered with singer Johnny Ruffo, in series 12.

Kroitor also choreographed for Australia's So You Think You Can Dance.

== Personal life ==
In 2012, Kroitor became engaged to Matt Wilson. The couple had a daughter together in 2014.

== See also ==
- Emanuel School, Australia

Preceded by Chris Bath & Trenton Shipley	Dancing with the Stars (Australia) runner up Season 4 (Early 2006 with Kostya Tszyu)	Succeeded by Arianne Caoili & Carmello Pizzino
Preceded by Fifi Box & Paul Green	Dancing with the Stars (Australia) runner up Season 7 (Late 2007 with Anh Do)	Succeeded by Paul Licuria & Eliza Campagna
Preceded by Bridie Carter & Craig Monley	Dancing with the Stars (Australia) winner Season 8 (2008 with Luke Jacobz)	Succeeded by Adam Brand & Jade Hatcher
Preceded by Manu Feildel & Alana Patience	Dancing with the Stars (Australia) winner Season 12 (2012 with Johnny Ruffo)	Succeeded by Cosentino & Jessica Raffa
