= Bridie Carter =

Australian actress (born 1970)

- Born: 18 December 1970 (age 55); Melbourne, Australia
- Occupation: Actress
- Years active: 1976–present
- Spouse: Michael Wilson (m. 2004)
- Children: 2
- Family: Kiffy Rubbo (mother); Michael Rubbo (uncle); Antonio Dattilo Rubbo (great-grandfather)

Bridie Carter (born 18 December 1970) is an Australian actress best known for her role as the main character of Tess Silverman McLeod on the television drama series McLeod's Daughters.

== Early life ==
Bridie was born and raised in Melbourne, Australia, the eldest of three children. She has two younger brothers. Her mother, Kiffy Rubbo, was a gallery director.

== Career ==
Carter has been acting since the age of six and started her first classes at the Bouverie Street Theatre in Carlton, Melbourne. She graduated from the National Institute of Dramatic Art in 1994. She is perhaps best known for her starring role as Tess Silverman McLeod in the hit Nine Network television series McLeod's Daughters. She appeared on the show for its first six seasons. She was nominated for many Silver and Gold Logies for her performance as Tess McLeod, including the industry-voted Most Outstanding Actress in 2004. Her other television credits include G.P., Water Rats, All Saints, Murder Call, and Above the Law, where she had the starring role of Senior Constable Debbie Curtis.

Carter appeared in the play No Names No Packdrill at Sydney's Parade Theatre in 2006. In 2009, she reunited with her McLeod's Daughters co-star Aaron Jeffery in A.R. Gurney's Love Letters.

In 2011 she appeared in Wild Boys for the Seven Network and Rescue: Special Ops for the Nine Network. From 2015 to 2018, Carter appeared in the comedy-drama series, 800 Words throughout its entire run of three seasons.

In 2020, it was announced that Carter would be joining the cast of Seven Network soap opera Home and Away as Susie McAllister. This is her third role in the series, as she previously portrayed the guest roles of Toni Jarvis and Brooke Taylor in 1995 and 1999 respectively. She made her first appearance as Susie during the show's 34th season which began in February 2021. She made her final appearance on 31 March 2021.

== Personal life ==
In early May 2004, she married clothing designer Michael Wilson; they have two children.

== Filmography ==
=== Film ===
| Year | Title | Role | Notes |
|---|---|---|---|
| 1999 | Fresh Air | E | |
| 1999 | Envy | Kirsty | |
| 2010 | I Love You Too | Marie | |
| 2011 | There's a Hippopotamus on Our Roof Eating Cake | Mother | Short |
| 2011 | Ragtime | Kate | Short |
| 2012 | The Things My Father Never Taught Me | Mary | Short |
| 2015 | Skin | Carol | Short |
| 2015 | Nostalgia | Carolyn | Short |
| 2016 | Emo the Musical | Mrs. Doyle | |

=== Television ===
| Year | Title | Role | Notes |
|---|---|---|---|
| 1990 | Neighbours | Andrea | Season 6 (guest, 1 episode) |
| 1995 | Home and Away | Toni Jarvis | Season 8 (guest, 2 episodes) |
| 1996 | G.P. | Dr. Amanda Selwyn | "Sing Me a Lullaby" |
| 1997 | Simone de Beauvoir's Babies | Dating Agent | TV miniseries |
| 1997 | Kangaroo Palace | Dianne | TV film |
| 1997 | Water Rats | Joanne Calvert | "Blood Trail", "Dead or Alive" |
| 1998 | All Saints | Karen McCarthur | "Cards on the Table" |
| 1999 | Home and Away | Brooke Taylor | Season 12 (recurring, 5 episodes) |
| 2000 | Above the Law | Debbie Curtis | Main role |
| 2000 | Murder Call | Jessica Millay | "Done to Death" |
| 2001 | My Husband, My Killer | Janey | TV film |
| 2001–06 | McLeod's Daughters | Tess Silverman McLeod | Seasons 1–6 (main role, 135 episodes) |
| 2007 | Dancing with the Stars | Herself | Contestant, winner |
| 2011 | Rescue: Special Ops | Stephanie Rouse | "The Dunes" |
| 2011 | Wild Boys | Victoria | "1.3" |
| 2014 | It's a Date | Sharna | "Should You Re-Connect with an Old Flame?" |
| 2015–18 | 800 Words | Jan | Seasons 1–3 (main role, 40 episodes) |
| 2021 | Home and Away | Susie McAllister | Season 34 (recurring, 20 episodes) |
| 2022 | Dancing with the Stars | Herself | Contestant |

== Awards and nominations ==
- 2003 Nominated: Silver Logie for Most Popular Actress (McLeod's Daughters)
- 2004 Nominated: Silver Logie for Most Popular Actress (McLeod's Daughters)
- 2004 Nominated: Silver Logie for Most Outstanding Actress in a Drama Series (McLeod's Daughters)
- 2005 Nominated: Silver Logie for Most Popular Actress (McLeod's Daughters)
- 2005 Nominated: Gold Logie for Most Popular Personality on Australian Television (McLeod's Daughters)
- 2006 Nominated: Gold Logie for Most Popular Personality on Australian Television (McLeod's Daughters)

| Preceded by Kate Ceberano & John-Paul Collins | Dancing with the Stars (Australia) winner Season 7 (Late 2007 with Craig Monley) | Succeeded by Luke Jacobz & Luda Kroitor |
