= Dancing with the Stars (Australian TV series) season 7 =

Dancing with the Stars
- Season 7
- Hosted by: Daryl Somers; Sonia Kruger
- Judges: Todd McKenney; Paul Mercurio; Helen Richey; Mark Wilson
- Celebrity winner: Bridie Carter
- Professional winner: Craig Monley
- No. of episodes: 10

Release
- Original network: Seven Network
- Original release: 25 September – 27 November 2007

Season chronology
- ← Previous; Season 6 Next → Season 8

The seventh season of the Australian Dancing with the Stars debuted on 25 September 2007. Daryl Somers and Sonia Kruger returned as hosts, although this was the last season to be hosted by Somers. Todd McKenney, Paul Mercurio, Helen Richey, and Mark Wilson also returned as judges, and this would also be Mercurio's last season.

Actress Bridie Carter and Craig Monley were announced as the winners on 27 November 2007, while comedian Anh Do and Luda Kroitor finished in second place.

== Couples ==
This season featured ten celebrity contestants.

| Celebrity | Notability | Professional partner | Status |
|---|---|---|---|
| Michael Klim | Olympic swimmer | Eliza Campagna | Eliminated 1st on 2 October 2007 |
| Corinne Grant | Comedian | Csaba Szirmai | Eliminated 2nd on 9 October 2007 |
| Elka Graham | Olympic swimmer | Michael Wojick | Eliminated 3rd on 16 October 2007 |
| Jessica Rowe | Journalist | Serghei Bolgarschii | Eliminated 4th on 23 October 2007 |
| James Courtney | Racing driver | Olya Bourtasova | Eliminated 5th on 30 October 2007 |
| Mark Beretta | Journalist | Linda De Nicola | Eliminated 6th on 6 November 2007 |
| Patti Newton | Singer | Sandro Catalano | Eliminated 7th on 13 November 2007 |
| David Hobson | Tenor | Karina Schembri | Eliminated 8th on 20 November 2007 |
| Anh Do | Comedian | Luda Kroitor | Runners-up on 27 November 2007 |
| Bridie Carter | Actress | Craig Monley | Winners on 27 November 2007 |

== Scoring chart ==
The highest score each week is indicated in bold green with a dagger (†), while the lowest score each week is indicated in italicized red with a double-dagger (‡).

Color key:

Winners
Runners-up
Bottom two
Eliminated

Dancing with the Stars (season 7) - Weekly scores
| Couple | Pl. | Week | | | | | | | | | | |
| Couple | Pl. | 1 | 2 | 1+2 | 3 | 4 | 5 | 6 | 7 | 8 | 9 | 10 |
|---|---|---|---|---|---|---|---|---|---|---|---|---|
| Bridie & Craig | 1st | 32 | **29**† | 61 | **30**† | **35**† | **36**† | 33+31=**64**† | **38**† | 36+28=64 | 31+35=**66**† | 35+40+40=**115**† (Note: This couple finished in first place.) |
| Anh & Luda | 2nd | 24 | 28 | 52 | 29 | 30 | 27 | 25+31=56 (Note: This couple was in the bottom two, but was not eliminated.) | 27‡ | 21+27=48‡ | 32+34=**66**† | 26+32+35=93‡ (Note: This couple finished in second place.) |
| David & Karina | 3rd | 27 | 27 | 54 | 28 | **35**† | 31 | 29+28=57 | 27‡ | 38+29=**67**† | 31+23=54‡ (Note: This couple was eliminated.) | |
| Patti & Sandro | 4th | **34**† | 28 | **62**† | **30**† | 31 | 28 | 32+29=61 | 28 | 28+21=49 | | |
| Mark & Linda | 5th | 27 | 22 | 49 | 18‡ | 25‡ | 29 | 24+28=52 | 31 | | | |
| James & Olya | 6th | 27 | **29**† | 56 | 23 | 28 | 18 | 20+24=44‡ | | | | |
| Jessica & Serghei | 7th | 24 | 23 | 47 | **30**† | 29 | 14‡ | | | | | |
| Elka & Michael | 8th | 23 | 22 | 45 | 28 | 27 | | | | | | |
| Corinne & Csaba | 9th | 24 | 25 | 49 | 28 | | | | | | | |
| Michael & Eliza | 10th | 19‡ | 19‡ | 38‡ | | | | | | | | |

== Weekly scores ==
Unless indicated otherwise, individual judges scores in the chart below (given in parentheses) are listed in this order from left to right: Todd McKenney, Helen Richey, Paul Mercurio, Mark Wilson.

=== Week 1 ===
Couples performed either the cha-cha-cha or the quickstep. Couples are listed in the order they performed.

| Couple | Scores | Dance | Music |
|---|---|---|---|
| Anh & Luda | 24 (6, 6, 6, 6) | Cha-cha-cha | "Kung Fu Fighting" — Bus Stop, feat. Carl Douglas |
| Elka & Michael | 23 (5, 6, 6, 6) | Quickstep | "That Mellow Saxophone" — Brian Setzer Orchestra |
| Mark & Linda | 27 (6, 7, 7, 7) | Cha-cha-cha | "I Like It Like That" — Tito Puente |
| David & Karina | 27 (6, 7, 7, 7) | Quickstep | "The Continental" — Fred Astaire |
| Michael & Eliza | 19 (4, 5, 5, 5) | Quickstep | "Sing You Sinners" — Tony Bennett, feat. John Legend |
| Corinne & Csaba | 24 (5, 6, 6, 7) | Cha-cha-cha | "U and Ur Hand" — Pink |
| Bridie & Craig | 32 (8, 8, 8, 8) | Quickstep | "Big and Bad" — Big Bad Voodoo Daddy |
| James & Olya | 27 (7, 7, 6, 7) | Cha-cha-cha | "Destination Calabria" ― Alex Gaudino, feat. Crystal Waters |
| Jessica & Serghei | 24 (6, 6, 6, 6) | Quickstep | "Heart of Glass" — The Puppini Sisters |
| Patti & Sandro | 34 (9, 8, 8, 9) | Cha-cha-cha | "Mambo Italiano" — Bette Midler |

=== Week 2 ===
Couples performed either the jive or the tango. Couples are listed in the order they performed.

| Couple | Scores | Dance | Music | Result |
|---|---|---|---|---|
| David & Karina | 27 (6, 8, 6, 7) | Jive | "I'm A Believer" — The Monkees | Safe |
| Corinne & Csaba | 25 (6, 6, 7, 6) | Tango | "Nightfall" — Stanley Black | Safe |
| Michael & Eliza | 19 (2, 5, 6, 6) | Jive | "Everybody Needs Somebody to Love" — Blues Brothers | Eliminated |
| James & Olya | 29 (6, 8, 8, 7) | Tango | "In Tango" — Bajofondo Tango Club | Safe |
| Jessica & Serghei | 23 (5, 6, 6, 6) | Jive | "Reet Petite" — Jackie Wilson | Safe |
| Anh & Luda | 28 (7, 7, 6, 8) | Tango | "Hernando's Hideaway" — Alma Cogan | Safe |
| Elka & Michael | 22 (6, 6, 5, 5) | Jive | "Tall Skinny Mama" — The Swing Cats | Bottom two |
| Patti & Sandro | 28 (7, 7, 6, 8) | Tango | "Argentino Paso" ― Carlos Ortega | Safe |
| Bridie & Craig | 29 (8, 7, 7, 7) | Jive | "Johnny B. Goode" — Chuck Berry & "Good Times" — INXS, feat. Jimmy Barnes | Safe |
| Mark & Linda | 22 (5, 6, 6, 5) | Tango | "Toreador Song" — Georges Bizet | Safe |

=== Week 3 ===
Couples performed either the foxtrot or the salsa. Couples are listed in the order they performed.

| Couple | Scores | Dance | Music | Result |
|---|---|---|---|---|
| Corinne & Csaba | 28 (7, 7, 7, 7) | Salsa | "Can't Touch It" — Ricki-Lee Coulter | Eliminated |
| Bridie & Craig | 30 (7, 8, 7, 8) | Foxtrot | "They Can't Take That Away from Me" — Diana Krall | Safe |
| Anh & Luda | 29 (6, 7, 8, 8) | Salsa | "Bombón de Azúcar" — La Secta | Safe |
| Elka & Michael | 28 (7, 7, 7, 7) | Foxtrot | "Blue Moon" — Frank Sinatra | Bottom two |
| Mark & Linda | 18 (3, 6, 4, 5) | Salsa | "Esa Morena" — Ozomatli | Safe |
| Jessica & Serghei | 30 (8, 7, 8, 7) | Foxtrot | "Lovecats" — The Cure | Safe |
| Patti & Sandro | 30 (7, 8, 7, 8) | Salsa | "La Bamba" — Selena | Safe |
| David & Karina | 28 (7, 8, 6, 7) | Foxtrot | "Witchcraft" — Steve Tyrell | Safe |
| James & Olya | 23 (4, 7, 7, 5) | Salsa | "Quimbara" — Celia Cruz | Safe |

=== Week 4 ===
Couples performed either the paso doble or the waltz. Couples are listed in the order they performed.

| Couple | Scores | Dance | Music | Result |
|---|---|---|---|---|
| Elka & Michael | 27 (6, 7, 7, 7) | Paso doble | "España cañí" — Tokyo Kosei Wind Orchestra | Eliminated |
| Mark & Linda | 25 (6, 7, 6, 6) | Waltz | "Sunrise, Sunset" — Jerry Bock & Sheldon Harnick | Safe |
| James & Olya | 28 (7, 7, 7, 7) | Waltz | "Adiemus" — Karl Jenkins | Safe |
| David & Karina | 35 (8, 9, 9, 9) | Paso doble | "Romeo & Juliet Op. 64" — Sergei Prokofiev | Safe |
| Patti & Sandro | 31 (7, 8, 8, 8) | Waltz | "Jesse" — Janis Ian | Safe |
| Bridie & Craig | 35 (9, 8, 9, 9) | Paso doble | "Canción del Mariachi" — Los Lobos | Safe |
| Anh & Luda | 30 (8, 7, 8, 7) | Waltz | "I Will Always Return" — Dancehouse | Safe |
| Jessica & Serghei | 29 (7, 7, 8, 7) | Paso doble | "Theatres des Vampires" — Elliot Goldenthal & "XRCD" — Elliot Goldenthal | Bottom two |

=== Week 5 ===
Couples performed either the rumba or the samba. Couples are listed in the order they performed.

| Couple | Scores | Dance | Music | Result |
|---|---|---|---|---|
| Patti & Sandro | 28 (7, 7, 6, 8) | Samba | "I, Yi, Yi, Yi, Yi (I Like You Very Much)" — Carmen Miranda | Bottom two |
| James & Olya | 18 (3, 6, 4, 5) | Rumba | "She's Like the Wind" — Vibekingz | Safe |
| Jessica & Serghei | 14 (2, 4, 4, 4) | Samba | "Right About Now" — Mousse T | Eliminated |
| David & Karina | 31 (7, 8, 8, 8) | Rumba | "La Paloma" — Placido Domingo | Safe |
| Mark & Linda | 29 (7, 8, 7, 7) | Samba | "Conga" — Gloria Estefan | Safe |
| Bridie & Craig | 36 (9, 8, 9, 10) | Rumba | "Time After Time" — Eva Cassidy | Safe |
| Anh & Luda | 27 (7, 7, 6, 7) | Samba | "Rumbakalao" — Azuquita | Safe |

=== Week 6 ===
Each couple performed one new routine, and then all couples participated in a group Bollywood routine for individual points. Couples are listed in the order they performed.

| Couple | Scores | Dance | Music | Result |
|---|---|---|---|---|
| James & Olya | 20 (5, 5, 5, 5) | Foxtrot | "The Way You Make Me Feel" — Michael Jackson | Eliminated |
| Mark & Linda | 24 (4, 7, 6, 7) | Rumba | "Little Wonders" — Rob Thomas | Safe |
| Patti & Sandro | 32 (8, 8, 8, 8) | Paso doble | "Y viva España" — Manolo Escobar | Safe |
| Bridie & Craig | 33 (8, 9, 8, 8) | Waltz | "I Had a Dream" — Joss Stone | Safe |
| Anh & Luda | 25 (6, 7, 6, 6) | Jive | "Wake Up Jeff" & "Hot Potato" — The Wiggles | Bottom two |
| David & Karina | 29 (6, 8, 7, 8) | Tango | "Ecstasy" — Geoff Love | Safe |
| James & Olya | 24 (6, 6, 6, 6) | Group; Bollywood | "Bollywood Remix" — Krishnamoorthy, Sangathia & Chorus | |
| Mark & Linda | 28 (8, 7, 6, 7) | Group; Bollywood | "Bollywood Remix" — Krishnamoorthy, Sangathia & Chorus | |
| Patti & Sandro | 29 (7, 8, 7, 7) | Group; Bollywood | "Bollywood Remix" — Krishnamoorthy, Sangathia & Chorus | |
| Bridie & Craig | 31 (7, 8, 8, 8) | Group; Bollywood | "Bollywood Remix" — Krishnamoorthy, Sangathia & Chorus | |
| Anh & Luda | 31 (8, 8, 7, 8) | Group; Bollywood | "Bollywood Remix" — Krishnamoorthy, Sangathia & Chorus | |
| David & Karina | 28 (6, 7, 7, 8) | Group; Bollywood | "Bollywood Remix" — Krishnamoorthy, Sangathia & Chorus | |

=== Week 7 ===
Couples are listed in the order they performed.

| Couple | Scores | Dance | Music | Result |
|---|---|---|---|---|
| David & Karina | 27 (7, 7, 6, 7) | Salsa | "It Had Better Be Tonight" — Michael Bublé | Safe |
| Anh & Luda | 27 (8, 6, 7, 6) | Foxtrot | "I'm Your Man" — Leonard Cohen | Safe |
| Mark & Linda | 31 (7, 8, 8, 8) | Quickstep | "The Dirty Boogie" — Brian Setzer Orchestra | Eliminated |
| Bridie & Craig | 38 (10, 9, 9, 10) | Samba | "Le Serpent" — Guem et Zaka | Safe |
| Patti & Sandro | 28 (7, 7, 7, 7) | Foxtrot | "The Locomotion" — Kylie Minogue | Bottom two |

=== Week 8 ===
Each couple performed two routines, one of which was a disco routine. Couples are listed in the order they performed.

| Couple | Scores | Dance | Music | Result |
|---|---|---|---|---|
| Bridie & Craig | 36 (9, 9, 9, 9) | Tango | "Olé Guapa" — André Rieu | Safe |
| Bridie & Craig | 28 (6, 8, 6, 8) | Disco | "You Should Be Dancing" — Bee Gees | Safe |
| Anh & Luda | 21 (6, 6, 4, 5) | Rumba | "More Than Words" — Extreme | Bottom two |
| Anh & Luda | 27 (6, 6, 7, 8) | Disco | "Shake Your Groove Thing" — Peaches & Herb | Bottom two |
| David & Karina | 38 (9, 10, 10, 9) | Waltz | "Gymnopédie" — Erik Satie | Safe |
| David & Karina | 29 (5, 8, 10, 6) | Disco | "Play That Funky Music" — Wild Cherry | Safe |
| Patti & Sandro | 28 (7, 7, 7, 7) | Jive | "You Can't Stop the Beat" — from Hairspray | Eliminated |
| Patti & Sandro | 21 (5, 5, 5, 6) | Disco | "I Will Survive" — Young Divas | Eliminated |

=== Week 9 ===
Each couple performed two routines, one of which was the Argentine tango. Couples are listed in the order they performed.

| Couple | Scores | Dance | Music | Result |
|---|---|---|---|---|
| Anh & Luda | 32 (8, 8, 8, 8) | Quickstep | "When You're Smiling" — Andy Williams | Bottom two |
| Anh & Luda | 34 (9, 8, 9, 8) | Argentine tango | "Quejas de Bandoneon" — Astor Piazzolla | Bottom two |
| David & Karina | 31 (6, 8, 8, 9) | Argentine tango | "Verano Porteño" — Astor Piazzolla | Eliminated |
| David & Karina | 23 (5, 5, 6, 7) | Samba | "Sweetheart from Venezuela" — Harry Belafonte | Eliminated |
| Bridie & Craig | 31 (7, 8, 7, 9) | Salsa | "Micaela" — Sonora Carruseles | Safe |
| Bridie & Craig | 35 (9, 9, 8, 9) | Argentine tango | "The Addams Family Theme Song" & "El Vaquero" — Prandi Sound Tango Ensemble | Safe |

=== Week 10 ===
Each couple performed three routines: one unlearned dance, their favourite dance of the season, and their freestyle routine. Couples are listed in the order they performed.

| Couple | Scores | Dance | Music | Result |
|---|---|---|---|---|
| Bridie & Craig | 35 (9, 9, 8, 9) | Cha-cha-cha | "Respect" — Aretha Franklin | Winners |
| Bridie & Craig | 40 (10, 10, 10, 10) | Samba | "Le Serpent" — Guem et Zaka | Winners |
| Bridie & Craig | 40 (10, 10, 10, 10) | Freestyle | "Kothbiro" — Ayub Ogada | Winners |
| Anh & Luda | 26 (6, 6, 7, 7) | Paso doble | "Wall Breached" — Harry Gregson-Williams | Runners-up |
| Anh & Luda | 32 (7, 8, 8, 9) | Samba | "Rumbakalao" — Azuquita | Runners-up |
| Anh & Luda | 35 (8, 9, 9, 9) | Freestyle | "Livin' la Vida Loca" — Ricky Martin | Runners-up |

== Dance chart ==
- Week 1: Cha-Cha-Cha or quickstep
- Week 2: Jive or tango
- Week 3: Foxtrot or salsa
- Week 4: Paso doble or waltz
- Week 5: Rumba or samba
- Week 6: One unlearned dance & group Bollywood
- Week 7: One unlearned dance
- Week 8: One unlearned dance & disco
- Week 9: One unlearned dance & Argentine tango
- Week 10: One unlearned dance, favourite dance of the season & freestyle

Dancing with the Stars (season 7) - Dance chart
| Couple | Week | | | | | | | | | | | | | | |
| Couple | 1 | 2 | 3 | 4 | 5 | 6 | | 7 | 8 | | 9 | | 10 | | |
|---|---|---|---|---|---|---|---|---|---|---|---|---|---|---|---|
| Bridie & Craig | Quickstep | Jive | Foxtrot | Paso doble | Rumba | Waltz | Group; Bollywood | Samba | Tango | Disco | Salsa | Argentine tango | Cha-cha-cha | Samba | Freestyle |
| Anh & Luda | Cha-cha-cha | Tango | Salsa | Waltz | Samba | Jive | Group; Bollywood | Foxtrot | Rumba | Disco | Quickstep | Argentine tango | Paso doble | Samba | Freestyle |
| David & Karina | Quickstep | Jive | Foxtrot | Paso doble | Rumba | Tango | Group; Bollywood | Salsa | Waltz | Disco | Argentine tango | Samba | | | |
| Patti & Sandro | Cha-cha-cha | Tango | Salsa | Waltz | Samba | Paso doble | Group; Bollywood | Foxtrot | Jive | Disco | | | | | |
| Mark & Linda | Cha-cha-cha | Tango | Salsa | Waltz | Samba | Rumba | Group; Bollywood | Quickstep | | | | | | | |
| James & Olya | Cha-cha-cha | Tango | Salsa | Waltz | Rumba | Foxtrot | Group; Bollywood | | | | | | | | |
| Jessica & Serghei | Quickstep | Jive | Foxtrot | Paso doble | Samba | | | | | | | | | | |
| Elka & Michael | Quickstep | Jive | Foxtrot | Paso doble | | | | | | | | | | | |
| Corinne & Csaba | Cha-cha-cha | Tango | Salsa | | | | | | | | | | | | |
| Michael & Eliza | Quickstep | Jive | | | | | | | | | | | | | |

| Preceded by Dancing with the Stars (Australian season 6) | Dancing with the Stars (Australian version); Season 7 | Succeeded by Dancing with the Stars (Australian season 8) |
