= Trenton Shipley =

Australian Artist, dancer and choreographer

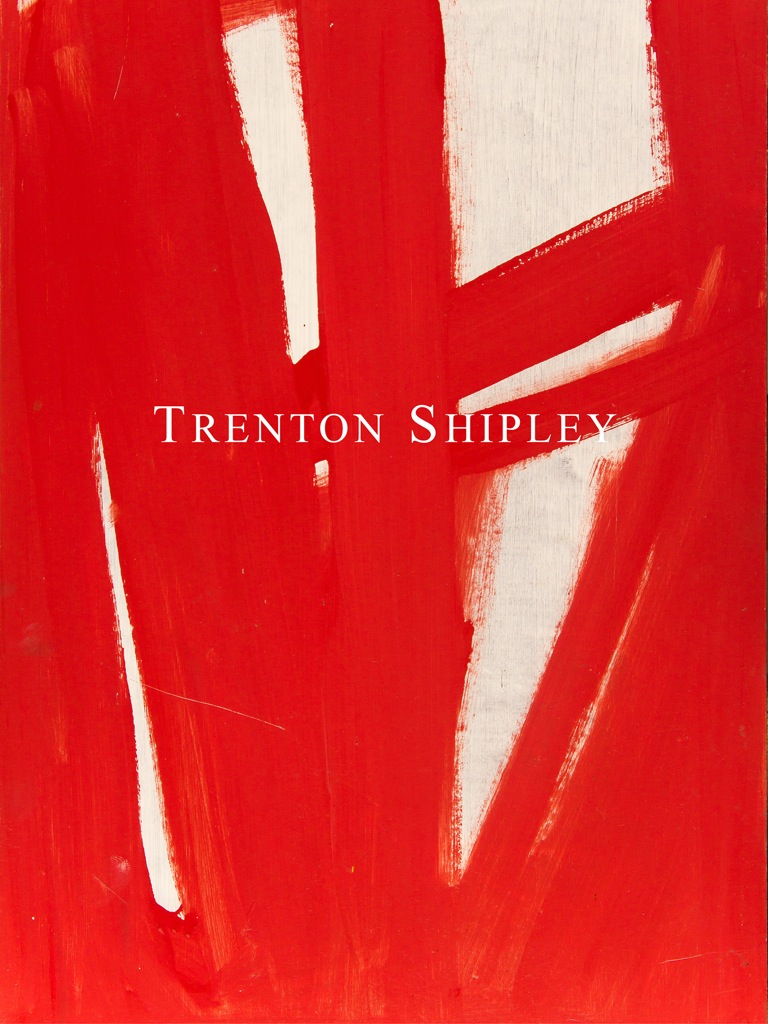
- Trenton Shipley
- Born: 30 October 1973 (age 52); Sydney, Australia
- Education: Julian Aston Art School, Sydney
- Known for: Painting
- Movement: Australian New Wave – Expressionism

Trenton Shipley is an Australian painter and artist. Shipley performs as an actor, dancer and choreographer comprising an international career in theatre, film and television which spans the course of thirty years.

== Art ==
Shipley has held a permanent art studio in Sydney since 2005.

Commencing painting in early adolescence he was captured by the expressive characteristics of colour and figuration.

Shipley’s debut solo exhibition; ‘In Motion - Paintings’, showcased sixty-seven oil paintings by the artist over three gallery levels. The show opened at the expansive Erskine Exhibitions and Events Gallery in October 2012, on Erskine Street Sydney. This inaugural exhibition was followed by four further solo exhibitions held between 2013 and 2019 in Woollahra, The Rocks and Redfern; along with numerous group exhibitions, invitations and prize inclusions.

Shipley when talking about his style of painting says; "I have always been interested in traversing the worlds of the static and dynamic in art." He says of his process; "Painting often feels like a boxing match between the self and my canvas, as I seek out an ultimate truth."

Since 2010 Shipley has produced various entries for the Sulman Prize, the Wynne Prize and the Archibald Prize; including portraits of esteemed Australian painter John Firth-Smith and prize winning Australian playwright and director Michael Gow.

Shipley presented his paintings at The Royal Exhibition Building in Melbourne as well as fulfilling painting engagements overseas during the second half of 2019. The painter held two successful solo exhibitions in Sydney during 2020 - Love, in the March and To Live, in the November. In 2022 he presented a new body of work to the public of Australia with an exhibition titled 'Castles in the Air.'

== Dance ==
Shipley’s credits in dance and choreography include productions such as That’s Dancin’, ABC Television, Legends of Rock and Roll –“Once More with Feeling,” featuring Jerry Lee Lewis, Chuck Berry and The Everly Brothers for Kevin Jacobsen and the Seven Network.^{[2]} Shipley choreographed Five Story’s High for the Sydney Festival; a co-production with Opera Australia and the Sydney Conservatorium of Music, The Four of Us, a short film directed by Juan Baquero; Camino Real written by Tennessee Williams and directed by Mel Shapiro, as well as “They Shoot Horses, Don’t They?”, at the Gardens Theatre for the Queensland University of Technology. On numerous occasions Shipley performed as a dancer at The Logies and The People’s Choice Awards choreographed by Ross Coleman for the Seven Network. Shipley is also known for his outstanding work on Australia's Dancing with the Stars where he choreographed and partnered Seven Network news presenter Chris Bath to the Season 3 Grand Final.

Shipley has held various Ballroom and Latin American dance titles, including; British Junior Finalist, ‘International Championships’ Finalist at The Royal Albert Hall, London; as well as being the Australian Latin American and Ballroom Dance Champion. Shipley has represented Australia on numerous occasions at the World Championships and at a variety of other international Ballroom and Latin American dance events.

== Acting ==
Shipley graduated as an actor from Queensland University of Technology, and went on to further acting training in New York and The Eric Morris Actors Workshop in Los Angeles.

Shipley has worked on a variety of notable projects, some including; Sam Shepard’s American theatre classic Buried Child directed by Michael Gow, The Forest with Bille Brown; a Russian drama written by Alexander Ostrovsky and Shakespeare's Richard II for the Queensland Theatre Company.

Shipley has taught at the Actors Center Australia, Queensland University of Technology and the National Institute of Dramatic Art .
