= Luke Jacobz =

Australian actor

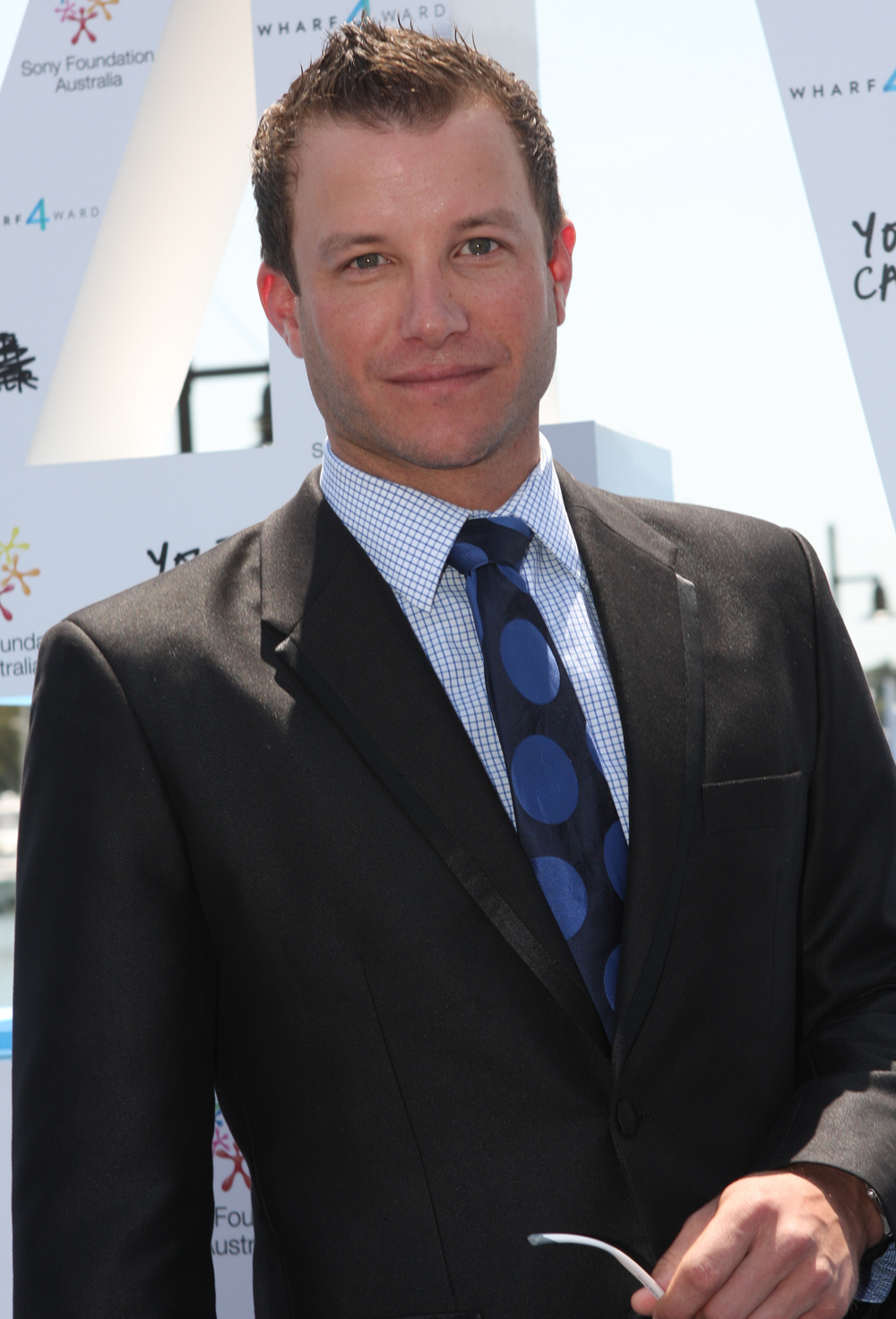
- Born: Luke Jacob Ashwood; 14 February 1981 (age 45); Sydney, Australia
- Occupations: Actor, television presenter
- Years active: 1998–present

Luke Jacobz (born Luke Jacob Ashwood; 14 February 1981) is an Australian actor and television presenter. He is best known for his roles as Zac Croft in Heartbreak High, Patrick Brewer in McLeod's Daughters, Angelo Rosetta in Home and Away, and as presenter of the Australian version of The X Factor.

== Early life ==
Jacobz was born Luke Jacob Ashwood. Jacobz is a screen name, derived from adding a 'z' to the actor's middle name. He has one brother. Jacobz appeared in a high school production of The Man of Steel in 1995.

== Career ==
Jacobz came to public attention when he starred as Zac Croft for two years on the Australian teen drama television series Heartbreak High. He later moved on to hosting television programs The Big Arvo and Popstars Live.

Jacobz made a return to acting in McLeod's Daughters as Patrick Brewer, appearing on the show between 2005 and 2008. From 2008 until 2011, Jacobz played Angelo Rosetta in the Australian soap opera Home and Away. He was only originally supposed to be in the serial for six months, but proved popular with viewers. Jacobz's character was written out after producers felt that he had done everything they wanted him to do.

In 2008, Jacobz was crowned Dancing with the Stars champion along with dancer and mentor Luda Kroitor.

Jacobz hosted seasons 2 through to 7 of The X Factor, from 2010 to 2015.

After the death of his father, Jacobz left Australia for Los Angeles. He struggled to find steady work and returned to Australia in 2017 to host Instant Hotel. He was replaced by Laurence Llewelyn-Bowen in 2018, however, he admitted "They needed someone with an eye for design. I'm not a home builder, I'm a host. If I was replaced by another host, I'd be upset."

In 2019 Jacobz was a contestant in the fifth Australian season of I'm A Celebrity...Get Me Out of Here! He was eliminated along with Angie Kent in a double elimination, making them the ninth and tenth contestants to leave the jungle.

From 13 August 2020, he reprised his role of Angelo Rosetta and returned to Home and Away in a recurring role. He departed the series on 26 November 2020. Jacobz appears in James Robert Woods's dark satire film The Birthday Trip (film).

== Personal life ==
Jacobz has ADHD. His father John Ashwood died of brain cancer in 2015.

He previously dated his Dancing with the Stars partner Luda Kroitor. In 2018, Jacobz got engaged to his partner Raychel Stuart. The couple married in Centennial Park in June 2023, after they had to postpone their original wedding plans twice due to the COVID-19 pandemic. The following month, they announced they were expecting their first child, and Stuart gave birth to their daughter on 14 November 2023.

Jacobz was charged with drunk driving on 31 May 2015 in Sydney, returning a 0.116 reading, well above the 0.05 limit. In court, he pleaded guilty and lost his licence for 12 months and was fined AU$700.

== Filmography ==
Year	Title	Role	Notes
1997	Home and Away	Student	Guest; as Luke Ashwood
1997	Heartbreak High	Homeless Youth	Guest; as Luke Ashwood
1998	Home and Away	Chris Brown	Guest; as Luke Ashwood
1999	Home and Away	Lucas	Guest; as Luke Jacobs
1999	Heartbreak High	Zac Croft	Main cast
2005–2009	McLeod's Daughters	Patrick Brewer	Season 5 (guest), Season 6–8 (main cast)
2008–2011, 2020	Home and Away	Angelo Rosetta	Season 21–24 (main cast), Season 33 (recurring)
2023	Paper Dolls	Zane	Episode: "We're on Tour, Bitches"
2024	Slider	Nicky	Episode: "Pitch Wars"
2026	The Birthday Trip (film)	Lars Jansen	Formerly titled Moonrise Over Knights Hill

=== Self appearances ===
Year	Title	Role	Notes
2001–2005	The Big Arvo	Presenter	
2004	Popstars Live	Host	
2008	The Singing Bee	Himself	Contestant
2008	Hole in the Wall	Himself	Guys Vs Gals, On Guys Team
2009	Beauty and the Geek Australia	Judge	1 Episode
2010–2015	The X Factor (Australia)	Host	Seasons 2–7
2017	Instant Hotel	Host	Season 1
2019	I'm a Celebrity...Get Me Out of Here!	Himself	Contestant
2019	The Proposal	Host	Season 1 (8 episodes)
2008, 2021	Dancing with the Stars	Himself	Winner of Season 8 Season 18 All Star

== Awards ==
In 2010, Jacobz was nominated for the Silver Logie Award for the most popular actor for his role on Home and Away.

Preceded by Bridie Carter & Craig Monley	Dancing with the Stars (Australia) winner Season 8 (Late 2008 with Luda Kroitor)	Succeeded by Adam Brand & Jade Hatcher
