= Jade Hatcher =

Australian dancer (born 1990)

Jade Hatcher (born 15 January 1990) is an Australian dancer. She competed as a professional dancer on multiple seasons of Australia's Dancing with the Stars, winning in 2009. In 2017, she opened her own dance studio, Hatcher Dance.

== Early life ==
Hatcher's parents Gary and Babette were professional dancers. Hatcher began dancing at her family's dance studio at age 3.

== Career ==
Hatcher competed as in Latin and ballroom dance, starting in 2002. Her last Dancesport competition results were in December 2007.

Hatcher joined Australia's Dancing with the Stars at age 19, making her the youngest professional dancer on the show. For the 2009 series, she was paired with country singer Adam Brand. Brand and Hatcher were the winners of the series. In 2011, she partnered professional surfer Mark Occhilupo for season 11. Occhilupo and Hatcher placed ninth in the competition.

Hatcher returned for season 13 in 2013. She was paired with model Zac Stenmark, one of the Stenmark twins. The show increased to two episodes per week. Stenmark accidentally dropped Hatcher during rehearsal, causing torn cartilage in her right hip joint. Dancer Sriani Argaet filled in for Hatcher for the remainder of the week, when Stenmark was eliminated, finishing in sixth place. Hatcher's injury was misdiagnosed at first and required multiple surgeries. For the first three years after surgery Hatcher had difficulty with physical activity such as dancing and walking.

In 2017, Hatcher opened her own studio, Hatcher Dance, in Dee Why. Later that year Hatcher performed at a fundraiser for Cancer Council NSW, marking her return to performing following her 2013 injury.

== Personal life ==
In January 2010, Hatcher became engaged to her Dancing with the Stars partner Adam Brand. The two married in May 2010 and moved to Nashville, Tennessee in the United States. The marriage lasted 18 months and Hatcher returned to Australia.
