= Natalie Lowe =

Australian ballroom dancer (born 1980)

- Born: 15 August 1980 (age 46); Sydney, New South Wales, Australia
- Occupations: Dancer, choreographer
- Years active: 2004–present
- Spouse: James Knibbs
- Children: 2

Natalie Lowe (born 15 August 1980) is an Australian ballroom dancer. She is a four-time Australian ballroom dance champion. Lowe competed on, and won, Australia's Dancing with the Stars with celebrity partner Anthony Koutoufides. She later joined the BBC's Strictly Come Dancing. She competed on Strictly for seven series, leaving after the 2016 series concluded.

== Early life ==
Lowe grew up in Sydney, New South Wales. Lowe's family lived next door to a ballroom dance studio. At age 5, Lowe began taking dance lessons after watching her older brother and sister dance. Lowe went on to become a four-time Australian ballroom dance Champion.

== Career ==
=== Australia's Dancing with the Stars ===
She joined Seven Network's Dancing with the Stars in 2004, partnering athlete Matt Shirvington. She then partnered Ian Roberts, and won the 2006 series with AFL footballer Anthony Koutoufides. Lowe then partnered Home and Away actor Tim Campbell, and, in 2008, partnered boxer Danny Green.

Series	Partner	Place
1	Matt Shirvington	5th
2	Ian Roberts	2nd
5	Anthony Koutoufides	1st
6	Tim Campbell	3rd
8	Danny Green	2nd
20	James Magnussen	10th

Dance	Partner	Highest	Partner	Lowest
Cha-cha-cha				

=== Strictly Come Dancing ===
Highest and lowest scoring performances per dance

Dance	Partner	Highest	Partner	Lowest
American Smooth	Ricky Whittle	39	Michael Vaughan	31
Argentine tango	Ricky Whittle	39	Michael Vaughan	26
Cha-Cha-Cha	Ricky Whittle	39	Michael Vaughan	18
Charleston	Scott Maslen	39	Michael Vaughan	17
Dance a thon	Scott Maslen	2	Michael Vaughan	
Foxtrot	Ricky Whittle	39	Michael Vaughan	25
Jive	Ricky Whittle	39	Michael Vaughan	15
Paso Doble	Scott Maslen; Ricky Whittle	35	Tim Wonnacott	19
Quickstep	Ricky Whittle	40	Audley Harrison	24
Rock'n'Roll	Ricky Whittle	32		
Rumba	Ricky Whittle	32	Greg Rutherford	26
Salsa	Scott Maslen; Ricky Whittle	32	Audley Harrison	23
Samba	Scott Maslen; Ricky Whittle	32	Michael Vaughan	24
Tango	Scott Maslen; Ricky Whittle	35	Ainsley Harriott	20
Viennese Waltz	Scott Maslen	39	Audley Harrison	27
Waltz	Ricky Whittle	38	Michael Vaughan; Audley Harrison	20
Showdance	Ricky Whittle	39	-	-

In 2009, Lowe competed as a new professional dancer on the seventh series of the original British version of Strictly Come Dancing, partnering Hollyoaks' Ricky Whittle. Lowe joined the show with fellow newcomers Aliona Vilani and Katya Virshilas. After their first dance together in front of the judges, Lowe and Whittle were described by head judge Len Goodman as maybe the most formidable couple Strictly Come Dancing had ever seen. Even so, Lowe and Whittle finished second. Lowe competed in the 2010 series partnering Scott Maslen. Lowe and Maslen were eliminated in the semi-final of the competition along with Gavin Henson and Katya Virshilas.

On 15 June 2011, the BBC announced that Lowe would again be one of the professional dancers in the 2011 series of Strictly Come Dancing. She was partnered by Audley Harrison (champion boxer) and they were the sixth couple to leave. In the 2012 tenth series her partner was former England cricket captain Michael Vaughan; they placed 7th. In 2013, it was revealed that Lowe would return for the eleventh series; however she suffered a foot injury during training and was replaced by Aliona Vilani. Lowe returned for the twelfth series, as partner to television presenter Tim Wonnacott. In March 2015 Lowe won comic relief special, 'The People's Strictly', with veteran, Cassidy Little. She also participated in the thirteenth series main series of the show and was partnered with celebrity chef Ainsley Harriott. Harriott and Lowe were eliminated in the fifth week of competition. Lowe then competed again with Little in the 2015 Christmas Special. In Series 14 she was partnered with Olympic long jump champion Greg Rutherford. On May 4, 2017, Lowe announced her departure from the show after seven series.

Series	Partner	Place
7	Ricky Whittle	2nd
8	Scott Maslen	4th
9	Audley Harrison	9th
10	Michael Vaughan	7th
12	Tim Wonnacott	13th
13	Ainsley Harriott	12th
14	Greg Rutherford	7th

=== Strictly Come Dancing performances ===
==== Series 7 – with celebrity dance partner Ricky Whittle ====
Week No.	Dance/Song	Judges' score						Result
Week No.	Dance/Song	Horwood	Bussell	Goodman	Dixon	Tonioli	Total	Result
2	Waltz / "It Is You (I Have Loved)"	8	8	9	8	8	41	Safe
2	Rumba / "Stepping Stone"	8	8	8	8	8	40	Safe
3	Paso Doble / "Spanish Gypsy Dance"	8	9	9	9	9	44	Safe
4	Salsa / "Dancing Machine"	8	8	8	8	8	40	Safe
5	Viennese Waltz / "How Can I Be Sure"	8	9	9	10	9	45	Safe
6	Samba / "Good Lovin'"	8	8	8	8	8	40	Safe
7	Quickstep / "Down with Love"	9	10	10	10	10	49	Safe
8	Tango / "You Really Got Me"	8	9	9	9	9	44	Safe
9	Jive / "Rip It Up (Little Richard song)"	8	8	9	9	9	43	Safe
10	American Smooth / "Over The Rainbow"	9	9	8	10	9	45	Safe
11	Rock'n'Roll / "Hound Dog"	7	8	8	8	8	39	Bottom two
12	Foxtrot / "Too Marvelous for Words"; Cha-Cha-Cha / "Sunshine of Your Love"	9; 9	9; 10	10; 9	10; 10	10; 9	48; 47	Bottom two
13	Waltz / "Kissing You"; Argentine Tango / "Verano Porteno"	9; 9	9; 10	10; 10	9; 10	10; 10	47; 49	Safe
14	Quickstep / "Down with Love"; Lindy Hop / "Sing with a Swing"; Cha-Cha-Cha / "Sunshine of Your Love"; Showdance / "Last Dance"	10; 8; 9; 10	10; 8; 10; 9	10; 9; 9; 10	10; 9; 10; 10	10; 9; 10; 10	50; 43; 48; 49	Runners-Up

==== Series 8 – with celebrity dance partner Scott Maslen ====
Week No.	Dance/Song	Judges' score				Total	Result
Week No.	Dance/Song	Horwood	Goodman	Dixon	Tonioli	Total	Result
1	Waltz / "I Never Loved a Man the Way I Love You"	6	7	8	8	29	None
2	Salsa / "Let's Hear It for the Boy"	8	8	8	8	32	Safe
3	Quickstep / "I Wan'na Be Like You (The Monkey Song)"	8	8	9	9	34	Safe
4	Tango / "Allegretto"	8	9	9	9	35	Safe
5	Viennese Waltz / "I Put a Spell on You"	9	10	10	10	39	Safe
6	Rhumba / "Wishing on a Star"	4	9	7	8	28	Safe
7	Jive / "Hit the Road Jack"	9	10	10	10	39	Safe
8	Samba / "(Your Love Keeps Lifting Me) Higher and Higher"	6	8	9	9	32	Safe
9	American Smooth / "Fly Me to the Moon"	6	7	9	9	31	Safe
10	Paso Doble / "James Bond Theme"	8	9	9	9	35	Bottom two
11	Argentine Tango / "Época"	8	8	8	9	33	Eliminated
11	Swing-athon / "In the Mood"	Awarded	2	Extra	Points	35	Eliminated
11	Charleston / "Anything Goes"	8	9	9	9	35	Eliminated

==== Series 9 – with celebrity dance partner Audley Harrison ====
Week No.	Dance/Song	Judges' score				Total	Result
Week No.	Dance/Song	Horwood	Goodman	Dixon	Tonioli	Total	Result
1	Waltz / "Angel"	3	5	6	6	20	None
2	Salsa / Don't Stop Till You Get Enough	5	6	6	6	23	Bottom two
3	Quickstep / "Too Darn Hot"	5	6	6	7	24	Safe
4	Foxtrot / "I Just Don't Know What to Do with Myself"	6	7	6	6	25	Safe
5	Jive / "Little Shop of Horrors Prologue"	3	6	6	5	20	Bottom two
6	Viennese Waltz / "I'm with You"	5	8	7	7	27	Bottom two
7	Cha-Cha-Cha / "Uptight (Everything's Alright)"	3	6	6	5	20	Eliminated

==== Series 10 – with celebrity dance partner Michael Vaughan ====
Week No.	Dance/Song	Judges' score				Total	Result
Week No.	Dance/Song	Horwood	Bussell	Goodman	Tonioli	Total	Result
1	Waltz / "If You Don't Know Me by Now"	5	5	6	4	20	None
2	Jive / "This Ole House"	2	5	4	4	15	Safe
3	Cha-Cha-Cha / "Hot Stuff"	3	6	6	4	19	Bottom Two
4	Quickstep / "That Old Black Magic"	8	8	8	7	31	Safe
5	Foxtrot / "I Get the Sweetest Feeling"	7	8	8	8	31	Safe
6	Salsa / "I Want You Back"	5	7	7	7	26	Safe
7	American Smooth / "New York, New York"	9	9	9	8	35	Safe
8	Argentine Tango / "Bust Your Windows"	6	7	7	6	26	Bottom Two
9	Samba / "Tequila"	5	7	6	6	24	Eliminated

==== Series 12 – with celebrity dance partner Tim Wonnacott ====
Week No.	Dance/Song	Judges' score				Total	Result
Week No.	Dance/Song	Horwood	Bussell	Goodman	Tonioli	Total	Result
1	Cha-Cha-Cha / "Shop Around"	3	5	5	5	18	None
2	Waltz / "When You Wish upon a Star"	5	6	6	6	23	Safe
3	Charleston / "Money Money"	2	5	5	5	17	Safe
4	Paso Doble / "The Best"	3	6	5	5	19	Eliminated

==== Series 13 – with celebrity dance partner Ainsley Harriott ====
Week No.	Dance/Song	Judges' score				Total	Result
Week No.	Dance/Song	Horwood	Bussell	Goodman	Tonioli	Total	Result
1	Tango / "Voulez-Vous"	4	5	6	5	20	None
2	Salsa / "Don't Touch My Tomatoes"	6	7	7	6	26	Safe
3	Cha-Cha-Cha / "Boogie Wonderland"	3	6	6	5	20	Bottom two
4	Waltz / "What a Wonderful World"	6	7	7	6	26	Safe
5	Jive / "Shake, Rattle and Roll"	4	6	6	5	21	Eliminated

==== Series 14 - with celebrity dance partner Greg Rutherford ====
Week No.	Dance/Song	Judges' score				Total	Result
Week No.	Dance/Song	Horwood	Bussell	Goodman	Tonioli	Total	Result
1	Jive / "Get Ready"	6	7	7	7	27	No Elimination
2	Tango / "Jump"	6	7	6	7	26	Safe
3	American Smooth / "Everything I Do (I Do It For You)"	8	8	8	8	32	Safe
4	Salsa / "Wrapped Up"	7	7	7	7	28	Safe
5	Cha-cha-cha / "We Found Love"	4	6	7	7	24	Safe
6	Rumba / "Bring Me to Life"	4	7	7	8	26	Safe
7	Viennese Waltz / "You Don't Own Me"	8	8	8	8	32	Safe
8	Paso Doble / "Tamacun"	7	8	8	8	31	Bottom Two
9	Quickstep / "Hand Jive"	8	8	8	8	32	Eliminated

=== Other projects ===
Beginning in 2005, Lowe joined the cast of the ballroom dance stage show Burn the Floor. Lowe toured with the show for five years. In March 2013, Lowe launched FitSteps, a dance inspired fitness program, with fellow Strictly professional dancer Ian Waite and former Strictly celebrity Mark Foster.

== Personal life ==
In October 2015, Lowe announced her engagement to company director James Knibbs. Lowe first met Knibbs when they sat opposite each other on a train ride to London. Lowe married Knibbs in July 2018. Lowe gave birth to a baby boy, Jack, in December 2019.
