= Arianne Caoili =

Filipino-Australian chess player (1986–2020)

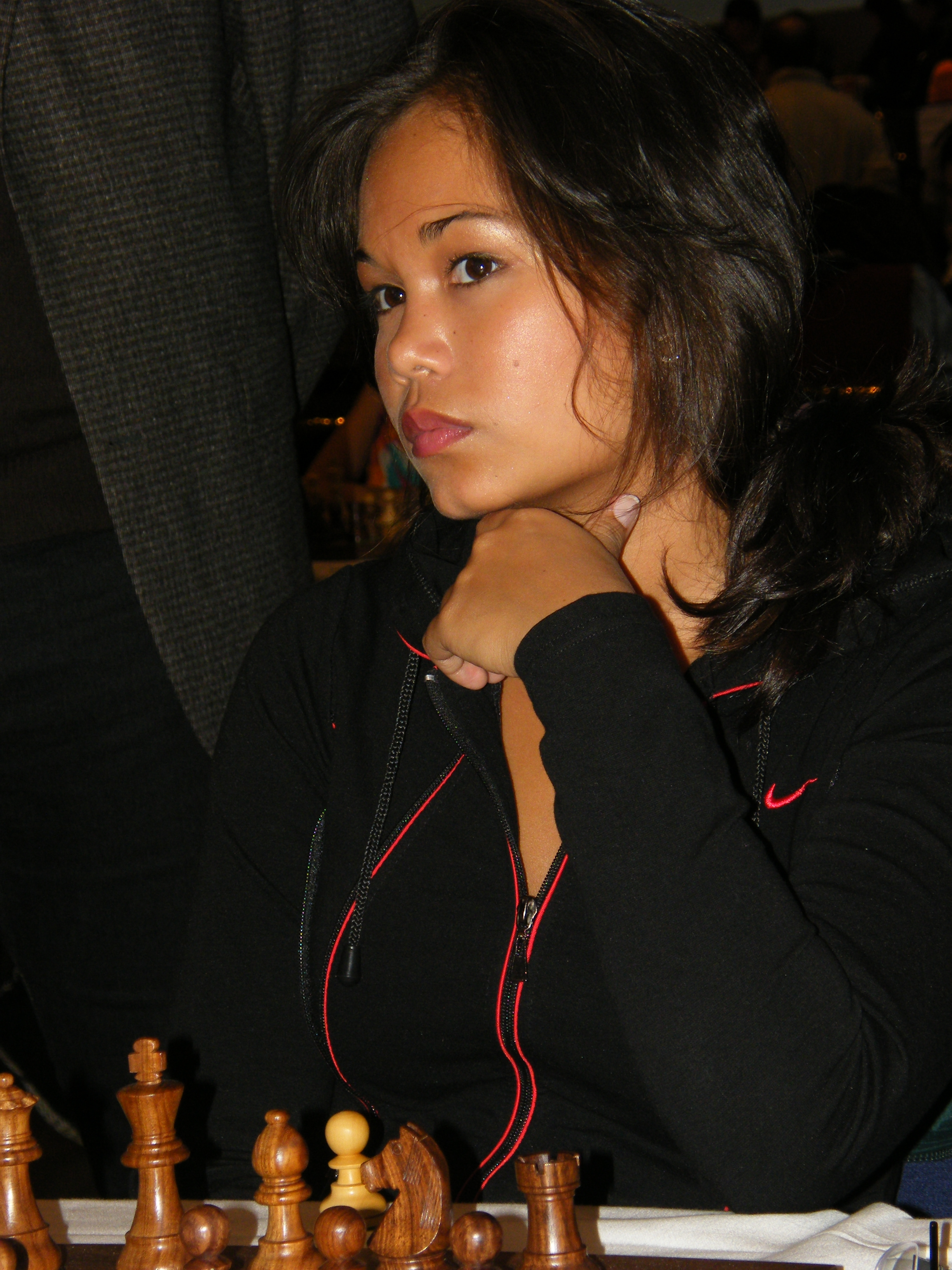
- Caoili in 2008

Personal information
- Born: Arianne Bo Caoili; 22 December 1986 Manila, Philippines
- Died: 30 March 2020 (aged 33) Yerevan, Armenia
- Spouse: Levon Aronian (m. 2017)

Chess career
- Country: Philippines (until 2004); Australia (from 2004)
- Title: Woman International Master (2001)
- Peak rating: 2309 (October 2002)

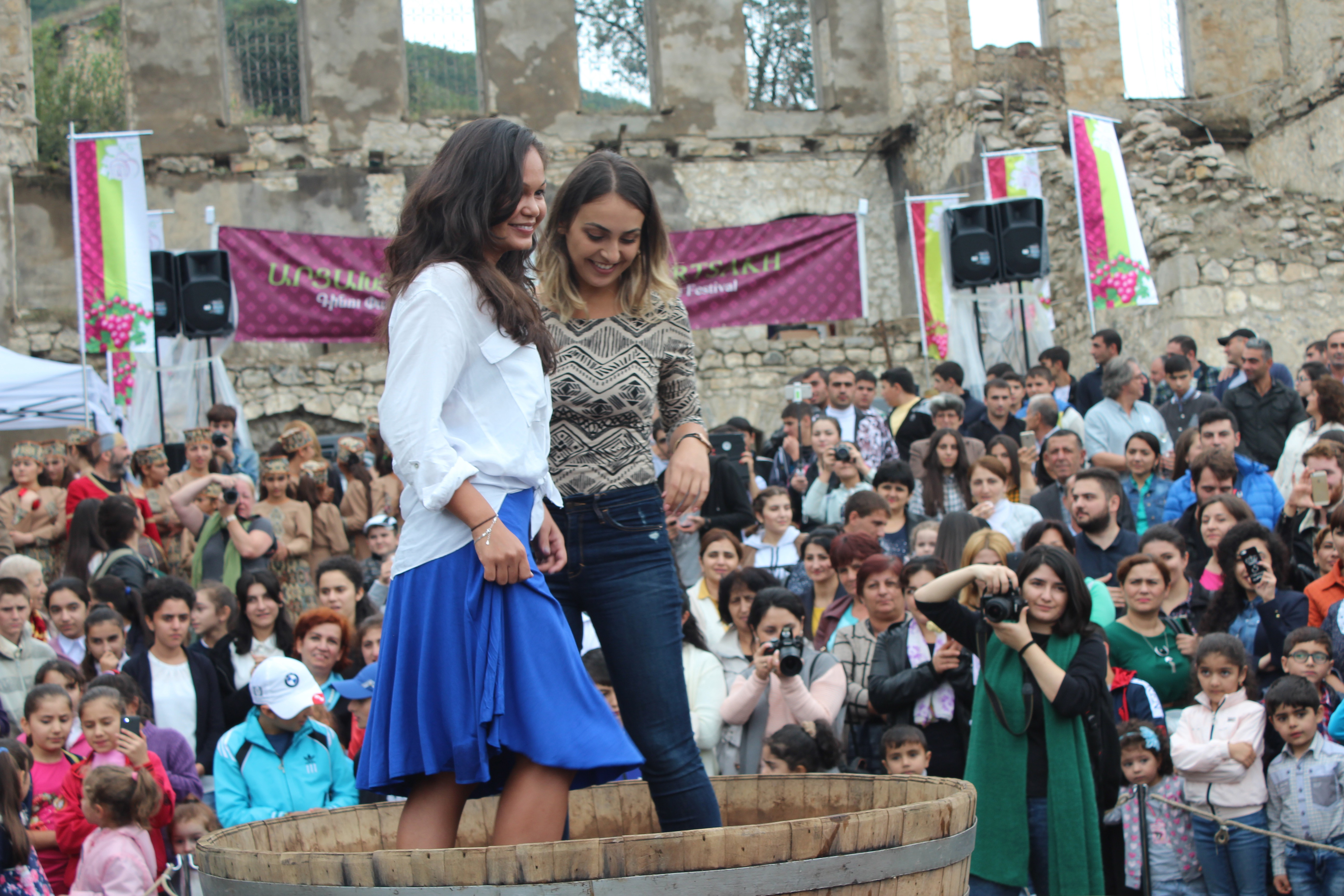
Caoili (left) stomping grapes during the 3rd Artsakh Wine Festival in Togh village. (2016)

Arianne Bo Caoili (/ˈæriːɔːn kaʊˈiːliː/ kah-WEE-lee; 22 December 1986 – 30 March 2020) was a Filipino and Australian chess player. She held the FIDE title of Woman International Master, won the Oceania women's chess championship in 2009 and competed in seven Women's Chess Olympiads. Outside of chess, she was a financial consultant and singer, and served as an advisor to Armenian prime minister Karen Karapetyan.

== Chess ==
Born in Manila, Philippines, Caoili moved to Australia with her family in 1989. She began playing chess at six years old. On 22 December 2000, Caoili won the Asian girls under 16 championship in Bagac, Philippines. The following year, she scored 5½ points out of 9 in the Conca Della Presolana tournament in Italy. Also in 2001, she was awarded the Woman FIDE Master and Woman International Master titles by FIDE. In the FIDE rating list of October 2002, Caoili achieved her peak rating of 2309.

In 2002, Caoili finished 1st Equal at the Australian Masters International Tournament. In 2004 she transferred national federations to represent Australia. In 2009, she won the London Chess Classic Women's Invitational tournament with a score of 8/9, two points ahead of the runner-up. In the same year, Caoili won the Oceania women's zonal tournament and as a result qualified to play in the Women's World Championship 2010. However, she did not appear in the first round in this competition.

Caoili played for the Philippines in the Women's Chess Olympiad in 1998 and 2000. She represented Australia in the same competition in 2004, 2006, 2008, 2010 and 2012.

== Television appearances ==
Caoili was one of the celebrity dancers in the fifth Australian season of Dancing with the Stars. Her professional dance partner was Carmelo Pizzino and she finished as the series' runner-up behind Anthony Koutoufides.

In an episode of the Australian TV show Deal or No Deal she won a car for the home competition entrant.

== Personal life ==
From 2008, Caoili was in a relationship with one of the world's top chess grandmasters, Levon Aronian. They first met in 1996, at the World Youth Chess Championships in Menorca, and became friends in 2006, being introduced by their mutual friend Alex Wohl. Aronian and Caoili became officially engaged in 2015 and were married on 30 September 2017 at the 13th-century Saghmosavank Monastery, with then Armenian President Serzh Sargsyan and his wife Rita Sargsyan in attendance.

She spoke English and Tagalog fluently, and had studied for a Ph.D. at a German university on "Russian foreign policy, especially its economic and business relations with Armenia on a state and individual level". She worked as a consultant for a global consultancy firm. From 2013 until her death in 2020, Caoili lived and worked in Armenia.

Arianne released an EP in 2018, "Hold On", consisting of five tracks, "To Find You" "Summer Days", "On a String", "Hold On" and "Every Little Day". While Arianne did the vocals, the songwriter was Matt Magee. Her debut EP tracks are available on YouTube and Spotify.

Caoili died on 30 March 2020 of injuries from a car crash into a bridge pillar that occurred on 15 March in Yerevan, Armenia.
