= Dancing with the Stars (Australian TV series) season 11 =

Dancing with the Stars
- Season 11
- Hosted by: Daniel MacPherson; Sonia Kruger
- Judges: Joshua Horner; Todd McKenney; Helen Richey
- Celebrity winner: Manu Feildel
- Professional winner: Alana Patience
- No. of episodes: 10

Release
- Original network: Seven Network
- Original release: 8 May – 10 July 2011

Season chronology
- ← Previous; Season 10 Next → Season 12

The eleventh season of the Australian Dancing with the Stars premiered on 8 May 2011 on Channel Seven. Daniel MacPherson and Sonia Kruger returned as hosts, along with judges Todd McKenney and Helen Richey. Australian dancer Joshua Horner joined the judging panel as a replacement for Mark Wilson.

My Kitchen Rules presenter Manu Feildel and Alana Patience were announced as the winners on 10 July 2011, while model Haley Bracken and Aric Yegudkin finished in second place, and singer Damien Leith and Melanie Hooper finished in third.

== Couples ==
This season featured eleven celebrity contestants. The cast for the season was revealed in early April.

| Celebrity | Notability | Professional partner | Status |
|---|---|---|---|
| Nathan Bracken | Cricketer | Masha Belash | Eliminated 1st on 15 May 2011 |
| Jan Stephenson | Professional golfer | Mark Hodge | Eliminated 2nd on 22 May 2011 |
| Mark Occhilupo | Professional surfer | Jade Brand | Eliminated 3rd on 29 May 2011 |
| Dan Ewing | Home and Away actor | Luda Kroitor | Eliminated 4th on 5 June 2011 |
| Brynne Edelsten | Socialite & wife of Geoffrey Edelsten | Arsen Kishishian | Eliminated 5th on 12 June 2011 |
| Nick Bracks | Model | Jessica Raffa | Eliminated 6th on 19 June 2011 |
| Lara Bingle | Model | Carmelo Pizzino | Eliminated 7th on 26 June 2011 |
| Samantha Armytage | Newsreader | Brendon Midson | Eliminated 8th on 3 July 2011 |
| Damien Leith | Singer | Melanie Hooper | Third place on 10 July 2011 |
| Haley Bracken | Model | Aric Yegudkin | Runners-up on 10 July 2011 |
| Manu Feildel | Chef | Alana Patience | Winners on 10 July 2011 |

== Scoring chart ==
The highest score each week is indicated in bold green with a dagger (†), while the lowest score each week is indicated in italicized red with a double-dagger (‡).

Color key:

Winners
Runners-up
Third place
Bottom two
Eliminated

Dancing with the Stars (season 11) - Weekly scores
| Couple | Pl. | Week | | | | | | | | | | |
| Couple | Pl. | 1 | 2 | 1+2 | 3 | 4 | 5 | 6 | 7 | 8 | 9 | 10 |
|---|---|---|---|---|---|---|---|---|---|---|---|---|
| Manu & Alana | 1st | **25**† | 21 | 46 | **27**† | 24 | 21 | 21+10=31 | 20+27=47 | 27+26=53 (Note: This couple was in the bottom two, but was not eliminated.) | 24+25+15=**64**† | 28+27+30=**85**† (Note: This couple finished in first place.) |
| Haley & Aric | 2nd | 23 | 24 | 47 | 23 | **28**† | **26**† | 27+9=**36**† | 24+24=48 | 30+28=**58**† | 30+28=58 | 27+30+25=82 (Note: This couple finished in second place.) |
| Damien & Melanie | 3rd | 23 | **27**† | **50**† | 20 | 27 | **26**† | 22+8=30 | 30+27=**57**† | 21+24=45 | 21+27=48 | 23+27=50 (Note: This couple finished in third place.) |
| Samantha & Brendon | 4th | 15 | 18 | 33 | 15‡ | 11‡ | 20 | 21+7=28 | 19+24=43 | 19+18=37‡ | 17+18=35‡ (Note: This couple was eliminated.) | |
| Lara & Carmelo | 5th | 24 | 21 | 45 | 24 | 17 | 25 | 24+4=28 | 24+24=48 | 19+20=39 | | |
| Nick & Jessica | 6th | 17 | 20 | 37 | 20 | 21 | 21 | 21+6=27 | 12+27=39‡ | | | |
| Brynne & Arsen | 7th | 10 | 14‡ | 24 | 19 | 15 | 11‡ | 13+5=18‡ | | | | |
| Daniel & Luda | 8th | 18 | 16 | 34 | 21 | 19 | 18 | | | | | |
| Mark & Jade | 9th | 7‡ | 15 | 22‡ | 16 | 15 | | | | | | |
| Jan & Mark | 10th | 17 | 22 | 39 | 18 | | | | | | | |
| Nathan & Masha | 11th | 16 | 18 | 34 | | | | | | | | |

== Weekly scores ==
Unless indicated otherwise, individual judges scores in the chart below (given in parentheses) are listed in this order from left to right: Todd McKenney, Helen Richey, Joshua Horner.

=== Week 1 ===
Week 1: Each couple performed either the Cha-Cha-Cha or the Viennese Waltz. Manu Feildel received the highest score of the night with 25/30 for his Viennese Waltz. Mark Occhilupo performed the Cha-Cha-Cha and received the lowest score with 7/30 and the second 1 from Todd McKinney after David Graham in Season 6. Fourteen-year-old Jack Vidgen from Australia's Got Talent performed part of Whitney Houston's "I Have Nothing", following Samantha Armytage and Brendon Midson's performance of the Viennese Waltz to the same song. Irish singer Ronan Keating performed his new single "Walk On By".

Couples performed either the cha-cha-cha or the Viennese waltz. Couples are listed in the order they performed.

| Couple | Scores | Dance | Music |
|---|---|---|---|
| Damien & Melanie | 23 (7, 8, 8) | Cha-cha-cha | "When Love Comes To Town" – U2 |
| Brynne & Arsen | 10 (3, 4, 3) | Cha-cha-cha | "Firework" – Katy Perry |
| Nick & Jessica | 17 (6, 6, 5) | Cha-cha-cha | "Forget You" – Cee Lo Green |
| Nathan & Masha | 16 (4, 6, 6) | Viennese waltz | "Bed of Roses" – Bon Jovi |
| Haley & Aric | 23 (8, 8, 7) | Cha-cha-cha | "Evacuate the Dancefloor" – Cascada |
| Jan & Mark | 17 (6, 7, 4) | Viennese waltz | "She's Always A Woman" – Billy Joel |
| Daniel & Luda | 18 (5, 7, 6) | Cha-cha-cha | "Yeah 3x" – Chris Brown |
| Samantha & Brendon | 15 (5, 5, 5) | Viennese waltz | "I Have Nothing" – Whitney Houston |
| Mark & Jade | 7 (1, 3, 3) | Cha-cha-cha | "Out of Mind, Out of Sight" – Models |
| Manu & Alana | 25 (8, 8, 9) | Viennese waltz | "What's New Pussycat?" – Tom Jones |
| Lara & Carmelo | 24 (8, 8, 8) | Viennese waltz | "Cry" – Kelly Clarkson |

=== Week 2 ===
Week 2: All couples that danced the Cha-Cha-Cha in the previous week danced the Foxtrot, and those who danced the Viennese Waltz danced the Jive. Damien Leith received three 9's, and the highest score of the night for his foxtrot, scoring 27/30. Brynne Edelsten received the lowest score, earning a 14/30 for her foxtrot. Despite being third on the judges leaderboard with a 22/30 for her jive, Jan Stephenson was in the bottom two, along with Nathan Bracken who scored an 18/30. Nathan Bracken and his partner Masha Belash were the first couple eliminated.

Couples performed either the foxtrot or the jive. Couples are listed in the order they performed.

| Couple | Scores | Dance | Music | Result |
|---|---|---|---|---|
| Samantha & Brendon | 18 (6, 6, 6) | Jive | "Hanky Panky" – Madonna | Safe |
| Nathan & Masha | 18 (5, 7, 6) | Jive | "Crazy Little Thing Called Love" – Queen | Eliminated |
| Nick & Jessica | 20 (6, 7, 7) | Foxtrot | "Cooler Than Me" – Mike Posner | Safe |
| Haley & Aric | 24 (8, 8, 8) | Foxtrot | "Who Says?" – Selena Gomez | Safe |
| Mark & Jade | 15 (3, 6, 6) | Foxtrot | "All of Me" – Michael Bublé | Safe |
| Manu & Alana | 21 (7, 7, 7) | Jive | "Ça Plane Pour Moi" – Plastic Bertrand | Safe |
| Jan & Mark | 22 (8, 7, 7) | Jive | "Proud Mary" – Tina Turner | Bottom two |
| Lara & Carmelo | 21 (7, 7, 7) | Jive | "Fishies" – The Cat Empire | Safe |
| Daniel & Luda | 16 (6, 5, 5) | Foxtrot | "Need You Now" – Lady Antebellum | Safe |
| Brynne & Arsen | 14 (4, 5, 5) | Foxtrot | "You're The Boss" – Elvis Presley | Safe |
| Damien & Melanie | 27 (9, 9, 9) | Foxtrot | "Grenade" – Bruno Mars | Safe |

=== Week 3 ===
Week 3: All couples danced either a Samba, Waltz or Argentine Tango. All of the couples which had the samba struggled a lot, while those with the Argentine tango achieved good scores. Manu Feildel received the highest score of the night for his Argentine tango, scoring 27/30. Samantha Armytage and Brendon Midson received the lowest score of the night, with 15/30 for their samba. Oscar Award-winning singer and actress Jennifer Hudson performed two songs, singer James Blunt also performed his new song, and Australian icon Olivia Newton-John provided special commentary on all the dances. Lara and Carmello received their highest scores so far (and the second highest score of the night), but found herself in the bottom two with Jan Stephenson. Golfing legend Jan Stephenson and her partner Mark Hodge were the second couple eliminated.

Couples performed either the Argentine tango, samba, or the waltz. Couples are listed in the order they performed.

| Couple | Scores | Dance | Music | Result |
|---|---|---|---|---|
| Jan & Mark | 18 (6, 6, 6) | Samba | "Copacabana" — Barry Manilow | Eliminated |
| Mark & Jade | 16 (4, 6, 6) | Waltz | "What the World Needs Now Is Love" — Burt Bacharach | Safe |
| Daniel & Luda | 21 (7, 7, 7) | Samba | "Hey Mama" — The Black Eyed Peas | Safe |
| Haley & Aric | 23 (7, 8, 8) | Argentine tango | "Sweet Dreams (Are Made of This)" — Tanghetto | Safe |
| Damien & Melanie | 20 (5, 7, 8) | Samba | "Love Is in the Air" — John Paul Young | Safe |
| Nick & Jessica | 20 (6, 7, 7) | Waltz | "At This Moment" — Billy Vera and the Beaters | Safe |
| Samantha & Brendon | 15 (5, 5, 5) | Samba | "Eso Beso" — Emma Bunton | Safe |
| Lara & Carmelo | 24 (8, 8, 8) | Argentine tango | "Suite Punta del Este" — Astor Piazzolla | Bottom two |
| Brynne & Arsen | 19 (6, 6, 7) | Waltz | "It is You (I Have Loved)" — Dana Glover | Safe |
| Manu & Alana | 27 (9, 9, 9) | Argentine tango | "La Cumparsita" — Gerardo Matos Rodríguez | Safe |

=== Week 4 ===
Week 4: All couples danced either the Rumba or the Quickstep. Haley Bracken received the first ten of the series from judge Todd McKenney, also gaining the highest score of the night, with a 28/30. Samantha Armytage received the lowest score of the night for a second week in a row, scoring an 11/30 for her rumba. Jessica Mauboy and Stan Walker performed their latest duet hit, entitled What Happened To Us?. Daniel Ewing and Luda Kroiter were in the bottom two, along with Mark and Jade. After scoring second lowest on the leaderboard, retired professional surfer Mark Occhilupo and his partner Jade Brand were the third couple eliminated.

Couples performed either the quickstep or the rumba. Couples are listed in the order they performed.

| Couple | Scores | Dance | Music | Result |
|---|---|---|---|---|
| Daniel & Luda | 19 (6, 7, 6) | Rumba | "Just the Way You Are" — Bruno Mars | Bottom two |
| Samantha & Brendon | 11 (2, 4, 5) | Rumba | "Chasing Pavements" — Adele | Safe |
| Damien & Melanie | 27 (9, 9, 9) | Quickstep | "Sing, Sing, Sing" — Benny Goodman and His Orchestra | Safe |
| Nick & Jessica | 21 (6, 7, 8) | Rumba | "Angels" — Robbie Williams | Safe |
| Mark & Jade | 15 (4, 5, 6) | Quickstep | "You Can't Hurry Love" — The Supremes | Eliminated |
| Haley & Aric | 28 (10, 9, 9) | Rumba | "Russian Roulette" — Rihanna | Safe |
| Manu & Alana | 24 (8, 8, 8) | Quickstep | "Do Your Thing" – Basement Jaxx | Safe |
| Lara & Carmello | 17 (5, 6, 6) | Quickstep | "Show Me How You Burlesque" — Christina Aguilera | Safe |
| Brynne & Arsen | 15 (5, 5, 5) | Quickstep | "Suddenly I See" — KT Tunstall | Safe |

=== Week 5 ===
Week 5: Each couple performed an unlearned dance to the theme of popular TV show. Frontrunners Damien Leith and Haley Bracken both tied for the top spot, each scoring a 26/30 for their respective jives. Brynne Edelsten received the lowest score of the night, an 11/30, with an I Dream of Jeannie themed samba. Brian McFadden performed his new single, That's How Life Goes. Because of her low scores, socialite Brynne Edelsten and her partner Arsen Kishishian were in the bottom two, along with Dan and Luda. After being in the bottom two last week, Home and Away actor Daniel Ewing and his partner Luda Kroiter became the fourth couple eliminated.

Couples are listed in the order they performed.

| Couple | Scores | Dance | Television theme song | Result |
|---|---|---|---|---|
| Haley & Aric | 26 (9, 9, 8) | Jive | Happy Days | Safe |
| Nick & Jessica | 21 (7, 7, 7) | Tango | Get Smart | Safe |
| Daniel & Luda | 18 (6, 6, 6) | Quickstep | Friends | Eliminated |
| Damien & Melanie | 26 (9, 8, 9) | Jive | The Monkees | Safe |
| Samantha & Brendon | 20 (7, 6, 7) | Quickstep | Bewitched | Safe |
| Brynne & Arsen | 11 (3, 4, 4) | Samba | I Dream of Jeannie | Bottom two |
| Manu & Alana | 21 (6, 7, 8) | Foxtrot | The Addams Family | Safe |
| Lara & Carmelo | 25 (9, 8, 8) | Foxtrot | The Pink Panther | Safe |

=== Week 6 ===
Week 6: Each couple performed an unlearned rock themed dance, as well as a rock and roll marathon dance. Haley Bracken received the highest first round score, a 27/30, despite receiving criticism from Todd McKenney over her previous dance experience. Once again, Brynne Edelsten received the lowest first round score, with a 13/30. During the rock and roll marathon, Carmello dropped Lara, which led to them being eliminated first. Eventually, Manu and Alana were the winners of the dance, and received an additional 10 points added to their first round score. American Idol winner Carrie Underwood performed her new single, Undo It. Lara Bingle and Brynne Edelsten were both in the bottom two, each of them being in the bottom two twice so far. Socialite Brynne Edelsten and her partner Arsen Kishishian became the fifth couple eliminated.

| Couple | Scores | Dance | Music | Result |
|---|---|---|---|---|
| Damien & Melanie | 22 (6, 8, 8) | Tango | "TNT" — AC/DC | Safe |
| Haley & Aric | 27 (9, 9, 9) | Tango | "So What" — Pink | Safe |
| Nick & Jessica | 21 (7, 7, 7) | Paso doble | "Best of You" — Foo Fighters | Safe |
| Manu & Alana | 21 (6, 7, 8) | Cha-cha-cha | "Rollover DJ" — Jet | Safe |
| Brynne & Arsen | 13 (4, 4, 5) | Paso doble | "You Give Love a Bad Name" — Bon Jovi | Eliminated |
| Lara & Carmelo | 24 (9, 7, 8) | Cha-cha-cha | "Raise Your Glass" — Pink | Bottom two |
| Samantha & Brendon | 21 (7, 7, 7) | Tango | "Missionary Man" — The Eurythmics | Safe |
| Lara & Carmelo | 4 | Rock and Roll; Marathon | "Rock This Town" - Stray Cats & "Jump, Jive an' Wail" – Louis Prima | |
| Brynne & Arsen | 5 | Rock and Roll; Marathon | "Rock This Town" - Stray Cats & "Jump, Jive an' Wail" – Louis Prima | |
| Nick & Jessica | 6 | Rock and Roll; Marathon | "Rock This Town" - Stray Cats & "Jump, Jive an' Wail" – Louis Prima | |
| Samantha & Brendon | 7 | Rock and Roll; Marathon | "Rock This Town" - Stray Cats & "Jump, Jive an' Wail" – Louis Prima | |
| Damien & Melanie | 8 | Rock and Roll; Marathon | "Rock This Town" - Stray Cats & "Jump, Jive an' Wail" – Louis Prima | |
| Haley & Aric | 9 | Rock and Roll; Marathon | "Rock This Town" - Stray Cats & "Jump, Jive an' Wail" – Louis Prima | |
| Manu & Alana | 10 | Rock and Roll; Marathon | "Rock This Town" - Stray Cats & "Jump, Jive an' Wail" – Louis Prima | |

=== Week 7 ===
Week 7: The men versed the women tonight in the second round of competition. Nick Bracks scored the lowest in the first round, receiving a 12/30 for his quickstep, after forgetting most of his routine. Damien Leith received the first perfect score of the season, a 30/30 for his Argentine tango. In the second round, the male cha-cha-cha beat the women, 27/30 to 24/30. Hip-Hop artist Wynter Gordon performed her new song, Til Death, accompanied by her dance troupe. Haley Bracken and Aric Yegudkin found themselves in the bottom two for the first time, along with Nick Bracks and Jessica Raffa. Male model and son of political icon Steve Bracks, Nick Bracks and his partner Jessica Raffa became the sixth couple eliminated.

| Couple | Scores | Dance | Music | Result |
|---|---|---|---|---|
| Nick & Jessica | 12 (2, 5, 5) | Quickstep | "Stay the Night" – James Blunt | Eliminated |
| Haley & Aric | 24 (8, 8, 8) | Viennese waltz | "Everybody Hurts" – R.E.M. | Bottom two |
| Damien & Melanie | 30 (10, 10, 10) | Argentine tango | "Assassin's Tango" – from Mr. & Mrs. Smith | Safe |
| Samantha & Brendon | 19 (6, 7, 6) | Foxtrot | "Empire State of Mind" – Alicia Keys | Safe |
| Manu & Alana | 20 (6, 7, 7) | Rumba | "She" – Charles Aznavour | Safe |
| Lara & Carmelo | 24 (7, 8, 9) | Paso doble | "Americano" – Lady Gaga | Safe |
| Damien & Melanie Manu & Alana Nick & Jessica | 27 (9, 9, 9) | Team; Cha-cha-cha | "On the Floor" – Jennifer Lopez | |
| Haley & Aric Lara & Carmelo Samantha & Brendon | 24 (8, 8, 8) | Team; Cha-cha-cha | "Born This Way" – Lady Gaga | |

=== Week 8 ===
Week 8: Each couple had to perform an unlearned ballroom and Latin dance. For the Latin dances, each couple was only given their music 30 minutes prior to dancing. Haley and Aric received the second perfect score of the season, gaining a 30/30 for their quickstep, putting them in first place in round one. Samantha and Lara both shared the bottom spot with 19/30 apiece. Lara received scrutiny from the judges following an interview video taken from the previous week, which showed Lara criticizing judge Todd McKenney's comments for her Paso Doble and team dance. After the instant Latin dances, Haley once again received the highest score, with a 28/30, and Samantha received the lowest, an 18/30. Manu and Alana were in the bottom two for the first time, shared with Lara and Carmello, who had been in the bottom two a total of three times. Australian fashion model and media personality Lara Bingle and her partner Carmello Pizzino were the seventh couple eliminated.

| Couple | Scores | Dance | Music | Result |
|---|---|---|---|---|
| Haley & Aric | 30 (10, 10, 10) | Quickstep | "Pencil Full Of Lead" — Paolo Nutini | Safe |
| Haley & Aric | 28 (10, 9, 9) | Samba | "I'm Into You" — Jennifer Lopez | Safe |
| Damien & Melanie | 21 (7, 7, 7) | Viennese waltz | "Can't Stop Loving You" — Phil Collins | Safe |
| Damien & Melanie | 24 (6, 8, 10) | Paso doble | "Closer to the Edge" — Thirty Seconds to Mars | Safe |
| Samantha & Brendon | 19 (6, 7, 6) | Argentine tango | "Cité Tango" — Astor Piazolla | Safe |
| Samantha & Brendon | 18 (6, 6, 6) | Cha-cha-cha | "Last Friday Night (T.G.I.F.)" — Katy Perry | Safe |
| Lara & Carmelo | 19 (6, 6, 7) | Waltz | "Kissing You" — Des'ree | Eliminated |
| Lara & Carmelo | 20 (6, 6, 8) | Samba | "Kiss Kiss" — Holly Valance | Eliminated |
| Manu & Alana | 27 (9, 9, 9) | Waltz | "Love Theme from Romeo and Juliet" — André Rieu | Bottom two |
| Manu & Alana | 26 (9, 8, 9) | Paso doble | "Bring Me to Life" — Evanescence | Bottom two |

=== Week 9 ===
Week 9: Each couple performed their final unlearned ballroom and Latin dances. At the end of round one, Haley and Aric were in first place, scoring another perfect 30/30 for their Waltz. Samantha and Brendon were at the bottom with a 17/30 for their Waltz. Haley and Aric also topped the leaderboard in round two, scoring a 28/30 for their Paso doble, while Samantha and Brendon also scored the lowest, with an 18/30 for their Paso Doble. The final four couples then had to compete in a Winner Takes All Cha-Cha-Cha, the winner of which would receive an additional 15 points to their score. Manu and Alana won the Cha-Cha-Cha contest, and ended up with a total of 64/75, topping the leaderboard. Seven Newsreader and frequent low scorer of the series, Samantha Armytage and her partner Brendon Midson finished the competition in fourth place.

Couples are listed in the order they performed.

| Couple | Scores | Dance | Music | Result |
|---|---|---|---|---|
| Manu & Alana | 24 (9, 8, 7) | Samba | "Cuban Pete" — Jim Carrey | Safe |
| Manu & Alana | 25 (8, 8, 9) | Tango | "Somebody Told Me" — The Killers | Safe |
| Haley & Aric | 30 (10, 10, 10) | Waltz | "Run to You" — Whitney Houston | Safe |
| Haley & Aric | 28 (9, 9, 10) | Paso doble | "Burn My Shadow" — Unkle | Safe |
| Damiеn & Melanie | 21 (7, 7, 7) | Rumba | "For The First Time" — The Script | Safe |
| Damiеn & Melanie | 27 (9, 9, 9) | Waltz | "If I Were a Painting" — Kenny Rogers | Safe |
| Samantha & Brendon | 17 (5, 6, 6) | Waltz | "My Love" – Sia | Eliminated |
| Samantha & Brendon | 18 (5, 6, 7) | Paso doble | "The Shady Dame From Seville" – Henry Mancini | Eliminated |

Dance-offs
| Couple | Dance | Music | Result |
|---|---|---|---|
| Manu & Alana | Cha-cha-cha | "Boogie Shoes" – KC and the Sunshine Band, "Happiness" – Alexis Jordan, "When Love Takes Over" – David Guetta, feat. Kelly Rowland & "Dynamite" – Taio Cruz | Winners |
| Samantha & Brеndоn | Cha-cha-cha | "Boogie Shoes" – KC and the Sunshine Band, "Happiness" – Alexis Jordan, "When Love Takes Over" – David Guetta, feat. Kelly Rowland & "Dynamite" – Taio Cruz | Losers |
| Damien & Melanie | Cha-cha-cha | "Boogie Shoes" – KC and the Sunshine Band, "Happiness" – Alexis Jordan, "When Love Takes Over" – David Guetta, feat. Kelly Rowland & "Dynamite" – Taio Cruz | Losers |
| Haley & Aric | Cha-cha-cha | "Boogie Shoes" – KC and the Sunshine Band, "Happiness" – Alexis Jordan, "When Love Takes Over" – David Guetta, feat. Kelly Rowland & "Dynamite" – Taio Cruz | Winners |
| Haley & Aric | Cha-cha-cha | "I Like It" – Enrique Iglesias | Losers |
| Manu & Alana | Cha-cha-cha | "I Like It" – Enrique Iglesias | Winners |

=== Week 10 ===
Week 10: Each couple performed a dance deemed their "Redemption Dance" by the judges. Manu Feildel received the highest first round score, with a 28/30 for his foxtrot. Damien Leith scored the lowest, with a 23/30 for his samba. Darren Hayes performed a song from his former band Savage Garden, Truly, Madly, Deeply. All of the eliminated couples returned to dance again, with the exception of Nathan Bracken, who, while returning, could not dance, as he was incurring a neck injury. Haley Bracken received her third perfect score in the Cha-Cha-Cha face off, having an overall total of 57/60 for the night. Singer/Australian Idol Winner Damien Leith and his partner Melanie Hooper finished the competition in third place. Darren Hayes performed his new single, "Talk, Talk, Talk". Then Hayley & Aric and Manu & Alan were left to battle it out Manu scored the highest with 30/30 as he finished up his final total for all three dances was 85/90 Hayley's freestyle disappointed the judges saying the didn't get the story giving her 25/30 as she finished up with 82/90. Manu and Alana were announced the winners of dancing with the stars 2011 placing Hayley and Aric the runners-up of the series as their freestyle let them down.

Each couple performed their favourite dance of the season and a group cha-cha-cha, after which the couple with the lowest combined score was eliminated, and then the remaining two couples performed their freestyle routines. Couples are listed in the order they performed.

| Couple | Order | Scores | Dance | Music | Result |
|---|---|---|---|---|---|
| Damien & Melanie | 1 | 23 (7, 8, 8) | Samba | "Hot Hot Hot" — Buster Poindexter | Third place |
| Haley & Aric | 2 | 27 (10, 8, 9) | Argentine tango | "El Tango de Roxanne" — from Moulin Rouge! | Runners-up |
| Haley & Aric | 5 | 25 (8, 9, 8) | Freestyle | "Scream" — Michael Jackson & Janet Jackson | Runners-up |
| Manu & Alana | 3 | 28 (9, 9, 10) | Foxtrot | "Ain't That a Kick in the Head?" – Dean Martin | Winners |
| Manu & Alana | 6 | 30 (10, 10, 10) | Freestyle | "Last Dance" — Donna Summer | Winners |
| Damien & Melanie | 4 | 27 (9, 9, 9) | Group; Cha-cha-cha | "The Edge of Glory" — Lady Gaga | |
| Haley & Aric | 4 | 30 (10, 10, 10) | Group; Cha-cha-cha | "The Edge of Glory" — Lady Gaga | |
| Manu & Alana | 4 | 27 (9, 9, 9) | Group; Cha-cha-cha | "The Edge of Glory" — Lady Gaga | |

== Dance chart ==
- Week 1: Cha-cha-cha or Viennese waltz
- Week 2: Foxtrot or jive
- Week 3: Argentine Tango, samba, or waltz
- Week 4: Quickstep or rumba
- Week 5: One unlearned dance
- Week 6: One unlearned dance & Rock and Roll marathon
- Week 7: One unlearned dance & team cha-cha-cha
- Week 8: One unlearned ballroom dance & instant Latin dance
- Week 9: Two unlearned dances & cha-cha-cha dance-offs
- Week 10: Judge's pick redemption dance, group cha-cha-cha & freestyle

Dancing with the Stars (season 11) - Dance chart
| Couple | Week | | | | | | | | | | | | | | | | |
| Couple | 1 | 2 | 3 | 4 | 5 | 6 | | 7 | | 8 | | 9 | | | 10 | | |
|---|---|---|---|---|---|---|---|---|---|---|---|---|---|---|---|---|---|
| Manu & Alana | Viennese waltz | Jive | Argentine tango | Quickstep | Foxtrot | Cha-cha-cha | Rock and Roll; Marathon | Rumba | Team; Cha-cha-cha | Waltz | Paso doble | Samba | Tango | Cha-cha-cha | Foxtrot | Group; Cha-cha-cha | Freestyle |
| Haley & Aric | Cha-cha-cha | Foxtrot | Argentine tango | Rumba | Jive | Tango | Rock and Roll; Marathon | Viennese waltz | Team Cha-cha-cha | Quickstep | Samba | Waltz | Paso doble | Cha-cha-cha | Argentine tango | Group; Cha-cha-cha | Freestyle |
| Damien & Melanie | Cha-cha-cha | Foxtrot | Samba | Quickstep | Jive | Tango | Rock and Roll; Marathon | Argentine tango | Team Cha-cha-cha | Viennese waltz | Paso doble | Rumba | Waltz | Cha-cha-cha | Samba | Group; Cha-cha-cha | |
| Samantha & Brendon | Viennese waltz | Jive | Samba | Rumba | Quickstep | Tango | Rock and Roll; Marathon | Foxtrot | Team Cha-cha-cha | Argentine tango | Cha-cha-cha | Waltz | Paso doble | Cha-cha-cha | | | |
| Lara & Carmelo | Viennese waltz | Jive | Argentine tango | Quickstep | Foxtrot | Cha-cha-cha | Rock and Roll; Marathon | Paso doble | Team Cha-cha-cha | Waltz | Samba | | | | | | |
| Nick & Jessica | Cha-cha-cha | Foxtrot | Waltz | Rumba | Tango | Paso doble | Rock and Roll; Marathon | Quickstep | Team Cha-cha-cha | | | | | | | | |
| Brynne & Arsen | Cha-cha-cha | Foxtrot | Waltz | Quickstep | Samba | Paso doble | Rock and Roll; Marathon | | | | | | | | | | |
| Daniel & Luda | Cha-cha-cha | Foxtrot | Samba | Rumba | Quickstep | | | | | | | | | | | | |
| Mark & Jade | Cha-cha-cha | Foxtrot | Waltz | Quickstep | | | | | | | | | | | | | |
| Jan & Mark | Viennese waltz | Jive | Samba | | | | | | | | | | | | | | |
| Nathan & Masha | Viennese waltz | Jive | | | | | | | | | | | | | | | |

== Guest performances ==
| Date | Artist(s) | Song(s) |
|---|---|---|
| 8 May 2011 | Ronan Keating | "Walk On By" |
| 22 May 2011 | James Blunt | "If Time Is All I Have" |
| 22 May 2011 | Jennifer Hudson | "And I Am Telling You I'm Not Going" |
| 22 May 2011 | Jennifer Hudson | "I Remember Me" |
| 29 May 2011 | Jessica Mauboy & Stan Walker | "What Happened to Us" |
| 5 June 2011 | Brian McFadden | "That's How Life Goes" |
| 12 June 2011 | Carrie Underwood | "Undo It" |
| 19 June 2011 | Wynter Gordon | "Til Death" |
| 10 July 2011 | Darren Hayes | "Truly Madly Deeply" |
| 10 July 2011 | Darren Hayes | "Talk, Talk, Talk" |

== Ratings ==
| Episode | Original airdate | Viewers (in millions) | Rank | Source |
|---|---|---|---|---|
| Week one | 8 May 2011 | 1.505 | #2 | |
| Week two | 15 May 2011 | 1.613 | #2 | |
| Week three | 22 May 2011 | 1.449 | #4 | |
| Week four | 29 May 2011 | 1.429 | #5 | |
| Week five | 5 June 2011 | 1.541 | #2 | |
| Week six | 12 June 2011 | 1.347 | #5 | |
| Week seven | 19 June 2011 | 1.551 | #4 | |
| Week eight | 26 June 2011 | 1.515 | #5 | |
| Week nine | 3 July 2011 | 1.477 | #5 | |
| Week ten | 10 July 2011 | 1.470 | #3 | |

| Preceded by Dancing with the Stars (Australian season 10) | Dancing with the Stars (Australian version); Season 11 | Succeeded by Dancing with the Stars (Australian season 12) |
