= Be Yourself =

Be Yourself is a Delphic maxim, Σαυτὸν ἴσθι, and may refer to:

== Music ==
- "Be Yourself" (Hawkwind song), 1970
- "Be Yourself", a Graham Nash song from Songs for Beginners, 1971
- "Be Yourself" (Morcheeba song), 2000
- "Be Yourself" (Enrique Iglesias song), 2003
- "Be Yourself" (Audioslave song), 2005
- Be Yourself (Melinda Schneider album), 2008
- Be Yourself (Michael Rose album), 1996
- Be Yourself (Patti LaBelle album), 1989
- Be Yourself (Carlos Toshiki & Omega Tribe album), 1989
- Be Yourself (EP), a 2022 EP by Jay B

== Film ==
- Be Yourself!, a 1930 film starring Fanny Brice
