= Melinda Does Doris =

Studio album by Melinda Schneider
- Released: 30 July 2010
- Length: 35:47
- Label: Universal Music Australia

Melinda Schneider chronology
Be Yourself (2008)	Melinda Does Doris (2010)	Life Begins At 40: The Ultimate Melinda Schneider Collection (2011)

Melinda Does Doris is the sixth studio album by the Australian country music singer Melinda Schneider. The album was released on 30 July 2010, peaked at number 24 on the ARIA Charts and was certified gold in 2022.

The album was recorded following encouragement from David Campbell and its release coincided with Schneider's appearance on the tenth season of the Australian version of Dancing with the Stars.

The album's release preceded the theatre show Doris: So Much More Than the Girl Next Door, co-written by Melinda and David Mitchell and performed by Schneider.

== Track listing ==
1. "Everybody Loves a Lover" - 2:43
2. "Perhaps, Perhaps, Perhaps" - 2:22
3. "Que Será, Será (Whatever Will Be, Will Be)" - 2:05
4. "It's Magic" - 3:31
5. "Put 'Em in a Box" 3:03
6. "The Black Hills of Dakota" - 3:02
7. "Secret Love" - 3:49
8. "Love Somebody" (with David Campbell) - 3:10
9. "The Deadwood Stage" - 3:17
10. "Sentimental Journey" - 3:00
11. "Teacher's Pet" - 2:31
12. "I'll See You in My Dreams" - 3:10

== Charts ==
Weekly chart performance for Melinda Does Doris
Chart (2010)	Peak position
Australian Albums (ARIA)	24
Australian Jazz Albums (ARIA)	1

Year-end chart performance for Melinda Does Doris
Chart (2010)	Position
Australian Artist Albums (ARIA)	50
Australian Jazz Albums (ARIA)	4
Chart (2011)	Position
Australian Jazz Albums (ARIA)	12
Chart (2012)	Position
Australian Jazz Albums (ARIA)	45

== Certification ==
Certifications for Melinda Does Doris
Region	Certification	Certified units/sales
Australia (ARIA)	Gold	35,000^{‡}
^{^} Shipments figures based on certification alone.
