= Brynne: My Bedazzled Life =

- Genre: Reality television
- Starring: Brynne Edelsten; Geoffrey Edelsten
- Country of origin: Australia
- No. of seasons: 2
- No. of episodes: 9

Original release
- Network: Seven Network
- Release: 4 October 2012 – 18 August 2014

Brynne: My Bedazzled Life is an Australian TV show, which follows the life of Brynne Edelsten, the wife of multi-millionaire Geoffrey Edelsten. The show was filmed primarily in Melbourne. In May 2013, there were rumours that the show would come back for another season. The series returned for a second season on 4 August 2014 titled Brynne: My Bedazzled Diary.
