= Haley Bracken =

Australian model and television personality

- Occupations: Model, Television Personality
- Spouse: Nathan Bracken
- Children: 2

Haley Bracken is an Australian model and television personality. She is married to former cricketer Nathan Bracken. She and her husband competed against each other on Australia's Dancing with the Stars, where Haley and partner Aric Yegudkin finished second.

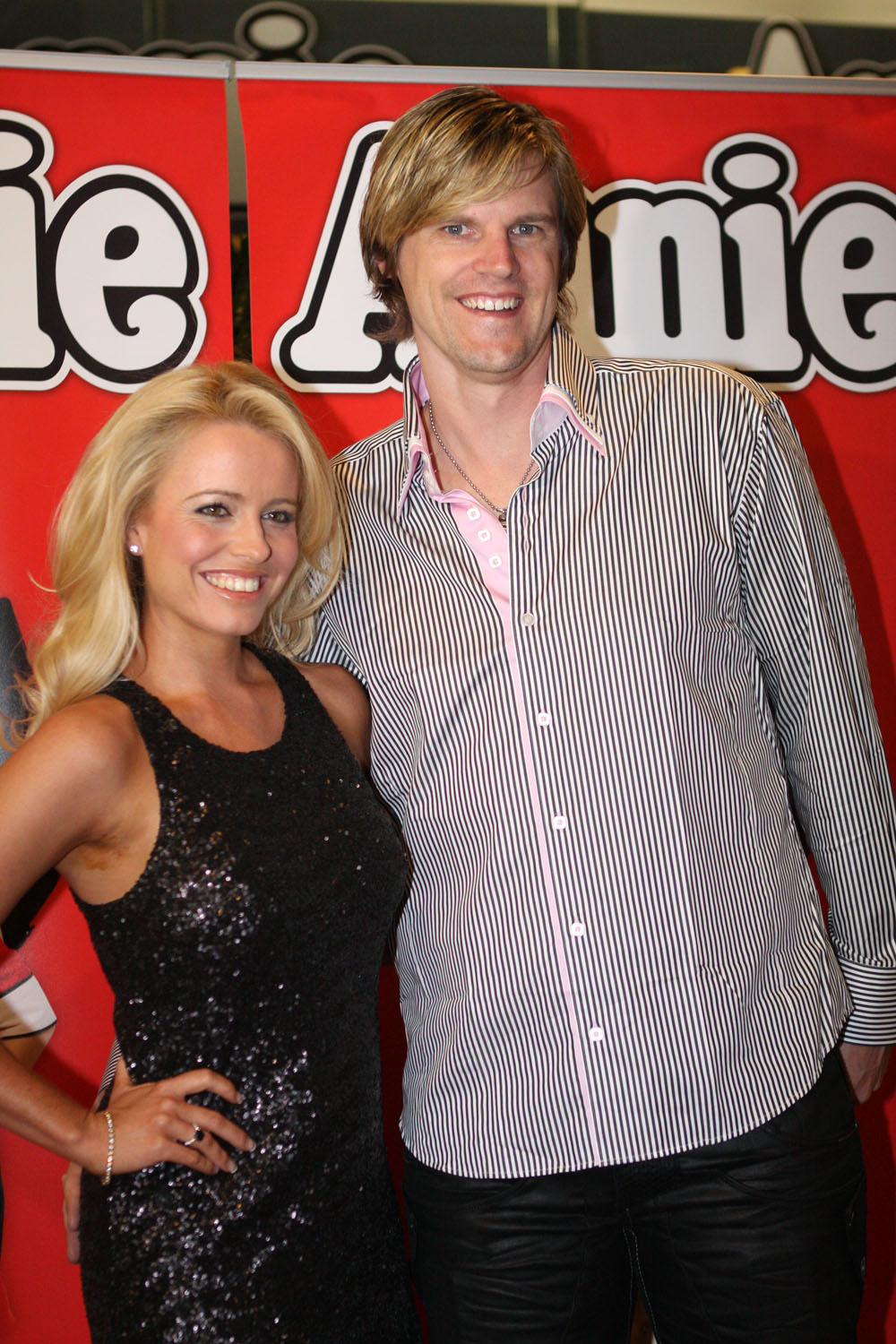
Nathan and Haley Bracken (2012)

== Early life and education ==
Haley Bracken began dancing at age 3 and singing at age 11. Bracken has a degree in Primary School teaching and completed some work towards a law degree. By 2004 she married cricketer Nathan Bracken.

== Career ==
Bracken gained notoriety for her red carpet look at the 2010 Allan Border Medal awards. The appearance led to Bracken modeling on the cover of Australian lads magazines.

In 2011, Nathan and Haley Bracken joined the cast of Dancing with the Stars, competing against each other. Haley Bracken was paired with Aric Yegudkin. Nathan Bracken was the first celebrity eliminated. Haley Bracken fared better than her husband; she and Yegudkin finished in second place behind chef Manu Feildel and his partner Alana Patience. That same year, Bracken was selected to represent Australia in a Mrs. International pageant.

By 2017, Bracken had become a professional hypnotist.

== Personal life ==
Bracken has two children. In 2017 the Bracken family moved to Jilliby. Bracken has had multiple cysts removed from her ovaries, prompting her to choose Ovarian Cancer Australia as her charity during her stint on Dancing with the Stars.
