= Family Tree (Melinda Schneider album) =

Studio album by Melinda Schneider
- Released: May 2004
- Length: 39:16
- Label: Compass Brothers, Sony
- Producer: Graham Thompson

Melinda Schneider chronology
| Happy Tears (2002) | Family Tree (2004) | Stronger (2006) |

Family Tree is the third studio album by the Australian country music singer Melinda Schneider. The album was released in May 2004 and peaked at number 64 on the ARIA Charts and was certified gold in 2006.

At the 2004 ARIA Music Awards, the album was nominated for Best Country Album. At the 2005 Country Music Awards of Australia, the album won Album of the Year. "Real People" also won Song of the Year.

== Track listing ==
1. "Family Tree" – 2:47
2. "Sgt. Bean" – 3:50
3. "Beautiful Thing" – 2:38
4. "Walk That Wire" – 3:42
5. "Dream Him Home" – 3:37
6. "The Healing Power" – 3:07
7. "I Wanna Be Married" – 2:41
8. "Real People" – 3:48
9. "Goodbye House" – 4:33
10. "The L Word" – 2:59
11. "That's What I Was Thinking" – 3:22
12. "Spaghetti Is Ready" – 2:03

== Charts ==
Chart performance for Family Tree
| Chart (2004) | Peak position |
|---|---|
| Australian Albums (ARIA) | 64 |

== Certification ==
Certifications for Family Tree
| Region | Certification | Certified units/sales |
|---|---|---|
| Australia (ARIA) | Gold | 35,000^{^} |
^{^} Shipments figures based on certification alone.
