= Tighten Up Your Pants =

1994 single by Audio Murphy Inc.

Single by Audio Murphy Inc. featuring Melinda
- Released: November 1994
- Length: 3:48
- Label: Festival Records
- Songwriters: Melinda Schneider, Heggen, Moffat, Monroe
- Producers: Richard Faybus, Tif

"Tighten Up Your Pants" is a song released by Australian country-techno act Audio Murphy Inc. featuring vocals by Melinda in November 1994. The song mixed electronic beats and yodelling peaked at number 39 on the ARIA Charts and number 3 on the Australian dance charts.

"Tighten Up Your Pants" was inspired by the chart success of "Cotton-Eye Joe" by Swedish group Rednex.

== Track listings ==
Australian CD single/Cassingle (D 11877)

1. "Tighten Up Your Pants" (Scotland Medley) (7" Version) - 3:48
2. "Tighten Up Your Pants" (Scotland Medley) (12" Version) - 7:04
3. "Tighten Up Your Pants" (Scotland Medley) (7" Original Version) - 3:25

European Maxi single

1. "Tighten Up Your Pants" (Little And Large 7" Mix) - 3:26
2. "Tighten Up Your Pants" (7" Remix) - 3:38
3. "Tighten Up Your Pants" (Little And Large 12" Mix) - 5:53
4. "Tighten Up Your Pants" (12" Mix Original) - 6:56
5. "Tighten Up Your Pants" (Little And Large Instrumental Mix) - 4:33
6. "Tighten Up Your Pants" (7" Original Mix) - 3:23

== Charts ==
Chart (1994)	Peak position
Australia (ARIA)	39
