= Mary Schneider =

Australian singer (born 1932)

Mary Schneider AM
- Born: 25 October 1932 (age 94); Rockhampton, Queensland, Australia
- Genres: Country, yodelling
- Occupations: Singer; songwriter
- Years active: 1945–present
- Formerly of: The Schneider Sisters

Mary Schneider AM (born 25 October 1932) is an Australian singer and performer. Known as "Australia's Queen of Yodelling", she is a master at the classic Swiss Alpine style and is best known for yodelling the works of various standards by many classic composers. Her yodelling repertoire has covered everything from classical music pieces to marches and European folk music tunes and big band.

As a performer, she started her career establishing the duo the Schneider Sisters with her sister Rita. Although mostly known for the country music genre, the sisters wrote and performed Australia's first original rock 'n' roll single.

Aside from recording and touring, Schneider is well-known for her many television appearances both locally and internationally. She is the mother of Melinda Schneider, a country music singer-songwriter, musician and actress.

== Biography ==
=== Early life ===
Mary Schneider was born to George Frank Schneider and his wife Amelia. One of five, she is of Bavarian descent. Her family where all musical, with her brother Alan being a jazz guitarist, whilst her sister Rita, whom she performed alongside early in her career, was a singer, writer, record producer and song compiler and publisher, who also worked briefly as a dramatic actress and was a noted presence on radio and television, most especially appearing alongside Mary. Rita also worked as a talent and copyright supervisor for 17 years with the Seven Network.

== The Schneider Sisters ==
=== Australia's first rock record ===
She started her performing career in 1945 when, with her sister Rita Schneider (1928–2009), they formed the duo the Schneider Sisters, who in 2002 were inducted into the Australian Roll of Renown. The sisters also received honours with the ACE Awards Lifetime Achievement Award.

Although a little-known fact, the Schneider Sisters were actually the first Australian act to write and perform Australia's first original rock 'n' roll song, although this distinction is normally attributed to Johnny O'Keefe with his 1958 hit "Wild One". The song, titled "Washboard Rock 'n Roll", was written and recorded by the duo in the 1950s. They wrote the song because they needed a fourth track for their Rockin' With The Schneiders EP.

The sisters attended Our Lady of Victories School in Bowen Hills. During the final year of the Second World War they entertained troops in Brisbane at a concert party, after which Schneider auditioned for Dick Fairs Australian Amateur Hour radio show. She was initially passed over, but was accepted after returning with her sister Rita as a singing duo.

They made their first professional appearance on radio on 4BH on the program Smokes for Sick Soldiers. They were signed to EMI's Regal Zonophone label in 1950 and toured with Mack's Revue Company. In 1957 they toured and entertained troops stationed in Korea and Japan. In 1970 they toured South East Asia for American troops.

The sisters were staples on radio and TV shows, appearing on early ABC series Seeing Stars and also local TV in Brisbane on variety shows, singing harmony for stars such as the Bee Gees.

== Media appearances ==
She has appeared on numerous radio and TV programs locally and internationally including the Don and Mike Show, The Howard Stern Show and National Public Radio in the US, Spicks and Specks and Enough Rope on ABC TV and Eurotrash in the UK.

== Honours ==
Schneider was recognised in the Queen's Birthday Honours in 2012, with the Order of Australia (AM)

== Discography ==
=== Albums ===
List of albums, with Australian chart positions
Title	Album details	Peak chart positions
Title	Album details	AUS
The Magic of Yodelling	Released: 1981; Format: LP, Cassette; Label: K-Tel (NA 614)	33
Can't Stop Yodelling	Released: 1983; Format: LP, Cassette; Label: K-Tel (NA 656)	70
Australia's Queen of Yodelling	Released: 1986; Format: LP, Cassette; Label: Colstal Music (MARY 101/2)	–
Yodelling the Classics	Released: 1997; Format: CD; Label: Koch Crossover Music (3-6650-2)	–
Yodelling the Classics II	Released: 2001; Format: CD; Label: Musigal Music (RMGRO434)	–
Ultimate Collection	Released: 2002; Format: CD; Label: Rajon Music Group (R0067); Compilation album	–
The Great Mary Schneider – Australia's Queen of Yodelling	Released: 2005; Format: 3x CD; Label: Rajon (CDR0425); Compilation album	–

== Awards and honours ==
=== Australian Roll of Renown ===
The Australian Roll of Renown honours Australian and New Zealand musicians who have shaped the music industry by making a significant and lasting contribution to country music. It was inaugurated in 1976 and the inductees are announced at the Country Music Awards of Australia in Tamworth in January.

Year	Nominee / work	Award	Result
2002	The Schneider Sisters (Mary and Rita Schneider)	Australian Roll of Renown	inductee

=== Mo Awards ===
The Australian Entertainment Mo Awards (commonly known informally as the Mo Awards), were annual Australian entertainment industry awards. They recognise achievements in live entertainment in Australia from 1975 to 2016. Mary Schneider won five awards in that time.

Year	Nominee / work	Award	Result (wins only)
1983	Mary Schneider	Vocal / Instrumental Act of the Year	Won
1984	Mary Schneider	Vocal / Instrumental Act of the Year	Won
1985	Mary Schneider	Vocal / Instrumental Act of the Year	Won
1986	Mary Schneider	Vocal / Instrumental Act of the Year	Won
1987	Mary Schneider	Vocal / Instrumental Act of the Year	Won

=== Tamworth Songwriters Association awards ===
The Tamworth Songwriters Association (TSA) awards are an annual songwriting contest for original country songs, awarded in January at the Tamworth Country Music Festival. They commenced in 1986. Schneider has won two awards.

Year	Nominee / work	Award	Result (wins only)
1999	"The Video Song" by Rita and Mary Schneider and Jim Haynes	Comedy/ Novelty Song of the Year	Won
2009	The Schnieder Sisters	Songmaker Award	awarded
