= Brynne Edelsten =

American TV personality (born 1983)

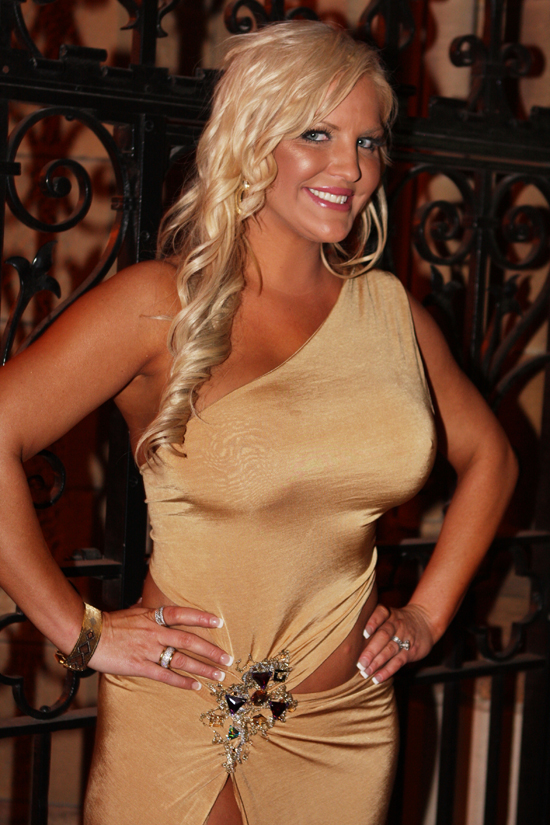
- Edelsten in 2012
- Born: Brynne Mariah Gordon; 29 January 1983 (age 43); Shawnee, Oklahoma, U.S.
- Occupation: Television personality
- Television: Dancing with the Stars, Brynne: My Bedazzled Life
- Spouse: Geoffrey Edelsten (2009–2014)

Brynne Mariah Edelsten (née Gordon; born 29 January 1983) is an American reality television personality based in Australia.

== Career ==
Edelsten was working as a fitness instructor in California before meeting her future husband Geoffrey Edelsten.

Edelsten appeared in Series 11 of Dancing with the Stars; she was eliminated 5th on 12 June 2011. In mid-2012, Channel 7 confirmed that Edelsten would be getting her own reality TV show called Brynne: My Bedazzled Life. The first series premiered on 4 October 2012.

In 2013, she was featured in Celebrity Splash!, a show that follows celebrities as they try to master the art of diving. Edelsten's reality TV show returned for a second series on 4 August 2014 with the new title of Brynne: My Bedazzled Diary.

In 2021 she appeared on the second season of SAS Australia: Who Dares Wins.

== Personal life ==
Brynne met Geoffrey Edelsten, a controversial Australian businessman 41 years her senior, in Las Vegas on a blind date. They married on 29 November 2009 in Melbourne, Victoria at Crown Casino. The wedding was alleged to have cost approximately $3 million and featured a helicopter, circus performers and performances by Tom Burlinson and other headline acts. Actor Jason Alexander gave an address at the wedding, though Alexander did not personally know the couple.

In January 2014, it was announced that the Edelstens' marriage was over. Brynne said she was unable to forgive "her publicity-obsessed husband for a reported dalliance with another woman more than 18 months ago" as the reason for the break up.

In May 2021, Edelsten was arrested and charged with trafficking drugs and suspected proceeds of crime; she later avoided conviction for the offenses. In December 2025, Edelsten was again charged with drug trafficking after a police raid allegedly found commercial quantities of several types of narcotics in her home.

As of December 2025, Edelsten has one child.

== Filmography ==
=== Television series ===
Year	Title	Role	Notes
2011	Dancing With the Stars	Herself	Eliminated 5th
2012–2014	Brynne: My Bedazzled Life / Brynne: My Bedazzled Diary	Herself	11 episodes
2013	Celebrity Splash!	Herself	Eliminated 8th
2021	SAS Australia: Who Dares Wins	Herself	Voluntarily withdrew episode 1
