= Dancing with the Stars (Australian TV series) season 10 =

Dancing with the Stars
- Season 10
- Hosted by: Daniel MacPherson; Sonia Kruger
- Judges: Todd McKenney; Helen Richey; Mark Wilson
- Celebrity winner: Rob Palmer
- Professional winner: Alana Patience
- No. of episodes: 10

Release
- Original network: Seven Network
- Original release: 27 June – 29 August 2010

Season chronology
- ← Previous; Season 9 Next → Season 11

The tenth season of the Australian Dancing with the Stars debuted on 27 June 2010. Daniel MacPherson and Sonia Kruger returned as hosts, while Todd McKenney, Helen Richey, and Mark Wilson returned as judges. This was Wilson's last season as judge.

Television presenter Rob Palmer and Alana Patience were announced as the winners on 29 August 2010, while singer Tamara Jaber and Carmelo Pizzino finished in second place, and photographer Alex Fevola and Arsen Kishishian finished in third.

== Couples ==
This season featured eleven celebrity contestants. Jason Stevens was originally paired with Linda De Nicola, but she was injured during their week of rehearsals and was replaced at the last minute by Eliza Campagna.

Celebrity	Notability	Professional partner	Status
Jason Stevens	NRL player	Eliza Campagna	Eliminated 1st on 4 July 2010
Blair McDonough	Neighbours actor	Jessica Raffa	Eliminated 2nd on 11 July 2010
Jo Beth Taylor	Television presenter	Dannial Gosper	Eliminated 3rd on 18 July 2010
Melinda Schneider	Country singer	Sergei Bolgarschii	Eliminated 4th on 25 July 2010
Rachael Finch	Miss Universe Australia 2009	Michael Miziner	Eliminated 5th on 1 August 2010
Esther Anderson	Home and Away actress	Brendon Midson	Eliminated 6th on 8 August 2010
David Wirrpanda	AFL player	Liza Van Pelt	Withdrew on 15 August 2010
George Houvardas	Actor	Luda Kroitor	Eliminated 7th on 22 August 2010
Alex Fevola	Photographer	Arsen Kishishian	Third place on 29 August 2010
Tamara Jaber	Singer	Carmelo Pizzino	Runners-up on 29 August 2010
Rob Palmer	Television presenter	Alana Patience	Winners on 29 August 2010

== Scoring chart ==
The highest score each week is indicated in bold green with a dagger (†), while the lowest score each week is indicated in italicized red with a double-dagger (‡).

Color key:

Winners
Runners-up
Third place
Bottom two
Eliminated

Dancing with the Stars (season 10) - Weekly scores
Couple	Pl.	Week										
Couple	Pl.	1	2	1+2	3	4	5	6	7	8	9	10
Rob & Alana	1st	18	23	41	21	24	20	25	24+26=**50**†	25+27=52 (Note: This couple was in the bottom two, but was not eliminated.)	28+28=56	24+23+30=77 (Note: This couple finished in first place.)
Tamara & Carmelo	2nd	**25**†	**28**†	**53**†	**24**†	22	**28**†	**27**†	23+27=**50**†	30+26=**56**†	27+28+10=**65**†	30+27+27=**84**† (Note: This couple finished in second place.)
Alex & Arsen	3rd	15	20	35	21	24	23	21	24+22=46	23+24=47	17+24=41‡	23+22=45‡ (Note: This couple finished in third place.)
George & Luda	4th	15	20	35	14‡	22	21	21	19+24=43	21+23=44	20+24=44 (Note: This couple was eliminated.)	
David & Liza	5th	12‡	24	36	15	18‡	16‡	15‡	11+15=26‡	19+17=36‡ (Note: This couple withdrew from the competition.)		
Esther & Brendon	6th	20	21	41	**24**†	**26**†	24	21	17+20=37			
Rachael & Michael	7th	23	17	40	23	23	27	20				
Melinda & Serghei	8th	21	20	41	18	24	20					
Jo Beth & Dannial	9th	17	20	37	21	18‡						
Blair & Jessica	10th	24	22	46	16							
Jason & Eliza	11th	16	15‡	31‡								

== Weekly scores ==
Unless indicated otherwise, individual judges scores in the chart below (given in parentheses) are listed in this order from left to right: Todd McKenney, Helen Richey, Mark Wilson.

=== Week 1 ===
Week 1: Tamara Jaber scored the highest points of the night with 25/30 for her Cha-Cha-Cha. David Wirrpanda's Viennese Waltz was the lowest with 12/30. Pamela Anderson and Damien Whitewood performed their Cha-Cha-Cha from week one of Season 10 of Dancing With The Stars in America. Dance troupe Justice Crew also performed a routine.

Couples performed either the cha-cha-cha or the Viennese waltz. Couples are listed in the order they performed.

Couple	Scores	Dance	Music
George & Luda	15 (4, 6, 5)	Cha-cha-cha	"Push It" — Salt n Pepa
Jo Beth & Dannial	17 (5, 6, 6)	Viennese waltz	"My Favourite Things" — Big Brovaz
Melinda & Serghei	21 (7, 7, 7)	Cha-cha-cha	"Can You Feel It" — Jackson 5
David & Liza	12 (4, 5, 3)	Viennese waltz	"Have You Ever Really Loved A Woman?" — Bryan Adams
Esther & Brendon	20 (6, 7, 7)	Cha-cha-cha	"Tik Tok" — Ke$ha
Jason & Eliza	16 (4, 6, 6)	Viennese waltz	"End of the Road" — Boyz II Men
Blair & Jessica	24 (8, 8, 8)	Cha-cha-cha	"Close To You" — John Butler Trio
Alex & Arsen	15 (3, 6, 6)	Viennese waltz	"Runaway" ― The Corrs
Tamara & Carmelo	25 (8, 8, 9)	Cha-cha-cha	"Not Myself Tonight" — Christina Aguilera
Rob & Alana	18 (5, 7, 6)	Viennese waltz	"Mr. Bojangles" — Sammy Davis Jr
Rachael & Michael	23 (7, 8, 8)	Cha-cha-cha	"Telephone" — Lady Gaga & Beyoncé

=== Week 2 ===
Week 2: Tamara & Carmelo once again topped the leader board, scoring two 9s and a 10 from the judges for their Tango. David Wirrpanda doubled his week one score of 12/30 to 24/30 for his Jive. Rachael and Michael had points deducted for breaking hold during their tango. George Houvardas and Jason Stevens were in the bottom two, and Jason Stevens was the first contestant eliminated.

Couples performed either the jive or the tango. Couples are listed in the order they performed.

Couple	Scores	Dance	Music	Result
Blair & Jessica	22 (7, 8, 7)	Tango	"Voodoo Child" — Rogue Traders	Safe
Rachael & Michael	17 (3, 7, 7)	Tango	"Objection (Tango)" — Shakira	Safe
Jason & Eliza	15 (5, 5, 5)	Jive	"Hey Ya!" — Outkast	Eliminated
Melinda & Serghei	20 (5, 7, 8)	Tango	"Libertango" — Grace Jones	Safe
Esther & Brendon	21 (7, 7, 7)	Tango	"Bust Your Windows" — Jazmine Sullivan	Safe
Rob & Alana	23 (7, 8, 8)	Jive	"Devil Gate Drive" — Suzi Quatro	Safe
Jo Beth & Dannial	20 (7, 7, 6)	Jive	"Shake It" — Metro Station	Safe
George & Luda	20 (7, 7, 6)	Tango	"Money, Money, Money" ― ABBA	Bottom two
Tamara & Carmelo	28 (10, 9, 9)	Tango	"Sweet Dreams" — Beyoncé	Safe
David & Liza	24 (8, 8, 8)	Jive	"How Far We've Come" — Matchbox 20	Safe
Alex & Arsen	20 (6, 7, 7)	Jive	"Do You Love Me" — The Contours	Safe

=== Week 3 ===
Week 3: Esther and Brendon tied with Tamara and Carmelo for first place, each couple receiving 24/30 for their Paso Dobles. Blair and Jessica, as well as George and Luda had points deducted as the judges felt the choreography for each routine did not match the music. The bottom two couples were Melinda & Serghei and Blair & Jessica. Blair and Jessica were unexpectedly eliminated, with their elimination being met by boos from the audience.

Couples performed either the foxtrot or the paso doble. Couples are listed in the order they performed.

Couple	Scores	Dance	Music	Result
Tamara & Carmelo	24 (8, 8, 8)	Paso doble	"España cañí" — from Shall We Dance?	Safe
Jo Beth & Dannial	21 (7, 7, 7)	Foxtrot	"Sweet About Me" — Gabriella Cilmi	Safe
George & Luda	14 (5, 5, 4)	Paso doble	"Walk This Way" — Aerosmith	Safe
Melinda & Serghei	18 (6, 6, 6)	Paso doble	"Don't Let Me Be Misunderstood" — The Animals	Bottom two
Alex & Arsen	21 (6, 7, 8)	Foxtrot	"Pictures Of You" — The Last Goodnight	Safe
David & Liza	15 (5, 5, 5)	Foxtrot	"I've Got You Under My Skin" — Frank Sinatra	Safe
Rachael & Michael	23 (7, 8, 8)	Paso doble	"Would I Lie To You?" — The Eurythmics	Safe
Blair & Jessica	16 (6, 5, 5)	Paso doble	"Are You Gonna Go My Way" — Lenny Kravitz	Eliminated
Rob & Alana	21 (7, 7, 7)	Foxtrot	"Big Spender" — Shirley Bassey	Safe
Esther & Brendon	24 (9, 7, 8)	Paso doble	"Paparazzi" — Lady Gaga	Safe

=== Week 4 ===
Week 4: Esther and Brendon took solo first place with 26/30 for their quickstep, making it the first time Tamara and Carmelo had not been the highest scoring couple. Every couple with the exception of David and Liza, Jo Beth and Dannial and Tamara and Carmelo received their highest scores in the competition. Jo Beth and Dannial and Tamara and Carmelo were both in the bottom two for the first time. Jo Beth had the lowest score for her rumba and was eliminated.

Couples performed either the quickstep or the rumba. Couples are listed in the order they performed.

Couple	Scores	Dance	Music	Result
David & Liza	18 (5, 7, 6)	Rumba	"The Most Beautiful Girl in the World" — Prince	Safe
Melinda & Serghei	24 (8, 8, 8)	Quickstep	"Too Darn Hot" — Buddy Greco	Safe
Jo Beth & Dannial	18 (6, 6, 6)	Rumba	"I Just Can't Stop Loving You" — Michael Jackson	Eliminated
Rachael & Michael	23 (7, 8, 8)	Quickstep	"Valerie" — Amy Winehouse & Mark Ronson	Safe
Rob & Alana	24 (7, 8, 9)	Rumba	"Romeo and Juliet" — Dire Straits	Safe
Alex & Arsen	24 (8, 8, 8)	Rumba	"P.S. (I'm Still Not Over You)" — Rihanna	Safe
George & Luda	22 (7, 7, 8)	Quickstep	"Jungle Drum" — Emiliana Torrini	Safe
Esther & Brendon	26 (9, 8, 9)	Quickstep	"Hey Soul Sister" — Train	Safe
Tamara & Carmelo	22 (7, 7, 8)	Quickstep	"Hey! Pachuco!" — from The Mask	Bottom two

=== Week 5 ===
Week 5: For the first time in the competition, the top four highest scoring couples were all women. Tamara and Carmelo scored the second perfect 10 of the season for their samba and regained the top spot with a near-perfect 28/30. David and Liza were again in last place with 16/30 for their waltz. Kylie Minogue performed her new single All the Lovers. George and Luda were in the bottom two with Melinda and Serghei, with Melinda Schneider being the second woman to be eliminated from the competition.

Couples performed either the samba or the waltz. Couples are listed in the order they performed.

Couple	Scores	Dance	Music	Result
Esther & Brendon	24 (8, 8, 8)	Samba	"Magalenha" — Sérgio Mendes	Safe
Melinda & Serghei	20 (6, 7, 7)	Samba	"When I Get You Alone" — Robin Thicke	Eliminated
George & Luda	21 (7, 7, 7)	Samba	"Batucada" — Rhythms of Resistance	Bottom two
Rob & Alana	20 (6, 7, 7)	Waltz	"Love Don't Live Here Anymore" — Rose Royce	Safe
Tamara & Carmelo	28 (9, 9, 10)	Samba	"Put It in a Love Song" — Alicia Keys & Beyoncé	Safe
David & Liza	16 (4, 6, 6)	Waltz	"I Wonder Why" — Curtis Stigers	Safe
Rachael & Michael	27 (9, 9, 9)	Samba	"Hey Baby" — No Doubt	Safe
Alex & Arsen	23 (6, 8, 9)	Waltz	"Sam" — Olivia Newton-John	Safe

=== Week 6 ===
Week 6: For the second week in a row, Tamara and Carmelo were in first place, scoring 27/30 for their Aussie smooth. For the third week in a row, David and Liza were in last place with 15/30 for their salsa. Indie UK band Florence & The Machine performed their song You've Got The Love. George and Luda were in the bottom two for their third time in the competition. Despite receiving their highest scores in the previous week, Rachael Finch and her partner Michael were the fifth couple eliminated.

Couples performed either the Aussie Smooth or the salsa. Couples are listed in the order they performed.

Couple	Scores	Dance	Music	Result
Rachael & Michael	20 (6, 7, 7)	Aussie Smooth	"Bad Day" — Daniel Powter	Eliminated
David & Liza	15 (5, 5, 5)	Salsa	"Viva Las Vegas" — Elvis Presley	Safe
Esther & Brendon	21 (6, 8, 7)	Aussie Smooth	"Haven't Met You Yet" — Michael Bublé	Safe
Alex & Arsen	21 (7, 7, 7)	Salsa	"Higher" — Gloria Estefan	Safe
George & Luda	21 (7, 7, 7)	Aussie Smooth	"Mystify" — INXS	Bottom two
Tamara & Carmelo	27 (9, 9, 9)	Aussie Smooth	"Chasing Cars" — Snow Patrol	Safe
Rob & Alana	25 (8, 8, 9)	Salsa	"Sumba" — DJ Remix Factory	Safe

=== Week 7 ===
Week 7: For week 7, the couples danced two unlearned dances each, which were to the theme of songs from the 1980s. Rob & Alana and Alex & Arsen shared first place after round one, with 24/30, with David & Liza in last place with 11/30 for their samba. For round two, Tamara & Carmelo were in first place, scoring 27/30 for their jive, with David & Liza once again in last place with 15/30 for their quickstep. When the scores were combined, Tamara and Rob shared the top spot with 50/60, with David in last place with 26/60. Receiving her lowest scores in the competition this week, Esther Anderson was eliminated.

Each couple performed two routines. Couples are listed in the order they performed.

Couple	Scores	Dance	Music	Result
Rob & Alana	24 (8, 8, 8)	Cha-cha-cha	"Funkytown" — Lipps Inc	Safe
Rob & Alana	26 (9, 9, 8)	Tango	"Original Sin" — INXS	Safe
Esther & Brendon	17 (6, 6, 5)	Jive	"White Wedding" — Billy Idol	Eliminated
Esther & Brendon	20 (6, 7, 7)	Viennese waltz	"Blue Eyes" — Elton John	Eliminated
David & Liza	11 (3, 4, 4)	Samba	"Come On Eileen" — Dexy's Midnight Runners	Safe
David & Liza	15 (3, 6, 6)	Quickstep	"Don't Get Me Wrong" — The Pretenders	Safe
Tamara & Carmelo	23 (7, 8, 8)	Foxtrot	"Private Dancer" — Tina Turner	Safe
Tamara & Carmelo	27 (9, 9, 9)	Jive	"Dancing In The Dark" — Bruce Springsteen	Safe
Alex & Arsen	24 (8, 8, 8)	Quickstep	"Walking On Sunshine" — Katrina & The Waves	Bottom two
Alex & Arsen	22 (8, 7, 7)	Cha-cha-cha	"Material Girl" — Madonna	Bottom two
George & Luda	19 (5, 6, 8)	Salsa	"You Spin Me Round (Like a Record)" — Dead or Alive	Safe
George & Luda	24 (8, 8, 8)	Foxtrot	"If You Leave" — Orchestral Manoeuvres in the Dark	Safe

=== Week 8 ===
Week 8: The first perfect score of the season was awarded to Tamara and Carmelo for their salsa, topping the leader board with 56/60 at the end of the night. David and Liza once again were at the bottom with 36/60 for their two dances. For the first time in 10 seasons of the Australian version of the show, David Wirrpanda voluntarily left the competition, receiving the lowest score of the competition for 8 out of his 10 dances.

Each couple performed two routines. Couples are listed in the order they performed.

Couple	Scores	Dance	Music	Result
George & Luda	21 (7, 7, 7)	Jive	"Baby I'm Getting Better" — Gyroscope	Safe
George & Luda	23 (7, 8, 8)	Viennese waltz	"That's Amore" — Dean Martin	Safe
Rob & Alana	25 (9, 8, 8)	Paso doble	"Barracuda" — Heart	Bottom two
Rob & Alana	27 (9, 9, 9)	Quickstep	"Town Called Malice" — The Jam	Bottom two
Alex & Arsen	24 (8, 8, 8)	Samba	"Hip Hip Chin Chin" — Club des Belugas	Bottom two
Alex & Arsen	23 (7, 8, 8)	Tango	"Tainted Love" — Soft Cell	Bottom two
David & Liza	19 (6, 6, 7)	Aussie Smooth	"Missing You" — John Waite	Withdrew
David & Liza	17 (5, 6, 6)	Cha-cha-cha	"If I Had You" — Adam Lambert	Withdrew
Tamara & Carmelo	30 (10, 10, 10)	Salsa	"Oye!" — Gloria Estefan	Safe
Tamara & Carmelo	26 (8, 9, 9)	Viennese waltz	"Fallin'" — Alicia Keys	Safe

=== Week 9 ===
Week 9: Each couple performed a dance chosen by the judges as a redemption dance. After the first round, Rob and Alana were in first place with 28/30, with Alex and Arsen in last place with 17/30. Each couple then performed a segue dance, with both Tamara and Carmello and Rob and Alana receiving 28/30, and George and Luda and Alex and Arsen receiving 24/30. Australian performer Vanessa Amorosi performed her new song Holiday which was accompanied by a dance by some of the professional cast. All four couples participated in a Swing Dance Off, with the winner receiving 10 points added to their final score. Tamara and Carmelo won the 10 points and won first place for the night, with a total of 65/70. Rob and Alana were in the bottom two with George and Luda. George Houvardas was eliminated.

Each couple performed two routines, one of which chosen by the judges and the other of which was a segue of three different dance styles. The four couples then competed in a swing dance-off where the judges awarded ten bonus points to the couple they felt performed the best. Couples are listed in the order they performed.

Couple	Scores	Dance	Music	Result
Alex & Arsen	17 (5, 6, 6)	Jive	"Untouched" — The Veronicas	Safe
Alex & Arsen	24 (8, 8, 8)	Segue (Viennese waltz, Foxtrot & Salsa)	"The Only Exception" — Paramore, "My Girl" — The Temptations & "La Isla Bonita"—Madonna	Safe
Tamara & Carmelo	27 (9, 9, 9)	Quickstep	"We No Speak Americano" — Yolanda Be Cool	Safe
Tamara & Carmelo	28 (9, 9, 10)	Segue (Tango, Paso doble & Cha-cha-cha)	"Tango Flamenco" — Gypsy Kings, "Ave Mary A" — Pink & "California Gurls" — Katy Perry	Safe
George & Luda	20 (6, 7, 7)	Tango	"Bad Romance" — Lady Gaga	Eliminated
George & Luda	24 (8, 8, 8)	Segue (Viennese waltz, Samba & Cha-cha-cha)	"Still Got the Blues" — Gary Moore, "Say Hey" — Michael Franti & The Spearheads & "In My Head" — Jason Derulo	Eliminated
Rob & Alana	28 (9, 9, 10)	Jive	"What I Like About You" — The Romantics	Bottom two
Rob & Alana	28 (9, 10, 9)	Segue (Foxtrot, Salsa & Cha-cha-cha)	"True" — Spandau Ballet, "Late in the Evening" — Paul Young & "Let Me Entertain You" — Robbie Williams	Bottom two
Alex & Arsen	No scores received	Group; Swing	"In The Mood" — Benny Goodman & His Orchestra, "Rock Around The Clock" — Bill Haley & The Comets, "Wake Up Little Susie" — The Everly Brothers, "Hound Dog" — Elvis Presley & "Shake, Rattle & Roll" — Jerry Lee Lewis	
Rob & Alana	No scores received	Group; Swing	"In The Mood" — Benny Goodman & His Orchestra, "Rock Around The Clock" — Bill Haley & The Comets, "Wake Up Little Susie" — The Everly Brothers, "Hound Dog" — Elvis Presley & "Shake, Rattle & Roll" — Jerry Lee Lewis	
George & Luda	No scores received	Group; Swing	"In The Mood" — Benny Goodman & His Orchestra, "Rock Around The Clock" — Bill Haley & The Comets, "Wake Up Little Susie" — The Everly Brothers, "Hound Dog" — Elvis Presley & "Shake, Rattle & Roll" — Jerry Lee Lewis	
Tamara & Carmelo	10	Group; Swing	"In The Mood" — Benny Goodman & His Orchestra, "Rock Around The Clock" — Bill Haley & The Comets, "Wake Up Little Susie" — The Everly Brothers, "Hound Dog" — Elvis Presley & "Shake, Rattle & Roll" — Jerry Lee Lewis	

=== Week 10 ===
Week 10: The Grand Final began with each couple completing an unlearned dance from throughout the series. Tamara and Carmelo received another perfect score for their Rumba, putting them in first place after round one, with Alex and Arsen in third place with 23/30 for their Aussie Smooth. The Australian cast of the musical Hairspray then performed a medley of songs from their upcoming tour. All three finale couples participated in a Cha-Cha-Cha Face Off, which was learned 24 hours prior to the Grand Final night. Tamara and Carmello received 27/30, Rob and Alana received 23/30, while Alex and Arsen received 22/30. All eight previously eliminated couples, including David Wirrpanda, returned to the dance floor to perform their favourite dances of the season. Alex and Arsen were eliminated in third place but still performed their freestyle dance. Tamara and Carmelo performed their freestyle which they learned only two days prior to the finale, earning 27/30. Rob and Alana received a 30/30 for their final freestyle dance. At the end of the night, Tamara and Carmelo led the scoreboard with 84/90 for their three dances, while Rob and Alana earned 75/90. Despite earning second place on the scoreboard, Rob Palmer and his partner Alana Patience were named the Champions of Dancing With The Stars for 2010.

Each couple performed their favourite dance of the season and a group cha-cha-cha, after which the couple with the lowest combined score was eliminated, and then the remaining two couples performed their freestyle routines. Couples are listed in the order they performed.

Couple	Order	Scores	Dance	Music	Result
Rob & Alana	1	24 (8, 8, 8)	Samba	"Mambo Jambo" — Perez Prado	Winners
Rob & Alana	5	30 (10, 10, 10)	Freestyle	"You Shook Me All Night Long" — AC/DC	Winners
Alex & Arsen	2	23 (7, 8, 8)	Aussie Smooth	"You Were Meant For Me" — Jewel	Third place
Tamara & Carmelo	3	30 (10, 10, 10)	Rumba	"Llorando" — Rebekah Del Rio	Runners-up
Tamara & Carmelo	6	27 (9, 9, 9)	Freestyle	"Cinema Italiano" — Kate Hudson	Runners-up
Rob & Alana	4	23 (8, 8, 7)	Group; Cha-cha-cha	"Does Your Mother Know" — ABBA	
Alex & Arsen	4	22 (7, 7, 8)	Group; Cha-cha-cha	"Does Your Mother Know" — ABBA	
Tamara & Carmelo	4	27 (9, 9, 9)	Group; Cha-cha-cha	"Does Your Mother Know" — ABBA	

== Dance chart ==
- Week 1: Cha-cha-cha or Viennese waltz
- Week 2: Jive or tango
- Week 3: Foxtrot or paso doble
- Week 4: Quickstep or rumba
- Week 5: Samba or waltz
- Week 6: Aussie Smooth or salsa
- Week 7: Two unlearned dances
- Week 8: Two unlearned dances
- Week 9: Judges’ choice, segue & group swing dance
- Week 10: One unlearned dance, group cha-cha-cha & freestyle

Dancing with the Stars (season 10) - Dance chart
Couple	Week															
Couple	1	2	3	4	5	6	7		8		9			10		
Rob & Alana	Viennese waltz	Jive	Foxtrot	Rumba	Waltz	Salsa	Cha-cha-cha	Tango	Paso doble	Quickstep	Jive	Segue	Group; Swing	Samba	Group; Cha-cha-cha	Freestyle
Tamara & Carmelo	Cha-cha-cha	Tango	Paso doble	Quickstep	Samba	Aussie Smooth	Foxtrot	Jive	Salsa	Viennese waltz	Quickstep	Segue	Group; Swing	Rumba	Group; Cha-cha-cha	Freestyle
Alex & Arsen	Viennese waltz	Jive	Foxtrot	Rumba	Waltz	Salsa	Quickstep	Cha-cha-cha	Samba	Tango	Jive	Segue	Group; Swing	Aussie Smooth	Group; Cha-cha-cha	
George & Luda	Cha-cha-cha	Tango	Paso doble	Quickstep	Samba	Aussie Smooth	Salsa	Foxtrot	Jive	Viennese waltz	Tango	Segue	Group; Swing			
David & Liza	Viennese waltz	Jive	Foxtrot	Rumba	Waltz	Salsa	Samba	Quickstep	Aussie Smooth	Cha-cha-cha						
Esther & Brendon	Cha-cha-cha	Tango	Paso doble	Quickstep	Samba	Aussie Smooth	Viennese waltz	Jive								
Rachael & Michael	Cha-cha-cha	Tango	Paso doble	Quickstep	Samba	Aussie Smooth										
Melinda & Serghei	Cha-cha-cha	Tango	Paso doble	Quickstep	Samba											
Jo Beth & Dannial	Viennese waltz	Jive	Foxtrot	Rumba												
Blair & Jessica	Cha-cha-cha	Tango	Paso doble													
Jason & Eliza	Viennese waltz	Jive														

Preceded by Dancing with the Stars (Australian season 9)	Dancing with the Stars (Australian version); Season 10	Succeeded by Dancing with the Stars (Australian season 11)
