= Alex Fevola =

Australian photographer

Alex Fevola (née Cheatham; born 9 April 1977) is an Australian photographer, make-up entrepreneur and wife to former AFL footballer Brendan Fevola. She married Brendan Fevola on 7 October 2005 at St John's Church, Toorak. Alex has worked as a model and photographer, operating a studio in Beaumaris. In 2009, she published a coffee table book, Snapshot: A Portrait of Success (ISBN 978-1-4075-5127-2). Fevola was a contestant on the 2010 season of Dancing with the Stars and finished third. She has four children: Mia, Leni, Lulu and Tobi.

Alex Fevola is the Founder & CEO of Runway Room Cosmetics. Alex Fevola's journey into the world of makeup artistry began during her early days as a model. Working closely with makeup artists, she witnessed firsthand the transformative power of cosmetics. This early immersion ignited a passion that went beyond applying makeup; it was about the confidence and self-discovery it unlocked. Fueled by this passion, Alex founded Runway Room in 2012.

Preceded by Kylie Gillies & Carmello Pizzino	Dancing with the Stars (Australia) third place contestant Season 10 (2010 with Arsen Kishishian)	Succeeded by Damien Leith & Melanie Hooper
