= Alana Patience =

Australian ballroom dancer

Alana Louise Patience (born 21 November 1980) is an Australian ballroom dancer and a two-time winner of Channel 7's Dancing with the Stars.

== Career ==
Patience studied acting at the Australian Academy of Dramatic Art (AADA), now known as the Australian Institute of Music – Dramatic Arts (AIMDA); however, she would take a break when she joined the Australian version of Dancing with the Stars, but she later returned and graduated in 2005.

In 2010, Alana and Better Homes and Gardens carpenter Rob Palmer—won season 10 of Dancing with the Stars, and again in 2011 with Celebrity chef Manu Feildel. Alana has also danced with music journalist Molly Meldrum, Tom Waterhouse, ex-Collingwood footballer Brodie Holland, and radio personality Brendan Jones. Patience was announced as part of the cast for the fourteenth season of Dancing with the Stars, but her assigned partner, comedian Paul Fenech, dropped out of the show before the season began (due to an arrest).

Alana's ballroom career has spanned over 20 years, and her titles include two-time Australian and South Pacific Youth Latin Champion and Australian Representative to the World Youth Latin Championships. Alana has performed in the Australian ballroom hit show Burn the Floor, touring the United States, China, Japan, Korea, New Zealand and Australia in both 2001 and 2007. In 2009, Alana moved to the Netherlands to join the international cast of the sold-out 18-month season of the musical version of Dirty Dancing.

In 2012, Alana opened the only Vera Wang bridal boutique in Australia as the boutique manager, located at the Intercontinental Hotel in Sydney. Alana also performs throughout Australia with her dance partner Carmelo Pizzino at various corporate, charity, and dance events.
