= Celebrity Splash! (Australian TV series) =

- Genre: Reality show
- Presented by: Larry Emdur; Kylie Gillies
- Judges: Matthew Mitcham; Alisa Camplin; Greg Louganis
- Country of origin: Australia
- Original language: English
- No. of seasons: 1
- No. of episodes: 5

Production
- Production locations: Sydney Olympic Park Aquatic Centre, Homebush Bay, New South Wales
- Running time: 90–120 minutes (including commercials)
- Production company: Eyeworks Australia

Original release
- Network: Seven Network
- Release: 29 April – 16 May 2013

Celebrity Splash! is an Australian reality television series that follows celebrities as they try to master the art of diving. The program premiered on the Seven Network on 29 April 2013 and was hosted by Larry Emdur and Kylie Gillies. The celebrities performed each week in front of a panel of judges and a live audience in an Olympic-size diving pool with the result each week partly determined by home viewers. After poor ratings, the show was moved from its original prime-time slot, with the second semi-final episode shelved. Instead, the show's final aired on 16 May 2013.

The format for the show was a franchise developed by television production company Eyeworks., and was broadcast on SBS 6 as Sterren Springen (Dutch for Celebrities Jump). The British version is known as Splash!.

== Cast ==
The cast was announced on 20 March 2013. Due to injury, Laura Csortan was forced to withdraw from the competition, with Derek Boyer coming in as a last-minute replacement.

Celebrity	Occupation	Result
Andrew Symonds	Former Queensland cricketer	Winner
Tamsyn Lewis	Olympic middle-distance runner	Runner-Up
Denise Drysdale	Television presenter	Finalists
Koby Abberton	Professional surfer	Finalists
Nick Bracks	Model	Eliminated 16 May
Adam Richard	Comedian, actor, & radio presenter	Eliminated 16 May
Paul Fenech	Actor	Eliminated 6 May
Brynne Edelsten	Socialite	Eliminated 6 May
Leisel Jones	Olympic swimmer	Eliminated 30 April
Demi Harman	Home and Away actress	Eliminated 30 April
Andrew Welsh	Retired AFL midfielder	Eliminated 30 April
Josh Thomas	Comedian	Eliminated 29 April
Renae Ayris	Miss Universe Australia 2012	Eliminated 29 April
Derek Boyer	Australia's Strongest Man	Eliminated 29 April
Laura Csortan	Television presenter	Withdrew 29 April

== Scoring chart ==
Eliminated by Default	Dive-off	Did Not Perform

Heat:		1	2	3	4	5	Averages			
Live show date:		29/4	30/4	6/5			Rank	Total score	# of dives	Average
Place	Celebrity	Result								
1	Andrew Symonds	50					–	0.00	0	0.00
2	Tamsyn Lewis	51					–	0.00	0	0.00
3	Koby Abberton						–	0.00	0	0.00
–	Nick Bracks						–	0.00	0	0.00
–	Adam Richard						–	0.00	0	0.00
–	Denise Drysdale						–	0.00	0	0.00
6-7	Paul Fenech	44					–	0.00	0	0.00
6-7	Brynne Edelsten	53					–	0.00	0	0.00
9-11	Demi Harman						–	0.00	0	0.00
9-11	Leisel Jones						–	0.00	0	0.00
9-11	Andrew Welsh						–	0.00	0	0.00
12–14	Josh Thomas	38					–	38.00	1	38.00
12–14	Renae Ayris	44					–	44.00	1	44.00
12–14	Derek Boyer	35					–	35.00	1	35.00
15	Laura Csortan	Quit					–	0.00	0	0.00
Dive-off		Paul Fenech	Nick Bracks	Tamsyn Lewis						
Dive-off		Josh Thomas	Demi Harman	Paul Fenech						
Louganis' vote to save		Paul Fenech	Nick Bracks	Tamsyn Lewis						
Camplin's vote to save		Paul Fenech	Nick Bracks	Tamsyn Lewis						
Mitcham's vote to save		Paul Fenech	Demi Harman	Tamsyn Lewis						
Eliminated		Josh Thomas; 0 of 3 votes	Demi Harman; 1 of 3 votes	Paul Fenech; 0 of 3 votes	Nick Bracks by default					
Eliminated		Renae Ayris by default	Leisel Jones by default	Brynne Edelsten by default	Adam Richard by default					
Eliminated		Derek Boyer by default	Andrew Welsh by default							

== Live show details ==
=== Heat 1 (29 April) ===
Celebrities' performances on first heat
Celebrity	Order	Dive		Louganis		Camplin		Mitcham		Total points	Result
Celebrity	Order	Type	Height	T	C	T	C	T	C	Total points	Result
Tamsyn Lewis	1	Armstand front somersault	7.5-metre	8	9	9	8	9	8	51	Through to semifinal
Josh Thomas	2	Forward 1 1/2 somersault tuck	3-metre springboard	4	8	6	7	6	7	38	Eliminated after dive-off
Andrew Symonds	3	Inward dive tuck	10-metre	8	9	8	9	7	9	50	Through to semifinal
Renae Ayris	4	Back fall-in	3-metre	7	7	8	7	8	7	44	Eliminated
Derek Boyer	5	Front jump straight	10-metre	3	9	3	9	2	9	35	Eliminated
Paul Fenech	6	Forward 1 1/2 somersault pike	5-metre	6	9	7	8	6	8	44	Through to semifinal after dive-off
Brynne Edelsten	7	Front fall-in	7.5-metre	8	10	8	9	8	10	53	Through to semifinal

Judges' vote to save

- Louganis – Paul Fenech
- Camplin – Paul Fenech
- Mitcham – Paul Fenech

=== Heat 2 (30 April) ===
Celebrities' performances on second heat
Celebrity	Order	Dive		Louganis		Camplin		Mitcham		Total points	Result
Celebrity	Order	Type	Height	T	C	T	C	T	C	Total points	Result
Koby Abberton											
Nick Bracks											
Denise Drysdale											
Demi Harman											
Leisel Jones											
Adam Richard											
Andrew Welsh											
