= Melinda Schneider =

Australian country singer (born 1971)

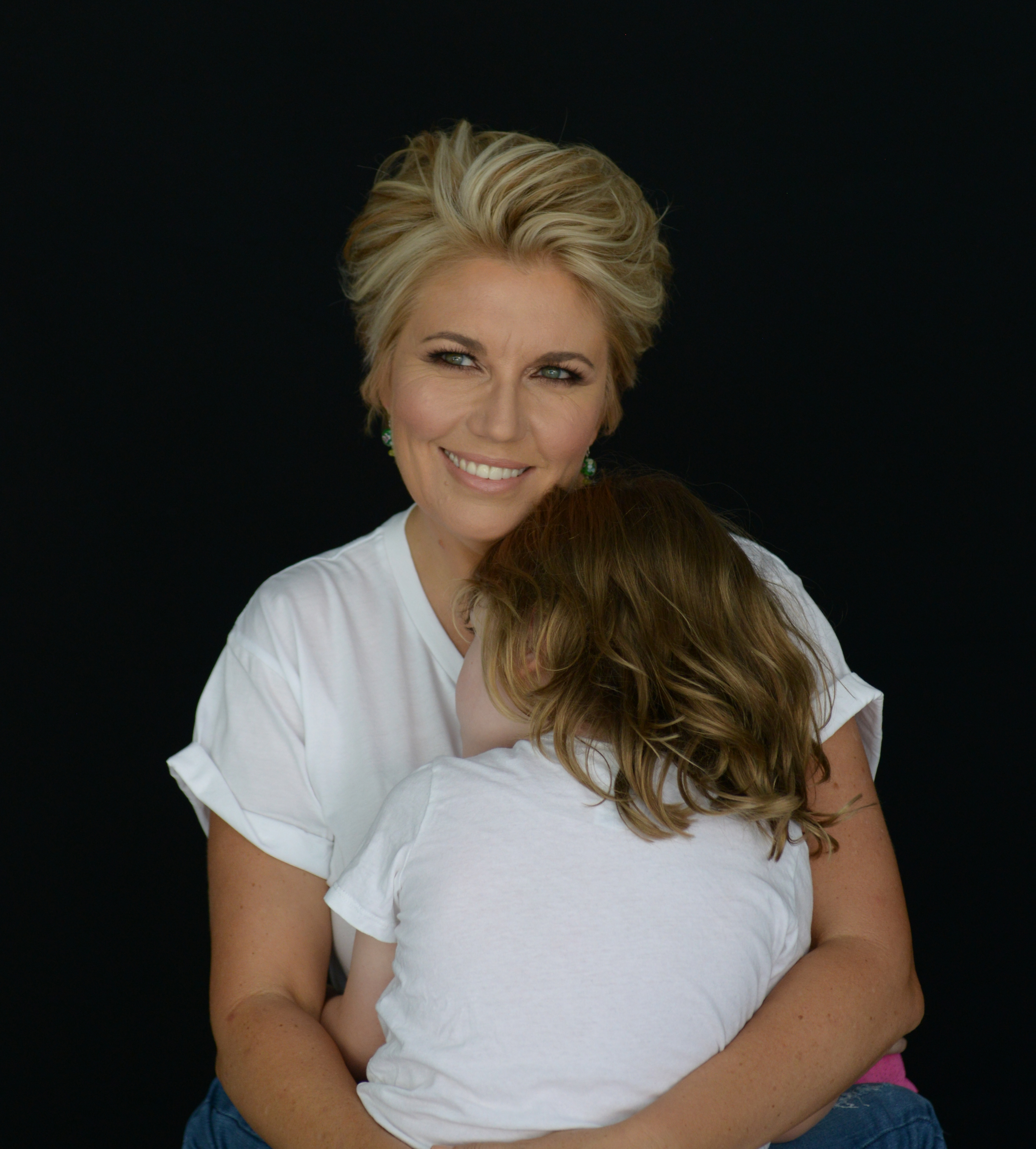
- Schneider and her son in 2018

Background information
- Born: Melinda-Jane Bean; 7 October 1971 (age 55); Sydney, Australia
- Genre: Country
- Occupations: Singer, songwriter, radio presenter
- Instruments: Guitar, vocals
- Years active: 1979–present
- Labels: Compass Bros; Be Music; Festival Records; Universal Music
- Website: melindaschneider.com

Melinda Schneider (born Melinda-Jane Bean; 7 October 1971) is an Australian country music singer. She has been performing since she was three and sang with her mother, yodelling country artist Mary Schneider, on the album The Magic of Yodelling at the age of eight.

Schneider is a multi-Golden Guitar winner at the Country Music Awards of Australia winning her sixth with Paul Kelly for 'Vocal Collaboration of the Year' for their duet "Still Here" in 2009.

== Career ==
Schneider studied dance as a child and made her acting debut on the popular Australian drama A Country Practice when aged thirteen. She also sang the theme music for the ABC TV series Something in the Air.

In 1994, Schneider featuring on Audio Murphy Inc.'s dance track "Tighten Up Your Pants" which peaked at number 39 on the ARIA Chart. The song mixed electronic beats and yodelling. The success of "Tighten Up Your Pants" earned her a three-album deal with Festival Records. Unsure of what kind of singer she wanted to be, Schneider foundered, eventually quitting Festival without making an album.

In 1999, Schneider performed the duet "Love Away the Night" with Adam Brand. In January 2000, the song won Schneider her first CMAA Award for Vocal Collaboration of the Year.

In 2000, Schneider released her debut studio album, My Oxygen. The album was recorded with the Nashville-based Australian producer Mark Moffatt.

In July 2002, Schneider released her second studio album, Happy Tears, which peaked at number 94 on the ARIA charts and was certified gold. Happy Tears was produced by her husband of five years, Graham Thompson, and released on his Compass Bros label.

In 2003, Schneider won her the first solo Golden Guitar for Female Vocal of the Year.

In May 2004, Schneider released Family Tree, which peaked at number 64 on the ARIA charts and was certified gold. The album earner Schneider her first ARIA Music Award nomination.

In 2006, Schneider was invited by Deborah Conway to take part in the Broad Festival project with three other Australian female artists. They performed their own and each other's songs. With Schneider and Conway were Mia Dyson, Kate Miller-Heidke and Ella Hooper.

In 2010, Schneider was a participant on the ABC Television program Bush Slam and a celebrity contestant on the Channel 7 show Dancing with the Stars partnered by Serghei Bolgarschii in Season 10.

In 2011, Schneider starred in the theatre show Doris: So Much More Than the Girl Next Door, written by Schneider and David Mitchell. The show told the story of Doris Day's life and was first performed at the Twelfth Night Theatre in Brisbane in May 2011.

In November 2014, Schneider released Great Women of Country, a collaboration with Beccy Cole. The album became her first to peak inside the ARIA top ten.

In 2022, Schneider performed a two-hour show titled Love Songs, celebrating the love she has found with her long-time partner, Mark Gable. In May 2022, Schneider released a compilation album of the same name.

In August 2026, Schneider will release the album The Way We Were: Melinda Schneider Sings the Songs of Barbra Streisand and support it with an Australian tour.

== Personal life ==
Schneider is the daughter of singer-songwriter and yodeller Mary Schneider. She attended St Joseph's Kogarah (now known as Bethany College) for her high school years. Schneider is married to Mark Gable, the lead singer of the Choirboys. They were married in September 2022 on Killcare Beach, New South Wales, after 14 years together.

== Radio ==
Schneider was the host of her own radio progrsam, Love Songs with Melinda Schneider, on Star 104.5 FM. The program aired every weeknight in 2015 from 8 pm. As the title indicates, the program was focused on songs of a romantic nature. This was Schneider's first radio program as host.

== Discography ==
=== Studio albums ===
| Title | Album details | Peak chart positions | Certifications (sales thresholds) |
| Title | Album details | AUS | Certifications (sales thresholds) |
|---|---|---|---|
| My Oxygen | Released: July 2000; Label: Festival Records (D24178); Compass Brothers (2001 re-release) (002CDCB) | 129 | |
| Happy Tears | Released: July 2002; Label: Compass Brothers / Festival Records (009CDCB) | 94 | ARIA: Gold |
| Family Tree | Released: May 2004; Label: Compass Brothers / Sony (016CDCB) | 64 | ARIA: Gold |
| Stronger | Released: August 2006; Label: Compass Brothers / Sony (026CDCB) | 74 | |
| Be Yourself | Released: July 2008; Label: Be Music (CDR1119) | 83 | |
| Melinda Does Doris | Released: 30 July 2010; Label: Universal Music (2747553) | 24 | ARIA: Gold |
| Great Women of Country (with Beccy Cole) | Released: 7 November 2014; Label: Universal Music (4703930) | 9 | |
| Melinda Does Doris...Again – The Movie Songs | Released: October 2016; Label: Be Music / ABC Music (BEMUSIC005) | 97 | |
| Tender | Released: 6 February 2026; Label: Melinda Schneider (MPOWER013) | 97 | |
| The Way We Were: Melinda Schneider Sings the Songs of Barbra Streisand | Released: 7 August 2026; Label: Melinda Schneider (MPOWER014) | 93 | |

=== Live albums ===
| Title | Album details |
|---|---|
| Live at Tamworth | Released: July 2010; Label: Be Music (BEMUSIC001/BEMUSIC002) |

=== Compilation albums ===
| Title | Album details | Peak chart positions |
| Title | Album details | AUS |
|---|---|---|
| Hits & Rarities | Released: 25 March 2008; Label: Compass Brothers / Universal Music (044CDCB) | 171 |
| Life Begins At 40: The Ultimate Melinda Schneider Collection | Released: 21 October 2011; Label: Be Music (BEMUSIC004) | 148 |
| A Farewell to Doris | Released: September 2019; Label: Be Music (BEMUSIC006) | 58 |
| Love Songs | Released: 8 May 2022; Label: MPower Records (MPOWER002) | - |

=== Extended plays ===
| Title | EP details |
|---|---|
| Melinda Does Elton | Released: 4 September 2020; Label: Melinda Schneider |
| Be Gentle On Yourself | Released: 7 October 2020; Label: Melinda Schneider |

=== Charting singles ===
List of singles within the ARIA top 100, with selected chart positions
| Title | Year | Peak chart positions |
| Title | Year | AUS |
|---|---|---|
| "Tighten Up Your Pants" (Audio Murphy Inc. featuring Melinda) | 1994 | 39 |

== Awards and nominations ==
=== ARIA Music Awards ===
The ARIA Music Awards is an annual awards ceremony that recognises excellence, innovation, and achievement across all genres of Australian music. Schneider has been nominated for two awards.

| Year | Nominee / work | Award | Result |
|---|---|---|---|
| 2004 | Family Tree | Best Country Album | Nominated |
| 2008 | Be Yourself | Best Country Album | Nominated |

=== Country Music Awards (CMAA) ===
The Country Music Awards of Australia (CMAA) is an annual awards night held in January during the Tamworth Country Music Festival and celebrates recording excellence in the Australian country music industry. Schneider has won six awards.

| Year | Nominee / work | Award | Result(wins only) |
|---|---|---|---|
| 2000 | "Love Away the Night" with Adam Brand | Vocal Collaboration of the Year | Won |
| 2003 | "The Story of My Life" | Female Vocalist of the Year | Won |
| 2005 | Family Tree | Album of the Year | Won |
| 2005 | "Real People" | Song of the Year | Won |
| 2008 | Stronger | Top Selling Album of the Year | Won |
| 2009 | "Still Here" with Paul Kelly | Vocal Collaboration of the Year | Won |

=== Mo Awards ===
The Australian Entertainment Mo Awards (commonly known informally as the Mo Awards), were annual Australian entertainment industry awards. They recognise achievements in live entertainment in Australia from 1975 to 2016. Melinda Schneider won eleven awards in that time.

| Year | Nominee / work | Award | Result (wins only) |
|---|---|---|---|
| 1994 | Melinda Schneider | Johnny O'Keefe Encouragement Award | Won |
| 2000 | Melinda Schneider | Female Country Entertainer of the Year | Won |
| 2002 | Melinda Schneider | Female Country Entertainer of the Year | Won |
| 2003 | Melinda Schneider | Female Country Entertainer of the Year | Won |
| 2004 | Melinda Schneider | Female Country Entertainer of the Year | Won |
| 2006 | Melinda Schneider | Slim Dusty Country Performer of the Year | Won |
| 2007 | Melinda Schneider | Female Vocal Performer of the Year | Won |
| 2008 | Melinda Schneider | Female Vocal Performer of the Year | Won |
| 2011 | Melinda Schneider | Slim Dusty Country Act of the Year | Won |
| 2011 | Melinda Schneider | Female Vocal Performer of the Year | Won |
| 2014 | Melinda Schneider | Slim Dusty Country Act of the Year | Won |
