= Nathan Bracken =

Australian cricketer (born 1977)

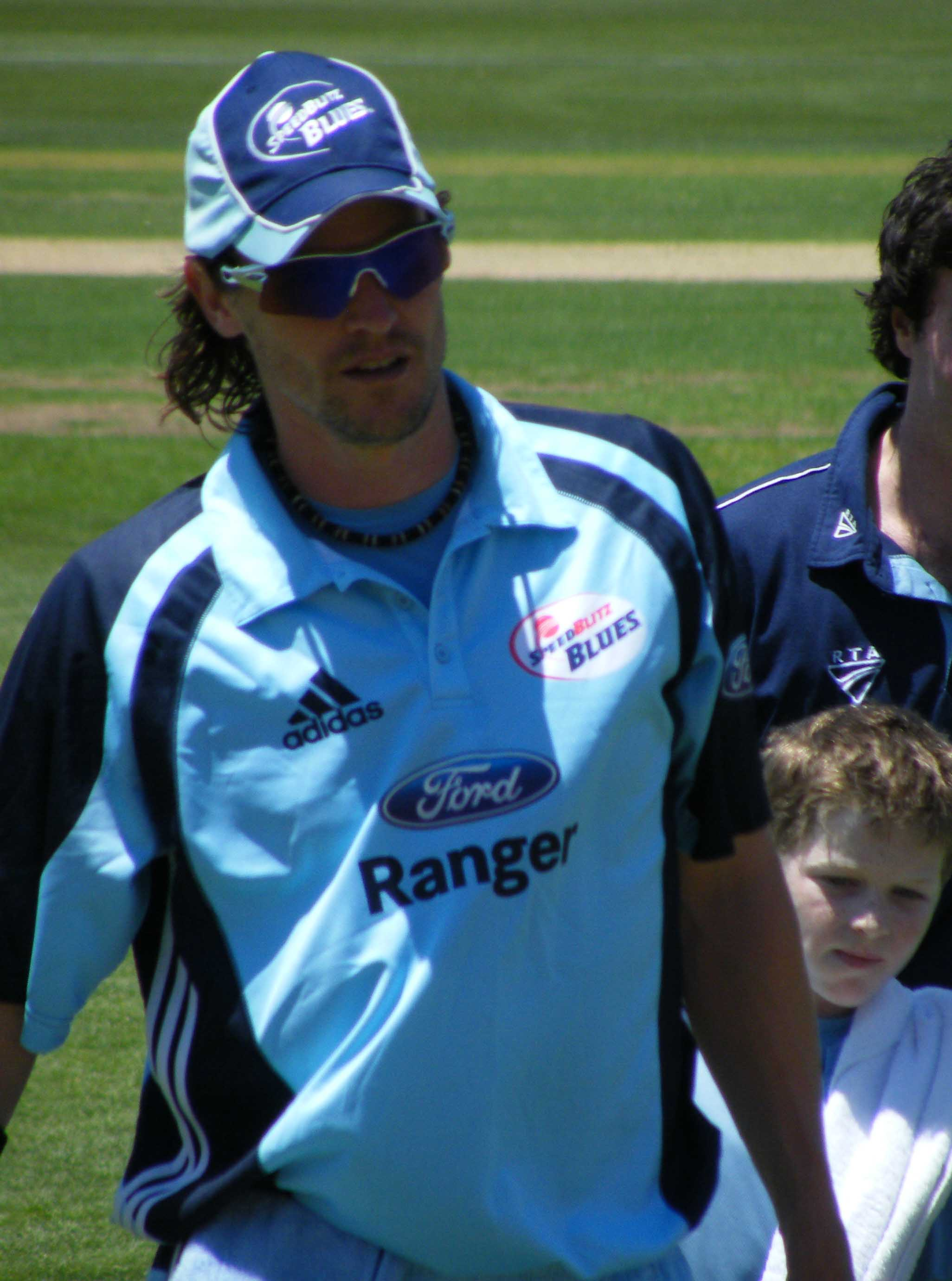

Personal information
- Full name: Nathan Wade Bracken
- Born: 12 September 1977 (age 49); Penrith, New South Wales, Australia
- Nickname: Bracks, Andy G
- Height: 195 cm (6 ft 5 in)
- Batting: Right-handed
- Bowling: Left-arm fast-medium
- Role: Bowler

International information
- National side: Australia (2001–2009)
- Test debut (cap 387): 4 December 2003 v India
- Last Test: 16 December 2005 v South Africa
- ODI debut (cap 142): 11 January 2001 v West Indies
- Last ODI: 17 September 2009 v England
- ODI shirt no.: 59
- T20I debut (cap 14): 9 January 2006 v South Africa
- Last T20I: 8 June 2009 v Sri Lanka
- T20I shirt no.: 59

Domestic team information
- Years: Team
- 1998/99–2009/10: New South Wales
- 2004: Gloucestershire

Career statistics
Competition	Test	ODI	T20I	FC
Matches	5	116	19	67
Runs scored	70	198	15	1007
Batting average	17.50	11.64	5.00	17.36
100s/50s	0/0	0/0	0/0	0/1
Top score	37	21*	4*	63
Balls bowled	1,110	5,759	377	13,614
Wickets	12	174	19	215
Bowling average	42.08	24.36	23.05	26.06
5 wickets in innings	0	2	0	9
10 wickets in match	0	0	0	0
Best bowling	4/48	5/47	3/11	7/4
Catches/stumpings	2/–	26/–	6/–	18/–
Medal record
Men's Cricket
Representing Australia
ICC Cricket World Cup
Winner	2003 South Africa-Zimbabwe-Kenya
Winner	2007 West Indies
ICC Champions Trophy
Winner	2006 India
- Source: CricketArchive, 19 September 2009

Nathan Wade Bracken (born 12 September 1977) is a former Australian cricketer. A tall left-arm fast-medium bowler, Bracken is capable of swinging the ball both ways. He has represented Australia in all forms of the game. Bracken represented New South Wales in Australian domestic cricket, Eastern Suburbs in Sydney Grade Cricket and also appeared for English County team Gloucestershire in 2004. On 28 January 2011 he announced his retirement from the game due to a chronic knee injury. On 9 February 2012 it was reported that he sued Cricket Australia over the latter's alleged incompetency in managing his knee injury. With his time representing Australia, Bracken won multiple ICC titles with the team: the 2003 Cricket World Cup, the 2007 Cricket World Cup, and the 2006 ICC Champions Trophy.

== Early and personal life ==
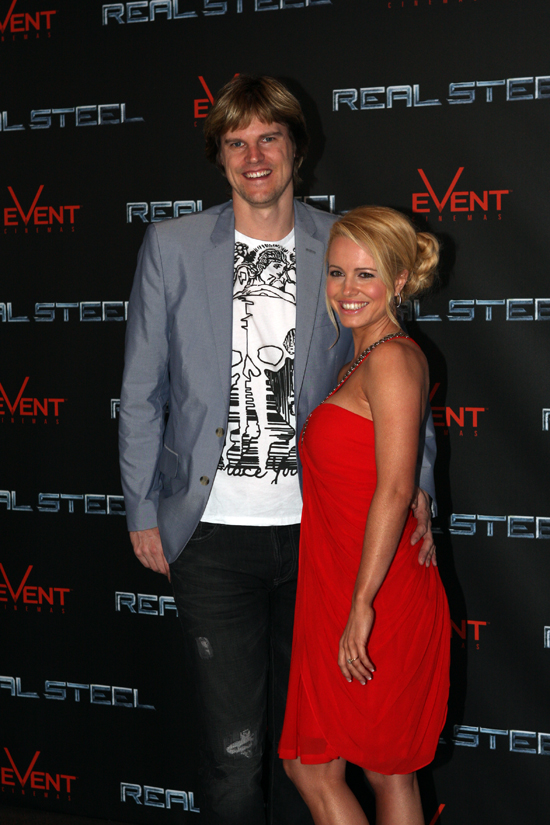
Bracken with his wife, Haley (2011)

Nathan Bracken was born in Penrith, New South Wales to parents Gordon and Robin. He spent his childhood living in the Blue Mountains region of New South Wales, attending Faulconbridge Primary and Springwood High School. He currently resides on the Central Coast of New South Wales and is married to Haley Bracken with whom he has 2 children. He is also studying for an undergraduate degree in communications. Bracken contested the Australian House of Representatives seat of Dobell as an independent against sitting member Craig Thomson at the 2013 federal election and received an 8.2 percent primary vote.

== Domestic career ==
=== First-class cricket ===
After a stint at the Australian Cricket Academy in 1997, Bracken made his first-class debut for New South Wales against Queensland on 27 October 1998 at Manuka Oval, Canberra. New South Wales were beaten by an innings and Bracken finished with figures of 0/86 off 41 overs. He played 5 more first-class matches in the 1998–99 season and finished with 11 wickets at a respectable average of 30.36. The 1999–00 season saw Bracken only play one match, however the 2000–01 season was one of great success for Bracken. He finished the season as New South Wales second leading wicket-taker behind Stuart MacGill with 29 wickets at 23.72. As a result of his outstanding season he was rewarded with a place in the Australian squad for the 2001 Ashes tour, a Cricket Australia contract and won the 2001 Bradman Young Cricketer of the Year award.

After recovering from a shoulder injury he sustained on the 2001 Ashes tour, Bracken played 8 matches for New South Wales in the 2001–02 season. He had a successful season once again, claiming 24 wickets at 31.79 and finishing behind Stuart Clark as the second leading wicket taker for New South Wales. 2002–03 was a season that saw Bracken struggle as he only took 16 wickets in 6 matches at a rather expensive 36.62. 2003–04 saw Bracken make his Test debut and as a result, he appeared less frequently for New South Wales. Despite this, he still performed well in the 4 matches he participated in, taking 16 wickets at 24.75. Following this season, Bracken was signed by Gloucestershire to play in the English first-class competition as a replacement for Mike Smith. Bracken only played 2 matches for the club, however he was quite successful and took 5 wickets at 21.20 with best figures of 2/12 coming against Lancashire.

2004–05 was Bracken's best season for New South Wales to date. He played in all 11 matches and took 43 wickets at an average of 18.79. The season contained a number of memorable performances by Bracken including a phenomenal spell of 7/4 off 7 overs to help dismiss South Australia for a mere 29 runs at the Sydney Cricket Ground on 2 December 2004. The figures were Bracken's best ever at the time, and are amongst the most impressive figures seen in Australian domestic cricket history. He also played an enormous part in New South Wales' thrilling 1 wicket win in the final against Queensland, winning Man of the Match. Bracken claimed 6/27 in 13.2 overs to help bowl out Queensland for 102 in their first innings and took an important 2/54 in their second innings. To add to this, Bracken scored an invaluable 11* to guide his team home to their target of 183 after New South Wales were 9/161, still needing 22 for victory. 2005–06 saw a return to the Test team for Bracken and as a result, fewer matches for New South Wales. Bracken still performed strongly in his few games, taking 13 wickets at 17.53. After only playing 2 matches in the 2006–07 season, the Blues enjoyed Bracken's services in their Pura Cup winning 2007–08 season as he appeared in the final and took 22 wickets at 21.22 during the season.

=== List A cricket ===
Bracken made his List A debut for New South Wales against the now defunct Canberra Comets on 31 October 1998 at Manuka Oval, Canberra. New South Wales won the match and Bracken was rather economical taking 0/19 off his 5 overs. After a Man of the Match performance against Queensland in the semi-final of the Mercantile Mutual Cup, Bracken was selected in the New South Wales team to meet Victoria in the final in only his 5th List A game. Bracken was economical, taking 0/28 off his 10 overs however New South Wales still lost the final by 39 runs.

After only playing one match in the 1999–00 season, the 2000–01 season proved to be a successful one for Bracken as he made his One Day International debut and helped New South Wales to win the Mercantile Mutual Cup. Bracken took 11 wickets at an average of 25.00, including figures of 2/43 in the final against Western Australia. He continued his good form into the 2001–02 season, helping New South Wales claim their second consecutive One Day title, this time over Queensland. Bracken took 18 wickets at 21.88 during the season, which included his best List A performance to date, as he took 5/38 against Victoria at the Melbourne Cricket Ground. 2002–03 was another successful season for both Bracken and New South Wales, as the Blues recorded their third consecutive domestic One Day title and Bracken claimed 15 scalps at 23.66. Bracken was once again a leading performer in the final, taking 2/35 off his 10 overs as New South Wales cruised to a 7 wicket win.

After three seasons of success, Bracken struggled for New South Wales in both the 2003–04 and 2004–05 seasons taking 3 wickets at 76.33 and 7 wickets at 44.71 respectively. International commitments left Bracken out of the side for a large majority of the 2005–06 One Day season, however he performed well in his limited appearances, claiming 5 wickets at 21.60. Once again, Bracken's international duties kept him out of a large majority of the 2006–07 and 2007–08 seasons and he took 3 wickets at 54.33 and 5 wickets at 37.80 respectively.

== International career ==
=== Test cricket ===
Bracken made his Test debut for Australia on 4 December 2003 against India in the Border–Gavaskar Trophy as a replacement for the injured Glenn McGrath. In a drawn Test, Bracken had a respectable debut Test claiming 1/90 off 26 overs in the first innings and 2/12 off 4 overs in the second. Despite this, Bracken was dropped for Western Australian paceman Brad Williams for the Second Test at Adelaide. The selectors chose Bracken ahead of Andrew Bichel for the final two Tests and in a drawn series that saw most bowlers struggle, he finished with 6 wickets at 58.50.

Due to the strength of fast bowling in Australia, Bracken was kept out of the Test team for nearly 2 years until he was selected in the Australian side for the 1st Test of the 2005–06 Frank Worrell Trophy against the West Indies in Brisbane. It was in this match that Bracken recorded both his best Test batting and bowling performances to date. In Australia's first innings he struck 37 off 51 balls and in the West Indians' second innings, Bracken claimed figures of 4/48 off 16 overs including the wickets of Brian Lara and Shivnarine Chanderpaul. Despite this good all-round performance, leg spinner Stuart MacGill was favoured by the selectors for the remaining Tests in the series. In December 2005, Bracken played the 1st Test against South Africa at the WACA Ground before once again being dropped in favour of Stuart MacGill.

Bracken has not played another Test since then due to the rise of Stuart Clark and Mitchell Johnson however in February 2008 he claimed that he was still eager to claim a spot in the Test team. Bracken is considered unlucky by many for his lack of Test starts given his one-day form – leading to comparisons with Michael Bevan.

=== One Day cricket ===
Bracken made his debut for Australia on 11 January 2001 against the West Indies. Although putting in respectable performances with the ball, he could not manage an assured place in the side due to both injuries and the strength of the Australian team. However, after Jason Gillespie was dropped from the national side, Bracken returned for the 2005 ICC Super Series against the World XI. This began the start of a sustained run in the national team and rise of Bracken as an international cricketer.

In the record-breaking fifth ODI during Australia's Tour of South Africa in 2006, Bracken achieved his maiden 5 wicket haul, taking 5–67 off 10 overs. He was the only bowler in the match to concede less than 7 runs an over. From the third ODI of that tour until the 5th match of the Commonwealth Bank series in 2007, Bracken went on a 17 match streak of taking at least a wicket a game. His consistency was rewarded with a place in the 2007 World Cup winning team and took 16 wickets during the campaign.

On 8 February 2008, Bracken achieved his best ever international figures taking 5–47 against Sri Lanka in Sydney. On 8 July Bracken displaced Daniel Vettori as the no. 1 ranked ODI bowler in the world following the series against the West Indies. He was also named in the ICC World ODI team of the year in 2008 and awarded Australia's ODI player of the year at the 2009 Allan Border Medal ceremony. Bracken played his last ODI on 17 September 2009 after succumbing to a knee injury and being ruled out of the 2009 ICC Champions Trophy. This would be his last appearance in Australian colours as the selectors moved on towards younger players. Bracken later announced he would quit from all forms of international cricket on 29 January 2011.

He finished with 174 ODI wickets at an average of 24.36 and proved to be a vital member of the Australian One Day International side during his career. With a combination of accuracy, swing and cutters, Bracken established himself as one of the most effective limited overs bowlers in the world.

== Career highlights ==
=== Tests ===
Test Debut: vs India at the Brisbane Cricket Ground, 4 December 2003 (cap 387).

- Bracken's 1st Test wicket was that of Virender Sehwag, caught by Matthew Hayden (1st match).
- Bracken's best bowling figures of 4/48 off 16 overs came against the West Indies at the Brisbane Cricket Ground, 6 November 2005
- Bracken's highest score of 37 came against the West Indies at the Brisbane Cricket Ground, 4 November 2005

=== One Day Internationals ===
One Day International Debut: vs West Indies at the Melbourne Cricket Ground, 11 January 2001 (cap 142).

- Bracken's 1st One Day International wicket was that of Sherwin Campbell, caught by Michael Bevan (1st match).
- Bracken's 50th One Day International wicket was that of Sanath Jayasuriya, caught by Andrew Symonds (31st match).
- Bracken's 100th One Day International wicket was that of Makhaya Ntini, bowled (60th match).
- Bracken's best bowling figures of 5/47 off 8.3 overs came against Sri Lanka at the Sydney Cricket Ground, 8 February 2008
- Bracken's highest score of 21* off 12 balls came against New Zealand at Jade Stadium, 10 December 2005
- Took figures of 3/22 against the West Indies in the final of the 2006 ICC Champions Trophy
- He was part of Australia's Cricket World Cup winning squads in both 2003 and 2007.

=== Twenty20 Internationals ===
Twenty20 International Debut: vs South Africa at the Brisbane Cricket Ground, 9 January 2006 (cap 14).

- Bracken's 1st Twenty20 International wicket was that of Boeta Dippenaar, caught by Brad Haddin (1st match).
- Bracken's best bowling figures of 3/11 off 2.3 overs came against India at the Melbourne Cricket Ground, 1 February 2008
- Bracken's highest score of 4 off 3 balls came against Zimbabwe at Newlands Cricket Ground, 12 September 2007

== Awards ==
- Bradman Young Cricketer of the Year – 2001.
- Bracken won three One Day International and one Twenty20 International Man of the Match awards.
- Man of the Series in the 2007–08 Commonwealth Bank Series.

== Achievements and records ==
- Bracken finished as Australia's leading wicket taker in One Day International cricket for the year 2006 with 46 wickets at an average of 18.82.
- Bracken reached 100 One Day International wickets in his 60th match. This made him the second fastest Australian to reach the milestone, equal with Shane Warne and Dennis Lillee.
- Pura Cup final winner: 2004–05, 2007–08
- Australian One Day Domestic Cup final winner: 2000–01, 2001–02, 2002–03
- ICC Champions Trophy final winner: 2006
- ICC Cricket World Cup final winner: 2007

== Post-career ==
After his retirement from cricket, Bracken stood as an Independent candidate in the 2013 election for the seat of Dobell. In 2023, he stood as the Liberal Party's candidate for The Entrance in the 2023 New South Wales state election. He was not elected.
