= Rob Palmer (presenter) =

Australian television presenter (born 1975)

- Born: 15 April 1975 (age 51); Australia
- Notable work: Presenter on Better Homes and Gardens, winner of Dancing with the Stars in 2010, Triple M Central Coast Radio Presenter.

Comedy career
- Medium: Television

Rob Palmer (born 15 April 1975) is an Australian television presenter. He is best known for presenting the Do It Yourself segments on several lifestyle programs on the Seven Network. He is currently a presenter on 107.7 Triple M Central Coast.

== Career ==
Palmer appeared on Channel Seven's Room For Improvement program (2001–2003), and also on the short-lived House Calls to the Rescue.

In 2004, he became the DIY section presenter on Better Homes and Gardens. At the end of December 2014, it was reported that his contract with Channel Seven was not renewed.

He won the 10th season of Dancing with the Stars in 2010.

== Personal life ==
Palmer married British former television presenter Gwenllian Jones in 2003. As of December 2014, they have one son and two daughters. He has type 1 diabetes, diagnosed when he was aged seven. Grew up in the Hills District of Sydney NSW. Attended: St Michaels Catholic Primary at Baulkham Hills. High School; St Ignatius College Riverview.
