= Rhythms of Resistance =

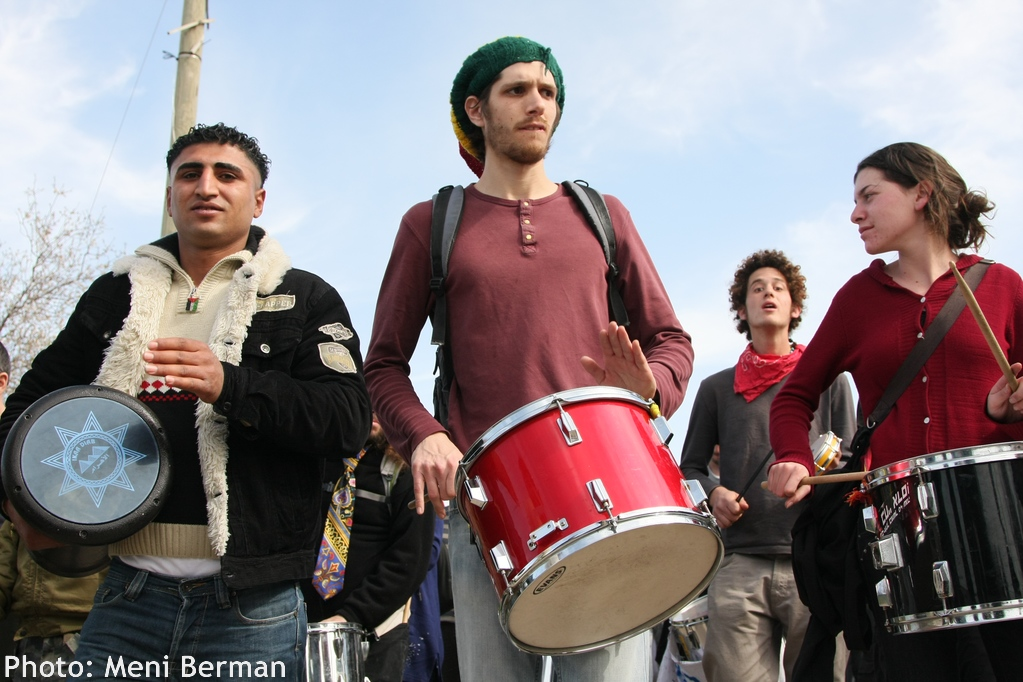
Israeli ROR in mass demo against the separation fence in Bil'in

Rhythms of Resistance, sometimes abbreviated to RoR, is a network of percussion bands that play at demonstrations and direct actions that fall within the broad definition of 'anti-capitalist'. Since RoR London was formed in 2000, similar groups have arisen around the world.

The name "Rhythms of Resistance" refers to the origins of African music that were introduced with slaves, sailors and traders from East Africa to Latin America and specifically Brazil, and is specifically taken from the book title "Rhythms of Resistance: African Musical Heritage in Brazil Cover" by Peter Fryer.

While not all such bands use the Rhythms of Resistance name, they generally share the same principles:

Rhythms of Resistance is a transnational, anti-hierarchical, anti-capitalist, anti-sexist and anti-racist network of various groups that fight together for social and ecological justice worldwide. Percussion is used as a basis for actions to demonstrate in a peaceful and playful way. This achieves a similar effect to that of the "Clown Army" at demonstrations.

The RoR network consists of different bands that connect under the RoR umbrella and work and act decentralized. In addition, there is shared exchange, shared participation and collaboration at a collective level. This is facilitated by the identical use of tunes (melodies) and hand signals (signs), so that it is easy to play along in groups from other cities and different groups can play together spontaneously. In addition, the simple system of tunes, which can be internalized using mnemonics, enables a low-threshold introduction to drumming, even without any special prior musical knowledge.

The RoR bands are often referred to as the "samba bands", because they use the same instruments. The self-designation ist "activist percussion band". RoR has similarities to the Afro Bloc parading drum bands that emerged in the mid 1970s in Salvador da Bahia in Brazil. Bands such as Ilê Aiyê and Olodum formed as a political expression of black awareness, resisting economic exclusion. Coming out of some impoverished urban communities, Afro blocs became a mobilising focus on picket lines and marches.

Rhythms of Resistance formed as part of the UK Earth First action against the International Monetary Fund/World Bank meeting in Prague in September 2000. A Pink and Silver carnival bloc, focused around a 55-piece band, detached itself from a march of 67,000 and outmaneuvered police resources defending the IMF annual summit. The protests also included a black bloc and a group from the Italian Ya Basta movement, and led to the shutting down of the summit.

Following this event, similar groups formed elsewhere making use of the same tactics. The RoR Amsterdam band formed in for the Rising Tide Actions against the Cop6 United Nations Climate Change Conference in November 2000 and joined together with ten drummers from Rhythms of Resistance to form a 65-piece band. Rhythms of Resistance groups can now be found across Europe, Middle East and in North America.

Instruments and clothing for performances are often made using the do-it-yourself principle.
