= Be Yourself (Melinda Schneider album) =

2008 album by Melinda Schneider

Studio album by Melinda Schneider
- Released: 7 July 2008
- Length: 42:34
- Label: Be Music Entertainment

Melinda Schneider chronology
Hits & Rarities (2008)	Be Yourself (2008)	Melinda Does Doris (2010)

Be Yourself is the fifth studio album by the Australian country music singer Melinda Schneider and the first on her own label Be Music Entertainment. The album was released on 7 July 2008 and peaked at number 83 on the ARIA Charts.

At the 2008 ARIA Music Awards, the album was nominated for Best Country Album. This was her second nomination for this award. At the 2009 Country Music Awards of Australia the song "Still Here" won Vocal Collaboration of the Year with Paul Kelly.

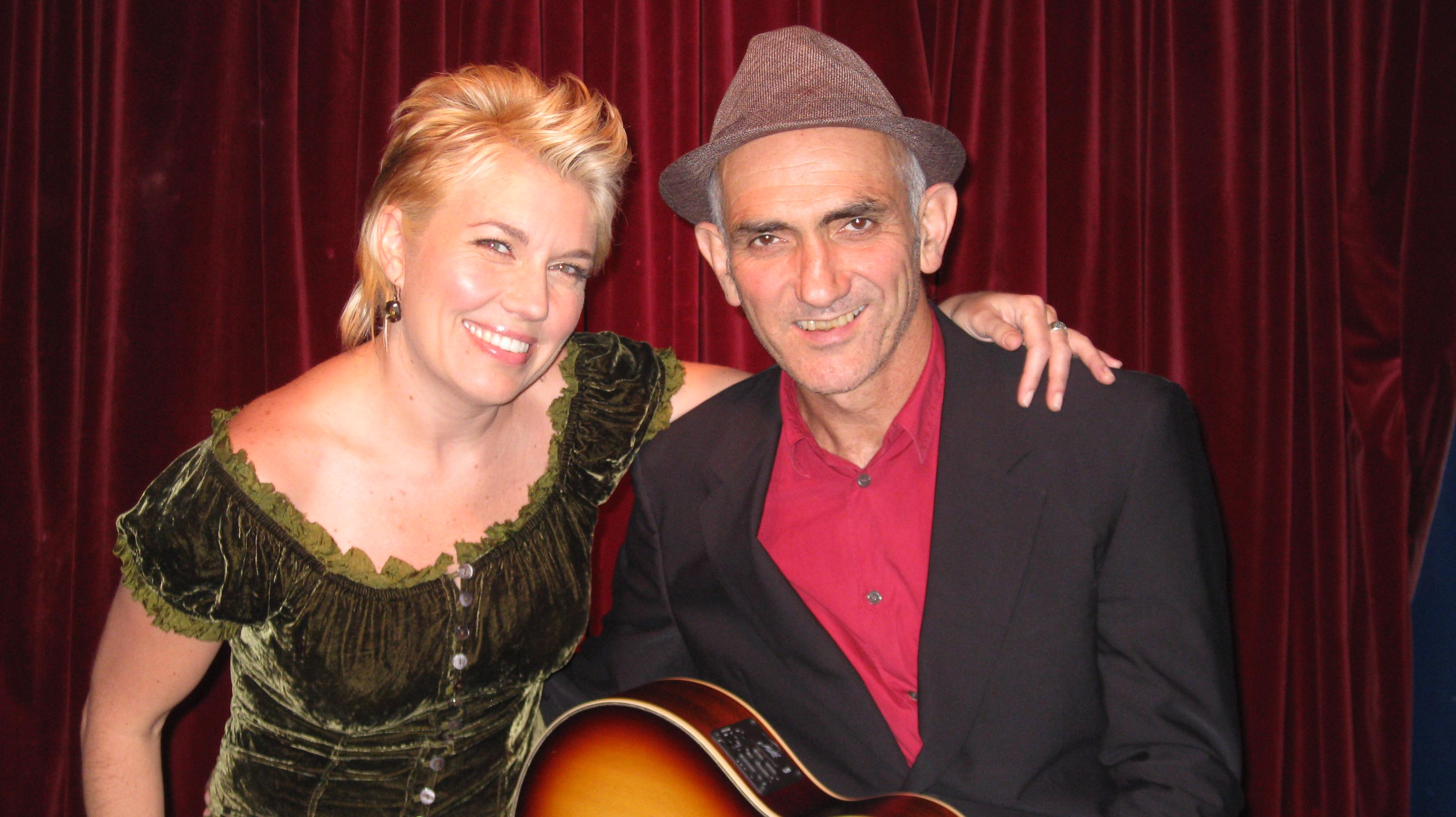
Country singer Melinda Schneider and Kelly collaborated on "Still Here". Photo taken in December 2008

== Track listing ==
1. "Be Yourself" - 3:40
2. "Courageous" - 3:36
3. "Cry a Little" - 3:42
4. "Grassy" - 3:09
5. "I'll Take Care of You" - 3:13
6. "Safe" - 3:29
7. "People Don't Change" - 3:04
8. "Still Here" (with Paul Kelly) - 3:20
9. "Outside" - 3:21
10. "Bad Day" - 3:51
11. "Understanding" - 3:15
12. "Thank You" - 4:39
13. "Awake Now" - 3:41

== Charts ==
Chart performance for Be Yourself
Chart (2008)	Peak position
Australian Albums (ARIA)	83
