= Geoffrey Edelsten =

Australian businessman (1943–2021)

- Born: Geoffrey Walter Edelsten; 2 May 1943; Melbourne, Victoria, Australia
- Died: 11 June 2021 (aged 78); Melbourne, Victoria, Australia
- Education: Mount Scopus Memorial College; Princes Hill Secondary College; University of Melbourne
- Occupations: Businessman; physician
- Years active: 1966–2021
- Spouses: Leanne Nesbitt (m. 1984–1988); Brynne Gordon (m. 2009–2014); Gabi Grecko (m. 2015)
- Children: 1
- Website: geoffedelsten.com.au

Geoffrey Walter Edelsten (2 May 1943 – 11 June 2021) was an Australian businessman and former physician known for founding the health care company Allied Medical Group.

Edelsten was a general practitioner whose unconventional clinics and luxurious lifestyle attracted media attention in the 1980s. He owned mansions, helicopters, and a fleet of Rolls-Royces and Lamborghinis with license plates such as Macho, Spunky and Sexy. His multidisciplinary clinics – the forerunners of modern corporate medical practices – were open 24 hours, and were fitted with chandeliers, grand pianos, and mink-covered examination tables.

Edelsten was struck off the medical registry in New South Wales in 1988 and later in Victoria. In 1990, he was jailed for perverting the course of justice and soliciting Christopher Dale Flannery to assault a former patient.

In 2005, Edelsten and a business partner founded Allied Medical Group, which by 2010 administered 17 medical centres and employed around 250 general practitioners. Edelsten was not, however, a shareholder or owner of the company.

Edelsten was the first private owner of a major Australian football team, the Sydney Swans, which he bought in 1985.

== Early life ==
Edelsten was born in Carlton, an inner suburb of Melbourne, on 2 May 1943. His parents, Hymie and Esther, established Linda Leigh, a lingerie retail chain. His grandparents on both sides were Jewish immigrants from Eastern Europe. Edelsten attended Princes Hill Public School and, in 1960, matriculated at Mount Scopus Memorial College, Australia's first Jewish co-educational school. He went on to study at the University of Melbourne, graduating with a Bachelor of Medicine, Bachelor of Surgery degree in 1966.

== Music career ==
In the 1960s, Edelsten owned a Melbourne-based record company, Hit Productions, which worked with music publishers Festival Records. During the same period, his family owned the Edels record retail chain.

In 1966, Edelsten was credited with co-writing the songs "I Can't Stop Loving You, Baby" and "A Woman Of Gradual Decline" for the group the Last Straws, whose singles were released on his short-lived Scope label.

In 1967, Hit Productions signed the group Cam-Pact, whose debut single, "Something Easy"/"Michael", charted in Melbourne in early 1968. Later in 1968, Edelsten co-produced the single "Love Machine" for the studio group Pastoral Symphony, comprising Glenn Shorrock and his band the Twilights, Ronnie Charles of the Groop and various other musicians.

== Early medical career ==
Following his graduation in 1966, Edelsten practised as a resident medical officer at the Royal Melbourne Hospital before entering general practice. As a general practitioner, he worked in remote rural regions of New South Wales and Queensland, including the towns of Wauchope, Aramac and Walgett, where he bought his first private practice. He obtained a private pilot's licence in order to provide medical services to remote communities – often at no cost to patients when they could not afford to pay.

In 1969, he and a colleague set up a new medical practice in the Sydney suburb of Coogee. After training an assistant doctor to perform the work in Walgett, Edelsten devoted more time to the Sydney practice, which soon expanded to Liverpool.

In 1971, Edelsten and a colleague, Tom Wenkart, launched Preventicare, a Sydney-based company providing diagnostic tests and computerised history-taking for doctors throughout Australia, using new equipment from the United States which could quickly and cheaply process pathology specimens. Preventicare quickly incurred debts, because some of its operations were economically unsound, and because of the slow payment of patients' accounts totalling far more than the company's debts. In July 1971, the Equity Court appointed a provisional liquidator to act as a temporary business manager to put the company's financial affairs in order. Later that year, the General Manager of Preventicare, Brian Wickens, reported that the organisation was on a sound financial footing. By 1975 – and under the new name of Morlea Pathology Services – it recorded annual profits of $2.5 million to $3 million. Macquarie Professional Services is the successor to Preventicare. During this period, Edelsten and his colleagues established eight practices in the Sydney area, and performed obstetrics at three western Sydney hospitals. After three years in Los Angeles, California, Edelsten returned to Australia in 1978 to resume his general practice, surgical and obstetric commitments.

Following the establishment of Medicare by the Hawke government in February 1984, Edelsten began to run innovative and multi-disciplinary 24-hour medical centres which were the forerunners of modern corporate medical practices. Decorated with chandeliers, white grand pianos and mink-covered examination tables, the clinics attracted considerable media attention. Edelsten's clinics were the first in Australia to bulk-bill patients to Medicare so that they incurred no direct cost. Within four months of opening, the first clinic was dealing with 2,000 patients every week. Edelsten eventually owned thirteen medical centres, in which approximately 20,000 patients consulted 200 doctors every week.

== Sydney Swans ==
On 31 July 1985, Edelsten became the first private owner of a major Australian football team, the Sydney Swans. A year later, Edelsten, on behalf of the Sydney Swans, tried to lure Essendon player Simon Madden with an offer of a three-year contract for a total of $550,000, although Madden chose to remain with Essendon for his entire career. Madden said that he never regretted his decision.

In July 1986, Edelsten tried to buy the Cronulla-Sutherland Sharks rugby league team, but his offer was refused by the game's administrators.

Edelsten was a long-term benefactor of the Carlton Football Club and in March 2013 the club awarded him life membership.

== De-registration and conviction ==
In 1988, New South Wales removed Edelsten from its medical register for using unqualified staff for laser surgery.

In 1990, he was convicted of perverting the course of justice and soliciting Christopher Dale Flannery to assault a former patient. The evidence used to convict Edelsten included a taped telephone conversation in which he and his wife discussed Flannery. Edelsten had provided a medical certificate in 1984 stating that Flannery was unfit to stand trial because of an infection following tattoo removal surgery, leading to the trial being adjourned and Flannery's case not being heard by a particular judge. Edelsten and Flannery's wife testified at a Victorian Medical Board hearing that Flannery was ill and in hospital and that he had no contact with Edelsten before or at the time of the assault. However, Edelsten was jailed for one year for perverting the course of justice and soliciting an assault.

In 1992, New South Wales politician Fred Nile told Parliament that since Edelsten's deregistration in the state, he had relocated to Victoria where he could practise medicine. Edelsten was subsequently removed from the Victorian medical register.

In 2001, Edelsten launched "Gene E", a company offering paternity testing by mail order. The service advertised on late-night television. Customers telephoned for a testing kit, which the company mailed to them. In five working days of receiving the completed test, the company returned the results to the customer by post.

Edelsten sought readmittance as a medical practitioner in New South Wales. In 2003, he told the NSW Medical Tribunal that he regretted his conduct and expressed remorse. Referring to his doctorate in philosophy from Pacific Western University, counsel assisting the Tribunal claimed that people could be misled by the words "professor" and "doctor" into thinking Edelsten could practise medicine. Edelsten told the commission that he would no longer use the doctor honorific if necessary. In 2004, the same tribunal banned Edelsten from applying again for four years.

== Later career ==
In 2005, Edelsten and a business partner founded Allied Medical Group. Allied Medical Group employs approximately 250 general practitioners, and runs seventeen "Superclinics" in Victoria, three in Queensland, and one in South Australia. The clinics offer extended opening hours and bulk-billing for patients to Medicare for most services, so that the patient incurs no direct cost. Following the Australian government's 2008 decision to open "GP Super Clinics" in 31 locations across the nation, Edelsten challenged the Department of Health's use of the word "superclinic", which he claimed to be a registered trademark belonging to Allied Medical Group. In 2011, Allied Medical Group was sold to Sonic Healthcare, in a deal worth up to $200 million.

In January 2014, Edelsten filed for bankruptcy in the United States. His Australian lawyers said this was a strategy to "better realise the investments made in the US".

In 2015, Edelsten was a contestant in the fourth season of The Celebrity Apprentice Australia.

== Personal life ==
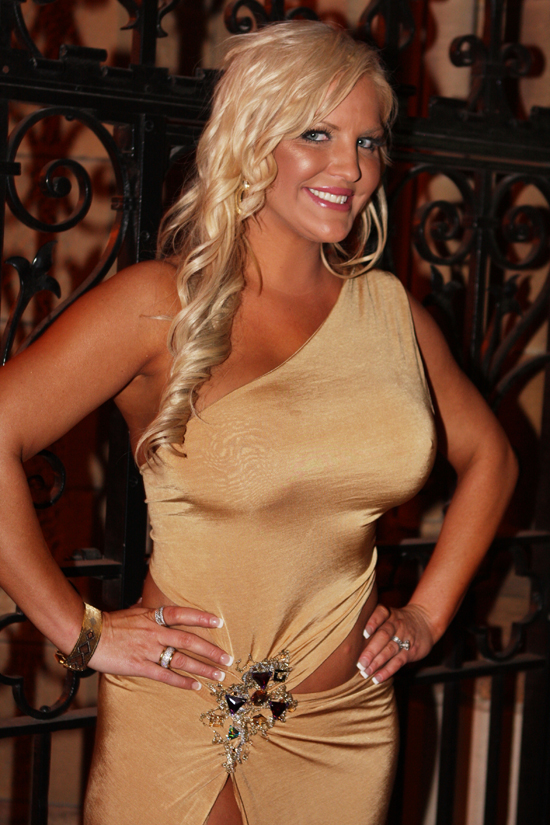
Edelsten's second wife Brynne

Edelsten met and married his first wife, Leanne Nesbitt, in the early 1980s. She was 19 years old and working as a model. During this period, his flamboyant lifestyle attracted media attention – he owned mansions, a football team, a fleet of Rolls-Royces and Lamborghinis with license plates such as Macho, Spunky and Sexy, and was associated, in the media, with a pink helicopter (although Edelsten and his wife insisted, in later interviews, that their helicopter was in fact blue and white). The couple was divorced after three years of marriage.

In January 2009, Edelsten announced his intention to marry Brynne Gordon, a 25-year-old fitness instructor from California. They were married on 29 November 2009, in Melbourne's Crown Casino. The wedding was alleged to have cost approximately $3 million and featured a helicopter, a Bentley, 550 guests, circus performers and performances by Tom Burlinson and other headline acts. Guests received a pre-wedding DVD about Edelsten and Gordon featuring narration by actor Jason Alexander, who gave an address at the wedding. Actress Fran Drescher also attended – although neither Alexander nor Drescher knew the couple.

Edelsten requested that guests attending his 2009 wedding not give wedding presents, but donate to the Great Expectations Foundation, a non-profit organisation he founded in 2008, which claimed to provide funds to charities including beyondblue, the Royal Children's Hospital and Magen David Adom. More than three years on, many of the charities once linked to Great Expectations had received no funds and, in at least one case, took moves to sever ties with Edelsten's foundation. A Fairfax Media investigation found that at least three charitable and not-for-profit groups had either never received money from Edelsten's foundation, or were unaware their names were being used to fund-raise from the public and wedding guests. They include the Royal Children's Hospital, the Lighthouse Foundation and the American Women's Auxiliary.

In June 2012, thieves stole luxury cars belonging to Edelsten, worth more than $1.4 million. Among them was a Lamborghini Aventador worth approximately $800,000 – one of only a handful of Aventadors in Australia.

In January 2014, it was announced that Edelsten's marriage to Brynne was over. Brynne said she was unable to forgive "her publicity-obsessed husband for a reported dalliance with another woman more than 18 months ago".

In July 2014, it was announced that Edelsten intended to marry Gabi Grecko, who is 46 years younger. Edelsten and Grecko married on 11 June 2015.

== Death ==
Edelsten was found dead at his Melbourne apartment on 11 June 2021, aged 78.

He was buried in a small service at Springvale Cemetery on 16 June 2021.
