= Dancing with the Stars (Australian TV series) season 12 =

Dancing with the Stars
- Season 12
- Presented by: Daniel MacPherson; Mel B
- Judges: Todd McKenney; Helen Richey; Joshua Horner
- Celebrity winner: Johnny Ruffo
- Professional winner: Luda Kroitor
- No. of episodes: 10

Release
- Original network: Seven Network
- Original release: 15 April – 17 June 2012

Season chronology
- ← Previous; Season 11 Next → Season 13

The twelfth season of Dancing with the Stars premiered on 15 April 2012, at the 6:30pm time slot on Channel Seven. With previous co-host Sonia Kruger defecting to Channel Nine, former Spice Girl and American Dancing with the Stars season 5 runner up Mel B was hired as her replacement. Daniel MacPherson continues his role as main host of the show, along with judges Todd McKenney, Helen Richey, and Joshua Horner.

== Background ==
The cast for the season were revealed on 13 March 2012 via the Seven website, along with their professional partners, although four contestants were revealed in late February 2012. This cast has been seen as a star increase on the previous year's cast, particularly with the addition of new international co-host Mel B, and former Nine daytime talkshow host Kerri-Anne Kennerley. Six new professional dancers, including former American Dancing with the Stars professional Damian Whitewood, Christopher Page, Elena Samodanova, Jess Prince, Gleb Savchenko and Damien Samuel have been recruited to replace non-returning professional dancers Alana Patience, Brendon Midson, Arsen Kishishian, Masha Belash, Jade Brand and Mark Hodge.

== Couples ==
This season featured eleven celebrities.

Celebrity	Notability	Professional partner	Status
Erin McNaught	Miss Universe Australia 2006	Gleb Savchenko	Eliminated 1st on 22 April 2012
Caine Eckstein	Ironman	Jess Prince	Eliminated 2nd on 29 April 2012
Vogue Williams	Model	Christopher Page	Eliminated 3rd on 6 May 2012
Shannon Noll	Singer-songwriter	Elena Samodanova	Withdrew on 13 May 2012
Kerri-Anne Kennerley	Television presenter	Carmelo Pizzino	Eliminated 4th on 20 May 2012
Jessica Watson	Sailor & Order of Australia recipient	Damien Samuel	Eliminated 5th on 27 May 2012
Brian Mannix	Singer	Melanie Hooper	Eliminated 6th on 3 June 2012
Brendan Fevola	AFL player	Jessica Raffa	Eliminated 7th on 10 June 2012
Zoe Cramond	Actress	Aric Yegudkin	Third place on 17 June 2012
Danielle Spencer	Singer & actress	Damian Whitewood	Runners-up on 17 June 2012
Johnny Ruffo	The X Factor contestant	Luda Kroitor	Winners on 17 June 2012

== Scoring chart ==
The highest score each week is indicated in bold green with a dagger (†), while the lowest score each week is indicated in italicized red with a double-dagger (‡).

Color key:

Winners
Runners-up
Third place
Bottom two
Eliminated

Dancing with the Stars (season 12) - Weekly scores
Couple	Pl.	Week										
Couple	Pl.	1	2	1+2	3	4	5	6	7	8	9	10
Johnny & Luda	1st	20	22	42	22	**27**†	25	26+10=36	21+28=49	26+25=51	25+22=47	29+26+30=**85**† (Note: This couple finished in first place.)
Danielle & Damian	2nd	25	25	**50**†	**27**†	26	**28**†	30+8=**38**†	28+27=55	28+28=**56**† (Note: This couple was in the bottom two, but was not eliminated.)	27+29=**56**†	28+27+29=84 (Note: This couple finished in second place.)
Zoe & Aric	3rd	**27**†	23	**50**†	25	**27**†	**28**†	27+9=36	30+27=**57**†	29+27=**56**†	26+30=**56**†	24+27=51 (Note: This couple finished in third place.)
Brendan & Jessica	4th	20	23	43	20	20	23	14+7=21	18+28=46	24+22=46	15+27=42‡ (Note: This couple was eliminated.)	
Brian & Melanie	5th	16	20	36	21	22	16‡	16+6=22	21+28=49	19+13=32‡		
Jessica & Damien	6th	18	8‡	26‡	21	21	21	15+4=19‡	13+27=40‡			
Kerri-Anne & Carmelo	7th	22	**27**†	49	22	18	19	22+5=27				
Shannon & Elena	8th	16	16	32	15‡	20						
Vogue & Christopher	9th	14‡	20	34	21	16‡						
Caine & Jess	10th	21	17	38	20							
Erin & Gleb	11th	16	21	37								

== Weekly scores ==
Unless indicated otherwise, individual judges scores in the chart below (given in parentheses) are listed in this order from left to right: Todd McKenney, Helen Richey, Joshua Horner.

=== Week 1 ===
Couples performed either the cha-cha-cha or the Viennese waltz, and are listed in the order they performed.

Couple	Scores	Dance	Music
Johnny & Luda	20 (7, 7, 6)	Cha-cha-cha	"Troublemaker" — Taio Cruz
Erin & Gleb	16 (5, 6, 5)	Cha-cha-cha	"We Found Love" — Rihanna, feat. Calvin Harris
Caine & Jess	21 (7, 7, 7)	Viennese waltz	"You and Me" — Lifehouse
Brian & Melanie	16 (5, 5, 6)	Cha-cha-cha	"Moves Like Jagger" — Maroon 5, feat. Christina Aguilera
Danielle & Damian	25 (8, 9, 8)	Viennese waltz	"One and Only" — Adele
Shannon & Elena	16 (5, 6, 5)	Cha-cha-cha	"Start Me Up" — The Rolling Stones
Jessica & Damien	18 (6, 6, 6)	Viennese waltz	"I'm With You" — Avril Lavigne
Vogue & Christopher	14 (4, 5, 5)	Cha-cha-cha	"Dedication to My Ex (Miss That)" — Lloyd, feat. Lil Wayne
Zoe & Aric	27 (9, 9, 9)	Viennese waltz	"A Thousand Years" — Christina Perri
Brendan & Jessica	20 (7, 6, 7)	Viennese waltz	"Somebody to Love" — Queen
Kerri Anne & Carmelo	22 (8, 7, 7)	Cha-cha-cha	"I Will Survive" — Gloria Gaynor

=== Week 2 ===
Couples performed either the foxtrot or the jive, and are listed in the order they performed.

Couple	Scores	Dance	Music	Result
Shannon & Elena	16 (5, 6, 5)	Jive	"River Deep - Mountain High" — Ike & Tina Turner	Safe
Vogue & Christopher	20 (6, 7, 7)	Foxtrot	"Someone like You" — Adele	Bottom two
Caine & Jess	17 (5, 6, 6)	Jive	"Check Yes Juliet" — We The Kings	Safe
Brian & Melanie	20 (6, 7, 7)	Foxtrot	"Have You Met Miss Jones?" — Frank Sinatra	Safe
Zoe & Aric	23 (7, 8, 8)	Jive	"Runaway Baby" — Bruno Mars	Safe
Jessica & Damien	8 (1, 3, 4)	Jive	"Tightrope" — Janelle Monáe	Safe
Erin & Gleb	21 (7, 7, 7)	Foxtrot	"Fever" — Peggy Lee	Eliminated
Danielle & Damian	25 (8, 9, 8)	Jive	"Upside Down" — Paloma Faith	Safe
Brendan & Jessica	23 (9, 6, 8)	Jive	"Lonely Boy" — The Black Keys	Safe
Kerri-Anne & Carmelo	27 (9, 9, 9)	Foxtrot	"The Lady is a Tramp" — Frank Sinatra	Safe
Johnny & Luda	22 (8, 7, 7)	Foxtrot	"Apologize" — OneRepublic	Safe

=== Week 3: Personal Song/Story Week ===
Couples are listed in the order they performed.

Couple	Scores	Dance	Music	Result
Brian & Melanie	21 (7, 7, 7)	Jive	"Blue Suede Shoes" — Elvis Presley	Safe
Vogue & Christopher	21 (7, 7, 7)	Viennese waltz	"3 Words" — Cheryl Cole	Bottom two
Caine & Jess	20 (6, 7, 7)	Tango	"Somebody Told Me" — The Killers	Eliminated
Zoe & Aric	25 (9, 8, 8)	Foxtrot	"Big Jet Plane" — Angus & Julia Stone	Safe
Johnny & Luda	22 (7, 7, 8)	Rumba	"Man in the Mirror" — Michael Jackson	Safe
Danielle & Damian	27 (9, 9, 9)	Samba	"Alejandro" — Lady Gaga	Safe
Shannon & Elena	15 (5, 5, 5)	Foxtrot	"True Blue" — John Williamson	Safe
Jessica & Damien	21 (5, 8, 8)	Rumba	"Wonderwall" — Oasis	Safe
Brendan & Jessica	20 (6, 7, 7)	Cha-cha-cha	"Hey Baby" — DJ Ötzi	Safe
Kerri-Anne & Carmelo	22 (8, 8, 6)	Rumba	"You Needed Me" — Anne Murray	Safe

=== Week 4: Australian Music Week ===
Couples are listed in the order they performed.

Couple	Scores	Dance	Music	Result
Zoe & Aric	27 (9, 9, 9)	Cha-cha-cha	"Better the Devil You Know" — Kylie Minogue	Safe
Brian & Melanie	22 (7, 7, 8)	Tango	"Horror Movie" — Skyhooks	Bottom two
Vogue & Christopher	16 (5, 5, 6)	Paso doble	"Sweet Disposition" — The Temper Trap	Eliminated
Johnny & Luda	27 (10, 8, 9)	Samba	"Hello" — Cat Empire	Safe
Jessica & Damien	21 (7, 7, 7)	Tango	"Suicide Blonde" — INXS	Safe
Danielle & Damian	26 (8, 9, 9)	Foxtrot	"Somebody That I Used to Know" — Gotye, feat. Kimbra	Safe
Brendan & Jessica	20 (6, 7, 7)	Tango	"Playing to Win" — Little River Band	Safe
Kerri-Anne & Carmelo	18 (6, 6, 6)	Jive	"Like Wow - Wipeout" — Hoodoo Gurus	Safe
Shannon & Elena	20 (6, 7, 7)	Paso doble	"Dirty Deeds Done Dirt Cheap" — AC/DC	Safe

=== Week 5: Broadway Week ===
Couples are listed in the order they performed.

Couple	Scores	Dance	Music	Musical
Danielle & Damian	28 (9, 10, 9)	Tango	"Cell Block Tango"	Chicago
Brian & Melanie	16 (4, 6, 6)	Rumba	"Wanted Dead or Alive"	Rock of Ages
Zoe & Aric	28 (9, 10, 9)	Paso doble	"Be Italian"	Nine
Kerri-Anne & Carmelo	19 (6, 6, 7)	Samba	"Money, Money"	Cabaret
Jessica & Damien	21 (8, 7, 6)	Waltz	"Edelweiss"	The Sound of Music
Brendan & Jessica	23 (7, 7, 9)	Quickstep	"I Got Rhythm"	Girl Crazy
Johnny & Luda	25 (9, 8, 8)	Quickstep	"We Go Together"	Grease

=== Week 6: Movie Week ===
Couples are listed in the order they performed.

Couple	Scores	Dance	Music	Film	Result
Jessica & Damien	15 (5, 5, 5)	Cha-cha-cha	"Oh, Pretty Woman"	Pretty Woman	Bottom two
Brendan & Jessica	14 (4, 5, 5)	Rumba	"Tiny Dancer"	Almost Famous	Safe
Zoe & Aric	27 (9, 9, 9)	Salsa	"Jai Ho"	Slumdog Millionaire	Safe
Kerri-Anne & Carmelo	22 (7, 8, 7)	Waltz	"Moon River"	Breakfast at Tiffany's	Eliminated
Brian & Melanie	16 (3, 6, 7)	Paso doble	"Live and Let Die"	James Bond	Safe
Danielle & Damian	30 (10, 10, 10)	Cha-cha-cha	"When Doves Cry"	Purple Rain	Safe
Johnny & Luda	26 (8, 8, 10)	Salsa	"(I've Had) The Time of My Life"	Dirty Dancing	Safe
Jessica & Damien	4	Jive; Marathon	"You Never Can Tell" — from Pulp Fiction		
Kerri Anne & Carmelo	5	Jive; Marathon	"You Never Can Tell" — from Pulp Fiction		
Brian & Melanie	6	Jive; Marathon	"You Never Can Tell" — from Pulp Fiction		
Brendan & Jessica	7	Jive; Marathon	"You Never Can Tell" — from Pulp Fiction		
Danielle & Damian	8	Jive; Marathon	"You Never Can Tell" — from Pulp Fiction		
Zoe & Aric	9	Jive; Marathon	"You Never Can Tell" — from Pulp Fiction		
Johnny & Luda	10	Jive; Marathon	"You Never Can Tell" — from Pulp Fiction		

=== Week 7: Team Dances Week ===
Couples are listed in the order they performed.

Couple	Scores	Dance	Music	Result
Danielle & Damian	28 (9, 10, 9)	Paso doble	"What You Want" — Evanescence	Safe
Brian & Melanie	21 (6, 7, 8)	Viennese waltz	"You've Got to Hide Your Love Away" — The Beatles	Safe
Zoe & Aric	30 (10, 10, 10)	Quickstep	"Let the Good Times Roll" — Louis Jordan	Safe
Brendan & Jessica	18 (5, 6, 7)	Samba	"Mama Do the Hump" — Rizzle Kicks	Bottom two
Jessica & Damien	13 (4, 4, 5)	Salsa	"Ain't Nobody" — Chaka Khan	Eliminated
Johnny & Luda	21 (7, 7, 7)	Viennese waltz	"I Won't Give Up" — Jason Mraz	Safe
Brendan & Jessica Brian & Melanie Johnny & Luda	28 (9, 9, 10)	Team; Cha-cha-cha	"I Like How It Feels" — Enrique Iglesias	
Danielle & Damian Jessica & Damien Zoe & Aric	27 (9, 9, 9)	Team; Cha-cha-cha	"Dance Again" — Jennifer Lopez	

=== Week 8: Instant Dances Week ===
Couples are listed in the order they performed.

Couple	Scores	Dance	Music	Result
Johnny & Luda	26 (9, 8, 9)	Tango	"Smooth Criminal" — Michael Jackson	Safe
Johnny & Luda	25 (8, 8, 9)	Paso doble	"Seven Nation Army" — The White Stripes	Safe
Brian & Melanie	19 (5, 7, 7)	Quickstep	"Sir Duke" — Stevie Wonder	Eliminated
Brian & Melanie	13 (2, 5, 6)	Samba	"Jump in the Line" — Harry Belafonte	Eliminated
Zoe & Aric	29 (9, 10, 10)	Tango	"Rumor Has It" — Adele	Safe
Zoe & Aric	27 (9, 9, 9)	Samba	"Pon de Replay" — Rihanna	Safe
Danielle & Damian	28 (8, 10, 10)	Quickstep	"Sparkling Diamonds" — Nicole Kidman	Bottom two
Danielle & Damian	28 (10, 9, 9)	Rumba	"Drops of Jupiter" — Train	Bottom two
Brendan & Jessica	24 (8, 8, 8)	Foxtrot	"It Had to Be You" — Frank Sinatra	Safe
Brendan & Jessica	22 (7, 7, 8)	Paso doble	"Paint it Black" — The Rolling Stones	Safe

=== Week 9: Semifinals Week ===
Each couple performed two unlearned dances, one of which was the Argentine tango. Couples are listed in the order they performed.

Couple	Scores	Dance	Music	Result
Johnny & Luda	25 (8, 8, 9)	Jive	"Jet Lag" — Simple Plan	Safe
Johnny & Luda	22 (7, 8, 7)	Argentine tango	"Sin Rumbo" — Otros Aires	Safe
Zoe & Aric	26 (9, 9, 8)	Argentine tango	"Tanguera" — Mariano Mores	Safe
Zoe & Aric	30 (10, 10, 10)	Rumba	"Love the Way You Lie (Part II)" — Eminem, feat. Rihanna	Safe
Brendan & Jessica	15 (5, 5, 5)	Salsa	"Get Busy" — Sean Paul	Eliminated
Brendan & Jessica	27 (9, 9, 9)	Argentine tango	"Libertango" — Bond	Eliminated
Danielle & Damian	27 (9, 9, 9)	Argentine tango		Safe
Danielle & Damian	29 (10, 10, 9)	Salsa	"Danza Kuduro (Throw Your Hands Up)" — Qwote & Lucenzo	Safe

=== Week 10: Grand Finale ===
Couples are listed in the order they performed.

Couple	Order	Scores	Dance	Music	Result
Danielle & Damian	1	28 (9, 10, 9)	Jive	"Everybody Needs Somebody to Love" — Solomon Burke	Runners-up
Danielle & Damian	5	29 (9, 10, 10)	Freestyle	"When Love Takes Over" — David Guetta & Kelly Rowland	Runners-up
Johnny & Luda	2	29 (10, 9, 10)	Foxtrot	"This Business of Love" — Domino	Winners
Johnny & Luda	6	30 (10, 10, 10)	Freestyle	"It's Tricky" — Run-D.M.C.	Winners
Zoe & Aric	3	24 (8, 8, 8)	Jive	"Like It Like That" — Guy Sebastian	Third place
Danielle & Damian	4	27 (9, 9, 9)	Group; Cha-cha-cha	"Tonight Is the Night" — Outasight	
Johnny & Luda	4	26 (8, 9, 9)	Group; Cha-cha-cha	"Tonight Is the Night" — Outasight	
Zoe & Aric	4	27 (9, 9, 9)	Group; Cha-cha-cha	"Tonight Is the Night" — Outasight	

== Dance chart ==
- Week 1: Cha-cha-cha or Viennese waltz
- Week 2: Foxtrot or jive
- Week 3: One unlearned dance (Personal Song/Story week)
- Week 4: One unlearned dance (Australian Music week)
- Week 5: One unlearned dance (Broadway Week)
- Week 6: One unlearned dance & jive marathon (Movies/Musicals Week)
- Week 7: One unlearned dance & team dances
- Week 8: One unlearned ballroom dance & instant Latin dance
- Week 9: One unlearned dance & Argentine tango
- Week 10: Redemption dance, group cha-cha-cha & freestyle

Dancing with the Stars (season 12) - Dance chart
Couple	Week															
Couple	1	2	3	4	5	6		7		8		9		10		
Johnny & Luda	Cha-cha-cha	Foxtrot	Rumba	Samba	Quickstep	Salsa	Jive; Marathon	Viennese waltz	Team; Cha-cha-cha	Tango	Paso doble	Jive	Argentine tango	Foxtrot	Group; Cha-cha-cha	Freestyle
Danielle & Damian	Viennese waltz	Jive	Samba	Foxtrot	Tango	Cha-cha-cha	Jive; Marathon	Paso doble	Team Cha-cha-cha	Quickstep	Rumba	Argentine tango	Salsa	Jive	Group; Cha-cha-cha	Freestyle
Zoe & Aric	Viennese waltz	Jive	Foxtrot	Cha-cha-cha	Paso doble	Salsa	Jive; Marathon	Quickstep	Team Cha-cha-cha	Tango	Samba	Argentine tango	Rumba	Jive	Group; Cha-cha-cha	
Brendan & Jessica	Viennese waltz	Jive	Cha-cha-cha	Tango	Quickstep	Rumba	Jive; Marathon	Samba	Team Cha-cha-cha	Foxtrot	Paso doble	Salsa	Argentine tango			
Brian & Melanie	Cha-cha-cha	Foxtrot	Jive	Tango	Rumba	Paso doble	Jive; Marathon	Viennese waltz	Team Cha-cha-cha	Quickstep	Samba					
Jessica & Damien	Viennese waltz	Jive	Rumba	Tango	Waltz	Cha-cha-cha	Jive; Marathon	Salsa	Team Cha-cha-cha							
Kerri-Anne & Carmelo	Cha-cha-cha	Foxtrot	Rumba	Jive	Samba	Waltz	Jive; Marathon									
Shannon & Elena	Cha-cha-cha	Jive	Foxtrot	Paso doble												
Vogue & Christopher	Cha-cha-cha	Foxtrot	Viennese waltz	Paso doble												
Caine & Jess	Viennese waltz	Jive	Tango													
Erin & Gleb	Cha-cha-cha	Foxtrot														

Preceded by Dancing with the Stars (Australian season 11)	Dancing with the Stars (Australian version); Season 12	Succeeded by Dancing with the Stars (Australian season 13)
