= Dancing with the Stars (Australian TV series) season 13 =

Dancing with the Stars
- Season 13
- Presented by: Daniel MacPherson; Edwina Bartholomew
- Judges: Adam Garcia; Kym Johnson; Todd McKenney; Helen Richey
- Celebrity winner: Cosentino
- Professional winner: Jessica Raffa
- No. of episodes: 11

Release
- Original network: Seven Network
- Original release: 1 October – 26 November 2013

Season chronology
- ← Previous; Season 12 Next → Season 14

The thirteenth season of Dancing with the Stars Australia premiered live on 1 October 2013. Daniel MacPherson continued his role as main host of the show on Channel Seven. However, Melanie Brown had announced she wouldn't be returning for her second season as co-host, in order to pursue a judging role on America's Got Talent. Sunrise weather presenter, Edwina Bartholomew permanently replaced Brown for this season.

Todd McKenney and Helen Richey confirmed their returns as judges whilst, Joshua Horner resigned from the panel after two seasons. It was later revealed that two new judges will both replace Horner. Former champion and current Dancing with the Stars USA professional, Kym Johnson and actor/tap dancer Adam Garcia became the newest additions to the judges table, alongside McKenney and Richey.

This season featured twelve celebrity contestants. The celebrities were revealed on 27 August 2013, via the network's website, along with their professional partners on Today Tonight.

On 26 November 2013, Cosentino and professional partner, Jessica Raffa were announced as the winners, while Rhiannon Fish and Tina Arena finished in second and third place respectively.

== Couples ==
Celebrity	Notability	Professional partner	Status
Jordan Stenmark	Model	Jessica Prince	Eliminated 1st on 8 October 2013
Tony Barber	Television presenter	Melanie Hooper	Eliminated 2nd on 15 October 2013
Sally Obermeder	Television presenter	Carmelo Pizzino	Eliminated 3rd on 22 October 2013
Sophia Pou	My Kitchen Rules contestant	Michael Miziner	Eliminated 4th on 29 October 2013
Brendan Jones	Radio personality	Alana Patience	Eliminated 5th on 3 November 2013
Jesinta Campbell	Miss Universe Australia 2010	Jarryd Byrne	Eliminated 6th on 5 November 2013
Zac Stenmark	Model	Jade Hatcher; Sriani Argaet (Week 8)	Eliminated 7th on 10 November 2013
Steve Hooker	Olympic pole vaulter	Ash-Leigh Hunter	Eliminated 8th on 12 November 2013
Libby Trickett	Olympic swimmer	Carmelo Pizzino; Dannial Gosper (Weeks 1–4)	Eliminated 9th on 19 November 2013
Tina Arena	Singer	Damian Whitewood	Third place on 26 November 2013
Rhiannon Fish	Home and Away actress	Aric Yegudkin	Runners-up on 26 November 2013
Cosentino	Illusionist	Jessica Raffa; Sriani Argaet (Weeks 2–4)	Winners on 26 November 2013

== Scoring chart ==
The highest score each week is indicated in bold green with a dagger (†), while the lowest score each week is indicated in italicized red with a double-dagger (‡).

Color key:

Winners
Runners-up
Third place
Bottom two
Eliminated

Dancing with the Stars (season 13) - Weekly scores
Couple	Pl.	Week											
Couple	Pl.	1	2	1+2	3	4	5	6	7	8	9	10	11
Cosentino & Jessica R.	1st	**37**†	31	**68**†	31	35	34	**36**†	32+6=38	29+32=61	35+32=67	34+40=74	34+31+39=**104**† (Note: This couple finished in first place.)
Rhiannon & Aric	2nd	32	**34**†	66	**40**†	**36**†	**38**†	34	37+9=46	29+34=63	36+40=76	33+36=69 (Note: This couple was in the bottom two, but was not eliminated.)	35+32+36=103 (Note: This couple finished in second place.)
Tina & Damian	3rd	35	30	65	35	31	36	35	38+10=**48**†	36+32=68	40+38=**78**†	38+40=**78**†	38+36=74 (Note: This couple finished in third place.)
Libby & Carmelo	4th	28	29	57	29	27	36	32	28+7=35	28+32=60	24+28=52‡	31+37=68‡ (Note: This couple was eliminated.)	
Steve & Ash-Leigh	5th	27	**34**†	61	33	31	27	27	26+8=34	36+34=**70**†	29+31=60		
Zac & Jade	6th	30	28	58	28	30	31	27	27+4=31‡	25+34=59‡			
Jesinta & Jarryd	7th	24	24	48	26	31	28	34	26+5=31‡				
Brendan & Alana	8th	22	15‡	37‡	19‡	19‡	25‡	24‡					
Sophia & Michael	9th	28	30	58	29	28	26						
Sally & Carmelo	10th	17‡	20	37‡	22	19‡							
Tony & Melanie	11th	24	26	50	28								
Jordan & Jessica P.	12th	25	27	52									

== Weekly scores ==
Individual judges scores in the charts below (given in parentheses) are listed in this order from left to right: Todd McKenney, Kym Johnson, Helen Richey, Adam Garcia.

=== Week 1 ===
Couples performed either the cha-cha-cha, contemporary, or the foxtrot. Couples are listed in the order they performed.

Couple	Scores	Dance	Music
Jesinta & Jarryd	24 (6, 6, 6, 6)	Cha-cha-cha	"What You've Done To Me" — Samantha Jade
Steve & Ash-Leigh	27 (7, 6, 7, 7)	Foxtrot	"Beautiful" — Mariah Carey
Libby & Dannial	28 (7, 7, 7, 7)	Cha-cha-cha	"Domino" — Jessie J
Cosentino & Jessica	37 (9, 9, 10, 9)	Contemporary	"When I Was Your Man" — Bruno Mars
Sally & Carmelo	17 (2, 5, 5, 5)	Foxtrot	"Girl on Fire" — Alicia Keys
Jordan & Jessica	25 (6, 6, 7, 6)	Cha-cha-cha	"Blurred Lines" — Robin Thicke, feat. T.I. & Pharrell Williams
Zac & Jade	30 (7, 7, 8, 8)	Foxtrot	"I Won't Let You Go" — James Morrison
Sophia & Michael	28 (7, 7, 7, 7)	Cha-cha-cha	"I Love It" — Icona Pop, feat. Charli XCX
Brendan & Alana	22 (5, 6, 6, 5)	Cha-cha-cha	"Come Dance With Me" — Frank Sinatra
Rhiannon & Aric	32 (7, 8, 9, 8)	Contemporary	"Titanium" — David Guetta, feat. Sia
Tony & Melanie	24 (6, 6, 6, 6)	Foxtrot	"The Best Is Yet To Come" — Michael Bublé
Tina & Damian	35 (9, 9, 9, 8)	Contemporary	"Beneath Your Beautiful" — Labrinth, feat. Emeli Sandé

=== Week 2 ===
Jessica Raffa injured her back and was replaced by her friend, Sriani Argaet.

Couples performed either jazz, the jive, or the Viennese waltz. Couples are listed in the order they performed.

Couple	Scores	Dance	Music	Result
Libby & Dannial	29 (8, 7, 7, 7)	Jive	"Gotcha" — Jessica Mauboy	Bottom two
Tony & Melanie	26 (6, 6, 7, 7)	Jazz	"Mack The Knife" — Rosemary Clooney	Safe
Zac & Jade	28 (7, 7, 7, 7)	Jive	"Everybody Talks" — Neon Trees	Safe
Jordan & Jessica	27 (5, 7, 7, 8)	Viennese waltz	"Give Me Love" — Ed Sheeran	Eliminated
Jesinta & Jarryd	24 (6, 6, 6, 6)	Jive	"SOS" — Rihanna	Safe
Sally & Carmelo	20 (4, 5, 6, 5)	Jazz	"Roar" — Katy Perry	Safe
Steve & Ash-Leigh	34 (8, 9, 8, 9)	Jazz	"The Lipstick on His Collar" — Caro Emerald	Safe
Sophia & Michael	30 (7, 8, 7, 8)	Viennese waltz	"Everyone's Waiting" — Missy Higgins	Safe
Brendan & Alana	15 (2, 4, 4, 5)	Jive	"She's a Genius" — Jet	Safe
Tina & Damian	30 (7, 8, 8, 7)	Viennese waltz	"At Last" — Etta James	Safe
Rhiannon & Aric	34 (8, 9, 9, 8)	Jazz	"Everybody" — Martin Solveig	Safe
Cosentino & Sriani	31 (7, 8, 8, 8)	Viennese waltz	"If I Ain't Got You" — Alicia Keys	Safe

=== Week 3 ===
Couples are listed in the order they performed.

Couple	Scores	Dance	Music	Result
Zac & Jade	28 (7, 7, 7, 7)	Paso doble	"Highway to Hell" — AC/DC	Safe
Sally & Carmelo	22 (4, 6, 6, 6)	Tango	"Stronger (What Doesn't Kill You)" — Kelly Clarkson	Safe
Libby & Dannial	29 (7, 7, 8, 7)	Viennese waltz	"Never Tear Us Apart" — INXS	Safe
Jesinta & Jarryd	26 (6, 7, 6, 7)	Samba	"Dancing Queen" — ABBA	Bottom two
Tony & Melanie	28 (6, 7, 7, 8)	Waltz	"True Love" — High Society	Eliminated
Brendan & Alana	19 (3, 5, 5, 6)	Foxtrot	"When You Walk in the Room" — Jackie DeShannon	Safe
Sophia & Michael	29 (8, 7, 7, 7)	Contemporary	"Firework" — Katy Perry	Safe
Steve & Ash-Leigh	33 (9, 8, 8, 8)	Quickstep	"Lisztomania" — Phoenix	Safe
Cosentino & Sriani	31 (7, 8, 8, 8)	Cha-cha-cha	"Working Day and Night" — Michael Jackson	Safe
Rhiannon & Aric	40 (10, 10, 10, 10)	Rumba	"Beauty and the Beast" — Celine Dion & Peabo Bryson	Safe
Tina & Damian	35 (8, 9, 9, 9)	Cha-cha-cha	"No More Tears (Enough Is Enough)" — Donna Summer & Barbra Streisand	Safe

=== Week 4 (Rock Week) ===
Couples performed either the paso doble or the tango, and are listed in the order they performed.

Couple	Scores	Dance	Music	Result
Tina & Damian	31 (7, 8, 8, 8)	Tango	"Another One Bites the Dust" — Queen	Safe
Libby & Dannial	27 (7, 7, 7, 6)	Paso doble	"Uprising" — Muse	Safe
Sally & Carmelo	19 (4, 5, 5, 5)	Paso doble	"Livin' On A Prayer" — Bon Jovi	Eliminated
Zac & Jade	30 (8, 8, 7, 7)	Tango	"Gold on the Ceiling" — The Black Keys	Safe
Sophia & Michael	28 (7, 7, 7, 7)	Paso doble	"Are You Gonna Go My Way?" — Lenny Kravitz	Bottom two
Brendan & Alana	19 (4, 5, 5, 5)	Paso doble	"I Was Made For Lovin' You" — Kiss	Safe
Jesinta & Jarryd	31 (8, 8, 7, 8)	Tango	"Spectrum" — Florence and the Machine	Safe
Cosentino & Sriani	35 (8, 9, 9, 9)	Paso doble	"Sing" — My Chemical Romance	Safe
Rhiannon & Aric	36 (9, 9, 9, 9)	Tango	"What You Waiting For?" — Gwen Stefani	Safe
Steve & Ash-Leigh	31 (7, 8, 8, 8)	Paso doble	"Song 2" — Blur	Safe

=== Week 5 (Movie Week) ===
Dannial Gosper was forced to withdraw from the competition; Carmelo Pizzino took his place.

Couples are listed in the order they performed.

Couple	Scores	Dance	Music	Film	Result
Steve & Ashleigh	27 (6, 7, 7, 7)	Jive	"Old Time Rock and Roll" — Bob Seger	Risky Business	Safe
Jesinta & Jarryd	28 (8, 7, 6, 7)	Foxtrot	"Cups" — Anna Kendrick	Pitch Perfect	Safe
Zac & Jade	31 (8, 8, 8, 7)	Quickstep	"Spider-Man Theme Song" — Michael Bublé	Spider-Man 2	Safe
Libby & Carmelo*	36 (9, 9, 9, 9)	Foxtrot	"Somewhere Over The Rainbow" — E.Y. Harburg	The Wizard of Oz	Safe
Sophia & Michael	26 (6, 7, 7, 6)	Samba	"Independent Women Part I" — Destiny's Child	Charlie's Angels	Eliminated
Tina & Damian	36 (9, 9, 9, 9)	Rumba	"I Dreamed a Dream" — Anne Hathaway	Les Misérables	Safe
Brendan & Alana	25 (5, 6, 7, 7)	Tango	"Neutron Star Collision (Love Is Forever)" — Muse	Twilight Saga: Eclipse	Bottom two
Rhiannon & Aric	38 (9, 9, 10, 10)	Cha-cha-cha	"A Little Party Never Killed Nobody (All We Got)" — Fergie, Q-Tip & GoonRock	The Great Gatsby	Safe
Cosentino & Jessica	34 (8, 9, 8, 9)	Rumba	"Skyfall" — Adele	Skyfall	Safe

=== Week 6 ===
Couples are listed in the order they performed.

Couple	Scores	Dance	Music	Result
Libby & Carmelo	32 (8, 8, 8, 8)	Jazz	"Man Like That" — Gin Wigmore	Safe
Jesinta & Jarryd	34 (8, 9, 8, 9)	Contemporary	"Resolution" — Matt Corby	Safe
Steve & Ash-Leigh	31 (7, 8, 8, 8)	Samba	"On Top of The World" — Imagine Dragons	Bottom two
Zac & Jade	27 (7, 7, 7, 6)	Jazz	"Señorita" — Justin Timberlake	Safe
Brendan & Alana	24 (5, 7, 6, 6)	Quickstep	"Sir Duke" — Stevie Wonder	Eliminated
Tina & Damian	35 (8, 9, 9, 9)	Jazz	"Love Me Again" — John Newman	Safe
Cosentino & Jessica	36 (9, 9, 9, 9)	Tango	"Every Teardrop Is A Waterfall" — Coldplay	Safe
Rhiannon & Aric	34 (8, 8, 9, 9)	Jive	"One Way or Another (Teenage Kicks)" — One Direction	Safe

=== Week 7 ===
Each couple performed a fusion dance of two dance styles, and a dance marathon for bonus points. Couples are listed in the order they performed.

Couple	Scores	Dance	Music	Result
Steve & Ash-Leigh	26 (5, 7, 7, 7)	Cha-cha-cha & Quickstep	"Wake Me Up" — Avicii	Bottom two
Tina & Damian	38 (9, 9, 10, 10)	Foxtrot & Viennese waltz	"It's Oh So Quiet" — Björk	Safe
Jesinta & Jarryd	26 (6, 7, 6, 7)	Foxtrot & Samba	"Ain't It Fun" — Paramore	Eliminated
Zac & Jade	27 (6, 7, 7, 7)	Foxtrot & Rumba	"Hold On, We're Going Home" — Drake, feat. Majid Jordan	Safe
Cosentino & Jessica	32 (8, 8, 8, 8)	Cha-cha-cha & Tango	"Counting Stars" — OneRepublic	Safe
Rhiannon & Aric	37 (9, 9, 9, 10)	Foxtrot & Rumba	"Stay" — Rihanna, feat. Mikky Ekko	Safe
Libby & Carmelo	28 (4, 8, 8, 8)	Cha-cha-cha & Paso doble	"Poker Face" — Lady Gaga	Safe
Zac & Jade	4	Dance; Marathon		
Jesinta & Jarryd	5	Dance; Marathon		
Cosentino & Jessica	6	Dance; Marathon		
Libby & Carmelo	7	Dance; Marathon		
Steve & Ash-Leigh	8	Dance; Marathon		
Rhiannon & Aric	9	Dance; Marathon		
Tina & Damian	10	Dance; Marathon		

=== Week 8 ===
Each couple performed one unlearned dance and participated in a team dance. Couples are listed in the order they performed.

Couple	Scores	Dance	Music	Result
Libby & Carmelo	28 (6, 7, 8, 7)	Quickstep	"Crazy in Love" — Emeli Sandé & The Bryan Ferry Orchestra	Bottom two
Zac & Sriani	25 (6, 6, 6, 7)	Samba	"Troublemaker" — Olly Murs, feat. Flo Rida	Eliminated
Steve & Ash-Leigh	36 (9, 9, 9, 9)	Contemporary	"Fix You" — Coldplay	Safe
Cosentino & Jessica	29 (8, 7, 7, 7)	Samba	"Classic" — MKTO	Safe
Tina & Damian	36 (9, 9, 9, 9)	Samba	"Suit & Tie" — Justin Timberlake, feat. Jay-Z	Safe
Rhiannon & Aric	29 (6, 8, 7, 8)	Viennese waltz	"Iris" — Goo Goo Dolls	Safe
Cosentino & Jessica Libby & Carmelo Tina & Damian	32 (8, 8, 8, 8)	Team; Cha-cha-cha	"Vogue" — Madonna	
Rhiannon & Aric Steve & Ash-Leigh Zac & Sriani	34 (9, 9, 9, 7)	Team; Samba	"Single Ladies (Put a Ring on It)" — Beyoncé Knowles	

=== Week 9 ===
Each couple performed two unlearned dances, and are listed in the order they performed.

Couple	Scores	Dance	Music	Result
Tina & Damian	40 (10, 10, 10, 10)	Jive	"Land of a Thousand Dances" — Wilson Pickett	Safe
Tina & Damian	38 (10, 9, 10, 9)	Foxtrot	"Love Is the Drug" — Bryan Ferry with The Bryan Ferry Orchestra	Safe
Steve & Ash-Leigh	29 (5, 8, 8, 8)	Tango	"You're Nobody 'til Somebody Loves You" — James Arthur	Eliminated
Steve & Ash-Leigh	31 (7, 8, 8, 8)	Cha-cha-cha	"Treasure" — Bruno Mars	Eliminated
Libby & Carmelo	24 (5, 6, 6, 7)	Samba	"Quando, Quando, Quando" — Fergie, feat. will.i.am	Bottom two
Libby & Carmelo	28 (7, 7, 7, 7)	Tango	"Breakaway" – Big Pig	Bottom two
Cosentino & Jessica	35 (8, 9, 9, 9)	Foxtrot	"Ordinary People" — John Legend	Safe
Cosentino & Jessica	32 (9, 8, 8, 7)	Jazz	"Wonderful Night" — Fatboy Slim, feat. Lateef the Truth Speaker	Safe
Rhiannon & Aric	36 (9, 9, 9, 9)	Quickstep	"Big and Bad" — Big Bad Voodoo Daddy	Safe
Rhiannon & Aric	40 (10, 10, 10, 10)	Samba	"Wings" — Little Mix	Safe

=== Week 10 ===
Each couple performed two unlearned dances, and are listed in the order they performed.

Couple	Scores	Dance	Music	Result
Tina & Damian	38 (9, 10, 9, 10)	Charleston	"Bang Bang" — will.i.am	Safe
Tina & Damian	40 (10, 10, 10, 10)	Paso doble	"Thunder" — Nuttin' But Stringz	Safe
Rhiannon & Aric	33 (7, 9, 8, 9)	Hip-hop	"Dangerous" — Michael Jackson	Bottom two
Rhiannon & Aric	36 (9, 9, 9, 9)	Argentine tango	"Epoca" — Gotan Project	Bottom two
Cosentino & Jessica	34 (8, 9, 9, 8)	Disco	"Get Down Tonight" — KC and the Sunshine Band	Safe
Cosentino & Jessica	40 (10, 10, 10, 10)	Argentine tango	"Assassin's Tango" — from Mr. & Mrs. Smith	Safe
Libby & Carmelo	31 (7, 8, 8, 8)	Lindy Hop	"Ding Dong Daddy of the D-Car Line" — Cherry Poppin' Daddies	Eliminated
Libby & Carmelo	37 (9, 9, 9, 10)	Rumba	"Try" — Pink	Eliminated

=== Week 11 ===
Couples are listed in the order they performed.

Couple	Order	Scores	Dance	Music	Result
Cosentino & Jessica	1	34 (9, 9, 8, 8)	Samba	"Mas Que Nada" — Sérgio Mendes, feat. The Black Eyed Peas	Winners
Cosentino & Jessica	5	39 (9, 10, 10, 10)	Freestyle	"Kissing You" — Des'ree	Winners
Rhiannon & Aric	2	35 (8, 9, 9, 9)	Viennese waltz	"Breakaway" — Kelly Clarkson	Runners-up
Rhiannon & Aric	6	36 (9, 9, 9, 9)	Freestyle	"You Can't Stop the Beat" — from Hairspray	Runners-up
Tina & Damian	3	38 (9, 10, 10, 9)	Tango	"Applause" — Lady Gaga	Third place
Cosentino & Jessica	4	31 (7, 8, 8, 8)	Group; Cha-cha-cha	"Feel This Moment" — Pitbull, feat. Christina Aguilera	
Rhiannon & Aric	4	32 (8, 8, 8, 8)	Group; Cha-cha-cha	"Feel This Moment" — Pitbull, feat. Christina Aguilera	
Tina & Damian	4	36 (9, 9, 9, 9)	Group; Cha-cha-cha	"Feel This Moment" — Pitbull, feat. Christina Aguilera	

== Dance chart ==
- Week 1: Cha-cha-cha, contemporary, or foxtrot
- Week 2: Jazz, jive, or Viennese waltz
- Week 3: One unlearned dance
- Week 4: Paso doble or tango
- Weeks 5–6: One unlearned dance
- Week 7: Fusion dance & dance marathon
- Week 8: One unlearned dance & team dance
- Weeks 9–10: Two unlearned dances
- Week 11: Redemption dance, group cha-cha-cha & freestyle

Dancing with the Stars (season 13) - Dance chart
Couple	Week																
Couple	1	2	3	4	5	6	7		8		9		10		11		
Cosentino & Jessica	Contemp.	Viennese waltz	Cha-cha-cha	Paso doble	Rumba	Tango	Cha-cha-cha & Tango	Marathon	Samba	Team; Cha-cha-cha	Foxtrot	Jazz	Disco	Argentine tango	Samba	Group; Cha-cha-cha	Freestyle
Rhiannon & Aric	Contemp.	Jazz	Rumba	Tango	Cha-cha-cha	Jive	Foxtrot & Rumba	Marathon	Viennese waltz	Team; Samba	Quickstep	Samba	Hip-hop	Argentine tango	Viennese waltz	Group; Cha-cha-cha	Freestyle
Tina & Damian	Contemp.	Viennese waltz	Cha-cha-cha	Tango	Rumba	Jazz	Foxtrot & Viennese waltz	Marathon	Samba	Team; Cha-cha-cha	Jive	Foxtrot	Charleston	Paso doble	Tango	Group; Cha-cha-cha	
Libby & Carmelo	Cha-cha-cha	Jive	Viennese waltz	Paso doble	Foxtrot	Jazz	Cha-cha-cha & Paso doble	Marathon	Quickstep	Team; Cha-cha-cha	Samba	Tango	Lindy Hop	Rumba			
Steve & Ash-Leigh	Foxtrot	Jazz	Quickstep	Paso doble	Jive	Samba	Cha-cha-cha & Quickstep	Marathon	Contemp.	Team; Samba	Tango	Cha-cha-cha					
Zac & Jade	Foxtrot	Jive	Paso doble	Tango	Quickstep	Jazz	Foxtrot & Rumba	Marathon	Samba	Team Samba							
Jesinta & Jarryd	Cha-cha-cha	Jive	Samba	Tango	Foxtrot	Contemp.	Foxtrot & Samba	Marathon									
Brendan & Alana	Cha-cha-cha	Jive	Foxtrot	Paso doble	Tango	Quickstep											
Sophia & Michael	Cha-cha-cha	Viennese waltz	Contemp.	Paso doble	Samba												
Sally & Carmelo	Foxtrot	Jazz	Tango	Paso doble													
Tony & Melanie	Foxtrot	Jazz	Waltz														
Jordan & Jessica	Cha-cha-cha	Viennese waltz															

== Reception ==
=== Viewership ===
Episode		Original airdate	Viewers (in millions)	Rank (Night)	Source
1	"Week One"	1 October 2013	1.331	#1	
2	"Week Two"	8 October 2013	1.240	#1	
3	"Week Three"	15 October 2013	1.133	#2	
4	"Week Four"	22 October 2013	1.137	#2	
5	"Week Five"	29 October 2013	1.165	#2	
6	"Week Six"	3 November 2013	1.042	#3	
7	"Week Seven"	5 November 2013	1.134	#5	
8	"Week Eight"	10 November 2013	1.075	#6	
9	"Week Nine"	12 November 2013	1.204	#1	
10	"Week Ten"	19 November 2013	1.222	#1	
11	"Week Eleven"	26 November 2013	1.384	#1	
