= Danielle Spencer (Australian actress) =

Australian actress and singer-songwriter, (born 1969)

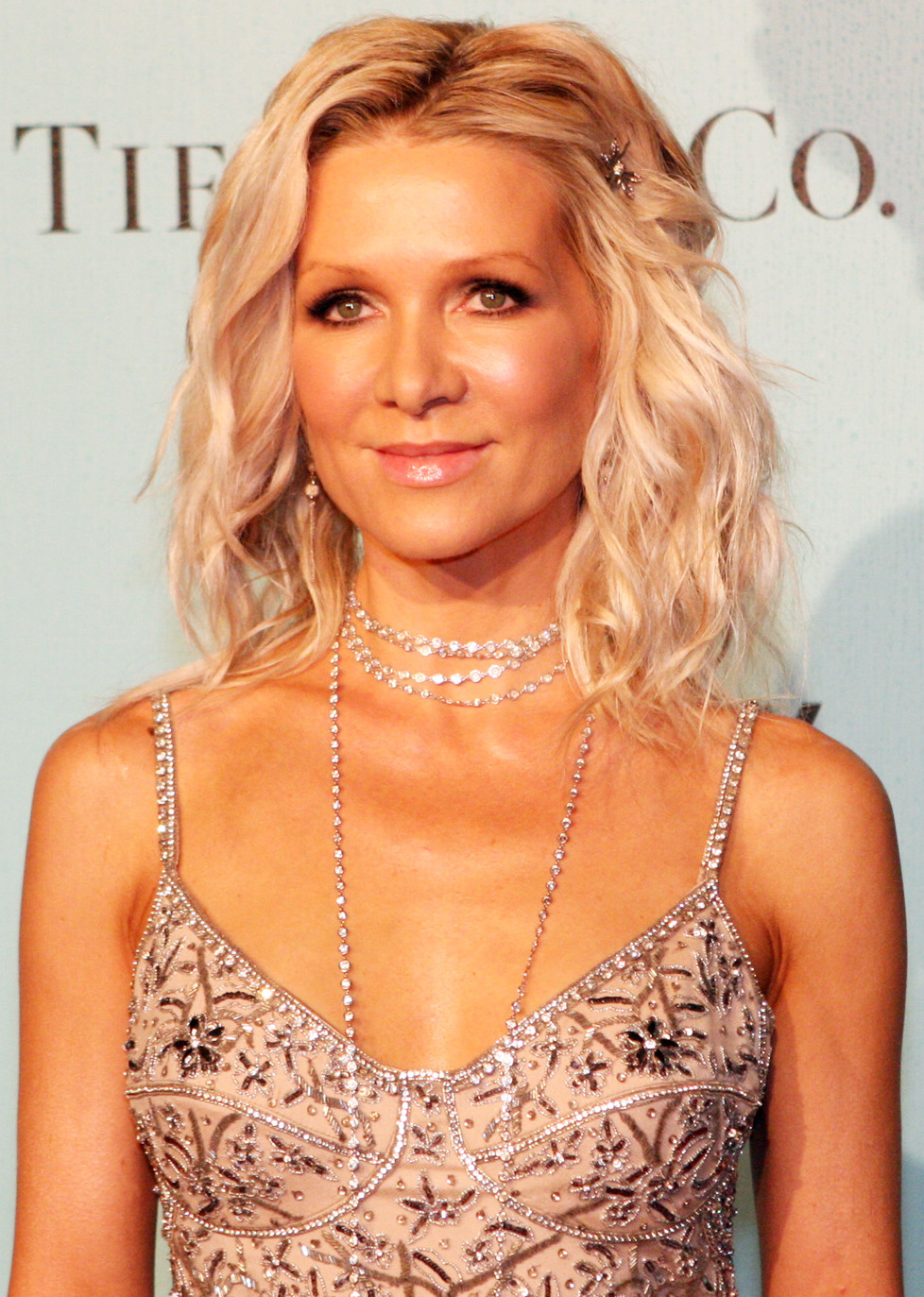
- Spencer in 2013
- Born: 16 May 1969 (age 57); Sydney, New South Wales, Australia
- Occupations: Singer; actress; songwriter
- Years active: 1989–present
- Spouse: Russell Crowe (m. 2003; div. 2018)
- Partner: Adam Long (2016–present)
- Children: 2
- Father: Don Spencer
- Musical career
- Genre: Pop
- Instrument: Vocals
- Labels: EMI; Danielle Spencer Music

Danielle Spencer (born 16 May 1969) is an Australian actress, singer, and songwriter. In 2026 her album Regenerate peaked at number 70 Australian Albums Chart.

== Early life ==
Spencer is the daughter of Australian songwriter, singer and television entertainer Don Spencer and wife Julie (née Horsfall), a caterer from Yorkshire. She has an older brother, Dean. At age four, she began piano lessons. During her teens she began acting and composing her own tunes. Until the age of twelve, she spent her childhood and youth alternately in Australia and in Yorkshire and Cambridgeshire, England, as her father worked in both countries for the BBC Play School.

== Career ==
Spencer grew up in close contact with the world of showbusiness. Occasionally she accompanied her father on his performances on stage. She took singing and acting lessons and dance classes in classical ballet and modern dance and jazz. In 1987 Danielle Spencer starred in Rasputin as one of the Tsar's daughters and dated Terry Serio who also starred in the same musical as Prince Felix.

From 1989 to 2000, she worked as an actress, especially for Australian television, primarily as an actress in TV series. Subsequently, the focus of her artistic activity shifted to the area of singer / songwriter.

In 2001, she released her debut musical album, White Monkey. After a family break, in February 2010 she released her second album, Calling All Magicians. Under the direction of her husband, the music videos were made to the title songs and "Tickle Me" and "Wish I'd Been Here".

In August 2011, Spencer for the first time gave two live concerts alongside her husband. The pair joined the musicians and actors Alan Doyle, Kevin Durand, Scott Grimes and the group Size2Shoes to present the Crowe / Doyle Songbook Vol III at St John's, Newfoundland, Canada. Songs from this album relate, among others, to the novel Dirt Music by the Australian novelist Tim Winton. Spencer gives live concerts on a regular basis. For her live concert tour in October 2011, titled "Alone and Together", she joined Australian bass player Steve Balbi.

In March 2012, Spencer was announced as a contestant for season 12 of Dancing with the Stars on the Seven Network in which she placed second. Her professional partner was Damian Whitewood.

In 2015, Danielle Spencer was a member of Australia's judging panel in the 2015 Eurovision Song Contest.

Spencer is a supporter of her father Don Spencer's charity, the Australian Children's Music Foundation (ACMF), an educational program for underprivileged and Indigenous children in Australia. She's supporter of women's cancer programs as the Pink Ribbon Breakfast for breast cancer and The Girls Night.

On 10 July 2020, Spencer released a self-titled album with producer/songwriter Vince Pizzinga, under duo-name Lost Luggage. The album consisted of alternative covers of 1980's songs. She promoted the release on various platforms, including on Channel 7, and The Kyle and Jackie O Show on KIIS 106.5.

=== Regenerate (2024–2026) ===
In November 2024, Spencer released her first new original song in 14 years, titled "Regenerate". On 27 March 2026, she released her third solo studio album, Regenerate, her first in 16 years following 2010's Calling All Magicians.

The album debuted at number 8 on the ARIA Australian Artist Albums Chart for the week of 6 April 2026 and reached number 70 on the overall ARIA Albums Chart.

The album explores themes of personal growth, self-discovery, ageing and reinvention. It incorporates piano-driven songwriting, electronic pop and cinematic arrangements.

The album received coverage from Australian music publications. Women in Pop described its release as "undoubtedly one of 2026's greatest musical moments", while The Hollywood Reporter Australia characterised the project as a creative resurgence and discussed Spencer's development as a songwriter.

In September 2026, Variety Australia published a feature examining Spencer's return to music following the release of Regenerate.

Four music videos were released in support of the album: "Regenerate", directed by Adam Kiers; "Hummingbird", directed by Michelle Pitiris, also known as She Is Aphrodite; "Older", directed by Tim Madden; and "Am I There Yet?", directed by Joe Machart.

The album's promotional campaign included a cover feature in Sellar Magazine, an appearance on the GLOW podcast in conversation with Natalie Bassingthwaighte, and an interview on The Jess Rowe Big Talk Show.

Spencer also performed new material at the Enmore Theatre and appeared as a headline performer at Sydney Gay and Lesbian Mardi Gras.

The title track, "Regenerate", was used in a television promotion for The Traitors on Network 10 and Paramount+. Spencer also supported the album's release with television appearances, including the OzHarvest charity concert on the Seven Network, The House of Wellness on Seven, and a duet with Delta Goodrem on Christmas with Delta on the Nine Network.

== Personal life ==
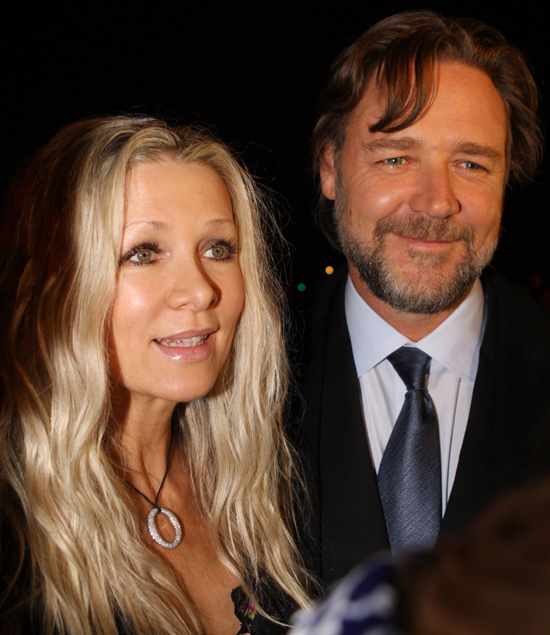
Spencer and then-husband Russell Crowe in September 2011

Spencer began an on-again, off-again relationship with actor Russell Crowe in 1989 when they co-starred in the film The Crossing which appeared in Australian cinemas in 1990. Crowe and Spencer married on 7 April 2003 at Crowe's farm in Nana Glen, New South Wales. They have two sons: Charles, born in 2003 and Tennyson, born in 2006. In October 2012, it was reported that Crowe and Spencer had separated. The divorce was finalised in April 2018.

Since 2016, she has been in a relationship with author and artist Adam Long.

== Discography ==
=== Albums ===
List of albums, with selected details
Title	Details	Peak chart positions
Title	Details	AUS
White Monkey	Released: September 2001; Label: EMI	187
Calling All Magicians	Released: April 2010; Label: Danielle Spencer	—
Lost Luggage (As Lost Luggage)	Released: July 2020; Label: Lost Luggage	—
Regenerate	Released: 27 March 2026; Label: Danielle Spencer	70

=== Charted singles ===
List of charted singles in the top 200
Title	Year	Peak chart positions	Album
Title	Year	AUS	Album
"Blast Off"	2001	95	White Monkey
"Forgive Me" / "Tickle Me"	2001	164	White Monkey
"White Monkey"	2002	147	White Monkey

== Filmography ==
=== Film ===
Year	Title	Role	Notes
1990	The Crossing	Meg	
1990	What the Moon Saw	Emma	
1999	Game Room	Alena	

=== Television ===
Year	Title	Role	Notes
1989	Rafferty's Rules	Toni Moller	Episode: "On the Barricades"
1989	Mission: Impossible	Diane Martin	Episode: "Bayou"
1989–1990	The Flying Doctors	Fiona Jacobs / Sally McCarthy	3 episodes
1991	Hampton Court	Lisa Barrett	13 episodes
1992	Mission Top Secret	Pamela	Television film
1993	Minder	Robyn	Episode: "For a Few Dollars More"
1994	Law of the Land	Barb Brewer	Episode: "Games People Play"
1995	Home and Away	Quinn Jackson	11 episodes
1996	Pacific Drive	Callie Macrae	
1999	Murder Call	Ingrid Nergun	Episode: "Dying Day"
2000	All Saints	Kate Taylor	Episode: "Food for Thought"
2000	Beastmaster	Destine	Episode: "White Tiger"
2012	Dancing With The Stars (Australia)	Performer (Runner Up)	Season 12
2020	The All New Monty: Guys & Gals	Performer	Season One

Preceded by Haley Bracken & Aric Yegudkin	Dancing with the Stars (Australia) runner up Season 12 (2012 with Damian Whitewood)	Succeeded by Rhiannon Fish & Aric Yegudkin
