= Jessica Raffa =

Australian ballroom dancer (born 1984)

Jessica Raffa (born circa 1984) is an Australian ballroom dancer known for appearing on Australia's Dancing with the Stars. She won Series 13 of the televised dance competition with celebrity partner Cosentino. Before competing on Dancing with the Stars, Raffa toured with the dance show Burn the Floor.

== Early life ==
Raffa began dancing ballet at age 3. She began dancing ballroom at age 9 when a studio opened near her home. Between 1995 and 1998 she competed in Latin and Ballroom with Leighton Stevenson. In 1999 at age 15, Raffa competed at the Blackpool Ballroom Dance Competition in the youth category with partner Giuseppe Cosentino. In 2000 she performed at the Closing Ceremony of the 2000 Summer Olympics in Sydney along with Jason Gilkison and Peta Roby.

== Career ==
Raffa joined Burn the Floor at age 17 after catching the eye of choreographer Jason Gilkison. She toured with the production for eight years. One of her numbers in the show included her dancing with a blindfold. That experience inspired her to start a foundation for the blind with Burn the Floor producer Harley Medcalf.

In 2009, Raffa assisted Gilkison with his choreography for So You Think You Can Dance Australia.

=== Dancing with the Stars ===
Raffa spent five series as a professional dancer on Australia's Dancing with the Stars. Her first series was Series 9, when she was paired with blind Paralympian Gerrard Gosens. A rehearsal mishap sent Raffa to the hospital for CAT scans and an MRI. While competing in Series 13 with magician Cosentino, Raffa injured her back and was unable to dance for three weeks. She was temporarily replaced by dancer Sriani Argaet, starting in week 2 of the competition. Cosentino and Raffa went on to win that series of Dancing with the Stars.

| Season | Partner | Place |
|---|---|---|
| 9 | Gerrard Gosens | 4th |
| 10 | Blair McDonough | 10th |
| 11 | Nick Bracks | 6th |
| 12 | Brendan Fevola | 4th |
| 13 | Cosentino | 1st |
| 19 | Anthony Koutoufides | 9th |
| 20 | Matt Preston | 14th |
| 21 | Adam Dovile | 6th/7th |

== Personal life ==
Raffa announced her engagement to Tony Ouliaris in 2012.
