= Curtiss Kingbird =

Airliner built in small numbers in the early 1930s

Model 55 Kingbird
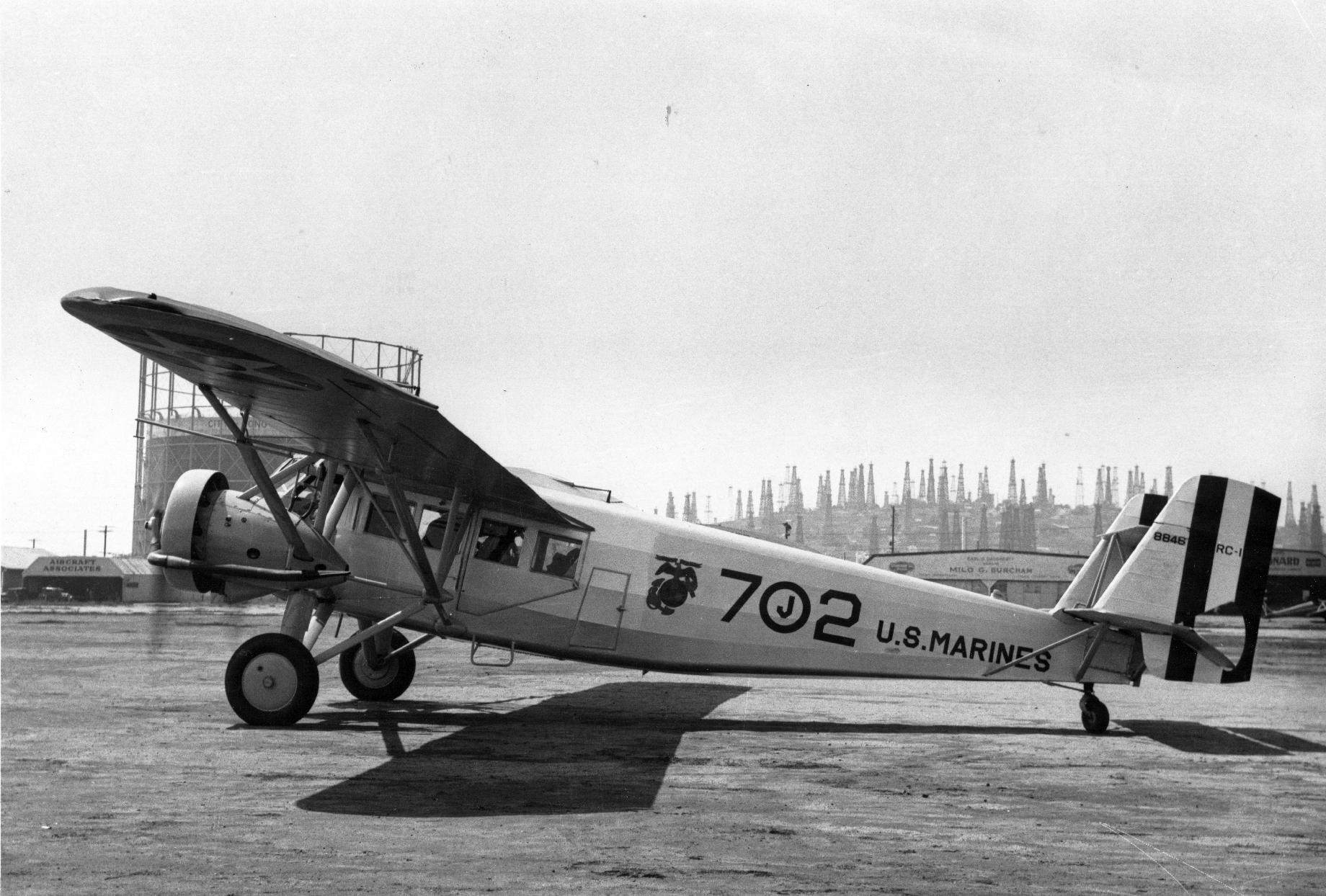
- The Curtiss RC-1

General information
- Type: Airliner
- Manufacturer: Curtiss-Wright
- Designer: Theodore Paul Wright, Al Wedburg
- Primary users: Eastern Air Transport United States Marine Corps
- Number built: 19

History
- First flight: 1929
- Developed from: Curtiss Thrush

The Curtiss Model 55 Kingbird was an airliner built in small numbers in the United States in the early 1930s. It was a twin-engine aircraft with a fuselage derived from the single-engine Curtiss Thrush. The Kingbird had two engine nacelles mounted on the struts on either side of the fuselage that braced the wing and the outrigger undercarriage. A distinctive design feature was the aircraft's blunt nose, located behind the propeller arcs. This allowed the engines to be mounted closer to each other and to the aircraft's centerline, therefore minimising asymmetrical thrust in case of an engine failure. For the same reason, the Thrush's single tailfin was replaced by twin tails on the Kingbird, and the main production model, the D-2 fitted a second horizontal stabilizer and elevator between these fins.

Eastern Air Transport was to be the Kingbird's main operator, flying 14 of them for a few years. The United States Marine Corps also purchased an example, first designating it JC-1, then RC-1 and using it as an air ambulance.

== Variants ==
Kingbird C
Prototype powered by 185 hp (138 kW) six-cylinder Curtiss R-600 Challenger engines. One built, but found to be underpowered. Later converted to Kingbird J-1.
Kingbird D-1
Second and third prototypes (previously Kingbird J-3 and J-2) powered by 225 hp nine-cylinder Wright Whirlwind J-6-7 radial engines. Later converted to D-2 standard.
Kingbird D-2
Production aircraft with two 300 hp (224 kW) Whirlwind J-6-9 engines. 14 built plus two converted from D-1s.
Kingbird D-3
One-off Curtiss executive transport. Two 330 hp (246 kW) Whirlwind J-6-9 engines. Seats for five passengers.
Kingbird J-1
First prototype after re-engining with Whirlwind engines.
Kingbird J-2
Third prototype, J-6-7 engines.
Kingbird J-3
Second prototype, J-6-9 engines.
RC-1
Single Kingbird D-2 for US Navy, originally ordered as JC-1 (J for utility), but delivered as RC-1 (R for transport).

== Operators ==
United States

- Eastern Air Transport
- United States Marine Corps

Turkey

- Turkish Airlines (under former official name: State Airlines Administration)

== Specifications (D-2) ==
Data from Curtiss Aircraft, 1907–1947

General characteristics

- Crew: 1
- Capacity: 7 pax
- Length: 34 ft 5.125 in (10.49338 m)
- Wingspan: 54 ft 6 in (16.61 m)
- Height: 10 ft 0 in (3.05 m)
- Wing area: 405 sq ft (37.6 m^{2})
- Airfoil: Curtiss C-72
- Empty weight: 3,877 lb (1,759 kg)
- Gross weight: 6,115 lb (2,774 kg)
- Powerplant: 2 × Wright J-6-9 Whirlwind 9-cylinder air-cooled radial piston engine, 300 hp (220 kW) each

Performance

- Maximum speed: 142 mph (229 km/h, 123 kn)
- Cruise speed: 112 mph (180 km/h, 97 kn)
- Range: 415 mi (668 km, 361 nmi)
- Service ceiling: 16,000 ft (4,900 m)
- Rate of climb: 1,000 ft/min (5.1 m/s)

== See also ==
Related lists

- List of United States Navy aircraft designations (pre-1962)
