= Damian Whitewood =

Australian dancer

Damian Whitewood is an Australian dancer and former dancesport competitor.

== Background ==
Born and raised in Perth, Western Australia Damian was first introduced to ballroom dancing at the age of 10 through his older brother. His mother was also a competitive ballroom dancer in her childhood days in London.

From the age of 14, Damian was traveling across Australia competing in both ballroom and Latin competitions. He became National state champion, Australian champion, and Australasian champion in both ballroom and Latin and represented Australia in many world competitions.

== Career ==
In 2001, he joined the cast of Burn the Floor, which has sold millions of tickets in over 30 countries and 160 cities worldwide. He was a dancer with the company in 2009 making his Broadway debut. In 2010, Damian made the move to prime-time television in the United States as one of the professional dancers on ABC's top rated program, Dancing with the Stars on season 10. He was partnered with Pamela Anderson who he has continually been working with all around the world. Damian has guest appeared on the Israeli Rokdim Im Kokhavim רוקדים עם כוכבים, version of Dancing with the Stars. He has also competed on the Argentine Bailando por un Sueño Series 7. Damian has choreographed and appeared on So You Think You Can Dance in Australia and the Netherlands and also La Academia in Mexico. He was a Co-Host at the Just for Laughs comedy festival in Montreal, Quebec, Canada for Pamela Anderson's Variety Gala. Damian was a runner-up on the Australian Dancing with the Stars season 12 with Danielle Spencer.

Preceded by Haley Bracken & Aric Yegudkin	Dancing with the Stars (Australia) runner up Season 12 (2012 with Danielle Spencer)	Succeeded by Rhiannon Fish & Aric Yegudkin
Preceded by Zoe Crammond & Aric Yegudkin	Dancing with the Stars (Australia) third place contestant Season 13 (2013 with Tina Arena)	Succeeded by Ricki-Lee Coulter & Jarryd Byrne
