= Curtiss Thrush =

1929 American single-engine monoplane light transport

Model 56 Thrush/Thrush J
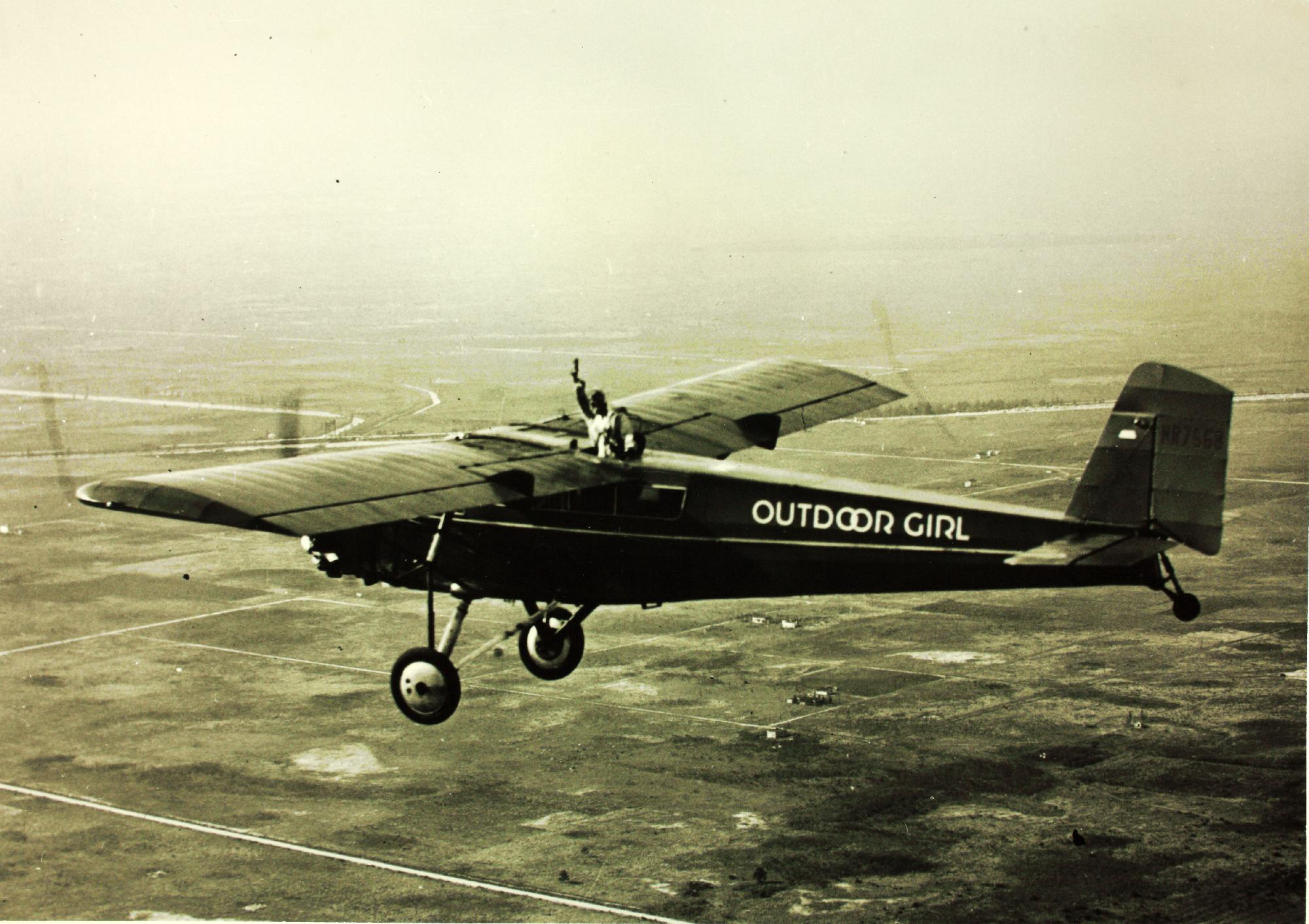
- Thrush J "Outdoor Girl" setting a record of 237 hours 42 minutes aloft (nearly 10 days) in 1933

General information
- Type: Airliner/utility transport
- Manufacturer: Curtiss Aeroplane and Motor Company
- Designer: T.P. Wright
- Status: Retired
- Number built: 13

History
- First flight: 1929
- Developed into: Curtiss Kingbird

The Curtiss/Curtiss-Robertson Model 56 Thrush (Note: All Curtiss model numbers lower than 75 were assigned retroactively.) was a 1929 six passenger high-wing fixed undercarriage single-engine cabin monoplane airliner and utility transport powered by either a Curtiss Challenger or a Wright Whirlwind radial engine and built as an enlargement of the earlier Curtiss Robin. Several were used for record breaking endurance flights by female pilots during the early 1930s including one in which the aircraft stayed aloft for almost ten days.

== Design and development ==
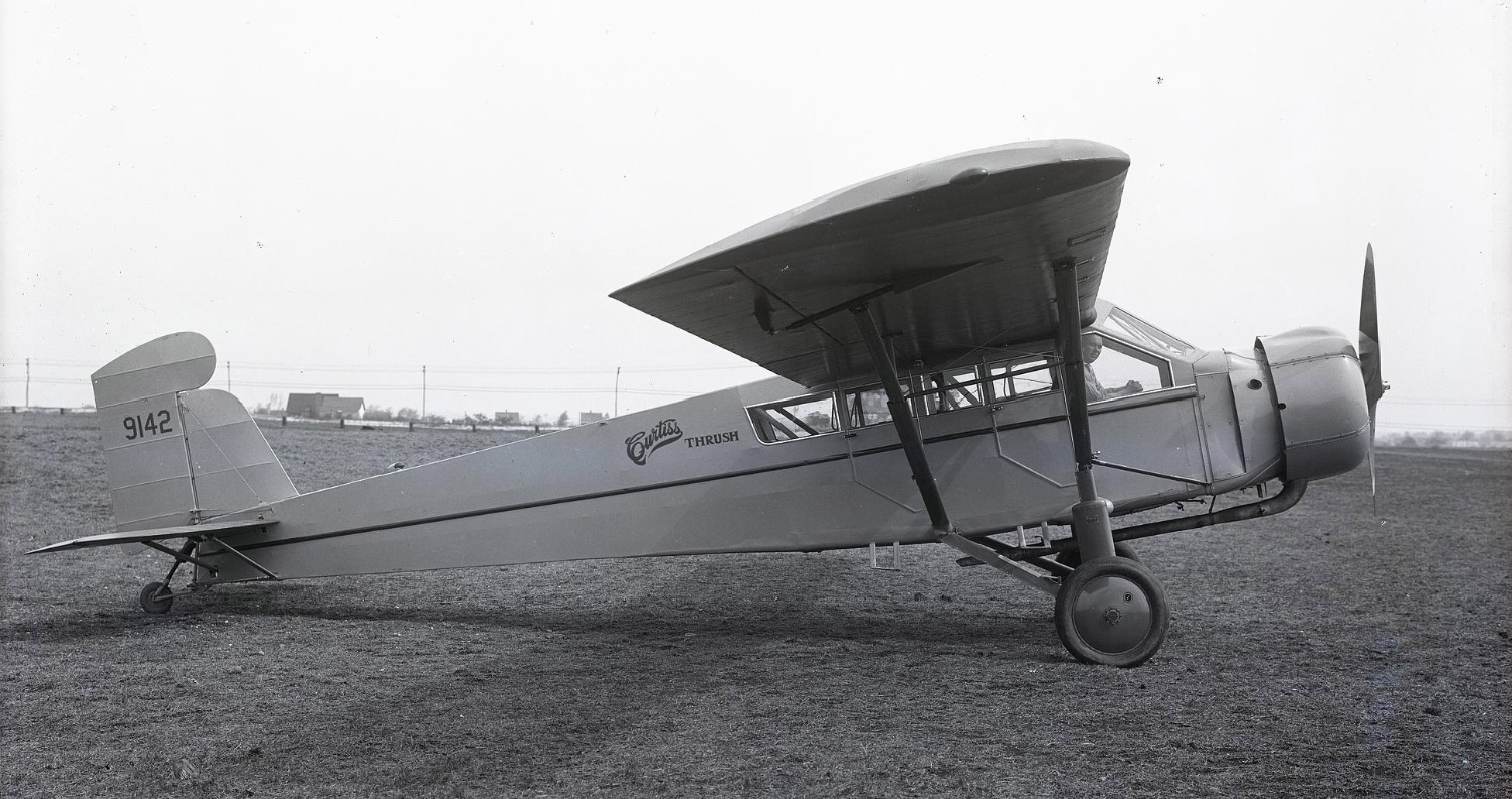
Prototype Thrush with Challenger engine in experimental cowling and prototype rudder shape

Three 170 hp (130 kW) Curtiss Challenger-engined Curtiss Thrush prototypes (serialled G-1 to G-3) were built at Curtiss' Garden City factory, but these were underpowered and production examples, redesignated Thrush J (serialled 1001 to 1010) with 225 hp (168 kW) Wright Whirlwind engines, were built at the Curtiss-Robertson St Louis factory. All three prototypes were later re-engined with Whirlwinds to make them Thrush Js. The fuselage of the Thrush formed the basis for the twin-engine Curtiss Kingbird which was developed roughly in parallel.

The fuselage was built up as a Pratt truss frame formed mainly from Duraluminum tubing and fittings with welded Chrome-moly tubing reinforcing highly stressed areas and covered in fabric. The wing was a fabric covered semi-cantilever (Note: The inner portion of the wing was strut braced, while the outboard was cantilever.) braced with steel tube struts, and had solid spruce spars and stamped Alclad ribs with Alclad sheet wrapped over leading edge. A fuel tank is mounted within each wing near the root. Rudder and elevators were welded chrome-moly steel tubing. 116" track undercarriage is fitted with oleo-pneumatic shock absorbers and Bendix brakes, and is braced to the front struts and lower longerons.

== Operational history ==
Twelve examples were ordered by China National Aviation Corporation (CNAC) but only ten production examples were built. All but one was then registered in the US, as many aircraft exported to the CNAC were, however only one example made it to China, which it did in 1930, and it may not have entered CNAC service. One of the ten was lost on its first flight (serial 1006) and its registration was transferred to the next aircraft built. One of the prototypes went to Venezuela to a private individual, and a production example went to Cuba where it was the first aircraft operated by the Compañía Nacional Cubana de Aviación Curtiss (CNCAC), forerunner of Cubana de Aviación, Cuba's national airline.

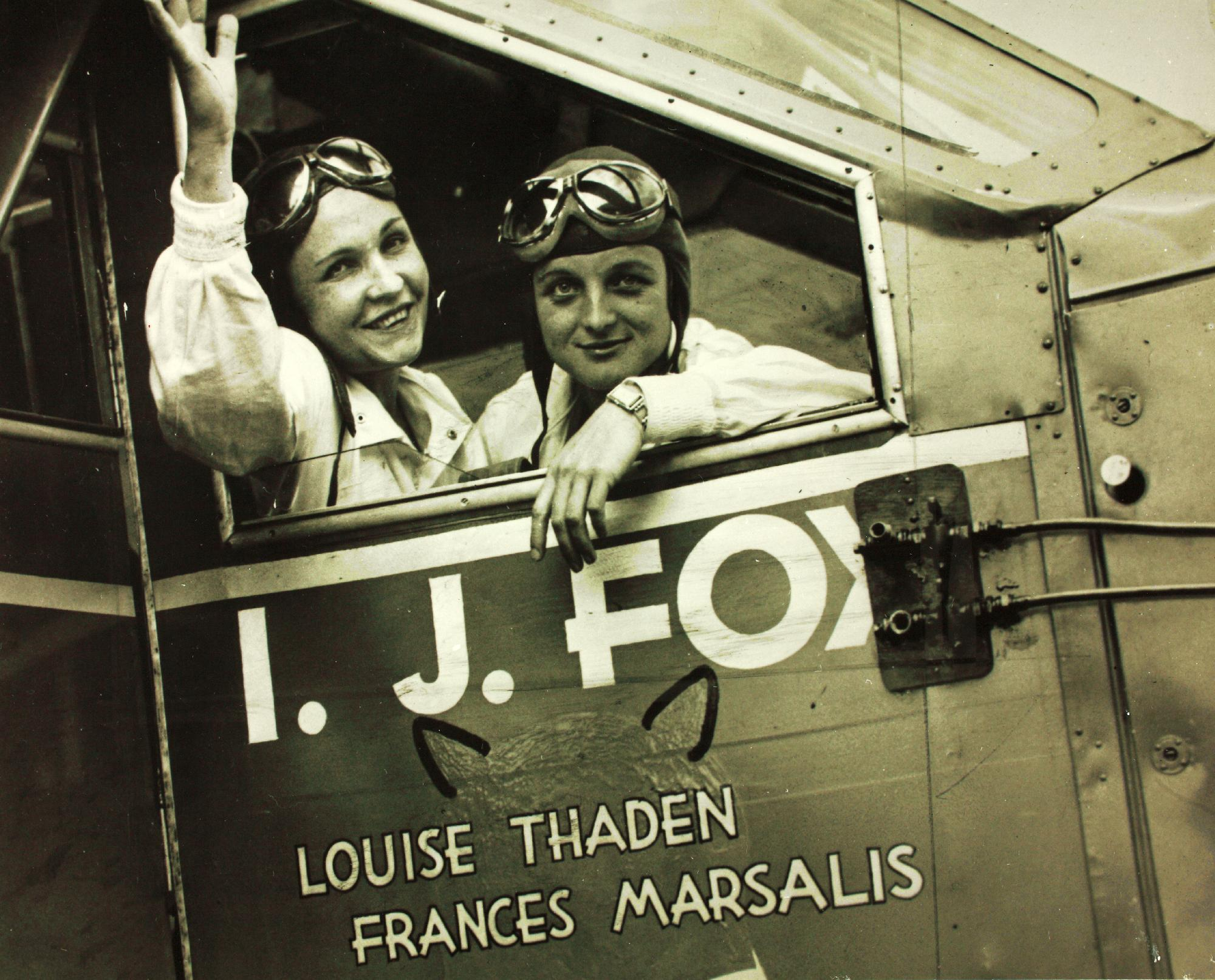
Louise Thaden and Frances Marsalis in the cockpit of Thrush, "I.J. Fox", in which they broke the women's endurance record for a flight of 196 hours 5 minutes in 1932.

From the 14th to the 22nd of August 1932, Louise Thaden & Frances Marsalis flew prototype Thrush J NC9142 "I.J. Fox" (named for their sponsor, a fur coat company and nicknamed the "Flying Boudoir" by the press) for 196 hours 5 minutes, refuelling in flight from a Curtiss Robin to set an endurance record near Valley Stream, New York. For this and other record-breaking flights, Thaden received the Harmon Trophy in 1936. Helen Richey and Frances Marsalis flew production Thrush J NC7568 "Outdoor Girl" (named for a brand of women's cosmetics, a new sponsor) for 237 hours, 42 minutes (nearly ten days) from the 20th to the 30th of December 1933 over Miami, Florida. Like the first flight, it too was refuelled from the air from a Curtiss Robin. Jean LaRene and Mary Elizabeth Owens made five attempts at the world's endurance record at the Curtiss-Reynolds Airport in August during the 1934 Chicago World's Fair in Curtiss Thrush J NR581N "Lone Star" Jean LaRene made another attempt in NR581N on the record with Henrietta Sumner from 8 December to 30 November 1934 over Oklahoma City but experienced engine problems and was forced down after 198 hours and 13 minutes aloft.

Two examples found their way to Alaska where they were used as bush planes, one by Ralph Savory before he joined Star Air Service, and a second was flown in Alaska by Gordon MacKenzie. The remainder were used in the United States by various operators as air taxis and feeder airliners.

== Operators ==
Cuba
Compañía Nacional Cubana de Aviación Curtiss (CNCAC) - one example registered NM-3.
Republic of China
unknown operator(s) - one example, unknown registration.
United States
various operators.

== Variants ==
- Thrush (ATC 159 & 160) - prototypes powered by 170 hp Curtiss Challenger, three built, all converted to Thrush J (ATC 236).
- Thrush J (ATC 261) - main production variant with 225 hp Wright J-6-7 Whirlwind, 10 built.
- Thrush Special - one converted from a Thrush J with 240 hp Wright J-6-7 Whirlwind. and a second converted with Wright J-5.

== Specifications (Thrush J - ATC 261) ==
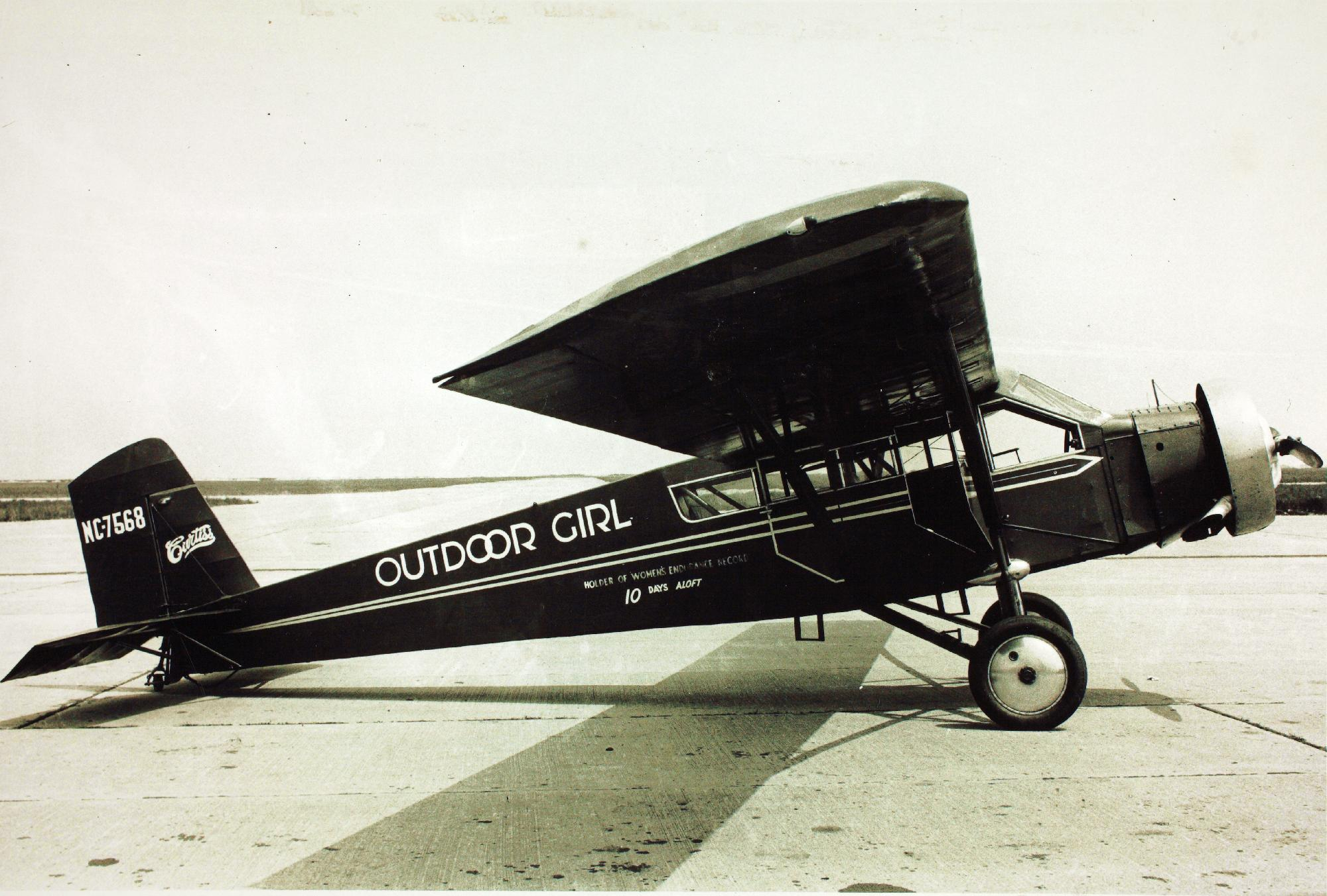
Curtiss Thrush J "Outdoor Girl".

Data from Juptner, Joseph P. (1966). US Civil Aircraft: Vol. 3 (ATC 201 - 300). Fallbrook, CA: Aero Publishers. pp. 177–178. ASIN B000VHTNB4.

General characteristics

- Crew: one-two (dual controls)
- Capacity: six passengers
- Length: 32 ft 7 in (9.93 m)
- Wingspan: 48 ft 0 in (14.63 m)
- Height: 9 ft 3 in (2.82 m)
- Wing area: 305 sq ft (28.3 m^{2})
- Airfoil: Curtiss C-72 Chord: 7 ft 0 in (2.13 m)
- Empty weight: 2,260 lb (1,025 kg)
- Gross weight: 3,800 lb (1,724 kg)
- Fuel capacity: 110 US gal (92 imp gal; 420 L)
- Oil capacity: 9 US gal (7.5 imp gal; 34 L)
- Powerplant: 1 × Wright J-6-7 (R-760) radial engine, 225 hp (168 kW)
- Propellers: 2-bladed Curtiss-Reed metal fixed pitch propeller

Performance

- Maximum speed: 122 mph (196 km/h, 106 kn)
- Cruise speed: 104 mph (167 km/h, 90 kn)
- Minimum control speed: 52 mph (84 km/h, 45 kn)
- Range: 900 mi (1,400 km, 780 nmi)
- Service ceiling: 13,200 ft (4,000 m)
- Rate of climb: 650 ft/min (3.3 m/s) from sea level
- Time to altitude: 10 minutes to 5300 feet
- Wing loading: 12.46 lb/sq ft (60.8 kg/m^{2})
- Fuel consumption: .76 lb/mi (0.21 kg/km)

== See also ==
- 1929 in aviation

Related development

- Curtiss Robin
- Curtiss Kingbird

Aircraft of comparable role, configuration, and era

- Bellanca CH-300 Pacemaker
- Fairchild 71
- Fokker Super Universal
- Ryan Brougham
- Stinson Detroiter
- Travel Air 6000
- Yakovlev AIR-5

== Bibliography ==
- Aerofiles.com Curtiss K through Z created: 24 January 2009 accessdate:May 2014
- Golden Years of Aviation accessdate:May 2014
- Andersson, Lennart (2008). A History of Chinese Aviation - Encyclopedia of Aircraft and Aviation in China until 1949. Taipei, Taiwan, ROC: AHS of ROC. ISBN 978-9572853337.
- Bowden, Terry L. (February 1995). "Curtiss Robin NR-82H making history". Sport Aviation: 79–85.
- Bowers, Peter M. (1979). Curtiss Aircraft 1907-1947. London: Putnam. ISBN 9780851778112.
- Juptner, Joseph P. (1964). US Civil Aircraft: Vol. 2 (ATC 101 - 200). Fallbrook, CA: Aero Publishers. pp. 169–172. ASIN B00IQTUTU8.
- Juptner, Joseph P. (1966). US Civil Aircraft: Vol. 3 (ATC 201 - 300). Fallbrook, CA: Aero Publishers. pp. 109–111 & 177–178. ASIN B000VHTNB4.
- Oakes, Claudia M. (1985). United States Women in Aviation 1930-1939 (PDF). Smithsonian Studies in Air and Space Number 6. Washington, DC: Smithsonian Institution Press.
- Plehinger, Russell (1989). Marathon Flyers. Harlo Press. ISBN 978-0818701122.
