= Cosentino (illusionist) =

Australian magician

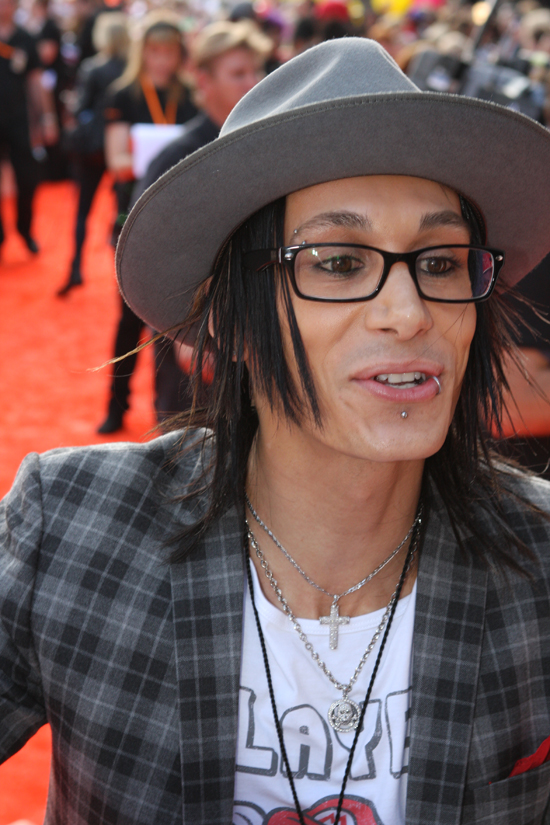
Cosentino (2011)

Paul Cosentino (born 2 November 1982), known mononymously by his stage name Cosentino, is an Australian illusionist and escapologist.

== Early life ==
Cosentino's mother was a school principal, and his father was a civil and structural engineer. As a child, he found a magic book in a library which fascinated him, but, due to his learning difficulties, his mother had to explain the contents of the book to him while he looked at the pictures. Once when he was 13, he and his mother got locked out of the house. In order to get inside, Cosentino picked the locks. After being successful, he practised picking locks, a skill he would use in his magic performances.

Cosentino attended Wesley College, Melbourne, during his high school years.

== Career ==
His first television appearance was on the Australian variety show Hey Hey It's Saturday when he was still in high school, for which he won prize money.

On 17 February 2010, Cosentino, in honor of Harry Houdini's jump off Queen's Bridge in Melbourne on the same day in 1910, performed a tribute underwater escape act. He was shackled to a 60 kg concrete block and sunk to the bottom of the main tank in the Melbourne Aquarium. He was surrounded by various fish, sharks and rays, and had to free himself from using only a lock pick. Cosentino planned to complete the escape in 2 minutes 30 seconds, but due to problems with a padlock and his belly chain, the escape took 3 minutes 39 seconds.

Cosentino auditioned in Melbourne for Australia's Got Talent with an illusion routine. He advanced in the competition after earning praise from the judges. In the preliminary finals, he performed an escape act, in which he had to pick nine locks while completely submerged in a tank of water suspended above the ground. The escape took 1 minute 45 seconds. For the semi-final Cosentino performed an illusion routine, disappearing and reappearing in military style dance. In the finale, Cosentino escaped from a straitjacket while suspended from his ankles, six meters above the ground, inside a jaws-like apparatus. These jaws were held open by a single piece of rope that was set on fire for the act. Cosentino had to escape before the rope burned through and the jaws snapped around his ankle with over 200 kg of force. Overall, Cosentino came second in the 2011 series of Australia's Got Talent, losing to Jack Vidgen.

Cosentino performed at Carols in the Domain in Sydney for magic tricks and the arrival of Santa Claus.

He won Dancing with the Stars on 26 November 2013, along with his dancing partner Jessica Raffa.

Cosentino has appeared in three Magic, The Mystery, The Madness episodes, in which he performed illusions, escapes and street magic on the streets of Melbourne and Sydney.

Cosentino appeared at the Asia's Got Talent result show, where he performed a disappearing act.

He competed in America's Got Talent: The Champions in 2019. He did not advance to the finals.

He appeared as an intruder in the sixth season of I'm a Celebrity...Get Me Out of Here! Australia in 2020.

In October 2016, Cosentino published his first book, Anything is Possible: The Magic, The Mystery, The Life (2016). In it,, he talks about his mind patterns and inspirations and how they helped him in his illusion career.

He played himself in the 2017 Jackie Chan film Bleeding Steel.
