= Helen Richey =

American aviator

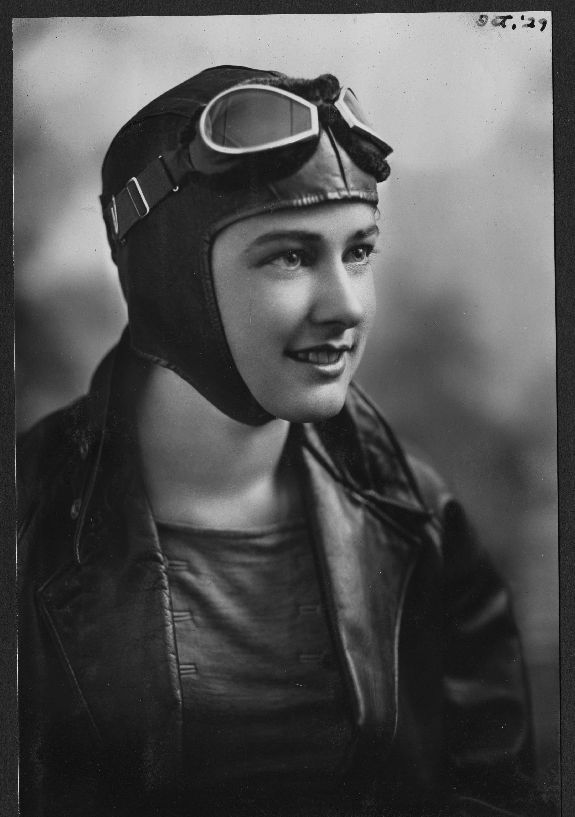
- Richey in 1929
- Born: Helen Richey; November 21, 1909; McKeesport, Pennsylvania, U.S.
- Died: January 7, 1947 (aged 37); New York City, New York, U.S.
- Occupation: Aviator

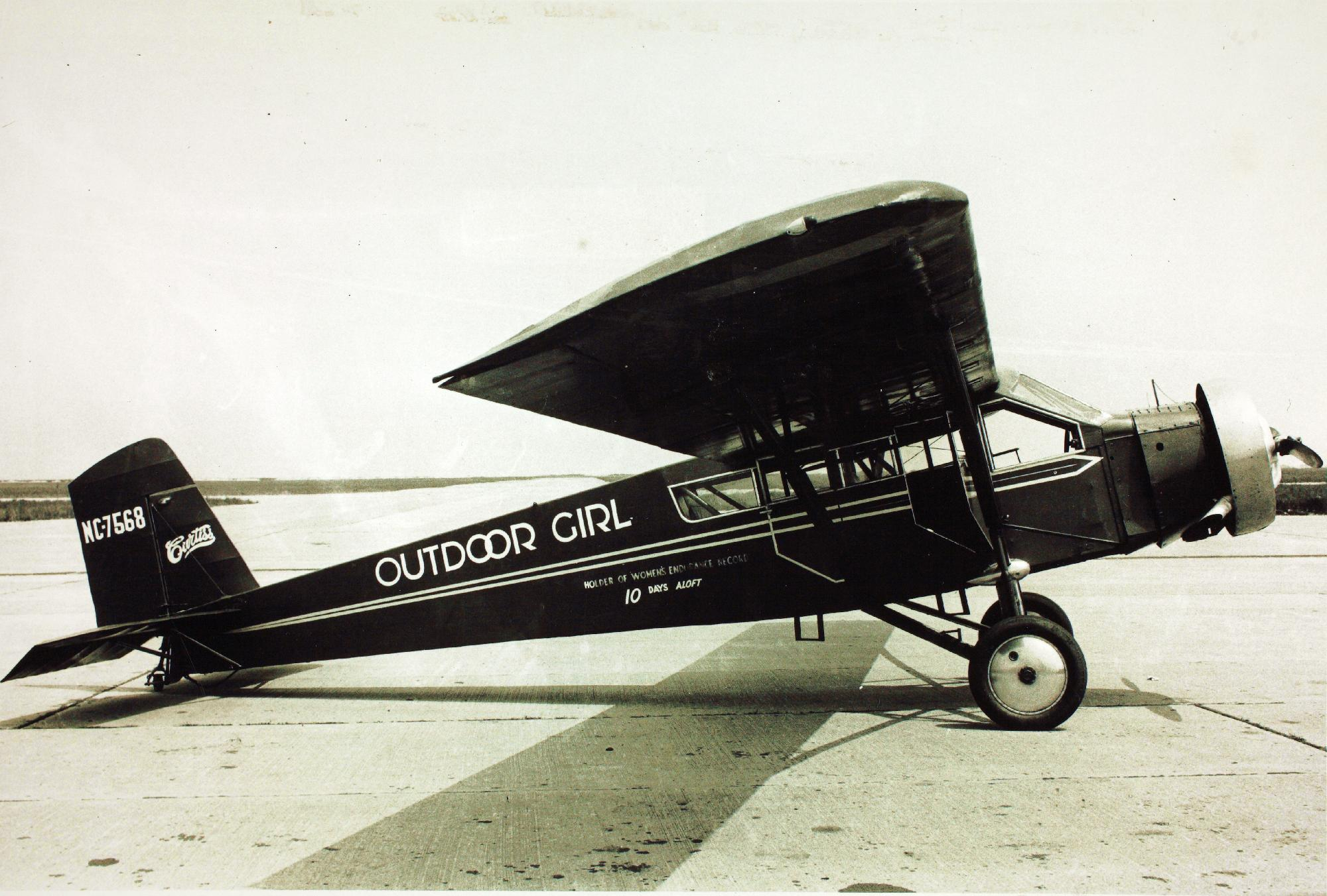
"Outdoor Girl" after the record flight

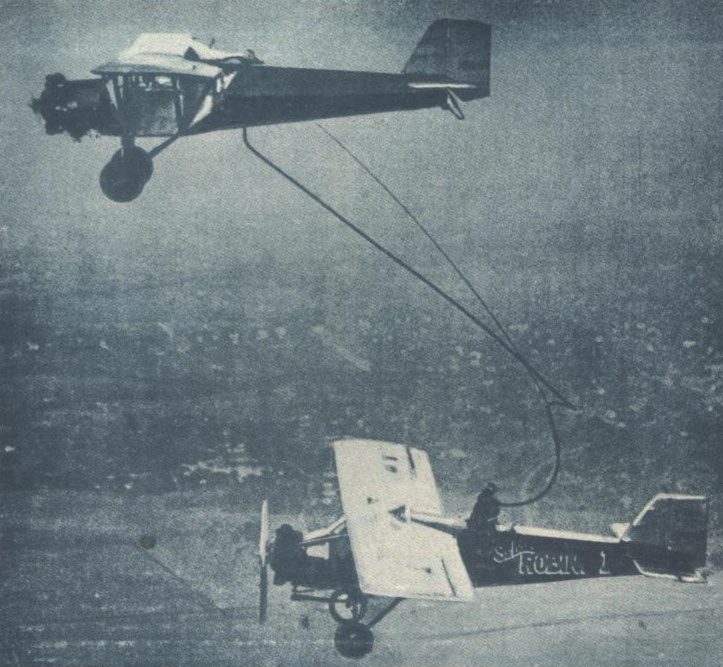
A Curtiss Robin flown by Dale Jackson and Forest O'Brine being refueled by a Curtiss Thrush during another flight endurance record in 1929.

Helen Richey (November 21, 1909 – January 7, 1947) was a pioneering female aviator and the first woman to be hired as a pilot by a commercial airline in the United States.

In 1933, she and her flying partner, Frances Harrell Marsalis, set a women's fueling endurance record of 237 hours and 42 minutes above the city of Miami in their airplane, the "Flying Boudoir."

Three years later, Richey set a women's international light plane record of 100 kilometers traveled in 55 minutes. As a co-pilot in the Bendix race that same year with Amelia Earhart, she secured the women's light plane altitude record. During World War II, Richey became the first female pilot from Pittsburgh, Pennsylvania at the war front in Europe.

== Formative years ==
Born in McKeesport, Pennsylvania on November 21, 1909, Helen Richey was a daughter of Joseph Burdette Richey (1865-1947), the superintendent of schools in McKeesport from 1902 to 1935, and Amy Seal (Winter) Richey (1872-1943). She and her siblings spent many of their formative years in McKeesport.

A 1927 graduate of McKeesport High School, Helen Richey was one of the few girls in McKeesport who wore pants during her teen years. She learned how to fly a plane at age 20. Her father subsequently bought her a Bird plane when she obtained her pilot's license.

== Aviation career ==
In December 1933 Richey partnered with another female pilot, Frances Marsalis, to set an endurance record by staying airborne for nearly 10 days over Miami, Florida, with midair refueling. Their aircraft was a Curtiss Thrush, named "Outdoor Girl" after its sponsor, a cosmetics brand. (Note: Outdoor Girl was launched in 1928 and was aimed at women who wore makeup in public. The makers were the Crystal Chemical Company. The company's headquarters were located at E. 134th Street & Willis Avenue, The Bronx, NYC, north of the Willis Avenue Bridge.) Marsalis had previously set an endurance record the previous year with Louise Thaden in another Thrush. The refuelling was achieved by opening the central hatch, grabbing a dangling hose out of a Curtiss Robin and shoving it into the gas tank, which Richey likened to "wrestling with a cobra in a hurricane". Marsalis was killed during the 1934 Women's Air Meet in Dayton.

In 1934 Richey won the premier air race at the first National Air Meet for women in Dayton, Ohio. Also in 1934, Central Airlines, a Greensburg, Pennsylvania–based carrier that eventually became part of United Airlines, hired Richey as a pilot; she made her first regular civil flight with them on December 31, taking a Ford Trimotor on the Washington to Detroit route. The airline had restrictions placed upon Richey on when she could fly, limiting her to fair weather. She resigned before completing a year with the airlines.

In May 1936, Helen Richey, flying a light plane, set an international altitude record for aircraft weighing under 200 kilograms (440 lb). She reached 18,448 feet (5,623 m) during a flight from Congressional Airport to Endless Caverns Airport in New Market, Virginia. Richey flew the same plane that Benjamin King had flown to break the record previously. Helen was hired by the federal government's Bureau of Air Transport to assist with air marking, the act of making large signs on the ground or on rooftops to assist aviators in determining their location while airborne.

After leaving Central Airlines, Richey continued to perform at air shows. In 1936 she teamed with Amelia Earhart in a transcontinental air race, the Bendix Trophy Race. Richey and Earhart came in fifth, beating some all-male teams. Later, Richey flew with the British Air Transport Auxiliary during World War II.

After a year of ferrying British airplanes, Richey resigned from her Air Transport position on March 31, 1943, and returned home to McKeesport to be closer to her ailing mother, saying, "I felt mother needed me."

On September 11, 1943, Richey and professional golfer Helen Detweiler were awarded their Army Air Force wings at Avenger Field in Sweetwater, Texas during a ceremony presided over by Jacqueline Cochran. Three weeks later, her mother died at their McKeesport home on October 2.

In 1944, Richey was a member of the Women Airforce Service Pilots (WASPs) and was stationed at the New Castle Army Air Base in Delaware, where she was responsible for ferrying military planes to and from Canada.

In addition to being the first female commercial airline pilot, Richey also was the first woman sworn in to pilot air mail and one of the first female flight instructors.

=== Accident and injury ===
Sometime during late May or early June of 1945, Richey injured her spine during an airplane accident. She spent several weeks recuperating at a private hospital in New York. Her sister, Amy, subsequently claimed that reports of Helen's accident and injury were untrue.

== Death, funeral and interment ==
Richey died in her apartment in New York City on January 7, 1947, apparently from a pill overdose. Her death was ruled a suicide. The Richmond Times-Dispatch and The Montana Standard reported that she had been under the care of a physician for depression at the time of her death.

Her funeral was held in her hometown of McKeesport, Pennsylvania on January 10, 1947, and she was then interred at that community's Versailles Cemetery.
