= List of I'm a Celebrity...Get Me Out of Here! (Australian TV series) contestants =

I'm a Celebrity...Get Me Out of Here! is an Australian reality television series in which celebrity contestants live together in a jungle environment for a few weeks, with no luxuries or contact from the outside world. The celebrities have to complete Bushtucker Trials to earn food for camp, or else they must survive off of basic rations.

The first season premiered in 2015 and there have been eleven series filmed in total since then. The series is filmed in the Kruger National Park in South Africa. During each series, contestants are progressively eliminated on the basis of public voting, with the eventual winner being crowned either the King or Queen of the Jungle and winning $100,000 for their chosen charity.

== Contestants ==
As of season 12, 162 celebrities have competed. In the show's history, seven celebrities have withdrawn or walked from the show (two in season 4, one each from seasons 7 to 12), before being voted out. In total, there have been six Kings and five Queens of the Jungle. Shane Warne and Cal Wilson are the only two contestants to have since died.

Key
Winner – King/Queen of the Jungle
Runner-up
Third place
Withdrew
Participating

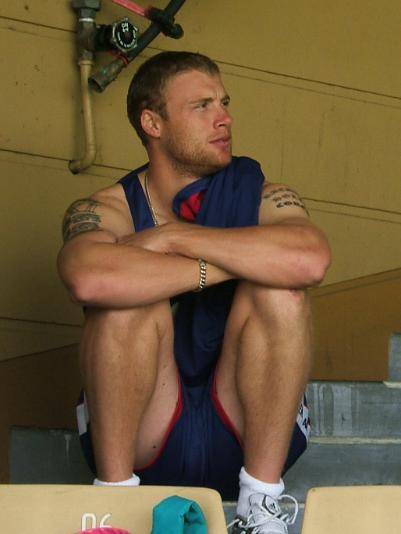
Freddie Flintoff, winner of season 1 (2015)

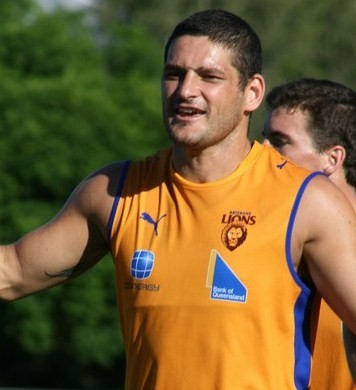
Brendan Fevola, winner of season 2 (2016)

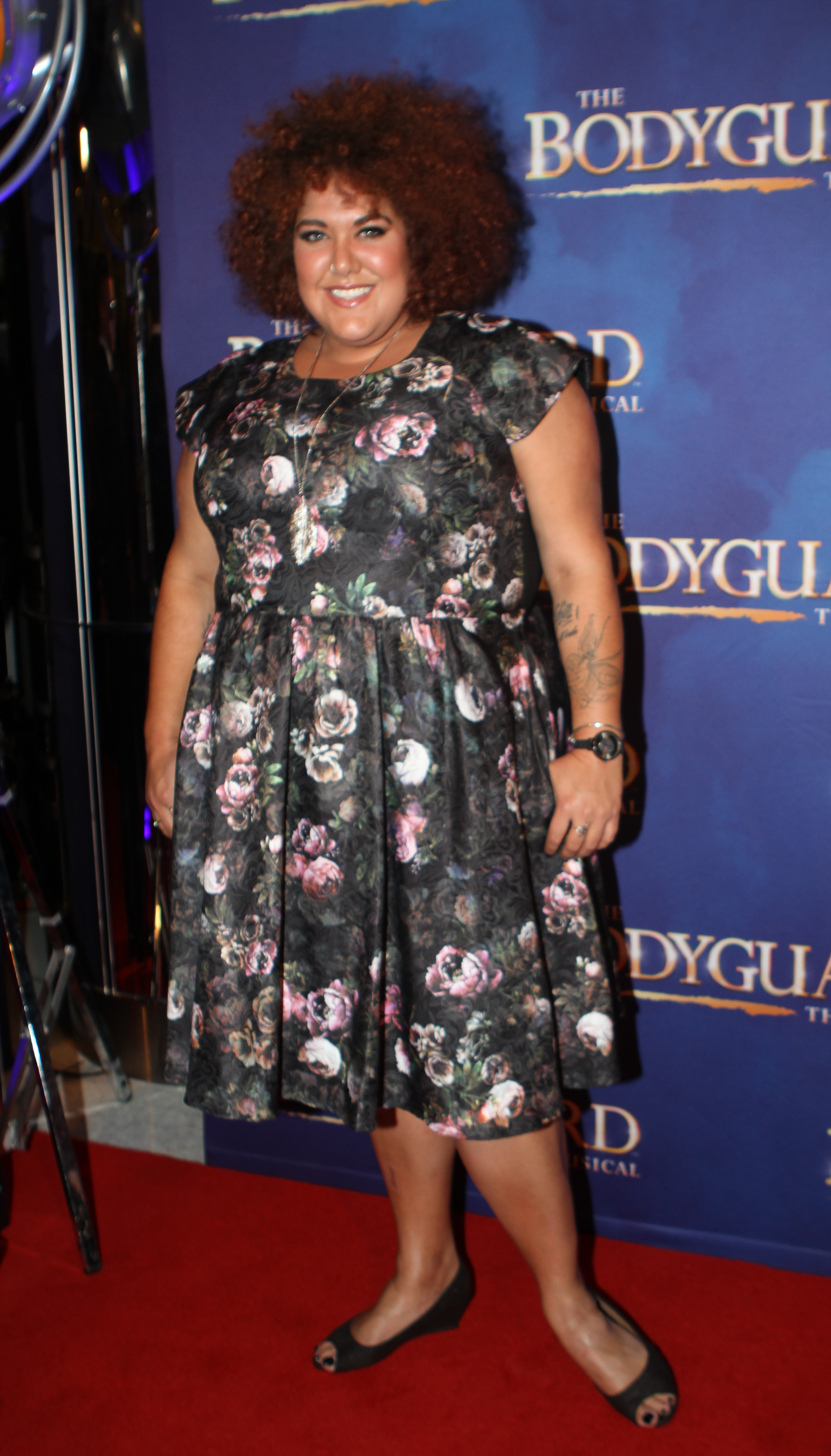
Casey Donovan, winner of season 3 (2017)

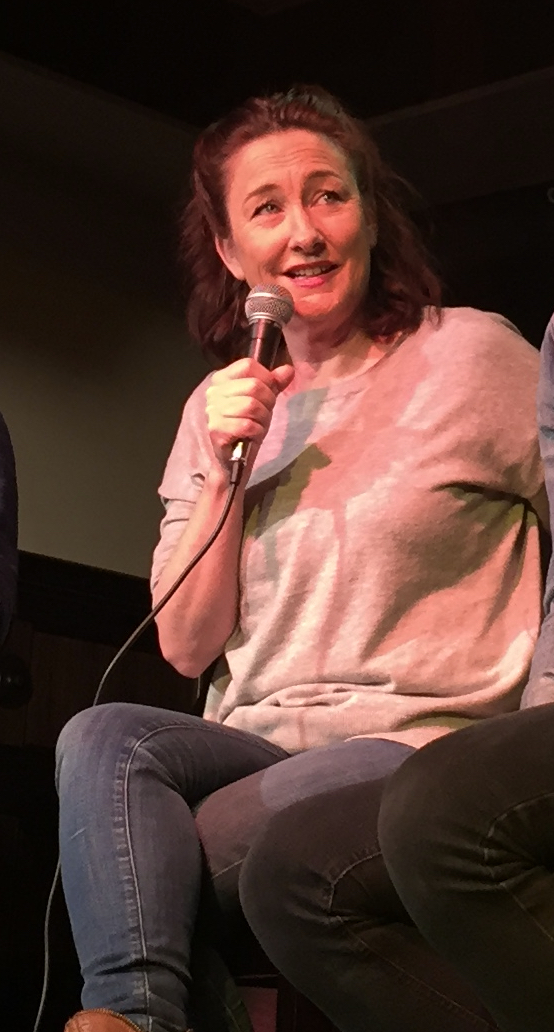
Fiona O'Loughlin, winner of season 4 (2018)

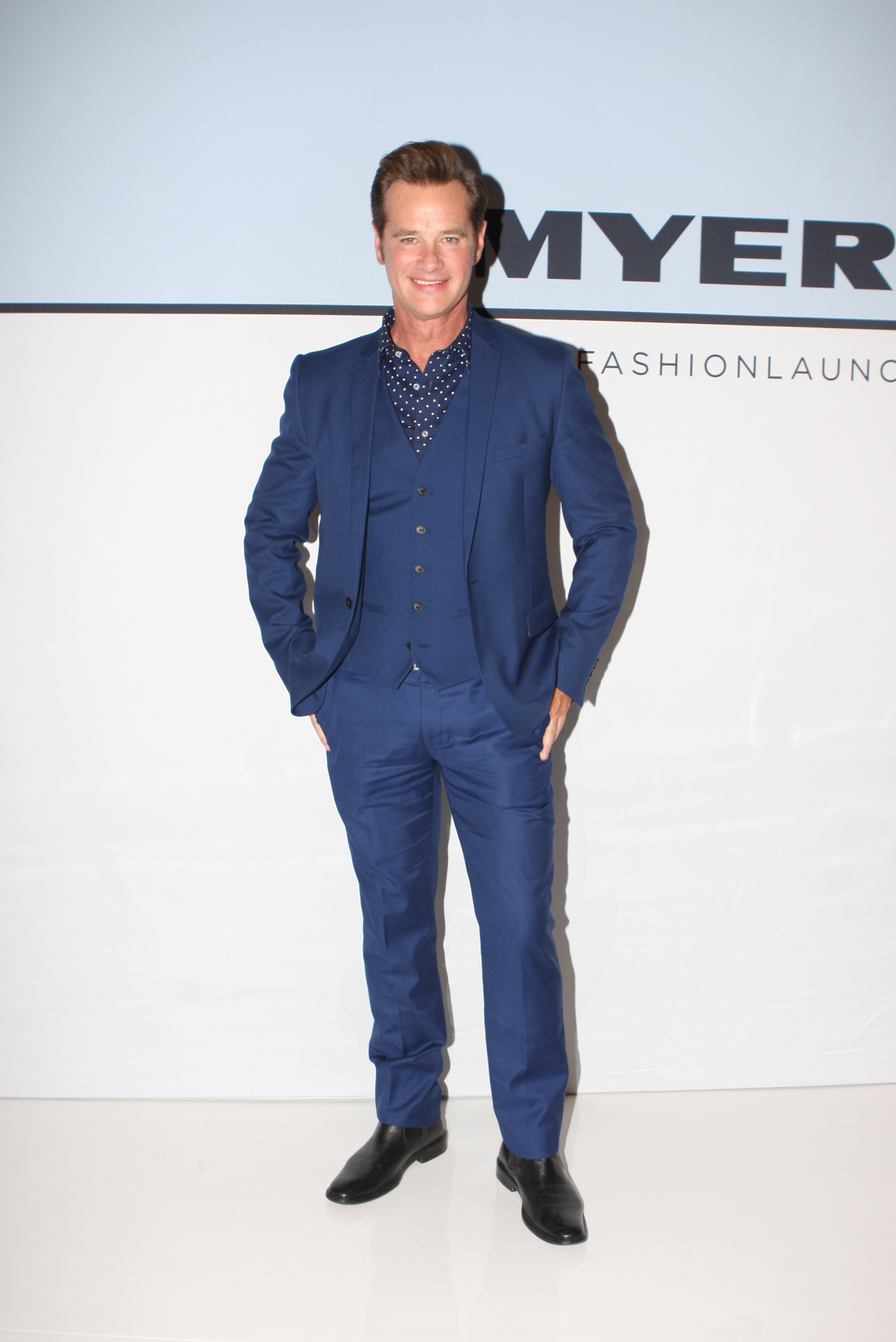
Richard Reid, winner of season 5 (2019)

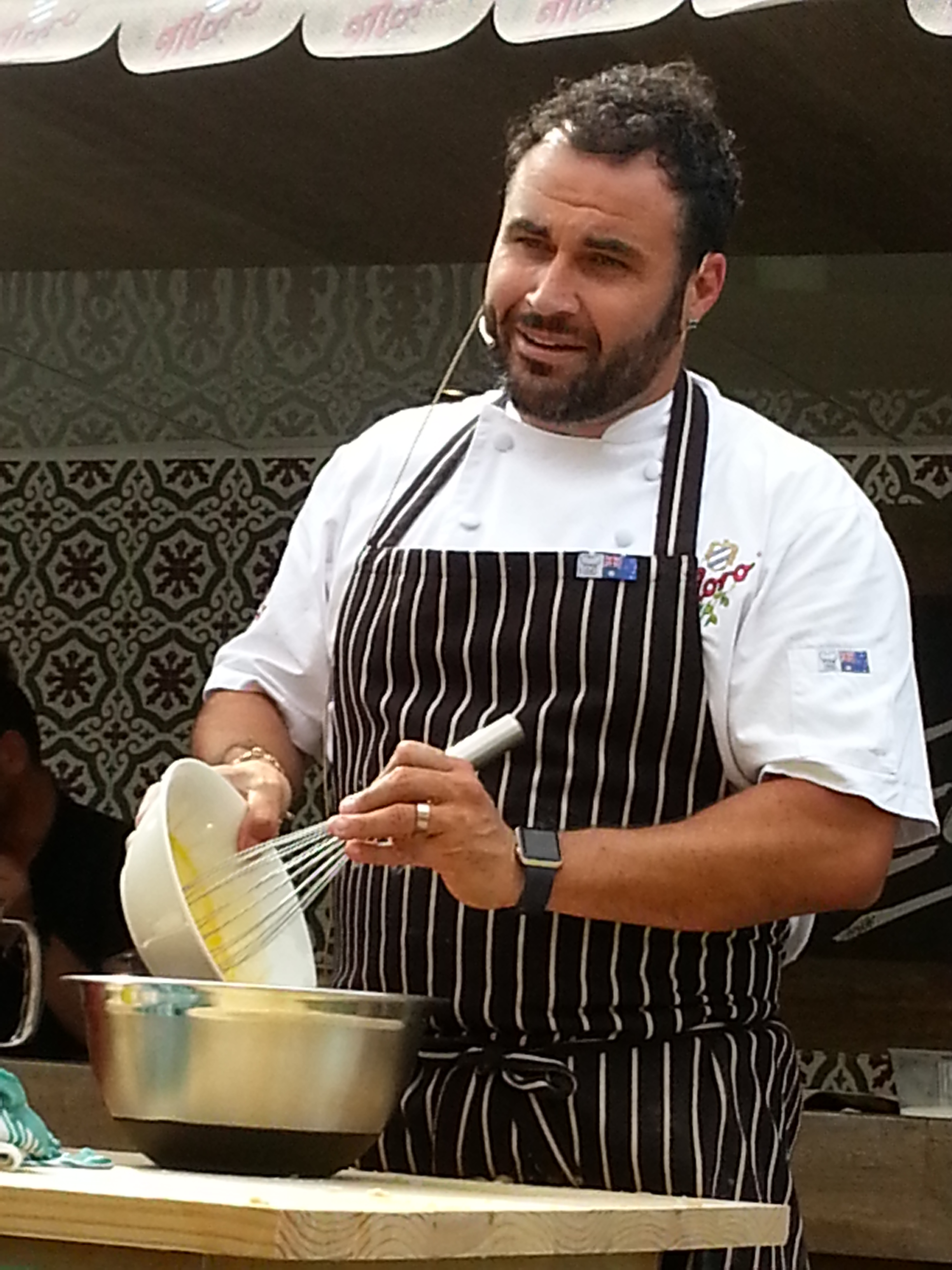
Miguel Maestre, winner of season 6 (2020)

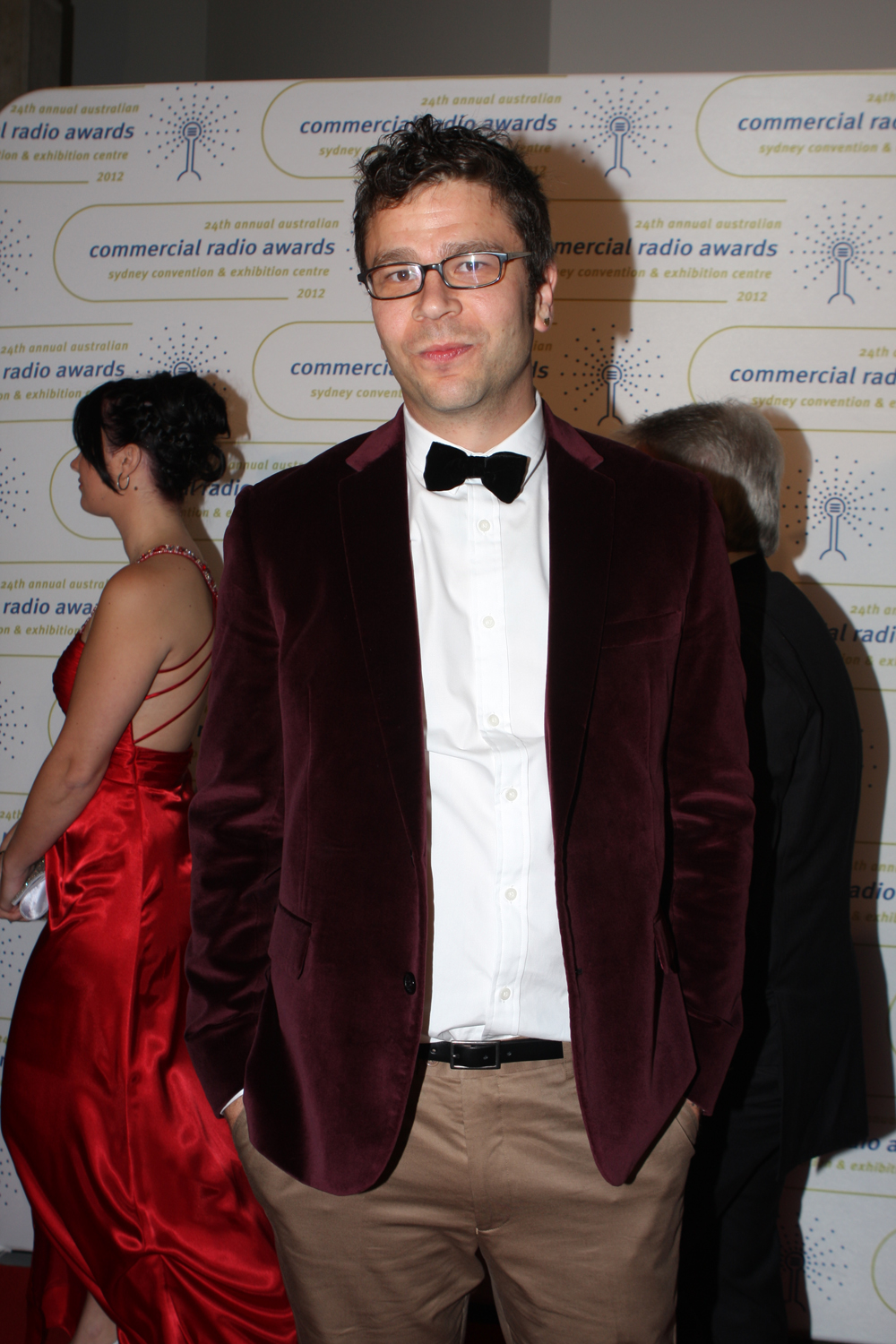
Dylan Lewis, winner of season 8 (2022)

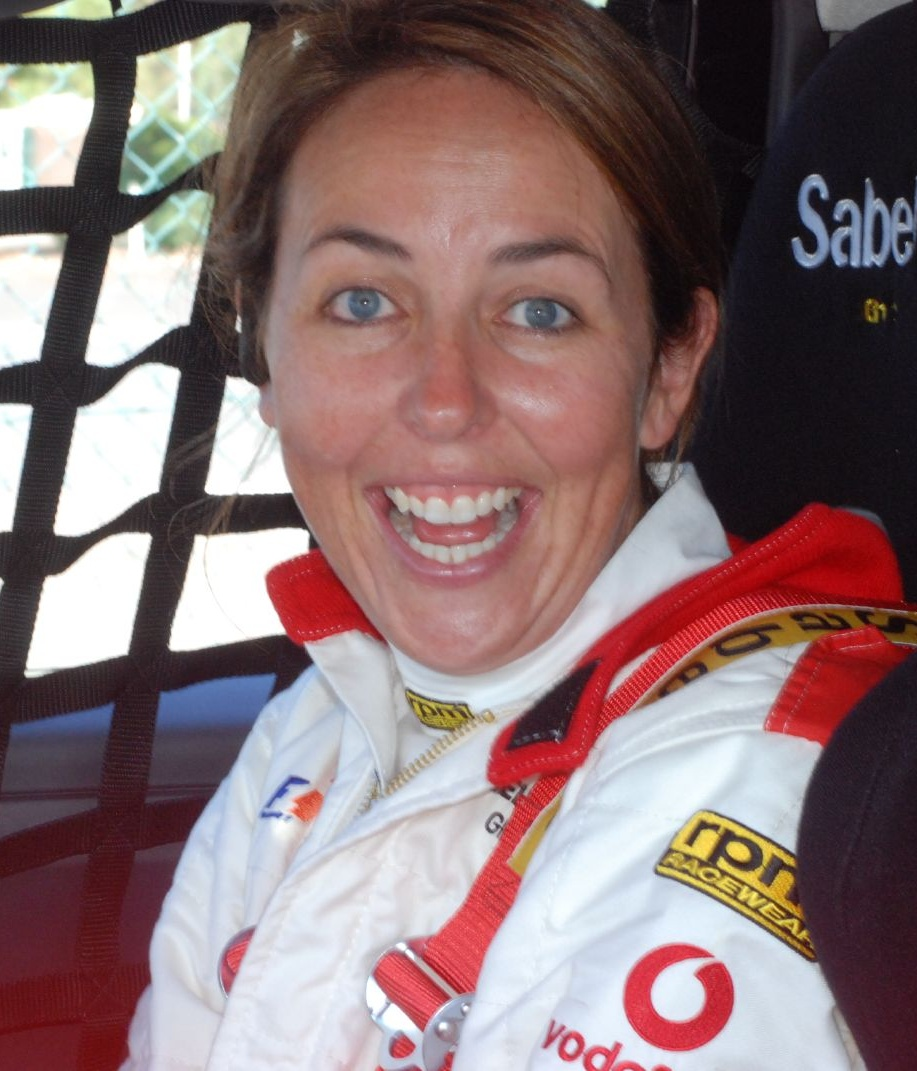
Liz Ellis, winner of season 9 (2023)

Series	Celebrity	Age	Notability	Status
1	Freddie Flintoff	37	Cricketer	1st – Winner
1	Barry Hall	37	Former AFL player	2nd – Runner-up
1	Chrissie Swan	41	TV & radio presenter	3rd – Third place
1	Maureen McCormick	58	The Brady Bunch Actress & Author	4th — Eliminated
1	Joel Creasey	24	Comedian	5th — Eliminated
1	Anna Heinrich	28	The Bachelor Australia star	6th — Eliminated
1	Julie Goodwin	44	Chef & cookbook author	7th — Eliminated
1	Merv Hughes	53	Cricketer	8th — Eliminated
1	Tyson Mayr	29	Model	9th — Eliminated
1	Andrew Daddo	48	TV & radio presenter	10th — Eliminated
1	Lauren Brant	26	Singer & TV presenter	11th — Eliminated
1	Laura Dundovic	28	Model & Miss Universe Australia 2008	12th — Eliminated
1	Tim Robards	31	The Bachelor Australia star	13th — Eliminated
1	Liesel Jones	29	Olympic swimmer	14th – Eliminated
2	Brendan Fevola	35	Former AFL player	1st – Winner
2	Paul Harragon	47	Former NRL player	2nd – Runner-up
2	Laurina Fleure	31	The Bachelor Australia 2 star	3rd – Third place
2	Anthony Callea	33	Singer	4th – Eliminated
2	Shane Warne	46	Cricketer	5th – Eliminated
2	Havana Brown	30	DJ	6th – Eliminated
2	Jo Beth Taylor	44	Actress, singer & TV presenter	7th – Eliminated
2	Val Lehman	72	Actress	8th – Eliminated
2	Dean Geyer	29	Actor & singer	9th – Eliminated
2	Bonnie Lythgoe	67	TV Personality	10th – Eliminated
2	Akmal Saleh	51	Comedian	11th – Eliminated
2	Courtney Hancock	27	Iron woman	12th – Eliminated
3	Casey Donovan	28	Singer-songwriter	1st – Winner
3	Dane Swan	33	AFL player	2nd – Runner-up
3	Natalie Bassingthwaighte	41	Singer & actress	3rd – Third place
3	Nazeem Hussain	31	Comedian & TV presenter	4th – Eliminated
3	Steve Price	62	TV & radio personality	5th – Eliminated
3	Lisa Curry	54	Olympic swimmer	6th – Eliminated
3	Ash Pollard	31	My Kitchen Rules Contestant	7th – Eliminated
3	Carson Kressley	47	Television personality	8th – Eliminated
3	Tegan Martin	24	Model & Miss Universe Australia 2014	9th – Eliminated
3	Keira Maguire	30	The Bachelor Australia 4 star	10th – Eliminated
3	Kris Smith	38	Model	11th – Eliminated
3	Tziporah Malkah	43	Former model	12th – Eliminated
3	Jay Laga'aia	53	Actor & singer	13th – Eliminated
3	Tom Arnold	57	Actor	14th – Eliminated
4	Fiona O'Loughlin	54	Comedian	1st – Winner
4	Shannon Noll	42	Singer-songwriter	2nd – Runner-up
4	Danny Green	44	Boxer	3rd – Third place
4	Vicky Pattison	30	TV & media personality	4th – Eliminated
4	Simone Holtznagel	24	Model	5th – Eliminated
4	Peter Rowsthorn	54	Comedian	6th – Eliminated
4	Jackie Gillies	37	Psychic & TV personality	7th – Eliminated
4	Josh Gibson	33	Former AFL player	8th – Eliminated
4	Paul Burrell	59	Former Royal Household butler	9th – Eliminated
4	Lisa Oldfield	43	The Real Housewives of Sydney star	10th – Eliminated
4	David Oldfield	59	Former politician	11th – Eliminated
4	Kerry Armstrong	59	Actress	12th – Eliminated
4	Tiffany Darwish	46	Singer-songwriter	13th – Eliminated
4	Anthony Mundine	42	Boxer	14th – Withdrew
4	Bernard Tomic	25	Tennis player	15th – Withdrew
5	Richard Reid	50	Studio 10 & Today gossip correspondent	1st – Winner
5	Yvie Jones	47	Former Gogglebox Australia star	2nd – Runner-up
5	Shane Crawford	45	Former AFL player & TV personality	3rd – Third place
5	Luke Jacobz	38	Actor & TV presenter	4th – Eliminated
5	Angie Kent	29	Former Gogglebox Australia star	5th — Eliminated
5	Justin Lacko	27	International Model & Love Island Australia contestant	6th — Eliminated
5	Natasha Exelby	31	Journalist & News reader	7th — Eliminated
5	Justine Schofield	33	MasterChef Australia contestant & TV presenter	8th — Eliminated
5	Tahir Bilgiç	48	Comedian & Pizza actor	9th — Eliminated
5	Dermott Brereton	54	Former AFL player	10th — Eliminated
5	Katherine Kelly Lang	57	The Bold and the Beautiful Actress	11th — Eliminated
5	Jacqui Lambie	47	Former politician	12th — Eliminated
5	Sam Dastyari	35	Former politician	13th — Eliminated
5	Ajay Rochester	49	Former The Biggest Loser presenter	14th — Eliminated
6	Miguel Maestre	40	Chef & TV presenter	1st – Winner
6	Dale Thomas	32	AFL player	2nd – Runner-up
6	Rhonda Burchmore	59	Singer & Actress	3rd – Third place
6	Cosentino	37	Illusionist & TV personality	4th — Eliminated
6	Charlotte Crosby	29	Former Geordie Shore star and TV & media personality	5th — Eliminated
6	Myf Warhurst	45	Australian TV & Radio personality	6th — Eliminated
6	Ryan Gallagher	31	Former Married at First Sight star	7th — Eliminated
6	Perez Hilton	41	Blogger, columnist & TV personality	8th — Eliminated
6	Tanya Hennessy	34	Australian YouTube Personality	9th — Eliminated
6	Tom Williams	49	Television presenter	10th — Eliminated
6	Erin Barnett	25	Former Love Island Australia contestant	11th — Eliminated
6	Billy Brownless	52	Retired AFL player and radio & TV presenter	12th — Eliminated
6	Nikki Osborne	38	Australian comedian	13th — Eliminated
6	Dilruk Jayasinha	34	Australian comedian	14th — Eliminated
7	Abbie Chatfield	24	Former The Bachelor Australia contestant	1st – Winner
7	Grant Denyer	43	TV presenter	2nd – Runner-up
7	Jess Eva	35	Television & radio personality	3rd – Third place
7	Toni Pearen	48	Actress & singer-songwriter	4th — Eliminated
7	Colin Fassnidge	47	Chef	5th — Eliminated
7	Travis Varcoe	32	Former AFL player	6th — Eliminated
7	Ash Williams	38	Comedian	7th — Eliminated
7	Robert "Dipper" DiPierdomenico	62	Former AFL player	8th — Eliminated
7	Adam Densten	30	Former Gogglebox Australia star	9th — Eliminated
7	Paulini Curuenavuli	38	Singer-songwriter	10th — Eliminated
7	Symon Lovett	33	Former Gogglebox Australia star	11th — Eliminated
7	Alli Simpson	22	Model, singer & actress	12th — Eliminated
7	Pettifleur Berenger	56	The Real Housewives of Melbourne star	13th — Eliminated
7	Jack Vidgen	23	Singer-songwriter	14th — Eliminated
7	Mel Buttle	38	Comedian & TV presenter	15th – Withdrew
8	Dylan Lewis	48	Television presenter, radio host & actor	1st – Winner
8	Brooke McClymont	40	Singer-songwriter	2nd – Runner-up
8	Nathan Buckley	49	Former AFL coach	3rd – Third place
8	Emily Seebohm	29	Olympic swimmer	4th – Eliminated
8	David Subritzky	26	Fake celebrity	5th – Eliminated
8	Joey Essex	31	The Only Way Is Essex star	6th – Eliminated
8	Poh Ling Yeow	48	Chef & TV presenter	7th – Eliminated
8	Cal Wilson	51	Comedian	8th – Eliminated
8	Tottie Goldsmith	59	Actress, singer, TV & radio host	9th – Eliminated
8	Derek Kickett	59	Former AFL player	10th — Eliminated
8	Maria Thattil	28	Model & Miss Universe Australia 2021	11th — Eliminated
8	Beau Ryan	36	Former NRL player & TV presenter	12th – Withdrew
8	Davina Rankin	29	Former Married at First Sight star	13th — Eliminated
9	Liz Ellis	50	Former netball player	1st – Winner
9	Harry Garside	25	Lightweight boxer	2nd – Runner-up
9	Aesha Scott	29	Below Deck star	3rd – Third place
9	Nathan Henry	32	Geordie Shore star	4th – Eliminated
9	Adam Cooney	37	Former AFL player	5th – Eliminated
9	Woody Whitelaw	35	Radio presenter	6th – Eliminated
9	Peter Helliar	47	Comedian & TV presenter	7th – Eliminated
9	Domenica "Dom" Calarco	30	Former Married at First Sight contestant	8th – Eliminated
9	Debra Lawrance	66	Actress	9th – Eliminated
9	Nick Cummins	35	Former rugby player & The Bachelor star	10th – Eliminated
9	Ian "Dicko" Dickson	60	Television personality	11th – Eliminated
9	Bianca Hunt	27	Television presenter	12th – Eliminated
9	Anna Polyviou	43	Chef & TV personality	13th – Eliminated
9	Kerri-Anne Kennerley	69	Television personality	14th – Withdrew
10	Skye Wheatley	30	Influencer & TV personality	1st – Winner
10	Tristan MacManus	41	Professional dancer & TV presenter	2nd – Runner-up
10	Callum Hole	26	Former Love Island Australia contestant	3rd – Third place
10	Brittany Hockley	36	Radio presenter and former The Bachelor star	4th – Eliminated
10	Ellie Cole	32	Paralympic swimmer	5th – Eliminated
10	Stephen K. Amos	56	Comedian	6th – Eliminated
10	Khanh Ong	30	Chef	7th – Eliminated
10	Peter Daicos	62	Former AFL player	8th – Eliminated
10	Michelle Bridges	53	The Biggest Loser trainer	9th – Eliminated
10	Frankie Muniz	38	Malcolm in the Middle actor	10th – Withdrew
10	Candice Warner	39	Ironwoman	11th – Eliminated
10	Denise Drysdale	75	TV personality	12th – Eliminated
11	Sam Thaiday	39	Former NRL player	1st – Winner
11	Matty Johnson	37	The Bachelor star	2nd – Runners-up
11	Reggie Sorensen	50	Big Brother winner	2nd – Runners-up
11	Max Balegde	26	TikTok star	4th – Eliminated
11	Geraldine Hickey	45	Comedian	5th – Eliminated
11	Harrison Reid	30	Bondi Rescue lifeguard	6th – Eliminated
11	Zach Tuohy	35	Former AFL player	7th – Eliminated
11	Dave Hughes	54	Comedian	8th – Eliminated
11	Tina Provis	28	Former Love Island Australia contestant	9th – Eliminated
11	Sigrid Thornton	65	Actor	10th – Eliminated
11	Shayna Jack	26	Olympic swimmer	11th – Eliminated
11	Nicky Buckley	59	Television presenter and model	12th – Eliminated
11	Samantha Moitzi	28	Former Married at First Sight contestant	13th – Eliminated
Barry Williams	The Brady Bunch star	Participating		
Concetta Caristo	Radio host	Participating		
Cyrell Paule	Married at First Sight contestant	Participating		
Dyson Heppell	Former AFL player	Participating		
Gary Sweet	Actor	Participating		
George Calombaris	Chef and restaurateur	Participating		
Luke Bateman	Former NRL player	Participating		
Matt Zukowski	Love Island Australia contestant	Participating		
Mia Fevola	Internet personality	Participating		
Nath Valvo	Stand-up comedian	Participating		
Rachel Hunter	Model	Participating		
Rebekah Elmaloglou	Actress	Participating		
Deni Hines	Singer	Withdrew on 27 January 2026		

|}

== International versions ==
Name	I'm a Celebrity... Australia history		I'm a Celebrity... International history			
Name	Series	Status	Country	Series	Season(s)	Status
Paul Burrell	Season 4 (2018)	Evicted – 9th place	Britain	I'm a Celebrity UK	Series 4 (2004)	Runner-up – 2nd place
Vicky Pattison	Season 4 (2018)	Evicted – 4th place	Britain	I'm a Celebrity UK	Series 15 (2015)	Winner – 1st place
Joey Essex	Season 8 (2022)	Evicted – 6th place	Britain	I'm a Celebrity UK	Series 13 (2013)	Evicted – 4th place
