= Alli Simpson =

Australian singer-songwriter and television personality (born 1998)

- Born: Alli Simpson; 24 April 1998 (age 28); Gold Coast, Queensland, Australia
- Occupations: Singer-songwriter; actress; radio host; television personality; author
- Years active: 2010–present
- Television: Filthy Rich And Homeless; I'm a Celebrity...Get Me Out of Here!; The Masked Singer Australia; The Amazing Race Australia
- Relatives: Cody Simpson (brother)
- Musical career
- Genre: Pop
- Instrument: Vocals
- Label: So Alli Records

Alli Simpson (born 24 April 1998) is an Australian singer-songwriter, actress, radio host, television personality and author. Simpson has 1.2 million followers on Instagram and half a million subscribers on YouTube. She is the younger sister of Australian singer and swimmer Cody Simpson.

== Early life ==
Simpson was born in 1998 on the Gold Coast, Queensland. She has two brothers, including Cody.

At the age of 12, she and her family moved to the United States so her brother could pursue his music career. While living in the US, Simpson got a job in national radio, released some music and filmed a movie. However, in 2018, she and her family moved back to Australia.

== Career ==
In 2012, Simpson filmed her first movie in the United States, 12 Dogs Of Christmas: Great Puppy Rescue. She appeared as a character named Alli in the TV series Hacking High School in 2017. Her second movie in the US, Death Link, was released in 2021.

In 2013, she released two singles, "Notice Me" and "Why I'm Single", and went on to release more music until 2018. In September 2021, she revealed that she had plans to release more music.

In 2018, Simpson appeared in season 2 of the Special Broadcasting Service (SBS) documentary series Filthy Rich and Homeless.

Simpson appeared as a contestant on the seventh season of I'm a Celebrity…Get Me Out Of Here! Australia which premiered in January 2021. She was the third contestant to be eliminated. Later that year, Simpson competed in the third season of The Masked Singer Australia as "Lightning" and made it to the final six.

She presented the Alli Simpson Show on Radio Disney from 2015, becoming the youngest host of a nationally syndicated show in the United States.

In 2020, Simpson co-authored the children's book Clouds: Life's Big & Little Moments (ISBN 1534439536) with her mother, Angie Simpson.

In 2023, Simpson competed on the seventh season of The Amazing Race Australia with her mother, Angie Simpson.

== Personal life ==
In January 2022, Simpson hit her head in a shallow diving pool. She was sent to a hospital with a fractured neck. This required her to wear a neck brace for the next four months.

== Filmography ==
Film name	Character	Year
12 Dogs of Christmas: Great Puppy Rescue	Alli	2012
Hacking High School	Alli	2017
Filthy Rich and Homeless	Herself	2018
I'm A Celebrity... Get Me Out Of Here!	Herself	2021
Death Link	Beth	2021
The Masked Singer Australia	Lightning	2021
The Amazing Race Australia	Herself	2023

== Discography ==
Singles
Title	Year
"Notice Me"	2013
"Why I'm Single"	2013
"Guilty"	2014
"Roll 'em Up"	2015
"I Won't Remember You Tomorrow"	2017
"Material Boy"	2017
"RICHER"	2018
