= I'm a Celebrity...Get Me Out of Here! (Australian TV series) season 7 =

I'm a Celebrity...Get Me Out of Here!
- Season 7
- Presented by: Chris Brown; Julia Morris
- No. of days: 20
- No. of contestants: 15
- Winner: Abbie Chatfield
- Runner-up: Grant Denyer
- Location: Dungay, New South Wales, Australia
- No. of episodes: 21

Release
- Original network: Network 10
- Original release: 3 January – 31 January 2021

Additional information
- Filming dates: 17 November – 6 December 2020

Series chronology
- ← Previous; Season 6 Next → Season 8

The seventh season of I'm a Celebrity...Get Me Out of Here was commissioned by Network 10 in May 2020. It launched on 3 January 2021 and was hosted by Julia Morris and Chris Brown. The season was the first to be pre-recorded and filmed in Australia, instead of its usual production location in South Africa, as a result of the COVID-19 pandemic. Filming occurred over four weeks in November and December 2020, with a live grand finale airing on 31 January 2021.

== Teaser ==
The first teaser trailer was released on 4 November 2020. A second trailer, featuring hosts Chris Brown and Julia Morris in a variety of Australian movie parodies, was released on 13 November 2020.

== Celebrities ==
Celebrity chef and former My Kitchen Rules judge Pete Evans was intended to be a contestant, but was dropped from the show following controversial social media posts, including one that featured the neo-Nazi symbol known as the Black Sun.

Celebrity	Known for	Status	Source
Abbie Chatfield	Former The Bachelor Australia contestant	Winner on 31 January 2021	
Grant Denyer	Television presenter	Runner up on 31 January 2021	
Jess Eva	Former The Block contestant & radio presenter	Third place on 31 January 2021	
Toni Pearen	Actress & singer-songwriter	Eliminated 11th on 31 January 2021	
Colin Fassnidge	Chef	Eliminated 10th on 31 January 2021	
Travis Varcoe	Former AFL player	Eliminated 9th on 31 January 2021	
Ash Williams	Comedian	Eliminated 8th on 31 January 2021	
Robert DiPierdomenico	Former AFL player	Eliminated 7th on 28 January 2021	
Adam Densten	Former Gogglebox Australia star	Eliminated 6th on 28 January 2021	
Paulini	Singer-songwriter	Eliminated 5th on 27 January 2021	
Symon Lovett	Former Gogglebox Australia star	Eliminated 4th on 26 January 2021	
Alli Simpson	Model, singer & actress	Eliminated 3rd on 25 January 2021	
Pettifleur Berenger	The Real Housewives of Melbourne star	Eliminated 2nd on 24 January 2021	
Jack Vidgen	Singer-songwriter	Eliminated 1st on 17 January 2021	
Mel Buttle	Comedian & television presenter	Withdrew on 6 January 2021	

=== Celebrity guests ===
Ep	Celebrity	Known for	Reason of visit	Ref
1	Miguel Maestre	Chef & The Living Room presenter	Facilitating King Miguel's Kitchen tucker trial	
5	Glenn Robbins as Russell Coight	Comedian	Sharing tips with Chris & Julia about surviving the bush	

== Results and elimination ==
Indicates that the celebrity received the most votes from the public
Indicates that the celebrity was immune from the elimination challenge
Indicates that the celebrity was named as being in the bottom 2 or 3.
Indicates that the celebrity came last in a challenge and was evicted immediately (no bottom three)
Indicates that the celebrity withdrew from the competition

Elimination results per celebrity
Celebrity	Week 1	Week 3	Week 4					Grand Finale		Number of Trials
Celebrity	Week 1	Week 3	Day 16	Day 17	Day 18	Day 19	Day 20	Grand Finale		Number of Trials
Abbie	N/A	Safe	Safe	Safe	Safe	Safe	Bottom 3	Winner (Day 21)		7
Grant	N/A	Safe	Safe	Safe	Safe	Safe	Safe	Runner-up (Day 21)		6
Jess	N/A	Safe	Safe	Safe	Safe	Safe	Safe	Third Place (Day 21)		7
Toni	N/A	Safe	Safe	Safe	Safe	Safe	Safe	4th	Eliminated (Day 21)	7
Colin	N/A	Safe	Safe	Bottom 3	Safe	Safe	Safe	5th	Eliminated (Day 21)	7
Travis	N/A	Bottom 3	Safe	Safe	Safe	Safe	Safe	6th	Eliminated (Day 21)	6
Ash	N/A	Bottom 3	Bottom 3	Safe	Bottom 3	Bottom 3	Safe	7th	Eliminated (Day 21)	6
Dipper	N/A	Safe	Safe	Bottom 3	Safe	Safe	Bottom 3	Eliminated (Day 20)		6
Adam	Not in Camp		Safe	Safe	Bottom 3	Bottom 3	Bottom 3	Eliminated (Day 20)		4
Paulini	N/A	Safe	Safe	Safe	Safe	Bottom 3	Eliminated (Day 19)			4
Symon	Not in Camp		Safe	Safe	Bottom 3	Eliminated (Day 18)				2
Alli	Not in Camp	Immune	Bottom 3	Bottom 3	Eliminated (Day 17)					3
Pettifleur	N/A	Safe	Bottom 3	Eliminated (Day 16)						3
Jack	N/A	Bottom 3	Eliminated (Day 11)							4
Mel	Withdrew (Day 4)									1
Withdrew	Mel	None								
Bottom three	N/A	Travis Jack Ash	Alli Ash Pettifleur	Colin Dipper Alli	Ash Symon Adam	Adam Paulini Ash	Dipper Adam Abbie	None		
Eliminated	N/A	Jack; Lost elimination challenge	Pettifleur; Lost elimination challenge	Alli; Lost elimination challenge	Symon; Lost elimination challenge	Paulini; Lost elimination challenge	Adam; Lost elimination challenge	Ash; Fewest votes to win	Jess; Fewer votes to win	
Eliminated	N/A	Jack; Lost elimination challenge	Pettifleur; Lost elimination challenge	Alli; Lost elimination challenge	Symon; Lost elimination challenge	Paulini; Lost elimination challenge	Adam; Lost elimination challenge	Travis; Fewer votes to win	Grant; Fewer votes to win	
Eliminated	N/A	Jack; Lost elimination challenge	Pettifleur; Lost elimination challenge	Alli; Lost elimination challenge	Symon; Lost elimination challenge	Paulini; Lost elimination challenge	Dipper; Lost elimination challenge	Colin; Fewer votes to win	Abbie; Most votes to win	
Eliminated	N/A	Jack; Lost elimination challenge	Pettifleur; Lost elimination challenge	Alli; Lost elimination challenge	Symon; Lost elimination challenge	Paulini; Lost elimination challenge	Dipper; Lost elimination challenge	Toni; Fewer votes to win	Abbie; Most votes to win	

== Tucker Trials ==
The contestants take part in daily trials to earn food. These trials aim to test both physical and mental abilities. Success is usually determined by the number of stars collected during the trial, with each star representing a meal earned by the winning contestant for their camp mates.

The trial was compulsory and the celebrities did not decide who took part
The contestants were chosen by the evicted celebrities
The voting for the trial was of dual origin

Trial number	Airdate	Name of trial	Celebrity participation	Number of stars/Winner(s)	Notes	Source
1	3 January	King Miguel's Kitchen	Grant, Toni & Mel	Mel	None	
2	3 January	Unhappy Hour	Abbie, Ash & Travis	Abbie	None	
3	4 January	The Hungry Games: Dip Sticks	Jack & Abbie	5/5 stars	None	
3	4 January	The Hungry Games: Dip Sticks	Paulini & Grant	4/5 stars	None	
3	4 January	The Hungry Games: Dip Sticks	Jess & Travis	5/5 stars	None	
4	5 January	The Hungry Games: Hellraiser	Toni, Dipper & Ash	Dipper	None	
5	6 January	The Hungry Games: Candy Shop of Horrors	Pettifleur, Jess & Jack	Jack	None	
6	7 January	The Hungry Games: It's a Long Way to the Top If You Wanna Sausage Roll	Colin, Travis & Paulini	Travis	None	
7	10 January	Celebrity Boxing	Everyone	9/11 stars	None	
8	11 January	Vertigo	Toni	11/11 stars	None	
9	12 January	Hellevator	Alli	10/12 stars	1	
10	13 January	Deli Belly	Colin, Abbie & Ash	12/12 stars	None	
11	14 January	Ice Ice Baby!	Pettifleur, Grant, Jack & Travis	7/12 stars	None	
12	17 January	Wired Wedding	Toni, Dipper, Colin, Alli & Jess	10/12 stars	None	
13	18 January	Crude Oil	Adam & Symon	7/13 stars	2	
14	19 January	Camp Calamity	Jess & Ash	7/13 stars	None	
15	20 January	Casinooo	Toni, Paulini & Dipper	13/13 stars	None	
16	21 January	A Land Down Under	Alli & Colin	13/13 stars	None	
17	24 January	Viper Room	Grant	13/13 stars	None	
18	25 January	Smell-o-vision	Adam, Jess & Colin	12/12 stars	None	
19	26 January	Sushi Bowl	Symon, Dipper & Grant	11/11 stars	None	
20	27 January	Memory Pain	Adam & Abbie	8/10 stars	3	
21	28 January	A Spin Cycle	Everyone	9/9 stars	4	

Notes

- ^1 Alli was automatically placed in the Hellevator trial as she was an intruder.
- ^2 Adam and Symon, as intruders, had to complete the Crude Oil trial as part of their entry into the camp.
- ^3 Adam and Abbie won 7 stars, although Abbie was offered a bonus star if she was able to remember all the images on the memorisation board. She correctly named all the items and won the star.
- ^4 The celebrities won 3 stars but Dr Chris Brown offered to participate in the trial to win them the full slate of stars as it was the camp's final night.

=== Star count ===
Celebrity	Number of stars earned	Percentage
Abbie Chatfield	43/47 stars	89.5%
Adam Densten	36/44 stars	81.8̅1̅%
Alli Simpson	33/37 stars	89.1̅8̅9̅%
Ash Williams	37/45 stars	82.2̅%
Colin Fassnidge	65/70 stars	92.85%
Grant Denyer	53/61 stars	86.88%
Jack Vidgen	21/28 stars	75%
Jess Eva	52/65 stars	80%
Mel Buttle	—N/a	—N/a
Paulini	35/38 stars	92.1%
Pettifleur Berenger	16/23 stars	69.5%
Robert "Dipper" DiPierdomenico	52/56 stars	92.85%
Symon Lovett	18/24 stars	75%
Toni Pearen	52/56 stars	92.85%
Travis Varcoe	30/37 stars	81.0̅8̅1̅%

== Secret Missions ==
This is a challenge in which celebrities have to take part in without alerting the other celebrities to what they are doing. If they are successful in the 'mission', they are rewarded.

=== Grant's Secret Mission: Quiet as a Mouse ===
Grant had to dress up as a mouse and wear squeaky shoes while carrying a cheese platter to his bed in camp. If he could avoid the camp's suspicions, by keeping his squeaking quiet, he would be allowed to eat the cheese, biscuits and grapes on the platter.

=== Dipper's Secret Mission: Makeup for Spices ===
Dipper was given a series of tasks from the Tok Tokkie. The tasks involved wearing makeup and interacting with the other campmates without getting caught to win spices.

1. Blush — Offering a campmate a cup of tea
2. Eyeshadow — Hugging another campmate
3. Lipstick — Interact with three different campmates

Dipper failed his first mission, after Abbie noticed his blush, meaning the camp didn't win chilli. He remained undetected in the second and third missions, winning mixed herbs and salt & pepper for his campmates.

=== Jess' Secret Mission: Secret Cave ===
Jess had to recruit a campmate and find the entrance to a secret cave which could be opened using the code words "open sesame seeds" without being noticed or followed. Jess chose Travis and when they entered the cave, they found two cheeseburgers. After eating the burgers, they found out they had to recruit a third campmate, so they chose Toni and found french fries when they returned to the cave. The reward for winning the mission were delivered McDonald's meals for lunch.

=== Alli's Secret Mission: Secret Selfie ===
In episode 12, Alli was given a phone in the Tok Tokki and had to take one selfie with each of her campmates without them noticing. She succeeded in the challenge and won cups of hot chocolate for the camp.

=== Toni's Secret Mission: News Headlines ===
In episode 15, Toni was given a number of newspaper headlines and had to make them happen. They included accusing Jess of farting, telling a boring story to at least three people and burning Abbie's sock. As a reward for completing the mission, she won popcorn, butter and salt for the camp.

== Team Captains ==
Celebrity				Original Run		No. of days as Blue Team Captain	No. of days as Red Team Captain	No. of days as Green Team Captain
	Blue Team Captain	Red Team Captain	Green Team Captain	First day	Last day	No. of days as Blue Team Captain	No. of days as Red Team Captain	No. of days as Green Team Captain
1	Paulini	Jess Eva	Jack Vidgen	1	5	5		

== Ratings ==
I'm a Celebrity...Get Met Out of Here! (season 7) overnight ratings, with metropolitan viewership and nightly position
Week	Episode		Original airdate	Timeslot (approx.)	Viewers (millions)^{[a]}	Nightly rank^{[a]}	Source
1	1	"Opening Night"	3 January 2021	Sunday 7:30 pm	1.031	1	
1	1	"Welcome to the Jungle"	3 January 2021	Sunday 7:30 pm	0.914	2	
1	2	"Episode 2"	4 January 2021	Monday 7:30 pm	0.820	5	
1	3	"Episode 3"	5 January 2021	Tuesday 7:30 pm	0.752	5	
1	4	"Episode 4"	6 January 2021	Wednesday 7:30 pm	0.720	5	
1	5	"Episode 5"	7 January 2021	Thursday 7:30 pm	0.678	6	
2	6	"Episode 6"	10 January 2021	Sunday 7:30 pm	0.744	6	
2	7	"Episode 7"	11 January 2021	Monday 7:30 pm	0.729	6	
2	8	"Episode 8"	12 January 2021	Tuesday 7:30 pm	0.678	5	
2	9	"Episode 9"	13 January 2021	Wednesday 7:30 pm	0.678	5	
2	10	"Episode 10"	14 January 2021	Thursday 7:30 pm	0.702	5	
3	11	"Episode 11"	17 January 2021	Sunday 7:30 pm	0.780	4	
3	11	"Episode 11: Eviction"	17 January 2021	Sunday 7:30 pm	0.816	2	
3	12	"Episode 12"	18 January 2021	Monday 7:30 pm	0.746	5	
3	13	"Episode 13"	19 January 2021	Tuesday 7:30 pm	0.706	5	
3	14	"Episode 14"	20 January 2021	Wednesday 7:30 pm	0.685	5	
3	15	"Episode 15"	21 January 2021	Thursday 7:30 pm	0.630	5	
4	16	"Episode 16"	24 January 2021	Sunday 7:30 pm	0.649	3	
4	16	"Episode 16: Eviction"	24 January 2021	Sunday 7:30 pm	0.605	4	
4	17	"Episode 17"	25 January 2021	Monday 7:30 pm	0.709	6	
4	17	"Episode 17: Eviction"	25 January 2021	Monday 7:30 pm	0.678	7	
4	18	"Episode 18"	26 January 2021	Tuesday 7:30 pm	0.658	6	
4	18	"Episode 18: Eviction"	26 January 2021	Tuesday 7:30 pm	0.631	7	
4	19	"Episode 19"	27 January 2021	Wednesday 7:30 pm	0.731	6	
4	19	"Episode 19: Eviction"	27 January 2021	Wednesday 7:30 pm	0.719	7	
4	20	"Episode 20"	28 January 2021	Thursday 7:30 pm	0.725	6	
4	20	"Episode 20: Eviction"	28 January 2021	Thursday 7:30 pm	0.762	5	
5	21	"Finale"	31 January 2021	Sunday 7:30 pm	0.784	5	
5	21	"Winner Announced"	31 January 2021	Sunday 7:30 pm	0.896	2	

- ^{a} Ratings data is from OzTAM and represents the live and same day average viewership from the 5 largest Australian metropolitan centres (Sydney, Melbourne, Brisbane, Perth and Adelaide).
