= Bianca Hunt =

Australian television presenter

- Born: 1995 or 1996 (age 30–31); Brisbane, Queensland, Australia
- Education: Queensland University of Technology (BBus (Major) and BCI (Major))
- Occupations: Television presenter, talent agent
- Television: Yokayi Footy; Going Places with Ernie Dingo; I'm a Celebrity...Get Me Out of Here!

Bianca Hunt is an Australian television presenter and talent agent.

Hunt is a Kamilaroi, Barkindji, Ballardong and Whadjuk woman. She is most notable for her work on Indigenous Australian television network NITV where she has been a co-host on Yokayi Footy with Tony Armstrong and Darryl White as well as a travel reporter on Going Places with Ernie Dingo.

In 2020, Hunt hosted an online health and fitness series for children called Healthy Kicks which was an initiative launched between the AFL and Coles Supermarkets.

In 2021, Hunt established a talent agency for First Nations people called Agnt Blak.

Hunt was one of the celebrities to compete in the 2023 season of I'm a Celebrity...Get Me Out of Here! where she represented the charity Indigenous Literacy Foundation. Hunt was eliminated second on 16 April 2023.
