= I'm a Celebrity...Get Me Out of Here! (Australian TV series) season 10 =

I'm a Celebrity...Get Me Out of Here!
- Season 10
- Presented by: Julia Morris; Robert Irwin
- No. of days: 30
- No. of contestants: 12
- Winner: Skye Wheatley
- Runner-up: Tristan MacManus
- Location: Kruger National Park, South Africa
- No. of episodes: 21

Release
- Original network: Network 10
- Original release: 24 March – 21 April 2024

Series chronology
- ← Previous; Season 9 Next → Season 11

The tenth season of I'm a Celebrity...Get Me Out of Here! was commissioned by Network 10 in October 2023. Alongside Julia Morris, this season is the first to be hosted by Robert Irwin, as previous host Chris Brown joined the Seven Network in July 2023. It premiered on 24 March 2024.

== Teaser ==
The first teaser trailer, featuring hosts Julia Morris and Robert Irwin in a 90s host auditions themed promo, was released on 29 January 2024.

== Celebrities ==
On 20 March 2024, the first contestant was revealed by Network 10, prior to the premiere of the first episode, to be radio presenter and former reality television contestant Brittany Hockley. On 24 March 2024, hours prior to the premiere, two more celebrities were revealed as Australian rules football player Peter Daicos and Malcolm in the Middle star Frankie Muniz.

Celebrity	Known for	Status	Source
Skye Wheatley	Influencer & Big Brother 11 finalist	Winner on 21 April 2024	
Tristan MacManus	Professional dancer & Studio 10 presenter	Runner up on 21 April 2024	
Callum Hole	Love Island Australia 4 finalist	Third place on 21 April 2024	
Brittany Hockley	TV personality and radio host	Eliminated 8th on 18 April 2024	
Ellie Cole	Paralympic swimmer	Eliminated 7th on 18 April 2024	
Stephen K. Amos	Stand-up comedian	Eliminated 6th on 17 April 2024	
Khanh Ong	Celebrity chef	Eliminated 5th on 16 April 2024	
Peter Daicos	Former AFL player	Eliminated 4th on 15 April 2024	
Michelle Bridges	Former The Biggest Loser trainer	Eliminated 3rd on 14 April 2024	
Frankie Muniz	Malcolm in the Middle actor	Withdrew on 14 April 2024	
Candice Warner	Iron woman	Eliminated 2nd on 11 April 2024	
Denise Drysdale	TV personality	Eliminated 1st on 10 April 2024	

=== Celebrity guests ===
Ep	Celebrity	Known for	Reason of visit	Ref
21	Sandra Sully	10 News First presenter	Updated celebrities on world news	

== Results and elimination ==
Indicates that the celebrity received the most votes from the public
Indicates that the celebrity was immune from the elimination challenge
Indicates that the celebrity was named as being in the bottom 2 or 3.
Indicates that the celebrity came last in a challenge or received the fewest votes and was evicted immediately (no bottom three)
Indicates that the celebrity withdrew from the competition

Elimination results per celebrity
Celebrity	Week 3		Week 4					Grand Finale	Number of Trials
Celebrity	Day 19	Day 20	Day 23	Day 24	Day 25	Day 26	Day 27	Grand Finale	Number of Trials
Skye	Safe	Safe	Safe	Safe	Safe	Bottom 3	Safe	Winner (Day 30)	10
Tristan	Safe	Safe	Safe	Bottom 3	Safe	Bottom 3	Safe	Runner-up (Day 30)	7
Callum	Safe	Safe	Safe	Safe	Bottom 3	Safe	Safe	Third Place (Day 30)	9
Brittany	Safe	Safe	Safe	Safe	Safe	Safe	4th	Eliminated (Day 27)	6
Ellie	Bottom 3	Safe	Bottom 3	Safe	Bottom 3	Safe	5th	Eliminated (Day 27)	5
Stephen	Safe	Bottom 3	Bottom 3	Bottom 3	Safe	Bottom 3	Eliminated (Day 26)		5
Khanh	Safe	Safe	Safe	Safe	Bottom 3	Eliminated (Day 25)			3
Peter	Safe	Bottom 3	Safe	Bottom 3	Eliminated (Day 24)				2
Michelle	Safe	Safe	Bottom 3	Eliminated (Day 23)					3
Frankie	Safe	Safe	Withdrew (Day 21)						4
Candice	Bottom 3	Bottom 3	Eliminated (Day 20)						5
Denise	Bottom 3	Eliminated (Day 19)							1
Withdrew	None		Frankie	None			None		
Bottom two/three	Candice Denise Ellie	Candice Peter Stephen	Ellie Michelle Stephen	Peter Stephen Tristan	Callum Ellie Khanh	Skye Stephen Tristan	None		
Eliminated	Denise; Fewest votes to save	Candice; Fewest votes to save	Michelle; Fewest votes to save	Peter; Fewest votes to save	Khanh; Fewest votes to save	Stephen; Fewest votes to save	Brittany; Fewest votes to save	Callum; Fewest votes to win	
Eliminated	Denise; Fewest votes to save	Candice; Fewest votes to save	Michelle; Fewest votes to save	Peter; Fewest votes to save	Khanh; Fewest votes to save	Stephen; Fewest votes to save	Brittany; Fewest votes to save	Tristan; Fewer votes to win	
Eliminated	Denise; Fewest votes to save	Candice; Fewest votes to save	Michelle; Fewest votes to save	Peter; Fewest votes to save	Khanh; Fewest votes to save	Stephen; Fewest votes to save	Ellie; Fewer votes to save	Tristan; Fewer votes to win	
Eliminated	Denise; Fewest votes to save	Candice; Fewest votes to save	Michelle; Fewest votes to save	Peter; Fewest votes to save	Khanh; Fewest votes to save	Stephen; Fewest votes to save	Ellie; Fewer votes to save	Skye; Most votes to win	

== Tucker trials ==
The contestants take part in daily trials to earn food. These trials aim to test both physical and mental abilities. Success is usually determined by the number of stars collected during the trial, with each star representing a meal earned by the winning contestant for their camp mates.

The public voted for who they wanted to face the trial
The contestants decided who did which trial
The trial was compulsory and neither the public nor celebrities decided who took part
The contestants were chosen by the evicted celebrities
The voting for the trial was of dual origin

Trial number	Airdate	Name of trial	Celebrity participation	Number of stars/Winner(s)	Notes	Source
1	24 March	Jungle Cruise	Ellie, Frankie & Tristan	4/6 stars	None	
2	24 March	Jungle Cruise	Candice, Skye & Stephen	5/5 stars	None	
3	25 March	Jungle Shop of Horrors	Candice & Khanh	9/11 stars	None	
4	26 March	The Unsureshank Redemption	Skye	11/11 stars	None	
5	27 March	Knock'n'Roll	Callum, Skye, Frankie & Brittany	5/12 stars	None	
6	28 March	Stamp Duty	Callum, Michelle & Skye	6/12 stars	None	
7	31 March	Escape from Bunny Bunker	Callum	10/11 stars	1	
8	1 April	Tip Top	Candice & Stephen vs. Frankie & Skye	Frankie & Skye (Team Robert)	2	
9	2 April	Vom-Appetit	Denise, Peter & Tristan vs. Callum, Ellie & Khanh	Callum, Ellie & Khanh (Team Robert)	3, 4	
10	3 April	Extreme Bingo	Michelle vs. Callum	Callum (Team Robert)	5	
11	4 April	Day Spa-Ah	Candice & Tristan vs. Brittany & Skye	Candice & Tristan (Team Julia)	6	
12	7 April	The Viper Room	Skye	12/12 stars	None	
13	8 April	The Deep Freeze	Brittany & Candice	12/12 stars	None	
14	9 April	Shafted	Ellie & Peter	12/12 stars	None	
15	10 April	Get Ready To Crumble	Stephen & Tristan	10/12 stars	None	
16	11 April	Hole in One Mouthful	Callum, Frankie & Michelle	11/11 stars	None	
17	14 April	Stinking Ship 2: Stink Harder!	Khanh	10/10 stars	None	
18	15 April	Highway to Hell Holes	Ellie & Stephen	8/8 stars	None	
19	16 April	Sick-Nic	Brittany, Skye & Tristan	6/7 stars	None	
20	17 April	The Worst Sports Carnival Ever	Brittany, Callum & Stephen	5.5/6 stars	None	
21	18 April	Knights in Shining Armour	Everyone	3.5/5 stars	None	
22	21 April	Wheels of Misfortune	Everyone and their families	3/6 stars	None	

=== Notes ===
- ^1 At the start of Week 2, the celebrities were divided into two teams: Team Julia (Candice, Michelle, Peter, Stephen, and Tristan) and Team Robert (Brittany, Callum, Ellie, Frankie, Khanh, and Skye). The teams then competed for their food earned for the trial, while the losers would eat rice and beans. Team Robert won the challenge.
- ^2 The public voted for two members of each team to go head-to-head for this trial. Frankie and Skye won the trial for Team Robert.
- ^3 Denise, as an intruder, had to participate with Peter & Tristan in the Vom-Appetit trial as part of her entry into the camp.
- ^4 The public voted for three members of each team (two members for Team Julia) to go head-to-head for this trial. Callum, Ellie, & Khanh won the trial for Team Robert.
- ^5 The public voted for one member of each team to go head-to-head for this trial. Callum won the trial for Team Robert.
- ^6 The public voted for two members of each team to go head-to-head for this trial. Candice & Tristan won the trial for Team Julia.

=== Star count ===
Celebrity	Number of stars earned	Percentage
Brittany	28/33 stars	84%
Callum	41/54 stars	76%
Candice	26/28 stars	93%
Ellie	27.5/31 stars	89%
Frankie	17/20 stars	85%
Khanh	19/21 stars	90%
Michelle	17/23 stars	74%
Peter	12/12 stars	100%
Skye	46.5/61 stars	76%
Stephen	30.5/33 stars	92%
Tristan	26.5/36 stars	74%

== Head-to-head challenges ==
During the team phase of the game: Team Julia (Candice, Denise, Michelle, Peter, Stephen, and Tristan) vs. Team Robert (Brittany, Callum, Ellie, Frankie, Khanh, and Skye), competed for additional food.

Episode	Date	Winners	Prize
6	31 March	Team Robert	Food earned from trial
8	2 April	Team Robert	Eggs
8	2 April	Team Robert	Cake
9	3 April	Team Julia	Cocktails, Champagne, Beer, & Soft Drinks
9	3 April	Team Robert	Cocktails, Champagne, Beer, & Soft Drinks

== People Who Politely Turned Us Down ==
At the end of certain episodes, eliminated celebrities played for a chance to earn one of three items for their fellow campmates.

Episode	Date	Name	Eliminated Celebrity	Prize(s)
14	10 April	Britney's Spears	Denise	Spearmint lollie for each campmate
14	10 April	Britney's Spears	Denise	Sprig of mint
14	10 April	Britney's Spears	Denise	Blob of spearmint toothpaste
15	11 April	Camilla's Parkerbowls	Candice	Shortbread biscuit
15	11 April	Camilla's Parkerbowls	Candice	Cucumber sandwich
15	11 April	Camilla's Parkerbowls	Candice	Single use teabag

== Secret missions ==
=== Stephen's secret mission: Scare fellow campmates ===
On Day 5, Stephen was given a secret mission to scare his fellow campmates. If successful, the camp would earn luxury items. Stephen failed the task. Later that night, the campmates were given another chance to earn their luxury items, by having at least one celebrity eat a scorpion. They passed the task, and thus earned their luxury items.

=== Denise's secret mission: Metal pants ===
On Day 10, Denise (with the help of Tristan) was given a secret mission to use a specially designed pair of pants containing strong magnets to retrieve five different metal items without her fellow campmates noticing. If successful, Denise would receive her luxury item. Denise passed the task, and thus earned her luxury item.

=== Ellie and Frankie's secret mission: Prank Peter ===
On Day 11, Ellie and Frankie were given a secret mission to prank Peter. In order to pass the mission, every celebrity except Peter, must clip a clothes peg on Peter, without him noticing. If successful, they'd earn coffee for the camp. They passed the task, and thus earned coffee for the camp.

=== Khanh's secret mission: Squeaky piggy slippers ===
On Day 15, Khanh was given bacon-flavored chips. To receive them, he had to sneak the chips into camp, wearing squeaky pig slippers, all while his fellow campmates were asleep.

=== Tristan's secret mission: Big Mac chant ===
On Day 16, Tristan was given a secret mission to make his fellow campmates say words from the 'Big Mac' chant. If successful, Tristan would win Big Macs for the whole camp. Tristan passed the task, and thus earned Big Macs for the camp.

=== Candice's secret mission: Fake news into real news ===
On Day 17, Candice was given a secret mission to make a fake news headline come to life. She was tasked to make one campmate's pillow disappear without being detected. If successful, Candice would earn popcorn, butter, and salt for the camp. Candice decided to hide her own pillow, and passed the task. Thus, winning the whole camp popcorn, butter, and salt.

== Ratings ==
I'm a Celebrity...Get Me Out of Here! (season 10) National Reach and National Total ratings with nightly position
Week	Episode		Original airdate	Timeslot (approx.)	National Reach Viewers (millions)^{[a]}	National Total Viewers (millions)^{[a]}	Nightly rank^{[a]}	Source
1	1	"Opening Night"	24 March 2024	Sunday 7:30 pm	1.813	0.806	6	
1	2	"Episode 2"	25 March 2024	Monday 7:30 pm	1.277	0.565	10	
1	3	"Episode 3"	26 March 2024	Tuesday 7:30 pm	1.439	0.654	6	
1	4	"Episode 4"	27 March 2024	Wednesday 7:30 pm	1.282	0.581	6	
1	5	"Episode 5"	28 March 2024	Thursday 7:30 pm	1.059	0.466	6	
2	6	"Episode 6"	31 March 2024	Sunday 7:30 pm	1.077	0.491	8	
2	7	"Episode 7"	1 April 2024	Monday 7:30 pm	1.195	0.634	9	
2	8	"Episode 8"	2 April 2024	Tuesday 7:30 pm	1.471	0.762	4	
2	9	"Episode 9"	3 April 2024	Wednesday 7:30 pm	1.322	0.687	6	
2	10	"Episode 10"	4 April 2024	Thursday 7:30 pm	1.206	0.635	6	
3	11	"Episode 11"	7 April 2024	Sunday 7:30 pm	1.140	0.564	10	
3	12	"Episode 12"	8 April 2024	Monday 7:30 pm	1.150	0.592	11	
3	13	"Episode 13"	9 April 2024	Tuesday 7:30 pm	1.387	0.737	6	
3	14	"Episode 14"	10 April 2024	Wednesday 7:30 pm	1.270	0.673	6	
3	15	"Episode 15"	11 April 2024	Thursday 7:30 pm	1.229	0.625	6	
4	16	"Episode 16"	14 April 2024	Sunday 7:30 pm	1.271	0.650	8	
4	17	"Episode 17"	15 April 2024	Monday 7:30 pm	1.256	0.623	11	
4	18	"Episode 18"	16 April 2024	Tuesday 7:30 pm	1.266	0.639	9	
4	19	"Episode 19"	17 April 2024	Wednesday 7:30 pm	1.278	0.641	7	
4	20	"Episode 20"	18 April 2024	Thursday 7:30 pm	1.250	0.619	7	
5	21	"Grand Finale"	21 April 2024	Sunday 7:30 pm	1.371	0.749	5	

- ^{a} From 28 January 2024, OzTAM ratings changed. Viewership data will now focus on National Reach and National Total ratings instead of the 5 metro centres and overnight shares.
