= Jess Eva =

Australian radio host

- Born: Australia
- Occupations: Radio host, television personality, author
- Years active: 2018-present
- Employer: Nine Network
- Known for: The Block, I'm a Celebrity…Get Me Out of Here!, Studio 10
- Partner: Norm Hogan
- Children: 2

Jess Eva is an Australian television personality, radio host and author known for her appearances on reality television and for co-hosting Triple M's breakfast radio show in Sydney.

== Early life ==
Eva grew up with no electricity until she was about eighteen, “People say it’s a bit unusual, but I grew up with it so for me it’s normal”, she explained on I'm A Celebrity...Get Me Out Of Here! in 2021. She was a lawn bowls player from a young age and eventually became a lawn bowls champion.

== Career ==
Eva appeared as a contestant on the fourteenth season of The Block in 2018 alongside her partner Norm Hogan.

Eva co-hosted the Triple M breakfast show in Sydney alongside Mark "MG" Geyer and Chris Page from 2019 to Nov 2022.

In 2021, she appeared as a contestant on the seventh season of I’m A Celebrity…Get Me Out Of Here!. She finished in third place. Also in 2021, Eva released her first book, “Why Wouldn’t Ya”.

In Late 2021, Eva and Hogan appeared as contestants on the new renovation show Renovate or Rebuild on the Nine Network.

Eva appeared as a recurring presenter on the morning talk show Studio 10. In November 2022, Sarah Harris announced her departure from the show and Eva was brought in as a temporary co-host alongside Tristan MacManus until the end of 2022. Eva continued to occur regularly as a contributor and fill in host into 2023.

In late 2023, it was announced that she and her former partner Norm would host a brand new renovation show Budget Battlers on the Nine Network in 2024. They returned for the show's second season in October 2025.

In July 2024, it was announced that Eva will be filling in on the Triple M Queensland drive show for the remainder of the year.

== Personal life ==
Eva has two children with Norm Hogan. While appearing on I'm A Celebrity...Get Me Out Of Here! Australia in 2021, she opened up to Abbie Chatfield about how she suffered from postnatal depression for twelve months after the birth of her son. In 2025, Eva revealed that she and her partner Norm were no longer romantically together, and had been separated since 2021, but continue to love together and co-parent their children.

== Television appearances ==
- The Block (2018)
- I’m A Celebrity…Get Me Out Of Here! Australia (2021)
- Renovate or Rebuild (2021)
- Studio 10 (2022–2023)
- Budget Battlers (2024–present)
