= I'm a Celebrity...Get Me Out of Here! (Australian TV series) season 8 =

I'm a Celebrity...Get Me Out of Here!
- Season 8
- Presented by: Chris Brown; Julia Morris
- No. of days: 20
- No. of contestants: 13
- Winner: Dylan Lewis
- Runner-up: Brooke McClymont
- Location: Dungay, New South Wales, Australia
- No. of episodes: 20

Release
- Original network: Network 10
- Original release: 3 January – 30 January 2022

Additional information
- Filming dates: 2 September – 20 September 2021

Series chronology
- ← Previous; Season 7 Next → Season 9

The eighth season of I'm a Celebrity...Get Me Out of Here was commissioned by Network 10 in February 2021. It launched on 3 January 2022 and is hosted by Julia Morris and Chris Brown. It is the second series to be pre-recorded in Australia, as a result of the COVID-19 pandemic. It was filmed in Dungay, Australia, where the original British series previously filmed, instead of its usual production location in South Africa. Filming occurred over three weeks in September 2021, with a live grand-finale airing on 30 January 2022.

== Teaser ==
The first teaser trailer, featuring hosts Chris Brown and Julia Morris in a burlesque-style parody of Monty Python's "Always Look on the Bright Side of Life", was released on 20 November 2021.

== Celebrities ==
On 2 January, the first two contestants were revealed by Network 10, prior to the premiere of the first episode, to be celebrity chef and television presenter Poh Ling Yeow and former AFL coach Nathan Buckley. On 3 January, former NRL player and television presenter Beau Ryan was the third celebrity also announced as a contestant prior to the show's premiere. In episode 2, international reality television star Joey Essex entered the camp as an intruder. Essex was previously a contestant on the thirteenth series of the British version of the show in 2013.

In an I'm a Celebrity world first, this season included a "fake celebrity" among the cast - David Subritzky assumed the identity of an influencer and shoe designer with 3.9 million Instagram followers. As part of a secret mission, Poh had to convince her campmates that he was in fact a celebrity.

Celebrity/Contestant	Known for	Status	Source
Dylan Lewis	TV & Radio Host	Winner on 30 January 2022	
Brooke McClymont	Singer-Songwriter	Runner up on 30 January 2022	
Nathan Buckley	Former AFL Coach	Third place on 30 January 2022	
Emily Seebohm	Olympic Swimmer	Eliminated 9th on 30 January 2022	
David Subritzky	Shoe Designer ("fake celebrity")	Eliminated 8th on 30 January 2022	
Joey Essex	British TV Personality	Eliminated 7th on 30 January 2022	
Poh Ling Yeow	Chef & TV Presenter	Eliminated 6th on 27 January 2022	
Cal Wilson	Comedian	Eliminated 5th on 26 January 2022	
Tottie Goldsmith	Actress, Singer & TV Host	Eliminated 4th on 25 January 2022	
Derek Kickett	Former AFL Player	Eliminated 3rd on 24 January 2022	
Maria Thattil	Miss Universe Australia 2020	Eliminated 2nd on 23 January 2022	
Beau Ryan	Former NRL Player & TV Presenter	Withdrew on 20 January 2022	
Davina Rankin	Former Married at First Sight Contestant	Eliminated 1st on 16 January 2022	

== Results and elimination ==
Indicates that the celebrity received the most votes from the public
Indicates that the celebrity was immune from the elimination challenge
Indicates that the celebrity was named as being in the bottom 2 or 3.
Indicates that the celebrity came last in a challenge or received the fewest votes and was evicted immediately (no bottom three)
Indicates that the celebrity withdrew from the competition

Elimination results per celebrity
Celebrity	Week 1	Week 3		Week 4					Grand Finale		Number of Trials
Celebrity	Week 1	Day 10	Day 14 (Note: The elimination on Day 14 was cancelled because Beau withdrew himself from the competition.)	Day 15	Day 16	Day 17	Day 18	Day 19	Grand Finale		Number of Trials
Dylan	—N/a	Safe	Safe	Safe	Safe	Safe	Safe	Safe	Winner (Day 20)		9
Brooke	—N/a	Safe	Safe	Safe	Safe	Safe	Safe	Safe	Runner-up (Day 20)		9
Nathan	—N/a	Safe	Safe	Bottom 3	Safe	Safe	Safe	Bottom 3	Third Place (Day 20)		8
Emily	—N/a	Safe	Safe	Safe	Bottom 3	Safe	Bottom 3	Bottom 3	4th	Eliminated (Day 20)	8
David	—N/a	Bottom 3	Safe	Safe	Safe	Safe	Bottom 3	Safe	5th	Eliminated (Day 20)	7
Joey	—N/a	Safe	Safe	Safe	Safe	Safe	Safe	Safe	6th	Eliminated (Day 20)	7
Poh	—N/a	Safe	Safe	Safe	Safe	Bottom 3	Safe	Bottom 3	Eliminated (Day 19)		7
Cal	—N/a	Safe	Safe	Safe	Safe	Bottom 3	Bottom 3	Eliminated (Day 18)			6
Tottie	Not in Camp	Immune	Safe	Bottom 3	Bottom 3	Bottom 3	Eliminated (Day 17)				5
Derek	—N/a	Safe	Safe	Safe	Bottom 3	Eliminated (Day 16)					6
Maria	—N/a	Bottom 3	Safe	Bottom 3	Eliminated (Day 15)						4
Beau	—N/a	Safe	Withdrew (Day 14)								5
Davina	—N/a	Bottom 3	Eliminated (Day 10)								2
Withdrew	N/A	None	Beau	None					None		
Bottom two/three	N/A	David Maria Davina	None	Nathan Tottie Maria	Derek Emily Tottie	Cal Poh Tottie	David Emily Cal	Poh Emily Nathan	None		
Eliminated	N/A	Davina; Lost elimination challenge	None	Maria; Lost elimination challenge	Derek; Lost elimination challenge	Tottie; Lost elimination challenge	Cal; Lost elimination challenge	Poh; Lost elimination challenge	Joey; Fewest votes to win	Nathan; Fewer votes to win	
Eliminated	N/A	Davina; Lost elimination challenge	None	Maria; Lost elimination challenge	Derek; Lost elimination challenge	Tottie; Lost elimination challenge	Cal; Lost elimination challenge	Poh; Lost elimination challenge	David; Fewer votes to win	Brooke; Fewer votes to win	
Eliminated	N/A	Davina; Lost elimination challenge	None	Maria; Lost elimination challenge	Derek; Lost elimination challenge	Tottie; Lost elimination challenge	Cal; Lost elimination challenge	Poh; Lost elimination challenge	Emily; Fewer votes to win	Dylan; Most votes to win	

== Tucker trials ==
The contestants take part in daily trials to earn food. These trials aim to test both physical and mental abilities. Success is usually determined by the number of stars collected during the trial, with each star representing a meal earned by the winning contestant for their camp mates.

The contestants decided who did which trial
The trial was compulsory and the celebrities did not decide who took part
The contestants were chosen by the evicted celebrities
The voting for the trial was of dual origin

Trial number	Airdate	Name of trial	Celebrity participation	Number of stars/Winner(s)	Notes	Source
1	3 January	Famous Blast Words	Beau, Brooke, Emily, Derek & Cal	3/5 stars	None	
2	4 January	The Hell Hotel	Brooke & Dylan	10/10 stars	None	
3	5 January	A Real Ice-Hole of a Trial	Joey	11/11 stars	None	
4	6 January	La Cocharacha Cantina	Beau, Derek & Nathan	11/12 stars	None	
5	9 January	The School of Shock	Emily, Poh, Cal, Dylan, Nathan & David	8.5/12 stars	1	
6	10 January	The Mile High Club	Davina & Tottie	13/13 stars	2	
7	11 January	It's My Party and I'll Cry if I Want To	David, Brooke & Emily	13/13 stars	None	
8	12 January	The Boiler Room	Joey & Maria	10/13 stars	None	
9	13 January	Getting Laid	Dylan, Derek & Tottie	9/13 stars	None	
10	16 January	Sphere Factor	Everyone	Blue Team	3, 4	
11	17 January	Puff the Pungent Dragon	Tottie, Nathan, Beau & Brooke	Red Team	4	
12	18 January	Sweat Factory	Emily, David, Joey, Poh, Derek, Maria, Cal & Dylan	Blue Team	4	
13	19 January	Battlestars	Maria, Derek, Nathan, Brooke, Emily & David	Red Team	4	
14	20 January	The Family Duels	Beau, Poh, Joey, Cal, Dylan & Tottie	Blue and Red Teams	4	
15	23 January	The Viper Room	Dylan	11/11 stars	None	
16	24 January	Flying Sausages	Poh, Brooke, Nathan & Emily	10/10 stars	None	
17	25 January	The Sacrifice	David, Poh & Cal	9/9 stars	None	
18	26 January	Camp Chaos	Brooke, Dylan, Nathan & Joey	4.5/8 stars	5	
19	27 January	Summer Lovin' It!	Everyone	8/8 stars	6	

Notes

- ^1In this trial, while only six celebrities participated, all campmates were able to watch. However, as the campmates stole food from the trial, the 8 and a 1/2 stars they had won were forfeited and no food was received by the celebrities for dinner.
- ^2Tottie, as an intruder, had to participate with Davina in The Mile High Club trial as part of her entry into the camp.
- ^3Brooke did not participate in this trial because she was medically exempt.
- ^4The celebrities competed against each other in two teams, a red team and a blue team, during Battles Week.
- ^5Julia correctly answered the last question for the celebrities, earning them an extra ½ star, however the celebrities were still dunked with slime and offal as though they had answered incorrectly.
- ^6As Brooke was medically exempt from participating in the trial, co-host Dr Chris Brown offered to step-in for her in the trial and won the camp two stars. As a result, Brooke replaced Dr Chris Brown's hosting position and co-hosted alongside Julia Morris.

=== Star count ===
Celebrity	Number of stars earned	Percentage
Beau	4/5 stars	80%
Brooke	17/17.5 stars	97.143%
Cal	6/8 stars	75%
David	11/13 stars	84.615%
Davina	12/12 stars	100%
Derek	13/18 stars	72.2%
Dylan	33.5/39 stars	85.897%
Emily	9/11 stars	81.81%
Joey	23.5/27.5 stars	85.45%
Maria	11/14 stars	78.57%
Nathan	12.5/16.5 stars	75.75%
Poh	11.5/12 stars	95.83%
Tottie	10/14 stars	71.428%

== Secret missions ==
=== Poh's secret mission: mystery celebrity twist ===
On the first day, it was revealed to Poh that a fake contestant, who was not actually a celebrity, would enter the camp. Poh had to convince her campmates that the fake contestant, David Subritzky, was in fact a real celebrity. The fake contestant assumed the identity of an influencer and shoe designer with 3.9 million Instagram followers. For each day that her campmates remained unsuspicious, Poh would win the camp a larger reward. The twist was similar to that of the fourth series of Celebrity Big Brother UK which saw non-celebrity Chantelle Houghton undertake the same task.

During the five days that Poh had to keep the fake contestant a secret, she received help from the camp's intruders, Joey Essex and Davina Rankin, who pretended to have known David. Poh succeeded in her challenge and on the last day on which the fake celebrity had to remain undercover, the campmates voted on whether David should be allowed to stay in camp to become a "real celebrity".

=== Nathan and Poh's secret mission: Sneaky weazel secret mission ===
In episode 8, Nathan and Poh received a secret mission in which they had to sneak out of camp to the Tok Tokkie after all their campmates had gone to sleep. In the Tok Tokkie, they were given ingredients to make a bowl of popcorn in the camp's treehouse, which they had to do without raising the suspicions of their campmates. If their campmates weren't alerted to Nathan and Poh making their popcorn they would be allowed to eat it, however if someone raised their suspicions, they couldn't eat any popcorn.

=== Beau's Super Spicy Secret Mission ===
In episode 9, Beau was given the opportunity to win his campmates McSpicy Meals, through participating in a two part challenge. In the first round, he had to drop the word "spicy" in three different scenarios. In between the rounds, he was given a chocolate shake to drink. In the second round, he had to make three of his campmates say the word "spicy". Beau succeeded in his challenge and won the camp McSpicy Meals for lunch.

=== Nathan's secret mission ===
In episode 14, Nathan was given the opportunity to win his campmates breakfast smoothies by pretending he had heartburn and making up an alternative breathing technique which he had to repeat on three instances in front of his campmates. Nathan made up the "headstand" method, in which he took slow, deep breaths whilst in the headstand position, and as his campmates were unsuspicious he succeeded in his mission and won the camp smoothies for breakfast.

=== Brooke's secret mission: Farts ===
In episode 15, Brooke was given a three round fart-based mission. In the first round, she was given a small sound device which played pre-recorded farts when she pressed a remote. She was told that she had to fart on three instances in front of three of her campmates. In the second round, Brooke gained an accomplice in the mission, David, who was given control of her remote, while Brooke had a similar mission to her first round although didn't have control of when she farted. In the third round, Brooke was given fart spray which she had to spray in the camp want raising the suspicions of her campmates. As Brooke succeeded in her mission, she won the camp english muffins with baked beans for breakfast.

=== The Camp's secret mission: "nose" ===
In episode 17, all the celebrities in the camp, other than David, were given fake noses and had to wear them while dropping the word "nose" in a conversation. As David was unsuspicious, the campmates each won a nose-shaped chocolate.

== Ratings ==
I'm a Celebrity...Get Met Out of Here! (season 8) overnight ratings, with metropolitan viewership and nightly position
Week	Episode		Original airdate	Timeslot (approx.)	Viewers (millions)^{[a]}	Nightly rank^{[a]}	Source
1	1	"Opening Night"	3 January 2022	Monday 7:30 pm	0.794	5	
1	1	"Welcome to the Jungle"	3 January 2022	Monday 7:30 pm	0.750	6	
1	2	"Episode 2"	4 January 2022	Tuesday 7:30 pm	0.634	5	
1	3	"Episode 3"	5 January 2022	Wednesday 7:30 pm	0.570	7	
1	4	"Episode 4"	6 January 2022	Thursday 7:30 pm	0.596	9	
2	5	"Episode 5"	9 January 2022	Sunday 7:30 pm	0.632	7	
2	6	"Episode 6"	10 January 2022	Monday 7:30 pm	0.633	7	
2	7	"Episode 7"	11 January 2022	Tuesday 7:30 pm	0.559	7	
2	8	"Episode 8"	12 January 2022	Wednesday 7:30 pm	0.603	6	
2	9	"Episode 9"	13 January 2022	Thursday 7:30 pm	0.584	6	
3	10	"Episode 10"	16 January 2022	Sunday 7:30 pm	0.596	9	
3	10	"Episode 10: Eviction"	16 January 2022	Sunday 7:30 pm	0.537	10	
3	11	"Episode 11"	17 January 2022	Monday 7:30 pm	0.602	7	
3	12	"Episode 12"	18 January 2022	Tuesday 7:30 pm	0.622	7	
3	13	"Episode 13"	19 January 2022	Wednesday 7:30 pm	0.568	6	
3	14	"Episode 14"	20 January 2022	Thursday 7:30 pm	0.535	8	
4	15	"Episode 15"	23 January 2022	Sunday 7:30 pm	0.517	7	
4	15	"Episode 15: Eviction"	23 January 2022	Sunday 7:30 pm	0.510	8	
4	16	"Episode 16"	24 January 2022	Monday 7:30 pm	0.625	6	
4	16	"Episode 16: Eviction"	24 January 2022	Monday 7:30 pm	0.570	9	
4	17	"Episode 17"	25 January 2022	Tuesday 7:30 pm	0.521	8	
4	17	"Episode 17: Eviction"	25 January 2022	Tuesday 7:30 pm	0.494	10	
4	18	"Episode 18"	26 January 2022	Wednesday 7:30 pm	0.502	9	
4	18	"Episode 18: Eviction"	26 January 2022	Wednesday 7:30 pm	0.466	10	
4	19	"Episode 19"	27 January 2022	Thursday 7:30 pm	0.498	12	
4	19	"Episode 19: Eviction"	27 January 2022	Thursday 7:30 pm	0.524	11	
5	20	"Finale"	30 January 2022	Sunday 7:30 pm	0.576	7	
5	20	"Winner Announced"	30 January 2022	Sunday 7:30 pm	0.617	6	

- ^{a} Ratings data is from OzTAM and represents the live and same day average viewership from the 5 largest Australian metropolitan centres (Sydney, Melbourne, Brisbane, Adelaide and Perth).
