= I'm a Celebrity...Get Me Out of Here! (Australian TV series) season 6 =

I'm a Celebrity...Get Me Out of Here!
- Season 6
- Presented by: Chris Brown; Julia Morris
- No. of days: 30
- No. of contestants: 14
- Winner: Miguel Maestre
- Runner-up: Dale Thomas
- Location: Kruger National Park, South Africa
- No. of episodes: 21

Release
- Original network: Network 10
- Original release: 5 January – 2 February 2020

Series chronology
- ← Previous; Season 5 Next → Season 7

The sixth season of I'm a Celebrity...Get Me Out of Here was commissioned by Network Ten on 7 February 2019 and premiered on 5 January 2020. It was hosted by Julia Morris and Chris Brown.

== Teaser ==
The first teaser trailer, which revealed Miguel Maestre as a contestant, was released on 5 November 2019.

== Celebrities ==
Celebrity	Known for	Status
Miguel Maestre	Chef & The Living Room presenter	Winner on 2 February 2020
Dale Thomas	AFL player	Runner up on 2 February 2020
Rhonda Burchmore	Singer & actress	Third place on 2 February 2020
Cosentino	Illusionist	Eliminated 11th on 30 January 2020
Charlotte Crosby	Former Geordie Shore star	Eliminated 10th on 29 January 2020
Myf Warhurst	Television & radio personality	Eliminated 9th on 28 January 2020
Ryan Gallagher	Former Married at First Sight contestant	Eliminated 8th on 28 January 2020
Perez Hilton	Blogger, columnist & media personality	Eliminated 7th on 27 January 2020
Tanya Hennessy	YouTube personality & comedian	Eliminated 6th on 26 January 2020
Tom Williams	Television presenter	Eliminated 5th on 23 January 2020
Erin Barnett	Former Love Island Australia contestant	Eliminated 4th on 22 January 2020
Billy Brownless	Former AFL player	Eliminated 3rd on 21 January 2020
Nikki Osborne	Comedian, actress & former model	Eliminated 2nd on 19 January 2020
Dilruk Jayasinha	Comedian & actor	Eliminated 1st on 16 January 2020

=== Celebrity guests ===
Ep	Celebrity	Known for	Reason of visit	Ref
20	Sandra Sully	10 News First presenter	Updated celebrities on world news	

== Results and elimination ==
Indicates that the celebrity received the most votes from the public
Indicates that the celebrity was immune from the vote
Indicates that the celebrity was named as being in the bottom 2 or 3.
Indicates that the celebrity received the fewest votes and was evicted immediately (no bottom three)
Indicates that the celebrity withdrew from the competition

Elimination results per celebrity
Celebrity	Week 1	Week 2	Week 3				Week 4					Grand Finale	Number of Trials
Celebrity	Week 1	Week 2	Day 16	Day 18	Day 19	Day 20	Day 23	Day 24	Day 25	Day 26	Day 27	Grand Finale	Number of Trials
Miguel	—N/a	Safe	Safe	Safe	Safe	Safe	Bottom 3	Safe	Safe	Bottom 3	Safe	Winner (Day 30)	9
Dale	—N/a	Bottom 3	Safe	Safe	Bottom 3	Safe	Safe	Safe	Safe	Safe	Safe	Runner-up (Day 30)	7
Rhonda	—N/a	Safe	Bottom 3	Safe	Safe	Bottom 3	Safe	Bottom 3	Safe	Bottom 3	Safe	Third Place (Day 30)	9
Cosentino	Not in Camp	Immune	Safe	Bottom 3	Safe	Safe	Safe	Safe	Safe	Safe	4th	Eliminated (Day 27)	4
Charlotte	—N/a	Safe	Safe	Safe	Bottom 3	Safe	Bottom 3	Safe	Bottom 3	Bottom 3	Eliminated (Day 26)		9
Myf	—N/a	Safe	Safe	Bottom 3	Safe	Bottom 3	Safe	Bottom 3	Bottom 3	Eliminated (Day 25)			4
Ryan	—N/a	Safe	Bottom 3	Safe	Safe	Safe	Safe	Safe	Bottom 3	Eliminated (Day 25)			5
Perez	Not in Camp			Immune				Bottom 3	Eliminated (Day 24)				3
Tanya	—N/a	Safe	Safe	Safe	Safe	Safe	Bottom 3	Eliminated (Day 23)					4
Tom	—N/a	Safe	Safe	Safe	Safe	Bottom 3	Eliminated (Day 20)						3
Erin	—N/a	Bottom 3	Safe	Safe	Bottom 3	Eliminated (Day 19)							5
Billy	—N/a	Safe	Safe	Bottom 3	Eliminated (Day 18)								2
Nikki	—N/a	Safe	Bottom 3	Eliminated (Day 16)									2
Dilruk	—N/a	Bottom 3	Eliminated (Day 13)										2
Bottom two/three	N/A	Dale Dilruk Erin	Nikki Rhonda Ryan	Cosentino Myf Billy	Charlotte Dale Erin	Myf Rhonda Tom	Charlotte Miguel Tanya	Rhonda Myf Perez	Ryan Charlotte Myf	Charlotte Miguel Rhonda	None		
Eliminated	N/A	Dilruk; Fewest votes to save	Nikki; Fewest votes to save	Billy; Fewest votes to save	Erin; Fewest votes to save	Tom; Fewest votes to save	Tanya; Fewest votes to save	Perez; Fewest votes to save	Ryan; Fewest votes to save	Charlotte; Fewest votes to save	Cosentino; Fewest votes to save	Rhonda; Fewest votes to win	
Eliminated	N/A	Dilruk; Fewest votes to save	Nikki; Fewest votes to save	Billy; Fewest votes to save	Erin; Fewest votes to save	Tom; Fewest votes to save	Tanya; Fewest votes to save	Perez; Fewest votes to save	Ryan; Fewest votes to save	Charlotte; Fewest votes to save	Cosentino; Fewest votes to save	Dale; Fewer votes to win	
Eliminated	N/A	Dilruk; Fewest votes to save	Nikki; Fewest votes to save	Billy; Fewest votes to save	Erin; Fewest votes to save	Tom; Fewest votes to save	Tanya; Fewest votes to save	Perez; Fewest votes to save	Myf; Fewest votes to save	Charlotte; Fewest votes to save	Cosentino; Fewest votes to save	Dale; Fewer votes to win	
Eliminated	N/A	Dilruk; Fewest votes to save	Nikki; Fewest votes to save	Billy; Fewest votes to save	Erin; Fewest votes to save	Tom; Fewest votes to save	Tanya; Fewest votes to save	Perez; Fewest votes to save	Myf; Fewest votes to save	Charlotte; Fewest votes to save	Cosentino; Fewest votes to save	Miguel; Most votes to win	

== Tucker Trials ==
The contestants take part in daily trials to earn food. These trials aim to test both physical and mental abilities. Success is usually determined by the number of stars collected during the trial, with each star representing a meal earned by the winning contestant for their camp mates.

The public voted for who they wanted to face the trial
The contestants decided who did which trial
The trial was compulsory and neither the public nor celebrities decided who took part
The contestants were chosen by the evicted celebrities
The voting for the trial was of dual origin

Trial number	Airdate	Name of trial	Celebrity participation	Number of stars	Notes	Source
1	5 January	Falling Stars	Charlotte, Miguel, Myf, Ryan & Tom	4/5 stars	^{1}	
2	5 January	Aargh you ready?	Rhonda, Nikki, Erin, Tanya & Dilruk	5/5 stars	^{1}	
3	6 January	House Gruels	Billy & Dale	10/12 stars	^{2}	
4	7 January	Elephant Snot	Erin, Charlotte & Miguel	11/12 stars	None	
5	8 January	Yucky Dip	Rhonda, Erin & Charlotte	4/12 stars	None	
6	9 January	The Hell-ympics	Tanya, Rhonda, Myf, Charlotte, Ryan & Erin	9/12 stars	None	
7	12 January	Dreadmill	Rhonda, Miguel, Dale & Charlotte	7/12 stars		
8	13 January	Bad Breath	Tom	13/13 stars	None	
9	14 January	Bingo Bites Back	Nikki & Dilruk	6/13 stars	^{3}	
10	15 January	Spewdio 54	Billy, Ryan & Rhonda	9/13 stars	^{4}	
11	16 January	Skippy Dipping	Cosentino & Tanya	11/13 stars	None	
12	19 January	The Scariest Trial We've Ever Done!	Erin, Myf & Ryan	10/12 stars	None	
13	20 January	Viper Room	Perez	12/12 stars	^{5}	
14	21 January	The Call of the Wild	Rhonda, Charlotte & Miguel	5/12 stars	None	
15	22 January	Oh My Gob.	Dale, Perez, Tanya & Tom	10/11 stars	None	
16	23 January	Electric Circus	Cosentino, Dale, Miguel & Perez	10/10 stars	None	
17	26 January	Buns of Steel	Charlotte, Ryan & Perez	9/9 stars	^{6}	
18	27 January	Balancing Act	Charlotte & Miguel	11/16 stars	^{7}	
19	28 January	Spin It To Bin It	Rhonda, Myf & Cosentino	7/7 stars	None	
20	29 January	The Big Wave	Charlotte, Dale & Miguel	5/5 stars	None	
21	30 January	Help From Our Friends	Everyone	3/5 stars	None	
22	2 February	Shocking Surgery	Everyone and their family members	3/3 stars	None	

Notes

- ^1 There were two tucker trials on the first day, with the celebrities entering the jungle in two groups of five. The first group had to bungee jump off a helicopter in Falling Stars while the other group were involved in a second tucker trial, where Erin was confined in a coffin and the other four celebrities had to answer trivia questions & retrieve bags of treasure from "hell holes" to free Erin.
- ^2 As intruders, Billy and Dale were required to complete the trial as part of their entry into camp.
- ^3 Nikki had severe vertigo after being spun multiple times, so she said the words "I'm A Celebrity...Get Me Out of Here!" after the sixth round which ended the challenge.
- ^4 Billy and Ryan were automatically placed in the compulsory trial while Rhonda was voted into the trial by the public.
- ^5 Perez, as an intruder, had to complete the Viper Room trial as part of his entry into camp.
- ^6 Charlotte, Perez and Ryan had to drop a pickle onto a giant bun while bungee jumping, which they all failed to complete on their initial attempts. Because Perez was the only celebrity who was able to attempt the challenge, the producers decided to give him another attempt to win the full slate of stars.
- ^7 In the trial, each star was worth ½ meal, so this meant Charlotte and Miguel won 5½ meals for dinner.

=== Star count ===
Celebrity	Number of stars earned	Percentage
Billy Brownless	13/19 stars	68.42%
Charlotte Crosby	25/45 stars	55.55%
Cosentino	16.5/18.5 stars	88.24%
Dale Thomas	23/25 stars	92%
Dilruk Jayasinha	7/14 stars	50%
Erin Barnett	7/14 stars	50%
Miguel Maestre	34.5/41 stars	84.15%
Myf Warhurst	8/8 stars	100%
Nikki Osborne	7/14 stars	50%
Perez Hilton	29/29 stars	100%
Rhonda Burchmore	14/30.5 stars	45.9%
Ryan Gallagher	10/17 stars	58.82%
Tanya Hennessy	18/21 stars	85.71%
Tom Williams	16/16 stars	100%

== Superhero Sundays ==
In the sixth season, Superhero Sundays were introduced (replacing The Sunday Slam), in which a group of celebrities would participate in a superhero themed trial each Sunday. These challenges include Dreadmill, The Scariest Trial We've Ever Done! and Buns of Steel.

== Camp Master & Minion ==
The Camp Master was able to sleep on a Bedshed bed and have breakfast including toast & eggs while the Camp Minion had to do everything that the Master asked them to do.

Celebrity			Original Run		No. of days
	Master	Minion	First day	Last day	No. of days
1	Tom	Cosentino	9	10	1
2	Billy	Tanya	10	11	1
3	Rhonda	Erin	12	13	1

== Secret Missions ==
This is a challenge in which celebrities have to take part in something without alerting the other celebrities to what they are doing.

=== The Camp's Secret Mission: Shake Things Up ===
In episode 8, all of the camp mates (except for Miguel) were given McCafé Real Coffee Shakes which they had to finish drinking without Miguel finding out. The camp were successful in their challenge and therefore won Miguel his own Real Coffee Shake.

=== Dale's Secret Mission: Fake Bum Challenge ===
Dale had to complete a series of missions without being detected wearing a series of fake bums, which each became progressively larger every round. These missions included making his bed, looking for a lost item under the bed closest to the stage and hugging Tom. He was successful in completing the challenges and won the camp a bowl of peaches.

=== The Camp's Challenge: Tweet for Treat ===
The camp had to guess which tweet applied to which contestant, whose name was blanked out on the sheet of paper. The celebrities gained enough correct answers to win s'mores for the camp.

=== Ryan & Dale's Secret Missions ===
In episode 17 and 18, Ryan and Dale were required to leave camp each morning to complete two Carnival Cruise Line themed missions which included indulging themselves to a "Carnival breakfast buffet" and a "romantic relaxation massage" at the Cloud 9 Spa. As the other camp members were unsuspecting of them completing a mission, the camp received a reward which was dinner at the Carnival pub.

== Ratings ==
I'm a Celebrity...Get Met Out of Here! (season 6) overnight ratings, with metropolitan viewership and nightly position
Week	Episode		Original airdate	Timeslot (approx.)	Viewers (millions)^{[a]}	Nightly rank^{[a]}	Source
1	1	"Opening Night"	5 January 2020	Sunday 7:30 pm	0.980	2	
1	1	"Welcome to the Jungle"	5 January 2020	Sunday 7:30 pm	0.873	4	
1	2	"Episode 2"	6 January 2020	Monday 7:30 pm	0.825	5	
1	3	"Episode 3"	7 January 2020	Tuesday 7:30 pm	0.737	5	
1	4	"Episode 4"	8 January 2020	Wednesday 7:30 pm	0.725	5	
1	5	"Episode 5"	9 January 2020	Thursday 7:30 pm	0.715	5	
2	6	"Episode 6"	12 January 2020	Sunday 7:30 pm	0.777	3	
2	7	"Episode 7"	13 January 2020	Monday 7:30 pm	0.801	5	
2	8	"Episode 8"	14 January 2020	Tuesday 7:30 pm	0.762	5	
2	9	"Episode 9"	15 January 2020	Wednesday 7:30 pm	0.679	4	
2	10	"Episode 10"	16 January 2020	Thursday 7:30 pm	0.734	6	
2	10	"Episode 10: Eviction"	16 January 2020	Thursday 7:30 pm	0.745	5	
3	11	"Episode 11"	19 January 2020	Sunday 7:30 pm	0.723	4	
3	11	"Episode 11: Eviction"	19 January 2020	Sunday 7:30 pm	0.736	3	
3	12	"Episode 12"	20 January 2020	Monday 7:30 pm	0.781	4	
3	13	"Episode 13"	21 January 2020	Tuesday 7:30 pm	0.723	6	
3	13	"Episode 13: Eviction"	21 January 2020	Tuesday 7:30 pm	0.737	5	
3	14	"Episode 14"	22 January 2020	Wednesday 7:30 pm	0.700	5	
3	14	"Episode 14: Eviction"	22 January 2020	Wednesday 7:30 pm	0.669	6	
3	15	"Episode 15"	23 January 2020	Thursday 7:30 pm	0.609	7	
3	15	"Episode 15: Eviction"	23 January 2020	Thursday 7:30 pm	0.697	6	
4	16	"Episode 16"	26 January 2020	Sunday 7:30 pm	0.486	8	
4	16	"Episode 16: Eviction"	26 January 2020	Sunday 7:30 pm	0.505	5	
4	17	"Episode 17"	27 January 2020	Monday 7:30 pm	0.575	9	
4	17	"Episode 17: Eviction"	27 January 2020	Monday 7:30 pm	0.677	8	
4	18	"Episode 18"	28 January 2020	Tuesday 7:30 pm	0.721	7	
4	18	"Episode 18: Eviction"	28 January 2020	Tuesday 7:30 pm	0.819	6	
4	19	"Episode 19"	29 January 2020	Wednesday 7:30 pm	0.717	8	
4	19	"Episode 19: Eviction"	29 January 2020	Wednesday 7:30 pm	0.782	7	
4	20	"Episode 20"	30 January 2020	Thursday 7:30 pm	0.707	7	
4	20	"Episode 20: Eviction"	30 January 2020	Thursday 7:30 pm	0.732	6	
5	21	"Finale"	2 February 2020	Sunday 7:30 pm	0.803	6	
5	21	"Winner Announced"	2 February 2020	Sunday 7:30 pm	0.884	5	

- ^{a} Ratings data is from OzTAM and represents the live and same day average viewership from the 5 largest Australian metropolitan centres (Sydney, Melbourne, Brisbane, Perth and Adelaide).
