= I'm a Celebrity...Get Me Out of Here! (Australian TV series) season 11 =

I'm a Celebrity...Get Me Out of Here!
- Season 11
- Presented by: Julia Morris; Robert Irwin
- No. of days: 28
- No. of contestants: 13
- Winner: Sam Thaiday
- Runners-up: Reggie Sorensen; Matty Johnson
- Location: Kruger National Park, South Africa
- No. of episodes: 21

Release
- Original network: Network 10
- Original release: 19 January – 16 February 2025

Season chronology
- ← Previous; Season 10 Next → Season 12

The eleventh season of I'm a Celebrity...Get Me Out of Here! was commissioned by Network 10 in September 2024 and premiered on 19 January 2025. It was hosted by Julia Morris and Robert Irwin.

== Teaser ==
The first teaser trailer, featuring hosts Julia Morris and Robert Irwin in a period resort 1950s-themed promo, was released on 12 November 2024.

== Celebrities ==
On 15 January 2025, the first contestant was revealed, prior to the premiere of the first episode, to be media personality Matty Johnson. On 18 January, two-time Big Brother winner Reggie Sorensen was the second celebrity to be revealed as a contestant. On 19 January 2025, prior to the premiere, two more celebrities were revealed as former NRL player Sam Thaiday and comedian Dave Hughes. In episode 2, Bondi lifeguard Harrison Reid entered the camp as an intruder and in episode 6, the camp was joined by actor Sigrid Thornton.

Celebrity	Known for	Status	Source
Sam Thaiday	Former NRL player	Winner on 14 February 2025	
Reggie Sorensen	Two-time Big Brother winner	Runners-up on 14 February 2025	
Matty Johnson	Media personality	Runners-up on 14 February 2025	
Max Balegde	TikToker	Eliminated 10th on 13 February 2025	
Geraldine Hickey	Comedian	Eliminated 9th on 13 February 2025	
Harrison Reid	Bondi Rescue lifeguard	Eliminated 8th on 12 February 2025	
Zach Tuohy	Former AFL player	Eliminated 7th on 12 February 2025	
Dave Hughes	Comedian	Eliminated 6th on 11 February 2025	
Tina Provis	Love Island Australia contestant	Eliminated 5th on 10 February 2025	
Sigrid Thornton	Actor	Eliminated 4th on 10 February 2025	
Shayna Jack	Olympic swimmer	Eliminated 3rd on 9 February 2025	
Nicky Buckley	Television presenter and model	Eliminated 2nd on 6 February 2025	
Samantha Moitzi	Married at First Sight contestant	Eliminated 1st on 2 February 2025	

=== Celebrity guests ===
Ep	Celebrity	Known for	Reason of visit	Ref
19	Sandra Sully	10 News First presenter	Updated celebrities on world news	

== Results and elimination ==
Indicates that the celebrity received the most votes from the public
Indicates that the celebrity was immune from the vote
Indicates that the celebrity was named as being in the bottom 2 or 3.
Indicates that the celebrity was named as being in the bottom 5
Indicates that the celebrity received the fewest votes and was evicted immediately (no bottom three)

Elimination results per celebrity
Celebrity	Week 1	Week 2	Week 3	Week 4					Grand Finale	Number of Trials
Celebrity	Week 1	Week 2	Week 3	Day 23	Day 24	Day 25	Day 26	Day 27	Grand Finale	Number of Trials
Sam	—N/a	Safe	Safe	Safe	Safe	Safe	Safe	Safe	Winner (Day 28)	7
Reggie	—N/a	Safe	Safe	Safe	Safe	Safe	Bottom 3	Safe	Runners-up (Day 28)	5
Matty	—N/a	Safe	Safe	Safe	Safe	Safe	Safe	Safe	Runners-up (Day 28)	6
Max	—N/a	Safe	Safe	Safe	Safe	Bottom 3	Safe	4th	Eliminated (Day 27)	7
Geraldine	—N/a	Safe	Safe	Safe	Bottom 5	Safe	Safe	5th	Eliminated (Day 27)	5
Harrison	—N/a	Safe	Safe	Bottom 5	Safe	Safe	Bottom 3	Eliminated (Day 26)		4
Zach	—N/a	Safe	Bottom 5	Safe	Bottom 5	Bottom 3	Bottom 3	Eliminated (Day 26)		5
Dave	—N/a	Bottom 3	Safe	Bottom 3	Bottom 5	Bottom 3	Eliminated (Day 25)			5
Tina	—N/a	Safe	Bottom 3	Bottom 3	Bottom 2	Eliminated (Day 24)				4
Sigrid	Not in Camp	Bottom 3	Bottom 3	Bottom 5	Bottom 2	Eliminated (Day 24)				3
Shayna	—N/a	Bottom 5	Bottom 5	Bottom 3	Eliminated (Day 23)					3
Nicky	—N/a	Bottom 5	Bottom 3	Eliminated (Day 20)						3
Samantha	—N/a	Bottom 3	Eliminated (Day 16)							2
Bottom two/three	N/A	Dave Samantha Sigrid	Nicky Sigrid Tina	Dave Shayna Tina	Sigrid Tina	Dave Max Zach	Harrison Reggie Zach	None		
Eliminated	N/A	Samantha; Fewest votes to save	Nicky; Fewest votes to save	Shayna; Fewest votes to save	Sigrid; Fewest votes to save	Dave; Fewest votes to save	Zach; Fewest votes to save	Geraldine; Fewest votes to save	Matty; Fewest votes to win	
Eliminated	N/A	Samantha; Fewest votes to save	Nicky; Fewest votes to save	Shayna; Fewest votes to save	Sigrid; Fewest votes to save	Dave; Fewest votes to save	Zach; Fewest votes to save	Geraldine; Fewest votes to save	Reggie; Fewest votes to win	
Eliminated	N/A	Samantha; Fewest votes to save	Nicky; Fewest votes to save	Shayna; Fewest votes to save	Tina; Fewer votes to save	Dave; Fewest votes to save	Harrison; Fewer votes to save	Max; Fewer votes to save	Reggie; Fewest votes to win	
Eliminated	N/A	Samantha; Fewest votes to save	Nicky; Fewest votes to save	Shayna; Fewest votes to save	Tina; Fewer votes to save	Dave; Fewest votes to save	Harrison; Fewer votes to save	Max; Fewer votes to save	Sam; Most votes to win	

== Tucker trials ==
The contestants take part in daily trials to earn food. These trials aim to test both physical and mental abilities. Success is usually determined by the number of stars collected during the trial, with each star representing a meal earned by the winning contestant for their camp mates.

The public voted for who they wanted to face the trial
The contestants decided who did which trial
The trial was compulsory and neither the public nor celebrities decided who took part
The contestants were chosen by the evicted celebrities
The voting for the trial was of dual origin

Trial number	Airdate	Name of trial	Celebrity participation	Number of stars/Winner(s)	Notes	Source
1	19 January	Leap of Doom	Dave, Max, Nicky, Reggie, Sam & Samantha	6/6 stars	None	
2	19 January	Tunnel of Terror	Geraldine, Matty, Shayna, Tina & Zach	5/5 stars	None	
3	20 January	A Frosty Welcome	Tina & Harrison	11/12 stars	1	
4	21 January	Basket-Fall	Geraldine, Matty & Max	1/12 stars	2	
5	22 January	House Party	Dave & Sam	10/12 stars	None	
6	23 January	Celebrity Versus the Volcano	Zach	6/12 stars	None	
7	26 January	Train Stopping	Harrison & Sigrid	13/13 stars	3	
8	27 January	Viper Room	Sigrid	11/13 stars	None	
9	28 January	Jungle Bed and Breakfast	Matty, Max & Reggie	13/13 stars	None	
10	29 January	What a Rubbish Trial	Nicky & Samantha	10/13 stars	None	
11	30 January	Macca's Run	Sam, Shayna & Tina	8.5/13 stars	4	
12	2 February	Build a Bridge and Get Over It	Dave, Geraldine & Zach	10/13 stars	None	
13	3 February	Jungle Breakdancing Championships	Max	10/11 stars	5	
13	3 February	Jungle Breakdancing Championships	Reggie	8/11 stars	5	
14	4 February	A Hole Lotta Trouble	Matty & Shayna	Shayna	5	
15	5 February	Block-bug-ster Video	Harrison & Sam	5/8 stars	5	
15	5 February	Block-bug-ster Video	Nicky & Tina	3/8 stars	5	
16	6 February	Whatever Floats Your Boat	Max & Zach	8/12 stars	None	
17	9 February	Tune of Doom	Dave & Sigrid	8/11 stars	None	
18	10 February	Lord of the Pies	Harrison	9/10 stars	None	
19	11 February	Grillin' Me Softly	Dave, Geraldine & Zach	8/8 stars	None	
20	12 February	Squeezy Does It	Max & Sam	7/7 stars	None	
21	13 February	Help From Our Friends	Everyone	2/5 stars	None	
22	16 February	Hot Tub Slime Machine	Everyone and their families	3/3 stars	None	

Notes

- ^1Harrison, as an intruder, had to participate with Tina in the A Frosty Welcome trial as part of his entry into the camp.
- ^2The celebrities won zero stars in total, however Julia gave them an additional star after Geraldine successfully caught a ball that Julia had thrown.
- ^3Sigrid, as an intruder, had to participate with Harrison in the Train Stopping trial as part of her entry into the camp.
- ^4The trial was originally announced to the camp as "The Great Aussie Run", however was later renamed at the trial, along with a reveal of the McDonald's reward. Although the celebrities won 8½ stars at the trial, the camp still received 13 meals worth of Mcdonald's with the condition that the new trial name and reward were kept a secret from their campmates until dinner.
- ^5In episode 12, the camp was divided into two teams, competing as boys vs girls. Only the team which won the most stars or gold pieces received meals, whilst the team which won the least stars or gold pieces received no meals for dinner.

=== Star count ===
Celebrity	Number of stars earned	Percentage
Dave	37/45 stars	82%
Geraldine	22/39 stars	56%
Harrison	38/43 stars	88%
Matty	20/34 stars	59%
Max	42/61 stars	69%
Nicky	14/22 stars	64%
Reggie	27/33 stars	82%
Sam	36.5/49 stars	74%
Samantha	11/14 stars	79%
Shayna	9.5/14 stars	68%
Sigrid	32/37 stars	86%
Tina	23.5/34 stars	69%
Zach	33/46 stars	72%

== Secret missions ==
=== Shayna's secret mission: Bingo ===
In episode 5, Shayna was given the opportunity to win her campmates' luxury items, by completing six tasks that had to be marked off on a "bingo" card, without her campmates noticing. She was successful in completing the mission and the camp received their luxury items in the evening.

=== Dave's secret mission ===
In episode 7, Dave was given a secret mission to only ask his campmates questions for an hour. He was successful and the camp received a bowl of lollies as a reward.

=== Reggie and Sam's secret mission ===
In episode 9, Reggie and Sam were given a secret mission to make each of their campmates say the word "fresh". They were successful and the camp received chocolate brownies from a HelloFresh meal kit as a reward.

=== The camp's secret mission: stickers ===
In episode 10, Tina was given a secret mission on behalf of the camp to get her camp mates to place a sticker of each of their faces on Dave Hughes' back. They were successful in completing the mission and received glasses of orange juice in the morning as a reward.

=== Tina's secret mission: selfies ===
In episode 14, Tina was given a phone in the Tok Tokki and had to take one selfie with each of her campmates without them noticing. She succeeded in the challenge and won Tim Tams for the camp.

=== Geraldine's secret mission: "one up" ===
In episode 16, Geraldine was given a secret mission to have a conversation in which she would have to "one up" each of her campmates, through mentioning that a mate of hers had gone one better than her campmates in whatever the conversation was about. She was successful in completing the mission and the camp received tea and hot chocolate as a reward.

=== Matty's secret mission ===
In episode 20, Matty was given a mission to wear cereal box shoes, while carrying cereal and a bottle of milk into camp, which he had to pour into the bowl and consume during the night without arousing the suspicion of his campmates. He was successful and won Kellogg's cereal for the camp in the morning as a reward.

== Ratings ==
I'm a Celebrity...Get Me Out of Here! (season 11) National Reach and National Total ratings, with nightly position
Week	Episode		Original airdate	Timeslot (approx.)	National Reach Viewers (millions)^{[a]}	National Total Viewers (millions)^{[a]}	Nightly rank^{[a]}	Source
1	1	"Opening Night"	19 January 2025	Sunday 7:00 pm	1.723	0.905	7	
1	2	"Episode 2"	20 January 2025	Monday 7:30 pm	1.446	0.750	8	
1	3	"Episode 3"	21 January 2025	Tuesday 7:30 pm	1.175	0.616	10	
1	4	"Episode 4"	22 January 2025	Wednesday 7:30 pm	1.221	0.604	10	
1	5	"Episode 5"	23 January 2025	Thursday 7:30 pm	1.116	0.578	11	
2	6	"Episode 6"	26 January 2025	Sunday 7:00 pm	1.079	0.554	9	
2	7	"Episode 7"	27 January 2025	Monday 7:30 pm	1.134	0.562	11	
2	8	"Episode 8"	28 January 2025	Tuesday 7:30 pm	1.220	0.586	13	
2	9	"Episode 9"	29 January 2025	Wednesday 7:30 pm	1.192	0.557	14	
2	10	"Episode 10"	30 January 2025	Thursday 7:30 pm	1.010	0.498	15	
3	11	"Episode 11"	2 February 2025	Sunday 7:00 pm	1.239	0.591	9	
3	12	"Episode 12"	3 February 2025	Monday 7:30 pm	1.096	0.533	12	
3	13	"Episode 13"	4 February 2025	Tuesday 7:30 pm	1.119	0.531	12	
3	14	"Episode 14"	5 February 2025	Wednesday 7:30 pm	1.212	0.553	11	
3	15	"Episode 15"	6 February 2025	Thursday 7:30 pm	1.090	0.557	12	
4	16	"Episode 16"	9 February 2025	Sunday 7:00 pm	1.161	0.551	9	
4	17	"Episode 17"	10 February 2025	Monday 7:30 pm	1.116	0.535	14	
4	18	"Episode 18"	11 February 2025	Tuesday 7:30 pm	1.063	0.512	12	
4	19	"Episode 19"	12 February 2025	Wednesday 7:30 pm	1.044	0.517	14	
4	20	"Episode 20"	13 February 2025	Thursday 7:30 pm	1.159	0.576	9	
5	21	"Grand Finale"	16 February 2025 ^{^{[b]}}	Sunday 7:00 pm	1.203	0.651	6	

- ^{a} From 28 January 2024, OzTAM ratings changed. Viewership data will now focus on National Reach and National Total ratings instead of the 5 metro centres and overnight shares.
- ^{b} The Grand Final was aired on 16 February but was filmed on the 14 February and with held to Sunday for scheduling.
