= Nicky Buckley =

Australian television presenter

- Born: Nicole Maree Louise Buckley; 25 November 1965 (age 60); Australia
- Occupations: Australian television presenter & model
- Years active: 1985−2017; 2025
- Known for: Sale of the Century (1993–1999)
- Spouse: Murray Bingham
- Children: 3

Nicole Maree Louise Buckley-Bingham (born 25 November 1965) is an Australian television presenter and model.

Buckley is best known for co-hosting Sale of the Century for six years from 1994 until 1999.

== Career ==
In 1991, Buckley co-hosted a revival of Network 10 dating show Perfect Match called Blind Date with Greg Evans. After six months in the role, Buckley was replaced by Ankie Nordberg. In 2025, Buckley claimed she was "shattered" and "embarrassed" when she lost the job on Blind Date, which prompted her to have acting and voice lessons.

In late 1991, Buckley starred in an adaption of Jerome McDonough's play Juvie. At the end of 1993, five Sale of the Century models were given a chance to co-host in the final week, with Buckley being the successful candidate.

After commencing her role on Sale of the Century in 1994, Buckley guest-starred on the Nine Network sitcom The Bob Morrison Show.

In October 1995, Buckley became the face of a national advertising campaign for Suzuki.

In 1997, Buckley prompted a national debate relating to her continuing to co-host Sale of the Century while heavily pregnant.

In December 1999, it was confirmed the Nine Network had decided not to renew Buckley's contract and would therefore not return to the show in 2000. She was succeeded by Karina Brown.

After finishing on Sale of the Century, Buckley-Bingham presented Hot Box Office on Foxtel pay TV, followed by presenting family and parenting segments on Good Morning Australia on Network Ten and Today on the Nine Network. She filled in for Kerri-Anne Kennerley on Kerri-Anne.

In 2005, Buckley competed on the third season of Dancing with the Stars on the Seven Network.

In 2006, Buckley became the host of Talk to the Animals.

In 2013, Buckley was a fill-in presenter for Sonia Kruger on Mornings.

In 2022, Buckley co-hosted a podcast series on ageing called Oldie Goodie, alongside Matthew Ferguson and Melissa Levi.

In April 2024, it was announced Buckley had joined the revival of Seven Network's lifestyle program Melbourne Weekender.

From January–February 2025, Buckley competed on the eleventh season of I'm a Celebrity...Get Me Out of Here!.

== Personal life ==
Buckley is married to Murray Bingham (who was also on Sale for many years), and they have three sons together.

She is a regular contributor to many charities, including supporting research into ovarian cancer and bushfire preparedness.
