= I'm a Celebrity...Get Me Out of Here! (Australian TV series) season 9 =

I'm a Celebrity...Get Me Out of Here!
- Season 9
- Presented by: Chris Brown; Julia Morris
- No. of days: 30
- No. of contestants: 14
- Winner: Liz Ellis
- Runner-up: Harry Garside
- Location: Kruger National Park, South Africa
- No. of episodes: 21

Release
- Original network: Network 10
- Original release: 2 April – 30 April 2023

Series chronology
- ← Previous; Season 8 Next → Season 10

The ninth season of I'm a Celebrity...Get Me Out of Here was commissioned by Network 10 in October 2022. The series premiered on 2 April 2023 and is hosted by Julia Morris and Chris Brown. It is the first series since 2020 to return to a live broadcast in Africa; the previous two series were pre-recorded in Australia, as a result of the COVID-19 pandemic. This series was Brown's last as host as he announced he would be joining the Seven Network from July 2023.

== Teaser ==
The first teaser trailer, featuring hosts Chris Brown and Julia Morris in a 60s airline themed promo, was released on 20 February 2023.

== Celebrities ==
On 28 March 2023, the first contestant was revealed by Network 10, prior to the premiere of the first episode, to be radio presenter Woody Whitelaw. On 2 April 2023, hours prior to the premiere, four more celebrities were revealed as television personality Ian Dickson, actress Debra Lawrance, reality contestant Domenica Calarco and television personality Kerri-Anne Kennerley.

Celebrity	Known for	Status	Source
Liz Ellis	Former netball player	Winner on 30 April 2023	
Harry Garside	Lightweight boxer	Runner up on 30 April 2023	
Aesha Scott	Below Deck star	Third place on 30 April 2023	
Nathan Henry	Geordie Shore star	Eliminated 10th on 27 April 2023	
Adam Cooney	Former AFL player	Eliminated 9th on 27 April 2023	
Woody Whitelaw	Radio presenter	Eliminated 8th on 26 April 2023	
Peter Helliar	Comedian & television presenter	Eliminated 7th on 25 April 2023	
Domenica Calarco	Married at First Sight contestant	Eliminated 6th on 24 April 2023	
Debra Lawrance	Former Home and Away actress	Eliminated 5th on 23 April 2023	
Nick Cummins	Former rugby player & The Bachelor star	Eliminated 4th on 20 April 2023	
Ian "Dicko" Dickson	Music executive & television personality	Eliminated 3rd on 19 April 2023	
Bianca Hunt	Television presenter	Eliminated 2nd on 16 April 2023	
Anna Polyviou	Celebrity chef	Eliminated 1st on 16 April 2023	
Kerri-Anne Kennerley	Television presenter	Withdrew on 6 April 2023	

=== Celebrity guests ===
Ep	Celebrity	Known for	Reason of visit	Ref
19	Sandra Sully	10 News First presenter	Updated celebrities on world news	

== Results and elimination ==
Indicates that the celebrity received the most votes from the public
Indicates that the celebrity was immune from the elimination challenge
Indicates that the celebrity was named as being in the bottom 2 or 3.
Indicates that the celebrity came last in a challenge or received the fewest votes and was evicted immediately (no bottom three)
Indicates that the celebrity withdrew from the competition

Elimination results per celebrity
Celebrity	Week 1	Week 2	Week 3		Week 4					Grand Finale	Number of Trials
Celebrity	Week 1	Week 2	Day 19	Day 20	Day 23	Day 24	Day 25	Day 26	Day 27	Grand Finale	Number of Trials
Liz	—N/a	Safe	Safe	Safe	Safe	Safe	Safe	Bottom 3	Safe	Winner (Day 30)	6
Harry	—N/a	Safe	Safe	Safe	Safe	Safe	Bottom 3	Safe	Safe	Runner-up (Day 30)	7
Aesha	—N/a	Safe	Safe	Safe	Safe	Safe	Safe	Bottom 3	Safe	Third Place (Day 30)	7
Nathan	—N/a	Safe	Safe	Bottom 3	Safe	Bottom 3	Bottom 3	Safe	4th	Eliminated (Day 27)	6
Adam	—N/a	Safe	Bottom 3	Safe	Bottom 3	Bottom 3	Safe	Safe	5th	Eliminated (Day 27)	6
Woody	—N/a	Safe	Safe	Safe	Safe	Safe	Safe	Bottom 3	Eliminated (Day 26)		3
Peter	—N/a	Safe	Bottom 3	Safe	Bottom 3	Safe	Bottom 3	Eliminated (Day 25)			3
Domenica	—N/a	Safe	Safe	Safe	Safe	Bottom 3	Eliminated (Day 24)				5
Debra	—N/a	Bottom 3	Safe	Bottom 3	Bottom 3	Eliminated (Day 23)					1
Nick	Not in Camp	Safe	Safe	Bottom 3	Eliminated (Day 20)						3
Dicko	—N/a	Safe	Bottom 3	Eliminated (Day 19)							2
Bianca	—N/a	Bottom 3	Eliminated (Day 16)								1
Anna	—N/a	Bottom 3	Eliminated (Day 16)								1
Kerri-Anne	Withdrew (Day 5)										3
Withdrew	Kerri-Anne	None							None		
Bottom two/three	N/A	Anna Bianca Debra	Adam Dicko Peter	Debra Nathan Nick	Adam Debra Peter	Adam Domenica Nathan	Harry Nathan Peter	Aesha Liz Woody	None		
Eliminated	N/A	Anna; Fewest votes to save	Dicko; Fewest votes to save	Nick; Fewest votes to save	Debra; Fewest votes to save	Domenica; Fewest votes to save	Peter; Fewest votes to save	Woody; Fewest votes to save	Adam; Fewest votes to save	Aesha; Fewest votes to win	
Eliminated	N/A	Anna; Fewest votes to save	Dicko; Fewest votes to save	Nick; Fewest votes to save	Debra; Fewest votes to save	Domenica; Fewest votes to save	Peter; Fewest votes to save	Woody; Fewest votes to save	Adam; Fewest votes to save	Harry; Fewer votes to win	
Eliminated	N/A	Bianca; Fewer votes to save	Dicko; Fewest votes to save	Nick; Fewest votes to save	Debra; Fewest votes to save	Domenica; Fewest votes to save	Peter; Fewest votes to save	Woody; Fewest votes to save	Nathan; Fewer votes to save	Harry; Fewer votes to win	
Eliminated	N/A	Bianca; Fewer votes to save	Dicko; Fewest votes to save	Nick; Fewest votes to save	Debra; Fewest votes to save	Domenica; Fewest votes to save	Peter; Fewest votes to save	Woody; Fewest votes to save	Nathan; Fewer votes to save	Liz; Most votes to win	

== Tucker trials ==
The contestants take part in daily trials to earn food. These trials aim to test both physical and mental abilities. Success is usually determined by the number of stars collected during the trial, with each star representing a meal earned by the winning contestant for their camp mates.

The public voted for who they wanted to face the trial
The contestants decided who did which trial
The trial was compulsory and neither the public nor celebrities decided who took part
The contestants were chosen by the evicted celebrities
The voting for the trial was of dual origin

Trial number	Airdate	Name of trial	Celebrity participation	Number of stars	Notes	Source
1	3 April	Unsafe Crackers	Domenica & Kerri-Anne	12/13 stars	1	
2	4 April	Grave Danger	Nathan	12/13 stars	None	
3	5 April	Take the Plunge	Aesha & Kerri-Anne	6.5/13 stars	2	
4	6 April	New Balls Please	Dicko, Domenica, Kerri-Anne & Woody	3/13 stars	3	
5	9 April	Egg-ceptional Easter Eggathon	Adam, Anna, Harry & Peter	7/12 stars	None	
6	10 April	Cliffhanger	Liz & Nick	13/13 stars	4	
7	11 April	Honey Badger vs Honey Badger	Nick	10/13 stars	None	
8	12 April	Fear Pong	Aesha, Bianca, Debra & Nathan	6/13 stars	None	
9	13 April	Slime Doesn't Pay	Adam, Domenica, Harry & Woody	10/13 stars	None	
10	16 April	Viper Room	Dicko & Domenica	11/13 stars	None	
11	17 April	Balls of Steel	Adam & Aesha	5/11 stars	None	
12	18 April	Yo Ho Ho and a Barrel of Celebrity	Nathan & Peter	8/11 stars	None	
13	19 April	Read It and Weep	Adam, Liz & Nick	11/11 stars	None	
14	20 April	The Only Way is Up	Harry	8/10 stars	None	
15	23 April	Stinking Ship	Aesha	7/9 stars	None	
16	24 April	Beam Me Up	Domenica, Nathan & Woody	8/8 stars	5	
17	25 April	Dive Bar	Harry, Liz & Peter	7/7 stars	None	
18	26 April	Help From Our Friends	Everyone	2.5/6 stars	None	
19	27 April	Ramp It Up	Everyone	5/5 stars	None	
20	30 April	Tough Love	Everyone and their family members	3/3 stars	None	

Notes

- ^1Kerri-Anne, as an intruder, had to participate with Domenica in the Unsafe Crackers trial as part of her entry into the camp.
- ^2Kerri-Anne chose not to participate in the trial, as she said the words "I'm A Celebrity...Get Me Out of Here!" prior to it beginning. As a result, Aesha had to complete the trial on her own and was only able to keep half the stars she won. Whilst Aesha won all 13 stars, the camp only received 6½ meals worth of dinner.
- ^3Kerri-Anne and Domenica had an argument at the end of the trial, after Kerri-Anne had refused to participate in the trial's second round, which was an 'all-or-nothing' challenge that all trialists had to complete to win their stars. Kerri-Anne left the trial early and returned to the camp before the rest of the group, where she announced that she was quitting the series and said the words "I'm A Celebrity...Get Me Out of Here!".
- ^4Nick, as an intruder, had to participate with Liz in the Cliffhanger trial as part of his entry into the camp.
- ^5This trial was a prank on the celebrities - as all three attempted it, they received the full eight stars for camp.

=== Star count ===
Celebrity	Number of stars earned	Percentage
Adam	26/47 stars	55%
Aesha	31/46 stars	67%
Anna	7/12 stars	58%
Bianca	6/13 stars	46%
Debra	6/13 stars	46%
Dicko	14/26 stars	54%
Domenica	44/60 stars	73%
Harry	25/42 stars	60%
Kerri-Anne	15/39 stars	38%
Liz	31/31 stars	100%
Nathan	34/45 stars	76%
Nick	34/37 stars	92%
Peter	15/30 stars	50%
Woody	21/34 stars	62%

== Secret missions ==
=== The camp's secret mission: the worst day ever ===
On the first day, the camp mates were given a secret mission to make Peter Helliar's entry into camp the worst day ever without him noticing. During his entry into the jungle, the camp mates had to guess his identity incorrectly in a celebrity guessing challenge, ensure that he picked the shortest straw so that he had to retrieve a key from a snake-filled box and to call him by the incorrect name throughout his first night. The reward for completing the challenge was pillows for the camp.

=== Adam and Woody's secret mission: luxury splurge ===
In episode 5, Adam and Woody were given the opportunity to win their campmates' luxury items, by finding out each of their camp mate's biggest luxury splurge without them noticing. They were successful in completing the mission and the camp received their luxury items in the evening.

=== Debra and Nathan's secret mission: 3-metre distance ===
In episode 8, Debra and Nathan were separately given the opportunity to win their camp mates' crackers and vegemite, by staying 3 metres away and close to each other without the other noticing. They were successful in completing the mission and the camp received the crackers and Vegemite in the evening.

=== Debra's secret mission ===
In Episode 14, Debra was given a mission to get the camp some treats to make 3 of the other campmates say the word 'Miguel'. The challenge was given by former king of the jungle, celebrity chef Miguel Maestre. She was successful and the camp received snacks and drinks as a reward.

== Ratings ==
I'm a Celebrity...Get Me Out of Here! (season 9) overnight ratings, with metropolitan viewership and nightly position
Week	Episode		Original airdate	Timeslot (approx.)	Viewers (millions)^{[a]}	Nightly rank^{[a]}	Source
1	1	"Opening Night"	2 April 2023	Sunday 7:30 pm	0.570	6	
1	1	"Welcome to the Jungle"	2 April 2023	Sunday 7:30 pm	0.596	5	
1	2	"Episode 2"	3 April 2023	Monday 7:30 pm	0.465	11	
1	3	"Episode 3"	4 April 2023	Tuesday 7:30 pm	0.518	7	
1	4	"Episode 4"	5 April 2023	Wednesday 7:30 pm	0.421	12	
1	5	"Episode 5"	6 April 2023	Thursday 7:30 pm	0.367	9	
2	6	"Episode 6"	9 April 2023	Sunday 7:30 pm	0.459	3	
2	7	"Episode 7"	10 April 2023	Monday 7:30 pm	0.457	9	
2	8	"Episode 8"	11 April 2023	Tuesday 7:30 pm	0.471	11	
2	9	"Episode 9"	12 April 2023	Wednesday 7:30 pm	0.436	12	
2	10	"Episode 10"	13 April 2023	Thursday 7:30 pm	0.382	9	
3	11	"Episode 11 & Eviction"	16 April 2023	Sunday 7:30 pm	0.445	7	
3	12	"Episode 12"	17 April 2023	Monday 7:30 pm	0.419	14	
3	13	"Episode 13"	18 April 2023	Tuesday 7:30 pm	0.435	11	
3	14	"Episode 14 & Eviction"	19 April 2023	Wednesday 7:30 pm	0.398	12	
3	15	"Episode 15 & Eviction"	20 April 2023	Thursday 7:30 pm	0.409	9	
4	16	"Episode 16 & Eviction"	23 April 2023	Sunday 7:30 pm	0.452	7	
4	17	"Episode 17 & Eviction"	24 April 2023	Monday 7:30 pm	0.409	13	
4	18	"Episode 18 & Eviction"	25 April 2023	Tuesday 7:30 pm	0.474	11	
4	19	"Episode 19 & Eviction"	26 April 2023	Wednesday 7:30 pm	0.422	13	
4	20	"Episode 20 & Eviction"	27 April 2023	Thursday 7:30 pm	0.464	8	
5	21	"Finale"	30 April 2023	Sunday 7:30 pm	0.562	4	
5	21	"Winner Announced"	30 April 2023	Sunday 7:30 pm	0.592	3	

- ^{a} Ratings data is from OzTAM and represents the live and same day average viewership from the 5 largest Australian metropolitan centres (Sydney, Melbourne, Brisbane, Adelaide and Perth).
