= Max Balegde =

English social media comedian, influencer and presenter (born 1999)

- Balegde in 2024
- Born: Max Glen Trobe; Darwen, England
- Education: Newcastle University
- Occupations: Internet personality; influencer; presenter
- Years active: 2020–present

Instagram information
- Page: max_balegde

TikTok information
- Page: Max_Balegde
- Followers: 3.7 million

YouTube information
- Channel: Max Balegde
- Genre: Podcast
- Subscribers: 117,000
- Views: 6.5 million
- Last updated: 21 April 2026

Max Glen Trobe, known professionally as Max Balegde, is an English social media personality. He has presented the BBC series Date Me At My Worst and the reunion episode of Stranded on Honeymoon Island and appeared on the eleventh series of the Australian version of I'm a Celebrity...Get Me Out of Here!, the podcast Saving Grace, and the British version of The Celebrity Apprentice. He also organised a fundraising event for Not a Phase in November 2023 and won the Online Influencer award at the British LGBT Awards in June 2025.

== Life and career ==
Max Trobe is from Darwen and studied at Holy Trinity Primary School, St Wilfrid's Church of England Academy, and Newcastle University. His first job was in a fish-and-chip shop. He was present at the Manchester Arena bombing, following which he came out as gay, and had intended on working in digital marketing. He opened a TikTok account in January 2020, taking a username in reference to a viral clip of Jesy Nelson attempting a Jamaican accent. By October 2021, he had gone viral repeatedly on the platform including for a Cameo video in which he encouraged a customer to lose weight, for a video where he beat a man to a train, and for multiple videos depicting shopping trips. He appeared on the inaugural episode of GK Barry's Saving Grace podcast in April 2022.

Balegde uploaded and then deleted footage of himself mocking a proposal that had taken place on a London Underground train in July 2022 and began hosting The Useless Hotline podcast with George Clarke in November 2022. In November 2023, after taking umbrage at comments the then-Prime Minister of the United Kingdom Rishi Sunak had made about gender at the Conservative Party Conference, he organised a fundraising event for trans charity Not a Phase. He signed to YMU in April 2024 and began hosting the BBC Studios series Date Me At My Worst that July. The following month, he went viral for defending Chappell Roan, who had been criticised for setting boundaries with her fans. Following the death of Liam Payne in October, he removed several videos he had published making fun of the singer.

In January 2025, Balegde began competing on the eleventh series of the Australian version of I'm a Celebrity...Get Me Out of Here!, following which Yahoo Lifestyle claimed that he had been an emergency replacement for Mel B. His appearances were in support of Minus18, an LGBTQ+ youth education charity. During his time on the programme, he shared his coming out story, ate a century egg, and made the final five. He eventually came joint fourth, being eliminated with Geraldine Hickey. He then won the Online Influencer award at the British LGBT Awards in June 2025, presented a reunion episode for Stranded on Honeymoon Island in September, and went viral for a video of a night out in Darwen in December. He was subsequently hired to host behind-the-scenes content for the BBC's coverage of the 2026 Winter Olympics during February; he hosted both that and a tour for The Useless Hotline at the same time. That April, it was announced that he would be one of the candidates on the 2026 run of The Celebrity Apprentice and a contestant on Amazon Prime Video's Would You Rather. Balegde and Clarke ended The Useless Podcast in May and began appearing on Celebrity Gogglebox in June.

== Filmography ==
=== Television ===
Year	Title	Role	Production	Notes	Ref.
2025	I'm a Celebrity...Get Me Out of Here!	Series 11 contestant	Network 10	4th place	
2026	The Traitors: Uncloaked	Guest	BBC	Series 4, episode 4	
2026	I'm A Celebrity... Unpacked	South Africa series 2 guest	ITVX	Episode 4	
2026	Would You Rather	Contestant	Prime Video		
2026	The Celebrity Apprentice	Celebrity Apprentice	BBC		
2026	Celebrity Gogglebox	Commentator	Channel 4	Series 8	

=== Podcasts ===
Year	Title	Role	Notes	Ref.
2022–2025	Saving Grace	Guest	Two episodes	
2022–2026	The Useless Hotline	Host		
