= Miguel Maestre =

Australian-Spanish chef

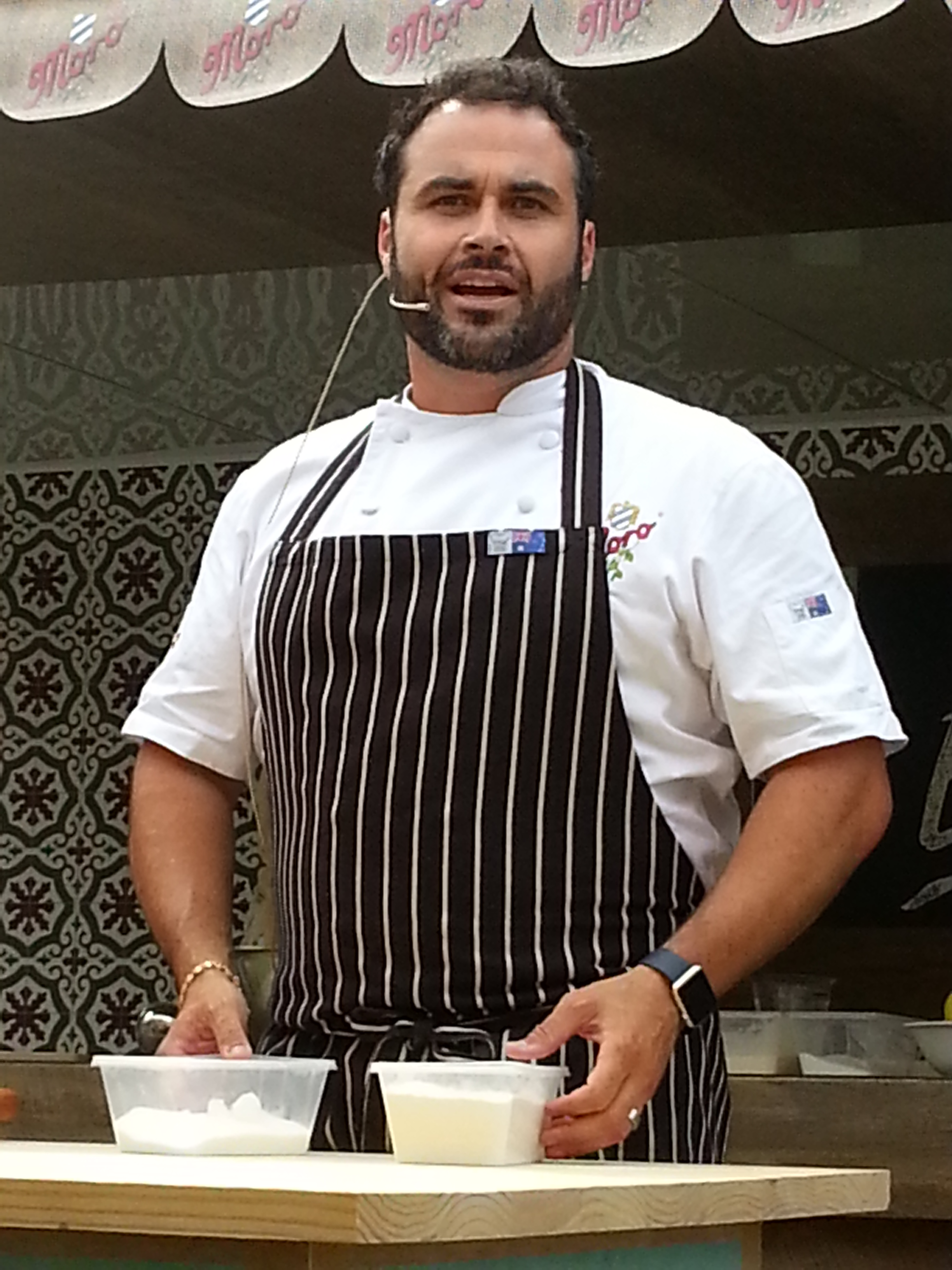
- Miguel Maestre at a pop-up food event in Adelaide in March 2016
- Born: Miguel Cascales Maestre; 5 November 1979 (age 47); Murcia, Spain
- Citizenship: Spain; Australia
- Occupations: Chef; restaurateur; writer; television presenter
- Years active: 2000-present
- Spouse: Sascha Newport (m. 2010)
- Children: 2
- Website: www.miguelmaestre.com.au

Miguel Cascales Maestre (born 5 November 1979) is a Spanish and Australian chef, restaurateur, author and television presenter, who is currently the host of Network 10's Ready Steady Cook Australia, and has co-hosted the lifestyle television series The Living Room.

Maestre has presented TV programmes Miguel's Feast, Miguel's Tropical Kitchen and Boys Weekend. He participated in, and won the sixth season of I'm a Celebrity...Get Me Out of Here! on Sunday, 2 February 2020.

In October 2013, Maestre became an Australian citizen.

== Career ==
At the age of 21, Maestre travelled to experience the world and moved to Scotland where he began cooking and learnt to speak English. Maestre worked at Indigo Yard, Montpelier's Partnership. Maestre then returned to Spain, before moving to Australia. He worked in some of Sydney's premier kitchens including Bather's Pavilion, Bel Mondo, Cru and Minus 5 at Circular Quay. At the age of 27, Maestre worked as Head Chef of Tony Bilson's Number One Wine Bar in Sydney's Circular Quay, where he was originally working under Manu Feildel. Following a meeting with Spanish chef Ferran Adrià at elBulli, Maestre opened Australia's biggest Spanish restaurant named El Toro Loco at Manly Beach. Maestre was head chef at El Toro Loco until he departed in 2010 following a legal stoush and the restaurant's name was changed to El Poco Loco.

In May 2018, Barry Du Bois and Maestre released an autobiographical book called Life Force about Du Bois's family, friendships, living with cancer and includes nutritional advice and recipes by Maestre.

In 2019, Maestre competed in the sixteenth season of Dancing with the Stars, where he was paired with Megan Wragg. He was first to be eliminated.

In 2020, Maestre won the sixth season of I'm A Celebrity...Get Me Out of Here! Australia.

In October 2023, Network 10 announced that Maestre would host the forthcoming revival of the cooking competition show Ready Steady Cook Australia, which would air at 7:30pm on Friday nights.

=== Television ===
Year	Title	Role	Notes
2009	Miguel's Tropical Kitchen	Presenter	13 episodes
2009	Boys Weekend	Presenter	13 episodes
2009	Ready Steady Cook	Guest chef/himself	1 episode
2011	MasterChef Australia	Guest chef/himself	1 episode
2011	Everyday Gourmet with Justine Schofield	Guest chef/himself	2 episodes
2014–2015	Miguel's Feasts	Presenter	13 episodes (1 unaired)
2012–2022	The Living Room	Presenter	
2016	All Star Family Feud	Contestant	
2016	Have You Been Paying Attention?	Guest quiz master	
2019	Dancing With The Stars	Contestant	
2020	I'm a Celebrity...Get Me Out of Here!	Contestant	
2024	Thank God You're Here	Waiter	
2024–present	Ready Steady Cook	Host	
2023–2025	The Cheap Seats	Himself	4 episodes

=== Books ===
- Miguel's Tapas, Hardcover (2010): ISBN 978-1742570600, ISBN 1742570607, Paperback (2014): ISBN 978-1742575438, ISBN 1742575439
- Spanish Cooking, Hardcover (2012): ISBN 978-1742570617, ISBN 1742570615
- Life Force by Barry Du Bois and Miguel Maestre, Paperback (2018) : ISBN 9781760682996

== Awards ==
In 2014, Maestre was honoured by the King of Spain, Felipe VI, with the Cruz de Oficial de la Orden del Mérito Civil (Officer's Cross - Order of the Civil Merit) for his "outstanding profile and representation of Spain in the Australian media" which was presented to Maestre by the Spanish Ambassador to Australia, Enrique de Viguera, in Canberra.

== Charity work ==
Maestre is an ambassador for Cancer Council Australia, CARE Australia and R U OK? since 2014

== Personal life ==
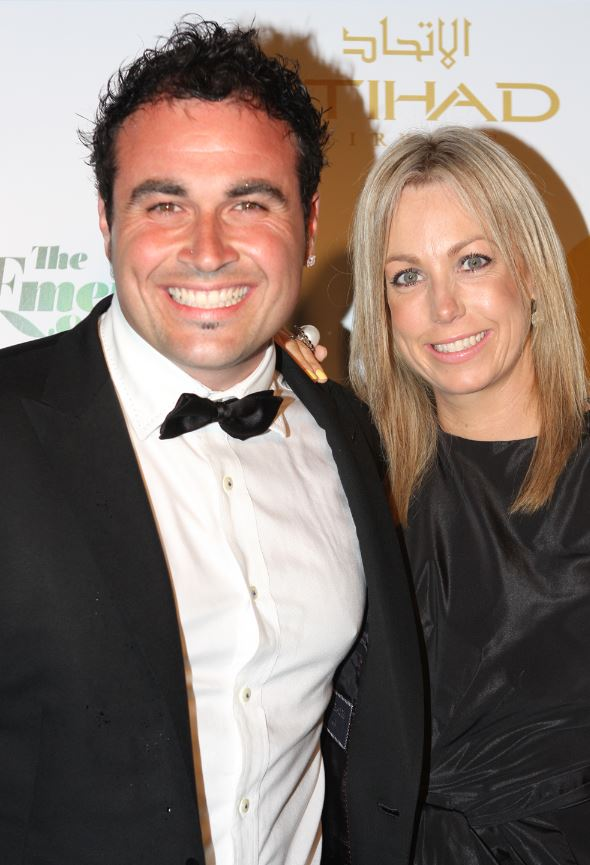
Miguel Maestre and his wife Sascha attend the Emerald and Ivy Ball to raise funds for Cancer Council Australia in Sydney in 2012.

Maestre met his Australian partner Sascha while he was living and working at Indigo Yard in Edinburgh and where she was working as a waitress. They married in 2010 and have a daughter (born 2011) and a son (born 2014). Maestre has a younger brother who is a restaurant manager.
