= I'm a Celebrity...Get Me Out of Here! (Australian TV series) season 3 =

I'm a Celebrity...Get Me Out of Here!
- Season 3
- Hosted by: Chris Brown and Julia Morris
- No. of days: 46
- No. of housemates: 14
- Winner: Casey Donovan
- Runner-up: Dane Swan
- Location: Kruger National Park, South Africa

Release
- Original network: Network Ten
- Original release: 29 January – 13 March 2017

Series chronology
- ← Previous; Season 2 Next → Season 4

The third season of Australia's I'm a Celebrity...Get Me Out of Here, which was commissioned by Network Ten on 1 August 2016, premiered on 29 January 2017. Casey Donovan won the series, beating Natalie Bassingthwaighte and footballer Dane Swan, and was crowned the first ever "Queen of the Jungle", the $100,000 prize money, was won for her selected charity, the Starlight Children's Foundation.

== Celebrities ==
Celebrity	Known for	Status	Source
Casey Donovan	Singer-songwriter	Winner on 13 March 2017	
Dane Swan	AFL player	Runner-up on 13 March 2017	
Natalie Bassingthwaighte	Singer & actress	Third Place on 13 March 2017	
Nazeem Hussain	Comedian, actor, & presenter	Eliminated 11th on 12 March 2017	
Steve Price	Journalist & radio broadcaster	Eliminated 10th on 9 March 2017	
Lisa Curry	Olympic swimmer	Eliminated 9th on 8 March 2017	
Ash Pollard	My Kitchen Rules 6 contestant	Eliminated 8th on 7 March 2017	
Carson Kressley	Television personality	Eliminated 7th on 6 March 2017	
Tegan Martin	Miss Universe Australia 2014	Eliminated 6th on 5 March 2017	
Keira Maguire	The Bachelor Australia 4 contestant	Eliminated 5th on 2 March 2017	
Kris Smith	Model	Eliminated 4th on 2 March 2017	
Tziporah Malkah	Former model & actress	Eliminated 3rd on 26 February 2017	
Jay Laga'aia	Actor & singer	Eliminated 2nd on 19 February 2017	
Tom Arnold	Actor & comedian	Eliminated 1st on 12 February 2017	

=== Celebrity guests ===
Ep	Celebrity	Known for	Reason of visit	Ref
13	Osher Günsberg	Television personality	Reading letters from home to celebrities	
27	Sandra Sully	Ten Eyewitness News presenter	Updating celebrities on world news	

== Results and elimination ==
Indicates that the celebrity received the most votes from the public
Indicates that the celebrity was immune from the vote
Indicates that the celebrity was named as being in the bottom 2, 3
Indicates that the celebrity received the fewest votes and was eliminated immediately (no bottom three)

Elimination results per celebrity
Celebrity	Week 2	Week 3	Week 4	Week 5		Week 6					Grand Finale	Number of Trials
Celebrity	Week 2	Week 3	Week 4	Day 35	Day 38	Day 39	Day 40	Day 41	Day 42	Day 45	Grand Finale	Number of Trials
Casey	Safe	Safe	Safe	Safe	Safe	Safe	Safe	Bottom three	Safe	Safe	Winner (Day 46)	11
Dane	Safe	Safe	Safe	Safe	Safe	Safe	Safe	Safe	Safe	Safe	Runner-up (Day 46)	13
Natalie	Safe	Safe	Safe	Safe	Bottom three	Bottom three	Safe	Bottom three	Safe	Safe	Third Place (Day 46)	12
Nazeem	Safe	Bottom three	Safe	Bottom three	Safe	Safe	Bottom three	Safe	Safe	4th	Eliminated (Day 45)	14
Steve	Safe	Safe	Safe	Safe	Safe	Safe	Bottom three	Safe	5th	Eliminated (Day 42)		10
Lisa	Safe	Safe	Bottom three	Safe	Bottom three	Bottom three	Safe	6th	Eliminated (Day 41)			11
Ash	Safe	Safe	Safe	Safe	Safe	Safe	7th	Eliminated (Day 40)				11
Carson	Not in Camp		Immune	Safe	Safe	8th	Eliminated (Day 39)					6
Tegan	Safe	Safe	Safe	Safe	9th	Eliminated (Day 38)						10
Keira	Not in Camp	Safe	Bottom three	10th	Eliminated (Day 35)							10
Kris	Bottom three	Safe	Safe	11th	Eliminated (Day 35)							10
Tziporah	Bottom three	Bottom three	12th	Eliminated (Day 31)								8
Jay	Safe	13th	Eliminated (Day 24)									7
Tom	14th	Eliminated (Day 17)										6
Bottom two/three	Kris, Tom, Tziporah	Jay, Nazeem, Tziporah	Lisa, Keira, Tziporah	Keira, Kris, Nazeem	Lisa, Natalie, Tegan	Carson, Lisa, Natalie	Ash, Nazeem, Steve	Casey, Lisa, Natalie	None			
Eliminated	Tom; Fewest votes to save	Jay; Fewest votes to save	Tziporah; Fewest votes to save	Kris; Fewest votes to save	Tegan; Fewest votes to save	Carson; Fewest votes to save	Ash; Fewest votes to save	Lisa; Fewest votes to save	Steve; Fewest votes to save	Nazeem; Fewest votes to save	Natalie; Fewest votes to win (out of 3)	
Eliminated	Tom; Fewest votes to save	Jay; Fewest votes to save	Tziporah; Fewest votes to save	Kris; Fewest votes to save	Tegan; Fewest votes to save	Carson; Fewest votes to save	Ash; Fewest votes to save	Lisa; Fewest votes to save	Steve; Fewest votes to save	Nazeem; Fewest votes to save	Dane; Fewest votes to win (out of 3)	
Eliminated	Tom; Fewest votes to save	Jay; Fewest votes to save	Tziporah; Fewest votes to save	Keira; Fewest votes to save	Tegan; Fewest votes to save	Carson; Fewest votes to save	Ash; Fewest votes to save	Lisa; Fewest votes to save	Steve; Fewest votes to save	Nazeem; Fewest votes to save	Dane; Fewest votes to win (out of 3)	
Eliminated	Tom; Fewest votes to save	Jay; Fewest votes to save	Tziporah; Fewest votes to save	Keira; Fewest votes to save	Tegan; Fewest votes to save	Carson; Fewest votes to save	Ash; Fewest votes to save	Lisa; Fewest votes to save	Steve; Fewest votes to save	Nazeem; Fewest votes to save	Casey; Most votes to win	

== Tucker Trials ==
The contestants take part in daily trials to earn food. These trials aim to test both physical and mental abilities. Success is usually determined by the number of stars collected during the trial, with each star representing a meal earned by the winning contestant for their camp mates.

The public voted for who they wanted to face the trial
The contestants decided who did which trial
The trial was compulsory and neither the public nor celebrities decided who took part
The contestants were chosen by the evicted celebrities

Trial number	Air date	Name of trial	Celebrity participation	Number of stars/Winner(s)	Notes	Source
1	29 January	In At The Deep End	Ash; Casey; Dane; Jay; Lisa; Natalie; Nazeem; Steve; Tegan; Tom	Dane; Natalie; Nazeem; Tegan; Tom	1	
2	30 January	Grotty Lottery	Kris; Tziporah	9/12 stars	None	
3	31 January	Sushi Pain	Ash; Casey; Nazeem; Steve	12/12 stars	None	
4	1 February	Slip And Slide	Nazeem; Steve	10/12 stars	None	
5	2 February	Fright At The Museum	Tom	12/12 stars	2	
5	2 February	Fright At The Museum	Dane; Jay; Kris; Lisa; Tegan	12/12 stars	2	
6	5 February	Fly Fishing	Ash; Casey; Dane; Jay; Lisa; Kris; Natalie; Nazeem; Steve; Tegan; Tom; Tziporah	4/12 stars	None	
7	6 February	Every Critter Counts	Dane; Natalie; Tegan	10/12 stars	3	
8	7 February	Eat It or Wear It	Nazeem; Tom	12/12 stars	None	
9	8 February	The Viper Room Reloaded	Ash; Tziporah	12/12 stars	4	
10	9 February	A Trip Down Memory Pain	Kris; Tziporah	5/12 stars	None	
11	12 February	Jungle's Got Zero Talent	Ash; Casey; Dane; Jay; Lisa; Kris; Natalie; Nazeem; Steve; Tegan; Tom; Tziporah	8/12 stars	None	
12	13 February	Throwing Up	Lisa; Natalie	2/11 stars	None	
13	14 February	Blind Date	Casey; Kris	11/11 stars	5	
14	15 February	Grim Gallery	Dane	10/12 stars	6	
14	15 February	Grim Gallery	Keira	10/12 stars	6	
15	16 February	Bad Pitt	Jay; Keira	9/12 stars	None	
16	19 February	Wheel Will Rock You	Ash; Casey; Dane; Jay; Keira; Lisa; Kris; Natalie; Nazeem; Steve; Tegan; Tziporah	Ash; Dane; Lisa; Natalie; Steve; Tegan	7	
17	20 February	A Floody Hard Tucker Trial	Carson	9/12 stars	None	
18	21 February	A Day At The Races	Carson; Keira; Tegan	9/12 stars	None	
19	22 February	The World's End 2.0	Keira; Nazeem	12/12 stars	None	
20	23 February	Dicing With Danger	Keira; Steve	Keira	8	
21	26 February	Sunday Fright At The Movies	Ash; Carson; Casey; Dane; Keira; Lisa; Kris; Natalie; Nazeem; Steve; Tegan; Tziporah	11/12 stars	None	
22	27 February	The Kitchen Stink	Ash; Nazeem	11/11 stars	None	
23	28 February	You Choose	Ash; Dane; Keira	11/11 stars	None	
24	1 March	Riding High	Keira; Lisa	6/11 stars	None	
25	2 March	Shooting Stars	Carson; Casey; Kris	6/11 stars	9	
26	5 March	Gross Train	Ash; Carson; Casey; Dane; Lisa; Natalie; Nazeem; Steve; Tegan	8/9 stars	10	
27	6 March	As Scream On TV	Lisa; Natalie; Nazeem; Steve	8/8 stars	None	
28	7 March	CarnEVIL	Dane; Lisa; Natalie	7/7 stars	None	
29	8 March	Floods Of Fear	Nazeem	6/6 stars	None	
30	9 March	Help From Our Friends	Ash; Carson; Jay; Keira; Kris; Lisa; Tegan; Tom; Tziporah	2.5/5 stars	11	
31	12 March	Family Tree	Casey; Dane; Natalie; Nazeem	8/8 stars	12, 13	
32	13 March	Back To Your Future	Casey; Dane; Natalie	3/3 stars	None	

Notes

- ^1The winning team of this tucker trial received; the quickest way into camp, their choice of bed in the camp & a pillow.
- ^2Tom was voted by Australia to do this Tucker Trial but was told six people are involved in it and he had to choose the other five to join him.
- ^3Casey & Ash had to decide which celebrities would be involved in this Tucker Trial.
- ^4This trial was used in the second season of the show with Laurina Fleure also winning 12/12 stars, however, this time two celebrities competed with double the number of snakes.
- ^5During the trial, they failed one meal but succeeded in the rest giving them 10/11 stars, but were given the option to have Chris Brown & Osher Günsberg to have an extra meal, they accepted and Chris & Osher succeeded in this, which gave them the 11th star.
- ^6As a new celebrity, Keira was automatically placed in the trial. Voting took place for a second celebrity to join her in the trial. Australia voted for Dane to be a part of the trial.
- ^7The trial involved 2 celebrities versing each other throughout 6 rounds, the celebrity who wins went into the winners circle and the celebrity that lost went into the losers circle, ending with 6 celebrities in each group. The winners received a share in a family meat pie with tomato sauce & quickest way into camp, whilst the losers only received beans and rice.
- ^8Keira & Steve got to choose a celebrity to join them as support (Steve chose Ash, Keira chose Lisa). In the trial, Steve & Keira would face-off against each other. The winner would return to camp with 10 stars while the celebrity that loses the trial, and their supporter, would be exiled to Skull Cave.
- ^9Even though they won six stars during this trial, the stars became null and void after their dinner was provided by fast food restaurant KFC.
- ^10This was the first trial to be done at night.
- ^11This trial was a quiz, it did not involve the remaining celebrities but the evicted celebrities instead, each of the celebrities had to individually give an answer to a question from a category (e.g. Sport, Movies etc.), if the answer was correct the remaining celebrities would receive half a star. five out of nine celebrities answered correctly.
- ^12Everyone competed in this trial with one of their family members.
- ^13This was Nazeem's 14th tucker trial, making him the current world record holder for the most bushtucker trials competed by a person.

== Celebrity Chest Challenges ==
Two or more celebrities are chosen to take part in the "Celebrity Chest" challenge to win luxuries for camp. Each challenge involves completing a task to win a chest to take back to camp. However, to win the luxury item in the chest, the campmates must correctly answer a question. If they fail to answer correctly, the luxury item is forfeited and a joke prize is won. The luxury item is "donated" by a celebrity from the outside.

The celebrities got the question correct
The celebrities got the question wrong

Episode	Air date	Chest challenge	Celebrity participation	Celebrity prize donor	Prize	Note	Source
5	2 February	Herd It On The Goatvine	Ash & Tziporah	Paul Harragon	Goats Cheese & Crackers	None	
10	9 February	Net Flicks	Natalie & Nazeem	Maureen McCormick	Nail File, Nail Clippers & Mirror	None	
17	20 February	Stripe It Lucky	Casey & Tegan	Brendan Fevola	100s & 1000s Biscuits	None	
24	1 March	Jumbo Wash	Carson & Natalie	Fitzy and Wippa	Peanut Butter & Crackers	None	
30	9 March	Budgie Smugglers	Nazeem & Steve	Shane Warne	Ice-cream Spiders	None	

== Skull Cave ==
Two or more celebrities are chosen to spend the night in the "Skull Cave", where they have no bed, bean & rice rations only and no contact with the other celebrities. If the celebrities successfully spend the entire night in the cave they will win a prize for the camp.

The celebrities stayed the entire night
The celebrities did not stay the night
Saved from staying in the cave

Episode	Air date	Celebrity participation	Prize	Prize for	Note	Source
6	5 February	Ash & Casey	Pillows	Ash, Casey, Jay, Lisa & Steve	12	
20	23 February	Ash & Steve	None		13	

- ^12In the first trial, there were two teams, in the trial the prize included pillows for the winning teams celebrities, Ash & Casey's team did not win and this was their second chance to win pillows for their team
- ^13 As a result, for losing the twentieth trial, Steve & his supporter Ash were exiled to Skull Cave. However, in a twist, the 10 campers were told they could save Ash & Steve from the Skull Cave but forfeit the 10 stars or let them stay there and receive them. The celebrities saved Ash & Steve from Skull Cave and forfeited their stars.

== Camp Leader ==
Each celebrity in camp must vote for who they want to be Camp Leader, the celebrity who receives the most votes becomes the new Camp Leader

Voted in as Camp Leader

Camp Leader
Celebrity	Vote for Leader	No. of Votes
Ash	Jay	0
Casey	Natalie	0
Dane	Jay	0
Jay	Steve	6
Kris	Steve	0
Lisa	Jay	2
Natalie	Lisa	2
Nazeem	Lisa	0
Steve	Jay	2
Tegan	Natalie	0
Tom	Jay	0
Tziporah	Jay	0

Celebrity		No. of Votes	Original Run		No. of days as Camp Leader
Celebrity		No. of Votes	First day	Last day	No. of days as Camp Leader
1	Jay Laga'aia	6 / 12 (Plurality)	Day 10	Day 24	14

== Ratings ==
I'm a Celebrity...Get Met Out of Here! (season 3) overnight ratings, with metropolitan viewership and nightly position
Week	Episode		Original airdate	Timeslot (approx.)	Viewers (millions)^{[a]}	Nightly rank^{[a]}	Source
1	1	"Opening Night"	29 January 2017	Sunday 7:00 pm	1.103	#7	
1	1	"Welcome to the Jungle"	29 January 2017	Sunday 7:00 pm	0.963	#8	
1	2	"Episode 2"	30 January 2017	Monday 7:30 pm	0.959	#6	
1	3	"Episode 3"	31 January 2017	Tuesday 7:30 pm	0.819	#8	
1	4	"Episode 4"	1 February 2017	Wednesday 7:30 pm	0.807	#7	
1	5	"Episode 5"	2 February 2017	Thursday 7:30 pm	0.823	#4	
2	6	"Episode 6"	5 February 2017	Sunday 7:00 pm	0.761	#8	
2	7	"Episode 7"	6 February 2017	Monday 7:30 pm	0.749	#11	
2	8	"Episode 8"	7 February 2017	Tuesday 7:30 pm	0.737	#11	
2	9	"Episode 9"	8 February 2017	Wednesday 7:30 pm	0.742	#11	
2	10	"Episode 10"	9 February 2017	Thursday 7:30 pm	0.773	#5	
3	11	"Episode 11"	12 February 2017	Sunday 7:00 pm	0.696	#10	
3	11	"Eviction"	12 February 2017	Sunday 7:00 pm	0.720	#9	
3	12	"Episode 12"	13 February 2017	Monday 7:30 pm	0.685	#10	
3	13	"Episode 13"	14 February 2017	Tuesday 7:30 pm	0.756	#8	
3	14	"Episode 14"	15 February 2017	Wednesday 7:30 pm	0.834	#6	
3	15	"Episode 15"	16 February 2017	Thursday 7:30 pm	0.910	#2	
4	16	"Episode 16"	19 February 2017	Sunday 7:00 pm	0.866	#5	
4	16	"Eviction"	19 February 2017	Sunday 7:00 pm	0.879	#4	
4	17	"Episode 17"	20 February 2017	Monday 7:30 pm	0.757	#10	
4	18	"Episode 18"	21 February 2017	Tuesday 7:30 pm	0.728	#10	
4	19	"Episode 19"	22 February 2017	Wednesday 7:30 pm	0.904	#5	
4	20	"Episode 20"	23 February 2017	Thursday 7:30 pm	0.871	#3	
5	21	"Episode 21"	26 February 2017	Sunday 7:00 pm	0.705	#9	
5	21	"Eviction"	26 February 2017	Sunday 7:00 pm	0.777	#7	
5	22	"Episode 22"	27 February 2017	Monday 7:30 pm	0.778	#8	
5	23	"Episode 23"	28 February 2017	Tuesday 7:30 pm	0.727	#10	
5	24	"Episode 24"	1 March 2017	Wednesday 7:30 pm	0.805	#6	
5	25	"Episode 25"	2 March 2017	Thursday 7:30 pm	0.767	#6	
5	25	"Eviction"	2 March 2017	Thursday 7:30 pm	0.818	#5	
6	26	"Episode 26"	5 March 2017	Sunday 7:00 pm	0.685	#10	
6	26	"Eviction"	5 March 2017	Sunday 7:00 pm	0.712	#8	
6	27	"Episode 27"	6 March 2017	Monday 7:30 pm	0.735	#9	
6	27	"Eviction"	6 March 2017	Monday 7:30 pm	0.684	#12	
6	28	"Episode 28"	7 March 2017	Tuesday 7:30 pm	0.662	#11	
6	28	"Eviction"	7 March 2017	Tuesday 7:30 pm	0.746	#8	
6	29	"Episode 29"	8 March 2017	Wednesday 7:30 pm	0.787	#8	
6	29	"Eviction"	8 March 2017	Wednesday 7:30 pm	0.850	#6	
6	30	"Episode 30"	9 March 2017	Thursday 7:30 pm	0.746	#7	
6	30	"Eviction"	9 March 2017	Thursday 7:30 pm	0.786	#5	
7	31	"Episode 31"	12 March 2017	Sunday 7:00 pm	0.705	#9	
7	31	"Eviction"	12 March 2017	Sunday 7:00 pm	0.833	#6	
7	32	"Finale"	13 March 2017	Monday 7:30 pm	0.989	#6	
7	32	"Winner Announced"	13 March 2017	Monday 7:30 pm	1.056	#2	

- ^{a} Ratings data is from OzTAM and represents the live and same day average viewership from the 5 largest Australian metropolitan centres (Sydney, Melbourne, Brisbane, Perth and Adelaide).
