= Shane Warne Foundation =

Former Australian not-for-profit organization

- Formation: 2004
- Founders: Shane Warne; James Packer; Lloyd Williams; Lee M. Amaitis; David Coe; John Ilhan
- Dissolved: 2017
- Headquarters: South Yarra, Victoria
- Chairman: Shane Warne
- Board of directors: Shane Warne; Anne Peacock; Glen Robbins; Andrew Bassat
- Revenue: $465,000
- Website: http://www.tswf.com.au/

Shane Warne Foundation was an Australian not-for-profit organisation founded in 2004 by former cricketer Shane Warne. The organisation closed in 2017 following a regulatory investigation and controversy over its finances.

== History ==
Warne founded the charity in 2003, with the intention of assisting "seriously ill and underprivileged children and teenagers". AFL player Brendon Fevola won the second season of I'm a Celebrity...Get Me Out of Here!, allocating half of the $100,000 prize to his nominated charity, The Shane Warne Foundation, and half to Paul Harragon's chosen charity, The Mark Hughes Foundation. Dermott Brereton appeared on the third season of The Celebrity Apprentice in 2013 and raised $294,687 for the charity. During 2015, Barry Hall appeared on I'm a Celebrity...Get Me Out of Here! and was runner-up, with his charity also being the Shane Warne Foundation.

== People ==
Past members of the Board

- Lydia Schiavello
- Glenn Robbins
- Andrew Bassat
- John Ilhan
- James Packer
- Lloyd Williams
- Garry Lyon
- Ray Martin
- Eddie McGuire

The charity also had a number of patrons and ambassadors, including Fifi Box, Dermott Brereton, Michael Clarke, Nick Riewoldt, Liz Hurley, Russell Crowe and Karl Stefanovic.

== Difficulties and closure ==
Consumer Affairs Victoria commenced an investigation in 2015 into the Foundation after it failed to submit financial returns. Financial returns in 2014 had revealed the charity spent $281,434 on fundraising during the year, but its efforts only raised $279,198. Newspapers alleged that the organisation was only donating 16 cents on the dollar of its income. During one year, the Chief Executive of the Foundation, Shane Warne's brother Jason, was paid a salary of $80,000, whilst only $54,600 was distributed to beneficiaries. The organisation spent more than $300,000 on catering, alcohol and prizes for events while posting significant annual losses.

In January 2016, in response to what it termed "unwarranted speculation", the Foundation announced its intention to distribute its final funds on 18 March 2016 and close down.
