= Logie Awards of 2022 =

Australian television award ceremony

62nd Logie Awards
- Date: 19 June 2022
- Site: Gold Coast Convention and Exhibition Centre, Queensland
- Produced by: Melinda Zahra

Highlights
- Gold Logie: Hamish Blake
- Hall of Fame: Bruce McAvaney
- Most awards: Lego Masters (3)
- Most nominations: Love Me (7)

Television coverage
- Network: Nine Network (HD)

The 62nd Annual TV Week Logie Awards ceremony was held on 19 June 2022 at Gold Coast Convention and Exhibition Centre in Queensland and broadcast live on the Nine Network. It is the first ceremony to be held since 2019 due to the COVID-19 pandemic. Public voting for the Most Popular Award categories ran from 15 May through to the day of the ceremony. The ceremony was criticised for their tribute to Neighbours, which was described as an "insult to the cast and crew" online.

== Winners and nominees ==
Nominees were announced on 15 May 2022.

=== Gold Logie ===
Most Popular Personality on Australian Television
- Hamish Blake in Lego Masters (Nine Network)
  - Julia Morris in I'm a Celebrity...Get Me Out of Here! (Network 10)
  - Karl Stefanovic in Today and 60 Minutes (Nine Network)
  - Melissa Leong in MasterChef Australia and Celebrity MasterChef Australia (Network 10)
  - Ray Meagher in Home and Away (Seven Network)
  - Sonia Kruger in Big Brother, Holey Moley, Dancing with The Stars: All Stars, The Voice and The Voice: Generations (Seven Network)
  - Tom Gleeson in Hard Quiz (ABC)

=== Acting/Presenting ===
Most Popular Actor	Most Popular Actress
Guy Pearce in Jack Irish (ABC); Bernard Curry in Wentworth – The Final Sentence (Foxtel); Hugo Weaving in Love Me (Binge/Foxtel); Ray Meagher in Home and Away (Seven Network); Rodger Corser in Doctor Doctor (Nine Network); Steve Peacocke in RFDS (Seven Network)	Kitty Flanagan in Fisk (ABC); Ada Nicodemou in Home and Away (Seven Network); Anna Torv in The Newsreader (ABC); Bojana Novakovic in Love Me (Binge/Foxtel); Deborah Mailman in Total Control (ABC); Sophie Dillman in Home and Away (Seven Network)
Most Outstanding Actor	Most Outstanding Actress
Richard Roxburgh in Fires (ABC); Hugo Weaving in Love Me (Binge/Foxtel); Jamie Dornan in The Tourist (Stan); Sam Reid in The Newsreader (ABC); Scott Ryan in Mr Inbetween (Foxtel)	Anna Torv in The Newsreader (ABC); Claudia Karvan in Bump (Stan); Deborah Mailman in Total Control (ABC); Isla Fisher in Wolf Like Me (Stan); Miranda Otto in Fires (ABC)
Most Outstanding Supporting Actor	Most Outstanding Supporting Actress
Colin Friels in Wakefield (ABC); Damon Herriman in The Tourist (Stan); Hugh Sheridan in Back to the Rafters (Amazon Prime Video); Matt Nable in Mr Inbetween (Foxtel); William McInnes in The Newsreader (ABC)	Heather Mitchell in Love Me (Binge/Foxtel); Katrina Milosevic in Wentworth – The Final Sentence (Foxtel); Mabel Li in New Gold Mountain (SBS); Noni Hazlehurst in The End (Foxtel); Rachel Griffiths in Total Control (ABC)
Graham Kennedy Award for Most Popular New Talent	Bert Newton Award for Most Popular Presenter
Tony Armstrong in News Breakfast (ABC); Alessandra Rampolla in Married at First Sight (Nine Network); Carlos Sanson Jr in Bump (Stan); Matt Evans in Home and Away (Seven Network); Melanie Bracewell in The Cheap Seats (Network 10); Will Lodder in Love Me (Binge/Foxtel)	Hamish Blake in Lego Masters (Nine Network); Carrie Bickmore in The Project (Network 10); Leigh Sales in 7.30 (ABC); Melissa Leong in MasterChef Australia and Celebrity MasterChef Australia (Network 10); Sonia Kruger in Big Brother, Holey Moley, Dancing with The Stars: All Stars, The Voice and The Voice: Generations (Seven Network); Tom Gleeson in Hard Quiz (ABC)
Most Popular Australian Actor or Actress in an International Program
Jacki Weaver in Yellowstone (Stan); Angourie Rice in Mare of Easttown (Binge/Foxtel); Murray Bartlett in The White Lotus (Binge/Foxtel); Sarah Snook in Succession (Binge/Foxtel); Troye Sivan in Three Months (Paramount+); Yvonne Strahovski in The Handmaid's Tale (SBS)

=== Most Popular Programs ===
Most Popular Drama Program	Most Popular Entertainment Program
Home and Away (Seven Network); Doctor Doctor (Nine Network); Love Me (Binge/Foxtel); RFDS (Seven Network); The Newsreader (ABC); Total Control (ABC)	Gogglebox Australia (Foxtel/Network 10); Anh's Brush with Fame (ABC); Hard Quiz (ABC); Lego Masters (Nine Network); The Masked Singer Australia (Network 10); The Voice (Seven Network)
Most Popular Reality Program	Most Popular Lifestyle Program
MasterChef Australia (Network 10); The Block: Fans Vs Faves (Nine Network); The Celebrity Apprentice Australia (Nine Network); I'm a Celebrity...Get Me Out of Here! (Network 10); Married at First Sight (Nine Network); SAS Australia (Seven Network)	Travel Guides (Nine Network); Better Homes and Gardens (Seven Network); Bondi Rescue (Network 10); Gardening Australia (ABC); Love It or List It Australia (Foxtel); The Living Room (Network 10)
Most Popular Comedy Program	Most Popular Panel or Current Affairs Program
Have You Been Paying Attention? (Network 10); Aftertaste (ABC); Fisk (ABC); Shaun Micallef's Mad as Hell (ABC); The Hundred with Andy Lee (Nine Network); The Cheap Seats (Network 10)	The Project (Network 10); 7.30 (ABC); Australian Story (ABC); A Current Affair (Nine Network); Four Corners (ABC); The Front Bar (Seven Network)

=== Most Outstanding Programs ===
Most Outstanding Drama Series	Most Outstanding Miniseries or Telemovie
The Newsreader (ABC); Bump (Stan); Love Me (Binge/Foxtel); RFDS (Seven Network); Wentworth – The Final Sentence (Foxtel)	Fires (ABC); New Gold Mountain (SBS); The End (Foxtel); The Tourist (Stan); The Unusual Suspects (SBS)
Most Outstanding Sports Coverage	Most Outstanding Factual or Documentary Program
Olympic and Paralympics Games Tokyo 2020 (Seven Network); 2021 AFL Grand Final (Seven Network); 2021/2022 Fox Cricket Ashes Coverage (Foxtel); 2022 Australian Open Women's Final (Nine Network); State of Origin – Game 1 (Nine Network)	Incarceration Nation (NITV); Burning (Amazon Prime Video); Firestarter – The Story of Bangarra (ABC); See What You Made Me Do (SBS); The School That Tried To End Racism (ABC)
Most Outstanding Reality Program	Most Outstanding Entertainment or Comedy Program
I'm a Celebrity...Get Me Out of Here! (Network 10); Beauty and the Geek Australia (Nine Network); The Celebrity Apprentice Australia (Nine Network); MasterChef Australia (Network 10); SAS Australia (Seven Network)	Lego Masters (Nine Network); Hard Quiz (ABC); Shaun Micallef's Mad as Hell (ABC); The Masked Singer Australia (Network 10); The Voice (Seven Network)
Most Outstanding Children's Program	Most Outstanding News Coverage or Public Affairs Report
Bluey (ABC); Dive Club (Network 10/Netflix Australia); Hardball (ABC); Little J & Big Cuz (NITV/ABC); Mikki vs The World (ABC)	"Brittany Higgins Interview" (The Project, Network 10); "Nazi's Next Door" (60 Minutes, Nine Network); "War In Ukraine" (7News, Seven Network); "Bursting The Canberra Bubble" (Four Corners, ABC); "Intimate Terrorism" (Insight, SBS)

== Changes to the ceremony ==
The 2022 ceremony saw the introduction of the inaugural Bert Newton Award for Most Popular Presenter. Newton's wife Patti Newton stated: "We are so thrilled Bert is being recognised this way and will be part of the Logies every year moving forward. It was such a big part of his career and he just loved it, so I know he would be pretty pleased with this honour." The new TV Week Silver Logie for Most Popular Australian Actor or Actress in an International Program was introduced. The award recognises the work by Australian actors in international television shows. Television personality Sophie Monk was chosen at the official TV Week Logies Event Ambassador.

== Controversy ==
The ceremony featured a tribute to the television soap opera Neighbours, a week after it filmed its last scenes. The tribute and recognition of its achievements aired during the presentation for the Most Popular New Talent award, and was presented by former cast members, Natalie Bassingthwaighte and Daniel MacPherson. The tribute was not liked by fans online, who thought the serial should have had a larger send-off, with it being described as "embarrassing", "disappointing" and an "insult to the cast and crew for its send-off of the iconic soap" on social media. Neighbours actor Matt Wilson said on Instagram of the tribute, "37 years and this is all we get", while David Knox of TV Tonight reported that the cast "were forced to watch from tables with an obstructed view." Two days later, actor Ryan Moloney (who plays Toadie Rebecchi) said, "We turned up and we did our mandatory three-hour talking to people on the red carpet. When we got in the room, we ended up being split up and stuck on two different tables. It was horrible! Our table was actually even stuck behind the cameras. We couldn't even see the stage. It was incredibly disappointing the package they put together. Daniel and Nat are just absolutely gorgeous people and absolutely nothing against them, but we've got people who have been on TV for nearly 30 years each, and I think probably the least they could do is get us to say something. I mean... we're in the bloody Hall of Fame. That's not how you treat people and a show that's in the Hall of Fame. I mean, good luck to the Logies, really."
