= Lee M. Amaitis =

American businessman and philanthropist (born 1949)

- Born: December 19, 1949 (age 76); Brooklyn, New York City, USA
- Education: Bishop Laughlin Roman Catholic High School
- Occupation: Business executive
- Children: 2

Lee M. Amaitis (born 1949) is an American businessman and philanthropist. He is the former chairman and chief executive officer of BGC Partners in London. He also served as the founder, president and chief executive officer of Cantor Gaming, a former gambling subsidiary based in Las Vegas, Nevada.

== Early life ==
Lee M. Amaitis was born on December 19, 1949, in Brooklyn, New York City. His father was a Lithuanian immigrant to the United States who worked in coal mines in Pennsylvania and later moved to New York City. His mother was born in the United States, but her ancestors were from Lithuania.

Amaitis dropped out of the Bishop Laughlin Roman Catholic High School in Brooklyn in the mid-1960s.

== Career ==
Amaitis started his career as a horse trainer at the age of 17.

He worked for Cowen & Co. from 1989 to 1991, and as Managing Partner and served as Senior managing director of Cowen Government Brokers from 1991 to 1995.

He started working for BGC Partners, then known as Cantor Fitzgerald, in 1995, when he was Senior Managing Director in New York City. A year later, he was transferred to the London office. He served as its co-chairman and co-Chief Executive Officer alongside Howard Lutnick from 2001 to 2008, when he became Vice Chairman. He also served as the Chief Operating Officer of eSpeed, an electronic trading tool of US Treasuries, from 2001 to 2004. Shortly after the September 11 attacks, when 658 of BGC employees died, Amaitis helped rebuild the company.

The British press nicknamed him the "Brooklyn Bruiser" for his brash style. In 2003, Steven Horkulak, a former employee, sued for bullying and won £1 million in a court decision.

In 2004, he founded Cantor Gaming & Wagering, later known as CG Technology, a subsidiary of Cantor Fitzgerald focused on sports books in Las Vegas casinos like The Venetian Las Vegas, the Palms Casino Resort, the Tropicana Las Vegas, etc., based out of the M Resort's Race and Sports Book. He has also established sports books in The Bahamas. He serves as its president and CEO. In 2013, the company was fined $5.5 million for violating regulations by the Nevada Gaming Control Board, and its vice president, Michael Colbert, was "charged with enterprise corruption; fourth-, third-, and first-degree money laundering; and fifth-degree conspiracy." Amaitis, however, was not investigated, as he was completely innocent.

He has served as the chief executive officer of Las Vegas Sports Consultants.

== Philanthropy ==
He serves on the board of trustees of the St Paul's Cathedral Foundation and the Boomer Esiason Foundation. He is an Ambassador for the Shane Warne Foundation, a non-profit organization in Australia which supports gravely ill and underprivileged children and teenagers. He has fundraised for Children in Crisis, another organization that takes care of underprivileged children, founded by Sarah, Duchess of York.

He leads an annual fundraising day for the families of 9/11 victims. He made a charitable contribution for construction of the London 9/11 Memorial Garden on Grosvenor Square in Mayfair, opposite the Embassy of the United States, London

He is an Honorary Commander of the 505 Test Squadron, Nellis Air Force Base in Nevada.

== Personal life ==
He has two children.
