= I'm a Celebrity...Get Me Out of Here! (Australian TV series) =

Australian reality television series

- Genre: Reality television; Family
- Created by: London Weekend Television (now part of ITV Studios)
- Based on: I'm a Celebrity...Get Me Out of Here!
- Directed by: Alex Mavroidakis; Grant Hoy; Peter Lawler
- Presented by: Julia Morris; Chris Brown; Robert Irwin; Ricki-Lee Coulter; Jim Jefferies
- Starring: See list of contestants
- Theme music composer: Grant Buckerfield
- Country of origin: Australia
- Original language: English
- No. of seasons: 12
- No. of episodes: 299

Production
- Executive producers: Stephen Tate; Alex Mavroidakis; Lara Hopkins; Beth Hart; Karen Dewey; Ben Ulm; Riima Daher; Peter Abbott; Tim Ali
- Production locations: Kruger National Park, South Africa (2015–2020, 2023–2026); Dungay, New South Wales, Australia (2021–2022)
- Camera setup: Multi-camera
- Production company: ITV Studios Australia

Original release
- Network: Network Ten
- Release: 1 February 2015 – 22 February 2026
- Network: Seven Network
- Release: 2027

Related
- The Fallout Zone; I'm a Celebrity...Get Me Out of Here!; I'm A Celebrity: Saturday Schoolies

I'm a Celebrity...Get Me Out of Here! (occasionally shortened to I'm a Celebrity) is an Australian reality television, based on the British television show of the same name. The series sees celebrities living in the jungle with few creature comforts, and competing in various challenges to earn meals and other luxuries. The celebrities compete for $100,000 to be donated to their chosen charity. The series is set in Kruger National Park, South Africa, and was originally hosted by Julia Morris and Chris Brown, until 2023, when Robert Irwin took over Brown’s hosting duties.

The series previously aired on Network Ten from 1 February 2015 until 22 February 2026 when the network made the decision to rest the program. In July 2026, it was announced the Seven Network had obtained the rights to the series which will premiere in 2027. In October 2026, the series was officially confirmed along with the announcement of new hosts Ricki-Lee Coulter and Jim Jefferies.

== Production ==
The series is usually filmed near Kruger National Park on a site in the Blyde River Canyon, which forms part of a nature reserve, in the Mpumalanga province of South Africa. The jungle camp and TV studios are based in Swadini Nature Reserve. The main filming site is close to Swadini, A Forever Resort and is located just off a waterfall trail which is accessed from a public road, where a temporary production base is housed, that continues down to the visitor information centre and observation deck for the Blyderivierpoort Dam. Between series the camp, trial sets and production facilities are almost entirely dismantled and removed from the site. The camp and trial areas are dressed with thousands of plants which are grown in bags with drip irrigation so they survive the weather conditions. Triosphere, a production company based in the country, assists in filming the series by providing local crew members.

On 16 July 2015, the series was renewed for a second season, which premiered on 31 January 2016. The second season was accompanied by the companion series I'm a Celebrity...Get Me Out of Here! Now! (similar to the original British series). It aired on Eleven (now 10 Peach) following each episode of the main series, hosted by comedian and former season one contestant Joel Creasey and The Bachelor Australia 3 contestant Heather Maltman. I'm a Celebrity...Get Me Out of Here! Now! did not air after the main show in later seasons due to low viewing rates. On 1 August 2016 the series was renewed for a third season with Morris and Brown returning as hosts, which premiered on 29 January 2017. A fourth season commenced on 28 January 2018 and concluded 12 March 2018.

A fifth season was announced and premiered on 13 January 2019. The show aired over a four-week period instead of the previous six week period. In addition to the normal show, an hour-long companion series called I'm A Celebrity: 'Saturday Schoolies' aired on Saturdays at 7 pm, hosted by Scott Tweedie, and involved the celebrities completing different tasks and assignments in order to win the 'golden lunchbox'. On 7 February 2019, it was confirmed the show would return for a sixth season, which premiered on 5 January 2020.

In May 2020, Network 10 renewed the series for a seventh season and in August 2020 they confirmed that it would continue to air in 2021 despite the COVID-19 pandemic. However, it was unclear whether the series would be able to film in South Africa or be moved to another production location. In November 2020, it was confirmed the series will be filmed in Australia at a site near Murwillumbah, New South Wales (the site used for many international versions of the show), which premiered on 3 January 2021.

The series' eighth season was announced in August 2021 and premiered on 3 January 2022, whilst a ninth season was renewed in October 2022 and premiered on 2 April 2023.

In February 2023, it was announced Brown had signed with Seven Network and would be leaving Network Ten in July 2023 after his final hosting duties of the 2023 season. In September 2023, it was rumoured Robert Irwin, son of Steve Irwin, would be Brown's replacement as host in 2024. In October 2023, Network 10 confirmed the series had been renewed for a tenth season at their annual upfronts, that Irwin would be taking over the hosting duties of Chris Brown and premiering on 24 March 2024. In September 2024, the series was renewed for an eleventh season with Morris and Irwin returning as hosts, which premiered on 19 January 2025. In November 2025, the series was renewed for a twelfth season set to premier in 2026, with Morris and Irwin returning as hosts. However, it was also revealed that the season would be pre-recorded in late 2025, with audience voting deciding the winner when the final three are announced.

The series uses the same theme music as the original British series, which is credited to Grant Buckerfield and contains samples of "Africano" by Earth, Wind & Fire and "Get Out of the House!" by Boom Crash Opera.

== Format ==
The premise of the show is that there is a group of well known personalities living together in a specially constructed camp site in a jungle. During their time in the jungle they are isolated from the outside world and are not commonly aware of outside events. The contestants compete for $100,000 to be donated to a charity of their choosing, in addition to being personally reimbursed for their participation. While in the jungle, some of the contestants (generally voted by the viewing public) compete in challenges for food and luxuries for the camp. These challenges often involve local wildlife and are meant to take the contestants out of their comfort zone. Each week one or more of the contestants are evicted from the jungle, based on either viewer votes or challenges. In addition, if the contestants become overwhelmed by their situation they can leave the series by speaking the phrase "I'm a celebrity...get me out of here!". However, it is reported that if contestants do quit they will have their income for participating in the series markedly reduced. Throughout the show, additional contestants (called "intruders") enter the competition; and beginning with season two, some contestants are only included temporarily (i.e. having a guest appearance). In the end, a final viewer vote occurs to determine the winner of the series, who is given the title of "King or Queen of the Jungle".

=== Bushtucker trials ===
The contestants take part in daily trials to earn food. These trials aim to test both physical and mental abilities. The winner is usually determined by the number of stars collected during the trial, with each star representing a meal earned by the winning contestant for their camp mates.

- Sunday Slam: In the fifth season, the celebrities participated in the "Sunday Slam", in which each Sunday a celebrity, or celebrities when the camp was divided and competing head-to-head, had to complete a gigantic obstacle course. If the celebrity completed the course they would win a 'slam' of meals for their celebrities and if they didn't they would leave with very little food or nothing. The new tucker trial was split into two main parts - The Course and The Slammer, with the time spent on the gauntlet would determine how steep the Slammer would be. There were a number of challenges in the obstacle course, including a slippery slide, an electric forest, a spinning turntable, twin spinning logs, a mole hole, 'feathering' chambers and the boulder dash.
- Superhero Sundays: In season 6, "Superhero Sundays" were introduced, which involved a group of celebrities participating in superhero themed trials each Sunday. These challenges include Dreadmill, The Scariest Trial We've Ever Done! and Buns of Steel.

=== Celebrity chest challenges ===
Any number of celebrities are chosen to take part in the celebrity chest challenge to win luxuries for camp. Each challenge involves completing a task to win a chest to take back to camp. However, to win the luxury item in the chest, the campmates must correctly answer a question. If they fail to answer correctly, the luxury item is forfeited and a joke prize is won. The luxury item is "donated" by a celebrity from the outside.

=== Secret mission ===
This is a challenge where some celebrities have to take part without alerting the other celebrities - if they are successful in their 'missions', they are rewarded.

=== Mystery box ===
A mystery box sees a box delivered to the campsite, each time containing a different gift for the contestants.

=== Immunity challenges ===
In season 5 immunity challenges were introduced for the first time in the series. These challenges were harder than the Bushtucker Trials and the celebrity that won the challenge couldn't be voted out of the jungle by the public.

=== Broadcast ===
The show is broadcast Sunday to Thursday at 7.30 pm, with a weekly eviction show on Sunday (except for the first week, where the celebrities arrive in the 'jungle'). All shows are presented by Julia Morris & Robert Irwin from a nearby studio. The program is live to AEDT States (New South Wales, Victoria, Tasmania and the Australian Capital Territory), in other states the program is delayed to accommodate local time zones. As season 8 is the first to air outside of Daylight Savings Time, Queensland will also receive the broadcast live alongside the South East states, with other states receiving a delayed broadcast.

=== The Fallout Zone ===
In addition to the television broadcast, for the first season a live feed from the camp site aired for an hour after the AEDT airing of the show on Ten's website and mobile app, titled The Fallout Zone but more commonly referred to as FOZ. The content of feed was available on the website after the fact so viewers in other states could watch the show after their airing of the main show. The feed was hosted by comedian Sam Mac and producer Ciaran "The Butcher" Flannery, also known as "The C-Word". On 8 and 12 March 2015, producer Dominic "The Domin8or" Sullivan filled in during Flannery's absence. The duo interact with viewers through Twitter, using the hashtag #FOZ. Mac and Flannery have no control over the shots used in the stream which has resulted in one episode featuring a 20-minute shot of a waterfall and, on 16 February 2015, a 15-minute conversation featuring a sound technician looking for Bob being picked up. On 5 March 2015 the show famously featured audio problems during which Mac and Flannery's voices fluctuated between chipmunk and Darth Vader filters for the first thirty minutes. The show's theme song is "Highway to the Fallout Zone" sung by Sam Mac. The show did not return for the second season.

=== Saturday Schoolies ===
In addition to the main broadcast, season 5 had a companion show hosted by Scott Tweedie, which aired on Network Ten on Saturdays at 7:00 pm called I'm A Celebrity: 'Saturday Schoolies'. The show involved all the celebrities in the jungle and was described as 'jungle detention'. Tweedie gave assignments, in the form of 'fun' games, to the celebrities which pushed them out of their comfort zones. The show was filmed on a classroom set in camp and the celebrities completed tasks to win the 'golden lunchbox', which included a number of school snacks such as an apple, dried mango, a muesli bar, biscuits, chips, chicken, a cheese & lettuce sandwich as well as juice.

=== Voting and elimination ===
==== Public voting ====
Throughout the show the public votes on who competes in the following tucker trial and whom to evict from the campsite. Viewers can either vote via SMS (by texting the name of the celebrity to 1995 1010) or vote via Social Media (namely Facebook or Twitter) by using the celebrity's hashtag (#celeb[name]). Voting via social media is limited to 20 votes per account. For tucker trial voting, viewers vote for celebrity they wish to compete. For eviction voting, viewers vote for a celebrity to stay. Voting closes at approximately 7:30pm AEDT for Sunday's eviction vote and at approximately 8pm AEDT for voting on other days.

Prior to the premiere of the second season, it was announced that the voting process would change slightly compared to the inaugural season. SMS voting was used for both trial and eviction voting while Twitter voting was used exclusively for trial voting. This change was implemented to even the playing field between celebrities with a larger international fan base (who are more likely to receive Twitter votes from said fan base) and celebrities with a smaller fan base who are only known in Australia. However, this decision was later reversed, allowing Twitter and Facebook votes for the finals.

==== Pre-recorded format ====
In season 7–8, the show was pre-recorded and did not feature public voting except for the finale, in which the final six celebrities faced a public vote to determine the winner, with the results revealed during a live reunion. Evictions were instead determined by challenges involving all the contestants.

In season 12, the show was again pre-recorded and did not involve public voting until the finale, where elimination trials were used again and the final three faced the public vote after multiple ending were filmed. During this season, the contestants nominated each other for each elimination challenge.

== Series overview ==
Winners crowned King or Queen of their respective year.

Key:

King of the Jungle
Queen of the Jungle

Season	Start date	End date	Days in camp	Campmates	Presenters		Network	Honour places		
Season	Start date	End date	Days in camp	Campmates	Presenters		Network	Winner	Second place	Third place
1	1 February 2015	15 March 2015	45	14	Chris	Julia	Ten	Freddie Flintoff	Barry Hall	Chrissie Swan
2	31 January 2016	13 March 2016	45	12	Chris	Julia	Ten	Brendan Fevola	Paul Harragon	Laurina Fleure
3	29 January 2017	13 March 2017	46	14	Chris	Julia	Ten	Casey Donovan	Dane Swan	Natalie Bassingthwaighte
4	28 January 2018	12 March 2018	45	15	Chris	Julia	Ten	Fiona O'Loughlin	Shannon Noll	Danny Green
5	13 January 2019	17 February 2019	33	14	Chris	Julia	Ten	Richard Reid	Yvie Jones	Shane Crawford
6	5 January 2020	2 February 2020	30	14	Chris	Julia	Ten	Miguel Maestre	Dale Thomas	Rhonda Burchmore
7	3 January 2021	31 January 2021	20	15	Chris	Julia	Ten	Abbie Chatfield	Grant Denyer	Jess Eva
8	3 January 2022	30 January 2022	20	13	Chris	Julia	Ten	Dylan Lewis	Brooke McClymont	Nathan Buckley
9	2 April 2023	30 April 2023	30	14	Chris	Julia	Ten	Liz Ellis	Harry Garside	Aesha Scott
10	24 March 2024	21 April 2024	30	12	Robert	Julia	Ten	Skye Wheatley	Tristan MacManus	Callum Hole
11	19 January 2025	16 February 2025	28	13	Robert	Julia	Ten	Sam Thaiday	Reggie Sorensen; Matty Johnson	
12	18 January 2026	22 February 2026	20	13	Robert	Julia	Ten	Concetta Caristo	Gary Sweet; Luke Bateman	
13	2027		TBA		Jim	Ricki-Lee	Seven	TBD		

== Series results ==
Key
Winner – King or Queen of the Jungle
Runner-up
Third place
Late arrival
Evicted
Withdrawn

=== Season 1 (2015) ===
Celebrity	Known for	Day Entered	Day Exited	Result
Andrew “Freddie” Flintoff	Cricketer	17	45	Winner
Barry Hall	Former AFL player	1	45	Runner-up
Chrissie Swan	TV & radio presenter	1	45	Third Place
Maureen McCormick	Actress (The Brady Bunch) & author	1	42	Eliminated 11th
Joel Creasey	Comedian	1	41	Eliminated 10th
Anna Heinrich	The Bachelor Australia Star	10	41	Eliminated 9th
Julie Goodwin	Chef	17	40	Eliminated 8th
Merv Hughes	Cricketer	1	39	Eliminated 7th
Tyson Mayr	Model	1	38	Eliminated 6th
Andrew Daddo	TV & radio presenter	1	31	Eliminated 5th
Lauren Brant	Singer & TV personality	1	24	Eliminated 4th
Laura Dundovic	Model	1	17	Eliminated 3rd
Tim Robards	Reality TV star	10	17	Eliminated 2nd
Leisel Jones	Olympic swimmer	1	10	Eliminated 1st

=== Season 2 (2016) ===
Celebrity	Known for	Day Entered	Day Exited	Result
Brendan Fevola	Former AFL player	1	45	Winner
Paul Harragon	Former NRL player	1	45	Runner-up
Laurina Fleure	The Bachelor Australia 2 Star	1	45	Third Place
Anthony Callea	Singer	1	42	Eliminated 9th
Shane Warne	Cricketer	2	41	Eliminated 8th
Havana Brown	DJ	1	40	Eliminated 7th
Jo Beth Taylor	Actress, singer & TV presenter	1	39	Eliminated 6th
Val Lehman	Actress	1	38	Eliminated 5th
Dean Geyer	Actor & singer	1	31	Eliminated 4th
Bonnie Lythgoe	TV personality	1	24	Eliminated 3rd
Akmal Saleh	Comedian	1	17	Eliminated 2nd
Courtney Hancock	Ironwoman	1	10	Eliminated 1st

=== Season 3 (2017) ===
Celebrity	Known for	Day Entered	Day Exited	Result
Casey Donovan	Singer	1	46	Winner
Dane Swan	AFL player	1	46	Runner-Up
Natalie Bassingthwaighte	Singer & actress	1	46	Third Place
Nazeem Hussain	Comedian	1	45	Eliminated 11th
Steve Price	Radio personality	1	42	Eliminated 10th
Lisa Curry	Olympic swimmer	1	41	Eliminated 9th
Ash Pollard	Reality TV star	1	40	Eliminated 8th
Carson Kressley	TV presenter	25	39	Eliminated 7th
Tegan Martin	Model	1	38	Eliminated 6th
Keira Maguire	Reality TV star	19	35	Eliminated 5th
Kris Smith	Model	2	35	Eliminated 4th
Tziporah Malkah	Model	2	31	Eliminated 3rd
Jay Laga'aia	Actor & singer	1	24	Eliminated 2nd
Tom Arnold	Actor & comedian	1	17	Eliminated 1st

=== Season 4 (2018) ===
Celebrity	Known for	Day Entered	Day Exited	Result
Fiona O'Loughlin	Comedian	1	45	Winner
Shannon Noll	Singer	1	45	Runner-up
Danny Green	Boxer	7	45	Third place
Vicky Pattison	Reality TV star (I'm a Celeb UK 15 winner)	17	44	Eliminated 10th
Simone Holtznagel	Model	1	41	Eliminated 9th
Peter Rowsthorn	Comedian	1	40	Eliminated 8th
Jackie Gillies	Psychic & TV personality	1	39	Eliminated 7th
Josh Gibson	AFL player	1	38	Eliminated 6th
Paul Burrell	Former Royal Butler (I'm a Celeb UK 4 runner up)	17	37	Eliminated 5th
Lisa Oldfield	Reality TV star	24	34	Eliminated 4th
David Oldfield	Former politician	24	30	Eliminated 3rd
Kerry Armstrong	Actress	1	23	Eliminated 2nd
Tiffany Darwish	Singer	1	16	Eliminated 1st
Anthony Mundine	Boxer	2	12	Withdrew
Bernard Tomic	Tennis player	1	3	Withdrew

=== Season 5 (2019) ===
Campers (Team Red)
Caretakers (Team Blue)
Intruder who entered after contestants were merged

Celebrity	Known for	Day Entered	Day Exited	Result
Richard Reid	TV personality	1	33^{2}	Winner
Yvie Jones	Reality TV star	3	33^{2}	Runner-Up
Shane Crawford	Former AFL player & TV personality	10	33^{2}	Third Place
Luke Jacobz	Actor & TV presenter	1	32	Eliminated 11th
Angie Kent	Reality TV star	3	32	Eliminated 10th
Justin Lacko	Model & reality TV star	1	31	Eliminated 9th
Natasha Exelby	Journalist	1	30	Eliminated 8th
Justine Schofield	Chef & TV presenter	1	27	Eliminated 7th
Tahir Bilgiç	Comedian	1	26	Eliminated 6th
Dermott Brereton	Former AFL player	1	25	Eliminated 5th
Katherine Kelly Lang	Actress	17	24	Eliminated 4th
Jacqui Lambie	Former politician^{3}	1	23	Eliminated 3rd
Sam Dastyari	Former politician	1	16	Eliminated 2nd
Ajay Rochester	TV presenter	1	11	Eliminated 1st

Notes

- ^1 Throughout the series the contestants were given the opportunity, through challenges, to swap teams. On Day 6 the contestants played a game called 'Escape Fartists' which allowed Luke, Richard and Angie to move onto the Red team, in exchange for Jacqui, Sam and Yvie's positions. Consequently, placing them these three celebrities on the Blue team.
- ^2 The Grand Final was recorded on Wednesday 13 February (Day 33), but due to scheduling Channel 10 aired the episodes on the following Sunday 17 February.
- ^3 When Lambie appeared in the show in 2019, she was not serving as a Senator. In the 2019 Federal Election, Lambie was re-elected to the Senate.

=== Season 6 (2020) ===
The sixth season was renewed on 7 February 2019 and returned on 5 January 2020.

Celebrity	Known for	Day Entered	Day Exited	Result
Miguel Maestre	Chef and TV presenter	1	30	Winner
Dale Thomas	AFL player	2	30	Runner-up
Rhonda Burchmore	Singer & actress	1	30	Third place
Cosentino	Illusionist & TV personality	8	27	Eliminated 11th
Charlotte Crosby	TV & media personality	1	26	Eliminated 10th
Myf Warhurst	TV & radio personality	1	25	Eliminated 9th
Ryan Gallagher	Former Married at First Sight star	1	25	Eliminated 8th
Perez Hilton	TV personality & blogger	16	24	Eliminated 7th
Tanya Hennessy	Social media personality & comedian	1	23	Eliminated 6th
Tom Williams	TV presenter	1	20	Eliminated 5th
Erin Barnett	Former Love Island Australia contestant	1	19	Eliminated 4th
Billy Brownless	Former AFL player	2	18	Eliminated 3rd
Nikki Osborne	Comedian	1	16	Eliminated 2nd
Dilruk Jayasinha	Comedian	1	13	Eliminated 1st

=== Season 7 (2021) ===
The seventh season was renewed on 11 May 2020 and premiered on 3 January 2021. It was the first series to be filmed in Australia and was pre-recorded due to the COVID-19 pandemic. In a format change (given the pre-recorded production), the celebrities were eliminated in Elimination Trials, with the winner still being determined by public vote between the final seven contestants.

Team Red
Team Blue
Team Green
Intruder who entered after contestants were merged

Celebrity	Known for	Day Entered	Day Exited	Result
Abbie Chatfield	Former The Bachelor Australia contestant	1	21	Winner
Grant Denyer	Television presenter	1	21	Runner-up
Jess Eva	Television & radio personality	1	21	Third place
Toni Pearen	Actress & singer-songwriter	1	21	Eliminated 11th
Colin Fassnidge	Chef	4	21	Eliminated 10th
Travis Varcoe	Former AFL player	1	21	Eliminated 9th
Ash Williams	Comedian	1	21	Eliminated 8th
Robert "Dipper" DiPierdomenico	Former AFL player	2	20	Eliminated 7th
Adam Densten	Reality TV star	12	20	Eliminated 6th
Paulini	Singer-songwriter	1	19	Eliminated 5th
Symon Lovett	Reality TV star	12	18	Eliminated 4th
Alli Simpson	Model, singer & actress	8	17	Eliminated 3rd
Pettifleur Berenger	Author & reality TV star	3	16	Eliminated 2nd
Jack Vidgen	Singer	1	11	Eliminated 1st
Mel Buttle	Comedian & TV presenter	1	4	Withdrew

=== Season 8 (2022) ===
The eighth season was renewed in August 2021 and premiered on 3 January 2022.

Team Red
Team Blue

Celebrity	Known for	Day Entered	Day Exited	Result
Dylan Lewis	Television presenter, radio host and actor	1	20	Winner
Brooke McClymont	Singer-songwriter	1	20	Runner-up
Nathan Buckley	Former AFL coach and player	1	20	Third place
Emily Seebohm	Olympic swimmer	1	20	Eliminated 9th
David Subritzky	Fake celebrity	1	20	Eliminated 8th
Joey Essex	Reality TV star	2	20	Eliminated 7th
Poh Ling Yeow	Television chef	1	19	Eliminated 6th
Cal Wilson	Comedian	1	18	Eliminated 5th
Tottie Goldsmith	Actress, singer, television & radio host	6	17	Eliminated 4th
Derek Kickett	Former AFL player	1	16	Eliminated 3rd
Maria Thattil	Model	1	15	Eliminated 2nd
Beau Ryan	Former NRL player and TV presenter	1	14	Withdrew
Davina Rankin	Former Married at First Sight star	3	10	Eliminated 1st

=== Season 9 (2023) ===
The ninth season was renewed in October 2022 and premiered on 2 April 2023. The series was the first since the COVID-19 pandemic in 2020 to return to a live broadcast in its original South African filming location. It was also the last season with Chris Brown as a host, following his announcement that he had signed with the Seven Network and would join the network from July 2023.

Celebrity	Known for	Day Entered	Day Exited	Result
Liz Ellis	Former netball player	1	30	Winner
Harry Garside	Lightweight boxer	1	30	Runner-up
Aesha Scott	Below Deck Mediterranean and Below Deck Down Under star	1	30	Third place
Nathan Henry	Reality TV star	1	27	Eliminated 10th
Adam Cooney	Former AFL player	1	27	Eliminated 9th
Woody Whitelaw	Radio presenter	1	26	Eliminated 8th
Peter Helliar	Comedian & television presenter	1	25	Eliminated 7th
Domenica Calarco	Former Married at First Sight star	1	24	Eliminated 6th
Debra Lawrance	Actress	1	23	Eliminated 5th
Nick Cummins	Former Rugby player & reality TV star	9	20	Eliminated 4th
Ian "Dicko" Dickson	Music executive & television personality	1	19	Eliminated 3rd
Bianca Hunt	Television presenter	1	16	Eliminated 2nd
Anna Polyviou	Chef	1	16	Eliminated 1st
Kerri-Anne Kennerley	Television presenter	2	5	Withdrew

=== Season 10 (2024) ===
Season 10 premiered on 24 March 2024, with Robert Irwin hosting alongside Julia Morris. On 31 March the celebrities were divided into two teams:

Team Julia
Team Robert

Celebrity	Known for	Day Entered	Day Exited	Result
Skye Wheatley	Reality TV star and Social Media Influencer	1	30	Winner
Tristan MacManus	TV Host and Dancer	1	30	Runner-Up
Callum Hole	Reality TV Star	1	30	Third Place
Brittany Hockley	Radio Host	1	27	Eliminated 8th
Ellie Cole	Paralympic Gold Medalist	1	27	Eliminated 7th
Stephen K. Amos	Comedian	1	26	Eliminated 6th
Khanh Ong	Chef	1	25	Eliminated 5th
Peter Daicos	Former AFL player	1	24	Eliminated 4th
Michelle Bridges	Fitness Guru	1	23	Eliminated 3rd
Frankie Muniz	Malcolm in the Middle star	1	21	Withdrew
Candice Warner	Ironwoman	1	20	Eliminated 2nd
Denise Drysdale	Entertainer	7	19	Eliminated 1st

=== Season 11 (2025) ===
The eleventh series was renewed in September 2024 and premiered on 19 January 2025.

Celebrity	Known for	Day Entered	Day Exited	Result
Sam Thaiday	Former NRL player	1	28	Winner
Reggie Sorensen	Big Brother winner	1	28	Runners-Up
Matty Johnson	Media personality	1	28	Runners-Up
Max Balegde	TikTok star	1	27	Eliminated 10th
Geraldine Hickey	Comedian	1	27	Eliminated 9th
Harrison Reid	Bondi Rescue lifeguard	2	26	Eliminated 8th
Zach Tuohy	Former AFL player	1	26	Eliminated 7th
Dave Hughes	Comedian	1	25	Eliminated 6th
Tina Provis	Former Love Island Australia contestant	1	24	Eliminated 5th
Sigrid Thornton	Actor	6	24	Eliminated 4th
Shayna Jack	Olympic swimmer	1	23	Eliminated 3rd
Nicky Buckley	Television presenter and model	1	20	Eliminated 2nd
Samantha Moitzi	Former Married at First Sight contestant	1	16	Eliminated 1st

=== Season 12 (2026) ===
The eleventh series was renewed in November 2025 and premiered on 18 January 2026.

Green Team (Captained and chosen by Cyrell)
Gold Team (Captained and chosen by Gary)

Celebrity	Known for	Day Entered	Day Exited	Result
Concetta Caristo	Radio host	1	20	Winner
Gary Sweet	Actor	1	20	Runners-Up
Luke Bateman	Former NRL player and reality TV star	1	20	Runners-Up
Rebekah Elmaloglou	Actress	1	19	Eliminated 8th
Nath Valvo	Stand-up comedian	1	19	Eliminated 8th
Cyrell Paule	Former Married at First Sight contestant	1 (4)	18	Eliminated 7th
George Calombaris	Chef	5	17	Eliminated 6th
Mia Fevola	Internet personality	1	16	Eliminated 5th
Dyson Heppell	Former AFL player	1	15	Eliminated 4th
Barry Williams	The Brady Bunch actor	1	13	Eliminated 3rd
Matt Zukowski	Former Love Island Australia contestant	1 (4)	11	Eliminated 2nd
Rachel Hunter	Model	1	8	Eliminated 1st
Deni Hines	Singer	1	7	Withdrew

- ^4 While Cyrell and Matt were introduced to the show during Episode 2, they had entered the Elephants' Graveyard camp on Day 1, before joining the rest of the celebrities in the main camp.

== Ratings ==
Season	Episodes	Premiere					Finale					Average Rating	Source
Season	Episodes	Premiere date	Premiere viewers (Opening Night)	Rank	Premiere viewers (Welcome to the Jungle)	Rank	Finale date	Finale viewers (Grand final)	Rank	Finale viewers (Winner announced)	Rank	Average Rating	Source
1	31	1 February 2015	1,199,000	4	1,136,000	5	15 March 2015	999,000	8	1,144,000	3	703,000	
2	31	31 January 2016	1,324,000	3	1,081,000	5	13 March 2016	719,000	8	858,000	6	732,000	
3	32	29 January 2017	1,103,000	7	963,000	8	13 March 2017	989,000	6	1,056,000	2	780,000	
4	31	28 January 2018	1,274,000	4	1,108,000	5	12 March 2018	684,000	11	804,000	8	652,000	
5	24 + 4	13 January 2019	1,098,000	1	1,014,000	2	17 February 2019	684,000	7	894,000	5	673,000	
6	21	5 January 2020	980,000	2	873,000	4	2 February 2020	803,000	6	884,000	5	731,000	
7	20	3 January 2021	1,031,000	1	914,000	2	31 January 2021	784,000	5	896,000	2	736,000	
8	20	3 January 2022	794,000	5	750,000	6	30 January 2022	576,000	7	617,000	6	580,000	
9	21	2 April 2023	570,000	6	596,000	5	30 April 2023	562,000	4	592,000	3	457,000	
10	21	24 March 2024	806,000	6	—N/a		21 April 2024	749,000	5	—N/a		637,000	
11	21	19 January 2025	905,000	7	—N/a		16 February 2025	651,000	6	—N/a		587,000	
12	21	18 January 2026	925,000	6	—N/a		22 February 2026	571,000	16	—N/a		621,000	

== Awards and nominations ==
Year	Award	Category	Recipients and nominees	Result	Refs.
2016	58th Logie Awards	Best Reality Program	I'm a Celebrity...Get Me Out of Here!	Nominated	
2017	59th Logie Awards	Best Reality Program	I'm a Celebrity...Get Me Out of Here!	Nominated	
2018	60th Logie Awards	Most Popular Reality Program	I'm a Celebrity...Get Me Out of Here!	Nominated	
2019	61st Logie Awards	Most Popular Reality Program	I'm a Celebrity...Get Me Out of Here!	Nominated	
2019	61st Logie Awards	Most Popular Presenter	Julia Morris	Nominated	
2020	10th AACTA Awards	Best Reality Program	I'm a Celebrity...Get Me Out of Here!	Nominated	
2022	62nd Logie Awards	Most Popular Personality	Julia Morris	Nominated	
2022	62nd Logie Awards	Most Outstanding Reality Program	I'm a Celebrity...Get Me Out of Here!	Won	
2022	62nd Logie Awards	Most Popular Reality Program	I'm a Celebrity...Get Me Out of Here!	Nominated	
2022	12th AACTA Awards	Best Reality Program	I'm a Celebrity...Get Me Out of Here!	Nominated	
2023	63rd Logie Awards	Most Popular Personality	Julia Morris	Nominated	
2023	63rd Logie Awards	Most Popular Presenter	Julia Morris	Nominated	
2023	63rd Logie Awards	Most Popular Reality Program	I'm a Celebrity...Get Me Out of Here!	Nominated	
2023	63rd Logie Awards	Most Outstanding Reality Program	I'm a Celebrity...Get Me Out of Here!	Nominated	

== Lawsuit ==
In June 2017, Tom Arnold filed a lawsuit against Network Ten and A List Entertainment for defrauding him for being on I'm a Celebrity...Get Me Out of Here!. Arnold claims that he was promised a payment of $425,000 and a comedy tour in Australia, however he was missing $140,000 in payment and that Network Ten backed out of the comedy tour.

== See also ==
- I'm a Celebrity...Get Me Out of Here! franchise
- I'm a Celebrity...Get Me Out of Here! (American TV series)
- I'm a Celebrity...Get Me Out of Here! (British TV series)
