= Logie Awards of 2019 =

Australian television awards ceremony

61st Logie Awards
- Date: 30 June 2019
- Site: The Star Gold Coast, Queensland

Highlights
- Gold Logie: Tom Gleeson
- Hall of Fame: Kerry O'Brien
- Most awards: Bloom, Gardening Australia, Have You Been Paying Attention? and Mystery Road (2)
- Most nominations: Mystery Road (8)

Television coverage
- Network: Nine Network

The 61st Annual TV Week Logie Awards ceremony was held at The Star Gold Coast in Queensland and was broadcast live on the Nine Network. Public voting for the Most Popular Award categories ran from 4 to 31 March 2019, with the shortlist of nominees released on 26 May.

Each network is restricted in the number of personalities and programs they can submit for consideration in the publicly voted category, including up to 10 names in both the Most Popular Actor and Actress categories, 15 names for Most Popular Presenter, and 5 programs for Most Popular Drama. These restrictions on nominations often lead to controversy as being widely panned for the second consecutive year over those who are not listed in the voting form, and as a result, they are not eligible to be nominated for an award.

== Nominees ==
Nominees were announced on 26 May 2019.

=== Gold Logie ===
Most Popular Personality on Australian Television
- Tom Gleeson in Hard Quiz (ABC)
  - Amanda Keller in The Living Room (Network Ten) and Dancing with the Stars (Network Ten)
  - Costa Georgiadis in Gardening Australia (ABC)
  - Eve Morey in Neighbours (Network Ten)
  - Rodger Corser in Doctor Doctor (Nine Network)
  - Sam Mac in Sunrise (Seven Network)
  - Waleed Aly in The Project (Network Ten)

=== Acting/Presenting ===
Most Popular Actor	Most Popular Actress
Luke McGregor in Rosehaven (ABC); Aaron Pedersen in Mystery Road (ABC); Guy Pearce in Jack Irish (ABC); Ray Meagher in Home and Away (Seven Network); Rodger Corser in Doctor Doctor (Nine Network); Ryan Moloney in Neighbours (Network Ten)	Deborah Mailman in Bite Club (Nine Network) and Mystery Road (ABC); Asher Keddie in The Cry (ABC); Celia Pacquola in Rosehaven (ABC); Eve Morey in Neighbours (Network Ten); Jenna Coleman in The Cry (ABC); Marta Dusseldorp in A Place to Call Home (Foxtel) and Jack Irish (ABC)
Most Outstanding Actor	Most Outstanding Actress
Scott Ryan in Mr Inbetween (Foxtel); Aaron Pedersen in Mystery Road (ABC); Bryan Brown in Bloom (Stan); Jay Ryan in Fighting Season (Foxtel); Robbie Magasiva in Wentworth (Foxtel)	Jenna Coleman in The Cry (ABC); Danielle Cormack in Secret City: Under the Eagle (Foxtel); Judy Davis in Mystery Road (ABC); Leah Purcell in Wentworth (Foxtel); Nicole Chamoun in On the Ropes (SBS)
Most Outstanding Supporting Actor	Most Outstanding Supporting Actress
Frankie J. Holden in A Place to Call Home (Foxtel); Bernard Curry in Wentworth (Foxtel); Ewen Leslie in Fighting Season (Foxtel); Ian Meadows in Dead Lucky (SBS); Wayne Blair in Mystery Road (ABC)	Jacki Weaver in Bloom (Stan); Asher Keddie in The Cry (ABC); Celia Ireland in Wentworth (Foxtel); Keisha Castle-Hughes in On the Ropes (SBS); Susie Porter in The Second (Stan)
Graham Kennedy Award for Most Popular New Talent	Most Popular Presenter
Dylan Alcott in The Set (ABC); Bonnie Anderson in Neighbours (Network Ten); Courtney Miller in Home and Away (Seven Network); Eddie Woo in Teenage Boss (ABC); Joe Jonas in The Voice (Nine Network); Tasia Zalar in Mystery Road (ABC)	Costa Georgiadis in Gardening Australia (ABC); Amanda Keller in The Living Room (Network Ten) and Dancing with the Stars (Network Ten); Carrie Bickmore in The Project (Network Ten); Julia Morris in Blind Date (Network Ten), I'm a Celebrity...Get Me Out of Here! (Network Ten) and Chris & Julia's Sunday Night Takeaway (Network Ten); Tom Gleeson in Hard Quiz (ABC); Waleed Aly in The Project (Network Ten)

=== Most Popular Programs ===
Most Popular Drama Program	Most Popular Entertainment Program
Mystery Road (ABC); Doctor Doctor (Nine Network); Home and Away (Seven Network); Neighbours (Network Ten); The Cry (ABC); Wentworth (Foxtel)	Gogglebox Australia (Foxtel/Network Ten); Anh's Brush with Fame (ABC); Dancing with the Stars (Network Ten); Gruen (ABC); Hard Quiz (ABC); The Voice (Nine Network)
Most Popular Reality Program	Most Popular Lifestyle Program
MasterChef Australia (Network Ten); Australian Survivor: Champions vs. Contenders (Network Ten); I'm a Celebrity...Get Me Out of Here! (Network Ten); Married at First Sight (Nine Network); My Kitchen Rules (Seven Network); The Block (Nine Network)	Gardening Australia (ABC); Back In Time For Dinner (ABC); Better Homes and Gardens (Seven Network); Selling Houses Australia (Foxtel); The Living Room (Network Ten); Travel Guides (Nine Network)
Most Popular Comedy Program	Most Popular Panel or Current Affairs Program
Have You Been Paying Attention? (Network Ten); Hughesy, We Have a Problem (Network Ten); Rosehaven (ABC); Russell Coight’s All Aussie Adventures (Network Ten); Shaun Micallef's Mad as Hell (ABC); True Story with Hamish & Andy (Nine Network)	The Project (Network Ten); 7.30 (ABC); 60 Minutes (Nine Network); A Current Affair (Nine Network); Australian Story (ABC); Four Corners (ABC)
Most Popular Commercial
Dundee: Australia's Tourism Ad In Disguise (Tourism Australia); Frank (Westpac); I Am The Captain Of My Own Soul (Invictus Games); Naked Wrestling (KFC); Santa Crashes Christmas (Aldi); Serena Project: I Touch Myself (Berlei)

=== Most Outstanding Programs ===
Most Outstanding Drama Series	Most Outstanding Miniseries or Telemovie
Wentworth (Foxtel); Doctor Doctor (Nine Network); Mystery Road (ABC); Neighbours (Network Ten); Secret City: Under the Eagle (Foxtel)	Bloom (Stan); Olivia Newton-John: Hopelessly Devoted to You (Seven Network); On the Ropes (SBS); Pine Gap (ABC); The Cry (ABC)
Most Outstanding Sports Coverage	Most Outstanding Factual or Documentary Program
2018 FIFA World Cup (SBS); Australia Vs India: Second Test In Perth (Foxtel); 2018 Commonwealth Games (Seven Network); 2018 Invictus Games (ABC); Supercars Championship: Bathurst (Network Ten)	Ron Iddles: The Good Cop (Foxtel); Employable Me (ABC); Exposed: The Case Of Keli Lane (ABC); Taboo (Network Ten); The Pacific – In The Wake Of Captain Cook With Sam Neill (Foxtel)
Most Outstanding Reality Program	Most Outstanding Entertainment Program
Australian Survivor: Champions vs. Contenders (Network Ten); House Rules (Seven Network); Married at First Sight (Nine Network); MasterChef Australia (Network Ten); The Block (Nine Network)	Have You Been Paying Attention? (Network Ten); Australian Ninja Warrior (Nine Network); Eurovision – Australia Decides 2018 (SBS); Gogglebox Australia (Foxtel/Network Ten); True Story with Hamish & Andy (Nine Network)
Most Outstanding Children's Program	Most Outstanding News Coverage or Public Affairs Report
Bluey (ABC); Grace Beside Me (SBS/NITV); Mustangs FC (ABC); Teenage Boss (ABC); The Bureau of Magical Things (Network Ten)	"Out Of The Dark" (Four Corners, ABC); "James Comey Interview" (7.30, ABC); "Leadership Spill" (Sky News, Foxtel); "Townsville Flood Disaster" (Seven News, Seven Network); "Who Cares?" (Four Corners, ABC)

== Changes to the ceremony ==
The 2019 ceremony saw the introduction of two new industry-voted awards: Most Outstanding Reality Program and Most Popular TV Commercial. The awards for Most Popular Panel or Current Affairs Program and Most Outstanding Entertainment Program also returned after being absent from the 2018 Logies.

== Presenters ==
- Tom Gleeson
- Hamish Blake & Andy Lee
- Waleed Aly
- Tracy Grimshaw
- Scott Tweedie
- Julia Morris

== Performers ==
- Guy Sebastian — Before I Go, Battle Scars, Choir
- Jessica Mauboy — Little Things
- Delta Goodrem — Greatest Hits Medley: Sitting On Top Of The World, Wings, In This Life, Lost Without You, Born To Try, Physical
- Why Don't We — I Don't Belong in This Club

== In Memoriam ==
The In Memoriam segment was introduced by Tracy Grimshaw paying tribute to Mike Willesee. A clip of Geoff Harvey playing the piano was played. The following deceased were honoured:

- Jimmy Hannan, singer and entertainer
- Penny Cook, actress
- Mike Williamson, broadcaster
- Judy McBurney, actress
- Michael Audcent, executive
- Valerie Nelson, stylist
- Shane Senior, executive
- Carol Burke, presenter
- Jim Murphy, presenter
- Ian Johnson, executive
- Jackie Martin, supervising post producer
- Andrew Prowse, director
- Paula Zorgdrager, editor
- Sam Chisholm, executive
- Ron Casey, broadcaster
- Carmen Duncan, actress
- Quentin Kenihan, writer, producer
- Trish Ramsay, executive
- Terry McDermott, actor
- Peter Ross, presenter
- Eleanor Witcombe, writer
- Damian Hill, actor
- Paul Blackwell, actor
- Mick Turski, camera
- Melissa Attard, graphics supervisor
- Chris Eichler, audio
- Darius Perkins, actor
- John Bluthal, actor
- Ian Jones, writer, director
- John Proper, producer
- Harry M. Miller, producer, talent manager
- Ross Crabtree, camera
- Jerry Thomas, actor
- Josh Murphy, news reporter
- Rod Myers, staging
- Roland Sampson, camera
- Tony Featherstone, announcer
- David Johnson, broadcast operators
- Bryan Marshall, actor
- Barry Spicer, newsreader
- Billy J. Smith, broadcaster
- Annalise Braakensiek, actress
- Bill Collins, presenter
- Geoff Harvey, musical director
