= Symon Lovett =

Australian television personality

- Born: Australia
- Employer(s): Network 10, LISTNR
- Known for: Gogglebox Australia, I’m A Celebrity…Get Me Out Of Here!

Symon Lovett is an Australian television personality and podcaster known for appearing alongside his friend Adam Densten on the Australian reality television program Gogglebox.

== Television and podcast ==
Lovett started appearing as a main cast member on Gogglebox Australia when it started. He and Densten left the show after the tenth season, but returned for the fourteenth season onwards.

In January 2021, Lovett and Densten appeared as contestants on the seventh season of I'm A Celebrity...Get Me Out Of Here!. They were the last celebrities to enter the jungle and Lovett was the third contestant to be eliminated.

Later that year, Lovett and Densten launched The Adam And Symon Show, a podcast on LISTNR.

=== Appearances ===
- Gogglebox Australia (2015-2019, 2021-)
- I’m A Celebrity…Get Me Out Of Here! Australia (2021)
