= Logie Award for Most Outstanding Reality Program =

- Country: Australia
- Presented by: TV Week
- First award: 2019
- Currently held by: Australian Survivor: Heroes v Villains (2023)
- Website: www.tvweeklogieawards.com.au

The Silver Logie for Most Outstanding Reality Program is an award presented annually at the Australian TV Week Logie Awards. The award is given to recognise an outstanding Australian reality television program. The winner and nominees of this award are chosen by television industry juries. It was first awarded at the 61st Annual TV Week Logie Awards ceremony, held in 2019.

== Winner and Nominees ==
Listed below are the winners, as well as their nominees, for each year.

Key	Meaning
‡	Indicates the winning program

Year	Program	Network	Ref
2019	Australian Survivor: Champions vs. Contenders‡	Network Ten	
2019	House Rules	Seven Network	
2019	Married At First Sight	Nine Network	
2019	MasterChef Australia	Network Ten	
2019	The Block	Nine Network	
2022	I'm a Celebrity...Get Me Out of Here!‡	Network Ten	
2022	Beauty and the Geek	Nine Network	
2022	The Celebrity Apprentice Australia	Nine Network	
2022	MasterChef Australia	Network Ten	
2022	SAS Australia	Seven Network	
2023	Australian Survivor: Heroes v Villains‡	Network Ten	
2023	Hunted Australia	Network Ten	
2023	I'm a Celebrity...Get Me Out of Here!	Network Ten	
2023	Married at First Sight	Nine Network	
2023	MasterChef Australia: Fans & Favourites	Network Ten	
2023	The Block	Nine Network	

== See also ==
- Logie Award for Most Popular Reality Program
