= Adam Densten =

Television personality

- Born: Adam James Densten; 31 July 1990 (age 36); Corowa, New South Wales, Australia
- Occupations: Television presenter, podcaster, physiotherapist
- Years active: 2015–present
- Known for: Gogglebox Australia, I'm a Celebrity...Get Me Out of Here! (Australian TV series)

Adam James Densten (born 31 July 1990) is an Australian television personality and podcaster known for appearing alongside his friend Symon Lovett in the Australian reality television program Gogglebox.

== Television and podcasts ==
Densten started appearing as a main cast member on Gogglebox when it first started. However after the tenth season, he and Lovett decided to leave the show but returned to the show for its fourteenth season. They have remained on the show since then.

In January 2021, Densten and Lovett appeared as contestants on the seventh season of I’m A Celebrity…Get Me Out Of Here! Australia they were the last celebrities to enter the jungle and Densten was the seventh contestant to be eliminated.

Later that year, Densten and Lovett launched a podcast on LISTNR called The Adam And Symon Show.

=== Appearances ===
- Gogglebox Australia (2015-2019, 2021-)
- I’m A Celebrity…Get Me Out Of Here! Australia (2021)
