= I'm a Celebrity...Get Me Out of Here! (Australian TV series) season 2 =

I'm a Celebrity...Get Me Out of Here!
- Season 2
- Hosted by: Chris Brown and Julia Morris
- No. of days: 45
- No. of contestants: 12
- Winner: Brendan Fevola
- Runner-up: Paul Harragon
- Location: Kruger National Park, South Africa
- Companion show: I'm a Celebrity...Get Me Out of Here! Now!
- No. of episodes: 31

Release
- Original network: Network Ten
- Original release: 31 January – 13 March 2016

Series chronology
- ← Previous; Season 1 Next → Season 3

The second season of I'm a Celebrity...Get Me Out of Here, which was commissioned on 16 July 2015, premiered on Network Ten on 31 January 2016. The season was won by Brendan Fevola who received $100,000 for his charity, and gave half ($50,000) to Paul Harragon's charity.

== Celebrities ==
Celebrity	Known for	Status	Source
Brendan Fevola	Former AFL player	Winner on 13 March 2016	
Paul Harragon	Former NRL player	Runner-up on 13 March 2016	
Laurina Fleure	The Bachelor Australia 2 star	Third Place on 13 March 2016	
Anthony Callea	Singer-songwriter	Eliminated 9th on 10 March 2016	
Shane Warne	Retired international cricketer	Eliminated 8th on 9 March 2016	
Havana Brown	DJ	Eliminated 7th on 8 March 2016	
Jo Beth Taylor	Television presenter	Eliminated 6th on 7 March 2016	
Val Lehman	Prisoner actress	Eliminated 5th on 6 March 2016	
Dean Geyer	Glee actor & singer	Eliminated 4th on 28 February 2016	
Bonnie Lythgoe	So You Think You Can Dance Australia judge	Eliminated 3rd on 21 February 2016	
Akmal Saleh	Comedian	Eliminated 2nd on 14 February 2016	
Courtney Hancock	Ironwoman	Eliminated 1st on 7 February 2016	

=== Guest celebrities ===
Celebrity	Known for	Source
Terri, Bindi and Robert Irwin	Zoologists & television presenters	
Ryan 'Fitzy' Fitzgerald and Michael 'Wippa' Wipfli	Radio personalities	
Sandra Sully	Ten Eyewitness News news presenter	

== Results and elimination ==
Indicates that the celebrity received the most votes from the public
Indicates that the celebrity received the fewest votes and was eliminated immediately (no bottom two)
Indicates that the celebrity was named as being in the bottom 2, or bottom 3

Elimination results per celebrity
Celebrity	Week 1	Week 2	Week 3	Week 4	Week 5	Week 6				Grand Finale	Number of Trials
Celebrity	Week 1	Week 2	Week 3	Week 4	Week 5	Day 39	Day 40	Day 41	Day 42	Grand Finale	Number of Trials
Brendan	Safe	Bottom three	Safe	Safe	Safe	Safe	Bottom three	Bottom three	Bottom two	Winner (Day 45)	9
Paul	Safe	Safe	Safe	Safe	Bottom three	Safe	Safe	Safe	Safe	Runner-up (Day 45)	9
Laurina	Safe	Safe	Safe	Safe	Safe	Safe	Safe	Bottom three	Safe	Third Place (Day 45)	13
Anthony	Safe	Safe	Safe	Safe	Safe	Safe	Safe	Safe	Bottom two	Eliminated (Day 42)	8
Shane	Safe	Safe	Safe	Safe	Safe	Bottom three	Bottom three	Bottom three	Eliminated (Day 41)		7
Havana	Safe	Safe	Bottom three	Safe	Safe	Bottom three	Bottom three	Eliminated (Day 40)			6
Jo Beth	Bottom three	Safe	Bottom three	Bottom three	Bottom three	Bottom three	Eliminated (Day 39)				7
Val	Safe	Bottom three	Safe	Bottom three	Bottom three	Eliminated (Day 38)					6
Dean	Bottom three	Safe	Safe	Bottom three	Eliminated (Day 31)						5
Bonnie	Safe	Safe	Bottom three	Eliminated (Day 24)							3
Akmal	Safe	Bottom three	Eliminated (Day 17)								2
Courtney	Bottom three	Eliminated (Day 10)									1
Bottom two/ three	Courtney, Dean, Jo Beth	Akmal, Brendan, Val	Bonnie, Havana, Jo Beth	Dean, Jo Beth, Val	Jo Beth, Paul, Val	Havana, Jo Beth, Shane	Brendan, Havana, Shane	Brendan, Laurina, Shane	Anthony, Brendan	None	
Eliminated	Courtney; Fewest votes to save	Akmal; Fewest votes to save	Bonnie; Fewest votes to save	Dean; Fewest votes to save	Val; Fewest votes to save	Jo Beth; Fewest votes to save	Havana; Fewest votes to save	Shane; Fewest votes to save	Anthony; Fewest votes to save	Laurina; Fewest votes to win (out of 3)	
Eliminated	Courtney; Fewest votes to save	Akmal; Fewest votes to save	Bonnie; Fewest votes to save	Dean; Fewest votes to save	Val; Fewest votes to save	Jo Beth; Fewest votes to save	Havana; Fewest votes to save	Shane; Fewest votes to save	Anthony; Fewest votes to save	Paul; Fewest votes to win (out of 3)	
Eliminated	Courtney; Fewest votes to save	Akmal; Fewest votes to save	Bonnie; Fewest votes to save	Dean; Fewest votes to save	Val; Fewest votes to save	Jo Beth; Fewest votes to save	Havana; Fewest votes to save	Shane; Fewest votes to save	Anthony; Fewest votes to save	Brendan; Most votes to win	

== Tucker Trials ==
The contestants take part in daily trials to earn food. These trials aim to test both physical and mental abilities. Success is usually determined by the number of stars collected during the trial, with each star representing a meal earned by the winning contestant for their camp mates.

The public voted for who they wanted to face the trial
The contestants decided who did which trial
The trial was compulsory and neither the public nor celebrities decided who took part
The contestants were chosen by the evicted celebrities

Trial number	Air date	Name of trial	Celebrity participation	Number of stars/Winner(s)	Notes	Source
1	31 January	Guts Or Glory	Akmal; Anthony; Bonnie; Brendan; Courtney; Dean; Havana; Jo Beth; Laurina; Paul; Val	Brendan; Dean; Havana; Jo Beth; Laurina; Val	None	
2	1 February	Up To Your Neck In It	Brendan; Shane	12/12 stars	1	
3	2 February	Spin The Bottle	Anthony; Dean; Laurina; Shane	8/12 stars	None	
4	3 February	Cliff Hanger	Laurina	9/12 stars	None	
5	4 February	The Viper Room	Laurina	12/12 stars	None	
6	7 February	Croc Bait	Akmal; Laurina	1/12 stars	None	
7	8 February	Feeding Time	Anthony; Havana	9/11 stars	None	
8	9 February	Beat The Birds	Paul	8/11 stars	None	
9	10 February	World's End	Jo Beth	6/11 stars	None	
10	11 February	Feral Foot Fetish	Jo Beth	7/11 stars	None	
11	14 February	Creepy Callies	Bonnie; Jo Beth; Val	8/11 stars	None	
12	15 February	Shaken And Stirred	Dean	8/10 stars	None	
13	16 February	Pub Crawl	Jo Beth; Laurina	6/10 stars	None	
14	17 February	Tug of War	Anthony; Bonnie; Brendan; Dean; Havana; Jo Beth; Laurina; Paul; Shane; Val	Dean; Jo Beth; Laurina; Paul; Val	None	
15	18 February	In Your Face	Shane	9/10 stars	None	
16	21 February	Mineshaft Misery	Anthony; Shane	9/10 stars	None	
17	22 February	Sticky Wiki	Havana; Laurina; Paul	6/9 stars	None	
18	23 February	Fast Food	Jo Beth; Laurina; Shane; Val	5/9 stars	None	
19	24 February	Blind Date	Laurina; Val	7/9 stars	None	
20	25 February	Memorable Trip	Brendan; Dean	5/9 stars	None	
21	28 February	Hole Lotta Trouble	Anthony	8/9 stars	None	
22	29 February	Screaming Headache	Paul	0/8 stars	2	
23	1 March	Ropable	Paul; Wippa	2/8 stars	3	
24	2 March	Wreck-fast	Havana	6/8 stars	4	
24	2 March	Wreck-fast	Brendan	6/8 stars	4	
25	3 March	Jungle Houdini	Laurina	7/8 stars	5	
26	6 March	Dam Shame	Val	8/8 stars		
27	7 March	Wheel of Misfortune	Havana	3/7 stars		
28	8 March	Hipster Horror	Brendan; Paul	6/6 stars	6	
29	9 March	Mind The Gap	Anthony; Brendan; Laurina; Paul; Shane	4/5 stars		
30	10 March	Flash Flood 2.0: Flash Harder	Anthony; Brendan	4/4 stars		
31	13 March	Dam Busters	Brendan; Laurina; Paul	0/3 stars	7	

- ^1 Shane chose Brendan to participate in this trial with him
- ^2 Radio hosts Fitzy and Wippa entered as guests and disguised themselves as rangers, they sabotaged Paul's tucker trial so he wouldn't win any stars, but later in camp, Fitzy and Wippa gave the camp 10 stars worth of food & wine
- ^3 As a prank by Fitzy, Wippa was temporarily a camp member and had to participate in this tucker trial
- ^4 When Wippa was evicted from the jungle, he chose Brendan to participate with Havana in this tucker trial
- ^5 This being Laurina's 11th tucker trial will make Laurina the World Record holder of the most tucker trials completed by a person. The record was previously held by former American model Janice Dickinson, who completed 10 tucker trials on the seventh series of the British version. Nazeem Hussain later beat Laurina with 14 trials.
- ^6 Brendan also won a special red star in this tucker trial. The red star, which was another world-first record, gave the celebrities several condiments to add flavor to their meal
- ^7All of the celebrities failed at trying to receive a star, but Julia Morris tried a go at receiving at least one star for the campers, unfortunately she also failed but the campers received three stars anyway

== Celebrity Chest Challenges ==
Two or more celebrities are chosen to take part in the "Celebrity Chest" challenge to win luxuries for camp. Each challenge involves completing a task to win a chest to take back to camp. However, to win the luxury item in the chest, the campmates must correctly answer a question. If they fail to answer correctly, the luxury item is forfeited and a joke prize is won. The luxury item is "donated" by a celebrity from the outside.

The celebrities got the question correct
The celebrities got the question wrong

Episode	Air date	Chest challenge	Celebrity participation	Celebrity prize donor	Prize	Note	Source
3	2 February	Dumbo	Akmal, Bonnie	Olivia Newton-John	Chocolate Covered Peanuts		
7	9 February	Guess Poo	Brendan, Dean	The Irwin family	Chocolate Koalas	8	
13	16 February	Rhino Rescue	Havana, Paul	Anh Do	Bread and Cheese		
25	3 March	Moholoholo	Val, Shane	James Corden	Cheezels		

- ^8 Brendan and Dean had to guess all correct to be able to take the celebrity chest. One mistake would have resulted in them losing the chance to have the celebrity chest.

== Trick or Treat ==
Two or more celebrities are chosen to take part in the challenge to win luxuries for camp. The campmates must correctly answer a question

The celebrities got the question correct
The celebrities got the question wrong

Episode	Air date	Trick or Treat Challenge	Celebrity participation	Prize	Notes	Source
4	3 February	Cheese or Tease	Akmal, Bonnie, Anthony, Courtney, Paul; Jo Beth, Val, Brendan, Havana, Dean, Laurina	Cheese Platter		
9	10 February	Self-Destructing Cake	Akmal, Bonnie, Anthony, Paul, Jo Beth, Val, Brendan, Havana, Dean, Laurina	Cake	Challenge was solved after time limit.	
14	17 February	The Bacon Equation	Bonnie, Anthony, Paul, Jo Beth, Val, Brendan, Havana, Dean, Laurina	Bacon	Challenge was solved after time limit.	

== Camp Leader ==
Each celebrity in camp must vote for who they want to be Camp Leader, the celebrity who receives the most votes becomes the new Camp Leader.

Celebrity automatically became Camp Leader
Voted in as Camp Leader
Lost Camp Leadership

Camp Leader
Celebrity	No. of Votes	
Celebrity	^1st	^2nd
Paul	—	4
Shane	CL	3

Celebrity		No. of Votes	Original Run		No. of days as Camp Leader	Outed by
Celebrity		No. of Votes	First day	Last day	No. of days as Camp Leader	Outed by
1	Shane Warne	Automatic Camp Leader on entry	Day 2	Day 15	14 Days	Paul Harragon
2	Paul "Chief" Harrogan	4 / 10 (Plurality)	Day 15	Day 45	30 Days	—N/a

^ - These numbers indicate number of Camp Leaders not Weeks

== Ratings ==
I'm a Celebrity...Get Met Out of Here! season 2 overnight ratings, with metropolitan viewership and nightly position
Week	Episode		Original airdate	Timeslot (approx.)	Viewers (millions)^{[a]}	Nightly rank^{[a]}	Source
1	1	"Opening Night"	31 January 2016	Sunday 6:30 pm	1.324	#3	
1	1	"Welcome to the Jungle"	31 January 2016	Sunday 6:30 pm	1.081	#5	
1	2	"Episode 2"	1 February 2016	Monday 7:30 pm	0.927	#7	
1	3	"Episode 3"	2 February 2016	Tuesday 7:30 pm	0.828	#8	
1	4	"Episode 4"	3 February 2016	Wednesday 7:30 pm	0.710	#11	
1	5	"Episode 5"	4 February 2016	Thursday 7:30 pm	0.890	#5	
2	6	"Episode 6"	7 February 2016	Sunday 6:30 pm	0.600	#11	
2	6	"Eviction"	7 February 2016	Sunday 6:30 pm	0.626	#9	
2	7	"Episode 7"	8 February 2016	Monday 7:30 pm	0.735	#11	
2	8	"Episode 8"	9 February 2016	Tuesday 7:30 pm	0.766	#13	
2	9	"Episode 9"	10 February 2016	Wednesday 7:30 pm	0.691	#12	
2	10	"Episode 10"	11 February 2016	Thursday 7:30 pm	0.791	#7	
3	11	"Episode 11"	14 February 2016	Sunday 6:30 pm	0.634	#11	
3	11	"Eviction"	14 February 2016	Sunday 6:30 pm	0.706	#8	
3	12	"Episode 12"	15 February 2016	Monday 7:30 pm	0.682	#13	
3	13	"Episode 13"	16 February 2016	Tuesday 7:30 pm	0.648	#13	
3	14	"Episode 14"	17 February 2016	Wednesday 7:30 pm	0.688	#11	
3	15	"Episode 15"	18 February 2016	Thursday 7:30 pm	0.721	#8	
4	16	"Episode 16"	21 February 2016	Sunday 6:30 pm	0.556	#11	
4	16	"Eviction"	21 February 2016	Sunday 6:30 pm	0.645	#8	
4	17	"Episode 17"	22 February 2016	Monday 7:30 pm	0.685	#13	
4	18	"Episode 18"	23 February 2016	Tuesday 7:30 pm	0.753	#13	
4	19	"Episode 19"	24 February 2016	Wednesday 7:30 pm	0.694	#12	
4	20	"Episode 20"	25 February 2016	Thursday 7:30 pm	0.719	#8	
5	21	"Episode 21"	28 February 2016	Sunday 6:30 pm	0.584	#12	
5	21	"Eviction"	28 February 2016	Sunday 6:30 pm	0.713	#9	
5	22	"Episode 22"	29 February 2016	Monday 7:30 pm	0.713	#12	
5	23	"Episode 23"	1 March 2016	Tuesday 7:30 pm	0.688	#12	
5	24	"Episode 24"	2 March 2016	Wednesday 7:30 pm	0.637	#12	
5	25	"Episode 25"	3 March 2016	Thursday 7:30 pm	0.676	#8	
6	26	"Episode 26"	6 March 2016	Sunday 6:30 pm	0.559	#13	
6	26	"Eviction"	6 March 2016	Sunday 6:30 pm	0.618	#8	
6	27	"Episode 27"	7 March 2016	Monday 7:30 pm	0.691	#14	
6	27	"Eviction"	7 March 2016	Monday 7:30 pm	0.670	#15	
6	28	"Episode 28"	8 March 2016	Tuesday 7:30 pm	0.712	#13	
6	28	"Eviction"	8 March 2016	Tuesday 7:30 pm	0.742	#12	
6	29	"Episode 29"	9 March 2016	Wednesday 7:30 pm	0.797	#8	
6	29	"Eviction"	9 March 2016	Wednesday 7:30 pm	0.775	#10	
6	30	"Episode 30"	10 March 2016	Thursday 7:30 pm	0.702	#8	
6	30	"Eviction"	10 March 2016	Thursday 7:30 pm	0.780	#5	
7	31	"Finale"	13 March 2016	Sunday 6:30 pm	0.719	#8	
7	31	"Winner Announced"	13 March 2016	Sunday 6:30 pm	0.858	#6	

- ^{a} Ratings data is from OzTAM and represents the live and same day average viewership from the 5 largest Australian metropolitan centres (Sydney, Melbourne, Brisbane, Perth and Adelaide).

== See also ==
- I'm a Celebrity...Get Me Out of Here! (Australian TV series) season 1
