= I'm a Celebrity...Get Me Out of Here! (Australian TV series) season 1 =

I'm a Celebrity...Get Me Out of Here!
- Season 1
- Hosted by: Chris Brown; Julia Morris
- No. of days: 45
- No. of contestants: 14
- Winner: Freddie Flintoff
- Runner-up: Barry Hall
- Location: Kruger National Park, South Africa
- Companion show: The Fallout Zone
- No. of episodes: 31

Release
- Original network: Network Ten
- Original release: 1 February – 15 March 2015

Series chronology
- Next → Season 2

The first season of I'm a Celebrity...Get Me Out of Here premiered on Network Ten on 1 February 2015. The season was hosted by Julia Morris and Chris Brown. Andrew 'Freddie' Flintoff won the season, getting crowned King of the Jungle on 15 March 2015.

== Celebrities ==
Celebrity	Known for	Status	Source
Freddie Flintoff	Former England cricketer	Winner on 15 March 2015	
Barry Hall	Former AFL player	Runner-up on 15 March 2015	
Chrissie Swan	Television & radio broadcaster	Third Place on 15 March 2015	
Maureen McCormick	The Brady Bunch actress	Eliminated 11th on 12 March 2015	
Joel Creasey	Comedian	Eliminated 10th on 11 March 2015	
Anna Heinrich	The Bachelor Australia contestant	Eliminated 9th on 11 March 2015	
Julie Goodwin	Chef & cookbook author	Eliminated 8th on 10 March 2015	
Merv Hughes	Former test match cricketer	Eliminated 7th on 9 March 2015	
Tyson Mayr	Model	Eliminated 6th on 8 March 2015	
Andrew Daddo	Television & radio presenter	Eliminated 5th on 1 March 2015	
Lauren Brant	Hi-5 singer	Eliminated 4th on 22 February 2015	
Laura Dundovic	Miss Universe Australia 2008	Eliminated 3rd on 15 February 2015	
Tim Robards	The Bachelor Australia star	Eliminated 2nd on 15 February 2015	
Leisel Jones	Olympic swimmer	Eliminated 1st on 8 February 2015	

== Results and elimination ==
Indicates that the celebrity received the most votes from the public
Indicates that the celebrity received the fewest votes and was eliminated immediately (no bottom two)
Indicates that the celebrity was named as being in the bottom 2, or bottom 3

Elimination results per celebrity
Celebrity	Week 1	Week 2	Week 3	Week 4	Week 5	Week 6				Finale	Number of trials
Celebrity	Week 1	Week 2	Week 3	Week 4	Week 5	Day 39	Day 40	Day 41	Day 42	Finale	Number of trials
Freddie	Not in Camp		Safe	Safe	Safe	Safe	Safe	Safe	Safe	Winner (Day 45)	7
Barry	Safe	Safe	Safe	Safe	Safe	Safe	Bottom two	Safe	Bottom two	Runner-up (Day 45)	11
Chrissie	Safe	Safe	Safe	Safe	Safe	Safe	Safe	Safe	Safe	Third Place (Day 45)	7
Maureen	Safe	Safe	Safe	Safe	Safe	Safe	Safe	Bottom three	4th	Eliminated (Day 42)	5
Joel	Safe	Safe	Safe	Safe	Safe	Bottom three	Safe	5th	Eliminated (Day 41)		8
Anna	Not in Camp	Safe	Safe	Safe	Safe	Safe	Safe	6th	Eliminated (Day 41)		6
Julie	Not in Camp		Bottom two	Bottom two	Bottom two	Bottom three	7th	Eliminated (Day 40)			2
Merv	Safe	Safe	Safe	Safe	Safe	8th	Eliminated (Day 39)				4
Tyson	Safe	Safe	Safe	Safe	9th	Eliminated (Day 38)					4
Andrew	Safe	Safe	Safe	10th	Eliminated (Day 31)						3
Lauren	Safe	Bottom three	11th	Eliminated (Day 24)							3
Laura	Bottom two	12th	Eliminated (Day 17)								4
Tim	Not in Camp	13th	Eliminated (Day 17)								1
Leisel	14th	Eliminated (Day 10)									0
Bottom two/three	Laura, Leisel	Laura, Lauren, Tim	Julie, Lauren	Andrew, Julie	Julie, Tyson	Joel, Julie, Merv	Barry, Julie	Anna, Joel, Maureen	Barry, Maureen	None	
Eliminated	Leisel; Fewest votes to save	Tim; Fewest votes to save	Lauren; Fewest votes to save	Andrew; Fewest votes to save	Tyson; Fewest votes to save	Merv; Fewest votes to save	Julie; Fewest votes to save	Anna; Fewest votes to save	Maureen; Fewest votes to save	Chrissie; Fewest votes to win (out of 3)	
Eliminated	Leisel; Fewest votes to save	Tim; Fewest votes to save	Lauren; Fewest votes to save	Andrew; Fewest votes to save	Tyson; Fewest votes to save	Merv; Fewest votes to save	Julie; Fewest votes to save	Anna; Fewest votes to save	Maureen; Fewest votes to save	Barry; Fewest votes to win (out of 3)	
Eliminated	Leisel; Fewest votes to save	Laura; Fewest votes to save	Lauren; Fewest votes to save	Andrew; Fewest votes to save	Tyson; Fewest votes to save	Merv; Fewest votes to save	Julie; Fewest votes to save	Joel; Fewest votes to save	Maureen; Fewest votes to save	Barry; Fewest votes to win (out of 3)	
Eliminated	Leisel; Fewest votes to save	Laura; Fewest votes to save	Lauren; Fewest votes to save	Andrew; Fewest votes to save	Tyson; Fewest votes to save	Merv; Fewest votes to save	Julie; Fewest votes to save	Joel; Fewest votes to save	Maureen; Fewest votes to save	Freddie; Most votes to win	

=== Intruder trials ===
Before the new contestants ('intruders') enter camp and meet the other celebrities, they have to undergo trials.

1. Anna and Tim took part in the "Bite Club" tucker trial as their entry to the jungle.
2. Julie had to rescue Freddie by releasing him from a 'net' trap. Later, Freddie and Julie spent a night at the "Hard Rocks Hotel", so they could deliver luxury items to the celebrities already in camp.

=== Notes ===
- The number of tucker trials, given next to each of the celebrities' names, does not include either "Celebrity Stampede", or "Walk the Line", or "Africarnage", as all remaining celebrities competed in these three tucker trials.

== Tucker trials ==
The contestants take part in daily trials to earn food. These trials aim to test both physical and mental abilities. The winner is usually determined by the number of stars collected during the trial, with each star representing a meal earned by the winning contestant for their camp mates.

The public voted for who they wanted to face the trial
The contestants decided who did which trial
The trial was compulsory and neither the public nor celebrities decided who took part
The contestants were chosen by the evicted celebrities

Trial number	Air date	Name of trial	Celebrity participation	Number of stars	Notes	Source
1	1 February	Star Struck	Barry; Chrissie; Joel	6/10 stars	None	
2	2 February	Circle of Strife	Joel	10/10 stars	None	
3	3 February	Yuck of the Draw	Maureen; Merv	8/10 stars	None	
4	4 February	In the Pits	Laura; Maureen	4/10 stars	1	
5	5 February	Danger Downunder	Barry	10/10 stars	None	
6	8 February	Screech for the Stars	Laura	2/10 stars	2	
7	9 February	Bite Club	Anna; Tim	11/11 stars	3	
8	10 February	Blood, Sweat and Cheers	Laura; Lauren	11/11 stars	4	
9	11 February	Rock Star	Laura	6/11 stars	5	
10	12 February	Temple of Doom	Tyson	5/11 stars	6	
11	15 February	Fright for Sore Eyes	Andrew; Anna	7/11 stars	7	
12	16 February	Mirror, Mirror on the Wall	Joel; Barry	2/11 stars	8	
13	17 February	Twisted Takeaway	Lauren; Anna	11/11 stars	9	
14	18 February	Bad Hair Day	Merv	11/11 stars	None	
15	19 February	High Rollers	Tyson; Freddie	3/11 stars	10	
16	22 February	Celebrity Stampede	Anna; Andrew; Barry; Chrissie; Freddie; Joel; Julie; Lauren; Maureen; Merv; Tyson	11/11 stars	11	
17	23 February	Stairway to Stardom	Andrew	10/10 stars	12	
18	24 February	Market Munchies	Chrissie; Merv	6/10 stars	None	
19	25 February	Safari Spa	Freddie	9/10 stars	None	
20	26 February	Dunk Your Lucky Stars	Joel; Julie	6/10 stars	None	
21	1 March	Flight or Fright	Freddie; Barry	10/10 stars	13	
22	2 March	Bush Bashing	Tyson; Anna	8/9 stars	14	
23	3 March	Sugar and Strife	Joel; Barry	9/9 stars	None	
24	4 March	Jungle Jive	Barry	9/9 stars	None	
25	5 March	Celebrity Slingshot	Barry; Maureen	5/9 stars	None	
26	8 March	Flash Flood	Chrissie	1/9 stars	15	
27	9 March	Dreadfall	Chrissie; Joel	0/8 stars	16	
28	10 March	Disgustation	Freddie	6/7 stars	17	
29	11 March	Walk the Line	Anna; Barry; Chrissie; Freddie; Joel; Maureen	6/6 stars	18	
30	12 March	Lord of the Pies	Barry	4/4 stars	19	
31	15 March	Africarnage	Barry; Chrissie; Freddie	3/3 stars	None	

=== Notes ===
- ^1 Laura chose not to participate in one of the three tanks, forfeiting three of the stars on offer. The celebrities won three stars, but were gifted a fourth (which was collected just out of the allotted time) by host Chris Brown.
- ^2 This trial was for three days worth of meals for camp.
- ^3 This trial was completed by Tim and Anna as part of their entry to camp.
- ^4 As new arrivals, Anna and Tim were exempt from this trial.
- ^5 As part of this trial, Laura had to choose two celebrities to take with her to assist her in the trial. She chose to take Andrew and Barry.
- ^6 The five meals were eaten by the women - while the men were in a secret camp location drinking beer and eating buckets of KFC (after winning a secret challenge).
- ^7 This trial was for three days worth of food for camp. Following a secret challenge, for St Valentine's Day, all the celebrities were given chocolate.
- ^8 Joel and Barry were chosen for the tucker trial by evicted celebrities Tim and Laura.
- ^9 Lauren and Anna also won a bonus star for the group, which gave the group special beverages (a choice of beer or wine). Following the discovery of a contraband block of chocolate in camp, celebrities were told these drinks would be forfeited unless the chocolate was handed in. After discussion, the celebrities chose to hand in the chocolate and keep the drinks.
- ^10 Merv and Chrissie were both exempt from this trial on medical grounds.
- ^11 This trial was a 'team trial' and everyone competed, with Andrew and Chrissie as the team captains (as per the results of Australia's vote). This trial was also a time trial, which Andrew's team won with a time of 21.08 seconds. Chrissie's team's time was close, with a time of 22.25 seconds. Both teams experienced delays. Andrew's team-mates were: Julie, Anna, Barry, Freddie and Merv. Chrissie's team-mates were: Joel, Maureen, Lauren and Tyson. The teams had to collect the stars and out-run Tembo, the six-tonne elephant leader, and the other tracking elephants. Both teams were successful in doing this. Tembo the elephant leader brought the winning cup to Andrew as the winning captain.
- ^12 Andrew was chosen for the tucker trial by evicted celebrity Lauren.
- ^13 This trial was for three days worth of meals for camp. Based on the vote count, Freddie competed for the stars on the inside of the net and Barry competed for the stars on the outside of the net.
- ^14 Tyson and Anna were chosen for the tucker trial by evicted celebrity Andrew.
- ^15 The trial "Dreadfall" was originally planned for this episode, but was cancelled due to technical difficulties. Chrissie and Tyson had been selected to participate in this trial, but as the replacement trial "Flash Flood" only required one celebrity, Chrissie was chosen based on the vote count.
- ^16 Chrissie and Joel were chosen for the tucker trial by evicted celebrity Tyson.
- ^17 Freddie was chosen for the tucker trial by evicted celebrity Merv.
- ^18 The celebrities also won a bonus drink in this trial for collecting all six stars within 45 minutes.
- ^19 Barry was chosen for the tucker trial by evicted celebrities Anna and Joel.

== Celebrity chest challenges ==
Two or more celebrities are chosen to take part in the "Celebrity Chest" challenge to win luxuries for camp. Each challenge involves completing a task to win a chest to take back to camp. However, to win the luxury item in the chest, the campmates must correctly answer a question. If they fail to answer correctly, the luxury item is forfeited and a joke prize is won. The luxury item is "donated" by a celebrity from the outside.

The celebrities got the question correct
The celebrities got the question wrong

Episode	Air date	Chest challenge	Celebrity participation	Celebrity prize donor	Prize	Source
2	2 February	Lumberjack Saw	Andrew; Laura	Kyle Sandilands	Electric bug zapper	
4	4 February	Bowled Over	Lauren; Tyson	Grant Denyer	Marshmallows; They instead got a swimming cap	
5	5 February	Celebrity Slam	Leisel; Merv	Jane Hall	Biltong, with tofu as a vegetarian alternative.	
6	8 February	Jessica the Hippo	Chrissie; Maureen	Sandra Sully	A bar of chocolate with 10 squares	
8	10 February	Step Up	Andrew; Merv	Jeff Fenech	Salt and pepper	
9	11 February	Cheat the Cheetah	Joel; Tyson	Jackie O	Champagne and strawberries They instead got wax strips	
11	15 February	Vulture's Cage	Maureen; Tim	Warwick Capper	Popcorn with butter & salt	
13	17 February	Catfish Combination	Freddie; Merv	Ricky Ponting	Ingredients to make scones Joke prize unknown	
14	18 February	No Pressure	Barry; Julie; Chrissie	Ita Buttrose	Lollies and nuts They instead got 'celebrity faces' on sticks	
15	19 February	Milk It	Anna; Tyson	Matt Preston	Goat cheese and crackers	
17	23 February	Spout It Out	Chrissie; Merv	Alan Fletcher	Milk and Milo	
18	24 February	Crate Expectations	Joel; Freddie	Carrie Bickmore	Chocolate biscuits They instead got an empty jug	
19	25 February	Pinata Pummel	Anna; Barry	Jamie Durie	Lollies	
22	2 March	Furry Animals	Merv; Maureen	Dr Katrina Warren	Biscuits	
25	5 March	Bucket List	Julie; Freddie	Unknown	Cherry Ripe; They instead got luxury items for Julie (a family photo album) and Freddie (a frisbee)	
29	11 March	Poles Apart	Julie; Barry	Michelle Bridges	Fruit and nuts	
30	12 March	Spiders Web	Maureen; Freddie	Catriona Rowntree	Bread, butter and vegemite	

== Secret challenges ==
This is a challenge where some celebrities have to take part without alerting the other celebrities - if they are successful in their 'missions', they are rewarded.

=== The men's secret challenge ===
All of the men had to sneak into the Tok Tokkie (the confessional room) without the women noticing. The reward was a 'night out' away from the women, eating Kentucky Fried Chicken and drinking beer

=== Maureen's sneaky snacks ===
During week 4, Maureen was given a series of tasks from the Tok Tokkie. This task was for her to secretly share some treats with select campmates without the others knowing.

1. Coffee - Shared with Joel
2. Koeksisters - Shared with Joel and Chrissie
3. Garlic bread - Shared with Joel, Chrissie and Julie

The sneaky snacks trials were all undetected by the other campmates. The reward, for all three sneaky snacks being successful, included coffee, milk, sugar, koeksisters and garlic bread for all the campmates.

=== Freddie's beg, borrow, steal ===
Freddie's Secret Challenge, given to him at the Tok Tokkie, was to use other celebrities luxury items. His 3 tasks were:

1. Obtain Joel's picture of Harry Styles
2. Use Chrissie's mirror and put it into his bag
3. Sit on Barry's sheepskin bed without him noticing (Barry had recently barred him from doing so)

Freddie completed these tasks in the following ways:

1. The picture was borrowed by stating to Joel he wanted it to overlay his son's picture on the frame because he was turning 9 today.
2. Chrissie's mirror was stolen by placing a jar of salt in front of the flip mirror, distracting her from noticing he was taking the mirror
3. The sheepskin was sat on while Barry was relatively close, and the other campmates warned him against it, but he went undetected.

The reward was 10 minutes of "grooming time" for all campmates, i.e. time with various grooming implements like shavers. Freddie unexpectedly shaved his head down the middle, leaving only tufts of lighter shade hair on the side.

== Mystery box ==
Every day during week 5, a mystery box was delivered to the campsite. Each time the box was delivered, something different was found inside.

1. The box contained Grant Denyer, who asked the celebrities questions based on events that occurred in the outside world - if the answers the celebrities gave were correct, they ate as much of their favourite food as they could in a minute. If the answers were wrong, Grant Denyer ate their favourite food instead - in front of them.
2. The box contained nine small containers of popcorn and a 'ticket' to see a 'horror' movie. The movie turned out to be clips of the celebrities themselves, with footage taken from various 'tucker trials'.
3. In the box was a 2-way-radio and a bike. The celebrities had to use the bike to power the radio. Once the radio was powered enough, the celebrities could communicate to the outside world (through the Fitzy and Wippa radio show).
4. In the box was a note stating that letters from home were up for grabs and that they would have to answer a question to win the letter. However each celebrity was playing for someone else's letter.

== Craft club ==
One of the notable activities to occur throughout the series was the Craft Club. Andrew began a craft club, making various wooden utensils, including a wooden spoon and chopsticks for his campmates, as well as making knitting needles for Julie. Julie took threads from a cloth bag, in which the luxury goods were brought into camp, and knitted various items including a headband for Freddie and a scarf for Joel, as well as a night mask for Chrissie's eyes.

== Ratings ==
I'm a Celebrity...Get Met Out of Here! (season 1) overnight ratings, with metropolitan viewership and nightly position
Week	Episode		Original airdate	Timeslot (approx.)	Viewers (millions)^{[a]}	Nightly rank^{[a]}	Source
1	1	"Opening Night"	1 February 2015	Sunday 6:30 pm	1.199	#4	
1	1	"Welcome to the Jungle"	1 February 2015	Sunday 6:30 pm	1.136	#5	
1	2	"Episode 2"	2 February 2015	Monday 7:30 pm	0.755	#14	
1	3	"Episode 3"	3 February 2015	Tuesday 7:30 pm	0.685	#13	
1	4	"Episode 4"	4 February 2015	Wednesday 7:30 pm	0.588	#14	
1	5	"Episode 5"	5 February 2015	Thursday 7:30 pm	0.698	#12	
2	6	"Episode 6"	8 February 2015	Sunday 6:30 pm	0.616	#12	
2	6	"Eviction"	8 February 2015	Sunday 6:30 pm	0.744	#8	
2	7	"Intruders Enter"	9 February 2015	Monday 7:30 pm	0.614	#20	
2	7	"Episode 7"	9 February 2015	Monday 7:30 pm	0.651	#15	
2	8	"Episode 8"	10 February 2015	Tuesday 7:30 pm	0.581	#17	
2	9	"Episode 9"	11 February 2015	Wednesday 7:30 pm	0.600	#15	
2	10	"Episode 10"	12 February 2015	Thursday 7:30 pm	0.620	#10	
3	11	"Episode 11"	15 February 2015	Sunday 6:30 pm	0.627	#13	
3	11	"Eviction"	15 February 2015	Sunday 6:30 pm	0.736	#9	
3	12	"Episode 12"	16 February 2015	Monday 7:30 pm	0.601	#18	
3	13	"Episode 13"	17 February 2015	Tuesday 7:30 pm	0.652	#15	
3	14	"Episode 14"	18 February 2015	Wednesday 7:30 pm	0.608	#13	
3	15	"Episode 15"	19 February 2015	Thursday 7:30 pm	0.608	#11	
4	16	"Episode 16"	22 February 2015	Sunday 6:30 pm	0.660	#13	
4	16	"Eviction"	22 February 2015	Sunday 6:30 pm	0.756	#9	
4	17	"Episode 17"	23 February 2015	Monday 7:30 pm	0.617	#16	
4	18	"Episode 18"	24 February 2015	Tuesday 7:30 pm	0.663	#14	
4	19	"Episode 19"	25 February 2015	Wednesday 7:30 pm	0.622	#14	
4	20	"Episode 20"	26 February 2015	Thursday 7:30 pm	0.562	#11	
5	21	"Episode 21"	1 March 2015	Sunday 6:30 pm	0.660	#12	
5	21	"Eviction"	1 March 2015	Sunday 6:30 pm	0.783	#7	
5	22	"Episode 22"	2 March 2015	Monday 7:30 pm	0.748	#12	
5	23	"Episode 23"	3 March 2015	Tuesday 7:30 pm	0.668	#13	
5	24	"Episode 24"	4 March 2015	Wednesday 7:30 pm	0.535	#15	
5	25	"Episode 25"	5 March 2015	Thursday 7:30 pm	0.614	#10	
6	26	"Episode 26"	8 March 2015	Sunday 6:30 pm	0.617	#11	
6	26	"Eviction"	8 March 2015	Sunday 6:30 pm	0.727	#8	
6	27	"Episode 27"	9 March 2015	Monday 7:30 pm	0.682	#17	
6	27	"Eviction"	9 March 2015	Monday 7:30 pm	0.688	#16	
6	28	"Episode 28"	10 March 2015	Tuesday 7:30 pm	0.682	#12	
6	28	"Eviction"	10 March 2015	Tuesday 7:30 pm	0.791	#10	
6	29	"Episode 29"	11 March 2015	Wednesday 7:30 pm	0.620	#14	
6	29	"Eviction"	11 March 2015	Wednesday 7:30 pm	0.680	#10	
6	30	"Episode 30"	12 March 2015	Thursday 7:30 pm	0.679	#12	
6	30	"Eviction"	12 March 2015	Thursday 7:30 pm	0.709	#10	
7	31	"Finale"	15 March 2015	Sunday 6:30 pm	0.999	#8	
7	31	"Winner Announced"	15 March 2015	Sunday 6:30 pm	1.144	#3	

- ^{a} Ratings data is from OzTAM and represents the live and same day average viewership from the 5 largest Australian metropolitan centres (Sydney, Melbourne, Brisbane, Perth and Adelaide).
