= Laurina Fleure =

Australian model

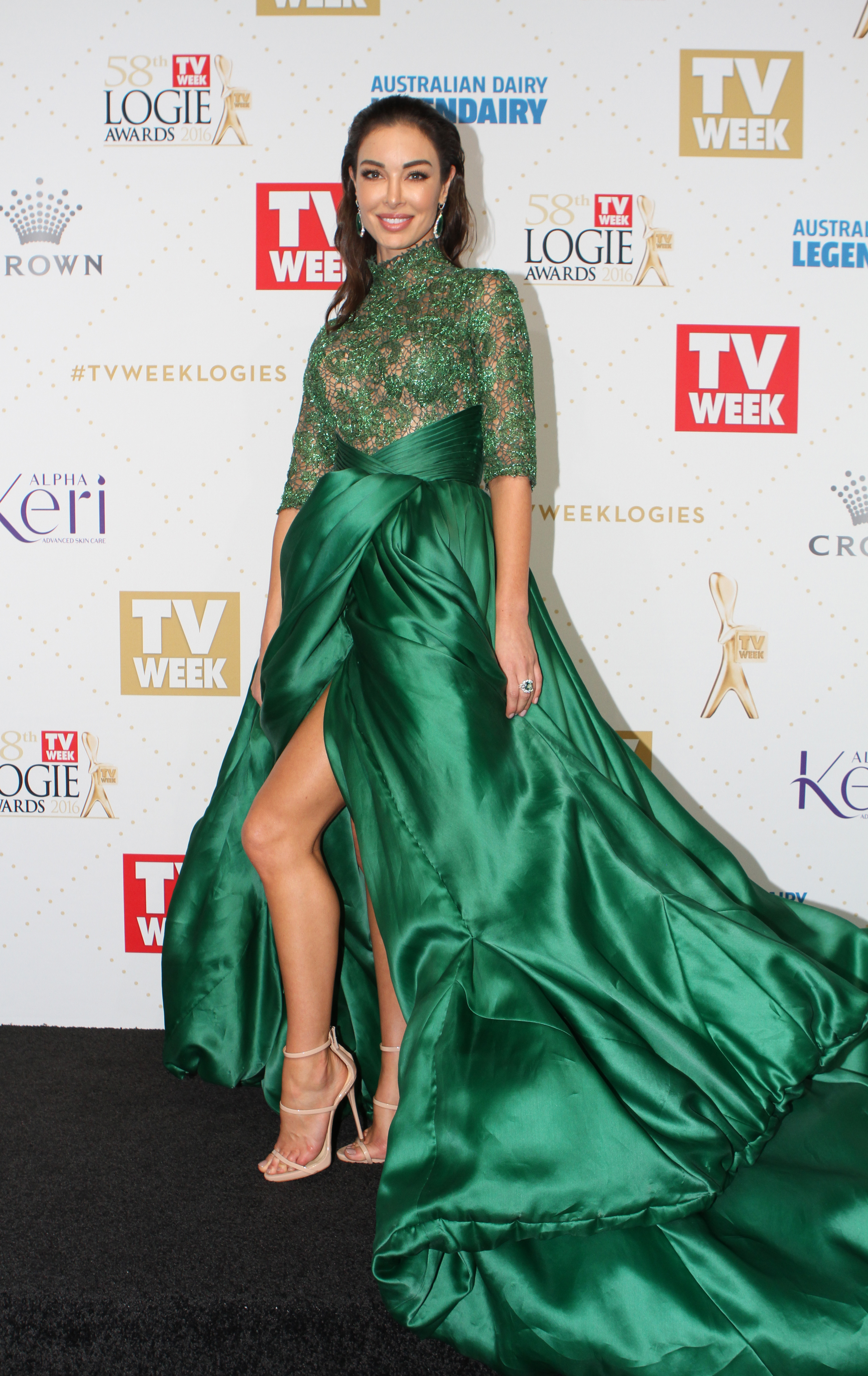
- Fleure at the 2016 Logie Awards
- Born: 19 June 1981 (age 45); Melbourne, Victoria, Australia
- Modeling information
- Height: 172 cm (5 ft 8 in)
- Hair color: Brown
- Eye color: Green
- Agency: Associated Model And Talent Agencies

Laurina Fleure (born 19 June 1981) is an Australian model and television personality.

== Career ==
Fleure competed in the second season of The Bachelor Australia in 2014, where she finished sixth. She won a "cult following" from her appearance on The Bachelor Australia.

Fleure competed in the second season of I'm a Celebrity...Get Me Out of Here! in 2016, where she finished third.

Fleure's modelling work has included fronting Brands Exclusive's "Celebrity Shopping, Reality Prices" campaign in 2016.

Fleure also appeared in the first season of Bachelor in Paradise Australia in 2018, where she entered in episode 2. She decided to quit in episode 7.

== Personal life ==
Fleure dated Lewis Romano in 2015 and 2016 before splitting in October 2016.
