= Paul Harragon =

Australia international rugby league footballer

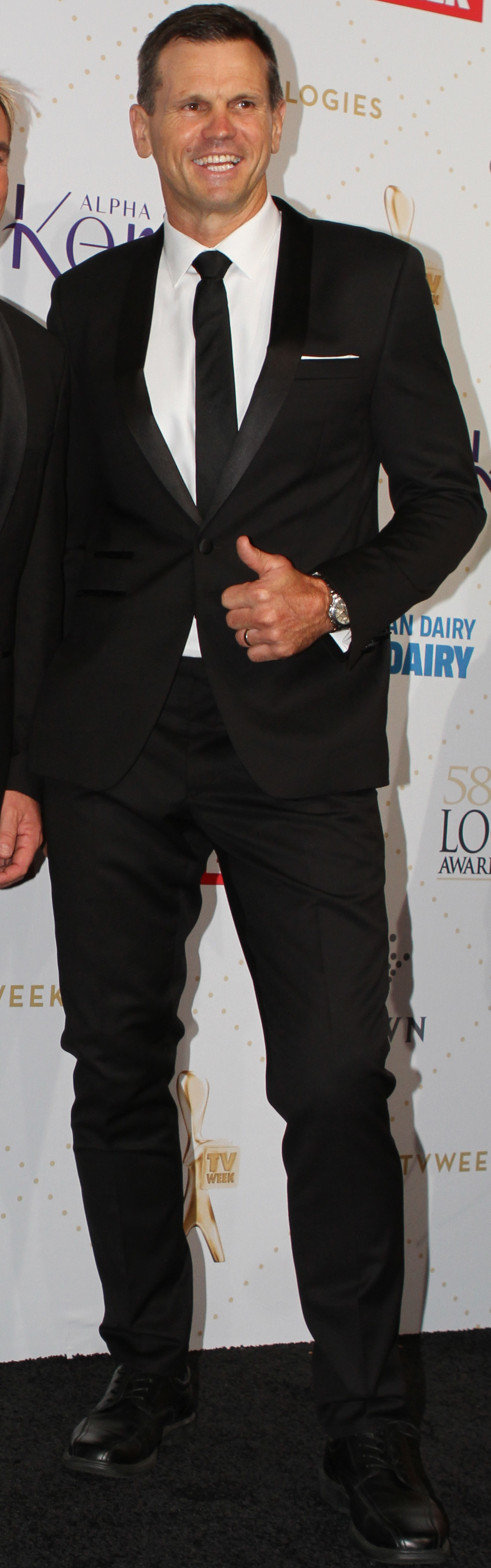
- Harragon in 2016

Personal information
- Full name: Paul William Harragon
- Born: 12 October 1968 (age 58) Kurri Kurri, New South Wales

Playing information
- Height: 193 cm (6 ft 4 in)
- Weight: 111 kg (17 st 7 lb)
- Position: Prop, Second-row
Club
Years	Team	Pld	T	G	FG	P
1988–99	Newcastle Knights	169	19	0	0	76
Representative
Years	Team	Pld	T	G	FG	P
1992–97	Country NSW	6	2	0	0	8
1992–98	New South Wales	20	2	0	0	8
1992–98	Australia	20	3	0	0	12

Paul William Harragon OAM (born 12 October 1968), nicknamed Chief or Chief Harragon, is an Australian rugby league football identity. A former Australian international and New South Wales State of Origin representative forward, he played rugby for the Newcastle Knights whom he captained to the 1997 ARL premiership. Harragon was a regular presenter of The Footy Show and as of 2013 is the Chairman of the Newcastle Knights Advisory Board.

== Background ==
Harragon was born and raised in Kurri Kurri, New South Wales, Australia.

== Playing career ==
Harragon played for Lakes United in the Newcastle competition. He joined the Newcastle Knights in 1988 and made his first grade debut in 1989 against the Balmain Tigers.

He represented and captained Country, New South Wales and Australia. He was named man-of-the-match in the second game of the 1994 State of Origin series. At the end of the 1994 NSWRL season, he went on the 1994 Kangaroo tour.

Harragon captained the Knights to the 1997 ARL premiership title in a grand final against Manly-Warringah Sea Eagles, despite suffering from serious headaches and seizures throughout most of the season.

Harragon excelled at the State of Origin level, making 20 consecutive appearances for New South Wales between Game I 1992 and Game II 1998. He holds the record for the second most consecutive Origin games by a New South Welshman (Danny Buderus played 21 consecutive State of Origin games between game I 2002 and game III 2008), and most appearances by a NSW forward.

Between 1992 & 1998, Harragon was a frequent choice to play for the Kangaroos. During the 1992 Great Britain Lions tour of Australia and New Zealand, he helped Australia retain The Ashes. All up, he scored three tries while representing his country. He missed the 1995 World Cup final due to injury, with Gary Larson being flown in to replace him. That year it was reported that Harragon would receive $1.2 million to secure his loyalty to the Australian Rugby League in addition to $700,000 per season for the next three seasons.

In 1996, he captained the team in a World Cup Test against South Africa, and in 1997 he played in a match against the "Rest of the World".

In 1999, Harragon participated in the first rugby league game to be played at Stadium Australia. Later that year, after playing 169 first grade games in a career lasting ten years, Harragon retired due to an ongoing knee injury mid-season.

== Post-playing career ==
Harragon has since become a media personality, working for local Newcastle station NBN Television, before joining Channel 9 as a member of The Footy Show panel (on which his "That's Gold" segment became immensely popular), and as a rugby league commentator. Following format changes to the programme before the 2009 season, Harragon decided to leave the production.

Harragon was also a director of and is a life member of the Newcastle Knights, is spokesman for NIB Health Funds and Subway, and is a brand ambassador for Whitelaw McDonald Lawyers.

In 2016, Harragon became a contestant on Network Ten's second series of I'm a Celebrity...Get Me Out of Here! in which he placed second, earning $50,000 his charity after the winner, Brendon Fevola, decided to split the grand prize with Harragon's chosen charity, the Mark Hughes Foundation.

=== Discography ===
List of singles, with selected chart positions
Title	Year	Peak chart positions
Title	Year	AUS
"That's Gold"	2007	8

Preceded by Brad Fittler	Australian national rugby league captain 1995	Succeeded by Geoff Toovey
