= Julia Morris =

Australian comedian

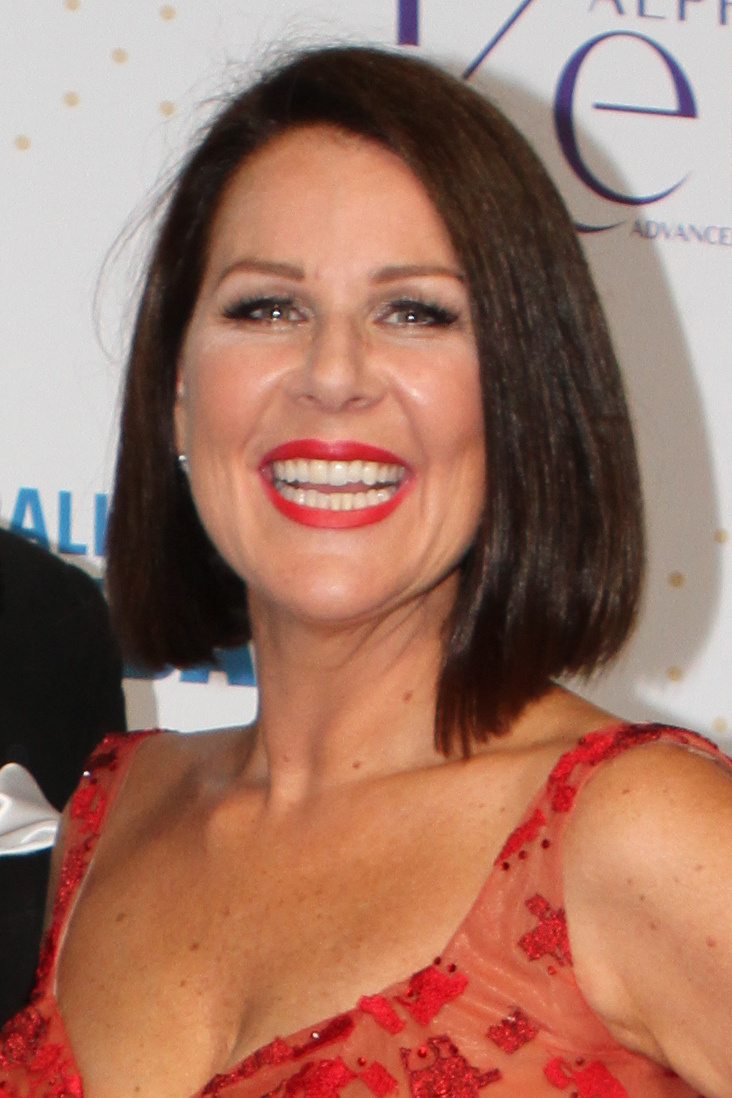
- Morris at the 2016 Logie Awards
- Born: Sydney, New South Wales, Australia
- Notable work: I'm a Celebrity...Get Me Out of Here!; Chris & Julia's Sunday Night Takeaway
- Spouse(s): Dan Thomas (m, 2005, div, 2022)
- Children: 2

Comedy career
- Years active: 1985–present
- Medium: Stand-up, television

Julia Morris is an Australian comedian, television presenter, and actress. She has worked extensively in Australian television and radio, touring the country with her solo comedy shows. She relocated to the United Kingdom in 2000, appearing on British television, then returned to Australia in 2007. She co-hosted Network 10's I'm a Celebrity...Get Me Out of Here! Australia from 2015 to 2026 with Chris Brown between 2015 to 2023 and Robert Irwin from 2024 to 2026.

== Early life and education ==
Julia Morris was educated at St Joseph's Catholic College in East Gosford and then Santa Sabina College in Strathfield.

She attended the Ensemble Theatre School in Sydney, and later went to acting school for two years in Los Angeles.

== Career ==
=== Television ===
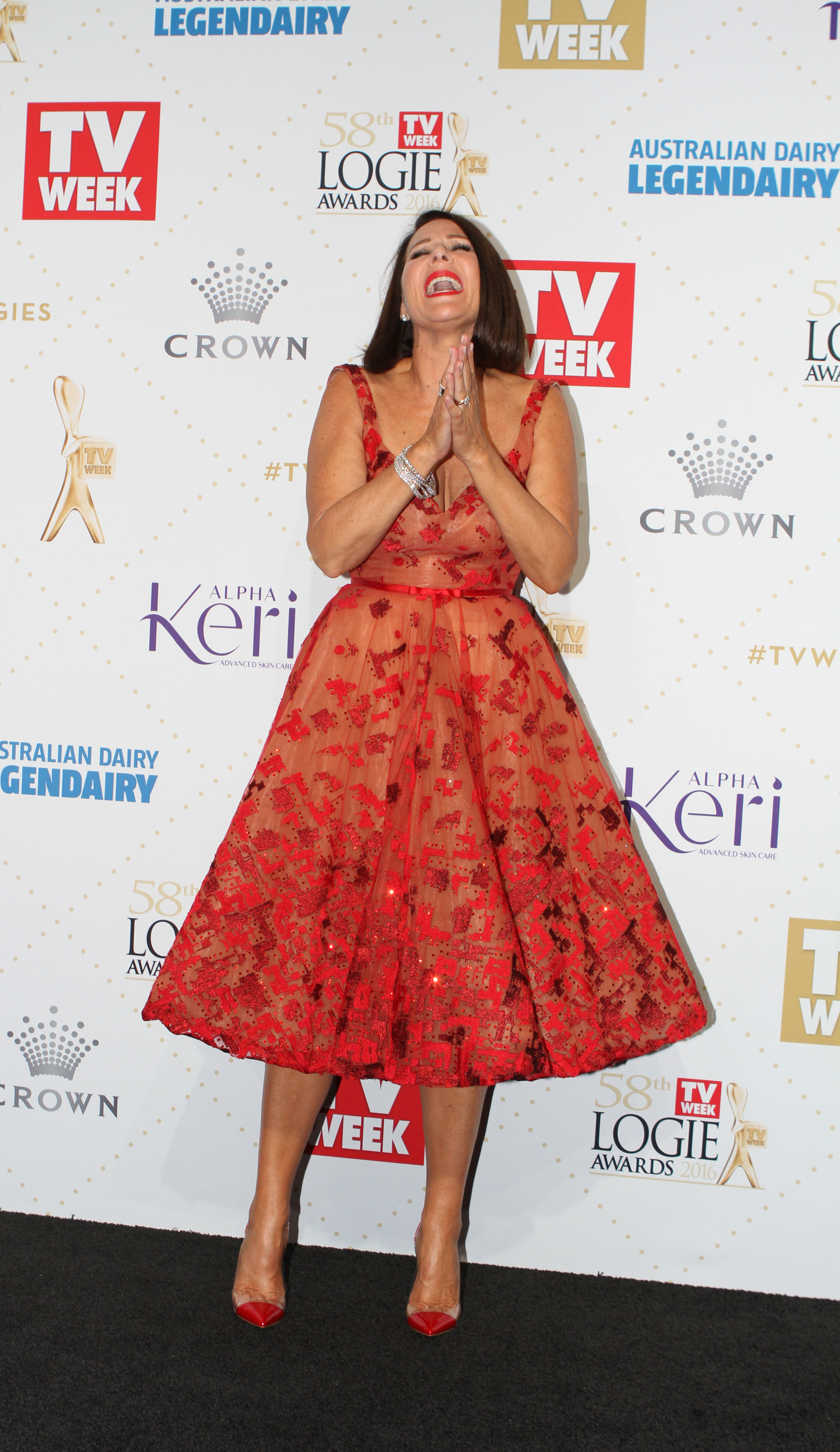
Morris at the 2016 Logie Awards

Morris's first television appearance was in 1985, aged 17, as a contestant on the talent show New Faces. She performed "Holding Out for a Hero", a Jim Steinman song made famous by Bonnie Tyler, and tied for first place.

After several years in variety and stand-up, Morris's big break came when she joined the ensemble cast of the hit Australian sketch comedy series Full Frontal in 1995. This led to hosting roles on Great Aussie Bloopers and "The Morris Report" on the live variety series In Melbourne Tonight, as well as regular appearances on The Midday Show, Good Morning Australia, Beauty and the Beast and Who Dares Wins as well as the action series Gladiators.

Morris relocated to the UK in 2000. As well as stand-up, she made appearances on the TV quiz QI, an episode of the sitcom Not Going Out playing a successful beautician, and in the sixth episode of season three of Kathy Griffin's My Life on the D-List, offering advice on the British audiences. Morris also had a stint presenting the BBC's Liquid News show in 2002.

She returned to Australia in 2007. Appearances on Australian TV include on Thank God You're Here, Good News Week, Spicks and Specks, Rove Live, The Singing Office, It Takes Two, Sleuth 101, Studio 10, The Project, The Living Room, Have You Been Paying Attention? and Hughesy, We Have a Problem. She won the third season of the reality singing series It Takes Two, in which she was partnered with opera singer David Hobson. Her winnings were donated to the Emily Tapp Foundation, a charity dedicated to melanoma awareness and prevention. She has also appeared in a series of commercials for All-Bran cereal, which also featured fellow actress and comedian Helen Dallimore.

Morris was the winning contestant on the 2011 series of The Celebrity Apprentice Australia, beating teammate Jason Coleman, model Jesinta Campbell and AFL footballer Shane Crawford.

In 2012, Morris has starred as Gemma Crabb in Nine Network's Melbourne-made drama series House Husbands. The show commenced a second season on 8 April 2013.

In April 2013, Morris was announced as the new host of television talent show Australia's Got Talent, which had switched from the Seven Network to the Nine Network.

On 1 February 2015, Morris began co-hosting the Australian version of I'm a Celebrity...Get Me Out of Here! with Chris Brown on Network 10.

In 2018, Morris hosted an updated version of dating show Blind Date on Network 10. On 24 February 2019, she began co-hosting Chris & Julia's Sunday Night Takeaway with Chris Brown on Network 10. At the 61st TV Week Logie Awards in 2019, Morris was nominated for the Gold Logie for the two aforementioned shows as well as I'm A Celebrity...Get Me Out Of Here!

She was again nominated for the Gold Logie in 2022 and then again in 2023. She has been nominated for a Gold Logie in 2025.

In 2020, Morris appeared as "Kitten" on the second season of The Masked Singer Australia and was eliminated in the semi-final, placing 5th overall.

In early 2023, Morris appeared as a celebrity contestant on the Australian adaption of the British comedy panel game show Taskmaster, titled Taskmaster Australia. She competed alongside fellow entertainers Jimmy Rees, Danielle Walker, Luke McGregor, and Nina Oyama.

In July 2023, Morris began narrating a new show on Network 10 called Dogs Behaving (Very) Badly Australia.

On 22 May 2026, Network 10 announced that I'm a Celebrity...Get Me Out of Here! would not be returning in 2027, after 12 series.

From September 2026, Morris played a school principal in a new ABC Television game show called Class Clowns, in which three pairs of comedians compete against each other answering questions on a variety of high school subjects. In the same month, Morris was in the cast for the Stan Original series Stuck Up & Stupid, based on Angourie Rice and Kate Rice’s novel of the same name. The novel is a witty reworking of Jane Austen's Pride and Prejudice, set in Australia. Filming was underway in Sydney.

=== Live performance ===
In 1999, Morris toured in the critically acclaimed Australian production of the Off-Broadway musical I Love You, You're Perfect, Now Change.

She has toured international comedy festivals, appearing at the Edinburgh Festival Fringe, South Africa's Vodacom Funny Festival, Montreal's Just For Laughs, and the Melbourne International Comedy Festival. She won a Herald Angel Award at the 2001 Edinburgh Festival Fringe and Time Out magazine's Comedy Performer of the Year Award in 2004.

She is a former manager of Sydney's Comedy Store venue.

== Personal life ==
Morris married British comedian Dan Thomas in Las Vegas on 31 December 2005. They divorced in 2022.

She was diagnosed with ADHD as an adult.

== Filmography ==
=== As actor ===
Year	Show	Role	Notes
1995–96	Full Frontal	Various characters	TV sketch show, 26 episodes (also writer)
2006	Not Going Out	Ruth	TV series, 1 episode
2012–17	House Husbands	Gemma Crabb	TV series, 58 episodes
2020	The Very Excellent Mr. Dundee	Carol Knight	Feature film
2022	DC League of Super-Pets	Keith	Animated film (Australian release)
2023	Double Parked	Dr. Foster	1 Episode (1.1)
2027	Stuck Up & Stupid		TV series

=== As herself ===
Year	Show	Role	Notes	
1999–2002	Beauty and the Beast	Panellist	TV talk show	
2003	QI	Guest	TV series, 1 episode	
2006	Test the Nation: Know Your Planet	Contestant - 'Celebrities' Team	TV series, 1 episode	
2006–07	Spicks and Specks	Guest	TV series, 2 episodes	
2007	Rove Live	Guest	TV talk show, 1 episode	
2007	Thank God You're Here	Guest	TV sketch show, 1 episode	
2008	Melbourne International Comedy Festival	Performer	TV special	
2008	It Takes Two	Contestant	TV series, 11 episodes	
2008–12	Good News Week	Panellist	TV series, 14 episodes	
2010	The Bonnie Hunt Show	Guest	TV series	
2010	Just For Laughs	Performer	TV special	
2010	Sleuth 101	Guest	TV series, 1 episode	
2011	The Celebrity Apprentice Australia	Contestant - Winner	TV series, 8 episodes	
2013	Australia's Got Talent	Host	TV series	
2015–2026	I'm a Celebrity...Get Me Out of Here!	Co-host	TV series	Alongside Chris Brown (2015–2023) and Robert Irwin (2024-2026)
2016, 2018	Have You Been Paying Attention?	Guest quizmaster	TV series, 2 episodes	
2018	Hughesy, We Have a Problem	Guest	1 episode	
2018	Blind Date	Host	TV series	
2019	Chris & Julia's Sunday Night Takeaway	Co-host	TV series	
2020	The Masked Singer Australia	Contestant	TV series, Season 2	
2023	Taskmaster Australia	Contestant	TV series, Season 1	
2023	Dogs Behaving (Very) Badly Australia	Narrator	TV series	
2026	Urzila	Self/Guest	TV seres	
