= Bola (name) =

Bola has been used as both a surname and a given name. Notable people with the name include:

== Given name ==
- Bola Abimbola (born c. 1968), vocalist from Lagos, Nigeria
- Bola Afonja (born 1943), Nigerian politician
- Bola Agbaje (born 1981), British playwright of Nigerian origin
- Bola Ajibola (born 1934), Attorney General and the Minister of Justice of Nigeria from 1985 to 1991
- Bola Akindele (born 1963), Nigerian entrepreneur, business strategist and philanthropist
- Bola Are (born 1954), Nigerian gospel singer
- Bola de Nieve (1911–1971), Cuban singer-pianist and songwriter
- Bola Ige (1930–2001), Nigerian lawyer and politician
- Bola Ikulayo (1948–2016), Nigerian professor of sport psychology
- Bola Johnson (1947–2014), Nigerian musician
- Bola Kuforiji-Olubi (1936–2016), Nigerian politician and banker
- Bola de Nieve (1911–1971), Cuban singer-pianist and songwriter
- Bola Odeleke (born 1950), Nigerian pastor
- Bola Ray (born 1977), Ghanaian radio and television personality and entrepreneur
- Bola Sete (1923–1987), Brazilian guitarist
- Bola Chittaranjan Das Shetty (1944–2016), Tulu and Kannada writer
- Bola Shagaya (born 1959), Nigerian businesswoman and fashion enthusiast
- Bola Sotunsa, Nigerian academic
- Bola Tinubu (born 1952), 16th president of Nigeria

== Surname ==
- Atasia Andu Bola, Congolese politician
- Bobo Bola (born 1985), Rwandan football player
- Kelemedi Bola (born 1981), Fijian rugby union footballer
- Marc Bola (born 1997), English professional footballer
- Olalekan Bola (born 1992), Nigerian footballer
- Samu Bola (born 1983), Fijian rugby union footballer
- Theresa Anyuat Bola, South Sudanese politician
- Tolaji Bola (born 1999), English football

== See also ==
- Bolla (name)
