= Bolus =

Bolus may refer to:

== Geography ==
- Bolus, Iran, a village in Ardabil Province, Iran
- Bolus, or Baulus, an Anatolian village on the site of ancient Berissa

== Medicine ==
- Food bolus, a ball-shaped mass moving through the digestive tract
- Bolus (medicine), the administration of a drug, medication or other substance in the form of a single, large dose
- Bolus (radiation therapy), a tissue equivalent substance used in radiation therapy
- Bolus tracking, technique used in computed tomography imaging, to visualise vessels more clearly
- Triple bolus test, a medical diagnostic procedure used to assess pituitary function

== People with the name ==
- Bolus of Mendes (3rd century BC), esoteric Greek philosopher
- Brian Bolus (1934–2020), former English cricketer who played in 7 Tests from 1963
- Frank Bolus (1864–1939), English cricketer for Somerset
- Harry Bolus (1834–1911), South African botanist, botanical artist, businessman and philanthropist
- Edward John Bolus (1897–?), poet, civil servant, and clergyman
- Louisa Bolus (Harriet Margaret Louisa Bolus née Kensit, 1877–1970), South African botanist
- Malvina Bolus (1906–1997), Canadian historian and art collector, and editor of the Hudson's Bay Company magazine The Beaver

== Other uses ==
- Bolus, a type of space tether, in spaceflight
- Bolus armenus, an example of a bole (a reddish soft variety of clay used as a pigment)
- Bolus Herbarium, an herbarium at the University of Cape Town established in 1865 from a donation by Harry Bolus
- Bolus hook, an instrument in a Jacquard loom
- Zeeuwse Bolus, a pastry from the Netherlands
- Bolus (Belgium), a Belgian pastry

== See also ==
- Bolas (disambiguation)
