= Bolu (disambiguation) =

Bolu may refer to:

- Bolu Province, in Turkey
  - Bolu, a city and the administrative center of the province
- Kue bolu or simply bolu, an Indonesian sponge cake
- Bolu Akinyode (born 1994), Nigerian professional footballer
- Bolu (album), an album by Tom Rosenthal

== See also ==
- Bolus (disambiguation)
- Bola (disambiguation)
- Bolo (disambiguation)
