= My Kitchen Rules series 6 =

My Kitchen Rules
- Series 6
- No. of episodes: 48

Release
- Original network: Seven Network
- Original release: 2 February – 4 May 2015

Series chronology
- ← Previous; Series 5 (2014) Next → Series 7 (2016)

The sixth season of the Australian competitive cooking competition show My Kitchen Rules premiered on the Seven Network on Monday 2 February 2015.

For the first time since 2012, My Kitchen Rules was beaten by MasterChef Australia in the 'Winner Announced' TV ratings.

== Format changes ==
- New Instant Restaurant Rounds
  - Colin's Secret Round — For the first time, six teams competed in a third group of instant restaurants with judge, Colin Fassnidge. It is the first time Colin has made an appearance in the instant restaurant round.
  - Redemption Round — The teams who placed 4th and 5th in their respective instant restaurant groups were combined and competed in another instant restaurant round.
- Challenge Round Format — After the People's Choice challenge, two teams are sent directly into Sudden Death, skipping the past process of a kitchen cook-off to determine the second team. As a result, teams who pass the People's Choice are deemed safe and the winner becomes safe from two eliminations.
- Judging Panel Changes — For the off-site People's Choice challenges, Colin Fassnidge joined Pete Evans as a co-judge for the teams cooking, while Manu is present for cook-offs held in Kitchen Headquarters. During Sudden Death Cook-Offs, Colin continues to be a part of the blind tasting panel, along with the regular three guest judges.

== Teams ==
State		Group	Members	Relationship	Status
New South Wales	NSW	3	Will & Steve	Gourmet Pommies	Winners 4 May (Grand Final)
Queensland	QLD	1	Jac & Shaz	Mt Isa Cousins	Runners-up 4 May (Grand Final)
Western Australia	WA	2	Eva & Debra	Workmates	Eliminated 3 May (Semi-Final 2)
Victoria	VIC	1	Ash Pollard & Camilla	Fashionable Friends	Eliminated 28 April (Semi-Final 1)
Western Australia	WA	3	Drasko & Bianca	Ambitious Couple	Eliminated 27 April (Top 5: UIR)
Victoria	VIC	3	Jane & Emma	Polar Opposites	Eliminated 19 April (Top 6)
Western Australia	WA	1	Kat & André	Dating	Eliminated 14 April (Top 7)
Victoria	VIC	2	Rose & Josh	Mother and Son	Eliminated 12 April (Top 8)
New South Wales	NSW	2	Carol & Adam	Newlyweds	Eliminated 7 April (Top 9)
Queensland	QLD	3	Rob & Dave	Mates	Eliminated 25 March (Top 10)
New South Wales	NSW	1	Robert & Lynzey	Father and Daughter	Eliminated 23 March (Top 11)
South Australia	SA	2	Vicky & Celine	Mother and Daughter	Withdrew 19 March (Top 12)
Queensland	QLD	2	Sheri & Emilie	Best Friends	Eliminated 18 March (Top 13)
South Australia	SA	1	Annie & Lloyd	High School Sweethearts	Eliminated 16 March (Top 14)
New South Wales	NSW	3	Katie & Nikki	Promo Girls	Eliminated 11 March (IR: Round 4)
Queensland	QLD	3	Lynn & Tony	Married Window Cleaners	Eliminated 2 March (IR: Round 3)
Victoria	VIC	2	Matt & Rob	Oyster Farmers	Eliminated 18 February (IR: Round 2)
Australian Capital Territory	ACT	1	Gina & Anna	Competitive Canberrans	Eliminated 10 February (IR: Round 1)

== Elimination history ==
Teams' Competition Progress
Round:	Instant Restaurants				Top 14	Top 13	Top 12 → Top 11	Top 10	Top 9	Top 8	Top 7	Top 6: Finals Decider		Top 5: UIR	Semi-Finals		Grand Final
Round:	1	2	3	4	Top 14	Top 13	Top 12 → Top 11	Top 10	Top 9	Top 8	Top 7	Cook-Off	Knockout	Top 5: UIR	1	2	Grand Final
Team	Progress																
Will & Steve	—N/a		**1st** (76)	—N/a	**Immune**	**People's**; **Choice**	**Immune**	**PC** (Safe)	**SD** (47)	**PC** (Safe)	**PC** (Safe)	**HQ** (Safe)	→	**1st** (79)	**1st** (48)	—N/a	**Winners** (52)
Jac & Shaz	**3rd** (59)	—N/a	—N/a	—N/a	**PC** (Safe)	**PC** (Safe)	**People's**; **Choice**	**Immune**	**PC** (Safe)	**People's**; **Choice**	**Immune**	**HQ** (Safe)	→	**2nd** (65)	—N/a	**1st** (49)	**Runners-up** (50)
Eva & Debra	—N/a	**5th** (46)	—N/a	**1st** (98)	**Immune**	**SD** (45)	**PC** (Safe)	**PC** (Safe)	**People's**; **Choice**	**Immune**	**SD** (41)	**HQ** (Lose)	**SD** (51)	**3rd** (63)	—N/a	**2nd** (44)	**Eliminated** (Episode 47)
Ash & Camilla	**2nd** (68)	—N/a	—N/a	—N/a	**People's**; **Choice**	**Immune**	**PC** (Safe)	**PC** (Safe)	**PC** (Safe)	**PC** (Safe)	**PC** (Safe)	**HQ** (Lose)	**HQ** (Safe)	**4th** (62)	**2nd** (44)	**Eliminated** (Episode 46)	
Drasko & Bianca	—N/a		**3rd** (70)	—N/a	**PC** (Safe)	**PC** (Safe)	**PC** (Safe)	**PC** (Safe)	**PC** (Safe)	**SD** (46)	**People's**; **Choice**	**HQ** (Safe)	→	**5th** (51)	**Eliminated** (Episode 45)		
Jane & Emma	—N/a		**5th** (56)	**2nd** (92)	**PC** (Safe)	**PC** (Safe)	**PC** (Safe)	**SD** (49)	**PC** (Safe)	**PC** (Safe)	**PC** (Safe)	**HQ** (Lose)	**SD** (45)	**Eliminated** (Episode 40)			
Kat & André	**4th** (58)	—N/a	—N/a	**5th** (57)	**PC** (Safe)	**PC** (Safe)	**PC** (Safe)	**PC** (Safe)	**PC** (Safe)	**PC** (Safe)	**SD** (30)	**Eliminated** (Episode 38)					
Rose & Josh	—N/a	**3rd** (66)	—N/a	—N/a	**PC** (Safe)	**PC** (Safe)	**PC** (Safe)	**People's**; **Choice**	**Immune**	**SD** (34)	**Eliminated** (Episode 36)						
Carol & Adam	—N/a	**1st** (77)	—N/a	—N/a	**Immune**	**PC** (Safe)	**PC** (Safe)	**PC** (Safe)	**SD** (40)	**Eliminated** (Episode 34)							
Rob & Dave	—N/a		**2nd** (71)	—N/a	**PC** (Safe)	**PC** (Safe)	**SD** (46)	**SD** (45)	**Eliminated** (Episode 32)								
Robert & Lynzey	**1st** (90)	—N/a	—N/a	—N/a	**Immune**	**PC** (Safe)	**SD** (41)	**Eliminated** (Episode 30)									
Vicky & Celine	—N/a	**2nd** (73)	—N/a	—N/a	**SD** (27)	**PC** (Safe)	**Withdrew due to medical issues** (Episode 29)										
Sheri & Emilie	—N/a	**4th** (63)	—N/a	**3rd** (66)	**PC** (Safe)	**SD** (41)	**Eliminated** (Episode 28)										
Annie & Lloyd	**5th** (45)	—N/a	—N/a	**4th** (59)	**SD** (22)	**Eliminated** (Episode 26)											
Katie & Nikki	—N/a		**4th** (57)	**6th** (52)	**Eliminated** (Episode 24)												
Lynn & Tony	—N/a		**6th** (48)	**Eliminated** (Episode 18)													
Matt & Rob	—N/a	**6th** (45)	**Eliminated** (Episode 12)														
Gina & Anna	**6th** (40)	**Eliminated** (Episode 6)															

Cell Descriptions
	Team won a challenge, People's Choice, cooked the best dish or received the highest score for the round.
	Team lost a challenge, cooked the weakest dish or received a low score and must compete in an additional round or challenge.
Safe	Team was safe from elimination after passing a challenge. (If applicable, team was safe after the challenge listed in bold); **PC** = People's Choice, **HQ** = Kitchen Headquarters challenge, **SD** = Sudden Death
→	Team advanced to next round.
**SD**	Team competed in a Sudden Death Cook-Off and became safe from elimination.
**SD**	Team was eliminated after losing in a Sudden Death Cook-Off or round.
**Immune**	From winning the previous challenge, the team was immune from elimination and was not required to participate.
**Withdrew**	Team withdrew from the competition voluntarily.
—N/a	Results do not apply as the team was not allocated to this challenge or round.

== Competition details ==
=== Instant Restaurants ===
During the Instant Restaurant rounds, each team hosts a three-course dinner for judges and fellow teams in their allocated group. They are scored and ranked among their group, with the lowest scoring team being eliminated.

==== Round 1 ====
- Episodes 1 to 6
- Airdate — 2 February to 10 February
- Description — The first of the two instant restaurant groups are introduced into the competition in Round 1. The lowest scoring team at the end of this round is eliminated.

Instant Restaurant Summary
Group 1
Team and Episode Details		Guest Scores						Pete's Scores			Manu's Scores			Total (out of 110)	Rank	Result
Team and Episode Details		J&S	K&A	R&L	A&C	A&L	G&A	Entrée	Main	Dessert	Entrée	Main	Dessert	Total (out of 110)	Rank	Result
QLD	Jac & Shaz	—	6	6	5	5	6	8	5	3	8	4	3	59	3rd	Safe
Ep 1	2 February	Stack														Safe
Dishes	Entrée	Zucchini & Potato Rosti Stack with Smoked Salmon and Crème Fraîche														Safe
Dishes	Main	Rack of Lamb with Crushed Potatoes and Lemon Green Beans														Safe
Dishes	Dessert	Pear & Walnut Crumble with Pear Wafers														Safe
WA	Kat & Andre	6	—	5	6	5	5	6	4	6	6	4	5	58	4th	Through to Round 4
Ep 2	3 February	Fin & Tonic														Through to Round 4
Dishes	Entrée	Smoked Cod with Crunchy Mash, Cabbage and Leek														Through to Round 4
Dishes	Main	Crayfish Ravioli with Roasted Tomato Sauce														Through to Round 4
Dishes	Dessert	Chocolate Tart with Raspberries and Cream														Through to Round 4
NSW	Robert & Lynzey	8	8	—	8	8	9	10	8	9	10	7	5	90	1st	Safe
Ep 3	4 February	Tejas														Safe
Dishes	Entrée	Quail Legs with Ranch Dressing and Jalapeño Poppers														Safe
Dishes	Main	Peppered Beef with Texas Green Beans and BBQ Corn with Garlic Butter														Safe
Dishes	Dessert	Bourbon Bread Pudding with Vanilla Bean Ice Cream														Safe
VIC	Ash & Camilla	7	2	7	—	6	6	6	10	3	7	9	5	68	2nd	Safe
Ep 4	8 February	Dans La Maison														Safe
Dishes	Entrée	Steak Tartare with Quail Egg and Crostoli														Safe
Dishes	Main	Bouillabaisse with Rouille and Baguette														Safe
Dishes	Dessert	Fondant au Chocolat with Hazelnut Ice Cream														Safe
SA	Annie & Lloyd	6	2	4	4	—	3	3	3	7	3	2	8	45	5th	Through to Round 4
Ep 5	9 February	Mystic Hollow														Through to Round 4
Dishes	Entrée	Beef Madras Coconut Buns with Yoghurt Dipping Sauce														Through to Round 4
Dishes	Main	Sea Bream Baked in Parchment with Saffron Rice														Through to Round 4
Dishes	Dessert	Rosewater Mousse with Almond Tuile and Crystallised Petals														Through to Round 4
ACT	Gina & Anna	3	4	3	4	2	—	4	3	2	4	5	4	40	6th	Eliminated
Ep 6	10 February	Aquazure														Eliminated
Dishes	Entrée	Salt & Pepper Flathead Fillets with Lime Aioli and Salad														Eliminated
Dishes	Main	Pasta (Originally Rotolo of Gnocchi) & Duck Ragù with Crispy Sage														Eliminated
Dishes	Dessert	Crème Pâtissière Tarts with Prunes in Port Syrup														Eliminated

==== Round 2 ====
- Episodes 7 to 12
- Airdate — 11 February to 18 February
- Description — The second group now start their Instant Restaurant round. The same rules from the previous round apply and the lowest scoring team is eliminated.

Instant Restaurant Summary
Group 2
Team and Episode Details		Guest Scores						Pete's Scores			Manu's Scores			Total (out of 110)	Rank	Result
Team and Episode Details		S&E	E&D	C&A	M&R	R&J	V&C	Entrée	Main	Dessert	Entrée	Main	Dessert	Total (out of 110)	Rank	Result
QLD	Sheri & Emilie	—	5	5	6	6	5	5	7	6	5	8	5	63	4th	Through to Round 4
Ep 7	11 February	Finders Keepers														Through to Round 4
Dishes	Entrée	Fish Tortillas														Through to Round 4
Dishes	Main	Pork Belly with Horseradish Mash and Mum's Essential Greens														Through to Round 4
Dishes	Dessert	Dunking Doughnuts														Through to Round 4
WA	Eva & Debra	4	—	4	4	4	5	3	6	3	6	5	2	46	5th	Through to Round 4
Ep 8	12 February	Spice Market														Through to Round 4
Dishes	Entrée	Pork and Spinach Wontons in Ginger Broth														Through to Round 4
Dishes	Main	Nasi Lemak with Fried Chicken														Through to Round 4
Dishes	Dessert	Pandan Crème Brûlée														Through to Round 4
NSW	Carol & Adam	7	7	—	8	7	7	4	7	9	6	7	8	77	1st	Safe
Ep 9	15 February	40 Love														Safe
Dishes	Entrée	Lobster Rice Paper Rolls with Sesame Lime Sauce														Safe
Dishes	Main	Stir-Fried Prawns in XO Sauce														Safe
Dishes	Dessert	Baked Raspberry Ripple Cheesecake														Safe
VIC	Matt & Rob	5	4	5	—	6	6	3	2	4	3	2	5	45	6th	Eliminated
Ep 10	16 February	Salt and Soil														Eliminated
Dishes	Entrée	Oysters Three Ways														Eliminated
Dishes	Main	Prosciutto Wrapped Quail with Kale, Orange & Walnut Salad														Eliminated
Dishes	Dessert	Homemade Brownie with Strawberries and Cream														Eliminated
VIC	Rose & Josh	5	7	7	7	—	6	9	4	4	8	5	4	66	3rd	Safe
Ep 11	17 February	Mi Cocina														Safe
Dishes	Entrée	Chorizo Stuffed Calamari with Tomato and Garlic Sauce														Safe
Dishes	Main	Paella														Safe
Dishes	Dessert	Apple and Cinnamon Empanadas with Chocolate Sauce														Safe
SA	Vicky & Celine	9	8	6	7	6	—	7	8	3	7	8	4	73	2nd	Safe
Ep 12	18 February	Kali Orexi														Safe
Dishes	Entrée	Chargrilled Octopus and Broad Bean Salad with Red Wine Dressing														Safe
Dishes	Main	Lahanodolmathes with Avgolemono Sauce														Safe
Dishes	Dessert	Chocolate Baklava Cigars with Salted Caramel Sauce														Safe

==== Round 3: Colin's Secret Round ====
- Episodes 13 to 18
- Airdate — 19 February to 2 March
- Description — A new group of 6 teams entered the competition and competed in a 'secret round' of instant restaurants. This round was not judged by Pete and Manu, but instead by Colin Fassnidge. The same rules applied and the lowest scoring team is eliminated. Since Colin was the only judge for this round his Scores were doubled.

Instant Restaurant Summary
Group 3
Team and Episode Details		Guest Scores						Colin's Scores			Total (out of 110)	Rank	Result
Team and Episode Details		D&B	R&D	L&T	J&E	W&S	K&N	Entrée	Main	Dessert	Total (out of 110)	Rank	Result
WA	Drasko & Bianca	—	7	6	7	5	7	10	14	14	70	3rd	Safe
Ep 13	19 February	Wild Pastures											Safe
Dishes	Entrée	Barbecued Marron with Thai Green Mango Salad											Safe
Dishes	Main	Venison with Celeriac Purée and Witlof Salad											Safe
Dishes	Dessert	Sour Apple Parfait with Apple Marshmallow and Salted Peanut Shards											Safe
QLD	Rob & Dave	6	—	7	6	6	6	20	8	12	71	2nd	Safe
Ep 14	23 February	Evans and Mac											Safe
Dishes	Entrée	Mushroom Ravioli in Porcini Broth											Safe
Dishes	Main	Fennel and Thyme Stuffed Porchetta with Roasted Vegetables											Safe
Dishes	Dessert	Chocolate Éclair with Strawberries and Cream											Safe
QLD	Lynn & Tony	4	6	—	3	4	5	6	8	12	48	6th	Eliminated
Ep 15	24 February	The Serengeti											Eliminated
Dishes	Entrée	Peri Peri Prawns with Cucumber & Apple Salad											Eliminated
Dishes	Main	Poor Man's Bolo with Sweet Potato Maize and Crispy Green Beans											Eliminated
Dishes	Dessert	Pharaoh's Money Bags, Mascarpone and Fig Filo Pastry											Eliminated
VIC	Jane & Emma	5	5	5	—	5	6	8	12	10	56	5th	Through to Round 4
Ep 16	25 February	Wisteria											Through to Round 4
Dishes	Entrée	Eggplant Arancini with Arrabiata Sauce and Parmesan Crisp											Through to Round 4
Dishes	Main	Salmon with Potato Stack and Lime Vinaigrette											Through to Round 4
Dishes	Dessert	Fig and Honey Ice-Cream Sandwich with Almond Praline											Through to Round 4
NSW	Will & Steve	7	6	5	7	—	7	18	16	10	76	1st	Safe
Ep 17	26 February	The China Plate											Safe
Dishes	Entrée	Scotch Egg with Herb Mayonnaise											Safe
Dishes	Main	Fish and Thrice-Cooked Chips with Peas and Liquor											Safe
Dishes	Dessert	Mrs. Stewart's Chocolate and Hazelnut Roulade											Safe
NSW	Katie & Nikki	5	6	3	5	4	—	6	14	14	57	4th	Through to Round 4
Ep 18	2 March	Sassy											Through to Round 4
Dishes	Entrée	Croatian Hot Pot with Homemade Sausage											Through to Round 4
Dishes	Main	Spatchcock with Pomegranate Salad and Couscous											Through to Round 4
Dishes	Dessert	Deconstructed Lemon Tart											Through to Round 4

==== Round 4: Redemption Round ====
- Episodes 19 to 24
- Airdate — 3 March to 11 March
- Description — The 4th and 5th placed teams from the previous three groups must cook again in a redemption round. Pete and Manu return as the judges, and the lowest scoring team is eliminated.

Instant Restaurant Summary
Group 4
Team and Episode Details		Guest Scores						Pete's Scores			Manu's Scores			Total (out of 110)	Rank	Result
Team and Episode Details		A&L	S&E	J&E	K&A	E&D	K&N	Entrée	Main	Dessert	Entrée	Main	Dessert	Total (out of 110)	Rank	Result
SA	Annie & Lloyd	—	4	5	6	4	5	6	8	3	7	9	2	59	4th	Safe
Ep 19	3 March	Mystic Hollow														Safe
Dishes	Entrée	Goat's Cheese, Caramelised Onion and Pine Nut Tart														Safe
Dishes	Main	Lamb Rack with Green Olive Gremolata and Pommes Dauphines														Safe
Dishes	Dessert	Espresso Cheesecake														Safe
QLD	Sheri & Emilie	4	—	6	6	8	7	7	6	4	7	6	5	66	3rd	Safe
Ep 20	4 March	Finders Keepers														Safe
Dishes	Entrée	Mushroom Crêpes														Safe
Dishes	Main	Deconstructed Lamb Shank and Sherry Pie														Safe
Dishes	Dessert	Rhubarb and Strawberry Upside-Down Cake with Crème Anglaise														Safe
VIC	Jane & Emma	7	9	—	8	9	8	9	10	7	9	9	7	92	2nd	Safe
Ep 21	5 March	Wisteria														Safe
Dishes	Entrée	Pumpkin Ravioli with Sage Butter														Safe
Dishes	Main	Pork Cheek with Apple Cider Jus, Crackling and Potato Croquette														Safe
Dishes	Dessert	Lemon Friand with Lemon Curd and Blueberries														Safe
WA	Kat & Andre	3	4	5	—	4	5	8	2	8	8	2	8	57	5th	Safe
Ep 22	9 March	Fin & Tonic														Safe
Dishes	Entrée	Veal Involtini														Safe
Dishes	Main	Zuppa di Pesce with Homemade Bread														Safe
Dishes	Dessert	Île Flottante														Safe
WA	Eva & Debra	8	10	8	8	—	9	10	10	8	10	10	7	98	1st	Safe
Ep 23	10 March	Spice Market														Safe
Dishes	Entrée	Prawn Cakes with Peanut & Lime Dipping Sauce														Safe
Dishes	Main	Keralan Fish Molee with Lemon Rice														Safe
Dishes	Dessert	Kulfi with Rosewater Syrup, Pistachios and Jelly														Safe
NSW	Katie & Nikki	4	4	5	1	3	—	5	8	5	5	7	5	52	6th	Eliminated
Ep 24	11 March	Sassy														Eliminated
Dishes	Entrée	Chicken Liver with Potato Rösti and Garlic Spinach														Eliminated
Dishes	Main	Pork Cutlet with Bacon Sauerkraut and Onion Knödel														Eliminated
Dishes	Dessert	Kick-Ass Apple Pie with Burnt Butter Ice-Cream														Eliminated

=== Top 14 ===
==== People's Choice 1: Camping Challenge ====
- Episode 25
- Airdate — 12 March 2015
- Location — The Basin, New South Wales
- Description — The teams headed into the first challenge to serve a breakfast dish for 200 hungry campers. The campers voted for their favourite dish and the team with the most votes received People's Choice, sending that team safe from two eliminations. Judges Pete and Colin sent the two weakest teams directly into the first Sudden Death Cook-Off. Teams who won the previous instant restaurant rounds were automatically safe from elimination and did not participate in this challenge. All other surviving teams advance to the Top 13.

Challenge summary
People's Choice 1
Team		Dish	Result
NSW	Carol & Adam	—N/a	Safe (Immunity)
WA	Eva & Debra	—N/a	Safe (Immunity)
NSW	Robert & Lynzey	—N/a	Safe (Immunity)
NSW	Will & Steve	—N/a	Safe (Immunity)
VIC	Ash & Camilla	Chilli Scrambled Eggs with Salmon and Chive Hollandaise	People's Choice
WA	Drasko & Bianca	Spicy Pork and Egg Tortilla with Avocado Salsa	Safe (Through to Top 13)
QLD	Jac & Shaz	American-Style Pancakes with Caramelised Banana and Coconut Crumb	Safe (Through to Top 13)
VIC	Jane & Emma	Blueberry Ricotta Hotcakes with Berry Compote and Candied Pecans	Safe (Through to Top 13)
WA	Kat & Andre	Smoked Ham and Gruyère Bake with Tomato Relish	Safe (Through to Top 13)
QLD	Rob & Dave	Zucchini and Corn Fritters with Maple Bacon and Tomato Salsa	Safe (Through to Top 13)
VIC	Rose & Josh	Ricotta Fritters with Tomato Relish, Rocket and Feta	Safe (Through to Top 13)
QLD	Sheri & Emilie	Spinach, Feta and Mushroom Gözleme	Safe (Through to Top 13)
SA	Annie & Lloyd	Lamb Meatballs with Vegetable Stew and Bubble and Squeak	Through to Sudden Death
SA	Vicky & Celine	Greek Baked Eggs with Dill and Garlic Flatbread	Through to Sudden Death

==== Sudden Death Cook-Off 1 ====
- Episode 26
- Airdate — 16 March 2015
- Description — Annie & Lloyd and Vicky & Celine did not impress the judges at the Camping Challenge, so they must go head to head in the first Sudden Death Cook-Off. The team with the lower score will be eliminated and the surviving team will proceed through to the Top 13.

Sudden Death cook-off results
Team		Judge's scores						Total (out of 60)	Result
Team		Karen	Guy	Liz	Colin	Pete	Manu	Total (out of 60)	Result
SA	Vicky & Celine	5	5	5	4	4	4	27	Safe
Dishes	Entree	Grilled Lemon and Garlic Prawn Skewers with Chilli Mayonnaise							Safe
Dishes	Main	Beef Moussaka with Greek Salad							Safe
Dishes	Dessert	Rosewater Rizogalo							Safe
SA	Annie & Lloyd	4	4	4	3	3	4	22	Eliminated
Dishes	Entree	Grilled Squid with Fennel and Pomegranate Salad							Eliminated
Dishes	Main	Miso Salmon with Tempura Mushrooms							Eliminated
Dishes	Dessert	Chocolate Pudding with Salted Caramel Ice-Cream							Eliminated

=== Top 13 ===
==== People's Choice 2: Farmer's Challenge ====
- Episode 27
- Airdate — 17 March 2015
- Location — Australia
- Description — Teams cooked for the farmers, highlighting their produce as a way of saying thanks for all their hard work supplying it. Teams were each allocated a main ingredient to highlight in their dish and were split into two groups, first group cooking savoury and the second cooking sweets. Farmer's voted for the favourite dish awarding one team the Farmer's Choice, making them safe from two eliminations, while the judges sent to two weakest teams into Sudden Death.

Challenge summary
People's Choice 2
Team		Ingredient	Dish	Result
VIC	Ash & Camilla	—N/a		Safe (Immunity)
NSW	Will & Steve	Rhubarb	Riesling Poached Rhubarb with Ginger Biscuits	Farmer's Choice
NSW	Carol & Adam	Salmon	Baked Salmon with Ruby Grapefruit Salad	Safe (Through to Top 12)
WA	Drasko & Bianca	Chilli	Nan's Burmese Chilli Prawn Curry	Safe (Through to Top 12)
QLD	Jac & Shaz	Citrus	Spiced Orange Cakes with Citrus Syrup	Safe (Through to Top 12)
VIC	Jane & Emma	Nuts	Layered Hazelnut Cake with Frangelico Cream	Safe (Through to Top 12)
WA	Kat & Andre	Mushroom	Pork and Mushroom Cabbage Rolls with Mushroom Sauce	Safe (Through to Top 12)
QLD	Rob & Dave	Apple	Apple Amandine with Apple Sabayon	Safe (Through to Top 12)
NSW	Robert & Lynzey	Peach	Upside-Down Peach Cobbler with Peach Schnapps Custard	Safe (Through to Top 12)
VIC	Rose & Josh	Beetroot	Roast Beetroot Fettuccine with Caramelised Pears and Blue Cheese	Safe (Through to Top 12)
SA	Vicky & Celine	Lamb	Marinated Lamb Cutlets with Mediterranean Couscous	Safe (Through to Top 12)
WA	Eva & Debra	Beef	Smoked Beef and Asian Noodle Salad	Through to Sudden Death
QLD	Sheri & Emilie	Berries	Mixed Berry Wagon Wheels	Through to Sudden Death

==== Sudden Death Cook-Off 2 ====
- Episode 28
- Airdate — 18 March 2015
- Description — Eva & Debra and Sheri & Emilie must compete in the second Sudden Death Cook-Off after they disappointed the judges at the Farmer's Challenge. The lower scoring team will be eliminated and the surviving team proceeds to the Top 12.

Sudden Death cook-off results
Team		Judge's scores						Total (out of 60)	Result
Team		Karen	Guy	Liz	Colin	Pete	Manu	Total (out of 60)	Result
WA	Eva & Debra	8	8	8	7	7	7	45	Safe
Dishes	Entree	Steamed Mussels with Lemongrass, Ginger and Chilli							Safe
Dishes	Main	Mum’s Chicken Curry							Safe
Dishes	Dessert	Steamed Banana Cake with Salted Caramel							Safe
QLD	Sheri & Emilie	7	7	7	6	7	7	41	Eliminated
Dishes	Entree	Beef Carpaccio with Truffle Mayonnaise							Eliminated
Dishes	Main	Prawn Linguine							Eliminated
Dishes	Dessert	Cherry Crostata with Ginger Cream							Eliminated

=== Top 12 → Top 11 ===
This should be the Top 12 round, however after team Vicky and Celine voluntarily withdrew from the competition because of Celine's bad health condition, it has become the Top 11 round.

==== People's Choice 3: Pub Crawl ====
- Episode 29
- Airdate — 19 March 2015
- Location — Balmain, New South Wales
- Description — Teams took charge of pubs around Balmain in Sydney to cook for the lunch-time pub crawl and had to prepare meals to service for paying customers. Two teams were assigned to a pub, and diners paid for what they believed the meal was worth. The team who raises the most money is awarded People's Choice and like the previous rounds, judges Pete and Colin sent the weakest two teams to Sudden Death.

Challenge summary
People's Choice 3
Team		Dish	Result
NSW	Will & Steve	—N/a	Safe (Immunity)
QLD	Jac & Shaz	Chargrilled Lamb with Roasted Vegetable and Feta Salad	People's Choice
VIC	Ash & Camila	Pittsburgh Rare with French Fries, Mushy Peas and Café de Paris Butter	Safe (Through to Top 10)
NSW	Carol & Adam	Pink Ling En Papillote	Safe (Through to Top 10)
WA	Drasko & Bianca	Mexican Pork Ribs with White Beans and Pickled Onions	Safe (Through to Top 10)
WA	Eva & Debra	Fish and Sweet Potato Chips with Chilli Mayonnaise	Safe (Through to Top 10)
VIC	Jane & Emma	Kangaroo Fillet with Cauliflower Purée and Red Wine Jus	Safe (Through to Top 10)
WA	Kat & Andre	Snapper with Carrot Purée, Duck Fat Potatoes and Tomato Salsa	Safe (Through to Top 10)
VIC	Rose & Josh	Stuffed Chicken Breast with Chilli Breadcrumbs and Polenta Chips	Safe (Through to Top 10)
QLD	Rob & Dave	Butter Chicken with Saffron Rice and Flatbread	Through to Sudden Death
NSW	Robert & Lynzey	Spicy Beef Fajitas with Jalapeño Pico de Gallo	Through to Sudden Death
SA	Vicky & Celine	Withdrew due to medical issues	

==== Sudden Death Cook-Off 3 ====
- Episode 30
- Airdate — 23 March 2015
- Description — Rob & Dave and Robert & Lynzey failed to impress the judges at the Pub Crawl, so they have to compete against each other in a Sudden Death Cook-Off, where one team will be eliminated. The other team goes through to the Top 10.

Sudden Death cook-off results
Team		Judge's scores						Total (out of 60)	Result
Team		Karen	Guy	Liz	Colin	Pete	Manu	Total (out of 60)	Result
QLD	Rob & Dave	8	8	8	7	8	7	46	Safe
Dishes	Entree	Chargrilled Seafood in Tomato and Basil Consommé							Safe
Dishes	Main	Stuffed Chicken Breast with Brussels Sprouts and Parsnip Purée							Safe
Dishes	Dessert	Honey and Ginger Fig with Shortbread and Pistachio Syrup							Safe
NSW	Robert & Lynzey	7	7	7	6	7	7	41	Eliminated
Dishes	Entree	Fried Goat's Cheese with Strawberries and Balsamic							Eliminated
Dishes	Main	Wagyu Eye Fillet with Caramelised Onions and Potato Purée							Eliminated
Dishes	Dessert	Beetroot and Blood Orange Parfait with Raspberry Sorbet							Eliminated

=== Top 10 ===
==== People's Choice 4: Wedding Challenge ====
- Episode 31
- Airdate — 24 March 2015
- Location — Burnham Grove, Cawdor, New South Wales
- Description — For this challenge, the teams catered for a wedding reception with a Modern Australian theme in mind. Three teams focused on one course each (entree, main, dessert), with 90 minutes prep time and then 30 minutes for service per course. All guests voted for the People's Choice and judges Pete and Colin sent the weakest two teams to Sudden Death.

Challenge summary
People's Choice 4
Team		Course	Dish	Result
QLD	Jac & Shaz	—N/a		Safe (Immunity)
VIC	Rose & Josh	Dessert	White Chocolate Custard with Berry Compote and Macadamia Crumb	People's Choice
VIC	Ash & Camilla	Entrée	Confit of Ocean Trout with Whipped Caviar and Ginger Broth	Safe (Through to Top 9)
NSW	Carol & Adam	Dessert	Citrus Celebration	Safe (Through to Top 9)
WA	Drasko & Bianca	Entrée	Duck Breast with Beetroot, Cherry and Chocolate	Safe (Through to Top 9)
WA	Eva & Debra	Main	Dukkah-Crusted Lamb with Sweet Pumpkin Purée and Mint Yoghurt	Safe (Through to Top 9)
WA	Kat & Andre	Main	Pork Fillet with Orange and Fennel Slaw and Potato Rösti	Safe (Through to Top 9)
NSW	Will & Steve	Entrée	Chicken Liver Parfait with Raisin Purée and Fennel Lavosh	Safe (Through to Top 9)
VIC	Jane & Emma	Dessert	Ricotta Cheesecake with Raspberry and Blood Orange	Through to Sudden Death
QLD	Rob & Dave	Main	Butter-Poached Eye Fillet with Cauliflower Purée and Mushroom Sauce	Through to Sudden Death

==== Sudden Death Cook-Off 4 ====
- Episode 32
- Airdate — 25 March 2015
- Description — After a poor performance at the Wedding Challenge, Jane and Emma face against Rob and Dave in the Sudden Death Cook-Off. For Rob and Dave, they are the first team so far to compete in a Sudden Death Cook-Off more than once. The lower scoring team is eliminated and the surviving team proceeds to the Top 9.

Sudden Death cook-off results
Team		Judge's scores						Total (out of 60)	Result
Team		Karen	Guy	Liz	Colin	Pete	Manu	Total (out of 60)	Result
VIC	Jane & Emma	8	8	9	8	8	8	49	Safe
Dishes	Entree	Green Papaya Salad with Salt and Pepper Prawns							Safe
Dishes	Main	Lamb Ragù with Fettuccine and Pea Pesto							Safe
Dishes	Dessert	Bombolini with Raspberry Coulis and Crème Anglaise							Safe
QLD	Rob & Dave	8	7	7	7	8	8	45	Eliminated
Dishes	Entree	Open Lobster Ravioli							Eliminated
Dishes	Main	Stuffed Blue-Eye Trevalla on Soft Polenta with Warm Salsa Verde							Eliminated
Dishes	Dessert	Mini Pavlova with Passionfruit and Raspberries							Eliminated

=== Top 9 ===
==== People's Choice 5: Garden Challenge ====
- Episode 33
- Airdate — 6 April 2015
- Location — Melbourne, Victoria
- Description — Teams created canapés for a harvest party using the fresh produce from pop-up garden patches located in Melbourne's St Kilda and Federation Square. The team with the most votes will be People's Choice and safe from the next two eliminations, whilst the two weakest teams head to the next Sudden Death Cook-Off, where one team will be eliminated.

Challenge summary
People's Choice 5
Team		Dish	Result
VIC	Rose & Josh	—N/a	Safe (Immunity)
WA	Eva & Debra	Crispy Barramundi with Apple and Mango Salad	Gardener's Choice
VIC	Ash & Camilla	Lamb Cutlets with Fondant Potatoes and Beetroot Purée	Safe (Through to Top 8)
WA	Drasko & Bianca	Asian Mushroom Risotto	Safe (Through to Top 8)
QLD	Jac & Shaz	Wasabi Chicken with Asian Slaw	Safe (Through to Top 8)
VIC	Jane & Emma	Beetroot with Goats Cheese Mousse and Herb Biscuit	Safe (Through to Top 8)
WA	Kat & Andre	Hoisin Beef Steamed Bun with Pickled Radish	Safe (Through to Top 8)
NSW	Carol & Adam	Waldorf Prawn Cocktail	Through to Sudden Death
NSW	Will & Steve	Shallot Tarte Tatin with Crispy Skin Duck, Mustard Crème Fraîche and Vegetables	Through to Sudden Death

==== Sudden Death Cook-Off 5 ====
- Episode 34
- Airdate — 7 April 2015
- Description — Will & Steve and Carol & Adam must compete against each other in the Sudden Death Cook-Off, after a poor performance at the Garden Challenge. The lower scoring team will be eliminated and the surviving team will go through to the Top 8.

Sudden Death cook-off results
Team		Judge's scores						Total (out of 60)	Result
Team		Karen	Guy	Liz	Colin	Pete	Manu	Total (out of 60)	Result
NSW	Will & Steve	8	8	8	7	8	8	47	Safe
Dishes	Entree	Zucchini Flowers with Whipped Goat's Curd and Burnt Butter							Safe
Dishes	Main	Roast Spatchcock with Orange and Ginger Carrots and Bread Sauce							Safe
Dishes	Dessert	Textures of Blood Orange with White Chocolate Mascarpone and Coconut Tuile							Safe
NSW	Carol & Adam	7	7	7	6	7	6	40	Eliminated
Dishes	Entree	Seared Scallops with Miso and Ginger Sauce and Pickled Mushrooms							Eliminated
Dishes	Main	Goji Stuffed Pork Fillet with Daikon							Eliminated
Dishes	Dessert	Crisp Apple Cigars with Cinnamon Ice-Cream							Eliminated

=== Top 8 ===
==== People's Choice 6: Luna Park Challenge ====
- Episode 35
- Airdate — 8 April 2015
- Location — Luna Park Sydney
- Description — Teams headed to Sydney's Luna Park to serve fairground food to emergency service workers and families for the annual 'Give Back' day. The public voted for their favourite dish sending that team straight to the Top 6 as the bottom two compete in another Sudden Death.

Challenge summary
People's Choice 6
Team		Dish	Result
WA	Eva & Debra	—N/a	Safe (Immunity)
QLD	Jac & Shaz	Banana Spring Roll with Coconut Custard and Caramel Popcorn	People's Choice
VIC	Ash & Camilla	Pork, Fennel and Apple Sausage Rolls	Safe (Through to Top 7)
VIC	Jane & Emma	Popcorn Chicken and Ranch Dipping Sauce	Safe (Through to Top 7)
WA	Kat & Andre	Mini-Hamburgers with Deep Fried Pickles	Safe (Through to Top 7)
NSW	Will & Steve	Beef Bombs with Roasted Chilli Mayonnaise	Safe (Through to Top 7)
WA	Drasko & Bianca	Chicken Satay with Mango Relish	Through to Sudden Death
VIC	Rose & Josh	Churros with Dulce de Leche and Raspberry Coulis	Through to Sudden Death

==== Sudden Death Cook-Off 6 ====
- Episode 36
- Airdate — 12 April 2015
- Description — Unfortunately, Drasko & Bianca and Rose & Josh didn't impress the judges in the Luna Park Challenge. They now must compete in a Sudden Death Cook-Off. The lower scoring team will be eliminated and the safe team will advance to the Top 7.

Sudden Death cook-off results
Team		Judge's scores						Total (out of 60)	Result
Team		Karen	Guy	Liz	Colin	Pete	Manu	Total (out of 60)	Result
WA	Drasko & Bianca	8	8	8	7	7	8	46	Safe
Dishes	Entree	Sardines with Crispy Pig's Ears							Safe
Dishes	Main	Rock Lobster with Confit Chicken Wings and Yellow Curry Sauce							Safe
Dishes	Dessert	Chocolate Torte with Turmeric Ice-Cream and Candied Orange							Safe
VIC	Rose & Josh	6	5	6	5	6	6	34	Eliminated
Dishes	Entree	Beef and Chorizo Empanadas with Salsa Brava							Eliminated
Dishes	Main	Caper and Parsley Crusted Lamb with Pearl Couscous							Eliminated
Dishes	Dessert	Double Chocolate Mousse							Eliminated

=== Top 7 ===
==== People's Choice 7: Jetstar In-Flight Challenge ====
- Episode 37
- Airdate — 13 April 2015
- Location — Sydney Airport, Jetstar Flight JQ7001
- Description — For this challenge teams prepared and cooked in-flight meals for Jetstar flight passengers. Each team prepared 40 portions of their meal to be served to on-board passengers for scoring out of 10. The team who receives the highest score, wins the Passenger's choice and will have their meal served on select Jetstar flights for three months. The judges once again sent the two weakest teams to Sudden Death.

Challenge summary
People's Choice 7
Team		Dish	Result
QLD	Jac & Shaz	—N/a	Safe (Immunity)
WA	Drasko & Bianca	Middle Eastern Lamb with Saffron Cauliflower	Passenger's Choice
VIC	Ash & Camilla	Manzo Tonnato with Asparagus	Safe (Through to Top 6)
VIC	Jane & Emma	Chicken Rice Paper Rolls with Nuoc Cham	Safe (Through to Top 6)
NSW	Will & Steve	Seared Miso Rainbow Trout with Crunchy Salad	Safe (Through to Top 6)
WA	Eva & Debra	Chargrilled Prawns with Pineapple Salad and Cucumber and Apple Pickle	Through to Sudden Death
WA	Kat & Andre	Peruvian Seared Tuna with Beans	Through to Sudden Death

==== Sudden Death Cook-Off 7 ====
- Episode 38
- Airdate — 14 April 2015
- Description — Eva & Debra take on Kat & Andre in a Sudden Death Cook-Off. The lower scoring team is eliminated and the other team proceeds to the Top 6 Finals Decider.

Sudden Death cook-off results
Team		Judge's scores						Total (out of 60)	Result
Team		Karen	Guy	Liz	Colin	Pete	Manu	Total (out of 60)	Result
WA	Eva & Debra	7	6	7	6	8	7	41	Safe
Dishes	Entree	Hot and Sour Prawn Soup							Safe
Dishes	Main	Singapore Chilli Crab							Safe
Dishes	Dessert	Five-Spice Panna Cotta with Poached Pear							Safe
WA	Kat & Andre	5	5	5	5	5	5	30	Eliminated
Dishes	Entree	Gnocchi with Pumpkin and Sage Burnt Butter							Eliminated
Dishes	Main	Pork and Mushroom Ragù with Polenta							Eliminated
Dishes	Dessert	White Chocolate Crème Brûlée with Baked Figs							Eliminated

=== Top 6: Finals Decider ===
In the Top 6 round, teams competed in a number of cook-offs held in Kitchen Headquarters. At the end of this round, five teams advance into the finals. This also sees the return of the Rapid cook-off and Showdown challenges, which have so far been omitted this season.

==== Kitchen Cook-Off ====
- Episode 39
- Airdate — 15 April 2015
- Description
  - Rapid Cook-off: Street Food — Teams were challenged to cook a street food dish in 30 minutes. The winner of this cook-off earned an advantage for the following Showdown challenge.
  - Showdown: Fine Dining — In the Showdown, teams were challenged to create a fine dining style dish. This was a head to head challenge, where one team faced off against another. The winner's advantage from the previous cook-off was the ability to set the match-ups between the teams. Three winners of the head to heads were safe and advance to the Top 5, while the bottom 3 head into an elimination knockout round.

Challenge summary
Rapid Cook-off: Street Food
Team		Dish	Result
NSW	Will & Steve	Twice Cooked Chicken Wings with Peach Chutney	Winner (Advantage)
VIC	Ash & Camilla	Beef Vermicelli Salad	Continue to Showdown
WA	Drasko & Bianca	Lamb Kofta with Pickled Cucumber, Flatbread and Mint Yoghurt	Continue to Showdown
WA	Eva & Debra	Jamaican Jerk Chicken with Rum Fruit Pickle	Continue to Showdown
QLD	Jac & Shaz	Fried Whitebait with Asian Salad	Continue to Showdown
VIC	Jane & Emma	Coconut Banana Fritter with Caramel Sauce	Continue to Showdown

Showdown: Fine Dining
Team			Dish	Result
1	NSW	Will & Steve	Venison Fillet with Smoked Leeks and Mushroom Sauce	Safe (Through to Top 5)
2	QLD	Jac & Shaz	Eye Fillet and Moreton Bay Bugs with Lemon Caper Sauce	Safe (Through to Top 5)
3	WA	Drasko & Bianca	Pearl Perch with Cauliflower Four Ways and Broad Beans	Safe (Through to Top 5)
1	WA	Eva & Debra	Crispy Skin Duck with Red Cabbage and Apple Sauce	Through to Knockout round
2	VIC	Jane & Emma	Confit Salmon with Orange and Fennel Salad	Through to Knockout round
3	VIC	Ash & Camilla	Barramundi with Potato Scales and Beurre Blanc	Through to Knockout round

==== Knock-Out Round ====
- Episode 40
- Airdate — 19 April 2015
- Description — The bottom three teams from the previous finals decider challenge face off against each other in a three-round knockout. In the first round, teams must neatly segment citrus fruits. The team who did the best job, earned an advantage for the second round. In round two, teams must cook a vegetarian dish in 45 minutes. The winner's advantage was the ability to select the main ingredient for each team to use. These included; mushrooms, cauliflower and okra. After this round, one team is safe as the other two compete in a final Sudden Death round, each creating their own 'signature dish', to determine the last team to join the Top 5 and another elimination.

Round 1: Skills Test
Task	Winner
Segmenting Citrus Fruits	Ash & Camilla

Round 2: Cook-off
Team		Dish	Result
VIC	Ash & Camilla	Braised Mushrooms with Ricotta Gnocchi	Safe
WA	Eva & Debra	Cauliflower Curry with Cauliflower Rice and Pakora	Through to Round 3 (Sudden Death)
VIC	Jane & Emma	Okra Fritters with Chilli Mayo and Asian Slaw	Through to Round 3 (Sudden Death)

Round 3: Sudden Death
Team		Judge's scores						Total (out of 60)	Result
Team		Karen	Guy	Liz	Colin	Pete	Manu	Total (out of 60)	Result
WA	Eva & Debra	8	9	8	8	9	9	51	Safe
Signature Dish		Braised Oxtail with Roasted Bone Marrow							Safe
VIC	Jane & Emma	7	8	7	7	8	8	45	Eliminated
Signature Dish		Spiced Sweet Potato Pie with Raspberry and Peach Sorbet							Eliminated

=== Top 5 ===
==== Ultimate Instant Restaurant ====
- Episodes 41 to 45
- Airdate — 20 to 27 April 2015
- Description — For the start of the finals round, the Top 5 teams head around the country once again in an Ultimate Instant Restaurant round. All teams have to cook two dishes of each course (entree, main and dessert) for their fellow finalists and judges for scoring. Guests have a choice of choosing one of the options per course while the judges Pete and Manu each taste one of the two options. The lowest scoring team is eliminated as the remaining four teams are ranked into the semifinals.

Colour key:
– Judge's score for course option 1
– Judge's score for course option 2

Instant restaurant summary
Top 5
Team and episode details			Guest scores					Pete's scores			Manu's scores			Total (out of 100)	Rank	Result
Team and episode details			D&B	E&D	W&S	J&S	A&C	Entrée	Main	Dessert	Entrée	Main	Dessert	Total (out of 100)	Rank	Result
WA	Drasko & Bianca		—	5	4	5	5	7	4	1	7	8	5	51	5th	Eliminated
Ep 41	20 April 2015		Wild Pastures													Eliminated
Dishes	Entrées	1	Bianca's Pho Bo with Homemade Rice Noodles													Eliminated
Dishes	Entrées	2	Seared Scallops with Chestnut Velouté													Eliminated
Dishes	Mains	1	Veal with Truffled Pine Nut Purée and Crispy Zucchini Flowers													Eliminated
Dishes	Mains	2	Tea-Smoked Quail with Mushroom Cream													Eliminated
Dishes	Desserts	1	First Date Lemon Tart													Eliminated
Dishes	Desserts	2	Chocolate Delice with Mandarin Caviar													Eliminated
WA	Eva & Debra		5	—	6	6	6	7	9	4	9	6	5	63	3rd	Through to Semi-Final
Ep 42	21 April 2015		Spice Market													Through to Semi-Final
Dishes	Entrées	1	Grilled Scampi with Sambal Beans													Through to Semi-Final
Dishes	Entrées	2	Chinese Braised Beef Ribs													Through to Semi-Final
Dishes	Mains	1	Red Duck Curry with Lychees													Through to Semi-Final
Dishes	Mains	2	Steamed Barramundi with Chilli, Spring Onion and Ginger													Through to Semi-Final
Dishes	Desserts	1	Singaporean Sugee Cake with Orange Jam													Through to Semi-Final
Dishes	Desserts	2	Pandan Ice-Cream with Coconut Jelly and Kaffir Lime Syrup													Through to Semi-Final
NSW	Will & Steve		7	7	—	7	7	9	10	9	9	10	4	79	1st	Through to Semi-Final
Ep 43	22 April 2015		The China Plate													Through to Semi-Final
Dishes	Entrées	1	Pigeon Salad with Caramelised Pears and Asparagus													Through to Semi-Final
Dishes	Entrées	2	Moreton Bay Bugs with Celeriac Remoulade and Seafood Bisque													Through to Semi-Final
Dishes	Mains	1	Lamb Backstrap with Pumpkin Hummus and Charred Brussels Sprouts													Through to Semi-Final
Dishes	Mains	2	Pork Belly with Apple, Fennel and Colcannon													Through to Semi-Final
Dishes	Desserts	1	Apple Tart with Rum Raisin Ice-Cream and Butterscotch Sauce													Through to Semi-Final
Dishes	Desserts	2	Almond Honeycomb Chocolate Bar													Through to Semi-Final
QLD	Jac & Shaz		6	6	6	—	6	8	8	4	7	9	5	65	2nd	Through to Semi-Final
Ep 44	26 April 2015		Stack													Through to Semi-Final
Dishes	Entrées	1	Fried Squid with Chilli Jam													Through to Semi-Final
Dishes	Entrées	2	Prawn and Leek Tart with Basil Pesto													Through to Semi-Final
Dishes	Mains	1	Sweet Potato and Walnut Chicken Roulade with White Wine Jus													Through to Semi-Final
Dishes	Mains	2	Macadamia Crusted Barramundi with Roasted Beetroot and Orange Salad													Through to Semi-Final
Dishes	Desserts	1	Poached Pears with Cinnamon Ice-Cream and Hazelnut Crumb													Through to Semi-Final
Dishes	Desserts	2	Cherry Short Stacks													Through to Semi-Final
VIC	Ash & Camilla		3	6	5	6	—	7	6	6	9	5	9	62	4th	Through to Semi-Final
Ep 45	27 April 2015		Dans La Maison													Through to Semi-Final
Dishes	Entrées	1	Asparagus Salad with 63 Degree Egg													Through to Semi-Final
Dishes	Entrées	2	Scallop Mousse with Lobster Sauce													Through to Semi-Final
Dishes	Mains	1	Coq Au Vin with Pasta													Through to Semi-Final
Dishes	Mains	2	Three Cheese Ravioli with Game Consommè													Through to Semi-Final
Dishes	Desserts	1	Gâteau aux Trois Laits													Through to Semi-Final
Dishes	Desserts	2	Millefeuille													Through to Semi-Final

=== Semi-finals ===
==== Semi-final 1 ====
- Episode 46
- Airdate — 28 April 2015
- Description — Ash & Camilla take on Will & Steve in the first Semi-Final Cook-Off. The lower scoring team is eliminated and the winner proceeds through to the Grand Final.

Semi-final cook-off results
Team		Judge's scores						Total (out of 60)	Result
Team		Karen	Guy	Liz	Colin	Pete	Manu	Total (out of 60)	Result
NSW	Will & Steve	8	8	8	8	8	8	48	Through to Grand Final
Dishes	Entree	Smoked Trout with Celery, Apple and Fennel							Through to Grand Final
Dishes	Main	Rib-Eye with Root Vegetable Galette and Port Jus							Through to Grand Final
Dishes	Dessert	Blackberry, Lime and Elderflower Tart							Through to Grand Final
VIC	Ash & Camilla	7	7	7	7	8	8	44	Eliminated
Dishes	Entree	Moreton Bay Bug with Artichoke Veloute							Eliminated
Dishes	Main	Veal Loin with Pumpkin Beurre Noisette Purée and Truffle Gnocchi							Eliminated
Dishes	Dessert	Rocky Road							Eliminated

==== Semi-final 2 ====
- Episode 47
- Airdate — 3 May 2015
- Description — Eva & Debra take on Jac & Shaz in the second Semi-Final Cook-Off. The lower scoring team is eliminated and the other team becomes the second team to proceed into the Grand Final.

Semi-final cook-off results
Team		Judge's scores						Total (out of 60)	Result
Team		Karen	Guy	Liz	Colin	Pete	Manu	Total (out of 60)	Result
QLD	Jac & Shaz	8	9	8	8	8	8	49	Through to Grand Final
Dishes	Entree	Chicken Livers with Port and Prosciutto							Through to Grand Final
Dishes	Main	Tea smoked Duck with Fennel Purée and Cranberry Sauce							Through to Grand Final
Dishes	Dessert	Lime and Coconut Sorbet with Pineapple and Meringue							Through to Grand Final
WA	Eva & Debra	7	8	8	7	7	7	44	Eliminated
Dishes	Entree	Crumbed Fish Cakes with Mango Chutney							Eliminated
Dishes	Main	Pork Vindaloo with Spiced Eggplant and Raita							Eliminated
Dishes	Dessert	Mango Pudding with Coconut Sago							Eliminated

=== Grand Final ===
- Episode 48
- Airdate — 4 May 2015
- Description — In the final cook-off for the series, the top 2 teams face-off in the ultimate Grand Final. Teams each cook a five course degustation in the format of a cold entree, hot entree, seafood main, meat main and dessert. 20 plates of each course, totalling 100 plates per team were served to all eliminated teams, friends and family. Guest judges returned for the final verdict of awarding the $250,000 prize to the winners. Teams also wear chef attire and have their Instant Restaurant represented.

Grand Final results
Team		Judge's scores						Total (out of 60)	Result
Team		Karen	Guy	Liz	Colin	Pete	Manu	Total (out of 60)	Result
NSW	Will & Steve	9	9	9	8	8	9	52	Winners
Dishes		The China Plate							Winners
1st course		Cured King Fish with Yellow Curry							Winners
2nd course		Quail with Corn and Jus							Winners
3rd course		Red Mullet with Jerusalem Artichoke and Basil							Winners
4th course		Confit Duck Leg with Honeyed Beetroot and Compressed Watermelon							Winners
5th course		Peaches and Cream							Winners
QLD	Jac & Shaz	8	9	8	8	9	8	50	Runners-up
Dishes		Stack							Runners-up
1st course		Prawns, Avocado and Pink Grapefruit							Runners-up
2nd course		Lamb with Feta, Beetroot and Rosemary Honey							Runners-up
3rd course		Confit Salmon with Roasted Fennel and Avocado Mousse							Runners-up
4th course		Beef Cheeks with Port and Celeriac Puree							Runners-up
5th course		Red Velvet with Chocolate and Raspberries							Runners-up

== Ratings ==
Colour key:
– Highest rating during the series
– Lowest rating during the series
– An elimination was held in this episode
– Finals week

Wk.	Episode		Air date	Viewers (in millions)	Nightly rank	Weekly average	Source
1	1	Instant Restaurant 1–1: Jac & Shaz	Monday, 2 February	1.596	#1	1.565	
1	2	Instant Restaurant 1–2: Kat & Andre	Tuesday, 3 February	1.401	#1	1.565	
1	3	Instant Restaurant 1–3: Robert & Lynzey	Wednesday, 4 February	1.697	#1	1.565	
2	4	Instant Restaurant 1–4: Ash & Camilla	Sunday, 8 February	1.685	#1	1.638	
2	5	Instant Restaurant 1–5: Annie & Lloyd	Monday, 9 February	1.656	#1	1.638	
2	6	Instant Restaurant 1–6: Gina & Anna	Tuesday, 10 February	1.725	#1	1.638	
2	7	Instant Restaurant 2–1: Sheri & Emilie	Wednesday, 11 February	1.632	#1	1.638	
2	8	Instant Restaurant 2–2: Eva & Debra	Thursday, 12 February	1.490	#1	1.638	
3	9	Instant Restaurant 2–3: Carol & Adam	Sunday, 15 February	1.514	#1	1.600	
3	10	Instant Restaurant 2–4: Matt & Rob	Monday, 16 February	1.688	#1	1.600	
3	11	Instant Restaurant 2–5: Rose & Josh	Tuesday, 17 February	1.715	#1	1.600	
3	12	Instant Restaurant 2–6: Vicky & Celine	Wednesday, 18 February	1.708	#1	1.600	
3	13	Instant Restaurant 3–1: Drasko & Bianca	Thursday, 19 February	1.373	#1	1.600	
4	14	Instant Restaurant 3–2: Rob & Dave	Monday, 23 February	1.624	#1	1.522	
4	15	Instant Restaurant 3–3: Lynn & Tony	Tuesday, 24 February	1.467	#1	1.522	
4	16	Instant Restaurant 3–4: Jane & Emma	Wednesday, 25 February	1.501	#1	1.522	
4	17	Instant Restaurant 3–5: Will & Steve	Thursday, 26 February	1.498	#1	1.522	
5	18	Instant Restaurant 3–6: Katie & Nikki	Monday, 2 March	1.649	#1	1.549	
5	19	Instant Restaurant 4–1: Annie & Lloyd	Tuesday, 3 March	1.602	#1	1.549	
5	20	Instant Restaurant 4–2: Sheri & Emilie	Wednesday, 4 March	1.513	#1	1.549	
5	21	Instant Restaurant 4–3: Jane & Emma	Thursday, 5 March	1.433	#1	1.549	
6	22	Instant Restaurant 4–4: Kat & Andre	Monday, 9 March	1.554	#1	1.585	
6	23	Instant Restaurant 4–5: Eva & Debra	Tuesday, 10 March	1.780	#1	1.585	
6	24	Instant Restaurant 4–6: Katie & Nikki	Wednesday, 11 March	1.575	#1	1.585	
6	25	People's Choice 1: Camping Challenge	Thursday, 12 March	1.433	#1	1.585	
7	26	Sudden Death Cook-Off 1	Monday, 16 March	1.756	#1	1.576	
7	27	People's Choice 2: Farmer's Challenge	Tuesday, 17 March	1.567	#1	1.576	
7	28	Sudden Death Cook-Off 2	Wednesday, 18 March	1.602	#1	1.576	
7	29	People's Choice 3: Pub Crawl	Thursday, 19 March	1.376	#1	1.576	
8	30	Sudden Death Cook-Off 3	Monday, 23 March	1.713	#1	1.590	
8	31	People's Choice 4: Wedding Challenge	Tuesday, 24 March	1.535	#1	1.590	
8	32	Sudden Death Cook-Off 4	Wednesday, 25 March	1.523	#1	1.590	
9	33	People's Choice 5: Garden Challenge	Monday, 6 April	1.441	#1	1.440	
9	34	Sudden Death Cook-Off 5	Tuesday, 7 April	1.416	#1	1.440	
9	35	People's Choice 6: Luna Park Challenge	Wednesday, 8 April	1.465	#1	1.440	
10	36	Sudden Death Cook-Off 6	Sunday, 12 April	1.279	#2	1.351	
10	37	People's Choice 7: Jetstar Challenge	Monday, 13 April	1.325	#1	1.351	
10	38	Sudden Death Cook-Off 7	Tuesday, 14 April	1.417	#1	1.351	
10	39	Finals Decider: Kitchen Cook-Off	Wednesday, 15 April	1.384	#1	1.351	
11	40	Finals Decider: Knock-Out Round	Sunday, 19 April	1.360	#2	1.457	
11	41	Ultimate Instant Restaurant 1: Drasko & Bianca	Monday, 20 April	1.491	#1	1.457	
11	42	Ultimate Instant Restaurant 2: Eva & Debra	Tuesday, 21 April	1.457	#1	1.457	
11	43	Ultimate Instant Restaurant 3: Will & Steve	Wednesday, 22 April	1.521	#1	1.457	
12	44	Ultimate Instant Restaurant 4: Jac and Shaz	Sunday, 26 April	1.417	#2	1.488	
12	45	Ultimate Instant Restaurant 5: Ash and Camilla	Monday, 27 April	1.552	#1	1.488	
12	46	Semi-Final 1	Tuesday, 28 April	1.495	#1	1.488	
13	47	Semi-Final 2	Sunday, 3 May	1.674	#1	1.931	
13	48	Grand Final	Monday, 4 May	2.082	#1	1.931	
13	48	Grand Final - Winner Announced	Monday, 4 May	2.039	#2	1.931	
