= Bolo =

Bolo may refer to:

== Arts and entertainment ==
=== Fictional entities ===
- Bolo, in the Bolo universe, the name of sentient supertanks
- An enemy in the Dick Tracy series
- Bolo, a character in the Shantae series
- Prince Bolo, a character in Haroun and the Sea of Stories
- Bolo, a fictional community in the novel bolo'bolo, a 1983 book by Hans Widmer

=== Video games ===
- Bolo (1982 video game), an Apple II tank game
- Bolo (1987 video game), a simulation of a tank battle
- Bolo (Breakout clone), an enhanced clone of the Breakout computer game for the Atari ST

=== Films ===
- Bolo (film), a 1979 Hong Kong film

== Military ==
- Bolo Airfield, a World War II airfield on Okinawa
- Douglas B-18 Bolo, a United States Army Air Corps bomber aircraft from the 1930s
- Operation Bolo, a United States military operation during the Vietnam War

== People ==
- Bolo (footballer) (born 1974), Spanish footballer
- Bolo (prince) (1613–1652), Manchu prince of the Qing Dynasty
- Bolo Pasha (born Paul Bolo, 1867–1918), French adventurer and German agent of the First World War
- Lashmer Whistler (1898–1963), British general of the Second World War nicknamed "Bolo" and "Private Bolo"
- Bolo Yeung (born 1946), Chinese actor and martial artist

== Places ==
- Bolo, Ethiopia, a village in Ethiopia
- Bolo River, a river in Romania
- Bolo, Tibet, a township
- Bolo Township, Washington County, Illinois, US
- Ogu/Bolo, a Local Government Area of Nigeria
- BOLO, Bos & Lommer, a neighbourhood of Amsterdam in the Netherlands

== Weapons ==
- Bolo knife, a Filipino knife similar to the machete
- Bolo Shell, a type of specialty shotgun shell
- Bolo, a variant of the Mauser C96 semi-automatic pistol

== Other uses ==
- BOLO, or "be on (the) lookout", an all-points bulletin in law enforcement
- Bolo (bread), commonly prepared by Tunisian, Libyan, and Italian Jews
- Bolo (tether), a type of spinning space tether
- Bolo bat, a child's toy
- Bolo punch, a wide sweeping lower cut used in martial arts
- Bolo snake or Fiji snake (Ogmodon vitianus), an extremely rare snake found only in Fiji
- Bolo tie, a decorative string tie
- Bolo, a derogatory term for Bolshevik
- Bolo, a cake in Portuguese cuisine
- Bolo language, a Bantu language of Angola

== See also ==
- Bola (disambiguation)
- Bolas, a throwing rope with weights at both ends to entangle prey
- Bollo (disambiguation)
- O Bolo, a municipality in Galicia, Spain
