= Bulu =

Bulu may refer to:

- Bulu (bread) (or Bolo), a sweet, round bread of Sephardi Jewish origin
- Bulu (Fijian mythology), the underworld in the mythology of Fiji
- A subgroup of the Beti-Pahuin people of Cameroon
  - Bulu language, spoken by the Bulu people of Cameroon
- Bulu, Zimbabwe, found in Matabeleland South, Zimbabwe
- Bulu, Rembang, on Indonesian National Route 1 in Central Java, Indonesia
- Bulu, Sukoharjo, part of Sukoharjo Regency in Central Java, Indonesia
- Bulu, Temanggung, on Indonesian National Route 9 in Central Java, Indonesia
- Tapu Bulu, a Pokémon species introduced in Pokémon Sun and Moon
- Barkat Ullah Bulu, a Bangladeshi politician.
