= Bola =

Bola may refer to:

== People ==
- Bola (name), a surname and given name
- Darrell Fitton, electronic musician from Manchester, England, AKA "Bola" and "Jello"
- Bola Tinubu, 16th president of Nigeria
- Bola Ige, Nigerian politician (1930–2001)

== Geography ==
- Bola (volcano), a volcano on the island of New Britain in Papua New Guinea
- Bola, Togo, village in Togo country
- Tatar spelling of Bula River
- Bolae, an ancient city of Latium, Italy

== Sports and games ==
- Bola bola, a gambling game similar to Three-card Monte
- Bola (video game), a 2010 Facebook game developed by Playdom
- Bola de Ouro, a Brazilian association football award
- Bola (tabloid), an Indonesian sports newspaper published from 1984 to 2018
- Rola bola, a plank on a cylinder on which a person balances

== Entertainment ==
- Bola Kampung, Malaysian children's animated TV series
- Bola Bola (miniseries), Philippine teen romantic comedy television miniseries

== Other uses ==
- Bolas, throwing weapon made of weights on the ends of an interconnected cord
- Bola tie, or "Bolo tie", a type of necktie consisting of a piece of cord fastened with an ornamental bar or clasp
- Bolan Pass, a mountain pass in Balochistan, Pakistan
- Cyclone Bola, a severe 1988 Pacific cyclone
- Bola language (Austronesian), an Oceanic language of West New Britain in Papua New Guinea
- Pela language (Bola language), a Burmish language of Western Yunnan, China
- Bolas spider, Group of spiders that capture prey with a bolas

== See also ==
- A Bola
- A Bola, Ourense, in Spain
- El Bola
- Battle of Los Angeles (disambiguation) (BOLA)
- Bolas (disambiguation)
- Bolla (disambiguation)
- Bolo (disambiguation)
