= Bolla (disambiguation) =

Bolla is a type of serpentic dragon in ancient Albanian folklore.

Bolla may also refer to:

- Bolla (name), given name and surname
- Bolla (butterfly), a genus of spread-winged skipper
- Bolla, Sierra de Gata, a summit of the Sierra de Gata range, Extremadura, Spain

== See also ==
- Bola (disambiguation)
