= Lha'gyai =

Coordinates: 30°40′N 98°21′E

Lha'gyai (ལྷ་རྒྱལ་, Chinese: 哈加乡 Hajia) is a township in Gonjo County, Tibet Autonomous Region of China.

== See also ==
- List of towns and villages in Tibet
