= Ash Pollard =

Australian cook and television personality

- Born: Ashley Pollard; 1986 (age 39–40); Tasmania
- Occupations: Cook, author, radio and television presenter
- Years active: 2015–present
- Agent: Bravo Management
- Television: My Kitchen Rules; Dancing with the Stars; I'm a Celebrity...Get Me Out of Here!
- Partner: Peter Ferne
- Children: 2
- Website: Ash Pollard

Ashley Pollard (born 1986) is an Australian cook, author, television and radio personality who came to public attention when she appeared on reality cooking show My Kitchen Rules in 2015.

== Early life and education ==
Pollard describes her childhood as "privileged". She grew up on the Gold Coast, where she attended All Saints Anglican School, graduating in 2003. She also attended Paradise Performers, a dance school based on the Gold Coast, all throughout her childhood until she was in grade 11.

She then studied and graduated from the Actors Centre Australia in 2008. She subsequently worked in event management.

== Career ==
Pollard first appeared on the 2015 season of My Kitchen Rules where she and her cooking partner, Camilla Counsel, finished fourth. They were introduced as "Melbourne socialites".

In 2015, Pollard appeared on Dancing with the Stars where she and her dance partner finished third.

She has also worked with Channel 7's website, Yahoo7 Be, presenting videos of various recipes. In late July 2017, she began writing 12 weekly blogs for Yahoo7 Be, sharing advice on how to deal with life's trickiest situations, everything from job interviews, to dealing with an ex.

Pollard appeared in the 2017 season of I'm a Celebrity...Get Me Out of Here!. Her nominated charity was Beyond Blue. She stated she chose this charity because her mother's brother committed suicide. She was evicted on 7 March 2017, after lasting 40 days in camp and finishing in seventh place.

Pollard was a regular guest host on 2GB radio show, Nights with Steve Price, which she began in April 2017. Her segment with Price was called "Thursday Food with Ash Pollard", and she and Price spend each Thursday discussing cooking tips and all things food related. She finished this role in December that year.

Pollard released her first e-book on 9 July 2017, a cookbook entitled Eat Me, which she describes as a compilation of her go-to recipes at home.

In December 2017, it was announced that Pollard would be relocating to the Central Coast, NSW to join Sea FM for breakfast radio alongside Daniel Gawned. She began this role on 22 January 2018. Their show runs 5am-9am on weekdays.

In 2023, Pollard competed in the second series of The Traitors and was chosen as a Traitor. However, she was banished by her fellow competitors and was eliminated in the third episode.

== Personal life ==
Pollard has misophonia (selective sound sensitivity syndrome). She fosters animals, especially dogs, through the RSPCA.
