= Bollo (disambiguation) =

Bollo is a bun made from corn, yuca or potato.

Bollo may also refer to:

- Bollo, a character from The Mighty Boosh television series
- Boli, Ivory Coast, a town in Ivory Coast, also known as Bollo
- Marca da bollo, an Italian revenue stamp
- Bollo Lane, a street in Acton, London

== See also ==
- Bolo (disambiguation)
