= Bolas (disambiguation) =

Bolas is a throwing weapon made of weights on the ends of interconnected cord.

Bolas may also refer to:

== People with the name ==
- Mark Bolas, a virtual reality researcher
- Niko Bolas, an American music producer

== Other uses ==
- Bolas (horse)
- Bolas spider, a spider in which the adult females catch prey using a sticky drop on a line, resembling a bolas
- Nicol Bolas, a fictional planeswalker in Magic: the Gathering
- BOLAS (spacecraft), a proposed lunar orbiter

== See also ==
- Bola (disambiguation)
- Bolo ball
- Bolo bat
- Bolus (disambiguation)
