= Bola Ikulayo =

Nigerian professor of sport psychology (1948–2016)

Professor Bola Ikulayo
- Born: 2 June 1948; Ikoro-Ekiti, Southern Region, British Nigeria (now in Ekiti State, Nigeria)
- Died: 24 March 2016 (aged 67); Lagos State, Nigeria
- Occupations: Academic; sport psychologist

Bola Philomena Ikulayo (2 June 1948 – 24 March 2016) was the first Nigerian female professor of sport psychology and the founder of Sport Psychology of the Association of Nigeria (SPAN).

== Early life ==
Bola Ikulayo was born on 2 June 1948 in Ikoro-Ekiti, then Southern Region.

== Career ==
She began working as a teacher in 1967 at St. Benedict Catholic Primary School in Igede, Ekiti State.
