= Dancing with the Stars (Australian TV series) season 15 =

Dancing with the Stars
- Season 15
- Hosted by: Shane Bourne; Edwina Bartholomew
- Judges: Kym Johnson; Todd McKenney; Helen Richey
- Celebrity winner: Emma Freedman
- Professional winner: Aric Yegudkin
- No. of episodes: 9

Release
- Original network: Seven Network
- Original release: 19 July – 7 September 2015

Season chronology
- ← Previous; Season 14 Next → Season 16

The fifteenth season of the Australian Dancing with the Stars premiered on the Seven Network on 19 July 2015. It was the only season to be hosted by Shane Bourne, following the decision of former host Daniel MacPherson to not return. Edwina Bartholomew returned as co-host. Kym Johnson, Todd McKenney, and Helen Richey returned as judges,. while Adam Garcia did not return due to his wife's pregnancy. Bruno Tonioli appeared as a guest judge during the first three weeks of the competition.

On 7 September 2015, television and radio presenter Emma Freedman and Aric Yegudkin were announced as the winners, while Olympic diver Matthew Mitcham and Masha Belash finished in second place, and cook Ash Pollard and Jarryd Byrne finished in third.

== Couples ==
This season featured eleven celebrities. The entire cast was leaked on 19 June 2015.

Celebrity	Notability	Professional partner	Status
John Paul Young	Singer	Giselle Peacock	Eliminated 1st on 26 July 2015
Tim Robards	The Bachelor Australia star	Camille Webb; Giselle Peacock (Week 3)	Eliminated 2nd on 2 August 2015
Samantha Harris	Model	Joshua Keefe	Eliminated 3rd on 9 August 2015
Lynette Bolton	Businesswoman	Carmelo Pizzino	Eliminated 4th on 9 August 2015
Jude Bolton	AFL player	Dianne Buswell	Eliminated 5th on 16 August 2015
Kelly Cartwright	Paralympic athlete	Damian Whitewood	Eliminated 6th on 23 August 2015
Larry Emdur	Television personality	Alana Patience	Eliminated 7th on 30 August 2015
Mat Rogers	NRL player	Ash-Leigh Hunter	Eliminated 8th on 6 September 2015
Ash Pollard	Cook & television personality	Jarryd Byrne	Third place on 7 September 2015
Matthew Mitcham	Olympic diver	Masha Belash	Runners-up on 7 September 2015
Emma Freedman	Television & radio presenter	Aric Yegudkin	Winners on 7 September 2015

== Scoring chart ==
The highest score each week is indicated in bold green with a dagger (†), while the lowest score each week is indicated in italicized red with a double-dagger (‡).

Color key:

Winners
Runners-up
Third place
Bottom two or three
Eliminated

Dancing with the Stars (season 15) - Weekly scores
Couple	Pl.	Week									
Couple	Pl.	1 (Note: The couples were scored on a 40-point scale due to the presence of a guest judge.)	2	1+2	3	4	5	6	7	8	
Couple	Pl.	1	2	1+2	3	4	5	6	7	Night 1	Night 2
Emma & Aric	1st	31	35	66	**38**†	27	27	27+26=53	29+30=**59**†	28+30=58	+30+30=**118**† (Note: This couple finished in first place.)
Matthew & Masha	2nd	**33**†	32	65	37	25	24+3=27	25+27=52 (Note: This couple was in the bottom two or three, but was not eliminated.)	25+27=52	29+30=**59**†	+29+28=116‡ (Note: This couple finished in second place.)
Ash & Jarryd	3rd	32	**36**†	**68**†	36	21	21	30+26=**56**†	26+27=53	25+27=52	+29=81‡ (Note: This couple finished in third place.)
Mat & Ash-Leigh	4th	28	31	59	33	**29**†	19+3=22	29+27=**56**†	21+26=47	24+26=50‡ (Note: This couple was eliminated.)	
Larry & Alana	5th	28	23‡	51	32	21	26+3=**29**†	24+27=51	21+20=41‡		
Kelly & Damian	6th	26	32	58	31	23	16‡	22+26=48‡			
Jude & Dianne	7th	21‡	32	53	28	23	18				
Lynette & Carmelo	8th	21‡	27	48	27	18‡					
Samantha & Josh	9th	24	27	51	25	19					
Tim & Camille	10th	28	25	53	22‡						
John Paul & Giselle	11th	23	24	47‡							

== Weekly scores ==
Unless indicated otherwise, individual judges scores in the charts below (given in parentheses) are listed in this order from left to right: Todd McKenney, Helen Richey, Kym Johnson.

=== Week 1 ===
Individual judges scores in the charts below (given in parentheses) are listed in this order from left to right: Todd McKenney, Helen Richey, Kym Johnson, Bruno Tonioli.

Couples are listed in the order they performed.

Couple	Scores	Dance	Music
Ash & Jarryd	32 (8, 8, 8, 8)	Jive	"Dear Future Husband" — Meghan Trainor
Tim & Camille	28 (7, 7, 7, 7)	Viennese waltz	"Have You Ever Really Loved a Woman?" — Bryan Adams
Samantha & Josh	24 (6, 6, 6, 6)	Viennese waltz	"You Don't Own Me" — Lesley Gore
Jude & Dianne	21 (5, 5, 6, 5)	Cha-cha-cha	"Uptown Funk" — Mark Ronson, feat. Bruno Mars
Lynette & Carmelo	21 (4, 5, 6, 6)	Cha-cha-cha	"Mercy" — Duffy
Mat & Ash-Leigh	28 (7, 7, 7, 7)	Tango	"Original Sin" — INXS
Matthew & Masha	33 (9, 8, 8, 8)	Cha-cha-cha	"Can You Feel It" — The Jacksons
Kelly & Damian	26 (6, 6, 7, 7)	Contemporary	"Let It Go" — James Bay
John & Giselle	23 (5, 6, 6, 6)	Foxtrot	"It Had to Be You" — Harry Connick, Jr.
Emma & Aric	31 (7, 8, 8, 8)	Viennese waltz	"Que Sera, Sera (Whatever Will Be, Will Be)" — Doris Day
Larry & Alana	28 (7, 7, 7, 7)	Cha-cha-cha	"A Little Less Conversation" — Elvis Presley

=== Week 2 ===
Individual judges scores in the charts below (given in parentheses) are listed in this order from left to right: Todd McKenney, Helen Richey, Kym Johnson, Bruno Tonioli.

Couples are listed in the order they performed.

Couple	Scores	Dance	Music	Result
John & Giselle	24 (6, 6, 6, 6)	Samba	"Love Is in the Air" — John Paul Young	Eliminated
Samantha & Joshua	27 (6, 7, 7, 7)	Contemporary	"Diamonds" — Rihanna	Bottom two
Matthew & Masha	32 (8, 8, 8, 8)	Salsa	"Spice Up Your Life" — Spice Girls	Safe
Tim & Camille	25 (6, 6, 6, 7)	Rumba	"The Blower's Daughter" — Damien Rice	Safe
Jude & Dianne	32 (8, 8, 8, 8)	Paso doble	"Best of You" — Foo Fighters	Safe
Lynette & Carmelo	27 (6, 7, 7, 7)	Waltz	"Kissing You" — Des'ree	Safe
Ash & Jarryd	36 (9, 9, 9, 9)	Samba	"Crazy in Love" — Beyoncé	Safe
Mat & Ash-Leigh	31 (8, 8, 8, 7)	Contemporary	"Brothers in Arms" — Dire Straits	Safe
Kelly & Damian	32 (8, 8, 8, 8)	Waltz	"Come Away with Me" — Norah Jones	Safe
Larry & Alana	23 (5, 6, 6, 6)	Jive	"Wake Me Up Before You Go-Go" — Wham!	Safe
Emma & Aric	35 (8, 9, 9, 9)	Rumba	"Burn" — Tina Arena	Safe

=== Week 3 ===
Individual judges scores in the charts below (given in parentheses) are listed in this order from left to right: Todd McKenney, Helen Richey, Kym Johnson, Bruno Tonioli.

Giselle Peacock performed with Tim Robards after Camille Webb became injured during rehearsal.

Couples are listed in the order they performed.

Couple	Scores	Dance	Music	Result
Tim & Giselle	22 (4, 6, 6, 6)	Samba	"I Go to Rio" — Peter Allen	Eliminated
Matthew & Masha	37 (9, 10, 9, 9)	Foxtrot	"The Girl from Ipanema" — Nat King Cole	Safe
Samantha & Joshua	25 (5, 6, 7, 7)	Cha-cha-cha	"On the Floor" — Jennifer Lopez, feat. Pitbull	Safe
Larry & Alana	32 (8, 8, 8, 8)	Tango	"La Cumparsita" — Gerardo Matos Rodriguez	Safe
Jude & Dianne	28 (7, 7, 7, 7)	Samba	"Magalenha" — Sergio Mendes	Safe
Lynette & Carmelo	27 (6, 7, 7, 7)	Rumba	"Hero" — Enrique Iglesias	Safe
Ash & Jarryd	36 (9, 9, 9, 9)	Argentine tango	"Santa Maria" — Gotan Project	Safe
Kelly & Damian	31 (8, 7, 8, 8)	Salsa	"Hips Don't Lie" — Shakira, feat. Wyclef Jean	Safe
Mat & Ash-Leigh	33 (9, 8, 8, 8)	Rumba	"Maria Maria" — Santana, feat. The Product G&B	Bottom two
Emma & Aric	38 (10, 9, 9, 10)	Salsa	"You'll Be Mine (Party Time)" — Gloria Estefan	Safe

=== Week 4 ===
Couples are listed in the order they performed.

Couple	Scores	Dance	Music	Result
Emma & Aric	27 (9, 9, 9)	Cha-cha-cha	"Get Stupid" — Aston Merrygold	Safe
Mat & Ash-Leigh	29 (9, 10, 10)	Foxtrot	"Mack the Knife" — Robbie Williams	Safe
Samantha & Joshua	19 (6, 6, 7)	Tango	"Missionary Man" — Eurythmics	Eliminated
Matthew & Masha	25 (9, 7, 9)	Viennese waltz	"Can't Help Falling in Love" — Elvis Presley	Safe
Larry & Alana	21 (7, 7, 7)	Paso doble	"Black Betty" — Ram Jam	Bottom three
Lynette & Carmelo	18 (6, 6, 6)	Foxtrot	"Ghost" — Ella Henderson	Eliminated
Jude & Dianne	23 (7, 8, 8)	Tango	"Geronimo" — Sheppard	Safe
Kelly & Damian	23 (7, 7, 9)	Quickstep	"Bad Romance" — Ariana Savalas	Safe
Ash & Jarryd	21 (5, 7, 9)	Viennese waltz	"Like I'm Gonna Lose You" — Meghan Trainor, feat. John Legend	Safe

=== Week 5 ===
Couples are listed in the order they performed.

Couple	Scores	Dance	Music	Result
Matthew & Masha	24 (8, 7, 9)	Jive	"Don't Stop Me Now" — Queen	Safe
Jude & Dianne	18 (6, 6, 6)	Viennese waltz	"Powerful" — Major Lazer, feat. Ellie Goulding & Tarrus Riley	Eliminated
Mat & Ash-Leigh	19 (7, 5, 7)	Cha-cha-cha	"Dancing in the Street" — David Bowie & Mick Jagger	Safe
Larry & Alana	26 (9, 9, 8)	Viennese waltz	"Kiss from a Rose" — Seal	Safe
Kelly & Damian	16 (5, 5, 6)	Cha-cha-cha	"Black Magic" — Little Mix	Bottom two
Ash & Jarryd	21 (7, 7, 7)	Salsa	"Wanna Be Startin' Somethin'" — Michael Jackson	Safe
Emma & Aric	27 (9, 9, 9)	Tango	"Blame" — Calvin Harris, feat. John Newman	Immunity

For each dance-off, the couple with the highest remaining score (the first team listed) picked the opponent against whom they wanted to dance; the chosen opponent was allowed to pick the dance style (from cha-cha-cha, foxtrot and salsa). The winner of each dance-off earned three points. The winning immunity couple were Emma & Aric, who didn’t have to participate in the dance-off.

Couple	Dance	Music	Result
Larry & Alana	Cha-cha-cha	”Shut Up and Dance” — Walk the Moon	Winners
Jude & Dianne	Cha-cha-cha	”Shut Up and Dance” — Walk the Moon	Losers
Matthew & Masha	Foxtrot	”Ain't That a Kick in the Head?” — Dean Martin	Winners
Kelly & Damian	Foxtrot	”Ain't That a Kick in the Head?” — Dean Martin	Losers
Mat & Ash-Leigh	Salsa	"Crazy Stupid Love” — Cheryl Cole, feat. Tinie Tempah	Winners
Ash & Jarryd	Salsa	"Crazy Stupid Love” — Cheryl Cole, feat. Tinie Tempah	Losers

=== Week 6 ===
Couples are listed in the order they performed.

Couple	Scores	Dance	Music	Result
Emma & Aric	27 (9, 9, 9)	Jive	"Lips Are Movin'" — Meghan Trainor	Safe
Larry & Alana	24 (8, 8, 8)	Foxtrot	"Fly Me to the Moon" — Frank Sinatra	Safe
Kelly & Damian	22 (7, 7, 8)	Tango	"Sweet Dreams" — Eurythmics	Eliminated
Mat & Ash-Leigh	29 (10, 9, 10)	Viennese waltz	"Give Me Love" — Ed Sheeran	Safe
Matthew & Masha	25 (9, 7, 9)	Paso doble	"Sweet Disposition" — The Temper Trap	Bottom two
Ash & Jarryd	30 (10, 10, 10)	Contemporary	"Unconditionally" — Katy Perry	Safe
Ash & Jarryd Kelly & Damian Emma & Aric	26 (9, 8, 9)	Team Dance	"Bills" — LunchMoney Lewis	
Larry & Alana Mat & Ash-Leigh Matthew & Masha	27 (9, 9, 9)	Team Dance	"Trouble" — Iggy Azalea, feat. Jennifer Hudson	

=== Week 7 ===
Couples are listed in the order they performed.

Couple	Scores	Dance	Music	Result
Mat & Ash-Leigh	21 (7, 7, 7)	Paso doble & Tango	"Pompeii" — Bastille	Bottom two
Mat & Ash-Leigh	26 (9, 9, 8)	Quickstep	"My Generation" — The Who	Bottom two
Matthew & Masha	25 (8, 8, 9)	Cha-cha-cha & Tango	"Ghost Town" — Adam Lambert	Safe
Matthew & Masha	27 (8, 9, 10)	Waltz	"Mr. Bojangles" — Nitty Gritty Dirt Band	Safe
Larry & Alana	21 (7, 7, 7)	Paso doble & Tango	"Born to Run" — Bruce Springsteen	Eliminated
Larry & Alana	20 (7, 6, 7)	Quickstep	"Mr. Pinstripe Suit" — Big Bad Voodoo Daddy	Eliminated
Emma & Aric	29 (10, 9, 10)	Jazz & Jive	"Too Darn Hot" — Ella Fitzgerald	Safe
Emma & Aric	30 (10, 10, 10)	Argentine tango	"Libertango" — Bond	Safe
Ash & Jarryd	26 (8, 9, 9)	Contemporary & Foxtrot	"Lay Me Down" — Sam Smith	Safe
Ash & Jarryd	27 (9, 9, 9)	Quickstep	"It Don't Mean a Thing (If It Ain't Got That Swing)" — Duke Ellington	Safe

=== Week 8: Grand Final ===
==== Night 1 ====
Couples are listed in the order they performed.

Couple	Scores	Dance	Music	Result
Matthew & Masha	29 (10, 9, 10)	Samba	"Hip Hip Chin Chin" — Club des Belugas	Safe
Matthew & Masha	30 (10, 10, 10)	Contemporary	"I'm Not the Only One" — Sam Smith	Safe
Mat & Ash-Leigh	24 (8, 8, 8)	Jive	"What I Like About You" — The Romantics	Eliminated
Mat & Ash-Leigh	26 (9, 8, 9)	Paso doble	"(I Can't Get No) Satisfaction" — The Rolling Stones	Eliminated
Ash & Jarryd	25 (8, 8, 9)	Jazz	"Baby Did a Bad Bad Thing" — Chris Isaak	Bottom two
Ash & Jarryd	27 (9, 9, 9)	Cha-cha-cha	"Groove Is in the Heart" — Deee-Lite	Bottom two
Emma & Aric	28 (10, 9, 9)	Foxtrot	"She" — Charles Aznavour	Safe
Emma & Aric	30 (10, 10, 10)	Paso doble	"Run Boy Run" — Woodkid	Safe

==== Night 2 ====
Couples are listed in the order they performed.

Couple	Order	Scores	Dance	Music	Result
Emma & Aric	1	30 (10, 10, 10)	Jive	"Lips Are Movin'" — Meghan Trainor	Winners
Emma & Aric	4	30 (10, 10, 10)	Freestyle	"Singin' in the Rain" — Gene Kelly	Winners
Ash & Jarryd	2	29 (10, 9, 10)	Argentine tango	"Santa Maria" — Gotan Project	Third place
Matthew & Masha	3	29 (9, 10, 10)	Cha-cha-cha	"Can You Feel It" — The Jacksons	Runners-up
Matthew & Masha	5	28 (9, 10, 9)	Freestyle	"Valerie" — Mark Ronson, feat. Amy Winehouse	Runners-up

== Dance chart ==
The celebrities and professional partners danced one of these routines for each corresponding week:

- Week 1: One unlearned dance
- Week 2: One unlearned dance
- Week 3: One unlearned dance
- Week 4: One unlearned dance
- Week 5: One unlearned dance & dance-off
- Week 6: One unlearned dance & team dance
- Week 7: Fusion dance & one unlearned dance
- Week 8 (Night 1): Two unlearned dances
- Week 8 (Night 2): Judges' choice & freestyle

Dancing with the Stars (season 15) - Dance chart
Couple	Week													
Couple	1	2	3	4	5		6		7		8			
Emma & Aric	Viennese waltz	Rumba	Salsa	Cha-cha-cha	Tango	Immunity	Jive	Team; Dance	Jazz & Jive	Argentine tango	Foxtrot	Paso doble	Jive	Freestyle
Matthew & Masha	Cha-cha-cha	Salsa	Foxtrot	Viennese waltz	Jive	Foxtrot	Paso doble	Team; Dance	Cha-cha-cha & Tango	Waltz	Samba	Contemp.	Cha-cha-cha	Freestyle
Ash & Jarryd	Jive	Samba	Argentine tango	Viennese waltz	Salsa	Salsa	Contemp.	Team; Dance	Contemp. & Foxtrot	Quickstep	Jazz	Cha-cha-cha	Argentine tango	
Mat & Ash-Leigh	Tango	Contemp.	Rumba	Foxtrot	Cha-cha-cha	Salsa	Viennese waltz	Team; Dance	Paso doble & Tango	Quickstep	Jive	Paso doble		
Larry & Alana	Cha-cha-cha	Jive	Tango	Paso doble	Viennese waltz	Cha-cha-cha	Foxtrot	Team; Dance	Paso doble & Tango	Quickstep				
Kelly & Damian	Contemp.	Waltz	Salsa	Quickstep	Cha-cha-cha	Foxtrot	Tango	Team; Dance						
Jude & Dianne	Cha-cha-cha	Paso doble	Samba	Tango	Viennese waltz	Cha-cha-cha								
Lynette & Carmelo	Cha-cha-cha	Waltz	Rumba	Foxtrot										
Samantha & Josh	Viennese waltz	Contemp.	Cha-cha-cha	Tango										
Tim & Camille	Viennese waltz	Rumba	Samba											
John & Giselle	Foxtrot	Samba												

== Ratings ==
Episode		Original airdate	Timeslot	Viewers (in millions)	Rank (Night)	Source
1	Week 1	19 July 2015	Sunday 7:00 pm	0.778	#6	
2	Week 2	26 July 2015	Sunday 8:00 pm	0.710	#9	
3	Week 3	2 August 2015	Sunday 8:00 pm	0.707	#7	
4	Week 4	9 August 2015	Sunday 8:00 pm	0.673	#8	
5	Week 5	16 August 2015	Sunday 8:00 pm	0.736	#8	
6	Week 6	23 August 2015	Sunday 8:00 pm	0.727	#8	
7	Week 7	30 August 2015	Sunday 8:00 pm	0.671	#10	
8	Week 8	6 September 2015	Sunday 8:00 pm	0.867	#6	
9	Week 8	7 September 2015	Monday 7:30 pm	0.883	#8	
