= Gonjo County =

Gonjo County 贡觉县 • གོ་འཇོ་རྫོང་།
- County
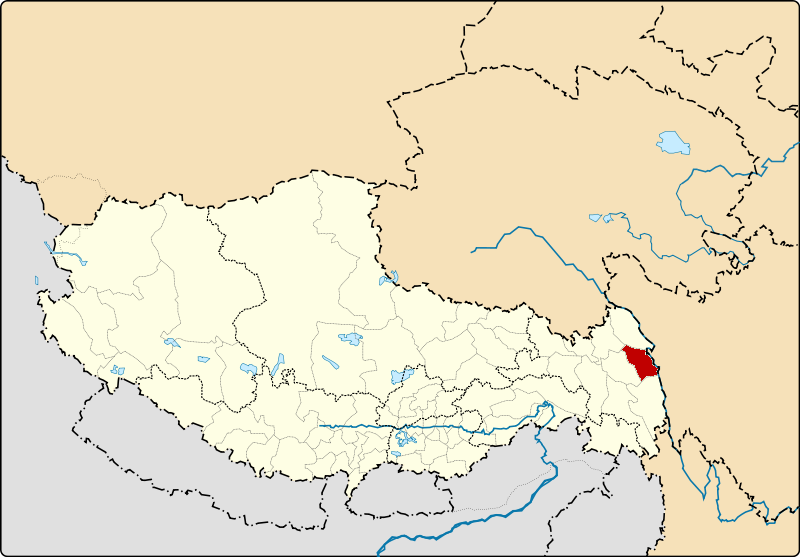
- Location of Gonjo County within Tibet Autonomous Region

- Location of the seat in the Tibet AR Gonjo (China)
- Coordinates: 30°51′37″N 98°16′21″E
- Country: China
- Autonomous region: Tibet
- Prefecture-level city: Chamdo
- County seat: Bolo

Area
  - Total: 6,322.55 km^{2} (2,441.15 sq mi)

Population (2020)
  - Total: 40,009
  - Density: 6.3280/km^{2} (16.389/sq mi)
- Time zone: UTC+8 (China Standard)
- Website: gongjue.changdu.gov.cn

Gonjo County

Chinese name
- Simplified Chinese: 贡觉县
- Traditional Chinese: 貢覺縣
Transcriptions
Standard Mandarin
- Hanyu Pinyin: Gòngjué Xiàn

Tibetan name
- Tibetan: གོ་འཇོ་རྫོང་།
Transcriptions
- Wylie: go 'jo rdzong
- Tibetan Pinyin: Gonjo Zong

Gonjo County (Tibetan: གོ་འཇོ་རྫོང་; Chinese: 贡觉县) is a county of the Chamdo Prefecture in the east of the Tibet Autonomous Region, China, bordering Sichuan province to the east.

== Administrative divisions ==
Gonjo County is divided in 1 town and 11 townships.

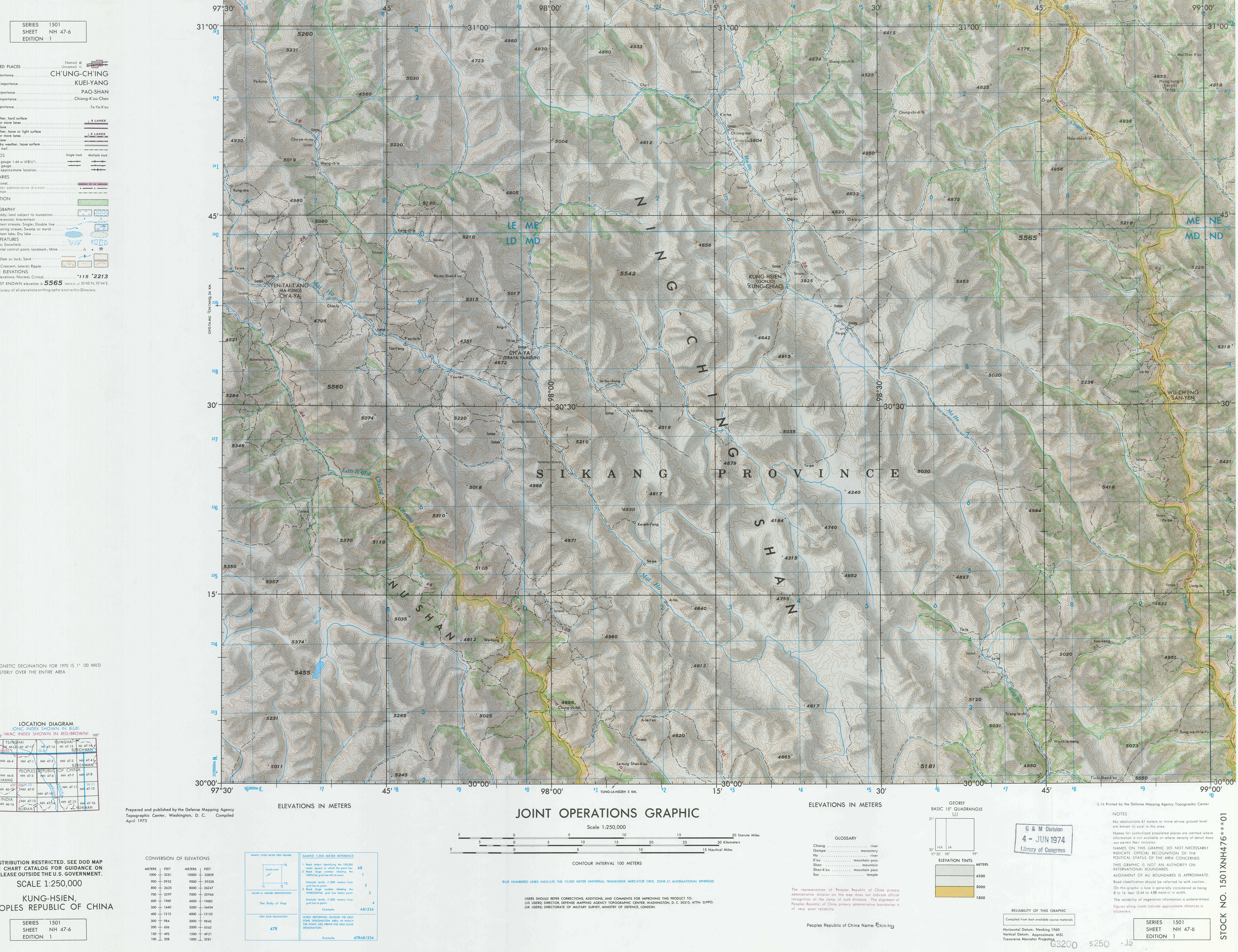

Name	Chinese	Hanyu Pinyin	Tibetan	Wylie
Town
Bolo Town	莫洛镇	Mòluò zhèn	འབོ་ལོ་གྲོང་རྡལ།	'bo lo grong rdal
Townships
Gyanbê Township	相皮乡	Xiàngpí xiāng	སྐྱ་འབེལ་ཤང་།	skya 'bel shang
Lha'gyai Township	哈加乡	Hājiā xiāng	ལྷ་རྒྱལ་ཤང་།	lha rgyal shang
Qangsum Township	雄松乡	Xióngsōng xiāng	བྱང་གསུམ་ཤང་།	byang gsum shang
Lhato Township	拉妥乡	Lātuǒ xiāng	ལྷ་ཐོ་ཤང་།	lha tho shang
Awang Township	阿旺乡	Āwàng xiāng	ཨ་དབང་ཤང་།	a dbang shang
Bumgyê Township	木协乡	Mùxié xiāng	འབུམ་སྐྱེས་ཤང་།	'bum skyes shang
Langmai Township	罗麦乡	Luómài xiāng	གླང་སྨད་ཤང་།	glang smad shang
Sêrdong Township	沙东乡	Shādōng xiāng	གསེར་གདོང་ཤང་།	gser gdong shang
Kêrri Township	克日乡	Kèrì xiāng	ཁེར་རི་ཤང་།	kher ri shang
Zêba Township	则巴乡	Zébā xiāng	རྩེ་བ་ཤང་།	rtse ba shang
Mindo Township	敏都乡	Mǐndū xiāng	མིག་མདོ་ཤང་།	mig mdo shang
