= Bolo, Gonjo County =

Bolo
- Town
- 莫洛镇
- Location in the Tibet Autonomous Region
- Coordinates: 30°51′24″N 98°16′26″E
- Country: China
- Province-level division: Tibet Autonomous Region
- Prefecture: Qamdo Prefecture
- County: Gonjo County
- Elevation: 3,619 m (11,873 ft)
- Time zone: UTC+8 (China Standard)
- Postal code: 542123
- Area code: 0895

Bolo (Chinese: 莫洛; pinyin: Mōluò) is a town in and the seat of Gonjo County, eastern Tibet Autonomous Region, Western China.
