= Bolo, Ethiopia =

- Location within Ethiopia
- Coordinates: 8°50′N 39°22′E
- Country: Ethiopia
- Region: Amhara
- Zone: Semien Shewa Zone

Population (2005)
  - Total: 1,157
- Time zone: UTC+3 (EAT)
- Climate: Cwb

Bolo (Amharic "valley, trench") is a town in central Ethiopia. Located in the Semien Shewa Zone of the Amhara Region, it has a latitude and longitude of 8°50′N 39°22′E with an elevation of 1891 meters above sea level.

== Overview ==
The market in Bolo was important for coffee in the 19th century. In 1961–62, the market was held on Tuesdays.

Based on figures from the Central Statistical Agency (Ethiopia), Bolo has an estimated total population of 1,157 of whom 579 are men and 578 women. The 1994 national census reported this town had a total population of 647 of whom 314 were men and 333 were women.
