= Bola Odeleke =

Nigerian pastor (born 1950)

- Born: 1950 (age 75–76); Oyo State, Nigeria
- Citizenship: Nigeria
- Occupation: Evangelist
- Years active: 1977–present

Bola Odeleke (born 1950) is a Nigerian pastor, evangelist, preacher, founder and general overseer of Power Pentecostal Church.

== Early life ==
Odeleke is from Ibadan, the capital of Oyo State, southwestern Nigeria. She had her primary and secondary education at Ilesa, her mother's hometown. She became a Christian in 1970 but began her evangelism in November 1974, celebrating her 40th anniversary in the ministry in August 2014. She became a bishop on 28 May 1995, and was the first African woman to become a bishop.
