= Theresa Anyuat Bola =

South Sudanese politician

Theresa Anyuat Bola is a South Sudanese politician. She has served as Minister of Social Development of Western Bahr el Ghazal since 18 May 2010.
