= Frank Bolus =

English cricketer

Personal information
- Full name: Frank Bolus
- Born: 2 November 1864; Wolverhampton, Staffordshire, England
- Died: 15 September 1939 (aged 74); Coventry, Warwickshire, England
- Batting: Right-handed

Domestic team information
- Years: Team
- 1893–1894: Somerset
- First-class debut: 15 June 1893 Somerset v Yorkshire
- Last First-class: 23 July 1894 Somerset v Lancashire

Career statistics
Competition	First-class
Matches	10
Runs scored	111
Batting average	7.40
100s/50s	0/0
Top score	23
Balls bowled	15
Wickets	0
Bowling average	–
5 wickets in innings	0
10 wickets in match	0
Best bowling	0/2
Catches/stumpings	5/–
- Source: CricketArchive, 12 June 2014

Frank Bolus (2 November 1864 – 15 September 1939) played first-class cricket for Somerset in 10 matches in the 1893 and 1894 seasons. He was born at Wolverhampton and died at Coventry.

Bolus was used by Somerset as a lower-order right-handed batsman, and bowled only three overs in his 10 games for the county, although he took a wicket in a non-first-class match for Somerset against the 1894 South Africans played after his last first-class match for the team. A surviving scorecard from a club match involving Frome Cricket Club suggests that at club cricket level he was regarded as an all-rounder. For Somerset, he made innings of 16 and 23 in his first game against Yorkshire. But the 23 remained his highest first-class score, although he was given seven matches in 1893 and three more in 1894, and his career batting average was only seven runs per innings.
