= Battle of Los Angeles (disambiguation) =

The Battle of Los Angeles was an anti-aircraft artillery barrage in February 1942 over Los Angeles, California, in response to a perceived attack on the continental United States by Imperial Japan, subsequently attributed to a case of "war nerves" likely triggered by a lost weather balloon.

Battle of Los Angeles may also refer to:

== Historical events ==
- Battle of Los Ángeles, a military action fought on March 22, 1880, between the Chilean and Peruvian armies during the Tacna and Arica Campaign of the War of the Pacific
- Siege of Los Angeles, which took place in August 1846 during the Mexican–American War
- 1992 Los Angeles riots, which occurred in April and May 1992 following the acquittal of police officers involved in the arrest and beating of Rodney King

== Entertainment ==
- The Battle of Los Angeles (album), a 1999 album by Rage Against the Machine
- Battle: Los Angeles, a 2011 science fiction and action film directed by South African filmmaker Jonathan Liebesman
  - Battle of Los Angeles (film), a direct-to-DVD science-fiction film by independent film company The Asylum, based on the same concept
- The Battle for L.A.: Footsoldiers, Vol. 1, a 2004 documentary about rap battling in Los Angeles
- The title of ninth issue of The Champions, a comic book by Marvel Comics

== Sports events ==
- The Battle of Los Angeles (professional wrestling), an annual professional wrestling tournament held by Pro Wrestling Guerrilla
- A nickname for various sports rivalries, such as:
  - El Tráfico, between the LA Galaxy and Los Angeles FC (soccer)
  - Freeway Face-Off, between the Anaheim Ducks and Los Angeles Kings (ice hockey)
  - Freeway Series, between the Los Angeles Angels and Los Angeles Dodgers (baseball)
  - SuperClasico, between the LA Galaxy and Chivas USA (soccer)
  - the Lakers–Clippers rivalry (basketball)
  - the annual USC–UCLA football game (college football)

== Other ==
- "The Great Battle of Los Angeles", a painting by California artist Sandow Birk

== See also ==
- 1941 (film), a 1979 film by Steven Spielberg, loosely based on the Battle of Los Angeles
