= Bolla (name) =

Bolla is a given name and surname. Notable people with the name include:

== Given name ==
- Bolla Conradie (born 1978), South African rugby union footballer
- Bolla Bulli Ramaiah (1926–2018), Indian politician

== Surname ==
- Bendegúz Bolla (born 1999), Hungarian footballer
- Giovanni Bolla (1650–1735), Italian painter
- Jim Bolla (1952–2022), American basketball coach
- R. Bolla or Robert Kerman (1947–2018), American actor
- Sophie Farkas Bolla, Canadian film editor
- Srikanth Bolla (born 1991), Indian industrialist
- Vittorio Bolla (1932–2002), Italian ice hockey player

== See also ==
- Bola (name), given name and surname
- Mark DeBolla (born 1983), English footballer
- Rio Fredrika Debolla (born 1995), English presenter and model
