= Mobolanle Ebunoluwa Sotunsa =

Mobolanle Ebunoluwa Sotunsa, also known as Bola Sotunsa, is a Nigerian academic. She is a Professor of Gender Studies and African Oral Literatures in the Department of Languages and Literary Studies, Babcock University.https://www.babcock.edu.ng/faculty/Sotunsam

== Life ==
Sotunsa completed her MA at the University of Ibadan in 1998, later developing her thesis into the book Feminism and gender discourse: the African experience. She got her PhD from the English department at the University of Ibadan, where she was a student of Ademola Dasylva.

Sotunsa joined the Language and Literary Studies Department at Babcock University, becoming a senior lecturer and head of department. In 2018 she delivered her inaugural lecture as Professor of Gender Studies and African Oral Literatures at Babcock University, on 'Gender matters and cultural dilemmas in African literature'.

== Works ==
- Feminism and gender discourse: the African experience. Sagamu, Nigeria: Asaba Publications, 2009.
- Yorùbá drum poetry. London: Stillwatersstudios, 2009.
- 'Feminism: The Quest for an African Variant', in Journal of Pan-African Studies, Vol. 3, No. 1 (2009), pp.227-234
- (ed. with F. B. O. Akporobaro and Solomon Odiase Iguanre) Landmark and new essays in literary and linguistic theories and analysis. Ikeja, Lagos, Nigeria: Princeton Publishing Co., 2010.
- (ed. with Olajumoke Yacob-Haliso) Women in Africa : Contexts, Rights, Hegemonies. Lagos: Jedidiah Publishers, 2012.
- (ed. with Akinloyè Ojó) Fieldwork in Nigerian oral literature. Ilishan Remo, Ogun State: Write Right Academic Publishing, 2014.
- (ed. with Karim Traoré and Akinloyè Ojó) Expressions of indigenous and local knowledge in Africa and its diaspora. Newcastle upon Tyne: Cambridge Scholars Publishing, 2016.
- (ed. with Michael A. Omolewa & Philemon O. Amanze) Emerging discourses on the future of higher education in Africa. Ilishan-Remo, Ogun State, Nigeria: Babcock University Press, 2016.
- (ed. with Olajumoke Yacob-Haliso) Gender, Culture and Development in Africa. Pan-African University Press, 2017. ISBN 978-1943533275
- (ed, with Babatunde Olanrewaju Adebua) 'Dialectics and structural organization in the Ẹ̀bìbì festival performances of the Ẹ̀pẹ́ people in Lagos State, Nigeria'. Yoruba Studies Review, Vol. 2, No. 2 (Spring 2018), pp.199-213
- (ed. with Abikal Borah) Imagining Vernacular Histories: Essays in Honor of Toyin Falola. Rowman & Littlefield, 2020. ISBN 978-1786614612
