= Ikoro, Ekiti State =

Town in southwest Nigeria

Ikoro-Ekiti is a town in the Ijero Local Government area of Ekiti State, south west Nigeria. It is also known as Eso Obe and is one of the oldest towns in Ekiti land. It was politically subsumed under the paramountry of Ijero, the Ijero Native Authority, the Ijero District, which has now become Ijero Local Government. Historic facts have it that, the present Ikoro-Ekiti is a conglomeration of sixteen settlements dating from the eighteenth century and originally settled by Olugona who gave Oluse of Isedo the functional powers due to his old age. Today, Ikoro-Ekiti, has two main Quarters: Oke-Oja and Odokoro with many streets, is a large town noted for production of cocoa, kola nut, timber and palm fruit. In fact, the town was a major contributor of the products to the socio-economic development of the old western Nigeria. Ikoro-Ekiti has modern facilities and the people have a high degree of hospitality. Moreover, the people are very resourceful, with many of the indigene holding positions in many areas of human endeavors across the globe. The traditional head of the town is called the Olukoro of Ikoro-Ekiti, a first class king in the Ekiti State Traditional Council . The present king, His Royal Majesty Oba Olanrewaju Adebanji Adeleye (Atewogboye II) is the 15th Olukoro. He ascended the throne in 2008 after twenty four years of an interregnum in the kingship.

== The list Of Olukoro of Ikoro-Ekiti ==
- Olukoro Fatiku Ona-Owuro
- Olukoro Olofinshola
- Olukoro Oleranlatan
- Olukoro Adugbalaja
- Olukoro Ojo Tipalehin
- Olukoro Kokoirinfojudina
- Olukoro Akuruija
- Olukoro Ogodo-Agbe
- Olukoro Ogbeseokin
- Olukoro Akoworo 1
- Olukoro Alaganju Ogbo
- Olukoro Faleye Ibikunle
- Olukoro Atewogboye
- Olukoro Akoworo II

== The list of Sakoros ==
- Sakoro Awonbi-Ogbon
- Sakoro Atara Atowuapon
- Sakoro Oke Adigunlose.
- Sakoro Ogodoagbe Nyanrutinrin.
- Sakoro Agbemuko Alokonikere.
- Sakoro Ologbese Jegede
- Sakoro Ayogunmoru Esan.
- Sakoro Eleyin Jegede.
- Sakoro Akekuejo Ojo Saji
- Sakoro Olajide Esan
- Sakoro Ojo Olutoyin

== The list of Eisabas ==
Eisaba, by official ranking, is the titular head of Oke-Oja sub-community in Ikoro-Ekiti while the Sakoro is also the titular head of the Odo-Ikoro sub-community. In hierarchy, Eisaba is third in rank to the Kabiyesi Olukoro while Sakoro holds the second rank. Eisaba is usually selected from the Erinse civil traditional group while Sakoro is also selected from the Ihare civil traditional group. Many title holders of the exalted office of Eisaba have reigned along with several Olukoros in Ikoro history.

- Odekogbomo-Erin.
- Odide-gbona-seyi
- Akangiran-Edun
- Osaji (Father of Omoleyiyo, mother of

Eisaba Oke Aga).

- Adokoluyi (Father of Ola Oloberekedo).
- Fakanbi (Husband to Omosa, Oke Aga).
- Tako - (From Olulupe & father of Ejisun

Iyunade)

- Farounmu Adiwoiyanmogun (from Ojobe,

Father of Ejemu Faponmile & Great Grand- father of incumbent Eisaba Dr. Bamidele Oluyole)

- Ipeti-nawo-Iran-kanle
- Ogirigbo (from Oke Aragan & father of

Agbele-nko Akande)

- Ojo Arigbawoja, (from Olulupe & elder

brother of Ejisun Iyunade)

- James Adejuwon Adekunle (son of

Oluborode).

- Joshua Akanbi Ojo (from Ojobe & son of

Ajolopo Ero & Grandson of Ominio Famoroti Okerebadina).

- Dr. Bamidele Oluyole, (Eisaba

Adiwoiyanmogi II, from Ojobe & grand- son of Ejemu Faponmile since February 2017-?).

Ikoro Ekiti, also known as Eso Obe, is one of the oldest towns in Ekiti.

It was subsumed under the paramountry of Ijero, the Ijero Native Authority, and the Ijero District, which has now become Ijero Local Government.

Ikoro had the largest land mass among its contemporaries. It had boundaries with lIa Orangun, Esa Oke (before Oke Imesi came to occupy a portion of its land), Ido Ajinare, Odo Ehin (now Odo Owa ), Ijero. The town could also boast of maintaining a large Army of 2000 professional soldiers' who were dreaded by armies of other surrounding towns and beyond.

The town is situated in a plain ground and has a captivating outlook when viewed from the air. The forest is rich in economic trees, and the soil is very fertile for both arable and cash crops. Since the introduction of cocoa to the town in the 1920s, Ikoro had been one of the largest cocoa producers in Ekiti. It had also occupied a recognizable position in the production of cola nut, palm produce and timber.

Ikoro had about 75 farmsteads, many of which had grown into full blown sub-towns and villages with full complement of modern structures like Churches, Mosques, Schools and Markets. This makes the town distinct the whole of Ekiti.

Ikoro indigenes are known for their accommodating proposition and a high degree of hospitality. As a result, many people from various parts of the country have settled down permanently in the town and its suburbs dwelling peacefully among the indigenes, As a result, the town has become a conglomeration of various cultural and ethnic mix.

THE ORIGIN AND DEVELOPMENT

The origin of Ikoro Ekiti is dated back to the ancient time. It started as a conglomeration of various settlements which situated at different locations all over the land that belonged to what was to be known as Ikoro.

The establishment of Ikoro came in two stages. The first stage was when the founders, who were sixteen in number, came from various parts of Yoruba land and settled in various locations, with their followers whom they ruled according to the dictates of the deities which they worshipped

The great sixteen founders were

1. The Olugona of lgona

2. The Oluse of Isedo

3. The Aorere of lgbo orere

4. The Olujoko of lgbo ojoko

5. The Alatan of lgboatan

6. The Oloriri of Igbo oriri

7. The Akinja of lgbookun

8. The Elewu of Ewu

9. The Onikun of Odoikun

10. The Aaye of Omu

11. The Olorisa oba of lgbo orisaoba

12. The Oniwe of Okewe

13. The Aoroeko of Oke agbon

14. The Oniteru of Igbo Ogan

15. The Ayelufe of Orooku

16. The Oloke of Ikufana

These people are popularly referred to as "Awon agba merindinlogun to te Ikoro do".

The second stage was when all the sixteen settlements came together to form a formidable settlement under the leadership ofOlugona of Igona and Oluse of Isedo.

The first person to settle with his own people in the site was Olugona whose origin could also be traced to lIe-ife from where his own grandparent migrated to settle at either lIa Orangun or Igbajo from where he migrated to settle in another distance place from Oluse called Igona. But eventually the two of them met and were attracted to each other. Whereas Oluse was a great hunter, Olugona was an herbalist on the side apart from also being a hunter; he was also very wealthy because he came from wealthy family.

The second person to settle with his people in the present site of Ikoro was Oluse of Isedo whose origin could be traced to lIe- ife from where his grandparent migrated to settle at Ido faboro. He migrated from there on hunting expedition, stopping to settle briefly at Orita Imesi lie and eventually moved to stay in a place called "Idi Agbon" which eventually became known as ISEDO.

In the cause of time other settlements were established and Olugona and Oluse discover them. They invited leaders of the newly discovered settlements to join them in the confederacy. The confederacy was achieved under the leadership of Olugona and Oluse. Their meetings were held in Oluse's palace (having been assigned functional power by Olugona due to his old age) in Isedo. There were no clear-cut chieftaincy titles in the confederacy. The lorooku (i.e. rulers who were also the priest of the deities) were the chiefs. So the administration was mainly theocratic.

There was a spiritual being who had occupied the center of the place that became Ikoro, at Ojobe whose name was Olobe, Oluse had a surprise encounter with her as she usually came out from her abode inside the stream. Although she did not come into the confederation with the sixteen great founders, she had a protective domain over them, and they consulted her particularly wherever they were to go to war. She blessed them and they were usually successful. In-appreciation they made ritual to her annually.

THE ESTABLISHMENT OF KINGSHIP

The coming of Fatiku who was the son of Onaowuro and the grandson of Ogbolukore (both Ajero kings of Ijero) who became the first king in settlement was a turning point in the history of Ikoro. He left Ijero because of kingship tussle between him and his junior brother who was installed Ajero when Fatiku, the rightful successor to throne was away in pursuit of his profession of ifa consultation for royal families in other towns, one of the places was Ijamo in Ondo kingdom.

Fatiku came to Ikoro and lodged with Oluse in his palace in Isedo In course of tune, and because he usually made his plight that he was robbed of his kingship known to Olugona and Oluse of the time, he was granted the right of kingship with the consent of the duo of Olugona and Oluse as well as the other "Ioroukus"

Fatiku had three male children, one each from his three wives. They were Olofinsola, Falokun Oleranlatan, and Adugbalaja Ewon. The three succeeded him one after the other. They were the ancestors of the current royal family lines.

Fourteen kings had ruled in Ikoro before the current king, His Royal Majesty Dr. Olanrewaju Adebanji Adeleye Atewogboye II. The actual dates when the first eight kings ruled cannot be accurately ascertained, but it is assumed that they ruled from the early 17th century to 1802.

The fourteen Kings in chronological order were as follows:-

- 1. FATIKU ONAOWURO, ERINYOWO IJALALA:- He reigned for nine years. His tenure witnessed the creation of Olori marun" chieftaincy titles (Olukoro, Sakoro, Esaba, Esinkin, Ominio - based on the three divisions of Erinse, Ihare, and Uro), and the separation of palace assembly from Oluse assembly which later become Iberekedo from which the Ogbon was excised much later.
- 2. OLOFINSOLA: was the eldest son of Fatiku and the second king at Ikoro. The "Agbon" festival also known as "Iyo" was started by the Iberekedo during his reign.
- 3. FALOKUN OLERANLATAN:- He was the third king. Much progress was made during his reign in the administration in the town.
- 4. ADUGBALAJA:- His period witnessed more immigration into the town. The period also witnessed the birth of Epa festival.
- 5. OJO TIPA IGI WOROKO DANARU:- It was during his reign that Ikoro warriors participated in the Adoibini war during the reign of Okengbuda (Ogbomodu) as oba of Benin between 1752 and 1782. lkoro warriors fought on the side of Ado Ekiti.
- 6. KORE ONAOWURO KOKOIGI FOJUDINA:- His reign witnessed the war of Oge Ijesha against Ijero kingdom in which Elebeyin Agboerigan fought on the side of Ijero, and the war ended in favor Qf Ijero.
- 7. AINA AKURUJA:- His reign corresponded with the period of Elebeyin Atiku of Odo Ogede. The five "Orun (symbolic mounds) were made in the Ofin, Oloberekedo, Elebeyin, Olomese and Eyejumu palaces by the help of Eisaba Odidegbonasyhin.
- 8.EYEBIOKIN SOWON:- He planned the digging of the trench (odi) round the town, but his plan could not be accomplished because of his early death In 1802.
- 9. OGBESE OKUN SORO:-(1802-1814) He completed the digging of the trench (odi) round the town.
- 10. ADETULA AlAGIRIJA AKOWORO I(1814-1849) He constructed the four (4) Ekiti Omolare (symbolic pillars), on the path to Olobe shrine at Ojobe, Oke Aragan, Okeimesi and Oja Ojobe. The Ibadan - Ikaro war took place during his reign and died as a result of the war.
- 11. ALAGANJU OGBO AGBAFIDIOBE MULE:-(1885 - 1896):- HiS reign witnessed the re establishment of Ikoro. Actually he was made king after the return of the people from Ayede and Ibadan in 1867 but was not installed until 1885. The formation of Ajo Ogbon (the Ogbon Assembly) excised from Iberekedo took place during his reign.
- 12. FALAYE IDIKUNLE -ESINSIN OLUMOROKO AJONI MOJUJA:- (1896 - 1918) He was appointed a traditional judge at the establishment of native court at Ijero in 1915 by the colonial administration. He was dethroned and exiled in 1918.
- 13. ADELEYE ATEWOGBOYE I (1921 - 1939) It was during his reign that the modern" palace with iron sheets was built. The road linking Ikoro with Ijero was constructed during his reign in 1928. The native administration of the colonial Government introduced the payment of taxes during his reign. The building of mosque and that of the Apostolic Church took place during his reign.
- 14. MICHEAL ODUNLADE AKOWORO I(1939–1984) He was the first educated Oba in Ikoro and one of the very few elite kings in the defunct Ondo province. The western region government sponsored him course in the University of Ibadan 1951. He was among the kings in the western region of Nigeria sponsored for an agricultural overseas tour in 1955. It was during his reign Ikoro - Okemesi road was constructed in 1947. A customary court of which he was president was granted to Ikoro in 1956. He was the first king for whom a car was purchased by Ikoro community.

Following the demise of Oba Michael Odunlade, there was a long period of interregnum which lasted for 'twenty four (24) years. A regent, Princes Abigeal Adegoke, was appointed. But the period was marred with crises, most of which were linked with long tussle over selection of the king. There were prolonged litigation over the issue. Also the so-called "Town Youths" "Awon Odo Ilu" held the town to ransom on the same and related issue for about seven years, and the activities and tussle ended in brutal assassination of the most senior chief (Chief Olajide Esan the Sakoro) in June 1999.
