= Zeeuwse bolus =

Dutch sweet pastry of Sephardic Jewish origin

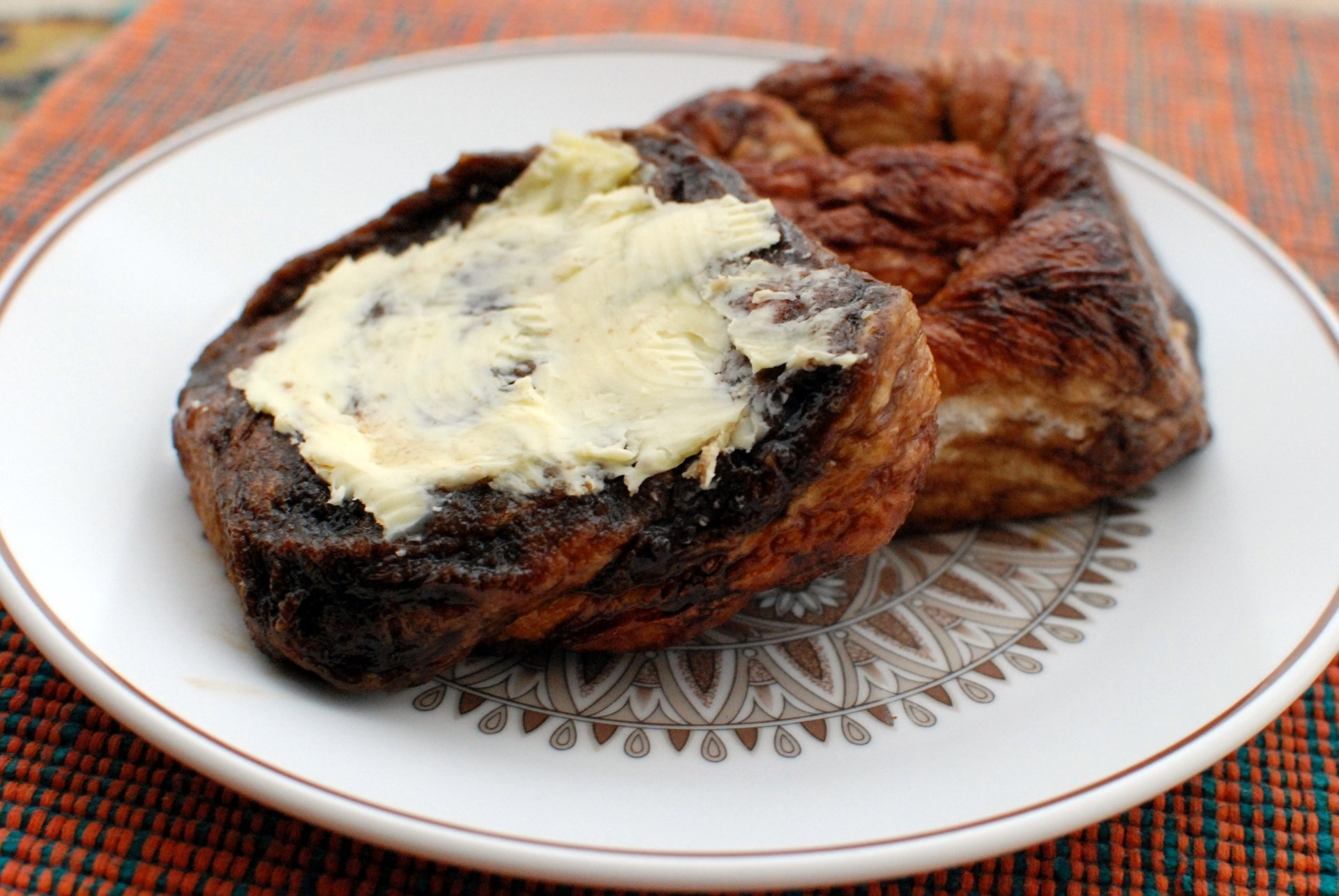
- A Zeeuwse bolus served traditionally with butter on the flat underside.
- Alternative names: Bolus, jikkemine, drol (slang)
- Type: Sweet bread
- Course: Snack / Coffee accompaniment
- Place of origin: Netherlands
- Region or state: Zeeland
- Created by: Sephardic Jewish bakers
- Serving temperature: Warm or cold
- Main ingredients: Yeast dough, dark brown sugar, cinnamon, lemon zest (optional)
- Variations: Ginger bolus, Orangeade bolus

A Zeeuwse bolus (Dutch pronunciation: [ˈzeːusə ˈboːlʏs]; plural: Zeeuwse bolussen) is a sweet bread of Jewish origin from the Dutch province of Zeeland. It is made by baking a tender white yeast dough rolled in dark brown sugar (basterdsuiker) and cinnamon in a spiral shape. The sugar melts during baking to form a sticky, caramel-like coating.

The shape of a bolus differs between bakers. In some parts of the region, the dough also includes lemon zest, though this is rarer. They are often eaten with coffee, and the flatter underside is frequently covered with butter.

== History ==
The bolus was introduced to Zeeland in the late 16th and early 17th centuries by Sephardic Jewish bakers fleeing religious persecution in Portugal and Spain. These refugees settled in the Dutch Republic, with a notable community establishing itself in Middelburg. The Jewish cemetery in Middelburg (located on the Jodengang) attests to this Portuguese-Jewish presence.

The Jewish bakers created the predecessor of the Zeeuwse bolus, likely based on the Sephardic *bollo*. Later, bakers from Zeeland perfected the art of the bolus, often using steam ovens to keep the cinnamon pastry tender while caramelizing the sugar layer.

== Etymology ==
The word bolus comes from Yiddish. The Van Dale etymological dictionary states that bolus or boles is the plural of bole, which derives from the Spanish bollo meaning "fine bun" or "roll", or bola which means "ball".

== Variations ==
There is another kind of pastry sold under the name Bolus or boles in the Netherlands, primarily within the Jewish community in Amsterdam. These include:

- Ginger boles: Made of dough filled with stem ginger.
- Orangeade boles: Filled with orangeade and almond meal flavoured with orange and almonds.

These boles are typically a golden yellow colour, baked in paper forms, and must be eaten with a spoon due to the sticky syrup.

== International spread ==
The bolus is considered an originally Jewish pastry and has spread globally during the diaspora. Similar pastries are traditionally sold in Jerusalem, Moscow, Paris, and the south of France. In New York City, similar pastries known as "sticky buns" or "Schnecken" share a common lineage.

== Competition ==
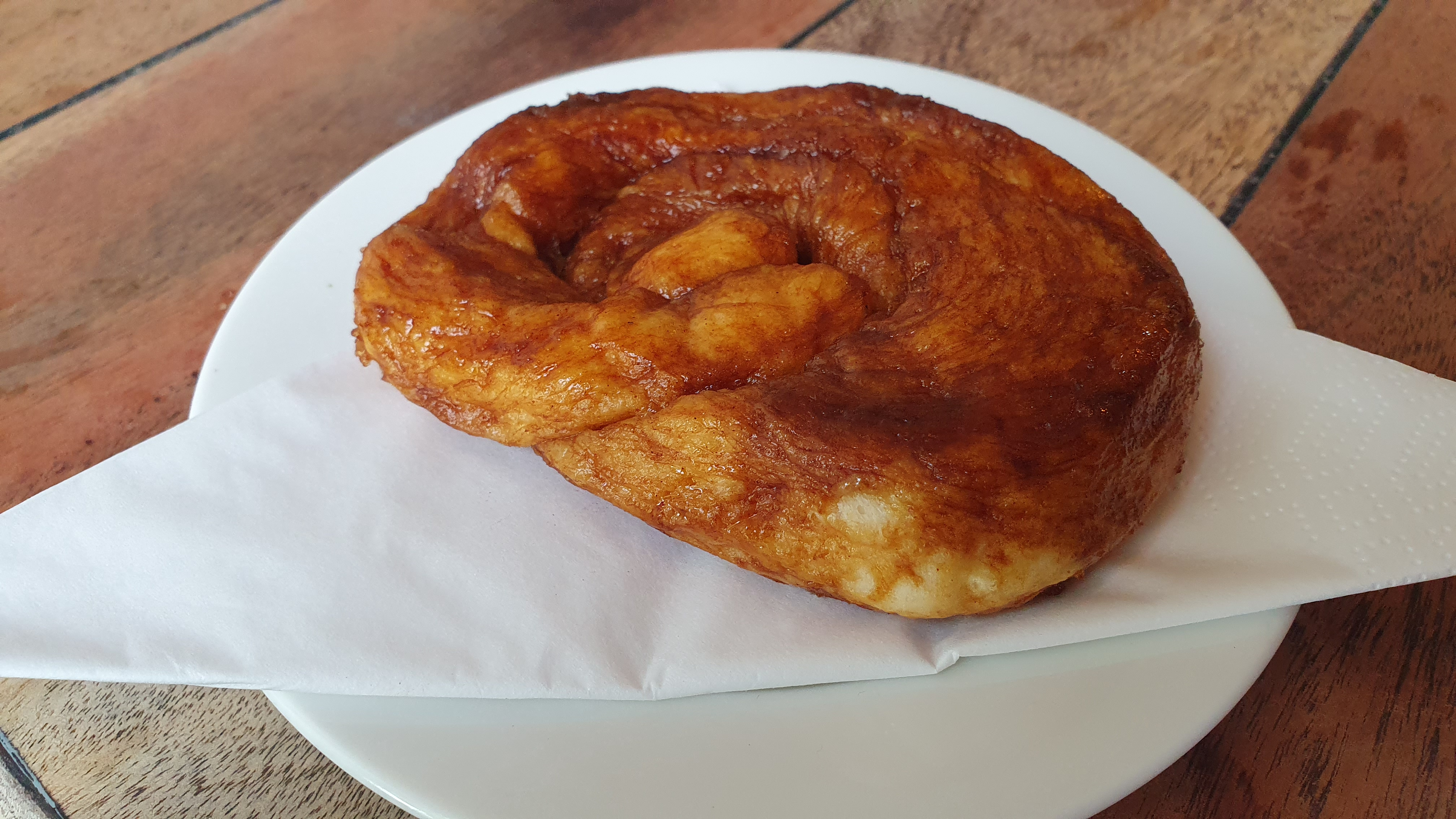
A bolus, typical for the province of Zeeland

Until 1998, boluses were judged in baking competitions alongside bread, cakes, and other pastries. Since 1998, the "Bolusbaking Championships Zeeland" has been held annually, organized by the Dutch Bakery Centre and Zeelandia.

The competition typically takes place during "Bolus Week" (the 12th week of the year). Participating bakers submit eight boluses for judgment. A jury selects the top ten finalists, and the winner is subsequently chosen by the audience. The winner receives the Bolus Trophy and the title "Best Bolus Baker" for a year.
