= Malvina Bolus =

Canadian historian and art collector

Malvina Marjorie Bolus
- Born: July 4, 1906; Fox Bay, Falkland Islands
- Died: April 6, 1997 (aged 90)
- Occupation(s): historian and art collector
- Awards: Order of Canada

Malvina Marjorie Bolus, OC (July 4, 1906 – April 6, 1997) was a Canadian historian and art collector, best known as the editor of the Hudson's Bay Company magazine The Beaver.

Born in Fox Bay, Falkland Islands, she was educated in England, and emigrated to Canada in 1926. From 1928 to 1936, she was a member of the House of Commons of Canada staff. From 1933 to 1936, she was the secretary to Agnes Macphail, the first woman to be elected to the House of Commons.

She started working at the Hudson's Bay Company in 1956 in public relations. From 1958 to 1972, she was the editor of The Beaver magazine.

She is the author of Image of Canada (1953), Eskimo Art (1967), and People and Pelts (1972).

In 1970, she was made an Officer of the Order of Canada.

== Sources ==
- "Canadian Who's Who 1997 entry".
