= Bola Johnson =

Nigerian musician (1947–2014)

- Born: 6 July 1947; Lagos, British Nigeria
- Origin: Lagos, Nigeria
- Died: 6 April 2014 (aged 66); Ikorodu, Nigeria
- Occupation: Musician

Bola Johnson (6 July 1947 — 6 April 2014) was a Nigerian musician and bandleader.

He was born to a traditional musician family, and had his primary school at Livings Stone Academy situated at Ijero, in Ebute-Metta, Lagos. After his primary school education, he gained admission into Eko Boys High School, Mushin, Lagos. In 1963 due to lack of finance, he stopped studying when he was in the fourth class of his secondary school education.

Eventually, he decided to learn typing in the commercial school in Ebute-Meta, Lagos; within three months he was able to type. During this period, BJ was a really good footballer. His sport activities secured him a job through a talent finder. He relocated to Ilorin in Kwara State as a typist with Government Trade Centre (Ilorin) Kwara state in Nigeria, where he played for the state football club. He played for the senior team until in 1965; as a result of Northern zoning policy he left Ilorin for Ibadan. Due to his love for music, Bola Johnson played in the band of Mr Eric Akaeze a highlife band in Ibadan; he played maracas in the group. In the process, Bola Johnson learns how to blow the trumpet. After he had mastered how to play the trumpet, Bola Johnson formed his own band and named it (Bola Johnson and his Easy Life Top Beats) in 1968. During his musical career in Ibadan, Bola Johnson took part in a comedy Programme called "Hello Fans" in Radio Nigeria Ibadan and played a part as Papa Rebecca (Rebecca’s father). Been popular in Ibadan, Bola Johnson moved to Zaria in the northern part of Nigeria, with his band. He played Fridays and Saturdays in a Hotel Called "Jubilee Hotel" in Zaria. Later Bola Johnson went back to Lagos to wax more recording, by then he had many singles recorded. One of them is the popular "Asewo Ajegunle Yakare" recorded by Philips Records and many others. In the 1970s Bola Johnson started writing scripts for newspapers as a freelance journalist for daily times as "Wakabout" in Lagos weekend newspapers, and in daily Sketch newspapers Ibadan, etc. In 1970, Bola Johnson joined the Radio Nigeria Band Wagon, and played a role as (I Go Die O!). Bola Johnson had so many recordings as Papa Rebecca a comedy radio programme, a comic trail Wakabout, and I GO DIE O! Played in Federal Radio Corporation of Nigeria (Federal Radio Corporation of Nigeria Lagos) live, in different music shows, he took part in so many popular shows. In 1970, he was employed, as DJ in FRCN his program was a greetings program called I Salute O! (I am greeting o! A Highlife music section programme) Bola Johnson developed his own Pidgin English style by telling stories in his programme, after the creation of Lagos weekend newspaper in 1970 Bola Johnson was employed as a freelance journalist with his own columns called "Wakabout" due to his stories in Pidgin English and its popularity.

Johnson worked until 2013 as freelance presenter in FRCN, writing Pidgin English scripts for some Nollywood film producers that make home comedies videos in Nigeria. Johnson spoke Yoruba, Hausa, and Igbo fluently. He was married and had three children, two girls and one boy.

Johnson died in his Ikorodu home on 6 April 2014. His remains was taken to his hometown Obon in Delta state, Nigeria. On 30 April 2014 was buried and a traditional service was held with his family and his fans to pay their last respects.
