= Bolo (bread) =

Sweet bread

Bolo, also known as Bulu, is a sweet, round bread of Sephardi Jewish origin which is commonly prepared by Tunisian Jews, Libyan Jews, and Italian Jews, among others, for the high holidays such as Rosh Hashanah and for other special occasions.

== Overview ==
Bolo is a sweet, round bread commonly flavored with anise, although it can contain nuts or other flavorings. The bread can be eaten at any time but is most common during the Jewish High Holiday season. The bread was very popular among the Sephardic Jewish community of North Africa, and with their exodus to Israel, France, and North America, it has become a part of the local Jewish cuisine in these countries as well. Sephardic Jews continue to make bolo to this day. It is eaten by Persian Jews as well, who call it bulu.
