= Humanitarian response to the 2004 Indian Ocean earthquake =

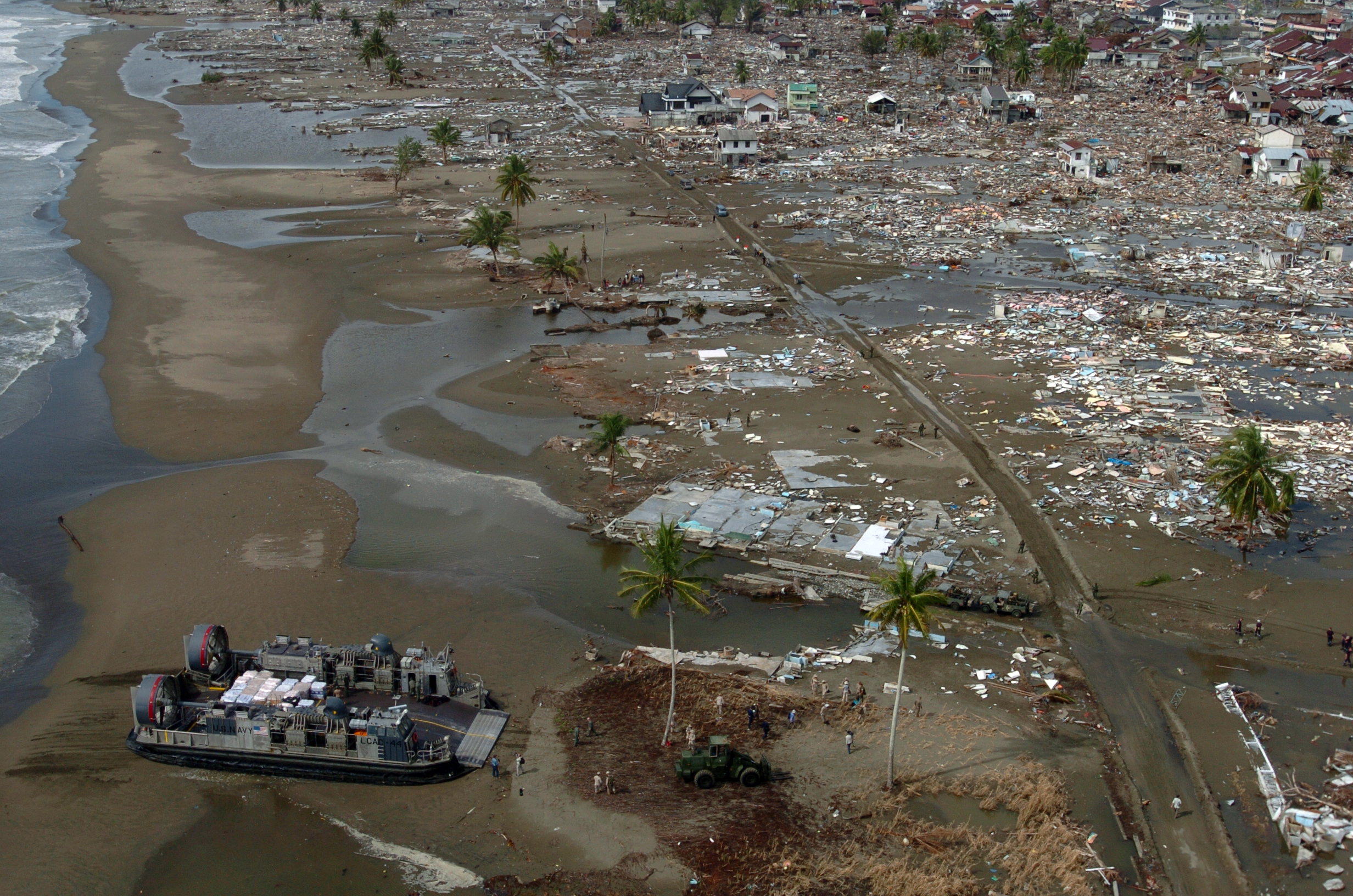
Landing Craft Air Cushion (LCAC) Hovercraft from USS Bonhomme Richard (LHD 6) delivering supplies to the citizens of Meulaboh, Indonesia, after the 2004 Indian Ocean Tsunami.

The humanitarian response to the 2004 Indian Ocean earthquake of a magnitude of 9.2–9.3 was prompted by one of the worst natural disasters of modern times. On 26 December 2004, the earthquake, which struck off the northwest coast of the Indonesian island of Sumatra, generated a tsunami that wreaked havoc along much of the rim of the Indian Ocean. Particularly hard-hit were the countries of Indonesia, India, Sri Lanka and Thailand. About 230,000 people were killed, tens of thousands more were injured, and 1.7 million became homeless and displaced.

== Contributing countries and supra-national organizations ==
Asian expatriates, governments, humanitarian organisations and individuals around the world arrived, eager to offer aid and technical support. The global scale of the disaster led to three rapid activations of the International Charter on Space and Major Disasters: by the French Civil Protection Agency for Sri Lanka, by the Indian space agency ISRO the Maldives, for India, particularly the Andaman and Nicobar Islands in the southeast, and by the United Nations Office for Outer Space Affairs (UNOOSA), acting on behalf of the United Nations Office for Project Services (UNOPS), for Indonesia and Thailand. The World Bank initially estimated the amount of aid needed at USD $4-5 billion. Although numerous countries provided help for relief and assistance, the UN criticised both the US and Europe for providing inadequate resources. By 1 January 2005 over US$1.8 billion (£1bn) had been pledged.

In wake of the disaster, Australia, India, Japan and the United States formed a coalition to coordinate aid efforts to streamline immediate assistance. However, at the Jakarta Summit on 6 January 2005, the coalition transferred responsibilities to the United Nations.

=== Criticism of donor response ===
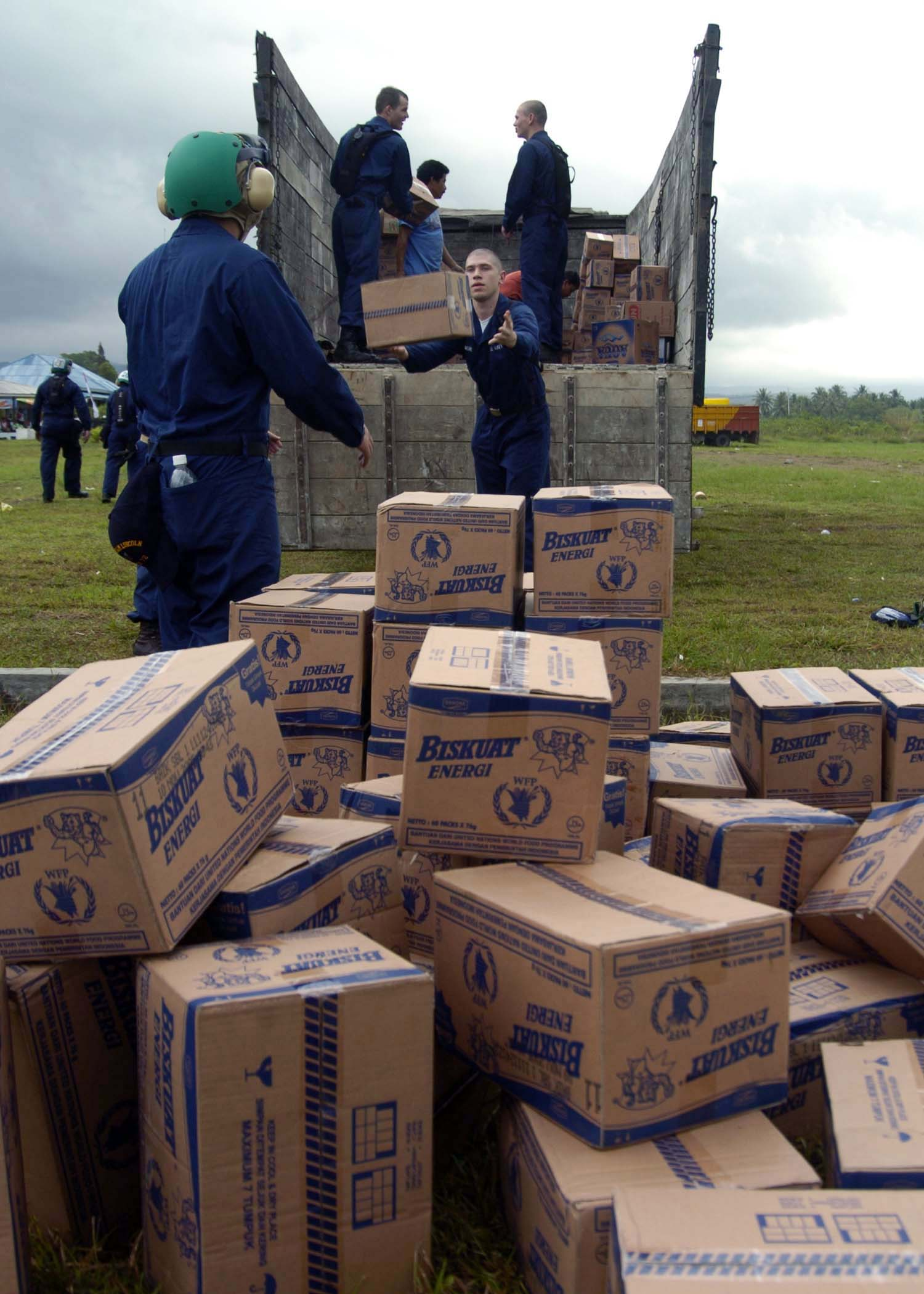
Sailors of USS Abraham Lincoln prepare for aerial resupply drops by US helicopters.

Throughout the entire period of the main response to the tsunami disaster – from December 2004 for the next four or five years – there was much debate about both the size and form of way that assistance was delivered. For example, just one day after the tsunami, on 27 December 2004, UN Undersecretary-General for Humanitarian Affairs Jan Egeland reportedly categorised the contributions of rich countries as "stingy". This was widely misinterpreted in the media as categorising the overall response to the tsunami whereas Mr Egeland later explained that at the time he had been making a general remark about overall global aid flows in recent years. Speaking at a press conference later Mr. Egeland said, "It has nothing to do with any particular country or the response to this emergency. We are in early days and the response has so far been overwhelmingly positive". The U.S. government, led by President George W. Bush and Secretary of State Colin Powell, added another US$20 million on 28 December to the original U.S. pledge of US$15 million, bringing the total up to US$35 million (not including direct aid rendered by naval vessels dispatched to the region). Initially, the U.S. Navy dispatched P-3C Orion patrol aircraft and an aircraft carrier to assist with relief operations.

On 31 December the US pledge was increased tenfold to US$350 million, with President Bush saying that that amount would probably increase further. President Bush also signed a decree ordering flags to be flown at half-mast during the first week of the new year, from January 3rd through sunset on the 7th.

During the early period of the response to the tsunami, concerns were voiced in various quarters that the international relief effort might falter if nations did not honour their initial pledges. On 3 January 2005, UN Secretary-General Kofi Annan urged donor nations to ensure that their pledges were fully honoured, pointing to previous cases where "we got lots of pledges, but we did not receive all the money".

On 5 January, as countries jockeyed to make large donations, Jan Egeland said, "I'd rather see competitive compassion than no compassion", adding that too many countries were making pledges without any guarantee that the funds would arrive. Following the earthquake the previous year in Iran in Bam which killed 26,000 people, Iranian officials claimed to have received just US$17.5 million of the US$1 billion originally pledged. In mid-March 2005, the Asian Development Bank reported that the provision of over US$4 billion in aid promised by governments was behind schedule. Sri Lanka criticised the nations and organisations that clamoured to pledge donations, "Not a penny had come through yet. We are doing the relief work with our government money. Sri Lanka is still waiting for the money pledged by the donors. Money pledged by the people has been pledged to the NGOs."

Sri Lanka's Foreign Minister, Lakshman Kadirgamar, stated in a BBC interview, "A lot of aid what has been coming in latterly is I'm afraid – I'm sorry to say – not very useful. For instance there was a container full of teddy bears. They're obviously given with good will, nobody says no to that." The patience of tsunami affected nations was being stretched: "Now the government had worked out a scheme that until 26 April everything that has come, everything that will be on the seas will be admitted tax free. After that, no!". Kadirgamar went on to say, "For instance we do not need rice, we are expecting a bumper harvest, anyone who sends rice is wasting their time and money."

Many commentators claim excessive and competitive donor responses threaten less dramatic but equally important relief efforts elsewhere. "While everyone opens up their coffers for these disasters, the ongoing toll from malaria, AIDS and tuberculosis is much larger than these one-time events", said Enriqueta Bond, president of the US Burroughs Wellcome Fund. "We would do more good to invest in prevention and good public-health measures such as clean water". Tony Blair, the British prime minister, also expressed concern that tsunami aid could detract from other pressing development needs. He pointed out that there was a disaster comparable to a "preventable tsunami every week in Africa", where 10,000 people die daily from AIDS and malaria alone.

=== Criticism of recipient response ===
In the early stages, before the extent of the disaster was clear, Sri Lanka refused Israel's offers of aid, objecting to the inclusion of 60 Israeli soldiers in the 150-person mission planned by Israel's army, to set up field hospitals, including internal medicine and paediatric clinics, an Israeli army spokesman reported to BBC. Later, the Israeli humanitarian organization sent a jumbo jet carrying 18.5 tonnes of supplies to Colombo, however, and a rescue-and-recovery team from the Jewish ultra-Orthodox organization ZAKA arrived in Colombo with equipment used for identifying bodies, as well as body bags. Corruption, bureaucracy and nationalism hampered the humanitarian response in Indonesia.

In Sri Lanka, only 30% of those eligible affected by the tsunami as of 10 February had received any aid, and there were allegations of local officials giving aid only to their supporters, some of whom were not victims of the tsunami. The Sri Lankan government has set up a "Special Complaint Unit" for citizens to record grievances.

=== List of donors ===
The following table is a partial listing of cash commitments from various governments and nongovernmental organisations, taken from and other sources:

Note: Exchange rates were taken on 8 January 2005, when €1 = US$1.30585; GBP 1 = US$1.87110; CAD 1 = US$0.811853; AUD 1 = US$0.757346; HKD 1 = US$0.1282; 1 INR= US$0.0228102; 1 CNY= 0.120831; 1 NOK = US$0.158526; 1 DKK = 0.175711; 1 SEK = US$0.144363; and 1 CHF = US$0.844131.

Coun	Government	Permille of GNP	NGOs & Public (Excludes corporate donations – see below)	Permille of GNP	Total (in US$ millions)	Permille of GNP
Australia	A$1.377bn (see below) (US$1.099bn)	2.03my	A$280M (US$223.4M)	0.41	1,322	2.44
Austria	€50M (US$65.30M)	0.26	€20M (US$26.12M)	0.10	91.42	0.36
Belgium	€12M (US$15.67M)	0.05	€38.05M (US$49.70M)	0.17	65.37	0.22
Bosnia & Herzegovina	US$67,000
Cambodia	US$40,000
Canada	Federal C$425M (US$414M) Provincial C$18.5M (US$15.02M)	0.70	Public C$230 (US$185.8M), BusinessC$36.3M (US$29.47M)	0.28	743.68	0.98
China (PRC)	CNY 522M (US$63.07M) plus US$20M	0.035	CNY about 500M (US$60M) (USD)		146
Croatia	US$917,000
Cyprus	US$1.3M
Czech Republic	CZK 200M (US$9M)	0.10	CZK 230M (US$10M)	0.12	19	0.22
Denmark	DKK 420M (US$74M)	0.44	DKK 200M (US$36M)	0.21	110	0.65
Equatorial Guinea	US$200,000
Estonia	US$390,000
European Union	US$615M	n/a	n/a	n/a	615	n/a
Finland	€50M (US$65.3M)	0.40	€18.5M (US$24.2M)	0.15	89.5	0.55
France	€250M (US$302.84M)	0.18	?	?	> 302.84	> 0.18
Germany	€500M (US$653M) + €20M (US$26M) for immediate aid	0.27	€450M (US$580M)	0.22	> 1,300	> 0.50
Greece	€1.3M (US$1.7M)	0.01	€19M (US$24.8M)	0.14	26.5	0.15
Hong Kong	HKD 50M (US$6.41M)	0.04	HKD 620M (US$79.48M)	0.5	85.89	0.54
Hungary	US$1.2M
India	INR 8 billion (US$183M)	0.3	?	?	> 183	> 0.3
Ireland	€20M (US$26.12M)	0.15	€75M (US$97.94M) (Source: Irish Times 18 March 2005)	0.92	117.94	1.09
Iran	US$627,000
Italy	€70M (US$91.4M)		€42M (US$57.3M)		> 120.13	> 0.085
Japan	US$500M	0.115	?	?	> 500	> 0.115
Kuwait	US$100M		?	?	> 100
Latvia	US$185,000
Lithuania	US$295,000
Luxembourg	US$6.9M
Macedonia	€1.5M (US$1.9M)	0.03
Madagascar	US$100,000
Monaco	US$133,000
Netherlands	€230M (US$300.5M)	0.58	> €160.5M (US$208.6M)	> 0.41	> 509.1	> 0.99
New Zealand	NZ 68M (US$47.2M)		> NZ 19M (US$13.1M)		> 60.4
Democratic People's Republic of Korea	US$150,000
Norway	NOK 1.1 billion (US$175.3M)		NOK 564M (US$89.8M)		265.1	1.19
Pakistan	PKR 10 million (US$0.2M)
Poland	US$1.6M
Portugal	€8M (US$10.45M)	0.07	?	?	10.45	0.07
Qatar	US$25M	1.43	?	?	> 25	> 1.43
Romania	US$240,000
Russia	US$2.0M
Saudi Arabia	US$30M		67.4M, US$		> 367.4	>
Senegal	US$200,000
Slovakia	US$360,000
Slovenia	US$110,000
South Korea	US$50M
Spain	€56M (US$73.13M)	0.087	?	?	> 73.13	> 0.087
Sweden	SEK 500M (US$72.2M)		SEK 1100M (US$159M)		177.2	0.5
Switzerland	CHF 27M (US$22.8M)		CHF 227M (US$191.6)		213.9
Taiwan	US$50.0M		US$60M		110	0.34
Turkey	TRY 28.9M		?	?	37.6
United Arab Emirates	US$20M		?	?	20
United Kingdom	£75M (US$145M)	0.083	£350M (US$655M) as of 26 February 2005	0.38	800	0.47
United States	US$950M	0.086	US$1875M	0.17	2,825	0.26
World Bank	US$1000M		n/a	n/a	250	n/a
Zimbabwe	US$3.2M
Total					>US$10bn

=== Pledged amounts as percentages of GDP ===
The table below examines the amounts pledged for humanitarian efforts in light of rough national economic power, which is arguably a more useful measure. There are a number of caveats that should be kept in mind while reading the table:

1. The figures do not include the cost of operating military resources deployed to provide aid, and it is unclear how this should be quantified. While some would argue that military resources are already paid for and that the relief effort can be regarded as a logistics training exercise, the increased operational costs are an unbudgeted expenditure. Others would argue that the military resources provide the only infrastructure that will deliver aid in a timely manner to save lives to the hardest hit and neediest areas, and without this quickly deployable infrastructure the other contributions, no matter how large would be useless or arrive too late.
2. The figures do not tell anything about the rate in which the money will be spent. How much of the money is going to be spent this year and how much is reserved for long-term reconstructions efforts is not reflected by this table.
3. Use of gross domestic product or gross national product should be treated with caution as this does not accurately measure a country's ability to provide aid. Similarly, whether to use 'nominal' or 'real' GNP/GDPs can be argued. Some GDP/GNP figures are also out of date e.g. for the year 2002, or even 2001, so comparisons between countries may not be for the same time period. A better comparison might be used by examining purchasing power parity-adjusted GDP/GNP figures (as used in the CIA factbook).
4. It can be argued, the quality of aid differs as "aid" is an ambiguous term that may cover a wide variety of methods, including 'soft' loans (where the money has to be repaid with interest albeit at below market rates), and 'tied aid' (where the money has to be spent buying goods and services from the donating country). The terms by which the aid is accepted play a large role in determining how useful it is and also affect the relative cost to the donating country.
5. This is aid for one particular disaster. Without knowing how much aid the various countries and their people donate to other disasters, one cannot draw conclusions on their overall level of generosity.
6. The numbers below are the pledged contributions. Arguably, only funds that are actually transferred should be counted. For example, after the Bam earthquake in December 2003, the Iranian government received only US$17.5 million from the US$1 billion of international donations that had been promised.
7. The amounts pledged by individual member states of the European Union should be increased by amounts pledged by the European Union itself.

With all the caveats in mind, the following table lists some countries in order of nominal aid donated divided by GDP.

Country	GDP (2003 or earlier) (US$ billions) See	Aid (total) (US$ millions)	% of GDP	Aid by government (US$ millions)	% of GDP	Aid by public (US$ millions)	% of GDP
Australia	518.4	1,322	0.255	1,099	0.212	227.6	0.043
Liechtenstein	0.825	1.2	0.145	?	?	?	?
Qatar	17.47	25	0.140	?	?	?	?
Norway	221.6	265.1	0.119	175.3	0.079	89.8	0.040
Netherlands	512	509.1	0.0994	300.5	0.0587	208.6	0.0407
Canada	834.4	743.68	0.089	531.2	0.064	212.48	0.025
Ireland	148.6	117.94	0.079	20	0.0135	97.94	0.0659
Sweden	300.8	230.9	0.077	71.9	0.024	159	0.053
Finland	162	89.5	0.055				
Hong Kong	158.6	85.89	0.054	6.41	0.004	79.48	0.05
Saudi Arabia	188.5	97.5	0.052				
Switzerland	309.5	157.9	0.051				
Denmark	212.4	100.9	0.0475				
Germany	2400	1,071	0.0446				
United Kingdom	1795	795.2	0.0443	140.3	0.0078	654.9	0.036
Taiwan	293.2	110	0.038	50	0.017	60	0.021
United Arab Emirates	70.96	25	0.035				
United States	10,880	2,875	0.026				
Czech Republic	85	19	0.0224				
Belgium	302	65.37	0.0216				
Singapore	91.34	15	0.016				
Greece	173	21.3	0.0123				
Japan	4326	580	0.013	500	0.012	80	0.0018
Spain	836.1	3.713	0.00007				
Italy	1466	120.13	0.0082				
Iceland	10.5	2.5	0.0238				
Portugal	149	10.45	0.0070				
Mainland China	1410	95.07	0.0067				
India	599	183	0.0031				
France	1748	54.84	0.0031				

=== Pledged amounts on a per capita basis ===
– Another way of looking at the figures.

Country	Population (July 2004 or earlier) See	Aid (total) (US$ millions)	per capita (US$)	Aid by government (US$ millions)	per capita (US$)	Aid by public (US$ millions)	per capita (US$)
Australia	19,913,144	1,322	66.38	1,099	55.19	223.4	11.22
Norway	4,574,560	265.1	57.95	175.3	38.32	89.8	19.63
Kuwait	2,257,549	100	44.3				
Liechtenstein	32,528	1.2	36.89				
Netherlands	16,318,199	509.1	31.20	300.5	18.42	208.6	12.78
Ireland	3,939,558	117.94	29.94	20	5.08	97.94	24.86
Qatar	840,290	20	23.80				
Canada	32,507,874	743.68	22.88	531.2	16.34	212.48	6.54
Switzerland	7,450,867	157.9	21.19				
Sweden	9,010,627	230.9	25.63	71.9	7.97	159	17.64
Finland	5,214,512	89.5	17.16				
Denmark	5,413,392	87.5	16.16				
United Kingdom	60,270,708	795.7	13.20	140.3	2.33	654.9	10.87
Hong Kong	6,855,125	85.89	12.529	6.41	0.935	79.48	11.594
Germany	82,424,609	992	12.04				
United States	293,027,571	2,875	9.81				
Iceland	293,966	2.5	8.50				
United Arab Emirates	2,523,915	20	7.92				
Taiwan (ROC)	22,191,087	110	4.96	50	2.25	60	2.71
Japan	127,333,002	580	4.55	500	3.93	80	0.63
Singapore	4,353,893	15	3.45				
Belgium	10,348,276	24.9	2.41				
Italy	58,057,477	125	2.15				
Greece	10,647,529	21.6	2.03				
Czech Republic	10,246,178	19	1.85				
Spain	40,280,780	73.1	1.81				
Saudi Arabia	25,795,938	30	1.16				
Portugal	10,524,145	10.9	1.04				
France	60,424,213	57	0.94				
Mainland China	1,298,847,624	63	0.05				
India	1,065,070,607	23	0.02				

=== Asia Pacific ===
Australia	Federal Government — After committing and distributing to international aid an initial A$10 million pledge (US$7.7 million), the government of Australia announced on 29 and 31 December that two additional disbursements of A$25 million (US$18.1 million) each would be committed: A$10 million to aid organizations, A$10 million to Indonesia, and A$5 million (US$3.6 million) to Sri Lanka. Foreign Affairs Minister Alexander Downer indicated Australia would offer further aid as needed. On 5 January in Jakarta, Prime Minister John Howard announced an Australian aid package of A$1 billion for Indonesia (US$766.89M), significantly exceeding the half billion expected. The bilateral aid package consists equally of grant assistance and highly concessional funding. On 11 January, A$500,000 aid was announced for the Seychelles, taking total federal government monetary assistance to A$1,060,500,000. The World Bank criticized Australia for not being transparent enough and said that only a small part of the money was really for the victims; State governments — The governments of the Australian Capital Territory, New South Wales, the Northern Territory, Queensland, South Australia, Victoria and Western Australia all pledged monetary assistance to a combined total of A$17.45 million (US$13.6 million).; Military/Professional — As part of Australia's aid-assistance, the Australian Defence Force (ADF) worked extensively in the region, alongside American forces. Upwards on 900 unarmed personnel worked in Indonesia, including 15 air-traffic controllers managing the massive aid effort in Aceh. Eight Royal Australian Air Force C-130 Hercules assisted in the massive clean-up in Indonesia. Four Hercules moved stores within Indonesia, while another four planes established an air bridge to move material and personnel from Australia. At the outbreak of the disaster, three were immediately dispatched, laden with essentials such as medical supplies, water purification units, blankets and bottled water. Also, a Royal Australian Navy amphibious transport ship HMAS Kanimbla was dispatched from Sydney on New Year's Eve, to arrive in Indonesia on 13 January, with two H-3 Sea King helicopters on board. Furthermore, four Australian Army UH-1 Iroquois helicopters worked in Aceh, where the ADF established a field hospital and water plant. The Australian Federal Police (AFP) also had teams on the ground, particularly in Thailand, including body identification teams. Teams of medical and emergency professionals were sent with the call going out for volunteers ready and willing to fly to the affected areas to further assist with the relief and rebuilding operation. In response to a request from the Maldivian Government, Australia sent ecological experts to repair coral reefs – the life-blood of Maldivian tourism – and teachers to restore schooling. The estimated cost of this additional support is above A$60 million (US$46.5M), and was being managed by Emergency Management Australia (EMA).; Public/Corporate — Australia's three major commercial television networks, the Seven Network, the Nine Network and Network Ten took the unprecedented step of pooling resources to organise a special concert telethon which aired on 8 January. Simultaneously broadcast on all three networks and in most capitals on the Triple M radio network, the telethon was an extraordinary display of solidarity and co-operation in the usually fiercely competitive commercial television and radio markets (see Australia Unites: Reach Out To Asia). As of the end of the broadcast, the figure raised/pledged was A$15,198,349.53, however phone lines remained open and the final tally totalled at over A$20 million. The overall corporate response has been criticised as inadequate, particularly considering bumper profits. The Australian public raised over at least A$190 million (US$143.37 million). As a sign of respect to the victims of the disaster, New Year's Eve celebrations around the country were either toned down or cancelled. Most of those celebrations that did proceed organised collections for charities in an attempt to avoid criticism. Australia's largest New Year's celebration, in Sydney, alone raised over A$1.1 million for the cause.
Cambodia	The Royal Cambodian Government donated US$40,000 total: US$10,000 each to India, Indonesia, Sri Lanka and Thailand.
China	The Chinese government sent RMB 521.63 million (US$63 million) to South and Southeast Asia. Overall donations from the Chinese public were up to at least over 500 million RMB.
Hong Kong, SAR (PRC)	As of 7 January 2005, citizens of Hong Kong donated a total of HKD 560 million (US$71.8 million) (CRHK, HKET). Hutchison Whampoa Limited and Li Ka Shing Foundation of Hong Kong announced on 28 December 2004 that they would donate HKD 24 million (US$3.08 million) for the relief fund. Performer Karen Joy Morris (aka. Karen Man Wai Mok) pledged to donate HKD 200 thousand (Ming Pao). Performers of EEG also pledged to donate a total sum of HKD 630 thousand. Sir Run Run Shaw has donated HKD 10 m. Hong Kong Jockey Club donated HKD 10 million, and HKD 1 for each dollar it received from donors (target at a minimum HKD 10 m). MTR donated HKD 0.5 for each passenger trip on 2 January 2005, with a total sum at HKD 1 m. KCR donated all the fares collected in the four-hour extension of train services on 1 January 2005. Hong Kong Red Cross collected HKD 100 m (global target US$46 m / HKD 360 m). MSF stopped collected donations for the tsunami, and requested donors to donate to its other programmes. World Vision Hong Kong has collected HKD 50 m. A variety show TV programme on TVB and RTHK on 2 January 2005 collected HKD 40 million (HKET). Various NGOs, companies and individuals set off to the affected countries to offer assistance. The government of Hong Kong sent 120 personnel to help Hong Kong residents and search for missing people. Police and medical teams stood-by to offer assistance. Update: At 3 December 2005, Red Cross Hong Kong has already collected HK$620M.
Macau, SAR (PRC)	Macau Red Cross collected MOP 35 m.
India	Government of India — The federal government pledged INR 1 billion (US$23 million) to Sri Lanka and Maldives in addition to warships and aircraft to distribute relief supplies. A federal budgetary allocation of INR 7 billion (US$160 million) was earmarked for immediate distribution to affected Indian provinces.; Military — As part of India's rescue and aid-assistance, the Indian Navy and the Indian Coast Guard deployed 32 Naval ships, seven aircraft and 20 helicopter in the Indian Ocean region. This was the part of various operations like Operation Madad (in Indian states of Andhra Pradesh and Tamil Nadu coasts), Operation Sea Waves (in Indian territory of Andaman & Nicobar Islands), 'Operation Castor' (in Maldives), 'Operation Rainbow' (on Sri Lanka) and 'Operation Gambhir' (in Indonesia). Also an Indian Naval group was able to start the rescue operations in neighbouring countries within 12 hours from the time of the tsunami and the first foreign navy to reach them.; Public — The citizens of India and various NGOs actively participated in providing relief materials and charity to the tsunami-stricken people.
Japan	The Japanese government provided US$500 million in aid to affected countries. Emergency medical teams were sent to Indonesia, Sri Lanka, Thailand and the Maldives. Japan, which is the world's second-largest donor of Official Development Assistance (known as ODA), also dispatched Japan Self-Defense Forces vessels off Northern Sumatra to supply aid. Land, Air, and Maritime Forces were already ordered preparation.
Malaysia	Malaysia sent rescue teams abroad as local damage was minimal and this freed the Special Malaysian Rescue Team (SMART) to fly to Indonesia. The team 73-member combination unit from SMART, and the Fire and Rescue Department were sent to Medan with food, medicine and clothing for about 2,000 victims. An additional military doctors team in a CN 235 aircraft and a helicopter were also sent to Aceh. Further aid are being sent using C-130 Hercules transport aircraft, a volunteer body for humanitarian relief consisting of doctors and nurses have also flown to Sri Lanka. Currently, it has two teams based in Kesdam Military Hospital, one of the two surviving hospitals in Banda Aceh. Malaysia also has opened its airspace and two airports, Subang Airport and Langkawi International Airport to relief operations and acts as a staging base to forward relief supplies to Aceh.
New Zealand	Government — The New Zealand government announced it will donate NZD10 million (US$7.2 million). On 18 January, the New Zealand Government announced an increase in aid to a total of NZD68 million (US$47.2 million), including its initial NZD10 million commitment. The government's response includes NZD20 million (A$18.4 million) for United Nations relief efforts, NZD20 million (A$18.4 million) for work in Aceh and other parts of Sumatra through a bilateral aid program in Indonesia and a NZD19 million (A$17.5 million) dollar-for-dollar matching of public donations by New Zealanders.; Military — Also, a Royal New Zealand Air Force (RNZAF) C-130 Hercules, working in unison with the Royal Australian Air Force, was sent for evacuation and transport of relief supplies. New Zealand also sent an RNZAF 757 aircraft to Phuket, Thailand with a specialist victim identification team on board. The 38-year-old aircraft was plagued with severe technical difficulties, and on several occasions was forced to halt aid efforts.; Public — The New Zealand government also announced that it would match, dollar for dollar, the amount pledged by its citizens to various charities. As of 18 January 2005, this equated to a further NZD 19 million.
North Korea	The government of North Korea pledged US$150,000.
Pakistan	Government of Pakistan has announced a PKR 10 million (US$0.2 million) relief package for the earthquake victims of Sri Lanka. This consisted of goods such as tents, medicines, drinking water and food items.; Military Pakistan planned to send 500 military personnel in medical and engineering teams to Indonesia and Sri Lanka.; Aeroplanes2 C-130 aeroplanes with relief goods and 250 doctors and engineers left for Indonesia and Sri Lanka each. Six more C-130 would fly to Indonesia in a week to help in the relief work, and two Seaking helicopters onboard PNS (Pakistan Navy Ship) Moawin were in Sri Lanka to provide logistics support.; Navy ships Ships Khyber and Mua'awan were sent to Sri Lanka. On board, these ships had three helicopters, a marine Expeditionary Force, doctors, and paramedics. Besides, relief goods – medicines, medical equipment, food supplies, tents, blankets- were sent in huge quantities. Pakistan Navy ships, Tariq and Nasr, on a good will visit to the Maldives, saved 367 foreign tourists, representing 17 nationalities conducted aerial surveys to judge the extent of damage, distributed food and medicines, and provided medical assistance. Pakistan Navy Task Force arrived at Colombo port to provide humanitarian assistance and relief goods to the government of Sri Lanka. An ISPR (Navy) statement here on Tuesday named the commander of the Task Force as Commodore Ehsan Saeed and it comprised Pakistan Navy ship Moawin, a Logistic support ship having two Seaking helicopters onboard and PNS Khaibar, a guided missile destroyer carrying one Aloutte helicopter. On arrival, officials from Pakistan Mission at Colombo and local Navy officials of Sri Lanka received the ships.; Upon arrival, a co-ordination meeting was held onboard PNS Moawin between Sri Lanka Navy officials, Pakistan High Commissioner to Sri Lanka and Pakistan Navy Mission Commander Commodore Ehsan Saeed to discuss the modus operandi of the relief operations.
Singapore	The Singapore Government pledged S$5 million to relief efforts initially, including S$1 million in cash to the Singapore Red Cross Society. The Singapore humanitarian relief operation, "Operation Flying Eagle", involved more than 1,200 military and civil defence personnel—of whom 900 were in Aceh, Indonesia. The humanitarian assistance provided by its military, medical and rescue teams was estimated to cost S$20 million. Singapore also offered to rebuild hospitals and clinics in Aceh. The Singapore Armed Forces (SAF) deployed three Endurance class landing platform dock ships—RSS Endurance, RSS Persistence and RSS Endeavour—off the coast of Meulaboh, one of the worst-hit areas where all road access was cut off. On board, these ships were medical and engineering teams and volunteers with NGOs. The ships were also loaded with medical supplies and heavy equipment to help clear roads and debris. It also dispatched six Chinook helicopters and two Super Puma helicopters to Aceh, two Chinook helicopters and two Super Puma helicopters to Phuket, Thailand. C130s were also dispatched to ferry relief supplies to tsunami-hit areas.
South Korea	The South Korean Government pledged an additional US$1.4M on 28 December 2004 in addition to an earlier offer of support of US$600,000. A 20-person emergency aid team consisting of 5 medical specialists, nurses and administrative staff was dispatched to Sri Lanka by the Korean Ministry of Health and Welfare and a medical aid group. On 29 December a shipment with medicine and medical supplies worth SKW 200M (US$192,000) followed the team.
Republic of China, Taiwan (ROC)	The ROC government pledged US$50.0M in aid to affected countries. If private philanthropic donations are calculated, relief aid from Taiwan would be expected to reach US$60M. Other forms of humanitarian aid include over 30,000 tons in emergency supplies and 50 medical teams to be dispatched to affected areas.
Tonga	The government of Tonga pledged US$65,000 and the Tongan public donated TOP 22,887.
Vanuatu	Government — The Government of Vanuatu contributed VUV 5,000,000 (US$47,300) to relief efforts.; Public — A benefit concert was held 8 January, which raised VUV 200,000 (US$1,800) for the Vanuatu Red Cross Society (both.

=== Europe ===
Austria	The government wanted to give aid worth €50M (US$65.30M), but only gave €8.9M in the end.
Belgium	Belgian government sent €12M (US$16.4M). Various organisations such as Artsen zonder Grenzen sent medical teams. During the charity show on 14 January 2005, public and private media in Belgium had more than €38M collected.
Bulgaria	The Bulgarian Military Academy of Medicine allocated BGN 200,000 (€100,000) worth of aid to Indonesia and Sri Lanka in the form of medicines and emergency equipment. The Bulgarian Red Cross and the national emergency agency sent emergency equipment, drugs and shelters.
Croatia	The Croatian government decided to allocate HRK 4M (€520,000) for aid to the stricken region (the amount to be split equally between India, Sri Lanka, Indonesia and Thailand). Croatian Red Cross contributed with HRK 4.8M (€630,000) from public donations.
Czech Republic	The Czech government gave aid worth CZK 200M (€6.5M or US$8.7M), in various forms. Public donations add more than CZK 230M, about US$10M. The total makes the country a leading donor from the former Eastern bloc.
Denmark	The Danish government gave aid worth DKR 300 m (€40.38M). Danish PM Anders Fogh Rasmussen said that Denmark would increase this amount if it was deemed necessary by the UN or emergency relief organisations.
Finland	The Finnish government has already delivered €4.5M to help the victims of the tsunami, €5.5M would be given to helping aid organisations when requested. In addition, €75,000 and a field hospital from the Finnish Red Cross and €25,000 from Save the Children Finland would be sent.
France	The Ministry of Foreign Affairs announced on 29 December that €22.16M was being pledged. €15M was allocated to the UN's agencies and Red Cross, while €1.56M should be used for immediate assistance. Another €5.6M part of this sum is the first French participation to the European aid. €20M was pledged on 30 December, mostly for clean water installations. €100,000 was given by the Ministry of Foreign Affairs on 27 December, and a plane with 100 rescue personnel and 800 kg of medical supplies was sent.
Germany	The German government initially allocated €20M (US$26M) for immediate aid. Fast-response teams of the governmental technical relief organisation (THW) were sent to Thailand and Sri Lanka for rescue purposes on 28 December, together with drinking water purification equipment to be installed in Galle (Sri Lanka). Additional water purification equipment was sent to the Maldives and Indonesia on first days 2005. During the last weeks, several medical and supporting units of the German armed forces were sent to the region, including a supporting frigate and medevac airlifts. Australian and German forces joined to build a large-scale field hospital at the scene. The German Chancellor Gerhard Schröder proposed to release the most affected countries from their debts and to create a scheme under which every EU state "adopts" (where one has to note that the German word for adoption or godparenthood has a less demeaning undertone than the English one) one of the most severely affected countries and ensures long-lasting aid. German charities (TV shows, private donations) topped as of 5 January 2005 more than US$400M. Additionally, the German government would give €500M; in a period of 3 to 5 years for long-term-help.
Greece	Greece allocated €0.3M (US$0.4M) to the Maldives and Sri Lanka, and two planes carried to those countries over 6 tonnes of humanitarian materials. The Greek people raised over €15M (US$19.9M) through private donations made during a TV charity marathon which included the auction of articles such as commemorative items from the Athens Olympic Games and the Euro 2004 event, as well as the fountain pen of the retiring President of the Hellenic Republic. The Greek Government added €1M (US$1.3M) to the initial amount.
Hungary	Hungary sent a medical and rescue team of 10 as well as two containers and ten pallets of emergency goods to Thailand and Sri Lanka.
Iceland	The Icelandic government pledged ISK 5M (US$70,000) to the Icelandic Red Cross to "make sure the money gets into the right hands". An aeroplane from Loftleiðir Icelandic (a subsidiary of Flugleiðir) Phuket island departed from Iceland on 28 December 2004 to pick up Swedish survivors. A little under 10 tonnes of Iceland Spring Water manufactured by Ölgerðin Egill Skallagrímsson were also sent. On 7 January the Icelandic government announced that the total contribution to the earthquake disaster in Asia was ISK 150M (US$2.5M).
Ireland	The Irish government pledged €20M (US$26.12M) in response to the earthquake-caused disaster in South Asia – the majority of the money was given to Irish Aid organisations and the UN. In the immediate aftermath of the disaster, the Irish public quickly started collecting money, on the streets, in churches, schools, in shopping centres and many other initiatives such as the Work a Day for Free, where many workers throughout the country donated a days wages to the disaster relief fund. An estimated €1M was raised also by pubs and hotels in collections. Hundreds of other events took place throughout the country. The various Irish charities raised over €75M by 18 March 2005 from the public in response to the disaster with the Irish Red Cross, Concern, and Goal all raising several million each. The church based charity Trócaire alone raised €27M over just one weekend Source: Irish Times 18 March 2005'
Italy	The CEI (Italian Conference of Bishops) sent €100,000 (part of a donation of US$1.7M from Caritas Internationalis) and collected national donations. Private moneyraising efforts coordinated by newspapers and telephony companies have collected more than €12.6M. The government pledged €3M (US$3.9M). As of 31 December five Italian flights had arrived in Sri Lanka carrying an advanced team of eight experts of the Italian Civil Protection Department with fifty tonnes of equipment and goods (two field hospitals, twenty doctors and medical staff, medical kits, field kitchens, water pumps, water storages, etc.)
Luxembourg	The Luxembourg government announced it would donate at least €5M (US$6.5 million) as humanitarian aid.
Macedonia	Macedonia which had one of the weakest European economies at the time allocated €1.5M (US$1.9M) to the areas affected by the disaster. Humanitarian materials were distributed by the Macedonian Red Cross as well as by private companies. Telephone numbers by all operators were open for private donations. Musical happenings and a TV charity marathon by the national broadcaster which included the auction of articles of Macedonian celebrities were also organized. Some of these articles, such as a portrait of the Macedonian Romani music queen, Esma, reached outstandingly high prices for both Macedonian and European standards.
Netherlands	The Dutch government reserved €227M (US$295M) for aid to the affected area. A KDC-10 aircraft of the Dutch Airforce flew several missions to the affected areas, providing emergency supplies and a mobile hospital unit. Military air-traffic-controllers were sent to Banda Aceh to help deal with the stream of relief flights. Also, a specialized forensic identification team helped to find the identities of dozens of Tsunami victims in Thailand. The Dutch Red Cross dedicated €100,000 (US$0.13 million) for emergency aid. Several private initiatives started, which varied from calls to give money to Samenwerkende Hulporganisaties (Giro 555) to collecting food and other supplies for the affected areas. These initiatives have raised €160.5M (US$208.6M).
Norway	The Norwegian government allocated NOK 1.1bn (US$180M) to be distributed to the UN, the Red Cross and other aid organisations. The prime minister also pledged to provide more funds as needed in aid relief coordinated by the United Nations. The Royal Norwegian Air Force and Scandinavian Airlines established airlift shuttles in order to provide emergency transport services between Thailand and Scandinavia for as long as necessary. An appeal to convince the government to provide a total amount of NOK 10 billion (US$1.64bn) from The Petroleum Fund of Norway to this and future disasters.
Poland	The Polish government donated PLN 1M (US$0.3M) to Polish aid non-governmental organisations.
Portugal	The Portuguese government approved €8M (US$10.9M) in aid to victims of the tragedy. The country sent a plane with relief supplies to Sri Lanka, and the Government announced that a second plane with humanitarian aid would be sent in next days, this time to Indonesia.
Romania	The Romanian government approved €150,000 worth of medical aid, tents and beds to South Asia. Additionally, €395,000 was raised by the public in a telethon, bringing the total to €545,500.
Russia	Two transport planes of the Russian Ministry for Emergency Situations landed on Sri Lanka on 27 December carrying humanitarian aid. The planes were carrying 110 tents and 2200 blankets with a total weight of 25 tonnes, Russia also sent a rescue helicopter Bo-105, on board of which rescuers flew over the area of the calamity and searched for and evacuated people. One more plane was sent on 30 December with tents, drinking water, water cleaning stations and other humanitarian aid. The town of Beslan, scene of the 2004 school hostage crisis, donated RUB 1M (US$36,000) from the fund set up after the mass hostage-taking. On 11 January Russia sent field hospital equipment to Indonesia. Nearly 150 tons of humanitarian aid were flown to Sri Lanka, Thailand and Indonesia from 27 December to 10 January 2005. The humanitarian cargoes, part of them supplied by Belarus, included tents, blankets, bedding, water purification installations and flour.
Serbia	The Serbian government approved immediate delivery of 40 tonnes of humanitarian aid worth €150,000. Two Aviogenex airplanes were provided for the delivery. The Exit Music Festival collected 317,000 L of water from sponsors. Serbian Red Cross started to collect money.
Slovenia	The Slovenian government approved SIT 44M (€185,500) for immediate delivery.
Spain	Central Government The Spanish Cabinet approved an aid package totalling €54M (US$70.5M): €4M (US$5.2M) for immediate delivery, allocated to the relief shipments conducted by the Spanish Agency of International Cooperation (AECI) and NGOs; and €50M Development Aid Fund (FAD) loan, with favourable terms to include long periods of repayment and low interest, aimed to support the reconstruction efforts in all countries affected by the quake. Two cargo planes with humanitarian aid took off on 28 December to Sri Lanka and another three, of the AECI and the Red Cross, were dispatched on 31 December to Sumatra in Indonesia and Thailand. The Government also announced a debt moratorium for affected countries.; Military On 8 January Prime Minister José Luis Rodríguez Zapatero announced the immediate deployment of a military force to assist in humanitarian tasks, comprising 650 troops, 5 planes with humanitarian aid, 2 helicopters and a hospital-ship. The military mission was to last two months, and would focus on Sumatra and expected cost was €6.5M.; Regional and local Governments Several Governments of the Autonomous communities approved their particular aid packages for urgent delivery: Galicia (€500,000), Madrid (€300,000), Basque Country, (€150,000), Andalusia (€150,000), Land of Valencia (€150,000), Balearic Islands (€150,000), Castile-La Mancha (€140,000), Catalonia (€130,000) and La Rioja (€66,000). The donations of regional governments and local councils amounted to €2M.
Sweden	SEK 500M (US$75M) was to be distributed through SIDA, the Swedish International Development Agency. An extensive relief effort on behalf of the government was engaged including military personnel, forensic teams, search and rescue teams as Sweden is probably the nation not directly affected by the tsunami to be hardest hit. The Swedish public also supplied NGOs with money to an uprecedented (about SEK 500M (or US$75M)), as well as materials such as clothes and other equipment. Swedish media criticised the government for not doing enough for their nationals and for others as the government took days to grasp the severity of the situation.
Switzerland	The Swiss government allocated CHF 27M (US$23.8M). Four teams of the Swiss Humanitarian Aid Unit (SDC) were deployed in India, Sri Lanka and Thailand. Another team of SHA and WHO doctors and logisticians worked on the Maldives. Operation SUMA: 3 "Super Puma" helicopters and 50 personnel were sent by the Swiss army to Sumatra under the guidance of the UNHCR. Various relief organisations contributed CHF 1M. The ongoing appeal for donations organised by resulted in CHF 160M being collected (as of 15 January 2005).
United Kingdom	Government — The British government announced an increase in its aid to £75M on 10 January 2005, up from the £50M (US$96M) pledged on 30 December 2004, and the initial pledge of £15M of aid in the early stages. The government also promised to match the public donation. As president of the G8, the British government and then-Chancellor Gordon Brown pushed for the suspension of debt repayments to the industrialised nations.; Military — The government has also sent the Royal Fleet Auxiliary ship RFA Diligence, the Royal Navy frigate HMS Chatham with Lynx helicopters to move supplies, and a RAF C-17 Globemaster III and a Tristar strategic airlifter.; Public — By the end of 6 January 2005 the total from British citizens stood at £100M (US$190M) who responded by donating at a rate of up to £1M per hour in the first week. — On 26 February 2005, it was announced that the Disasters Emergency Committee (an umbrella organisation of 12 aid agencies) were closing their appeal after raising a total of £300M in the two months since the disaster struck. Other British charities raised a total of £50M.; Corporate/Notable — Large donations were also made by HM The Queen, and other notable celebrities and wealthy individuals. Half of the FTSE 100 companies announced sizeable donations of money/resources, with many other companies donating their services and resources at no cost.
Vatican City	The Pope authorised the immediate release of US$6M, to be delivered to the International Red Cross, for use in the humanitarian relief effort.

=== Middle East and Africa ===
Iran	Iran sent 221 tonnes of relief supplies consisting of medicine, tents, blankets, clothes and foodstuff to Indonesia as well as donating US$675,000 through the Red Crescent.
Israel	The Israeli government sent supplies worth US$100,000 to each affected country. In addition, an Israeli medical team was dispatched to Sri Lanka, and 150 IDF doctors and rescue and relief teams were mobilised for the region with 82-tonnes of aid including 9 tonnes of medicine, nearly 4,000 L of mineral water, 12 tonnes of food, over 17 tonnes of baby food, 10,000 blankets, tents, sheeting, as well as power generators. An additional offer of assistance to India in the form of search and rescue teams from their Home Front Command as well as food and medicine was also extended, and the Israeli Ministry of Health was dispatched to Thailand on medical mission. Bodies identifiers from ZAKA and the Israeli police were also sent.
Kuwait	The Kuwaiti government donated KWD 3M (US$10M) as humanitarian aid.
Morocco	The Moroccan Foreign Ministry has said that aid, consisting of medical supply, vaccines and blankets, would be dispatched to Indonesia, Sri Lanka, India, Thailand, Malaysia, and the Maldives.
Mozambique	The Mozambique government gave a "symbolic" US$100,000 to an aid appeal, and encouraged businesses and individuals to donate to accounts set up by the local Red Cross.
Oman	Oman sent relief goods worth US$3M for the victims of tsunami in Sri Lanka, Maldives and Indonesia. Ali Ibrahim Shanoon Al-Raisi, executive director of Oman Charitable Organization (OCC), the country's Red Crescent, said four consignments carrying 300 tonnes of goods each had already been flown to Sri Lanka and Maldives in three days during January 2005.
Qatar	Qatar offered US$25M, plus food, medical and logistical supplies.
Saudi Arabia	Saudi Arabia pledged a US$30M aid package consisting of US$5M worth of food, tents and medicine, to be transported and distributed via the Saudi Red Crescent and another US$5 million in funds to be given to several international aid groups such as the Red Cross and the UN High Commissioner for Refugees.
South Africa	The South African government's official financial contribution to tsunami relief consisted of coordinated aid to the Maldives. This included the sending of a freighter with South African helicopters and crew, as well as emergency supplies. The Maldives was selected because, according to Sydney Mufamadi, on behalf of the South African government, 'it was impossible to confirm the full extent of the damage as hardly any emergency rescue effort had taken place on the islands'. South Africans themselves have donated an amount of US$2.6 million in cash and more than 280 tons of food to tsunami relief efforts. Most of these donations have been channeled via the International Red Cross. Updated / checked: 23 February 2005
Syria	A Syrian aeroplane loaded with 40 tonnes of medical and food aid took off from Damascus Airport to Indonesia Thursday. The Syrian government newspaper Al-Thawra quoted Syria's Health Minister, Maher al-Hussami, as saying that the load included 20 tonnes of medicine, food and drinking water, as well as 880 blankets
Tunisia	The Tunisian government sent 2 C-130s to Indonesia full of relief supplies.
Turkey	Turkey donated TRY 28.9M (US$37.6M) so far, to be used in reconstruction projects and be allocated to Sri Lanka, India, Indonesia, Thailand, Malaysia and Maldives.
United Arab Emirates	US$20M and 30 tonnes of food and medicine in the care of the Red Crescent, was to be delivered to India, Indonesia and Sri Lanka.

=== Americas ===
Brazil	The Brazilian government was waiting on a UN decision for joint humanitarian aid. In the meantime, initial emergency aid of 10 tonnes of food and 8 tonnes of medicine were delivered to Thailand and India by the Brazilian Air Force. In the country, private citizens and small businesses organised a national effort to collect food, medicine and clothes for the populations affected. In Rio de Janeiro, 70 tonnes donated in the city alone by locals, were delivered on 2 January to the Consul of Sri Lanka. Many more tonnes were handed to the local embassies and consulates of the countries affected.
Canada	Federal Government: The Canadian government pledged, as of 10 January 2005, C$425M (US$344.96M), an increase to the original figure of C$4M offered by the federal government, which had previously been revised to 40M and then to 80M, as an immediate contribution toward the aid effort and would also be providing blankets, water purification devices, and generators through the Canadian International Development Agency (CIDA).; The Canadian government would also match private donations received by 11 January 2005; according to CIDA, this represented an additional C$200M.; The Canadian federal government also announced a debt moratorium for the countries most severely affected by the tsunami. Also, Canada has announced it will send its DART (Disaster Assistance Response Team) to Ampara in Sri Lanka.; Provincial Governments: In addition to the federal funds, the provincial government of British Columbia has given C$8M (US$6.6M) to the Canadian Red Cross, the provincial governments of Ontario and Alberta have each pledged C$5M (US$4.1M), the provincial governments of Quebec, Manitoba, New Brunswick, Newfoundland and Labrador, and Nova Scotia have each given C$100,000 (US$82,000), and the provincial governments of the Northwest Territories and Prince Edward Island have pledged C$25,000 and 20,000 respectively.; Private Sector: Measuring the extent of individual and corporate philanthropy is more difficult, although the government estimated that donations to tsunami victims reached more than C$230M, with 200M of this available for matching. The federal government created incentives for private donations: it announced that it would match donations dollar-for-dollar and decided to bend the rules by allowing tsunami-related donations made before 11 January 2005 to be claimed on 2004 income-tax returns.; On 7 January CBC announced plans for a tsunami benefit concert on 13 January. Canadian music performers included Avril Lavigne, Tom Cochrane, Blue Rodeo, Neil Young, Bryan Adams, Anne Murray, Rush, Molly Johnson, Oscar Peterson, Jann Arden, Simple Plan, Sum 41, Barenaked Ladies, Three Days Grace, Bruce Cockburn, and among others, in a special segment direct from her Las Vegas stage venue, Céline Dion. In addition, non-musical celebrities ranged from author Margaret Atwood to sports commentator Don Cherry to Bubbles of the Trailer Park Boys. Ron MacLean and Rick Mercer would serve as co-hosts.; Military Canada's Canadian Forces Disaster Assistance Response Team was sent to Sri Lanka.
Chile	The Chilean government sent a group of four doctors, one engineer and one architect to Indonesia on 1 January 2005 and would remain there for twenty days. In addition, it opened a special bank account for public donations.
Mexico	The Mexican federal government pledged an aid package of US$1,100,000 (MXN 12,000,000). Search teams, known as Topos, were dispatched by the Ministry of Foreign Affairs (SRE); these teams are experienced in earthquake rescue operations and could be helpful in the rescue of trapped and buried victims. The Mexican armed forces sent a hospital ship, other vessels, and helicopters. The Mexican Red Cross also invited Mexican citizens to give aid which was distributed amongst local agencies.
United States	Federal Government: The United States government allocated US$400,000 (£200,000, €300,000) to India, Indonesia, the Maldives, Sri Lanka and Thailand. Officials worked on a US$4M (£2M) aid package to help the Red Cross. Also, the United States dispatched disaster teams to aid the nations affected. The United States also prepared an initial US$15 million (£8M) aid package for affected nations. An additional US$20M (£11M) was offered as an emergency line of credit. On 31 December the aid was raised to US$350M (£190M, €260M).: Military: The United States dispatched numerous C-5 Galaxy and C-17 Globemaster III strategic airlifters and ten C-130 Hercules tactical airlifters containing disaster supplies, nine P-3C Orion maritime patrol aircraft for search and rescue support, and several teams from the Departments of State and Defense to coordinate additional assistance. They used Utapao Naval Air Base in Thailand as their regional hub.; Additionally, the United States offered assistance from its troops stationed in Japan. USS Abraham Lincoln aircraft carrier battle group, which was in port in Hong Kong, was dispatched to the coast of Sumatra to provide support to the Indonesian province of Aceh. In addition, an Expeditionary Strike Group led by USS Bonhomme Richard, scheduled for a port call in Guam, were dispatched to render assistance.; A total of 48 Navy and Marine Corps helicopters were involved. Each ship can produce around 90,000 US gallons (340,000 L) of fresh water per day. The US Navy also deployed the USNS Mercy, a 1,000-bed hospital ship (to be initially staffed to support 250 patient beds). More than 12,600 Department of Defense personnel were involved in the relief effort, Operation Unified Assistance.; Private Sector: As of 10 January 2005 US based relief groups and non-governmental organisations reported having raised over US$515M. One charity said online pledges were arriving at a rate of US$100,000 an hour. Notable donors include American corporations; among them the Coca-Cola Company (US$10M), Dow Chemical Company (US$5M), The New York Stock Exchange Foundation (US$1M), Microsoft Corporation (US$3M), and Dell (US$3M initial, up to $5M through employee fundraising).; Pharmaceutical companies such as Pfizer, Johnson & Johnson, and Bristol-Myers Squibb have provided medical supplies and drugs in addition to monetary assistance. Hollywood celebrities also donated, including Clint Eastwood, Matt Damon, Tom Hanks, Dennis Quaid, Steven Spielberg, Sandra Bullock, and among others. American rock bands also donated, including Metallica, Green Day, Blink-182, Linkin Park, Incubus, Korn, Deftones, Papa Roach, P.O.D., Switchfoot, Hoobastank, System of a Down, and among others. Private American citizens, communities, and schools also began fundraising efforts and contributed.; US President George W. Bush donated US$16,000 from his personal funds; the city of Fargo, North Dakota gave US$10,000 of taxpayer money; and motorists in Chattanooga, Tennessee were allowed to donate money to the relief effort in place of paying for traffic citations. President Bush also called for a nationwide fundraising drive, headed by 2 former Presidents George H. W. Bush (his father) and Bill Clinton; former First Lady Hillary Clinton, U.S. Secretary of Defense Donald Rumsfeld, and ordered American flags to fly at half-staff "as a mark of respect for the victims of the Indian Ocean Earthquake and the resulting Tsunamis".

== Contributing non-governmental organisations (NGOs) ==
The income of non-governmental organisations and multilateral organisations is derived from many sources, including earned revenues, grants, philanthropic donors, corporations, governments and other groups. For example, the African Union's contribution is financed by its member states. The following "contributions" may be viewed as either a diversion of funds originally earmarked for other purposes or increased donations to the contributing organisation.

ADRA	Silver Spring, Maryland—The Adventist Development and Relief Agency (ADRA) continued its response in India, Thailand, Indonesia, Sri Lanka and the Andaman Islands to assist those affected by the quake and tsunami. ADRA set up a crisis command center in Bangkok, Thailand to coordinate its network-wide response. ADRA International urgently solicited emergency donations for this response. To rapidly respond to this disaster only monetary donations were accepted at the time. Donations could be made to the Asia Tsunami Crisis Fund online or by calling 800-424-ADRA (2372). See more information at.
African Union	The African Union Commission Chairman Alpha Oumar Konaré announced that the organisation would put forward US$100,000 towards disaster relief.
American Friends Service Committee	Building on AFSC programmes and contacts in Asia, AFSC provided relief and planning longer-term recovery, particularly to those who might be overlooked by other agencies or relief programmes.
American Jewish Committee	The AJC established a Tsunami Relief Fund, and initially allocated US$60,000 out of its own account. It subsequently raised an additional US$450,000. AJC chapters around the United States reached out to South Asian religious and ethnic organisations in their communities to help organise memorial services, fundraising events, and public expressions of solidarity. AJC's office in Mumbai (formerly Bombay) assisted in the relief efforts in India, aided by Dr David Elcott of AJC's New York staff. David Elcott and his wife, Rabbi Shira Milgrom were in India at the time of the tsunami visiting their daughter, Liore Milgrom-Elcott, who was volunteering nearby through AJWS.
American Jewish Joint Distribution Committee	The American Jewish Joint Distribution Committee (JDC) collected more than US$2M in individual contributions to the organisation's non-sectarian South Asia Tsunami Relief mailbox.
American Jewish World Service	With US$3.25 million raised, The American Jewish World Service focussed efforts on providing direct material relief to the poorest families in affected areas, including providing food, water storage containers, cooking supplies, blankets and temporary shelters and partnering with Direct Relief International to provide immediate shipments of basic medical supplies, water purification materials and oral rehydration therapies to the heavily affected communities in India and Sri Lanka.
Buddhist Tzu-Chi Foundation of Toronto	The Buddhist Compassion Relief Tzu-Chi Foundation of Toronto, held a number of ongoing fundraising events throughout the city. Volunteers focussed on the Asian communities in the Greater Toronto Area. All money raised would be 100% donated to the affected area without administration fee.
Catholic Relief Services	CRS mounted one of the largest responses in its history – a $190-million, five-year relief and reconstruction effort that would help more than 600,000 people. CRS had more than 350 employees working in the hardest-hit areas in India, Indonesia and Sri Lanka.
ChildFund	Known as the Christian Children's Fund at the time, ChildFund provided relief through distribution of food, water and nutrition supplements. Non-food items such as tents, medicine, hygiene products, clothing, mats and bedding, cooking and eating utensils, and first aid kits were also provided. As a part of the recovery process for children and youth severely impacted by the tsunami, CCF established more than 255 'Child Centered Spaces' in Sri Lanka, India, and Indonesia.
The Church of Jesus Christ of Latter-day Saints (LDS Church)	Providing various forms of assistance. Providing US$31.1M in cash and materials
Direct Relief	Direct Relief had supplied 4.6 million courses of treatment of specifically requested medicines, supplies, and medical equipment (wholesale value: $45.5 million) provided through 68 shipments to India, Indonesia, Sri Lanka, and Somalia. Additionally, the organization furnished $11.8 million in cash grants to locally based clinics and hospitals.
Médecins Sans Frontières	Dispatched 32 tonnes of relief supplies to Sumatra. Medical and assessment teams were sent to many of the affected areas.
Emergency Architects Foundation	Architects, engineers and planners provided professional expertise to the affected populations in Indonesia and Sri Lanka, particularly assisting in the reconstruction of schools.
European Union	The EU provided immediate emergency aid of €3M (US$4.1M) for victims to meet "initial vital needs", with more substantial aid (€30M) to be provided later. This is separate from contributions by individual member countries.
FIRST	The Fast Israeli Rescue and Search Team headed a search and rescue mission to Tamil Nadu, India.
FOCUS	Focus Humanitarian Assistance (FOCUS), an agency affiliated with the Aga Khan Development Network, mobilised staff, volunteers and resources in the state of Andhra Pradesh in India. FOCUS supplemented aid provided by the Government and other organizations through the distribution of food kits comprising rice, lentils, oil and other nutrients. In addition, non-food items such as blankets, tarpaulins, bed sheets, ground sheets, towels, kitchen utensils and clothing were distributed to just under 4000 people. FOCUS also donated 170 tents, 200 torches, 800 battery cells, 220 blankets and 20,000 litres of drinking water to the Andaman and Nicobar Islands.
Hadassah	The Women's Zionist Organization of America announced mobilising of its medical staff from the Hadassah Medical Center in Jerusalem to provide aid and forensic services in Sri Lanka.
Humanity First	Humanity First quickly raised over £1.5M and set up food distribution points and medical centres in India, Sri Lanka, and the Banda Aceh province of Indonesia, which had been the nearest and worst hit. HF established a camp at Lamno, in Banda Aceh province that immediately helped 3,000 people. A combination of medical treatment and the provision of safe water got these people out of danger. Mandays of initial response lasted over 15,000 days and initial response itself lasted for 5 months and long-term development projects were established.
International Federation of Red Cross and Red Crescent Societies	In Geneva the IFRCS appealed for CHF 7.5M (about US$6.6M) for "immediate support" to an estimated 500,000 survivors.
IRW	Islamic Relief Worldwide increased its emergency appeal to US$5M. This includes an initial US$270,650 for relief and rehabilitation intervention in the region, and US$27,000 to meet the immediate needs of victims in Sri Lanka.
Kindhearts	Kindhearts for Charitable Humanitarian Development had representatives in the region providing various forms of assistance. Kindhearts collected donations for its Indonesian relief operations.
Latet	The non-governmental Israeli Humanitarian Aid organisation, Latet ("to give"), dispatched a jumbo plane to Sri Lanka with 18 tonnes of equipment and sent an aid delegation to Thailand.
Lions Clubs International	An initial US$170,000 from the Lions Clubs International Foundation was distributed through Lions clubs in the affected areas in the first days of the disaster. A further 50,000 in emergency grants and 250,000 for longer term aid has since been distributed. LCIF subsequently allocated 10 million dollars towards the relief efforts. Other pledges of support received included US$120,000 from the Lions of Sweden and 200,000 from the Lions of Korea. All money raised by Lions was distributed without any administration costs taken out.
Magen David Adom	The Israeli "Red Cross" dispatched over 4,000 much-needed vials of Albumin by air on 29 December, in order to relieve the casualties of a devastated Sri Lanka.
Mennonite Central Committee	Responded with more than US$15 million in immediate and long term assistance They completed their disaster response in Indonesia in July 2008 after spending US$10 million for recovery in Aceh
Medical Institute of Tamils	Provided urgent medical assistance.
Mercy Corps	Within days of the tsunami, Mercy Corps rushed emergency responders and relief supplies to the devastated coastal region of Aceh, Indonesia – the closest landmass to the epicenter of the quake. Mercy Corps delivered emergency food to over 288,000 survivors, hygiene supplies to more than 253,000, and building materials to construct more than 500 temporary shelters. Cash-for-work programs cleared debris from over 13,000 hectares of public and agricultural land and 50 kilometers of road, and got money flowing back into the decimated local economy.
Oxfam	In India, Oxfam directed its aid to four regions including the communities of Cuddalore, Nagapattinam, Kanyakumari, and along the southwest coast of Kerala. The agency put together a US$13.3M plan to provide immediate relief for people in those regions as well as offer them longer-term assistance to help rebuild their lives and livelihoods. The plan included digging latrines, repairing water sources, and providing temporary shelter for up to 60,000 people, as well as distributing essential household items such as soap, buckets, and coconut oil. In Sri Lanka, Oxfam was appointed as a key organisation to provide clean water and sanitation facilities in the northern part of the country. Staff members in four field offices in Trincomalee, Vavuniya, Batticaloa, and Kilinochchi have been offering immediate help to the communities around them including providing medical and rescue assistance, shelter materials, food, and water tanks. With its partners, Oxfam undertook detailed assessments of the needs in northern, eastern, and southern districts of the country. Additionally, the agency established a new base in the south—in Matara. In Indonesia, Oxfam and UNICEF were appointed the lead providers of clean water in Banda Aceh and its surrounding district. A provincial capital located on the northern tip of Sumatra, Banda Aceh was one of the areas hardest hit by the tsunami and emerged as a coordination centre.
The Peace Fund (P.E.A.C.E.)	The organization established The Phi Phi Island Tsunami Relief Fund (PPITRF) which provides aid to the entire Phi Phi Island; and The Krabi Relief Fund which cares for the orphans of the disaster.
Save the Children USA	Along with nearly US$25M raised thus far, Save the Children USA focused on protecting the most vulnerable disaster victims, children, who faced risks in locations where bonded labour, forced military recruitment and sexual exploitation of them take place. By setting up safe areas consisting of necessities and recreation in Sri Lanka and Indonesia, Save the Children USA is working to interview, identify, register, and reunite children who have been separated from their parents.
United Jewish Communities, Toronto	Just 24 hours after UJA Federation of Greater Toronto opened its Tsunami Relief Fund, the fund had raised more than C$150,000 from over 500 donors. Later, surpassing C$500,000, the UJC of Toronto focussed their efforts on the International Rescue Committee for the ongoing delivery of relief supplied for the Aceh province of Indonesia, the Disaster Mitigation Institute and Carita, Catholic Relief, for delivery of food, clothes and shelter in Chennai, India, the coordination from their Mumbai office to work with the local Jewish community with field activities, and the Chabad Lubavitch Organization to provide medical help, meals and clothing in Thailand and the Chabad volunteer campaign in the region's hospitals.
United Jewish Association, Federation of New York	In addition to helping fund the JDC collection, the UJA of New York commissioned two quarter-page ads in the New York Times, raising at least US$500,000 in support of South Asian Tsunami victims.
UNHCR	The UNHCR in Sri Lanka is opening up its local relief stockpiles to deliver immediate emergency assistance.
UN World Food Programme	Emergency food rations delivered to over one million survivors in first 20 days of crisis, including 750,000 people in Sri Lanka. Using every possible means of transport, from landing craft to trucks, WFP moved a total 10,000 metric tons of food to Indonesia, Sri Lanka, Maldives, Myanmar, Somalia and Thailand.
UNICEF	Clothing and more than 30,000 blankets and sleeping mats to Sri Lanka; 1,600 water tanks, 30,000 blankets, medical supplies and hundreds of thousands of water purification pills to India; Similar supplies to Indonesia and the Maldives.
United Nations Development Programme	US$100,000 each to Sri Lanka, India, Indonesia, the Maldives and Thailand to help them assess and coordinate emergency needs.
United Nations Joint Logistics Centre	The UNJLC complements and co-ordinate logistics capacities of co-operating humanitarian agencies during large-scale and complex emergencies. UNJLC was activated for the Tsunami crisis with the main office in Bangkok, a back-stop office in Rome, an air hub (staging head) in Malaysia and UNJLC cells covering the crisis region, and also based in Indonesia, Sri Lanka and Malaysia.
United Nations Population Fund	Up to US$1M and extra staff to help ensure that the special health needs of pregnant and nursing women were met.
Ve'ahavta	The Canadian Jewish Humanitarian and Relief Commission, Ve'ahavta ("You Shall Love"), collected donations to be used to send more search and rescue personnel and logisticians, facilitate emergency feeding stations, and assist in the financing of other necessary relief items.
World Jewish Aid	The aim of the aid given by World Jewish Aid is to help people survive. As the situation deteriorated water contamination and disease threatened the lives of the survivors. The British group, initially providing £25,000, worked with partners on the ground in India, Indonesia and other affected areas so to realise where their aid should be directed best.
World Vision	World Vision completed the final stage of its three-year Asia Tsunami Response (Indonesia, India, Sri Lanka, Thailand). The US$346.5 million-organization's largest relief effort-program encompassed emergency relief, community rehabilitation (including child-focused programs), livelihood recovery, and infrastructure rehabilitation. Gender, protection, conflict sensitivity, HIV/AIDS and advocacy were cross-cutting components of World Vision's response.

== Contributing corporations ==
A much more complete list of American corporate donations may be found at .

Pfizer	US$35M ($10M cash; $25M medicines)
Deutsche Bank	€10M (US$13M)
Coca-Cola	US$10M
Bristol-Myers Squibb	US$5M ($1M cash; $4M medicines)
ExxonMobil	US$5M
Abbott Laboratories	US$4M ($2M cash; $2M medicine)
Microsoft	US$3.5M
BP	US$3M
Citigroup	US$3M
JPMorgan Chase	US$3M
Shell	US$3M
UBS	US$3M
Cisco	US$2.5M
AIG/The Starr Foundation	US$2.5M
Wal-Mart Stores	US$2M
DaimlerChrysler	US$2M
Johnson & Johnson	US$2M + medicines
Vodafone	£1M (US$1.95M)
Tetra Laval	US$1.5M (including provision of liquid foods)
Bank of America	US$1.5M
Deutsche Telekom	€1M (US$1.4M)
Siemens	€1M
Allianz	€1M
BASF	€1M
AXA	€1M
ChevronTexaco	US$1.24M
Infosys	INR 50M (US$1.1M)
Altana	€750,000 (US$1M)
Boeing	US$1M
ConocoPhillips	US$1M
IBM	US$1M
Nike	US$1M
PepsiCo	US$1M + soft drinks + water
Merrill Lynch	US$1M
American Express	US$1M
Walt Disney Company	US$1M
General Electric	US$1M
First Data Corporation (parent company of Western Union Money Transfer)	$1M
General Motors	US$1M
HSBC	US$1M
Verizon Communications	US$1M
ING	US$1M
Qantas	A$1M + flights page detailing the response by Qantas.
Cable & Wireless	US$1M page detailing the response by Cable & Wireless.
Dhiraagu (The Maldives' national telecommunications company)	US$1M (also noted on page detailing the response by Cable & Wireless.)
Bayer	€500,000 (US$700,000)
Tesco	£310,000 (US$604,500) plus £2.8M (US$5.46M) in customer and staff donations and food, water and shelter materials
Nestlé	CHF640,000 (US$560,000)
The Home Depot	US$500,000
Texas Instruments	US$500,000
Carrefour	€300,000 (US$420,000)
Hitachi	JPY 20M (US$200,000)
Hewitt Associates	US$200,000
Altria	US$150,000
Independent News & Media	€100,000
MTR Corporation	HKD 0.5 per passenger trip on 2 January 2005; Projected goal: HKD 1M (roughly US$128,000).
Marubeni America Corporation	US$10,000
Kowloon-Canton Railway Corporation	All fares collected during the 4-hour extension service on 1 January 2005 morning.
Fonterra	Milk powder and infant formula throughout the region
Wing on Travel	Tour guides set off to affected areas to offer assistance and translation services.
National Hockey League	US$100,000+.
Bell Canada	CDN 175,000 + 1:1 matching donation against employees donations.
Tim Hortons	CDN 1 million through customer donations to UNICEF.

== Fundraising events ==
There were numerous large-scale fundraising events with hundreds of participants around the world.

=== World Cricket Tsunami Appeal ===
Two of the nations most affected by the tsunami, India and Sri Lanka, are leading cricket-playing nations. The International Cricket Council has launched the World Cricket Tsunami Appeal to raise funds for the humanitarian effort. The highlight of this was a two-match One Day International series between a World XI and an Asian XI.

It has been reported on Cricinfo that the first of these matches raised A$8.4 million.

Other matches, such as those in late January 2005 between the New Zealand national team and a World XI also had fundraising as a primary aim.

=== Other events ===
- MTV Asia Aid by MTV Thailand for tsunami victims.
- Australia Unites: Reach Out To Asia, a simulcast telethon.
- UK Radio Aid, a fundraising radio show on over 200 British stations
- Tsunami Relief Cardiff, a charity concert, at the Millennium Stadium in Cardiff, Wales, United Kingdom
- WaveAid in Sydney, Australia
- IRB Rugby Aid Match, a rugby union match between Northern Hemisphere and Southern Hemisphere selections played on 5 March 2005 at Twickenham in London
- Football for Hope, a FIFA-sponsored football (soccer) match played between a World XI and a European XI on 15 February 2005 at Camp Nou, Barcelona.
- Village Earth Press documents recovery efforts in Thailand and the U.S. Gulf Coast
- A concert by Sting at Leeuwin Estate in Western Australia raised $4 million for the relief efforts.
- Tears in Heaven by Tsunami Relief
- Tsunami Soccer Aid, a pro-celebrity football match at Anfield organised by Jason McAteer and featuring a team of Liverpool legends.

== See also ==
- 2004 Indian Ocean earthquake
- Tsunami Evaluation Coalition
- Hurricane Andrew
- Hurricane Katrina
- Humanitarian response to the 2010 Haiti earthquake
