= Jo Beth Taylor =

Australian television presenter and singer

- Born: Joanne Rebecca Guilfoyle; 29 May 1971 (age 55); Perth, Western Australia
- Years active: 1984–present
- Spouses: Jamie Jardine (married 1992–97); Thomas Muster (married 2000–05)
- Children: 1

Joanne Rebecca Guilfoyle (born 29 May 1971), known professionally as Jo Beth Taylor, is an Australian television presenter, actress and singer. She hosted three weekly programs at the same time in the 1990s on the Nine Network: Australia's Funniest Home Video Show (1993–1997), Hey Hey It's Saturday (1995–1997) and What's Up Doc? (1996–1997), before taking a hiatus from television for more than two years.

Upon her return, Taylor hosted StarStruck (2000), which was to be her last regular role until Dirty Jobs (2007). During the 1990s, Taylor also had a music career with the release of an album and four singles, and had starring stage roles in musical theatre. In recent years, Taylor has appeared on reality television programs Dancing with the Stars (2010) and I'm a Celebrity...Get Me Out of Here! (2016).

== Career ==
=== 1984–1992 ===
Taylor began singing at the age of five and performed professionally on the television programme Perth's Young Entertainers at the age of 13 in 1984. At the age of 15 she released a music video Running For Our Lives and in 1988 joined a band named Street Cafe and played regularly around Perth. Taylor moved to Melbourne in 1989 and recorded a demo tape, which was seen by Molly Meldrum, who signed her to Melodian Records. When Taylor signed her record contract Meldrum suggested she change her name to Jo Beth as Joanne "wasn't good".

In 1990, Taylor toured with Indecent Obsession as the support act for Debbie Gibson. After becoming friends, Gibson invited Taylor to go to New York City, where she then lived for a year. During this time Gibson wrote and produced five tracks on Taylor's debut album 99 Reasons. While in New York Taylor also worked with Jelly Benetez who produced five tracks on her album.

Taylor moved back to Australia and released her first single "99 Reasons" in 1991. The song hit the Australian Top 40, peaking at No. 31 and spending 9 weeks in the Top 50. Taylor's debut album was also titled 99 Reasons, however it failed to reach the top 100. "You Don't Own Me" was released as the second and final single from the album and was not a commercial success, charting at No. 137 on the ARIA Chart. Taylor was nominated for Best New Talent at the ARIA Awards in 1992.

=== 1993–1997 ===
A new track titled "A Prayer For Jane", penned by Steve Kipner who worked with Olivia Newton-John and Tina Turner, was released as a single in 1993. Taylor wrote the song about a friend who had taken their own life. The song reached No. 61 on the Australian Charts.

In February 1993, Taylor took over the hosting role of the top-rating Nine Network program Australia's Funniest Home Video Show. This made Taylor not only the sole woman to be hosting a prime-time show in Australia, but at just 22 years old she was also the youngest person. Taylor also sang the shows opening theme song, titled "The Funny Things You Do". Throughout 1995 and 1996 Taylor also starred in the stage shows Cinderella and The New Rocky Horror Show.

In 1995, whilst still hosting on Funniest Home Videos Taylor earned the role of co-host on the long running variety program Hey Hey It's Saturday following the departure of Ernie Carroll's Ossie Ostrich. On a number of occasions Taylor would host the entire show by herself, when Daryl Somers was away. Taylor would regularly perform music on the program. She was with the team when they celebrated their 25th Anniversary of the show at Disneyworld.

1996 saw Taylor make a brief return to music with the release of "I Love My Dog", a single for the 101 Dalmatians Movie soundtrack; reaching No. 95 on the ARIA chart. During this time, Taylor hosted a number of specials for the Nine Network, including the Vision for a Better World Telethon and the 40 Years of Television special which was filmed on the set of Taylor's sometime day job, What's Up Doc?.

In mid-1997 Taylor's time as host on Funniest Home Videos and co-host on Hey Hey came to an abrupt end when she failed to show for work, later explaining she suffered a nervous breakdown. As she finished both programs without warning, emergency replacements were called in, with Getaway presenter Catriona Rowntree temporarily replacing her on Funniest Home Videos, before Kim Kilby was brought in as a permanent host, whilst Livinia Nixon replaced her as co-host of Hey Hey It's Saturday.

=== 1999–2010 ===
After more than two years off-screen, Taylor made her return television appearance on In Melbourne Tonight in August 1999, singing "I Want You Back". Taylor joined the cast of the Australian stage production, Happy Days: The Arena Mega Musical in October 1999. Taylor played Laura, a character created for the stage show, who was in cahoots with Jon Stevens' Frank (also an original character) to put the famous diner out of business. The music selected for the Happy Days production was almost entirely from the 1960s. Taylor's songs included "Stand By Me", "You Don't Own Me" and "Smell Him".

Taylor returned to Australia's Funniest Home Video Show as a guest in late 1999 for the shows 10th Anniversary special. She performed the program's theme song, "The Funny Things You Do", and Stevie Wonder's version of "Happy Birthday". Taylor also returned as a guest and performer for the final episode of Hey Hey It's Saturday's original run in November 1999.

In 2000, Taylor hosted Starstruck, a Saturday night talent quest show, in what was her final regular television role for more than seven years. Taylor appeared as a guest on Greeks on the Roof in 2003 and on Australia Unites: Reach Out to Asia in 2005, a joint venture by the Seven, Nine, and Ten networks to raise money for the Boxing Day Tsunami. In 2005 Taylor was announced as co-host of Nine's new lifestyle program Scotty's Place (later renamed Our Place), but was replaced before the first episode.

In 2006, Taylor joined Noosa's radio station Zinc 96.1 FM morning crew with Jamie Dunn and Agro for six months. Taylor co-hosted an Australian version of Dirty Jobs on the Nine Network with Ben Dark between October and November 2007 and made an appearance on Mornings With Kerri-Anne in 2009 during a travel infomercial segment. Taylor returned for the second Hey Hey It's Saturday reunion show on 7 October 2009.

Taylor was amongst the line up of celebrities competing in the tenth season of Dancing with the Stars on the Seven Network. She was eliminated in the fourth week. On 13 November 2010 episode of Hey Hey It's Saturday she returned to the show as a contestant during one of the game segments. She returned again on 27 November 2010 to judge Red Faces on the series finale.

=== 2016–present ===
Taylor returned to screens again after a six-year absence as a contestant on season two of I'm A Celebrity...Get Me Out of Here! in January 2016. She entered the South African jungle on Day 1 and chose World Vision Australia as her charity. She later appeared as a co-host on Studio 10 and a contestant on All Star Family Feud on 1 August 2016. From 2021 until 2023 she was a weekly presenter on Destination W.A.

== Personal life ==
After disappearing from television in mid-1997, Taylor moved to San Diego, California, and remained out of the public eye for more than two years. She returned to Australia in August 1999 and revealed in an interview with Ray Martin that her disappearance was due to a nervous breakdown. In 2016, during an episode of I'm A Celebrity...Get Me Out of Here!, Taylor confirmed her abrupt disappearance in 1997 was due to being exhausted and stressed due to work pressures, along with the negative effect a falsely rumoured sex tape was having on herself and her family. Taylor described that time of her life as extremely difficult and explained that her mental instability and weaknesses were not talked about back then, but that she is not ashamed.

Taylor travelled to Ethiopia and Uganda in 1996 as an ambassador for World Vision Australia to meet her sponsor child and film a documentary.

Taylor's first marriage was to guitarist Jamie Jardine from 1992 until 1997. In 1995, they purchased a historic 500-hectare property on the northern NSW coast. Taylor's second marriage was to tennis player Thomas Muster. Taylor and Muster married in Austria in 2000 and had one child, Christian (born 2001). Their wedding photos and story appeared in Woman's Day magazine. Taylor and Muster separated in 2002 and divorced in 2005.

In 2016, Taylor married her third husband, Matt Bennell, in South Africa. The pair had first met in Noosa around 2006 when their sons played on the same indoor soccer team, and maintaining a close friendship for eight years before beginning a romantic relationship.

In 2019, Taylor moved back to Perth after living in Melbourne and Noosa with her son since 2005. She has been practicing Iyengar Yoga since 2010 and is studying as a yoga teacher trainee.

== Filmography ==
=== Television ===
Year	Film	Role	Notes
1984–1986	Perth's Young Entertainers	Performer	
1991	Blind Date	Herself	Celebrity episode
1993	Sale of the Century	Co-host	Guest host for one week
1993	Getaway	Presenter	Guest presenter
1993–1997, 1999	Australia's Funniest Home Video Show	Hostess	Became the youngest female to present on prime time TV in Australia; Returned for the 10th Anniversary episode Nominated—Logie Award for Best New Talent (1994); Nominated—Logie Award for Most Popular Light Entertainment Personality (1996)
1994	Vision for a Better World	Co-host	Telethon co-hosted with Larry Emdur in Africa
1994	Frontline	Herself	1 episode: The Night of Nights
1994, 1999	Carols By Candlelight	Performer	
1995–1997, 1999, 2009–2010	Hey Hey It's Saturday	Co-host	Returned for final show and three episodes during reunions and revival
1995	This Is Your Life	Performer	Performed for Molly Meldrum
1995	Rock Eisteddfod Challenge National Final	Hostess	
1996–1997	What's Up Doc?	Hostess	Filled in for the regular hosts on occasion over this period
1996	40 Years of Television	Hostess	Nine Network Special Presentation
2000	StarStruck	Hostess	Hosted first season only
2003	Greeks on the Roof	Herself	Appeared in one episode, interview and performance
2004	Renovation Rescue	Herself	Guest renovator
2005	Australia Unites: Reach Out To Asia	Herself	Joint venture between Seven Network, Nine Network and Network Ten
2007	Dirty Jobs	Presenter	First regular television role in seven years
2009	Mornings With Kerri-Anne	Presenter	Infomercial presenter for travel segments
2010	20 to 1	Herself	
2010	Dancing with the Stars	Contestant	Eliminated 3rd
2016	I'm a Celebrity...Get Me Out of Here!	Contestant	

=== Stage ===
Year	Film	Role	Notes
1995	Cinderella	Cinderella	3–28 January, Sydney State Theatre
1996	The New Rocky Horror Show	The Usherette/Columbia	10 February – 16 March, Brisbane Lyric Theatre; 22 March – 14 April, Newcastle Civic Theatre
1999	Happy Days – The Arena Mega Musical	Laura	15 October, Sydney Superdome; 25–26 October, Melbourne Park; 1–2 November, Hindmarsh Entertainment Centre; 6 November, Perth Entertainment Centre; 29–30 November, Brisbane Lyric Theatre

== Discography ==
=== Albums ===
Album, with selected details and chart position shown
Title	Album details	Peak chart positions
Title	Album details	AUS
99 Reasons	Released: 5 August 1991; Label: Melodian (D30468); Formats: CD, Cassette	109

=== Singles ===
List of singles, with selected chart positions
Title	Year	Peak chart positions	Album
Title	Year	AUS	Album
"99 Reasons"	1991	31	99 Reasons
"You Don't Own Me"	1991	137	99 Reasons
"A Prayer for Jane"	1993	61	Non-album single
"I Love My Dog"	1996	95	101 Dalmatians Soundtrack

== Awards and nominations ==
=== ARIA Music Awards ===
The ARIA Music Awards is an annual awards ceremony held by the Australian Recording Industry Association. They commenced in 1987.

Year	Nominee / work	Award	Result	Ref.
1992	"99 Reasons"	Best New Talent	Nominated	
