= Operation Madad =

Operation Madad may refer to:

- Operation Madad (Indian Navy), a disaster relief operation undertaken by the Indian Armed Forces in the aftermath of the 2004 Indian Ocean tsunami.
- Operation Madad (Pakistan Navy), Pakistan Navy's assistance and SAR operation to support effected areas of Pakistan following the 2010 Pakistan floods.
