= What's Up Doc? (Australian TV series) =

- Genre: Children's show
- Presented by: Danielle Fairclough; Catriona Rowntree; Steven Jacobs; Kate Fischer; Jo Beth Taylor (temp); Julia Morris (temp); Karen Fischer
- Country of origin: Australia
- Original language: English
- No. of seasons: 7

Production
- Running time: 150–180 minutes

Original release
- Network: Nine Network
- Release: 31 July 1993 – 24 December 1999

Related
- The Cool Room

What's Up Doc? was a children's program which aired on the Nine Network in Australia from 31 July 1993 until 24 December 1999. It centred on the showing of Warner Bros. cartoons and hosted segments with additional original elements. It followed on from The Bugs Bunny Show, a similar program hosted by Sophie Lee, which aired from 1990 until 1992.

== History ==
The program originally aired on Saturday mornings from 9:00am until 11:00am, before moving to weekdays at 4:30pm for half an hour beginning on 12 February 1996. The show was filmed in studio on the same styled set for the whole run of the show, starting at Nine's Richmond, Victoria studios, before moving to studios in Willoughby, New South Wales. The hosts also regularly visited Warner Bros. Movie World on the Gold Coast, Queensland where a week's worth of episodes were filmed at a time.

The final episode aired on Friday 24 December 1999. The show was originally announced to return in early 2000; however, a new Warner Bros. cartoon themed program titled The Cool Room debuted in its place.

== Hosts ==
=== Permanent ===
- Danielle Fairclough (July 1993—July 1994)
- Catriona Rowntree (August 1994—December 1995)
- Steven Jacobs (February 1996—August 1996)
- Kate Fischer (August 1996—October 1997)
- Karen Fischer (November 1997—December 1999)

=== Temporary ===
- Jo Beth Taylor (1996, 1997)
- Julia Morris (1997)

== Programming ==
When the show aired on weekday afternoons, the cartoon series that were shown were Pinky and the Brain or Freakazoid! on Mondays, Looney Tunes and Merrie Melodies on Tuesdays and Thursdays, Animaniacs or The Sylvester and Tweety Mysteries or Waynehead on Wednesdays and Batman: The Animated Series or The New Batman Adventures or Batman Beyond or Pinky, Elmyra and the Brain on Fridays.

When the show aired on Saturday mornings there were additional series shown including The Porky Pig Show, The Road Runner Show, Tiny Toon Adventures, Taz-Mania, Superman: The Animated Series, Free Willy and Beetlejuice.
