= Tsunami Evaluation Coalition =

The Tsunami Evaluation Coalition (TEC) was a unique learning and accountability initiative in the relief and development sector. It was first established in February 2005 to carry out joint evaluations of the response to the 2004 Indian Ocean earthquake and tsunami.

The TEC had over 50 member agencies from the United Nations, Non-Governmental Organizations, and the Red Cross, as well as private donors. These organizations have been working together since the TEC was established to:

- Improve policy and practice in the relief and rehabilitation sector.
- Provide some accountability to both the donor and recipient public.
- Improve evaluation in the relief and rehabilitation sector by learning from the TEC process itself.

== Need for evaluation ==
The TEC was the most significant evaluation effort in the humanitarian sector since the Joint Evaluation of the response to the Rwanda Crisis in 1994, and followed in the footsteps of Study 3 of that evaluation which examined humanitarian aid and its effects.

== Governance ==
The TEC was guided by a Core Management Group of about 15 members. The TEC was hosted by the Active Learning Network for Accountability and Performance in Humanitarian Action (ALNAP) Secretariat in London.

== The TEC products ==
The TEC produced a series of reports:

- An initial findings report in December 2005.
- The main synthesis report, the five thematic reports, and the underlying country studies and other subsidiary reports in July 2006.
- An expanded summary of the synthesis report in January 2007.

All the TEC reports can be found on the TEC website.

== The six initial findings ==
The TEC published an initial findings report in December 2005. These preliminary findings were based on initial reports from the more than fifty consultants involved in the field-work.

== The main synthesis report ==
This report synthesized the whole TEC evaluation effort. The foreword of the report was written by former US President Bill Clinton in his capacity as the United Nations Secretary-General's Special Envoy for Tsunami Recovery.

The four main findings dealt with:

- Local capacities.
- International support for local actors.
- The quality of interventions.
- The unpredictable funding system.

== See also ==
- Humanitarian response to the 2004 Indian Ocean earthquake
- 2004 Indian Ocean earthquake
- Program evaluation
