= Australia Unites: Reach Out to Asia =

Australian 2005 telethon

- Country of origin: Australia
- Original language: English
- No. of episodes: 1

Production
- Running time: approx 6 hours

Original release
- Network: Seven Network; Nine Network; Network Ten
- Release: 8 January 2005

Australia Unites: Reach Out to Asia was a telethon held in Australia on 8 January 2005. The telethon raised money for World Vision, as a part of the humanitarian response to the 2004 Indian Ocean earthquake. It was telecast on the three commercial television networks (the Seven Network, the Nine Network and Network Ten, by ABC Asia Pacific and through regional stations as well). It was the first time all three television networks produced a telethon as a unit. It was also simulcast on the Triple M network, Mix 94.5 Perth, ARN (Mix and Classic Hits), and Nova stations.

== Locations ==
It was held in two locations:

- The telethon was held at the Telstra Dome in Melbourne, where the main call centre was also located. This portion was presented by Seven's Andrew O'Keefe, Nine's Eddie McGuire, Ten's Rove McManus, with Nine's Catriona Rowntree and Ten's Peter Helliar reporting from the call centre and celebrity green room.
- A concert with some of Australia's leading performers held on the forecourt of the Sydney Opera House. This portion was presented by Seven's Melissa Doyle and David Koch and Nine's Larry Emdur, with Nine's Richard Wilkins and Ten's Gretel Killeen reporting from backstage and the audience. Performers included Killing Heidi, Guy Sebastian, Missy Higgins, The Dissociatives, Kasey Chambers, Alex Lloyd, a reformed Noiseworks with lead singer Jon Stevens, and a supergroup featuring members of You Am I, The Living End, Jet and Spiderbait.

== Description ==
The program also included crosses to Seven's Chris Reason and Molly Meldrum and Nine's Ray Martin and Christine Spiteri from the areas affected by the tsunami.

At end of broadcast, A$15,198,329.20 had been raised. However, the switchboards continued after the programme, and over A$20 million had been raised, boosting private Australian aid to over A$140 million.
