= Operation Sea Waves =

Indian military operation

Operation Sea Waves was a disaster relief operation undertaken by the Indian Armed Forces in the aftermath of the 2004 Indian Ocean tsunami. Sea Waves was focused on rescue and relief efforts on the Andaman and Nicobar Islands.

== Background ==
On 26 December 2004 starting at 00:58:53 UTC, a massive earthquake measuring between 9.1 and 9.3 on the moment magnitude scale occurred off the West coast of Sumatra. The earthquake resulted in a devastating series of tsunamis along most landmasses bordering the Indian Ocean. With waves up to 30 meters high, the tsunami killed over 230,000 people and inundated most coastal communities in the affected areas.

The tsunami made landfall on the east coast of India about 90 minutes after the earthquake hit. An estimated 18,045 people were killed in India, with at least 12,405 confirmed dead, mainly in the southeastern states of Tamil Nadu and on the Andaman & Nicobar Islands. At least 5,000 people were reported missing and over 600,000 were displaced when their homes were destroyed by the tsunami in India.

== Response ==
The Operation Sea Waves disaster relief operation was undertaken by the Indian Armed Forces in the aftermath of the 2004 Indian Ocean tsunami. Sea Waves was focused on rescue and relief efforts on the Andaman and Nicobar Islands.

On the Andaman & Nicobar Islands, the most severe damage occurred on the southern Nicobar islands. The Indian Air Force (IAF) base on Car Nicobar was one of the worst hit. The staff quarters for the air base, which were right on the waterfront, took the brunt of the tsunami head on. Among the casualties were a number of IAF personnel and their families and children.

The immediate challenge for the IAF staff was to mount a relief and rescue operation using available aircraft, as well as to rehabilitate the runway and the supporting flight infrastructure to enable relief flights to land, while dealing with the loss of their families, friends and colleagues.

All available Indian Naval and Coast Guard assets at the Port Blair naval base were deployed for search and rescue. With the local hospitals overwhelmed, many of the critically injured were evacuated by naval vessels to hospitals on the mainland. Naval amphibious warfare vessels and landing craft were deployed to deliver aid to survivors on remote islands who had been rendered homeless by the tsunami.

== See also ==
- Operation Madad, similar effort launched to focus on disaster relief on the Indian mainland states of Tamil Nadu and Andhra Pradesh.
