= StarStruck (2000 TV series) =

StarStruck logo

StarStruck was an Australian talent show that was broadcast on the Nine Network between the years 2000 and 2002. The show was originally hosted by Jo Beth Taylor, who was replaced by Jay Laga'aia after the first series.

The show resembled other talent shows such as New Faces in that it featured a number of musical acts who were rated by a panel of judges.
