= Focus Humanitarian Assistance =

Focus Humanitarian Assistance is an international group of agencies established in Europe, North America and South Asia to complement the provision of emergency relief, principally in the developing world. It helps people in need reduce their dependence on humanitarian aid and facilitates their transition to sustainable self-reliant, long-term development.

Focus Humanitarian Assistance is affiliated with the Aga Khan Development Network, a group of institutions working to improve opportunities and living conditions, for people of all faiths and origins, in specific regions of the developing world. Underlying the establishment of FOCUS by the Ismaili Muslim community is a history of successful initiatives to assist people struck by natural and man-made disasters in South and Central Asia, and Africa.

== Disaster relief ==
Where FOCUS can harness organisational and volunteer capacity, it provides relief and support services to communities affected by natural and man-made disasters. Engaging its volunteer network to assist in distribution operations, FOCUS provides relief items which, in the past, have ranged from emergency food, temporary shelter, clothing and blankets as well as other basic household items. FOCUS seeks to enable relief by assessing and responding to the immediate needs of those affected by disaster; creating disaster resilience by identifying natural hazards and training professionals and volunteers to address them; and helping displaced persons maintain their dignity as they resettle and gradually become self-reliant. FOCUS India, in collaboration with RAPID UK, an international search and rescue organisation, has trained national level Search & Rescue Team, to carry out surface rescue operations. It also has a national level Disaster Assessment & Response Team to carry out post-disaster needs assessment and to identify short and long term relief and rehabilitation needs of disaster victims.

== Disaster resilience ==
FOCUS's Community-Based Disaster Risk Reduction programmes aim to enhance a community's capacity to live safely within the local environment. FOCUS's risk reduction approach incorporates participatory Hazard Vulnerability Capacity Risk Assessment and disaster planning. This scientific method of quantitative risk analysis has inspired various communities to address their risk in a planned way. Basic disaster risk management skills are demonstrated to community and village centres, schools, hostels and hospitals.

== FOCUS Challenge events – Hike4Life / Bike4Life ==
FOCUS organise an annual challenge event called Hike4Life / Bike4Life. The list of previous events is as follows:

- 2002 Bike4Life – Egypt
- 2003 Hike4Life – Kenya
- 2005 Hike4Life – India
- 2006 Hike4Life – Madagascar
- 2007 Hike4Life – Tanzania
- 2008 Bike4Life – India
- 2009 Hike4Life – Uganda
- 2010 Bike4Life – Morocco
- 2011 Hike4Life – Tanzania
- 2013 – Walk for Life Mumbai
- 2014– Walk for Life Ahmedabad

== Key interventions ==
- 2006 Israel–Lebanon conflict
- 2005 Kashmir earthquake
- 2010 Pakistan floods
- 2004 Indian Ocean earthquake and tsunami
- War in Afghanistan (2001–present)
