= Iceland Pure Spring Water =

Icelandic bottled water brand

Iceland Spring
- A bottle of Iceland Spring water
- Country: Iceland
- Source: Heiðmörk, Reykjavík
- Type: still
- pH: 7.64 tested 8.88 claimed
- Website: www.icelandspring.com
- All concentrations in milligrams per liter (mg/L); pH without units

Iceland Spring water is an Icelandic brand of bottled water, bottled by Iceland Spring ehf. of Reykjavík, Iceland. The water is sourced from Heiðmörk, the same source as tap water for the city of Reykjavík. It is more expensive in Iceland, where it is bottled, than as an imported product elsewhere. Iceland Spring claim the water is chemically basic with a pH of 8.88. (ref: NSF reports 2021 and 2022 pH shows 8.9 and 9.05 respectively)
