= Catriona Rowntree =

Australian television presenter (born 1971)

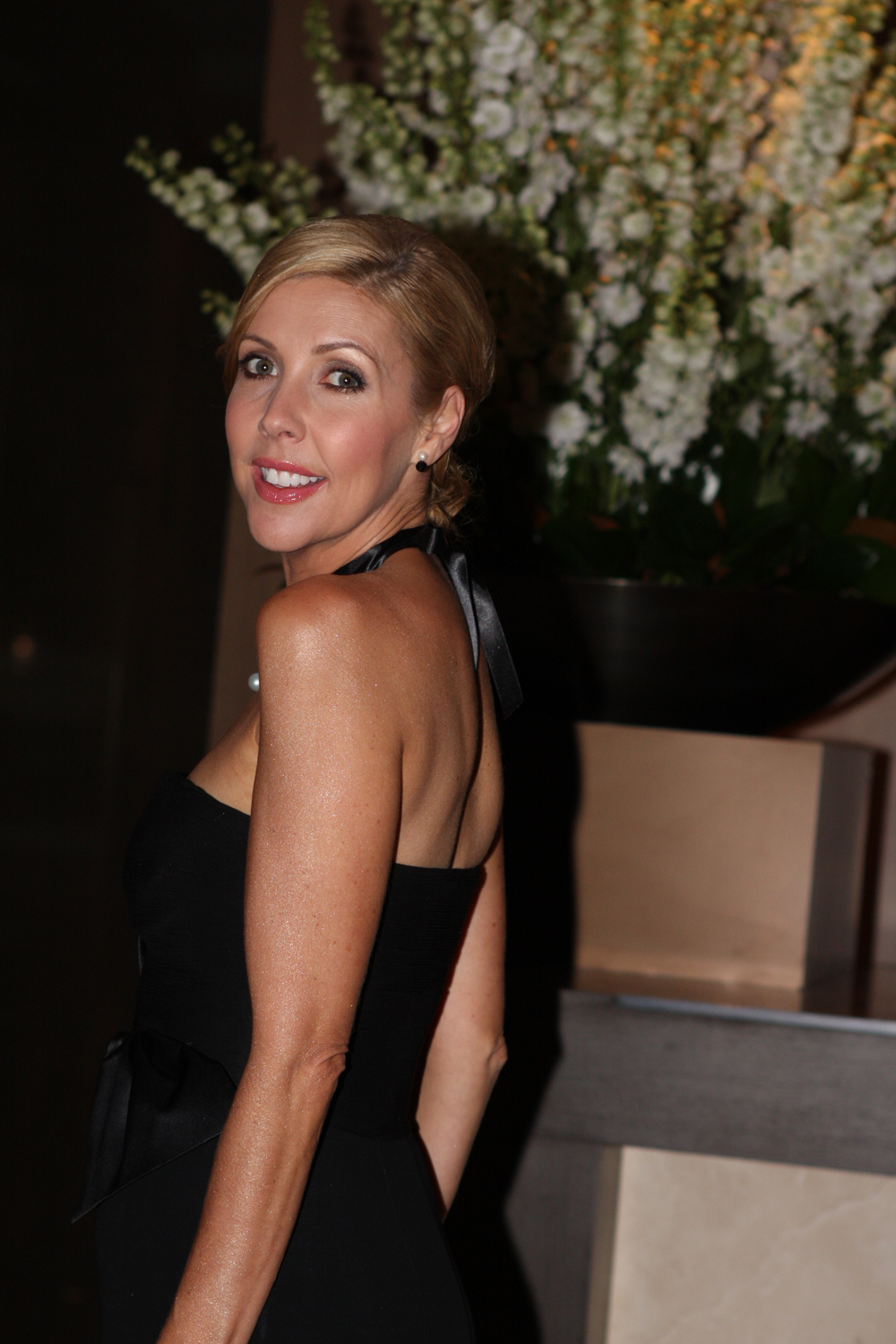
- Rowntree in 2012
- Born: 19 July 1971 (age 55); Sydney, New South Wales, Australia
- Occupations: Television and radio presenter
- Years active: 1991–present
- Employer: Nine Network
- Website: Getaway Profile

Catriona Rowntree (born 19 July 1971) is an Australian television and radio presenter.

Rowntree is a long-standing presenter on the Nine Network's travel and lifestyle program Getaway.

== Career ==
Rowntree studied journalism at Macleay College in Sydney, after working as a researcher with Business Review Weekly, 2GB and Prime Television. In 1991, she moved to FM radio as a newsreader and music and lifestyle program host, first in community radio and then with the ABC youth station Triple J, for which she presented until 1996.

In 1992, Rowntree was hired as a researcher for the Nine Network children's series Wonder World!, graduating to the position of reporter the following year, and host in 1994. In that same year, whilst still working at Triple J, she also became the host of a Nine Network children's show called What's Up Doc?. Rowntree went on to become the show's writer/producer.

In 1996, Rowntree became a reporter on Getaway, a popular Nine Network travel series. While retaining this position, she has also made appearances on other Nine programs. She also appeared on Nine's Sydney New Year's Eve telecast alongside Richard Wilkins. In 2006 she wrote a travel book, Catriona's Australia: My Favourite Aussie Locations, published by HarperCollins. In 2009 and 2010, Catriona Rowntree was appointed MC at the Pas de Deux in Paradise production by The Australian Ballet at Qualia on Hamilton Island.

== Personal life ==
In 2007, Rowntree became engaged to farmer James Pettit, and the couple married on Saturday 5 April 2008 in the chapel of the latter's old school, Geelong Grammar School.

Catriona gave birth to her first child, a son, on 5 August 2009; and to her second son on 11 March 2011.

== Bibliography ==
=== Contributor ===
- Rowntree, Catriona (2007). "Contributor". Laugh Even Louder!. By Camp Quality. Gosford, New South Wales: Scholastic Australia Pty Limited. ISBN 978-1-74169-022-4.
