= Operation Madad (Indian Navy) =

Name of rescue operations conducted by the Indian navy

Operation Madad is the name of rescue operations conducted by Indian Navy in various occasions within India. The word "madad" in Hindi means "help".

== 2004 Indian Ocean tsunami ==
On 26 December 2004 starting at 00:58:53 UTC, a massive earthquake measuring between 9.1 and 9.3 on the moment magnitude scale occurred off the West coast of Sumatra. The earthquake resulted in a devastating series of tsunamis along most landmasses bordering the Indian Ocean. With waves up to 30 meters high, the tsunami killed over 230,000 people and inundated most coastal communities in the affected areas.

The tsunami made landfall on the east coast of India about 90 minutes later. An estimated 18,045 people were killed in India, with at least 12,405 confirmed dead and over 5,000 reported missing, mainly in the southeastern state of Tamil Nadu and on the Andaman & Nicobar Islands. Over 600,000 people had their homes destroyed and were displaced by the tsunami.

With almost immediate realization of the scale of the tsunami, the immediate action was to deploy the Indian Air Force, Navy and Coast Guard aircraft and helicopters to estimate the damages. The aircraft were airborne less than an hour after the tsunami struck the east coast.

Indian Navy and Coast Guard search and rescue units played a critical role in rescuing survivors, as well as in the recovery of dead bodies in the later stages.

Naval and Coast Guard divers played a critical role in clearing the approach channels to Indian ports, to enable civilian boats and ships to join the rescue efforts.

Naval amphibious warfare vessels and landing craft were deployed to rescue survivors and deliver aid to affected coastal communities that were cut off due to damage to infrastructure during the tsunami.

== 2018 Kerala floods ==
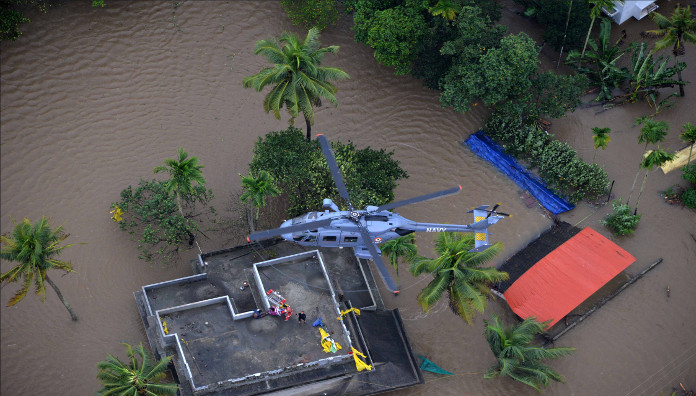
Southern Naval Command initiates Operation Madad in Kerala

In August 2018, severe flooding affected the south Indian state of Kerala due to unusually high rainfall during the monsoon season. It was the worst flooding in Kerala in nearly a century. Over 445 people died, 15 are missing within a fortnight, while at least a million people were evacuated, mainly from Chengannur, Pandanad, Aranmula, Aluva, Chalakudy, Kuttanad and Pandalam. All 14 districts of the state were placed on red alert. According to the Kerala government, one-sixth of the total population of Kerala had been directly affected by the floods and related incidents. The Indian government had declared it a Level 3 Calamity or 'Calamity of a severe nature'. It is the worst flood in Kerala after Great flood of 99 that happened in 1924.

The Government of Kerala sought Indian Navy’s assistance for carrying out "Search and Rescue" operations in low lying flooded areas of Ernakulam and Idukki districts due to opening of Cheruthoni dam shutters and Wayanad district following heavy rains. The Southern Naval Command dispatched four diving teams with dinghies to Mananthavady and Kalpatta in Wayanad district on 9 August 2018 to render assistance to the local populace. In addition, one Sea King helicopter was also dispatched to Wayanad for evacuating any stranded people. The team is carrying three inflatable boats, rescue equipment and medical supply to provide first aid and is in constant touch with the District Collector.

The Southern Naval Command continued with heightened deployment of teams under Special Appointment, Sanath Divakar (NIA) as QRT until army took official charge of Operation Madad for the tenth day – 19 August 2018. SNC rescue teams have been augmented by Gemini boats, divers and other resources from both Eastern and Western Naval Commands of the Indian Navy. 92 diving teams have been deployed at various locations across the affected districts. Rescue operations were extended to two more districts of Kannur and Alappuzha, in addition to the three districts already being covered of Thrissur, Ernakulam and Pathanamthitta.

The Southern Naval Command terminated Operation Madad on 24 August 2018 on successful completion of rescue and relief operations. This was the largest ever HADR operation undertaken by the SNC that lasted close to sixteen days, with a total of 16,843 persons having been rescued, of which 15670 were by boat, while 1173 had to be airlifted. The efforts reached a peak with 92 rescue teams with Gemini boats deployed in a day. The aircraft were also able to undertake air sorties from daybreak to dusk without stopping.
